= Purefoods–Swift rivalry =

Defunct PBA rivalry

Purefoods–RFM rivalry
- Teams: Purefoods; RFM franchise

Postseason history
- 1991 All-Filipino Finals: Purefoods won, 3–2; 1991 All-Filipino Finals: Purefoods won, 3–2; 1993 Commissioner's Cup Finals: Swift won, 4–2

The Purefoods Corporation had a basketball rivalry with the Republic Flour Mills (RFM) company in the Philippine Basketball Association (PBA) for most of the 1990s, where they competed not only in sports but also in products.

== Pre-PBA days ==
Purefoods Corporation burst into the basketball scene in 1986 by joining the Philippine Amateur Basketball League (PABL) which had the RFM-Swifts as its founding members. Both companies, which were into food and beverage business, were the largest producer and marketer of processed meats in the Philippines. Their first-ever match-up took place during the second conference (Founder's Cup) at the Rizal Memorial Coliseum.

Overall, RFM Corporation was more successful in the amateur league, its team won three championships from 1987 to 1989 and featured some of the best amateur cagers and national team members such as Elmer Cabahug, Ato Agustin, Ric-Ric Marata, Alvin Patrimonio and Zaldy Realubit. Purefoods were mostly consists of players who didn't really make their mark into the pro league and some collegiate standouts.

In 1988, Purefoods entered the Philippine Basketball Association, buying out the franchise rights of the disbanded Tanduay Rhum Makers. Their amateur ballclub would play its final season after two conferences. The Purefoods' PBA team was securing the services of national team player Alvin Patrimonio, who had express his desire to move to the pro ranks but was denied release and prevented by his mother team in the PABL: RFM-Swifts, Eventually, Patrimonio was released and began playing for Purefoods Hotdogs in the PBA starting on June 30.

== PBA rivalry ==
=== First two seasons (1990-1991) ===
Republic Flour Mills (RFM) bought the Cosmos Bottling Corporation in 1989 and were first known as Pop Cola Sizzlers when they joined the Philippine Basketball Association (PBA) as an expansion franchise in 1990. Their first meeting with corporate rival Purefoods Hotdogs takes place on March 1, 1990, with Purefoods winning 132–122. Pop Cola got back at Purefoods in their second meeting on March 13 and scored their first win in the pro league after five losses, defeating the Hotdogs, 138–120.

In the 1990 PBA Third Conference semifinals, Pop Cola now rename Sarsi, were already out of contention even in the series for third place when they played with pride and beat the finals-seeking Purefoods, 138–131, denying the Hotdogs an outright finals berth and sent them into a playoff game against Shell.

The following season in 1991, Diet Sarsi acquired shooting guard Al Solis from Purefoods by offering him a contract which the Hotdogs did not match. On April 14, Purefoods center Jack Tanuan joined the Sizzlers. RFM also tried to acquire Hotdogs' forward Alvin Patrimonio but the PBA office fined both RFM and Patrimonio for tampering. The two corporate rivals battled in the 1991 PBA All-Filipino Conference finals. The best-of-five series went in all five games with the Hotdogs winning, 107-100, in the deciding game. Starting the third conference of that year, RFM changed its team name from Diet Sarsi to Swift Mighty Meaty Hotdogs (or "Swift Mighty Meaties"), a brand that their amateur ballclub used during the 1980s and as to rival Purefoods' "Tender Juicy Hotdogs".

=== Swift vs Purefoods (1992-1994) ===
While there have been some close matches between Diet Sarsi and Purefoods in the eliminations and semifinals besides their All-Filipino championship meeting in RFM's second season in the PBA, the year 1992 really started to heat up for the two rival ballclubs. It began in the pre-season when Purefoods TJ Hotdogs forward Nelson Asaytono jumped over the other side of the fence and joined Swift Mighty Meaties. The trade in exchange for a future draft pick sealed a long-awaited Alvin Patrimonio vs Nelson Asaytono match-up. In the 1992 PBA First Conference elimination round, Purefoods won over Swift in double-overtime, 131–128, in an early clash on February 13, 1992. The Mighty Meaties nip the Hotdogs, 115–114, in their second meeting on March 19. Swift repeated over Purefoods in their playoff game on March 26 for the last semifinals berth, 123–117.

Purefoods won all three matches against Swift in the 1992 PBA All-Filipino Conference as the Patrimonio-Codiñera tandem proved its superiority over their last year's finals protagonist, the Tender Juicy Hotdogs overcame Nelson Asaytono's career-high of 48 points in a 110–106 win on July 2. Purefoods got the better over Swift in the endgame of their two semifinal matches, winning 108–104 on July 21, and 103–99 on August 11. In the third conference with Swift having the high-scoring Tony Harris as their import, they beat the Hotdogs in all their four meetings.

In the 1993 PBA season, Purefoods finally found a full-time coach in Chot Reyes, unlike the previous year where the team fired coach Ely Capacio after the first conference and team manager Domingo Panganiban acting as their interim coach in the last two conferences. Reyes' coaching stint with Purefoods (renamed Coney Island in the first conference of the 1993 season) started a coaching rivalry between him and Swift's Yeng Guiao. Coach Chot Reyes led Coney Island to the All-Filipino Cup title and the Ice Cream Stars earlier met Swift Mighty Meaties in the best-of-five semifinal series and scored a 3–0 sweep.

Swift and Purefoods played against each other in the championship series for the second time in three years during the second conference called the Commissioners Cup, the Mighty Meaties exact revenge this time over their corporate rivals, having acquired new recruits before the start of the conference via trade, these are shooting forward Vergel Meneses and center Zaldy Realubit. Powered by best import Ronnie Thompkins, Swift won in six games. Coach Yeng Guiao had an overall 13 to 5 edge over Coach Chot Reyes as Swift was "Contra-pelo" to Purefoods in the 1993 season, most of the Hotdogs' heartbreaking losses to Swift were in the import-flavored conference, one of which was in their last semifinal meeting in the Commissioner's Cup on August 20 where Purefoods import Ronnie Grandison missed two free throws that could have won or forced overtime in a one-point loss to the Mighty Meaties and three times in the third conference Governors Cup, the last of which was a 114-112 heartbreaker on November 26 as Swift import Tony Harris scored on a fadeaway shot with 2.2 seconds left in the ballgame.

The 1994 PBA season saw Purefoods did slightly better and as far as coaching match-up, Coach Chot Reyes won five times to Yeng Guiao's three victories. The two notable games between the two teams that season happened in the All-Filipino Cup, Swift players showed up with bald heads in a 92–84 victory over Coney Island in their last outing in the semifinals on May 8, thus earning a post-semifinals playoff game. Coney Island Stars beat the Mighty Meaties, 86–74, in their knockout game five days later to advance into their seventh All-Filipino finals appearance.

After Swift failed to defend the Commissioner's Cup title, coach Yeng Guiao has decided to left the RFM franchise and joined Pepsi Mega in the 1994 PBA Governors Cup in an exchange of coaches as Pepsi coach Derrick Pumaren has taken over the Swift bench and led the team to a runner-up finish in behind champion Alaska Milkmen.

=== Sunkist vs Purefoods (1995-1996) ===
In the 21st PBA season, the most memorable battles between Swift, now known as Sunkist Orange Juicers, and Purefoods happened in the Commissioner's Cup. Swift has acquired former Purefoods import Ronnie Grandison as their reinforcement while Purefoods settled anew on last year's Commissioner's Cup best import and who led the Hotdogs to a title; Kenny Redfield. Purefoods scored two victories, one in the last day of eliminations on July 18 as they dealt the Orange Juicers their first loss, 91–81, after going unbeaten at 9–0. The Hotdogs repeated in their lone quarterfinal match and the two rivals were paired in the best-of-five semifinal series. Sunkist prevailed in five games, winning the decisive fifth game, 105–99 on August 20.

The next season in the 1996 Commissioner's Cup, Purefoods signed former Swift import Ronnie Thompkins. The Hotdogs and the Orange Bottlers battled it out in a playoff for the last semifinals seat, Purefoods won 89–76. The two teams played only once in the Governors Cup and Purefoods, with a new monicker Corned Beef Cowboys, finally beat the "hurricane" Tony Harris as the prolific import was 7–0 over the Purefoods team during his previous stints in 1992 and 1993. The Cowboys escape with a 97–94 win over Sunkist on October 6.

=== Last five seasons (1997-2001) ===
Their rivalry slowed down by the late 1990s as two RFM cagers who have also don the Purefoods jersey before; Al Solis and Nelson Asaytono, have already been gone to the team and moved to different squads. The only significance that took place was their former coaches accepting an offer to coach the team they used to have many hardcourt battles. Derrick Pumaren, who led Sunkist to two championships and a near-grandslam, became Purefoods head coach from 1999 to 2000, leading the ballclub to two runner-up finishes. Chot Reyes, who won two titles with Purefoods, was Pop Cola's coach in their final two seasons in 2000–2001.

== Head-to-head meetings ==
Season	Purefoods	Won	RFM/Cosmos	Won
1990	Purefoods Hotdogs	5	Pop Cola/Sarsi	3
1991	Purefoods TJ Hotdogs	6	Diet Sarsi/Swift Mighty Meaty	9
1992	Purefoods TJ Hotdogs	4 (Note: The number of Purefoods TJ Hotdogs wins listed for the 1992 PBA season does not count a pre-season win.)	Swift Mighty Meaties	6
1993	Coney Island/Purefoods Oodles/Purefoods TJ Hotdogs	5	Swift Mighty Meaties	13
1994	Coney Island/Purefoods TJ Hotdogs	5	Swift Mighty Meaties	5
1995	Purefoods TJ Hotdogs	7	Sunkist Orange Juicers	9
1996	Purefoods TJ Hotdogs/Purefoods Corned Beef Cowboys	4	Sunkist Orange Bottlers	2
1997	Purefoods Corned Beef Cowboys/Purefoods Carne Norte Beefies	2	Pop Cola Bottlers	3
1998	Purefoods Carne Norte Beefies/Purefoods TJ Hotdogs	3	Pop Cola 800s	4
1999	Purefoods TJ Hotdogs	2	Pop Cola 800s	2
Total		43		56

== Notable personnel who served for the both teams ==
=== Players ===
- Nelson Asaytono
- Dindo Pumaren

=== Coaches ===
- Derrick Pumaren
- Chot Reyes
