= 1992 PBA First Conference =

- Duration: February 9 – May 5, 1992
- TV partner(s): Vintage Sports (PTV)

Finals
- Champions: Shell Rimula X Zoomers
- Runners-up: San Miguel Beermen

Awards
- Best Import: Bobby Parks (Shell Rimula X Zoomers)

PBA First Conference chronology
- < 1991

PBA conference chronology
- < 1991 Third 1992 All-Filipino >

The 1992 Philippine Basketball Association (PBA) First Conference was the first Conference of the 1992 PBA season. It started on February 9 and ended on May 5, 1992. The tournament requires a 6'5" and below import for each team.

== Format ==
The following format will be observed for the duration of the conference:

- The teams were divided into 2 groups.

Group A:

1. Ginebra San Miguel
2. Presto Ice Cream
3. Purefoods TJ Hotdogs
4. San Miguel Beermen

Group B:

1. Alaska Milkmen
2. Pepsi Hotshots
3. Shell Rimula X Zoomers
4. Swift Mighty Meaty Hotdogs

- Teams in a group will play against each other once and against teams in the other group twice; 11 games per team; Teams are then seeded by basis on win–loss records. Ties are broken among point differentials of the tied teams. Standings will be determined in one league table; teams do not qualify by basis of groupings.
- The top five teams after the eliminations will advance to the semifinals.
- Semifinals will be two round robin affairs with the remaining teams. Results from the elimination round will be carried over. A playoff incentive for a finals berth will be given to the team that will win at least five of their eight semifinal games.
- The top two teams (or the top team and the winner of the playoff incentive) will face each other in a best-of-seven championship series. The next two teams will qualify for a best-of-five playoff for third place.

== Elimination round ==
=== Team standings ===
| Pos | Team | W | L | PCT | GB | Qualification |
|---|---|---|---|---|---|---|
| 1 | Presto Ice Cream | 7 | 4 | .636 | — | Semifinal round |
| 2 | Shell Rimula X Zoomers | 7 | 4 | .636 | — | Semifinal round |
| 3 | San Miguel Beermen | 7 | 4 | .636 | — | Semifinal round |
| 4 | Alaska Milkmen | 6 | 5 | .545 | 1 | Semifinal round |
| 5 | Swift Mighty Meaty Hotdogs | 5 | 6 | .455 (Note: Semifinal berth playoff: Swift 123–117 Purefoods) | 2 | Semifinal round |
| 6 | Purefoods Tender Juicy Hotdogs | 5 | 6 | .455 | 2 | |
| 7 | Pepsi Hotshots | 4 | 7 | .364 | 3 | |
| 8 | Ginebra San Miguel | 3 | 8 | .273 | 4 | |

=== Semifinal berth playoff ===
Vintage

March 26

Swift Mighty Meaties 123, Purefoods TJ Hotdogs 117

The NASA, Pasig

== Semifinal round ==
=== Team standings ===
Overall standings
| Pos | Team | W | L | PCT | GB | Qualification |
|---|---|---|---|---|---|---|
| 1 | Shell Rimula X Zoomers | 13 | 6 | .684 | — | Advance to the finals (Note: If a team outside the top two teams wins at least five semifinal round games, then it and the second-placed team will playoff for the last finals berth; otherwise, the top 2 teams qualify outright.) |
| 2 | San Miguel Beermen | 11 | 8 | .579 (Note: Head-to-head record: San Miguel 2–2 Alaska, San Miguel +11) | 2 | Guaranteed finals berth playoff |
| 3 | Alaska Milkmen | 11 | 8 | .579 | 2 | Qualify to finals berth playoff |
| 4 | Swift Mighty Meaty Hotdogs | 9 | 10 | .474 | 4 | Proceed to third place playoffs |
| 5 | Presto Ice Cream | 8 | 11 | .421 | 5 | |

Notes:

Semifinal round standings
| Pos | Team | W | L | Qualification |
|---|---|---|---|---|
| 1 | Shell Rimula X Zoomers | 6 | 2 | |
| 2 | Alaska Milkmen | 5 | 3 | Qualify to finals berth playoff (Note: Shell advanced to the finals outright as #1 seeded team; finals berth playoff: San Miguel 118–97 Alaska) |
| 3 | San Miguel Beermen | 4 | 4 | |
| 4 | Swift Mighty Meaty Hotdogs | 4 | 4 | |
| 5 | Presto Ice Cream | 1 | 7 | |

== Finals berth playoff ==
Vintage

April 23

San Miguel Beermen 118, Alaska Milkmen 97

The NASA, Pasig

== Third place playoffs ==
Vintage

April 26

Alaska Milkmen 111, Swift Mighty Meaty Hotdogs 108

The NASA, Pasig

Vintage

April 28

Alaska Milkmen 127, Swift Mighty Meaty Hotdogs 132

The NASA, Pasig

Vintage

April 30

Alaska Milkmen 121, Swift Mighty Meaty Hotdogs 130

The NASA, Pasig

Vintage

May 3

Alaska Milkmen W, Swift Mighty Meaty Hotdogs L

The NASA, Pasig

Vintage

May 5

Alaska Milkmen 115, Swift Mighty Meaty Hotdogs 107
Alaska wins series, 3–2

The NASA, Pasig

== Finals ==
Vintage

April 26

Shell Rimula X Zoomers 112, San Miguel Beermen 105 (OT)

The NASA, Pasig

Vintage

April 28

Shell Rimula X Zoomers 98, San Miguel Beermen 89

The NASA, Pasig

Vintage

April 30

Shell Rimula X Zoomers 93, San Miguel Beermen 115

The NASA, Pasig

Vintage

May 3

Shell Rimula X Zoomers 104, San Miguel Beermen 98

The NASA, Pasig

Vintage

May 5

Shell Rimula X Zoomers 102, San Miguel Beermen 92
Shell wins series, 4–1

The NASA, Pasig
