= 1992 PBA All-Filipino Conference =

- Duration: June 7 – August 30, 1992
- TV partner(s): Vintage Sports (PTV)

Finals
- Champions: San Miguel Beermen
- Runners-up: Purefoods TJ Hotdogs

PBA All-Filipino Conference chronology
- < 1991 1993 >

PBA conference chronology
- < 1992 First 1992 Third >

The 1992 Philippine Basketball Association (PBA) All-Filipino Conference was the second conference of the 1992 PBA season. It started on June 7 and ended on August 30, 1992. The tournament is an All-Filipino format, which doesn't require an import or a pure-foreign player for each team.

== Format ==
The following format will be observed for the duration of the conference:

- The teams were divided into 2 groups.

Group A:

1. Ginebra San Miguel
2. Presto Ice Cream
3. Purefoods TJ Hotdogs
4. San Miguel Beermen

Group B:

1. Alaska Milkmen
2. 7-Up Uncolas
3. Shell Rimula X Zoomers
4. Swift Mighty Meaty Hotdogs

- Teams in a group will play against each other twice and against teams in the other group once; 10 games per team; Teams are then seeded by basis on win–loss records. Ties are broken among point differentials of the tied teams. Standings will be determined in one league table; teams do not qualify by basis of groupings.
- The top five teams after the eliminations will advance to the semifinals.
- Semifinals will be two round robin affairs with the remaining teams. Results from the elimination round will be carried over. A playoff incentive for a finals berth will be given to the team that will win at least five of their eight semifinal games.
- The top two teams (or the top team and the winner of the playoff incentive) will face each other in a best-of-seven championship series. The next two teams will qualify for a best-of-five playoff for third place.

== Elimination round ==
=== Team standings ===
Pos	Team	W	L	PCT	GB	Qualification
1	Purefoods Tender Juicy Hotdogs	8	2	.800	—	Semifinal round
2	Swift Mighty Meaty Hotdogs	7	3	.700	1	Semifinal round
3	San Miguel Beermen	7	3	.700	1	Semifinal round
4	7-Up Uncolas	6	4	.600	2	Semifinal round
5	Shell Rimula X Zoomers	5	5	.500	3	Semifinal round
6	Ginebra San Miguel	3	7	.300	5	
7	Alaska Milkmen	2	8	.200	6	
8	Presto Ice Cream	2	8	.200	6	

== Semifinal round ==
=== Team standings ===
Overall standings
Pos	Team	W	L	PCT	GB	Qualification
1	San Miguel Beermen	14	4	.778	—	Advance to the finals (Note: If a team outside the top two teams wins at least five semifinal round games, then it and the second-placed team will playoff for the last finals berth; otherwise, the top 2 teams qualify outright.)
2	Purefoods Tender Juicy Hotdogs	12	6	.667	2	Guaranteed finals berth playoff
3	7-Up Uncolas	12	6	.667	2	Qualify to finals berth playoff
4	Swift Mighty Meaty Hotdogs	10	8	.556	4	Proceed to third place playoffs
5	Shell Rimula X Zoomers	5	13	.278	9	

Notes:

Semifinal round standings
Pos	Team	W	L	Qualification
1	San Miguel Beermen	7	1	
2	7-Up Uncolas	6	2	Qualify to finals berth playoff (Note: San Miguel advanced to the finals outright as #1 seeded team; finals berth playoff: Purefoods 81–77 7-Up)
3	Purefoods Tender Juicy Hotdogs	4	4	
4	Swift Mighty Meaty Hotdogs	3	5	
5	Shell Rimula X Zoomers	0	8	

== Finals berth playoff ==
Vintage

August 13

Purefoods TJ Hotdogs 81, 7-Up Uncolas 77

The NASA, Pasig

== Third place playoffs ==
Vintage

August 16

7-Up Uncolas 88, Swift Mighty Meaty Hotdogs 96

The NASA, Pasig

Vintage

August 18

7-Up Uncolas 98, Swift Mighty Meaty Hotdogs 103

The NASA, Pasig

Vintage

August 20

7-Up Uncolas 94, Swift Mighty Meaty Hotdogs 106
Swift wins series, 3–0

The NASA, Pasig

== Finals ==
Vintage

August 16

San Miguel Beermen 85, Purefoods TJ Hotdogs 77

The NASA, Pasig

Vintage

August 18

San Miguel Beermen 94, Purefoods TJ Hotdogs 100

The NASA, Pasig

Vintage

August 20

San Miguel Beermen 111, Purefoods TJ Hotdogs 112

The NASA, Pasig

Vintage

August 23

San Miguel Beermen 114, Purefoods TJ Hotdogs 102

The NASA, Pasig

Vintage

August 25

San Miguel Beermen 99, Purefoods TJ Hotdogs 98

The NASA, Pasig

Vintage

August 27

San Miguel Beermen 99, Purefoods TJ Hotdogs 107

The NASA, Pasig

Vintage

August 30

San Miguel Beermen 105, Purefoods TJ Hotdogs 86
San Miguel wins series, 4–3

The NASA, Pasig
