= 1992 PBA Third Conference =

- Duration: September 20 – December 13, 1992
- TV partner(s): Vintage Sports (PTV)

Finals
- Champions: Swift Mighty Meaty Hotdogs
- Runners-up: 7-Up Uncolas

Awards
- Best Import: Tony Harris (Swift Mighty Meaty Hotdogs)

PBA Third Conference chronology
- < 1991

PBA conference chronology
- < 1992 All-Filipino 1993 All-Filipino >

The 1992 Philippine Basketball Association (PBA) Third Conference was the third and last conference of the 1992 PBA season. It started in September 20 and ended on December 13, 1992. The tournament is an import-laden format, which requires an import or a pure-foreign player for each team.

== Format ==
The following format will be observed for the duration of the conference:

- The teams were divided into 2 groups.

Group A:

1. Ginebra San Miguel
2. Presto Ice Cream Kings
3. Purefoods TJ Hotdogs
4. San Miguel Beermen

Group B:

1. Alaska Milkmen
2. 7-Up Uncolas
3. Shell Rimula X Zoomers
4. Swift Mighty Meaty Hotdogs

- Teams in a group will play against each other once and against teams in the other group twice; 11 games per team; Teams are then seeded by basis on win–loss records. Ties are broken among point differentials of the tied teams. Standings will be determined in one league table; teams do not qualify by basis of groupings.
- The top five teams after the eliminations will advance to the semifinals.
- Semifinals will be two round robin affairs with the remaining teams. Results from the elimination round will be carried over. A playoff incentive for a finals berth will be given to the team that will win at least five of their eight semifinal games.
- The top two teams (or the top team and the winner of the playoff incentive) will face each other in a best-of-seven championship series. The next two teams will qualify for a best-of-five playoff for third place.

== Elimination round ==
=== Team standings ===
Pos	Team	W	L	PCT	GB	Qualification
1	Swift Mighty Meaty Hotdogs	9	2	.818	—	Semifinal round
2	7-Up Uncolas	7	4	.636	2	Semifinal round
3	Ginebra San Miguel	7	4	.636	2	Semifinal round
4	San Miguel Beermen	5	6	.455 (Note: Head-to-head quotient: Purefoods 1.013, Shell 1.007, San Miguel 0.996, Alaska 0.983; semifinal round berth playoffs: Purefoods 119–110 Alaska, San Miguel 115-102 Shell)	4	Semifinal round
5	Purefoods Tender Juicy Hotdogs	5	6	.455	4	Semifinal round
6	Alaska Milkmen	5	6	.455	4	
7	Shell Rimula X Zoomers	5	6	.455	4	
8	Presto Ice Cream Kings	1	10	.091	8	

== Semifinal round berth playoffs ==
Vintage

November 8

Purefoods TJ Hotdogs 119, Alaska Milk 110

The ULTRA, Pasig

Vintage

November 8

San Miguel Beermen 115, Shell Rimula X Zoomers 102

The ULTRA, Pasig

== Semifinal round ==
=== Team standings ===
Overall standings
Pos	Team	W	L	PCT	GB	Qualification
1	Swift Mighty Meaty Hotdogs	14	5	.737	—	Advance to the Finals (Note: If a team outside the top two teams wins at least five semifinal round games, then it and the second-placed team will playoff for the last Finals berth; otherwise, the top 2 teams qualify outright.)
2	7-Up Uncolas	12	7	.632	2	Guaranteed Finals berth playoff
3	San Miguel Beermen	11	8	.579	3	Qualify to Finals berth playoff
4	Ginebra San Miguel	10	9	.526	4	Proceed to third place playoffs
5	Purefoods Tender Juicy Hotdogs	6	13	.316	8	

Notes:

Semifinal round standings
Pos	Team	W	L	Qualification
1	San Miguel Beermen	6	2	Qualify to Finals berth playoff (Note: Swift advanced to the Finals outright as #1 seeded team, 7-Up guaranteed playoff as #2 seeded team; Finals berth playoff: 7-Up 102–91 San Miguel)
2	Swift Mighty Meaty Hotdogs	5	3	
3	7-Up Uncolas	5	3	
4	Ginebra San Miguel	3	5	
5	Purefoods Tender Juicy Hotdogs	1	7	

== Finals berth playoff ==
Vintage

December 3

recap

7-Up Uncolas 102, San Miguel Beermen 91

The ULTRA, Pasig

== Third place playoffs ==
Vintage

December 6

San Miguel Beermen 124, Ginebra San Miguel 130

The ULTRA, Pasig

Vintage

December 8

San Miguel Beermen 99, Ginebra San Miguel 114

The ULTRA, Pasig

Vintage

December 10

San Miguel Beermen 93, Ginebra San Miguel 107
Ginebra wins series, 3–0

The ULTRA, Pasig

== Finals ==
Vintage

December 6

Swift Mighty Meaty Hotdogs 121, 7-Up Uncolas 109

The ULTRA, Pasig

Vintage

December 8

Swift Mighty Meaty Hotdogs 101, 7-Up Uncolas 97

The ULTRA, Pasig

Vintage

December 10

Swift Mighty Meaty Hotdogs 125, 7-Up Uncolas 107

The ULTRA, Pasig

Vintage

December 13

Swift Mighty Meaty Hotdogs 119, 7-Up Uncolas 106
Swift wins series, 4–0

The ULTRA, Pasig
