= List of Philippine Basketball Association imports career 3-point scoring leaders =

This is a list of Philippine Basketball Association imports by the highest total number of three-point field goals made in their stint or tenure with the league.

Statistics accurate as of January 16, 2023.

Italics^	Active PBA import

Rank	Player	Position(s)	Years played	Team(s) played	Games played	Total Three-point field goals made	Total Three-point field goals attempted	Three-point field goal percentage	Reference
1	Justin Brownlee	SF/PF	2016–present	Barangay Ginebra San Miguel	182	476	1,304	36.5	
2	Lamont Strothers	SG	1997–2002	San Miguel Beermen	138	325	1,060	30.7	
3	Billy Ray Bates	SG/SF	1983, 1986–1988	Crispa Redmanizers, Barangay Ginebra San Miguel	98	297	759	39.1	
4	Sean Green	SG/SF	1997	Sta. Lucia Realtors		245			
5	Rob Williams	PG	1986	Tanduay Rhum Masters	48	215			
6	Henry Walker	SF	2014, 2016–2018, 2021	Alaska Aces, NLEX Road Warriors, Blackwater Elite, Rain or Shine Elasto Painters	65	183	546	33.5	
7	Kenny Redfield	SF	1992–1996	Pepsi Bottlers, Purefood Hotshots, Shell Turbo Chargers	101	173	570	30.4	
8	Arizona Reid	SF	2013–2018	Rain or Shine Elasto Painters, San Miguel Beermen	69	151	489	30.9	
9	Tony Harris	SG	1992–1998	Swift Mighty Meaties, Sunkist Orange Juicers, Pop Cola 800s	59	151	450	33.6	
10	Jerald Honeycutt	PF	2001–2005	Barangay Ginebra San Miguel, Talk 'N Text Phone Pals	82	138	471	29.3	
11	Larry Robinson	SG	1997–1999	San Miguel Beermen, Mobiline Phone Pals	55	132	370	35.7	

== See also ==
- List of Philippine Basketball Association players
