= Domingo F. Panganiban =

Filipino agriculturist and sportsperson

Senior Undersecretary for Agriculture
- In office August 15, 2022 – December 31, 2023
- President: Bongbong Marcos
- Preceded by: Leocadio Sebastian
- In office April 16, 1996 – January 7, 2001
- President: Fidel V. Ramos; Joseph Estrada

Lead Convenor of National Anti-Poverty Commission
- In office November 2006 – June 30, 2010
- President: Gloria Macapagal Arroyo
- Preceded by: Cerge Remonde
- Succeeded by: Joel Rocamora

Secretary of Agriculture
- In office July 16, 2005 – October 25, 2006
- President: Gloria Macapagal Arroyo
- Preceded by: Arthur C. Yap
- Succeeded by: Arthur C. Yap
- In office January 8, 2001 – March 31, 2001
- President: Joseph Estrada; Gloria Macapagal Arroyo
- Preceded by: Edgardo Angara
- Succeeded by: Leonardo Montemayor

Administrator of National Food Authority Acting
- In office November 9, 2000 – March 31, 2001
- President: Joseph Estrada; Gloria Macapagal Arroyo
- Preceded by: Eduardo Nonato Joson

Presidential Assistant for Agriculture
- In office February 15, 1996 – April 15, 1996
- President: Fidel V. Ramos

Personal details
- Born: August 9, 1939 (age 87) Tanauan, Batangas, Philippines
- Education: University of the Philippines Los Baños (BSAg); University of the Philippines Manila (MPA)
- Occupation: Government official, basketball coach and executive
- Basketball career
- Coaching career: 1988–1993

Career history

Coaching
- 1984: Masagana 99
- 1988–1993: Purefoods Tender Juicy Hotdogs (consultant)
- 1992: Purefoods Tender Juicy Hotdogs

Career highlights
- As executive: 3× PBA champion (1990 Third Conference, 1991 All-Filipino, 1993 All-Filipino)

Domingo Flores Panganiban, also known as Ding Panganiban, (born August 9, 1939) is a Filipino agriculturist, government official and former basketball executive and coach. He served as the Secretary of the Department of Agriculture under the administration of Presidents Joseph Estrada and Gloria Macapagal Arroyo.

He previously served as the Senior Undersecretary of the same Department under President Bongbong Marcos, who served as the Secretary of Agriculture.

== Early life and education ==
Panganiban was born on August 9, 1939, in Tanauan, Batangas. He finished his bachelor's degree in agriculture from the College of Agriculture of the University of the Philippines Los Baños in 1961.

== Government career ==
He worked as plant pest control worker, plant pest control officer and later as farm supervisor in Bureau of Plant Industry. He rose through the ranks and became the Bureau Director from 1975 to 1986. From 1973 to 1986, Panganiban became the Executive Director of National Food and Agriculture Council (now Philippine Council for Agriculture and Fisheries). He also served as Deputy Minister of Agriculture and Food from 1984 to 1986, where he became one of the proponents of the Masagana 99 program.

In 1996, President Fidel V. Ramos appointed Panganiban as the Presidential Assistant for Agriculture. In that same year, he served as Undersecretary for Agriculture until 2001.

From 2000 to 2001, he was appointed as the Administrator of the National Food Authority.

He served as Secretary of Agriculture from 2001 and again from 2005 to 2006. He then became the chief of staff of Senator Loren Legarda from 2001 to 2004. He was appointed as lead convenor of National Anti-Poverty Commission from 2006 to 2010.

On August 15, 2022, President Bongbong Marcos appointed him as the Senior Undersecretary of the Department of Agriculture. He served until his retirement from government service on December 31, 2023.

== Coaching career ==
Panganiban coached the Masagana 99 in the PBL.

After the People Power Revolution, Panganiban was tapped as the team manager and consultant of Purefoods in Philippine Basketball Association (PBA). He briefly acted as head coach of the team in 1992 after the resignation of Ely Capacio. He stayed as manager until 1993.

== Coaching record ==
=== PBA ===
Season	Team	Conference	GP	W	L	PCT	Finish	PG	W	L	PCT	Results
1992	Purefoods	All-Filipino	10	8	2	.800	1st	16	8	8	.500	Lost in finals
1992	Purefoods	Third	11	5	6	.455	5th	8	1	7	.125	Lost in semifinals
Career Total			21	13	8	.619	Playoff Total	24	9	15	.375	0 championship

Government offices
Preceded by Arthur C. Yap	Secretary of Agriculture; 2005–2006	Succeeded by Arthur C. Yap
Preceded by Edgardo Angara	Secretary of Agriculture; 2001	Succeeded by Leonardo Montemayor

Sporting positions
Preceded by Ely Capacio	Purefoods Tender Juicy Hotdogs head coach 1992	Succeeded by Chot Reyes
