= 1992 Swift Mighty Meaty Hotdogs season =

- Head coach: Yeng Guiao
- General manager: Elmer Yanga
- Owner: RFM Corporation

First Conference results
- Record: 12–13 (48%)
- Place: 4th
- Playoff finish: Semifinals

All-Filipino Conference results
- Record: 13–8 (61.9%)
- Place: 3rd
- Playoff finish: Semifinals

Third Conference results
- Record: 18–5 (78.3%)
- Place: 1st
- Playoff finish: Champions

Swift Mighty Meaty Hotdogs seasons

The 1992 Swift Mighty Meaty Hotdogs season was the 3rd season of the franchise in the Philippine Basketball Association (PBA).

== Draft picks ==
| Round | Pick | Player | College |
|---|---|---|---|
| 1 | 6 | Eric Reyes | Ateneo |
| 2 | 11 | Bonel Balingit | Visayas |
| 3 | 16 | Delfin Rizane | SWU |

== Notable dates ==
March 19: Facing elimination, Swift escaped with a 115–114 win over corporate rival Purefoods on import David Henderson's off-balance shot from 15-feet with four seconds remaining.

March 24: The Mighty Meaties clinch a playoff and a knockout game with Purefoods for the last seat in the semifinals by beating the already eliminated Ginebra San Miguel, 136–122.

March 26: Swift enters the semifinal round by defeating Purefoods, 123–117, in their playoff game. Al Solis waxed hot all night with six triples in a 30-point performance.

== Tony Harris' scoring records ==
September 20: Dubbed as the "Hurricane", Swift import Tony Harris quickly made an impressive debut and exploded for 87 points in his first game, leading the Meaties to a 134–106 rout off All-Filipino Conference champion San Miguel Beermen. Days before the start of the Third Conference, Swift coach Yeng Guiao was quote as describing Harris as "Black Superman 2" in reference to Billy Ray Bates, the legendary import who led the famed Crispa Redmanizers to a grandslam and crowd-favorite Ginebra San Miguel to their first championship.

October 9: The menacing hurricane sizzled with 82 points in Swift's 166–144 rout over Purefoods in Davao City as the Meaties remained unbeaten with their fifth straight win. Harris put in big numbers of 69, 57 and 54 points in their three previous games.

October 10: Tony Harris' record-breaking 105 points in leading Swift to a 151–147 win over Ginebra in Iloilo City broke the previous record of 103 points set by Michael Hackett on November 21, 1985. The Hurricane already had 58 points at the half and a total of 86 points going into the final period.

October 18: Tony Harris knocked in quarter outputs of 26, 22, 23 and 27 to finish with 98 points as he scored the league's new third all-time highest individual output in Swift Mighty Meaties' 179–161 win over Presto Ice Cream.

== First title ==
The Mighty Meaties top the eliminations with nine wins and two losses and booked the first finals seat on November 26 with their 14th win in 18 games, winning for the third time in four meetings with Ginebra San Miguel in a 145–139 victory as Tony Harris scored 68 points.

Swift easily won their first championship in three years as their opponent 7-Up Bottlers, playing for the first time in the finals, offered a very least challenge and got swept in four games. Swift coach Yeng Guiao won his PBA title as a coach and the Mighty Meaties became the second team to score a 4–0 sweep in the best-of-seven title series.

== Awards ==
- Tony Harris was the runaway choice for the Best Import Award in the Third Conference.
- Nelson Asaytono and Al Solis were named in the Mythical first team selection.

== Roster ==
1992 Swift Mighty Meaty Hotdogs roster
Players

| Pos. | # | POB | Name | Height | Weight | DOB (YYYY–MM–DD) | From |
|---|---|---|---|---|---|---|---|
| G | 8 | (Philippines) | Al Solis | 5 ft 11 in (1.80 m) | | | Visayas |
| F | 10 | (Philippines) | Eric Reyes | 6 ft 4 in (1.93 m) | | | Ateneo |
| F | 11 | (Philippines) | Nelson Asaytono | 6 ft 3 in (1.91 m) | | | Manila |
| C | 12 | (Philippines) | Bonel Balingit | 6 ft 9 in (2.06 m) | | | Visayas |
| F/C | 13 | (Philippines) | Elpidio Villamin | 6 ft 2 in (1.88 m) |
| G | 14 | (Philippines) | Rudy Distrito | 5 ft 11 in (1.80 m) | | | UE |
| G | 15 | (Philippines) | Juancho Estrada | 5 ft 11 in (1.80 m) | | | Adamson |
| F | 17 | (Philippines) | Terry Saldaña | 6 ft 3 in (1.91 m) | | | Letran |
| G | 20 | (Philippines) | Delfin Rizane | 6 ft 0 in (1.83 m) | | | Southwestern-U |
| G | 23 | (Philippines) | Ric-Ric Marata | 5 ft 8 in (1.73 m) | | | Southwestern-U |
| F | 24 | (Philippines) | Richard Bognot | 6 ft 4 in (1.93 m) |
| F | 26 | (Philippines) | Andy De Guzman | 6 ft 2 in (1.88 m) | | | Far Eastern |
| C | 41 | (Philippines) | Jack Tanuan | 6 ft 5 in (1.96 m) | | | Far Eastern |

Coaches

Head coach

- (Philippines) Yeng Guiao

Assistant coach(es)

- (Philippines) Roehl Nadurata
- (Philippines) Arturo Valenzona

Legend

- (C) Team captain
- Injured

== Transactions ==
=== Trades ===
| Off-season | To Ginebra Pido Jarencio | To Swift Rudy Distrito |

| Off season | To Shell Rey Cuenco | To Swift Richard Bognot |

=== Additions ===
| Name | Deal Information | Former team |
|---|---|---|
| Nelson Asaytono | Acquired from Purefoods in exchange for future picks in 1994 and 1995 | Purefoods |
| Juancho Estrada | Rookie Free Agent | N/A |

=== Recruited imports ===
| Name | Conference | No. | Pos. | Ht. | College | Duration |
|---|---|---|---|---|---|---|
| David Henderson | First Conference | 7 | Center-Forward | 6"5' | Duke University | February 9 to May 5 |
| Tony Harris | Third Conference | 22 | Guard-Forward | 6"2' | University of New Orleans | September 22 to December 13 |
