= 1992 Alaska Milkmen season =

- Head coach: Tim Cone
- General manager: Joaqui Trillo
- Owner: Alaska Milk Corporation

First Conference results
- Record: 14–11 (56%)
- Place: 3rd
- Playoff finish: Semifinals

All-Filipino Conference results
- Record: 2–8 (20%)
- Place: 8th
- Playoff finish: N/A

Third Conference results
- Record: 5–7 (41.7%)
- Place: 6th
- Playoff finish: N/A

Alaska Milkmen seasons

The 1992 Alaska Milkmen season was the 7th season of the franchise in the Philippine Basketball Association (PBA).

== Draft picks ==
Round	Pick	Player	College
1	2	Stevenson Solomon	San Sebastian
1	7	Allen Sasan	Cebu
2	15	Ronald Cahanding	Adamson

== Notable dates ==
February 11: Alaska Milk with former Presto import Winston Crite on his third stint in the league and now playing for the Airmen going up against the new-look Ginebras with returning import Jervis Cole in a highly-anticipated first game between the two teams, Alaska prevailed, 127-122, over the defending first conference champions.

March 17: Alaska pulled off a 121-111 overtime triumph over Ginebra San Miguel that sent them a game closer to the semifinal round with their fifth win in 10 games while the Gins bowed out of contention with their seventh loss against three wins.

March 29: Alex Araneta lifted Alaska to a 97-96 come-from-behind win over Presto Ice Cream at the start of the semifinal round of the First Conference. Araneta knocked in a medium-range jumper over the outstretched arms of Abe King to cap a sterling night for the Airmen, which won for the third straight time while the Ice Cream Kings absorbed their third straight setback.

June 7: Paul Alvarez knocked in a layup with three seconds left to cap his heroics for the Airmen in a 101-99 win over Seven-Up in the opening game of the All-Filipino Conference.

September 20: Sean Chambers returns anew and went up for the first time against former best import awardee Jamie Waller of Ginebra, who was coming back after four years, in the main game of the Third Conference opening double-header. The Airmen nip Ginebra, 93-92, on Bobby Jose's two free throws with one second left.

October 15: Alaska coasted to a 115-102 triumph over erstwhile unbeaten Swift. The Airmen dealt the Mighty Meaties their first loss after six straight wins as they held down prolific import Tony Harris to his conference low 38 points after making history five days earlier in Iloilo City by scoring a record-breaking 105 points.

== Roster ==
1992 Alaska Milkmen roster
Players

Pos.	#	POB	Name	Height	Weight	DOB (YYYY–MM–DD)	From
G	5	(Philippines)	Gilbert Reyes	5 ft 8 in (1.73 m)			Ateneo
G	7	(Philippines)	Roehl Gomez	6 ft 0 in (1.83 m)			Cebu
F	8	(Philippines)	Nandy Garcia	6 ft 2 in (1.88 m)			Adamson
G/F	9	(Philippines)	Jojo Lastimosa	6 ft 0 in (1.83 m)			USJ–R
C	10	(Philippines)	Adriano Polistico	6 ft 7 in (2.01 m)			Letran
G	12	(Philippines)	Allen Sasan	5 ft 11 in (1.80 m)			Cebu
F	13	(Philippines)	Raymund Fran	6 ft 3 in (1.91 m)			UST
G	22	(Philippines)	Frankie Lim	5 ft 11 in (1.80 m)			San Beda
F	23	(Philippines)	Paul Alvarez	6 ft 0 in (1.83 m)			San Sebastian
F	32	(Philippines)	Bobby Jose	6 ft 3 in (1.91 m)			UST
F/C	34	(Philippines)	Stevenson Solomon	6 ft 4 in (1.93 m)			San Sebastian
G/F	35	(Philippines)	Ronnie Cahanding	6 ft 0 in (1.83 m)			Adamson
C	50	(Philippines)	Alex Araneta	6 ft 6 in (1.98 m)			Ateneo

Coaches

Head coach

- (United States) Tim Cone

Assistant coach(es)

- (Philippines) Chot Reyes
- (Philippines) Aric del Rosario

Team manager

- (Philippines) Joaquin Trillo

Legend

- (C) Team captain
- Injured

== Transactions ==
=== Trades ===
Off season	To Pepsi Hotshots Eugene Quilban	To Alaska Gilbert Reyes
Off-season	To San Miguel Beermen Biboy Ravanes	To Alaska Bobby Jose

=== Rookie free agent ===
Player	Signed	Former team
Raymund Fran	June 1992	N/A

=== Recruited imports ===
Name	Conference	No.	Pos.	Ht.	College	Duration
Winston Crite	First Conference	21	Center-Forward	6"5'	Texas A&M University	February 11 to May 5
Sean Chambers	Third Conference	20	Forward	6"1'	Cal Poly, San Luis Obispo	September 20 to November 8
