= 1992 Shell Rimula X season =

- Head coach: Rino Salazar
- General Manager: Charlie Favis
- Owner(s): Pilipinas Shell

First Conference results
- Record: 17–7 (70.8%)
- Place: 1st
- Playoff finish: Champions

All-Filipino Conference results
- Record: 5–13 (27.8%)
- Place: 5th
- Playoff finish: Semifinals

Third Conference results
- Record: 5–7 (41.7%)
- Place: 7th
- Playoff finish: Eliminated

Shell Rimula X seasons

The 1992 Shell Rimula X season was the 8th season of the franchise in the Philippine Basketball Association (PBA).

== Draft picks ==
Round	Pick	Player	College
1	3	Jolly Escobar	UE
2	14	Romulo Orillosa	Adamson

== Championship ==
Shell Rimula-X took home the First Conference crown with a 4–1 series win over San Miguel Beermen. Winning coach Rino Salazar won his first title as a coach and seven-time Best Import Bobby Parks delivered the second championship to the Shell franchise, winning it "officially" this time and victory was complete.

== Notable dates ==
April 21: Shell advances in the finals of the First Conference by scoring a 133-100 rout off San Miguel Beer in the last day of the semifinals, leaving the Beermen and the Alaska Milkmen in a playoff to dispute the other finals slot.

June 9: Shell Rimula-X roared to a 132-114 triumph over Presto Ice Cream in their first game in the All-Filipino Conference.

June 18: Shell escaped with a 97-96 win over Purefoods in the battle of early leaders to take solo lead in the All-Filipino Conference with three wins without a loss.

October 8: Import Steve Colter scored 50 points in leading Shell to a 114-98 win over San Miguel in his farewell game. Colter played five games and led the Turbo Chargers to two victories. The nine-year NBA veteran will be replaced by the comebacking Kelvin Upshaw, who played for Swift last season.

== Occurrences ==
During the Third Conference, Shell was one win away from a semifinals berth when import Kelvin Upshaw was found positive on a random drug test conducted and was banned by the PBA. Upshaw was replaced by Jason Matthews in their last two games and Shell lost a chance to make it to the next round and were eliminated by San Miguel Beermen in the playoff game on November 8.

== Roster ==
1992 Shell Rimula X roster
Players

Pos.	#	POB	Name	Height	Weight	DOB (YYYY–MM–DD)	From
G	5	(Philippines)	Ronnie Magsanoc	5 ft 9 in (1.75 m)			UP Diliman
G	9	(Philippines)	Leo Isaac	6 ft 1 in (1.85 m)			Mapúa
F	10	(Philippines)	Jojo Martin	6 ft 3 in (1.91 m)			NCBA
G	11	(Philippines)	Eric Altamirano	5 ft 11 in (1.80 m)			Philippines
F	12	(Philippines)	Romeo Dela Rosa	6 ft 2 in (1.88 m)			Southwestern-U
C	14	(Philippines)	Benjie Paras	6 ft 5 in (1.96 m)			UP Diliman
F/C	15	(Philippines)	Ricky Relosa	6 ft 3 in (1.91 m)			Mapúa
G	17	(Philippines)	Joey Loyzaga	6 ft 0 in (1.83 m)			San Beda
C	18	(Philippines)	Rey Cuenco	6 ft 4 in (1.93 m)			De La Salle Araneta
F	28	(Philippines)	Mulong Orillosa	6 ft 2 in (1.88 m)			Adamson
C	32	(Philippines)	Jolly Escobar	6 ft 5 in (1.96 m)			UE
G	33	(Philippines)	Calvin Tuadles	5 ft 11 in (1.80 m)			Southwestern-U
F	71	(Philippines)	Manuel Marquez	6 ft 2 in (1.88 m)			San Beda

Coaches

Head coach

- (Philippines) Rino Salazar

Assistant coach(es)

- (Philippines) Manuel Pineda
- (Philippines) Cris Calilan

Team manager

- (Philippines) Charlie Favis

Legend

- (C) Team captain
- Injured

== Transactions ==
=== Trades ===
Off season	To Pepsi Leo Austria	To Shell Leo Isaac
Off-season	To Swift Richard Bognot	To Shell Rey Cuenco

^{Swift own the rights to Rey Cuenco when they traded Sonny Cabatu to Ginebra. Likewise Pepsi own the rights to Leo Isaac when they traded Tonichi Yturri to Ginebra}

=== Additions ===
Player	Signed	Former team
Eric Altamirano	Off-season	Pepsi
Joey Loyzaga	Off-season	Swift

=== Recruited imports ===
Name	Conference	No.	Pos.	Ht.	College	Duration
Bobby Parks	First Conference	22	Forward	6"3'	Memphis State	February 9 to May 5
Steve Colter	Third Conference	20	Guard	6"2'	New Mexico State	September 20 to October 8
Kelvin Upshaw	Third Conference	7	Guard-Forward	6"2'	University of Utah	October 11-27
Jason Matthews	Third Conference		Guard-Forward	6"2'	University of Pittsburgh	November 5-8
