= Charlie Favis =

Filipino basketball journalist, author, and league commissioner

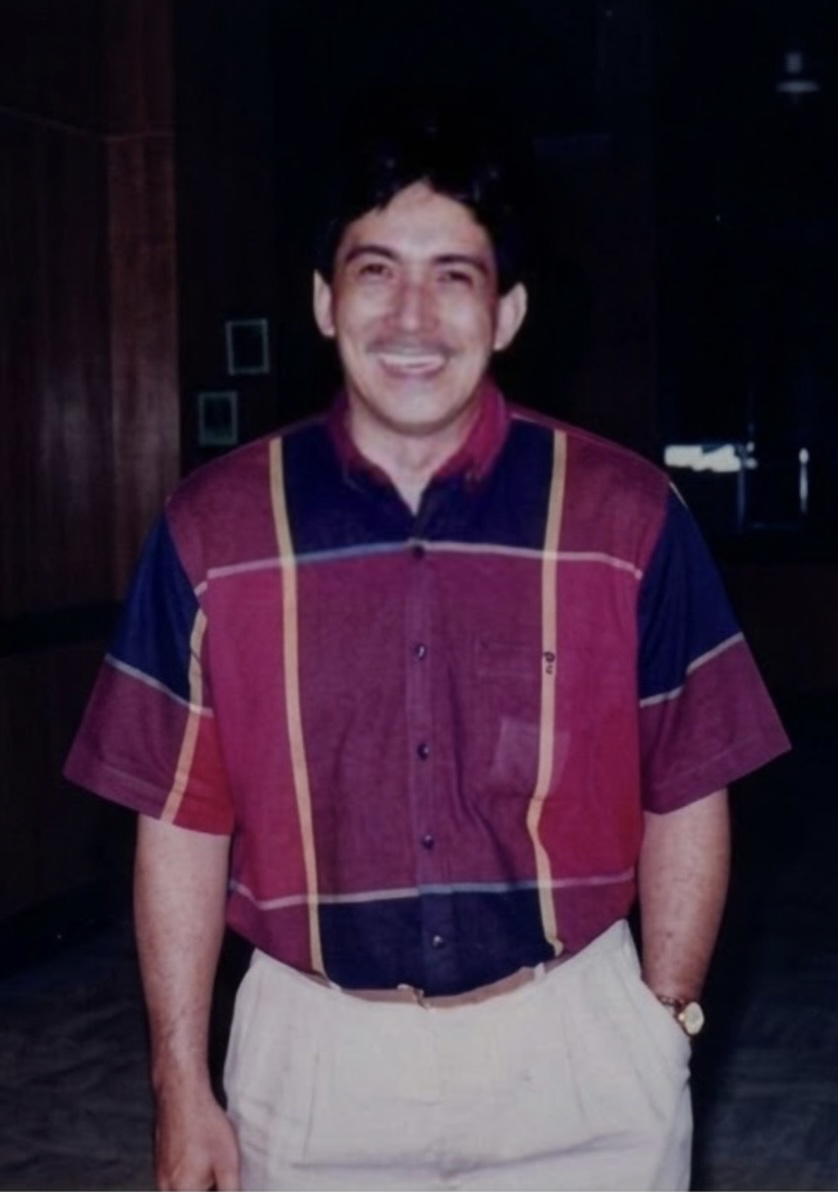

6th Commissioner of the Philippine Basketball League
- In office 1994–1996
- Preceded by: Philip Juico
- Succeeded by: Yeng Guiao

Personal details
- Education: De La Salle University
- Occupation: Sports journalist and executive
- Basketball career

Career highlights
- As executive: 2x PBA champion (1990 First, 1992 First)

Charlie S. Favis (born October 18, 1946) is a Filipino sports executive and journalist. He has notably served as general manager of Formula Shell Zoom Masters from 1988 until 1994. He also served as commissioner of the Philippine Basketball League (PBL) from 1994 until 1996.

== Early life and education ==
Favis attended the Ateneo de Manila High School before enrolling at the De La Salle University where he earned a Bachelor of Arts in Social Sciences and a Bachelor of Science in Business Administration in 1966.

During his time at La Salle, he was active in athletics and served as captain of the university’s NCAA Track and Field Team, winning the gold medal in the 400-meter hurdles. He also held leadership roles in campus sports organizations, serving as chairman of Varsity Athletics and president of the Collegiate Intramurals Athletic Association (CIAA).

== Corporate career ==
After graduating, Favis began his professional career with Procter & Gamble until 1970 before later joining the Shell Oil Group of Companies or Pilipinas Shell Petroleum Corporation until 1988. His work in marketing and corporate management eventually led to his involvement in sports administration through Shell’s sponsorship and ownership of basketball teams.

== Sports executive roles ==
=== Formula Shell Zoom Masters ===
When Shell acquired the Crispa franchise in the Philippine Basketball Association, Favis was appointed team manager of the company’s professional basketball team, known as the Formula Shell Zoom Masters (later known as the Turbo Chargers). During his tenure, the team won several championships and runner-up finishes in the PBA. He was notable for drafting UP Maroon Ronnie Magsanoc (2nd overall pick) in the 1988 PBA draft, and his teammate Benjie Paras (1st overall pick) in 1989. Under Favis' watch, he oversaw the first two championships won by Shell. Also, in the 1988 All-Filipino Conference, when Joe Lipa resigned, he coached the team for a short period resulting to a victory against the Añejo Rum 65ers. After this, Favis went to the United States to scout import players Bobby Parks and Derrick Rowland; Freddie Motos then took over coaching duties and led the team to a win against Presto Ice Cream.

=== Philippine Basketball League ===
In 1994, after serving at Shell, he was unanimously appointed as Commissioner of the Philippine Basketball League (PBL). During his term, the league was labeled as the "faster league", and served until 1996. As commissioner, he implemented a number of reforms that modernized the league, including changes in rules, improved television coverage, enhanced marketing strategies, redesigned league branding, and strengthened media relations. He also expanded the league’s international exposure by sending PBL teams to compete in tournaments in Malaysia, Indonesia, Hong Kong, China, Guam, Singapore, the Middle East, and other locations. Philippine teams won the 6th and 7th Asian Basketball Confederation (ABC) Champions Cup titles in 1995 and 1996 during this period. Favis also organized one of the first official league games abroad, held in Brunei. During his tenure, he also introduced the participation of Filipino-American players (Fil-Ams) in the PBL, a practice that was later adopted by other Philippine leagues, including the PBA and collegiate competitions.

=== Philippine Football Association ===
In the early 2000s, he became president of the Philippine Football Association (PIFA). The group was formed by several business leaders following the 2002 FIFA World Cup, which helped renew interest in football across Asia. As president of PIFA, Favis worked with organizers and supporters to establish structured competitions and raise the profile of the sport locally. The organization aimed to strengthen the Philippines’ football program and improve the competitiveness of Filipino teams internationally at a time when the national team ranked among the lower tiers of FIFA’s global standings. Among PIFA’s initiatives were plans to stage national competitions, including SoccerFest 2003 and the Champions Cup 2003, which were designed to provide opportunities for teams to compete while also identifying and developing local talent. The program sought to encourage broader participation in football and contribute to the long-term growth of the sport in the Philippines.

== Coaching career ==
Drawing on his experience as a basketball executive, Charlie Favis co-founded The Hoops School in 2002 with former PBA import Bobby Parks Sr. The training program later partnered with the sporting goods brand Spalding to organize the Spalding Basketball Camps in the Philippines. The camps were formally launched in 2011 under Favis’s direction as structured basketball training programs for young players.

Designed for children and teenagers aged 6 to 17, the camps offer tiered training programs—basic, intermediate, and advanced—to develop fundamental basketball skills. Sessions typically include multiple training classes over several weeks and utilize specialized training equipment such as the NOAH computerized shooting analyzer and other instructional tools. The camps have been held at various venues across Metro Manila and nearby provinces. Over the years, the program has trained thousands of young players and contributed to grassroots basketball development in the Philippines, with some participants later advancing to school varsity and collegiate teams.

== Journalism and writing ==
Favis continues to be mentioned in sports media for his involvement in notable moments in Philippine basketball history. In a 2020 ESPN article marking the 30th anniversary of the controversial 1990 PBA Finals walkout by the Añejo Rum 65ers, he recalled the tense atmosphere surrounding the incident, including the intense crowd reaction and heavy media attention at the time while he was serving as team manager of the Formula Shell franchise.

Favis has also been active in sports media. He has written a weekly basketball column for the Philippine tabloid Abante, where he provides commentary and analysis on Philippine basketball.

He is also the author of The Complete Basketball Training Book, a guide focused on basketball fundamentals, skills development, and training techniques. The book was published in 2018 by Anvil Publishing Inc. and is sold in National Bookstore outlets nationwide. The book focuses on fundamental basketball skills, training techniques, and drills designed to help players improve their performance and understanding of the game.

== Personal life ==
Favis was born in Vigan, Philippines, where the Favis family is historically known. He has described basketball as a lifelong passion and has remained involved in the sport through coaching and writing. Outside basketball, he has expressed a strong interest in jazz music and has described himself as a God-fearing person.

Favis has five children—three sons and two daughters.
