= 1992 PBA First Conference finals =

Basketball tournament

Team	Coach	Wins
Shell Rimula X Zoomers	Rino Salazar	4
San Miguel Beermen	Norman Black	1
- Dates: April 26–May 5, 1992
- Television: Vintage Sports (PTV)
- Radio network: DZAM

PBA First Conference finals chronology
- < 1991

PBA finals chronology
- < 1991 Third 1992 All-Filipino >

The 1992 PBA First Conference finals was the best-of-7 series basketball championship of the 1992 PBA First Conference, and the conclusion of the conference playoffs. Shell Rimula X Zoomers and San Miguel Beermen played for the 51st championship contested by the league.

Shell Rimula X Zoomers won their second PBA title in three years, defeating San Miguel Beermen in their finals series, four games to one.

== Qualification ==
Shell		San Miguel
Finished 7–4 (.636), tied for 1st	Eliminations	Finished 7–4 (.636), tied for 1st
Finished 13–6 (.684), 1st	Semifinals	Finished 11–8 (.579), tied for 2nd
Finished 13–6 (.684), 1st	Playoff	Won against Alaska, 118-97

== Series scoring summary ==
Team	Game 1	Game 2	Game 3	Game 4	Game 5	Wins
Shell	112	98	93	104	102	4
San Miguel	105	89	115	98	92	1
Venue	NASA	NASA	NASA	NASA	NASA

== Games summary ==
=== Game 1 ===
Vintage

April 26
6:30 pm

Shell Rimula X Zoomers 112, San Miguel Beermen 105 (OT)
Pts: Bobby Parks 55	Pts: Samboy Lim 30 Ato Agustin 30

The NASA, Pasig, Metro Manila

San Miguel led 48-47 at halftime and 73-71 going into the final period, the Turbo Chargers went up by six points, 91-85, and had the game almost won in regulation, the Beermen forces extension on a 6-0 spurt with Yves Dignadice being fouled with no time left, Dignadice converted his two charities, forcing overtime. In the extra period, Bobby Parks was the difference as he pumped in 15 of Shell's 21 overtime points.

=== Game 2 ===
Vintage

April 28
7:30 pm

Shell Rimula X Zoomers 98, San Miguel Beermen 89
Pts: Bobby Parks 46	Pts: Rick Calloway 36 Samboy Lim 25

The NASA, Pasig, Metro Manila

Shell forward Ricky Relosa was thrown out when he deliberately aimed his elbow at Samboy Lim's injured left shoulder, Relosa was banned for the whole series, two Beermen namely Biboy Ravanes and Yves Dignadice had a bout with a fan who had been heckling Ramon Fernandez. Ravanes and Dignadice were suspended for one game while Fernandez was fined but managed to escape suspension.

=== Game 3 ===
Vintage

April 30
7:30 pm

Shell Rimula X Zoomers 93, San Miguel Beermen 115

The NASA, Pasig, Metro Manila

The Beermen had a big run in the third quarter to pull away, got their biggest lead of 27 points at 108-81.

=== Game 4 ===
Vintage

May 3
6:30 pm

Shell Rimula X Zoomers 104, San Miguel Beermen 98

The NASA, Pasig, Metro Manila

With Shell ahead, 100-98, a miscue between Ato Agustin and their import Rick Calloway, resulted to Agustin throwing a wayward pass, Ronnie Magsanoc recovered ball possession for Shell and his two free throws off a foul by Ramon Fernandez gave them a four-point edge, the Beermen had another miscue on their next offensive as Rey Cuenco intercepted their inbound pass and Magsanoc sealing the win with another pair of free throws.

=== Game 5 ===
Vintage

May 5
7:30 pm

Shell Rimula X Zoomers 102, San Miguel Beermen 92
Pts: Bobby Parks 49	Pts: Rick Calloway 29
Shell wins series, 4-1

The NASA, Pasig, Metro Manila

A decisive 7-0 run early in the fourth quarter put Shell further ahead, 85-76, the Beermen bogged down with three successive turnovers as the Turbo Chargers launch another barrage that gave them a 94-82 lead going into the last four minutes.

1992 PBA First Conference Champions

Shell Rimula X Zoomers
Second title

== Rosters ==
Shell Rimula X roster
Players
Coaches

Pos.	No.	Nat.	Name	Ht.	Wt.
G	5	(Philippines)	Ronnie Magsanoc	5 ft 9 in (1.75 m)		UP Diliman
G	9	(Philippines)	Leo Isaac	6 ft 1 in (1.85 m)		Mapúa
F	10	(Philippines)	Jojo Martin	6 ft 3 in (1.91 m)		NCBA
F	12	(Philippines)	Romeo Dela Rosa	6 ft 2 in (1.88 m)		Southwestern-U
C	14	(Philippines)	Benjie Paras	6 ft 5 in (1.96 m)		UP Diliman
F	15	(Philippines)	Ricky Relosa	6 ft 3 in (1.91 m)		Mapúa
G	17	(Philippines)	Joey Loyzaga	6 ft 0 in (1.83 m)		San Beda
F/C	18	(Philippines)	Rey Cuenco	6 ft 4 in (1.93 m)		De La Salle Araneta
F	22	(United States)	Bobby Parks (I)	6 ft 3 in (1.91 m)		Memphis
F	28	(Philippines)	Mulong Orillosa	6 ft 2 in (1.88 m)		Adamson
F/C	32	(Philippines)	Jolly Escobar	6 ft 5 in (1.96 m)		UE
G	33	(Philippines)	Calvin Tuadles	5 ft 11 in (1.80 m)		Southwestern-U
F	71	(Philippines)	Manuel Marquez	6 ft 2 in (1.88 m)		San Beda

Head coach

- (Philippines) Rino Salazar

Assistant coach(es)

- (Philippines) Cris Calilan

Legend

- (C) Team captain
- (I) Import
- Injured

San Miguel Beermen roster
Players
Coaches

Pos.	No.	Nat.	Name	Ht.	Wt.
G/F	1	(Philippines)	Bong Ravena	6 ft 1 in (1.85 m)		UE
C	4	(Philippines)	Julian Tomacruz	6 ft 6 in (1.98 m)		UST
G	5	(Philippines)	Franz Pumaren	5 ft 9 in (1.75 m)		De La Salle
G	6	(Philippines)	Ato Agustin	5 ft 11 in (1.80 m)		Lyceum
F	9	(Philippines)	Samboy Lim	6 ft 0 in (1.83 m)		Letran
F	10	(Philippines)	Alvin Teng	6 ft 4 in (1.93 m)		Arellano
G	11	(Philippines)	Biboy Ravanes	6 ft 0 in (1.83 m)		Cebu
F	12	(Philippines)	Yves Dignadice	6 ft 4 in (1.93 m)		STI WNU
G	14	(Philippines)	Hector Calma	5 ft 9 in (1.75 m)		Adamson
F	17	(Philippines)	Jeffrey Graves	6 ft 3 in (1.91 m)		Angeles
F	18	(Philippines)	Art Dela Cruz	6 ft 2 in (1.88 m)		San Sebastian
F/C	19	(Philippines)	Ramon Fernandez	6 ft 4 in (1.93 m)		San Carlos
F	20	(United States)	Rick Calloway (I)	6 ft 4 in (1.93 m)		Kansas
F	29	(Philippines)	Josel Angeles	6 ft 3 in (1.91 m)		Lyceum

Head coach

- (United States) Norman Black

Assistant coach(es)

Legend

- (C) Team captain
- (I) Import
- Injured

== Broadcast notes ==
Game	Play-by-play	Analyst
Game 1	Sev Sarmenta	Andy Jao
Game 2	Ed Picson	Butch Maniego
Game 3	Bill Velasco	Andy Jao
Game 4	Sev Sarmenta	Quinito Henson
Game 5	Ed Picson	Andy Jao
