= 1992 PBA All-Filipino Conference finals =

Basketball cup finals

| Team | Coach | Wins |
|---|---|---|
| San Miguel Beermen | Norman Black | 4 |
| Purefoods TJ Hotdogs | Ding Panganiban | 3 |
- Dates: August 16–30, 1992
- Television: Vintage Sports (PTV)
- Radio network: DZAM

PBA All-Filipino Conference finals chronology
- < 1991 1993 >

PBA finals chronology
- < 1992 First 1992 Third >

The 1992 PBA All-Filipino Conference finals was the best-of-7 basketball championship series of the 1992 PBA All-Filipino Conference, and the conclusion of the conference playoffs. The San Miguel Beermen and Purefoods Tender Juicy Hotdogs played for the 52nd championship contested by the league.

San Miguel Beermen won their 9th PBA title, defeating defending champion Purefoods Tender Juicy Hotdogs in a seven-game series. It was the Beermen's first championship in the 1990s, after winning the Grandslam three years ago.

== Qualification ==
| San Miguel | | Purefoods |
|---|---|---|
| Finished 7–3 (.700), tied for 2nd | Eliminations | Finished 8–2 (.800), 1st |
| Finished 14–4 (.778), 1st | Semifinals | Finished 12–6 (.667), tied for 2nd |
| Finished 14–4 (.778), 1st | Playoff | Won against 7-Up, 81–77 |

== Series scoring summary ==
| Team | Game 1 | Game 2 | Game 3 | Game 4 | Game 5 | Game 6 | Game 7 | Wins |
|---|---|---|---|---|---|---|---|---|
| San Miguel Beer | 85 | 94 | 111 | 114 | 99 | 99 | 105 | 4 |
| Purefoods TJ Hotdogs | 77 | 100 | 112 | 102 | 98 | 107 | 86 | 3 |
| Venue | NASA | NASA | NASA | NASA | NASA | NASA | NASA |

== Games summary ==
=== Game 1 ===
Vintage

August 16

San Miguel Beermen 85, Purefoods TJ Hotdogs 77
San Miguel leads series, 1–0

The NASA, Pasig

The Beermen took control in the series opener during the second quarter and leads by as much as 14 points in the final period. When the score was standing at 79–66 for San Miguel, Alvin Patrimonio took charge by scoring seven straight points as the Hotdogs close to within six, 73–79. Samboy Lim scored on a layup and clutch baskets by Hector Calma and Ato Agustin sealed the victory.

=== Game 2 ===
Vintage

August 18

San Miguel Beermen 94, Purefoods TJ Hotdogs 100
| Pts: Alvin Patrimonio 30 |
Series tied, 1–1

The NASA, Pasig

The Hotdogs trailed for most of the game but Alvin Patrimonio pumped in 21 points in the fourth quarter in a come-from-behind Purefoods victory.

=== Game 3 ===
Vintage

August 20

San Miguel Beermen 111, Purefoods TJ Hotdogs 112
Scoring by quarter: 14–27, 34–23, 28–27, 35–35
| Pts: Ramon Fernandez 28 | Pts: Alvin Patrimonio 36 |
Purefoods leads series, 2–1

The NASA, Pasig

Purefoods took the first quarter at 27–14, but the Beermen battled back and it was close in the first three quarters. In the fourth period, Alvin Patrimonio's three-point play and Elmer Cabahug's triple gave the Hotdogs a 91–84 lead, they keep answering every baskets made by the Beermen until a 10–2 run by San Miguel in the closing minutes. From a 108–101 count in favor of Purefoods, the Beermen regain the upper hand at 111–110, Ramon Fernandez bungled a pass in the dying seconds that led to Alvin Patrimonio scoring two free throws. In the final play, Fernandez missed on a turn around shot with five seconds remaining, giving Purefoods the win.

=== Game 4 ===
Vintage

August 23

San Miguel Beermen 114, Purefoods TJ Hotdogs 102
Scoring by quarter: 29–20, 30–27, 30–28, 25–27
| Pts: Samboy Lim 35 | Pts: Boy Cabahug 30 |
Series tied, 2–2

The NASA, Pasig

Purefoods fell behind by 19 points and were down by 14 points, 75–89, going into the final quarter. The Hotdogs rallied to within four, 96–100, mainly on the exploits of Boy Cabahug. The Beermen answered with a 7–0 run, with Ato Agustin scoring on a drive, Yves Dignadice converting a three-point play off a sixth foul by Alvin Patrimonio, and two free throws by Samboy Lim put the game away, 107–96 with 1:58 left.

=== Game 5 ===
Vintage

August 25

San Miguel Beermen 99, Purefoods TJ Hotdogs 98
Scoring by quarter: 32–20, 25–18, 24–31, 18–29
| Pts: Samboy Lim 23 | Pts: Boy Cabahug 35 |
San Miguel leads series, 3–2

The NASA, Pasig

Hector Calma completed a crucial interception with two seconds left as San Miguel escaped with a one-point victory. Calma snatched a pass by Jerry Codinera to a streaking Dindo Pumaren at midline to preserved a near-fatal finish by the Beermen, who went scoreless in the last 2:50. The Hotdogs trailed by as many as 21 points in the second quarter, but battled back behind Boy Cabahug, who scored 35 points, and Alvin Patrimonio. Purefoods forces the Beermen to two 25-second violation in the last 2:50 and Patrimonio and Cabahug translate this San Miguel-fold up into a nine-point blast by the Hotdogs to come within a point, 98–99.

=== Game 6 ===
Vintage

August 27

San Miguel Beermen 99, Purefoods TJ Hotdogs 107
| Pts: Ato Agustin 30 | Pts: Boy Cabahug 28 |
Series tied, 3–3

The NASA, Pasig

San Miguel went ahead by six points in the fourth period, 87–81, and last took a 95–92 lead. Alvin Patrimonio scored 11 straight points going into the last two minutes. The Beermen failed to score in the last 1:05.

=== Game 7 ===
Vintage

August 30

San Miguel Beermen 105, Purefoods TJ Hotdogs 86
Scoring by quarter: 27–23, 22–22, 23–22, 33–19
| Pts: Ato Agustin 34 | Pts: Boy Cabahug 30 |
San Miguel wins series, 4–3

The NASA, Pasig

San Miguel opened the third quarter with Samboy Lim and Ato Agustin providing the points and zoomed to double-digit leads, the last at 70–58 on a triple by Bong Ravena, a 9–2 run by the Hotdogs close the gap to 67–72, going into the last 12 minutes. The Beermen broke the game wide-open in the fourth quarter with a 9–0 blast as Ramon Fernandez converted on a three-point play to give San Miguel an 81–67 lead. Ato Agustin's jumper gave the Beermen their largest margin at 93–74.

1992 PBA All-Filipino Conference Champions

San Miguel Beermen
Ninth title

== Rosters ==
San Miguel Beermen roster
Players

| Pos. | # | POB | Name | Height | Weight | DOB (YYYY–MM–DD) | From |
|---|---|---|---|---|---|---|---|
| G/F | 1 | (Philippines) | Bong Ravena | 6 ft 1 in (1.85 m) | | | UE |
| C | 4 | (Philippines) | Julian Tomacruz | 6 ft 6 in (1.98 m) | | | UST |
| G | 5 | (Philippines) | Franz Pumaren | 5 ft 9 in (1.75 m) | | | De La Salle |
| G | 6 | (Philippines) | Ato Agustin | 5 ft 11 in (1.80 m) | | | Lyceum |
| F | 9 | (Philippines) | Samboy Lim | 6 ft 0 in (1.83 m) | | | Letran |
| F | 10 | (Philippines) | Alvin Teng | 6 ft 4 in (1.93 m) | | | Arellano |
| G | 11 | (Philippines) | Biboy Ravanes | 6 ft 0 in (1.83 m) | | | Cebu |
| F | 12 | (Philippines) | Yves Dignadice | 6 ft 4 in (1.93 m) | | | STI WNU |
| G | 14 | (Philippines) | Hector Calma | 5 ft 9 in (1.75 m) | | | Adamson |
| F | 17 | (Philippines) | Jeffrey Graves | 6 ft 3 in (1.91 m) | | | Angeles |
| F | 18 | (Philippines) | Art Dela Cruz | 6 ft 2 in (1.88 m) | | | San Sebastian |
| F/C | 19 | (Philippines) | Ramon Fernandez | 6 ft 4 in (1.93 m) | | | San Carlos |
| F | 29 | (Philippines) | Josel Angeles | 6 ft 3 in (1.91 m) | | | Lyceum |

Coaches
Head coach
- (United States) Norman Black
Assistant(s)

Legend
- (DP) Unsigned draft pick
- (FA) Free agent
- (S) Suspended
- Injured

Purefoods TJ Hotdogs roster
Players

| Pos. | # | POB | Name | Height | Weight | DOB (YYYY–MM–DD) | From |
|---|---|---|---|---|---|---|---|
| F | 4 | (Philippines) | Elmer Reyes | 6 ft 1 in (1.85 m) | | | San Beda |
| G | 6 | (Philippines) | Joey Guanio | 6 ft 1 in (1.85 m) | | | UP Diliman |
| G | 9 | (Philippines) | Boy Cabahug | 5 ft 11 in (1.80 m) | | | Visayas |
| G | 10 | (Philippines) | Dindo Pumaren | 5 ft 9 in (1.75 m) | | | De La Salle |
| C | 11 | (Philippines) | Hernani Demigillo | 6 ft 5 in (1.96 m) | | | San Sebastian |
| G | 12 | (Philippines) | Glenn Capacio | 6 ft 1 in (1.85 m) | | | Far Eastern |
| C | 14 | (Philippines) | Kevin Ramas | 6 ft 5 in (1.96 m) | | | Mapúa |
| F | 15 | (Philippines) | Joey Santamaria | 6 ft 3 in (1.91 m) | | | De La Salle |
| F | 16 | (Philippines) | Alvin Patrimonio | 6 ft 3 in (1.91 m) | | | Mapúa |
| G | 17 | (Philippines) | Leoncio Tan | 6 ft 0 in (1.83 m) | | | De La Salle |
| G | 24 | (Philippines) | Rudy Enterina | 6 ft 0 in (1.83 m) | | | Visayas |
| C | 44 | (Philippines) | Jerry Codinera | 6 ft 5 in (1.96 m) | | | UE |

Coaches
Head coach
- (Philippines) Domingo Panganiban
Assistant(s)

Legend
- (DP) Unsigned draft pick
- (FA) Free agent
- (S) Suspended
- Injured

== Broadcast notes ==
| Game | Play-by-play | Analyst |
|---|---|---|
| Game 1 | Sev Sarmenta | Andy Jao |
| Game 2 | Ed Picson | Quinito Henson |
| Game 3 | Ed Picson | Andy Jao |
| Game 4 | Sev Sarmenta | Bill Velasco |
| Game 5 | Ed Picson | Andy Jao |
| Game 6 | Sev Sarmenta | Quinito Henson |
| Game 7 | Sev Sarmenta | Andy Jao |
