= Jolly Escobar =

Filipino former basketball player and analyst

Personal information
- Born: June 1, 1969 (age 57)
- Listed height: 6 ft 5 in (1.96 m)
- Listed weight: 200 lb (91 kg)

Career information
- High school: San Beda (Manila)
- College: UE
- PBA draft: 1992: 1st round, 6th overall pick
- Drafted by: Shell Rimula X
- Playing career: 1992–2002
- Position: Power forward / Center
- Number: 32, 34

Career history

Playing
- 1992–1998: Formula Shell Zoom Masters
- 1999: Barangay Ginebra Kings
- 2001–2002: Purefoods TJ Hotdogs

Coaching
- 2016–2018: Rain or Shine Elasto Painters (assistant)

Career highlights
- As player: 3× PBA champion (1992 First, 1998 Governors, 2002 Governors)

Joselito "Jolly" Escobar (born June 1, 1969) is a Filipino former basketball player and coach who served as a game analyst on PBA on One Sports and PBA D-League coverages.

== Career ==
Escobar played with the San Beda Red Lions in high school and UE Red Warriors in college. He also played in 1991 Manila SEA Games team. He was selected by the Formula Shell in the draft, played with them until 1998, where he was a teammate to superstar Benjie Paras. He played also for Ginebra and Purefoods.

He also served as an assistant coach in the Rain or Shine Elasto Painters.
