= Yeng Guiao =

Filipino basketball coach and politician (born 1959)

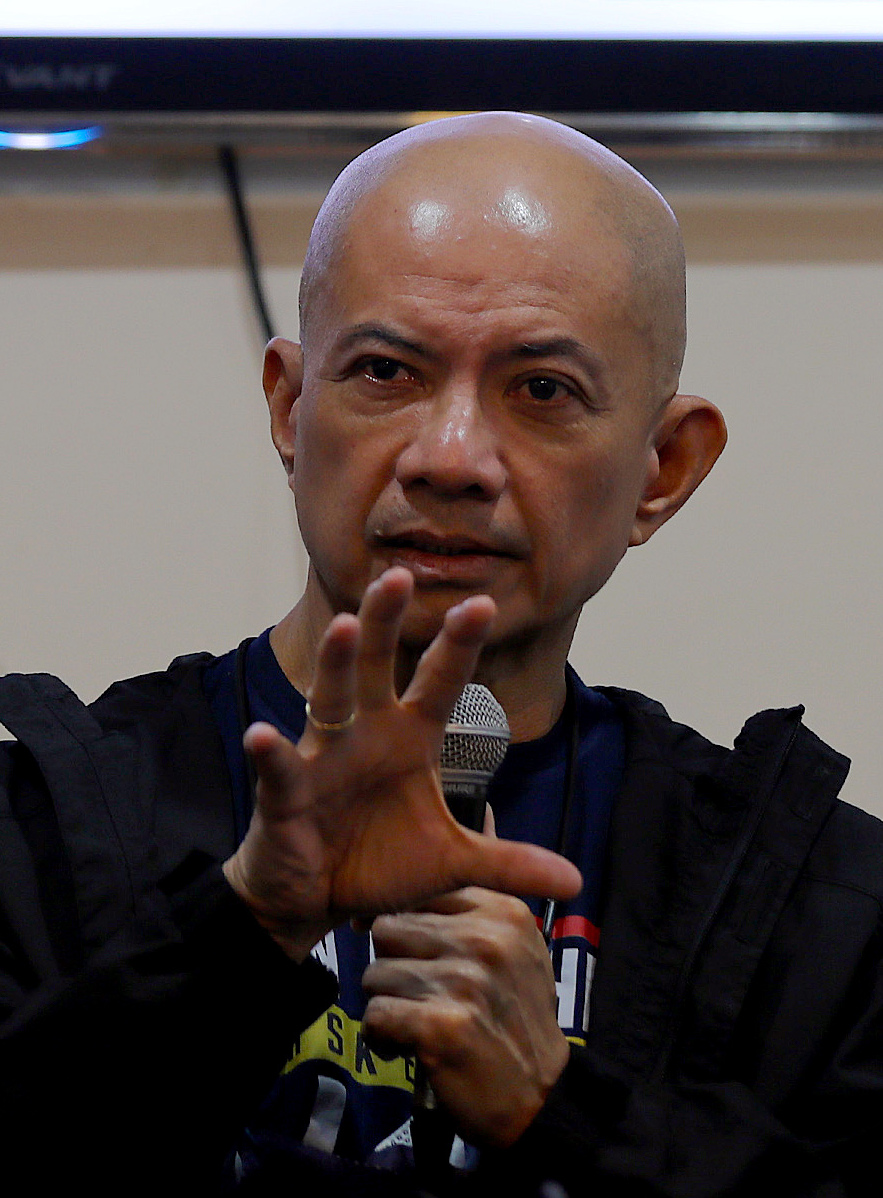
- Guiao in 2023

Member of the House of Representatives from Pampanga's 1st district
- In office June 30, 2013 – June 30, 2016
- Preceded by: Carmelo Lazatin Sr.
- Succeeded by: Carmelo Lazatin II

Vice Governor of Pampanga
- In office June 30, 2004 – June 30, 2013
- Governor: Mark Lapid (2004–2007); Eddie Panlilio (2007–2010); Lilia Pineda (2010–2013)
- Preceded by: Mikey Arroyo
- Succeeded by: Dennis Pineda

Member of the Pampanga Provincial Board from the 1st district
- In office June 30, 2001 – June 30, 2004 Serving with Crisostomo Garbo

Personal details
- Born: March 19, 1959 (age 67) Magalang, Pampanga, Philippines
- Party: Kambilan (2012–present)
- Other political affiliations: Liberal (2001–2004; 2015–2018); NUP (2011–2015); Lakas (2004–2011); KAMPI (2007–2008)
- Spouse: Jennifer Tablante
- Children: 3
- Education: La Salle Green Hills; University of the Philippines Diliman (BS)
- Occupation: Basketball coach, Politician, Civil servant
- Profession: Sports commentator
- Basketball career

Rain or Shine Elasto Painters
- Position: Head coach
- League: PBA

Career information
- College: UP
- Coaching career: 1990–present

Career history

Coaching
- 1990–1994: Swift Mighty Meaty Hotdogs
- 1994–1996: Mobiline Cellulars
- 2000–2009: Red Bull Barako
- 2008–2009: Philippines
- 2009–2011: Air21 Express
- 2011–2016: Rain or Shine Elasto Painters
- 2016–2022: NLEX Road Warriors
- 2018–2019: Philippines
- 2022–present: Rain or Shine Elasto Painters

Career highlights
- 7× PBA champion (1992 Third Conference, 1993 Commissioner's, 2001 Commissioner's, 2002 Commissioner's, 2006 Fiesta, 2012 Governors', 2016 Commissioner's); PBL champion (1989 Freedom Cup); 2× PBA Coach of the Year (2001, 2012); 6× PBA All-Star Game head coach (1991, 2003, 2009, 2016, 2018, 2023)

Joseller "Yeng" Medina Guiao (born March 19, 1959) is a Filipino professional basketball head coach, politician, commentator and sports commissioner. He is currently the head coach of the Rain or Shine Elasto Painters of the Philippine Basketball Association (PBA). He previously served as the interim head coach of the Philippine national team. Guiao won seven PBA titles since starting his head coaching job for Swift in the early 1990s. He is a former Philippine Basketball League commissioner from 1997 to 2000. He was also the Vice Governor of the province of Pampanga from 2004 to 2013, serving three different Governors, Mark Lapid, Eddie Panlilio and Lilia Pineda. He is a former congressman, representing the 1st District of Pampanga from 2013 to 2016.

== Early life ==
Guiao is the son of former Pampanga Governor, the late Bren Z. Guiao. He was an alumnus of La Salle Green Hills, where he ran track in high school. Guiao studied industrial engineering at the University of the Philippines Diliman, where he was a member of the Senior Men's Varsity Basketball team. He entered the coaching ranks in the 1980s.

== Coaching career ==
=== First coaching stint ===
Prior to his PBA coaching career, Guiao was the head coach of the Swift franchise in the Philippine Amateur Basketball League with Alvin Patrimonio as one of its top stars. The RFM franchise entered the PBA in 1990, as Pop Cola, joining market rival Pepsi. Guiao was the team's first head coach and led the renamed Diet Sarsi to its first finals appearance, losing to Purefoods Tender Juicy Hotdog in the 1991 All-Filipino Finals.

In the 1992 Third Conference, he led Swift to their first championship with a 4–0 sweep of 7-Up in the championship. It was also Guiao's first championship in the PBA. He would also led the Mighty Meaties squad to two finals appearances in 1993 and 1994, losing to San Miguel and Alaska.

In 1995, Guiao and then-Pepsi mentor Derrick Pumaren were involved in rare coach for coach trade. While Pumaren led the rechristened Sunkist Orange Juicers to two championships that year, Guiao had two forgettable seasons with Pepsi and then-renamed as Mobiline before leaving his coaching position in 1996.

=== Red Bull ===
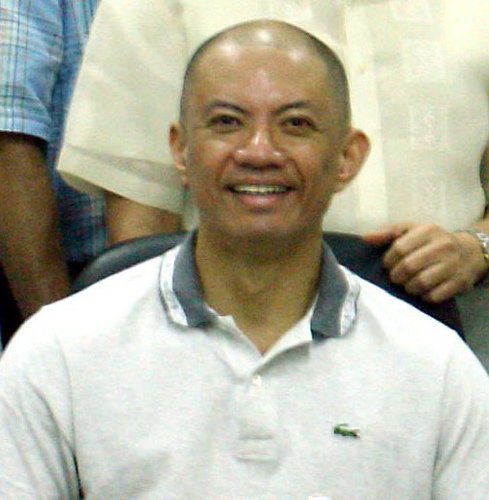
Guiao in 2008.

In 2000, Guiao made his PBA coaching return for the Batang Red Bull Energizers. Despite poor performances in the All-Filipino and Commissioner's Cup, he coached the Thunder to a third-place finish in the 2000 Governors' Cup.

In 2001, he would lead Red Bull to its first PBA title by defeating San Miguel 4–2 in the Commissioner's Cup finals with Antonio Lang as import. The series was marred by physical play between both teams and also Guiao's famous "San Miguel has never beat us with a complete lineup" line, during the series. It was a reference to the PBA suspending Kerby Raymundo and Junthy Valenzuela in Games 3 and 4, respectively as the Beermen won both games.

Guiao would later repeat the same feat in 2002 Commissioner's Cup, leading Red Bull to a seven-game series victory over Talk 'N Text to defend its championship won a year ago.

Red Bull had a two-season title drought, despite several respectable finishes during those seasons. But in the 2005-06 PBA season, he coached the Bulls to the 2005-06 Fiesta Conference Championship, defeating Purefoods in six games and a runner-up finish in the 2006 Philippine Cup, losing to the same Purefoods team, 4–2.

In the 2006-07 Philippine Cup, Guiao led the Bulls to its ninth semifinals appearance in franchise history but lost to San Miguel in seven games. The series saw physical confrontation between teams, even Guiao was ejected in Game 6 for elbowing Dondon Hontiveros and getting involved in a verbal exchange with SMB assistant coach Pido Jarencio.

The Barakos, with a depleted line-up, snatched a slot in semi-finals after it swept powerhouse team Magnolia Beverage Masters 2–0 in best of three quarterfinals of the 2007-2008 Philippine Cup.

In 2008, Guiao resigned as Barako Bull head coach.

=== Burger King / Air21 ===
In 2009, he was signed by the Burger King Whoppers as the new head coach of the team.

=== Rain or Shine ===
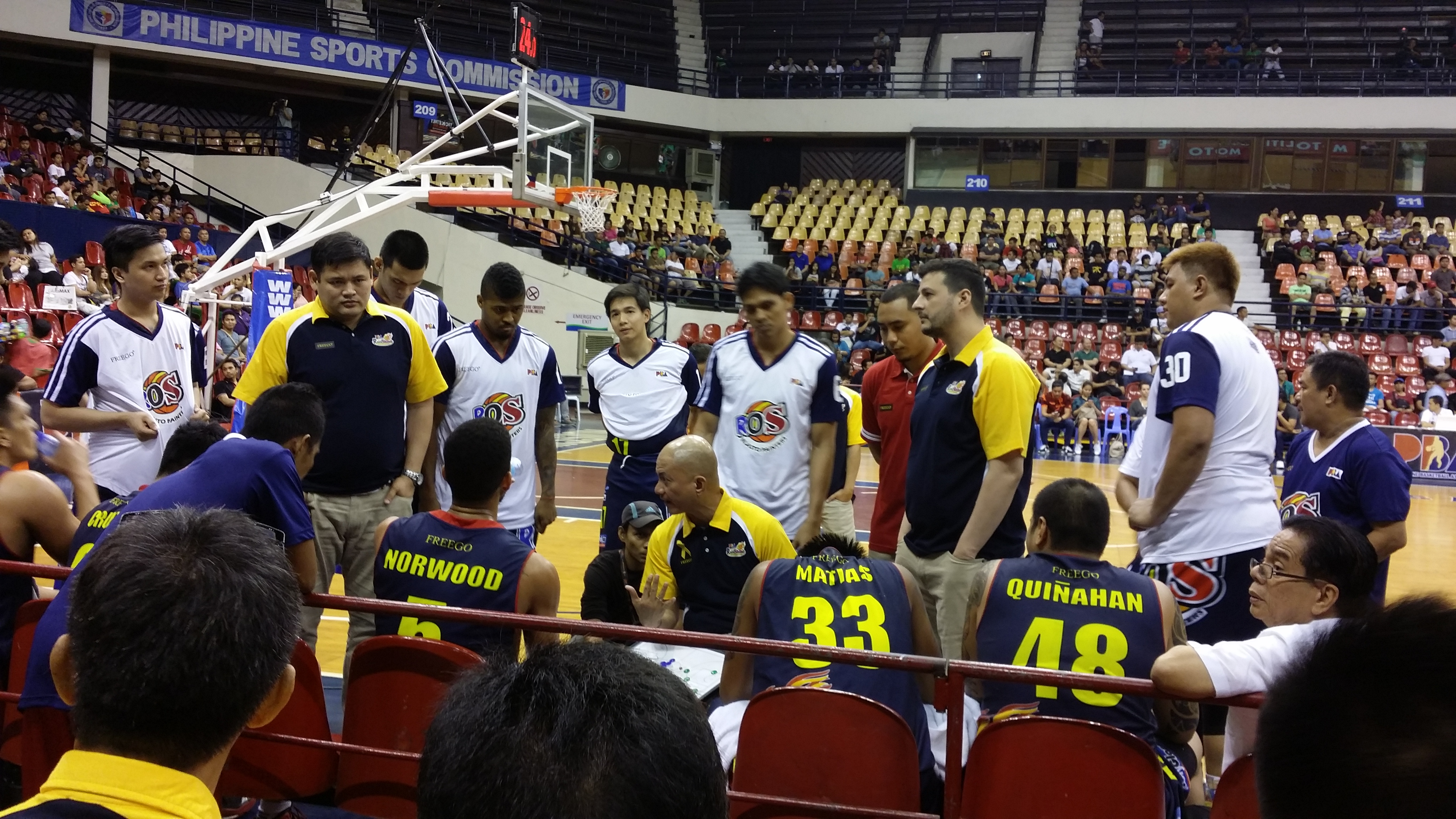
Yeng Guiao and the Elasto Painters during a timeout.

After his contract expired on December 31, 2010, he signed with the Rain or Shine Elasto Painters to become their head coach. As the coach of the Elasto Painters, he helped the team first by making them appear in the Semi-Finals for the first time in Franchise history in the 2010-2011 Governor's Cup.

==== 2011–12 season ====
The 2011-2012 Philippine Cup, the Elasto Painters, with prize rookie Paul Lee and the resurgence of Jeff Chan and Gabe Norwood showed their improvement by making it to the semifinals once again and were one game away from its first PBA Finals appearance before falling to Powerade in seven games. After a forgetful Commissioner's Cup, the Elasto Painters bounced back in the Governors' Cup and topped the elimination round. The team went on to face San Mig Coffee Mixers (then known as the B-Meg Llamados), with Paul Lee out of the series Yeng and the Elasto Painter found ways to beat the Llamados, the Elasto Painters went up 3–1 before the Llamados won 2 straight games to force Game 7. The Elasto Painters won Game 7 and also won their first PBA Title.

==== 2012–13 season ====
Guiao once again led the Rain or Shine Elasto Painters to its 2nd straight (2nd overall) finals appearance once again, but lost to the Talk N Text Tropang Texters in a 4-game sweep.

==== 2013–14 season ====
Guiao again led the Rain or Shine Elasto Painters to the finals for the 3rd time (3rd overall), but lost to the San Mig Super Coffee Mixers in 6 games of the Philippine Cup and then again in the Governors Cup for the 4th time in the final game of the series against the same team.

==== 2014–15 season ====
Guiao would lead Rain or Shine Elasto Painters to the finals of Commissioner's Cup for the 5th time, but once again lost in the final game of the series against the Talk N Text Tropang Texters.

==== 2015–16 season ====
Guiao once again lead the Rain or Shine Elasto Painters to the finals for the 6th time, this time winning the Commissioners' Cup against the Alaska Aces in 6 games, their 2nd championship in franchise history.

=== NLEX ===
Guiao left the Rain or Shine Elasto Painters to join the NLEX Road Warriors in October 2016.

After a six-year stint with two semi-finals appearances, Guiao left the NLEX Road Warriors to return to the Rain Or Shine Elasto Painters in September 2022.

=== Return to Rain or Shine ===
In September 2022, Guiao returned to the Rain or Shine Elasto Painters for his second stint as the team's head coach.

==== List of PBA championships ====
7× PBA champion, 15× Finals Appearances:

- Swift franchise (2)
  - 1992 Third Conference
  - 1993 Commissioner's
- Red Bull franchise (3)
  - 2001 Commissioner's
  - 2002 Commissioner's
  - 2005–06 Fiesta
- Rain or Shine franchise (2)
  - 2012 Governors'
  - 2016 Commissioner's

=== National team ===
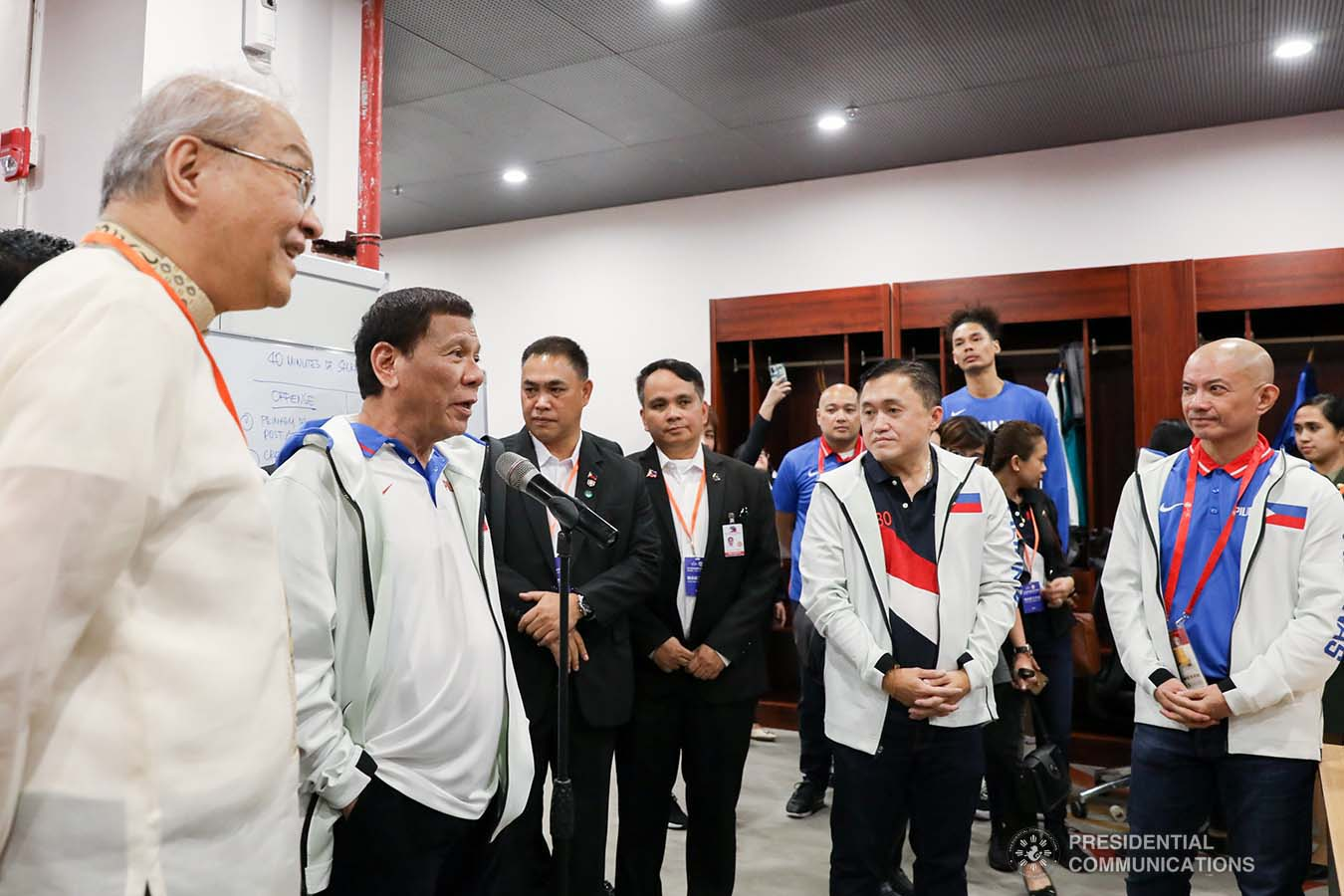
Yeng Guiao (third from right) in 2019

On September 25, 2008, he was named the head coach of the Philippines men's national basketball team and tasked with selecting, forming, and training the national squad, with the ultimate goal of competing in the 2010 World Basketball Championship (FIBA World Championship) in Istanbul, Turkey. Guiao was the successor of Chot Reyes, the current head coach of the Talk 'N Text Tropang Texters. Guiao became the sixth coach to head a PBA-backed national squad after Robert Jaworski Sr. (1990), Norman Black (1994), Tim Cone (1998), Jong Uichico (2002), and Reyes, who had a 9th-place finish in 2007 FIBA-Asia Men's Basketball Championship in Tokushima, Japan. After a failed bid, he was then succeeded by Rajko Toroman as the national coach.

Guiao returned as head coach of the Philippines, after Chot Reyes along with several Filipino players was suspended by FIBA for their involvement in the Philippines-Australia basketball brawl of the 2019 FIBA Basketball World Cup Asian qualifiers. Despite the suspension, Guiao managed to secure the Philippines' qualification in the 2019 FIBA World Cup.

The Philippines however did not win one of its five games in the 2019 FIBA World Cup under Guiao. After the campaign Guiao announced his resignation as head coach of the team on September 11, 2019.

== Philippine Basketball League Commissioner ==
In 1997, Guiao became the new commissioner of the Philippine Basketball League, replacing Charlie Favis. His first move was to put the league's game from the Rizal Memorial Coliseum to the newly built Makati Coliseum. He also helped the league gained marginal success from 1997 to 1999, with teams such as the Tanduay Rhum Masters winning titles and Blu Detergent signing-up Asi Taulava.

In 1999, he put the PBL coverage for one-season on Vintage Sports, the same network covering PBA games back then. The year saw significant exposure for the league while Welcoat Paints established themselves as the league's new dynasty.

== Commentator ==
Around the time he was the PBL commissioner, he also joined Vintage Sports as their regular color commentator from 1997 to 1999. From 1998 to 1999, Guiao formed a popular tandem with Chino Trinidad, mostly delivering humor to the broadcasting booth. Trinidad and Guiao called Barangay Ginebra's upset of the Mobiline Phone Pals in 1999 All-Filipino Cup quarterfinals for Vintage Sports.

Guiao would leave the commentary booth, as well as the Commissioner post in 2000 to join Red Bull's move to the pro ranks. Coincidentally, the PBL board chose Trinidad as his successor.

== Political career ==
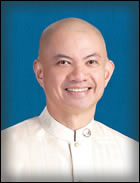
Official portrait as a member of the House of Representatives. 16th Congress.

In 2001, Guiao became a board member in the province of Pampanga, after serving in numerous local positions in his home town. Guiao had plans to have Pampanga host several sports for the 2005 Southeast Asian Games but was later scrapped. In 2004, he won the Vice Governor position of the province.

Guiao, the son of former Pampanga Governor Bren Guiao, had been critical about the leadership of former Pampanga Governor Mark Lapid, who was his former ally, so he switched sides and aligned himself to Lilia Pineda, wife of the alleged gambling lord Bong Pineda. In 2005, he asked Philippine President Gloria Macapagal Arroyo to investigate Gov. Lapid and his father Senator Lito Lapid of plunder charges.

He ran for re-election as Vice Governor and won as a running mate of Senior Provincial Board Member Lilia Pineda, the wife of alleged-Jueteng lord Bong Pineda, under the KAMPI banner (KAMPI is the mother party of Arroyo).

He ran for congressman of the First District of Pampanga in 2013. He won his position against former Rep. Francis Nepomuceno. In 2016, Guiao, as PHCYSD vice chair, 1st district 16th Congress filed a mandamus to nullify the Ramos-era Pagcor memorandum. In August 2024, Supreme Court Justice Marvic Leonen granted the petition, directing the Pagcor to remit 5% of its gross income per year to PSC from 1993. The PCSO was ordered to account and refund to the PSC, 30% charity fund from the six lottery draws annually, starting 2006. He is also the principal author of the Samboy Lim Law, Republic Act 10871, or "The Basic Life Support Training in Schools Act". The said bill was filed in 2015, providing basic life support training or CPR in high school in public and private schools. He ran again for his second term in the 2016 elections against Jon Lazatin, son of former Angeles mayor and 1st district congressman Carmelo Lazatin Sr. However, Guiao lost his re-election bid in the May 9 elections, after he only got 44,672 votes over his opponent Jon Lazatin, with 78,197 of the total counted votes.

== See also ==
- Pop Cola Panthers
- Philippine Basketball League

Offices and distinctions
Sporting positions
Preceded by Turo Valenzona (PBL)	Pop Cola/Swift head coach 1990–1994	Succeeded by Derrick Pumaren
Preceded by Derrick Pumaren	Pepsi Mega Hotshots/Mobiline Cellulars head coach 1995–1996	Succeeded by Norman Black
Preceded by Charlie Favis	Philippine Basketball League Commissioner; 1997–1999	Succeeded by Chino Trinidad
Preceded by Gil Lumberio (PBL)	Red Bull Barako head coach 2000–2009	Succeeded by Leo Isaac
Preceded by Bo Perasol	Air21 Express head coach 2009–2011	Succeeded by Junel Baculi
Preceded by Caloy Garcia	Rain or Shine head coach 2011–2016	Succeeded by Caloy Garcia
Political offices
Preceded by Mikey Arroyo	Vice Governor of Pampanga; 2004–2013	Succeeded by Dennis Pineda
House of Representatives of the Philippines
Preceded by Carmelo Lazatin Sr.	Member of the Philippine House of Representatives from Pampanga's 1st district 2013–2016	Succeeded by Carmelo Lazatin II
