= Rick Calloway =

American basketball player

Personal information
- Born: October 12, 1966 (age 60) Cincinnati, Ohio, U.S.
- Listed height: 6 ft 6 in (1.98 m)
- Listed weight: 180 lb (82 kg)

Career information
- High school: Withrow (Cincinnati, Ohio)
- College: Indiana (1985–1988); Kansas (1989–1990)
- NBA draft: 1990: undrafted
- Playing career: 1990–1997
- Position: Shooting guard
- Number: 4

Career history
- 1990–1991: Sacramento Kings
- 1991-1992: Columbus Horizon
- 1992: Rochester Renegade
- 1992: San Miguel Beermen
- 1993-1994: Chorale Roanne Basket
- 1996-1997: Omaha Racers

Career highlights
- NCAA champion (1987); Second-team Parade All-American (1985); McDonald's All-American (1985)
- Stats at NBA.com
- Stats at Basketball Reference

Richard Marlon Calloway (born October 12, 1966) is an American former professional basketball player. He played one season in the National Basketball Association (NBA) for the Sacramento Kings during the 1990–91 season. Born in Cincinnati, Ohio, he attended Indiana University and transferred to the University of Kansas in 1988. Calloway was a 6'6" 180 lb forward.

Calloway was selected in the 1990 CBA Draft by the Omaha Racers, and played for the Columbus Horizon and Rochester Renegade in that league. He also played professionally in the Philippines, France, Argentina,Poland, and Israel.

Calloway is now a partner in swimming pool construction company, Beyond Blue Pools, in the Houston area.
