= 1992 San Miguel Beermen season =

- Head coach: Norman Black
- Owner: San Miguel Corporation

First Conference results
- Record: 13–12 (52%)
- Place: 2nd
- Playoff finish: Runner-up

All-Filipino Conference results
- Record: 18–7 (72%)
- Place: 1st
- Playoff finish: Champions

Third Conference results
- Record: 12–12 (50%)
- Place: 4th
- Playoff finish: Semifinals

San Miguel Beermen seasons

The 1992 San Miguel Beermen season was the 18th season of the franchise in the Philippine Basketball Association (PBA).

== Draft picks ==
Round	Pick	Player	College
1	5	Bong Ravena	UE
2	13	Julian Rabbi Tomacruz	UST

== Return to the finals ==
The San Miguel Beermen welcomes the return of the "Skywalker" Samboy Lim in the lineup. The Beermen were tied with Shell and Presto on top of the standings in the First Conference with seven wins and four losses. Their import Derrick Chievous played in all of their 11 games in the eliminations. But at the start of the semifinal round, the San Miguel coaching staff decided to replace Chievous after a spat with some of his teammates. Coming in was Rick Calloway.

San Miguel beat Alaska Milkmen in a playoff game to finally enter the finals for the first time since winning the grand slam in 1989. Going up against Shell Rimula-X Turbo Chargers in the championship series, the Beermen were the underdogs with Shell having Bobby Parks, who won his unprecedented seventh best import award, providing the big difference against his counterpart. The Beermen lost in the title series in five games.

== Championship ==
In the All-Filipino Conference, the Beermen finish second in the eliminations and a game behind defending champion Purefoods Tender Juicy Hotdogs, which top the standings with eight wins and two losses. During the semifinal round, the Beermen won their first six outings for a magic number 13 wins and gain one of the two finals berth as their winning streak reach to eight games.

Going into the last day of the semifinal round, the Beermen played the 7-Up Bottlers with both teams losing only once in the semifinals, the third-year ballclub 7-Up are close to their first finals stint and the Beermen can afford to lose and choose the Bottlers as their opponent instead of the more experience Purefoods squad looking for their fifth straight All-Filipino finals appearance, but San Miguel went on to beat 7-Up, leaving the Bottlers in a playoff game with Purefoods, which the Hotdogs won.

In a classic All-Filipino championship showdown between the Beermen and the Hotdogs, the San Miguel Beermen won in a hard-fought seven-game series for their first crown in three years and their ninth overall title.

== Notable dates ==
July 28: Ato Agustin scored a night-high 42 points as San Miguel seize solo leadership in the semifinals of the All-Filipino Conference with their 10th victory in 13 games, a 118–106 win over Purefoods, which now lost two straight games and dropped to 10 wins and four losses.

July 30: San Miguel swept the first round of the semifinals, winning against 7-Up, 103–97 in overtime. Both teams won their first three outings in the semifinals and the Uncolas were riding high on a four-game winning streak before their match.

October 11: Kenny Travis scored 52 points as San Miguel beat defending champion Alaska, 118–115, for only their second win in six games into the Third Conference.

November 8: The Beermen unleashed two key breakaways in the third period to hand Shell a 115–102 loss as San Miguel booked one of the last two semifinal berths in a knockout game.

== Awards ==
- Renato Agustin won the Most Valuable Player (MVP) award.
- MVP Winner Renato Agustin and Ramon Fernandez were named to the Mythical five selection.
- Ferdinand Ravena was voted the season's Rookie of the year.

== Roster ==
1992 San Miguel Beermen roster
Players

Pos.	#	POB	Name	Height	Weight	DOB (YYYY–MM–DD)	From
G/F	1	(Philippines)	Bong Ravena	6 ft 1 in (1.85 m)			UE
C	4	(Philippines)	Julian Tomacruz	6 ft 6 in (1.98 m)			UST
G	5	(Philippines)	Franz Pumaren	5 ft 9 in (1.75 m)			De La Salle
G	6	(Philippines)	Ato Agustin	5 ft 11 in (1.80 m)			Lyceum
F	9	(Philippines)	Samboy Lim	6 ft 0 in (1.83 m)			Letran
F/C	10	(Philippines)	Alvin Teng	6 ft 4 in (1.93 m)			Arellano
G/F	11	(Philippines)	Biboy Ravanes	6 ft 0 in (1.83 m)			Cebu
F/C	12	(Philippines)	Yves Dignadice	6 ft 4 in (1.93 m)			STI WNU
G	14	(Philippines)	Hector Calma	5 ft 9 in (1.75 m)			Adamson
G/F	16	(Philippines)	Romeo Lopez	6 ft 1 in (1.85 m)			Angeles
F	17	(Philippines)	Jeffrey Graves	6 ft 3 in (1.91 m)			Angeles
F	18	(Philippines)	Art Dela Cruz	6 ft 2 in (1.88 m)			San Sebastian
C	19	(Philippines)	Ramon Fernandez	6 ft 4 in (1.93 m)			San Carlos
F	29	(Philippines)	Josel Angeles	6 ft 3 in (1.91 m)			Lyceum

Coaches
Head coach
- (United States) Norman Black
Assistant(s)
- (Philippines) Filomeno Pumaren

Legend
- (DP) Unsigned draft pick
- (FA) Free agent
- (S) Suspended
- Injured

== Transactions ==
=== Trades ===
Off-season	To Alaska Bobby Jose	To San Miguel Beermen Biboy Ravanes

=== Recruited imports ===
Name	Conference	No.	Pos.	Ht.	College	Duration
Derrick Chievous	First Conference	7	Forward	6"4'	University of Missouri	February 11 to March 24
Rick Calloway	First Conference	20	Forward-Center	6"4'	Kansas State	April 2 to May 5
Jay Taylor	Third Conference	24	Guard-Forward	6"1'	Eastern Illinois	September 22 to October 4
Kenny Travis	Third Conference	21	Guard-Forward	6"1'	New Mexico State	October 8 to December 10
