= 1992 Presto Ice Cream season =

1992 Presto Ice Cream Kings season
- Head coach: Jimmy Mariano; Tommy Manotoc
- Owner: CFC Corporation

First Conference results
- Record: 8–11 (42.1%)
- Place: 5th
- Playoff finish: Semifinals

All-Filipino Conference results
- Record: 2–8 (20%)
- Place: 7th
- Playoff finish: N/A

Third Conference results
- Record: 1–10 (9.1%)
- Place: 8th
- Playoff finish: N/A

Presto Ice Cream Kings seasons

The 1992 Presto Ice Cream Kings season was the 18th and final season of the franchise in the Philippine Basketball Association (PBA).

== Draft picks ==
Round	Pick	Player	College
1	1	Vergel Meneses	JRU
2	9	Joseph Valdez	Adamson
3	17	Albert David	Letran

== Notable dates ==
February 9: In the opening game of the league's 18th season, Presto Ice Cream won over Swift Mighty Meaty Hotdogs, 120-118. Allan Caidic hit seven triples and topscored for 43 points while rookie Vergel Meneses, with the crowd screaming and chanting the top overall pick, banked in 21 points.

March 1: Allan Caidic topscored with 33 points as he joined hands with import Derwin Collins to lead Presto to a come-from-behind 110-104 win over Purefoods for solo leadership in the First Conference.

March 8: Import Derwin Collins, retain by the Presto management despite the arrival of the taller Kenny Redfield, led the Ice Cream Kings to their sixth win in seven games by scoring the last six points in a 114-109 victory over San Miguel.

October 4: New Import Joey Wright, who replaces Jerome Harmon after three games, debut with 52 points and led Presto to their first win in the conference, a 139-135 overtime victory over San Miguel.

== Occurrences ==
The impressive performance of import Derwin "Tank" Collins put Presto on top of the standings in the First Conference with six wins and one loss and while the team keeps on winning, management and coaching staff were in dilemma whether to replace Collins with the waiting Kenny Redfield. With the vote of confidence by his teammates and coach, Collins keeps his job and Redfield went to Pepsi instead.

Coach Jimmy Mariano filed his resignation as early as Presto's last two matches in the All-Filipino Conference and his departure was apparently due to the team's lackluster performance in the last three conferences despite lofty billings and the rumored rift with Presto top honcho Ignacio Gotao after the Ice Cream Kings lost a won-game against Purefoods in their June 28 outing.

Beginning the Third Conference, former grandslam coach Tommy Manotoc succeeded Jimmy Mariano at the Presto bench.

The Ice Cream Kings acquired the services of Jerome Harmon as their import in the Third Conference. The Global Basketball Association slam dunk champion was highly advertised and there were protest by other teams that he was above the height limit of 6'2", Harmon was re-measured and met the ceiling at 6'1 7/8.

Harmon’s replacement Joey Wright got injured in their game against Shell which they lost, 108-118 on October 11. He was replaced by Eldridge Recasner in their next match.

== Last PBA game ==
Rumors were already widespread that the team, one of the only two remaining pioneer ballclub in the PBA, was headed for disbandment. On November 5, Presto Ice Cream Kings bid farewell and played its last PBA game without an import, Allan Caidic topscored with 37 points in a 113-129 loss to 7-Up.

== Roster ==
Presto Ice Cream roster
Players
Coaches

Pos.	No.	Nat.	Name	Ht.	Wt.
F	4	(Philippines)	Vergel Meneses	6 ft 2 in (1.88 m)		José Rizal
G/F	5	(Philippines)	Peter Jao	6 ft 0 in (1.83 m)		USJ–R
F/C	6	(Philippines)	Abe King	6 ft 3 in (1.91 m)		San Beda
F	8	(Philippines)	Allan Caidic	6 ft 2 in (1.88 m)		UE
G	9	(Philippines)	Onchie Dela Cruz	5 ft 10 in (1.78 m)		Philippine Christian
F	11	(Philippines)	Arnie Tuadles	6 ft 2 in (1.88 m)		Visayas
F/C	12	(Philippines)	Cadel Mosqueda	6 ft 3 in (1.91 m)		Arellano
G	14	(Philippines)	Gerry Esplana	5 ft 10 in (1.78 m)		Far Eastern
F	15	(Philippines)	Albert David	6 ft 4 in (1.93 m)		Letran
F	16	(Philippines)	Bong Hawkins	6 ft 3 in (1.91 m)		UPHSD
F	17	(Philippines)	Padim Israel	6 ft 3 in (1.91 m)		Ateneo
C	21	(Philippines)	Joseph Valdez	6 ft 5 in (1.96 m)		Adamson
C	28	(Philippines)	Zaldy Realubit	6 ft 5 in (1.96 m)		USJ–R
F	32 & 33	(Philippines)	Harmon Codiñera	6 ft 4 in (1.93 m)		Far Eastern

Head coach

- (Philippines) Tommy Manotoc

Assistant coach(es)

- (Philippines) Nat Canson
- (Philippines) Bong Go

Team manager

- (Philippines) Ignacio Gotao

Legend

- (C) Team captain
- Injured

== Transactions ==
=== Additions ===
Player	Signed	Former team
Harmon Codiñera	June 1992	Purefoods

=== Recruited imports ===
Name	Conference	No.	Pos.	Ht.	College	Duration
Derwin Collins	First Conference	3	Guard-Forward	6"3'	University of New Orleans	February 9 to April 21
Jerome Harmon	Third Conference	32	Guard-Forward	6"2'	University of Louisville	September 20-29
Joey Wright	Third Conference	5	Guard-Forward	6"2'	University of Texas	October 4-13
Eldridge Recasner	Third Conference	7	Guard-Forward	6"2'	University of Washington	October 18-29
