= 1992 PBA season =

18th PBA season

- Duration: February 9, 1992 – December 13, 1992
- Teams: 8
- TV partner: Vintage Sports (PTV)

1992 PBA Draft
- Top draft pick: Vergel Meneses
- Picked by: Presto Ice Cream
- Season MVP: Ato Agustin (San Miguel Beermen)
- First Conference champions: Shell Rimula X Zoomers
- First Conference runners-up: San Miguel Beermen
- All-Filipino Cup champions: San Miguel Beermen
- All-Filipino Cup runners-up: Purefoods TJ Hotdogs
- Third Conference champions: Swift Mighty Meaty Hotdogs
- Third Conference runners-up: 7-Up Uncolas

Seasons
- ← 1991 1993 →

The 1992 PBA season was the 18th season of the Philippine Basketball Association (PBA).

== Executive committee ==
- Reynaldo G. Marquez (Commissioner)
- Luis Lorenzo, Sr. (Chairman, representing Pepsi Hotshots)
- Wilfred Steven Uytengsu (Vice Chairman, representing Alaska Milkmen)
- Lance Gokongwei (Treasurer, representing Presto Tivolis)

== Teams ==
Team	Company	Governor
Alaska Milkmen	General Milling Corporation	Wilfred Steven Uytengsu
Ginebra San Miguel	La Tondeña Distillers, Inc.	Bernabe Navarro
Pepsi Hotshots	Pepsi-Cola Products Philippines, Inc.	Luis Lorenzo, Sr.
Presto Tivolis	Consolidated Foods Corporation	Lance Gokongwei
Purefoods Hotdogs	Purefoods Corporation	Renato Buhain
San Miguel Beermen	San Miguel Corporation	Nazario Avendaño
Shell Rimula X	Pilipinas Shell Petroleum Corporation	Ric Lara
Swift Mighty Meaty Hotdogs	Republic Flour Mills Corporation	Elmer Yanga

== Season highlights ==
- PBA Commissioner Rudy Salud stepped down from his post to become the campaign manager of Danding Cojuangco for the upcoming presidential elections. League chairman Rey Marquez succeeded Atty. Salud as the new PBA Commissioner.
- The pre-season annual PBA draft was highly anticipated with six members of the national team that took home the basketball gold in the recent Southeast Asian Games joining the rookie draft. Five-time national player Zandro "Jun" Limpot appealed earlier to PBA commissioner Rudy Salud that he'l be allowed to enter the PBA draft despite a league rule prohibited a player younger than 23 years old to play in the league. The PBA board of governors has rejected Jun Limpot's request.
- Purefoods Tender Juicy Hotdogs won the four-team PBA battle of champions from January 26 – February 2, which includes the Chinese national team. The other two teams that participated are last year's third conference champion Alaska Milkmen and Swift Mighty Meaty Hotdogs, taking the spot from last year's first conference champion Ginebra San Miguel.
- League mourns the passing of the great sportscaster Joe Cantada, who succumbed to cancer in the United States on March 22.
- The PBA's playing venue, the ULTRA was renamed NASA, now controlled by the Philippine Sports Commission (PSC). By the end of the year, the league left the Pasig Arena after eight years. The PBA transferred to the newly built Cuneta Astrodome in Pasay the following season.
- The PBA suffered in gate attendance with lean crowds watching the games during the All-Filipino, among several factors were the absence of crowd-drawer Ginebra San Miguel from the semifinals and the deteriorating venue. The league introduced the Whiplash dancers during halftime to entertain the fans watching live.
- The league's first NBA-styled coliseum announcer, Vince St. Price, made his debut during the All-Filipino Conference finals. He became the regular venue announcer for the league's second game during doubleheaders.
- Swift Mighty Meaties found an import named Tony Harris, known as the "Hurricane", Harris broke all sorts of record for the most points scored in a single game by scoring 105 points in Swift's 151-147 win against Ginebra on October 10, 1992, in Iloilo City. He was easily the unanimous choice for the best import award and led Swift Mighty Meaties to their first-ever PBA championship. Swift coach Yeng Guiao won his first title as a head mentor.
- Presto Ice Cream, one of the two remaining pioneers in the PBA, played its final season. The Gokongwei franchise had earlier signed former grandslam coach and the comebacking Tommy Manotoc to replace coach Jimmy Mariano on the bench before the start of the third conference. The team won just once in their final conference and formally bid goodbye and played their last game on November 5, losing to 7-Up. The ballclub was sold to Sta.Lucia Realty just before Christmas Eve in December 1992.

== Opening ceremonies ==
The muses for the participating teams are as follows:

Team	Muse
Alaska Milkmen	Amelia Dela Cruz
Ginebra San Miguel	Rea Ordonez and Andrea Bautista
Pepsi Hotshots	Pops Fernandez with Martin Nievera
Presto Ice Cream	Selina Manalad
Purefoods Tender Juicy Hotdogs	Bettina Barrientos
San Miguel Beermen	Ruffa Gutierrez
Shell Rimula X Zoomers	Ina Remedios and Liza Arevalo
Swift Mighty Meaty Hotdogs	Kris Aquino

== Champions ==
- First Conference: Shell Rimula-X Zoomers
- All-Filipino Conference: San Miguel Beermen
- Third Conference: Swift Mighty Meaty Hotdogs
- Team with best win–loss percentage: Swift Mighty Meaty Hotdogs (43-26, .623)
- Best Team of the Year: San Miguel Beermen (3rd)

== First Conference ==
=== Elimination round ===
Pos	Team	W	L	PCT	GB	Qualification
1	Presto Ice Cream	7	4	.636	—	Semifinal round
2	Shell Rimula X Zoomers	7	4	.636	—	Semifinal round
3	San Miguel Beermen	7	4	.636	—	Semifinal round
4	Alaska Milkmen	6	5	.545	1	Semifinal round
5	Swift Mighty Meaty Hotdogs	5	6	.455 (Note: Semifinal berth playoff: Swift 123–117 Purefoods)	2	Semifinal round
6	Purefoods Tender Juicy Hotdogs	5	6	.455	2	
7	Pepsi Hotshots	4	7	.364	3	
8	Ginebra San Miguel	3	8	.273	4	

=== Semifinal round ===
Overall standings
Pos	Team	W	L	PCT	GB	Qualification
1	Shell Rimula X Zoomers	13	6	.684	—	Advance to the finals (Note: If a team outside the top two teams wins at least five semifinal round games, then it and the second-placed team will playoff for the last finals berth; otherwise, the top 2 teams qualify outright.)
2	San Miguel Beermen	11	8	.579 (Note: Head-to-head record: San Miguel 2–2 Alaska, San Miguel +11)	2	Guaranteed finals berth playoff
3	Alaska Milkmen	11	8	.579	2	Qualify to finals berth playoff
4	Swift Mighty Meaty Hotdogs	9	10	.474	4	Proceed to third place playoffs
5	Presto Ice Cream	8	11	.421	5	

Notes:

Semifinal round standings
Pos	Team	W	L	Qualification
1	Shell Rimula X Zoomers	6	2	
2	Alaska Milkmen	5	3	Qualify to finals berth playoff (Note: Shell advanced to the finals outright as #1 seeded team; finals berth playoff: San Miguel 118–97 Alaska)
3	San Miguel Beermen	4	4	
4	Swift Mighty Meaty Hotdogs	4	4	
5	Presto Ice Cream	1	7	

=== Third place playoffs ===
Team 1	Series	Team 2	Game 1	Game 2	Game 3	Game 4	Game 5
(3) Alaska Milkmen	3–2	(4) Swift Mighty Meaty Hotdogs	111–108	127–132	121–130	W–L	115–107

=== Finals ===
Team 1	Series	Team 2	Game 1	Game 2	Game 3	Game 4	Game 5	Game 6	Game 7
(1) Shell Rimula X Zoomers	4–1	(2) San Miguel Beermen	112–105 (OT)	98–89	93–115	104–98	102–92	—	—

- Best Import of the Conference: Bobby Parks (Shell)

== All-Filipino Conference ==
=== Elimination round ===
Pos	Team	W	L	PCT	GB	Qualification
1	Purefoods Tender Juicy Hotdogs	8	2	.800	—	Semifinal round
2	Swift Mighty Meaty Hotdogs	7	3	.700	1	Semifinal round
3	San Miguel Beermen	7	3	.700	1	Semifinal round
4	7-Up Uncolas	6	4	.600	2	Semifinal round
5	Shell Rimula X Zoomers	5	5	.500	3	Semifinal round
6	Ginebra San Miguel	3	7	.300	5	
7	Alaska Milkmen	2	8	.200	6	
8	Presto Ice Cream	2	8	.200	6	

=== Semifinal round ===
Overall standings
Pos	Team	W	L	PCT	GB	Qualification
1	San Miguel Beermen	14	4	.778	—	Advance to the finals (Note: If a team outside the top two teams wins at least five semifinal round games, then it and the second-placed team will playoff for the last finals berth; otherwise, the top 2 teams qualify outright.)
2	Purefoods Tender Juicy Hotdogs	12	6	.667	2	Guaranteed finals berth playoff
3	7-Up Uncolas	12	6	.667	2	Qualify to finals berth playoff
4	Swift Mighty Meaty Hotdogs	10	8	.556	4	Proceed to third place playoffs
5	Shell Rimula X Zoomers	5	13	.278	9	

Notes:

Semifinal round standings
Pos	Team	W	L	Qualification
1	San Miguel Beermen	7	1	
2	7-Up Uncolas	6	2	Qualify to finals berth playoff (Note: San Miguel advanced to the finals outright as #1 seeded team; finals berth playoff: Purefoods 81–77 7-Up)
3	Purefoods Tender Juicy Hotdogs	4	4	
4	Swift Mighty Meaty Hotdogs	3	5	
5	Shell Rimula X Zoomers	0	8	

=== Third place playoffs ===
Team 1	Series	Team 2	Game 1	Game 2	Game 3	Game 4	Game 5
(3) 7-Up Uncolas	0–3	(4) Swift Mighty Meaty Hotdogs	88–96	98–103	94–106	—	—

=== Finals ===
Team 1	Series	Team 2	Game 1	Game 2	Game 3	Game 4	Game 5	Game 6	Game 7
(1) San Miguel Beermen	4–3	(2) Purefoods Tender Juicy Hotdogs	85–77	94–100	111–112	114–102	99–98	99–107	105–86

== Third Conference ==
=== Elimination round ===
Pos	Team	W	L	PCT	GB	Qualification
1	Swift Mighty Meaty Hotdogs	9	2	.818	—	Semifinal round
2	7-Up Uncolas	7	4	.636	2	Semifinal round
3	Ginebra San Miguel	7	4	.636	2	Semifinal round
4	San Miguel Beermen	5	6	.455 (Note: Head-to-head quotient: Purefoods 1.013, Shell 1.007, San Miguel 0.996, Alaska 0.983; semifinal round berth playoffs: Purefoods 119–110 Alaska, San Miguel 115-102 Shell)	4	Semifinal round
5	Purefoods Tender Juicy Hotdogs	5	6	.455	4	Semifinal round
6	Alaska Milkmen	5	6	.455	4	
7	Shell Rimula X Zoomers	5	6	.455	4	
8	Presto Ice Cream Kings	1	10	.091	8	

=== Semifinal round ===
Overall standings
Pos	Team	W	L	PCT	GB	Qualification
1	Swift Mighty Meaty Hotdogs	14	5	.737	—	Advance to the Finals (Note: If a team outside the top two teams wins at least five semifinal round games, then it and the second-placed team will playoff for the last Finals berth; otherwise, the top 2 teams qualify outright.)
2	7-Up Uncolas	12	7	.632	2	Guaranteed Finals berth playoff
3	San Miguel Beermen	11	8	.579	3	Qualify to Finals berth playoff
4	Ginebra San Miguel	10	9	.526	4	Proceed to third place playoffs
5	Purefoods Tender Juicy Hotdogs	6	13	.316	8	

Notes:

Semifinal round standings
Pos	Team	W	L	Qualification
1	San Miguel Beermen	6	2	Qualify to Finals berth playoff (Note: Swift advanced to the Finals outright as #1 seeded team, 7-Up guaranteed playoff as #2 seeded team; Finals berth playoff: 7-Up 102–91 San Miguel)
2	Swift Mighty Meaty Hotdogs	5	3	
3	7-Up Uncolas	5	3	
4	Ginebra San Miguel	3	5	
5	Purefoods Tender Juicy Hotdogs	1	7	

=== Third place playoffs ===
Team 1	Series	Team 2	Game 1	Game 2	Game 3	Game 4	Game 5
(3) San Miguel Beermen	0–3	(4) Ginebra San Miguel	124–130	99–114	93–107	—	—

=== Finals ===
Team 1	Series	Team 2	Game 1	Game 2	Game 3	Game 4	Game 5	Game 6	Game 7
(1) Swift Mighty Meaty Hotdogs	4–0	(2) 7-Up Uncolas	121–109	101–97	125–107	119–106	—	—	—

- Best Import of the Conference: Tony Harris (Swift)

== Awards ==
- Most Valuable Player: Ato Agustin (San Miguel)
- Rookie of the Year: Bong Ravena (San Miguel)
- Most Improved Player: Pido Jarencio (Ginebra)
- Mythical Five:
  - Al Solis (Swift)
  - Ato Agustin (San Miguel)
  - Ramon Fernandez (San Miguel)
  - Alvin Patrimonio (Purefoods)
  - Nelson Asaytono (Swift)
- Mythical Second Team:
  - Ronnie Magsanoc (Shell)
  - Elmer Cabahug (Purefoods)
  - Benjie Paras (Shell)
  - Jerry Codiñera (Purefoods)
  - Alvin Teng (San Miguel)
- All-Defensive Team:
  - Jerry Codiñera (Purefoods)
  - Glenn Capacio (Purefoods)
  - Alvin Teng (San Miguel)
  - Art dela Cruz (San Miguel)
  - Chito Loyzaga (Ginebra)

== Cumulative standings ==
Pos	Team	Pld	W	L	PCT	Best finish
1	San Miguel Beermen	73	43	30	.589	Finalist
2	Swift Mighty Meaty Hotdogs	69	40	29	.580	Champions
3	Pepsi Hotshots/7-Up Uncolas	56	31	25	.554	Finalist
4	Shell Rimula X Zoomers	54	27	27	.500	Champions
5	Purefoods Tender Juicy Hotdogs	58	28	30	.483	Champions
6	Alaska Milkmen	47	21	26	.447	Third place
7	Ginebra San Miguel	43	19	24	.442	Third place
8	Presto Ice Cream/Ice Cream Kings	40	11	29	.275	Semifinalist

=== Elimination round ===
Pos	Team	Pld	W	L	PCT
1	Swift Mighty Meaty Hotdogs	32	21	11	.656
2	San Miguel Beermen	32	19	13	.594
3	Purefoods Tender Juicy Hotdogs	32	18	14	.563
4	Pepsi Hotshots/7-Up Uncolas	32	17	15	.531
5	Shell Rimula X Zoomers	32	17	15	.531
6	Alaska Milkmen	32	13	19	.406
7	Ginebra San Miguel	32	13	19	.406
8	Presto Ice Cream/Ice Cream Kings	32	10	22	.313

=== Playoffs ===
Pos	Team	Pld	W	L
1	San Miguel Beermen	41	24	17
2	Swift Mighty Meaty Hotdogs	37	19	18
3	Pepsi Hotshots/7-Up Uncolas	24	14	10
4	Shell Rimula X Zoomers	22	10	12
5	Purefoods Tender Juicy Hotdogs	26	10	16
6	Alaska Milkmen	15	8	7
7	Ginebra San Miguel	11	6	5
8	Presto Ice Cream/Ice Cream Kings	8	1	7
