= Tony Harris (basketball, born 1967) =

American basketball player

Personal information
- Born: May 13, 1967 (age 59) Monroe, Louisiana, U.S.
- Listed height: 6 ft 3 in (1.91 m)
- Listed weight: 190 lb (86 kg)

Career information
- High school: Theodore Roosevelt (East Chicago, Indiana)
- College: Lamar (1985–1986); Johnson County CC (1987–1988); New Orleans (1988–1990)
- NBA draft: 1990: undrafted
- Playing career: 1990–2002
- Position: Shooting guard
- Number: 3, 43

Career history
- 1990–1991: Quad City Thunder
- 1991: Philadelphia 76ers
- 1991–1992: Quad City Thunder
- 1992: Grand Rapids Hoops
- 1992–1993: Swift Mighty Meaties
- 1993: La Crosse Catbirds
- 1993–1994: Oklahoma City Cavalry
- 1994–1995: Boston Celtics
- 1995: Sioux Falls Skyforce
- 1995: Cocodrilos de Caracas
- 1995–1996: APOEL
- 1996–1997: Sioux Falls Skyforce
- 1997: Cáceres CB
- 1997–1998: Papagou
- 1998: Pop Cola 800s
- 1998: Sioux Falls Skyforce
- 1999: APOEL
- 1999: San Diego Stingrays
- 2001–2002: Gary Steelheads

Career highlights
- All-CBA First Team (1997); PBA champion (1992 Third); PBA Best Import (1992 Third); American South Player of the Year (1990); 2× First-team All-American South (1989, 1990)
- Stats at NBA.com
- Stats at Basketball Reference

Tony Dwayne Harris (born May 13, 1967) is an American former professional basketball player. After spending high school at Roosevelt in East Chicago, he later went to University of New Orleans.

== Professional career ==
Harris debuted in the NBA in February 1991 for the Philadelphia 76ers in the 1990–91 season, averaging 1.7 points on 25.0% field goal shooting and 50.0% free throw shooting in 6.8 minutes a game in 6 contests.

In 1994, Tony Harris played for the Boston Celtics for two seasons. In March 1994, he had his best season with averages of 8.8 points, 2.0 rebounds, 1.6 assists and 1.2 turnovers on 17.6 minutes in 5 games. He finished his NBA career with an average of 4.9 points on 10.5 minutes in fourteen contests.

Tony Harris scored 105 points in a game on October 10, 1992, in the Philippine Basketball Association, against Ginebra in a game that was played in Iloilo City. To this day his record still stands. Fans gave him the moniker "Hurricane" in the Philippine Basketball Association.

Harris played in the Continental Basketball Association (CBA) for the Quad City Thunder, Grand Rapids Hoops, La Crosse Catbirds, Oklahoma City Cavalry, Sioux Falls Skyforce and Gary Steelheads from 1990 to 2002. He was selected to the All-CBA First Team in 1997.

== NBA career statistics ==
Legend
| GP | Games played | GS | Games started | MPG | Minutes per game |
| FG% | Field goal percentage | 3P% | 3-point field goal percentage | FT% | Free throw percentage |
| RPG | Rebounds per game | APG | Assists per game | SPG | Steals per game |
| BPG | Blocks per game | PPG | Points per game | **Bold** | Career high |

=== Regular season ===
| Year | Team | GP | GS | MPG | FG% | 3P% | FT% | RPG | APG | SPG | BPG | PPG |
|---|---|---|---|---|---|---|---|---|---|---|---|---|
| 1990–91 | Philadelphia | **6** | 0 | 6.8 | .250 | .000 | .500 | .2 | .0 | .2 | .0 | 1.7 |
| 1993–94 | Boston | 5 | 0 | **17.6** | .290 | **.333** | **.920** | **2.0** | .0 | **.8** | .0 | **8.8** |
| 1994–95 | Boston | 3 | 0 | 6.0 | **.375** | .000 | .889 | .0 | .0 | .0 | .0 | 4.7 |
| Career | | 14 | 0 | 10.5 | .291 | .250 | .868 | .8 | .6 | .4 | .0 | 4.9 |
