= 1992 7-Up Uncolas season =

- Head coach: Derrick Pumaren
- General manager: Steve Watson
- Owner: Pepsi Philippines

First Conference results
- Record: 4–7 (36.4%)
- Place: 7th
- Playoff finish: Eliminated

All-Filipino Conference results
- Record: 12–10 (54.5%)
- Place: 4th
- Playoff finish: Semifinals

Third Conference results
- Record: 13–11 (54.2%)
- Place: 2nd
- Playoff finish: Finals

7-Up Uncolas seasons

The 1992 7-Up Uncolas season was the 3rd season of the franchise in the Philippine Basketball Association (PBA). Known as Pepsi Hotshots in the First Conference.

== Draft picks ==
Round	Pick	Player	College
2	10	Roberto Jabar	SWU

== Notable dates ==
March 7: Kenny Redfield, who was originally a replacement import for Presto's Derwin Collins, debuted with 39 points and 24 rebounds that gave the Bottlers a 110-105 win over Ginebra San Miguel in the out-of-town game in Lucena City. It was the first win in seven games for the Bottlers with Redfield replacing Mark Stevenson after Pepsi lost their first six outings in the First Conference.

July 14: Seven-Up ripped Alaska Milk, 95-77, for their sixth win in 10 games in the All-Filipino Conference as the Bottlers makes it to the semifinal round for only the second time in their franchise history.

July 26: The Bottlers ended the seven-game winning streak of league-leading Purefoods TJ Hotdogs in a 112-99 victory and improved their standings to eight wins and four losses.

July 28: Seven-Up turned back Swift Mighty Meaties, 108-99, for their third straight win in the semifinals of the All-Filipino Conference and moved within reach of a possible first-ever finals appearance.

August 9: Eugene Quilban made an all-time record 28 assists in Seven-Up's 123-100 win over Shell.

December 3: Seven-Up reached the finals for the first time in three years of participation, defeating San Miguel Beermen, 102-91, for the right to play Swift Mighty Meaties for the Third Conference title.

== Occurrences ==
On December 1, which was the last scheduled semifinal double-header of the Third Conference, 7-Up won over Swift in a high-scoring contest, 156-154. The Bottlers' victory ousted crowd-favorite Ginebra San Miguel from the finals race. Had Swift, which already clinch the first finals seat, won in that first game, a Ginebra victory over San Miguel Beermen in the second game would have assured the Ginebras a playoff for one of the two finals berth. PBA Commissioner Rey Marquez fined both the Mighty Meaties and Bottlers P100,000 for their players' unusual conduct in that game.

== First finals stint ==
In the Third Conference, 7-Up's original choice for their import Melvin Newbern played three games and led his team to one victory. Newbern put in numbers of 51, 70 and 59 points for an average of 60 points per game and despite that, players voted in favor of a replacement and coming in is Delano Demps.

The Bottlers made it to the championship round for the first time in their franchise history and will go up against the Swift Mighty Meaties after winning over San Miguel Beermen in their playoff game on December 3. Seven-Up got swept in four games by a much stronger Swift squad led by their super import Tony Harris and became the second team to lose in the finals series via four-game sweep.

== Roster ==
1992 7-Up Uncolas roster
Players

Pos.	#	POB	Name	Height	Weight	DOB (YYYY–MM–DD)	From
C	1	(Philippines)	Manny Victorino	6 ft 5 in (1.96 m)			José Rizal
G/F	2 & 22	(Philippines)	Alejo Alolor	6 ft 1 in (1.85 m)			Visayas
C	4	(Philippines)	Peter Aguilar	6 ft 5 in (1.96 m)			TUA
G	7	(Philippines)	Eugene Quilban	5 ft 7 in (1.70 m)			San Sebastian
G/F	9	(Philippines)	Naning Valenciano	6 ft 2 in (1.88 m)			USLS
F	10	(Philippines)	Roberto Jabar	6 ft 0 in (1.83 m)			Southwestern-U
G	11	(Philippines)	Mark Anthony Tallo	5 ft 6 in (1.68 m)			Southwestern-U
G	13	(Philippines)	Leo Austria	5 ft 11 in (1.80 m)			Lyceum
C	25	(Philippines)	Gido Babilonia	6 ft 6 in (1.98 m)			UST
F	29	(Philippines)	Bernardo Carpio	6 ft 3 in (1.91 m)			Ateneo
C	32	(Philippines)	Abet Guidaben	6 ft 5 in (1.96 m)			USJ–R
F	50	(Philippines)	Nap Hatton	6 ft 1 in (1.85 m)			San Sebastian

Coaches

Head coach

- (Philippines) Derrick Pumaren

Assistant coach(es)

- (Philippines) Gabby Velasco

Legend

- (C) Team captain
- Injured

== Transactions ==
=== Trades ===
Off season	To Alaska Gilbert Reyes	To Pepsi Eugene Quilban
Off-season	To Shell Leo Isaac	To Pepsi Leo Austria

=== Additions ===
Player	Signed	Former team
Peter Aguilar	Off-season	Alaska
Nap Hatton	Off-season	Alaska
Gido Babilonia	Off-season	Shell

=== Recruited imports ===
Name	Conference	No.	Pos.	Ht.	College	Duration
Mark Stevenson	First Conference	24	Forward	6"5'		February 11 to March 1
Kenny Redfield	First Conference	35	Forward	6"5'	Michigan State	March 7-22
Melvin Newbern	Third Conference	20	Guard-Forward	6"3'	University of Minnesota	September 22-29
Dell Demps	Third Conference	5	Guard-Forward	6"3'	University of the Pacific	October 6 to December 13
