= 1992 Ginebra San Miguel season =

- Head coach: Robert Jaworski
- General Manager: Bernabe Navarro
- Owner(s): La Tondeña Distillers, Inc.

First Conference results
- Record: 3–8 (27.3%)
- Place: 8th
- Playoff finish: N/A

All-Filipino Conference results
- Record: 3–7 (30%)
- Place: 6th
- Playoff finish: N/A

Third Conference results
- Record: 13–9 (59.1%)
- Place: 3rd
- Playoff finish: Semifinals

Ginebra San Miguel seasons

The 1992 Ginebra San Miguel season was the 14th season of the franchise in the Philippine Basketball Association (PBA).

== Draft pick ==
Round	Pick	Player	College
1	8	Emilio Chuatico	Ateneo de Manila

== Occurrences ==
In the PBA-China pre-season battle of champions in January featuring the Chinese national team and the three PBA teams that won a title last year, Ginebra San Miguel decided to withdraw from the four-day invitational meet when they send home their import Roy Marble, who fails to impress the coaching staff in their pre-season exhibition game. Swift Mighty Meaty, which posted the fourth-best win–loss record last year, takes the place of Ginebra.

On February 18 in the early grudge match between the two rivals which played for the first conference championship in the past two seasons and were part of player transfers during the off-season where former Ginebra cagers are now with Shell, the Gins beat the Turbo Chargers, 125-117. The game was so intense that had new Ginebra recruit Pido Jarencio and ex-Gin Rey Cuenco being thrown out of the game after almost a fistfight when Jarencio reacted on a punch thrown by Cuenco on fellow new Ginebra cager Sonny Cabatu, who was also given a karate chop by ex-Gin Leo Isaac. Earlier in the ballgame, it was playing coach Sonny Jaworski and rookie Mulong Orillosa who were involved in an argument.

Ginebra import Jervis Cole was suspended for one game for figuring in exchange of blows with Presto guard Onchie Dela Cruz in their game on February 27. The Gins played the San Miguel Beermen in their next outing on March 3 without the suspended Cole and they lost the match.

Former Best Import winner Jamie Waller return to play for Ginebra in the Third Conference. The Gins were allowed to have an import standing 6-4 as the handicapping rule for being eliminated twice while the rest of the teams will have a 6-1 import. Eight games into the eliminations with Ginebra carrying a four-win, four-loss record when trouble started brewing regarding import Jamie Waller's actions, but rumors were quickly dispelled when Waller led Ginebra to the semifinals with back-to-back wins over Alaska and Shell. When Shell import Kelvin Upshaw was kick out and banned by the PBA for failing a drug test, Waller went on his way and left to sympathise with Upshaw. Ginebra decided to bring in a replacement import Danny Jones, going into their highly anticipated encounter with the Tony Harris-led Swift.

== Notable dates ==
March 15: Ginebra San Miguel overpowered their arch rivals Shell Rimula-X, 122-108, to stay alive in the battle for the last three semifinal berths of the first conference and snapped out of a five-game losing slump.

October 6: Jamie Waller banged in 62 points, including six in overtime, to lead Ginebra to a 140-134 victory over Purefoods. The Gins are now tied with idle Alaska at second place with their third straight win after losing their first game while the Hotdogs dropped to two wins and two defeats.

October 25: Chito Loyzaga scored his only two points in the game with 10 seconds left to lift Ginebra to a 118-115 triumph over Alaska as the Gins moved within a win of achieving their first semifinal stint in the 1992 season.

October 27: Ginebra makes it to the semifinals of the third conference with a 112-101 victory over Shell, whose import Kelvin Upshaw was thrown out of the game halfway through the last quarter. The Gins translate Upshaw's exit into a seven-point blitz that installed them ahead at 100-94.

November 3: New import Danny Jones debut with 59 points as Ginebra nip Swift, 146-145, to secure a solid position in second place going into the semifinal round. A last-second bankshot by Tony Harris, who scored 76 points, rolled in but was seemingly tipped out of the hoop, sending the pro-Ginebra crowd in wild frenzy as the Gins handed the Mighty Meaties only their second loss in 11 games.

== Roster ==
1992 Ginebra San Miguel roster
Players

Pos.	#	POB	Name	Height	Weight	DOB (YYYY–MM–DD)	From
C	5	(Philippines)	Sonny Cabatu	6 ft 5 in (1.96 m)			PSBA
F	6 & 54	(Philippines)	Dondon Ampalayo	6 ft 3 in (1.91 m)			USJ–R
G	7	(Philippines)	Robert Jaworski	6 ft 1 in (1.85 m)			UE
G/F	8	(Philippines)	Silverio Palad	6 ft 2 in (1.88 m)			UST
F	9	(Philippines)	Macky De Joya	6 ft 3 in (1.91 m)			San Beda
C	10	(Philippines)	Anthony Poblador	6 ft 6 in (1.98 m)			De La Salle
G/F	11	(Philippines)	Jayvee Gayoso	6 ft 0 in (1.83 m)			Ateneo
F	12	(Philippines)	Dante Gonzalgo	6 ft 1 in (1.85 m)			Lyceum
F	14	(Philippines)	Larry Villanil	6 ft 1 in (1.85 m)			Visayas
C	15	(Philippines)	Tonichi Yturri	6 ft 5 in (1.96 m)			De La Salle
G	17	(Philippines)	Emilio Chuatico	6 ft 0 in (1.83 m)			Ateneo
G	25	(Philippines)	Pido Jarencio	5 ft 9 in (1.75 m)			UST
G/F	41	(Philippines)	Chito Loyzaga	6 ft 2 in (1.88 m)			San Beda

Coaches

Head coach

- (Philippines) Robert Jaworski

Assistant coach(es)

- (Philippines) Arlene Rodriguez
- (Philippines) Philip Cezar

Team manager

- (Philippines) Bernabe Navarro

Legend

- (C) Team captain
- Injured

== Transactions ==
=== Trades ===
Off season	To Swift Rudy Distrito	To Ginebra Pido Jarencio
Off-season	To Swift Rey Cuenco	To Ginebra Sonny Cabatu
Off-season	To Pepsi Leo Isaac	To Ginebra Tonichi Yturri

=== Rookie free agent ===
Player	Signed	Former team
MacDonald De Joya	Off-season	N/A

=== Recruited imports ===
Name	Conference	No.	Pos.	Ht.	College	Duration
Jervis Cole	First Conference	32	Forward	6"5'	Fresno State University	February 11 to March 24
Jamie Waller	Third Conference	32	Forward	6”4’	Virginia Union University	September 20 to October 27
Danny Jones	Third Conference	34	Forward	6"4'	University of Wisconsin	November 3 to December 10
