= 1992 Purefoods Tender Juicy Hotdogs season =

- Head coach: Ely Capacio (until First Conference); Domingo Panganiban
- General manager: Domingo Panganiban
- Owner: Purefoods Corporation

First Conference results
- Record: 5–7 (41.7%)
- Place: 6th
- Playoff finish: Eliminated

All-Filipino Conference results
- Record: 16–10 (61.5%)
- Place: 2nd
- Playoff finish: Finals

Third Conference results
- Record: 7–13 (35%)
- Place: 5th
- Playoff finish: Semifinals

Purefoods Tender Juicy Hotdogs seasons

The 1992 Purefoods Tender Juicy Hotdogs season was the 5th season of the franchise in the Philippine Basketball Association (PBA).

== Draft picks ==
Round	Pick	Player	College
1	4	Kevin Ramas	Mapua
2	12	Joey Guanio	UP Diliman

== Notable dates ==
March 10: Purefoods carved out a 157–118 win over Ginebra San Miguel in a much-needed victory as the Hotdogs were battling for the last three semifinal berths in the First Conference. The 39-point rout was the most humbling loss yet absorbed by Ginebra. Glenn Capacio hit a perfect 6-of-6 from the three-point line and scored 24 points.

July 2: Alvin Patrimonio took charge in the final period and banged in 14 of his 37 points to spoil a big night of former Hotdog Nelson Asaytono, who had been unstoppable with a career-high 48 points as the Tender Juicy Hotdogs scored a 110–106 triumph over Swift Mighty Meaties in the match-up of corporate rivals that played in the All-Filipino finals last season.

July 21: Working behind inspired games from second stringers Joey Santamaria and Elmer Reyes, the Hotdogs came roaring back from 15 points down and repeated with a 108–104 win over Swift Mighty Meaties at the start of the semifinal round in the All-Filipino Conference. The victory was Purefoods' sixth straight win.

July 23: Purefoods coasted to a 113–105 win over Shell Rimula-X and racked up their seventh win in a row that bolstered their record to 10 wins and two losses in the All-Filipino Conference semifinals.

== Occurrences ==
After Purefoods were eliminated in the First Conference, Coach Ely Capacio resigned and was replaced by team manager Domingo Panganiban, who will act as head coach for the Hotdogs beginning the All-Filipino Conference.

== Finals stint ==
The Purefoods Tender Juicy Hotdogs got a stroke of luck when the first finalist for the All-Filipino Conference championship, the San Miguel Beermen, choose to beat 7-Up in their last semifinal game when they could afford to lose and ended the Hotdogs' string of All-Filipino finals appearance. Purefoods went on to defeat 7-Up, 81–77, in the playoff game to advance in the All-Filipino championship series for the fifth straight year.

The defending champions Purefoods Tender Juicy Hotdogs were a slight underdogs against the San Miguel Beermen. They forced a seventh and deciding game before eventually losing the final game of the series.

== Roster ==
1992 Purefoods Tender Juicy Hotdogs roster
Players

Pos.	#	POB	Name	Height	Weight	DOB (YYYY–MM–DD)	From
G/F	4	(Philippines)	Elmer Reyes	6 ft 1 in (1.85 m)			San Beda
G	6	(Philippines)	Joey Guanio	6 ft 1 in (1.85 m)			UP Diliman
G	8	(Philippines)	Arthur Ayson	5 ft 9 in (1.75 m)			Letran
G/F	9	(Philippines)	Boy Cabahug	5 ft 11 in (1.80 m)			Visayas
G	10	(Philippines)	Dindo Pumaren	5 ft 9 in (1.75 m)			De La Salle
C	11	(Philippines)	Hernani Demigillo	6 ft 5 in (1.96 m)			San Sebastian
G/F	12	(Philippines)	Glenn Capacio	6 ft 1 in (1.85 m)			Far Eastern
C	14	(Philippines)	Kevin Ramas	6 ft 5 in (1.96 m)			Mapúa
F	15	(Philippines)	Joey Santamaria	6 ft 3 in (1.91 m)			De La Salle
F	16	(Philippines)	Alvin Patrimonio	6 ft 3 in (1.91 m)			Mapúa
G	17	(Philippines)	Leoncio Tan	6 ft 0 in (1.83 m)			De La Salle
G	24	(Philippines)	Rudy Enterina	6 ft 0 in (1.83 m)			Visayas
C	44	(Philippines)	Jerry Codinera	6 ft 5 in (1.96 m)			UE

Coaches
Head coach
- (Philippines) Domingo Panganiban
Assistant(s)
- (Philippines) Chito Narvasa

Legend
- (DP) Unsigned draft pick
- (FA) Free agent
- (S) Suspended
- Injured

== Transactions ==
=== Additions ===
Player	Signed	Former team
Hernani Demigillo	Off-season	Tivoli Milk
Art Ayson	September 1992	N/A

=== Recruited imports ===
Name	Conference	No.	Pos.	Ht.	College	Duration
Clinton Smith	First Conference	1	Forward	6"5'	Cleveland State	February 9 to March 26
Kurk Lee	Third Conference	20	Guard	6"1'	Towson State	September 22 to November 10
Willie White	Third Conference		Guard-Forward	6"1'	University of Tennessee	November 12–29

== Win–loss record ==
Season Rank	GP	Win	Lost	Pct.
5th Overall	58	28	30	0.483
