= 1992 PBA draft =

Player selection in Philippine basketball

General information
- Date: January 12, 1992
- Time: 6:30 pm
- Location: The ULTRA, Pasig
- Network: Vintage Sports on PTV

Overview
- League: Philippine Basketball Association
- First selection: Vergel Meneses (Presto)

The 1992 Philippine Basketball Association (PBA) rookie draft was an event at which teams drafted players from the amateur ranks. The annual rookie draft was held on January 12, 1992, at The ULTRA.

== Round 1 ==
| Pick | Player | Country of origin* | PBA team | College |
|---|---|---|---|---|
| 1 | Vergel Meneses | Philippines | Presto Ice Cream | Jose Rizal |
| 2 | Stevenson Solomon | Philippines | Alaska Milkmen | San Sebastian |
| 3 | Joselito Escobar | Philippines | Shell Rimula X | East |
| 4 | Fermin Albert Ramas | Philippines | Purefoods Tender Juicy Hotdogs | Mapua |
| 5 | Ferdinand Ravena, Jr. | Philippines | San Miguel Beermen | East |
| 6 | Enrique Reyes | Philippines | Swift Mighty Meaties | Ateneo de Manila |
| 7 | Allen Sasan | Philippines | Alaska Milkmen | Cebu |
| 8 | Emilio Chuatico, Jr. | Philippines | Ginebra San Miguel | Ateneo de Manila |

== Round 2 ==
| Pick | Player | Country of origin* | PBA team | College |
|---|---|---|---|---|
| 9 | Joseph Valdez | Philippines | Presto Ice Cream | Adamson |
| 10 | Roberto Jabar | Philippines | Pepsi Cola | Southwestern |
| 11 | Bonel Balingit | Philippines | Swift Mighty Meaties | Visayas |
| 12 | Joselito Guanio | Philippines | Purefoods Tender Juicy Hotdogs | UP Diliman |
| 13 | Julian Rabbi Tomacruz | Philippines | San Miguel Beermen | Santo Tomas |
| 14 | Romulo Orillosa | Philippines | Shell Rimula X | Adamson |
| 15 | Ronald Cahanding | Philippines | Alaska Milkmen | Adamson |

== Round 3 ==
| Pick | Player | Country of origin* | PBA team | College |
|---|---|---|---|---|
| 16 | Delfin Rizane | Philippines | Swift Mighty Meaties | Southwestern |
| 17 | Al David | Philippines | Presto Ice Cream | Letran |
| 18 | Gil Lumberio | Philippines | Pepsi Cola | Letran |
| 19 | Marcelino Albarillo | Philippines | Purefoods Tender Juicy Hotdogs | Mindanao |

== Round 4 ==
| Pick | Player | Country of origin* | PBA team | College |
|---|---|---|---|---|
| 20 | Arthur Ayson | Philippines | Presto Ice Cream | Letran |
| 21 | Melchor Teves | Philippines | Swift Mighty Meaties | San Sebastian |

== Notes ==
- Alaska, the only team with two options in the first round, acquired the rights on the seventh pick overall by trading Eric Altamirano to Pepsi Cola in 1991.
- The ballclubs have to sign their draftees within five days otherwise the players become free agents.
