= Ginebra–Shell rivalry =

Defunct rivaly in the Philippine Basketball Association

- Teams: Barangay Ginebra Kings; Shell Turbo Chargers

Postseason history
- 1989 All-Filipino Third Place: Shell won, 3–2; 1990 First Conf. Finals: Shell won, 4–2 (Note: Añejo/Ginebra walked out of the game with 2:52 left in the second quarter. The league awarded Shell with a Game 6 title-clinching win by forfeiture.); 1991 First Conf. Finals: Ginebra won, 4–3; 1996 All-Filipino Cup Semifinal Round Robin: Ginebra won, 2–0 (Note: Ginebra won both: 111–104 (OT), 98–86); 1996 Commissioner's Cup Semifinal Round Robin: Ginebra won 2–1 (Note: Ginebra won both: 99–196, 120–103. Bur Shell won the game for Finals slot 89–86); 1997 Commissioner's Cup Semifinal Round Robin: Tie, 1–1 (Note: Shell won first 121–112; Gordon also won 122–109); 1998 Centennial Cup Semifinal: Shell won, 78–75 (OT); 1999 All-Filipino Cup Semifinals: Shell won, 3–0; 2001 All-Filipino Cup Semifinals: Ginebra won, 3–2; 2001 Governors' Cup Quarterfinals: Shell won 1–1 (Note: Shell has twice to beat advantage. Ginebra won first game, 97–75. Shell won, 106–87)

The Ginebra–Shell rivalry is the early 1990s PBA rivalry that followed the San Miguel–Purefoods rivalry and Añejo–Purefoods rivalry and probably the decades' best rivalry before Sunkist and Alaska battled in the PBA championship for three straight conferences in the mid-1990s.

== Finals match-up ==
The two teams played in the PBA championship in the first conference of the 1990 and 1991 season, Shell won their first title and prevailed in six games when Ginebra, then Añejo Rum 65, walked out in the second quarter of Game Six of the 1990 First Conference finals. The following year in the same conference, Ginebra San Miguel exact revenge, coming back from a 1-3 series deficit and won in Game Seven on Rudy Distrito's difficult drive to the basket in the last five seconds of their epic encounter.

== Semifinal series & playoff games ==
The 1996 knockout match between Shell and Ginebra for the right to play Alaska Milk in the finals of the Commissioners Cup remains the most-talked about playoff matches among old-school PBA fans. The Zoom Masters won that game on import Kenny Redfield's three-point shot at the buzzer. Two years before in the 1994 PBA Governor's Cup, Shell knock Ginebra (then known as Tondeña 65) in a playoff for the last semifinals berth.

Ginebra and Shell would renew their rivalry during the semifinal series of the 1999 PBA All-Filipino Cup. The Ginebras, now known as Barangay Ginebra Kings and coming off an upset win over top-seeded Mobiline Phone Pals, lost to Shell in the best-of-five series via 3-0 sweep. The series win by the Zoom Masters, earn the team their first All-Filipino finals appearance since their maiden year in 1985. Significantly, Shell defeated Ginebra in a knockout game that time to make it to the finals.

Two year later in the 2001 PBA All-Filipino Cup, Barangay Ginebra this time won over Shell in the best-of-five semifinal series, three games to two, for their first finals stint since 1997. The Gin Kings' victory enabled Jun Limpot to finally play in his PBA finals after 8 seasons. Likewise Vergel Meneses will be making his first finals trip in five years since his Sunkist Orange Juicers days.

== Brawls & near fights ==
- In the two teams' first meeting in the 1986 Third Conference, Ginebra playing coach Sonny Jaworski got into an exchange of words with Shell forward Rey Lazaro during a play involving Shell import Dexter Shouse. Shell coach Edgardo Ocampo even rushed to the court to confront the Big J until cooler heads intervene.
- In the 1987 Third Conference during their semifinals game, Ginebras' Joey Loyzaga threw a punch on Shell's Rey Lazaro, after he got elbowed in the stomach earlier, brother Chito Loyzaga come into Joey's aid and a fight ensued.
- The battle for third place in the deciding fifth game of the series in the 1989 PBA All-Filipino Conference, emotions run high with only five seconds remaining of the closely fought game when Añejo's Rey Cuenco and Shell's Romy dela Rosa, who were earlier involved in a trade, exchange blows after a heated scramble for possession, resulting in a free-for-all and both benches emptied.
- In 1992 First Conference, the two protagonist of the PBA Open finals during the past two seasons, were pitted early in their third outing. Both teams were part of player transfers during the off-season where three former Ginebra cagers are now playing for Shell. New Ginebra recruit Pido Jarencio and ex-Gin Rey Cuenco were thrown out of the game after almost a fistfight. Ginebra playing coach Sonny Jaworski and Shell rookie Mulong Orillosa were earlier involved in an argument.
- The worst brawl between these two teams took place in Game two of the 1999 PBA All-Filipino Cup semifinal series. Shell's Jay Mendoza was singled out as the instigator of the melee when he elbowed Barangay Ginebra forward Wilmer Ong. A total of P235,000 fines and suspensions were handed out among those involved in the free-for-all.

== Players who played for both teams ==
There are a number of players that don the Ginebra and Shell jersey, including Crispa greats Philip Cezar and Freddie Hubalde, and Toyota stars Arnie Tuadles, Terry Saldaña and Ricky Relosa. Ginebra's top centers during the 1980s, Romulo Mamaril and Ed Ducut, ended their playing careers with Shell. Joey Loyzaga and Leo Isaac would transfer to Shell at some time. Rey Cuenco and Manny Victorino played for Shell before Ginebra acquired the two center-forwards in 1989 and 1993 respectively.

Among the national team members of the 1980s and 1990s, Paul Alvarez, Jolly Escobar and Victor Pablo would play for these two teams. And during the 2000 era, Ronald Tubid and Billy Mamaril

== Other historical significance ==
- Shell's first coach Freddie Webb resigns as head coach after Shell lost to Ginebra in their second semifinal outing in the 1986 First Conference.
- Robert Jaworski's coaches with the famed Toyota Super Corollas, Ed Ocampo and Dante Silverio, would take turns to handle the Shell ballclub in the late 1980s.
- Ginebra assistant coach Rino Salazar would become Shell's head coach beginning the 1991 Third Conference. Shell's erstwhile coach Arlene Rodriguez would sit on the Ginebra bench as assistant coach and replacement for Salazar on that same conference.
- Shell's tower of power Benjie Paras, at one time in the franchise's lowest point during the first four months of the 1993 PBA season, wanted out of Shell and has openly express his desire to transfer to Ginebra.
- Ginebra's last game with playing coach and then-senator Sonny Jaworski under contract with the La Tondeña ballclub before he tendered his resignation in December 1998, was against Shell on November 6.

== See also ==
- Manila Classico
- Barangay Ginebra–Meralco rivalry
