= 1990 PBA First Conference finals =

Team	Coach	Wins
Formula Shell	Arlene Rodriguez	4
Añejo Rum 65	Robert Jaworski	2
- Dates: May 3–15, 1990
- Television: Vintage Sports (PTV)
- Radio network: DZAM

Referees
- Game 6: G. Ledesma, E. de Leon, R. Hines

PBA First Conference finals chronology
- 1991 >

PBA finals chronology
- < 1989 Reinforced 1990 All-Filipino >

The 1990 PBA First Conference finals was the best-of-seven basketball championship series of the 1990 PBA First Conference, and the conclusion of the conference's playoffs. Formula Shell Zoom Masters and Añejo Rum 65ers played for the 45th championship contested by the league.

Formula Shell took home its first PBA title by winning their series against Añejo Rum 65ers, four games to two. Game Six resulted in a tumultuous ending as the 65ers walked off of the playing court with 2:52 left in the second quarter and the Zoom Masters on top, 62–47. Añejo paid a total fine of P550,000.

== Road to the finals ==
Shell		Añejo
Finished 8–2 (.800), tied for 1st	Eliminations	Finished 8–2 (.800), tied for 1st
Finished 14–4 (.778), 1st	Semifinals	Finished 12–6 (.667), 2nd

== Series scoring summary ==
Team	Game 1	Game 2	Game 3	Game 4	Game 5	Game 6	Wins
Formula Shell	134	127	156	138	101	62	4
Anejo Rum 65	131	135	134	135	130	47	2
Venue	ULTRA	ULTRA	ULTRA	ULTRA	ULTRA	ULTRA	ULTRA

== Games summary ==
=== Game 1 ===
Vintage

May 3

Formula Shell Zoom Masters 134, Añejo Rum 65ers 131
Scoring by quarter: 32-32, 27-30, 40-34, 35-35
Pts: Bobby Parks 50 Ronnie Magsanoc 29	Pts: Sylvester Gray 42
Shell leads series, 1-0

The ULTRA, Pasig

Ronnie Magsanoc shatter a 115-all deadlock with a crucial six-point swing within 21 seconds, a three-point shot and a three-point play off a foul by Rudy Distrito that gave the lead to the Zoom Masters for good at 121–115. Bobby Parks shot nine of Shell's last eleven points in the final 2:49. The 65ers rallied back behind four straight points by Sylvester Gray to close within one, 131–132, with 13 seconds left. Bobby Parks was fouled by Añejo playing coach Robert Jaworski and his two free throws decided the outcome of the game.

=== Game 2 ===
Vintage

May 6

Formula Shell Zoom Masters 127, Añejo Rum 65ers 135
Scoring by quarter: 26-23, 29-30, 31-27, 49-47
Pts: Chito Loyzaga 26	Pts: Bobby Parks 52
Series tied, 1-1

The ULTRA, Pasig

Añejo led by as much as 14 points, 108–94, with six minutes to go in the final period, the never-say-die Shell Zoom Masters managed to trim down the deficit to three points, 125–128, on six triples by Ronnie Magsanoc.

=== Game 3 ===
Vintage

May 8

Formula Shell Zoom Masters 156, Añejo Rum 65ers 134
Scoring by quarter: 24-35, 43-26, 42-32, 47-41
Pts: Bobby Parks 35 Ronnie Magsanoc 34; Rebs: Bobby Parks 12; Asts: Bobby Parks 11
Shell leads series, 2-1

The ULTRA, Pasig

Shell allowed Añejo to take the first quarter lead, 35–24, but spewed fire all over in the next three quarters, even leading by 31 points in the final quarter. Ronnie Magsanoc hit six triples and finish the game with 34 points, the Zoom Masters netted 42 points from fastbreaks and shot a high 59 percent from the field, sinking 59 of 100 tries.

=== Game 4 ===
Vintage

May 10

Formula Shell Zoom Masters 138, Añejo Rum 65ers 135 (OT)
Scoring by quarter: 34-33, 21-25, 35-28, 31-35, Overtime: 17-14
Pts: Bobby Parks 42 Ronnie Magsanoc 36	Pts: Sylvester Gray 44 Dante Gonzalgo 30
Shell leads series, 3-1

The ULTRA, Pasig

Ronnie Magsanoc released seven booming triples in a career-high 36 points in a dazzling show, including a brilliant steal off Philip Cezar with few seconds left in overtime, Shell on top, 136–135.

=== Game 5 ===
Vintage

May 13

Formula Shell Zoom Masters 101, Añejo Rum 65ers 130
Shell leads series, 3-2

The ULTRA, Pasig

With still 2:05 in the first quarter, Añejo leading 27–23, Rudy Distrito smacked Ronnie Magsanoc, who was attempting a three-pointer, with a hard, closed fist which sent Magsanoc crashing to the floor, the hard foul affected his shooting throughout the game. Shell's Arnie Tuadles, probably provoked for what happen to Magsanoc, also committed a dangerous foul off a driving Chito Loyzaga in the second quarter, Loyzaga suffered a swollen left eye. Both Distrito and Tuadles were eventually fined P 3,000 each.

=== Game 6 ===
Vintage

May 15

Formula Shell Zoom Masters 62, Añejo Rum 65ers 47 (forfeit)
Scoring by quarter: 40-26, 22-21
Shell wins series, 4-2

The ULTRA, Pasig
Referees: G. Ledesma, E. de Leon, R. Hines

A series of turnovers by the 65ers enabled the Zoom Masters to launch a 13-0 bomb that parlayed a rather slim 26–21 lead to a 39-21 bubble en route to a 40-26 count at the close of the first quarter. Sylvester Gray banged in 12 of Añejo's first 19 points in the second quarter, cutting the Shell lead down to a single digit, 45–53, but then Gray was whistled for his fourth personal with 5:42 before halftime. The Añejo import got his fifth as he tried to snatch the ball away from Paras with 4:01 before lemontime.

With the score pegged at 62-47 for Shell with 2:52 remaining in the second quarter, Bobby Parks squeezed in between Rey Cuenco and Dante Gonzalgo, and referee Rudy Hines slapped Cuenco with his fourth personal and from complaining too much, Rey Cuenco got a technical and this seemed to irked him more as he tapped referee Rudy Hines' nape, earning him his second technical and was ejected for the ballgame. Following an Añejo timeout and a commercial break, Añejo playing coach Robert Jaworski went to the officials table as photographers and cameramen were all over him. An angered and pre-dominantly Añejo gallery began throwing all sorts of debris that rained on the hardcourt and play had to be stopped. The 65ers went to their locker room with team manager Bernabe Navarro leading the walkout and the Zoom Masters also going to their locker. PBA Commissioner Rudy Salud gave both teams 10 minutes to get back to the hardcourt. The Shell team went back but the 65ers did not return. Commissioner Salud then gave two 90-second ultimatum for Añejo but the 65ers were never to be seen again. It was only then the Zoom Masters were declared champions by game forfeiture.

Due to the walkout, Añejo did not claim their runner-up trophy for this championship series. The trophy is currently displayed at the PBA's head office in Libis, Quezon City.

1990 PBA First Conference Champions

Formula Shell Zoom Masters
First title

== Rosters ==
Formula Shell Zoom Masters roster
Players
Coaches

Pos.	No.	Nat.	Name	Ht.	Wt.
F	2	(Philippines)	Jay Ramirez	6 ft 2 in (1.88 m)		Visayas
G	5	(Philippines)	Ronnie Magsanoc	5 ft 9 in (1.75 m)		UP Diliman
F	8	(Philippines)	Jerry Ruiz	6 ft 2 in (1.88 m)		Letran
G	9	(Philippines)	Aris Franco	5 ft 11 in (1.80 m)		Lyceum
F	10	(Philippines)	Jojo Martin	6 ft 3 in (1.91 m)		NCBA
F	11	(Philippines)	Arnie Tuadles	6 ft 2 in (1.88 m)		Visayas
F	12	(Philippines)	Romeo Dela Rosa	6 ft 2 in (1.88 m)		Southwestern-U
G	13	(Philippines)	Leo Austria	5 ft 10 in (1.78 m)		Lyceum
C	14	(Philippines)	Benjie Paras	6 ft 5 in (1.96 m)		UP Diliman
C	19	(Philippines)	Eduardo Ducut	6 ft 5 in (1.96 m)		Letran
F	22	(United States)	Bobby Parks (I)	6 ft 3 in (1.91 m)		Memphis
F	24	(Philippines)	Richard Bognot	6 ft 3 in (1.91 m)
G	33	(Philippines)	Calvin Tuadles	5 ft 11 in (1.80 m)		Southwestern-U

Head coach

- (Philippines) Arlene Rodriguez

Assistant coach(es)

Legend

- (C) Team captain
- (I) Import
- Injured

Añejo Rum 65ers roster
Players
Coaches

Pos.	#	POB	Name	Height	Weight	DOB (YYYY–MM–DD)	From
C	00	(United States)	Sylvester Gray (I)	6 ft 6 in (1.98 m)			Memphis
C	4	(Philippines)	Peter Aguilar	6 ft 5 in (1.96 m)			TUA
G	5	(Philippines)	Mukesh Advani	5 ft 10 in (1.78 m)			San Beda
F	6	(Philippines)	Dondon Ampalayo	6 ft 3 in (1.91 m)			USJ–R
G	7	(Philippines)	Robert Jaworski	6 ft 1 in (1.85 m)			UE
G	9	(Philippines)	Leo Isaac	6 ft 1 in (1.85 m)			Mapúa
G	10	(Philippines)	Freddie Hubalde	6 ft 1 in (1.85 m)			Mapúa
F	12	(Philippines)	Dante Gonzalgo	6 ft 2 in (1.88 m)			Lyceum
F	14	(Philippines)	Larry Villanil	6 ft 1 in (1.85 m)			USPF
F/C	15	(Philippines)	Rey Cuenco	6 ft 4 in (1.93 m)			De La Salle Araneta
G	17	(Philippines)	Rudy Distrito	5 ft 11 in (1.80 m)			UE
F	18	(Philippines)	Philip Cezar	6 ft 3 in (1.91 m)			José Rizal
C	22	(Philippines)	Romulo Mamaril	6 ft 6 in (1.98 m)			Mapúa
F	41	(Philippines)	Chito Loyzaga	6 ft 2 in (1.88 m)			San Beda

Head coach

- (Philippines) Robert Jaworski

Assistant coach(es)

- (Philippines) Rino Salazar

Legend

- (C) Team captain
- (CI) Commissioner's Cup Import
- (GI) Governors' Cup Import
- (EI) EASL Import
- (DP) Unsigned draft pick
- (FA) Free agent
- (IN) Inactive
- (S) Suspended
- (R) Rookie
- (I) Import
- Injured

== Broadcast notes ==
Game	Play-by-play	Analyst
Game 1	Sev Sarmenta	Butch Maniego
Game 2	Ed Picson	Quinito Henson
Game 3	Joe Cantada	Andy Jao
Game 4	Joe Cantada	Butch Maniego
Game 5	Ed Picson	Quinito Henson
Game 6	Sev Sarmenta	Andy Jao
