= 1991 PBA Third Conference finals =

| Team | Coach | Wins |
|---|---|---|
| Alaska Milkmen | Tim Cone | 3 |
| Ginebra San Miguel | Robert Jaworski | 1 |
- Dates: December 8–15, 1991
- Television: Vintage Sports (PTV)
- Radio network: DZAM

PBA Third Conference finals chronology
- < 1990 1992 >

PBA finals chronology
- < 1991 All-Filipino 1992 First Conference >

The 1991 PBA Third Conference finals was the best-of-5 basketball championship series of the 1991 PBA Third Conference, and the conclusion of the conference's playoffs. The Alaska Milkmen and Ginebra San Miguel played for the 50th championship contested by the league.

Alaska Milk won their first PBA title after five years, winning their finals series against Ginebra San Miguel, 3 games to 1.

== Qualification ==
| Alaska | | Ginebra |
|---|---|---|
| Finished 7–4 (.636), tied for 2nd | Eliminations | Finished 7–4 (.636), tied for 2nd |
| Finished 12–7 (.632), tied for 1st | Semifinals | Finished 12–7 (.632), tied for 1st |

== Series scoring summary ==
| Team | Game 1 | Game 2 | Game 3 | Game 4 | Wins |
|---|---|---|---|---|---|
| Alaska | 93 | 105 | 122 | 99 | 3 |
| Ginebra | 92 | 107 | 103 | 90 | 1 |
| Venue | ULTRA | ULTRA | ULTRA | ULTRA |

== Games summary ==
=== Game 1 ===
Vintage

December 8

Alaska Milkmen 93, Ginebra San Miguel 92
| Pts: Sean Chambers 37 | Pts: Wes Matthews 38 |
Alaska leads series, 1–0

The ULTRA, Pasig, Metro Manila

Sean Chambers hit all of the Milkmen's last seven points and highlighted the stirring performance with a daring drive with six seconds left. Wes Matthews banged in a triple that tied the count at 90-all with 18 seconds to go, Chito Loyzaga shoved Ginebra ahead, 92–91, with two free throws. Alaska sued for time with 15 seconds remaining and Sean Chambers took matters into his own hands and drove in for the marginal basket.

=== Game 2 ===
Vintage

December 10

Alaska Milkmen 105, Ginebra San Miguel 107
Scoring by quarter: 24–24, 28–27, 28–23, 25–33
| Pts: Sean Chambers 30 | Pts: Wes Matthews 42 |
Series tied, 1–1

The ULTRA, Pasig, Metro Manila

Wes Matthews canned in two free throws for a 107–103 lead that capped his team's long-game struggle. Ginebra trailed by 13 points, 63–76, with 3:15 left in the third quarter. Wes Matthews scored on a rare four-point play to tie the count at 93-all with 5:05 remaining in the game. With the score at 103–101 in favor of Ginebra, following Leo Isaac's 20-footer from left quartercourt with 30 seconds to go, the next play turned out to be controversial, Jojo Lastimosa's attempt bounced high off the rim with Paul Alvarez tipping the ball in, referee Bay Ledesma nullified the basket and giving the Gins possession with time down to 15 seconds, Rudy Distrito knocked in two more charities for a 105–101 advantage for Ginebra.

=== Game 3 ===
Vintage

December 12

Alaska Milkmen 122, Ginebra San Miguel 103
Scoring by quarter: 22–19, 26–26, 40–29, 34–29
| Pts: Sean Chambers 34; Rebs: Chambers 15; Asts: Chambers 11 | Pts: Wes Matthews 26 |
Alaska leads series, 2–1

The ULTRA, Pasig, Metro Manila

Alaska stormed ahead, 88–73 on a 14–3 run, the Milkmen open gaps as wide as 23 points, 107–84, halfway through the final period. Alaska reserves Nandy Garcia and Roehl Gomez put on fine performances, outdoing themselves on the scoring end with Gomez hitting two straight triples in the fourth quarter.

=== Game 4 ===
Vintage

December 15

Alaska Milkmen 99, Ginebra San Miguel 90
Scoring by quarter: 28–24, 21–21, 23–23, 27–22
| Pts: Sean Chambers 30 Paul Alvarez 30; Rebs: Chambers 14 | Pts: Wes Matthews 31 Chito Loyzaga 28; Rebs: Matthews 10 |
Alaska wins series, 3–1

The ULTRA, Pasig, Metro Manila

Wes Matthews was limited to only one field goal in the second half and was shut out in the last 2:27 of the game when Ginebra came to within three points at 90–93. Dondon Ampalayo muffed in a finger roll and a three-pointer, allowing Sean Chambers to knock in a running bank shot for a 95–90 count for Alaska. Paul Alvarez sealed the win for the Milkmen with a pair of free throws with time down to 18 seconds.

1991 PBA Third Conference Champions

Alaska Milkmen
First title

== Rosters ==
Alaska Milkmen roster
Players
Coaches

| Pos. | # | POB | Name | Height | Weight | DOB (YYYY–MM–DD) | From |
|---|---|---|---|---|---|---|---|
| C | 4 | (Philippines) | Peter Aguilar | 6 ft 5 in (1.96 m) | | | TUA |
| G | 6 | (Philippines) | Biboy Ravanes | 6 ft 0 in (1.83 m) | | | Cebu |
| G | 7 | (Philippines) | Roehl Gomez | 6 ft 0 in (1.83 m) | | | Cebu |
| F | 8 | (Philippines) | Nandy Garcia | 6 ft 2 in (1.88 m) | | | Adamson |
| G/F | 9 | (Philippines) | Jojo Lastimosa | 6 ft 0 in (1.83 m) | | | USJ–R |
| C | 10 | (Philippines) | Adriano Polistico | 6 ft 7 in (2.01 m) | | | Letran |
| G | 11 | (Philippines) | Eugene Quilban | 5 ft 7 in (1.70 m) | | | San Sebastian |
| G | 12 | (Philippines) | Eton Navarro | 6 ft 0 in (1.83 m) | | | San Sebastian |
| C | 14 | (Philippines) | Alex Araneta | 6 ft 6 in (1.98 m) | | | Ateneo |
| G/F | 20 | (United States) | Sean Chambers (I) | 6 ft 1 in (1.85 m) | | | Cal Poly |
| G | 22 | (Philippines) | Frankie Lim | 5 ft 10 in (1.78 m) | | | San Beda |
| F | 23 | (Philippines) | Paul Alvarez | 6 ft 0 in (1.83 m) | | | San Sebastian |
| F | 55 | (Philippines) | Nap Hatton | 6 ft 1 in (1.85 m) | | | San Sebastian |

Head coach

- (Philippines) Tim Cone

Assistant coach(es)

- (Philippines) Chot Reyes

Legend

- (C) Team captain
- (CI) Commissioner's Cup Import
- (GI) Governors' Cup Import
- (EI) EASL Import
- (DP) Unsigned draft pick
- (FA) Free agent
- (IN) Inactive
- (S) Suspended
- (R) Rookie
- (I) Import
- Injured

Ginebra San Miguel roster
Players
Coaches

| Pos. | # | POB | Name | Height | Weight | DOB (YYYY–MM–DD) | From |
|---|---|---|---|---|---|---|---|
| G/F | 1 | (United States) | Wes Matthews (I) | 6 ft 1 in (1.85 m) | | | Wisconsin |
| F | 6 | (Philippines) | Dondon Ampalayo | 6 ft 3 in (1.91 m) | | | USJ–R |
| G | 7 | (Philippines) | Robert Jaworski | 6 ft 1 in (1.85 m) | | | UE |
| F | 8 | (Philippines) | Silverio Palad | 6 ft 2 in (1.88 m) | | | UST |
| G | 9 | (Philippines) | Leo Isaac | 6 ft 1 in (1.85 m) | | | Mapúa |
| C | 10 | (Philippines) | Anthony Poblador | 6 ft 6 in (1.98 m) | | | De La Salle |
| G | 11 | (Philippines) | Jayvee Gayoso | 6 ft 1 in (1.85 m) | | | Ateneo |
| F | 12 | (Philippines) | Dante Gonzalgo | 6 ft 2 in (1.88 m) | | | Lyceum |
| F | 14 | (Philippines) | Larry Villanil | 6 ft 1 in (1.85 m) | | | USPF |
| F/C | 15 | (Philippines) | Rey Cuenco | 6 ft 4 in (1.93 m) | | | De La Salle Araneta |
| G | 17 | (Philippines) | Rudy Distrito | 5 ft 11 in (1.80 m) | | | UE |
| F | 18 | (Philippines) | Philip Cezar | 6 ft 3 in (1.91 m) | | | José Rizal |
| F | 41 | (Philippines) | Chito Loyzaga | 6 ft 2 in (1.88 m) | | | San Beda |

Head coach

- (Philippines) Robert Jaworski

Assistant coach(es)

- (Philippines) Arlene Rodriguez

Legend

- (C) Team captain
- (CI) Commissioner's Cup Import
- (GI) Governors' Cup Import
- (EI) EASL Import
- (DP) Unsigned draft pick
- (FA) Free agent
- (IN) Inactive
- (S) Suspended
- (R) Rookie
- (I) Import
- Injured

== Broadcast notes ==
| Game | Play-by-play | Analyst |
|---|---|---|
| Game 1 | Ed Picson | Andy Jao |
| Game 2 | Sev Sarmenta | Quinito Henson |
| Game 3 | Bill Velasco | Andy Jao |
| Game 4 | Bill Velasco | Andy Jao |
