= 1988 PBA All-Filipino Conference finals =

Basketball cup finals

| Team | Coach | Wins |
|---|---|---|
| Añejo Rum 65ers | Robert Jaworski | 3 |
| Purefoods Hotdogs | Cris Calilan (Note: Ramon Fernandez have coached the Purefoods in Game 1.) | 1 |
- Dates: September 6–13, 1988
- Television: Vintage Sports (PTV)
- Radio network: DZSR

Referees
- Game 1: G. Ledezma, D. Bayais, R. Hines
- Game 2: G. Ledesma, D. Bayais, R. Besabe
- Game 3: A. Bartolome, L. Salac Jr. R. Hines
- Game 4: G. Ledesma, D. Bayais, E. de Leon

PBA All-Filipino Conference finals chronology
- < 1987 1989 >

The 1988 PBA All-Filipino Conference finals was the best-of-5 series basketball championship of the 1988 PBA All-Filipino Conference, and the conclusion of the conference's playoffs. The Añejo Rum 65ers and Purefoods Hotdogs played for the 40th championship contested by the league.

The Añejo Rum 65ers won the All-Filipino Conference title with a 3–1 series victory over Purefoods Hotdogs, for their 2nd PBA championship, the Rum Masters became the fifth team to win the All-Filipino crown.

== Qualification ==
| Purefoods | | Añejo |
|---|---|---|
| Finished 8–4 (.667), tied for 1st | Eliminations | Finished 7–5 (.583), tied for 2nd |
| Finished 13–7 (.650), 1st | Semifinals | Finished 12–8 (.600), tied for 2nd |
| Finished 13–7 (.650), 1st | Tiebreaker | Won against San Miguel, 102–100 |

== Series scoring summary ==
| Team | Game 1 | Game 2 | Game 3 | Game 4 | Wins |
|---|---|---|---|---|---|
| Añejo | 111 | 112 | 112 | 135 | 3 |
| Purefoods | 105 | 117 | 110 | 124 | 1 |
| Venue | ULTRA | ULTRA | ULTRA | ULTRA |

== Games summary ==
=== Game 1 ===
Vintage

September 6
7:20 pm

Purefoods Hotdogs 105, Añejo Rum 65ers 111
Scoring by quarter: 25–34, 30–27, 23–29, 27–21
| Pts: Alvin Patrimonio 34 | Pts: Joey Loyzaga 26 |
Añejo leads series, 1–0

The ULTRA, Pasig, Metro Manila
Referees: G. Ledezma, D. Bayais, R. Hines

Joey Loyzaga fired five three-point shots, all of them on crucial occasions, quelling as many Hotdogs uprising. In the fourth quarter, the Rum Masters got a big scare when the Hotdogs came within two, 97–99, behind Alvin Patrimonio, who scored 34 points, and Jerry Codinera, who showed muscle off the boards, but Joey Loyzaga quickly answered with a triple off a screen by brother Chito, that ignited another Añejo blitz and resulted to a 106–99 advantage.

=== Game 2 ===
Vintage

September 8
6:20 pm

Purefoods Hotdogs 117, Añejo Rum 65ers 112
Scoring by quarter: 28–25, 26–30, 38–30, 25–27
| Pts: Jojo Lastimosa 27 | Pts: Robert Jaworski 20 |
Series tied, 1–1

The ULTRA, Pasig, Metro Manila
Referees: G. Ledesma, D. Bayais, R. Besabe

Purefoods surprised everyone by benching Ramon Fernandez for the entire game. Purefoods coach Cris Calilan said there was an order from "higher ups" not to use Fernandez in Game two, the order came 30 minutes before the game. Company President Rene Buhain refused to comment on the benching of Fernandez but confirmed there was indeed such a directive. The Hotdogs started to pull away from a 98-all deadlock and the Rum Masters, who had six triples in the game, were silenced in the last seven minutes, Romulo Mamaril sank two free throws to close the gap at 111–108, but the Hotdogs' reserves Totoy Marquez and Willie Generalao retaliated to clinch the win for Purefoods.

=== Game 3 ===
Vintage

September 11
7:20 pm

Purefoods Hotdogs 110, Añejo Rum 65ers 112
Scoring by quarter: 39–27, 20–32, 27–26, 24–27
| Pts: Manuel Marquez 30 | Pts: Leo Isaac 26 |
Añejo leads series, 2–1

The ULTRA, Pasig, Metro Manila
Referees: A. Bartolome, L. Salac Jr. R. Hines

Ramon Fernandez watch helplessly at unexplained management decision to keep him on the bench, as Añejo moved within a game of winning the All-Filipino championship, Robert Jaworski's two pressure-laden charities and Hotdogs' Totoy Marquez missed on his last attempt allowed the Rum Masters to escape with a two-point victory. Purefoods raced to a leads of 25–9 and 34–19 early, and it took a full second quarter for Añejo to level the count at 59-all in the first 24 minutes of play. The Rum Masters opened the third period with an 8–2 run for a 67–61 lead, a 15–7 blast by Añejo put them on top, 107–105, with 2:09 left, two more deadlocks ensued before Robert Jaworski provided the marginal free throws, 112–109, 15 seconds remaining.

=== Game 4 ===
Vintage

September 13
6:30 pm

Purefoods Hotdogs 124, Añejo Rum 65ers 135 (OT)
Scoring by quarter: 30–23, 34–32, 28–31, 27–33, Overtime: 5–16
| Pts: Alvin Patrimonio 26 | Pts: Joey Loyzaga 28, Robert Jaworski 28 |
Añejo wins series, 3–1

The ULTRA, Pasig, Metro Manila
Referees: G. Ledesma, D. Bayais, E. de Leon

In a come-from-behind overtime victory, an ailing Dondon Ampalayo jumped from a six-hour dextrose detention to inject determination into Anejo's title surge while playing coach Jaworski provided the leadership including a follow-up of his own miss to send the game into extension, 119–119. The fouling out of Glenn Capacio and Willie Generalao compounded the woes of Purefoods during the overtime period. Joey Loyzaga's semi-hook shot with their shot clock winding down gave them a three-point edge at 125–122. On a return play after a Purefoods timeout, Romulo Mamaril block Alvin Patrimonio's attempt that started a series of errors for Purefoods with less than a minute to go in the extra period, Jaworski's two free throws with 45 seconds remaining gave the Rum Masters a six-point lead, 128–122.

The Hotdogs opened fire in the third quarter, leading by as much as 19 points at 76–57, but the Rum Masters slowly clawed back and were down by six, 86–92, going into the final period. Añejo grabbed the upper hand at 95–94 on Mamaril's bank shot, the Hotdogs maintain their composure and led 114–107, with 2:26 remaining in regulation, and then came a 12–5 Añejo spurt, starting with Dondon Ampalayo nailing a three-pointer.

Ramon Fernandez, who was vanish for the whole series by the Purefoods management, walked inside the arena midway in the second quarter and seated to watch his former teammates.

1988 PBA All-Filipino Conference Champions

Añejo Rum 65ers
Second title

== Rosters ==
Añejo Rum 65ers roster
Players
Coaches

| Pos. | # | POB | Name | Height | Weight | DOB (YYYY–MM–DD) | From |
|---|---|---|---|---|---|---|---|
| G | 5 | (Philippines) | Mukesh Advani | 5 ft 11 in (1.80 m) | | | San Beda |
| F | 6 | (Philippines) | Dondon Ampalayo | 6 ft 3 in (1.91 m) | | | USJ–R |
| G | 7 | (Philippines) | Robert Jaworski | 6 ft 1 in (1.85 m) | | | UE |
| G | 9 | (Philippines) | Leo Isaac | 6 ft 1 in (1.85 m) | | | Mapúa |
| C | 10 | (Philippines) | Eduardo Ducut | 6 ft 5 in (1.96 m) | | | Letran |
| F | 12 | (Philippines) | Dante Gonzalgo | 6 ft 2 in (1.88 m) | | | Lyceum |
| F | 13 | (Philippines) | Harmon Codiñera | 6 ft 4 in (1.93 m) | | | Far Eastern |
| G | 14 | (Philippines) | Joey Loyzaga | 6 ft 0 in (1.83 m) | | | San Beda |
| G | 17 | (Philippines) | Rudy Distrito | 5 ft 11 in (1.80 m) | | | UE |
| C | 22 | (Philippines) | Romulo Mamaril | 6 ft 6 in (1.98 m) | | | Mapúa |
| C | 30 | (Philippines) | Cayetano Salazar | 6 ft 5 in (1.96 m) | | | Letran |
| F | 41 | (Philippines) | Chito Loyzaga | 6 ft 2 in (1.88 m) | | | San Beda |

Head coach

- (Philippines) Robert Jaworski

Assistant coach(es)

- (Philippines) Rino Salazar

Team manager

- (Philippines) Bernabe Navarro

Legend

- (C) Team captain
- (CI) Commissioner's Cup Import
- (GI) Governors' Cup Import
- (EI) EASL Import
- (DP) Unsigned draft pick
- (FA) Free agent
- (IN) Inactive
- (S) Suspended
- (R) Rookie
- Injured

Purefoods Hotdogs roster
Players

| Pos. | # | POB | Name | Height | Weight | DOB (YYYY–MM–DD) | From |
|---|---|---|---|---|---|---|---|
| G | 6 | (Philippines) | Jojo Lastimosa | 6 ft 1 in (1.85 m) | | | USJ–R |
| G | 8 | (Philippines) | Al Solis | 5 ft 11 in (1.80 m) | | | Visayas |
| G | 9 | (Philippines) | Joshua Villapando | 6 ft 1 in (1.85 m) | | | PSBA |
| G | 12 | (Philippines) | Glenn Capacio | 6 ft 1 in (1.85 m) | | | Far Eastern |
| C | 14 | (Philippines) | Jack Tanuan | 6 ft 6 in (1.98 m) | | | Far Eastern |
| F | 16 | (Philippines) | Alvin Patrimonio | 6 ft 3 in (1.91 m) | | | Mapúa |
| F | 17 | (Philippines) | Padim Israel | 6 ft 3 in (1.91 m) | | | Ateneo |
| C | 19 | (Philippines) | Ramon Fernandez | 6 ft 4 in (1.93 m) | | | San Carlos |
| F | 24 | (Philippines) | Jose Yango | 6 ft 3 in (1.91 m) | | | San Beda |
| G | 42 | (Philippines) | Willie Generalao | 5 ft 8 in (1.73 m) | | | Visayas |
| C | 44 | (Philippines) | Jerry Codinera | 6 ft 5 in (1.96 m) | | | UE |
| F | 71 | (Philippines) | Manuel Marquez | 6 ft 2 in (1.88 m) | | | San Beda |

Coaches

Head coach

- (Philippines) Cris Calilan

Assistant coach(es)

- (Philippines) Ely Capacio

Legend

- (C) Team captain
- Injured

== Broadcast notes ==
| Game | Play-by-play | Analyst |
|---|---|---|
| Game 1 | Pinggoy Penson | Andy Jao |
| Game 2 | Joe Cantada | Joaqui Trillo |
| Game 3 | Joe Cantada | Joaqui Trillo |
| Game 4 | Pinggoy Pengson | Andy Jao |
