= 1991 PBA First Conference finals =

Team	Coach	Wins
Ginebra San Miguel	Robert Jaworski	4
Shell Rimula X	Arlene Rodriguez	3
- Dates: May 5–19, 1991
- Television: Vintage Sports (PTV)
- Radio network: DZAM

PBA First Conference finals chronology
- < 1990 1992 >

PBA finals chronology
- < 1990 Third 1991 All-Filipino >

The 1991 PBA First Conference finals was the best-of-7 basketball championship series of the 1991 PBA First Conference, and the conclusion of the conference's playoffs. Ginebra San Miguel and the Shell Rimula X played for the 48th championship contested by the league.

This series also serves as a rematch after Shell captured the championship in the same conference a year before when Ginebra (then known as the Añejo Rum 65ers) walked out of the playing court in the sixth and series-clinching game with Shell leading, 62-47 with 2:52 left in the second quarter.

Ginebra San Miguel won against Shell Rimula X in seven games to capture their third PBA title, coming from a 1-3 deficit. Ginebra's championship victory was the biggest PBA finals comeback in the league's history until the 2015–16 Philippine Cup finals when the San Miguel Beermen came back from a 0–3 deficit to defeat the Alaska Aces and win the championship series.

== Road to the finals ==
Shell		Ginebra
Finished 8–3 (.727), 1st	Eliminations	Finished 5–6 (.455), 5th
Finished 12–7 (.632), tied for 1st	Semifinals	Finished 12–7 (.632), tied for 1st

Shell finished the elimination round at first place, with an 8-3 record. However, they split their semifinals matches 4-4, ending up with a 12-7 card going into the finals.

Ginebra on the other hand barely made it to the semifinals, getting the fifth and last semis berth with a 5-6 eliminations win–loss record. In the semifinals, they lost their first match, but won their next seven games in succession to force a tie in first place and secured the other finals seat.

== Series scoring summary ==
Team	Game 1	Game 2	Game 3	Game 4	Game 5	Game 6	Game 7	Wins
Shell	114	114	120	127	90	119	102	3
Ginebra	109	125	113	125	116	123	104	4
Venue	ULTRA	ULTRA	ULTRA	ULTRA	ULTRA	ULTRA	ULTRA

== Games summary ==
=== Game 1 ===
Vintage

May 5

boxscores

Shell Rimula X 114, Ginebra San Miguel 109
Scoring by quarter: 31-25, 21-31, 32-29, 30-24
Pts: Bobby Parks 38; Rebs: Benjie Paras 14; Asts: Bobby Parks 8	Pts: Jervis Cole 39; Rebs: Jervis Cole 11; Asts: Robert Jaworski 6
Shell leads series, 1-0

The ULTRA, Pasig
Attendance: 9,453
Referees: G. Ledesma, B. Chua, L. Varela

The tandem of Benjie Paras and Ronnie Magsanoc led Shell to their first victory of the series. Ginebra made a late game surge to reduce Shell's lead by two with almost two minutes left, but passing errors in the last minute of the game cost Ginebra the possible comeback.

=== Game 2 ===
Vintage

May 7

boxscores

Shell Rimula X 114, Ginebra San Miguel 125 (OT)
Scoring by quarter: 21-27, 26-30, 25-25, 38-28, Overtime: 4-15
Pts: Bobby Parks 49; Rebs: Benjie Paras 13; Asts: Ronnie Magsanoc 9	Pts: Jervis Cole 47; Rebs: Jervis Cole 16; Asts: Rudy Distrito 5
Series tied, 1-1

The ULTRA, Pasig
Attendance: 7,647

Ginebra was leading the game 90-79 at the start of the fourth quarter when Shell made a 13-2 run to tie the game at 92-all. After Rudy Distrito scored to restore Ginebra's lead, a layup of Bobby Parks and a three-point play by Ronnie Magsanoc gave Shell the lead with 6:40 left. Shell then pushed the lead further to five, 101-96, until playing coach Robert Jaworski scored 10 straight points in the final four minutes of the fourth quarter, forcing the game into overtime, 110-all.

In overtime, Jaworski continued his scoring run and gave Ronnie Magsanoc his sixth foul. Shell scored only five points in the extension period.

=== Game 3 ===
Vintage

May 9

recap

Shell Rimula X 120, Ginebra San Miguel 113
Scoring by quarter: 42-23, 31-28, 18-24, 29-38
Shell leads series, 2-1

The ULTRA, Pasig

Shell was leading the game entering the fourth quarter, 91-75. Robert Jaworski started the quarter orchestrating an 11-point run to put Ginebra within reach, 95-83. Jervis Cole took the game closer with a 10-4 run to bring back the Gins, 99-93. Dondon Ampalayo joined the surge, scoring five straight points, including a 20-foot three point shot. Chito Loyzaga made the crucial free throws to reduce Shell's lead by three, 103-100. Just as Ginebra is knocking on Shell's door, Ronnie Magsanoc scored eight straight points, dozing off a possible Ginebra comeback.

=== Game 4 ===
Vintage

May 12

recap

Shell Rimula X 127, Ginebra San Miguel 125 (OT)
Shell leads series, 3-1

The ULTRA, Pasig

Shell took over the game in overtime, with Ronnie Magsanoc scored a total of 28 points (14 came from the second half), including a back-to-back field goals, that sealed the victory for Shell with 49 seconds left. Meanwhile, Playing coach Robert Jaworski protested the game's officiating, with the pro-Ginebra crowd inside the ULTRA pelted the hardcourt with coins and other debris after the game.

=== Game 5 ===
Vintage

May 14

recap

Shell Rimula X 90, Ginebra San Miguel 116
Shell leads series, 3-2

The ULTRA, Pasig

After the incident that occurred after game 4, PBA commissioner Rudy Salud requested for additional security from the ULTRA management and the Philippine National Police, to prevent any incident involving Ginebra and Shell supporters.

With Ginebra's back behind against the wall, they made a 32-0 run, from an 80-85 deficit, to pull away with the victory, denying Shell the series-clinching game and extending the series for another game. This currently stands as the most number of consecutive and unanswered points in a PBA game.

=== Game 6 ===
Vintage

May 16

recap

Shell Rimula X 119, Ginebra San Miguel 123
Scoring by quarter: 31-20, 27-28, 36-40, 25-35
Pts: Bobby Parks 36; Rebs: Bobby Parks 16; Asts: Bobby Parks 8	Pts: Jervis Cole 51; Rebs: Jervis Cole 5 Asts: Robert Jaworski 9
Series tied, 3-3

The ULTRA, Pasig
Attendance: 8,559

Shell was leading the game most of the game, with leading as much as 14 points in the second quarter. Ginebra then came back with Jervis Cole, Chito Loyzaga and Philip Cezar leading the surge to reduce Shell's lead at the final quarter, 94-98. Bobby Parks tried to keep Shell's lead with a three-point play and giving them the lead, 111-106 with 5:04 left. But Ginebra made another run, this time was led by Rudy Distrito, who made six points, including two free throws that gave Ginebra the lead with 69 seconds left.

=== Game 7 ===
Vintage

May 19

boxscores

Shell Rimula X 102, Ginebra San Miguel 104
Scoring by quarter: 32-23, 23-30, 27-28, 20-23
Pts: Bobby Parks 33; Rebs: Bobby Parks 16; Asts: Benjie Paras 4	Pts: Jervis Cole 32; Rebs: Jervis Cole 19; Asts: Robert Jaworski 6
Ginebra wins series, 4-3

The ULTRA, Pasig
Referees: E. de Leon, S. Cordero Jr., B. Chua

With five seconds remaining in the game, Ginebra had the possession with both teams tied at 102-all. After Robert Jaworski signaled Rudy Distrito to drive into the painted area, he passed the ball to Distrito and made an off balance shot with Shell's Jojo Martin and Benjie Paras defending the basket. The shot went in and gave Ginebra a two-point lead, with one second remaining. Shell called a timeout to advance the ball at the half court. Ronnie Magsanoc tried a three-point attempt but was blocked by Jervis Cole.

Ginebra won the championship, making them the only team in PBA history to win a finals series coming from a 1-3 deficit.

1991 PBA First Conference Champions

Ginebra San Miguel
Third title

== Quotes from the finals ==
Sarmenta: The inbound. Distrito. All the way... YES!!! YES!!!
Jao: YES!!! There's still one second!
Sarmenta: One second to go. Still one second to go! And a timeout by Shell.
Jao: This game is not over.
Sarmenta: It is not over, yes. Timeout called by Shell. Distrito with a major, major basket.

— Vintage Sports announcers Sev Sarmenta and Andy Jao calling the game winning shot from Rudy Distrito.

And it's all over! All over! Ginebra with a come from behind championship, down three to one, doing a come from behind victory in this championship of the First Conference.

— Vintage Sports announcer Sev Sarmenta calling the final seconds of Game 7.

== Rosters ==
Ginebra San Miguel roster
Players
Coaches

Pos.	#	POB	Name	Height	Weight	DOB (YYYY–MM–DD)	From
F	6	(Philippines)	Dondon Ampalayo	6 ft 3 in (1.91 m)			USJ–R
G	7	(Philippines)	Robert Jaworski	6 ft 1 in (1.85 m)			UE
F	8	(Philippines)	Silverio Palad	6 ft 2 in (1.88 m)			UST
G	9	(Philippines)	Leo Isaac	6 ft 1 in (1.85 m)			Mapúa
C	10	(Philippines)	Anthony Poblador	6 ft 6 in (1.98 m)			De La Salle
G	11	(Philippines)	Jayvee Gayoso	6 ft 1 in (1.85 m)			Ateneo
F	12	(Philippines)	Dante Gonzalgo	6 ft 2 in (1.88 m)			Lyceum
F	14	(Philippines)	Larry Villanil	6 ft 1 in (1.85 m)			USPF
F/C	15	(Philippines)	Rey Cuenco	6 ft 4 in (1.93 m)			De La Salle Araneta
G	17	(Philippines)	Rudy Distrito	5 ft 11 in (1.80 m)			UE
F	18	(Philippines)	Philip Cezar	6 ft 3 in (1.91 m)			José Rizal
F/C	32	(United States)	Jervis Cole (I)	6 ft 5 in (1.96 m)			Fresno State
F	41	(Philippines)	Chito Loyzaga	6 ft 2 in (1.88 m)			San Beda

Head coach

- (Philippines) Robert Jaworski

Assistant coach(es)

- (Philippines) Arlene Rodriguez
- (Philippines) Rino Salazar

Team manager

- (Philippines) Bernabe Navarro

Legend

- (C) Team captain
- (CI) Commissioner's Cup Import
- (GI) Governors' Cup Import
- (EI) EASL Import
- (DP) Unsigned draft pick
- (FA) Free agent
- (IN) Inactive
- (S) Suspended
- (R) Rookie
- (I) Import
- Injured

Shell Rimula X roster
Players

Pos.	#	POB	Name	Height	Weight	DOB (YYYY–MM–DD)	From
F	2	(Philippines)	Jay Ramirez	6 ft 2 in (1.88 m)			Visayas
C	4	(Philippines)	Romulo Mamaril	6 ft 6 in (1.98 m)			Mapúa
G	5	(Philippines)	Ronnie Magsanoc	5 ft 9 in (1.75 m)			UP Diliman
F	8	(Philippines)	Jerry Ruiz	6 ft 2 in (1.88 m)			Letran
F	10	(Philippines)	Jojo Martin	6 ft 3 in (1.91 m)			NCBA
F	12	(Philippines)	Romeo Dela Rosa	6 ft 2 in (1.88 m)			Southwestern-U
G	13	(Philippines)	Leo Austria	5 ft 10 in (1.78 m)			Lyceum
C	14	(Philippines)	Benjie Paras	6 ft 5 in (1.96 m)			UP Diliman
F	22	(United States)	Bobby Parks (I)	6 ft 3 in (1.91 m)			Memphis
F	24	(Philippines)	Richard Bognot	6 ft 3 in (1.91 m)
C	25	(Philippines)	Gido Babilonia	6 ft 6 in (1.98 m)			UST
G	33	(Philippines)	Calvin Tuadles	5 ft 11 in (1.80 m)			Southwestern-U

Coaches

Head coach

- (Philippines) Arlene Rodriguez

Assistant coach(es)

Legend

- (C) Team captain
- (I) Import
- Injured

== Broadcast notes ==
Game	Play-by-play	Analyst
Game 1	Sev Sarmenta	Andy Jao
Game 2	Ed Picson	Quinito Henson
Game 3	Bill Velasco	Butch Maniego
Game 4	Sev Sarmenta	Quinito Henson
Game 5	Ed Picson	Andy Jao
Game 6	Sev Sarmenta	Quinito Henson
Game 7	Sev Sarmenta	Andy Jao
