= 1990 PBA All-Filipino Conference finals =

Basketball championship series

Team	Coach	Wins
Presto Tivolis	Jimmy Mariano	4
Purefoods Hotdogs	Baby Dalupan	3
- Dates: August 21 – September 4, 1990
- Television: Vintage Sports (PTV)
- Radio network: DZAM

PBA All-Filipino Conference finals chronology
- < 1989 1991 >

PBA finals chronology
- < 1990 First 1990 Third >

The 1990 PBA All Filipino Conference finals was the best-of-7 basketball championship series of the 1990 PBA All-Filipino Conference, and the conclusion of the conference's playoffs. The Presto Tivolis and Purefoods Hotdogs played for the 46th championship contested by the league.

The Presto Tivolis wins their 6th PBA title and its fourth All-Filipino crown with a 4–3 series victory against Purefoods Hotdogs, which failed to win the prestigious All-Filipino plum for the third straight year, their finals series marked only the third time the championship went into a full route of seven games.

== Qualification ==
Purefoods		Presto
Finished 7–3 (.700), tied for 2nd	Eliminations	Finished 10–0 (1.000), 1st
Finished 13–5 (.722), tied for 1st	Semifinals	Finished 13–5 (.722), tied for 1st
Finished 13–5 (.722), tied for 1st	Playoff	Won against playoff survivor San Miguel, 117–115

== Series scoring summary ==
Team	Game 1	Game 2	Game 3	Game 4	Game 5	Game 6	Game 7	Wins
Presto Tivoli	99	124	115	123	123	117	115	4
Purefoods Hotdogs	95	125	111	139	119	128	96	3
Venue	ULTRA	ULTRA	ULTRA	ULTRA	ULTRA	ULTRA	ULTRA

== Games summary ==
=== Game 1 ===
Vintage

August 21

Presto Tivolis 99, Purefoods Hotdogs 95
Scoring by quarter: 24–22, 30–24, 18–22, 27–27
Pts: Manny Victorino 21	Pts: Nelson Asaytono 27
Presto leads series, 1–0

The ULTRA, Pasig

Presto Tivolis, getting the big plays from Arnie Tuadles and Zaldy Realubit, frustrated the Hotdogs, who failed to cash in on their winning plays in the dying seconds. Alvin Patrimonio muffed a gift shot, failing to complete a three-point play and preventing the Hotdogs from taking a crucial one-point lead in the final 30 seconds. Arnie Tuadles scored underneath the basket with the foul from Patrimonio, giving the Tivolis a 97–95 lead with 14 seconds left, Tuadles missed his bonus free throw but Zaldy Realubit outwitted Jerry Codinera for the rebound and stretch in for a lay-up and fished a foul from Codinera to seal the game. The Tivolis had their largest lead of 13 points at 62–49 in the third quarter, the Hotdogs erased that deficit with Nelson Asaytono erupting with 17 of his night-high 27 points in the fourth quarter as Purefoods came closer to within a point, 87–88, with 4:38 remaining.

=== Game 2 ===
Vintage

August 23

Presto Tivolis 124, Purefoods Hotdogs 125
Scoring by quarter: 30–30, 30–30, 29–41, 35–24
Pts: Gerald Esplana 31 Allan Caidic 29	Pts: Jojo Lastimosa 28
Series tied, 1–1

The ULTRA, Pasig

In the third period, the Hotdogs with Jack Tanuan playing quality minutes and relieving Jerry Codinera, took a commanding 21-point lead several times with the last at 97–76, Gerry Esplana and Allan Caidic rallied the Tivolis back in the game and were only down by 12 going into the fourth quarter. Presto looks set for a come-from-behind win and a 2–0 series advantage after Caidic put the Tivolis ahead, 124–123, with five seconds remaining and Esplana broke up a fastbreak by the Hotdogs with two second left. Presto coach Jimmy Mariano committed the biggest blunder of the series by calling a timeout on the Hotdogs' possession, allowing them to regroup despite having no more timeouts. On the Hotdogs' inbound play, Jerry Codinera fielded a wayward inbound pass and converted at the buzzer.

=== Game 3 ===
Vintage

August 26

Presto Tivolis 115, Purefoods Hotdogs 111
Pts: Allan Caidic 31
Presto leads series, 2–1

The ULTRA, Pasig

Purefoods choke anew at the stretch as it gave up a 15-point lead in the second quarter. The Tivolis got a big lift for the second time from Arnie Tuadles, who completed a three-point play and score a field goal to convert a 107–110 deficit into a 112–110 edge with 22 seconds left to play. The Hotdogs lost its chance to score in the next play when Nelson Asaytono bungled an inbound pass.

=== Game 4 ===
Vintage

August 28

Presto Tivolis 123, Purefoods Hotdogs 139
Scoring by quarter: 30–27, 27–35, 31–38, 35–39
Pts: Allan Caidic 32
Series tied, 2–2

The ULTRA, Pasig

The Hotdogs padded their lead to 100–88 at the end of the third quarter as Bernie Fabiosa took over Dindo Pumaren's playmaking chores for 20 quality minutes. Allan Caidic managed to score 32 points, including six triples, but for a moment lost his temper on the face of Glenn Capacio's leech-like guarding. Purefoods outrebounded Presto, 50–31.

=== Game 5 ===
Vintage

August 30

Presto Tivolis 123, Purefoods Hotdogs 119
Scoring by quarter: 36–28, 22–31, 34–38, 31–22
Pts: Allan Caidic 42
Presto leads series, 3–2

The ULTRA, Pasig

Experience once again took over for Presto in the decisive last six minutes as coach Jimmy Mariano fielded in Willie Generalao, who quarterbacked the Tivolis' stirring offensive as they outscored the Hotdogs, 14–6. Abe King smothered two attempts by Alvin Patrimonio in that telling stretch and soared high for a tip-in that gave Presto a 116–113 lead, going into the last three minutes of the game.

=== Game 6 ===
Vintage

September 2

Presto Tivolis 117, Purefoods Hotdogs 128
Scoring by quarter: 25–31, 24–32, 24–32, 44–33
Pts: Gerald Esplana 25	Pts: Alvin Patrimonio 27
Series tied, 3–3

The ULTRA, Pasig

Purefoods raced to a 21–6 lead early and took the half at 63–49. A triple by Al Solis during the third quarter started a 9–0 run that gave the Hotdogs their biggest lead of 27 points at 80–53, the closest the Tivolis came within was 14 points early in the fourth period at 96–82, Jojo Lastimosa quickly scored on a jumper and a 7–0 blast put the Hotdogs on top by 21 points, 103–82.

=== Game 7 ===
Vintage

September 4

Presto Tivolis 115, Purefoods Hotdogs 96
Scoring by quarter: 19–16, 24–19, 30–24, 42–37
Pts: Arnie Tuadles 33	Pts: Jojo Lastimosa 22
Presto wins series, 4–3

The ULTRA, Pasig

The final game of the series, the odds were stacked in favor of Purefoods to win the All-Filipino title as Presto Tivolis were faced with a tough task of playing without its number one gunner, Allan Caidic. In Game Six, Caidic injured his left hand while trying to ballhawk off Glenn Capacio. Before that unfortunate incident, Caidic was averaging 29 points a game in the titular series. Right from the opening buzzer, the Tivolis allowed the Hotdogs to take the lead only once at 4–3 when a 10–0 burst gave Presto a nine-point spread at 13–4. From a 19–19 standoff, Arnie Tuadles and Onchie dela Cruz combined in a searing breakaway to give Presto a 42–27 lead en route to a 43–35 halftime advantage.

Successive triples by Naning Valenciano and Glenn Capacio cut the Tivolis' lead to four early in the third quarter, 45–49, but Abe King, Arnie Tuadles and Willie Generalao sparked another scoring salvo that made it a 16-point bulge, 67–51, with 2:56 left in the third. The Hotdogs tried to employ a trapping fullcourt press, the ploy only got them to within nine points, 71–80, as the Tivolis couldn't seem to do anything wrong on the offensive end of the floor. Arnie Tuadles was picture-perfect in scoring a game-high 33 points before fouling out with 3:57 remaining, Presto up by 15 points, 95–80, Manny Victorino capitalized on the loss of Purefoods center Jerry Codinera, who saw action for only seven minutes after having tested positive for viral hepatitis, Jack Tanuan and Gido Babilonia were dismal flops in Game Seven as they tried to fill in the shoes of Codinera, while Nelson Asaytono couldn't get his game going and was limited to only three points on 1-of-8 shooting from the field.

1990 PBA All Filipino Conference Champions

Presto Tivolis
Sixth title

== Rosters ==
Presto Tivolis roster
Players
Coaches

Pos.	No.	Nat.	Name	Ht.	Wt.
C	1	(Philippines)	Manny Victorino	6 ft 5 in (1.96 m)		José Rizal
G	5	(Philippines)	Peter Jao	6 ft 0 in (1.83 m)		USJ–R
F	6	(Philippines)	Abe King	6 ft 3 in (1.91 m)		San Beda
F	8	(Philippines)	Allan Caidic	6 ft 2 in (1.88 m)		UE
G	9	(Philippines)	Onchie Dela Cruz	5 ft 11 in (1.80 m)		Philippine Christian
F	11	(Philippines)	Arnie Tuadles	6 ft 2 in (1.88 m)		Visayas
G	14	(Philippines)	Gerry Esplana	5 ft 9 in (1.75 m)		Far Eastern
C	15	(Philippines)	Hernani Demigillo	6 ft 5 in (1.96 m)		San Sebastian
F	17	(Philippines)	Padim Israel	6 ft 2 in (1.88 m)		Ateneo
C	28	(Philippines)	Zaldy Realubit	6 ft 5 in (1.96 m)		USJ–R
F	29	(Philippines)	Bernardo Carpio	6 ft 3 in (1.91 m)		Ateneo
G	42	(Philippines)	Willie Generalao	5 ft 8 in (1.73 m)		Visayas
F	71	(Philippines)	Manuel Marquez	6 ft 2 in (1.88 m)		San Beda

Head coach

- (Philippines) Jimmy Mariano

Assistant coach(es)

- (Philippines) Bong Go

Legend

- (C) Team captain
- Injured

Purefoods Hotdogs roster
Players
Coaches

Pos.	No.	Nat.	Name	Ht.	Wt.
C	5	(Philippines)	Gido Babilonia	6 ft 6 in (1.98 m)		UST
G	6	(Philippines)	Jojo Lastimosa	6 ft 1 in (1.85 m)		USJ–R
G	7	(Philippines)	Arturo Cristobal	6 ft 1 in (1.85 m)		Far Eastern
G	8	(Philippines)	Al Solis	5 ft 11 in (1.80 m)		Visayas
F	9	(Philippines)	Naning Valenciano	6 ft 1 in (1.85 m)		USLS
G	10	(Philippines)	Dindo Pumaren	5 ft 9 in (1.75 m)		De La Salle
F	11	(Philippines)	Nelson Asaytono	6 ft 3 in (1.91 m)		Manila
G	12	(Philippines)	Glenn Capacio	6 ft 1 in (1.85 m)		Far Eastern
C	14	(Philippines)	Jack Tanuan	6 ft 6 in (1.98 m)		Far Eastern
G	15	(Philippines)	Bernie Fabiosa	5 ft 9 in (1.75 m)		UE
F	16	(Philippines)	Alvin Patrimonio	6 ft 3 in (1.91 m)		Mapúa
C	44	(Philippines)	Jerry Codinera	6 ft 5 in (1.96 m)		UE

Head coach

- (Philippines) Baby Dalupan

Assistant coach(es)

- (Philippines) Ely Capacio
- (Philippines) Cris Calilan

Legend

- (C) Team captain
- Injured

== Broadcast notes ==
Game	Play-by-play	Analyst
Game 1		
Game 2		
Game 3		
Game 4		
Game 5		
Game 6		
Game 7	Joe Cantada	Andy Jao
