= 1992 PBA Third Conference finals =

Team	Coach	Wins
Swift Mighty Meaty Hotdogs	Yeng Guiao	4
7-Up Uncolas	Derrick Pumaren	0
- Dates: December 6–13, 1992
- Television: Vintage Sports (PTV)
- Radio network: DZAM

PBA Third Conference finals chronology
- < 1991

PBA finals chronology
- < 1992 All-Filipino 1993 All-Filipino >

The 1992 PBA Third Conference finals was the best-of-7 basketball championship series of the 1992 PBA Third Conference, and the conclusion of the conference playoffs. Swift Mighty Meaty Hotdogs and 7-Up Uncolas played for the 53rd championship contested by the league.

Swift Mighty Meaty Hotdogs won their first PBA title with a 4–0 sweep over 7-Up Uncolas, becoming only the second team to score a sweep in a best-of-seven championship series.

== Qualification ==
Swift		7-Up
Finished 9–2 (.818), 1st	Eliminations	Finished 7–4 (.636), tied for 2nd
Finished 14–5 (.737), 1st	Semifinals	Finished 12–7 (.632), 2nd
Finished 14–5 (.737), 1st	Playoff	Won against San Miguel, 102–91

== Series scoring summary ==
Team	Game 1	Game 2	Game 3	Game 4	Wins
Swift	121	101	125	119	4
Seven-Up	109	97	107	106	0
Venue	PSC-NAS	PSC-NAS	PSC-NAS	PSC-NAS

== Games summary ==
=== Game 1 ===
Vintage

December 6

Swift Mighty Meaty Hotdogs 121, 7-Up Uncolas 109
Scoring by quarter: 33–23, 24–28, 30–20, 34–38
Pts: Tony Harris 31 Nelson Asaytono 28

The NASA, Pasig

Nelson Asaytono, Al Solis and Ricric Marata combined for 59 points to take over from a shackled Tony Harris, who was limited to his lowest output of the conference with only 31 points. The Meaties were never seriously threatened after a hot third period in which they outscored Seven-Up, 14–8 in a span of four minutes to seize a 71–59 lead.

=== Game 2 ===
Vintage

December 8

Swift Mighty Meaty Hotdogs 101, 7-Up Uncolas 97
Pts: Tony Harris 49

The NASA, Pasig

Tony Harris pumped in all but two of Swift's 23 points in the final period to salvaged a win. Harris capped his game with six straight points in the last 55 seconds to outlast the entire Seven-Up crew.

=== Game 3 ===
Vintage

December 10

Swift Mighty Meaty Hotdogs 125, 7-Up Uncolas 107
Scoring by quarter: 32–31, 35–32, 31–26, 27–18
Pts: Tony Harris 49	Pts: Dell Demps 36

The NASA, Pasig

Swift broke the game apart in the third quarter under a 21-point barrage in a stretch of eight minutes to forge ahead at 88–75. Seven-Up could only come closest at 87–98, before falling back as many as 18 points, 91–109. The Meaties' local starters; Jack Tanuan, Nelson Asaytono, Rudy Distrito and Al Solis combined for 63 points while Tony Harris scored 49 points.

=== Game 4 ===
Vintage

December 13

Swift Mighty Meaty Hotdogs 119, 7-Up Uncolas 106
Scoring by quarter: 21–25, 38–20, 33–24, 27–37
Pts: Tony Harris 58	Pts: Dell Demps 42
Swift wins series, 4–0

The NASA, Pasig

Seven-Up led at the end of the first quarter at 25–21, but the Meaties outscored them, 38–20 in the second period to take a 59–45 halftime lead. It was all Swift in the last 24 minutes of play as Tony Harris dominated, finishing with a triple-double of 58 points, 19 rebounds and 12 assists in a fitting finale on the last playing day of the PBA at the ULTRA.

1992 PBA Third Conference Champions

Swift Mighty Meaty Hotdogs
First title

== Rosters ==
Swift Mighty Meaties roster
Players
Coaches

Pos.	No.	Nat.	Name	Ht.	Wt.
G	8	(Philippines)	Al Solis	5 ft 11 in (1.80 m)		Visayas
F	10	(Philippines)	Eric Reyes	6 ft 4 in (1.93 m)		Ateneo
F	11	(Philippines)	Nelson Asaytono	6 ft 3 in (1.91 m)		Manila
C	12	(Philippines)	Bonel Balingit	6 ft 9 in (2.06 m)		Visayas
F	13	(Philippines)	Elpidio Villamin	6 ft 2 in (1.88 m)
G	14	(Philippines)	Rudy Distrito	5 ft 11 in (1.80 m)		UE
G	15	(Philippines)	Juancho Estrada	5 ft 11 in (1.80 m)		Adamson
F	17	(Philippines)	Terry Saldaña	6 ft 3 in (1.91 m)		Letran
G/F	22	(United States)	Tony Harris (I)	6 ft 2 in (1.88 m)		LSU New Orleans
G	23	(Philippines)	Ric-Ric Marata	5 ft 8 in (1.73 m)		Southwestern-U
F	24	(Philippines)	Richard Bognot	6 ft 4 in (1.93 m)
F	26	(Philippines)	Andy De Guzman	6 ft 2 in (1.88 m)		Far Eastern
C	41	(Philippines)	Jack Tanuan	6 ft 5 in (1.96 m)		Far Eastern

Head coach

- (Philippines) Yeng Guiao

Assistant coach(es)

- (Philippines) Roehl Nadurata

Legend

- (C) Team captain
- (I) Import
- Injured

7-Up Uncolas roster
Players
Coaches

Pos.	No.	Nat.	Name	Ht.	Wt.
C	1	(Philippines)	Manny Victorino	6 ft 5 in (1.96 m)		José Rizal
C	4	(Philippines)	Peter Aguilar	6 ft 5 in (1.96 m)		TUA
G/F	5	(United States)	Dell Demps (I)	6 ft 3 in (1.91 m)		Pacific
G	7	(Philippines)	Eugene Quilban	5 ft 7 in (1.70 m)		San Sebastian
F	9	(Philippines)	Naning Valenciano	6 ft 2 in (1.88 m)		USLS
G	10	(Philippines)	Roberto Jabar	6 ft 0 in (1.83 m)		Southwestern-U
G	11	(Philippines)	Mark Tallo	5 ft 6 in (1.68 m)		Southwestern-U
G	13	(Philippines)	Leo Austria	5 ft 11 in (1.80 m)		Lyceum
F	22	(Philippines)	Alejo Alolor	6 ft 1 in (1.85 m)		Visayas
C	25	(Philippines)	Gido Babilonia	6 ft 6 in (1.98 m)		UST
F	29	(Philippines)	Bernardo Carpio	6 ft 3 in (1.91 m)		Ateneo
C	32	(Philippines)	Abet Guidaben	6 ft 5 in (1.96 m)		USJ–R
F	50	(Philippines)	Nap Hatton	6 ft 1 in (1.85 m)		San Sebastian

Head coach

- (Philippines) Derrick Pumaren

Assistant coach(es)

- (Philippines) Gabby Velasco

Legend

- (C) Team captain
- (I) Import
- Injured

== Broadcast notes ==
Game	Play-by-play	Analyst
Game 1	Sev Sarmenta	Andy Jao
Game 2	Ed Picson	Quinito Henson
Game 3	Sev Sarmenta	Andy Jao
Game 4	Ed Picson	Quinito Henson
