= 1990 PBA Third Conference finals =

Team	Coach	Wins
Purefoods Hotdogs	Baby Dalupan	3
Alaska Air Force	Tim Cone	2
- Dates: December 11–20, 1990
- Television: Vintage Sports (PTV)
- Radio network: DZAM

PBA Third Conference finals chronology
- 1991 >

PBA finals chronology
- < 1990 All-Filipino 1991 First Conference >

The 1990 PBA Third Conference finals was the best-of-5 championship series of the 1990 PBA Third Conference, and the conclusion of the conference's playoffs. The Purefoods Hotdogs and Alaska Milkmen played for the 47th championship contested by the league and are both gunning for their first PBA crown.

Purefoods Hotdogs finally wins their first PBA title in three years of participation, overcame a 0–2 series deficit against Alaska Milkmen to win the final three games, duplicating the feat achieved by the famed Crispa Redmanizers in 1976, as coach Baby Dalupan won his 15th championship.

== Qualification ==
Alaska		Purefoods
Finished 8–2 (.800), 1st	Eliminations	Finished 6–4 (.600), tied for 3rd
Finished 12–6 (.667), 1st	Semifinals	Finished 11–7 (.611), tied for 2nd (with two other teams)
Finished 12–6 (.667), 1st	Playoff	Won against Shell, 121–101

== Series scoring summary ==
Team	Game 1	Game 2	Game 3	Game 4	Game 5	Wins
Purefoods	103	112	117	104	99	3
Alaska	105	118	103	99	98	2
Venue	ULTRA	ULTRA	ULTRA	ULTRA	ULTRA

== Games summary ==
=== Game 1 ===
Vintage

December 11

Purefoods Hotdogs 103, Alaska Air Force 105
Scoring by quarter: 25–23, 18–21, 35–30, 25–31
Pts: Daren Queenan 28
Alaska leads series, 1–0

The ULTRA, Pasig, Metro Manila

Paul Alvarez' heroics on a driving layup with two seconds left gave Alaska a two-point victory, the Hotdogs slowly work their way from a 94–100 deficit, Al Solis' triple cut the lead to one and Daren Queenan's two free throws tied the count at 103-all with less than 15 seconds remaining. The Milkmen's chances dimmed early as ace guard Frankie Lim twisted his left ankle barely 11 seconds into the series opener.

=== Game 2 ===
Vintage

December 13

Purefoods Hotdogs 112, Alaska Air Force 118
Pts: Daren Queenan 43	Pts: Sean Chambers 46
Alaska leads series, 2–0

The ULTRA, Pasig, Metro Manila

Purefoods led by seven points, 89–82, going into the final quarter. When the score was at 106–99 in Hotdogs' favor, Elmer Cabahug nailed a three-pointer that started a 9–0 run for Alaska to grab the upper hand at 108–106. The Hotdogs on a verge of another last minute collapse and were down by three, 109–112, when import Robert Rose drive hard to the basket and scored plus a foul, he fell on his back and crash to the floor. Rose completed a three-point play to tie the count at 112-all, after Sean Chambers put Alaska on top, 114–112, Paul Alvarez again played the hero's role when he intercept a Purefoods inbound pass with only 17 seconds remaining in the game, the Hotdogs had two chances to send the game into overtime with Alaska leading, 115–112, but missed on two hurriedly three-point attempts with a second left, a frustrated Daren Queenan was given a technical foul and was thrown out of the game.

=== Game 3 ===
Vintage

December 16

Purefoods Hotdogs 117, Alaska Air Force 103
Scoring by quarter: 22–28, 34–19, 32–26, 29–30
Pts: Robert Rose 29
Alaska leads series, 2–1

The ULTRA, Pasig, Metro Manila

Alaska led 17–8 early and 28–22 at the end of the first quarter. Purefoods turned it around in the second period; a buzzer-beating dunk by Nelson Asaytono off a steal on the inbound play gave the Hotdogs a 56–47 advantage at halftime. Purefoods padded the lead to 15 points in the third quarter. The Milkmen lost Paul Alvarez with a torn Achilles tendon and will be out of the series.

=== Game 4 ===
Vintage

December 18

Purefoods Hotdogs 104, Alaska Air Force 99 (OT)
Scoring by quarter: 24–26, 22–23, 27–18, 22–28, Overtime: 9–4
Pts: Daren Queenan 44; Rebs: Queenan 16	Pts: Sean Chambers 37; Rebs: Chambers 14
Series tied, 2–2

The ULTRA, Pasig, Metro Manila

Alaska dictated the tempo early, enjoying leads as nine, the last at 22–13 in the first quarter, but Alvin Patrimonio and Daren Queenan blended well inside the paint to get Purefoods to within, 46–49 at the half. The Hotdogs led by nine, early in the fourth at 76–67. Purefoods almost had the game won in regulation when they led, 93–87, going into the last two minutes when back-to-back three-pointers by Elmer Cabahug tied the count at 93-all with 1:16 left, Patrimonio shoved the Hotdogs back on top, 95–93, but Carlos Clark retaliated to knot the count anew at 95-all, time down to 34 seconds, misses from Daren Queenan and Jojo Lastimosa, the last one on ill-advised three-pointer with five seconds to go, paved the way for the extra period. Purefoods limited Alaska to only four points in overtime, starting off with two quick baskets from Robert Rose and one from Queenan to give the Hotdogs a 101–95 lead. Sean Chambers countered with four points of his own to narrow the gap, 99–101, but that was to be the last point scored by the Milkmen as Purefoods blanked Alaska in the last 1:43. Dindo Pumaren stole the ball from a dribbling Carlos Clark with 22 seconds left, the Hotdogs leading, 103–99.

=== Game 5 ===
Vintage

December 20

Purefoods Hotdogs 99, Alaska Air Force 98
Scoring by quarter: 20–18, 23–26, 35–30, 21–24
Pts: Daren Queenan 40	Pts: Sean Chambers 31
Purefoods wins series, 3–2

The ULTRA, Pasig, Metro Manila

Down 27–29, Nelson Asaytono spearheaded an 8–0 blast that gave the Hotdogs the lead, 35–29, Sean Chambers went on a scoring spree late in the second period to put the Milkmen back on top at the half, 44–43, Robert Rose saw action for only 17 minutes because of a sprained ankle that bothered him, he was taken out with still 10:22 left in the third period and accounted for only two points. Alaska controlled the tempo early in the second half, enjoying leads as much as seven points four times, the last at 58–51, before a 12–4 bomb was dropped by Purefoods to wrest the upper hand, 63–62, Alaska center Dong Polistico was thrown out of the game for committing a punching foul on a driving Daren Queenan, Alvin Patrimonio went after Polistico and both benches emptied in a near free-for-all. Purefoods built a 78–71 lead late in the third quarter but Alaska's defense limited the Hotdogs to only eight points in the first six minutes of the final period, the Milkmen went up, 89–86, on the heads up play of Sean Chambers but Queenan countered with eight straight points, starting off with a triple in an 8–2 run to give the Hotdogs a 94–91 lead with three minutes left, with 14 seconds to go and two seconds left in their shotclock, Al Solis buried a three-pointer that gave Purefoods a 99–95 advantage. A timeout was called by Alaska and on an inbound play, Frankie Lim responded immediately with his own triple to narrow the gap, 98–99, time down to eight seconds. The Milkmen were not yet in penalty situation and tried to go for a steal in every Purefoods inbound, fouling the recipient of the inbound to stop the clock, five times they tried and failed, handing the Hotdogs their first championship in three years of participation in the league.

1990 PBA Third Conference Champions

Purefoods Hotdogs
First title

== Rosters ==
Purefoods Hotdogs roster
Players

Pos.	#	POB	Name	Height	Weight	DOB (YYYY–MM–DD)	From
C	5	(Philippines)	Gido Babilonia	6 ft 6 in (1.98 m)			UST
G	6	(Philippines)	Jojo Lastimosa	6 ft 1 in (1.85 m)			USJ–R
G	7	(Philippines)	Arturo Cristobal	6 ft 1 in (1.85 m)			Far Eastern
G	8	(Philippines)	Al Solis	5 ft 11 in (1.80 m)			Visayas
F	9	(Philippines)	Naning Valenciano	6 ft 1 in (1.85 m)			USLS
G	10	(Philippines)	Dindo Pumaren	5 ft 9 in (1.75 m)			De La Salle
F	11	(Philippines)	Nelson Asaytono	6 ft 3 in (1.91 m)			Manila
G	12	(Philippines)	Glenn Capacio	6 ft 1 in (1.85 m)			Far Eastern
C	14	(Philippines)	Jack Tanuan	6 ft 6 in (1.98 m)			Far Eastern
G	15	(Philippines)	Bernie Fabiosa	5 ft 9 in (1.75 m)			UE
F	16	(Philippines)	Alvin Patrimonio	6 ft 3 in (1.91 m)			Mapúa
F	24	(United States)	Daren Queenan (I)	6 ft 4 in (1.93 m)			Lehigh
F	33	(United States)	Robert Rose (I)	6 ft 5 in (1.96 m)			George Mason
C	44	(Philippines)	Jerry Codinera	6 ft 5 in (1.96 m)			UE

Coaches

Head coach

- (Philippines) Baby Dalupan

Assistant coach(es)

- (Philippines) Ely Capacio
- (Philippines) Cris Calilan

Legend

- (C) Team captain
- (I) Import
- Injured

Alaska Milkmen roster
Players

Pos.	#	POB	Name	Height	Weight	DOB (YYYY–MM–DD)	From
F/C	4	(United States)	Carlos Clark (I)	6 ft 5 in (1.96 m)			Mississippi
G	6	(Philippines)	Biboy Ravanes	6 ft 0 in (1.83 m)			Cebu
G	9	(Philippines)	Boy Cabahug	5 ft 11 in (1.80 m)			Visayas
C	10	(Philippines)	Adriano Polistico	6 ft 7 in (2.01 m)			Letran
G	11	(Philippines)	Eric Altamirano (injured)	5 ft 9 in (1.75 m)			UP Diliman
F	13	(Philippines)	Elpidio Villamin	6 ft 3 in (1.91 m)
F/C	16	(Philippines)	Macario Torres	6 ft 4 in (1.93 m)			Far Eastern
G/F	20	(United States)	Sean Chambers (I)	6 ft 1 in (1.85 m)			Cal Poly
F	21	(Philippines)	Paul Alvarez	6 ft 0 in (1.83 m)			San Sebastian
G	22	(Philippines)	Frankie Lim	5 ft 10 in (1.78 m)			San Beda
G	23	(Philippines)	Ric-Ric Marata	5 ft 8 in (1.73 m)			Southwestern-U
F	31	(Philippines)	Harmon Codinera	6 ft 3 in (1.91 m)			Far Eastern

Coaches

Head coach

- (United States) Tim Cone

Assistant coach(es)

- (Philippines) Chot Reyes

Legend

- (C) Team captain
- (I) Import
- Injured

== Broadcast notes ==
Game	Play-by-play	Analyst
Game 1		
Game 2		
Game 3		
Game 4		
Game 5	Joe Cantada	Andy Jao
