= Nic Jorge =

Filipino basketball coach (1941–2020)

Personal information
- Born: November 27, 1941 Manila, Philippine Commonwealth
- Died: June 13, 2020 (aged 78) Iloilo City

Career information
- College: UP

Career history

Coaching
- 1960s: UP
- 1978: Philippines
- 1981–1982: CDCP Road Builders
- 1983: Manhattan Shirtmakers
- 1983: Singapore
- 1997–1999: UP
- 2000–2001: Mapua

Nicanor Fortich Jorge Jr. (November 27, 1941 – June 13, 2020) was a Filipino basketball coach who has led the Philippines and Singapore men's national teams. He is also the founder of the Best Center, a sports training institution which has produced several national team and professional players.

== Early life and education ==
Nicanor Fortich Jorge Jr. was born on November 27, 1941, in Manila. He studied at the University of the Philippines Diliman where he took a BSE degree in physical education. He also played for the UP Fighting Maroons, with his performance helping him secure a tenure as coach of the collegiate team.

== Coaching career ==
Jorge started his coaching career in the 1960s when he became head coach of the UP basketball team at age 21. In 1994, Jorge led the Maroons to a third-place finish.

Jorge has also served as a head coach for several Philippine Basketball Association teams. In the 1980 season, he coached the Galleon Shippers (which renamed itself as the CDCP Road Builders) until its disbandment before the 1982 season. For the 1983 season, Jorge coached the Manhattan Shirtmakers in the All-Filipino Conference.

He returned to coaching the UP Fighting Maroons succeeding, Eric Altamirano and coached the team from 1997 to 1999. In 1997 he led the collegiate team to a Final Four finish.

=== International career ===
Jorge coached the national team which played at the 1978 FIBA World Championship and the 1978 Asian Games. Jorge also led the Singapore national team at the 1983 Southeast Asian Games.

== Sports administration ==
Jorge was Secretary General of the Basketball Association of the Philippines (BAP) in the 1980s, which was the governing body for basketball in the Philippines until its replacement by the Samahang Basketbol ng Pilipinas (SBP). He also played a role in the SBP's grassroots program.

== Best Center ==
Nic Jorge is credited with founding the Best Center, a sports training center in 1978. The center has produced several national team and professional basketball players including, Jerry Codiñera, Jun Limpot, Benjie Paras, Kiefer Ravena, and Chris Tiu.

== Coaching record ==
=== Collegiate record ===
Season	Team	Eliminations				Playoffs				
Season	Team	W	L	PCT	Finish	PG	W	L	PCT	Results
UP Fighting Maroons (UAAP)
1997	UP	8	6	.571	4th	2	1	1	.500	Semifinals.
1998	UP	7	7	.500	5th	1	0	1	.000	4th-seed playoff.
1999	UP	5	9	.357	6th	—	—	—	—	Eliminated
Mapua Cardinals (NCAA)
2000	MIT	5	9	.357	5th	—	—	—	—	Eliminated
2001	MIT	9	5	.643	3rd	2	1	1	.500	Semifinals.
Totals		34	36	.485		5	2	3	.400	0 championships

== Death ==
Jorge died in his sleep on June 13, 2020, in Iloilo City.

== Personal life ==
Jorge was married to Marilyn with whom he had three children.
