= Capacio =

Capacio is a surname. Notable people with the surname include:

- Ely Capacio (1955–2014), Filipino basketball player, coach, and executive
- Glenn Capacio (born 1964), Filipino basketball player and coach, brother of Ely
