= 1991 PBA All-Filipino Conference finals =

Basketball cup finals

Team	Coach	Wins
Purefoods TJ Hotdogs	Ely Capacio	3
Diet Sarsi Sizzlers	Yeng Guiao	2
- Dates: August 22 – September 1, 1991
- Television: Vintage Sports (PTV)
- Radio network: DZAM

PBA All-Filipino Conference finals chronology
- < 1990 1992 >

PBA finals chronology
- < 1991 First 1991 Third >

The 1991 PBA All-Filipino Conference finals was the best-of-5 basketball championship series of the 1991 PBA All-Filipino Conference, and the conclusion of the conference's playoffs. The Purefoods Tender Juicy Hotdogs and Diet Sarsi Sizzlers played for the 49th championship contested by the league, resulting in the Purefoods Tender Juicy Hotdogs's first All-Filipino crown and their second PBA title.

== Qualification ==
Purefoods		Diet Sarsi
Finished 7–4 (.636), 2nd	Eliminations	Finished 8–3 (.727), 1st
Finished 12–7 (.632), tied for 1st	Semifinals	Finished 12–7 (.632), tied for 1st
Finished 12–7 (.632), tied for 1st	Playoff	Won against San Miguel, 100–95

Purefoods dropped their first two games in the semifinals, then won five of their next six outings to finish in tie with Diet Sarsi at 12–7. The Tender Juicy Hotdogs make it to the finals first by a superior quotient over the Sizzlers despite a 2–1 edge by Diet Sarsi in their three meetings with the Hotdogs in the conference.

Diet Sarsi had to win their last outing in the semifinals against Alaska to avoid a possible three-way tie at second along with San Miguel. The Sizzlers defeated the Beermen, which finish with an 11–8 card and won five games in the semifinals, in a playoff for the right to play Purefoods in the finals.

== Series scoring summary ==
Team	Game 1	Game 2	Game 3	Game 4	Game 5	Wins
Purefoods	107	112	105	115	107	3
Diet Sarsi	111	102	109	105	100	2
Venue	ULTRA	ULTRA	ULTRA	ULTRA	ULTRA

== Games summary ==
=== Game 1 ===
Vintage

August 22
7:30 pm

Purefoods TJ Hotdogs 107, Diet Sarsi Sizzlers 111
Scoring by quarter: 31–26, 17–25, 36–28, 23–32
Pts: Jerry Codiñera 23	Pts: Alfonso Solis 28
Diet Sarsi leads series, 1–0

The ULTRA, Pasig, Metro Manila

The Sizzlers were down by as much as 13 points in the third quarter. Purefoods coach Ely Capacio fielded in only seven players which resulted to early foul troubles of his first five. Sonny Cabatu shackled Alvin Patrimonio, limiting him to only 15 points. Diet Sarsi grabbed the lead, 105–103, on a triple by Ricric Marata. Jack Tanuan scored on a difficult baseline drive in the closing seconds and Al Solis sank two free throws to squeeze out the win.

=== Game 2 ===
Vintage

August 25
6:30 pm

Purefoods TJ Hotdogs 112, Diet Sarsi Sizzlers 102
Scoring by quarter: 22–26, 31–20, 16–26, 43–30
Pts: Jerry Codiñera 22 Alvin Patrimonio 22	Pts: Andy De Guzman 25
Series tied, 1–1

The ULTRA, Pasig, Metro Manila

Diet Sarsi took the first quarter at 26–22, but the Hotdogs came through with a 20–3 blast in the second period to open a 42–29 advantage. Andy De Guzman, who's been the Sizzlers' top gunner for the second straight game, scored on a buzzer-beating triple to close the gap, 46–53 at halftime. Purefoods scored 11 straight points at the start of the third period to posted an 18-point lead, 64–46, the Sizzlers again rallied to take the upper hand, 68–67, and were up by three points entering the fourth quarter. Alvin Patrimonio, staying out of foul trouble, reasserted his might and put on a one-man show as the Hotdogs pulled away, 88–76, on a 10–0 run.

=== Game 3 ===
Vintage

August 27
7:30 pm

Purefoods TJ Hotdogs 105, Diet Sarsi Sizzlers 109
Scoring by quarter: 24–20, 27–29, 25–28, 29–32
Pts: Alvin Patrimonio 23 Boy Cabahug 23	Pts: Alfonso Solis 29
Diet Sarsi leads series, 2–1

The ULTRA, Pasig, Metro Manila

Jack Tanuan and Al Solis once again played big in the crucial stretches, Tanuan scored with their shotclock winding down, giving the Sizzlers a 105–101 edge, from the game's last deadlock at 100-all. Al Solis drive through the hoop for a 107–103 lead for Diet Sarsi with less than a minute left.

=== Game 4 ===
Vintage

August 29
6:15 pm

Purefoods TJ Hotdogs 115, Diet Sarsi Sizzlers 105
Scoring by quarter: 22–17, 33–30, 27–28, 33–30
Pts: Alvin Patrimonio 29	Pts: Andy De Guzman 22
Series tied, 2–2

The ULTRA, Pasig, Metro Manila

Purefoods raced to a 14-point lead, 80–66 in the third quarter, the Sizzlers threatened to within four points twice in the fourth period, the last at 84–88. The Hotdogs countered with eight unanswered points to put the game out of reach, 96–84.

=== Game 5 ===
Vintage

September 1
6:15 pm

Purefoods TJ Hotdogs 107, Diet Sarsi Sizzlers 100
Scoring by quarter: 23–26, 30–30, 34–27, 20–17
Pts: Glenn Capacio 20	Pts: Andy De Guzman 22 Alfonso Solis 22
Purefoods wins series, 3–2

The ULTRA, Pasig, Metro Manila

Diet Sarsi took control of the first two quarters, leads by as much nine at 32–23, early in the second period, the championship pressure began to hit the Sizzlers in the fourth quarter as the team missed seven of their free throws, the Hotdogs went up, 99–91, but five straight points put the Sizzlers to within 96–99, going into the last two minutes. Glenn Capacio converted on a jumper for a 101–96 count, on the next play, Jack Tanuan misses at close range in a very crucial play, with the score at 102–98 for Purefoods with 51 seconds remaining and possession for the Sizzlers, Dindo Pumaren stole the ball from Al Solis, the Hotdogs had a six-point cushion, 104–98, with 33 seconds left.

1991 PBA All Filipino Conference Champions

Purefoods Tender Juicy Hotdogs
Second title

== Rosters ==
Purefoods TJ Hotdogs roster
Players
Coaches

Pos.	No.	Nat.	Name	Ht.	Wt.
F	4	(Philippines)	Elmer Reyes	6 ft 1 in (1.85 m)		San Beda
G	9	(Philippines)	Boy Cabahug	5 ft 11 in (1.80 m)		Visayas
G	10	(Philippines)	Dindo Pumaren	5 ft 9 in (1.75 m)		De La Salle
F	11	(Philippines)	Nelson Asaytono	6 ft 3 in (1.91 m)		Manila
G	12	(Philippines)	Glenn Capacio	6 ft 1 in (1.85 m)		Far Eastern
F	15	(Philippines)	Joey Santamaria	6 ft 3 in (1.91 m)		De La Salle
F	16	(Philippines)	Alvin Patrimonio	6 ft 3 in (1.91 m)		Mapúa
G	17	(Philippines)	Leoncio Tan	6 ft 0 in (1.83 m)		De La Salle
G	24	(Philippines)	Rudy Enterina	6 ft 0 in (1.83 m)		Visayas
F/C	31	(Philippines)	Harmon Codinera	6 ft 4 in (1.93 m)		Far Eastern
C	44	(Philippines)	Jerry Codinera	6 ft 5 in (1.96 m)		UE

Head coach

- (Philippines) Ely Capacio

Assistant coach(es)

- (Philippines) Cris Calilan

Legend

- (C) Team captain
- Injured

Diet Sarsi roster
Players
Coaches

Pos.	No.	Nat.	Name	Ht.	Wt.
C	5	(Philippines)	Sonny Cabatu	6 ft 5 in (1.96 m)		PSBA
F	6	(Philippines)	Ricardo Cui	6 ft 3 in (1.91 m)		Lyceum
G	7	(Philippines)	Edgar Macaraya	6 ft 0 in (1.83 m)		San Sebastian
G	8	(Philippines)	Al Solis	5 ft 11 in (1.80 m)		Visayas
F	13	(Philippines)	Elpidio Villamin	6 ft 2 in (1.88 m)
G	14	(Philippines)	Joey Loyzaga	6 ft 1 in (1.85 m)		San Beda
F	17	(Philippines)	Terry Saldaña	6 ft 3 in (1.91 m)		Letran
G	23	(Philippines)	Ric-Ric Marata	5 ft 8 in (1.73 m)		Southwestern-U
G	25	(Philippines)	Pido Jarencio	5 ft 10 in (1.78 m)		UST
F	26	(Philippines)	Andy De Guzman	6 ft 2 in (1.88 m)		Far Eastern
C	41	(Philippines)	Jack Tanuan	6 ft 5 in (1.96 m)		Far Eastern
G	51	(Philippines)	Bernie Fabiosa	5 ft 8 in (1.73 m)		UE

Head coach

- (Philippines) Yeng Guiao

Assistant coach(es)

- (Philippines) Roehl Nadurata

Legend

- (C) Team captain
- Injured

== Broadcast notes ==
Game	Play-by-play	Analyst
Game 1		
Game 2		
Game 3		
Game 4		
Game 5		
