= Benjie Paras =

Filipino basketball player

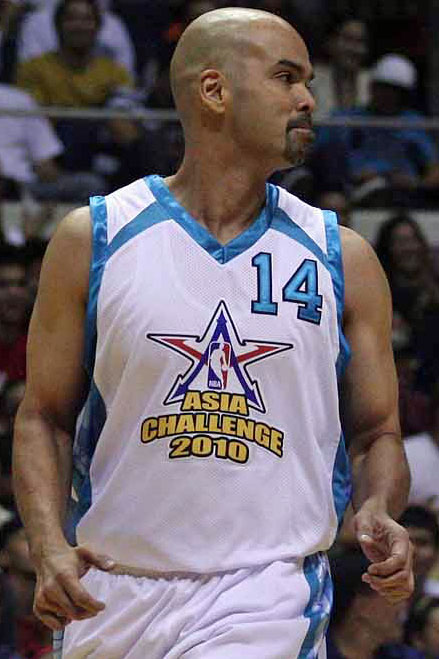
- Paras in 2010

Personal information
- Born: October 2, 1968 (age 58) Caloocan, Rizal, Philippines
- Listed height: 6 ft 4 in (1.93 m)
- Listed weight: 220 lb (100 kg)

Career information
- High school: San Beda (Manila)
- College: UP
- PBA draft: 1989: 1st round1st overall
- Drafted by: Formula Shell
- Playing career: 1989–2003
- Position: Center
- Number: 14

Career history

Playing
- 1989–2002: Shell Turbo Chargers
- 2003: San Miguel Beermen

Coaching
- 2012–2019: San Beda (assistant)
- 2019–2020: UP (assistant)

Career highlights
- As player: 4x PBA champion (1990 First, 1992 First, 1998 Governors', 1999 All-Filipino); 2× PBA Most Valuable Player (1989, 1999); PBA Rookie of the Year (1989); PBA Comeback Player of the Year (1999); PBA Best Player of the Conference (1999 Commissioner's); PBA Finals Most Valuable Player (1998 Governors'); 5× PBA Mythical First Team (1989–1991, 1995, 1999); 3× PBA Mythical Second Team (1992, 1994, 1996); 9× PBA All-Star (1989, 1990, 1991, 1992, 1994, 1995, 1996, 1999, 2000); 2× PBA All-Star Game Most Valuable Player (1994, 1999); PBA Slam Dunk Team Co-champion (1995); PBA Hall of Famer (Class of 2013); 50 Greatest Players in PBA History (2000 selection); PABL champion (1988 Maharlika); 2x PABL Most Valuable Player (1988 International, 1988 Maharlika); As assistant coach: 6x NCAA champion (2012, 2013, 2014, 2016, 2017, 2018)
Medals
Men's basketball
Representing Philippines
Asian Games
Silver medal – second place	1990 Beijing	Team
SEA Games
Gold medal – first place	1987 Jakarta	Team

Venancio Johnson Paras Jr. (born October 2, 1968), better known as Benjie Paras, is a Filipino actor, comedian, and retired professional basketball player who played for the Shell Turbo Chargers and San Miguel Beermen of the Philippine Basketball Association (PBA). Known as "The Tower of Power" during his playing days, he is the only PBA player to win both Rookie of the Year and Most Valuable Player honors, in a single season. As its star center, Paras led the Turbo Chargers to four championship titles. He is also a five time First Mythical Team member, three-time Second Mythical Team member, a nine-time All-Star and two-time All-Star MVP, and also won a Best Player of the Conference award.

== Early life and high school career ==
Paras grew up playing basketball in barangay leagues in Santol, Sta. Mesa. He first learned basketball from Nic Jorge at the BEST Center when he was 11 years old. At 13 years old, he was 6'2". San Beda coaches including Ato Badolato discovered him when they held a basketball camp in his barangay, which led to an invite to try out for the San Beda Red Cubs. Among those who were invited to try out, he was the only one who made the team.

Paras played together with Ronnie Magsanoc and Eric Altamirano. They helped lead the school to an NCAA juniors title in 1982. Magsanoc and Paras also won a gold medal together that year in track and field. In 1983, he led San Beda to a Metro Manila Basketball League (MMBL) championship. He was the MVP of that league in his last two years of high school.

Out of high school, Paras was heavily recruited. He chose to play for the UP Fighting Maroons in the UAAP, as Magsanoc, Altamirano, the alumni, and the coaching staff made a concerted effort to recruit him. He also chose to play in the UAAP as San Beda had left the NCAA and was only playing in the MMBL and in inter-secondary school competitions.

== Collegiate career ==
In his freshman year of 1986, he played with Magsanoc, Altamirano, fellow freshman Joey Guanio, and future UP champion head coach Goldwin Monteverde under the guidance of Joe Lipa. That season, the Fighting Maroons won the championship, beating the UE Red Warriors in the finals. They also won the National Inter-collegiate championship that year. As well as playing for UP, he also played for the Philippine national team and for his commercial team Philips Sardines in the Philippine Amateur Basketball League, in which he won MVP. He played three years for UP, then turned pro after his junior year in 1989 at the age of 20. Although coaches advised him to stay for one or two more years, Paras believed that he was ready, promising them that he would become the first Rookie of the Year to win MVP. With UP, he majored in BS Tourism.

== Professional career ==
=== Shell Turbo Chargers (1989–2002) ===
==== Rookie MVP season (1989) ====
Drafted by the Shell Turbo Chargers in 1989 with the first overall pick, Paras began his PBA career. Being drafted by Shell reunited him with Magsanoc once again. Together with import Bobby Parks, they led Shell to the finals of the 1989 Open Conference, where they lost to the eventual Grand Slam champions San Miguel Beermen. He then made his first appearance at the All-Star Game that season, although his team lost as Mon Fernandez scored the game-winner over him. Although Shell did not win any titles that season, his abilities were on full display as he averaged 25.8 points in 57 games, the most by a PBA rookie. He also scored 50 points twice that season, a point off the all-time mark of 51 for most points scored by a rookie, and a record held by Dennis Abbatuan since 1984. He also averaged 13 boards, and 2.6 blocks. Because of these he not only took Rookie of the Year, but also became its Most Valuable Player. As of 2026, he is the only PBA player to have accomplished this feat.

==== First title (1990–1991) ====
In 1990, Paras would lead Shell to their first PBA title during the First Conference by defeating Anejo Rhum in a championship series that finished in six games, in a climax that featured a walkout by Anejo players. He also made the All-Star team that season. In 1991, Shell and Anejo (now known as Ginebra) would meet again in the finals of the Reinforced Conference. The Turbo Chargers seemed poised to beat the Gins once again after taking a commanding 3–1 lead, but the Gins made a dramatic rally, coming back from the 3–1 deficit and winning the title in a classic Game 7 encounter that featured Rudy Distrito's game winner.

==== Requesting a trade (1992–1993) ====
In 1992, Paras and the rejuvenated Turbo Chargers, now with Leo Isaac and Rey Cuenco, led Shell to another title, winning the 1992 First Conference over the Beermen. After the 1992 title, Paras and Shell would show inconsistencies as it flirted to the cellars in several occasions. This was also capped with a controversy back in 1993 when Paras sat out for one conference after a contract dispute with Shell that prompted him to demand a trade deal to rival team Ginebra. During this time, he lived with Robert Jaworski, and relied on him for his allowance. But after Shell rejected trade offers for their prized center, he decided to concentrate on his movie and TV career for six months.

==== Return to the team and resurgence (1993–1997) ====
Paras came back to the team in the 1993 Commissioner's Cup, but the team did not made it back to the finals for a long time. They did make the semifinals in the 1994 Governors' Cup, and in the 1995 Governors' Cup, in which they denied the Sunkist Orange Juicers a grand slam. In the 1996 Commissioner's Cup, they made it back to the finals thanks in part to import Kenny Redfield and supporting casts such as Peter Naron, Richie Ticzon, Victor Pablo, and Jojo Lim. They battled the grand slam seeking Alaska Aces, then known as the Alaska Milkmen, in a seven-game series which Alaska won. Paras was also a contender to win the MVP in the 1996 season of the PBA.

Paras missed most of the 1997 Commissioner's Cup due to surgery on his knee. He would re-enter the finals two years later in the 1998 Centennial Cup Finals, this time meeting the Mobiline Phone Pals. In a one-game title showdown, Shell came up short. Paras would get his revenge thanks to the help of Noy Castillo and Gerry Esplana as the rematch was set for the Governor's Cup finals of the PBA against Mobiline. Shell came back after trailing the series 3–2. Shell and Mobiline battled into a grueling seven games until Shell prevailed due to timely baskets by Paras and Esplana.

==== Second MVP (1999) ====
In 1999, in a season which saw the influx of Filipino-American talent, some of whom were only faking to be Filipino-American, Paras dominated the league once again. He led Shell past San Miguel in the quarterfinals and Ginebra in the semis to another finals appearance in the All-Filipino Cup, this time against the Tanduay Rhum Makers. They were bannered by Fil-Am Eric Menk, who had just won Best Player of the Conference over him, and Sonny Alvarado, who would eventually be deported. He held his own against the two taller, stronger and more athletic Fil-Ams as he led Shell to another title, winning it 4–2. That would be Paras' last title, as his team was unable to stop the Beermen in the title showdown for the Commissioner's Cup. He also won the All-Star Game MVP that season, leading the Veteran All-Stars over the Rookies and Sophomores team. During the Governors' Cup, on November 10, he reached the 10,000 point milestone. At 31 years old, Paras would win his second MVP since 1989. He also won the Comeback Player of the Year award that season.

==== Injury-ridden seasons (2000–2003) ====
During the 2000s, Paras played in only 44 games due to injuries. In 2001, he re-signed with the team for a max deal of P25 million for two years. However, he was only able to play in eight games during the 2002 season. Due to his injuries, in 2003, days before the season started, he decided to retire, serving the remainder of his contract on Shell's coaching staff. Shell retired his #14 jersey.

=== San Miguel Beermen (2002–2003) ===
However, Paras returned in May 2003, suiting up for the San Miguel Beermen for two months and making his return during the quarterfinals of the 2003 All-Filipino Cup. During this time, he wore #14, a number that had previously been retired for Hector Calma. He retired once again at the end of the season to focus on raising his family as well as pursue acting full-time. Paras accumulated 10,322 career points throughout his 574 games. He is also third all-time in career blocks with 1,333.

== National team career ==
Alongside Magsanoc, Paras were also included in the Philippine national team that won the 1986 Guam Invitational and the 1987 SEA Games. In the 1986 ABC Under-18 Championship, he averaged 16.8 points and led the Philippines to the finals, where they lost to China led by Ma Jian.

Paras was also selected to play in the 1990 Asian Games Basketball Team as part of the first international event that was participated in by PBA players. That team won the silver medal, as the team came up short against China in the gold-medal match.

== Player profile ==
Paras is known for his ball-handling, rebounding, deft mid-range shooting, well-timed shot blocking, and the uncanny ability for inside scoring. With his skillset, he could block a shot in mid-air, grab the rebound, dribble the ball up the court, and finish with a dunk. At 6'4", he was one of the tallest PBA players at the time. His intensity on the court gave him the nickname "Tower of Power". Later in his career, he added mid-range shooting and a dribble-by drive to his scoring arsenal to compete with bigger players. According to basketball historian Jay P. Mercado: "At a time when we were used to the finesse of Fernandez, Guidaben, and Manny Victorino who played with flair and guile, Paras practically revolutionized the center position with his power and grace."

== Post-retirement career ==
=== Acting ===
During his basketball career, Paras made appearances in movies and television shows. His first film appearance was in the 1989 film Last Two Minutes, where he played a priest. He and other PBA players also made appearances in the FPJ film May Isang Tsuper ng Taxi. He starred in the 1993 film Dunkin Donato. In 1994, he starred in the sitcom Billy Bilyonaryo as a butler, and in Greggy en' Boogie: Sakyan mo na lang, Anna alongside Babalu. In 2003, while he was playing for the Beermen, he made appearances on the sitcom Kool Ka Lang.

Paras retired in 2003, ending his 14-year career with the PBA and became an actor full-time. Although he had never taken acting classes, he discovered that he had a talent in comedy. Over time, Paras became a versatile supporting actor who appeared on afternoon and primetime teleseryes. He appeared in Narito Ang Puso Ko, his first drama series on GMA Network. He also appeared in Lagot Ka, Isusumbong Kita, a weekly sitcom by GMA. In 2005, he starred in Encantadia as the barbarian "Wahid", with PBA players Alex Crisano and Chris Tan joining him in the supporting cast. His son Andre would reprise the role of Wahid in 2016. Later that year, he appeared in his first Metro Manila Film Festival (MMFF) film, Exodus: Tales from the Enchanted Kingdom, as Tayho, the Earth elemental. He also flexed his acting muscles by playing offbeat roles in Lupin (as Richard Gutierrez's gay inmate) and Fantastic Man (as one of Mark Herras' villains).

In November 2007, Paras was cast as one of the fictional characters for Richard Gutierrez's former fantaserye on GMA 7, Kamandag, as Haring Dinggol, king of the human-apes. In late 2007, he was cast as one of the main villains in Ramon "Bong" Revilla's movie, Resiklo, which was an entry in that year's MMFF. He also appeared in the comedy teleserye, Adik Sa'Yo with Marvin Agustin and Jolina Magdangal, until its end in 2009. He also worked with boxers Manny Pacquiao and Onyok Velasco in the sitcom, Show Me Da Manny and in the film Wapakman. Paras was back again on GMA Telebabad as a villain in the drama-fantaserye, The Last Prince. He also played as the best friend of Vic Sotto in the film Iskul Bukol 20 Years After: The Ungasis and Escaleras Adventure and the best friend of Vhong Navarro's best friend in the movie My Only U during this time. In 2010, he returned to comedy via the reality comedy program, Ang Yaman ni Lola. Benjie returned to drama again via Bantatay which he plays Jace Ventura, a pet detective.

In 2011, he played Frankie, a former basketball player who becomes a football coach alongside Paolo Contis in the family drama Futbolilits. He then was cast in Ang Panday 2, which was a MMFF entry and a box office hit. He then did the horror-comedy anthology, Spooky Nights Presents: The Ringtone and his fourth fantaserye Alice Bungisngis And Her Wonder Walis in 2012. In mid-2012, he returned to the drama again in a romantic teleserye One True Love.

In 2013, Paras co-starred in the romantic series Got to Believe on ABS-CBN alongside Kathryn Bernardo and Daniel Padilla. He also joined the comedy show Lokomoko U. In 2016, Paras was featured in the comedy anthology film Lumayo Ka Nga Sa Akin.

In 2018, Paras had a voice role in the basketball anime Barangay 143. In 2019 he had main roles on Daddy's Gurl and appeared in an episode of Ipaglaban Mo!, a legal drama anthology. In 2020, he pitched his own series, Ghost Adventures, a horror comedy for the Sari-Sari Channel. He also starred in it alongside Empoy Marquez. In 2023, he acted alongside Dingdong Dantes in the murder mystery drama Royal Blood as Dantes' best friend Napoy. In 2024, he was part of the main cast of the Viu miniseries How to Spot a Red Flag.

=== Television ===
In 2004, Paras co-hosted NAKS!, a magic-based reality show, alongside Bearwin Meily. He was also the host of ABC's local version of Guinness Book of Records in 2006. In 2007, he was also the main host for the short-lived late night ABC 5 (now TV5) game show, WinWinWin. In 2024, he co-hosted the business show Negosyo Goals on All TV and GTV.

Paras was included in the Christmas reality show, Puso Ng Pasko: Artista Challenge in 2010 which he was a challenger.

Paras has also been a basketball commentator and analyst. When NBA games were being broadcast on S+A during the 2010s, he and Magsanoc commentated the games. Paras also co-hosted the PBA AKTV Center, with Magsanoc sometimes making appearances on the show. In 2022, he became an NCAA analyst for GMA Sports. His son Andre also became an NCAA analyst, and they did several segments together. They also commentated Pilipinas Super League games together in 2023.

=== Businesses ===
Throughout his career, Paras has been an endorser for numerous companies and products such as Dunkin' Donuts, Handyman, Mang Tomas, and PalawanPay. As an endorser for Puma, he was given his own shoe the "Tower of Power" in 2000. In 2018, Ronald Mascariñas gave him a Chooks-to-Go franchise, as he and the Paras family were endorsers of the company. He had previously owned a franchise of Brothers Burger alongside Eric Altamirano and Altamirano's wife.

=== Coaching and grassroots ===
In 2012, Magsanoc was hired as the head coach of the San Beda Red Lions. Paras was hired as one of his assistant coaches. Although Magsanoc left the team after 2012, he stayed on the coaching staff. He was an assistant coach for them until 2019. Paras and Magsanoc also coached together in the PBA D-League with the Hapee Fresh Fighters. He then became an assistant coach for the UP Fighting Maroons alongside Magsanoc and Guanio. In 2021, he was hired as a consultant for the Blackwater Bossing.

In 2025, Paras became the commissioner of the Philippine Youth Basketball Championship, a grassroots basketball league for student-athletes that provided them with advanced performance analytics and age-based player rankings.

== Personal life ==
Paras is married to Lyxen Diomampo, a former pre-school teacher and commercial model. They have two sons, Riley and Sam, and a daughter, Georja. He also has two sons from a previous marriage with Jackie Forster, Andre and Kobe. He raised both Andre and Kobe as a single parent. Both have had basketball careers and started playing for La Salle Greenhills basketball team in grade school. André is also an actor at GMA 7, while Kobe has played collegiate ball for Creighton, Cal State Northridge, and for the UP Fighting Maroons, and professionally for the Niigata Albirex BB in Japan.

Paras is the godfather of Magsanoc's eldest daughter. He is also a godfather of Bobby Ray Parks Jr.

== Filmography ==
=== Film ===
- Last Two Minutes (1989)
- May Isang Tsuper ng Taxi (1990)
- Bulag, Pipi at Bingi (1993)
- Dunkin Donato (1993)
- Mga Siyanong Parak (1993)
- Greggy en' Boogie: Sakyan mo na lang, Anna (1994)
- Exodus: Tales from the Enchanted Kingdom (2005)
- Resiklo (Imus Productions, 2007)
- My Bestfriend's Girlfriend (2008)
- My Only Ü (Star Cinema, 2008) – Doc Hector D. Doctor
- Iskul Bukol 20 Years After: The Ungasis and Escaleras Adventure (2008)
- Wapakman (2009)
- Ang Panday (2009)
- Si Agimat at si Enteng Kabisote (2010)
- Ang Panday 2 (2011)
- My Lady Boss (2013)
- Ibong Adarna: The Pinoy Adventure (2014)
- Past Tense (2014)
- Papa's Boy (2015)
- Wang Fam (2015)
- Lumayo Ka Nga sa Akin (2016) - post production
- Dear Future Husband (2017) - post production
- Barbi: D' Wonder Beki (2017)
- Mang Kepweng: Ang Lihim ng Bandanang Itim (2020)
- Hello, Universe! (2023)
- Sinagtala (2025)

=== Television ===
Year	Title	Role	Note(s)
1987–1998	Palibhasa Lalake		
1989	Last Two Minutes: The Sitcom		
1989	Ang Tabi Kong Mamaw		
1989	Young Love, Sweet Love	Various roles	
1990–1992	Estudyante Blues		
	Just the 3 of Us		
1993–1998	Oki Doki Doc		
	Haybol Rambol		
1998–2003	Kool Ka Lang	Jie	
2003–2004	Narito ang Puso Ko	Boyong	
	Kakabaka-Boo		
	Kakabakaba Adventures		
2003–2007	Lagot Ka, Isusumbong Kita	Junior	
	Guinness Book of World Records Philippine Edition		
	Naks!		
	Wag Kukurap	Various roles	
	GMA Telecine Specials	Various roles	
	Campus Romance		
	Mikee		
	Dear Mikee		
	Sa Dako Pa Roon		
	Gags Must Be Crazy		
2005–2006	My Guardian Abby		
2005	Encantadia	Wahid	
2005–2006	Etheria: Ang Ikalimang Kaharian ng Encantadia	Wahid	
2006	Encantadia: Pag-ibig Hanggang Wakas	Wahid	
2006	Family Zoo		
2006	Love to Love		
2007	Lupin	Generoso/Jenny	
2007	Mga Kuwento ni Lola Basyang	Higanteng Amok	
2007	Fantastic Man	Gobo	
2007	Magic Kamison	Pancho	
2007	Boys Nxt Door	Badong	
2007	Kamandag	Haring Dinggol	
2007–2020	Maynila	Various roles	
	Finish Line		
	Win Win Win		
2008–2014	Maalaala Mo Kaya	Various roles	
2008–2009	Gagambino	Stalin	
2009	Adik Sa'Yo	Benjo	
2009	Clear Men Future League		
2009–2011	Show Me Da Manny	Oscar Paredes	
2010	The Last Prince	Rizayo	
2010	Ang Yaman ni Lola	Benjo Cabagnot	
2010	Puso ng Pasko: Artista Challenge	Challenger	
2010	Bantatay	Jace	
2011	Spooky Nights Presents: The Ringtone		
2011	Futbolilits	Harrison Fortunato	
2011	Manny Many Prizes	Himself (co-host)	
2012	Alice Bungisngis and her Wonder Walis	Timoteo/Tim	
2012	One True Love	Douglas	
2012	Toda Max	Benjo	
2013	Wagas	Various roles	
2013	Got to Believe	Chito Tampipi	
2013	Video Incredible		
2013–2016	Wansapanataym	Various roles	
2014	Tunay na Buhay	Himself (guest)	
2015–2019	NBA Sabados sa Dos	Himself (sports commentator)	
2015	Nathaniel	Abner Bartolome	
2015	The Half Sisters	Peter	Uncredited
2015	Sabado Badoo	Himself (guest)	
2015	And I Love You So	Joey Ramirez	
2016–2020	Dear Uge	Various roles	
2016	Tsuperhero	Makutoks	
2016–2017	Trops	Coach Fred	
2017	The Promise of Forever	Geoffrey Madrid	
2017	The Lolas' Beautiful Show	Himself (guest)	
2017–2019	Ipaglaban Mo!	Various roles	
2018	Bagani	Bernardo Carpio	
2018	Victor Magtanggol	Erwin Bravo	
2018	Barangay 143	Abdul	
2018	Daddy's Gurl	Tom	
2019	The Boobay and Tekla Show	Himself (guest)	
2019	Ipaglaban Mo!	Various roles	
2019–2022	Prima Donnas	Agaton Salazar	
2020	Mars Pa More	Himself (guest)	
2020	Fill in the Bank	Himself (celebrity player)	
2020	Sunday 'Kada	Himself (guest)	
2020	Lunch Out Loud	Himself (guest)	
2020	Iba Yan!	Himself (guest)	
2021	Wanted ang Serye		
2021	I Can See You: The Lookout	Kapitan	
2021	Sing Galing	Himself (celebrity player)	
2021–2022	Agimat ng Agila	Sgt. Wesley Dimanahan	
2022	Start-Up PH	Himself (guest)	
2022	Jose and Maria's Bonggang Villa	Mr. Rico Nero Cusin	
2022	Regal Studio Presents: Most Valuable Daddy	Emerson	
2023	The Iron Heart	Aphroditus "Aphro" Viray	
2023	Royal Blood	Napoy	
2024	How to Spot a Red Flag	Ime	
2025	Encantadia Chronicles: Sang'gre	Kapre	
2025	Ghosting	Kiko	
2025	Rainbow Rumble	Himself (celebrity player)	
2026	A Secret in Prague	Quintin "Tintin" Salazar	
2026	The Master Cutter	Elias Matangbaka	

=== Radio ===
- Walang Bolahan (DWIZ) (2026–present)

== Awards and achievements ==
=== PBA ===
- 4x PBA Champion (1990, 1992, 1998 & 1999)
- 2-time Most Valuable Player (1989 & 1999)
- Rookie of the Year (1989)
- 5-time Mythical First Team Selection (1989, 1990, 1991, 1995 & 1999)
- 3-time Mythical Second Team Selection (1992, 1994 & 1996)
- Best Player of the Conference (1999 Commissioner's Cup)
- Comeback Player of the Year (1999)
- Eight-time PBA All-Star
- 2-time PBA All-Star Game Most Valuable Player (1994 & 1999)
- PBA 25th Anniversary Team
- PBA Hall of Fame

=== Philippine national team ===
- Member of the 1990 Asian Games national team (silver medal)
