= Arlene Rodriguez =

Filipino basketball player and coach

Personal information
- Born: April 15, 1954 (age 72) Philippines
- Listed height: 6 ft 0 in (1.83 m)

Career information
- High school: JRC (Mandaluyong)
- College: JRC
- Position: Point guard
- Number: 23
- Coaching career: 1988–2000

Career history

Playing
- 1977: Presto (MICAA)

Coaching
- 1988–1990: Shell Rimula X (assistant)
- 1990–1991: Shell Rimula X
- 1991–1994: Barangay Ginebra Kings (assistant)
- 1995: Philippines
- 1998: Magnolia Purewater Wizards
- 1998–1999: Wilkins Distilled
- 1999: Cagayan de Oro Amigos
- 2019: Mandaluyong El Tigre
- 2022: TUP Gray Hawks

Career highlights
- As head coach: PBA champion (1990 First)

Arlene Fajardo Rodriguez (born April 15, 1954) is a Filipino coach and former player.

== Career ==
=== Playing career ===
Rodriguez played for JRC Heavy Bombers since high school until college. In MICAA, he played for CFC Presto.

=== Coaching career ===
Rodriguez was coach of the Philippines women's national under-18 team for the 1989 ABC Under-18 Championship for Women.

Rodriguez was started as an assistant coach to Dante Silverio in Formula Shell. Rodriguez later coached the team until 1991.

He leave Formula Shell to replace Rino Salazar as an assistant coach to Robert Jaworski in Ginebra. He later coached the Philippine National team, and some PBL and MBA teams.

Currently, he is the coach of TUP Greyhawks.

==== Grassroots Projects ====
He is one of the coaches in Milo Best Centers. He's also working in a grassroots programs.
