= Nandy Garcia =

Filipino basketball player

Fernando Garcia
Personal information
- Born: February 5 Imus, Cavite
- Listed height: 6 ft 2 in (1.88 m)

Career information
- High school: Adamson (Manila)
- College: Adamson
- PBA draft: 1989: 3rd round17th
- Drafted by: Añejo Rum 65
- Playing career: 1989–1994
- Position: Forward
- Number: 8

Career history

Playing
- 1989–1990: Añejo Rum 65
- 1990-1991: Sarsi Sizzlers
- 1991–1993: Alaska Milkmen

Coaching
- 2018: Imus Bandera

Fernando "Nandy" Garcia (born February 5) is a retired Filipino professional basketball player in the Philippine Basketball Association (PBA).

He rose from amateur ranks for nine years at Adamson University as a Baby Falcon and Falcon at the University Athletic Association of the Philippines (UAAP) to become a PBA champion.

== Career ==
After leading Adamson in scoring at the UAAP and playing in other amateur teams, Garcia played in the PBA. He played forward for Añejo Rum 65 in 1989 and Sarsi Sizzlers in 1990. Garcia transferred to the Alaska Milkmen and they won the 1991 PBA Third Conference finals under Coach Tim Cone.
