= Dante Gonzalgo =

Filipino former basketball player

Personal information
- Born: July 9, 1958 (age 68)
- Listed height: 6 ft 2 in (1.88 m)
- Listed weight: 185 lb (84 kg)

Career information
- College: Lyceum
- Playing career: 1984–1993
- Position: Small forward
- Number: 10, 11, 12, 15

Career history

Playing
- 1984–1985: Magnolia
- 1986–1993: Ginebra

Coaching
- 2000–2001: ANA Freezers

Career highlights
- 3× PBA champion (1986 Open, 1988 All-Filipino, 1991 First); PBA All-Star (1990, 1991, 1992); PBA Most Improved Player Award (1989)
Medals
Men's basketball
Representing Philippines
Asian Games
Silver medal – second place	1990 Beijing	Team
SEA Games
Gold medal – first place	1983 Singapore	Team

Genaro "Dante" Gonzalgo (born July 8, 1958) is a Filipino former basketball player. He was nicknamed "Bicol Express", and "Iron Man".

== Playing career ==
=== Amateur ===
Gonzalgo played for Crispa 400 from 1980 to 1981 in MICAA.

=== Professional ===
Gonzalgo played for Magnolia in 1984 until 1985. After the temporary disbandment of Magnolia, he played for Ginebra under Robert Jaworski, and He played with Chito Loyzaga. While playing at Ginebra, he was one of his toughest defenders and trusted import-stopper. Gonzalgo was the PBA's original Iron Man whose 280 straight games played from 1987 to 1991 was the league record before Alvin Patrimonio eventually surpassed it.

On April 5, 1990, Gonzalgo shot a three-pointer against Norman Black-coached San Miguel Beermen in a crucial semifinal game. But after he fouled Dignadice, it missed his first attempt, before deliberately missing the second. Añejo import Sylvester Gray collared the rebound, then quickly threw the ball to Rey Cuenco, who then passed it to Gonzalgo, and shot a three-pointer sealing Anejo's 123–122 win.

=== National team ===
Gonzalgo was part of 1990 Philippine Team that won silver medal in 1990 Asian Games. The team was also coached by Jaworski. He also played for the national team in 1982 Asian Games, and 1983 SEA Games.

== Coaching career ==
Gonzalgo coached the ANA Freezers in PBL.

== Personal life ==
Gonzalgo is from Sorsogon. He became a Kagawad on his barangay.
