= Al Solis =

Filipino basketball player

Alfonso Solis
Personal information
- Born: December 23, 1962 (age 63) Davao City, Philippines
- Listed height: 5 ft 11 in (1.80 m)
- Listed weight: 170 lb (77 kg)

Career information
- High school: UV (Cebu City)
- College: UV
- PBA draft: 1987: 1st round, 2nd overall pick
- Drafted by: Hills Bros.
- Playing career: 1987–2001
- Position: Shooting guard
- Number: 8

Career history
- 1987: Formula Shell
- 1988–1990: Purefoods Hotdogs
- 1991–1995: Swift/Sunkist
- 1996–2000: Pepsi/Mobiline
- 2001: Batang Red Bull Thunder

Career highlights
- 5× PBA champion (1990 Third, 1992 Third, 1993 Commissioner's, 1995 All-Filipino, 1995 Commissioner's); 3× PBA All-Star (1991–1993)

Alfonso Solis (born December 23, 1962), better known as Al Solis, is a Filipino retired professional basketball player in the Philippine Basketball Association (PBA).

== Amateur career ==
Solis started in 1977 with the University of the Visayas Baby Lancers, UV's high school team. After spending three years of junior basketball, Solis was elevated to the collegiate ranks and lasted until 1984. Simultaneously with his UV stint, he played for several local commercial teams in Cebu. Al became one of the veteran players in the Philippine Amateur Basketball League as he suited up in the very first PABL tournament, playing for Fariñas Transit and then to Cine Suerte under coach Arturo Valenzona.

Solis became a member of the RP Youth team that finished third in the 1984 ABC 19 and under meet in Seoul, South Korea. The following year, he joined the Northern Cement basketball team of coach Ron Jacobs. In 1985, Solis saw action for Lagerlite Beer and after which he went back to Cebu. In his final year in the amateurs, Solis became part of the Lhuillier Jewelers' champion team in the 1986 PABL First Conference.

== Professional career ==
Originally drafted by Hills Bros. (formerly Alaska Milk) in the PBA, Solis was traded to Shell, along with Rey Cuenco in exchange for Bogs Adornado. After placing second to Allan Caidic for the rookie of the year honors in his freshman year, Solis moved to newcomer Purefoods Hotdogs at the beginning of the 1988 PBA season. Al was responsible for leading the Hotdogs to their first-ever PBA championship in 1990, he scored a clutch three-pointer with 14 seconds remaining and two seconds on their shotclock, that gave the Hotdogs a four-point cushion in the deciding Game five of the third conference finals against Alaska Milkmen.

He was offered a P2.6 million contract by the RFM franchise the following season which Purefoods surprisingly didn't match. Solis went on to win four championships with the Swift/Sunkist ballclub. He moved to Pepsi/Mobiline beginning the 1996 PBA season. Al's last stop in the PBA was playing 12 games with Batang Red Bull in the 2001 All-Filipino Cup. After that, he went on to play for Cebu Gems in the MBA.

In his 15 years in the PBA, Solis made the Mythical First team twice and was an All-Star once. He was the 26th player to reach the 5,000-point plateau.
