= Jerry Ruiz =

American director

Jerry Ruiz is an American theatre director.

== Early life and education ==
Jerry Ruiz grew up in Brownsville, Texas. Ruiz graduated from college with honors, receiving a Bachelor of Arts in English Literature and Language from Harvard University in 2000. In 2007, he obtained a Master of Fine Arts in Directing from the University of California, San Diego.

== Career ==
From 2010-2015, Ruiz collaborated with the Two River Theater Company, acting as curator for the new play festival Crossing Rivers. In 2010, Ruiz directed Kiss Bessemer Goodbye at Repertorio Español, a play written by Tencha Ávila, which demonstrates the racial and economic tensions of a Mexican-American family living in Colorado in the 1970s. In 2011, he began working with playwrights Tanya Saracho and Mando Alvarado, directing readings and productions of their plays in NYC. Jerry Ruiz was one of the directors of the New York One-Minute Play Festival of Latino Voices that took place in November 2013. In 2014, he was invited to direct In the Heights, by Lin-Manuel Miranda, at the University of Texas at Austin. Ruiz is the former Executive Director at the Guadalupe Cultural Arts Center. Ruiz's vision at the Guadalupe Cultural Arts Center was to help those that identify as Latino, Chicano, or Mexican-American to examine what it means to belong to these groups. In 2016, Ruiz was named Associate Artistic Director at PlayMakers Repertory Company In 2018, he became an assistant professor at Texas State University, where he heads the Directing program.

== Notable credits ==
Plays as Director:

1. Mala Hierba, by Tanya Saracho, at Second Stage
2. Fade, by Tanya Saracho, at Denver Center for the Performing Arts, and then produced by Primary Stages at Cherry Lane Theatre
3. Enfrascada, by Tanya Saracho, at Clubbed Thumb
4. Basílica, by Mando Alvarado, at the Rattlestick Playwrights Theater
5. Twelfth Night, by William Shakespeare at PlayMakers Repertory Company and the Old Globe Theater.
6. The Survivors, by Katie Bender at the Alley Theater's Alley All New Festival.
7. Mariela in the Desert, by Karen Zacarías, at Repertorio Español
8. Sangre, by Mando Alvarado, at SummerStage
9. Philip Goes Forth, by George Kelly, at Mint Theater Company
10. Love Goes to Press, by Martha Gellhorn and Virginia Cowles, at Mint Theater Company
11. A Map of Broken Glass, by Anna Ziegler, at F*it Club
12. Rattlers, by Johnna Adams, at Flux Ensemble Theater
13. The King is Dead, by Caroline McGraw, at Highwire Theater

Plays as Assistant Director:

1. La bohème, directed by Baz Luhrmann at Broadway theatre
2. Measure for Measure, directed by Bill Rauch, at Oregon Shakespeare Festival
3. Taking Over, directed by Tony Taccone, at The Public Theater
4. The Winter's Tale, directed by Darko Tresnjak, at The Old Globe Theatre
5. Mother Courage and Her Children, directed by Lisa Peterson, at La Jolla Playhouse

Notable awards and fellowships:

1. Second Stage Van Lier Directing Fellow, from 2007-2009
2. NEA/TCG Career Development Program for Directors Grant, from 2009-2011
3. Phil Killian Fellow at the Oregon Shakespeare Festival, 2011
