= Best Center =

- Formation: 1978; 48 years ago
- Founder: Nic Jorge
- Headquarters: Quezon City, Metro Manila, Philippines
- Services: Sports training (basketball and volleyball)
- Owner: Best Center Sports Inc.

The Best Center (stylized as BEST Center; "BEST" being an abbreviation of Basketball Efficiency & Scientific Training), also known as Milo Best Center for sponsorship reasons, is a scientific basketball training academy based in the Philippines. Since its inception, BEST Center offers year-round training of the sport of basketball for young ang aspiring players using scientific and systematic approach and techniques.

Best Center was founded in 1978 by Nicanor Jorge, a former member of the UP Fighting Maroons men's basketball team in the UAAP and a national coach. Jorge was instrumental in the national team's campaign in the 1978 FIBA World Championship as the head coach. Among the products who have molded in the Best Center and became basketball superstars are Benjie Paras, Jerry Codiñera, Boybits Victoria, Jun Limpot, Rey Evangelista, Patrick Fran, Paolo Mendoza, Chris Tiu and Kiefer Ravena.

It also offers volleyball clinics during the Summer season. Aside from organizing clinics, Best Center also organized the Women's Volleyball League, the longest-running volleyball tournament for girls in the 13-under and 17-under divisions.

Best Center also partnered with Milo, as part of the energy drink's continuing sports development program in the country. The center also cited by the Philippine Olympic Committee (Olympism Award) and the Philippine Sportswriters Association awards as hall of famer.
