= Leo Isaac =

Filipino basketball player and coach

Personal information
- Born: February 2, 1961 (age 65)
- Listed height: 6 ft 1 in (1.85 m)
- Listed weight: 172 lb (78 kg)

Career information
- College: Mapúa
- PBA draft: 1986:
- Drafted by: Ginebra San Miguel
- Playing career: 1986–1995
- Position: Shooting guard
- Number: 9
- Coaching career: 1997–2019

Career history

Playing
- 1986–1991: Ginebra San Miguel / Añejo Rum 65
- 1992–93: Shell Rimula X Oilers
- 1994–95: Tondeña 65 Rhum Masters / Ginebra San Miguel

Coaching
- 1997: Mobiline Cellulars (assistant)
- 1998–1999: Doctor J/Ana Water Dispenser
- 1999–2000: Boom Laundry Masters
- 2000–2001: Montaña Pawnshop Jewels
- 2002–2003: Blu All Purpose Detergent Kings
- 2007–2008: Mapúa
- 2007–2009: Air21 Express (assistant)
- 2009–2010: Barako Bull Energy Boosters
- 2010–2011: Arellano
- 2011–2014: Blackwater Sports
- 2014–2018: Blackwater Elite
- 2018–2019: Bacoor Strikers

Career highlights
- 4× PBA champion (1986 Open, 1988 All-Filipino, 1991 First, 1992 First)

Leandro "Leo" Isaac (born February 2, 1961) is a Filipino former basketball player, commentator, and former coach.

He is chief operating officer of the basketball league Sinag Liga Asya.

== College career ==
He played for the Mapua Cardinals in the NCAA from 1978 to 1981 and was voted MVP for the 1981 NCAA Men's Basketball Championship. His notable teammates include Joel Banal, Junel Baculi, and Bong Ramos.

== PBA career ==
He played for Ginebra San Miguel from 1986 to 1991 and 1994 to 1995. In his rookie season in 1986, he helped Ginebra win its first ever championship during the 1986 PBA Open Conference. He earned his spot in coach Robert Jaworski's rotation as a reliable backcourt defender and his valuable contributions on defense helped the Gin Kings win two more championships in 1988 and 1991.

Prior to the start of 1992 PBA season, he was traded to Pepsi for Tonichi Yturri, and then to Shell Rimula-X in exchange for Gido Babilonia and Leo Austria. He helped the Oilers win the 1992 First Conference championship against the San Miguel Beermen. He stayed with the team until the 1993 season.

He retired from playing in the PBA after the 1995 season.

== Coaching career ==
=== Philippine Basketball League ===
He once mentored teams such as Dr. J. Alcohol / Ana Water Dispenser, Boom Laundry Masters, Montaña Jewels, Blu All Purpose Detergent Kings, and Noosa Shoe Stars. In 1998, while coaching for Doctor J, he won his first ever championship as a coach at the expense of the heavily favored Tanduay team in the 1998–99 2nd PBL Centennial Cup.

=== Mapua Cardinals ===
Isaac took over as Mapua's head coach prior to the 2007 season. He led the Cardinals to back-to-back Final 4 slots wherein during both appearances they were at #4. His records with them were 6–6 and 9–5, respectively.

=== Barako Bull Energy Boosters ===
In 2009, Isaac was hired as head coach for the Barako Bull Energy Boosters in the PBA after Yeng Guiao resigned and later moved to Burger King Whoppers. His chief lieutenants were Raymund Celis and Ariel Vanguardia. He was then succeeded by Junel Baculi after coaching just one season.

=== Arellano University ===
He led them to several titles including the NCRAA championship in 2007. After a season coaching Red Bull, in 2010 he once again coached the Chiefs, this time, in the NCAA for two seasons.

=== Blackwater Elite (PBA D-League) ===
In 2011, Isaac was appointed head coach of the Blackwater Elite, one of the founding franchises in the newly formed PBA Developmental League. He helped the Elite win its first and only championship against the NLEX Road Warriors during the 2013 PBA D-League Foundation Cup and in the process, earned the distinction as the only team who beat the Road Warriors in the Finals.

=== Blackwater Elite (PBA) ===
In 2014, Isaac was retained as the team's head coach after team owner Dioceldo Sy elevated his franchise as an expansion team in the PBA. He is expected to inject the "never-say-die" experience that he got from his playing years with Ginebra. However, his team was winless in the Philippine Cup, with 0–11 win–loss record. In his first season with the Elite, he compiled a 6–27 win–loss record.

== Coaching record ==
=== Collegiate record ===
Season	Team	Elimination round					Playoffs				
Season	Team	GP	W	L	PCT	Finish	GP	W	L	PCT	Results
2007	MIT	12	6	6	.500	4th	1	0	1	.500	Semifinals
2008	MIT	14	9	5	.643	4th	4	2	2	.500	Semifinals
2010	AU	16	6	10	.375	6th	–	–	–	–	Eliminated
2011	AU	18	6	12	.333	7th	–	–	–	–	Eliminated
Totals		60	27	33	.450		5	2	3	.400	0 championships

=== Professional record ===
Season	Team	Conference	Elimination/classification round					Playoffs				
Season	Team	Conference	G	W	L	PCT	Finish	PG	W	L	PCT	Results
2008–09	Barako Bull	Fiesta	12	2	10	.143	10th	1	0	1	.000	Wildcard phase
2014–15	Blackwater	Philippine Cup	11	0	11	.000	12th	—	—	—	—	Eliminated
2014–15	Blackwater	Commissioner's Cup	11	3	8	.273	12th	—	—	—	—	Eliminated
2014–15	Blackwater	Governors' Cup	11	3	8	.273	12th	—	—	—	—	Eliminated
2015–16	Blackwater	Philippine Cup	11	3	8	.273	10th	1	0	1	.000	Quarterfinals (1st phase)
2015–16	Blackwater	Commissioner's Cup	11	3	8	.273	10th	—	—	—	—	Eliminated
2015–16	Blackwater	Governors' Cup	11	1	10	.910	12th	—	—	—	—	Eliminated
2016–17	Blackwater	Philippine Cup	11	5	6	.455	9th	—	—	—	—	Eliminated
2016–17	Blackwater	Commissioner's Cup	11	2	9	.182	11th	—	—	—	—	Eliminated
2016–17	Blackwater	Governors' Cup	11	5	6	.455	8th	2	1	1	.500	Quarterfinals
2017–18	Blackwater	Philippine Cup	11	5	6	.455	10th	—	—	—	—	Eliminated
2017–18	Blackwater	Commissioner's Cup	3	0	3	.000	(fired)	—	—	—	—	—
Career totals			125	32	93	.256	Playoff totals	4	1	3	.250	0 championships

== In other media ==
- He was also a PBA commentator during the 2003 season.
- Outside of basketball, he is also an avid analyst of horse racing.

Preceded by first	Dr. J Rubbing Alcohol head coach 1998	Succeeded by last
Preceded by first	Montaña Pawnshop head coach 2001–2002	Succeeded by Turo Valenzona
Preceded by –	Blustar Detergent Kings head coach 2002–2003	Succeeded by last
Preceded by Horacio Lim	Mapua Cardinals men's basketball head coach 2007–2008	Succeeded by Chito Victolero
Preceded by	Arellano Chiefs men's basketball head coach Until 2009	Succeeded by Junjie Ablan
Preceded by first	Noosa Shoe Stars head coach 2008	Succeeded by last
Preceded by Yeng Guiao	Barako Bull Energy Boosters head coach 2009–2010	Succeeded by Junel Baculi
Preceded by Junjie Ablan	Arellano Chiefs men's basketball head coach 2010	Succeeded by Koy Banal
Preceded by first	Blackwater Sports (PBA D-League) head coach 2011–2014	Succeeded by elevated
Preceded by first	Blackwater Elite head coach 2014–2018	Succeeded by incumbent
