= Rino Salazar =

Filipino former basketball player and coach

Personal information
- Born: March 30, 1952 (age 74)
- Listed height: 5 ft 9 in (1.75 m)
- Listed weight: 160 lb (73 kg)

Career information
- College: Letran
- Playing career: 1975–1981
- Position: Point guard
- Number: 7, 14
- Coaching career: 1982–1999

Career history

Playing
- 1975–1978: Tanduay Rhum Makers
- 1978–1981: Toyota Super Corollas

Coaching
- 1982–1983: Toyota (assistant)
- 1985–1991: Ginebra (assistant)
- 1991–1994: Formula Shell
- 1995–1998: Ginebra (assistant)
- 1998–1999: Ginebra

Career highlights
- As player: 4× PBA champion (1978 All-Filipino, 1978 Invitational, 1979 Invitational, 1981 Open); As head coach: PBA champion (1992 First); As assistant coach: 5× PBA champion (1982 Reinforced Filipino, 1986 Open, 1988 All-Filipino, 1991 First, 1997 Commissioner's)

Quirino "Rino" Salazar (born March 30, 1952) is a former Filipino basketball player and coach.

== Career ==
=== Playing ===
A Letranista, Salazar played for Letran in college. He later played in PBA teams such as Tanduay and Toyota. In Toyota, he played with his future colleague Robert Jaworski.

=== Coaching ===
After moving out of the court, Salazar entered the sidelines as assistant coach of Toyota, and won the 1982 Reinforced Filipino Conference finals. He later quit to focus on a small business.

But in 1985, after Jaworski' appointment as coach of La Tondeña's Ginebra San Miguel, Jaworski offered him to be an assistant coach. They won two championships.

In 1992, Shell franchise hired him as their head coach. The team won a championship in 1992 First Conference.

After his tenure with Shell, he returned to Ginebra, where he won two more championships. However, following Jaworski's resignation and subsequent Senate run in 1998, Salazar took over as the interim coach. He notably led the team during the 1999 PBA All-Filipino Cup quarterfinals, achieving an upset victory over the top-seeded Mobiline Phone Pals. Salazar later resigned when his family relocated overseas.
