= Ely Capacio =

Filipino basketball player, coach and executive

Personal information
- Born: March 14, 1955 Palo, Leyte, Philippines
- Died: February 23, 2014 (aged 58) Manila, Philippines
- Listed height: 6 ft 4 in (1.93 m)
- Listed weight: 180 lb (82 kg)
- Position: Power forward / center

Career history

Playing
- –1979: YCO Painters
- 1980–1986: Tanduay Rhum Masters

Coaching
- 1987: Tanduay Rhum Makers (assistant)
- 1987: Tanduay Rhum Makers
- 1988–1991: Purefoods Hotdogs (assistant)
- 1991–1992: Purefoods Hotdogs

Career highlights
- As head coach: PBA champion (1991 All-Filipino); As assistant coach: 2x PBA champion (1987 Open, 1990 Third Conference); As player: MICAA champion (1979)
Medals
Men's basketball
Representing Philippines
SEA Games
Gold medal – first place	1977 Kuala Lumpur	Team

Eliezer "Ely" O. Capacio (March 14, 1955 – February 23, 2014) was a Filipino basketball player, coach and executive. Born in Palo, Leyte, Philippines, he played a total of eight seasons as a forward-center for the Tanduay Rhum Makers from 1979 to 1986, averaging 5.9 points and 5.5 rebounds in a total of 324 games. The team won two championships during the 1986 PBA season. His younger brother, Glenn Capacio also played in the PBA.

== Amateur career ==
The 6-4 center-forward was a veteran of the 1975 and 1977 Asian Basketball Confederation (ABC) championships and the 1977 SEA games. Capacio was a member of the MICAA mythical selection in 1976 and was part of the YCO Painters champion team in 1979, before joining the pro ranks.

== Coaching career ==
After he retired from active playing, Capacio became part of the Tanduay coaching staff of Arturo Valenzona. When the Rhum Makers got eliminated in the second conference of the 1987 PBA season, Valenzona was replaced and moved over to the Hills Bros. camp, Capacio succeeded Valenzona on the Tanduay bench. Capacio was assistant coach to new team Purefoods Hotdogs from 1988-1990.

Towards the second round of the 1991 PBA First Conference semifinals, Capacio succeeded Baby Dalupan as Purefoods coach when "The Maestro" decided to quit after differences with the management. The following conference, coach Capacio led the franchise to its first ever PBA All-Filipino Conference championship. The next two conferences, the Hotdogs failed to make it past the eliminations. Capacio was replaced by Domingo Panganiban, who acted as coach and team manager of the team starting the 1992 PBA All-Filipino Conference.

== League chairman ==
The Philippine Basketball Association then hired him as league chairman in 2005. He was vice president for human resources of Purefoods at the time of his death and would have served a second term as chair of the PBA board in the 2014–15 season.

== Death ==
In February 2014, Capacio was playing a round of golf with Purefoods president Francisco Alejo. Capacio complained of back pain during the game. He completed the round but declined having lunch and later suffered a stroke from a ruptured aneurysm. Capacio died at age 58, at a hospital in Manila on February 23, 2014.
