= Rudy Distrito =

Filipino basketball player

Personal information
- Born: May 17, 1958 (age 68) Bacolod, Philippines
- Listed height: 5 ft 11 in (1.80 m)
- Listed weight: 165 lb (75 kg)

Career information
- College: UE
- PBA draft: 1981 Elevated
- Drafted by: Crispa Redmanizers
- Playing career: 1981–1995, 1999
- Position: Shooting guard
- Number: 14, 17

Career history
- 1981–1982: Crispa Redmanizers
- 1983–1984: Manhattan/Sunkist/Winston/Country Fair
- 1984–1985: Gold Eagle Beer/Magnolia Ice Cream
- 1986: Alaska Milk
- 1987: Magnolia Ice Cream/Juice Drink (PABL)
- 1987–1991: Ginebra San Miguel
- 1992–1995: Swift Mighty Meaties/Sunkist Orange Juicers
- 1999: San Juan Knights (MBA)

Career highlights
- 5× PBA champion (1981 Reinforced Filipino, 1988 All-Filipino, 1991 First, 1992 Third, 1993 Commissioner's)

Rudy Distrito (born May 17, 1958 in Bacolod), is a retired Filipino professional basketball player in the Philippine Basketball Association (PBA). His moniker is The Destroyer because of his rugged and intense brand of play.

== Amateur career ==
For three years, Distrito played collegiate basketball in the University of the East under coach Filo Pumaren and at the same time played for Crispa in the MICAA.

== Professional career ==
Distrito was recruited by Crispa and played with the Redmanizers from 1981 to 1982. After Crispa, he was acquired by Sanyu Group of Companies, which took over from the U/tex franchise, he played for the team for nearly two seasons and was shipped to Gold Eagle Beermen in late 1984. Distrito stayed on with the SMC ballclub until the team filed a leave of absence after the 1985 season. After one season with newcomer Alaska Milk in 1986. He revert to amateur status and briefly played for Magnolia in the PABL and was signed by the Ginebra San Miguel as a free agent in 1987.

He spent the best years of his career with Ginebra playing under coach Robert Jaworski. He is best remembered for taking the winning shot in Game Seven that completed Ginebra’s return from a 1-3 finals deficit against Shell Rimula X in 1991 First Conference championship series. He was traded to Swift for Pido Jarencio in 1992, and played for the RFM Franchise until 1995.

He was suspended and eventually banned for life by then PBA Commissioner Jun Bernardino in 1995 for committing a flagrant foul after hoisting a dangerous tackle on then-Alaska rookie Jeffrey Cariaso in midair while Cariaso was going for an uncontested layup during their game against the Milkmen in the 1995 PBA All-Filipino Cup finals. The Games and Amusement Board also revoked his playing license. He was never able to play in the PBA again.

He also played from the San Juan Knights in the MBA alongside Chris Calaguio, former teammate Bonel Balingit, Omanzie Rodriguez and Chito Victolero during the 1999 season.

== Later life ==
Distrito moved to the United States with his family shortly after his retirement and got separated from his wife thereafter.

On November 24, 2004, he was accused of stabbing to death a 24-year-old Mexican gangster Juan Amaya following a heated argument at Dekow Lane Apartments in Las Vegas, Nevada, which he considered an act of self-defense. In 2005, he was sentenced to a prison term of 4 to 12 years a Northern Nevada jail for manslaughter, but was granted parole and deported to the Philippines in 2010.

He is now currently based in his hometown in Bacolod City.

== In other media ==
Distrito's life story was featured in ABS-CBN show Rated K, hosted by Korina Sanchez.
