= Gido Babilonia =

Filipino basketball player

Vigildo "Gido" Babilonia
Personal information
- Born: August 19, 1966 Quezon, Philippines
- Died: January 14, 2007 (aged 40) Pasig, Philippines
- Listed height: 6 ft 6 in (1.98 m)
- Listed weight: 200 lb (91 kg)

Career information
- High school: Letran (Manila)
- College: UST
- PBA draft: 1990: 1st round, 4th overall pick
- Drafted by: Purefoods Hotdogs
- Playing career: 1990–2002
- Position: Center

Career history
- 1990: Purefoods Hotdogs
- 1991: Shell Rimula X Oilers
- 1992–94: 7-Up Uncolas/Pepsi Mega Bottlers
- 1995–96: San Miguel Beermen
- 1998–99: Pasig Blue Pirates
- 2000–01: Mobiline Phone Pals
- 2002: FedEx Express

Vigildo Quezon T. Babilonia (August 19, 1966 – January 14, 2007) was a Filipino basketball player in the Philippine Basketball Association (PBA).

== High School/College Career ==
Babilonia played for the Letran Squires under Coach Fred Reyes from 1981 to 1984. Despite the team's height advantage—four players standing above six feet—and a talented back court (Alfrancis Chua, Eric Enad, Elmer Bolabola, Raymond Reyes), the Squires lost to the Trinity College Baby Stallions in the 1984 NCAA junior division finals. He was named MVP of the NCAA junior division in 1984.

Together with Alfrancis Chua, he moved to the University of Santo Tomas and played with the Glowing Goldies where he was part of UST's “Triple Tower” in the 1980s, together with Bobby Jose and future UST Growling Tigers assistant coach Rabbi Tomacruz and dominated the UAAP.

== Professional career ==
After finishing his amateur career with a stint in the national team and as part of the PABL champion Magnolia Ice Cream. Gido turn pro in 1990 and was the only rookie of the talent-laden roster of Purefoods Hotdogs that season. He was the Hotdogs' third big man and would be sent in only when Jerry Codiñera and Jack Tanuan were to be relieve.

He was traded by Purefoods to Shell for the Turbo Chargers' first round pick in the 1991 PBA draft. Babilonia was hardly utilized and having to share exposure with Benjie Paras. Gido played for his third team the following year when Shell shipped him to Pepsi Hotshots, where he was reunited with his former coach Derrick Pumaren.

Gido was promoted to starting center at Pepsi following the trade which sent Manny Victorino to Ginebra and Abet Guidaben moving to Shell. Babilonia improved a lot in manning the slot. In 1994, Gido almost called it quits after a doctor diagnosed him of a heart problem. He was later given a clean bill of health enabling him to return to the Pepsi roster.

In 1995, he was traded by Pepsi to San Miguel in exchange for Kevin Ramas during the pre-season. Gido was a starting unit for the Beermen for two seasons.

He resurfaced in the newly formed Metropolitan Basketball Association in 1998. Gido was averaging in double figures for the first time in his pro career and was the Pasig Blue Pirates' top big man for two seasons. He made a comeback in the PBA in 2000 and played for Mobiline Phone Pals and in his final year with FedEx Express.

Babilonia had PBA career averages of 21.3 minutes, 4.7 points and 4.5 rebounds in a 10-year career.

== Personal life ==
His father is Pablito Babilonia. He was married to Narissa Cheryl, and they have 3 children, namely, Thomas Isiah, former Ateneo Blue Eagle cager Gideon Ira and Seth Isaac. He was close friends with the Pumaren brothers, Dindo, Franz and Derrick.

== Death ==
Babilonia was rushed to the hospital in the early hours of January 12, 2007 after he complained of chest pain and vomiting. Two days later, he died around 4:20 a.m. at the Medical City hospital in Pasig due to embolus (pulmonary) blood clot rupture. He was 40. According to his father, Pablito, he had not had a medical check-up for two years. Furthermore, his father added that he had been really dedicated to his work as assistant coach in the University of the East and his business (B&B Fish Dealer) that he overlooked his health.

His remains were laid to rest at the Holy Garden Memorial Park in Antipolo.
