= Andy Jao =

Filipino basketball sports journalist and league commissioner

Commissioner of the National Collegiate Athletic Association Basketball
- In office 2016–2017
- Preceded by: Bai Cristobal
- Succeeded by: Bai Cristobal

Commissioner of the University Athletic Association of the Philippines Basketball
- In office 2014–2015
- Preceded by: Chito Loyzaga
- Succeeded by: Rebo Saguisag
- In office 2011–2012
- Preceded by: Ato Badolato
- Succeeded by: Ato Badolato

8th Commissioner of the Philippine Basketball League
- In office 1989–1991
- Preceded by: Moying Martelino
- Succeeded by: Ogie Narvasa

Personal details
- Born: Andrew H. Jao, Jr. September 28, 1953 (age 73) Philippines
- Education: De La Salle University
- Occupation: Sports commentator and executive
- Basketball career

Career history

Coaching
- 1978–1980: U/Tex Wranglers (assistant)
- 1981–1982: San Miguel Beermen (assistant)
- 2000–2006: Red Bull Barako (assistant)

Career highlights
- As assistant coach: 6× PBA champion (1978 Open, 1980 Open, 1982 Invitational, 2001 Commissioner's, 2002 Commissioner's, 2005–06 Fiesta); As executive: PBA champion (2012 Governors); 2x MICAA Champion (1977, 1978)

Andrew H. Jao Jr. (born September 23, 1953) is a Filipino basketball executive and color commentator.

== Early life ==
Jao studied at the De La Salle University since elementary until college. He was a college buddy of Tommy Manotoc.

== Career ==
=== Coaching and executive ===
Jao started in 1978 in Solidmills (a team in MICAA) as its assistant manager. He also worked as assistant coach under Manotoc in U/Tex Wranglers and San Miguel Beermen. In the two-year existence of Manila Beer Brewmasters, he served as their manager and team scout. He also served as a consultant and assistant coach in Barako Bull Energizers from the start of the team until 2009, and the manager from 2009 until team disbandment. He also served as team consultant for Rain or Shine Elasto Painters (also the alternate governor and general manager until 2013), TNT Tropang Giga (with Norman Black as head coach), Meralco Bolts, Philippine national team, Ateneo and San Beda.

=== League commissioner ===
In mid 80s, Jao served as PBA's league Treasurer. He served as the PBL commissioner from 1989 to 1990. He served twice as UAAP Basketball Commissioner in 2011 and in 2014. He served as NCAA commissioner in 2016.

=== Panel ===
He started as a color commentator on PBA on Vintage Sports in 1982 until 1999. Then, he returned in 2009 in PBA coverages.

He was nicknamed "Dr. J" by Joe Cantada.

== Awards ==
Jao was inducted in the DLSAA Sports Hall of Fame in 2009.
