= Rey Cuenco =

Filipino basketball player

Reynaldo Cuenco
Personal information
- Born: March 17, 1960
- Died: August 15, 1996 (aged 36)
- Listed height: 6 ft 4 in (1.93 m)
- Listed weight: 175 lb (79 kg)

Career information
- College: Republic Central Colleges; Gregorio Araneta University Foundation
- PBA draft: 1986: 1st round1st overall
- Drafted by: Alaska Milkmen
- Playing career: 1986–1995
- Position: Power forward / center
- Number: 15, 18

Career history
- 1986: Alaska Milkmen
- 1987–1989: Shell Rimula X
- 1989–1992: Ginebra San Miguel
- 1992–1993: Shell Rimula X
- 1994–1995: Pepsi Mega

Career highlights
- 2× PBA champion (1991 First, 1992 First); PBA Most Improved Player (1990); PBA Mythical Second Team (1990)
Medals
Men's basketball
Representing Philippines
Asian Games
Silver medal – second place	1990 Beijing	Team

Reynaldo "Rey" Cuenco (March 17, 1960 – August 15, 1996) was a Filipino professional basketball player in the Philippine Basketball Association (PBA).

== Career highlights ==
A native of Pampanga, Cuenco became part of the Masagana 99 team in the PABL. He was also a NCC player under coach Ron Jacobs, which participated in the PBA during the 1984 season.

He was taken first overall by the Alaska Milkmen, then the newest team in the PBA, in 1986 rookie draft. After his stint with the Milkmen, he spent two seasons with Shell, and was traded to Añejo for the rights of Romeo Dela Rosa in 1989. Under the tutelage of playing-coach Robert Jaworski, he would enjoy superstar status and eventually become one of the best center/power forwards in the league.

== Playing for the National team ==
Cuenco was a member of the 1982 RP Youth Team that defeated China in the 1982 ABC Youth Championship gold medal match in Manila. He was also part of the all-pro squad that represented the Philippines in the 1990 Asian Games and won the silver medal.

== Death ==
Cuenco died of a liver ailment in 1996.
