= 1986 PBA All-Filipino Conference =

- Duration: July 6 – September 2, 1986
- TV partner(s): Vintage Sports (PTV)

Finals
- Champions: Tanduay Rhum Makers
- Runners-up: Ginebra San Miguel

PBA All-Filipino Conference chronology
- < 1985 1987 >

PBA conference chronology
- < 1986 Reinforced 1986 Open >

The 1986 Philippine Basketball Association (PBA) All-Filipino Conference was the second conference of the 1986 PBA season. It started on July 6 and ended on September 2. The tournament is an All-Filipino format, which doesn't require an import or a pure-foreign player for each team.

== Format ==
The following format will be observed for the duration of the conference:

- Single-round robin eliminations; 6 games per team; Teams are then seeded by basis on win–loss records.
- Top two teams automatically advance to the semifinals. Next four teams will dispute in the last two semifinals berth in a one round-robin quarterfinals (results from the elimination will be carried over).
- Semifinals will be two round robin affairs. The top two teams in the semifinals advance to the best of five finals. The last two teams dispute the third-place trophy in a best of five playoff.

== Elimination round ==
Pos	Team	W	L	PCT	GB	Qualification
1	Great Taste Coffee Makers	5	1	.833	—	Advance to semifinal round
2	Tanduay Rhum Makers	5	1	.833	—	Advance to semifinal round
3	Shell Helix Oilers	4	2	.667	1	Proceed to quarterfinal round
4	Manila Beer Brewmasters	3	3	.500	2	Proceed to quarterfinal round
5	Ginebra San Miguel	2	4	.333	3	Proceed to quarterfinal round
6	Alaska Milkmen	1	5	.167 (Note: Quarterfinal round berth playoff: Alaska 100–96 Philippine national team)	4	Proceed to quarterfinal round
7	Philippine national team (G)	1	5	.167	4	

(G) Guests

== Quarterfinal round berth playoff ==
Vintage

July 31

Alaska Milkmen 100, RP-Magnolia Quench Plus 96

The ULTRA, Pasig

== Quarterfinal round ==
Pos	Team	W	L	PCT	GB	Qualification
3	Ginebra San Miguel	5	4	.556	—	Semifinal round
4	Shell Helix Oilers	5	4	.556	—	Semifinal round
5	Alaska Milkmen	3	6	.333	2	
6	Manila Beer Brewmasters	3	6	.333	2	

== Semifinal round ==
Pos	Team	W	L	PCT	GB	Qualification
1	Tanduay Rhum Makers	4	2	.667 (Note: Head-to-head record: Tanduay 2–1 Ginebra)	—	Advance to the Finals
2	Ginebra San Miguel	4	2	.667	—	Advance to the Finals
3	Great Taste Coffee Makers	3	3	.500	1	Proceed to third place playoffs
4	Pilipinas Shell Oilers	1	5	.167	3	Proceed to third place playoffs

== Third place playoffs ==
Vintage

August 26

Pilipinas Shell Oilers 128, Great Taste Coffee Makers 125 (OT)
Pts: Marquez 26	Pts: Brown 52

The ULTRA, Pasig

Vintage

August 28

Pilipinas Shell Oilers 101, Great Taste Coffee Makers 110
Pts: Ravanes 24	Pts: Victorino 28

The ULTRA, Pasig

Vintage

August 31

Pilipinas Shell Oilers 110, Great Taste Coffee Makers 105

The ULTRA, Pasig

Vintage

September 2

Pilipinas Shell Oilers 96, Great Taste Coffee Makers 90
Shell wins series, 3–1

The ULTRA, Pasig

== Finals ==
Vintage

August 26

Tanduay Rhum Makers 86, Ginebra San Miguel 90

The ULTRA, Pasig

Vintage

August 28

Tanduay Rhum Makers 118, Ginebra San Miguel 115 (OT)

The ULTRA, Pasig

Vintage

August 31

Tanduay Rhum Makers 79, Ginebra San Miguel 74

The ULTRA, Pasig

Vintage

September 2

Tanduay Rhum Makers 93, Ginebra San Miguel 92
Tanduay wins series, 3–1

The ULTRA, Pasig
