= 1986 PBA All-Filipino Conference finals =

Basketball cup finals

Team	Coach	Wins
Tanduay Rhum Makers	Arturo Valenzona	3
Ginebra San Miguel	Robert Jaworski	1
- Dates: August 26 – September 2, 1986
- Television: Vintage Sports (PTV)
- Radio network: DZSR

PBA All-Filipino Conference finals chronology
- < 1985 1987 >

The 1986 PBA All-Filipino Conference finals was the best-of-5 basketball championship series of the 1986 PBA All-Filipino Conference, and the conclusion of the conference playoffs. The Tanduay Rhum Makers and Ginebra San Miguel played for the 34th championship contested by the league.

The Tanduay Rhum Makers won their finals series against Ginebra San Miguel, 3 games to 1, for their second title of the season.

== Qualification ==
Tanduay		Ginebra
Finished 5–1 (.833), tied for 1st	Eliminations	Finished 2–4 (.333), 4th
Outright semis	Quarterfinals	Finished 5–4 (.556)
Finished 4–2 (.667)	Semifinals	Finished 4–2 (.667)

== Series scoring summary ==
Team	Game 1	Game 2	Game 3	Game 4	Wins
Tanduay	86	118	79	93	3
Ginebra	90	115	74	92	1
Venue	ULTRA	ULTRA	ULTRA	ULTRA

== Games summary ==
=== Game 1 ===
Vintage

August 26

recap

Tanduay Rhum Makers 86, Ginebra San Miguel 90
Scoring by quarter: 25–19, 28–23, 9–28, 24–20
Pts: Freddie Hubalde 26	Pts: Terry Saldaña 31

The ULTRA, Pasig

The lead change hands several times early in the game, Abet Gutierrez sank the last basket to end the first quarter at 25–19 for Tanduay, a 10–0 blast by Ginebra in the second period levelled the count for the first time at 37-all but Freddie Hubalde teamed up with Ely Capacio as the Rhum Makers close out the first 24 minutes of play with an 11-point lead, 53–42.

Ginebra's Terry Saldaña was unstoppable in the third quarter and was able to drew Ramon Fernandez' third foul with 6:06 left, Ginebra regain the lead at 58–57, rookie Dondon Ampalayo and Francis Arnaiz kept up the barrage of baskets as Tanduay went scoreless for four minutes, the quarter ended with Ginebra enjoying an eight-point lead, 70–62, as the Rhum Makers scored a record-low 9 points in the third quarter. Tanduay came back in the fourth period and grabbed the lead for the last time at 85–83, Chito Loyzaga, Dondon Ampalayo and Francis Arnaiz combined for a 7–1 finishing run by Ginebra, Ampalayo scored inside the paint to push the Gins ahead from an 86-all deadlock, Francis Arnaiz' clutch jumper with four seconds remaining on their shotclock, sealed the outcome and a four-point victory.

=== Game 2 ===
Vintage

August 28

recap

Tanduay Rhum Makers 118, Ginebra San Miguel 115 (OT)
Scoring by quarter: 26–21, 30–30, 23–33, 27–22, Overtime: 12–9
Pts: Jose Yango 40	Pts: Francis Arnaiz 33

The ULTRA, Pasig

JB Yango scored his career-best 40 points for Tanduay while Francis Arnaiz fired 33 points for Ginebra as both teams played their hearts out in an exciting overtime game. Tanduay was ahead by five, 56–51 at halftime, but late in the third period, there was a brief scuffle among over-involved partisan fans ensued and a maze of confusion in which Terry Saldaña picked up the ball and hurried downcourt for a go-ahead basket as the Tanduay bench were up on their feet, the quarter ended in favor of Ginebra, 84–79.

The Rhum Makers regain the upper hand in the fourth quarter at 92–91 with seven minutes remaining and with the score reads 98–95 for Tanduay, Robert Jaworski unloaded his third triple for the night to tie the count at 98-all, two big baskets by Freddie Hubalde pushed the Rhum Makers to a four-point edge, 102–98. Francis Arnaiz took over the scoring chores for Ginebra after Jaworski fouled out with still 2:35 remaining, Arnaiz' basket tied the game at 106-all and forced overtime. In the extension period, Tanduay was up, 115–113, when Ginebra blew an opportunity to equalized on Dante Gonzalgo's missed shot with 43 seconds left, Onchie Dela Cruz made it a three-point lead for the Rhum Makers on a split free throw, the Ginebras call for timeout and on the next play, Arnaiz missed two attempts at the basket, Padim Israel delivered the insurance free throws for Tanduay with five seconds left.

=== Game 3 ===
Vintage

August 31

recap

Tanduay Rhum Makers 79, Ginebra San Miguel 74
Scoring by quarter: 13–11, 24–17, 20–21, 22–25

The ULTRA, Pasig

Tanduay took control of the ballgame in the second quarter and opened up a 15-point lead at 33–18 in a low-scoring contest. The Rhum Makers were ahead at 71–56 in the fourth period. The Ginebras made a last-ditch rally and close the gap to within three, 74–77, on Chito Loyzaga's triple, Padim Israel split his free throws off a foul from Dondon Ampalayo with seven seconds remaining to give Tanduay a four-point cushion, 78–74, the Gins called for timeout and Francis Arnaiz missed a long, triple attempt and he fouled Hubalde with two seconds left.

=== Game 4 ===
Vintage

September 2

Tanduay Rhum Makers 93, Ginebra San Miguel 92
Scoring by quarter: 19–25, 27–26, 23–19, 24–22
Tanduay wins series, 3–1

The ULTRA, Pasig

Ginebra led by 11 points twice, the last at 43–32. The Rhum Makers close in to within 46–51 at halftime, a quick five points by Ginebra early in the third period brought back the margin to 10 points, 56–46. Tanduay began tightening up on their defense and were only down by a point, 69–70, entering the final quarter.

Ramon Fernandez set up Victor Sanchez for a basket to put the Rhum Makers ahead, 77–76, another pass by Fernandez, this time on Ely Capacio, who completed a three-point play, gave the Rhum Makers a four-point edge at 80–76. Tanduay was up 91–85 on Fernandez' jumper with 1:33 remaining, but Ginebra playing coach Robert Jaworski wouldn't give up on the fight and scored five of the Gins' seven straight points, including a brilliant three-point play off Freddie Hubalde that turned the game around as Ginebra grabbed the upper hand at 92–91, a timeout was called by Tanduay and on the inbound play in the last 18 seconds, Jaworski almost completed a steal but Freddie Hubalde recovered the ball and took a court-to-court drive to draw a foul from Jaworski with six seconds left, Hubalde converted his two free throws to give the Rhum Makers a 93–92 lead with time down to six seconds. On the final play after a Ginebra timeout, Jaworski went straight to the hoop and muffed a hurried drive that didn't hit the rim, JB Yango hold on to the ball as the buzzer sounded.

1986 PBA All-Filipino Conference Champions

Tanduay Rhum Makers
Second title

== Rosters ==
Tanduay Rhum Makers roster
Players
Coaches

Pos.	No.	Nat.	Name	Ht.	Wt.
F	5	(Philippines)	Alex Clariño	6 ft 2 in (1.88 m)		Lyceum
G	7	(Philippines)	Antonio Torrente	6 ft 1 in (1.85 m)
G/F	8	(Philippines)	Anthony Dasalla	6 ft 2 in (1.88 m)		Far Eastern
G	9	(Philippines)	Ramon Dela Cruz	5 ft 11 in (1.80 m)		Philippine Christian
G	10	(Philippines)	Freddie Hubalde	6 ft 1 in (1.85 m)		Mapúa
F	12	(Philippines)	Victor Sanchez	6 ft 3 in (1.91 m)		Mapúa
F	13	(Philippines)	Abet Gutierrez	6 ft 2 in (1.88 m)		Ateneo de Davao
F/C	15	(Philippines)	Ely Capacio	6 ft 4 in (1.93 m)
F	17	(Philippines)	Padim Israel	6 ft 2 in (1.88 m)		Ateneo
C	19	(Philippines)	Ramon Fernandez	6 ft 4 in (1.93 m)		San Carlos
F	23	(Philippines)	Zaldy Latoza	6 ft 2 in (1.88 m)		TUA
F	24	(Philippines)	Jose Yango	6 ft 3 in (1.91 m)		San Beda
G/F	32	(Philippines)	Marlowe Jacutin	6 ft 1 in (1.85 m)		Visayas
G	42	(Philippines)	Willie Generalao	5 ft 9 in (1.75 m)		Visayas

Head coach

- (Philippines) Arturo Valenzona

Assistant coach(es)

Legend

- (C) Team captain
- Injured

Ginebra San Miguel roster
Players
Coaches

Pos.	#	POB	Name	Height	Weight	DOB (YYYY–MM–DD)	From
G/F	3	(Philippines)	Joey Marquez	6 ft 1 in (1.85 m)			Angeles
G	5	(Philippines)	Mukesh Advani	5 ft 11 in (1.80 m)			San Beda
F	6	(Philippines)	Dondon Ampalayo	6 ft 3 in (1.91 m)			USJ–R
G	7	(Philippines)	Robert Jaworski	6 ft 1 in (1.85 m)			UE
G	8	(Philippines)	Francis Arnaiz	5 ft 11 in (1.80 m)			Ateneo
G	9	(Philippines)	Leo Isaac	6 ft 1 in (1.85 m)			Mapúa
C	10	(Philippines)	Eduardo Ducut	6 ft 5 in (1.96 m)			Letran
C	11	(Philippines)	Romulo Mamaril	6 ft 6 in (1.98 m)			Mapúa
G/F	12	(Philippines)	Dante Gonzalgo	6 ft 2 in (1.88 m)			Lyceum
F	13	(Philippines)	Terry Saldaña	6 ft 3 in (1.91 m)			Letran
G	14	(Philippines)	Joey Loyzaga	6 ft 0 in (1.83 m)			San Beda
F	20	(Philippines)	Rolando Buhay	6 ft 3 in (1.91 m)			NCBA
F	41	(Philippines)	Chito Loyzaga	6 ft 3 in (1.91 m)			San Beda
G	77	(Philippines)	Rey Perez	6 ft 1 in (1.85 m)			Mapúa

Head coach

- (Philippines) Robert Jaworski

Assistant coach(es)

- (Philippines) Rino Salazar

Legend

- (C) Team captain
- (CI) Commissioner's Cup Import
- (GI) Governors' Cup Import
- (EI) EASL Import
- (DP) Unsigned draft pick
- (FA) Free agent
- (IN) Inactive
- (S) Suspended
- (R) Rookie
- Injured

== Broadcast notes ==
Game	Play-by-play	Analyst
Game 1	Joe Cantada	Joaqui Trillo
Game 2	Pinggoy Pengson	Quinito Henson
Game 3	Joe Cantada	Joaqui Trillo
Game 4	Pinggoy Pengson	Joaqui Trillo
