= 1986 PBA Reinforced Conference finals =

Philippine basketball tournament

Team	Coach	Wins
Tanduay Rhum Makers	Arturo Valenzona	4
Great Taste Coffee Makers	Baby Dalupan	2
- Dates: June 5–17, 1986
- Television: Vintage Sports (PTV)
- Radio network: DZSR

PBA Reinforced Conference finals chronology
- < 1985 1987 >

The 1986 PBA Reinforced Conference finals was the best-of-7 basketball championship series of the 1986 PBA Reinforced Conference, and the conclusion of the conference playoffs. The Tanduay Rhum Makers and Great Taste Coffee Makers played for the 33rd championship contested by the league.

Tanduay Rhum Makers wins their first-ever PBA title after 11 long years with a 4-2 series victory against Great Taste Coffee Makers.

== Qualification ==
Great Taste		Tanduay
Finished 8–2 (.800), 1st	Eliminations	Finished 6–4 (.600), tied for 2nd
Finished 12–6 (.667)	Semifinals	Finished 12–6 (.667)

== Series scoring summary ==
Team	Game 1	Game 2	Game 3	Game 4	Game 5	Game 6	Wins
Tanduay	117	121	117	112	106	132	4
Great Taste	114	126	110	111	111	109	2
Venue	ULTRA	ULTRA	ULTRA	ULTRA	ULTRA	ULTRA

== Games summary ==
=== Game 1 ===
Vintage

June 5

Tanduay Rhum Makers 117, Great Taste Coffee Makers 114
Scoring by quarter: 32-30, 29-27, 24-29, 32-28
Pts: Andre McKoy 41	Pts: Michael Holton 47

The ULTRA, Pasig

Both teams battle to several lead changes in the first two quarters, an 8-2 run by Tanduay in the closing minutes of the second quarter gave them a 61-57 edge at halftime. The Rhum Makers went up by nine, 75-66 in the third period, but Great Taste countered with a 14-2 run to take the lead back, 80-77. The game was last tied at 109-all, Jayvee Yango's three-point play gave Tanduay a 112-109 lead with 1:38 to go, the Coffee Makers were down by two points twice, 112-114, after Michael Holton converted a triple, and 114-116, in an exciting finish, Great Taste had a chance to tie the count after a split free throw from the Rhum Makers but Andre McKoy stole the ball from Holton with 14 seconds remaining to prevent a possible game-tying three pointer.

=== Game 2 ===
Vintage

June 8

Tanduay Rhum Makers 121, Great Taste Coffee Makers 126 (OT)
Scoring by quarter: 35-25, 19-20, 36-38, 22-29, Overtime: 9-14
Pts: Rob Williams 52	Pts: Michael Holton 36

The ULTRA, Pasig

Ricardo Brown sparked a rally for Great Taste in the fourth quarter, the Coffee Makers tied the count in a long while at 110-all after the Rhum Makers led all throughout for three quarters, Padim Israel's semi-hook shot gave Tanduay a 112-110 lead but Ricardo Brown forces overtime on a jumper with 40 seconds left in regulation, the Rhum Makers had a chance to win outright but Willie Generalao missed on his final attempt with two seconds to go. In the extension period, Great Taste took a commanding six-point lead three times, the last at 124-118, Rob Williams hit a triple to put the Rhum Makers within three, 121-124, Williams missed two three-point attempts to tie the game and a long, outlet pass and an easy lay-up for Brown, who knocked in eight points in overtime, completed a come-from-behind victory for Great Taste.

=== Game 3 ===
Vintage

June 10

Tanduay Rhum Makers 117, Great Taste Coffee Makers 110
Scoring by quarter: 27-32, 29-31, 29-24, 32-23
Pts: Andre McKoy 38	Pts: Jeff Collins 37

The ULTRA, Pasig

The Coffee Makers raced to a 17-point lead in the third quarter, 81-64, with 6:20 remaining and seems headed for an easy victory. After a timeout by Tanduay, the Rhum Makers regroup and rallied with a 21-6 splurge and were only down by two, 85-87, going into the final quarter. The fourth period turned nightmarish for the Coffee Makers as Tanduay opened up a ten-point spread at 103-93, Jeff Collins tried to rally Great Taste back with six straight points to trimmed the deficit at 99-103. Freddie Hubalde got away with a basket that put the Rhum Makers safely ahead, 113-107, in the final minute.

=== Game 4 ===
Vintage

June 12

Tanduay Rhum Makers 112, Great Taste Coffee Makers 111
Scoring by quarter: 21-31, 36-21, 29-33, 26-26
Pts: Andre McKoy 41	Pts: Michael Holton 46

The ULTRA, Pasig

Great Taste was up, 52-41, in the second quarter when Tanduay came through with a 16-0 bomb for a 57-52 halftime lead. In the final period, the Coffee Makers led, 110-103, when the Rhum Makers worked their way back to within two points, 108-110 with 1:25 left, Abe King split his charities in the next play for a 111-108 Great Taste lead with 56 seconds remaining, Andre McKoy of Tanduay then hit a jumper to narrow the gap, Willie Pearson of Great Taste missed a jumper and Jayvee Yango pulled down the rebound, McKoy fished a foul off Pearson and sank two crucial free throws with 12 seconds to go, Great Taste coach Baby Dalupan opted to call a timeout earlier when McKoy was about to take his charities and the Coffee Makers inbounded from the backcourt, Michael Holton's jumper from the left side of the court was too long and Jayvee Yango grabbed the ball and pass it to Rob Williams who threw the ball in the air, giving Tanduay a 3-1 series lead and a win away from its first championship.

=== Game 5 ===
Vintage

June 15

recap

Tanduay Rhum Makers 106, Great Taste Coffee Makers 111
Scoring by quarter: 21-21, 22-29, 26-28, 37-33
Pts: Rob Williams 46	Pts: Jeff Collins 24

The ULTRA, Pasig

From a tight first period resulting to a standoff at 21-all, Great Taste grabbed the upper hand in the second and third quarter. Six straight points by Tanduay at the start of the fourth quarter cut the Coffee Makers' deficit to three, 75-78. Great Taste suddenly pulled away with a 16-point spread at 103-87, Rob Williams tried to rally the Rhum Makers with successive three-pointers in the last five minutes but fell short as Great Taste hang on with a five-point win.

=== Game 6 ===
Vintage

June 17

recap

Tanduay Rhum Makers 132, Great Taste Coffee Makers 109
Scoring by quarter: 30-17, 31-30, 41-34, 30-28
Pts: Rob Williams 50	Pts: Ricardo Brown 34
Tanduay wins series, 4-2

The ULTRA, Pasig

Right from the opening buzzer, Tanduay seized control and never allowed the Coffee Makers to even take a lead for once, the Rhum Makers led by as much as 27 points in the third quarter and continued its dominance in the final period. Coach Arturo Valenzona was already seen being given a victory ride halfway through the fourth quarter, Tanduay were up by 22 points, 114-92, and the Coffee Makers came no closer than 17 points at 100-117. Rob Williams punctuated the highlight reel of Tanduay's first championship by nailing a three-pointer at the buzzer.

1986 PBA Reinforced Conference Champions

Tanduay Rhum Makers
First title

== Rosters ==
Tanduay Rhum Makers roster
Players
Coaches

Pos.	No.	Nat.	Name	Ht.	Wt.
G	7	(Philippines)	Antonio Torrente	6 ft 1 in (1.85 m)
G/F	8	(Philippines)	Anthony Dasalla	6 ft 2 in (1.88 m)		Far Eastern
G	9	(Philippines)	Ramon Dela Cruz	5 ft 11 in (1.80 m)		Philippine Christian
G	10	(Philippines)	Freddie Hubalde	6 ft 1 in (1.85 m)		Mapúa
F	12	(Philippines)	Victor Sanchez	6 ft 3 in (1.91 m)		Mapúa
F	13	(Philippines)	Abet Gutierrez	6 ft 2 in (1.88 m)		Ateneo de Davao
F/C	15	(Philippines)	Ely Capacio	6 ft 4 in (1.93 m)
F	17	(Philippines)	Padim Israel	6 ft 2 in (1.88 m)		Ateneo
C	19	(Philippines)	Ramon Fernandez	6 ft 4 in (1.93 m)		San Carlos
G/F	21	(United States)	Rob Williams (I)	6 ft 2 in (1.88 m)		Houston
F	24	(Philippines)	Jose Yango	6 ft 3 in (1.91 m)		San Beda
G/F	32	(Philippines)	Marlowe Jacutin	6 ft 1 in (1.85 m)		Visayas
G	33	(United States)	Andre McKoy (I)	6 ft 2 in (1.88 m)		UW–Whitewater
G	42	(Philippines)	Willie Generalao	5 ft 9 in (1.75 m)		Visayas

Head coach

- (Philippines) Arturo Valenzona

Assistant coach(es)

- (Philippines) Derrick Pumaren

Legend

- (C) Team captain
- (I) Import
- Injured

Great Taste Coffee roster
Players
Coaches

Pos.	No.	Nat.	Name	Ht.	Wt.
C	1	(Philippines)	Manny Victorino	6 ft 5 in (1.96 m)		José Rizal
G/F	5	(Philippines)	Steve Watson	6 ft 2 in (1.88 m)		Ateneo
F	6	(Philippines)	Abe King	6 ft 3 in (1.91 m)		San Beda
C	7	(Philippines)	Joel Banal	6 ft 5 in (1.96 m)		Mapúa
C	10	(Philippines)	Carlson Samlani	6 ft 5 in (1.96 m)		San Sebastian
G	11	(Philippines)	Jaime Manansala	5 ft 11 in (1.80 m)		UE
G	12	(Philippines)	Rafael Sison	6 ft 1 in (1.85 m)		Ateneo de Davao
G/F	14	(United States)	Michael Holton (I)	6 ft 3 in (1.91 m)		California
G	15	(Philippines)	Aaron Torres	5 ft 10 in (1.78 m)		UE
G	22	(Philippines)	Matthew Gaston	6 ft 1 in (1.85 m)		Ateneo
G	23	(United States)	Ricardo Brown	5 ft 11 in (1.80 m)		Pepperdine
G/F	24	(United States)	Jeff Collins (I)	6 ft 3 in (1.91 m)		UNLV
F	29	(Philippines)	Bernardo Carpio	6 ft 3 in (1.91 m)		Ateneo
F	33	(United States)	Willie Pearson	6 ft 1 in (1.85 m)		Chaminade

Head coach

- (Philippines) Baby Dalupan

Assistant coach(es)

Legend

- (C) Team captain
- (I) Import
- Injured

== Broadcast notes ==
Game	Play-by-play	Analyst
Game 1		
Game 2		
Game 3		
Game 4		
Game 5		
Game 6		
