= Alaska Aces (PBA) all-time roster =

The following is a list of players who have appeared at least in one game for the Alaska Aces PBA franchise.

== A ==
Name	Position	School/University	Nickname	Years with Alaska		No. of seasons	Ref.
Name	Position	School/University	Nickname	From	To	No. of seasons	Ref.
Aaron Aban	SG / SF	Letran	Triple A	2006	2008	2	
Johnny Abarrientos	PG	Far Eastern	Flying A	1993	2001	8	
Dennis Abbatuan	F	José Rizal		1986	1987	2	
Calvin Abueva	SF / PF	San Sebastian	The Beast	2012	2018	6	
Ben Adamos	PF / C	UPHSD		2021	2022	1	
Alexander Adams (Import)	F	Azusa Pacific		1987		1	
Bogs Adornado	SF	UST	Mr. Nice Guy	1987		1	
Peter Aguilar	F	TUA		1991		1	
Maverick Ahanmisi	PG / SG	Minnesota		2019	2022	3	
Dino Aldeguer	PG	De La Salle		2000		1	
Teddy Alfarero	PF / C	De La Salle		1986	1987	2	
Don Allado	PF	De La Salle		1999	2006	5	
Ponky Alolor	F	Visayas		1986	1988	3	
Eric Altamirano	PG	Philippines		1989		1	
Paul Alvarez	SF	San Sebastian	Mr. Excitement	1989	1992	4	
Rich Alvarez	PF	Ateneo		2005	2006	1	
Dondon Ampalayo	F	USJ–R	The Magic Man	1993	1995	3	
Yutien Andrada	F	La Salle		2017	2020	4	
Josel Angeles	F	Lyceum		1993		1	
Alex Araneta	C	Ateneo		1991	1995	5	
John Arigo	SG / SF	North Florida	The Arsenal	2001	2003	3	
Leo Avenido	G	Far Eastern		2014		1	
Olu Ashaolu (Import)	PF	Oregon		2021	2022	1	
MJ Ayaay	G	Lyceum		2019	2020	2	

== B ==
Name	Position	School/University	Nickname	Years with Alaska		No. of seasons	Ref.
Name	Position	School/University	Nickname	From	To	No. of seasons	Ref.
Gideon Babilonia	C	Ateneo		2018		1	
Dicky Bachmann	C / PF	De La Salle		1993	1999	7	
Noy Baclao	C / PF	Ateneo	Mr. Swat	2014	2019	5	
Terrance Badgett	F	Nebraska		2001		1	
Rensy Bajar	PG	San Beda		2002	2009	6	
Cyrus Baguio	SG /SF	UST	Skyrus	2010	2016	6	
Woodrow Balani	F	Visayas		1986		1	
Gab Banal	SF	Mapúa		2021		1	
Noli Banate	C	Mindanao		1986		1	
Chris Banchero	PG / SG	Seattle Pacific		2014	2019	5	
Mac Baracael	F	Far Eastern	Kalibre	2011	2013	2	
Kenny Battle	SF	Illinois		1993		1	
Nic Belasco	SF / PF	Notre Dame de Namur		2006; 2012	2007; 2014	4	
Norman Black Import)	G / F	Saint Joseph's	Mr. 100%	1986		1	
Willie Bland (Import)	F	Louisiana Tech		1988		1	
Cris Bolado	C	National-U	Jumbo Bolado	1994	1997	4	
Dexter Boney	G	UNLV		2001		1	
Ken Bono	PF / C	Adamson		2007	2008	1	
David Boone (Import)	C	Marquette		1988		1	
Mark Borboran	SF / PF	UE		2008	2010	3	
Odell Bradley (Import)	F	IUPUI		2005	2006	1	
Marques Bragg (Import)	PF	Providence		1994		1	
Rodney Brondial	PF / C	Adamson		2019	2021	3	
Taylor Browne	SG	UBC		2021	2022	1	
Monty Buckley (Import)	F	California		1998		1	
Ryan Buenafe	SG / SF	Ateneo		2013	2014	1	
Paolo Bugia	C	Ateneo		2011	2016	5	
Allyn Bulanadi	SG	San Sebastian		2022		1	
Michael Burtscher	PF / C	Clearwater Christian		2009	2011	1	

== C ==
Name	Position	School/University	Nickname	Years with Alaska		No. of seasons	Ref.
Name	Position	School/University	Nickname	From	To	No. of seasons	Ref.
Boy Cabahug	SG	Visayas		1989	1990	2	
Junjun Cabatu	SF / PF	La Salle		2007	2008	1	
Brandon Cablay	PG	Vanguard		2003; 2009	2006; 2012	8	
Ronnie Cahanding	G / F	Adamson		1992		1	
Don Camaso	PF /SF	Metro Manila College		2003		1	
Antonio Campbell (Import)	PF	Ohio		2018		1	
Chris Carrawell (Import)	G / F	Duke		2002	2003	2	
Johnedel Cardel	PG	La Salle		1993	1994	2	
Jeffrey Cariaso	SG	Sonoma State	The Jet	1995; 2004	1997; 2010	9	
JVee Casio	PG	De La Salle		2012	2021	9	
Merwin Castelo	G	San Beda		1994	1997	4	
Alvin Castro		De La Salle		2003		1	
Harmon Codinera	F	Far Eastern		1990		1	
D.J. Covington (Import)	PF / C	VMI		2015		1	
Sean Chambers (Import)	F	Cal Poly		1991	2001	11	
Carlos Clark (Import)	SG	Ole Miss		1990		1	
Tim Coloso	G	Colegio de San Juan de Letran		1987	1988	2	
Edgardo Cordero	F	UST		1990		1	
Mike Cortez	PG	La Salle	The Cool Cat	2003	2008	5	
Eddie Cox (Import)	F	University of North Dakota		1988		1	
Winston Crite (Import)	PF	Texas A&M	The Human Eraser	1992		1	
Carl Bryan Cruz	F	Far Eastern	C.B.C	2016	2019	3	
Rey Cuenco	PF / C	De La Salle Araneta		1986		1	
Bonbon Custodio	SG	UE	The Bonfire	2010	2012	2	

== D ==
Name	Position	School/University	Nickname	Years with Alaska		No. of seasons	Ref.
Name	Position	School/University	Nickname	From	To	No. of seasons	Ref.
Albert David	F	Letran		1998		1	
Devin Davis (Import)	C	Miami (Ohio)		1998	1999	2	
Chris Daniels (Import)	C	Texas A&M–Corpus Christi		2019		1	
Richard del Rosario	F	De La Salle		2003		1	
Tony dela Cruz	SF / PF	UC Irvine		2005	2017	11	
Kelvin dela Peña	PG / SG	Mapúa		2008	2010	2	
Rome dela Rosa	SF / SG	San Beda		2014	2016	2	
Nani Demigillo	C	San Sebastian		1993		1	
Leon Derricks	F / C	University of Detroit		2004		1	
Joe Devance	F	UTEP	The Speaker, JDV	2008	2011	3	
Michael DiGregorio	SG / PG	McKendree		2020	2022	2	
Aries Dimaunahan	PG	UST		2011		1	
Rudy Distrito	SG	UE	The Destroyer	1986		1	
Muntrelle Dobbins (Import)	F / C	Little Rock		2002		1	
Rob Dozier (Import)	PF	Memphis		2013 2016	2014 2016	3	
Don Dulay	PG	El Camino	Double D	2011		1	
Rob Duat		Menlo		2002	2003	2	
Kenneth Duremdes	SG / SF	Adamson	The Captain Marbel	1997	2002	5	

== E ==
Name	Position	School/University	Nickname	Years with Alaska		No. of seasons	Ref.
Name	Position	School/University	Nickname	From	To	No. of seasons	Ref.
Jerry Eaves (Import)	PG	Louisville		1986		1	
Kevin Eboña	PF / C	Far Eastern	Barkley	2020	2021	2	
Shane Edwards (Import)	SF	Little Rock		2016		1	
Rosell Ellis (Import)	SF / PF	McNeese State	Ro	2007 2009		2	
Sam Eman	C	Mindanao		2010	2016	7	
Simon Enciso	PG / SG	Notre Dame de Namur		2017	2019	3	
Gabby Espinas	PF	Philippine Christian	The Black Spiderman	2012	2015	3	
Elmer Espiritu	SF / PF	UE		2010	2011	1	
Kenny Evans	G	San Francisco State		2001		1	
Chris Exciminiano	SG / PG	Far Eastern	The X-Factor	2013	2019	6	

== F ==
Name	Position	School/University	Nickname	Years with Alaska		No. of seasons	Ref.
Name	Position	School/University	Nickname	From	To	No. of seasons	Ref.
Bryan Faundo	C / PF	Colegio de San Juan de Letran		2022		1	
E.J. Feihl	C	Adamson		2002	2004	2	
Boyet Fernandez	PG	CSA–Bacolod		1997		1	
John Ferriols	PF	USJ–R		2006	2010	5	
Larry Fonacier	SG / SF	Ateneo	The Baby Face Assassin	2008	2010	2	
Isaac Fontaine	SG			2003		1	
Jason Forte (Import)	G	Southern Mississippi		2012		1	
Raymund Fran	F	UST		1992	1993	2	
Bernzon Franco	F	Philippine Christian		2004	2006	2	
Rodney Fuller (Import)	G	California State		1993		1	

== G ==
Name	Position	School/University	Nickname	Years with Alaska		No. of seasons	Ref.
Name	Position	School/University	Nickname	From	To	No. of seasons	Ref.
Bryan Gahol	F	Philippines		2000	2002	3	
Sean Gay (Import)	G	Cal Poly San Luis Obispo		1994		1	
Abel Galliguez	PG	John Brown		2015	2020	5	
Niño Gelig	SG / SF	UST		2008	2012	4	
Rhoel Gomez	G / F	Cebu Central Colleges		1991	1998	8	
Wesley Gonzales	SF / SG	Ateneo	Wild Wild Wes	2011	2012	1	
Sylvester Gray (Import)	SF	Memphis	Black Rambo	1997		1	
Abet Guidaben	C / PF	USJ–R		1989		1	

== H ==
Name	Position	School/University	Nickname	Years with Alaska		No. of seasons	Ref.
Name	Position	School/University	Nickname	From	To	No. of seasons	Ref.
Derrick Hamilton (Import)	SF	Southern Miss	The Glue	1995	1996	2	
Mike Harris (Import)	F	Rice		2018		1	
Nap Hatton	F	San Sebastian		1991		1	
Bong Hawkins	F	UPHSD	The Hawk	1993; 2005	2000; 2006	9	
Marvin Hayes	SF	José Rizal		2010	2012	2	
James Head	F	Eastern Michigan		2002		1	
LaDontae Henton (Import)	SF	Providence		2016 2017		2	
Robbie Herndon	SF / SG	San Francisco State		2019	2022	3	
Kevin Holland (Import)	F / C	DePaul		1997		1	
Dondon Hontiveros	SG / SF	Cebu	Cebuano Hotshot	2012	2017	5	
Franko House (Import)	SF / PF	Ball State		2019		1	
Reynel Hugnatan	PF	Manila		2005	2011	7	

== I ==
Name	Position	School/University	Nickname	Years with Alaska		No. of seasons	Ref.
Name	Position	School/University	Nickname	From	To	No. of seasons	Ref.
RK Ilagan	PG	San Sebastian		2021	2022	1	

== J ==
Name	Position	School/University	Nickname	Years with Alaska		No. of seasons	Ref.
Name	Position	School/University	Nickname	From	To	No. of seasons	Ref.
Damion James (Import)	SF / SG	Texas		2015		1	
RJ Jazul	PG / SG	Letran		2012	2017	5	
Nino Johnson (Import)	F	Southeast Missouri State		2019		1	
Rob Johnson	G	Bellevue		2004	2005	1	
Bobby Jose	F	UST		1992		1	
Poch Juinio	PF / C	Philippines		1994; 2006	2000; 2008	9	

== K ==
Name	Position	School/University	Nickname	Years with Alaska		No. of seasons	Ref.
Name	Position	School/University	Nickname	From	To	No. of seasons	Ref.
Andrew Kennedy (Import)	SF	University of Virginia		1988		1	
Kirk King (Import)	SF	UConn		2000		1	
Donnie Ray Koonce (Import)	F / SG	Charlotte		1986		1	

== L ==
Name	Position	School/University	Nickname	Years with Alaska		No. of seasons	Ref.
Name	Position	School/University	Nickname	From	To	No. of seasons	Ref.
Jojo Lastimosa	SG	USJ-R	Mr. 4th Quarter	1991–1999 2002		10	
Eddie Laure	SF	Adamson		2006; 2012	2008; 2014	4	
Dwight Lago	SF	De La Salle		1997		1	
Rey Lazaro	F	Far Eastern	Inside Artist	1988	1989	2	
Marcus Liberty (Import)	F / C	Illinois		2000		1	
Braulio Lim	F	UE		1998	2000	3	
Frankie Lim	PG	San Beda		1986	1992	7	
Carl Lott (Import)	F	Texas Christian		1989		1	
Joey Loyzaga	SG	San Beda		1998	2000	3	
Christian Luanzon	PF	UST		2006	2008	2	

== M ==
Name	Position	School/University	Nickname	Years with Alaska		No. of seasons	Ref.
Name	Position	School/University	Nickname	From	To	No. of seasons	Ref.
Marion Magat	PF / C	National University		2015	2018	3	
Loreto Manaog	G / F			1990		1	
Vic Manuel	PF	PSBA	Muscle Man	2014	2020	6	
Ric-Ric Marata	PG	Southwestern-U		1989	1990	2	
Jaycee Marcelino	PG	Lyceum		2020	2022	2	
Joey Marquez	G	Angeles		1987		1	
Tee McClary (Import)	G	Jacksonville		2005		1	
Wendell McKines (Import)	PF	New Mexico State		2013		1	
Eric Menk	C / PF	Lake Superior State	Major Pain	2014	2016	2	
Willie Miller	PG / SG	Letran	The Thriller	2006	2010	5	
Rodney Monroe (Import)	G	North Carolina State		1993		1	
Keith Morrison (Import)	G	Washington State		1986		1	

== N ==
Name	Position	School/University	Nickname	Years with Alaska		No. of seasons	Ref.
Name	Position	School/University	Nickname	From	To	No. of seasons	Ref.
Eton Navarro	F	San Sebastian		1991		1	
Tony Neal (Import)	F / C	Cal State Fullerton		1987		1	
Philip Newton	G			2002		1	
Miguel Noble	F	Utica		2002	2003	2	

== O ==
Name	Position	School/University	Nickname	Years with Alaska		No. of seasons	Ref.
Name	Position	School/University	Nickname	From	To	No. of seasons	Ref.
Jon Ordonio	G	The Master's College		2001	2004	3	
Michael Otto	C	Far Eastern		1997		1	

== P ==
Name	Position	School/University	Nickname	Years with Alaska		No. of seasons	Ref.
Name	Position	School/University	Nickname	From	To	No. of seasons	Ref.
Stephen Padilla	G	Visayas		2003	2006	3	
Jake Pascual	PF	San Beda	The Snake	2016	2019	3	
Ronald Pascual	SF / SG	San Sebastian		2017	2018	1	
Julius Pasculado	G	Wilbur Wright		2011	2012	1	
Willie Pearson	G	Chaminade		1988	1989	2	
Ali Peek	PF / C	Saint Mary's	The Mountain Man	2001	2004	3	
Giovanni Pineda	PF / C	Adamson		1995	1996	2	
Davon Potts	SG	San Beda		2017	2019	2	
Dong Polistico	C	Letran		1988	1992	5	
Rey Publico	PF	Letran		2020	2022	2	
Bryant Punzalan	C	Far Eastern		1997		1	

== Q ==
Name	Position	School/University	Nickname	Years with Alaska		No. of seasons	Ref.
Name	Position	School/University	Nickname	From	To	No. of seasons	Ref.
Eugene Quilban	G	San Sebastian		1991		1	
JR Quiñahan	PF / C	Visayas	Baby Shaq, Extra Rice, Inc.	2007	2008	1	

== R ==
Name	Position	School/University	Nickname	Years with Alaska		No. of seasons	Ref.
Name	Position	School/University	Nickname	From	To	No. of seasons	Ref.
Kevin Racal	SF	Letran	K-Racs	2015	2022	6	
Kevin Ramas	C	Mapúa		1996	2001	6	
Aldrech Ramos	F / C	Far Eastern		2013	2014	1	
Reynaldo Ramos	F	TUA		1986		1	
Biboy Ravanes	G / F	Cebu		1988	1991	4	
Ricky Relosa	F / C	Mapúa	Double R	1986	1989	4	
Enrique Reyes	F	Ateneo de Manila		2001	2002		
Jay-R Reyes	PF / C	Philippines		2011	2012	1	
Jun Reyes	G	Ateneo de Manila		1992	1999	8	
Raphy Reyes	PG	UE		2012	2014	2	
Ron Riley (Import)	SF	Arizona State		2001		1	
Topex Robinson	PG	San Sebastian		2010	2011	1	
Dondi Roque	G / F	UP Diliman		1989		1	

== S ==
Name	Position	School/University	Nickname	Years with Alaska		No. of seasons	Ref.
Name	Position	School/University	Nickname	From	To	No. of seasons	Ref.
Marte Saldaña	PG	Far Eastern		1986	1988	3	
Terry Saldaña	PF / C	UST		1988		1	
Joel Santos	F	San Beda		1989		1	
Rodney Santos	SG / SF	San Sebastian		1997	2002	7	
Allan Sasan	G	Cebu		1992	1993	2	
Tony Simms	F	Boston		1990		1	
Dickey Simpkins (Import)	PF	Providence		2005		1	
Diamon Simpson (Import)	PF / C	Saint Mary's		2010 2018		2	
McKinley Singleton (Import)	G	UAB		1987		1	
Dale Singson	PG / SG	UST		2006	2007	1	
Jose Slaughter (Import)	SG	Portland		1987		1	
Bong Solomon	PF	San Sebastian		1992	1994	3	
Ervin Sotto	C	Saint Francis of Assisi		2008	2012	2	
Mark St. Fort (Import)	G / F	Warner		2022		1	
Alec Stockton	G	Far Eastern		2021	2022	1	

== T ==
Name	Position	School/University	Nickname	Years with Alaska		No. of seasons	Ref.
Name	Position	School/University	Nickname	From	To	No. of seasons	Ref.
Yousef Taha	C	Mapúa		2021	2022	1	
Jack Tanuan	PF / C	Far Eastern		1997		1	
Eugene Tejada	PF / C			2003	2005	2	
Alvin Teng	PF / C	Arellano	The Robocop	2002		1	
Jeron Teng	F / SG	De La Salle		2017	2022	4	
LA Tenorio	PG	Ateneo	Tinyente	2008	2012	5	
Hans Thiele	PF / C	UE		2010	2011	1	
Sonny Thoss	C	James Cook	The Boss	2004	2020	15	
Richie Ticzon	PG	Ateneo		2001	2002	2	
Adonis Tierra	G	FEATI		1987		1	
Mike Tolomia	PG / SG	Far Eastern		2021	2022	1	
Macario Torres	C	Far Eastern		1990	1991	2	
Abu Tratter	PF / C	La Salle		2019	2022	3	
Romeo Travis (Import)	PF	University of Akron		2015		1	
Arnie Tuadles	SF / PF	Visayas		1986		1	

== V ==
Name	Position	School/University	Nickname	Years with Alaska		No. of seasons	Ref.
Name	Position	School/University	Nickname	From	To	No. of seasons	Ref.
Joseph Valdez	C	Adamson		1998	1999	2	
Naning Valenciano	G/F	USLS		1986	1988	3	
Josh Vanlandingham	SF /SG	Pacific Lutheran		2014	2016	2	
Elpidio Villamin	F / C	Far Eastern	The Bicolano Superman	1987	1990	4	

== W ==
Name	Position	School/University	Nickname	Years with Alaska		No. of seasons	Ref.
Name	Position	School/University	Nickname	From	To	No. of seasons	Ref.
Henry Walker (Import)	SF / SG	Kansas State		2014		1	
James Walkvist	C			1999	2001	3	
Justin Watts (Import)	SG / SF	North Carolina		2019		1	
LD Williams (Import)	SG / SF	Wake Forest		2011		1	
Ajani Williams (Import)	F / C			2002		1	
Willy Wilson	SF / PF	De La Salle	The Double W	2004	2006	2	
Francois Wise (Import)	PF	Long Beach State		1987		1	

== Y ==
Name	Position	School/University	Nickname	Years with Alaska		No. of seasons	Ref.
Name	Position	School/University	Nickname	From	To	No. of seasons	Ref.
Glen Yap	F	Adamson		2000	2002	2	
Galen Young (Import)	SF / PF	North Carolina		2004 2009		2	
