= 1980 Tanduay Esquires season =

- Head coach: Tito Eduque

Open Conference results
- Record: 4–14 (22.2%)
- Place: N/A
- Playoff finish: N/A

Invitational Championship results
- Record: 0–0
- Place: N/A
- Playoff finish: N/A

All Filipino Conference results
- Record: 12–9 (57.1%)
- Place: 3rd
- Playoff finish: Semifinals

Tanduay Esquires seasons

The 1980 Tanduay Esquires season was the 6th season of the franchise in the Philippine Basketball Association (PBA).

== Occurrences ==
Tanduay's seven-foot import Paul Zaretsky sprained his ankle in a workout and as a result, Tanduay lost their first game of the season to Honda, playing with only one import, Kevin Cluess. Zaretsky never got a chance to play and was sent home in favor of 6-8 Odell Ball, a former center of Marquette University.

== Semifinal stint ==
For the third straight season, Tanduay advances into the round of four of the league's most prestigious tournament, the All-Filipino. The Esquires posted a 5-4 and 3-2 won-loss slates in the eliminations and quarterfinal phase. In the one-round robin among the four semifinalist, the Esquires lost to unbeaten Crispa Redmanizers, 98-101, in the last playing date on December 4 as they failed to create a three-way tie and a playoff with Toyota for the second finals berth. Tanduay placed third by winning their series against Gilbey's Gin.

== Win–loss record vs opponents ==
Teams	Win	Loss	1st (Open)	3rd (All-Filipino)
Galleon Shippers	2	1	1-1	1-0
Gilbey’s Gin	5	4	0-2	5-2
Great Taste / Presto	1	2	0-2	1-0
Honda	2	1	1-1	1-0
Royal / San Miguel	3	1	1-1	2-0
Tefilin	0	3	0-2	0-1
Toyota Tamaraws	0	5	0-2	0-3
U-Tex Wranglers	2	2	0-2	2-0
Walk Tall / Crispa	1	4	1-1	0-3
Total	16	23	4-14	12-9

== Roster ==
Tanduay Esquires roster
Players
Coaches

Pos.	No.	Nat.	Name	Ht.	Wt.
F	2	(Philippines)	Abelardo Monzon	6 ft 1 in (1.85 m)		Letran
G	7	(Philippines)	Roberto Dela Rosa	5 ft 11 in (1.80 m)		Far Eastern
F	10	(Philippines)	Victor Sanchez	6 ft 3 in (1.91 m)		Mapúa
G/F	11	(Philippines)	Jaime Manansala	5 ft 11 in (1.80 m)		UE
F	13	(Philippines)	Alberto Gutierrez	6 ft 2 in (1.88 m)		Ateneo de Davao
F/C	15	(Philippines)	Ely Capacio	6 ft 4 in (1.93 m)
F	16	(Philippines)	Ricardo Cleofas	5 ft 11 in (1.80 m)		Ateneo
G	18	(Philippines)	Rene Canent	5 ft 8 in (1.73 m)		José Rizal
C	23	(Philippines)	Rolando Evangelista	6 ft 3 in (1.91 m)		San Beda
F/C	24	(Philippines)	Nathaniel Castillo	6 ft 2 in (1.88 m)		Letran
G	25	(Philippines)	Rolando Pineda	5 ft 9 in (1.75 m)		UE
F	35	(United States)	Kevin Cluess (I)	6 ft 4 in (1.93 m)		St.John's University
G	40	(Philippines)	Miguel Bilbao	5 ft 8 in (1.73 m)		De La Salle
F/C	41	(United States)	Odell Ball (I)	6 ft 8 in (2.03 m)		Marquette

Head coach

- (Philippines) Valentin Eduque

Assistant coach(es)

Legend

- (C) Team captain
- (I) Import
- Injured
