= 1986 Tanduay Rhum Makers season =

- Head coach: Arturo Valenzona
- Owners: Elizalde and Company

Reinforced Conference results
- Record: 16–8 (66.7%)
- Place: 1st
- Playoff finish: Champion

All Filipino Conference results
- Record: 12–4 (75%)
- Place: 1st
- Playoff finish: Champion

Open Conference results
- Record: 9–15 (37.5%)
- Place: 4th
- Playoff finish: Semifinals

Tanduay Rhum Makers seasons

The 1986 Tanduay Rhum Makers season was the 12th season of the franchise in the Philippine Basketball Association (PBA).

== Transactions ==
Players Added	Signed	Former team
Anthony Dasalla	Off-season	Gold Eagle Beer (1984)
Marlowe Jacutin	Off-season	Country Fair Hotdogs (1984)
Alex Clariño	July 1986	Ginebra San Miguel
Zaldy Latoza ^{Re-acquired}	July 1986	Tanduay Rhum (1984)

== First PBA title ==
The Tanduay Rhum Makers were a team on a mission right at the start of the 1986 PBA season, playing their first full conference with Ramon Fernandez. The Rhum Makers were reinforced by the pair of Rob Williams, a first-round pick by the Denver Nuggets in the 1982 NBA draft, and Andre McKoy, a 2nd-team NCAA Division III All-American and member of the 1984 NCAA Division III national champions.

Tanduay started out with four straight victories before a skid of four straight losses, the Rhum Makers would win seven games in a row, the last two in the eliminations and their first five matches in the semifinals. After being thwarted by Great Taste in their first attempt to reach the finals for the first time since 1978, the Rhum Makers would formalize its entry to the championship round against Great Taste following a 141-123 win over Shell on May 29.

The ballclub of the late Don Manolo Elizalde won their first-ever PBA title after 11 long years with a 4-2 series victory over Great Taste Coffee Makers.

== 2nd championship (rivalry with Ginebra) ==
Tanduay has carried on the momentum of their Reinforced Conference triumph by winning their first five assignments in the All-Filipino before losing their last game in the eliminations to Manila Beer. On August 21, the Rhum Makers advanced into the finals for the second straight conference and arranged a title showdown with Ginebra San Miguel as they frustrated Great Taste anew, 115-107, dethroning the defending, two-time All-Filipino champions.

Tanduay went on to win their second straight championship by defeating crowd-favorite Ginebra San Miguel, three games to one, in the best-of-five title series as they became only the fourth team to win the prestigious All-Filipino crown.

== The foiled grandslam bid ==
The Rhum Makers' bid for a grandslam started on a wrong foot, losing their first four games in the Open Conference. Rob Williams' Houston Cougar teammate and Phi Slama Jama member Benny "The Outlaw" Anders and Williams' old partner Andre McKoy played two games each. Andy Thompson, a brother of the Los Angeles Lakers' Mychal Thompson in the NBA, led Tanduay to their first victory as the Rhum Makers escaped with a 124-123 win over Magnolia Cheese. Three nights later on October 12 in a highly anticipated first meeting between the two protagonists of the All-Filipino Finals and the much awaited import match-up between Rob Williams and Ginebra's Billy Ray Bates, Tanduay beat Ginebra San Miguel, 114-109, for their second win and gave the Gins their first defeat in the conference after four straight victories.

The Rhum Makers makes it to the four-team semifinal round when from 0-4, the team had a five-game winning streak and won 8 of their next 10 games. Tanduay was simply outplayed by the two teams that will play for the Open championship - Ginebra and Manila Beer, during the second round of the semis. The Rhum Makers lost to Manila Beer on Beermen import Michael Young's three-point shot with one second left and two days after, Tanduay fell behind by a large margin of 44 points at halftime against arch rival Ginebra as their grandslam hopes ended.

== Awards ==
- Ramon Fernandez won his third Most Valuable Player award, joining William "Bogs" Adornado as a three-time PBA MVP winner.
- Rob Williams won the Reinforced Conference Best Import award.
- Jose "JB" Yango was voted by the Sports Columnist Organization of the Philippines (SCOOP) as the Most Outstanding player of the finals series in the team's two championships.
- Ramon Fernandez and Freddie Hubalde were named in the Mythical team first five selection.

== Won-loss records vs Opponents ==
Team	Win	Loss	1st (Reinforced)	2nd (All-Filipino)	3rd (Open)
Alaska	5	3	2-2	1-0	2-1
Ginebra	8	7	2-2	5-2	1-3
Great Taste	12	9	6-4	3-0	3-5
Magnolia	2	0	N/A	N/A	2-0
Manila Beer	2	5	2-0	0-1	0-4
Shell	7	3	4-0	2-1	1-2
RP-Magnolia	1	0	N/A	1-0	N/A
Total	37	27	16-8	12-4	9-15

== Roster ==
Tanduay Rhum Makers roster
Players
Coaches

Pos.	No.	Nat.	Name	Ht.	Wt.
F	5	(Philippines)	Alex Clariño	6 ft 2 in (1.88 m)		Lyceum
G	7	(Philippines)	Antonio Torrente	6 ft 1 in (1.85 m)
G/F	8	(Philippines)	Anthony Dasalla	6 ft 2 in (1.88 m)		Far Eastern
G	9	(Philippines)	Ramon Dela Cruz	5 ft 11 in (1.80 m)		Philippine Christian
G	10	(Philippines)	Freddie Hubalde	6 ft 1 in (1.85 m)		Mapúa
F	12	(Philippines)	Victor Sanchez	6 ft 3 in (1.91 m)		Mapúa
F	13	(Philippines)	Abet Gutierrez	6 ft 2 in (1.88 m)		Ateneo de Davao
F/C	15	(Philippines)	Ely Capacio	6 ft 4 in (1.93 m)
F	17	(Philippines)	Padim Israel	6 ft 2 in (1.88 m)		Ateneo
C	19	(Philippines)	Ramon Fernandez	6 ft 4 in (1.93 m)		San Carlos
F	23	(Philippines)	Zaldy Latoza	6 ft 2 in (1.88 m)		TUA
F	24	(Philippines)	Jose Yango	6 ft 3 in (1.91 m)		San Beda
G/F	32	(Philippines)	Marlowe Jacutin	6 ft 1 in (1.85 m)		Visayas
G	42	(Philippines)	Willie Generalao	5 ft 9 in (1.75 m)		Visayas

Head coach

- (Philippines) Arturo Valenzona

Assistant coach(es)

- (Philippines) Derrick Pumaren

Legend

- (C) Team captain
- Injured

=== Imports ===
Tournament	Name	#	Height	From
1986 PBA Reinforced Conference	Rob Williams	21	6 ft 2 in (1.88 m)	University of Houston
1986 PBA Reinforced Conference	Andre Mckoy	33	6 ft 2 in (1.88 m)	Wisconsin-Whitewater
1986 PBA Open Conference	Rob Williams	21	6 ft 2 in (1.88 m)	University of Houston
1986 PBA Open Conference	Benny Anders	0	6 ft 5 in (1.96 m)	University of Houston
1986 PBA Open Conference	Andre Mckoy	33	6 ft 2 in (1.88 m)	Wisconsin-Whitewater
1986 PBA Open Conference	Andy Thompson	22	6 ft 5 in (1.96 m)	University of Minnesota
