= 1986 PBA Reinforced Conference =

Philippine basketball tournament

- Duration: April 6 – June 17, 1986
- TV partner(s): Vintage Sports (PTV)

Finals
- Champions: Tanduay Rhum Makers
- Runners-up: Great Taste Coffee Makers

Awards
- Best Import: Rob Williams (Tanduay Rhum Makers)

PBA Reinforced Conference chronology
- < 1985 1987 >

PBA conference chronology
- < 1985 Reinforced 1986 All-Filipino >

The 1986 Philippine Basketball Association (PBA) Reinforced Conference was the first conference of the 1986 PBA season. It started on April 6 and ended on June 17, 1986. The tournament requires two import each per team with both standing 6"3 and below.

== Format ==
The following format will be observed for the duration of the conference:

- Double-round robin eliminations; 10 games per team; Teams are then seeded by basis on win–loss records.
- Team with the worst record after the elimination round will be eliminated.
- Semifinals will be two round robin affairs with the five remaining teams. Results from the elimination round will be carried over.
- The top two teams in the semifinals advance to the best-of-seven finals. The last two teams dispute the third-place trophy in a best-of-seven playoff.

== Imports ==
Each team were allowed two imports. The first line in the table are the original reinforcements of the teams. Below the name are the replacement of the import above. Same with the third replacement that is also highlighted with a different color. GP is the number of games played.

Team	Name	GP	Name	GP
Alaska Milkmen	Donnie Ray Koonce	23	Jerry Eaves	22
Ginebra San Miguel	Jojo Hunter	1	Terry Duerod	24
Ginebra San Miguel	Clinton Wheeler	5		
Ginebra San Miguel	Keith Gray	18		
Great Taste Coffee Makers	Mike Wilson	5	Jeff Collins	23
Great Taste Coffee Makers	Greg Jones	3		
Great Taste Coffee Makers	Michael Holton	15		
Manila Beer Brewmasters	George Turner	3	Carlton Cooper	10
Manila Beer Brewmasters	Butch Hays	6		
Shell Oilers	Dwight Anderson	16	Stewart Granger	18
Tanduay Rhum Makers	Andre McKoy	23	Rob Williams	24

== Elimination round ==
Pos	Team	W	L	PCT	GB	Qualification
1	Great Taste Coffee Makers	8	2	.800	—	Semifinal round
2	Alaska Milkmen	6	4	.600	2	Semifinal round
3	Tanduay Rhum Makers	6	4	.600	2	Semifinal round
4	Ginebra San Miguel	5	5	.500	3	Semifinal round
5	Pilipinas Shell Oilers	3	7	.300	5	Semifinal round
6	Manila Beer Brewmasters	2	8	.200	6	

== Semifinal round ==
Pos	Team	W	L	PCT	GB	Qualification
1	Great Taste Coffee Makers	12	6	.667 (Note: Head-to-head record: Great Taste 2–2 Tanduay, Great Taste +3)	—	Advance to the Finals
2	Tanduay Rhum Makers	12	6	.667	—	Advance to the Finals
3	Ginebra San Miguel	11	7	.611	1	Proceed to third place playoffs
4	Alaska Milkmen	9	9	.500	3	Proceed to third place playoffs
5	Pilipinas Shell Oilers	4	14	.222	8	

== Third place playoffs ==
Vintage

June 5

Ginebra San Miguel 138, Alaska Milkmen 135
Scoring by quarter: 28–35, 40-38, 41-30, 29–32
Pts: Terry Duerod 30	Pts: Jerry Eaves 39

The ULTRA, Pasig

Vintage

June 8

Ginebra San Miguel 147, Alaska Milkmen 134
Scoring by quarter: 34-30, 39-30, 33–35, 41-39
Pts: Terry Duerod 50	Pts: Eaves 30 Tuadles 30

The ULTRA, Pasig

Vintage

June 10

Ginebra San Miguel 127, Alaska Milkmen 130
Scoring by quarter: 36-36, 31-29, 25–34, 35-31
Pts: Terry Duerod 40	Pts: Jerry Eaves 58

The ULTRA, Pasig

Vintage

June 12

Ginebra San Miguel 121, Alaska Milkmen 124
Scoring by quarter: 30-24, 35-29, 26–42, 30-29
Pts: Terry Duerod 41	Pts: Jerry Eaves 54

The ULTRA, Pasig

Vintage

June 15

Ginebra San Miguel 148, Alaska Milkmen 123
Scoring by quarter: 36-22, 34–37, 38-28, 40-36
Pts: Keith Gray 42	Pts: Jerry Eaves 29

The ULTRA, Pasig

Vintage

June 17

Ginebra San Miguel 139, Alaska Milkmen 137 (OT)
Scoring by quarter: 29–30, 36-22, 31–36, 28–36, Overtime: 15-13
Pts: Terry Duerod 47	Pts: Jerry Eaves 62
Ginebra wins series, 4–2

The ULTRA, Pasig

== Finals ==
Vintage

June 5

Great Taste Coffee Makers 114, Tanduay Rhum Makers 117

The ULTRA, Pasig

Vintage

June 8

Great Taste Coffee Makers 126, Tanduay Rhum Makers 121 (OT)

The ULTRA, Pasig

Vintage

June 10

Great Taste Coffee Makers 110, Tanduay Rhum Makers 117

The ULTRA, Pasig

Vintage

June 12

Great Taste Coffee Makers 111, Tanduay Rhum Makers 112

The ULTRA, Pasig

Vintage

June 15

Great Taste Coffee Makers 111, Tanduay Rhum Makers 106

The ULTRA, Pasig

Vintage

June 17

Great Taste Coffee Makers 109, Tanduay Rhum Makers 132
Tanduay wins series, 4–2

The ULTRA, Pasig
