= 1986 PBA Open Conference =

- Duration: September 23 – December 11, 1986
- TV partner(s): Vintage Sports (PTV)

Finals
- Champions: Ginebra San Miguel
- Runners-up: Manila Beer Brewmasters

Awards
- Best Import: Michael Young (Manila Beer Brewmasters)

PBA Open Conference chronology
- < 1985 1987 >

PBA conference chronology
- < 1986 All-Filipino 1987 Open >

The 1986 Philippine Basketball Association (PBA) Open Conference was the third and final conference of the 1986 PBA season. It started on September 23 and ended on December 11, 1986. The tournament requires two import each per team with the height limit of 6"3 and 6"6.

== Format ==
The following format will be observed for the duration of the conference:

- Double-round robin eliminations; 12 games per team; Teams are then seeded by basis on win–loss records.
- Team with the worst record after the elimination round will be eliminated. The top two teams will advance outright to the semifinals.
- The next four teams will qualify to the single round robin quarterfinals. Results from the eliminations will be carried over. The top two teams will advance to the semifinals.
- Semifinals will be a double round robin affair with the remaining teams.
- The top two teams in the semifinals advance to the best-of-seven finals. The last two teams dispute the third-place trophy in a best-of-seven series.

== List of imports ==
Each team were allowed two imports. The first line in the table are the original reinforcements of the teams. Below the name are the replacement of the import above. Same with the third replacement that is also highlighted with a different color. GP is the number of games played.

Team	Name	GP	Name	GP
Alaska Milkmen	Donnie Ray Koonce	5	Norman Black	14
Alaska Milkmen	Keith Morrison	10		
Ginebra San Miguel	Billy Ray Bates	22	Michael Hackett	22
Great Taste Coffee Makers	Eric Turner	6	Johnny Brown	6
Great Taste Coffee Makers	Alvin Franklin	17	Lewis Jackson	18
Magnolia Cheese	Don Collins	3	Rufus Harris	12
Magnolia Cheese	Bernard Title	3		
Magnolia Cheese	James Banks	6		
Manila Beer Brewmasters	Harold Keeling	22	Michael Young	22
Formula Shell Spark Aiders	Fred Reynolds	11	Dexter Shouse	15
Formula Shell Spark Aiders	Perry Young	4		
Tanduay Rhum Makers	Benny Anders	2	Rob Williams	24
Tanduay Rhum Makers	Andre McKoy	2		
Tanduay Rhum Makers	Andy Thompson	20		

== Elimination round ==
Pos	Team	W	L	PCT	GB	Qualification
1	Ginebra San Miguel	9	3	.750	—	Advance to semifinal round
2	Manila Beer Brewmasters	9	3	.750	—	Advance to semifinal round
3	Tanduay Rhum Makers	6	6	.500	3	Proceed to quarterfinal round
4	Great Taste Coffee Makers	6	6	.500	3	Proceed to quarterfinal round
5	Formula Shell Spark Aiders	6	6	.500	3	Proceed to quarterfinal round
6	Alaska Milkmen	4	8	.333	5	Proceed to quarterfinal round
7	Magnolia Cheese Makers	2	10	.167	7	

== Quarterfinal round ==
Pos	Team	W	L	PCT	GB	Qualification
3	Tanduay Rhum Makers	8	7	.533	—	Semifinal round
4	Great Taste Coffee Makers	8	7	.533	—	Semifinal round
5	Formula Shell Spark Aiders	7	8	.467	1	
6	Alaska Milkmen	5	10	.333	3	

== Semifinal round ==
Pos	Team	W	L	PCT	GB	Qualification
1	Ginebra San Miguel	4	1	.800 (Note: Head-to-head record: Ginebra 3–0 Manila Beer)	—	Advance to the Finals
2	Manila Beer Brewmasters	4	1	.800	—	Advance to the Finals
3	Tanduay Rhum Makers	1	4	.200 (Note: Head-to-head record: Tanduay 3–1 Great Taste)	3	Proceed to third place playoffs
4	Great Taste Coffee Makers	1	4	.200	3	Proceed to third place playoffs

=== Results ===
Teams	GIN	GTC	MB	TAN
Ginebra San Miguel	—	130–125	115–114	137–110
Great Taste Coffee Makers	142–128	—	114–115	107–116
Manila Beer Brewmasters		122–121	—	114–111
Tanduay Rhum Makers	130–151		108–111	—

Legend: Blue = left column team win; Red = top row team win.
Matches with lighter background shading were decided after overtime.

== Third place playoffs ==
Vintage

December 2

Tanduay Rhum Makers 130, Great Taste Coffee Makers 146

The ULTRA, Pasig

Vintage

December 4

Tanduay Rhum Makers 128, Great Taste Coffee Makers 141

The ULTRA, Pasig

Vintage

December 7

Tanduay Rhum Makers 128, Great Taste Coffee Makers 138

The ULTRA, Pasig

Vintage

December 9

Tanduay Rhum Makers 143, Great Taste Coffee Makers 170
Great Taste wins series, 4–0

The ULTRA, Pasig

== Finals ==
Vintage

December 2

Ginebra San Miguel 135, Manila Beer Brewmasters 133

The ULTRA, Pasig

Vintage

December 4

Ginebra San Miguel 111, Manila Beer Brewmasters 121

The ULTRA, Pasig

Vintage

December 7

Ginebra San Miguel 139, Manila Beer Brewmasters 130

The ULTRA, Pasig

Vintage

December 9

Ginebra San Miguel 145, Manila Beer Brewmasters 135 (2OT)

The ULTRA, Pasig

Vintage

December 11

Ginebra San Miguel 130, Manila Beer Brewmasters 120
Ginebra wins series, 4–1

The ULTRA, Pasig
