= 1986 Formula Shell Spark Aiders season =

- Head coach: Freddie Webb; Edgardo Ocampo
- Owner: Pilipinas Shell Inc.

Reinforced Conference results
- Record: 4–14 (22.2%)
- Place: 5th
- Playoff finish: Semifinals

All Filipino Conference results
- Record: 9–10 (47.4%)
- Place: 3rd
- Playoff finish: Semifinals

Open Conference results
- Record: 7–8 (46.7%)
- Place: 5th
- Playoff finish: Quarterfinals

Formula Shell Spark Aiders seasons

The 1986 Formula Shell Spark Aiders season was the 2nd season of the franchise in the Philippine Basketball Association (PBA). They were known as the Pilipinas Shell Oilers in the Reinforced Conference and Shell Helix Oilers in the All-Filipino Conference.

== Transactions ==
Players added	Signed	Former team
Biboy Ravanes	Off-season	Magnolia

== Occurrences ==
After dropping their first two outings in the semifinals against Great Taste by one point in overtime and Ginebra, 106–113 on May 15, coach Freddie Webb decided to resign from his position. He was replaced by former Manila Beer coach Edgardo Ocampo.

Perry Young, a Portland third round draft selection in 1985, was a late replacement for the injured Fred Reynolds, and played for the Shell's last four games in the Third Conference.

== Records ==
On November 16, which was the last playing date in the quarterfinal round of the Open Conference, Formula Shell recorded the second largest winning margin of 54 points in a 154–100 victory over already qualified Tanduay Rhum Makers, which got another all-time record of 13 triples from import Rob Williams. The win broke the six-game losing streak of the Spark Aiders.

The match was delayed for almost one and a half hours after import Dexter Shouse's powerful dunk late in the second quarter cause the ULTRA north goal to mis-aligned. The Spark Aiders were eliminated from the semifinal round when Great Taste prevailed over Alaska Milk later in the night.

== Win-loss records vs opponents ==
Team	Win	Loss	1st (Reinforced)	2nd (All-Filipino)	3rd (Open)
Alaska	2	7	1-3	1-1	0-3
Ginebra	3	7	1-3	1-3	1-1
Great Taste	5	9	0-4	3-4	2-1
Magnolia	1	1	N/A	N/A	1-1
Manila Beer	5	1	2-0	2-0	1-1
Tanduay	3	7	0-4	1-2	2-1
RP-Magnolia	1	0	N/A	1-0	N/A
Total	20	32	4-14	9-10	7-8

== Roster ==
1986 Formula Shell Spark Aiders roster
Players

Pos.	#	POB	Name	Height	Weight	DOB (YYYY–MM–DD)	From
C	5	(Philippines)	Sonny Cabatu	6 ft 5 in (1.96 m)			PSBA
G	6	(Philippines)	Biboy Ravanes	6 ft 0 in (1.83 m)			Cebu
G	8	(Philippines)	Arturo Cristobal	6 ft 1 in (1.85 m)			Far Eastern
G	10	(Philippines)	Romeo Ang	6 ft 1 in (1.85 m)			Letran
C	11	(Philippines)	Menardo Jubinal	6 ft 5 in (1.96 m)			Mapúa
F	12	(Philippines)	Reynaldo Lazaro	6 ft 2 in (1.88 m)			Far Eastern
G	13	(Philippines)	Leo Austria	5 ft 10 in (1.78 m)			Lyceum
F	18	(Philippines)	Philip Cezar	6 ft 3 in (1.91 m)			José Rizal
F	26	(Philippines)	Aldo Perez	6 ft 3 in (1.91 m)			De La Salle
G/F	33	(Philippines)	Bogs Adornado	6 ft 1 in (1.85 m)			UST
G	51 & 15	(Philippines)	Bernie Fabiosa	5 ft 9 in (1.75 m)			UE
F	71	(Philippines)	Manuel Marquez	6 ft 2 in (1.88 m)			San Beda

Coaches

Head coach

- (Philippines) Edgardo Ocampo

Assistant coach(es)

- (Philippines) Frederick "Freddie" Gonzales

Legend

- (C) Team captain
- Injured

=== Imports ===
Tournament	Name	#	Height	From
1986 PBA Reinforced Conference	Dwight Anderson	0	6 ft 3 in (1.91 m)	University of Southern California
1986 PBA Reinforced Conference	Stewart Granger	1	6 ft 3 in (1.91 m)	Villanova University
1986 PBA Open Conference	Dexter Shouse	14	6 ft 2 in (1.88 m)	University of South Alabama
1986 PBA Open Conference	Fred Reynolds	32	6 ft 6 in (1.98 m)	University of Texas at El Paso
1986 PBA Open Conference	Perry Young	8	6 ft 5 in (1.96 m)	Virginia Tech
