= 1986 Great Taste Coffee Makers season =

- Head coach: Baby Dalupan
- Owner: CFC Corporation

Reinforced Conference results
- Record: 14–10 (58.3%)
- Place: 2nd
- Playoff finish: Finals

All Filipino Conference results
- Record: 9–7 (56.3%)
- Place: 4th
- Playoff finish: Semifinals

Open Conference results
- Record: 13–11 (54.2%)
- Place: 3rd
- Playoff finish: Semifinals

Great Taste Coffee Makers seasons

The 1986 Great Taste Coffee Makers season was the 12th season of the franchise in the Philippine Basketball Association (PBA).

== Transactions ==
Players added	Signed	Former team
Fritz Gaston	Off-season	Manila Beer
Gerry Samlani	Off-season	Magnolia
Rafael Sison ^{former player, re-signed}	Off-season	Presto (1982)
Aaron Torres ^{Rookie}	Off-season	N/A
Leopoldo Herrera	July 1986	Manila Beer
Federico Lauchengco	July 1986	Magnolia
Renato Kabigting ^{Comebacking player signed}	August 1986	San Miguel Beer (1982)

=== Trade ===
Off-season	To Ginebra Chito Loyzaga	To Great Taste Steve Watson

== Finals stint ==
After failing to win the Grandslam in the prior year, the Great Taste Coffee Makers returned to the finals against the Tanduay Rhum Makers in the first conference of the season. Great Taste had the returning Jeff Collins, a former best import awardee who led the CFC ballclub to a title back in 1984, and Michael David Holton (the third import to arrived as Collins' partner after Mike Wilson and Gregory Jones) as their imports going up against the Tanduay pair of Rob Williams and Andre McKoy. The Coffee Makers were the odds-on favorite to win the title due to their championship experience, but the Rhum Makers were determined to end a long-drought and gave their franchise its first PBA title. Great Taste lost to Tanduay in six games in the Best-of-seven title series.

== Occurrences ==
Great Taste's first choice for an import in the Open Conference, Anthony Frederick, arrived and was measured slightly over six-foot-six, the limit for one of the two imports. Sources said at least two teams refused to grant the exception, leaving the Coffee Makers with no choice but to send him back home. Frederick only saw action as a guest import for amateur club RFM-Swifts that beat Alaska Milk in the PBA-PABL exhibition series at the Rizal Coliseum a week before the start of the Third Conference.

The Coffee Makers paraded two new imports, Lewis Jackson and Alvin Franklin, at the start of the second round of eliminations in the Open Conference, replacing Johnny Brown and Eric Turner.

== Won-loss records vs opponents ==
Team	Win	Loss	1st (Reinforced)	2nd (All-Filipino)	3rd (Open)
Alaska	7	1	3-1	1-0	3-0
Ginebra	6	5	2-2	2-1	2-2
Magnolia	2	0	N/A	N/A	2-0
Manila Beer	2	5	1-1	1-0	0-4
Shell	9	5	4-0	4-3	1-2
Tanduay	9	12	4-6	0-3	5-3
RP-Magnolia	1	0	N/A	1-0	N/A
Total	36	28	14-10	9-7	13-11

== Roster ==
Great Taste Coffee roster
Players
Coaches

Pos.	No.	Nat.	Name	Ht.	Wt.
C	1	(Philippines)	Manny Victorino	6 ft 5 in (1.96 m)		José Rizal
G/F	5	(Philippines)	Steve Watson	6 ft 2 in (1.88 m)		Ateneo
F	6	(Philippines)	Abe King	6 ft 3 in (1.91 m)		San Beda
C	7	(Philippines)	Joel Banal	6 ft 5 in (1.96 m)		Mapúa
G	7	(Philippines)	Federico Lauchengco	6 ft 0 in (1.83 m)		Far Eastern
C	10	(Philippines)	Carlson Samlani	6 ft 5 in (1.96 m)		San Sebastian
G	11	(Philippines)	Jaime Manansala	5 ft 11 in (1.80 m)		UE
G	12	(Philippines)	Rafael Sison	6 ft 1 in (1.85 m)		Ateneo de Davao
F	14	(Philippines)	Leopoldo Herrera	6 ft 3 in (1.91 m)		Wesleyan Philippines
G	15	(Philippines)	Aaron Torres	5 ft 10 in (1.78 m)		UE
G	22	(Philippines)	Matthew Gaston	6 ft 1 in (1.85 m)		Ateneo
G	23	(United States)	Ricardo Brown	5 ft 11 in (1.80 m)		Pepperdine
F	29	(Philippines)	Bernardo Carpio	6 ft 3 in (1.91 m)		Ateneo
F	33	(United States)	Willie Pearson	6 ft 1 in (1.85 m)		Chaminade
G	9 & 34	(Philippines)	Renato Kabigting	6 ft 1 in (1.85 m)		Ateneo

Head coach

- (Philippines) Baby Dalupan

Assistant coach(es)

- (Philippines) Jimmy Mariano

Legend

- (C) Team captain
- Injured

=== Imports ===
Tournament	Name	#	Height	From
1986 PBA Reinforced Conference	Jeff Collins	24	6 ft 3 in (1.91 m)	UNLV
1986 PBA Reinforced Conference	Mike Wilson	2	6 ft 3 in (1.91 m)	Marquette University
1986 PBA Reinforced Conference	Greg Jones		6 ft 2 in (1.88 m)	West Virginia University
1986 PBA Reinforced Conference	Michael Holton	14	6 ft 3 in (1.91 m)	University of California
1986 PBA Open Conference	Johnny Brown	3	6 ft 6 in (1.98 m)	University of New Mexico
1986 PBA Open Conference	Eric Turner	12	6 ft 3 in (1.91 m)	University of Michigan
1986 PBA Open Conference	Alvin Franklin	20	6 ft 3 in (1.91 m)	University of Houston
1986 PBA Open Conference	Lewis Jackson	24	6 ft 6 in (1.98 m)	Alabama State University
