= 1986 Ginebra San Miguel season =

- Head coach: Robert Jaworski
- Owners: La Tondeña Distillers, Inc.

Reinforced Conference results
- Record: 15–9 (62.5%)
- Place: 3rd
- Playoff finish: Semifinals

All Filipino Conference results
- Record: 10–9 (52.6%)
- Place: 2nd
- Playoff finish: Runner-up

Open Conference results
- Record: 17–5 (77.3%)
- Place: 1st
- Playoff finish: Champions

Ginebra San Miguel seasons

The 1986 Ginebra San Miguel season was the 8th season of the franchise in the Philippine Basketball Association (PBA).

== Transactions ==
Players added	Signed	Former team
Joey Loyzaga	Off-season	Magnolia
Dante Gonzalgo	Off-season	Magnolia
Dondon Ampalayo ^{Rookie}	Off-season	N/A
Leo Isaac ^{Rookie free agent}	July 1986	N/A
Mukesh Advani ^{Rookie free agent}	July 1986	N/A

=== Trade ===
Off-season	To Great Taste Steve Watson	To Ginebra Chito Loyzaga

== 1st finals stint under Big J (rivalry with Tanduay) ==
On August 21, Ginebra clinched one of the two finals berth in the All-Filipino Conference with a 91-83 win over Shell Helix. This marks the fourth time the La Toñdena ballclub is playing in the championship series and the first since Robert Jaworski became player-coach of the team in 1985. Ginebra San Miguel were going up against Tanduay Rhum Makers in the finals, who were seeking their second straight title.

A bitter rivalry since the Crispa-Toyota days was born during the All-Filipino championship. Former Toyota teammates Ramon Fernandez and Robert Jaworski played on opposite sides in the finals for the first time. Adding color to their rivalry was Tanduay coach Arturo Valenzona, who steered Ginebra (then Gilbey's Gin) to three trips in the finals from 1982 to 1984 - the same coach Jaworski replaced on the Ginebra bench.

After taking the series opener of the best-of-five title series, Ginebra lost three straight to the Rhum Makers, which clinch their second championship of the season with a hairline 93-92 win in Game Four.

== The super import duo ==
For the Open Conference, Ginebra recruited Billy Ray Bates, known as “The Black Superman”, who had played for the Crispa Redmanizers during their 1983 Grand Slam season. He joined returning import Michael Hackett, the previous season’s Best Import.

In their highly anticipated first game for Ginebra on September 25 as Bates and Hackett went up against Alaska's Norman Black and Donnie Ray Koonce - similarly comebacking imports - Ginebra won, 122-115. Bates scored 46 points while Hackett had 38.

== Championship ==
After eight years since joining the league in 1979, the La Tondeña ballclub won their first PBA championship by winning the Open Conference crown over Manila Beer, four games to one. On the night of December 11, 1986, Ginebra San Miguel clinched the trophy with a 130-120 victory in Game Five. The Living Legend Robert Jaworski became the first playing coach to steer a team to a PBA title.

== Occurrences ==
League pioneer Francis Arnaiz retired from active playing after seeing action only in the first round of eliminations of the Open Conference.

== Awards ==
- Dondon Ampalayo was named the season's Rookie of the Year.
- Robert Jaworski made it to the Mythical team's first five selection.

== Won–loss records vs opponents ==
Team	Win	Loss	1st (Reinforced)	2nd (All-Filipino)	3rd (Open)
Alaska	10	4	6-4	2-0	2-0
Great Taste	5	6	2-2	1-2	2-2
Magnolia	2	0	N/A	N/A	2-0
Manila Beer	11	1	2-0	2-0	7-1
Shell	7	3	3-1	3-1	1-1
Tanduay	7	8	2-2	2-5	3-1
RP-Magnolia	0	1	N/A	0-1	N/A
Total	42	23	15-9	10-9	17-5

== Roster ==
1986 Ginebra San Miguel roster
Players

Pos.	#	POB	Name	Height	Weight	DOB (YYYY–MM–DD)	From
G/F	3	(Philippines)	Joey Marquez	6 ft 1 in (1.85 m)			Angeles
G	5	(Philippines)	Mukesh Advani	5 ft 11 in (1.80 m)			San Beda
F	6	(Philippines)	Dondon Ampalayo	6 ft 3 in (1.91 m)			USJ–R
G	7	(Philippines)	Robert Jaworski	6 ft 1 in (1.85 m)			UE
G	8	(Philippines)	Francis Arnaiz	5 ft 11 in (1.80 m)			Ateneo
G	9	(Philippines)	Leo Isaac	6 ft 1 in (1.85 m)			Mapúa
C	10	(Philippines)	Eduardo Ducut	6 ft 5 in (1.96 m)			Letran
C	11	(Philippines)	Romulo Mamaril	6 ft 6 in (1.98 m)			Mapúa
G/F	12	(Philippines)	Dante Gonzalgo	6 ft 2 in (1.88 m)			Lyceum
F	13	(Philippines)	Terry Saldaña	6 ft 3 in (1.91 m)			Letran
G	14	(Philippines)	Joey Loyzaga	6 ft 0 in (1.83 m)			San Beda
F	20	(Philippines)	Rolando Buhay	6 ft 3 in (1.91 m)			NCBA
F	41	(Philippines)	Chito Loyzaga	6 ft 3 in (1.91 m)			San Beda
G	77	(Philippines)	Rey Perez	6 ft 1 in (1.85 m)			Mapúa

Coaches

Head coach

- (Philippines) Robert Jaworski

Assistant coach(es)

- (Philippines) Rino Salazar

Team manager

- (Philippines) Adolf Ferrer

Legend

- (C) Team captain
- Injured

=== Imports ===
Tournament	Name	#	Height	From
1986 PBA Reinforced Conference	Terry Duerod	1	6 ft 2 in (1.88 m)	University of Detroit Mercy
1986 PBA Reinforced Conference	Anthony Hunter		6 ft 2 in (1.88 m)	University of Colorado
1986 PBA Reinforced Conference	Clinton Wheeler	0	6 ft 1 in (1.85 m)	William Paterson University
1986 PBA Reinforced Conference	Keith Gray	32	6 ft 3 in (1.91 m)	University of Detroit Mercy
1986 PBA Open Conference	Michael Hackett	00	6 ft 5 in (1.96 m)	Jacksonville University
1986 PBA Open Conference	Billy Ray Bates	2	6 ft 3 in (1.91 m)	Kentucky State University
