= 1986 Alaska Milkmen season =

- Head coach: Tony Vasquez; Cesar Jota
- General manager: Joel Aquino
- Owner: Holland Milk Products, Inc.

Reinforced Conference results
- Record: 11–13 (45.8%)
- Place: 4th
- Playoff finish: Semifinals

All-Filipino Conference results
- Record: 4–6 (40%)
- Place: 5th
- Playoff finish: Quarterfinals

Open Conference results
- Record: 5–10 (33.3%)
- Place: 6th
- Playoff finish: Quarterfinals

Alaska Milkmen seasons

The 1986 Alaska Milkmen season was the 1st season of the franchise in the Philippine Basketball Association (PBA).

== New team ==
Alaska Milk was accepted as a new member of the Philippine Basketball Association (PBA) that entered its 12th season. The league maintains a six-team field, following the leave of absence by the Magnolia club, one of the three founding members of the PBA. Alaska acquired players Marte Saldaña, Rudy Distrito and Noli Banate from Magnolia. They signed Magnolia coach Norman Black to a one-year contract as part of their coaching staff and import for the Third Conference. The other players acquired by the latest club were Alejo Alolor, Frankie Lim and Teddy Alfarero from Great Taste. Arnie Tuadles and Ricky Relosa came from Ginebra and Dennis Abbatuan from Shell. The rookies were Rey Cuenco, the first overall draft pick, Naning Valenciano and Rey Ramos.

The club's first head coach was former Atenean Tony Vasquez. In their very first conference, the Milkmen's imports were former best import winner Donnie Ray Koonce, who last played in the PBA three years previously in 1983, and Jerry Lee Eaves.

== Occurrences ==
After leading Alaska to a fourth-place finish in the first conference, coach Tony Vasquez was replaced by assistant coach Cesar Jota. He was supposed to begin the All-Filipino Conference to handle De La Salle-Zobel in their UAAP debut season. Starting the second round of eliminations in the third conference, the Milkmen welcomed back Tony Vasquez from the bench, but his return was spoiled by Alaska's 111–114 loss to Manila Beer on October 19. Two more outings and the coaching job was resumed by former San Bedan, Cesar Jota following Vasquez's sudden passing.

Donnie Ray Koonce teamed up with Norman Black in the Open (3rd) Conference. Koonce was replaced by Keith Morrison after playing five games.

== Won-loss records vs opponents ==
Team	Win	Loss	1st (Reinforced)	2nd (All-Filipino)	3rd (Open)
Ginebra	4	10	4-6	0-2	0–2
Great Taste	1	7	1-3	0-1	0–3
Magnolia	1	1	N/A	N/A	1-1
Manila Beer	2	4	1-1	1-1	0–2
Shell	7	2	3-1	1-1	3–0
Tanduay	3	5	2-2	0-1	1–2
RP-Magnolia	2	0	N/A	2-0	N/A
Total	20	29	11-13	4-6	5-10

== Roster ==
1986 Alaska Milkmen roster
Players

Pos.	#	POB	Name	Height	Weight	DOB (YYYY–MM–DD)	From
F	2	(Philippines)	Alejo Alolor	6 ft 1 in (1.85 m)			Visayas
G	4	(Philippines)	Frankie Lim	5 ft 11 in (1.80 m)			San Beda
G	7	(Philippines)	Marte Saldaña	5 ft 11 in (1.80 m)			Far Eastern
C	8	(Philippines)	Noli Banate	6 ft 5 in (1.96 m)			Mindanao
F	9	(Philippines)	Ludovico Valenciano	6 ft 1 in (1.85 m)			USLS
F	10	(Philippines)	Woodrow Balani	6 ft 0 in (1.83 m)			Visayas
F	11	(Philippines)	Arnie Tuadles	6 ft 1 in (1.85 m)			Visayas
F/C	12	(Philippines)	Reynaldo Cuenco	6 ft 4 in (1.93 m)			De La Salle Araneta
F	13	(Philippines)	Reynaldo Ramos	6 ft 1 in (1.85 m)			TUA
C	14	(Philippines)	Teodicio Alfarero	6 ft 4 in (1.93 m)			De La Salle
F	15	(Philippines)	Ricky Relosa	6 ft 3 in (1.91 m)			Mapúa
F	23	(Philippines)	Dennis Abbatuan	6 ft 2 in (1.88 m)			José Rizal
G	44	(Philippines)	Rudy Distrito	5 ft 11 in (1.80 m)			UE

Coaches

Head coach

- (Philippines) Tony Vasquez
- (Philippines) Cesar Jota

Assistant coach(es)

- (Philippines) Norman Black

Legend

- (C) Team captain
- Injured

=== Imports ===
Tournament	Name	#	Height	From
1986 PBA Reinforced Conference	Donnie Ray Koonce	30	6 ft 3 in (1.91 m)	UNC Charlotte
1986 PBA Reinforced Conference	Jerry Eaves	31	6 ft 3 in (1.91 m)	University of Louisville
1986 PBA Open Conference	Norman Black	24	6 ft 5 in (1.96 m)	Saint Joseph's University
1986 PBA Open Conference	Donnie Ray Koonce	30	6 ft 3 in (1.91 m)	UNC Charlotte
1986 PBA Open Conference	Keith Morrison	25	6 ft 3 in (1.91 m)	Washington State
