= 1986 Magnolia Cheese Makers season =

- Head coach: Derrick Pumaren
- Owner(s): San Miguel Corporation

Reinforced Conference results
- Record: 0–0
- Place: N/A
- Playoff finish: N/A

All Filipino Conference results
- Record: 0–0
- Place: N/A
- Playoff finish: N/A

Open Conference results
- Record: 2–10 (16.7%)
- Place: 7th
- Playoff finish: N/A

Magnolia Cheese Makers seasons

The 1986 Magnolia Cheese Makers season was the 12th season of the franchise in the Philippine Basketball Association (PBA).

== League return ==
After a two-conference leave, the San Miguel Corporation decided to return in the PBA Third Conference. The team will be known as Magnolia Cheese Makers and coach by Derrick Pumaren, who was assistant coach of Magnolia last season. The ballclub acquired eight players from the fabled Northern Consolidated (NCC) quintet, they are Samboy Lim, Hector Calma, Yves Dignadice, Elmer Reyes, Franz Pumaren, Pido Jarencio, Alfie Almario and Tonichi Yturri, who were all members of the national team that won the Asian Basketball Confederation (ABC) championships in Kuala Lumpur earlier in the year. They were joined by Jeffrey Graves and Alvin Teng, who were two players elevated from their farm team Magnolia Ice Cream in the PABL as 10 rookies will debut in the league's final conference of the season. Magnolia signed up two veterans to complete the 12-man lineup, Manny Paner, the only player left from the Magnolia squad prior to the two-conference leave, and Allan Abelgas, formerly of Tanduay last season.

== Last place finish ==
The Cheese Makers won only two of the 12 games in the eliminations and finish last among the 7-team field. Magnolia lost their first three games with Samboy Lim and Elmer Reyes not yet suited up as they are still playing for the national team in the Asian Games in Seoul, South Korea. Magnolia scored their first victory against Alaska, 123–110 on October 7, with new import Bernard Title playing his first game, replacing Don Collins as Rufus Harris’ partner. Title played two more games before being replaced by James Banks. The Cheese Makers lost their next seven matches but bowed out with a 121–116 upset win over skidding Formula Shell in their last game on November 9.

== Roster ==
1986 Magnolia Cheese Makers roster
Players

Pos.	#	POB	Name	Height	Weight	DOB (YYYY–MM–DD)	From
F	4	(Philippines)	Elmer Reyes	6 ft 1 in (1.85 m)			San Beda
G	5	(Philippines)	Franz Pumaren	5 ft 9 in (1.75 m)			De La Salle
G	6	(Philippines)	Pido Jarencio	5 ft 10 in (1.78 m)			UST
G	7	(Philippines)	Alfie Almario	6 ft 0 in (1.83 m)			De La Salle
F	9	(Philippines)	Samboy Lim	6 ft 0 in (1.83 m)			Letran
C	11	(Philippines)	Tonichi Yturri	6 ft 5 in (1.96 m)			De La Salle
F	12	(Philippines)	Yves Dignadice	6 ft 4 in (1.93 m)			STI WNU
F	13	(Philippines)	Manny Paner	6 ft 2 in (1.88 m)			Visayas
F	14	(Philippines)	Alvin Teng	6 ft 4 in (1.93 m)			Arellano
F	17	(Philippines)	Jeffrey Graves	6 ft 3 in (1.91 m)			Angeles
G	18	(Philippines)	Hector Calma	5 ft 9 in (1.75 m)			Adamson
G	34	(Philippines)	Allan Abelgas	5 ft 10 in (1.78 m)			USJ–R

Coaches

Head coach

- (Philippines) Derrick Pumaren

Assistant coach(es)

- (Philippines) Pilo Pumaren

Legend

- (C) Team captain
- Injured

=== Imports ===
Tournament	Name	#	Height	From
1986 PBA Open Conference	Rufus Harris	20	6 ft 3 in (1.91 m)	University of Maine
1986 PBA Open Conference	Don Collins	21	6 ft 6 in (1.98 m)	Washington State University
1986 PBA Open Conference	Bernard Tittle	3	6 ft 5 in (1.96 m)	Morris Brown College
1986 PBA Open Conference	James Banks	1	6 ft 5 in (1.96 m)	University of Georgia
