= Dondon Ampalayo =

Filipino basketball player (born 1963)

Personal information
- Born: April 18, 1963 (age 63) Cebu City, Philippines
- Listed height: 6 ft 3 in (1.91 m)
- Listed weight: 190 lb (86 kg)

Career information
- College: USJ–R
- PBA draft: 1986: 1st round, 3rd overall pick
- Drafted by: Ginebra San Miguel
- Playing career: 1986–1995
- Position: Power forward
- Number: 6, 54

Career history
- 1986–1993: Ginebra San Miguel / Añejo Rum 65ers
- 1993–1995: Alaska Milkmen

Career highlights
- 5x PBA champion (1986 PBA Open Conference, 1988 All-Filipino, 1991 PBA First Conference, 1994 Governor's, 1995 Governor's); PBA Rookie of the Year (1986); 2x PBA All-Star (1991, 1992); 2x PBA Mythical Second Team (1986, 1988); PBL's 20 Greatest Players

Cresencio "Dondon" Ampalayo (born April 18, 1963) is a Filipino retired professional basketball player in the Philippine Basketball Association (PBA).

Dubbed as the 'Magician' or the 'Magic Man' in the PBA, Ampalayo won Rookie of the Year honors in 1986 while suiting up for Ginebra San Miguel. Known for his pivot moves underneath the basket, Dondon won three championships in eight seasons with Ginebra from 1986 to 1993. He then played two more seasons with Alaska before persistent knee problems finally took its toll on him and cut short his career.

== Early life and amateur career ==
Ampalayo started out as a volleyball player before switching to basketball. He then played for University of San Jose–Recolletos in college, where he became known as a stretch four. He won a championship alongside Jojo Lastimosa over the Letran Knights at the National Inter-Collegiate tournament championship. Moving to Manila, he won a championship for the ESQ Merchants in the PABL. He was recognized as among the PBL's 20 Greatest Players of All-time in 2003.

== Professional career ==
=== Ginebra San Miguel / Añejo Rum 65ers ===
Ampalayo was selected by Ginebra San Miguel with the third overall pick in the 1986 PBA Draft. Playing alongside Terry Saldaña, they led Ginebra to a finals appearance in the 1986 All-Filipino Conference and he won his first PBA title alongside imports Billy Ray Bates and Michael Hackett in the Open Conference that season. He became the first Ginebra player and the third Cebuano to win the Rookie of the Year award. He also made the Mythical Second Team that season.

During the 1988 All-Filipino Conference, Ampalayo scored his career-high of 35 points. In the semifinal round, Ampalayo had a triple-double of 30 points, 12 assists, and 11 rebounds in 44 minutes against the Purefoods Hotdogs. A win over the San Miguel Beermen sealed their slot in the finals. In the finals, facing Purefoods, Añejo went up 2–1 in the best-of-five series. Before Game 4, Ampalayo fell ill, requiring hospitalization and was on dextrose for six hours. Still, he came off the bench for 20 points and seven rebounds as Añejo won the championship. He did not celebrate with the team, but went straight back to the hospital, leading to rumors that he had died after the game. His appearance on Inday Badiday's talk show Eye to Eye days later dispelled those rumors. For the conference, he averaged a team-leading 21 points. He made the Mythical Second Team once again that season.

Ampalayo won one more championship with Ginebra in the 1991 First Conference. Ginebra then lost in the 1991 Third Conference finals to the Alaska Milkmen. He made back to back All-Star appearances from 1991 to 1992.

=== Alaska Milkmen ===
A mid-season trade in 1993 saw Ampalayo's transfer to the Alaska Milkmen in exchange for Bobby Jose, reuniting with Jojo Lastimosa. They won a championship together with the Milkmen in the 1994 Governors' Cup.

In 1995, the Milkmen made it to every conference's finals, and won the 1995 Governors' Cup. However, he rarely saw playing time that season, except during the Governors' Cup. Due to recurring knee problems, he decided to retire that year after a 10-year career.

== Personal life ==
After retiring, Ampalayo became a successful businessman, investing in several shoe repair shops in Cebu and a water purifier business. He then moved to Sacramento, USA with his wife Anne Pasco Ampalayo and sons Aldreen and Zachary, working as a nurse. He is now back in Cebu.

== PBA career statistics ==
Legend
GP	Games played	MPG	Minutes per game
FG%	Field-goal percentage	3P%	3-point field-goal percentage	FT%	Free-throw percentage
RPG	Rebounds per game	APG	Assists per game	SPG	Steals per game
BPG	Blocks per game	PPG	Points per game	**Bold**	Career high

Year	Team	GP	MPG	FG%	3P%	FT%	RPG	APG	SPG	BPG	PPG
1986	Ginebra	**62**	23.6	**.515**	.000	.790	6.1	1.3	.4	.4	8.7
1987	Ginebra	42	**35.5**	.501	.226	**.797**	**9.3**	**3.3**	.6	**.5**	**17.1**
1988	Añejo	57	31.6	.418	.263	.789	8.9	2.9	**.9**	.4	15.8
1989	Añejo	5	17.1	.485	**.400**	.600	3.2	1.6	.2	.2	7.8
1990	Añejo	6	6.4	.308	.250	.000	.5	.7	.0	.0	1.5
1991	Ginebra	58	25.7	.455	.287	.720	5.6	2.4	.5	.6	9.1
1992	Ginebra	40	26.6	.488	.323	.766	4.9	2.7	.7	.4	11.4
1993	Ginebra	35	26.0	.465	.324	.630	6.1	1.5	.2	.2	10.5
1993	Alaska	35	26.0	.465	.324	.630	6.1	1.5	.2	.2	10.5
1994	Alaska	30	11.9	.402	.333	.648	4.6	.5	.1	.9	2.8
1995	Alaska	40	10.9	.396	.095	.500	2.0	.8	.2	.1	2.7
Career		375	24.4	.461	.279	.757	5.7	2.1	.5	.3	10.0
