= 1986 Manila Beer Brewmasters season =

- Head coach: Joe Lipa; Tito Eduque
- Owner: Asia Brewery

Reinforced Conference results
- Record: 2–8 (20%)
- Place: 6th
- Playoff finish: Eliminated

All Filipino Conference results
- Record: 3–6 (33.3%)
- Place: 6th
- Playoff finish: Quarterfinals

Open Conference results
- Record: 14–8 (63.6%)
- Place: 2nd
- Playoff finish: Finals (lost to Ginebra)

Manila Beer Brewmasters seasons

The 1986 Manila Beer Brewmasters season was the 3rd and final season of the Asia Brewery franchise in the Philippine Basketball Association (PBA).

== Transactions ==
Players Added	Signed	Former team
Ricardo Cui ^{Rookie}	Off-season	N/A
Adonis Tierra ^{Rookie}	Off-season	N/A
Ranulfo Robles ^{Rookie free agent}	Off-season	N/A
Tito Varela	Off-season	Tanduay Rhum Makers
Lim Eng Beng	July 1986	Crispa (1984)
Jesus Migalbin	July 1986	Magnolia

== Occurrences ==
The Brewmasters were handled by multi-titled amateur coach Joe Lipa at the start of the season, taking over from Olympian Edgardo Ocampo. After failing to lead Manila Beer past eliminations in the first conference, Lipa was replaced by another former Olympian Tito Eduque as Manila Beer head coach beginning the All-Filipino Conference. Coach Eduque bring along former PBA coaches Jun Celis and Nemie Villegas as his assistants.

== Finals stint ==
After a disappointing finishes in the first two conferences of the season, Manila Beer came back strong in the Third Conference, just like in the previous year. The Brewmasters were on their third finals appearance in franchise history, behind imports Michael Young, a first round pick of the Boston Celtics in the 1984 NBA draft, and Santa Clara star Harold Keeling.

Manila Beer lost to crowd-favorite Ginebra San Miguel in five games in the best-of-seven title series.

== Award ==
Michael Young won the PBA Best Import honors in the 1986 Open Conference, besting two-time best import awardee Billy Ray Bates of Ginebra.

== Won-loss records vs Opponents ==
Team	Win	Loss	1st (Reinforced)	2nd (All-Filipino)	3rd (Open)
Alaska	4	2	1-1	1-1	2-0
Ginebra	1	11	0-2	0-2	1-7
Great Taste	5	2	1-1	0-1	4-0
Magnolia	2	0	N/A	N/A	2-0
Shell	1	5	0-2	0-2	1-1
Tanduay	5	2	0-2	1-0	4-0
RP-Magnolia	1	0	N/A	1-0	N/A
Total	19	22	2-8	3-6	14-8

== Roster ==
Manila Beer roster
Players
Coaches

Pos.	No.	Nat.	Name	Ht.	Wt.
F	2 & 10	(Philippines)	Jesus Migalbin	6 ft 3 in (1.91 m)		San Agustin
F	3	(Philippines)	Edgardo Cordero	6 ft 3 in (1.91 m)		UST
G	4	(Philippines)	Adonis Tierra	5 ft 10 in (1.78 m)		FEATI
C	5	(Philippines)	Abet Guidaben	6 ft 5 in (1.96 m)		USJ–R
G	6	(Philippines)	Fortunato Co, Jr	6 ft 0 in (1.83 m)		Mapúa
F	11	(Philippines)	Gary Vargas	6 ft 2 in (1.88 m)		PSBA
F	13	(Philippines)	Elpidio Villamin	6 ft 3 in (1.91 m)
G	14	(Philippines)	Lim Eng Beng	5 ft 11 in (1.80 m)		De La Salle
F	16	(Philippines)	Angelito Esguerra	6 ft 2 in (1.88 m)		Letran
G	17	(Philippines)	Tito Varela	5 ft 11 in (1.80 m)		UE
G	24	(Philippines)	Ramon Cruz	5 ft 11 in (1.80 m)		UE
G/F	32	(Philippines)	Timoteo Coloso	6 ft 2 in (1.88 m)		Letran
G	36	(Philippines)	Ranulfo Robles	6 ft 1 in (1.85 m)		Letran
F	51 & 11	(Philippines)	Ricardo Cui	6 ft 3 in (1.91 m)		Lyceum

Head coach

- (Philippines) Joe Lipa (1st Conference)
- (Philippines) Tito Eduque

Assistant coach(es)

- (Philippines) Jun Celis
- (Philippines) Nemie Villegas

Legend

- (C) Team captain
- Injured

=== Imports ===
Tournament	Name	#	Height	From
1986 PBA Reinforced Conference	Carlton Cooper	8	6 ft 3 in (1.91 m)	University of Texas at Austin
1986 PBA Reinforced Conference	George Turner	22	6 ft 2 in (1.88 m)	University of California-Irvine
1986 PBA Reinforced Conference	Butch Hays	10	6 ft 3 in (1.91 m)	University of California-Berkeley
1986 PBA Open Conference	Harold Keeling	1	6 ft 2 in (1.88 m)	University of Santa Clara
1986 PBA Open Conference	Michael Young	42	6 ft 5 in (1.96 m)	University of Houston
