= Rene Canent =

Filipino basketball player (died 2026)

Personal information
- Born: 1945 or 1946 Manila, Philippines
- Died: May 31, 2026 (aged 80) United States
- Listed height: 5 ft 8 in (1.73 m)

Career information
- College: JRC
- Playing career: 1970s–1980

Career history
- 1970s–1975: YCO Painters
- 1975–1980: Tanduay

Rene Canent (1945 or 1946 – May 31, 2026) was a Filipino professional basketball player who played for Tanduay of the Philippine Basketball Association from 1975 until 1980. He was also the first president of the PBA Players Association introducing educational benefits for players and their children.

== Early life and education ==
Rene Canent was born in Santa Mesa, Manila and studied at the Jose Rizal College.

== Career ==
=== Collegiate ===
Canent played for the basketball team of Jose Rizal College, helping them win titles in 1963 and 1964 in the National Collegiate Athletic Association (NCAA).

=== Club ===
Canent was part of the YCO Painters which played in the Manila Industrial and Commercial Athletic Association (MICAA) starting in the 1970s.

He played for the Tanduay in the Philippine Basketball Association from 1975 until his retirement in 1980. He was known by the moniker "The Spitfire".

== PBAPA president ==
Shortly prior to his retirement, Canent was made president of the then newly formed PBA Players Association. He was responsible for introducing the benefit of funding the studies of children of players who suited up in the PBA for at least five years. He also helped introduce the benefit of allowing players who played for at least six years to pursue a fully subsidized master's degree.

== Later life and death ==
In 1981, Canent migrated to the United States to live in Los Angeles. There he played for a team in a Filipino-American league in the city. He died in the United States on May 31, 2026 due to a lingering illness at age 80.
