= 1986 PBA season =

12th PBA season

- Duration: April 6, 1986 – December 11, 1986
- Teams: 7
- TV partner: Vintage Sports (PTV)

1986 PBA Draft
- Top draft pick: Rey Cuenco
- Picked by: Alaska Milkmen
- Season MVP: Ramon Fernandez (Tanduay Rhum Makers)
- Reinforced Conference champions: Tanduay Rhum Makers
- Reinforced Conference runners-up: Great Taste Coffee Makers
- All-Filipino Conference champions: Tanduay Rhum Makers
- All-Filipino Conference runners-up: Ginebra San Miguel
- Open Conference champions: Ginebra San Miguel
- Open Conference runners-up: Manila Beer Brewmasters

Seasons
- ← 1985 1987 →

The 1986 PBA season was the 12th season of the Philippine Basketball Association (PBA).

== Board of governors ==
=== Executive committee ===
- Mariano A. Yenko, Jr. (Commissioner)
- Rodriguo Salud (Deputy Commissioner)
- Carlos Palanca III (Chairman, representing Ginebra San Miguel)
- Reynaldo Marquez (Vice Chairman, representing Pilipinas Shell Oilers)
- Andrew H. Jao (Treasurer, representing Manila Beer Brewmasters)

=== Teams ===
Team	Company	Governor
Alaska Milkmen	General Milling Corporation	Wilfred Steven Uytengsu
Ginebra San Miguel	La Tondeña Incorporada	Carlos Palanca III
Great Taste Coffee Makers	Consolidated Foods Corporation	James Go
Manila Beer Brewmasters	Shareholdings, Inc.	Andrew H. Jao
San Miguel Beermen	San Miguel Corporation	Leonides Valencia
Pilipinas Shell Oilers	Pilipinas Shell Petroleum Corporation	Reynaldo Marquez
Tanduay Rhum Makers	Elizalde & Company; Tanduay Distillers, Inc.	Jose Luis Ledesma

== Season highlights ==
- Due to the aftermath of the 1986 People Power Revolution, the uncertainty of opening a new PBA season became imminent after two teams that have connections with the Marcoses (Tanduay and Manila Beer) were unsure if they will still continue in taking part of the league. Likewise, it was then not known who will be in charge of the PBA's main venue, the ULTRA and Vintage Sports TV network partner Maharlika Broadcasting System. The league eventually opened its season at The ULTRA on April 6 and was aired on MBS. MBS will be later renamed as the People's Television Network the same year.
- PBA legal counsel Atty. Rudy Salud was appointed as deputy commissioner after Tommy Manotoc resigned.
- The Alaska Milkmen became the newest team that joined the league while the Magnolia ballclub, one of the founding members of the PBA, took a temporary leave of absence. Magnolia makes its comeback in the Third Conference with a new lineup composed of 10 rookies, eight of which were former national players from the disbanded Northern Consolidated (NCC) team.
- The board of governors approved an amendment to the PBA constitution that replaces the position of the PBA President into the Chairman of the Board of Governors.
- Teams paraded two reinforcements each in the import-laden conferences, which led to a record-breaking success by the league on the last term of PBA chairman Carlos "Honeyboy" Palanca.
- The birth of the most bitter PBA rivalry since the Toyota-Crispa days - that between the Tanduay Rhum Makers and crowd-favorite Ginebra San Miguel - with both teams winning their first championship during the season.

== Opening ceremonies ==
The muses for the participating teams are as follows:

Team	Muse
Alaska Milkmen	Joey Albert
Ginebra San Miguel	Gretchen Barretto
Great Taste Coffee Makers	
Manila Beer Brewmasters	Peachy Sacisas
Shell Oilers	Sabrina Artadi
Tanduay Rhum Makers	

== Champions ==
- Reinforced Conference: Tanduay Rhum Makers
- All-Filipino Conference: Tanduay Rhum Makers
- Open Conference: Ginebra San Miguel
- Team with best win–loss percentage: Ginebra San Miguel (42-23, .647)
- Best Team of the Year: Tanduay Rhum Makers (1st & Final)

== Reinforced Conference ==
=== Elimination round ===
Pos	Team	W	L	PCT	GB	Qualification
1	Great Taste Coffee Makers	8	2	.800	—	Semifinal round
2	Alaska Milkmen	6	4	.600	2	Semifinal round
3	Tanduay Rhum Makers	6	4	.600	2	Semifinal round
4	Ginebra San Miguel	5	5	.500	3	Semifinal round
5	Pilipinas Shell Oilers	3	7	.300	5	Semifinal round
6	Manila Beer Brewmasters	2	8	.200	6	

=== Semifinal round ===
Pos	Team	W	L	PCT	GB	Qualification
1	Great Taste Coffee Makers	12	6	.667 (Note: Head-to-head record: Great Taste 2–2 Tanduay, Great Taste +3)	—	Advance to the Finals
2	Tanduay Rhum Makers	12	6	.667	—	Advance to the Finals
3	Ginebra San Miguel	11	7	.611	1	Proceed to third place playoffs
4	Alaska Milkmen	9	9	.500	3	Proceed to third place playoffs
5	Pilipinas Shell Oilers	4	14	.222	8	

=== Third place playoffs ===
Team 1	Series	Team 2	Game 1	Game 2	Game 3	Game 4	Game 5	Game 6	Game 7
(3) Ginebra San Miguel	4–2	(4) Alaska Milkmen	138–135	147–134	127–130	121–124	148–123	139–137 (OT)	—

=== Finals ===
Team 1	Series	Team 2	Game 1	Game 2	Game 3	Game 4	Game 5	Game 6	Game 7
(1) Great Taste Coffee Makers	2–4	(2) Tanduay Rhum Makers	114–117	126–121 (OT)	110–117	111–112	111–106	109–132	—

- Best Import of the Conference: Rob Williams (Tanduay)

== All-Filipino Conference ==
=== Elimination round ===
Pos	Team	W	L	PCT	GB	Qualification
1	Great Taste Coffee Makers	5	1	.833	—	Advance to semifinal round
2	Tanduay Rhum Makers	5	1	.833	—	Advance to semifinal round
3	Shell Helix Oilers	4	2	.667	1	Proceed to quarterfinal round
4	Manila Beer Brewmasters	3	3	.500	2	Proceed to quarterfinal round
5	Ginebra San Miguel	2	4	.333	3	Proceed to quarterfinal round
6	Alaska Milkmen	1	5	.167 (Note: Quarterfinal round berth playoff: Alaska 100–96 Philippine national team)	4	Proceed to quarterfinal round
7	Philippine national team (G)	1	5	.167	4	

(G) Guests

=== Quarterfinal round ===
Pos	Team	W	L	PCT	GB	Qualification
3	Ginebra San Miguel	5	4	.556	—	Semifinal round
4	Shell Helix Oilers	5	4	.556	—	Semifinal round
5	Alaska Milkmen	3	6	.333	2	
6	Manila Beer Brewmasters	3	6	.333	2	

=== Semifinal round ===
Pos	Team	W	L	PCT	GB	Qualification
1	Tanduay Rhum Makers	4	2	.667 (Note: Head-to-head record: Tanduay 2–1 Ginebra)	—	Advance to the Finals
2	Ginebra San Miguel	4	2	.667	—	Advance to the Finals
3	Great Taste Coffee Makers	3	3	.500	1	Proceed to third place playoffs
4	Pilipinas Shell Oilers	1	5	.167	3	Proceed to third place playoffs

=== Third place playoffs ===
Team 1	Series	Team 2	Game 1	Game 2	Game 3	Game 4	Game 5
(3) Great Taste Coffee Makers	1–3	(4) Pilipinas Shell Oilers	125–128 (OT)	110–101	105–110	90–96	—

=== Finals ===
Team 1	Series	Team 2	Game 1	Game 2	Game 3	Game 4	Game 5
(1) Tanduay Rhum Makers	3–1	(2) Ginebra San Miguel	86–90	118–115 (OT)	79–74	93–92	—

== Open Conference ==
=== Elimination round ===
Pos	Team	W	L	PCT	GB	Qualification
1	Ginebra San Miguel	9	3	.750	—	Advance to semifinal round
2	Manila Beer Brewmasters	9	3	.750	—	Advance to semifinal round
3	Tanduay Rhum Makers	6	6	.500	3	Proceed to quarterfinal round
4	Great Taste Coffee Makers	6	6	.500	3	Proceed to quarterfinal round
5	Formula Shell Spark Aiders	6	6	.500	3	Proceed to quarterfinal round
6	Alaska Milkmen	4	8	.333	5	Proceed to quarterfinal round
7	Magnolia Cheese Makers	2	10	.167	7	

=== Quarterfinal round ===
Pos	Team	W	L	PCT	GB	Qualification
3	Tanduay Rhum Makers	8	7	.533	—	Semifinal round
4	Great Taste Coffee Makers	8	7	.533	—	Semifinal round
5	Formula Shell Spark Aiders	7	8	.467	1	
6	Alaska Milkmen	5	10	.333	3	

=== Semifinal round ===
Pos	Team	W	L	PCT	GB	Qualification
1	Ginebra San Miguel	4	1	.800 (Note: Head-to-head record: Ginebra 3–0 Manila Beer)	—	Advance to the Finals
2	Manila Beer Brewmasters	4	1	.800	—	Advance to the Finals
3	Tanduay Rhum Makers	1	4	.200 (Note: Head-to-head record: Tanduay 3–1 Great Taste)	3	Proceed to third place playoffs
4	Great Taste Coffee Makers	1	4	.200	3	Proceed to third place playoffs

=== Third place playoffs ===
Team 1	Series	Team 2	Game 1	Game 2	Game 3	Game 4	Game 5	Game 6	Game 7
(3) Tanduay Rhum Makers	0–4	(4) Great Taste Coffee Makers	130–146	128–141	128–138	143–170	—	—	—

=== Finals ===
Team 1	Series	Team 2	Game 1	Game 2	Game 3	Game 4	Game 5	Game 6	Game 7
(1) Ginebra San Miguel	4–1	(2) Manila Beer Brewmasters	135–133	111–121	139–130	145–135 (2OT)	130–120	—	—

- Best Import of the Conference: Michael Young (Manila Beer)

== Awards ==
- Most Valuable Player: Ramon Fernandez (Tanduay)
- Rookie of the Year: Dondon Ampalayo (Ginebra)
- Most Improved Player: Ricky Relosa (Alaska)
- Best Import-Reinforced Conference: Rob Williams (Tanduay)
- Best Import-Open Conference: Michael Young (Manila Beer)
- Mythical Five:
  - Ricardo Brown (Great Taste)
  - Robert Jaworski (Ginebra)
  - Ramon Fernandez (Tanduay)
  - Manny Victorino (Great Taste)
  - Freddie Hubalde (Tanduay)
- Mythical Second Team:
  - Chito Loyzaga (Ginebra)
  - Padim Israel (Tanduay)
  - Terry Saldaña (Ginebra)
  - JB Yango (Tanduay)
  - Dondon Ampalayo (Ginebra)
- All-Defensive Team:
  - Chito Loyzaga (Ginebra)
  - Philip Cezar (Shell)
  - Elpidio Villamin (Manila Beer)
  - Ricky Relosa (Alaska)
  - Padim Israel (Tanduay)

== Cumulative standings ==
Pos	Team	Pld	W	L	PCT	Best finish
1	Ginebra San Miguel	65	42	23	.646	Champions
2	Tanduay Rhum Makers	64	37	27	.578	Champions
3	Great Taste Coffee Makers	64	36	28	.563	Third place
4	Manila Beer Brewmasters	41	19	22	.463	Finalist
5	Alaska Milkmen	49	20	29	.408	Semifinalist
6	Shell Oilers/Shell Helix Oilers/Formula Shell Spark Aiders	52	20	32	.385	Third place
7	Magnolia Cheese Makers	12	2	10	.167	Elimination round
8	Philippine national team (G)	7	1	6	.143	Elimination round

(G) Guests

=== Elimination round ===
Pos	Team	Pld	W	L	PCT
1	Great Taste Coffee Makers	28	19	9	.679
2	Tanduay Rhum Makers	28	17	11	.607
3	Ginebra San Miguel	28	16	12	.571
4	Manila Beer Brewmasters	28	14	14	.500
5	Shell Oilers/Shell Helix Oilers/Formula Shell Spark Aiders	28	13	15	.464
6	Alaska Milkmen	28	11	17	.393
7	Magnolia Cheese Makers	12	2	10	.167
8	Philippine national team (G)	6	1	5	.167

(G) Guests

=== Playoffs ===
Pos	Team	Pld	W	L
1	Ginebra San Miguel	37	26	11
2	Tanduay Rhum Makers	36	20	16
3	Great Taste Coffee Makers	36	17	19
4	Alaska Milkmen	21	9	12
5	Shell Oilers/Shell Helix Oilers/Formula Shell Spark Aiders	24	7	17
6	Manila Beer Brewmasters	13	5	8
7	Philippine national team (G)	1	0	1
8	Magnolia Cheese Makers	0	0	0

(G) Guests
