= Fred Reynolds =

American basketball player

Personal information
- Born: August 20, 1960 (age 66) Lufkin, Texas, U.S.
- Listed height: 6 ft 6 in (1.98 m)
- Listed weight: 207 lb (94 kg)

Career information
- High school: Jones (Houston, Texas)
- College: UTEP (1979–1984)
- NBA draft: 1984: 2nd round, 44th overall pick
- Drafted by: Washington Bullets
- Position: Small forward

Career highlights
- First-team All-WAC (1984)
- Stats at Basketball Reference
Medals
Men's basketball
Representing United States
World Championships
Silver medal – second place	1982 Colombia	National team
Pan American Games
Gold medal – first place	1983 Caracas	Team competition

Fred Reynolds (born August 20, 1960) is an American former professional basketball player.

Attended the University of Texas at El Paso from 1979–80 through 1981–82 and 1983–84, sat out of the entire 1982–83 season because of a broken leg but bounced back to become a member of the gold medal-winning United States national team in the 1983 Pan American Games, Reynolds also played for the American squad that placed second to Russia in the 1982 World Basketball championships.

He was taken by the Washington Bullets in the second round of the 1984 NBA draft, has had European experience playing in Belgium and Spain.
