= 1986 PBA draft =

Player selection in Philippine basketball

Overview
- League: Philippine Basketball Association
- First selection: Rey Cuenco (Alaska)

The 1986 Philippine Basketball Association (PBA) rookie draft was an event at which teams drafted players from the amateur ranks.

== Round 1 ==
Pick	Player	Country of origin*	PBA team	College
1	Rey Cuenco	Philippines	Alaska Milkmen	Arellano
2	Ricardo Cui	Philippines	Manila Beer Brewmasters	Lyceum
3	Dondon Ampalayo	Philippines	Ginebra San Miguel	San Jose-Recoletos
4	Aaron Torres	Philippines	Great Taste Coffee Makers	East

== Round 2 ==
Pick	Player	Country of origin*	PBA team	College
	Ludovico Valenciano	Philippines	Alaska Milkmen	Saint La Salle
	Adonis Tierra	Philippines	Manila Beer Brewmasters	FEATI

== Round 3 ==
Pick	Player	Country of origin*	PBA team	College
	Reynaldo Ramos	Philippines	Alaska Milkmen	Trinity

== Undrafted players ==
- Mukesh Advani
- Joshua Villapando
- Raymund Fran
- Chris McGarry
- Alejandro Regis
- Ernesto Basuel
- Francis Moncada
- Meneles Viray

== Notes ==
10 amateur players joined the PBA in the Third Conference when the Magnolia ballclub decided to return after a two-conference leave. Eight former members of the fabled Northern Cement basketball team led by Samboy Lim and Elmer Reyes, who were also part of the RP squad that captured the bronze medal in the Seoul Asian Games, made their debut as professional players.
