= Jerry Eaves =

American basketball player and coach (born 1959)

Personal information
- Born: February 8, 1959 (age 67) Louisville, Kentucky, U.S.
- Listed height: 6 ft 4 in (1.93 m)
- Listed weight: 180 lb (82 kg)

Career information
- High school: Ballard (Louisville, Kentucky)
- College: Louisville (1978–1982)
- NBA draft: 1982: 3rd round, 55th overall pick
- Drafted by: Utah Jazz
- Position: Point guard
- Number: 31, 5, 22
- Coaching career: 1990–present

Career history

Playing
- 1982–1984: Utah Jazz
- 1984: Atlanta Hawks
- 1987: Sacramento Kings

Coaching
- 1990–1994: Howard (assistant)
- 1994–1996: New Jersey Nets (assistant)
- 1996–1999: Louisville (assistant)
- 1999–2002: Charlotte Hornets (assistant)
- 2002–2003: Cleveland Cavaliers (assistant)
- 2003–2012: North Carolina A&T
- 2015–present: Simmons College

Career highlights
- As player: NCAA champion (1980); First-team All-Metro Conference (1981); Second-team All-Metro Conference (1982); McDonald's All-American (1978); Second-team Parade All-American (1978)
- Stats at NBA.com
- Stats at Basketball Reference

Jerry Lee Eaves (born February 8, 1959) is an American head college basketball coach and athletic director at Simmons College of Kentucky in Louisville. He is the former head men's basketball coach at North Carolina Agricultural and Technical State University. Prior to the start of his coaching career, Eaves played in the National Basketball Association (NBA) for parts of four seasons.

Born and raised in Louisville, Kentucky, Eaves played at Ballard High School and the University of Louisville. He played professionally for the Utah Jazz, Atlanta Hawks and Sacramento Kings. Eaves competed on The Amazing Race 32 with his son Frank, which aired in 2020, and were placed ninth and being the third team eliminated.

== Career statistics ==
Legend
GP	Games played	GS	Games started	MPG	Minutes per game
FG%	Field goal percentage	3P%	3-point field goal percentage	FT%	Free throw percentage
RPG	Rebounds per game	APG	Assists per game	SPG	Steals per game
BPG	Blocks per game	PPG	Points per game	**Bold**	Career high

=== NBA ===
==== Regular season ====
Year	Team	GP	GS	MPG	FG%	3P%	FT%	RPG	APG	SPG	BPG	PPG
1982–83	Utah	**82**	**7**	**19.4**	.487	**.125**	.810	**1.5**	**2.6**	**.6**	.0	**9.3**
1983–84	Utah	80	1	12.9	.451	.000	.697	1.1	2.5	.4	**.1**	4.5
1984–85	Atlanta	3	0	12.3	**.500**	–	.833	.0	1.3	.0	.0	3.7
1986–87	Sacramento	3	0	8.7	.125	–	**1.000**	.3	.0	.3	.0	1.3
Career		168	8	16.0	.472	.071	.773	1.2	2.5	.5	.0	6.7

==== Playoffs ====
Year	Team	GP	MPG	FG%	3P%	FT%	RPG	APG	SPG	BPG	PPG
1984	Utah	11	12.0	.478	.333	.769	.9	1.2	.5	.2	5.0
