= Tanduay Rhum Masters =

- Founded: 1975
- Dissolved: 2001 (withdrew in 1987, and readmitted in 1999)
- History: Tanduay Distillery (1975-1977); Tanduay Esquires (1978-1981); YCO-Tanduay (1981–1983); Tanduay Rhum Makers (1983–1987); Tanduay Gold Rhum Masters (1999); Tanduay Rhum Masters (2000–2001)
- Team colors: Tanduay Distillery/Esquires; Red, gold and white Red, black and white YCO-Tanduay; Red, green and white Red, black and white Tanduay Rhum Masters; Red and gold
- Company: Elizalde and Co., Inc. (1975-1987); Tanduay Distillers, Inc. (1999-2001)
- Head coach: Tanduay Distillery/Tanduay ESQ/YCO-Tanduay/Tanduay Rhum Makers (1975-1987); Loreto Carbonell; Roberto Littaua; Carlos Loyzaga; Valentin Eduque; Freddie Webb; Sonny Reyes; Orly Castelo; Arturo Valenzona; Ely Capacio; Tanduay Rhum Masters (1999-2001); Alfrancis Chua; Derrick Pumaren
- Ownership: Manuel "Manolo" Elizalde (1975-1986); Lucio C. Tan Sr. (1999-2001)
- Championships: 3 championships 1986 Reinforced; 1986 All-Filipino; 1987 Open 5 Finals Appearances
Light uniform	Dark uniform

The Tanduay Rhum Makers (1975–1987) and Tanduay Rhum Masters (1999–2001) were two basketball franchises associated with the same Tanduay Distillers liquor brand that played in the Philippine Basketball Association (PBA).

The original franchise, owned by Elizalde & Co., Inc., was a founding member of the PBA. From 1975-1980, the team played under the name Tanduay Distillery; Tanduay ESQ and Tanduay Esquires; then as, YCO-Tanduay in 1981-1983. The final name used by the original franchise was the Tanduay Rhum Makers (1983-1987). The original franchise won a total of three PBA championships. In 1988, its PBA franchise was acquired by Pure Foods Corporation and played as Purefoods.

The second franchise played under the name Tanduay Rhum Masters and was owned by Tanduay Distillers, Inc. (the present owners of the Tanduay liquor business). It first played in the Philippine Basketball League (1997-1999) and joined the PBA (1999-2001). The PBA records of the original Tanduay PBA franchise (1975-1987) were maintained for the second incarnation. Its PBA franchise was sold to FedEx Express in 2002.

== The original Tanduay franchise (Elizalde era, 1975–1987) ==
Businessman Manuel “Manolo” Elizalde formed the Philippines' first basketball dynasty, the YCO Painters, during the post-war era. Players who have donned the famous YCO red and white jersey included Carlos Loyzaga, Carlos Badion, Loreto Carbonell, Ed Ocampo, Mariano Tolentino and Kurt Bachmann. Its rivalry with the Ysmael Steel Admirals preceded that of Crispa and Toyota in the PBA.

The first Tanduay basketball team was organized by Elizalde during the early 1960s to compete in a minor league called Businessmen’s Athletic Association (BAA). This farm team of the YCO Painters had a brief existence.

In 1975, Elizalde became actively involved in the formation of the Philippine Basketball Association as he joined forces with several MICAA team owners to break away from the Basketball Association of the Philippines stranglehold. The YCO Painters maintained their ballclub in the MICAA and their newly-formed professional team was named Tanduay.

=== 1977–1980 ===
With Carlos Loyzaga handling the coaching chores by 1977, replacing Bobby Littaua, Tanduay entered the semifinals for the first time in the 1977 All-Filipino Conference and almost made it to the finals but lost to Mariwasa-Honda Panthers on their last assignment as the Panthers went on to play the Crispa Redmanizers for the championship. The season had a Tanduay player Jaime Taguines becoming the second recipient of the Rookie of the Year honors.

In 1978, Tanduay had their first breakthrough year. After a third and fourth place finishes in the first two conferences of the season, the third conference Invitational championship allows the Esquires to simultaneously field their two imports. Gene Moore and David Payne led the team to score upset victories and enter the finals series against the Toyota Tamaraws. The Esquires lost to defending champion Toyota in four games. Tanduay again produced another Rookie of the Year awardee for the second straight season in Jaime Manansala.

=== 1979–1984 ===
The next six seasons would remain unfruitful and title-less campaign for the Tanduay ballclub despite being competitive and a darkhorse team in the early 1980s, signing some top amateur stars like Rey Lazaro, former San Beda Red Lions Frankie Lim and JB Yango. The team had a revamp of their lineup in 1984, giving up four of its veteran players, Roberto dela Rosa, Victor Sanchez, Alberto Gutierrez and Mike Bilbao to newcomer Beer Hausen.

=== 1985–1987 ===
Following the disbandment of the famed Crispa Redmanizers, the Tanduay Rhum Makers had a massive rebuilding, acquiring Crispa stars Abet Guidaben, Freddie Hubalde and Padim Israel, along with Willie Generalao from Gilbey's Gin. However, three weeks after the start of the 1985 PBA Reinforced Conference, Guidaben was traded in favor of Ramon Fernandez from Manila Beer. Tanduay's coach at that time, Orly Castelo, was also replaced by former Gilbey's Gin coach Arturo Valenzona.

Tanduay finally won the first of three PBA championships beginning in the 1986 First Conference, behind imports Rob Williams and Andre McKoy. After winning its first title, the team brought the championship trophy to the grave of their late owner, Manolo Elizalde, who died a year before. Tanduay won their second straight championship in the 1986 PBA All-Filipino Conference and their third title in the 1987 PBA Open Conference with best import David Thirdkill.

=== Disbandment ===
A business blackeye occurred in late 1987 when a couple of Tanduay drinkers died allegedly owing to the liquor. This caused a major backlash in terms of sales as revenues collapsed and put parent company Elizalde & Company Inc. near bankruptcy.

Pure Foods Corporation, then a subsidiary of Ayala Corporation, acquired Tanduay's PBA franchise. The franchise would play under the name Purefoods beginning the 1988 PBA season.

The Tanduay business enterprise was acquired by the Lucio Tan group of companies.

== Second Tanduay franchise (Tan era, 1997-2001) ==
=== In the Philippine Basketball League (1997-1999) ===
In 1997, the Tanduay name resurfaced in the Philippine basketball scene at the Philippine Basketball League under the ownership of Lucio Tan group of companies and managed by son Lucio "Bong" K. Tan, Jr. Prior to using the name "Tanduay Gold Rhum Masters", this team was originally known as Stag Pale Pilseners from 1995-1996, with Marlou Aquino, Bal David and Jason Webb in the lineup. The Rhum Masters won several PBL crowns under coach Alfrancis Chua and players Eric Menk, Jomer Rubi, Chris Cantonjos and Mark Telan. It also held a PBL-record 18 straight wins in the 1998–1999 Yakult PBL Centennial Cup, but lost in five games to Doctor J Rubbing Alcohol, when the Centennial Rhum Masters blew a 2–0 lead in the best-of-five affair. After the team moved to the PBA, Asia Brewery retained the PBL franchise and was renamed Colt 45 with Renren Ritualo leading the squad. Colt 45 placed fourth in the 1999 PBL Challenge Cup before disbanding.

=== Return to the PBA (1999–2001) ===
In 1999, Tanduay made its return to the PBA. As part of the agreement, the league allowed six players from Tanduay's PBL lineup to be elevated. Tanduay also acquired Fil-American Earl Sonny Alvarado as the top pick. The records from the original Tanduay franchise (1975-1987) were retained for this franchise.

In its first season, Tanduay placed second to Shell in the 1999 PBA All-Filipino Conference but their second stint in the PBA were marred by several controversies such as the deportation of alleged "Fil-sham" (bogus Filipino) Alvarado which led to a forfeiture of several Tanduay games during the 2000 season. In the 2001 offseason, Tanduay made soundwaves in the PBA when they signed Danny Ildefonso of corporate rival San Miguel Beermen a whopping 16-year, 98 million peso offersheet. The league though, nullified the said deal since it was believed that the offersheet violated the team's salary cap.

Bong Tan also made a controversial comment calling the PBA, "a San Miguel league", a reference to a speculation that the PBA is favoring the then-San Miguel Corporation teams San Miguel and Barangay Ginebra. It was also said that Tanduay violated the PBA's salary cap many times by having their players sign a separate contract apart from the required PBA Uniform Player's Contract that made the players richer than any PBA team's bench players by a few hundred thousand pesos. This was already denied by the management.

=== Disbandment ===
Realizing its failure to win a championship despite a stellar line-up of Fil-American players and established veterans, Tanduay disbanded after the 2001 season, selling its PBA franchise to FedEx Express for a reported sum of PHP 60-75 million. A firesale ensued as the Rhum Masters traded their key players Eric Menk (to Barangay Ginebra Kings), Dondon Hontiveros (to the San Miguel Beermen) and Jeffrey Cariaso (to the Coca-Cola Tigers).

== Season-by-season records ==
Legend
Champion

Runner-up

Third place

Season	Conference	Team name	Overall record			Finals
Season	Conference	Team name	W	L	%	Finals
1975	First Conference	Tanduay Rhum	6	18	.250	
1975	Second Conference	Tanduay Rhum	6	18	.250	
1975	All-Philippine	Tanduay Rhum	6	18	.250	
1976	First Conference	Tanduay Rhum	11	21	.344	
1976	Second Conference	Tanduay Rhum	11	21	.344	
1976	All-Philippine	Tanduay Rhum	11	21	.344	
1977	All-Filipino Conference	Tanduay Rhum	29	28	.509	
1977	Open Conference	Tanduay Rhum	29	28	.509	
1977	Invitational Conference	Tanduay Rhum	29	28	.509	
1978	All-Filipino Conference	Tanduay Rhum	24	31	.436	
1978	Open Conference	Tanduay Rhum	24	31	.436	
1978	Invitational Conference	Tanduay Rhum	24	31	.436	Toyota 3, Tanduay 1
1979	All-Filipino Conference	Tanduay Rhum	24	23	.511	
1979	Open Conference	Tanduay Rhum	24	23	.511	
1979	Invitational Conference	Tanduay Rhum	24	23	.511	
1980	Open Conference	Tanduay Rhum	16	23	.410	
1980	Invitational Conference	Tanduay Rhum	16	23	.410	
1980	All-Filipino Conference	Tanduay Rhum	16	23	.410	
1981	Open Conference	YCO-Tanduay Rhum	13	29	.310	
1981	Reinforced Filipino Conference	YCO-Tanduay Rhum	13	29	.310	
1982	Reinforced Filipino Conference	YCO-Tanduay Rhum	21	20	.512	
1982	Invitational Conference	YCO-Tanduay Rhum	21	20	.512	
1982	Open Conference	YCO-Tanduay Rhum	21	20	.512	
1983	All-Filipino Conference	Tanduay Rhum Makers	24	29	.453	
1983	Reinforced Filipino Conference	Tanduay Rhum Makers	24	29	.453	
1983	Open Conference	Tanduay Rhum Makers	24	29	.453	
1984	First All-Filipino Conference	Tanduay Rhum Makers	14	26	.350	
1984	Second All-Filipino Conference	Tanduay Rhum Makers	14	26	.350	
1984	Invitational Conference	Tanduay Rhum Makers	14	26	.350	
1985	Open Conference	Tanduay Rhum Makers	24	35	.407	
1985	All-Filipino Conference	Tanduay Rhum Makers	24	35	.407	
1985	Reinforced Conference	Tanduay Rhum Makers	24	35	.407	
1986	Reinforced Conference	Tanduay Rhum Makers	37	27	.578	Tanduay 4, Great Taste 2
1986	All-Filipino Conference	Tanduay Rhum Makers	37	27	.578	Tanduay 3, Ginebra 1
1986	Open Conference	Tanduay Rhum Makers	37	27	.578	
1987	Open Conference	Tanduay Rhum Makers	22	23	.489	Tanduay 4, Great Taste 1
1987	All-Filipino Conference	Tanduay Rhum Makers	22	23	.489	
1987	Reinforced Conference	Tanduay Rhum Makers	22	23	.489	
1988	Open Conference	Tanduay disbanded from the PBA.				
1988	All-Filipino Conference	Tanduay disbanded from the PBA.				
1988	Reinforced Conference	Tanduay disbanded from the PBA.				
1989	Open Conference	Tanduay disbanded from the PBA.				
1989	All-Filipino Conference	Tanduay disbanded from the PBA.				
1989	Reinforced Conference	Tanduay disbanded from the PBA.				
1990	First Conference	Tanduay disbanded from the PBA.				
1990	All-Filipino Conference	Tanduay disbanded from the PBA.				
1990	Third Conference	Tanduay disbanded from the PBA.				
1991	First Conference	Tanduay disbanded from the PBA.				
1991	All-Filipino Conference	Tanduay disbanded from the PBA.				
1991	Third Conference	Tanduay disbanded from the PBA.				
1992	First Conference	Tanduay disbanded from the PBA.				
1992	All-Filipino Conference	Tanduay disbanded from the PBA.				
1992	Third Conference	Tanduay disbanded from the PBA.				
1993	All-Filipino Cup	Tanduay disbanded from the PBA.				
1993	Commissioner's Cup	Tanduay disbanded from the PBA.				
1993	Governors Cup	Tanduay disbanded from the PBA.				
1994	All-Filipino Cup	Tanduay disbanded from the PBA.				
1994	Commissioner's Cup	Tanduay disbanded from the PBA.				
1994	Governors Cup	Tanduay disbanded from the PBA.				
1995	All-Filipino Cup	Tanduay disbanded from the PBA.				
1995	Commissioner's Cup	Tanduay disbanded from the PBA.				
1995	Governors Cup	Tanduay disbanded from the PBA.				
1996	All-Filipino Cup	Tanduay disbanded from the PBA.				
1996	Commissioner's Cup	Tanduay disbanded from the PBA.				
1996	Governors Cup	Tanduay disbanded from the PBA.				
1997	All-Filipino Cup	Tanduay disbanded from the PBA.				
1997	Commissioner's Cup	Tanduay disbanded from the PBA.				
1997	Governors Cup	Tanduay disbanded from the PBA.				
1998	All-Filipino Cup	Tanduay disbanded from the PBA.				
1998	Commissioner's Cup	Tanduay disbanded from the PBA.				
1998	Centennial Cup	Tanduay disbanded from the PBA.				
1998	Governors Cup	Tanduay disbanded from the PBA.				
1999	All-Filipino Cup	Tanduay Rhum Masters	29	21	.580	Shell 4, Tanduay 2
1999	Commissioner's Cup	Tanduay Rhum Masters	29	21	.580	
1999	Governors Cup	Tanduay Rhum Masters	29	21	.580	
2000	All-Filipino Cup	Tanduay Rhum Masters	15	5	.750	
2000	Commissioner's Cup	Tanduay Rhum Masters	7	8	.467	
2000	Governors Cup	Tanduay Rhum Masters	6	5	.545	
2001	All-Filipino Cup	Tanduay Rhum Masters	5	9	.357	
2001	Commissioner's Cup	Tanduay Rhum Masters	4	7	.364	
2001	Governors Cup	Tanduay Rhum Masters	5	8	.385	
Overall record			336	396	.459	3 championships

== Awards ==
=== Individual awards ===
PBA Most Valuable Player	Finals MVP	PBA Best Player of the Conference
Ramon Fernandez - 1986		Eric Menk - 1999 All-Filipino
PBA Rookie of the Year Award	PBA All-Defensive Team	PBA Mythical First Team
Jimmy Taguines - 1977; Jimmy Manansala - 1978	Padim Israel - 1986; Eric Menk - 1999; Jeffrey Cariaso - 2000	Ramon Fernandez - 1986; Freddie Hubalde - 1986; Sonny Alvarado - 1999
PBA Mythical Second Team	PBA Most Improved Player	PBA Sportsmanship Award
Ramon Fernandez - 1985, 1987; Willie Generalao - 1985; Padim Israel - 1986; JB Yango - 1986; Eric Menk - 1999; Jeffrey Cariaso - 2000; Rudy Hatfield - 2000	Padim Israel - 1985	
PBA Best Import		
Russell Murray - 1981 Reinforced Filipino; Rob Williams - 1986 Reinforced; David Thirdkill - 1987 Open		

=== PBA Press Corps Individual Awards ===
PBA Scoring Leader
Eric Menk - 1999-2001

== Notable players ==
In alphabetical order. Members of PBA Hall of Fame and PBA 25 Greatest Players are in boldface.

=== First Tanduay team (Elizalde era, 1975-1987) ===
- **Ramon Fernandez** - #19
- **Abet Guidaben** - #5
- **Freddie Hubalde** - #10
- Allan Abelgas - #34
- Dennis Abbatuan - #18
- Ronnie Albor - #16
- Zito "Chito" Bacon - #5
- Raymundo "Chuck" Barreiro - #4
- Miguel “Mike” Bilbao - #4, #6, #20, #40
- Rene Canent - #18
- Eleazar "Ely" Capacio - #15
- David "Boy" Cezar - #17
- Benjamin “Benjie” Cleofas - #15
- Ricardo "Joy" Cleofas - #16
- Ramon "Onchie" dela Cruz - #9
- Roberto "Bert" dela Rosa - #7
- Valerio "Botchok" delos Santos - #10
- Joselito "Lito" Eguia - #12
- Angelito "Itoy" Esguerra - #16
- Wilfredo “Willie” Generalao - #42
- Alberto "Abet" Gutierrez - #9 & #13
- Cesar "Boy" Ijares - #36
- Federico “Padim” Israel #17
- Rudolfo "Rudy" Lalota - #9
- Zaldy Latoza - #10
- Reynaldo "Rey" Lazaro - #12
- Frankie Lim - #4, #14
- Geronimo Lucido - #12 1976 Rookie of the Year
- Jaime "Jimmy" Manansala - #11 1978 Rookie of the Year
- Alexander "Alex" Marquez #44 - "The Kamikaze Kid"
- Abelardo "Abe" Monzon #2, #22 & #44
- Horacio "Ace" Moreno - #88 & #8
- Jerry Pingoy - #14
- Marte Samson - #11
- Quirino "Rino" Salazar - #7
- Victor "Vic" Sanchez - #14, #12 – "Rambo"
- David "Dave" Supnet #66 & #6
- Jaime "Jimmy" Taguines - #44 - 1977 Rookie of the Year
- Alex Tan -#40
- Antonio "Tony" Torrente - #7
- Reynaldo "Rey" Vallejo -#1
- Luis "Tito" Varela -#32 - "Kojak"
- Freddie Webb - #14 – "Fastbreak Freddie"
- Jose Bernardo "JB" Yango - #24 - "The Cuyapo Kid"

==== Imports ====
- Benny "The Outlaw" Anders #0 (1986)
- Odell Ball #41 (1980)
- Curtis Berry #00 (1982)
- Bill Bozeat #12 (1976)
- Kevin Cluess #35 (1980)
- Bernie Harris #35 (1977)
- Mark Haymore #32 (1981)
- Jerome Henderson #31 (1982)
- Tim Hirten #20 (1976)
- Andre McKoy #33 (1986)
- George Melton #33 (1983)
- Gene Moore (1978, 1981)
- Russell Murray #33 (1981-1982)
- David Payne #36 (1978)
- David Pope #66 (1985)
- Lawyer (Butch) Taylor #44 (1980)
- John Terry #24 (1975)
- David Thirdkill #22 (1987)
- Andy Thompson #22 (1986)
- John Q. Trapp #34 (1975)
- Ronnie Valentine - #44 (1985)
- Freeman Williams #20 (1987)
- Rob Williams #21 (1986)
- Merlin Wilson #44 (1979, 1985)
- Francois Wise #3 (1983)

=== Second Tanduay team (Tan era, 1999-2001) ===
- Rene Alforque #18
- Sonny Alvarado #15 - "The Punisher"
- Chris Cantonjos #33
- Jeffrey Cariaso #28 – "The Jet"
- Jayvee Gayoso #22 – "Mr. Adrenaline"
- Dondon Hontiveros #7 - "Cebuano Hotshot"
- Rudy Hatfield – "The H-Bomb" #34
- Pido Jarencio #25 – "The Fireman"
- Bobby Jose #11 – "The Firecracker"
- Noli Locsin #6 – "The Tank"
- Eric Menk #30 - "Major Pain"
- Dindo Pumaren #10 – "The Bullet"
- Mark Telan #13
- Jomar Rubi #7
- Jason Webb #1
- Bong Hawkins
- Bonel Balingit
- Jon Ordono

==== Imports ====
- Maurice Bell #3/4 (2000-2001)
- Joe Ira Clark #24 (1999-2000)
- Ronnie Fields #20 (1999)
- Kevin Freeman #33 (2001)
- Billy Thomas #12 (2001)

== See also ==
- YCO Painters (precursor of the first Tanduay team)
- Stag Pale Pilseners (precursor of the second Tanduay team)
- Tanduay Light Rhum Masters (PBA D-League team
- Batangas City Embassy Chill

Preceded by (start)	PBA teams genealogies 1975–1987	Succeeded by Star Hotshots
Preceded by (elevated from the Philippine Basketball League)	PBA teams genealogies 1999–2001	Succeeded by FedEx Express
