= Rob Williams (basketball) =

American basketball player (1961–2014)

Personal information
- Born: May 5, 1961 Houston, Texas, U.S.
- Died: March 10, 2014 (aged 52) Katy, Texas, U.S.
- Listed height: 6 ft 2 in (1.88 m)
- Listed weight: 175 lb (79 kg)

Career information
- High school: Milby (Houston, Texas)
- College: Houston (1979–1982)
- NBA draft: 1982: 1st round, 19th overall pick
- Drafted by: Denver Nuggets
- Position: Point guard
- Number: 21

Career history
- 1982–1984: Denver Nuggets
- 1984–1985: Louisville Catbirds
- 1984–1985: Lancaster Lightning
- 1985: Long Island Knights
- 1986: Tanduay Rhum Makers

Career highlights
- PBA champion (1986 Reinforced); PBA Best Import (1986 Reinforced); Third-team All-American – AP (1981); SWC Player of the Year (1981); 3× First-team All-SWC (1980–1982); Third-team Parade All-American (1979)
- Stats at NBA.com
- Stats at Basketball Reference

Robert Aaron Williams (May 5, 1961 – March 10, 2014), was an American professional basketball player who was selected by the Denver Nuggets in the first round (19th pick overall) of the 1982 NBA draft.

A 6-foot-2 point guard from the University of Houston, Williams played in two National Basketball Association (NBA) seasons for the Nuggets. When Williams reported to Denver's training camp as a rookie, he was badly out of shape, prompting Nuggets coach Doug Moe to describe Williams as "a fat little hog".

Williams' collegiate career included a trip to the 1982 NCAA Final Four, where his Houston Cougars, later to be known as Phi Slama Jama, fell to the University of North Carolina Tar Heels in the National Semifinals.

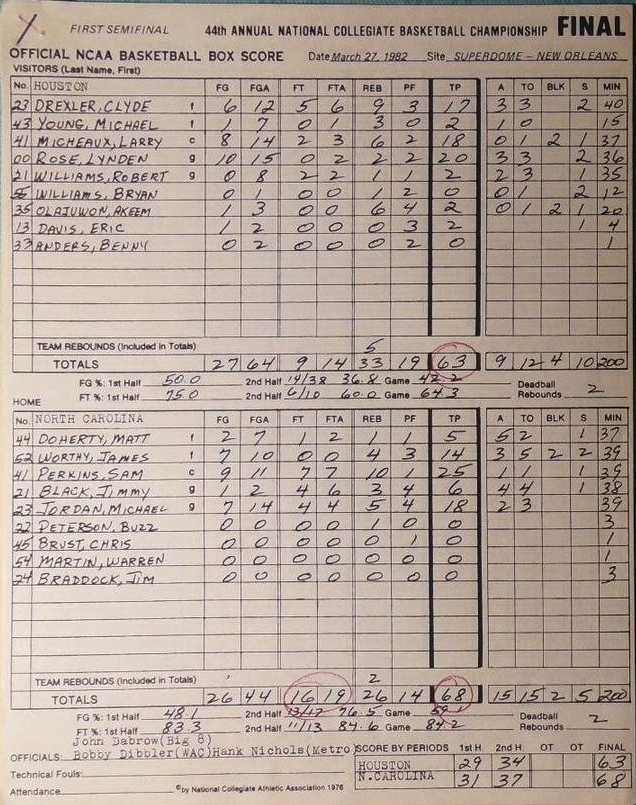
In 1982, Rob Williams shot a tournament worst 0–8 from the floor. In this game, he was primarily guarded by Jimmy Black.

A former star at Milby High School in Houston, Williams was an electrifying player for the University of Houston, averaging 16 points per game as a freshman, 25 per game as a sophomore, and 21 points per game for the 1982 Final Four team. Williams was an All American and perennial All Southwest Conference performer. His collegiate teammates included Hakeem Olajuwon, Clyde Drexler, Michael Young, Benny Anders and Larry Micheaux among others.

In his NBA career, Williams played in 153 games and scored a total of 1,319 points. Following his brief NBA career, he played professionally in the Continental Basketball Association, Italy, Australia, Spain, and the Philippines.

In 1986, Williams played for Tanduay Rhum in the Philippine Basketball Association's (PBA) Reinforced Conference that year, where teams were allowed to suit up two imports no taller than 6 ft 3 in. Along with partner Andre McKoy and local superstars Ramon Fernandez, Freddie Hubalde and Willie Generalao, among others, the flamboyant and sweet-shooting Williams led Tanduay to its first championship in franchise history.

In a May 2005 Houston Chronicle story, Williams admitted using drugs while he played. He suffered a stroke in January 1998 that left him blind in his left eye and partially paralyzed along the left side of his body.

Williams and his wife had operated a care facility for mentally-challenged adults in Katy, Texas.

On March 10, 2014, Rob Williams died of congestive heart failure at age 52.

== Career statistics ==
Legend
GP	Games played	GS	Games started	MPG	Minutes per game
FG%	Field goal percentage	3P%	3-point field goal percentage	FT%	Free throw percentage
RPG	Rebounds per game	APG	Assists per game	SPG	Steals per game
BPG	Blocks per game	PPG	Points per game	**Bold**	Career high

=== NBA ===
==== Regular season ====
Year	Team	GP	GS	MPG	FG%	3P%	FT%	RPG	APG	SPG	BPG	PPG
1982–83	Denver	74	33	19.5	.408	.133	.753	1.8	4.9	**1.2**	**.2**	7.0
1983–84	Denver	**79**	**66**	**24.4**	**.461**	**.319**	**.818**	**2.5**	**5.9**	1.1	.1	**10.2**
Career		153	99	22.0	.439	.274	.789	2.2	5.4	1.1	.1	8.6

==== Playoffs ====
Year	Team	GP	MPG	FG%	3P%	FT%	RPG	APG	SPG	BPG	PPG
1983	Denver	**7**	19.1	.444	**.667**	**1.000**	1.9	**5.3**	**1.1**	.1	8.1
1984	Denver	5	**29.8**	**.447**	.385	.833	3.8	4.8	.6	**.2**	**11.4**
Career		12	23.6	.446	.438	.895	2.7	5.1	.9	.2	9.5
