= Padim Israel =

Filipino basketball player

Federico "Padim" Israel
Personal information
- Born: September 2, 1956 (age 70) Philippines
- Listed height: 6 ft 3 in (1.91 m)
- Listed weight: 200 lb (91 kg)

Career information
- College: Ateneo
- Playing career: 1981–1992
- Position: Small forward / power forward

Career history
- 1981-1984: Crispa Redmanizers
- 1985-1987: Tanduay Rhum Makers
- 1988: Purefoods Hotdogs
- 1989-1992: Presto Tivoli

Career highlights
- Most Improved Player (1985)
Medals
Men's basketball
Representing Philippines
SEA Games
Silver medal – second place	1979 Jakarta	Team

Federico Israel, Jr. (born September 2, 1956), better known as Padim Israel, is a former Filipino basketball player.

He enrolled at Ateneo de Manila University in 1973 and saw action for Ateneo's varsity five. In his third year, he was asked to try out with the Blue Eagles and coach Baby Dalupan took him in. Padim spent three years playing for the Ateneo seniors in the NCAA from 1975-1978. He was taken in by the Crispa team in the MICAA and at the same time tried out for the national team.

From Crispa, he got his release to play for APCOR under coach Turo Valenzona, a new team that entered in the MICAA in 1979. After the league folded up, Padim was acquired by Crispa in the PBA, along with his three other APCOR teammates; Elpidio Villamin, Ramon Cruz and Arturo Cristobal.

Known as the "Defensive Specialist", Israel would also play for Tanduay, Purefoods and Presto. He was part of the Grandslam-winning Crispa team in 1983 and during his stint with Tanduay, he won three more championships from 1986 to 1987, playing alongside Ramon Fernandez, Freddie Hubalde, JB Yango and Willie Generalao.

== Personal life ==
Israel married actress Rio Locsin and became stepfather to Paula & Jabba (Locsin's daughters from her previous marriage to actor-director Al Tantay) and father to his youngest and only daughter Joses. Padim is now a pastor of a Christian denomination.
