= 50 Greatest Players in PBA History =

The 50 Greatest Players in PBA History is a list of players chosen in 2000, 2015, and 2025 to honor the 25th, 40th, and 50th anniversaries of the Philippine Basketball Association (PBA), respectively, with the list expanding for each milestone.

The first set, known as the 25 Greatest Players, was awarded when the league celebrated its 25th anniversary in 2000. During its silver anniversary, a TV special was held at the Araneta Coliseum on April 9. In 2015, 15 players were added to the list to commemorate the league's 40th anniversary. The awarding was held at the Newport Performing Arts Theater at Resorts World Manila on April 8. The award was rechristened as FAB @ 40 (40th Greatest Players).

In 2025, the league added an additional 10 players to the list for the 50th anniversary, with the list renamed as the 50 Greatest Players. Similar to the previous two sets, there will be a pair of celebrations honoring the Greatest Players. The first was held on April 11 at Solaire Resort North to honor the ten new additions. The second will be held on October 5 for the opening ceremony of the 2025–26 PBA season, which will feature a reunion of all living Greatest Players.

== Criteria ==
The following criteria were used by a committee in selecting players for the first 25 players in the list:

- The player must have played at least four full seasons with the league.
- The player must be a recipient of a major award (either an MVP or Rookie of the Year awardee or a member of the mythical selection, or all-defensive teams)
- The player must have done a major impact with the sport and the league.
- The player must have contributed towards the positive development of basketball in the country.

== Players ==
Italics	Denotes player who was active in the PBA at the time of induction
*	Elected to the PBA Hall of Fame
All-Star	Denotes number of All-Star appearances
Year	Denotes year of PBA Hall of Fame induction

=== 25 Greatest Players (2000) ===
Name	School	Teams played for (years)	MVP won	All-Star	Year	Ref
Johnny Abarrientos	FEU	Alaska (1993–2001); Pop Cola (2001–2002); Coca-Cola (2002–2006); Barangay Ginebra (2006–2009, 2010)	1 (1996)	7 (1994, 1995, 1996, 1997, 1998, 1999, 2001)		
Bogs Adornado*	UST	Crispa (1975–1979); U/Tex (1979–1982); Great Taste (1982–1984); Shell (1985–1986); Hills Bros/Alaska (1987)	3 (1975, 1976, 1981)	n/a	2005	
Renato Agustin	Lyceum	San Miguel (1989–1996); Sunkist/Pop Cola (1996–1997); Sta Lucia (1999–2000); Red Bull (2000–2001)	1 (1992)	6 (1991, 1992, 1993, 1994, 1995, 1996)		
Francis Arnaiz*	Ateneo	Toyota (1975–1983); Gilbey's Gin/Ginebra (1984–1986)	none	n/a	2005	
Ricardo Brown*	Pepperdine, DLSU	Great Taste (1983–1987); San Miguel (1987–1989)	1 (1985)	n/a	2009	
Allan Caidic*	UE	Great Taste/Presto (1987–1992); San Miguel (1993–1998); Barangay Ginebra (1999)	1 (1990)	8 (1989, 1990, 1991, 1992, 1993, 1994, 1995, 1998)	2009	
Hector Calma*	Adamson	San Miguel (1986–1994)	none	3 (1989, 1990, 1993)	2009	
Philip Cezar*	JRU	Crispa (1975–1984); Shell (1985–1986); Great Taste/Presto (1987–1989); Ginebra (1990–1991)	1 (1980)	2 (1989, 1990)	2005	
Atoy Co*	Mapúa	Crispa (1975–1984); Manila Beer (1985–1986); Great Taste/Presto (1987–1988)	1 (1979)	n/a	2005	
Jerry Codiñera	UE	Purefoods (1988–1999); Mobiline/Talk 'N Text (1999–2002); FedEx (2002–2005–06)	none	11 (1989, 1990, 1991, 1992, 1993, 1994, 1995, 1996, 1997, 1998, 1999)		
Kenneth Duremdes	Adamson	Sunkist/Pop Cola (1995–1997); Alaska (1998–2002); Sta. Lucia (2003–2006–07); Coca-Cola (2007–08)	1 (1998)	9 (1995, 1996, 1997, 1998, 1999, 2000, 2001, 2003, 2004)		
Bernie Fabiosa	USJ-R	Crispa (1975–1984); Shell (1985–1986); Presto (1987–1989); Purefoods (1990); Diet Sarsi/Swift (1991)	none	n/a		
Ramon Fernandez*	San Carlos	Toyota (1975–1983); Beer Hausen/Manila Beer (1984–1985); Tanduay (1986–1987); Purefoods (1988); San Miguel (1988–1994)	4 (1982, 1984, 1986, 1988)	5 (1989, 1990, 1991, 1993, 1994)	2005	
Danny Florencio*	UST	U/Tex (1975–1976); 7-Up (1977); Toyota (1977–1982); Galerie Dominique (1983)	none	n/a	2007	
Alberto Guidaben*	USJ-R	Crispa (1975–1984); Tanduay (1985); Manila Beer (1986); San Miguel (1987–1988); Purefoods (1988); Alaska (1989); Pepsi/7-Up (1990–1993); Shell (1994–1995)	2 (1983, 1987)	3 (1992, 1993, 1994)	2007	
Freddie Hubalde*	Mapúa	Crispa (1975–1984); Tanduay (1985–1987); Purefoods (1988); Shell (1988–1989); Añejo (1990–1991)	1 (1977)	n/a	2011	
Robert Jaworski*	UE	Toyota (1975–1983); Gilbey's Gin/Añejo/Ginebra (1984–1997)	1 (1978)	4 (1989, 1990, 1991, 1992)	2005	
Jojo Lastimosa	Ateneo, USJ-R	Purefoods (1988–1991); Alaska (1992–2000, 2002–2003); Pop Cola (2000–2002)	none	8 (1989, 1990, 1991, 1992, 1993, 1994, 1996, 1998)		
Lim Eng Beng*	DLSU	Carrier (1975); U/Tex (1976–1982); San Miguel (1983); Crispa (1984); Shel Azodrin (1985); Manila Beer (1986)	none	n/a	2013	
Samboy Lim*	Letran	San Miguel (1986–1997)	none	5 (1989, 1990, 1992, 1993, 1996)	2009	
Ronnie Magsanoc*	UP	Shell (1989–1999); Sta Lucia (2000–2001); Purefoods (2002)	none	7 (1989, 1990, 1991, 1992, 1993, 1994, 1995)	2013	
Vergel Meneses	JRU	Presto (1992); Sta. Lucia (1993); Swift/Sunkist/Pop Cola (1994–1999); Ginebra (1999–2002); FedEx (2002–2004–05); Red Bull (2004–05–2005–06); Talk 'N Text (2006–07)	1 (1995)	10 (1992, 1993, 1994, 1995, 1996, 1997, 1998, 2000, 2003, 2004)		
Manny Paner*	UV	Royal Tru-Orange (1975–1977); Great Taste (1978–1980); CDCP (1981); Royal/San Miguel/Magnolia (1982–1986)	none	n/a	2007	
Alvin Patrimonio*	Mapúa	Purefoods (1988–2004–05)	4 (1991, 1993, 1994, 1997)	12 (1989, 1990, 1991, 1992, 1993, 1995, 1996, 1997, 1998, 1999, 2000, 2001)	2011	
Benjie Paras*	UP	Shell (1989–2002); San Miguel (2003)	2 (1989, 1999)	9 (1989, 1990, 1991, 1992, 1994, 1995, 1996, 1999, 2000)	2013	

=== 40 Greatest Players (2015) ===
The fifteen selected players were added on top of the original 25 players.

Name	School	Teams played for (years)	MVP won	All-Star	Ref
Jimmy Alapag*	Cal. State	Talk 'N Text (2003–2015); Meralco (2015–2016)	1 (2011)	11 (2003–2011, 2014–2015)	
Marlou Aquino*	Adamson	Ginebra/Gordon's Gin/Barangay Ginebra (1996–2000); Sta. Lucia (2000–2010); Meralco (2010–2011)	none	6 (1996, 1997, 1998, 1999, 2000, 2003)	
Mark Caguioa	Glendale CC	Barangay Ginebra (2001–2020)	1 (2012)	13 (2001, 2004–2008, 2011–2013, 2015–2017, 2019)	
Jayson Castro	PCU	Talk 'N Text/TNT (2008–present)	none	7 (2013–2019)	
Danny Ildefonso*	NU	San Miguel/Petron Blaze (1998–2013); Meralco (2013–2015)	2 (2000, 2001)	8 (1999–2001, 2003–2005, 2007, 2009)	
Jayjay Helterbrand*	Kentucky State	Barangay Ginebra (2000–2017)	1 (2009)	6 (2005–2010)	
Chito Loyzaga*	San Beda	YCO-Tanduay (1981); Toyota (1983); Great Taste (1984–1985); Ginebra (1986–1993)	none	4 (1990, 1991, 1992, 1993)	
Eric Menk*	Lake Superior State	Tanduay (1999–2001); Barangay Ginebra (2001–2013); GlobalPort (2013–2014); Alaska (2014–2016)	1 (2005)	10 (1999–2000, 2003–2007, 2009–2011)	
Willie Miller*	Letran	Batang Red Bull (2001–2003); Talk 'N Text (2004–2006); Alaska (2006–2010); Ginebra (2010–2011); Barako Bull (2011–2012); GlobalPort (2012–2013); Barako Bull (2013–2014); Talk 'N Text (2015)	2 (2002, 2007)	9 (2001, 2003–2004, 2006–2011)	
Marc Pingris	FEU, PSBA	FedEx Express (2004–2005); Purefoods (2005–2008); Magnolia/San Miguel (2008–2009); Purefoods/B-Meg/San Mig Coffee/Star (2009–2019)	none	14 (2005–2018)	
Kerby Raymundo*	Letran	Red Bull (2000–2001); Purefoods/B-Meg (2002–2012); Barangay Ginebra (2012–2013); Meralco (2013)	none	10 (2001, 2003–2011)	
Arwind Santos	FEU	Air21 (2006–2009); San Miguel (2009–2021); NorthPort (2021–present)	1 (2013)	11 (2008–2015, 2017-2019)	
Asi Taulava	BYU	Talk 'N Text (1999–2007); Coca-Cola Tigers (2007–2010); Meralco (2010–2012); Air21 (2013–2014); NLEX (2014–present)	1 (2003)	17 (1999, 2001, 2003–2012, 2015–2019)	
Kelly Williams	Oakland	Sta. Lucia Realtors (2006–2010); Talk 'N Text/TNT (2010–2019, 2021–present)	1 (2008)	5 (2007–2011)	
James Yap	UE	Purefoods/B-Meg/San Mig Coffee/Star (2004–2016); Rain or Shine (2016–present)	2 (2006, 2010)	16 (2004–2019)	

=== 50 Greatest Players (2025) ===
The ten selected players were added on top of the 40 previously selected players.

On February 3, 2025, league commissioner Willie Marcial announced that a selection panel was formed to select the next ten players to join the Greatest Players list for the league's 50th anniversary that year. The panel included previous selections Allan Caidic, Atoy Co, and Ramon Fernandez, former coach Dante Silverio, former commissioner Sonny Barrios, former sports editors Ding Marcelo of the Manila Bulletin and Al Mendoza of the Philippine Daily Inquirer, the Philippine Sportswriters Association president and current The Philippine Star sports editor Nelson Beltran, and veteran broadcasters Joaquin Henson and Andy Jao.

Name	School	Teams played for (years)	MVP won	All-Star	Ref
Nelson Asaytono	UM	Purefoods (1989–1991); Swift/Sunkist (1992–1996); San Miguel (1996–1998); Pop Cola (1999–2001); Red Bull (2002–2006)	none	10 (1989–1993, 1995–1999)	
Jeffrey Cariaso	Sonoma State	Alaska (1995–1997); Mobiline (1997–1999); Tanduay (2000–2001); Coca-Cola (2002–2003); Alaska (2004–2010)	none	10 (1995–1997, 1999–2001, 2003–2005)	
June Mar Fajardo	UC	Petron/San Miguel (2012–present)	8 (2014–2019, 2023, 2024)	9 (2013–2019, 2023, 2024)	
Bong Hawkins	Perpetual	Presto (1991–1992); Sta. Lucia (1993); Alaska (1993–2000); Tanduay (2001); Coca-Cola (2003–2005); Alaska (2005–2006)	none	3 (1994–1996)	
Abe King	San Beda	Toyota (1977–1983); Gold Eagle (1984); Great Taste (1985–1992); Purefoods (1993–1994)	none	n/a	
Danny Seigle	Wagner	San Miguel/Magnolia (1999–2011); Air21/Barako Bull (2011–2013); TNT (2013–2017)	none	8 (1999–2001, 2004–2007, 2011)	
Scottie Thompson	Perpetual	Barangay Ginebra (2015–present)	1 (2021)	6 (2016–2019, 2023, 2024)	
Arnie Tuadles	UV	Toyota (1977–1983); Great Taste (1984); Ginebra (1985); Alaska (1986); Great Taste (1987–1988); Shell (1989–1990); Presto (1990–1992)	none	n/a	
Manny Victorino	JRU	Great Taste (1981–1986); Shell (1987–1988); Presto (1989–1990); Pepsi/7-Up (1991–1992); Ginebra (1993); Purefoods (1994); Sunkist (1996)	none	5	
Elpidio Villamin	FEU	Crispa (1981–1984); Manila Beer (1985–1986); Alaska (1987–1990); Sunkist (1991–1995); Pepsi (1996–1997); San Miguel (1998)	none	3 (1989–1991)	

== Criticism ==
The additional 15 players that were added in 2015 caused criticism because some were still young and active (Williams - 33, Pingris - 34) and still at the peak of their career. Though the selection is valid, some from the 25 original greatest players questioned why some of the retired PBA legends were not included in the list like Nelson Asaytono, Danny Seigle, Abe King, Yoyoy Villamin, Olsen Racela, and Jeffrey Cariaso. Many have said that such players like Kerby Raymundo, Marlou Aquino, and Marc Pingris should have not been included on the list.

There were also controversial picks such as Chito Loyzaga who played for popular teams like Ginebra San Miguel and were selected over some of the aforementioned players. This is despite the fact that Loyzaga was only a one time member of the Mythical Second Team and played a supporting role to stars such as Robert Jaworski during his tenure with the team. Even Loyzaga himself quoted that he was being pranked when he heard the news of his selection.

When selecting the next ten players in 2025, Marcial suggested the panel to review any potential nominees in batches by year in order to avoid similar criticism to the 2015 selections.

== Grand Slam coaches ==
Before handing out the awards to the original 25 Greatest Players, the four head coaches that accomplished the elusive Grand Slam up to the 2000 season were also recognized.

^	Denotes coach who is still active
*	Elected to the PBA Hall of Fame
*^	Active coach who has been elected to the PBA Hall of Fame
HOF year	Denotes year of PBA Hall of Fame induction

Name	Team	Grandslam year	HOF year
Baby Dalupan*	Crispa Redmanizers	1976	2005
Tommy Manotoc*	Crispa Redmanizers	1983	2011
Norman Black*^	San Miguel Beermen	1989	2007
Tim Cone^	Alaska Milkmen	1996	

== See also ==
- Philippine Basketball Association Most Valuable Player award
- Philippine Basketball Association Best Player of the Conference Award
- PBA Hall of Fame
