= Ato Agustin =

Filipino basketball player, politician, and coach

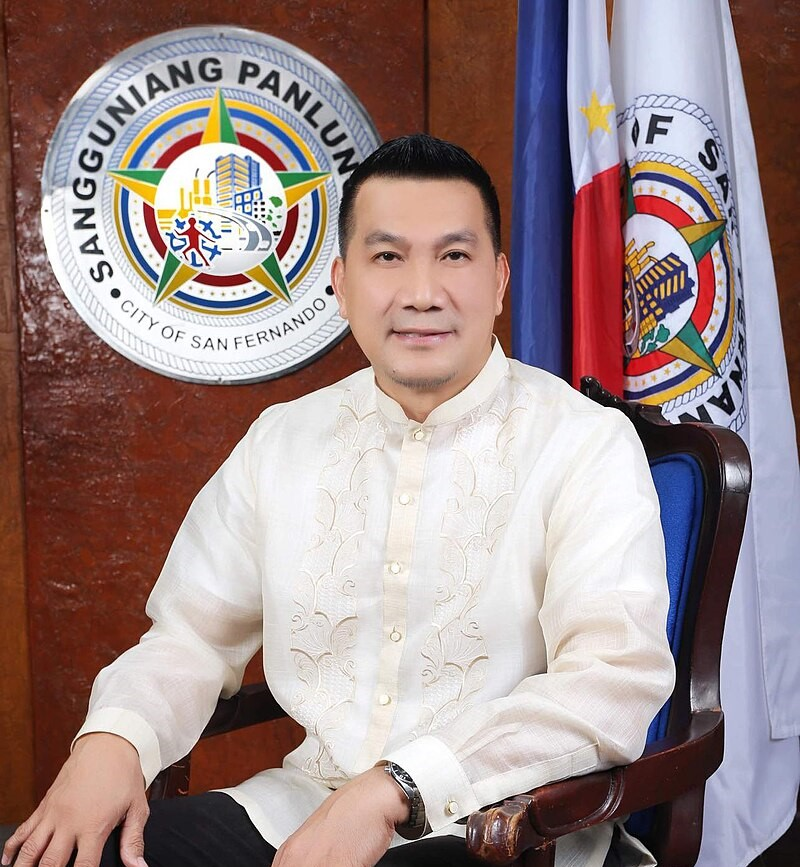
- Official portrait, 2022

Member of the San Fernando City Council
- In office June 30, 2016 – June 30, 2025
- In office June 30, 2004 – June 30, 2013

Personal details
- Born: August 1, 1963 (age 63) Lubao, Pampanga, Philippines
- Party: Kambilan (2018–present)
- Other political affiliations: Liberal (2012–2018); Independent (2009–2012); Lakas (2007–2009); PMP (2004–2007)
- Occupation: Athlete, politician
- Basketball career

San Miguel Beermen
- Title: Assistant coach
- League: PBA

Personal information
- Listed height: 5 ft 11 in (1.80 m)
- Listed weight: 180 lb (82 kg)

Career information
- College: UA-P; Lyceum
- PBA draft: 1989: 2nd round, 11th overall pick
- Drafted by: San Miguel Beermen
- Playing career: 1989–2001
- Position: Point guard / shooting guard
- Coaching career: 2009–present

Career history

Playing
- 1989–1996: San Miguel Beermen
- 1996–1997: Pop Cola Panthers
- 1997: Mobiline Phone Pals
- 1998: Pampanga Dragons
- 1999: Sta. Lucia Realtors
- 2000–2001: Batang Red Bull Energizers

Coaching
- 2009–2010: San Sebastian
- 2010–2012: Petron Blaze Boosters
- 2013–2014: Barangay Ginebra San Miguel
- 2014–2015: Barangay Ginebra San Miguel (assistant)
- 2015: Barangay Ginebra San Miguel
- 2015–present: San Miguel Beermen (assistant)

Career highlights
- As player: 7× PBA champion (1989 Open, 1989 All-Filipino, 1989 Reinforced, 1992 All-Filipino, 1993 Governors', 1994 All-Filipino, 2001 Commissioner's); PBA Most Valuable Player (1992); PBA Most Improved Player (1991); PBA Comeback Player of the Year (2000); 3× PBA Mythical First Team (1992–1994); PBA Mythical Second Team (1991); 6× PBA All-Star (1991, 1992, 1993, 1994, 1995, 1996); 50 Greatest Players in PBA History (2000 selection); PBA Grand Slam champion (1989); MBA champion (1998); MBA Finals Most Valuable Player (1998); MBA Mythical First Team (1998); As coach: NCAA Philippines champion (2009); PBA champion (2011 Governors'); As assistant coach: 11× PBA champion (2015 Governors', 2015–16 Philippine, 2016–17 Philippine, 2017–18 Commissioner's, 2017–18 Philippine, 2019 Philippine, 2019 Commissioner's, 2022 Philippine, 2023–24 Commissioner's, 2025 Philippine, 2025–26 Philippine)

Renato "Ato" Guilas Agustin (born August 1, 1963) is a Filipino former professional basketball player, politician, and current assistant coach for the San Miguel Beermen. He played college basketball for the Lyceum of the Philippines before moving on to play professional basketball in the Philippine Basketball Association (PBA).

Agustin was the Most Valuable Player awardee of the PBA in 1992. He played for the San Miguel Beermen, Sunkist/Pop Cola, Mobiline Phone Pals, Sta. Lucia Realtors, and finally, Batang Red Bull. Agustin was named a member of the PBA's 25 Greatest Players in 2000. He also had a brief stint in with the Pampanga Dragons in the Metropolitan Basketball Association.

== Basketball career ==
=== Professional career ===
A shooting guard since his amateur days with RFM-Swift Corporation of the Philippine Basketball League, Agustin saw limited minutes during his rookie season with the grandslam-winning San Miguel Beermen in 1989, playing backup to his more illustrious teammates Samboy Lim and Elmer Reyes. However, beginning the 1990 season, he became a regular part of the Beermen's backcourt rotation with the departure of Reyes to expansion team Pop-Cola (RFM) and constant injuries to Lim and Hector Calma.

Agustin won Most Improved Player in 1991 and Most Valuable Player the following year. He led the Beermen to three more titles in the early ‘90s, including All-Filipino championships in 1992 and 1994, this time as a starter and a star. His time with the Beermen ended when he was traded to the Pop Cola Panthers for Nelson Asaytono.

Agustin was picked by Yeng Guiao to play for the Batang Red Bull Energizers during the 2000 expansion draft. He helped them win the 2001 Commissioner's Cup. In Game 6 of the finals, he made two clutch free throws that sealed the championship. He retired from the PBA after that. For a time, he played semi-professional basketball as an import in Brunei.

=== National team career ===
Agustin represented the Philippine national basketball team at the 1994 Asian Games.

=== Coaching career ===
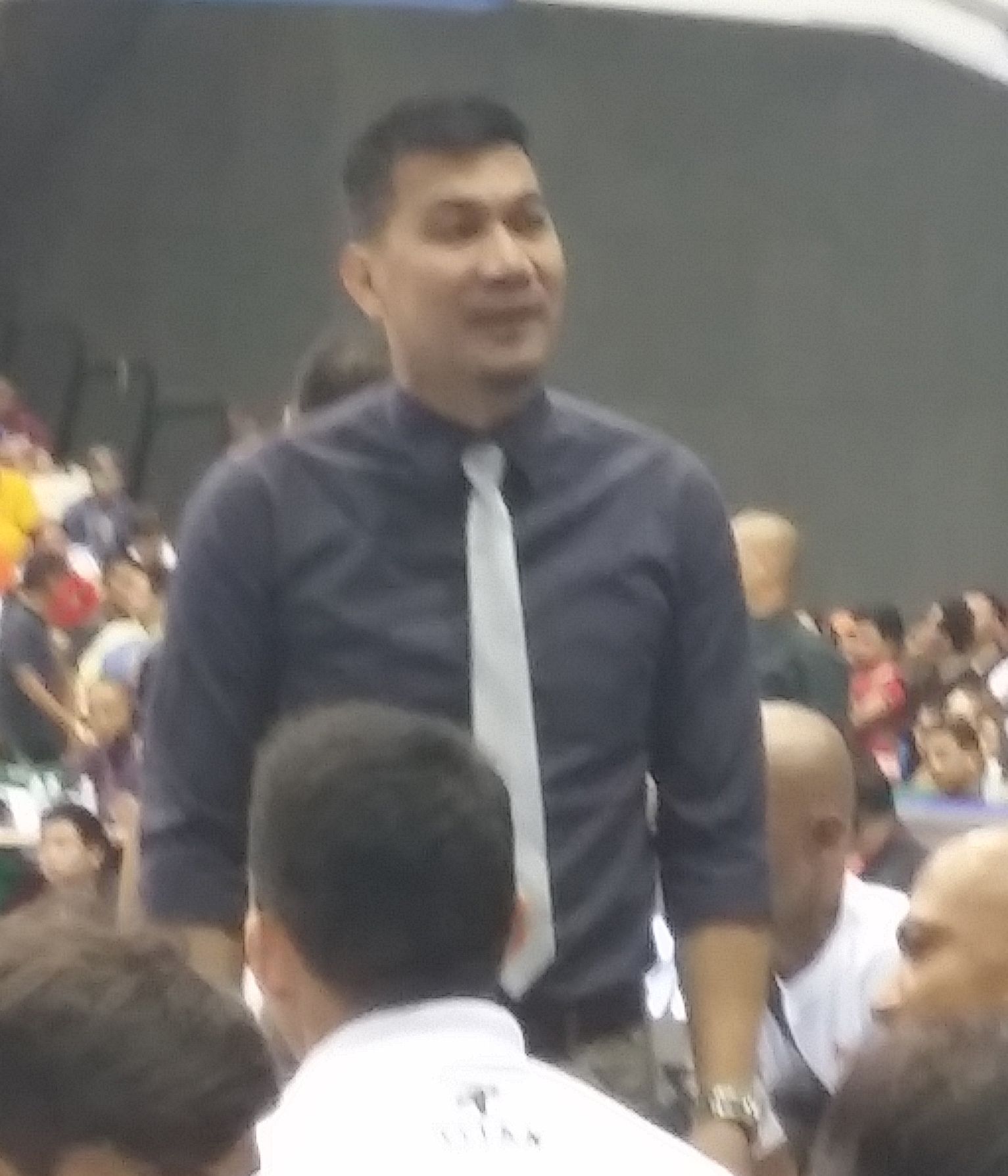
Agustin in 2014

He is the former head coach of the San Sebastian Golden Stags men's basketball team in the NCAA, having taken over from Jorge Gallent in 2009, and winning a championship in the same year. In 2010, he became head coach of his former PBA team, the San Miguel Beermen. During the 2011 PBA Governors' Cup, Agustin steered the team (then known as the Petron Blaze Boosters) to the championship, defeating the Talk 'N Text Tropang Texters in seven games. He became the 9th coach in PBA history to win a title in his first year as head coach.

On July 25, 2013, San Miguel Corporation, owner of Petron Blaze Boosters and Barangay Ginebra San Miguel, announced the appointment of Agustin as interim coach of Barangay Ginebra San Miguel for the 2013 PBA Governor's Cup.

On January 5, 2015, Barangay Ginebra team manager Alfrancis Chua announced during the team's practice the reappointment of Agustin as head coach of the team. This was after former coach Jeffrey Cariaso's attempt to end Ginebra's PBA championship drought failed after two conferences. After a quarterfinal finish in the Commissioner's Cup, Agustin was fired as the head coach of Ginebra and was replaced by assistant coach Frankie Lim. Following his termination, he returned to San Miguel Beermen as an assistant coach.

== Political career ==
Agustin was already a three-term councilor when he was defeated for vice mayor of San Fernando, Pampanga in 2013. However, he elected councilor of the same city in 2016, 2019 and 2022.

== PBA career statistics ==
Legend
GP	Games played	MPG	Minutes per game
FG%	Field-goal percentage	3P%	3-point field-goal percentage	FT%	Free-throw percentage
RPG	Rebounds per game	APG	Assists per game	SPG	Steals per game
BPG	Blocks per game	PPG	Points per game	**Bold**	Career high

=== Season-by-season averages ===
Year	Team	GP	MPG	FG%	3P%	FT%	RPG	APG	SPG	BPG	PPG
1989	San Miguel	39	13.2	.467	.000	.847	1.5	.6	.3	.0	7.4
1990	San Miguel	51	20.3	**.515**	.258	**.912**	1.7	1.1	.2	.1	11.3
1991	San Miguel	64	35.8	.492	.303	.821	4.0	2.8	.4	**.2**	19.2
1992	San Miguel	**74**	35.0	.500	.273	.893	**4.1**	3.4	.6	.1	**20.7**
1993	San Miguel	69	33.2	.490	.250	.879	3.8	**4.4**	.7	.1	16.2
1994	San Miguel	45	**39.5**	.482	.217	.881	4.5	4.1	**.8**	**.2**	20.3
1995	San Miguel	34	30.6	.450	**.367**	.838	2.9	3.6	.5	.1	14.2
1996	Sunkist	38	33.0	.456	.189	.859	3.6	3.4	.7	.0	15.5
1997	Pop Cola	30	21.3	.403	.250	.755	2.9	1.2	.4	.0	8.0
1997	Mobiline	30	21.3	.403	.250	.755	2.9	1.2	.4	.0	8.0
1999	Sta. Lucia	39	27.0	.354	.286	.847	2.8	1.7	.3	.0	7.4
2000	Red Bull	38	32.4	.369	.156	.874	3.1	2.1	.3	.1	11.7
2001	Red Bull	48	20.4	.369	.347	.833	2.4	1.2	.3	.0	5.9
Career		569	29.3	.463	.264	.864	3.2	2.6	.5	.1	14.0

== Coaching record ==
=== Collegiate record ===
Season	Team	Elimination round					Playoffs				
Season	Team	GP	W	L	PCT	Finish	GP	W	L	PCT	Results
2009	SSC-R	18	16	2	.889	2nd	5	3	2	.600	Champions
2010	SSC-R	16	13	3	.813	2nd	3	1	2	.333	FInals
Totals		34	29	5	.853		8	4	4	.500	1 championship

=== PBA ===
Season	Team	Conference	GP	W	L	PCT	Finish	PG	W	L	PCT	Results
2010–11	San Miguel /Petron	Philippine Cup	14	11	3	.786	2nd	13	7	6	.538	Finals
2010–11	San Miguel /Petron	Commissioner's Cup	9	2	7	.222	10th	—	—	—	—	Eliminated
2010–11	San Miguel /Petron	Governors' Cup	8	5	3	.625	2nd	12	7	5	.583	Champions
2011–12	Petron	Philippine Cup	14	9	5	.643	3rd	9	6	3	.667	Semifinals
2011–12	Petron	Commissioner's Cup	9	3	6	.333	9th	—	—	—	—	Eliminated
2011–12	Petron	Governors' Cup	9	5	4	.556	5th	5	1	4	.200 (6th)	Semifinals
2012–13	Ginebra	Governors' Cup	9	3	6	.333	8th	1	0	1	.000	Quarterfinals
2013–14	Ginebra	Philippine Cup	14	11	3	.876	1st	8	4	4	.500	Semifinals
2013–14	Ginebra	Commissioner's Cup	9	3	6	.333	8th	1	0	1	.000	Quarterfinals
2014–15	Ginebra	Commissioner's Cup	11	5	6	.455	8th	1	0	1	.000	Quarterfinals
Career total			106	57	49	.538	Playoff total	50	25	25	.500	1 PBA championship
