= Yves Dignadice =

Filipino basketball player

Personal information
- Born: December 18, 1964 (age 61) Iloilo City, Philippines
- Listed height: 6 ft 4 in (1.93 m)
- Listed weight: 178 lb (81 kg)

Career information
- High school: Iloilo Chinese Commercial High School (Iloilo City); West Negros College (Bacolod)
- College: De La Salle
- Playing career: 1983–2000
- Position: Power forward / center
- Number: 12

Career history
- 1984–1985: Northern Consolidated Cement
- 1986–1998: San Miguel Beermen
- 2000: Barangay Ginebra Kings

Career highlights
- 9× PBA champion; 3× PBA All-Star (1989, 1990, 1993); No. 12 retired by the San Miguel Beermen
Medals
Men's basketball
Representing Philippines
ABC Championship
Gold medal – first place	1985 Kuala Lumpur	Team
Asian Games
Silver medal – second place	1990 Beijing	Team
SEA Games
Gold medal – first place	1985 Bangkok	Team

Yves Arones Dignadice (born December 18, 1964) is a Filipino former professional basketball player who spent fourteen seasons in the Philippine Basketball Association, mostly with the San Miguel Beermen.

== Early life and career ==
Dignadice was born and raised in Jaro, Iloilo City. A pick-up from the Visayan cage recruit, he began playing in competitive basketball when he participated in a community tournament. After studying in a Chinese high school, he transferred to the West Negros College in Bacolod. Although he was still in high school, Yves already showed a skill that earned him a slot with the Western Visayas Regional Athletic Association selection (Region VI) that participated in the 1983 Palarong Pambansa held in Tacloban, Leyte.

When he played against the De La Salle team sponsored by Henry Cojuangco, he was then considered as a possible recruit for De La Salle. In May of that same year, Dignadice was transported to the mainland to take part in the first-ever PABL tournament as a Taft-based Green Archer. A month later, he joined the training camp of Ron Jacobs with the aspirations of making it with the RP squad to be sent to Hong Kong ABC. Unfortunately, Dignadice's ability was said to be still insufficient for a tournament according to coach Jacobs, and was cut from the final selection.

In early 1984, when the call for national team aspirants to the Asian Youth tournament was announced, Dignadice joined to improve his skills. He passed the requirements and underwent rigid preparations for the biennial competitions. Together with Negrense buddy and Naning Valenciano, they helped the RP squad to a third-place finish in Seoul, Korea. By that time, the Northern Consolidated contingent of Ron Jacobs was already showing a lot of skill in the PBA.

== Professional career ==
His long arms and quick feet gave him an advantage on defense, helping him earn three All-Star invites. Dignadice could guard all five positions and force his opponents to take awkward shots. He was included in the first ever national basketball team composed of PBA players in 1990 Asian Games, purportedly as coach Robert Jaworski's personal choice. He was also an integral part of the San Miguel franchise's Grand Slam run in 1989.

His stock fell off the grid as the 90s came because of various injuries. Unlike contemporary Jerry Codiñera, he never really had a firm grasp on the starting PF/C spot, and it didn't help him that he had the more illustrious Ramon Fernandez as his teammate and the team's main man. He was the last part of the Grand Slam squad to leave the Beermen when he was assigned to Ginebra a year before his eventual retirement.

After his retirement, he left the Philippines and is currently residing in the US.

== National team career ==
Dignadice was a member of two Philippine national teams: the first one was with the NCC-backed national team that won the gold medal during the 1985 ABC Championship (now FIBA Asia) in Kuala Lumpur, and second with the all-pro Philippine squad that won silver during the 1990 Asian Games in Beijing.

== Personal life ==
Dignadice has a daughter named Sophia who is a high school basketball player and a prospect for the Philippine women's national team.
