= Abet =

Abet may refer to:

- Aiding and abetting, a legal doctrine
- Abet Guidaben (born 1952), Filipino basketball player

== See also ==
- Abettor
- ABET
