= All-Defensive Team =

All-Defensive Team may refer to:

- NBA All-Defensive Team
- WNBA All-Defensive Team
- Philippine Basketball Association All-Defensive Team
