= 1998 PBA All-Star Weekend =

RP Centennial Team	PBA Selection
- Date: July 10–12, 1998
- Venue: Cebu Coliseum; Cuneta Astrodome, Cebu City; Pasay
- MVP: Vergel Meneses (Pop Cola)
- Network: Vintage Sports (IBC)

The 1998 PBA All-Star Weekend is the annual all-star weekend of the Philippine Basketball Association (PBA). Instead of the old formats of pitting its stars from the North against the South or the veterans versus the youngsters, the league this time featured the Philippine Centennial Team against a PBA Selection, reinforced by imports.

They played twice and the first All-Star Game was held outside of Manila since the annual spectacle was institutionalized in 1989.

== Skills Challenge Winners ==
- Two-Ball Contest: Allan Caidic and Freddie Abuda (San Miguel)
- Three-point Shootout: Jasper Ocampo (Pop Cola)
- Buzzer-Beater Contest: Tonyboy Espinosa (Mobiline)

== All-Star Game ==
=== PBA Selection ===
- Nelson Asaytono (San Miguel)
- Bonel Balingit (Pop Cola)
- Bal David (Ginebra)
- Jerry Codiñera (Purefoods)
- Rey Evangelista (Purefoods)
- Victor Pablo (Shell)
- Dindo Pumaren (Purefoods)
- Bong Ravena (Purefoods)
- Jason Webb (Sta.Lucia)
- John Best (Shell)*
- Devin Davis (Alaska)*
- Ronnie Coleman (Sta.Lucia)
- Roy Hairston (Purefoods)
- Coach: Derrick Pumaren (Sta.Lucia)

^{* Didn't play in the Manila game held at the Cuneta Astrodome.}

=== Philippine Centennial team ===
No.	Player	Position	PBA Team
4	Alvin Patrimonio	Forward	Purefoods
5	Andy Seigle	Center	Mobiline
6	Jojo Lastimosa	Guard	Alaska
7	Dennis Espino	Forward	Sta. Lucia
8	Allan Caidic	Guard	San Miguel
9	Jun Limpot	Forward	Sta. Lucia
10	Vergel Meneses	Forward	Pop Cola
11	Edward Joseph Feihl	Center	Purefoods
12	Olsen Racela	Guard	San Miguel
13	Marlou Aquino	Center	Ginebra
14	Johnny Abarrientos	Guard	Alaska
15	Kenneth Duremdes	Guard	Alaska

=== Game ===
Vintage

July 10

Philippine Centennial Team 114, PBA Selection 109

Cebu Coliseum, Cebu City

Vintage

July 12

Philippine Centennial Team 107, PBA Selection 92
Vergel Meneses was named the game's most valuable player, became the first player to win the award more than once.

Cuneta Astrodome, Pasay
