= 1991 PBA All-Star Game =

Dark Team All-Stars	Light Team All-Stars
120	127
- Date: May 26 - June 2, 1991
- Venue: The ULTRA, Pasig, Metro Manila
- Network: Vintage Sports (PTV)

The 1991 PBA All-Star Game is the annual All-Star Weekend of the Philippine Basketball Association (PBA). The All-Star game was held on May 26, 1991, at The ULTRA in Pasig, coinciding the league's 1991 season.

Two additional games were held from May 30 and June 2, with the two all-star teams competing with the Chinese national basketball team.

== PBA Legends game ==
=== Rosters ===
PBA Legends A - Light:

- Virgilio Abarrientos
- Cris Calilan
- Atoy Co
- Worley Cuevas
- Lucrecio Dator
- Gregorio Dionisio
- Francisco Henares
- Rolly Marcelo
- Yoyong Martirez
- Manny Paner
- David Regullano
- Johnny Revilla
- Jimmy Santos
- Rodolfo Soriano
- Rey Vallejo
- Wilfredo Velasco
- Coach: Narciso Bernardo

PBA Legends B - Dark:

- Orlando Bauzon
- Aurelio Clarino
- Orly delos Santos
- Valerio delos Santos
- Felix Flores
- Abet Gutierrez
- Jimmy Mariano
- Alfonso Mora
- Lawrence Mumar
- Jaime Noblezada
- Cristino Reynoso
- Rino Salazar
- Marte Samson
- Rodolfo Segura
- Arturo Valenzona
- Freddie Webb
- Coach: Loreto Carbonell

=== Game ===
Vintage Sports (PTV)

May 26
4:00 p.m.

PBA Legends A - Light 103, PBA Legends B - Dark 101
Scoring by quarter: 41–21, 13–28, 24–37, 25–15
Pts: Atoy Co 20	Pts: Lawrence Mumar 18

The ULTRA, Pasig, Metro Manila

== All-Star Game ==
=== Rosters ===
Light Team All-Stars:

- Nelson Asaytono (Purefoods)
- Jerry Codiñera (Purefoods)
- Alejandro de Guzman (Sarsi)
- Romeo dela Rosa (Shell)
- Jojo Lastimosa (Alaska)
- Joey Loyzaga (Sarsi)
- Ronnie Magsanoc (Shell)
- Benjie Paras (Shell)
- Alvin Patrimonio (Purefoods)
- Dindo Pumaren (Purefoods)
- Alfonso Solis (Sarsi)
- Elpidio Villamin (Sarsi)
- Bobby Parks*
- Coach: Yeng Guiao (Sarsi)

Dark Team All-Stars:

- Ato Agustin (San Miguel)
- Dondon Ampalayo (Ginebra)
- Allan Caidic (Presto)
- Rudy Distrito (Ginebra)
- Gerald Esplana (Presto)
- Ramon Fernandez (San Miguel)
- Dante Gonzalgo (Ginebra)
- Robert Jaworski (Ginebra)
- Chito Loyzaga (Ginebra)
- Zaldy Realubit (Presto)
- Alvin Teng (San Miguel)
- Manny Victorino (Pepsi)
- Norman Black*
- Coach: Robert Jaworski (Ginebra)

* played as import against the Chinese team.

=== Game ===
Vintage Sports (PTV)

May 26
6:20 p.m.

Light Team All-Stars 127, Dark Team All-Stars 120
Pts: Alvin Patrimonio 27	Pts: Ramon Fernandez 29
Alvin Patrimonio was named the game's most valuable player.

The ULTRA, Pasig, Metro Manila

== PBA-China national team series ==
Vintage Sports (PTV)

May 30
6:20 p.m.

Dark Team All-Stars 95, China 94

The ULTRA, Pasig, Metro Manila

Vintage Sports (PTV)

June 2
6:20 p.m.

Light Team All-Stars 104, China 94

The ULTRA, Pasig, Metro Manila
