= Paul Alvarez =

Filipino basketball player (born 1968)

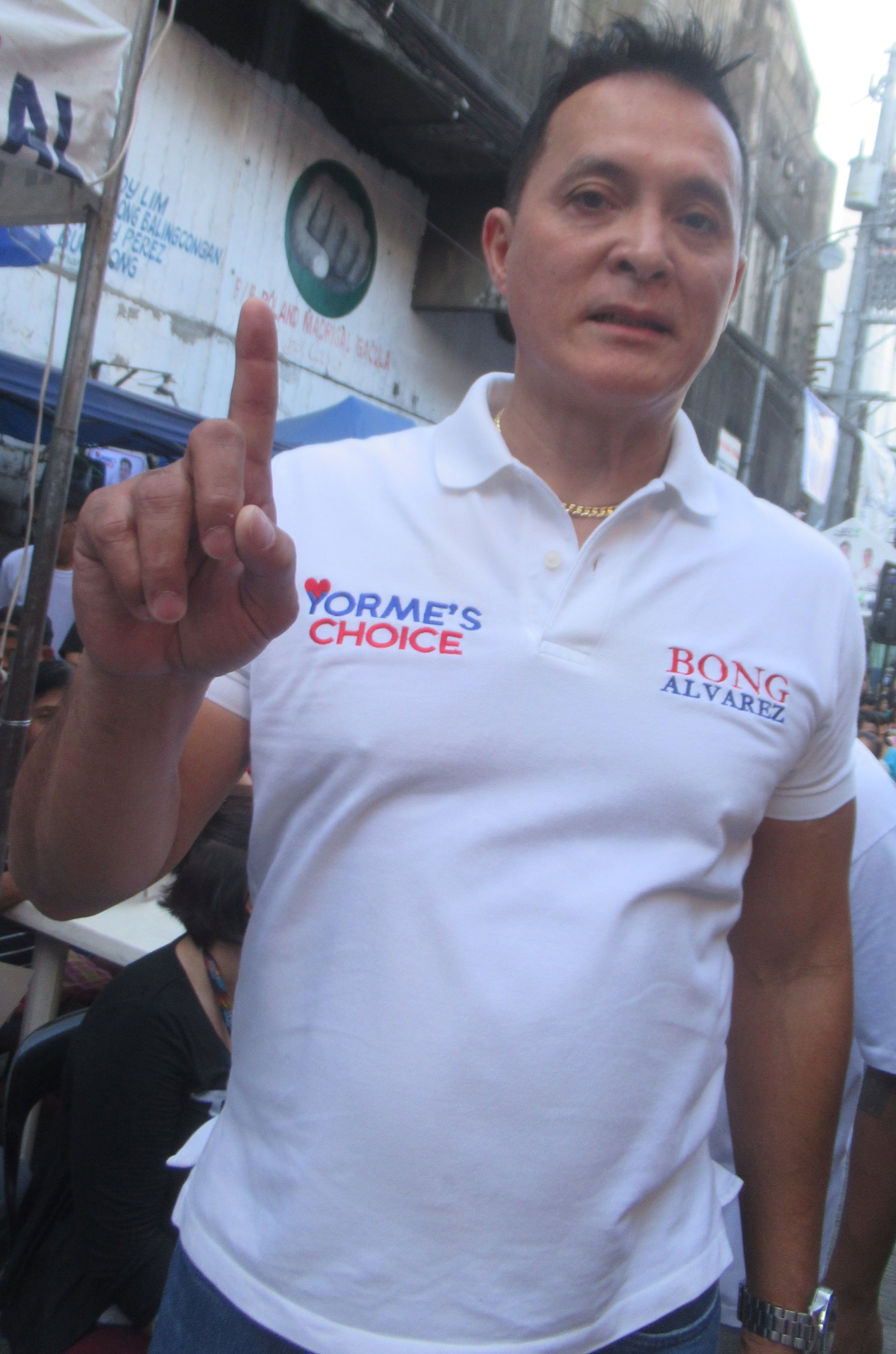
- Alvarez as a Manila councilor candidate in 2025
- Born: June 15, 1968 (age 58)
- Political party: Aksyon (2021–present)
- Basketball career

Personal information
- Listed height: 6 ft 0 in (1.83 m)
- Listed weight: 170 lb (77 kg)

Career information
- High school: UM (Manila)
- College: San Sebastian
- PBA draft: 1989: 1st round, 4th overall pick
- Drafted by: Alaska Milkmen
- Playing career: 1989–2005
- Position: Shooting guard / Small forward

Career history
- 1989–1992: Alaska Milkmen
- 1993: Sta. Lucia Realtors
- 1994–1995: Formula Shell
- 1995–1997: San Miguel Beermen
- 1998: Ginebra San Miguel
- 1999–2000: Pampanga Dragons
- 2000: Pasig-Rizal Pirates
- 2001: Socsargen Marlins
- 2002: FedEx Express
- 2002–2003: Talk 'N Text Phone Pals
- 2004–2005: Red Bull Barako

Career highlights
- PBA champion (1991 Third Conference); 2x PBA Comeback Player of the Year (1993, 1997); 2x PBA Mr. Quality Minutes (1997); 4x PBA All-Star (1989-1990, 1992, 1996); PBA Mythical 1st Team (1990); PBA Mythical 2nd Team (1989)
Medals
Men's basketball
Representing Philippines
SEA Games
| Gold medal – first place | 1987 Jakarta | Team |

Paul Beleno "Bong" Alvarez (born June 15, 1968) is a Filipino former professional basketball player of the Philippine Basketball Association and politician. Dubbed as "Mr. Excitement" because of his high-leaping, slam-dunking acts.

== Basketball career ==
At the young age of 17, Paul graduated from the University of Manila High School, where he was considered a star of the UM Hawklets. His playing style was noticed by San Sebastian coach Francis Rodriguez, who took him to the San Sebastian Varsity team in 1985. As a rookie, Alvarez helped the Recto-based team win their second championship in the NCAA.

In 1987, Paul was one of the college players chosen to represent the Philippine National team to the ABC Youth championships held in Manila. He then became a member of the RP Basketball team to the William Jones Cup in Taipei, the SEA games in Jakarta and ABC Championships in Bangkok. He also played for coach Derrick Pumaren and the Magnolia quintet in the Philippine Amateur Basketball League (PABL).

In his final year with San Sebastian College in 1988, Alvarez, along with league MVP Eugene Quilban, led the Stags to sweep the elimination round and then clinch the school's third NCAA title. The win erased the stigma of a bitter finals loss to Letran Knights the previous season.

== PBA career ==
Paul Alvarez turned pro in 1989 and was drafted third overall by Alaska Milk, behind fellow national teammates Benjie Paras and Nelson Asaytono. He made an impact from his very first game delighting the crowd with his high-flying antics. Soon after, fans and TV announcers started calling him "Mr.Excitement", a moniker that stuck with him throughout his career.

In his sophomore year, Alvarez shattered the record for most points by an individual in a single-game held by Allan Caidic. He poured in 71 points in Alaska's 169-138 victory over Formula Shell on April 26, 1990. That same year, he made it to the Mythical five selection for the first time but injured his Achilles heel in Game 3 of the 1990 PBA Third Conference Finals against Purefoods. He was out of commission for two full conferences to recuperate from the Achilles heel injury but made a successful comeback in the third conference. Helping to limit the point production of Best Import Awardee Wes Matthews in the finals against Ginebra San Miguel, Alvarez and the Milkmen won their first-ever PBA championship.

A contract dispute with Alaska at the start of the 1993 PBA season led to Alvarez boarding a plane to the United States. When he returned to the country, Alaska traded him to Sta.Lucia for Bong Hawkins. He was back in harness quickly becoming one of the main men of the Realtors and was named comeback player of the year by the PBA Press Corps.

His playing career become somewhat of a journeyman from there, being traded to Shell for Romeo Dela Rosa at the start of the 1994 PBA season and then moved to San Miguel Beer in a trade with Victor Pablo in less than two years. After his one-year stint with Ginebra in 1998, Alvarez went on to play for a short stint in the Metropolitan Basketball Association before coming back to play in the PBA.

== PBA career statistics ==
Legend
| GP | Games played | MPG | Minutes per game |
| FG% | Field-goal percentage | 3P% | 3-point field-goal percentage | FT% | Free-throw percentage |
| RPG | Rebounds per game | APG | Assists per game | SPG | Steals per game |
| BPG | Blocks per game | PPG | Points per game | **Bold** | Career high |

=== Season-by-season averages ===
| Year | Team | GP | MPG | FG% | 3P% | FT% | RPG | APG | SPG | BPG | PPG |
|---|---|---|---|---|---|---|---|---|---|---|---|
| 1989 | Alaska | **59** | 31.7 | .533 | .217 | .775 | **8.1** | 2.8 | 0.9 | 0.8 | 23.0 |
| 1990 | Alaska | 55 | 41.7 | .547 | .176 | .743 | 5.7 | 2.4 | 1.0 | **1.1** | **23.4** |
| 1991 | Alaska | 14 | 27.6 | .482 | .286 | .695 | 4.2 | 1.1 | 1.1 | 0.2 | 14.5 |
| 1992 | Alaska | 30 | **42.2** | .509 | .188 | .699 | 5.8 | 4.4 | **1.5** | 1.0 | 21.3 |
| 1993 | Sta Lucia | 19 | 40.0 | .538 | .333 | .674 | 7.8 | 4.8 | 1.2 | 0.8 | 20.4 |
| 1994 | Shell | 23 | 36.1 | .549 | .167 | .650 | 6.3 | 3.9 | 1.4 | 0.5 | 16.8 |
| 1995 | Shell | 32 | 34.2 | .545 | .353 | **.781** | 4.6 | 5.4 | 1.3 | 0.6 | 15.8 |
| 1995 | San Miguel | 17 | 24.2 | .563 | .000 | .565 | 3.3 | **5.7** | 0.8 | 0.8 | 11.5 |
| 1996 | San Miguel | 43 | 27.3 | .553 | .333 | .716 | 4.0 | 3.7 | 1.1 | 0.7 | 14.8 |
| Career | | 652 | 31.0 | .468 | .203 | .676 | 6.4 | 2.4 | 0.6 | 0.7 | 17.94 |

== Politics ==
In September 2024, Alvarez joined the Aksyon Demokratiko party as he would run for councilor of third district of Manila in the 2025 elections. He was named part of the ticket of former Manila Mayor Isko Moreno, who will seek a comeback as mayor. However, he lost, finishing 9th among the candidates for the six seats of the district.

== Arrest ==
Alvarez was caught using drugs with two other individuals at a barbershop in Sikatuna Village, Quezon City on June 3, 2017. Initially, policemen went to the barbershop to serve an arrest warrant on Alvarez for a case of slight physical injury.

== Filmography ==
| Year | Title | Role | Note(s) | Ref(s). |
|---|---|---|---|---|
| 1989 | Last Two Minutes | | | |
| 1994 | Mars Ravelo's Darna! Ang Pagbabalik | Magnum | | |
| 1994 | Megamol | Brando A. Cortez | | |
