= 1997 PBA All-Star Weekend =

Rookies-Sophomores-Juniors	Veterans
126	123
- Date: July 25–27, 1997
- Venue: Cuneta Astrodome, Pasay
- MVP: Bal David (Gordon's Gin)
- Network: Vintage Sports (IBC)

The 1997 PBA All-Star Weekend is the annual all-star weekend of the Philippine Basketball Association (PBA). The All-Star Fans Day was held on July 25 at the Araneta Coliseum in Quezon City while the All-Star Game was held on July 27 at the Cuneta Astrodome in Pasay.

== Skills Challenge Winners ==
- Buzzer-Beater Contest: Tonyboy Espinosa (Mobiline)
- Three-point Shootout: Roehl Gomez (Alaska)
- Slam Dunk Team Competition: Tyrone Hopkins and Mike Orquillas (Gordon's Gin)

== All-Star Game ==
=== Rosters ===
Rookies-Sophomores-Juniors:

- Marlou Aquino (Gordon's Gin)
- Nic Belasco (Pop Cola)
- Jeffrey Cariaso (Mobiline)
- Bal David (Gordon's Gin)
- Kenneth Duremdes (Pop Cola)
- Dennis Espino (Sta. Lucia)
- Chris Jackson (Sta.Lucia)
- Elmer Lago (Purefoods)
- Jojo Lim (Shell)
- Mike Mustre (San Miguel)
- Andy Seigle (Mobiline)
- Jason Webb (Sta.Lucia)
- Coach: Norman Black (San Miguel)

Veterans:

- Johnny Abarrientos (Alaska)
- Nelson Asaytono (San Miguel)
- Bonel Balingit (Pop Cola)
- Cris Bolado (Purefoods)
- Jerry Codiñera (Purefoods)
- Rey Evangelista (Purefoods)
- Vince Hizon (Gordon's Gin)
- Noli Locsin (Gordon's Gin)
- Vergel Meneses (Pop Cola)
- Alvin Patrimonio (Purefoods)
- Dindo Pumaren (Purefoods)
- Bong Ravena (Purefoods)
- Coach: Robert Jaworski (Ginebra)

=== Game ===
Vintage

July 27

Rookies-Sophomores-Juniors 126, Veterans 123
Bal David was named the game's most valuable player.

Cuneta Astrodome, Pasay
