= PBA All-Defensive Team =

The Philippine Basketball Association (PBA) All-Defensive Team is an honor given annually to the five players which exhibited outstanding defensive capabilities.

Starting from the 2021 PBA season, each All-Defensive Team consists of two backcourt (guards) and three frontcourt (forwards or centers or both) players. Previously, each All-Defensive Team would have two guards, two forwards, and a center.

== Selections ==
^	Denotes players who are still active in the PBA
*	Denotes players inducted to the PBA Hall of Fame
Player (X)	Denotes the number of times the player has been selected
**Player** **(in bold text)**	Indicates the player who won the Defensive Player of the Year award in the same year (Note: The Defensive Player of the Year award was first established in 1993.)

Season	Position	Players	Teams	Ref.
1985	Guard	Robert Jaworski*	Ginebra San Miguel	
1985	Guard	Chito Loyzaga	Ginebra San Miguel	
1985	Center	Elpidio Villamin	Manila Beer Brewmasters	
1985	Forward	Abe King	Great Taste Coffee Makers	
1985	Forward	Philip Cezar*	Shell Azodrin Bugbusters	
1986	Guard	Chito Loyzaga (2)	Ginebra San Miguel	
1986	Guard	Padim Israel	Tanduay Rhum Makers	
1986	Center	Elpidio Villamin (2)	Manila Beer Brewmasters	
1986	Forward	Ricky Relosa	Alaska Milkmen	
1986	Forward	Philip Cezar* (2)	Formula Shell Spark Aiders	
1987	Guard	Biboy Ravanes	Shell Azocord Super Bugbusters	
1987	Guard	Chito Loyzaga (3)	Ginebra San Miguel	
1987	Center	Elpidio Villamin (3)	Hills Bros. Coffee Kings	
1987	Forward	Ricky Relosa (2)	Hills Bros. Coffee Kings	
1987	Forward	Philip Cezar* (3)	Great Taste Instant Milk	
1988	Guard	Biboy Ravanes (2)	Alaska Milkmen	
1988	Guard	Chito Loyzaga (4)	Añejo Rum 65ers	
1988	Center	Elpidio Villamin (4)	Alaska Milkmen	
1988	Forward	Ricky Relosa (3)	Alaska Milkmen	
1988	Forward	Philip Cezar* (4)	Presto Ice Cream Makers	
1989	Guard	Glenn Capacio	Purefoods Hotdogs	
1989	Guard	Chito Loyzaga (5)	Añejo Rum 65ers	
1989	Center	Jerry Codiñera	Purefoods Hotdogs	
1989	Forward	Alvin Teng	San Miguel Beermen	
1989	Forward	Elpidio Villamin (5)	Alaska Milkmen	
1990	Guard	Glenn Capacio (2)	Purefoods Hotdogs	
1990	Guard	Alvin Teng (2)	San Miguel Beermen	
1990	Center	Jerry Codiñera (2)	Purefoods Hotdogs	
1990	Forward	Chito Loyzaga (6)	Añejo Rum 65ers	
1990	Forward	Elpidio Villamin (6)	Alaska Air Force	
1991	Guard	Glenn Capacio (3)	Purefoods Tender Juicy Hotdogs	
1991	Guard	Biboy Ravanes (3)	Alaska Milkmen	
1991	Center	Jerry Codiñera (3)	Purefoods Tender Juicy Hotdogs	
1991	Forward	Chito Loyzaga (7)	Ginebra San Miguel	
1991	Forward	Alvin Teng (3)	San Miguel Beermen	
1992	Guard	Glenn Capacio (4)	Purefoods Tender Juicy Hotdogs	
1992	Guard	Art dela Cruz	San Miguel Beermen	
1992	Center	Jerry Codiñera (4)	Purefoods Tender Juicy Hotdogs	
1992	Forward	Chito Loyzaga (8)	Ginebra San Miguel	
1992	Forward	Alvin Teng (4)	San Miguel Beermen	
1993	Guard	Glenn Capacio (5)	Purefoods Tender Juicy Hotdogs	
1993	Guard	Art dela Cruz (2)	San Miguel Beermen	
1993	Center	Jerry Codiñera (5)	Purefoods Tender Juicy Hotdogs	
1993	Forward	Jun Limpot	Sta. Lucia Realtors	
1993	Forward	**Alvin Teng** (5)	San Miguel Beermen	
1994	Guard	Johnny Abarrientos	Alaska Milkmen	
1994	Guard	Glenn Capacio (6)	Purefoods Tender Juicy Hotdogs	
1994	Center	**Jerry Codiñera** (6)	Purefoods Tender Juicy Hotdogs	
1994	Forward	Bong Hawkins	Alaska Milkmen	
1994	Forward	Alvin Teng (6)	San Miguel Beermen	
1995	Guard	Glenn Capacio (7)	Purefoods Tender Juicy Hotdogs	
1995	Guard	**Art dela Cruz** (3)	San Miguel Beermen	
1995	Center	Jerry Codiñera (7)	Purefoods Tender Juicy Hotdogs	
1995	Forward	Chris Jackson	Sta. Lucia Realtors	
1995	Forward	Elpidio Villamin (7)	Sunkist Orange Juicers	
1996	Guard	Johnny Abarrientos (2)	Alaska Milkmen	
1996	Guard	Jeffrey Cariaso	Alaska Milkmen	
1996	Center	**Marlou Aquino**	Ginebra San Miguel	
1996	Forward	Chris Jackson (2)	Sta. Lucia Realtors	
1996	Forward	Jerry Codiñera (8)	Purefoods Tender Juicy Hotdogs	
1997	Guard	Johnny Abarrientos (3)	Alaska Milkmen	
1997	Guard	Jeffrey Cariaso (2)	Alaska Milkmen	
1997	Center	Marlou Aquino (2)	Gordon's Gin Boars	
1997	Forward	**Freddie Abuda**	San Miguel Beermen	
1997	Forward	Jerry Codiñera (9)	Purefoods Carne Norte Beefies	
1998	Guard	Patrick Fran	Mobiline Phone Pals	
1998	Guard	Glenn Capacio (8)	Mobiline Phone Pals	
1998	Center	Jerry Codiñera (10)	Purefoods Tender Juicy Hotdogs	
1998	Forward	Freddie Abuda (2)	San Miguel Beermen	
1998	Forward	**Chris Jackson** (3)	Formula Shell Super Unleaded	
1999	Guard	Johnny Abarrientos (4)	Alaska Milkmen	
1999	Guard	Dindo Pumaren	Purefoods Tender Juicy Hotdogs	
1999	Center	Eric Menk	Tanduay Rhum Masters	
1999	Forward	Freddie Abuda (3)	San Miguel Beermen	
1999	Forward	**Chris Jackson** (4)	Shell Velocity	
2000	Guard	Dindo Pumaren (2)	Purefoods Tender Juicy Hotdogs	
2000	Guard	Jeffrey Cariaso (3)	Tanduay Rhum Masters	
2000	Center	Chris Jackson (5)	Shell Turbo Chargers	
2000	Forward	Rey Evangelista	Purefoods Tender Juicy Hotdogs	
2000	Forward	**Freddie Abuda** (4)	San Miguel Beermen	
2001	Guard	Patrick Fran (2)	Talk 'N Text Phone Pals	
2001	Guard	Rey Evangelista (2)	Purefoods Tender Juicy Hotdogs	
2001	Center	Marlou Aquino (3)	Sta. Lucia Realtors	
2001	Forward	**Chris Jackson** (6)	Shell	
2001	Forward	Dennis Espino	Sta. Lucia Realtors	
2002	Guard	Jeffrey Cariaso (4)	Coca-Cola Tigers	
2002	Guard	Rey Evangelista (3)	Purefoods Tender Juicy Hotdogs	
2002	Center	**Davonn Harp**	Batang Red Bull Thunder	
2002	Forward	Rudy Hatfield	Coca-Cola Tigers	
2002	Forward	Chris Jackson (7)	Shell Velocity	
2003	Guard	Patrick Fran (3)	Talk 'N Text Phone Pals	
2003	Guard	Willie Miller	Red Bull Barako	
2003	Center	Asi Taulava	Talk 'N Text Phone Pals	
2003	Forward	**Rudy Hatfield** (2)	Coca-Cola Tigers	
2003	Forward	Marlou Aquino (4)	Sta. Lucia Realtors	
2004–05	Guard	Johnny Abarrientos (5)	Coca-Cola Tigers	
2004–05	Guard	Junthy Valenzuela	Red Bull Barako	
2004–05	Center	Enrico Villanueva	Red Bull Barako	
2004–05	Forward	Rich Alvarez	Shell Turbo Chargers	
2004–05	Forward	**Dennis Espino** (2)	Sta. Lucia Realtors	
2005–06	Guard	Topex Robinson	Red Bull Barako	
2005–06	Guard	Wynne Arboleda	Air21 Express	
2005–06	Center	Dorian Peña	San Miguel Beermen	
2005–06	Forward	**Marc Pingris**	Purefoods Chunkee Giants	
2005–06	Forward	Nic Belasco	Alaska Aces	
2006–07	Guard	**Wynne Arboleda** (2)	Air21 Express	
2006–07	Guard	Gary David	Air21 Express	
2006–07	Center	Harvey Carey	Talk 'N Text Tropang Texters	
2006–07	Forward	Nelbert Omolon	Sta. Lucia Realtors	
2006–07	Forward	Arwind Santos	Air21 Express	
2007–08	Guard	Wynne Arboleda (3)	Air21 Express	
2007–08	Guard	Ryan Reyes	Sta. Lucia Realtors	
2007–08	Center	Marc Pingris (2)	Magnolia Beverage Masters	
2007–08	Forward	**Arwind Santos** (2)	Air21 Express	
2007–08	Forward	Kelly Williams^	Sta. Lucia Realtors	
2008–09	Guard	**Wynne Arboleda** (4)	Burger King Whoppers	
2008–09	Guard	Ronald Tubid	Barangay Ginebra Kings	
2008–09	Center	Asi Taulava (2)	Coca-Cola Tigers	
2008–09	Forward	Arwind Santos (3)	Burger King Whoppers	
2008–09	Forward	Billy Mamaril	Barangay Ginebra Kings	
2009–10	Guard	Roger Yap	B-Meg Derby Ace Llamados	
2009–10	Guard	Ryan Reyes (2)	Talk 'N Text Tropang Texters	
2009–10	Center	Marc Pingris (3)	B-Meg Derby Ace Llamados	
2009–10	Forward	**Gabe Norwood**	Rain or Shine Elasto Painters	
2009–10	Forward	Arwind Santos (4)	San Miguel Beermen	
2010–11	Guard	Ryan Reyes (3)	Talk 'N Text Tropang Texters	
2010–11	Guard	John Wilson	Barangay Ginebra Kings	
2010–11	Center	Marc Pingris (4)	B-Meg Derby Ace Llamados	
2010–11	Forward	Willy Wilson	Barangay Ginebra Kings	
2010–11	Forward	**Arwind Santos** (5)	Petron Blaze Boosters	
2011–12	Guard	Ryan Reyes (4)	Talk 'N Text Tropang Texters	
2011–12	Guard	**Jireh Ibañes**	Rain or Shine Elasto Painters	
2011–12	Center	Doug Kramer	Barako Bull Energy Cola	
2011–12	Forward	Arwind Santos (6)	Petron Blaze Boosters	
2011–12	Forward	Marc Pingris (5)	B-Meg Llamados	
2012–13	Guard	Gabe Norwood (2)	Rain or Shine Elasto Painters	
2012–13	Guard	Marcio Lassiter^	Petron Blaze Boosters	
2012–13	Center	Sonny Thoss	Alaska Aces	
2012–13	Forward	Arwind Santos (7)	Petron Blaze Boosters	
2012–13	Forward	**Marc Pingris** (6)	San Mig Coffee Mixers	
2013–14	Guard	Mark Barroca^	San Mig Super Coffee Mixers	
2013–14	Guard	Jireh Ibañes (2)	Rain or Shine Elasto Painters	
2013–14	Center	June Mar Fajardo^	San Miguel Beermen	
2013–14	Forward	Gabe Norwood (3)	Rain or Shine Elasto Painters	
2013–14	Forward	**Marc Pingris** (7)	San Mig Super Coffee Mixers	
2014–15	Guard	Chris Ross^	San Miguel Beermen	
2014–15	Guard	Chris Exciminiano	Alaska Aces	
2014–15	Center	**June Mar Fajardo**^ (2)	San Miguel Beermen	
2014–15	Forward	Gabe Norwood (4)	Rain or Shine Elasto Painters	
2014–15	Forward	Calvin Abueva^	Alaska Aces	
2015–16	Guard	**Chris Ross**^ (2)	San Miguel Beermen	
2015–16	Guard	Chris Exciminiano (2)	Alaska Aces	
2015–16	Center	Japeth Aguilar^	Barangay Ginebra San Miguel	
2015–16	Forward	Gabe Norwood (5)	Rain or Shine Elasto Painters	
2015–16	Forward	Marc Pingris (8)	Star Hotshots	
2016–17	Guard	Jio Jalalon^	Star Hotshots	
2016–17	Guard	**Chris Ross**^ (3)	San Miguel Beermen	
2016–17	Center	June Mar Fajardo^ (3)	San Miguel Beermen	
2016–17	Forward	Gabe Norwood (6)	Rain or Shine Elasto Painters	
2016–17	Forward	Japeth Aguilar^ (2)	Barangay Ginebra San Miguel	
2017–18	Guard	Chris Ross^ (4)	San Miguel Beermen	
2017–18	Guard	Gabe Norwood (7)	Rain or Shine Elasto Painters	
2017–18	Center	June Mar Fajardo^ (4)	San Miguel Beermen	
2017–18	Forward	Rome dela Rosa^	Magnolia Hotshots Pambansang Manok	
2017–18	Forward	Rafi Reavis^	Magnolia Hotshots Pambansang Manok	
2019	Guard	Chris Ross^ (5)	San Miguel Beermen	
2019	Guard	CJ Perez^	Columbian Dyip	
2019	Center	June Mar Fajardo^ (5)	San Miguel Beermen	
2019	Forward	**Sean Anthony**	NorthPort Batang Pier	
2019	Forward	Japeth Aguilar^ (3)	Barangay Ginebra San Miguel	
2020 (Note: The 2020 season only had one conference. The team was renamed as "All-Bubble D-Fenders" for this season. The award was given by the PBA Press Corps.)	Guard	Mark Barroca^ (2)	Magnolia Hotshots Pambansang Manok	
2020	Guard	Chris Ross^ (6)	San Miguel Beermen	
2020	Center	**Justin Chua**^	Phoenix Super LPG Fuel Masters	
2020	Forward	Calvin Abueva^ (2)	Phoenix Super LPG Fuel Masters	
2020	Forward	Christian Standhardinger	NorthPort Batang Pier	
2021	Guard	Jio Jalalon^ (2)	Magnolia Pambansang Manok Hotshots	
2021	Guard	Chris Ross^ (7)	San Miguel Beermen	
2021	Center	Kelly Williams^ (2)	TNT Tropang Giga	
2021	Forward	**Arwind Santos** (8)	NorthPort Batang Pier	
2021	Forward	Cliff Hodge^	Meralco Bolts	
2022–23	Guard	**Jio Jalalon**^ (3)	Magnolia Chicken Timplados Hotshots	
2022–23	Guard	Chris Newsome^	Meralco Bolts	
2022–23	Center	June Mar Fajardo^ (6)	San Miguel Beermen	
2022–23	Forward	Cliff Hodge^ (2)	Meralco Bolts	
2022–23	Forward	Christian Standhardinger (2)	Barangay Ginebra San Miguel	
2023–24	Guard	Chris Newsome^ (2)	Meralco Bolts	
2023–24	Guard	Joshua Munzon^	NorthPort Batang Pier	
2023–24	Center	June Mar Fajardo^ (7)	San Miguel Beermen	
2023–24	Forward	**Cliff Hodge**^ (3)	Meralco Bolts	
2023–24	Forward	Kemark Cariño^	Terrafirma Dyip	
2024–25	Guard	Stephen Holt^	Barangay Ginebra San Miguel	
2024–25	Guard	Joshua Munzon^ (2)	NorthPort Batang Pier	
2024–25	Center	June Mar Fajardo^ (8)	San Miguel Beermen	
2024–25	Forward	Glenn Khobuntin^	TNT Tropang 5G	
2024–25	Forward	**Zavier Lucero**^	Magnolia Chicken Timplados Hotshots	

== Most selections ==
The following table only lists players with at least five total selections.

^	Denotes players who are still active

Player	Total	Defensive Player of the Year
Jerry Codiñera	10	1
Marc Pingris	8	3
Arwind Santos	8	3
June Mar Fajardo^	8	1
Glenn Capacio	8	0
Chito Loyzaga	8	0
Chris Jackson	7	3
Chris Ross^	7	2
Gabe Norwood	7	1
Alvin Teng	7	1
Elpidio Villamin	7	0
Johnny Abarrientos	5	0
