= Boy Cabahug =

Filipino basketball player and coach

Elmer "Boy" Cabahug
Personal information
- Born: June 1, 1964 (age 62) Cebu City, Philippines
- Listed height: 6 ft 0 in (1.83 m)
- Listed weight: 165 lb (75 kg)

Career information
- College: UV
- PBA draft: 1989:
- Drafted by: Alaska Air Force
- Playing career: 1989–1998
- Position: Shooting guard
- Number: 9

Career history
- 1989–1990: Alaska Milkmen
- 1991–1993: Purefoods Hotdogs
- 1994–1996: Pepsi Mega Hotshots
- 1997–1998: Sta. Lucia Realtors
- 1999: Pangasinan Waves

Career highlights
- 2× PBA champion (1991 All-Filipino, 1993 All-Filipino); 5× PBA All-Star (1989, 1990, 1992, 1993, 1994); PBA All-Star MVP (1989); PBA Mythical Second Team (1992)

Elmer "Boy" Valera Cabahug (born June 1, 1964, in Cebu City, Philippines) is a retired Filipino professional basketball player in the Philippine Basketball Association and the former head coach of the University of the Visayas Green Lancers varsity team.

== Amateur career ==
Boy is a third generation representative of the Cabahug clan in basketball, grandfather Atty. Cesar Cabahug was a member of the 1938 National collegiate champions University of Visayas while his father Eduardo Cabahug likewise played for the UV Lancers that were national collegiate champions in 1957.

As a high school at the St. Louis school, Boy had his stint as a junior player in the Cebu Catholic Schools Athletic Association (CSAA) during his first and second year in the secondary level. His biggest break was given to him by his University of Visayas coach Ining Completo. While playing for the Lancers, he won the MVP plum twice in 1981 and again in 1983 in the CAAA. His amateur stint includes being recruited to play for Mama's Love and later on with RFM-Swifts in the PABL, he briefly saw action for the national team before making it to the PBA.

== PBA career ==
He turned pro in 1989 and was picked by the Alaska Milkmen. In his rookie year, Boy was voted Most Valuable Player (MVP) of the PBA All-Star game. He was acquired by Purefoods in 1991 during the off-season trade with Jojo Lastimosa. In three seasons with the Hotdogs, Boy won two championships, but prior to the start of the 1993 PBA season, Cabahug wanted a better terms in his contract with Purefoods and was denied, he agreed instead to a one-year extension.

In 1994, Boy got his wish as Purefoods dealt him to Pepsi Mega and he signed a P9-million, three-year pact with the Mega Bottlers. Cabahug became Pepsi's main man and leading scorer during that season. He spent his final two years in the PBA with Sta. Lucia Realtors in 1997–98.
