= 2000 PBA expansion draft =

Overview
- League: Philippine Basketball Association
- Expansion teams: Batang Red Bull Energizers

The 2000 PBA expansion draft was the second expansion draft of the Philippine Basketball Association (PBA). The draft was held in December 1999, so that the newly founded team Batang Red Bull Energizers could acquire players for the 2000 PBA season.

== Key ==
| Pos. | G | F | C |
| Position | Guard | Forward | Center |

== Selections ==
| Player | Pos. | Nationality | Previous team | PBA years^{[a]} |
|---|---|---|---|---|
| Ato Agustin | G | Philippines | Sta. Lucia Realtors | 9 |
| Glenn Capacio | G/F | Philippines | Mobiline Phone Pals | 12 |
| Cris Bolado | C | Philippines | San Miguel Beermen | 6 |
| Edmund Reyes | F | Philippines | Purefoods TJ Hotdogs | 5 |
| Allan Caidic^{[b]} | G | Philippines | Barangay Ginebra Kings | 13 |

== Notes ==
- ^{a} Number of years played in the PBA prior to the draft
- ^{b} Caidic did not play for Red Bull and retired immediately after being selected in the expansion draft.
