= 1995 PBA draft =

Player selection in Philippine basketball

General information
- Date(s): January 8, 1995
- Location: New World Makati Hotel, Makati
- Network(s): Vintage Sports on PTV

Overview
- League: Philippine Basketball Association
- First selection: Dennis Espino (Sta.Lucia)

The 1995 Philippine Basketball Association (PBA) rookie draft was an event at which teams drafted players from the amateur ranks. The annual rookie draft was held on January 8 at the New World Hotel in Makati.

== Round 1 ==
Pick	Player	Country of origin*	PBA team	College
1	Dennis Espino	Philippines	Sta. Lucia Realtors	Santo Tomas
2	Edward Joseph Feihl	Philippines	Ginebra San Miguel	Adamson
3	Kenneth Duremdes	Philippines	Sunkist Orange Juicers	Adamson
4	Christopher Jackson	United States	Purefoods TJ Hotdogs	San Bernardino
5	Bryant Punsalan	Philippines	San Miguel Beermen	Far Eastern
6	Jeffrey Cariaso	United States	Alaska Milkmen	Sonoma State
7	Edmund Reyes	Philippines	Purefoods TJ Hotdogs	Santo Tomas
8	Giovanni Pineda	Philippines	Alaska Milkmen	Adamson

== Round 2 ==
Pick	Player	Country of origin*	PBA team	College
9	Adriano Papa, Jr. II	Philippines	Sta. Lucia Realtors	De La Salle
10	Robert Jaworski Jr.	Philippines	Ginebra San Miguel	Ateneo de Manila
11	Elmer Lago	Philippines	Shell Rimula X	De La Salle
	Mike Orquillas	Philippines	Purefoods TJ Hotdogs	Cebu Central
	Matthew Makalintal	Philippines	San Miguel Beermen	Saint Benilde
	Alejandro Lim	Philippines	Purefoods TJ Hotdogs	Visayas
	Jun Paguinto	Philippines	Sunkist Orange Juicers	Far Eastern

== Round 3 ==
Pick	Player	Country of origin*	PBA team	College
	Ferdinand Pastor	Philippines	Sta. Lucia Realtors	Cebu Doctors
	Lou Regidor	Philippines	Ginebra San Miguel	Cebu
	Carlito Espiritu	Philippines	Shell Rimula X	Letran
	Armoni Llagas	Philippines	Pepsi Mega	San Sebastian
	Silver Villafuerte	Philippines	San Miguel Beermen	
	Roderick Bughao	Philippines	Purefoods TJ Hotdogs	Visayas
	Bal David	Philippines	Sunkist Orange Juicers	Santo Tomas

== Round 4 ==
Pick	Player	Country of origin*	PBA team	College
	Jose Francisco	Philippines	Sta. Lucia Realtors	Far Eastern
	Eduardo Carvajal	Philippines	Shell Rimula X	
	Ponce Anthony Castelo	Philippines	Pepsi Mega	De La Salle
	Ruben Nieva	Philippines	Purefoods TJ Hotdogs	

== Round 5 ==
Pick	Player	Country of origin*	PBA team	College
	Ronald Pena	Philippines	Pepsi Mega	Letran
	Jose Ticzon	Philippines	Shell Rimula X	Ateneo de Manila
