= 1992 PBA All-Star Game =

South All-Stars	North All-Stars
108	105
	1	2	3	4	Total
South All-Stars	20	30	34	24	108
North All-Stars	18	34	32	21	105
- Date: May 24, 1992
- Venue: The ULTRA, Pasig, Metro Manila
- MVP: Alvin Teng (San Miguel)
- Attendance: 9633
- Network: Vintage Sports (PTV)

The 1992 PBA All-Star Game is the annual all-star weekend of the Philippine Basketball Association (PBA). The events were held on May 24, 1992, at The ULTRA in Pasig, coinciding the league's 1992 season.

This is also the first All-Star game that featured skills challenge.

== Skills challenge ==
=== Three-point shootout ===
Name	First round	Championship
Ronnie Magsanoc	18	7
Allan Caidic	16	10
Boy Cabahug	14	
Ato Agustin	12	
Roehl Gomez	12	
Naning Valenciano	11	
Ric-Ric Marata	11	
Pido Jarencio	11	

=== Slam Dunk competition ===
Name	First round	Second round	Championship
Vergel Meneses	27	26	30
Bong Ravena	25	30	27
Jerry Codiñera	24	23	
Mulong Orillosa	25	30	
Nelson Asaytono	27	15	

== All-Star Game ==
=== Rosters ===
North All-Stars:

- Samboy Lim (San Miguel)
- Ato Agustin (San Miguel)
- Paul Alvarez (Alaska)
- Vergel Meneses (Presto)
- Allan Caidic (Presto)
- Robert Jaworski (Ginebra)
- Chito Loyzaga (Ginebra)
- Ronnie Magsanoc (Shell)
- Benjie Paras (Shell)
- Alvin Patrimonio (Purefoods)
- Jerry Codiñera (Purefoods)
- Manny Victorino (Pepsi)
- Coach: Robert Jaworski (Ginebra)

South All-Stars:

- Dondon Ampalayo (Ginebra)
- Dante Gonzalgo (Ginebra)
- Pido Jarencio (Ginebra)
- Nelson Asaytono (Swift)
- Alfonso Solis (Swift)
- Boy Cabahug (Purefoods)
- Dindo Pumaren (Purefoods)
- Romeo dela Rosa (Shell)
- Abet Guidaben (Pepsi)
- Jojo Lastimosa (Alaska)
- Zaldy Realubit (Presto)
- Alvin Teng (San Miguel)
- Coach: Tim Cone (Alaska)

=== Game ===
Vintage

May 24
6:20 p.m.

South All-Stars 108, North All-Stars 105
Scoring by quarter: 20–18, 30–34, 34–32, 24–21
Pts: Alvin Teng 18	Pts: Allan Caidic 29
Alvin Teng was named the game's most valuable player.

The ULTRA, Pasig
Attendance: 9663
Referees: G. Ledesma, D. Bartolome, F. Ilagan
