= 1990 PBA All-Star Game =

Veterans	Rookies-Sophomores-Juniors
146	118
	1	2	3	4	Total
Veterans	29	26	40	51	146
Rookies-Sophomores-Juniors	24	25	33	36	118
- Date: June 3, 1990
- Venue: The ULTRA, Pasig, Metro Manila
- MVP: Samboy Lim
- Network: Vintage Sports (PTV)

The 1990 PBA All-Star Game is the second all-star weekend of the Philippine Basketball Association (PBA). The events were held on June 3, 1990, at The ULTRA in Pasig, coinciding the league's 1990 season.

== PBL North-South showdown ==
=== Rosters ===
North:

- Johnny Abarrientos (Crispa 400)
- Johnedel Cardel (Magnolia Ice Cream)
- Art dela Cruz (Sta. Lucia Realtors)
- Jayvee Gayoso (Philips Sardines)
- Joey Guanio (Philips Sardines)
- Bong Hawkins (Crispa 400)
- Vergel Meneses (Burger City Masters)
- Victor Pablo (Crispa 400)
- Silverio Palad (Philips Sardines)
- Eugene Quilban (Sta. Lucia Realtors)
- Eric Reyes (Sarsi Bottlers)
- Ferdinand Santos (Sarsi Bottlers)
- Coach: Francis Rodriguez (Sta. Lucia Realtors)

South:

- Bonel Balingit (Magnolia Ice Cream)
- Noli Banate (Agfa XRG)
- Emil Chuatico (Magnolia Ice Cream)
- Felix Duhig (Crispa 400)
- Jun Jabar (Crispa 400)
- Jun Limpot (Magnolia Ice Cream)
- Edgar Macaraya (Sta. Lucia Realtors)
- Tata Marata (Philips Sardines)
- Peter Naron (Burger City Masters)
- Bong Ravena (Burger City Masters)
- Allen Sasan (Burger City Masters)
- Mark Anthony Tallo (Magnolia Ice Cream)
- Coach: Derrick Pumaren (Magnolia Ice Cream)

=== Game ===
Vintage Sports (PTV)

June 3
4:00 p.m.

PBL North 107, PBL South 102
Scoring by quarter: 29–21, 22–19, 22–26, 34–36'
Pts: Victor Pablo 16	Pts: Jun Limpot 29

The ULTRA, Pasig, Metro Manila

== All-Star Game ==
=== Rosters ===
Rookies-Sophomores-Juniors:

- Paul Alvarez (Alaska)
- Nelson Asaytono (Purefoods)
- Boy Cabahug (Alaska)
- Jerry Codiñera (Purefoods)
- Peter Jao (Presto)
- Gerald Esplana (Presto)
- Jojo Lastimosa (Purefoods)
- Ronnie Magsanoc (Shell)
- Ric-Ric Marata (Alaska)
- Benjie Paras (Shell)
- Alvin Patrimonio (Purefoods)
- Dindo Pumaren (Purefoods)
- Coach: Jimmy Mariano (Presto)

Veterans:

- Allan Caidic (Presto)
- Hector Calma (San Miguel)
- Philip Cezar (Añejo)
- Rey Cuenco (Añejo)
- Yves Dignadice (San Miguel)
- Ramon Fernandez (San Miguel)
- Dante Gonzalgo (Añejo)
- Robert Jaworski (Añejo)
- Samboy Lim (San Miguel)
- Chito Loyzaga (Añejo)
- Manny Victorino (Presto)
- Elpidio Villamin (Alaska)
- Coach: Robert Jaworski (Añejo)

=== Game ===
Vintage Sports (PTV)

June 3
6:20 p.m.

Veterans 146, Rookies-Sophomores-Juniors 118
Scoring by quarter: 29–24, 26–25, 40–33, 51–36
Pts: Samboy Lim 42	Pts: Ronnie Magsanoc 25
Samboy Lim was named the game's most valuable player.

The ULTRA, Pasig, Metro Manila
