= Abet Guidaben =

Filipino basketball player

Personal information
- Born: September 14, 1952 (age 74) Mambajao, Camiguin, Philippines
- Listed height: 6 ft 5 in (1.96 m)
- Listed weight: 192 lb (87 kg)

Career information
- College: USJ–R
- Playing career: 1975–1995
- Position: Center / power forward
- Number: 5, 32, 55, 41

Career history
- 1973–1984: Crispa Redmanizers
- 1985: Tanduay Rhum Makers
- 1986: Manila Beer Brewmasters
- 1987–1988: San Miguel Beermen
- 1988: Purefoods Hotdogs
- 1989: Alaska Air Force
- 1990–1993: Pepsi Hotshots/7-Up Uncolas
- 1994–1995: Shell Rimula X

Career highlights
- 16× PBA champion (1975 All-Philippine, 1976 First, 1976 Second, 1976 All-Philippine, 1977 All-Filipino, 1977 Open, 1979 All-Filipino, 1980 All-Filipino, 1981 Reinforced Filipino, 1983 All-Filipino, 1983 Reinforced Filipino, 1983 Open, 1984 First All-Filipino, 1987 Reinforced, 1988 Open, 1988 Reinforced); 2× PBA Most Valuable Player (1983, 1987); 5× PBA Mythical First Team (1983-1985, 1987-1988); 3× PBA All-Star (1992, 1993, 1994); 50 Greatest Players in PBA History (2000 selection); PBA Hall of Fame Class of 2007
Medals
Men's basketball
Representing Philippines
ABC Championship
Gold medal – first place	1973 Manila	Team

Alberto "Abet" Guidaben (born September 14, 1952) is a Filipino former professional basketball player in the PBA. He was part of the fabled Crispa Redmanizers ballclub that won two Grand Slams, in 1976 and 1983. He was a two-time PBA Most Valuable Player awardee in 1983 and 1987.

== Collegiate and amateur career ==
Guidaben started his career with the Agoho (Mambajao, Camiguin) Pirates and the University of San Jose - Recoletos. Then in 1973, he became part of the Crispa team in the old Manila Industrial and Commercial Athletic Association (MICAA). The Crispa-Floro duo was again in the national team skippered by Jaworski for the 1974 Asian Games in Teheran.

== Professional career ==
In the PBA, Guidaben was a "late-bloomer" with Crispa. During the league's early years, he played in the shadows of teammates like Philip Cezar, Atoy Co, and Bogs Adornado. But slowly, his talent as a big man emerged and he became one of Crispa's greatest assets. He was already a good rebounder but later developed a strong inside game complemented with accurate off-the-glass jumpers from the perimeter. He was also one of the earliest dunkers in the PBA making the slam dunk vogue in the league a decade before the arrival of highflyers like Samboy Lim, Paul "Bong" Alvarez, Vergel Meneses and Nelson Asaytono. He also had a rivalry with Toyota's Fernandez which was considered a classic in itself. He won MVP honors in 1983 while with Crispa and 1987 while with San Miguel Beer.

== PBA career statistics ==
Legend
GP	Games played	MPG	Minutes per game
FG%	Field-goal percentage	3P%	3-point field-goal percentage	FT%	Free-throw percentage
RPG	Rebounds per game	APG	Assists per game	SPG	Steals per game
BPG	Blocks per game	PPG	Points per game	**Bold**	Career high

Year	Team	GP	MPG	FG%	3P%	FT%	RPG	APG	SPG	BPG	PPG
1975	Crispa	44	15.55	.516	.000	.682	5.23	0.59	0.16	0.55	6.6
1976	Crispa	51	17.59	.507	.000	.712	6.02	0.47	0.24	0.47	8.9
1977	Crispa	63	20.92	.518	.000	.717	5.84	1.24	0.27	0.78	11.8
1978	Crispa	45	22.22	.538	.000	.678	6.93	1.24	0.18	1.21	13.4
1979	Crispa	61	23.49	.572	.000	.791	7.33	1.21	0.16	1.21	12.2
1980	Crispa	59	23.61	.518	.333	.784	8.29	1.69	0.29	0.80	14.8
1981	Crispa	52	23.23	.469	.000	.796	7.04	1.60	0.33	0.71	13.8
1982	Crispa	54	28.81	.582	.000	.724	9.13	2.17	0.22	0.83	16.5
1983	Crispa	59	31.08	**.592**	.500	.759	8.69	3.49	0.25	0.88	17.9
1984	Crispa	61	34.03	.584	.286	.768	**11.38**	3.33	0.51	1.72	**21.0**
1985	Tanduay	50	39.40	.552	.263	.742	11.18	**4.46**	0.50	1.44	22.8
1985	Manila Beer	17	28.29	.523	.000	.843	6.35	2.12	0.82	0.71	14.3
1985	2 Teams (Combined)	67	33.85	.546	..227	.759	9.96	3.87	0.58	1.25	20.66
1986	Manila Beer	38	35.53	.493	**.364**	.767	9.84	2.68	0.55	0.87	15.1
1987	Magnolia/San Miguel	64	**35.97**	.496	.143	.822	10.70	2.94	0.14	0.77	19.3
1988	San Miguel Beer	47	34.66	.505	.167	.822	11.49	3.32	0.30	0.70	19.9
1988	Purefoods	10	28.10	.491	.000	.818	6.60	2.80	0.30	0.30	13.5
1988	2 Teams (Combined)	57	31.38	.504	.143	.746	10.63	3.23	0.30	0.63	18.81
1989	Alaska	29	29.38	.499	.400	**.876**	9.76	2.28	0.34	1.00	16.4
1990	Alaska	36	31.00	.546	.000	.783	8.14	2.14	0.25	1.00	15.9
1990	Pepsi	10	37.50	.596	.000	.857	7.70	2.20	0.20	0.30	20.4
1991	2 Teams (Combined)	17	34.25	.559	.000	.801	8.04	2.15	0.24	0.85	16.8
1991	Pepsi	43	32.49	.513	.000	.798	7.95	2.44	0.34	**1.19**	16.8
1992	7-Up	55	34.55	.514	.333	.802	7.78	3.40	0.64	0.95	16.9
1993	7-Up	21	28.57	.491	.000	.774	7.05	1.86	0.52	0.62	13.4
1993	Shell Helix Ultra	9	16.89	.525	.000	.875	4.56	1.11	0.22	0.55	5.4
1994	Shell Rimula X	50	18.62	.553	.000	.794	4.44	0.72	0.16	0.50	8.0
1995	Shell	54	15.65	.488	.000	.760	3.43	0.74	0.30	0.19	4.5
Career		1081	27.49	.531	.350	.776	7.93	2.11	0.31	0.85	14.6

== Retirement and later life ==
In 2000, he was named as one of the PBA's 25 greatest players of all-time in elaborate awards ceremonies that highlighted the 25th anniversary of the league. After his retirement, he went into the construction business, and in 2003, he migrated to New Jersey in the United States with his family. Even in the U.S. he actively took part in benefit basketball events staged by the PBA Legends USA Foundation.

In 2007, he was enshrined into the PBA Hall of Fame along with Manny Paner, Danny Florencio, and Norman Black.

In 2010, he suffered from a serious ailment called Myasthenia Gravis and was admitted to the Intensive Care Unit (ICU) for eight days. He managed to survive from the illness by taking steroids.

In 2012, he suffered two strokes in a span of one week, and was diagnosed with meningitis. He was again admitted to the ICU as a result.

== Personal life ==
Guidaben, with his wife, Maridol, has four children (Maria Elizabeth, JR, Michael and Katherine) and several grandchildren.
