= 1989 PBA draft =

Player selection in Philippine basketball

General information
- Date: February 6, 1989

Overview
- League: Philippine Basketball Association
- First selection: Benjie Paras (Formula Shell)

The 1989 Philippine Basketball Association (PBA) rookie draft was an event at which teams drafted players from the amateur ranks. The draft was held on February 6, 1989.

== Round 1 ==
Pick	Player	Country of origin*	PBA team	College
1	Benjie Paras	Philippines	Formula Shell Zoom Masters	UP Diliman
2	Nelson Asaytono	Philippines	Purefoods Hotdogs	Manila
3	Zaldy Realubit	Philippines	Presto Ice Cream	San Jose Recoletos
4	Paul Alvarez	Philippines	Alaska Air Force	San Sebastian
5	Romeo Dela Rosa	Philippines	Añejo Rum 65	Southwestern
6	Bobby Jose	Philippines	San Miguel Beermen	Santo Tomas

== Round 2 ==
Pick	Player	Country of origin*	PBA team	College
	Dindo Pumaren	Philippines	Purefoods Hotdogs	De La Salle
	Elmer Cabahug	Philippines	Alaska Air Force	Visayas
	Hernani Demigillo	Philippines	Presto Ice Cream	San Sebastian
	Ricardo Marata	Philippines	Alaska Air Force	Southwestern
	Peter Aguilar	Philippines	Añejo Rum 65	Trinity (QC)
	Renato Agustin	Philippines	San Miguel Beermen	Lyceum

== Round 3 ==
Pick	Player	Country of origin*	PBA team	College
	Jerry Ruiz	Philippines	Formula Shell Zoom Masters	Letran
	Salvador Ramos	Philippines	Presto Ice Cream	Letran
	Edgardo Roque Jr.	Philippines	Alaska Air Force	UP Diliman
	Antonio Dela Cerna	Philippines	Purefoods Hotdogs	Baguio
	Fernando Garcia	Philippines	Añejo Rum 65	Adamson

== Round 4 ==
Pick	Player	Country of origin*	PBA team	College
	Calvin Tuadles	Philippines	Formula Shell Zoom Masters	Southwestern
	Roberto Andres	Philippines	Formula Shell Zoom Masters	Santo Tomas

== Undrafted players ==
- Silverio Palad, III
- Joselito Martin
- Joseph Pelaez
- George Ella
- Junel Baculi
