= Chito Loyzaga =

Filipino basketball player (born 1958)

Commissioner of the UAAP 76th season
- In office 2013–2014
- Preceded by: Ato Badolato
- Succeeded by: Andy Jao

Personal details
- Spouse: Toni Yulo
- Parent: Carlos Loyzaga
- Relatives: Joey Loyzaga (brother); Teresa Loyzaga (sister); Bing Loyzaga (sister)
- Basketball career

Personal information
- Born: August 28, 1958 (age 68) Manila, Philippines
- Listed height: 6 ft 2 in (1.88 m)
- Listed weight: 210 lb (95 kg)

Career information
- High school: San Beda (Manila)
- College: San Beda
- Playing career: 1981–1993
- Position: Power forward / small forward
- Number: 4, 14, 41

Career history
- 1981: YCO-Tanduay
- 1983: Toyota
- 1984–1985: Great Taste
- 1986–1993: Ginebra San Miguel

Career highlights
- As player: 7× PBA champion (1984 Second All-Filipino, 1984 Invitational, 1985 Open, 1985 All-Filipino, 1986 Open, 1988 All-Filipino, 1991 First); 4× PBA All-Star (1990, 1991, 1992, 1993); 50 Greatest Players in PBA History (2015 selection); 8× PBA All-Defensive Team (1985–1992); PBA Mythical Second Team (1986); Humanitarian/Citizenship Award (1993); As executive: PBA champion (2005 Fiesta)
Medals
Men's basketball
Representing Philippines
Asian Games
Silver medal – second place	1990 Beijing	Team

Joaquín "Chito" Cuerva Loyzaga (born August 29, 1958) is a Filipino former professional basketball player and commissioner. He played for the San Beda College in the NCAA before going on to play in the Philippine Basketball Association (PBA).

== PBA career ==
=== Early career ===
In the PBA, Loyzaga played one game for YCO-Tanduay, then migrated to Australia for two years. He came back to play for Toyota in 1983. After Toyota disbanded, Loyzaga moved to Great Taste, where he became part of the team's dynasty of four straight championships.

=== Ginebra ===
In 1986, he was shipped to Ginebra San Miguel, where he spent all of his last eight seasons in the PBA, winning three championships. A seven-time recipient of the Philippine Basketball Association All-Defensive Team award from 1985 to 1992, Loyzaga made a name for himself as a straight-up defensive stopper, using his heft and quick hands to guard the league's best big men, including the great Ramon Fernandez, and later, Alvin Patrimonio.

He retired from basketball after the 1993 PBA season.

== National team career ==
Loyzaga also played for the Philippines men's national basketball team in the 1990 Asian Games where he distinguished himself by helping limit North Korean center Ri Myung Hun despite a height discrepancy of over a foot and a half between them.

== Post-retirement ==
In 2002, Loyzaga became the fourth commissioner of the Metropolitan Basketball Association. He served as general manager of San Miguel Beermen, from 2004 until 2006. He was also a commissioner and executive director of the Philippine Sports Commission from 2010 to 2012. In 2013, he served as a basketball commissioner in the 76th Season of the UAAP. On April 9, 2015, he was appointed the Athletics Director of the National University for their Bulldogs sports program, replacing Junel Baculi.

== Personal life ==
Loyzaga is the son of Philippine basketball great Carlos Loyzaga and Vicky Cuerva. He and brother Joey Loyzaga became one of the few siblings to play in the PBA, eventually playing with Ginebra San Miguel.

He is married to Ma. Antonia "Toni" Yulo, with whom he has three children, namely: Celina, Jose Joaquin, and Cecilia. Yulo was executive director of the Manila Observatory from 2007 to 2016, and former president of National Resilience Council. In July 2022, she was appointed secretary of the Department of Environment and Natural Resources by President Bongbong Marcos.

Preceded by Ato Badolato	UAAP Commissioner; 2013–14	Succeeded by Andy Jao
