= 1993 PBA All-Star Game =

South All-Stars	North All-Stars
129	149
- Date: June 6, 1993
- Venue: Cuneta Astrodome, Pasay, Metro Manila
- MVP: Allan Caidic (SMB)
- Network: Vintage Sports (PTV)

The 1993 PBA All-Star Game is the annual all-star weekend of the Philippine Basketball Association (PBA). The events were held on June 6, 1993, at the Cuneta Astrodome in Pasay.

== Skills challenge winners ==
- Slam Dunk Competition: Vergel Meneses
- Three-point shootout: Elmer Cabahug (11-10 over Allan Caidic in the sudden death shootout after the first two rounds)

== Special Feature ==
Showbiz stars entertain the fans with a basketball game as they await the main PBA All-Star event. Four Da Boys, led by Willie Revillame with 22 points and playing-coach Phillip Salvador won over D'Kool Doods of Edu Manzano, 85–71. Among those who also played were Cesar Montano, Jinggoy Estrada, Anjo Yllana and former PBA player turned comedian Jimmy Santos, who provide the comic relief.

== All-Star Game ==
=== Rosters ===
North All-Stars:

- Ato Agustin (San Miguel)
- Samboy Lim (San Miguel)
- Allan Caidic (San Miguel)
- Hector Calma (San Miguel)
- Jerry Codiñera (Purefoods)
- Alvin Patrimonio (Purefoods)
- Victor Pablo (Seven-Up)
- Bobby Jose (Alaska)
- Ronnie Magsanoc (Shell)
- Vergel Meneses (Swift)
- Chito Loyzaga (Ginebra)
- Manny Victorino (Ginebra)
- Coach: Derrick Pumaren (Seven-Up)

South All-Stars:

- Nelson Asaytono (Swift)
- Rudy Distrito (Swift)
- Alfonso Solis (Swift)
- Boy Cabahug (Purefoods)
- Dindo Pumaren (Purefoods)
- Abet Guidaben (Seven-Up)
- Pido Jarencio (Ginebra)
- Jun Limpot (Sta.Lucia)
- Jojo Lastimosa (Alaska)
- Ramon Fernandez (San Miguel)
- Yves Dignadice (San Miguel)
- Alvin Teng (San Miguel)
- Coach: Norman Black (San Miguel)

=== Game ===
Vintage

June 6

North All-Stars 149, South All-Stars 129
Pts: Allan Caidic 40
Allan Caidic was named the game's most valuable player, topscored for the North All-Stars with 40 points atop his record setting 9 three-point shots.

Cuneta Astrodome, Pasay

== Recognitions ==
Three of the league Pioneers; Fortunato "Atoy" Co, Philip Cezar and Bernie Fabiosa were presented Plaque of Recognitions by the PBA during the All-Star Event.
