= Edmund Reyes =

Filipino former basketball player

Personal information
- Born: August 24, 1971 (age 55)
- Listed height: 6 ft 3 in (1.91 m)
- Listed weight: 198 lb (90 kg)

Career information
- High school: Good Shepherd Academy (Victoria, Oriental Mindoro)
- College: UST
- PBA draft: 1995: 1st round, 7th overall pick
- Drafted by: Purefoods TJ Hotdogs
- Playing career: 1995–2003
- Position: Power forward
- Number: 5, 20

Career history
- 1995–1999: Purefoods Tender Juicy Hotdogs
- 2000–2004: Red Bull Barako

Career highlights
- As player: 3× PBA champion (1997 All-Filipino, 2001 Commissioner's, 2002 Commissioner's); 2× UAAP champion (1993, 1994)

Edmund Reyes (born August 24, 1971) is a former Filipino basketball player.

== Playing career ==
Reyes played for UST Growling Tigers under coach Aric del Rosario, and notably played with Udoy Belmonte, Patrick Fran, Rey Evangelista, Dennis Espino, Aric's son Lester, and Siot Tanquingcen.

In 1992, his first year, he saw his team losing to FEU Tamaraws due to interruption by a power outage, but due to UAAP Board's decision to reschedule the last 3 minutes of the game, UST ended up losing, 76–87.

The team later won the 1993 championship by sweeping all of their opponents, and got a mythical second team. He won another championship with the team in 1994, on his final year.

In the 1995 draft, he was selected by Purefoods, and stayed for the team until 1999, but the Purefoods let him go to the 2000 expansion draft. He was signed by Red Bull Barako from 2000 until 2004.
