= 1996 PBA All-Star Weekend =

Series of basketball events in the Philippines

Rookies-Sophomores-Juniors	Veterans
131	115
- Date: July 26–28, 1996
- Venue: Cuneta Astrodome, Pasay
- MVP: Kenneth Duremdes (Sunkist)
- Network: Vintage Sports (IBC)

The 1996 PBA All-Star Weekend is the annual all-star weekend of the Philippine Basketball Association (PBA). The All-Star Fans Day was held on July 26 at the Araneta Coliseum in Quezon City while the All-Star Game was held on July 28 at the Cuneta Astrodome in Pasay.

== Skills Challenge Winners ==
- Buzzer-Beater Contest: Jack Santiago (Sunkist)
- Three-point Shootout: Ric-Ric Marata (Sunkist)
- Slam Dunk Team Competition: Marlou Aquino and Noli Locsin (Ginebra)

== All-Star Game ==
=== Rosters ===
Rookies-Sophomores-Juniors:

- Marlou Aquino (Ginebra)
- Jeffrey Cariaso (Alaska)
- Bal David (Ginebra)
- Kenneth Duremdes (Sunkist)
- Dennis Espino (Sta. Lucia)
- Rey Evangelista (Purefoods)
- EJ Feihl (Ginebra)
- Poch Juinio (Alaska)
- Vince Hizon (Ginebra)
- Noli Locsin (Ginebra)
- Wilmer Ong (Ginebra)
- Rodney Santos (Purefoods)
- Coach: Robert Jaworski (Ginebra)

Veterans:

- Johnny Abarrientos (Alaska)
- Ato Agustin (Sunkist)
- Nelson Asaytono (San Miguel)
- Paul Alvarez (San Miguel)
- Jerry Codiñera (Purefoods)
- Bong Hawkins (Alaska)
- Samboy Lim (San Miguel)
- Vergel Meneses (Sunkist)
- Jojo Lastimosa (Alaska)
- Benjie Paras (Shell)
- Alvin Patrimonio (Purefoods)
- Dindo Pumaren (Purefoods)
- Coach: Norman Black (San Miguel)

=== Game ===
Vintage

July 28
6:20 p.m.

Rookies-Sophomores-Juniors 131, Veterans 115
Kenneth Duremdes was named the game's most valuable player.

Cuneta Astrodome, Pasay
