= 1994 PBA All-Star Game =

North All-Stars	South All-Stars
133	126
	1	2	3	4	Total
North All-Stars	29	32	46	26	133
South All-Stars	28	27	32	39	126
- Date: June 12, 1994
- Venue: Cuneta Astrodome, Pasay
- MVP: Benjie Paras (Shell)
- Attendance: 6,992
- Network: Vintage Sports (PTV)

The 1994 PBA All-Star Game is the annual all-star weekend of the Philippine Basketball Association (PBA). The events were held on June 12, 1994, at Cuneta Astrodome in Pasay.

== All-Star Game ==
=== Rosters ===
North All-Stars:

- Johnny Abarrientos (Alaska)
- Ato Agustin (San Miguel)
- Sonny Cabatu (Tondeña)
- Allan Caidic (San Miguel)
- Jerry Codiñera (Coney Island)
- Gerry Esplana (Sta. Lucia)
- Jayvee Gayoso (Tondeña)
- Bong Hawkins (Alaska)
- Ronnie Magsanoc (Shell)
- Vergel Meneses (Swift)
- Victor Pablo (Pepsi)
- Benjie Paras (Shell)
- Coach: Chot Reyes (Coney Island)

South All-Stars:

- Boy Cabahug (Pepsi)
- Romeo dela Rosa (Sta. Lucia)
- Rey Evangelista (Coney Island)
- Ramon Fernandez (San Miguel)
- Abet Guidaben (Shell)
- Jojo Lastimosa (Alaska)
- Jun Limpot (Sta. Lucia)
- Noli Locsin (Tondeña)
- Franz Pumaren (San Miguel)
- Dindo Pumaren (Pepsi)
- Jack Tanuan (Swift)
- Alvin Teng (San Miguel)
- Coach: Tim Cone (Alaska)

=== Game ===
Vintage

June 12
6:20 p.m.

North All-Stars 133, South All-Stars 126
Scoring by quarter: 29–28, 32–27, 46–32, 26–39
Pts: Benjie Paras 30	Pts: Jun Limpot 26
Benjie Paras was named the game's most valuable player.

Cuneta Astrodome, Pasay
Attendance: 6,992
Referees: E. de Leon, A. Bartolome., I. Varela

== Skills Challenge Winners ==
- Buzzer-Beater Contest: Ato Agustin (San Miguel) and Richie Ticzon (Coney Island) were declared co-winners.
- Three-point Shootout: Ric-Ric Marata (Shell)
- Slam Dunk Competition: Victor Pablo (Pepsi)
