= Gerry Esplana =

Filipino former basketball player, coach and politician

Member of the Valenzuela City Council from 1st District
- In office June 30, 2004 – June 30, 2013

Personal details
- Born: Gerald A. Esplana; October 27, 1966 (age 60)
- Party: NPC (2010–2013); Lakas–Kampi (2004–2010)
- Basketball career

Personal information
- Listed height: 5 ft 11 in (1.80 m)
- Listed weight: 180 lb (82 kg)

Career information
- High school: San Beda (Manila)
- College: FEU
- PBA draft: 1990: 2nd round, 9th overall pick
- Drafted by: Presto Tivoli
- Playing career: 1990–2002
- Position: Point guard
- Number: 14, 30
- Coaching career: 2011–2019

Career history

Playing
- 1990–1992: Presto
- 1993–1997: Sta. Lucia Realtors
- 1998–2002: Shell Turbo Chargers

Coaching
- 2011–2014: EAC
- 2016–2017: UST (assistant)
- 2019: Valenzuela Classics

Career highlights
- As player: 3× PBA champion (1990 All-Filipino, 1998 Governors', 1999 All-Filipino); PBA Finals MVP (1999 All-Filipino); PBA Rookie of the Year (1990); 4× PBA All-Star (1990, 1991, 1994, 1999)

Gerald "Gerry" Esplana (born October 27, 1966) is a former Filipino basketball player, politician and coach. He was nicknamed "Mr. Cool" and "The Plan" while playing professionally.

== Playing career ==
He played for Presto Tivoli (when he won PBA Rookie of the Year), Sta. Lucia Realtors, and Shell Turbo Chargers (when he won two championships and a Finals MVP trophy).

== Coaching career ==
He formerly coached the EAC Generals in the NCAA and the Valenzuela Classics in the MPBL. He also assisted Boy Sablan on the UST Growling Tigers.

== Others ==
He served as former councilor in Valenzuela from 2004 to 2013. On November 22, 2023, he was appointed as the commissioner of the Pilipinas Super League.

== Coaching record ==
=== Collegiate record ===
Season	Team	Elimination round					Playoffs				
Season	Team	GP	W	L	PCT	Finish	GP	W	L	PCT	Results
2011	EAC	18	4	14	.222	10th	–	–	–	–	Eliminated
2012	EAC	18	8	10	.444	7th	–	–	–	–	Eliminated
2013	EAC	18	10	8	.556	5th	–	–	–	–	Eliminated
2014	EAC	18	4	14	.222	9th	–	–	–	–	Eliminated
Totals		72	26	46	.361		0	0	0	.000	0 championships

== Personal life ==
Esplana married Jennifer Pingree, 1990 Binibining Pilipinas Ms. International titleholder.

The couple has three children; Alyssa, Josiah and Jairus.
