= Samboy Lim =

Filipino basketball player (1962–2023)

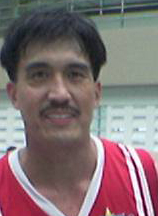
- Lim in 2004

Personal information
- Born: April 1, 1962 Quezon City, Philippines
- Died: December 23, 2023 (aged 61) Pasig, Philippines
- Listed height: 6 ft 0 in (1.83 m)
- Listed weight: 185 lb (84 kg)

Career information
- High school: San Beda (Manila)
- College: Letran
- Playing career: 1986–1997
- Position: Small forward, shooting guard
- Number: 9

Career history
- 1986: Lhuillier Jewelers
- 1986–1997: Magnolia Cheese/San Miguel Beer/San Miguel Beermen
- 1998: Welcoat House Paints

Career highlights
- As player: 9× PBA champion (1987 Reinforced, 1988 Open, 1988 Reinforced, 1989 Open, 1989 All-Filipino, 1989 Reinforced, 1992 All-Filipino, 1993 Governors'); PBA Sportsmanship Award (1993); PBA All-Star Game MVP (1990); 5× PBA All-Star (1989, 1990, 1992, 1993, 1996); 2× PBA Mythical Second Team (1990, 1993); PBA Grand Slam champion (1989); 50 Greatest Players in PBA History (2000 selection); PBA Hall of Fame Class of 2009; No. 9 retired by the San Miguel Beermen; 3× NCAA Philippines champion (1982, 1983, 1984); NCAA Philippines Most Valuable Player (1984); PABL champion (1986 Invitational); As executive: 2× PBA champion (2007 Philippine, 2008 Fiesta)
Medals
Men's basketball
Representing Philippines
ABC Championship
Gold medal – first place	1985 Kuala Lumpur	Team
FIBA Asia Club Championship
Gold medal – first place	1984 Ipoh	Team
Asian Games
Bronze medal – third place	1986 Seoul	Team
Silver medal – second place	1990 Beijing	Team
SEA Games
Gold medal – first place	1983 Singapore	Team
Gold medal – first place	1985 Bangkok	Team

Avelino "Samboy" Borromeo Lim Jr. (April 1, 1962 – December 23, 2023), nicknamed "The Skywalker", was a Filipino professional basketball player of the Philippine Basketball Association and the national team in the 1980s and 1990s.

As a high-flying wing, he distinguished himself with his flamboyant and often dangerous forays to the basket, punctuated by acrobatic shots, hang-time moves, or slam dunks. Lim was a five-time All-Star and two-time PBA Mythical Team selection, but he did not win a Most Valuable Player award because he did not complete a full season due to the multiple injuries he sustained on the court.

== Career ==
Lim was discovered at 15-years old while playing on the courts of Phil-Am Life Homes in Quezon City by former basketball player, Jun Celis. This subsequently led to athletic scholarships, which were helpful given that his father, Dr. Avelino B. Lim Sr., died due to coronary thrombosis just as the younger Lim was entering high school.

=== Amateur career ===
After high school in San Beda, Samboy spent a year's residence at Letran before finally seeing action in the NCAA in 1982. Even as a first-year varsity player for the Letran Knights, Samboy was already a significant contributor to Letran's championship team. In 1983, Lim was remembered for the "Asthma series" against the San Sebastian Stags, where he had asthma throughout the championship series. Trailing the best-of-three series 1–0, Lim was fetched from the University of Santo Tomas Hospital on Game 2 to score 12 points, routing the Stags, then scored 20 points in the title-clinching Game 3. Samboy was all set to join the NCC squad of coach Ron Jacobs even before the start of the 1984 NCAA tournament but he begged for a grace period so he could play in the collegiate league. Samboy won the NCAA MVP trophy as he led the Knights to their third straight NCAA seniors' championships from 1982 to 1984, under coach Larry Albano.

Lim was a consistent national team member. His first stint with the national team was during the 1983 SEA Games in Singapore, where the Philippines retained the title. In 1984, he was a mainstay of the RP Youth team and the RP quintet in the Asian Interclub. He readily marched off to the Ron Jacobs camp the following year and as a rookie of the Northern Consolidated squad, the guest amateur quintet in the PBA. He dislodged several stars from their starting position and was always among the first five players off the bench. Samboy won championships with the nationals in the Jones Cup, SEA Games, and the ABC crown in early 1986. After the NCC core disbanded, he was selected as part of the Philippine national team that competed in the 1986 Asian Games. He was one of the main players and top scorers of the national team that went on to win the bronze medal.

Samboy's first commercial team was the Lhuillier Jewelers in the Philippine Amateur Basketball league First Conference in 1986. He spearheaded the ballclub to a title, together with Jojo Lastimosa and Al Solis.

=== Professional career ===
In September 1986, Lim was included in the line-up of the comebacking San Miguel Beer in the Philippine Basketball Association, which the team to be known as Magnolia Cheese, in the 1986 PBA Open Conference.

Lim was injury-prone for the next two seasons (1987–88), although he helped the San Miguel Beermen earn the 1988 PBA Open Conference title. Lim's outstanding hang time earned him the monicker "Skywalker" and previous injuries did not stop him from playing with recklessly and coming up with acrobatic shots.

Sat out 11 games early in the 1989 PBA Open Conference, Samboy missed "only" 18 games the whole season, the year San Miguel Beermen won the grand slam and Lim was the team's third-leading scorer with 15.2 ppg (13th-best in the league that season).

Lim finally had an injury-free season in 1990. This resulted in his emerging as San Miguel's leading scorer. Lim scored 42 points in the 2nd PBA All-Star Game and was named Most Valuable Player. He was hands down choice as a member of the RP Team in the Asian Games in Beijing, China, and was selected in the Asian Games Mythical five. Samboy could have made it to the Mythical five in the PBA for the first time had his team fared better in the Third Conference. Nevertheless, the Dragon, as he was often called besides the Skywalker, settled for the Mythical Ten.

In 1993, he was awarded with the first ever sportsmanship award for his exemplary behavior on the court. Lim was also a member of the Mythical Second Team Selection twice (1990 and 1993). His remarkable play was a joy to watch and he was a constant fan favorite because of his aerial maneuvers. However, also because of those seemingly inhuman skills, Lim suffered numerous serious injuries that limited his PBA career to just nine seasons. Despite the fact that he never won an MVP award, Lim was considered by fans as the "Real MVP."

Throughout his career, he sported jersey no. 9 and wore knee-high socks, his testament and tribute to his idol Julius "Dr. J" Erving even though he stood only five feet eleven inches tall.

=== Later career and retirement ===
Lim retired from the PBA in 1997. In 1998, he joined the Philippine Basketball League to play for the Welcoat House Paints in a guest appearance. In 2000, he was named into the PBA's 25 Greatest Players. In his entire PBA career, he played for only one team, San Miguel Beer, he later served as San Miguel team manager. In 2006, he assumed the team manager post of SMB's sister team Barangay Ginebra Kings until 2013.

In 2005, PBA fans had another chance to see him put his intensity and high-wire forays back on the court as he suited up for the PBA Greats Team. The PBA Greatest Game was held in the Araneta Coliseum as thousands of fans watched their favorite legends and great players of all time play. Lim scored 29 points in that game.

On October 6, 2016, the PBA renamed the Sportsmanship Award in his honor as he was the first recipient of the feat. It is given to a PBA player who most "exemplifies the ideals of Sportsmanship on the court – ethical behavior, fair play, and integrity".

== Personal life ==
Samboy Lim was married to Solicitor General Darlene Berberabe, the former CEO of the Pag-IBIG Fund, and former dean of the University of the Philippines College of Law. Berberabe and Lim later separated. Their only child, Jamie, is a 2019 SEA Games gold medalist and summa cum laude graduate of BS Mathematics from the University of the Philippines Diliman.

=== Illness and death ===
Lim's health had been an issue during his playing days, with the numerous injuries he suffered as a result of his stunts on the court. After his retirement from active play, he kept himself fit by lifting weights, jogging, and playing basketball. He also set up a basketball clinic for children. In the early part of 2005, Samboy Lim started conducting basketball training classes and summer camps. His training regimen and modules focused on ball handling, dribbling, passing, shooting, lay-ups, and defense. In 2010, the Samboy Lim Player Development Academy was created. Enrollment was highly successful especially for the summer basketball camps. Unfortunately, the program was discontinued when he suffered a heart attack in November 2014.

On the evening of November 28, 2014, Lim was rushed to a hospital unconscious after having collapsed just minutes after coming out of a PBA Legends exhibition game at the Ynares Center in Pasig. According to fellow player Nelson Asaytono, Legends coach Bogs Adornado pulled Lim out of the game, then Lim had been doing stretches on the sidelines when he collapsed. He slipped into a coma and was first admitted to the intensive care unit of The Medical City before he was later transferred to the intermediate care unit. On January 14, 2015, he slipped out of his comatose state and was brought home where he continued to receive treatment and therapy.

Lim's story became instrumental in the passage of Republic Act 10871, "The Basic Life Support Training in Schools Act" or "Samboy Lim Law". The bill authored by Yeng Guiao in 2015, was filed in honor of Lim. The law provides for basic life support training or CPR in public and private high schools.

Years after that medical emergency, Lim continued to receive 24-hour medical care and was constantly attended to by a team of doctors, physical therapists, and nurses.

Lim died on December 23, 2023, at the age of 61. Colegio de San Juan de Letran, the National Collegiate Athletic Association, and the Philippine Basketball Association all dedicated tributes to Lim. The Philippine Heart Association also paid tribute to Lim as he was the inspiration for the CPR law.

== Career PBA highlights ==
- Member, PBA's 25 Greatest Players
- 2-time Mythical Second Team Selection (1990 and 1993)
- First ever recipient of the Sportsmanship Award (1993)
- 5-time PBA All-Star (1989, 1990, 1992, 1993, 1996)
- 1990 PBA All-Star Game MVP (Scored 42 points) All-Star Team
- PBA's 25 Greatest Player Award
- PBA's 40 Greatest Player Award
- PBA Hall of Fame Award, Class 2009
- 9 Time Member – PBA Champion San Miguel Beermen (1987 PBA Reinforced Conference, 1988 PBA Open Conference, 1988 PBA Reinforced Conference, 1989 PBA Open Conference, 1989 PBA All-Filipino Conference, 1989 PBA Reinforced Conference, 1992 PBA All-Filipino Conference, 1993 PBA Governors' Cup, 1994 All-Filipino Cup)
- No. 9 retired by the San Miguel Beermen

== Other highlights ==
- MVP, 1982 ASEAN School Youth Championship
- NCAA GRAND SLAM Team, 1982, 1983, and 1984, (Letran Knights)
- Most Valuable Player Award, 1983 Guam International Basketball Tournament (Letran Knights)
- NCAA MVP 1984 (Letran Knights)
- 1990 Asian Games Mythical Five, also known as XI ASIAD or 11th Asian Games held in Beijing, China
- Member, 1990 Asian Games (Silver Medal)
- Member, 1986 Asian Games (Bronze Medal)
- Member, Mythical Five (1990 Asian Games)

Winning Championships:

- NCAA Seniors Grandslam Team Letran, 1982, 1983, and 1984
- 1983 Southeast Asian (SEA) Games Champion, which was held in Singapore
- 1984 Brunei Invitational Basketball Tournament Champion (Letran Knights)
- 1984 FIBA Asian Club Basketball Cup Champion NCC/San Miguel Philippines
- 1985 Southeast Asian (SEA) Games Champion NCC/San Miguel Philippines, which was held in Thailand
- 1985 PBA Reinforced Conference Champion (Amateur Guest Team) NCC
- 1985 William Jones Cup International Basketball Champion NCC/San Miguel Philippines
- 1985 ABC Champion NCC, also known as FIBA Asia Cup Tournament in Malaysia
- FIBA Asia Champion NCC/San Miguel Philippines, 1986
- PABL Champions Lhulliers Jewellers Team, 1986
