= Dindo Pumaren =

Filipino retired basketball player and coach

Personal information
- Born: November 23, 1965 (age 60)
- Listed height: 5 ft 9 in (1.75 m)
- Listed weight: 200 lb (91 kg)

Career information
- High school: San Beda (Manila)
- College: De La Salle
- PBA draft: 1989: 2nd round, 7th overall pick
- Drafted by: Purefoods Hotdogs
- Playing career: 1989–2002
- Position: Point guard
- Coaching career: 2004–2017

Career history

Playing
- 1989–1993; 1996–2001: Coney Island/Purefoods
- 1994–1995: Pepsi Mega
- 2001: Tanduay Rhum Masters
- 2002: FedEx Express

Coaching
- 2004–2008: UE
- 2009: De La Salle (assistant)
- 2010–2011: De La Salle
- 2014–2017: UE (assistant)

Career highlights
- As player: 4× PBA champion (1990 Third, 1991 All-Filipino 1993 All-Filipino, 1997 All-Filipino); 2x PBA Mythical Second Team (1997, 2000); 10x PBA All-Star (1989, 1990, 1991, 1992, 1993, 1994, 1995, 1996, 1997, 1998); PBL Champions (1987 Maharlika); Philippine Basketball League Mythical Team (1987 Maharlika); As head coach: CCL champion (2006); Filoil Flying V Preseason Cup champion (2008)
Medals
Men's basketball
Representing Philippines
Asian Games
Bronze medal – third place	1986 Seoul	Team
SEA Games
Gold medal – first place	1987 Jakarta	Team

Ferdinand "Dindo" Pumaren, is a retired Filipino professional basketball player and former collegiate coach. In his professional playing career, he was nicknamed "The Bullet" due to his great passing and stealing.

== Early career ==
Pumaren suited up for San Beda in high school, teaming up with fellow future pros Magsanoc, Altamirano, Paras, Gerry Esplana and Macky de Joya in a formidable squad that won the NCAA and the national secondary crowns in the early 80s. Pumaren played collegiate ball for De La Salle Green Archers under the watch of his older brother, Derrick. While at La Salle, he studied BS-Commerce Major in Marketing Management course. He also played for Philippine basketball (RP) team for the 1986 Asian Games' basketball tournament.

== Professional career ==
Pumaren was drafted by Purefoods Hotdogs in 1989, and played for the team until 1994, when the won four championships.

He was traded for Pepsi for some draft picks and played for them for two seasons. He was traded back to Purefoods and won a championship in 1997. He played for the team until 2001, when he was traded to Tanduay for a future draft pick. He was absorbed by then FedEx Express, who replaced the Tanduay franchise. He retired in the end of 2002 PBA season.

== Coaching career ==
=== UE ===
Pumaren was hired as head coach of UE Red Warriors, with his brother and school alumni Derrick as their consultant. He led them to five consecutive UAAP Final Four appearances that includes a one finals loss (because they ended up as undefeated in eliminations, so they will skip Final Four) against his alma mater, La Salle coached by his brother Franz and led by JV Casio. He was replaced by Lawrence Chongson.

=== La Salle ===
La Salle, his alma mater was hired him to replace his brother, Franz, who runs for a political position in Quezon City. He led the Archers to a final four appearance in 2010, but a dismal performance in the next year. He was replaced by future San Miguel Beermen manager Gee Abanilla.

=== Potential UE rehire ===
He was rumored to return as Red Warriors' head coach, but the Red Warriors decided to hire his brother, Derrick.

== Coaching record ==
=== Collegiate record ===
Season	Team	Elimination round					Playoffs				
Season	Team	GP	W	L	PCT	Finish	GP	W	L	PCT	Results
2004	UE	14	8	6	.571	4th	1	0	1	.000	Semifinals
2005	UE	14	10	4	.714	4th	2	0	2	.000	Semifinals
2006	UE	14	8	4	.667	2nd	2	0	2	.000	Semifinals
2007	UE	14	14	0	1.000	1st	2	0	2	.000	Runner-up
2008	UE	14	9	5	.643	4th	1	0	1	.000	Semifinals
2010	DLSU	14	8	6	.571	4th	1	0	1	.000	Semifinals
2011	DLSU	14	5	9	.357	6th	—	—	—	—	Eliminated
Totals		96	62	34	.645		9	0	9	.000	0 championships

Preceded by Boyzie Zamar	UE Red Warriors men's basketball head coach 2004-2008	Succeeded by Lawrence Chongson
Preceded by Franz Pumaren	De La Salle Green Archers men's basketball head coach 2010-2011	Succeeded by Gee Abanilla
