= E.J. Feihl =

Filipino basketball player

San Sebastian Stags
- Title: Assistant coach
- League: NCAA Philippines

Personal information
- Born: March 27, 1970 (age 56) Santa Barbara, Pangasinan, Philippines
- Listed height: 7 ft 1 in (2.16 m)
- Listed weight: 285 lb (129 kg)

Career information
- College: UST; Adamson
- PBA draft: 1995: 1st round, 2nd overall pick
- Drafted by: Ginebra San Miguel
- Playing career: 1995–2007
- Position: Center
- Coaching career: 2025–present

Career history

Playing
- 1995–1997: Ginebra San Miguel, Gordon's Gin Boars
- 1997: AMA Cybertigers
- 1997–2001: Purefoods J Hotdogs
- 2001–2002: Barangay Ginebra Kings
- 2002–2004: Alaska Aces
- 2005–2006: Red Bull Barako
- 2006–2007: Welcoat Dragons

Coaching
- 2025: Mindoro Tamaraws (assistant)
- 2026–present: San Sebastian (assistant)

Career highlights
- 3x PBA champion (1997 Commissioner's, 2003 Invitational, 2005–06 Fiesta); 2x PBA All-Star (1995, 1996)
Medals
Men's basketball
Representing Philippines
Asian Games
Bronze medal – third place	1998 Bangkok	Team
William Jones Cup
Gold medal – first place	1998 Taipei	Team

Edward Joseph Feihl (born March 27, 1970) is a Filipino professional basketball coach and retired player of German Filipino descent who is an assistant coach for the San Sebastian Stags of the NCAA Philippines.

He stands 7'1" tall, making him the tallest Filipino professional basketball player ever to play in the PBA.

== College ==
At the UAAP, Feihl debuted for the UST in 1990 but decided to play for the Adamson led by Kenneth Duremdes and Marlou Aquino the following season. In 1992, he helped the collegiate team reach the final but conceded the title to Johnny Abarrientos-led FEU. He represented the Philippines in several international competitions.

== PBA ==
Feihl was drafted by Gordon's Gin Boars in 1995 and played for two seasons with the team. A controversial talk about a contract extension led to Feihl's departure in 1997. He then played briefly for the AMA Cybertigers in the Philippine Basketball League.

In the 1997 PBA Governors' Cup, Feihl was traded by Ginebra, then already named the Gordon's Gin Boars, to the Purefoods in exchange for Cris Bolado. Feihl played for the team from 1997 to 2001 before he was traded back to the Boars.

In 1998, Feihl was a member of the Philippine Centennial Team that took home a bronze medal in the Bangkok Asian Games. In that team, he reunited with Aquino and Duremdes. In 2002, he was part of the RP National Pool for the 2002 Asian Games, though he didn't make the final cut.

Feihl did not play a single game in his second stint with Barangay Ginebra as he was sent to the Alaska Aces in exchange for James Wallkvist in 2002. Feihl would go on to play for the Aces until 2004.

In 2005–06 season he joined the Red Bull Barako spending most of his time on the reserve list. In the middle of the eliminations of the All Filipino Conference of the 2006–07 season, he was signed by the Welcoat Dragons.

In 2007, Feihl announced his retirement from professional basketball.

== Other ==
In 2017, it was reported that Feihl will play with the General Santos Kings of the Mindanao Basketball League, a regional minor league.

In 2018, Feihl served as the Pit Stop greeter during the 10th leg of The Amazing Race 32 in Manila, Philippines at Rizal Park.

In January 2026, Feihl was announced as part of Tony Tan's coaching staff for the San Sebastian Stags.
