= Jerry Codiñera =

Filipino basketball player and coach

Personal information
- Born: November 14, 1966 (age 60)
- Listed height: 6 ft 5 in (1.96 m)
- Listed weight: 210 lb (95 kg)

Career information
- College: UE
- PBA draft: 1988: direct hire
- Drafted by: Purefoods TJ Hotdogs
- Playing career: 1988–2005
- Position: Center
- Coaching career: 2006–2023

Career history

Playing
- 1988–1999: Purefoods Tender Juicy Giants
- 1999–2002: Mobiline Phone Pals
- 2002–2005: FedEx Express

Coaching
- 2006: Teletech Titans
- 2011–2012: UE
- 2013–2018: Arellano
- 2018: Imus Bandera
- 2022: Homelab Nation – Bagong Cabuyao
- 2023: Bulacan Kuyas

Career highlights
- 5× PBA champion (1990 Third, 1991 All-Filipino, 1993 All-Filipino, 1994 Commissioner's, 1997 All-Filipino); PBA Defensive Player of the Year (1994); 2× PBA Sportsmanship Award (1994, 1996); 2× PBA Best Player of the Conference (1994 All-Filipino, 1998 Governors'); 11× PBA All-Star (1989, 1990, 1991, 1992, 1993, 1994, 1995, 1996, 1997, 1998, 1999); 10× PBA All-Defensive Team (1989–1998); 3× PBA Mythical First Team (1993–1994, 1998); 5× PBA Mythical Second Team (1988–1989, 1991–1992, 1997); 50 Greatest Players in PBA History (2000 selection); Member of the PBA 10,000 points club; Member of the PBA 5,000 points club; Member of the PBA 2,000 defensive rebound club; Member of the PBA 2,000 offensive rebound club; Member of the PBA 1,000 offensive rebound club; PBA All-time leader in career offensive rebounds; 2x PABL champion (1986 Founder's, 1987 Maharlika); PABL Most Valuable Player (1985 Challenge to Champion's); PBL 20 Greatest Players of All-Time (2003); 2x UAAP Champion (1984–1985); No. 44 retired by Purefoods
Medals
Men's basketball
Representing Philippines
ABC Championship
Gold medal – first place	1985 Kuala Lumpur	Team
Asian Games
Bronze medal – third place	1986 Seoul	Team
SEA Games
Gold medal – first place	1985 Bangkok	Team
Gold medal – first place	1987 Jakarta	Team

Jerry Herman Codiñera (born November 14, 1966) is a Filipino former coach and retired professional basketball player of the Philippine Basketball Association (PBA). He is nicknamed the "Defense Minister" for his prowess at the defensive end.

== Basketball career ==
=== Collegiate / amateur career ===
Codiñera played college basketball at the University of the East. With Allan Caidic, they led the UE Red Warriors to back-to-back championships in 1984–1985, the last championship of the Red Warriors in UAAP. Prior to joining the PBA in 1988, he played for Magnolia in the Philippine Amateur Basketball League (PABL, now the Philippine Basketball League).

=== Professional career ===
For 12 seasons suiting up for Purefoods, Codiñera was one half of the most dominant duo to ever terrorize the All-Filipino hardcourts. But a trade split up his partnership with Alvin Patrimonio and saw him wear a new jersey for the first time since joining the PBA in 1988. On July 8, 1999, in the middle of the 1999 PBA Commissioner's Cup, he was traded to Mobiline for Andy Seigle.

A perennial member of the All-Defensive Team, he was given the moniker "Defense Minister" for his manning of the post. The 6-5 Codiñera also contributed on the offensive end with a mid-range jumpshot. He came close to winning an MVP award in 1993 but lost to Patrimonio in the tightest race in league history. He also won the first PBA Best Player of the Conference award back in the 1994 All-Filipino Cup.

He is also a member of the "25 Best Players of all Time" of PBA and Philippine men's national basketball team of the 1994 Asian Games.

His #44 jersey was retired along with Rey Evangelista's #7 by the Purefoods franchise on November 9, 2014, before their game against Ginebra at the Smart Araneta Coliseum.

=== Coaching career ===
He made his head coaching debut with the Teletech Titans in the Philippine Basketball League in 2006. He also served as one of the assistant coaches of the UP Fighting Maroons.

In January 2011, he was named head coach of the University of the East Red Warriors. He was relieved of his coaching duties midway through the 2012 UAAP season after amassing a 1–6 win–loss record in the first round. He was later reassigned as UE sports consultant.

On December 13, 2013, he took over the coaching duties for the Arellano Chiefs, replacing Koy Banal. In his first season with the Chiefs during the 2014 NCAA season, he helped the squad earn a remarkable 13–5 win–loss record as second place after the eliminations and secure a twice-to-beat advantage and ticket to the finals against San Beda Red Lions.

On February 20, 2018, he made his head coaching debut for Imus Bandera of Maharlika Pilipinas Basketball League

=== Coaching record ===
==== Collegiate record ====
Season	Team	GP	W	L	PCT	Finish	GP	W	L	PCT	Results
2011	UE	14	3	11	.214	7th	–	–	–	–	Eliminated
2012	UE	7	1	6	.143	T–6th	–	–	–	–	(reassigned)^{a}
2014	AU	18	13	5	.722	2nd	4	1	3	.250	Finals
2015	AU	18	12	6	.667	5th	1	0	1	.000	4th seed playoff
2016	AU	18	14	4	.778	2nd	4	1	3	.250	Finals
2017	AU	18	9	9	.500	6th	1	0	1	.000	4th seed playoff
2018	AU	11	4	7	.364	6th	–	–	–	–	(resigned)
Totals		104	56	48	.538		10	2	8	.200	0 championship

^{a}Appointed as UE sports consultant

=== As a television analyst ===
Codiñera served as a studio game analyst for UNTV Cup which is the first charity game dedicated for public servants and celebrities in the Philippines an original concept by Mr. Public Service Daniel Razon. He appears on the UNTV Cup Season 2 coverage during pre-game and halftime shows, in addition to special UNTV Cup events.

== Non-basketball career ==
Outside basketball, he also dabbled in acting in movies and television during the early 90s. His first movie, Last Two Minutes (1990), was a top-grosser at the box-office. The movie co-starred him with teammate Alvin Patrimonio and Bong Alvarez. It spawned a sitcom of the same title aired over PTV 4, where they co-starred with PBA legend Yoyong Martirez. The basketball trio reunited on-screen in 1993 to do Tasya Fantasya opposite Kris Aquino.

Preceded by Lawrence Chongson	UE Red Warriors men's basketball head coach 2011-2012	Succeeded by Boyzie Zamar
Preceded by Koy Banal	Arellano Chiefs men's basketball head coach 2014-2018	Succeeded by Junjie Ablan (interim basis)
