= 1995 PBA All-Star Game =

Rookies-Sophomores-Juniors	Veterans
107	112
- Date: July 23, 1995
- Venue: Cuneta Astrodome, Pasay, Metro Manila
- MVP: Vergel Meneses (Sunkist Orange Juicers)
- Network: Vintage Sports (PTV)

The 1995 PBA All-Star Game is the annual all-star weekend of the Philippine Basketball Association (PBA). The events were held on July 23, 1995 at the Cuneta Astrodome in Pasay. The first-ever PBA Fans Day took place at the Araneta Coliseum in Quezon City a week before on July 16, 1995.

== Skills Challenge Winners ==
MILO Buzzer-Beater Contest: San Miguel rookie Matthew Makalintal won the contest, edged out Boyet Fernandez of Sta.Lucia and Boybits Victoria of Sunkist.

Islacom Three-point Shootout: Joey Guanio (16 points) of Shell beat Allan Caidic (11 points) of San Miguel in the finals, other participants were Ricardo Marata (Sunkist), Dwight Lago (Pepsi), Vince Hizon (Ginebra), Jose Francisco (Sta.Lucia), Glenn Capacio (Purefoods) and Roehl Gomez (Alaska).

Lipovitan Slam Dunk Team Competition: Shell's tandem of Elmer Lago and Benjie Paras won over the Ginebra duo of Alexander Coles and Noli Locsin in the finals, finishing third is the San Miguel pair of Victor Pablo and rookie Bryant Punzalan. The unforgettable highlight in the slam dunk contest was Alexander Coles' one-hand slam after going through five (Noli Locsin and four Bellestar dancers) standing persons which brought the house down. The devastating slam earned him a perfect score.

== All-Star Game ==
=== Rosters ===
Veterans:

- Alvin Patrimonio (Purefoods)
- Jerry Codinera (Purefoods)
- Glenn Capacio (Purefoods)
- Benjie Paras (Shell)
- Ronnie Magsanoc (Shell)
- Bonel Balingit (Sunkist)
- Nelson Asaytono (Sunkist)
- Vergel Meneses (Sunkist)
- Allan Caidic (San Miguel)
- Ato Agustin (San Miguel)
- Alvin Teng (Pepsi)
- Dindo Pumaren (Pepsi)
- Bong Hawkins (Alaska)
- Coach: Norman Black (San Miguel)

Rookies/Sophomores/Juniors:

- Jun Limpot (Sta.Lucia)
- Dennis Espino (Sta.Lucia)
- Chris Jackson (Sta.Lucia)
- Jose Francisco (Sta.Lucia)
- Boybits Victoria (Sunkist)
- Kenneth Duremdes (Sunkist)
- Johnny Abarrientos (Alaska)
- Jeffrey Cariaso (Alaska)
- Dwight Lago (Pepsi)
- Rey Evangelista (Purefoods)
- Edward Joseph Feihl (Ginebra)
- Noli Locsin (Ginebra)
- Coach: Derrick Pumaren (Sunkist)

=== Game ===
Vintage

July 23

Veterans 112, Rookies-Sophomores-Juniors 107
Vergel Meneses was named the game's most valuable player.

Cuneta Astrodome, Pasay
