= Alvin Teng =

Filipino basketball player

Personal information
- Born: March 4, 1965 (age 61) Davao City, Philippines
- Listed height: 6 ft 4 in (1.93 m)
- Listed weight: 187 lb (85 kg)

Career information
- College: Arellano
- Playing career: 1986–2002
- Position: Power forward / center
- Number: 8, 10, 14, 18

Career history
- 1986–1994: Magnolia Cheese Makers/San Miguel Beermen
- 1995: Pepsi Mega Bottlers
- 1996: Sunkist Orange Bottlers
- 1997–1998: Mobiline Phone Pals
- 1999–2000: Laguna Lakers
- 2000–2001: Negros Slashers
- 2002: Alaska Aces

Career highlights
- 9× PBA champion (1987 Reinforced, 1988 Open, 1988 Reinforced, 1989 Open, 1989 All-Filipino, 1989 Reinforced, 1992 All-Filipino, 1993 Governors', 1994 All-Filipino); 5× PBA All-Star (1991–1995); PBA All-Star Game MVP (1992); PBA Most Improved Player (1988); 4× PBA Mythical Second Team (1989, 1991–1993); PBA Defensive Player of the Year (1993); 6× PBA All-Defensive Team (1989–1994)

Alvin L. Teng (born March 4, 1965) is a retired Filipino professional basketball player who spent 14 seasons in the PBA, mostly with the San Miguel Beermen.

== Collegiate career ==
A native of Davao, he was a latebloomer in basketball, having only started in 1983 while playing for the Rizal Memorial College in his hometown. After a year with the RMC, Alvin enrolled at the Harvardian University in Davao, where he also played for the school team. He soon made it to a selection of Davaoeños which participated in the PABL Founder's Cup. Thus was his first taste of commercial ball-playing in the Big City. While playing for the All-Stars, Alvin was spotted by Arellano team manager and then PABL president Peter Cayco and was promptly recruited to the Flaming Arrows' bench. After enrolling in a management course in Arellano, he played for seven months with the varsity squad before closing out the 1984 PABL season with the ITM team. Teng played for Lagerlite Beer the following year and in September 1986, he was elevated to the pros, along with Magnolia teammate Jeffrey Graves, when the SMC ballclub decided to return to the PBA after a two-conference leave.

== Professional career ==
Nicknamed Robocop, Teng is described as a player who did "all the dirty work and defended the paint", and who "loves to play physical and bang bodies underneath", in addition to being a scorer. After starting as a rookie with the Magnolia Cheese team in 1986, he developed into a power forward in the league. Alvin was the Most Improved Player in 1988 and he made it to the All-Defensive team six times. He won nine championships, including a grandslam, as part of the San Miguel Beermen squad from the late 1980s to early 1990s.

In the 1995 season, Teng was unexpectedly traded by San Miguel to Pepsi Mega for Victor Pablo when the Beermen opted to start rebuilding for the future. It was first difficult for Alvin to accept, considering he showed loyalty by staying with San Miguel a year ago despite the offer sheet from Pepsi. He moved to Sunkist the following season but return to Pepsi (now Mobiline Phone Pals) in 1997 when his former coach Norman Black was signed as the ballclub's new head coach. At Mobiline, he was used as a second-string power forward.

He left the league to join the MBA in 1999 – playing for the Laguna Lakers and the Negros Slashers. He returned to the PBA and retired after his stint with the Alaska in 2002.

== Personal life ==
Teng, with his wife Susan, has four children, namely: Alyssa, Jeric, Almira, and Jeron. He also owned a hardware store.

== Controversy ==
Teng was unceremoniously terminated by the Negros Slashers on March 16, 2001. The decision was made owing to his sub-par performance during Game 4 of the MBA Championship Series against the San Juan Knights in 2000 (he was pulled out of that game, sat on the bench, untied his shoelaces and donned his practice jersey), and for not showing up in the following game (he actually called-in sick and did not play). On July 28, 2001, he filed a complaint against the team before the Office of the Commissioner of the MBA. Subsequently, on November 6, 2001, he also filed an illegal dismissal case with the Regional Arbitration Branch No. VI of the NLRC, which the Labor Arbiter found his dismissal illegal and ordered the team to pay him Php 2,530,000 representing his unpaid salaries, separation pay and attorney's fees. When the team appealed the case to NLRC, which issued a decision on September 10, 2004, dismissing his complaint for being premature since the arbitration proceedings before the Commissioner of the MBA were still pending when he filed his complaint for illegal dismissal. He filed a motion for reconsideration, but it was denied on March 21, 2005, owing to technicality. He then filed a petition for certiorari with the Court of Appeals assailing the NLRC Decision reinstating with modification the Labor Arbiter's Decision. Then, on February 22, 2012, the first division of the Supreme Court issued a decision upholding the Labor Arbiter's earlier compensation order.

== Statistics ==
Legend
GP	Games played	MPG	Minutes per game
FG%	Field-goal percentage	3P%	3-point field-goal percentage	FT%	Free-throw percentage
RPG	Rebounds per game	APG	Assists per game	SPG	Steals per game
BPG	Blocks per game	PPG	Points per game	**Bold**	Career high

Correct as of 2002

=== Season-by-season averages ===
Year	Team	GP	MPG	FG%	3P%	FT%	RPG	APG	SPG	BPG	PPG
1986	Magnolia	11	9.09	.500	–	1.000	1.36	.09	–	.09	1.8
1987	Magnolia/San Miguel	34	16.8	.486	–	.676	3.65	.26	.02	.2	4.7
1988	San Miguel	67	17.2	.562	.000	.702	4.57	.2	.08	.67	6.4
1989	San Miguel	71	25.2	.574	.000	.717	7.8	.2	.08	.66	11.3
1990	San Miguel	51	30.0	.523	.000	.737	7.7	.7	.1	.4	11.0
1991	San Miguel	64	31.3	.568	.000	.762	8.0	.62	.4	.62	12.6
1992	San Miguel	73	27.4	.512	.250	.750	6.6	.5	.3	.8	9.7
1993	San Miguel	62	32.0	.569	.000	.741	8.1	.8	.34	.64	10.9
1994	San Miguel	52	32.3	.520	–	.698	7.1	.9	.3	.4	9.7
1995	Pepsi Mega	29	28.5	.481	–	.658	6.5	.5	.3	.72	9.7
1996	Sunkist	38	25.1	.502	.000	.754	5.6	.34	.42	.15	7.4
1997	Mobiline	42	23.2	.596	.500	.655	3.8	.8	.2	.1	8.2
1998	Mobiline	50	17.9	.453	.000	.875	3.0	.3	.3	.16	3.5
2002	Alaska	8	5.6	.250	–	.500	1.25	–	–	.1	.6
Career		652	25.3	.538	.176	.730	6.11	.5	0.23	.34	8.8

== See also ==
- Jeron Teng
- Jeric Teng
