= Nelson Asaytono =

Filipino basketball player

Personal information
- Born: January 25, 1967 (age 59) San Teodoro, Oriental Mindoro, Philippines
- Listed height: 6 ft 4 in (1.93 m)
- Listed weight: 215 lb (98 kg)

Career information
- College: UM
- PBA draft: 1989: 1st round, 2nd overall pick
- Drafted by: Purefoods Hotdogs
- Playing career: 1989–2006
- Position: Power forward
- Number: 11, 8

Career history
- 1989–1991: Purefoods Tender Juicy Hotdogs
- 1992–1996: Swift/Sunkist
- 1996–1998: San Miguel Beermen
- 1999–2001: Pop Cola 800s/Panthers
- 2002–2006: Red Bull Thunder/Barako

Career highlights
- 7× PBA champion (1990 Third, 1991 All-Filipino, 1992 Third, 1993 Commissioner's, 1995 All-Filipino, 1995 Commissioner's, 2002 Commissioner's); 3× PBA Mythical First Team (1992, 1993, 1997); 4× PBA Mythical Second Team (1994–1996, 1998); 2× PBA Best Player of the Conference (1997 All-Filipino, 1998 All-Filipino); 50 Greatest Players in PBA History (2025 selection); 10× PBA All-Star (1989–1993, 1995–1999); PBA Scoring Champion (1997); 3x PABL champion (1986 Founder's Cup, 1987 Maharlika Cup, 1988 Freedom Cup)
Medals
Men's basketball
Representing Philippines
SEA Games
Gold medal – first place	1987 Jakarta	Team

Nelson Asaytono (born January 25, 1967) is a Filipino retired professional basketball player who played for Purefoods, Swift/Sunkist/Pop Cola, San Miguel Beer, and Red Bull in the PBA during his 17-year career.

== Collegiate and amateur career ==
Asaytono played at the University of Manila under the tutelage of former pro Loreto Tolentino, his coach at UM Hawks. His first national stint was part of the RP Youth team in Manila's 9th ABC Youth Championships. He became a member of the national team that same year in 1987 under coach Joe Lipa. Asaytono also played for coach Derrick Pumaren at Magnolia Ice Cream in the PABL and won three championships.

== Professional career ==
=== Purefoods Hotdogs ===
Asaytono was drafted as the 2nd overall pick by the Purefoods Hotdogs in 1989. He played three seasons for the ball club that had most of his former national teammates: Jojo Lastimosa, Alvin Patrimonio, Jerry Codiñera, Glenn Capacio, and Dindo Pumaren. With Patrimonio as the starting forward, he mostly would come off the bench. He won two championships at Purefoods. In his final season as a Tender Juicy Hotdog in 1991, he had notable performances during the All-Filipino finals against Diet Sarsi.

=== Swift/Sunkist ===
In late 1991, Asaytono was traded by Purefoods to Swift in exchange for first-round picks in 1994 and 1995. He joined the list of PBA millionaires as he was signed to a lucrative pact by the RFM franchise. For two seasons with Swift, Asaytono made it to the mythical five selection and a decent run at the Most Valuable Player (MVP) plum. In 1993, he was second in the statistical race but would up third after the polls in a frustrated bid for the most coveted award. With Vergel Meneses' first entire season with Swift in 1994, Asaytono could only make it to the mythical second-team selection but still performed well, averaging 18.6 points and 7.2 rebounds in 65 games. In 1995, his team came close to winning a Grand Slam, winning two titles that season, but only got third place in the Governors' Cup.

After winning four championships with Swift/Sunkist, Asaytono was traded to the San Miguel Beermen, his former team in the amateurs, in April 1996 for one-time MVP Renato Agustin.

=== San Miguel Beermen ===
Asaytono's trade to San Miguel proved to be the turning point of his career. He became the go-to guy in Coach Ron Jacobs's rotation and its franchise player. In 1997, he became one of the forerunners for the MVP award, but he again came short of former teammate Alvin Patrimonio. Although he lost the MVP race, he led the league in scoring.

When the team drafted future MVP Danny Ildefonso in the 1998 season, his minutes were again reduced, but still, he led the team in scoring. He led the Beermen to the finals twice in All Filipino and Commissioner's Cup in that season but came up short on both occasions to the Alaska Milkmen. A year later, when Jong Uichico took over the coaching reins from Jacobs, he was relegated to the bench and was eventually traded to his former team, the Pop Cola 800s (together with William Antonio) for Dwight Lago, Boybits Victoria, and Nic Belasco.

=== Pop Cola, Red Bull, career milestones, and retirement ===
Asaytono's second stint Pop Cola was a forgettable one, as he started to slow down as he was still at the bench. He spent his last four seasons with the Red Bull Barako until the 2005–06 season.

On April 7, 2005, he passed Crispa great Philip Cezar for the fifth spot on the all-time scoring list after tallying 17 points on 6-of-9 shooting. Currently, he is fifth in the PBA all-time scoring list with 12,268 total points in 796 career games, behind only Ramon Fernandez, Abet Guidaben, Alvin Patrimonio, and Atoy Co.

Before retiring, he had a brief stint with the Pagadian Warriors of the National Basketball Conference (NBC). He retired in 2006.

On April 2, 2025, the PBA announced that Asaytono and 9 other players were included to the PBA 50 Greatest Players and will be formally enshrined on April 11, in time with the league's 50th anniversary.

== Statistics ==
Legend
GP	Games played	MPG	Minutes per game
FG%	Field-goal percentage	3P%	3-point field-goal percentage	FT%	Free-throw percentage
RPG	Rebounds per game	APG	Assists per game	SPG	Steals per game
BPG	Blocks per game	PPG	Points per game	**Bold**	Career high

Correct as of the 2005-06 season

=== Season-by-season averages ===
Year	Team	GP	MPG	FG%	3P%	FT%	RPG	APG	SPG	BPG	PPG
1989	Purefoods	56	19.7	0.526	0.222	0.832	4.6	0.5	0.2	0.4	11.7
1990	Purefoods	53	21.2	0.554	0.250	0.802	4.4	0.9	0.3	0.4	14.1
1991	Purefoods	54	22.8	0.554	0.143	**0.842**	5.0	1.0	0.2	0.6	15.6
1992	Swift	**69**	35.8	0.560	**0.515**	0.825	**8.2**	2.1	**0.6**	**1.2**	22.4
1993	Swift	68	35.9	0.569	0.276	0.792	7.7	**2.8**	**0.6**	0.8	19.3
1994	Swift	65	33.1	0.553	0.266	0.751	7.2	2.2	0.3	0.9	18.6
1995	Sunkist	68	26.3	**0.574**	0.222	0.801	4.5	2.0	0.3	0.4	14.0
1996	Sunkist/San Miguel	51	32.6	0.497	0.346	0.779	6.3	2.0	0.5	0.4	15.9
1997	San Miguel	61	**40.7**	0.431	0.290	0.813	7.1	2.7	0.5	0.6	**23.1**
1998	San Miguel	65	32.0	0.438	0.278	0.728	5.7	2.1	0.3	0.3	14.6
1999	San Miguel/Pop Cola	23	29.2	0.421	0.171	0.778	4.3	1.0	**0.6**	0.2	11.8
2000	Pop Cola	23	32.7	0.447	0.323	0.764	6.3	2.2	0.5	0.4	17.0
2001	Pop Cola	49	20.1	0.400	0.242	0.829	3.1	1.0	0.2	0.2	8.4
2002	Red Bull	22	9.4	0.489	0.308	0.600	1.5	0.6	0.1	0.1	3.2
2003	Red Bull	38	14.0	0.511	0.419	0.671	3.2	0.7	0.2	0.1	7.5
2004–05	Red Bull	53	16.5	0.458	0.238	0.810	3.0	0.6	0.1	0.1	7.6
2005–06	Red Bull	2	8.5	0.143	0.500	0.500	1.0	0.0	0.0	0.0	3.0
Career		820	27.5	0.512	0.284	0.794	5.5	1.6	0.3	0.5	15.0

== Personal life ==
Asaytono has a daughter, Kim Arielle.

Asaytono continued to play in exhibition games after he retired. In 2012, he participated in an exhibition match with fellow PBA legends against older NBA All-Stars. He also became a building contractor, building basketball courts and gyms.

In 2020, Asaytono suffered a heart attack. He was confined in the ICU of a hospital in General Trias, Cavite, for four days and was discharged several days later. His former teammates, rivals, and even the PBA helped pay for his hospital expenses.
