= 1996 Alaska Milkmen season =

- Head coach: Tim Cone
- General manager: Joaqui Trillo
- Owner: Wilfred Steven Uytengsu

All-Filipino Cup results
- Record: 18–10 (64.3%)
- Place: 1st
- Playoff finish: Champions (def. Purefoods TJ 4–1)

Commissioner's Cup results
- Record: 18–7 (72%)
- Place: 1st
- Playoff finish: Champions (def. Formula Shell 4–3)

Governors Cup results
- Record: 15–4 (78.9%)
- Place: 1st
- Playoff finish: Champions (def. Ginebra 4–1)

Alaska Milkmen seasons

The 1996 Alaska Milkmen season was the 11th season of the franchise in the Philippine Basketball Association (PBA).

== Notable achievements ==
The Alaska Milkmen won all three conferences in the season to become the fourth team in league history to capture the Grandslam, joining the 1976 and 1983 Crispa Redmanizers and 1989 San Miguel Beermen.

== Summary ==
During the off-season, the Milkmen lost only two players from their roster, Alejandro Araneta and Dondon Ampalayo, who both retired from active playing. The only new player in their lineup is Kevin Ramas, who was acquired from Pepsi when Alaska gave up their first-round pick in the rookie draft.

In the All-Filipino Cup, the Milkmen had a 4–3 won-loss slate in the first round of eliminations, they won six of their seven games in the second round to finish on top of the standings with 10 wins and four losses. Alaska lost their first four outings in the semifinals but bounces back to win three of their last four assignments and defeated Ginebra San Miguel in a playoff match, 96–83 on May 14, for the right to meet Cone's former assistant Chot Reyes and Alvin Patrimonio led-Purefoods Tender Juicy Hotdogs in the All-Filipino finals. The Alaska Milkmen won the series, four games to one, for their second straight championship and fourth overall. The Milkmen becomes the 9th team to win the All-Filipino crown.

Last year's reinforcement Derrek Hamilton, who led the Milkmen to a runner-up finish, returns as Alaska's import for the Commissioner's Cup. The Milkmen were unbeaten in six starts before losing to Formula Shell on July 12. Alaska were once again on top of the standings with eight wins and two losses and two games ahead of second placers Ginebra and Sta.Lucia, both with six wins and four losses after the elimination round. During the first round of semifinals, Import Derrek Hamilton was tested positive on traces of Marijuana on a drug test conducted by the PBA and was not allowed to play by league officials. Luckily for Alaska, they won their next game against Sta.Lucia playing without an import. The PBA suspended Hamilton and was permanently banned from playing in the league. Resident import Sean Chambers was around and replaces Hamilton and the Milkmen won their next three games and clinch the first finals seat with a come-from-behind 102–98 victory over Ginebra on August 20. Alaska battled surprise finalist Formula Shell in the best-of-seven championship series and with Shell import Kenny Redfield enjoying a height advantage over his smaller counterpart Sean Chambers, the Zoom Masters took a 2–1 series lead but the Milkmen fought back and won in seven hard-fought games, taking the deciding match, 83–77, to win their fifth PBA title.

Alaska lost three of their first four games in the Governors Cup before they rolled to a seven-game winning streak and on top of the standings anew with eight wins and three losses. The Milkmen advances in the best-of-five semifinal series outright along with Ginebra San Miguel. Their winning streak reaches to 10 games following a 3–0 sweep over Formula Shell in their semifinals duel and enters into the championship round. Alaska went on to play crowd-favorite Ginebra San Miguel in the Governors Cup finals. The Milkmen were up three games to none and on a threshold of a four-game sweep. Ginebra decided to change their import Fred Cofield in favor of Derek Rucker in a hope of winning one game in the series. In the fourth game, the Milkmen's 13-game winning run was halted when Ginebra prevailed by one point, 97–96. Alaska came back to win Game five, 91–83, and makes history by becoming the fourth team to win the coveted Grandslam.

== Awards ==
- Johnny Abarrientos was named the season's Most Valuable Player (MVP).
- Sean Chambers won the Governor's Cup Best Import honor.
- Edward Juinio was the season's Most Improved Player.
- Bong Hawkins (Commissioner's Cup Best Player of the Conference and Finals MVP) and Jojo Lastimosa (All-Filipino Cup Finals MVP), along with MVP winner Abarrientos (Governor's Cup Finals MVP), were chosen in the Mythical first team selection, while Jeffrey Cariaso was chosen in the Mythical second team selection.
- Cariaso and Abarrientos were chosen in the Defensive team selection.
- Gilbert "Jun" Reyes Jr. was given the Mr. Quality Minutes award.
- Tim Cone was named the Coach of the Year.

== Roster ==
1996 Alaska Milkmen roster
Players

Pos.	#	POB	Name	Height	Weight	DOB (YYYY–MM–DD)	From
G/F	4	(Philippines)	Merwin Castelo	6 ft 2 in (1.88 m)	186 lb (84 kg)		San Beda
G	5	(Philippines)	Gilbert Reyes	5 ft 8 in (1.73 m)	160 lb (73 kg)		Ateneo
G/F	6	(Philippines)	Jojo Lastimosa	6 ft 1 in (1.85 m)	180 lb (82 kg)		USJ–R
G	7	(Philippines)	Roehl Gomez	6 ft 0 in (1.83 m)	180 lb (82 kg)		Cebu
C	12	(Philippines)	Dickie Bachmann	6 ft 5 in (1.96 m)	200 lb (91 kg)		De La Salle
G	14	(Philippines)	Johnny Abarrientos	5 ft 8 in (1.73 m)	150 lb (68 kg)		Far Eastern
F	16	(Philippines)	Bong Hawkins	6 ft 3 in (1.91 m)	220 lb (100 kg)		UPHSD
C	17	(Philippines)	Kevin Ramas	6 ft 4 in (1.93 m)	240 lb (109 kg)		Mapúa
G/F	22	(Philippines)	Jeffrey Cariaso	6 ft 2 in (1.88 m)	190 lb (86 kg)		Sonoma State
C	24	(Philippines)	Cris Bolado	6 ft 7 in (2.01 m)	260 lb (118 kg)		National-U
F/C	31	(Philippines)	Giovanni Pineda	6 ft 6 in (1.98 m)	190 lb (86 kg)		Adamson
C	32	(Philippines)	Poch Juinio	6 ft 5 in (1.96 m)	215 lb (98 kg)		Philippines

Coaches
Head coach
- (United States) Tim Cone
Assistant(s)
- (Philippines) Joel Banal
- (Philippines) Aric del Rosario

Legend
- (DP) Unsigned draft pick
- (FA) Free agent
- (S) Suspended
- Injured

== Transactions ==
=== Additions ===
Name	Deal Information	Former team
Kevin Ramas	Alaska gave up their first-round pick in exchange	Pepsi

=== Recruited imports ===
Tournament	Name	Number	Position	University/College	Duration
Commissioner's Cup	Derrick Hamilton	3	Forward-Center	Southern Miss	June 16 to August 9
Commissioner's Cup; Governors Cup	Sean Chambers	20	Forward	Cal Poly San Luis Obispo	August 13-September 10; September 29-December 17
