= Kevin Ramas =

Filipino basketball player

Personal information
- Born: October 30, 1967 (age 58)
- Listed height: 6 ft 6 in (1.98 m)

Career information
- College: Mapúa
- PBA draft: 1992: 1st round, 4th overall pick
- Drafted by: Purefoods Tender Juicy Hotdogs
- Playing career: 1992–2001
- Position: Center

Career history
- 1992–1993: Purefoods Tender Juicy Hotdogs
- 1994: San Miguel Beermen
- 1995: Pepsi Mega
- 1996–2001: Alaska Milkmen

Career highlights
- 9x PBA champion (1993 All-Filipino, 1994 All-Filipino, 1996 All-Filipino, 1996 Commissioner's, 1996 Governors', 1997 Governors', 1998 All-Filipino, 1998 Commissioner's, 2001 All-Filipino); NCAA Philippines champion (1990)

Fermin Alberto Ramas, better known as Kevin Ramas (born October 30, 1967) is a former PBA player. In a career lasting 10 years, he has played for the Purefoods Tender Juicy Hotdogs, San Miguel Beermen, Pepsi Mega Bottlers and the Alaska Milkmen.

Ramas played for the Mapua Cardinals in the NCAA where he was part of the senior's championship conquest in 1990. He also played for Crispa 400 in the Philippine Basketball League. In 1992, Ramas entered the PBA draft and was picked fourth overall in the first round by Purefoods.

After two seasons with the Hotdogs, Ramas found himself being traded for the next two years, first with the Beermen whom he was dealt for Bong Ravena, the following year, the Beermen gave him up along with Alvin Teng in a trade with Pepsi Mega for Victor Pablo and Gido Babilonia.

Kevin found a home with the Alaska Milkmen where he was part of the Grand Slam team in 1996 and multiple championships after with the Milkmen.

== College and amateur career ==
Ramas was a key factor in helping the Mapua Cardinals win the NCAA championship in 1990. He would graduate after winning the championship.

Before moving to the PBA, Ramas played for Crispa 400 in the Philippine Basketball League.

== Professional career ==
=== Purefoods Tender Juicy Hotdogs ===
Ramas was selected fourth overall in the 1992 PBA draft by the Purefoods Tender Juicy Hotdogs. In 1993, Purefoods won the All-Filipino Cup.

=== San Miguel Beermen ===
Before the 1994 season, Ramas was traded to the San Miguel Beermen for Bong Ravena.

In the 1994 offseason, Pepsi Mega offered Ramas a P3.6 million, three-year deal. He instead signed with the Beermen for P100,000 per month for two years.

=== Pepsi Mega ===
San Miguel then traded him for Victor Pablo and Gido Babilonia in 1995.

=== Alaska Aces ===
In 1996, Alaska traded its first round pick in that year's draft for Ramas. That season, Alaska won the All-Filipino Cup, its first ever. They then made it to the Commissioner's Cup finals against the Formula Shell Zoom Masters, but in Game 6, he couldn't grab a crucial rebound in the final minutes of the game, leading to a game-winner from Richie Ticzon. Alaska was able to win in Game 7, and win the Commissioner's Cup for the season. Alaska then closed out the season with a Governors' Cup title, accomplishing the third grand slam in PBA history. He had a chance to replicate this feat with Alaska once again in 1998, as they won the first two conferences, but Alaska failed to make the semifinals of the Governors' Cup.

== PBA career statistics ==
Legend
GP	Games played	MPG	Minutes per game
FG%	Field-goal percentage	3P%	3-point field-goal percentage	FT%	Free-throw percentage
RPG	Rebounds per game	APG	Assists per game	SPG	Steals per game
BPG	Blocks per game	PPG	Points per game	**Bold**	Career high

=== Season-by-season averages ===
Year	Team	GP	MPG	FG%	3P%	FT%	RPG	APG	SPG	BPG	PPG
1992	Purefoods	55	16.2	.477	.000	.623	4.2	.3	**.1**	**.8**	**5.1**
1993	Purefoods	54	9.2	.478	.000	.619	2.4	.3	**.1**	.3	2.7
1994	San Miguel	46	16.1	.446	.000	.559	3.8	.3	**.1**	.6	3.3
1995	Pepsi Mega	25	**23.3**	.396	.000	.500	**6.6**	.4	**.1**	**.8**	3.4
1996	Alaska	**70**	14.1	.495	.000	.558	3.2	.2	**.1**	.4	3.0
1997	Alaska	54	14.0	**.511**	.000	.553	2.5	.3	**.1**	.3	2.0
1998	Alaska	55	18.5	.472	.000	.800	3.3	**.7**	**.1**	.3	3.1
1999	Alaska	13	7.7	.286	.000	**1.000**	.7	.1	.0	.1	.8
2000	Alaska	31	6.9	.421	.000	.500	1.1	.4	**.1**	.1	1.1
2001	Alaska	6	3.7	.000	.000	.500	.8	.2	.0	.0	.5
Career		409	14.2	.465	.000	.608	3.1	.3	.1	.4	2.9

== Coaching career ==
After retiring, Ramas became the coach of the PCU Dolphins in the NCAA.

== National team career ==
In 1994, Ramas got to prepare with the Philippine men's national team for the 1994 Asian Games as an injury replacement for E.J. Feihl. He did not make the final roster.

== Personal life ==
He was nicknamed "Kevin" since his build and shoulders in his early years resembled that of NBA legend Kevin McHale.

In 1999, Ramas got involved in a fistfight at a bar. He was summoned by Jun Bernardino and given a reprimand.
