= 1996 PBA Governors' Cup finals =

Basketball tournament

1996 PBA Governors Cup finals
Team	Coach	Wins
Alaska Milkmen	Tim Cone	4
Ginebra San Miguel	Robert Jaworski	1
- Dates: December 8–17, 1996
- MVP: Johnny Abarrientos
- Television: Vintage Sports (IBC)
- Radio network: DZRH

PBA Governors Cup finals chronology
- < 1995 1997 >

PBA finals chronology
- < 1996 Commissioner's 1997 All-Filipino >

The 1996 PBA Governors Cup finals was the best-of-7 basketball championship series of the 1996 PBA Governors Cup, and the conclusion of the conference's playoffs. The Alaska Milkmen and Ginebra San Miguel played for the 65th championship contested by the league.

The Alaska Milkmen captured the coveted grandslam, winning their finals series over Ginebra San Miguel, 4 games to 1.

Johnny Abarrientos won on his first PBA finals MVP in Governors Cup finals.

== Qualification ==
Alaska		Ginebra
Finished 8–3 (.727), 1st	Eliminations	Finished 7–4 (.636), 2nd
Qualified outright	Quarterfinals	Qualified outright
defeated Formula Shell, 3–0	Best-of-5 semifinals	defeated San Miguel, 3–1

== Series scoring summary ==
Team	Game 1	Game 2	Game 3	Game 4	Game 5	Wins
Alaska	90	110	95	96	91	4
Ginebra	79	105	82	97	83	1
Venue	Cuneta	Cuneta	Araneta	Cuneta	Cuneta

== Games summary ==
=== Game 1 ===
Vintage

December 8

Alaska Milkmen 90, Ginebra San Miguel 79
Alaska leads series, 1–0

Cuneta Astrodome, Pasay

The Ginebras fumbled despite taking small leads in the first three quarters, the Gins had 27 turnovers compared to the Milkmen's 15, those turnovers keyed Alaska's fourth quarter run that limited Ginebra to a low output.

=== Game 2 ===
Vintage

December 10

Alaska Milkmen 110, Ginebra San Miguel 105
Alaska leads series, 2–0

Cuneta Astrodome, Pasay

The Milkmen led 104–91 with 3:40 to go, the Gins tried to rally with Fred Cofield hitting a triple to spark a 12–2 run and pulled Ginebra up close, 103–106, time down to 45.6 seconds.

=== Game 3 ===
Vintage

December 13

Alaska Milkmen 95, Ginebra San Miguel 82
Alaska leads series, 3–0

Araneta Coliseum, Quezon City

Alaska broke the game wide open with an 82–66 lead in the final quarter. Ginebra shot a dismal 33 percent from the floor.

=== Game 4 ===
Vintage

December 15

Alaska Milkmen 96, Ginebra San Miguel 97
Alaska leads series, 3–1

Cuneta Astrodome, Pasay

New Ginebra import Derrick Rucker banked in the marginal basket with 29.7 seconds to go, after Jojo Lastimosa's short jumper drew Alaska to within 97–96, with 14.2 seconds left, Rucker's inbound pass was intercepted by Poch Juinio but the Milkmen failed to get a shot on time.

=== Game 5 ===
Vintage

December 17

Alaska Milkmen 91, Ginebra San Miguel 83
Pts: Jojo Lastimosa 22, Sean Chambers 21	Pts: Derek Rucker 34
Alaska wins series, 4–1

Cuneta Astrodome, Pasay

Johnny Abarrientos engineered a searing 11–0 blast from a 62–69 deficit to a 73–69 lead for Alaska at the end of the third quarter. Abarrientos' jumper gave the Milkmen an 89–82 lead going into the last two minutes of the final period Then Johnny Abarrientos on his first Finals MVP and Alaska captures on his 3 peat grand slam champion 6th title.

1996 PBA Governors Cup Champions

Alaska Milkmen
Sixth title

== Rosters ==
Alaska Milkmen roster
Players
Coaches

Pos.	#	POB	Name	Height	Weight	DOB (YYYY–MM–DD)	From
G/F	4	(Philippines)	Merwin Castelo	6 ft 2 in (1.88 m)			San Beda
G	5	(Philippines)	Gilbert Reyes	5 ft 8 in (1.73 m)			Ateneo
G/F	6	(Philippines)	Jojo Lastimosa	6 ft 1 in (1.85 m)			USJ–R
G	7	(Philippines)	Roehl Gomez	6 ft 0 in (1.83 m)			Cebu
C	12	(Philippines)	Dickie Bachmann	6 ft 5 in (1.96 m)			De La Salle
G	14	(Philippines)	Johnny Abarrientos	5 ft 8 in (1.73 m)			Far Eastern
F	16	(Philippines)	Bong Hawkins	6 ft 3 in (1.91 m)			UPHSD
C	17	(Philippines)	Kevin Ramas	6 ft 4 in (1.93 m)			Mapúa
F	20	(United States)	Sean Chambers (I)	6 ft 1 in (1.85 m)			Cal Poly
G/F	22	(Philippines)	Jeffrey Cariaso	6 ft 2 in (1.88 m)			Sonoma State
C	24	(Philippines)	Cris Bolado	6 ft 7 in (2.01 m)			National-U
F/C	31	(Philippines)	Giovanni Pineda	6 ft 6 in (1.98 m)			Adamson
C	32	(Philippines)	Poch Juinio	6 ft 5 in (1.96 m)			Philippines

Head coach

- (United States) Tim Cone

Assistant coach(es)

- (Philippines) Joel Banal
- (Philippines) Aric del Rosario

Legend

- (C) Team captain
- (CI) Commissioner's Cup Import
- (GI) Governors' Cup Import
- (EI) EASL Import
- (DP) Unsigned draft pick
- (FA) Free agent
- (IN) Inactive
- (S) Suspended
- (R) Rookie
- (I) Import
- Injured

Ginebra San Miguel roster
Players
Coaches

Pos.	#	POB	Name	Height	Weight	DOB (YYYY–MM–DD)	From
G	1	(Philippines)	Bal David	5 ft 9 in (1.75 m)			UST
G	3	(United States)	Derek Rucker (I)	6 ft 0 in (1.83 m)			Davidson
F	6	(Philippines)	Noli Locsin	6 ft 3 in (1.91 m)			De La Salle
G	7	(Philippines)	Robert Jaworski	6 ft 0 in (1.83 m)			UE
F	9	(Philippines)	Macky De Joya	6 ft 3 in (1.91 m)			San Beda
G/F	11	(Philippines)	Jayvee Gayoso	6 ft 2 in (1.88 m)			Ateneo
G	12	(Philippines)	Vince Hizon	6 ft 2 in (1.88 m)			Ateneo
C	13	(Philippines)	Marlou Aquino	6 ft 9 in (2.06 m)			Adamson
G	15	(Philippines)	Michael Orquillas	6 ft 2 in (1.88 m)			Cebu
F	16	(Philippines)	Benny Cheng	6 ft 3 in (1.91 m)			Mapúa
F/C	18	(Philippines)	Wilmer Ong	6 ft 4 in (1.93 m)			USLS
G	25	(Philippines)	Pido Jarencio	5 ft 10 in (1.78 m)			UST
G	33	(United States)	Fred Cofield (I)	6 ft 3 in (1.91 m)			Eastern Michigan
C	34	(Philippines)	EJ Feihl	7 ft 0 in (2.13 m)			Adamson
G	52	(Philippines)	Robert Jaworski, Jr.	6 ft 2 in (1.88 m)			Ateneo

Head coach

- (Philippines) Robert Jaworski

Assistant coach(es)

- (Philippines) Rino Salazar
- (Philippines) Philip Cezar

Legend

- (C) Team captain
- (CI) Commissioner's Cup Import
- (GI) Governors' Cup Import
- (EI) EASL Import
- (DP) Unsigned draft pick
- (FA) Free agent
- (IN) Inactive
- (S) Suspended
- (R) Rookie
- (I) Import
- Injured

== Broadcast notes ==
Game	Play-by-play	Analyst
Game 1	Noli Eala	Quinito Henson
Game 2	Ed Picson	Quinito Henson
Game 3	Chino Trinidad	Yeng Guiao
Game 4	Noli Eala	Andy Jao
Game 5	Ed Picson	Quinito Henson
