= 1996 PBA All-Filipino Cup =

First conference of the 1996 PBA season

- Duration: February 18 - May 26, 1996
- TV partner(s): Vintage Sports (IBC)

Finals
- Champions: Alaska Milkmen
- Runners-up: Purefoods TJ Hotdogs

Awards
- Best Player: Alvin Patrimonio (Purefoods TJ Hotdogs)
- Finals MVP: Jojo Lastimosa (Alaska Milkmen)

PBA All-Filipino Cup chronology
- < 1995 1997 >

PBA conference chronology
- < 1995 Governors' 1996 Commissioner's >

The 1996 Philippine Basketball Association (PBA) All-Filipino Cup was the first conference of the 1996 PBA season. It started on February 18 and ended on May 26, 1996. The tournament is an All-Filipino format, which doesn't require an import or a pure-foreign player for each team.

== Format ==
The following format will be observed for the duration of the conference:

- Double-round robin eliminations; 14 games per team; Teams are then seeded by basis on win–loss records.
- The top five teams after the eliminations will advance to the semifinals.
- Semifinals will be two round robin affairs with the remaining five teams. Results from the eliminations will be carried over. A playoff incentive for a finals berth will be given to the team that will win at least five of their eight semifinal games.
- The top two teams (or the top team and the winner of the playoff incentive) will face each other in a best-of-seven championship series. The next two teams (or the loser of the playoff incentive and the fourth seeded team) dispute the third-place trophy in a one-game playoff.

== Elimination round ==
=== Team standings ===
Pos	Team	W	L	PCT	GB	Qualification
1	Alaska Milkmen	10	4	.714	—	Semifinal round
2	Formula Shell Zoom Masters	9	5	.643	1	Semifinal round
3	Purefoods Tender Juicy Hotdogs	8	6	.571	2	Semifinal round
4	San Miguel Beermen	8	6	.571	2	Semifinal round
5	Ginebra San Miguel	7	7	.500	3	Semifinal round
6	Sta. Lucia Realtors	6	8	.429	4	
7	Sunkist Orange Juicers	4	10	.286	6	
8	Pepsi Mega Bottlers	4	10	.286	6	

== Semifinal round ==
=== Team standings ===
Overall standings
Pos	Team	W	L	PCT	GB	Qualification
1	Purefoods Tender Juicy Hotdogs	14	8	.636	—	Advance to the finals (Note: If a team outside the top two teams wins at least five semifinal round games, then it and the second-placed team will playoff for the last finals berth; otherwise, the top 2 teams qualify outright.)
2	Alaska Milkmen	13	9	.591	1	Guaranteed finals berth playoff
3	Ginebra San Miguel	12	10	.545 (Note: Head-to-head record: Ginebra 3–1 San Miguel)	2	Qualify to finals berth playoff
4	San Miguel Beermen	12	10	.545	2	Proceed to third place playoff
5	Formula Shell Zoom Masters	11	11	.500	3	

Notes:

Semifinal round standings
Pos	Team	W	L	Qualification
1	Purefoods Tender Juicy Hotdogs	6	2	
2	Ginebra San Miguel	5	3	Qualify to finals berth playoff (Note: Purefoods qualified outright as #1 seeded team; finals berth playoff: Alaska 96–83 Ginebra)
3	San Miguel Beermen	4	4	
4	Alaska Milkmen	3	5	
5	Formula Shell Zoom Masters	2	6	

== Finals berth playoff ==
Vintage

May 14

recap

Alaska Milkmen 96, Ginebra San Miguel 83

Cuneta Astrodome, Pasay

== Third place playoff ==
Vintage

May 17

Ginebra San Miguel 99, San Miguel Beermen 100

Cuneta Astrodome, Pasay

== Finals ==
Vintage

May 17

Purefoods TJ Hotdogs 77, Alaska Milkmen 78

Cuneta Astrodome, Pasay

Vintage

May 19

Purefoods TJ Hotdogs 79, Alaska Milkmen 86

Cuneta Astrodome, Pasay

Vintage

May 21

Purefoods TJ Hotdogs 99, Alaska Milkmen 87

Araneta Coliseum, Quezon City

Vintage

May 24

Purefoods TJ Hotdogs 62, Alaska Milkmen 75

Cuneta Astrodome, Pasay

Vintage

May 26

Purefoods TJ Hotdogs 92, Alaska Milkmen 93 (OT)
Alaska wins series, 4–1

Araneta Coliseum, Quezon City
