= Joaqui Trillo =

Filipino basketball coach and executive

Career information
- College: De La Salle
- Coaching career: 1978–1986

Career history

Coaching
- 1978–1986: De La Salle

Career highlights
- As executive: 14× PBA champion (1991 Third Conference, 1994 Governors', 1995 Governors', 1996 All-Filipino, 1996 Commissioner's, 1996 Governors', 1997 Governors' 1998 All-Filipino, 1998 Commissioner's, 2000 All-Filipino, 2003 Invitational, 2007 Fiesta, 2010 Fiesta, 2013 Commissioner's); Grand Slam champion (1996)

Joaquin "Joaqui" Llamas Trillo is a Filipino former basketball coach and executive formerly served on Alaska Aces.

== Career ==
=== Early career ===
Trillo played for La Salle under Tito Eduque. He coached the team from 1978 (they are still in NCAA) until 1986.

=== Alaska ===
In 1990, Fred Uytengsu hired Trillo as the manager of Alaska Air Force. Together with Tim Cone, they won multiple championship, including a Grand Slam in 1996. After Cone left Alaska, Trillo was promoted as Governor of the team in 2012 until 2014.

=== Other ===
Aside from sports, he also delved into show business. He appeared in Nescafé and Maggi commercials and was invited as a guest for two consecutive weeks on ‘Home Along Da Riles’. He also served as a color commentator on PBA on Vintage Sports 1984 to 1989, and on UAAP on Silverstar Sports in late 1990s.

== Personal life ==
Trillo married Imelda Crisostomo. The couple have children named: Luigi, the coach of Meralco Bolts; Paolo, also in Meralco as its manager, Cheska, and Carlo.
