= Kenny Redfield =

American retired basketball player (born 1968)

Personal information
- Born: August 12, 1968 (age 58) Chicago, Illinois, U.S.
- Listed height: 6 ft 6 in (1.98 m)
- Listed weight: 210 lb (95 kg)

Career information
- College: Michigan State
- NBA draft: 1990: undrafted
- Playing career: 1990–1998
- Position: Forward
- Number: 3

Career history
- 1990–1991: Sioux Falls Skyforce
- 1992–1993: 7-Up
- 1994–1995: Purefoods Tender Juicy Hotdogs
- 1996: Formula Shell Zoom Masters
- 1997: Sta. Lucia Realtors
- 1998: Purefoods Tender Juicy Hotdogs

Career highlights
- As player: PBA champion (1994 Commissioner's); 2× PBA Best Import (1994 Commissioner's, 1996 Commissioner's); CBA All-Rookie Team (1991); Big Ten Defensive Player of the Year (1990)

Kenny Redfield is an American retired professional basketball player, best known for playing for professional basketball teams in the Philippine Basketball Association from 1992 to 1998.

== Early career ==
Redfield played for Michigan State Spartans, and won a Defensive Player of the Year in the Big Ten in 1990. He also played in the Continental Basketball Association (CBA) where he was selected to the All-Rookie Team in 1991.

== Professional basketball career ==
=== Pepsi ===
Redfield started his playing career at PBA on Pepsi team, but only played shortly. He returned to the team for the First Conference, under its new name 7-Up.

=== Purefoods ===
Redfield played for Purefoods under Chot Reyes. He led the team to a championship in 1994 PBA Commissioner's Cup. In the same conference, he got his first Best Import of the Conference Award.

=== Formula Shell ===
In 1996, Redfield played for Formula Shell under Chito Narvasa, with its stars was the duo of Benjie Paras and Ronnie Magsanoc, with shooters like Jojo Lim and Richie Ticzon. In a notable game vs Ginebra, Redfield shot a 3-point buzzer-beater after a Benjie Paras block with a fast break pass to him. He led the team to the finals, but lost to Tim Cone-coached Alaska Milkmen led by Jojo Lastimosa and Johnny Abarrientos in seven-games series. Even though they lost, in that conference, Redfield won his second Best Import of the Conference Award.

=== Sta. Lucia ===
Redfield played for Sta. Lucia Realtors and reunited with Reyes.

=== Return to Purefoods ===
Redfield reunited with Narvasa at his return to Purefoods, but only played for three games.

== PBA career statistics ==
Legend
GP	Games played	MPG	Minutes per game
FG%	Field-goal percentage	3P%	3-point field-goal percentage	FT%	Free-throw percentage
RPG	Rebounds per game	APG	Assists per game	SPG	Steals per game
BPG	Blocks per game	PPG	Points per game	**Bold**	Career high

=== Season-by-season averages ===
Year	Team	GP	RPG	APG	SPG	BPG	PPG
1992	Pepsi	5	17.0	6.6	0.6	2.0	**42.4**
1993	7-Up	29	15.8	10.8	1.5	**2.1**	31.6
1994	Purefoods	24	11.6	6.5	1.4	1.9	29.2
1995	Purefoods	17	11.9	7.6	2.0	1.5	26.1
1996	Formula Shell	26	12.1	6.8	1.3	1.1	25.6
1997	Sta. Lucia	19	11.9	7.2	1.4	1.1	22.5
1998	Purefoods	3	9.0	9.3	2.7	1.0	16.0
Career		123	13.0	8.0	1.5	1.6	27.7
