= Bong Hawkins =

Filipino basketball player

Personal information
- Born: November 6, 1967 (age 59)
- Listed height: 6 ft 4 in (1.93 m)
- Listed weight: 215 lb (98 kg)

Career information
- College: Perpetual
- PBA draft: 1991: 1st round, 2nd overall pick
- Drafted by: Presto Tivoli
- Playing career: 1991–2006
- Position: Forward
- Number: 16

Career history

Playing
- 1991–1992: Presto Tivoli
- 1993: Sta. Lucia Realtors
- 1993–2000: Alaska Milkmen
- 2001: Tanduay Rhum Masters
- 2003–2005: Coca-Cola Tigers
- 2005–2006: Alaska Aces

Coaching
- 2009–2010: Alaska Aces (assistant)

Career highlights
- As player: 8× PBA champion (1995 Governors', 1996 All-Filipino, 1996 Commissioner's, 1996 Governors', 1997 Governors', 1998 All-Filipino, 1998 Commissioner's, 2002 All-Filipino, 2003 Reinforced); 3x PBA All-Star (1994–1996); PBA Most Improved Player (1994); PBA All-Defensive team (1994); 2x PBA Mythical Second team (1994, 2000); 2x PBA Mythical First team (1995, 1996); PBA Finals Most Valuable Player (1996 Commissioner's); 50 Greatest Players in PBA History (2025 selection); No. 16 retired by the Alaska Aces; No. 12 retired by the Perpetual Altas; As assistant coach: PBA champion (2010 Fiesta)

Rene "Bong" Hawkins Jr. (born November 6, 1967) is a Filipino retired professional basketball player of the Philippine Basketball Association (PBA). Nicknamed as "The Hawk", he is the son of character actor Rene Hawkins, Sr.

== Collegiate career ==
Hawkins played for the Perpetual Altas in the basketball championships of the National Collegiate Athletic Association (NCAA) in the late 1980s. Perpetual reached their first ever NCAA finals in 1989 losing to eventual champions San Sebastian Stags. His no. 12 jersey was later retired in February 2026.

== Professional career ==
=== Presto and Sta.Lucia ===
Bong was drafted as the second overall pick in the 1991 PBA draft. The former Perpetual Help cager was chosen by Presto coach Jimmy Mariano when the Tivolis traded Manny Victorino to Pepsi. Hawkins twisted his knee during practice and was forced to sit out in the entire first conference. He finally debuted in Tivoli Milk uniform in the All-Filipino Conference.

In 1993, he was absorbed by newcomer Sta. Lucia Realtors, which took over the disbanded Presto franchise. Bong played one conference as a Realtor before being traded to Alaska Milkmen for Paul Alvarez beginning the 1993 PBA Commissioner's Cup.

=== Alaska Milkmen ===
In his first full season with Alaska in 1994, Hawkins led his team in both scoring and rebounding as he was the hands down choice for the league's Most Improved Player award. He became an integral part of Alaska's success starting the mid-1990s, alongside Jojo Lastimosa, Johnny Abarrientos, Poch Juinio and import Sean Chambers.

In 1996, the Milkmen became the fourth team to win the PBA Grandslam and Hawkins was named to the Mythical Five for the second straight season. The 'Hawk' won nine championships with Alaska until the 2000 PBA season.

=== FedEx Express Controversy ===
He moved to Tanduay Rhum Masters in the 2001 season in exchange for a draft pick. When the ballclub disbanded at the end of the year, he was among the players absorbed by its buyer, the FedEx Express. However, he and the management had a feud. He wanted to have the same terms of salary that he had with the Masters while the Express based their contract on written ones. As a result, he was released and left unsigned in 2003.

=== Coca-Cola Tigers ===
In 2003, he was signed by the Coca-Cola Tigers where he was re-united with former teammates Jeffrey Cariaso, Johnny Abarrientos and Poch Juinio. He would go to win another championship with the then-San Miguel owned franchise and suited up for them until the early beginning of the 2004-05 PBA Philippine Cup.

=== Return to Alaska ===
Hawkins was signed as a free agent during the 2004-05 PBA Philippine Cup reuniting him with head coach Tim Cone. Jeffrey Cariaso, who was traded later to Alaska in the middle of the conference, also reunited with them. Despite showing signs of slowing down and playing with limited minutes, Hawkins still contributed his play-making skills with the young Alaska squad. He last played during the 3rd-Place game of the 2006 PBA Philippine Cup against San Miguel.

== Retirement and post-basketball career ==
After the 2005-06 PBA season, Hawkins retired and worked for Tim Cone as one of his assistant coaches. During the 25th anniversary of Alaska on September 27, 2010, his number 16 was retired along with Johnny's number 14. He was snubbed from the PBA's 40 Greatest Players list.

Hawkins was invited to be on the coaching staff for the University of the Philippines Fighting Maroons Men's Basketball Team.

Hawkins also played in exhibition games after retiring, including one in Saudi in 2012, one against a selection of former NBA stars that same year, and one with former and current Alaska, Purefoods, and Ginebra players in 2015.

== PBA career statistics ==
Legend
GP	Games played	MPG	Minutes per game
FG%	Field-goal percentage	3P%	3-point field-goal percentage	FT%	Free-throw percentage
RPG	Rebounds per game	APG	Assists per game	SPG	Steals per game
BPG	Blocks per game	PPG	Points per game	**Bold**	Career high

Year	Team	GP	MPG	FG%	3P%	FT%	RPG	APG	SPG	BPG	PPG
1991	Tivoli	37	23.0	.529	.000	.802	4.8	1.2	.6	.7	12.2
1992	Presto	25	24.9	.520	.235	.720	4.8	1.9	.5	**.8**	12.4
1993	Sta Lucia	21	32.4	.482	.250	.667	7.5	2.8	.7	**.8**	15.2
1993	Alaska	28	35.7	**.530**	.000	.798	8.0	1.9	.8	.4	14.9
1994	Alaska	**73**	37.4	.488	.269	.772	7.8	2.5	.6	.6	16.0
1995	Alaska	**73**	39.9	.485	.294	.774	8.2	2.9	.9	.6	**18.2**
1996	Alaska	67	38.7	.455	**.304**	.716	**8.8**	3.4	1.1	.0	15.3
1997	Alaska	52	39.9	.444	.185	.793	7.9	3.8	1.0	.5	15.7
1998	Alaska	33	**40.4**	.428	.125	.750	8.1	**4.4**	**1.4**	.5	13.6
1999	Alaska	46	35.2	.432	.200	.686	5.8	3.7	1.0	.3	11.3
2000	Alaska	49	36.4	.445	.288	.761	6.5	3.5	1.1	.3	14.2
2001	Tanduay	26	33.6	.386	.273	.787	6.6	2.5	.9	.5	12.0
2003	Coca-Cola	15	10.1	.500	.333	.545	2.1	1.4	.5	.1	3.6
2004-05	Coca-Cola	62	18.1	.381	.273	**.813**	3.4	1.9	.5	.1	5.8
2004-05	Alaska	62	18.1	.381	.273	**.813**	3.4	1.9	.5	.1	5.8
Career		607	33.5	.461	.264	.759	6.8	2.8	.8	.4	13.6
