= 1996 PBA Commissioner's Cup finals =

Team	Coach	Wins
Alaska Milkmen	Tim Cone	4
Formula Shell Zoom Masters	Chito Narvasa	3
- Dates: August 27 – September 10, 1996
- MVP: Bong Hawkins
- Television: Vintage Sports (IBC)
- Radio network: DZRH

PBA Commissioner's Cup finals chronology
- < 1995 1997 >

PBA finals chronology
- < 1996 All-Filipino 1996 Governors' >

The 1996 PBA Commissioner's Cup finals was the best-of-7 series basketball championship of the 1996 PBA Commissioner's Cup, and the conclusion of the conference's playoffs. The Alaska Milkmen and Formula Shell Zoom Masters played for the 64th championship contested by the league.

The Alaska Milkmen won against the Formula Shell Zoom Masters in a seven-game series, winning their second championship for the season.

== Qualification ==
Alaska		Formula Shell
Finished 8–2 (.800), 1st	Eliminations	Finished 5–5 (.500), tied for 3rd
Finished 14–4 (.778), 1st	Semifinals	Finished 10–8 (.556), 3rd
Finished 14–4 (.778), 1st	Playoff	Won against Ginebra, 89-86

== Series scoring summary ==
Team	Game 1	Game 2	Game 3	Game 4	Game 5	Game 6	Game 7	Wins
Alaska	82	93	77	79	70	85	83	4
Shell	85	86	85	76	63	88	77	3
Venue	Cuneta	Araneta	Cuneta	Cuneta	Araneta	Cuneta	Cuneta

== Games summary ==
=== Game 1 ===
Vintage

August 27
7:30 pm

recap

Alaska Milkmen 82, Formula Shell 85
Shell leads series, 1-0

Cuneta Astrodome, Pasay

Shell trailed by 14 points, 48–62, when Ken Redfield and Jolly Escobar teamed up as the Gas kings pulled even at 70-all at the start of the final period. Benjie Paras' jumper gave Shell a 78–76 lead but Jojo Lastimosa knocked in a booming triple to give the advantage back to Alaska, the lead change hands two more times before Paras and Peter Naron combined for five straight points for an 85-81 cushion going into the final two minutes, Lastimosa converted on a technical free throw to cut the deficit down, the Milkmen had the opportunity when Ken Redfield fouled out with 39.6 remaining, a block by Paras on Jeffrey Cariaso with 30 seconds left signalled the doom for the Milkmen as they bungled on their next offensive play.

=== Game 2 ===
Vintage

August 30
7:00 pm

recap

Alaska Milkmen 93, Formula Shell 86
Scoring by quarter: 24-23, 26-20, 22-23, 24-20
Pts: Sean Chambers 28; Rebs: Chambers 10; Asts: Abarrientos 7	Pts: Kenny Redfield 18; Rebs: Redfield 11; Asts: Redfield 6
Series tied, 1-1

Araneta Coliseum, Quezon City

The Milkmen broke away early in the first half, the Alaska defense held Shell import Ken Redfield to just 18 points, the Gas kings clawed back to within four, 86–90, on two free throws by Redfield. Sean Chambers sealed the win with an alley-oop with 12.2 seconds left.

=== Game 3 ===
Vintage

September 1
6:00 pm

recap

Alaska Milkmen 77, Formula Shell 85
Scoring by quarter: 22-21, 17-23, 18-20, 20-21
Pts: Sean Chambers 23; Rebs: Chambers 10; Asts: Lastimosa, 3 others, 3	Pts: Kenny Redfield 35; Rebs: Redfield 19; Asts: Paras 4
Shell leads series, 2-1

Cuneta Astrodome, Pasay

Ken Redfield poured in 35 points and hit a crucial three point-shot with 56.1 seconds left, the Milkmen managed to trim down the lead to 77–80 with 2:01 to go, from a 59–70 deficit at the start of the fourth quarter.

=== Game 4 ===
Vintage

September 3
7:00 pm

recap

Alaska Milkmen 79, Formula Shell 76
Scoring by quarter: 21-16, 24-23, 11-16, 23-21
Pts: Bong Hawkins 24; Rebs: Hawkins 14; Asts: Hawkins 4	Pts: Kenny Redfield, Benjie Paras 18; Rebs: Redfield 17; Asts: Redfield 7
Series tied, 2-2

Cuneta Astrodome, Pasay

The Milkmen appeared on a verge of giving the Zoom Masters a huge 3–1 edge when it trailed 76–72 with just over a minute to go, held Shell the rest of the way with a 7-0 blast. Bong Hawkins ignited that fiery endgame run with a triple, trimming the gap to a hairline, 76–75, after an exchange of miscues, Alaska took the driver's seat as Jojo Lastimosa and Johnny Abarrientos sank two free throws each, Richie Ticzon of Shell missed a potential game-tying three-pointer in the dying seconds, allowing Alaska to escaped with a come-from-behind victory.

=== Game 5 ===
Vintage

September 6
7:00 pm

recap

Alaska Milkmen 70, Formula Shell 63
Scoring by quarter: 11-17, 16-14, 23-12, 20-20
Pts: Sean Chambers, Bong Hawkins 14; Rebs: Chambers 10; Asts: Abarrientos 5	Pts: Kenny Redfield 24; Rebs: Redfield 14; Asts: Redfield 8
Alaska leads series, 3-2

Araneta Coliseum, Quezon City

In the lowest scoring game in PBA finals history, Johnny Abarrientos' jumper with 10.9 seconds left put the game beyond recall at 68–63.

=== Game 6 ===
Vintage

September 8
6:00 pm

recap

Alaska Milkmen 85, Formula Shell 88
Scoring by quarter: 18-22, 19-20, 23-20, 25-26
Pts: Bong Hawkins 19; Rebs: Chambers 10; Asts: Hawkins 5	Pts: Kenny Redfield 21; Rebs: Redfield 8 Asts: Redfield 10
Series tied, 3-3

Cuneta Astrodome, Pasay

Alaska coach Tim Cone predicted the series will end in Game Six, for a while, the Milkmen looks headed to finish off the Zoom Masters, leading 85–79, but Shell's underrated players thwarted Alaska's bid, Richie Ticzon did an almost impossible shot to snatch the game from Alaska when the Zoom Masters regained the upper hand at 86–85. Ticzon's shot wasn't expected to go, hounded by the defenders and deep down the right side of the court, threw a prayer of a fadeaway jumper that went in, the crowd went into a frenzy as Shell celebrated after that miracle shot.

=== Game 7 ===
Vintage

September 10
7:00 pm

Alaska Milkmen 83, Formula Shell 77
Scoring by quarter: 12-16, 25-16, 19-21, 27-24
Pts: Sean Chambers 26; Rebs: Juinio 11; Asts: Chambers, Hawkins 4	Pts: Kenny Redfield 33; Rebs: Redfield 16; Asts: Redfield 6
Alaska wins series, 4-3

Cuneta Astrodome, Pasay

Jojo Lastimosa's insurance free throws with 9.6 seconds left settled the issue as the Milkmen took an 81–77 advantage, the Zoom Masters trailed by as much as 10 points, 75–65, entering the closing minutes, but a 10-0 blast anchored by best import Kenny Redfield's five points, locked the count at 75-all with 2:20 remaining, Bong Hawkins and Jojo Lastimosa provided the backbreaking jumpers giving Alaska a 79–75 lead with 1:23 to go.

1996 PBA Commissioner's Cup Champions

Alaska Milkmen
Fifth title

== Awards ==
- Finals MVP: Bong Hawkins (Alaska)
- Best Player of the Conference: Johnny Abarrientos (Alaska)
- Best Import of the Conference: Kenny Redfield (Shell)

== Rosters ==
Alaska Milkmen roster
Players

Pos.	#	POB	Name	Height	Weight	DOB (YYYY–MM–DD)	From
G/F	4	(Philippines)	Merwin Castelo	6 ft 2 in (1.88 m)	186 lb (84 kg)		San Beda
G	5	(Philippines)	Gilbert Reyes	5 ft 8 in (1.73 m)	160 lb (73 kg)		Ateneo
G/F	6	(Philippines)	Jojo Lastimosa	6 ft 1 in (1.85 m)	180 lb (82 kg)		USJ–R
G	7	(Philippines)	Roehl Gomez	6 ft 0 in (1.83 m)	180 lb (82 kg)		Cebu
F/C	12	(Philippines)	Dickie Bachmann	6 ft 5 in (1.96 m)	200 lb (91 kg)		De La Salle
G	14	(Philippines)	Johnny Abarrientos	5 ft 8 in (1.73 m)	150 lb (68 kg)		Far Eastern
F	16	(Philippines)	Bong Hawkins	6 ft 3 in (1.91 m)	220 lb (100 kg)		UPHSD
C	17	(Philippines)	Kevin Ramas	6 ft 4 in (1.93 m)	240 lb (109 kg)		Mapúa
F	20	(United States)	Sean Chambers (I)	6 ft 1 in (1.85 m)	195 lb (88 kg)		Cal Poly
G/F	22	(Philippines)	Jeffrey Cariaso	6 ft 2 in (1.88 m)	190 lb (86 kg)		Sonoma State
C	24	(Philippines)	Cris Bolado	6 ft 7 in (2.01 m)	260 lb (118 kg)		National-U
C	31	(Philippines)	Giovanni Pineda	6 ft 6 in (1.98 m)	190 lb (86 kg)		Adamson
C	32	(Philippines)	Poch Juinio	6 ft 5 in (1.96 m)	215 lb (98 kg)		Philippines

Coaches
Head coach
- (United States) Tim Cone
Assistant(s)
- (Philippines) Joel Banal
- (Philippines) Aric del Rosario

Legend
- (DP) Unsigned draft pick
- (FA) Free agent
- (S) Suspended
- (I) Import
- Injured

Formula Shell Zoom Masters roster
Players

Pos.	#	POB	Name	Height	Weight	DOB (YYYY–MM–DD)	From
G	00	(United States)	Rommel Santos	5 ft 11 in (1.80 m)	180 lb (82 kg)		Staten Island
F/C	3	(United States)	Kenny Redfield (I)	6 ft 6 in (1.98 m)	210 lb (95 kg)		Michigan State
G	5	(Philippines)	Ronnie Magsanoc (injured)	5 ft 9 in (1.75 m)	155 lb (70 kg)		Philippines
G	6	(Philippines)	Joey Guanio	6 ft 2 in (1.88 m)	185 lb (84 kg)		Philippines
F	8	(Philippines)	Jojo Lim	6 ft 3 in (1.91 m)	186 lb (84 kg)		Visayas
G	10	(Philippines)	Richie Ticzon	5 ft 8 in (1.73 m)	150 lb (68 kg)		Ateneo
F	11	(Philippines)	Peter Naron	6 ft 3 in (1.91 m)	185 lb (84 kg)		Visayas
G	12	(Philippines)	Porferio Marzan	6 ft 2 in (1.88 m)	180 lb (82 kg)		Baguio
C	14	(Philippines)	Benjie Paras	6 ft 5 in (1.96 m)	215 lb (98 kg)		Philippines
F	17	(Philippines)	Terry Saldaña	6 ft 3 in (1.91 m)	190 lb (86 kg)		Letran
G/F	20	(Philippines)	Elmer Lago	6 ft 3 in (1.91 m)	188 lb (85 kg)		De La Salle
F/C	32	(Philippines)	Jolly Escobar	6 ft 5 in (1.96 m)	200 lb (91 kg)		UE
F	33	(Philippines)	Victor Pablo	6 ft 4 in (1.93 m)	198 lb (90 kg)		Far Eastern

Coaches
Head coach
- (Philippines) Chito Narvasa
Assistant(s)
- (Philippines) Perry Ronquillo

Legend
- (DP) Unsigned draft pick
- (FA) Free agent
- (S) Suspended
- (I) Import
- Injured

== Broadcast notes ==
Game	Play-by-play	Analyst	Courtside reporters
Game 1	Sev Sarmenta	Andy Jao	Anthony Suntay and Butch Maniego
Game 2	Ed Picson	Quinito Henson	Anthony Suntay and Butch Maniego
Game 3	Noli Eala	Andy Jao	Anthony Suntay and Butch Maniego
Game 4	Sev Sarmenta	Quinito Henson	Anthony Suntay and Butch Maniego
Game 5	Ed Picson	Andy Jao	Anthony Suntay and Butch Maniego
Game 6	Sev Sarmenta	Quinito Henson	Anthony Suntay and Butch Maniego
Game 7	Ed Picson	Andy Jao	Anthony Suntay and Butch Maniego
