= Dickie Bachmann =

Filipino sports executive (born 1968 or 1969)

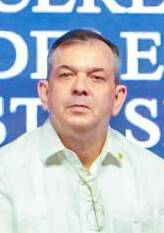
- Bachmann in 2023

12th Chairperson of the Philippine Sports Commission
- In office December 28, 2022 – July 1, 2025
- President: Bongbong Marcos
- Preceded by: Noli Eala (ad interim)
- Succeeded by: Patrick Gregorio

Personal details
- Born: 1968 or 1969 (age 57–58)
- Basketball career

Personal information
- Listed height: 6 ft 5 in (1.96 m)
- Listed weight: 300 lb (136 kg)

Career information
- College: De La Salle
- PBA draft: 1993: 1st round, 8th overall pick
- Drafted by: Alaska Milkmen
- Playing career: 1993–1999
- Position: Center
- Number: 32, 12
- Coaching career: 1998–2011

Career history

Playing
- 1993–1999: Alaska Milkmen

Coaching
- 1998: Alaska Milkmen (interim)
- 2000–2011: Alaska Aces (assistant)

Career highlights
- As player: 8× PBA champion (1994 Governors', 1995 Governors', 1996 All-Filipino, 1996 Commissioner's, 1996 Governors', 1997 Governors' 1998 All-Filipino, 1998 Commissioner's); Grand Slam champion (1996); 2× UAAP champion (1989, 1990); As assistant coach: 4× PBA champion (2000 All-Filipino, 2003 Invitational, 2007 Fiesta, 2010 Fiesta); As executive: PBA champion (2013 Commissioner's)

Richard "Dickie" Bachmann (born 1968 or 1969) is a Filipino sports executive and former basketball player who served as the chairman of the Philippine Sports Commission (PSC).

== Education ==
Bachmann attended De La Salle University from 1986 to 1991 graduating with a degree in commerce.

== Career ==
=== Playing career ===
Bachmann also played for the Green Archers, the De La Salle University's varsity team when he was in college. He was also part of the Alaska Milkmen of the Philippine Basketball Association (PBA). He joined the team in the 1993 PBA Draft at age of 25.

=== Coaching career ===
Bachmann served as an assistant for the Milkmen with Jun Reyes in 1998 to 1999 as playing assistants. In 2000, they became full-time assistants. Bachmann served as an assistant until 2012.

=== Executive career ===
He was the general manager of the defunct PBA team Alaska Aces from 2012, and concurrently Team Governor since 2014 until the team folded.

=== Sports administration ===
Bachmann was the basketball commissioner of the University Athletic Association of the Philippines (UAAP) having overseen Season 85. He was selected by host Adamson University as commissioner and was set to also oversee Season 86 prior to his appointment as PSC chairman. He is also the chairman of the Philippine Basketball Association's (PBA) 3x3 league.

=== Bongbong Marcos administration ===
Bachmann was appointed by President Bongbong Marcos as chairman of the Philippine Sports Commission (PSC) on December 28, 2022. He succeeded Noli Eala and took oath as chairman on January 4, 2023. He resigned from his other duties with the UAAP and the PBA 3x3 to fully focus on his role with the PSC. Bachmann headed the PSC until his replacement by Patrick Gregorio in 2025.

== Personal life ==
Bachmann's father is Kurt Bachmann, a former national basketball team player.
