= 1996 PBA All-Filipino Cup finals =

Basketball cup finals

Team	Coach	Wins
Alaska Milkmen	Tim Cone	4
Purefoods TJ Hotdogs	Chot Reyes	1
- Dates: May 17–26, 1996
- MVP: Jojo Lastimosa
- Television: Vintage Sports (IBC)
- Radio network: DZRH

PBA All-Filipino Cup finals chronology
- < 1995 1997 >

PBA finals chronology
- < 1995 Governors 1996 Commissioner's >

The 1996 PBA All-Filipino Cup finals was the best-of-7 series basketball championship of the 1996 PBA All-Filipino Cup, and the conclusion of the conference's playoffs. The Alaska Milkmen and Purefoods TJ Hotdogs played for the 63rd championship contested by the league.

The Alaska Milkmen won against Purefoods TJ Hotdogs, 4 games to 1, for their first ever back-to-back championships as they became the 9th team to win the All-Filipino crown.

== Qualification ==
Purefoods		Alaska
Finished 8–6 (.571), tied for 3rd	Eliminations	Finished 10–4 (.714), 1st
Finished 14–8 (.636), 1st	Semifinals	Finished 13–9 (.591), 2nd
Finished 14–8 (.636), 1st	Playoff	Won against Ginebra, 96–83

== Series scoring summary ==
Team	Game 1	Game 2	Game 3	Game 4	Game 5	Wins
Alaska	78	86	87	75	93	4
Purefoods	77	79	99	62	92	1
Venue	Cuneta	Cuneta	Araneta	Cuneta	Araneta

== Games summary ==
=== Game 1 ===
Vintage

May 17
7:30 pm

Alaska Milkmen 78, Purefoods TJ Hotdogs 77
Scoring by quarter: 23–18, 24–20, 22–15, 9–24
Pts: Jojo Lastimosa 24; Rebs: Bong Hawkins 8 Asts: Hawkins 5	Pts: Alvin Patrimonio 20; Rebs: Alvin Patrimonio 9 Asts: Patrimonio, Racela 6
Alaska leads series, 1–0

Cuneta Astrodome, Pasay

The Milkmen were apparently in control of the ballgame after having a comfortable 69–51 lead in the third quarter by having a 7–0 run. In the fourth quarter, Alaska then became scoreless for three minutes after Jun Reyes' field goal, allowing Purefoods to put together an 11–0 scoring run, reducing the lead by one point with 46.7 seconds remaining after Poch Juinio was called on illegal defense.

Purefoods also kept possession after Alvin Patrimonio's free throw but he missed a jumper that could have given his team the lead. All hope wasn't lost for Purefoods as Jojo Lastimosa split his charities from Jerry Codinera's foul with 16 seconds remaining. Rey Evangelista rebounded another Patrimonio miss and was fouled by Hawkins with 2.9 seconds left. Evangelista also split his charities allowing Alaska to escape with a one-point lead, 78–77.

Glenn Capacio of Purefoods will be suspended for Game 2 and will be fined P5000 for slapping Alaska forward Bong Hawkins during the third quarter. Capacio slapped Hawkins after he was hit in the face by Hawkins' shoulder in trying to set a pick for Jeffrey Cariaso.

=== Game 2 ===
Vintage

May 19
6:00 pm

recap

Alaska Milkmen 86, Purefoods TJ Hotdogs 79
Scoring by quarter: 13–16, 21–16, 29–21, 23–26
Pts: Jojo Lastimosa 22; Rebs: Hawkins 12; Asts: Abarrientos 6	Pts: Alvin Patrimonio 26; Rebs: Evangelista 11; Asts: Codiñera, 3 others, 4
Alaska leads series, 2–0

Cuneta Astrodome, Pasay

Jojo Lastimosa led a 17–7 burst midway through the third period, during which he hit two jumpers, a pair of free throws and a three-pointer to give Alaska its biggest lead, 59–44. Purefoods, behind Alvin Patrimonio and Olsen Racela, answered back to come to within 68–63 with nine minutes remaining, the hotdogs were then held scoreless in the next six minutes and the milkmen took advantage on an 8–0 burst to erect a 76–63 lead with still 3:26 to go.

=== Game 3 ===
Vintage

May 21
7:00 pm

recap

Alaska Milkmen 87, Purefoods TJ Hotdogs 99
Scoring by quarter: 21–27, 14–25, 26–26, 26–21
Pts: Bong Hawkins 19; Rebs: Bong Hawkins 8 Asts: Johnny Abarrientos 9	Pts: Jerry Codiñera 18; Rebs: Edmund Reyes 9 Asts: Dindo Pumaren 7
Alaska leads series, 2–1

Araneta Coliseum, Quezon City

Purefoods opened the game with a 19–6 run and never looked back, posting leads of as many as 23 points. The Hotdogs took a 52–35 lead at the half and a 20–7 blast after Alaska drew to within 58–48 gave the Hotdogs their biggest lead, 78–55, with two minutes left in the third quarter.

=== Game 4 ===
Vintage

May 24
7:00 pm

recap

Alaska Milkmen 75, Purefoods TJ Hotdogs 62
Scoring by quarter: 23–12, 14–20, 22–16, 16–14
Pts: Abarrientos, Hawkins 18; Rebs: Bong Hawkins 18; Asts: Abarrientos 8	Pts: Codiñera 13; Rebs: Jerry Codiñera 11; Asts: Patrimonio, 3 others, 3
Alaska leads series, 3–1

Cuneta Astrodome, Pasay

The Hotdogs forced the Milkmen to seven turnovers in the second quarter, enabling them to trimmed down the 23–12 Alaska lead at the end of the first period to just 37–32 at halftime. Bong Hawkins, Johnny Abarrientos and Jojo Lastimosa presided over a 9–2 run midway through the third quarter to pad the Milkmen's lead back to 12 points at 62–50.

=== Game 5 ===
Vintage

May 26
6:00 pm

Alaska Milkmen 93, Purefoods TJ Hotdogs 92 (OT)
Alaska wins series, 4–1

Araneta Coliseum, Quezon City

Jeffrey Cariaso sank two decisive free throws with six-tenths of a second remaining in overtime to squeeze out a one-point victory for Alaska and win their first All-Filipino title. Cariaso was fouled by Bong Ravena, who tried to intercept Jun Reyes' inbound but instead tagged Cariaso's arm and drew a foul, Ravena had earlier scored on a layup to give the Hotdogs a 91–89 lead and blocked Jojo Lastimosa to set up Alvin Patrimonio's free throw off Bong Hawkins that pushed Purefoods up, 92–91 with only 10.3 seconds to go.

1996 PBA All-Filipino Cup Champions

Alaska Milkmen
Fourth title

== Rosters ==
Alaska Milkmen roster
Players

Pos.	#	POB	Name	Height	Weight	DOB (YYYY–MM–DD)	From
G/F	4	(Philippines)	Merwin Castelo	6 ft 2 in (1.88 m)	186 lb (84 kg)		San Beda
G	5	(Philippines)	Gilbert Reyes	5 ft 8 in (1.73 m)	160 lb (73 kg)		Ateneo
G/F	6	(Philippines)	Jojo Lastimosa	6 ft 1 in (1.85 m)	180 lb (82 kg)		USJ–R
G	7	(Philippines)	Roehl Gomez	6 ft 0 in (1.83 m)	180 lb (82 kg)		Cebu
F/C	12	(Philippines)	Dickie Bachmann	6 ft 5 in (1.96 m)	200 lb (91 kg)		De La Salle
G	14	(Philippines)	Johnny Abarrientos	5 ft 8 in (1.73 m)	150 lb (68 kg)		Far Eastern
F	16	(Philippines)	Bong Hawkins	6 ft 3 in (1.91 m)	220 lb (100 kg)		UPHSD
C	17	(Philippines)	Kevin Ramas	6 ft 4 in (1.93 m)	240 lb (109 kg)		Mapúa
G/F	22	(Philippines)	Jeffrey Cariaso	6 ft 2 in (1.88 m)	190 lb (86 kg)		Sonoma State
C	24	(Philippines)	Cris Bolado	6 ft 7 in (2.01 m)	260 lb (118 kg)		National-U
F	31	(Philippines)	Giovanni Pineda	6 ft 6 in (1.98 m)	190 lb (86 kg)		Adamson
C	32	(Philippines)	Poch Juinio	6 ft 5 in (1.96 m)	215 lb (98 kg)		Philippines

Coaches
Head coach
- (United States) Tim Cone
Assistant(s)
- (Philippines) Joel Banal
- (Philippines) Aric del Rosario

Legend
- (DP) Unsigned draft pick
- (FA) Free agent
- (S) Suspended
- Injured

Purefoods Tender Juicy Hotdogs roster
Players

Pos.	#	POB	Name	Height	Weight	DOB (YYYY–MM–DD)	From
G/F	1	(Philippines)	Bong Ravena	6 ft 2 in (1.88 m)	195 lb (88 kg)		UE
F	5	(Philippines)	Edmund Reyes	6 ft 3 in (1.91 m)	198 lb (90 kg)		UST
F	7	(Philippines)	Rey Evangelista	6 ft 4 in (1.93 m)	180 lb (82 kg)		UST
G/F	9	(Philippines)	Rodney Santos	6 ft 2 in (1.88 m)	175 lb (79 kg)		San Sebastian
G	10	(Philippines)	Dindo Pumaren	5 ft 9 in (1.75 m)	170 lb (77 kg)		De La Salle
G	12	(Philippines)	Glenn Capacio	6 ft 1 in (1.85 m)	185 lb (84 kg)		Far Eastern
F/C	15	(Philippines)	Bryant Punzalan	6 ft 6 in (1.98 m)	210 lb (95 kg)		Far Eastern
F	16	(Philippines)	Alvin Patrimonio	6 ft 3 in (1.91 m)	215 lb (98 kg)		Mapúa
G	17	(Philippines)	Olsen Racela	5 ft 11 in (1.80 m)	165 lb (75 kg)		Ateneo
F	23	(Philippines)	Reuben Dela Rosa	6 ft 2 in (1.88 m)	190 lb (86 kg)		Mapúa
C	44	(Philippines)	Jerry Codiñera	6 ft 5 in (1.96 m)	245 lb (111 kg)		UE

Coaches
Head coach
- (Philippines) Chot Reyes
Assistant(s)
- (Philippines) Eric Altamirano

Legend
- (DP) Unsigned draft pick
- (FA) Free agent
- (S) Suspended
- Injured

== Broadcast notes ==
Game	Play-by-play	Analyst	Courtside Reporters
Game 1	Ed Picson	Quinito Henson	Ronnie Nathanielsz and Chino Trinidad
Game 2	Sev Sarmenta	Andy Jao	
Game 3	Ed Picson	Quinito Henson	Ronnie Nathanielsz and Anthony Suntay
Game 4	Sev Sarmenta	Andy Jao	
Game 5	Ed Picson	Quinito Henson	Ronnie Nathanielsz, Chino Trinidad and Anthony Suntay
