= 1991 PBA draft =

Player selection in Philippine basketball

General information
- Date: January 15, 1991
- Time: 6:30 pm
- Location: The ULTRA, Pasig
- Network: Vintage Sports on PTV

Overview
- League: Philippine Basketball Association
- First selection: Alejandro Araneta (Alaska)

The 1991 Philippine Basketball Association (PBA) rookie draft was an event at which teams drafted players from the amateur ranks. The annual rookie draft was held on January 15, 1991, at The ULTRA.

== Round 1 ==
Pick	Player	Country of origin*	PBA team	College
1	Alejandro Araneta	Philippines	Alaska Milkmen	Ateneo de Manila
2	Rene Hawkins	Philippines	Presto Tivoli	Perpetual Help College of Rizal
3	Eugene Quilban	Philippines	Alaska Milkmen	San Sebastian College
4	Arthur Dela Cruz	Philippines	San Miguel Beermen	San Sebastian College
5	Jaime Gayoso	Philippines	Ginebra San Miguel	Ateneo de Manila
6	Rudy Enterina	Philippines	Purefoods Hotdogs	University of Visayas
7	Ronnie Lucero	Philippines	Shell Rimula X	NCBA
8	Teofano Tiu, Jr	Philippines	Presto Tivoli	Far Eastern

== Round 2 ==
Pick	Player	Country of origin*	PBA team	College
	Juancho Estrada	Philippines	Pepsi Cola	Adamson University
	Django Rivera	Philippines	Diet Sarsi	San Sebastian College
	Rosedendo Gomez	Philippines	Alaska Milkmen	Cebu Central Colleges
	MacDonald De Joya	Philippines	Shell Rimula X	San Beda College
	Joey Santamaria	Philippines	Purefoods Hotdogs	De La Salle

== Notes ==
- Purefoods owns the first pick, Alaska traded Elmer Reyes (who was acquired from Sarsi) in exchange to get the number one overall pick.
- Presto traded Manny Victorino to Pepsi to acquire the number two overall pick.
