= Joel Banal =

Filipino basketball player and coach (born 1958)

Personal information
- Born: February 6, 1958 (age 68)
- Listed height: 6 ft 4 in (1.93 m)

Career information
- College: Mapúa
- Playing career: 1982–1985
- Coaching career: 1987–2012

Career history

Playing
- 1982–1985: Great Taste Coffee Makers

Coaching
- 1987–1997: Mapúa
- 1993–1997; 2005–2011: Alaska Aces (assistant)
- 1998–2001: Pasig Pirates
- 2002–2003: Ateneo de Manila
- 2002–2003: Talk 'N Text Phone Pals (assistant)
- 2003–2005: Talk 'N Text Phone Pals
- 2011–2012: Alaska Aces

Career highlights
- As player: 4× PBA champion (1984 Second All-Filipino, 1984 Invitational, 1985 Open, 1985 All-Filipino); As head coach: PBA champion (2003 All-Filipino); 2× NCAA Philippines champion (1990, 1991); UAAP champion (2002); As assistant coach: 8× PBA champion (1994 Governors', 1995 Governors', 1996 All-Filipino, 1996 Commissioner's, 1996 Governors', 1997 Governors', 2007 Fiesta, 2010 Fiesta); Grand Slam champion (1996)

Joel Banal (born February 6, 1958) is a retired Filipino professional basketball player, and former head coach in the Philippine Basketball Association (PBA). He is the former commissioner of the now-defunct Pilipinas Commercial Basketball League (PCBL). Banal is the only head coach to win championships in the NCAA, UAAP, PBL, and the PBA.

== Profile ==
=== Playing career ===
Banal played college ball for the Mapúa Institute of Technology, before venturing into professional basketball with the Great Taste Coffee Makers in the PBA from 1982–1985 where he got an injury. After his semi-retirement from the PBA, he worked as a circulation director of The Philippine Star.

=== Coaching career ===
His first coaching stint was for RC Cola team played in the Philippine Basketball League.

He was previously the head coach of the collegiate teams Mapua Cardinals in the NCAA, Ateneo Blue Eagles in the UAAP (won the 2002 UAAP title), the Casino Rubbing Alcohol and Hapee Nenaco in the PBL, and the Talk 'N Text Phone Pals in the PBA, where he won championships in all of the four leagues. He is also the assistant coach of the Pasig Pirates in the Metropolitan Basketball Association.

In 2011, he replaced longtime head coach Tim Cone as coach of the Alaska Aces after serving as Cone's longtime deputy. He stepped down from the position in 2012.

Shortly after his resignation, Banal focused on his family-owned school business, Domuschola International School where he was the president until 2015.

=== PCBL commissioner ===
In 2016, Banal returned to basketball after he appointed as the league commissioner of Pilipinas Commercial Basketball League starting this 2016 Chairman's Cup. He will take over the position from Ato Badolato.

== Coaching records ==
=== Collegiate record ===
| Season | | Eliminations | | | | | Playoffs | | | | |
| Season | Team | Finish | GP | W | L | PCT | PG | W | L | PCT | Results |
|---|---|---|---|---|---|---|---|---|---|---|---|
| 1997 | MIT | 4th | 12 | 7 | 5 | .583 | 1 | 0 | 1 | .000 | Stepladder round 2 |
| 2002 | ADMU | 3rd | 14 | 9 | 5 | .643 | 5 | 4 | 1 | .800 | Champions |
| 2003 | ADMU | 1st | 14 | 11 | 3 | .786 | 4 | 1 | 3 | .250 | Runner-up |
| Totals (since 1997) | | | 40 | 27 | 13 | .675 | 10 | 5 | 5 | .500 | 1 championship |

=== PBA record ===
| Team | Season | Conference | Elims./Clas. round | | | | | Playoffs | | | | |
| Team | Season | Conference | G | W | L | PCT | Finish | PG | W | L | PCT | Results |
|---|---|---|---|---|---|---|---|---|---|---|---|---|
| Talk 'N Text | 2003 | All-Filipino Cup | 9 | 6 | 3 | .666 | 3rd (in Group B) | 14 | 9 | 5 | .643 | Won PBA championship |
| Talk 'N Text | 2004 Fiesta (Transitional) | | 18 | 11 | 7 | .611 | 4th | 6 | 4 | 2 | .000 | Won Third Place |
| Talk 'N Text | 2004–05 | Philippine Cup | 18 | 12 | 6 | .667 | 2nd | 9 | 7 | 2 | .778 | Lost in the finals |
| Talk 'N Text | 2004–05 | Fiesta | 18 | 12 | 6 | .667 | 1st | 9 | 4 | 5 | .444 | Lost in the finals |
| Talk 'N Text | 2005–06 | Fiesta | 16 | 9 | 7 | .563 | 4th | 5 | 3 | 2 | .600 | Lost in the quarterfinals |
| Talk 'N Text | 2005–06 | Philippine Cup | 16 | 6 | 10 | .375 | 8th | 3 | 0 | 3 | .000 | Lost in the wildcard single round-robin |
| Alaska | 2011–12 | Philippine Cup | 11 | 3 | 8 | .273 | 11th | — | — | — | — | Missed Playoffs |
| Alaska | 2011–12 | Commissioner's Cup | 9 | 5 | 4 | .556 | 4th | 3 | 1 | 2 | .000 | Lost in the quarterfinals |
| Totals | | | 115 | 64 | 51 | .557 | Playoff Totals | 49 | 28 | 21 | .571 | 1 PBA championship |

== Personal life ==
Banal is the elder brother of former Phoenix Fuel Masters head coach Koy Banal. His older brother, Conrad, served as the business writer for newspapers Philippine Daily Inquirer and The Philippine Star and was once a player for the Ateneo men's basketball team.

| Preceded by Valerio Lopez | Mapua Cardinals men's basketball head coach 1987-1997 | Succeeded by Bong Ramos |
| Preceded by Joe Lipa | Ateneo Blue Eagles men's basketball head coach 2002-2003 | Succeeded by Sandy Arespacochaga |
| Preceded by Paul Woolpert | Talk 'N Text Phone Pals head coach 2003-2005 | Succeeded by Derrick Pumaren |
| Preceded by Tim Cone | Alaska Aces Head Coach; 2011-2012 | Succeeded by Luigi Trillo |
| Preceded by Ato Batolato | Pilipinas Commercial Basketball League commissioner 2016 | Succeeded by Final (ceased) |
