= 1996 Mobiline Cellulars season =

- Head coach: Yeng Guiao
- General manager: Dindo Raymundo
- Owner: Pilipino Telephone Corporation

All-Filipino Cup results
- Record: 4–10 (28.6%)
- Place: 8th
- Playoff finish: N/A

Commissioner's Cup results
- Record: 1–9 (10%)
- Place: 8th
- Playoff finish: N/A

Governors' Cup results
- Record: 2–9 (18.2%)
- Place: 8th
- Playoff finish: N/A

Mobiline Cellulars seasons

The 1996 Mobiline Cellulars season was the seventh season of the franchise in the Philippine Basketball Association (PBA). The team was formerly known as Pepsi Mega Bottlers in the All-Filipino Cup.

== Draft pick ==
Round	Pick	Player	College
1	7	Peter Martin	San Sebastian

== Occurrences ==
Pepsi tried to sell its franchise to Duty Free Shoppers Inc. but the PBA Board stepped in and prevented the transaction because the Lorenzos were not major owners of Duty Free.

The first month of the year during the off-season, Pepsi Mega tendered an offer sheet to Sunkist's Al Solis for three years amounting to P9.36 million. RFM through Team Manager Elmer Yanga said the club was not honoring the offer sheet of Pepsi since Al Solis signed a new contract with the Juicers in the middle of 1995. The PBA on the other hand considers Pepsi's offer sheet legal than the supposed "contract or agreement" signed by Solis with Sunkist binding. Upon consultation with their lawyers, RFM announced in the press conference they are suing Solis because he signed the offer sheet of Pepsi without informing the management which RFM claimed was done in bad faith.

Pepsi's franchise was transferred to Lapanday Holdings Corporation, the holding company of the family of Luis "Moro" Lorenzo, it is said that the company was also owned by the Cojuangco family. The team was renamed Mobiline Cellulars beginning the Commissioner's Cup. Pagemart Philippines, Inc., a telecoms marketing company affiliated with the Lapanday Holdings and Pilipino Telephone Corporation (PILTEL) was tasked to select a new team name and negotiations have been finalized for the use of Mobiline’s brand name.

== Notable dates ==
February 20: Rookie Peter Martin sink two free throws with 13.4 seconds left as Pepsi rallies and send Ginebra San Miguel into a record-tying 18-game losing streak in a 98-94 win, spoiling the debut of highly touted Ginebra rookie Marlou Aquino.

June 18: The Cellulars leaned on a big fourth quarter surge to defeat defending champion Sunkist, 89-83, for their first and only win in the Commissioners Cup.

October 8: Mobiline scored its first victory in the Governors Cup with a 127-92 rout over Purefoods Corned Beef Cowboys. Import Derrick Canada posted a triple-double of 38 points, 10 rebounds and 11 assists.

== Roster ==
1996 Mobiline Cellulars roster
Players

Pos.	#	POB	Name	Height	Weight	DOB (YYYY–MM–DD)	From
F	2	(Philippines)	Dwight Lago	6 ft 2 in (1.88 m)			De La Salle
G/F	3	(Philippines)	Romeo Lopez	6 ft 0 in (1.83 m)			Angeles
F	6	(Philippines)	Bobby Jose	6 ft 3 in (1.91 m)			UST
G	7	(Philippines)	Eugene Quilban	5 ft 7 in (1.70 m)			San Sebastian
G	8	(Philippines)	Al Solis	5 ft 11 in (1.80 m)	170 lb (77 kg)		Visayas
G/F	9	(Philippines)	Boy Cabahug	5 ft 11 in (1.80 m)	165 lb (75 kg)		Visayas
F/C	10	(Philippines)	Richard Del Rosario	6 ft 5 in (1.96 m)	215 lb (98 kg)		De La Salle
F	13	(Philippines)	Elpidio Villamin	6 ft 2 in (1.88 m)	188 lb (85 kg)
F	14	(Philippines)	Larry Villanil	6 ft 0 in (1.83 m)			USPF
C	18	(Philippines)	Rey Cuenco	6 ft 4 in (1.93 m)			De La Salle Araneta
F/C	19	(Philippines)	Joey Santamaria	6 ft 3 in (1.91 m)			De La Salle
F	21	(Philippines)	Peter Martin	6 ft 3 in (1.91 m)	200 lb (91 kg)		San Sebastian
C	41	(Philippines)	Jack Tanuan	6 ft 5 in (1.96 m)	215 lb (98 kg)		Far Eastern
F/C	88	(Philippines)	Cadel Mosqueda	6 ft 3 in (1.91 m)			Arellano

Coaches

Head coach

- (Philippines) Yeng Guiao

Assistant coach(es)

- (Philippines) Bong Go
- (Philippines) Roehl Nadurata

Team manager

- (Philippines) Dindo Raymundo

Legend

- (C) Team captain
- Injured

== Transactions ==
=== Trades ===
Off-season	To Sunkist Alvin Teng	To Pepsi Elpidio Villamin
Off-season	To Purefoods Dindo Pumaren	To Pepsi Jack Tanuan

=== Additions ===
Player	Signed	Former team
Al Solis	Off-season	Sunkist
Richard Del Rosario	Off-season	^{Rookie, originally pick by Purefoods}

=== Recruited imports ===
Tournament	Name	Number	Position	University/College	Duration
Commissioner's Cup	Ronnie Coleman	24	Center	USC	June 14 to July 23
Governors' Cup	Derrick Canada	5	Guard	West Point	September 29 to November 12
