= Cris Bolado =

Filipino basketball player (1969–2017)

Personal information
- Born: October 25, 1969 Lucban, Quezon, Philippines
- Died: September 17, 2017 (aged 47) Phnom Penh, Cambodia
- Listed height: 6 ft 7 in (2.01 m)

Career information
- College: NU (1987–1989); UM (1991)
- PBA draft: 1994: 2nd round, 13th overall pick
- Drafted by: Alaska Milkmen
- Playing career: 1994–2003
- Position: Center

Career history
- 1994–1997: Alaska Milkmen
- 1997: Purefoods Corned Beef Cowboys
- 1997–1998: Gordon's Gin Boars / Ginebra San Miguel
- 1999: Pop Cola 800s
- 1999: San Miguel Beermen
- 2000: Batang Red Bull Thunder
- 2002–2003: Coca Cola Tigers

Career highlights
- 11× PBA champion (1994 Governors', 1995 Governors', 1996 All-Filipino, 1996 Commissioner's, 1996 Governors', 1997 All-Filipino, 1997 Commissioner's, 1999 Commissioner's, 1999 Governors', 2002 All-Filipino, 2003 Reinforced); PBA All-Star (1997)

Crisanto "Jumbo" Bolado (October 25, 1969 – September 17, 2017) was a Filipino professional basketball player.

== Basketball career ==
In college, Bolado first played for the National University Bulldogs, then left in 1989. He then played for the University of Manila Hawks in 1991. He was selected by Alaska in the second round of the 1994 PBA draft. Listed at 6 ft 7 in (2.01 m), Bolado tied Dong Polistico of the San Miguel Beermen as the second tallest player in the league at that time.

He became part of the Alaska Milkmen's 1996 Grand Slam team and in terms of finals stints, Bolado was one of the most successful in the PBA, making it to the championship series for ten straight times - from Alaska, Purefoods, and Gordon's Gin.

In 1999, he was in his fourth PBA team with Pop Cola and then was traded to San Miguel Beermen where he became a member of two more championships. Bolado won a total of 11 titles in the league and retired in 2003.

== Later life and death ==
In 2009, Bolado was a participant in Survivor Philippines: Palau. He was voted off the island after making it to as one of the final four members of his tribe before the tribes were merged. Bolado starred in films Anting-Anting and The Fighting Chefs, and guested at the TV series At Your Service.

Bolado moved to Cambodia with his wife in 2013. He worked there as a basketball coach in an international school in Phnom Penh. He also managed Inasal Nation, a Filipino restaurant. He died in a motorcycle accident on September 17, 2017, at age 47 in Phnom Penh. At the time of his death, Bolado was married to Anne Christine Waje, of whom he had two children.

== Filmography ==
- Anting-anting (1998)
- At Your Service (TV series, one episode; 2005)
- Survivor Philippines (TV series, one season; 2009)
- The Fighting Chefs (2013) Bodyguard
