= 1996 Sunkist Orange Bottlers season =

- Head coach: Derrick Pumaren
- General manager: Elmer Yanga
- Owner: RFM Corporation

All Filipino Cup results
- Record: 4–10 (28.6%)
- Place: 7th
- Playoff finish: N/A

Commissioner's Cup results
- Record: 5–6 (45.5%)
- Place: 6th
- Playoff finish: N/A

Governor's Cup results
- Record: 6–7 (46.2%)
- Place: 5th
- Playoff finish: Quarterfinals

Sunkist Orange Bottlers seasons

The 1996 Sunkist Orange Bottlers season was the 7th season of the franchise in the Philippine Basketball Association (PBA). They were known as the Sunkist Orange Juicers in the All-Filipino Cup.

== Draft picks ==
Round	Pick	Player	College
1	8	Joselito Rodriguez	UNO-R

== Occurrences ==
Tony Harris came back as their import in the Governor's Cup, but the Hurricane could only play three games after Sunkist lost two straight matches to Shell and Purefoods. The coaching staff decided to replace Harris with new import Lester Neal.

== Notable dates ==
March 12: Vergel Meneses unloaded 14 of his 29 points in the fourth quarter and led a breakaway by Sunkist in the last eight minutes as the defending All-Filipino Cup champions pulled off a 93-84 victory over San Miguel Beermen and evened up their won-loss record to three wins and three losses.

June 21: Marques Bragg banged in a three-point play off Ronnie Thompkins with 14.5 seconds left to snap the final tie and Sunkist recovered from an early 16-point deficit to scuttle Purefoods Tender Juicy Hotdogs, 97-93. It was the Orange Bottlers first win in three games in the Commissioners Cup.

September 29: Alvin Teng put back a miss by Tony Harris with 4.7 seconds left to lift Sunkist to a thrilling 93-91 victory over defending champion Alaska Milkmen at the start of the Governors Cup.

== Roster ==
1996 Sunkist Orange Bottlers roster
Players

Pos.	#	POB	Name	Height	Weight	DOB (YYYY–MM–DD)	From
C	1	(Philippines)	Manny Victorino	6 ft 5 in (1.96 m)			José Rizal
G		(Philippines)	Siot Tanquingcen	5 ft 9 in (1.75 m)			UST
C	4	(Philippines)	Bonel Balingit	6 ft 9 in (2.06 m)			Visayas
G	5	(Philippines)	Jack Santiago	5 ft 9 in (1.75 m)			Mapúa
F	6 & 19	(Philippines)	Kenneth Duremdes	6 ft 3 in (1.91 m)			Adamson
G	9	(Philippines)	Boybits Victoria	5 ft 11 in (1.80 m)			San Beda
F/C	10	(Philippines)	Alvin Teng	6 ft 4 in (1.93 m)			Arellano
G	11 & 6	(Philippines)	Ato Agustin	5 ft 11 in (1.80 m)			Lyceum
G	14	(Philippines)	Rudy Distrito	5 ft 11 in (1.80 m)			UE
F	18	(Philippines)	Vergel Meneses	6 ft 3 in (1.91 m)			José Rizal
G	23	(Philippines)	Ricardo Marata	5 ft 9 in (1.75 m)			Southwestern-U
F	24	(Philippines)	Eric Reyes	6 ft 4 in (1.93 m)			Ateneo
C	35	(Philippines)	Zaldy Realubit	6 ft 6 in (1.98 m)			USJ–R
C	43	(Philippines)	Alejandro Paguinto	6 ft 4 in (1.93 m)			Far Eastern
F	64	(Philippines)	Marcelino Morelos	6 ft 2 in (1.88 m)			UE

Coaches

Head coach

- (Philippines) Derrick Pumaren

Assistant coach(es)

- (Philippines) Gabby Velasco
- (Philippines) Arturo Valenzona
- (Philippines) Hector Calma

Team manager

- (Philippines) Elmer Yanga

Legend

- (C) Team captain
- Injured

== Transactions ==
=== Additions ===
Name	Deal Information	Former team
Gerardo Santiago	Rookie free agent	N/A
Siot Tanquingcen	Rookie free agent	N/A
Manny Victorino	Signed to a short-term contract late in the season to fill the spot of the injured Bonel Balingit	Purefoods (1994)

=== Trades ===
Off-season	To Pepsi Yoyoy Villamin	To Sunkist Alvin Teng
April 1, 1996	To San Miguel Beermen #25 Nelson Asaytono	To Sunkist Ato Agustin, Mar Morelos

=== Recruited imports ===
Tournament	Name	Number	Position	University/college	Duration
Commissioner's Cup	Marques Bragg	33	Center-Forward	Providence College	June 14 to July 30
Governors' Cup	Tony Harris	22	Guard-Forward	University of New Orleans	September 29 to October 6
Governors' Cup	Lester Neal	44	Forward	Arizona State	October 11 to November 24
