= 1996 Sta. Lucia Realtors season =

- Head coach: Adonis Tierra
- Owner: Sta. Lucia Realty and Development Corporation

All Filipino Cup results
- Record: 6–8 (42.9%)
- Place: 6th
- Playoff finish: N/A

Commissioner's Cup results
- Record: 9–10 (47.4%)
- Place: 3rd
- Playoff finish: Semifinals

Governor's Cup results
- Record: 5–7 (41.7%)
- Place: 7th
- Playoff finish: N/A

Sta. Lucia Realtors seasons

The 1996 Sta. Lucia Realtors season was the 4th season of the franchise in the Philippine Basketball Association (PBA).

== Draft pick ==
Round	Pick	Player	College
1	4	Arnold Gamboa	FEU

== Summary ==
Assistant coach Adonis Tierra took over from Nat Canson at the start of the season. The Realtors fell short of a semifinal stint in the All-Filipino Cup when they lost to Formula Shell in their last game in the eliminations on April 16 and failed to create a tie with Ginebra, which booked its first semifinal appearances in three years.

Import Melvin Simon led Sta. Lucia to five straight wins in the Commissioners Cup. The Realtors beat Sunkist 74-73 in the opening game on June 14. Their second win came against San Miguel Beermen, 79-77 in Dagupan City on June 20. Three more victories followed over Mobiline, Shell and Purefoods, for their best start in franchise history. The Realtors then lost three straight games, and Simon was replaced by Eldridge Hudson. In the semifinal round, the Realtors lost two of their first three outings, and Hudson was sent home. Sta. Lucia had their third reinforcement James Hodges, who scored 30 points in his debut, but the Realtors still lost to importless Alaska Milkmen, 86-89 on August 11. Hodges played six games for the Realtors, which placed third in the conference.

Sta. Lucia won their first game in the Governors Cup over Purefoods, 76-73 in overtime on October 1, playing without an import in the second half as coach Adonis Tierra benched Tyrone Grandberry midway in the second quarter for lackluster play. Grandberry went down in league history as one of the imports with the shortest stints, as he played for only 15 minutes and scored four points. He was replaced immediately in the Realtors' next game by their resident import Lambert Shell, who was on his fourth duty in four years with Sta. Lucia. The Realtors were tied with Purefoods and Sunkist after the eliminations, with five wins and six losses, they lost to Purefoods in a playoff for the last quarterfinals berth, 76-81 on November 17.

== Notable dates ==
June 23: Sta. Lucia turned to import Melvin Simon for the big baskets as it bounced back from an anemic five-point second quarter to repulse Mobiline, 75-73, for their third straight squeaker win. Simon banged in 18 of his 24 points in the second half, including the decisive basket down low with 25.4 seconds left.

June 28: Boyet Fernandez buried a triple with 43.9 seconds left, while Jun Limpot nailed a follow-up shot off Fernandez' missed-free throw in the final 16 seconds, to lift Sta. Lucia past Shell, 93-90 in overtime, and assume the solo lead in the Commissioners Cup with its fourth straight scrambling victory.

October 26: Boyet Fernandez scored two quick baskets in the final minute, capped by a driving layup with 3.9 seconds left that snapped the final tie as Sta. Lucia scored a pulsating 95-93 win over Sunkist Orange Bottlers at St.La Salle gym in Bacolod City. Realtors' main man Jun Limpot finished with his personal-best and a season high 41 points.

== Roster ==
1996 Sta. Lucia Realtors roster
Players

Pos.	#	POB	Name	Height	Weight	DOB (YYYY–MM–DD)	From
F	3	(United States)	Chris Jackson	6 ft 4 in (1.93 m)			San Bernardino Valley
F	6	(Philippines)	Johnedel Cardel	6 ft 0 in (1.83 m)			De La Salle
F	8	(Philippines)	Roberto Jabar	6 ft 0 in (1.83 m)			Southwestern-U
G/F	9	(Philippines)	Ludovico Valenciano	6 ft 1 in (1.85 m)			USLS
G	10	(Philippines)	Boyet Fernandez	5 ft 9 in (1.75 m)			San Agustin
F	12	(Philippines)	Jose Francisco	6 ft 0 in (1.83 m)			Far Eastern
G	14	(Philippines)	Gerry Esplana	6 ft 0 in (1.83 m)			Far Eastern
F	15	(Philippines)	Expedito Falcasantos	6 ft 4 in (1.93 m)			Cebu
C	16	(Philippines)	Dennis Espino	6 ft 6 in (1.98 m)			UST
C	18	(Philippines)	Arnold Gamboa	6 ft 6 in (1.98 m)			Far Eastern
G	22	(Philippines)	Matthew Makalintal	5 ft 9 in (1.75 m)			St. Benilde
F	62 & 26	(Philippines)	Alejandro De Guzman	6 ft 2 in (1.88 m)			Far Eastern
G	27	(Philippines)	Melchor Teves	6 ft 2 in (1.88 m)			San Sebastian
F	57	(Philippines)	Romeo Dela Rosa	6 ft 2 in (1.88 m)			Southwestern-U
C	72	(Philippines)	Jun Limpot	6 ft 5 in (1.96 m)			De La Salle

Coaches

Head coach

- (Philippines) Adonis Tierra

Assistant coach(es)

- (Philippines) Ricardo Cui
- (Philippines) Joshua Villapando

Team manager

- (Philippines) Buddy Encarnado

Legend

- (C) Team captain
- Injured

== Transactions ==
=== Additions ===
Player	Signed	Former team
Matt Makalintal	Off-season	San Miguel

=== Recruited imports ===
Tournament	Name	Number	Position	University/college	Duration
Commissioner's Cup	Melvin Simon	34	Center	University of New Orleans	June 14 to July 12
Commissioner's Cup	Eldridge Hudson	33	Forward-center	UNLV	July 16 to August 6
Commissioner's Cup	James Hodges	32	Forward-center	University of Wisconsin	August 11-27
Governors' Cup	Tyrone Grandberry		Guard-forward	North Carolina	October 1 (one game)
Governors' Cup	Lambert Shell	42	Guard-forward	University of Bridgeport	October 6 to November 17
