= Sean Chambers =

American basketball player (born 1965)

FEU Tamaraws
- Title: Head coach
- League: UAAP

Personal information
- Born: February 27, 1965 (age 61) Los Angeles, California
- Listed height: 6 ft 2 in (1.88 m)
- Listed weight: 196 lb (89 kg)

Career information
- High school: Highlands (North Highlands, California)
- College: Cuesta College (1983–1985); Cal Poly (1985–1987)
- Playing career: 1989–2001
- Position: Forward
- Number: 20

Career history

Playing
- 1989–2001: Alaska Aces (PBA)

Coaching
- 2017–2018: Alaska Aces (consultant)
- 2023–present: TNT Tropang Giga (player development)
- 2024–present: FEU Tamaraws
- 2024–present: Philippines (assistant)

Career highlights
- As player: 6× PBA champion (1991 Third Conference, 1994 Governors', 1995 Governors', 1996 Commissioner's, 1996 Governors', 1997 Governors'); PBA Best Import (1996 Governors'); No. 20 retired by Alaska Aces

Sean Chambers (born February 27, 1965) is a retired American professional basketball player, best known for being a resident import of the Alaska Aces basketball team in the Philippine Basketball Association from 1989 to 2001.

He formerly served an assistant coach for the TNT Tropang Giga, and now current coach of the FEU Tamaraws.

== Early life ==
Beginning his collegiate career at Cuesta College, Chambers led the Cougars to a 20-11 season as a sophomore, highlighted by averaging 22.8 points per game.

A back-to-back CCAA Player of the Year and 1986 third-team NABC All-American while playing for Cal Poly, Chambers was asked to try out for the United States Athletics team to the 1988 Seoul Olympics but preferred to stick to basketball.

He once held the record in high jump for the Grant Union School District, with a top lifetime clearance of 7 feet, 1.25 inches, which ranked as the country's fourth-leading prep high jump in 1983 (attracting a recruiting offer for track & field from Florida State before he elected to fully play basketball).

== Professional basketball career ==
Standing 6-foot-2, Chambers went to Manila with the Los Angeles Jaguars to play in the first PBA-IBA World Challenge series. In a sideshow, Chambers topped the special slam dunk competition. He went back the following year with the Jaguars and in 1989 PBA First Conference, he was hired by then Alaska coach Bogs Adornado to replace Carl Lott as their import.

In 1991, Chambers led the Alaska Milkmen to their first-ever PBA championship, and finally got an award when he was named only the second recipient of the Mr. 100% award. Norman Black won the award in 1983. For the whole of 1991 PBA season, Chambers averaged 37.7 points in two conferences in a total of 34 games. He played 10 more seasons in the PBA with Alaska, and had the most titles among imports tied with Justin Brownlee, including a grand slam in 1996.

== PBA career statistics ==
Legend
GP	Games played	MPG	Minutes per game
FG%	Field-goal percentage	3P%	3-point field-goal percentage	FT%	Free-throw percentage
RPG	Rebounds per game	APG	Assists per game	SPG	Steals per game
BPG	Blocks per game	PPG	Points per game	**Bold**	Career high

=== Season-by-season averages ===
Year	Team	GP	MPG	FG%	3P%	FT%	RPG	APG	SPG	BPG	PPG
1989	Alaska	**38**	46.7	.593	.323	.707	**15.4**	**6.3**	**1.5**	1.8	38.3
1990	Alaska	23	**47.5**	.570	.250	.708	12.3	4.8	.9	**1.9**	29.9
1991	Alaska	34	47.1	.548	.167	.745	12.4	4.3	.7	1.8	37.7
1992	Alaska	12	47.1	.559	.000	**.747**	13.8	6.0	1.2	**1.9**	**39.8**
1993	Alaska	5	45.0	**.618**	.000	.608	12.4	3.4	.4	.6	33.4
1994	Alaska	23	45.9	.556	.333	.698	13.0	4.3	1.0	1.1	33.8
1995	Alaska	25	47.0	.589	**.500**	.710	11.6	4.5	.8	1.0	31.9
1996	Alaska	30	44.8	.567	.000	.737	10.8	4.0	1.0	.6	29.8
1997	Alaska	22	45.7	.567	.333	.642	11.0	3.9	.8	.8	25.0
1998	Alaska	18	43.9	.432	.308	.652	10.2	4.4	.6	.6	23.5
1999	Alaska	18	46.6	.455	.000	.696	10.3	4.7	1.2	.7	19.1
2000	Alaska	11	44.6	.453	.000	.632	10.3	4.5	1.2	1.1	18.9
2001	Alaska	11	46.3	.402	.000	.667	8.8	5.3	.7	.8	15.1
Career		270	46.2	.547	.268	.708	13.0	4.7	1.0	1.2	30.5

== Post-basketball career ==
=== Educational/Academic ===
He worked at Fern Bacon Middle School as the Dean of Students.

=== Coaching career ===
In 2020, it was rumored that he and Aric del Rosario are potential head coaching candidates for the UST Growling Tigers, but later got by Jino Manansala.

In 2023, Chambers accepted a position on the coaching staff of the TNT Tropang Giga, specifically in player development.

In 2024, Far Eastern University Tamaraws hired him as head coach. He was later hired by Philippine national basketball team as an assistant coach, reuniting with Tim Cone.
