= 1996 San Miguel Beermen season =

- Head coach: Norman Black
- Owner: San Miguel Corporation

All Filipino Cup results
- Record: 13–10 (56.5%)
- Place: 3rd
- Playoff finish: Semifinals

Commissioner's Cup results
- Record: 4–6 (40%)
- Place: 7th
- Playoff finish: N/A

Governors Cup results
- Record: 8–10 (44.4%)
- Place: 4th
- Playoff finish: Semifinals

San Miguel Beermen seasons

The 1996 San Miguel Beermen season was the 22nd season of the franchise in the Philippine Basketball Association (PBA).

== Draft picks ==
Round	Pick	Player	College
1	5	Marcelino Morelos	UE
1	6	Gilbert Castillo	Letran
2	13	Roel Bravo	University of Manila

== Occurrences ==
In the Commissioners Cup, San Miguel's original choice for an import, Norris Coleman, could not make it on time and the Beermen decided to tapped Agee Ward for their first game against Purefoods. Ward was readily shipped home by the Beermen after scoring only 12 points in the 87-108 loss to the Hotdogs. In San Miguel's next game against Sta.Lucia in Dagupan City, coach Norman Black decided to come out of a six-year retirement and suited up as their import and the Beermen also welcomes the return of Samboy Lim in action.

== Notable dates ==
February 18: The Beermen banked on Allan Caidic's two clutch triples to defeat Purefoods Tender Juicy Hotdogs, 80-69, in the opening game of the season.

March 9: San Miguel held down Pepsi Mega to the league's lowest score yet, a record-low 54 points in a 95-54 victory in Dumaguete City for its third win in the All-Filipino Cup.

June 30: San Miguel finally got a taste of victory in the Commissioners Cup, crushing sister team Ginebra San Miguel, 112-91, to snap a four-game losing streak. New Import Andre Spencer, who debut last week and the second import to arrived for the Beermen came away with 24 points.

July 14: A stirring 14-0 counter-assault midway through the final period by the Beermen turn a 65-73 deficit into a surprising 89-77 victory over Formula Shell as the Beermen climbed up in a tie with Sunkist, Ginebra and Purefoods with four wins and four losses. The victory was the fourth straight for San Miguel from a dismal 0-4 start.

September 29: San Miguel struggled to a 105-104 victory over Mobiline at the start of the Governors Cup. Beermen import Lamont Strothers, who had one-year stints with Portland and Dallas in the NBA and whose PBA campaign took off in the wrong foot when he got involved in an ugly brawl with Mobiline's Jack Tanuan during a pre-tournament game, finished with 45 points and his driving layup with 6.7 seconds left proved to be the decisive basket.

October 6: San Miguel brought down Sta.Lucia, 97-86, to gain a share of second place in the Governors Cup. Lamont Strothers poured in a season-high 56 points, going 16-of-16 from the free throw line.

== Roster ==
1996 San Miguel Beermen roster
Players

Pos.	#	POB	Name	Height	Weight	DOB (YYYY–MM–DD)	From
G	5	(Philippines)	Franz Pumaren	5 ft 9 in (1.75 m)			De La Salle
G/F	7	(Philippines)	Mike Mustre	6 ft 0 in (1.83 m)			Letran
F	8	(Philippines)	Allan Caidic	6 ft 2 in (1.88 m)			UE
F	9	(Philippines)	Samboy Lim	6 ft 0 in (1.83 m)			Letran
C	10	(Philippines)	Adriano Polistico	6 ft 7 in (2.01 m)			Letran
PF	11	(Philippines)	Nelson Asaytono	6 ft 3 in (1.91 m)			Manila
F/C	12	(Philippines)	Yves Dignadice	6 ft 4 in (1.93 m)			STI WNU
F/C	14	(Philippines)	Gilbert Castillo	6 ft 4 in (1.93 m)			Letran
G	16	(Philippines)	Roel Bravo	5 ft 9 in (1.75 m)			Manila
F	18	(Philippines)	Art Dela Cruz	6 ft 2 in (1.88 m)			San Sebastian
G	22	(Philippines)	Frankie Lim	6 ft 0 in (1.83 m)			San Beda
F	23	(Philippines)	Paul Alvarez	6 ft 1 in (1.85 m)			San Sebastian
F/C	25	(Philippines)	Freddie Abuda	6 ft 4 in (1.93 m)			Cebu
C	52	(Philippines)	Gido Babilonia	6 ft 6 in (1.98 m)			UST

Coaches
Head coach
- (United States) Norman Black
Assistant(s)
- (Philippines) Jong Uichico
- (Philippines) Filomeno Pumaren

Legend
- (DP) Unsigned draft pick
- (FA) Free agent
- (S) Suspended
- Injured

_{Team Manager: Nazario Avendaño}

== Transactions ==
=== Trades ===
April 1, 1996	To Sunkist Ato Agustin, Mar Morelos	To San Miguel Beermen Nelson Asaytono

=== Additions ===
Player	Signed	Former team
Frankie Lim	Off-season	Shell

=== Recruited imports ===
Tournament	Name	Number	Position	University/College	Duration
Commissioner's Cup	Agee Ward	21	Forward-Center	Cal State Fullerton	June 16 (one game)
Commissioner's Cup	Norman Black	24	Center-Forward	Saint Joseph’s	June 20 (one game)
Commissioner's Cup	Andre Spencer	20	Center-Forward	Northern Arizona	June 25 to July 21
Governors' Cup	Lamont Strothers	42	Guard	Christopher Newport	September 29 to December 8
