= Jun Reyes =

Filipino basketball player & coach (born 1967)

Personal information
- Born: June 19, 1967 (age 59)
- Listed height: 5 ft 8 in (1.73 m)
- Listed weight: 160 lb (73 kg)

Career information
- College: Ateneo
- PBA draft: 1990: 1st round, 3rd overall pick
- Drafted by: Pepsi Cola
- Playing career: 1990–2002
- Position: Point guard
- Number: 5

Career history

Playing
- 1990–1991: Pepsi
- 1992–1996: Alaska Milkmen
- 1997: Sta. Lucia Realtors
- 1998–2000: Alaska Milkmen

Coaching
- 1998–2003: Alaska Milkmen (assistant)

Career highlights
- As player: 8× PBA champion (1994 Governors', 1995 Governors', 1996 All-Filipino, 1996 Commissioner's, 1996 Governors', 1998 All-Filipino, 1998 Commissioner's, 2000 All-Filipino); Grand Slam champion (1996); PBA Mr. Quality Minutes Award (1996); 2× UAAP champion (1987, 1988); 2x UAAP Most Valuable Player (1987, 1988); As assistant coach: 4x PBA champion (1998 All-Filipino, 1998 Commissioner's, 2000 All-Filipino, 2003 Invitational)

John Gilbert "Jun" Reyes Jr. (born June 19, 1967) is a former Filipino basketball player and coach. He was also called "Jun-Jun".

== Playing career ==
Reyes played with Danny Francisco, Eric Reyes, and future PBA star Olsen Racela in Ateneo Blue Eagles, and won championship against Jerry Codiñera-led UE in 1987 and Dindo Pumaren-led La Salle in 1988. In PBA, he played for Pepsi Hotshots, Alaska Milkmen twice (first tenure helped his squad won Grand Slam), and Sta. Lucia Realtors.

== Personal life ==
He is the brother of PBA champion coach Chot Reyes. Jun now resides in the United States.
