= Poch Juinio =

Filipino basketball player (born 1973)

UP Fighting Maroons
- Title: Assistant coach
- League: UAAP

Personal information
- Born: May 25, 1973 (age 53) Quezon City, Philippines
- Listed height: 6 ft 5 in (1.96 m)
- Listed weight: 215 lb (98 kg)

Career information
- College: UP
- PBA draft: 1994: , 5th overall pick
- Drafted by: Alaska Milkmen
- Playing career: 1994–2008
- Position: Power forward / center
- Number: 32
- Coaching career: 2013–present

Career history

Playing
- 1994–2000: Alaska Milkmen
- 2001: Pop Cola Panthers
- 2002–2006: Coca-Cola Tigers
- 2006: Talk 'N Text Phone Pals
- 2006–2008: Alaska Aces

Coaching
- 2013–present: UP (assistant)

Career highlights
- As player: 12x PBA champion (1994 Governors', 1995 Governors', 1996 All-Filipino, 1996 Commissioner's, 1996 Governors', 1997 Governors', 1998 All-Filipino, 1998 Commissioner's, 2000 All-Filipino, 2002 All-Filipino, 2003 Reinforced, 2007 Fiesta); 2x PBA All-Star (1996, 2001); PBA Most Improved Player (1996); PBA Finals Most Valuable Player (2000 All-Filipino); As assistant coach: 2× UAAP champion (2022, 2024)

Edward "Poch" Juinio (born May 25, 1973) is a Filipino retired former professional basketball player of the Philippine Basketball Association (PBA). He played most of his seasons with Alaska Aces and won numerous championships.

== Professional career ==
=== Alaska Milkmen ===
A former 6'5" standout of the UP Fighting Maroons, Juinio was drafted by Alaska as the 5th overall pick in the 1994 PBA Draft. He turned out to be a revelation with his aggressive stance underneath the boards. He became an unheralded part of Alaska's starting unit when the team captured the PBA Grand Slam in 1996. He was awarded as the Most Improved Player of the Season and blossomed into one of the most dependable slotmen in the league.

He won Finals MVP in the 2000 All-Filipino finals as Alaska won the championship in 5 games.

=== Pop Cola Panthers ===
He was traded to Pop Cola, along with Johnny Abarrientos.

=== Coca-Cola Tigers ===
When Pop Cola disbanded, Juinio joined the Tigers. In 2002, he won the All-Filipino Cup, against his former team. His team also won the Reinforced Conference in 2003.

=== Talk 'N Text Phone Pals ===
After Juinio's contract expired in 2005, Talk 'N Text signed him. They released him the same year.

=== Return to Alaska franchise ===
Juinio returned to Alaska in the 2006-07 PBA season and won another championship in 2007 PBA Fiesta Conference. He retired after the 2007-08 PBA season at the age of 36.

== Coaching career ==
Juinio is currently an assistant coach for the UP Maroons. He has been with the team since 2013.

== National team ==
Juinio donned the national colors in the 1993 Southeast Asian Games.

== PBA career statistics ==
Legend
GP	Games played	MPG	Minutes per game
FG%	Field-goal percentage	3P%	3-point field-goal percentage	FT%	Free-throw percentage
RPG	Rebounds per game	APG	Assists per game	SPG	Steals per game
BPG	Blocks per game	PPG	Points per game	**Bold**	Career high

Year	Team	GP	MPG	FG%	3P%	FT%	RPG	APG	SPG	BPG	PPG
1994	Alaska	72	22.9	.513	.333	.648	4.6	.5	.1	.9	5.6
1995	Alaska	**73**	28.3	.520	.000	.672	5.5	.7	.2	1.0	6.1
1996	Alaska	72	25.5	.523	.000	.596	5.0	1.5	.2	1.0	5.8
1997	Alaska	60	17.6	.473	.000	.741	4.5	1.3	.2	.8	5.2
1998	Alaska	66	32.8	.560	.200	.601	**7.0**	1.7	.3	**1.5**	8.0
1999	Alaska	54	28.8	.510	.200	.671	6.5	1.9	.3	.9	6.7
2000	Alaska	49	29.1	**.514**	.000	.704	6.4	.8	.3	1.1	10.3
2001	Pop Cola	51	**37.0**	.482	.091	.702	6.3	**2.8**	**.6**	.8	**13.3**
2002	Coca-Cola	29	21.9	.402	.350	**.840**	3.9	1.7	.3	.7	7.8
2003	Coca-Cola	65	21.1	.390	.290	.606	3.9	1.7	.2	.6	7.4
2004-05	Coca-Cola	61	18.5	.414	.275	.746	3.0	1.6	.4	.3	6.1
2005-06	Coca-Cola/ Talk 'N Text	29	8.9	.327	**.417**	.571	2.4	.4	.1	.2	1.6
2006–07	Alaska	36	8.2	.415	.211	.781	1.7	.3	.3	.1	3.0
2007-08	Alaska	4	4.3	.333	.000	.000	.5	.3	.0	.0	.5
Career		721	24.5	.480	.286	.747	4.8	1.4	.3	.8	6.8
