= 1996 PBA Governors' Cup =

Third and last conference of the 1996 PBA season

- Duration: September 29 – December 17, 1996
- TV partner(s): Vintage Sports (IBC)

Finals
- Champions: Alaska Milkmen
- Runners-up: Ginebra San Miguel

Awards
- Best Player: Marlou Aquino (Ginebra San Miguel)
- Best Import: Sean Chambers (Alaska Milkmen)
- Finals MVP: Johnny Abarrientos (Alaska Milkmen)

PBA Governors' Cup chronology
- < 1995 1997 >

PBA conference chronology
- < 1996 Commissioner's 1997 All-Filipino >

The 1996 Philippine Basketball Association (PBA) Governors' Cup was the third and last conference of the 1996 PBA season. It started on September 29 and ended on December 17, 1996. The tournament is an import-laden format, which requires an import or a pure-foreign player for each team.

== Format ==
The following format will be observed for the duration of the conference:

- The teams were divided into 2 groups.

Group A:

1. Alaska Milkmen
2. Ginebra San Miguel
3. Purefoods Corned Beef Cowboys
4. Mobiline Cellulars

Group B:

1. Formula Shell Zoom Masters
2. San Miguel Beermen
3. Sta. Lucia Realtors
4. Sunkist Orange Bottlers

- Teams in a group will play against each other once and against teams in the other group twice; 11 games per team; Teams are then seeded by basis on win–loss records. Ties are broken among point differentials of the tied teams. Standings will be determined in one league table; teams do not qualify by basis of groupings.
- The top two teams will automatically qualify to the semifinals, while the next four teams will have a crossover quarterfinal round.
- Quarterfinals:
  - QF1: #3 vs. #6, with #3 having the twice-to-beat advantage
  - QF2: #4 vs. #5, with #4 having the twice-to-beat advantage
- Best-of-five semifinals:
  - SF1: QF1 vs. #4
  - SF2: QF2 vs. #3
- Third-place playoff: losers of the semifinals
- Best-of-seven finals: winners of the semifinals

== Elimination round ==
=== Team standings ===
| Pos | Team | W | L | PCT | GB | Qualification |
|---|---|---|---|---|---|---|
| 1 | Alaska Milkmen | 8 | 3 | .727 | — | Advance to semifinals |
| 2 | Ginebra San Miguel | 7 | 4 | .636 | 1 | Advance to semifinals |
| 3 | San Miguel Beermen | 6 | 5 | .545 (Note: Head-to-head record: San Miguel 1–0 Shell) | 2 | Twice-to-beat in quarterfinals |
| 4 | Formula Shell Zoom Masters | 6 | 5 | .545 | 2 | Twice-to-beat in quarterfinals |
| 5 | Sunkist Orange Bottlers | 5 | 6 | .455 (Note: Head-to-head quotient: Sunkist 1.066, Purefoods 0.986, Sta. Lucia 0.951; 6th-seed playoff: Purefoods 81–76 Sta. Lucia) | 3 | Twice-to-win in quarterfinals |
| 6 | Purefoods Corned Beef Cowboys | 5 | 6 | .455 | 3 | Twice-to-win in quarterfinals |
| 7 | Sta. Lucia Realtors | 5 | 6 | .455 | 3 | |
| 8 | Mobiline Cellulars | 2 | 9 | .182 | 6 | |

== Sixth seed playoff ==
Vintage

November 17

6th seed

Purefoods TJ Hotdogs 81, Sta. Lucia Realtors 76

Cuneta Astrodome, Pasay

== Bracket ==
Quarterfinals (Higher seeds twice-to-beat)
4 | Shell | 100 | 104
5 | Sunkist | 107 | 101
3 | San Miguel | 91* | 89
6 | Purefoods | 97 | 86

Semifinals (Best-of-5)
1 | Alaska | 3
4 | Shell | 0
2 | Ginebra | 3
3 | San Miguel | 1

Finals (Best-of-7)
1 | Alaska | 4
2 | Ginebra | 1
Third place
4 | Shell | 103
3 | San Miguel | 99

*Game went into overtime.

== Quarterfinals ==
Shell and San Miguel have a twice-to-beat advantage

=== (3) San Miguel vs. (6) Purefoods ===
Vintage

November 19

recap

San Miguel Beermen 91, Purefoods TJ Hotdogs 97 (OT)

Araneta Coliseum, Quezon City

Vintage

November 24

San Miguel Beermen 89, Purefoods TJ Hotdogs 86
San Miguel wins series in two games

Cuneta Astrodome, Pasay

=== (4) Shell vs. (5) Sunkist ===
Vintage

November 19

Formula Shell 100, Sunkist Orange Bottlers 107

Araneta Coliseum, Quezon City

Vintage

November 24

recap

Formula Shell 104, Sunkist Orange Bottlers 101
Shell wins series in two games

Cuneta Astrodome, Pasay

== Semifinals ==
=== (1) Alaska vs. (4) Shell ===
Vintage

November 26

recap

Alaska Milkmen 102, Formula Shell 83

Cuneta Astrodome, Pasay

Vintage

November 29

recap

Alaska Milkmen 106, Formula Shell 89

Araneta Coliseum, Quezon City

Vintage

December 1

Alaska Milkmen 100, Formula Shell 91
Alaska wins series, 3–0

Cuneta Astrodome, Pasay

=== (2) Ginebra vs. (3) San Miguel ===
Vintage

November 26

Ginebra San Miguel 88, San Miguel Beermen 94

Cuneta Astrodome, Pasay

Vintage

November 29

Ginebra San Miguel 115, San Miguel Beermen 111 (OT)

Araneta Coliseum, Quezon City

Vintage

December 1

recap

Ginebra San Miguel 94, San Miguel Beermen 93 (OT)

Cuneta Astrodome, Pasay

Vintage

December 3

recap

Ginebra San Miguel 122, San Miguel Beermen 106
Ginebra wins series, 3–1

Cuneta Astrodome, Pasay

== Third place playoff ==
Vintage

December 8

San Miguel Beermen 99, Formula Shell 103

Cuneta Astrodome, Pasay

== Finals ==
Vintage

December 8

Alaska Milkmen 90, Ginebra San Miguel 79

Cuneta Astrodome, Pasay

Vintage

December 10

Alaska Milkmen 110, Ginebra San Miguel 105

Cuneta Astrodome, Pasay

Vintage

December 13

Alaska Milkmen 95, Ginebra San Miguel 82

Araneta Coliseum, Quezon City

Vintage

December 15

Alaska Milkmen 96, Ginebra San Miguel 97

Cuneta Astrodome, Pasay

Vintage

December 17

Alaska Milkmen 91, Ginebra San Miguel 83
Alaska wins series, 4–1

Cuneta Astrodome, Pasay
