= 1996 Ginebra San Miguel season =

- Head coach: Robert Jaworski
- General manager: Ramon Carballo
- Owners: La Tondeña Distillers, Inc.

All Filipino Cup results
- Record: 12–12 (50%)
- Place: 4th
- Playoff finish: Semifinals

Commissioner's Cup results
- Record: 12–8 (60%)
- Place: 4th
- Playoff finish: Semifinals

Governors Cup results
- Record: 11–9 (55%)
- Place: 2nd
- Playoff finish: Runner-up

Ginebra San Miguel seasons

The 1996 Ginebra San Miguel season was the 18th season of the franchise in the Philippine Basketball Association (PBA).

== Draft pick ==
Round	Pick	Player	College
1	1	Marlou Aquino	Adamson

== Summary ==
Top draft pick Marlou Aquino debut with 29 points but Ginebra lost to Pepsi, 94–98, in their first game of the season on February 20. Ginebra tied the record for the longest losing streak of 18 games (first set by Presto back in 1980) since dropping their final 17 games last season and dating back to the last year's Commissioner's Cup. In their next game on February 23, Ginebra finally snapped out of the long, losing skein by nipping San Miguel, 100–99. The Ginebras lost three straight games and fell to one win and four losses before they ride high on a five-game winning roll. Their streak was stopped by Pepsi and they lost to Formula Shell on April 7 by one point, 84–85, on Ronnie Magsanoc's clutch-triple in the closing seconds. On April 14, Ginebra defeated Sta.Lucia, 73–70, for their seventh win and advances to the next round for the first time in four years. The Gins finish the eliminations with seven wins and seven losses. In the semifinal round, Ginebra won their first three outings before losing their next three games. They clinch a playoff for a finals berth by winning their last two matches against Shell and Purefoods. In the knockout game against Alaska on May 14 for the right to face Purefoods in the All-Filipino Cup finals, the Ginebras lost to the Milkmen, 83–96.

Import Henry James scored 48 points as Ginebra beats Mobiline, 117–107, in their first game in the Commissioners Cup on June 14. The Gins were tied with Sta.Lucia at the end of the eliminations with six wins and four losses behind Alaska's 8-2 won-loss slate. Ginebra won five of their first six games in the semifinals but Alaska got the first ticket to the finals by beating them, 102–98 on August 20, and Formula Shell earns a playoff by winning five games in the semifinals. On August 25, the Ginebras, which won over Shell in four previous meetings in the conference, lost in the playoff match to the Gas Kings, 86–89, as Shell import Kenny Redfield nailed a buzzer-beating triple with the huge crowd stunned in disbelief and the Ginebras were denied of a championship berth for the second time in the season.

Reggie Fox played nine games in the Governors Cup and a hamstring injury forces Ginebra to replace him with Fred Cofield going into their last two games in the eliminations. After two failed trips to the finals in the first two conferences, Ginebra finally advances into the championship round for the first time in five years by winning over the San Miguel Beermen, three games to one, in the best-of-five semifinal series. Ginebra went up against Grandslam-seeking Alaska Milkmen in the Governors Cup finals and lost in the title series in five games as the Milkmen achieved the distinction of winning a Grandslam.

== Notable dates ==
March 10: Jayvee Gayoso exploded with two big three-point shots in the last 20 seconds as Ginebra came back from a four-point deficit in the last two minutes to nip Alaska Milk, 97–96.

March 17: Ginebra limited Purefoods to only five points in the final 3:37 to pull off a stunning 102–86 victory. It was the Gins' third straight win in the All-Filipino Cup as they evened up their record to four wins and four defeats.

August 2: Henry James knock in two triples in the last two minutes as Ginebra whip Sta.Lucia Realtors, 99–92, and move up to second place at the start of the Commissioners Cup semifinal round.

August 4: Henry James buried two crucial three-pointers in the last 17 seconds to lift Ginebra past Formula Shell, 99–96, for its second straight semifinal victory. James' two triples, the last one was a 40-foot buzzer-beater that saved Ginebra from getting dragged into extension play.

== Roster ==
1996 Ginebra San Miguel roster
Players

Pos.	#	POB	Name	Height	Weight	DOB (YYYY–MM–DD)	From
G	1	(Philippines)	Bal David	5 ft 9 in (1.75 m)			UST
F	6	(Philippines)	Noli Locsin	6 ft 3 in (1.91 m)			De La Salle
G	7	(Philippines)	Robert Jaworski	6 ft 0 in (1.83 m)			UE
G	8	(Philippines)	Teroy Albarillo	5 ft 10 in (1.78 m)			Mindanao
F	9	(Philippines)	Macky De Joya	6 ft 3 in (1.91 m)			San Beda
G/F	11	(Philippines)	Jayvee Gayoso	6 ft 2 in (1.88 m)			Ateneo
G	12	(Philippines)	Vince Hizon	6 ft 2 in (1.88 m)			Ateneo
C	13	(Philippines)	Marlou Aquino	6 ft 9 in (2.06 m)			Adamson
G	15	(Philippines)	Michael Orquillas	6 ft 2 in (1.88 m)			Cebu
F	16	(Philippines)	Benny Cheng	6 ft 3 in (1.91 m)			Mapúa
F/C	18	(Philippines)	Wilmer Ong	6 ft 4 in (1.93 m)			USLS
G	25	(Philippines)	Pido Jarencio	5 ft 10 in (1.78 m)			UST
C	32 & 34	(Philippines)	EJ Feihl	7 ft 0 in (2.13 m)			Adamson
G	52	(Philippines)	Robert Jaworski, Jr.	6 ft 2 in (1.88 m)			Ateneo

Coaches

Head coach

- (Philippines) Robert Jaworski

Assistant coach(es)

- (Philippines) Rino Salazar
- (Philippines) Philip Cezar

Team manager

- (Philippines) Ramon Carballo

Legend

- (C) Team captain
- Injured

== Transactions ==
=== Rookie free agents ===
Player	Signed	Former team
Bal David	Off-season	N/A
Mike Orquillas	Off-season	N/A

=== Recruited imports ===
Tournament	Name	Number	Position	University/College	Duration
Commissioner's Cup	Henry James	45	Forward	Saint Mary's University, Texas	June 14 to August 27
Governors' Cup	Reggie Fox	3	Guard	University of Wyoming	October 1 to November 5
Governors' Cup	Fred Cofield	33	Guard	Eastern Michigan	November 10 to December 13
Governors' Cup	Derek Rucker	3	Guard	Davidson College	December 15–17
