= 1996 Purefoods Corned Beef Cowboys season =

- Head coach: Chot Reyes
- General manager: Simon Mossesgeld
- Owner: Purefoods Corporation

All Filipino Cup results
- Record: 15–12 (55.6%)
- Place: 2nd
- Playoff finish: Runner-up

Commissioner's Cup results
- Record: 7–12 (36.8%)
- Place: 5th
- Playoff finish: Semifinals

Governors' Cup results
- Record: 7–7 (50%)
- Place: 6th
- Playoff finish: Quarterfinals

Purefoods Corned Beef Cowboys seasons

The 1996 Purefoods Corned Beef Cowboys season was the 9th season of the franchise in the Philippine Basketball Association (PBA). The team was known as Purefoods Tender Juicy Hotdogs in the All-Filipino Cup and Commissioner's Cup.

== Draft picks ==
Round	Pick	Player	College
1	2	Rodney Santos	San Sebastian
1	3	Reuben dela Rosa	Mapua

== Finals stint ==
After missing out the All-Filipino finals for the first time last season, the Tender Juicy Hotdogs welcome back guard Dindo Pumaren on its fold and signed two promising rookies. Purefoods finish third in the eliminations behind Alaska and Formula Shell with eight wins and six losses. In the semifinal round, Purefoods racked up six straight victories to nailed the first finals seat, leaving Alaska and Ginebra, which earn a playoff by winning five games in the semifinals, to dispute the other slot. The Milkmen won over Ginebra in their playoff game.

In the All-Filipino Cup finals, Purefoods lost to Alaska Milkmen via a 4-1 count. It was the first time the Hotdogs lost in the best-of-seven title series in just five games. The Hotdogs had a chance to force a sixth game when they led by one point, 92–91, with 10.3 seconds to go in the extension period of Game five, but Bong Ravena committed a foul on Alaska's Jeffrey Cariaso with six-tenths of a second remaining, sending him to the free throw line where Cariaso sank the two decisive free throws for the win.

== Notable dates ==
February 27: The Hotdogs repulsed a rallying Ginebra, 100–92, for their first win in three games in the All-Filipino Cup in a match that saw tempers flaring between the fans of both teams.

April 30: In a slambang affair with both teams on a semifinal winning streaks with a three-game winning roll, Purefoods prevailed over Ginebra, 93–85, before an overflow crowd to complete a sweep in the first round of the All-Filipino Cup semifinals.

June 16: Ronnie Thompkins, the temperamental former Swift import now playing for Purefoods, displayed the same fearsome form that gave him a Best Import award three years ago, leading the Hotdogs' early attack as they overpowered a disoriented San Miguel Beermen, 108–87. Thompkins finished with 34 points as he outplayed San Miguel counterpart Agee Ward.

July 21: Purefoods poured its full might in the fourth quarter to eke out a convincing 88–78 victory over San Miguel Beermen and earn a playoff ticket for the fifth and last semifinal slot in the Commissioners Cup. The Hotdogs close out their elimination assignments at five wins and five losses while the Beermen were eliminated with a 4-6 won-loss record and joined Mobiline at the sidelines.

== Occurrences ==
Ronnie Thompkins was tested positive on drug used and saw action for the last time in Purefoods' 84–101 loss to Sta.Lucia in their first game in the semifinals on August 4. Thompkins' replacement was Derrick Gervin, a younger brother of NBA's prolific scorer George Gervin, he led the Hotdogs to just a lone win in the semifinals and later on was also found positive on drug test conducted by the PBA.

Six-year NBA veteran Dennis Hopson, who spent some time as Michael Jordan's backup with the Chicago Bulls in the NBA, blew into town as the import of Purefoods in the Governors Cup. Hopson went down with a foot injury before the conference started and Mark Anthony Hill played as a fill-in role while Hopson was recuperating and lasted three games, Hopson played only once in the Cowboys' 89–92 loss to San Miguel in Iloilo City on October 12.

Purefoods' import woes in the Governors Cup continues with Jojo English, a legitimate NBA veteran, replacing Hopson and also played one game before being sideline by an old injury, the coaching staff decided to keep him around but English never got a chance to play again. Tony Tolbert was the Cowboys’ fourth import and lasted two games and finally, unheralded Kennard Winchester, their fifth reinforcement, played well and help the Cowboys get back and were able to qualify in the quarterfinal round by defeating Sta.Lucia in their playoff game on November 17.

== Roster ==
1996 Purefoods Corned Beef Cowboys roster
Players

Pos.	#	POB	Name	Height	Weight	DOB (YYYY–MM–DD)	From
G/F	1	(Philippines)	Bong Ravena	6 ft 2 in (1.88 m)	195 lb (88 kg)		UE
F	5	(Philippines)	Edmund Reyes	6 ft 3 in (1.91 m)	198 lb (90 kg)		UST
F	7	(Philippines)	Rey Evangelista	6 ft 4 in (1.93 m)	180 lb (82 kg)		UST
G/F	9	(Philippines)	Rodney Santos	6 ft 2 in (1.88 m)	175 lb (79 kg)		San Sebastian
G	10	(Philippines)	Dindo Pumaren	5 ft 9 in (1.75 m)	170 lb (77 kg)		De La Salle
G/F	12	(Philippines)	Glenn Capacio	6 ft 1 in (1.85 m)	185 lb (84 kg)		Far Eastern
F/C	15	(Philippines)	Bryant Punsalan	6 ft 6 in (1.98 m)	210 lb (95 kg)		Far Eastern
F	16	(Philippines)	Alvin Patrimonio	6 ft 3 in (1.91 m)	215 lb (98 kg)		Mapúa
G	17	(Philippines)	Olsen Racela	5 ft 11 in (1.80 m)	165 lb (75 kg)		Ateneo
F	23	(Philippines)	Reuben Dela Rosa	6 ft 2 in (1.88 m)	190 lb (86 kg)		Mapúa
F		(Philippines)	Jojo Martin	6 ft 3 in (1.91 m)			NCBA
C	44	(Philippines)	Jerry Codiñera	6 ft 5 in (1.96 m)	245 lb (111 kg)		UE

Coaches
Head coach
- (Philippines) Chot Reyes
Assistant(s)
- (Philippines) Eric Altamirano

Legend
- (DP) Unsigned draft pick
- (FA) Free agent
- (S) Suspended
- Injured

== Transactions ==
=== Trades ===
Off-season	To Pepsi Jack Tanuan	To Purefoods Dindo Pumaren

=== Additions ===
Player	Signed	Former team
Bryant Punsalan	Off-season	San Miguel Beermen

=== Recruited imports ===
Tournament	Name	Number	Position	University/College	Duration
Commissioner's Cup	Ronnie Thompkins	00	Forward-Center	Fort Hays State	June 16 to August 4
Commissioner's Cup	Derrick Gervin	8	Forward-Guard	University of Texas	August 6–23
Governors' Cup	Mark Hill	2	Guard	Cal State Fullerton	October 1–8
Governors' Cup	Dennis Hopson		Guard	Ohio State	October 12 (one game)
Governors' Cup	Jojo English	42	Guard	South Carolina	October 20 (one game)
Governors' Cup	Tony Tolbert	4	Forward-Guard	Detroit Mercy	October 25–27
Governors' Cup	Kennard Winchester	41	Guard-Forward	Averett College	November 3–24
