= 1996 PBA Commissioner's Cup =

Second conference of the 1996 PBA season

- Duration: June 14 – September 10, 1996
- TV partner(s): Vintage Sports (IBC)

Finals
- Champions: Alaska Milkmen
- Runners-up: Formula Shell Zoom Masters

Awards
- Best Player: Johnny Abarrientos (Alaska Milkmen)
- Best Import: Kenny Redfield (Formula Shell Zoom Masters)
- Finals MVP: Bong Hawkins (Alaska Milkmen)

PBA Commissioner's Cup chronology
- < 1995 1997 >

PBA conference chronology
- < 1996 All-Filipino 1996 Governors' >

The 1996 Philippine Basketball Association (PBA) Commissioner's Cup was the second conference of the 1996 PBA season. It started on June 14 and ended on September 10, 1996. The tournament is an import-laden format, which requires an import or a pure-foreign player for each team with a 6'7" height limit.

== Format ==
The following format will be observed for the duration of the conference:

- The teams were divided into 2 groups.

Group A:

1. Alaska Milkmen
2. Ginebra San Miguel
3. Formula Shell Zoom Masters
4. Mobiline Cellulars

Group B:

1. Purefoods TJ Hotdogs
2. San Miguel Beermen
3. Sta. Lucia Realtors
4. Sunkist Orange Bottlers

- Teams in a group will play against each other once and against teams in the other group twice; 10 games per team; Teams are then seeded by basis on win–loss records. Ties are broken among point differentials of the tied teams. Standings will be determined in one league table; teams do not qualify by basis of groupings.
- The top five teams after the eliminations will advance to the semifinals.
- Semifinals will be two round robin affairs with the remaining five teams. Results from the eliminations will be carried over. A playoff incentive for a finals berth will be given to the team that will win at least five of their eight semifinal games.
- The top two teams (or the top team and the winner of the playoff incentive) will face each other in a best-of-seven championship series. The next two teams (or the loser of the playoff incentive and the fourth seeded team) dispute the third-place trophy in a one-game playoff.

== Elimination round ==
=== Team standings ===
Pos	Team	W	L	PCT	GB	Qualification
1	Alaska Milkmen	8	2	.800	—	Semifinal round
2	Ginebra San Miguel	6	4	.600 (Note: Head-to-head record: Ginebra 1–0 Sta. Lucia)	2	Semifinal round
3	Sta. Lucia Realtors	6	4	.600	2	Semifinal round
4	Formula Shell Zoom Masters	5	5	.500 (Note: Head-to-head quotient: Shell 1.170, Purefoods 1.050, Sunkist 0.861; semifinal round berth playoff: Purefoods 89–76 Sunkist)	3	Semifinal round
5	Purefoods Tender Juicy Hotdogs	5	5	.500	3	Semifinal round
6	Sunkist Orange Juicers	5	5	.500	3	
7	San Miguel Beermen	4	6	.400	4	
8	Mobiline Cellulars	1	9	.100	7	

== Semifinal round berth playoff ==
Vintage

July 30

5th seed

Purefoods TJ Hotdogs 89, Sunkist Orange Bottlers 76

Cuneta Astrodome, Pasay

== Semifinal round ==
=== Team standings ===
Overall standings
Pos	Team	W	L	PCT	GB	Qualification
1	Alaska Milkmen	14	4	.778	—	Advance to the finals (Note: If a team outside the top two teams wins at least five semifinal round games, then it and the second-placed team will playoff for the last finals berth; otherwise, the top 2 teams qualify outright.)
2	Ginebra San Miguel	12	6	.667	2	Guaranteed finals berth playoff
3	Formula Shell Zoom Masters	10	8	.556	4	Qualify to finals berth playoff
4	Sta. Lucia Realtors	8	10	.444	6	Proceed to third place playoff
5	Purefoods Tender Juicy Hotdogs	6	12	.333	8	

Notes:

Semifinal round standings
Pos	Team	W	L	Qualification
1	Alaska Milkmen	6	2	
2	Ginebra San Miguel	6	2	
3	Formula Shell Zoom Masters	5	3	Qualify to finals berth playoff (Note: Alaska advanced to the finals outright as #1 seeded team, Ginebra guaranteed finals berth playoff as #2 seeded team; finals berth playoff: Shell 89–86 Ginebra)
4	Sta. Lucia Realtors	2	6	
5	Purefoods Tender Juicy Hotdogs	1	7	

== Finals berth playoff ==
Vintage

August 25

Formula Shell 89, Ginebra San Miguel 86

Cuneta Astrodome, Pasay

Bal David sank a three-point shot, putting the Gins on with the lead, 86–83 with 17 seconds left in the game. Richie Ticson however also made a three pointer tying the game again, 86-all with 10.5 seconds left.

After calling a timeout to design the last play, Henry James opted to try a three pointer after an inbound pass from Vince Hizon. James' shot was blocked by Benjie Paras and picked up by Kenny Redfield, making a buzzer beating three point shot, thus winning the game for them, 89–86.

== Third place playoff ==
Vintage

August 27

Ginebra San Miguel 106, Sta. Lucia Realtors 111

Cuneta Astrodome, Pasay

== Finals ==
Vintage

August 27

Alaska Milkmen 82, Formula Shell 85

Cuneta Astrodome, Pasay

Vintage

August 30

Alaska Milkmen 93, Formula Shell 86

Araneta Coliseum, Quezon City

Vintage

September 1

Alaska Milkmen 77, Formula Shell 85

Cuneta Astrodome, Pasay

Vintage

September 3

Alaska Milkmen 79, Formula Shell 76

Cuneta Astrodome, Pasay

Vintage

September 6

Alaska Milkmen 70, Formula Shell 63

Araneta Coliseum, Quezon City

Vintage

September 8

Alaska Milkmen 85, Formula Shell 88

Cuneta Astrodome, Pasay

Vintage

September 10

Alaska Milkmen 83, Formula Shell 77
Alaska wins series, 4–3

Cuneta Astrodome, Pasay
