= 1996 PBA season =

22nd PBA season

- Duration: February 18 – December 17, 1996
- Teams: 8
- TV partner: VTV (IBC)

1996 PBA Draft
- Top draft pick: Marlou Aquino
- Picked by: Ginebra San Miguel
- Season MVP: Johnny Abarrientos (Alaska Milkmen)
- All-Filipino Cup champions: Alaska Milkmen
- All-Filipino Cup runners-up: Purefoods TJ Hotdogs
- Commissioner's Cup champions: Alaska Milkmen
- Commissioner's Cup runners-up: Formula Shell Zoom Masters
- Governors Cup champions: Alaska Milkmen
- Governors Cup runners-up: Ginebra San Miguel

Seasons
- ← 1995 1997 →

The 1996 PBA season was the 22nd season of the Philippine Basketball Association (PBA).

== Board of governors ==
=== Executive committee ===
- Jun Bernardino (Commissioner)
- Teodoro L. Dimayuga (Chairman, representing Purefoods TJ Hotdogs)
- Nazario L. Avendaño (Vice-Chairman, representing San Miguel Beermen)
- Dr. Antonio V. Concepcion (Treasurer, representing Ginebra San Miguel)

=== Teams ===
Team	Company	Governor	Alternate Governor
Alaska Milkmen	Alaska Milk Corporation	Wilfred Steven Uytengsu	Joaquin Trillo
Formula Shell Zoommasters	Pilipinas Shell Petroleum Corporation	Reynaldo Gamboa	Eliseo Santiago
Ginebra San Miguel	La Tondeña Distillers, Inc.	Dr. Antonio Concepcion	Bernabe Navarro, Jr.
Pepsi Mega/Mobiline Cellulars	Lapanday Holdings Corporation	Luis F. Lorenzo	
Purefoods Tender Juicy Hotdogs	Purefoods Corporation	Teodoro Dimayuga	Eliezer Capacio
San Miguel Beermen	San Miguel Corporation	Nazario Avendaño	Eddie Veneracion
Sta. Lucia Realtors	Sta. Lucia Realty and Development Corporation	Manuel Encarnado	Vicente Santos
Sunkist Orange Juicers	RFM Corporation	Elmer Yanga	Aurora Timbol

== Season highlights ==
- The league's broadcast partner, Vintage Sports, switched networks from People's Television to Intercontinental Broadcasting Corporation. They also changed their primary language from English to Tagalog.
- Crowd-favorite Ginebra San Miguel return to their winning ways after years of being a doormat with the entry of top draft pick, 6-9 Marlou Aquino, the Ginebras advances in the semifinals for the first time in three years during the All-Filipino Cup, their season was highlighted by a finals trip in the third conference, losing to grandslam champions Alaska Milkmen.
- The Pepsi Mega Bottlers sold their franchise to PILTEL and was renamed Mobiline Cellulars at the start of the Commissioner's Cup.
- The Alaska Milkmen became the fourth team to win the PBA Grand slam by sweeping all three conferences of the season, joining the 1976 and 1983 Crispa Redmanizers and the 1989 San Miguel Beermen.
- Johnny Abarrientos became the first pure guard to win the Most Valuable Player (MVP) award since Ricardo Brown in 1985.

== Opening ceremonies ==
The muses for the participating teams are as follows:

Team	Muse
Alaska Milkmen	Anamarie Pukon and Sharon Fuentes
Formula Shell	Teresa Herrera
Ginebra San Miguel	Amanda Page
Pepsi Mega	Maricel Morales (Mutya ng Pilipinas)
Purefoods Tender Juicy Hotdogs	Chantal Umali
San Miguel Beermen	Candice Coral and Gracia
Sta. Lucia Realtors	Cara Sobejano and Abigail Arenas
Sunkist Orange Juicers	Vina Morales

== Champions ==
- All-Filipino Cup: Alaska Milkmen
- Commissioner's Cup: Alaska Milkmen
- Governor's Cup: Alaska Milkmen
- Team with best win–loss percentage: Alaska Milkmen (51-21, .708)
- Best Team of the Year: Alaska Milkmen (1st)

== All-Filipino Cup ==
=== Elimination round ===
Pos	Team	W	L	PCT	GB	Qualification
1	Alaska Milkmen	10	4	.714	—	Semifinal round
2	Formula Shell Zoom Masters	9	5	.643	1	Semifinal round
3	Purefoods Tender Juicy Hotdogs	8	6	.571	2	Semifinal round
4	San Miguel Beermen	8	6	.571	2	Semifinal round
5	Ginebra San Miguel	7	7	.500	3	Semifinal round
6	Sta. Lucia Realtors	6	8	.429	4	
7	Sunkist Orange Juicers	4	10	.286	6	
8	Pepsi Mega Bottlers	4	10	.286	6	

=== Semifinal round ===
Overall standings
Pos	Team	W	L	PCT	GB	Qualification
1	Purefoods Tender Juicy Hotdogs	14	8	.636	—	Advance to the finals (Note: If a team outside the top two teams wins at least five semifinal round games, then it and the second-placed team will playoff for the last finals berth; otherwise, the top 2 teams qualify outright.)
2	Alaska Milkmen	13	9	.591	1	Guaranteed finals berth playoff
3	Ginebra San Miguel	12	10	.545 (Note: Head-to-head record: Ginebra 3–1 San Miguel)	2	Qualify to finals berth playoff
4	San Miguel Beermen	12	10	.545	2	Proceed to third place playoff
5	Formula Shell Zoom Masters	11	11	.500	3	

Notes:

Semifinal round standings
Pos	Team	W	L	Qualification
1	Purefoods Tender Juicy Hotdogs	6	2	
2	Ginebra San Miguel	5	3	Qualify to finals berth playoff (Note: Purefoods qualified outright as #1 seeded team; finals berth playoff: Alaska 96–83 Ginebra)
3	San Miguel Beermen	4	4	
4	Alaska Milkmen	3	5	
5	Formula Shell Zoom Masters	2	6	

=== Third place playoff ===
Team 1	Score	Team 2
(3) Ginebra San Miguel	99–100	(4) San Miguel Beermen

=== Finals ===
Team 1	Series	Team 2	Game 1	Game 2	Game 3	Game 4	Game 5	Game 6	Game 7
(1) Purefoods Tender Juicy Hotdogs	1–4	(2) Alaska Milkmen	77–78	79–86	99–87	62–75	92–93 (OT)	—	—

- Finals MVP: Jojo Lastimosa (Alaska)
- Best Player of the Conference: Alvin Patrimonio (Purefoods)

== Commissioner's Cup ==
=== Elimination round ===
Pos	Team	W	L	PCT	GB	Qualification
1	Alaska Milkmen	8	2	.800	—	Semifinal round
2	Ginebra San Miguel	6	4	.600 (Note: Head-to-head record: Ginebra 1–0 Sta. Lucia)	2	Semifinal round
3	Sta. Lucia Realtors	6	4	.600	2	Semifinal round
4	Formula Shell Zoom Masters	5	5	.500 (Note: Head-to-head quotient: Shell 1.170, Purefoods 1.050, Sunkist 0.861; semifinal round berth playoff: Purefoods 89–76 Sunkist)	3	Semifinal round
5	Purefoods Tender Juicy Hotdogs	5	5	.500	3	Semifinal round
6	Sunkist Orange Juicers	5	5	.500	3	
7	San Miguel Beermen	4	6	.400	4	
8	Mobiline Cellulars	1	9	.100	7	

=== Semifinal round ===
Overall standings
Pos	Team	W	L	PCT	GB	Qualification
1	Alaska Milkmen	14	4	.778	—	Advance to the finals (Note: If a team outside the top two teams wins at least five semifinal round games, then it and the second-placed team will playoff for the last finals berth; otherwise, the top 2 teams qualify outright.)
2	Ginebra San Miguel	12	6	.667	2	Guaranteed finals berth playoff
3	Formula Shell Zoom Masters	10	8	.556	4	Qualify to finals berth playoff
4	Sta. Lucia Realtors	8	10	.444	6	Proceed to third place playoff
5	Purefoods Tender Juicy Hotdogs	6	12	.333	8	

Notes:

Semifinal round standings
Pos	Team	W	L	Qualification
1	Alaska Milkmen	6	2	
2	Ginebra San Miguel	6	2	
3	Formula Shell Zoom Masters	5	3	Qualify to finals berth playoff (Note: Alaska advanced to the finals outright as #1 seeded team, Ginebra guaranteed finals berth playoff as #2 seeded team; finals berth playoff: Shell 89–86 Ginebra)
4	Sta. Lucia Realtors	2	6	
5	Purefoods Tender Juicy Hotdogs	1	7	

=== Third place playoff ===
Team 1	Score	Team 2
(2) Ginebra San Miguel	106–111	(4) Sta. Lucia Realtors

=== Finals ===
Team 1	Series	Team 2	Game 1	Game 2	Game 3	Game 4	Game 5	Game 6	Game 7
(1) Alaska Milkmen	4–3	(3) Formula Shell Zoom Masters	82–85	93–86	77–85	79–76	70–63	85–88	83–77

- Finals MVP: Bong Hawkins (Alaska)
- Best Player of the Conference: Bong Hawkins (Alaska)
- Best Import of the Conference: Ken Redfield (Formula Shell)

== Governors' Cup ==
=== Elimination round ===
Pos	Team	W	L	PCT	GB	Qualification
1	Alaska Milkmen	8	3	.727	—	Advance to semifinals
2	Ginebra San Miguel	7	4	.636	1	Advance to semifinals
3	San Miguel Beermen	6	5	.545 (Note: Head-to-head record: San Miguel 1–0 Shell)	2	Twice-to-beat in quarterfinals
4	Formula Shell Zoom Masters	6	5	.545	2	Twice-to-beat in quarterfinals
5	Sunkist Orange Bottlers	5	6	.455 (Note: Head-to-head quotient: Sunkist 1.066, Purefoods 0.986, Sta. Lucia 0.951; 6th-seed playoff: Purefoods 81–76 Sta. Lucia)	3	Twice-to-win in quarterfinals
6	Purefoods Corned Beef Cowboys	5	6	.455	3	Twice-to-win in quarterfinals
7	Sta. Lucia Realtors	5	6	.455	3	
8	Mobiline Cellulars	2	9	.182	6	

=== Playoffs ===
Quarterfinals (Higher seeds twice-to-beat)
4	Shell	100	104
5	Sunkist	107	101
3	San Miguel	91*	89
6	Purefoods	97	86

Semifinals (Best-of-5)
1	Alaska	3
4	Shell	0
2	Ginebra	3
3	San Miguel	1

Finals (Best-of-7)
1	Alaska	4
2	Ginebra	1
Third place
4	Shell	103
3	San Miguel	99

*Game went into overtime.

==== Quarterfinals ====
Team 1	Series	Team 2	Game 1	Game 2
(3) San Miguel Beermen*	1–1	(6) Purefoods Corned Beef Cowboys	91–97 (OT)	89–86
(4) Formula Shell Zoom Masters*	1–1	(5) Sunkist Orange Bottlers	100–107	104–101

*Team has twice-to-beat advantage. Team 1 only has to win once, while Team 2 has to win twice.

==== Semifinals ====
Team 1	Series	Team 2	Game 1	Game 2	Game 3	Game 4	Game 5
(1) Alaska Milkmen	3–0	(4) Formula Shell Zoom Masters	102–83	106–89	100–91	—	—
(2) Ginebra San Miguel	3–1	(3) San Miguel Beermen	88–94	115–111 (OT)	94–93 (OT)	122–106	—

==== Third place playoff ====
Team 1	Score	Team 2
(3) San Miguel Beermen	99–103	(4) Formula Shell Zoom Masters

==== Finals ====
Team 1	Series	Team 2	Game 1	Game 2	Game 3	Game 4	Game 5	Game 6	Game 7
(1) Alaska Milkmen	4–1	(2) Ginebra San Miguel	90–79	110–105	95–82	96–97	91–83	—	—

- Finals MVP: Johnny Abarrientos (Alaska)
- Best Player of the Conference: Marlou Aquino (Ginebra)
- Best Import of the Conference: Sean Chambers (Alaska)

== Awards ==
- Most Valuable Player: Johnny Abarrientos (Alaska)
- Rookie of the Year: Marlou Aquino (Ginebra)
- Sportsmanship Award: Jerry Codiñera (Purefoods)
- Most Improved Player: Edward "Poch" Juinio (Alaska)
- Defensive Player of the Year: Marlou Aquino (Ginebra)
- Mythical Five:
  - Johnny Abarrientos (Alaska)
  - Rene Hawkins, Jr. (Alaska)
  - Jojo Lastimosa (Alaska)
  - Alvin Patrimonio (Purefoods)
  - Marlou Aquino (Ginebra)
- Mythical Second Team:
  - Bal David (Ginebra)
  - Noli Locsin (Ginebra)
  - Jeffrey Cariaso (Alaska)
  - Benjie Paras (Shell)
  - Nelson Asaytono (San Miguel)
- All Defensive Team:
  - Jerry Codiñera (Purefoods)
  - Chris Jackson (Sta. Lucia)
  - Johnny Abarrientos (Alaska)
  - Jeffrey Cariaso (Alaska)
  - Marlou Aquino (Ginebra)

=== Awards given by the PBA Press Corps ===
- Coach of the Year: Tim Cone (Alaska)
- Mr. Quality Minutes: Gilbert "Jun" Reyes, Jr. (Alaska)
- Executive of the Year: Jun Bernardino (PBA Commissioner)
- Comeback Player of the Year: Richie Ticzon (Shell)
- Referee of the Year: Ogie Bernarte

== Cumulative standings ==
Pos	Team	Pld	W	L	PCT	Best finish
1	Alaska Milkmen	72	51	21	.708	Champions
2	Ginebra San Miguel	64	35	29	.547	Finalist
3	Formula Shell Zoom Masters	65	33	32	.508	Finalist
4	Purefoods TJ Hotdogs/Corned Beef Cowboys	60	29	31	.483	Finalist
5	San Miguel Beermen	51	25	26	.490	Third place
6	Sta. Lucia Realtors	45	20	25	.444	Third place
7	Sunkist Orange Juicers/Bottlers	38	15	23	.395	Quarterfinalist
8	Pepsi Mega Bottlers/Mobiline Cellulars	35	7	28	.200	Elimination round

=== Elimination round ===
Pos	Team	Pld	W	L	PCT
1	Alaska Milkmen	35	26	9	.743
2	Ginebra San Miguel	35	20	15	.571
3	Formula Shell Zoom Masters	35	20	15	.571
4	Purefoods TJ Hotdogs/Corned Beef Cowboys	35	18	17	.514
5	San Miguel Beermen	35	18	17	.514
6	Sta. Lucia Realtors	35	17	18	.486
7	Sunkist Orange Juicers/Bottlers	35	14	21	.400
8	Pepsi Mega BottlersMobiline Cellulars	35	7	28	.200

=== Playoffs ===
Pos	Team	Pld	W	L
1	Alaska Milkmen	37	25	12
2	Ginebra San Miguel	29	15	14
3	Formula Shell Zoom Masters	30	13	17
4	Purefoods TJ Hotdogs/Corned Beef Cowboys	25	11	14
5	San Miguel Beermen	16	7	9
6	Sta. Lucia Realtors	10	3	7
7	Sunkist Orange Juicers/Bottlers	3	1	2
8	Pepsi Mega BottlersMobiline Cellulars	0	0	0
