= 1996 Formula Shell Zoom Masters season =

- Head coach: Chito Narvasa
- General Manager: Jaime Aizon
- Owner(s): Pilipinas Shell Petroleum

All Filipino Cup results
- Record: 11–11 (50%)
- Place: 5th
- Playoff finish: Semifinals

Commissioner's Cup results
- Record: 14–12 (53.8%)
- Place: 2nd
- Playoff finish: Runner-up

Governor's Cup results
- Record: 8–9 (47.1%)
- Place: 3rd
- Playoff finish: Semifinals

Formula Shell Zoom Masters seasons

The 1996 Formula Shell Zoom Masters season was the 12th season of the franchise in the Philippine Basketball Association (PBA).

== Draft pick ==
Round	Pick	Player	College
2	11	Rommel Santos	College of Staten Island

== Summary ==
Formula Shell were off to a rousing start by beating defending champion Sunkist in their first game, 109-95 on February 20. The Zoom Masters won their first four games in the All-Filipino Cup. They finish second in the eliminations with nine wins and five losses and a game behind leader Alaska Milkmen. The Zoom Masters won their first two games in the semifinals but skidded in their last six outings, losing all their remaining matches and dropped to fifth place.

Import Kenny Redfield moved over to Formula Shell after his former team Purefoods decided not to rehire his services in the Commissioners Cup and opted for former Swift import Ronnie Thompkins instead. The Zoom Masters lost their first two games before picking up their first win against Purefoods, 89-81 on June 23. The Zoom Masters were the fourth team to make it to the next round with the higher quotient over two other teams following a 97-78 win over Sunkist on the last day of the eliminations on July 23. Entering the semifinal round with five victories against five defeats, Shell won five of their eight assignments to earn a playoff for the second finals berth against Ginebra San Miguel, a team which they haven't beaten in four outings in the Conference.

On August 25 in a do-or-die game for the right to meet Alaska Milkmen in the Commissioners Cup finals, the Zoom Masters trailed, 83–86 with 17 seconds left in the ballgame, Shell's mid-season acquisition Richie Ticzon tied the count at 86-all with his own triple after Bal David earlier broke the 83-all standoff by hitting a three-pointer that gave Ginebra a three-point edge. The Ginebras called a timeout with 10.5 seconds left and on the next possession, Ginebra import Henry James almost losses the ball but was able to recovered and attempted a three-pointer which was swatted by Benjie Paras, the ball went into Kenny Redfield's hands as they raced down the court, Redfield converted a desperation triple that went in at the final buzzer, giving Shell a stunning 89-86 win and shocked the pre-dominantly Ginebra crowd. Formula Shell enters the finals for the first time since 1992 and in the championship series against Alaska, the underdog Shell squad continued to defied the odds by winning Games One and Three and taking a two games to one advantage. The championship savvy Alaska Milkmen eventually won in the deciding match of a tough seven-game series as they stave off a late, furious Shell rally to win by six points.

Resident import Bobby Parks led Shell to six wins in 10 games he played in the Governors Cup. Parks was sidelined with a fractured left foot incurred in the Zoom Masters' 70-84 loss to Purefoods on November 10. Shell was importless in their next two games which they lost to Alaska in the last playing date of the eliminations on November 15 and Sunkist in their quarterfinal playoffs. Replacing the injured Parks was former Purefoods import Tharon Mayes. Formula Shell made it to the best-of-five semifinals against Alaska by winning over Sunkist, 104-102, in their knockout game on November 24. Mayes was outplayed by Sean Chambers in the semifinal series and the Zoom Masters were swept in three games by the Grandslam-seeking Alaska Milkmen.

== Notable dates ==
February 27: Shell held the San Miguel Beermen scoreless in the first four minutes of the third quarter and led by as many as 18 points to coast an easy 89-79 victory for their third straight win and the solo lead in the All-Filipino Cup.

July 12: Shell outsteadied Alaska down the stretch to eke out a hard-earned 82-79 victory and snapped the Milkmen's winning roll at six and handed their first loss in the Commissioners Cup.

August 25: Kenny Redfield struck with a three-point shot in the final second as Formula Shell repulsed Ginebra San Miguel, 89-86, to earn the right to challenge Alaska Milk for the Commissioners Cup championship. A key block by Shell center Benjie Paras off Ginebra import Henry James paved the way for Redfield's winning trey.

== Roster ==
1996 Formula Shell Zoom Masters roster
Players

Pos.	#	POB	Name	Height	Weight	DOB (YYYY–MM–DD)	From
G	00	(United States)	Rommel Santos	5 ft 11 in (1.80 m)	180 lb (82 kg)		Staten Island
G	5	(Philippines)	Ronnie Magsanoc	5 ft 9 in (1.75 m)	155 lb (70 kg)		Philippines
F	6	(Philippines)	Joey Guanio	6 ft 2 in (1.88 m)	185 lb (84 kg)		Philippines
F	8	(Philippines)	Jojo Lim	6 ft 3 in (1.91 m)	186 lb (84 kg)		Visayas
G	10	(Philippines)	Richie Ticzon	5 ft 8 in (1.73 m)	150 lb (68 kg)		Ateneo
F	11	(Philippines)	Peter Naron	6 ft 3 in (1.91 m)	185 lb (84 kg)		Visayas
F	12	(Philippines)	Porferio Marzan	6 ft 2 in (1.88 m)	180 lb (82 kg)		Baguio
C	14	(Philippines)	Benjie Paras	6 ft 5 in (1.96 m)	215 lb (98 kg)		Philippines
F	15	(Philippines)	Romulo Orillosa	6 ft 2 in (1.88 m)	180 lb (82 kg)		Adamson
F	17	(Philippines)	Terry Saldaña	6 ft 3 in (1.91 m)	190 lb (86 kg)		Letran
G/F	20	(Philippines)	Elmer Lago	6 ft 3 in (1.91 m)	188 lb (85 kg)		De La Salle
C	32	(Philippines)	Jolly Escobar	6 ft 5 in (1.96 m)	200 lb (91 kg)		UE
F/C	33	(Philippines)	Victor Pablo	6 ft 4 in (1.93 m)	198 lb (90 kg)		Far Eastern

Coaches
Head coach
- (Philippines) Chito Narvasa
Assistant(s)
- (Philippines) Perry Ronquillo

Legend
- (DP) Unsigned draft pick
- (FA) Free agent
- (S) Suspended
- Injured

== Transactions ==
=== Additions ===
Player	Signed	Former team
Alejandro Lim	Off-season	Purefoods
Peter Naron	Off-season	Purefoods
Richie Ticzon	June 1996	Purefoods

=== Recruited imports ===
Tournament	Name	Number	Position	University/College	Duration
Commissioner's Cup	Kenny Redfield	3	Forward	Michigan State	June 16 to September 10
Governors' Cup	Bobby Parks	22	Forward	Memphis State	October 1 to November 10
Governors' Cup	Tharon Mayes	25	Guard-Forward	Florida State	November 24 to December 8
