= List of Magnolia Chicken Timplados Hotshots seasons =

The Magnolia Chicken Timplados Hotshots joined the Philippine Basketball Association (PBA) in 1988 following the acquisition of the Tanduay Rhum Makers franchise of Elizalde & Company, Inc. by Pure Foods Corporation. The team began play as the Purefoods Hotdogs in the 1988 PBA season.

== Records per conference ==
Grand Slam champion	Conference champions	Conference runners-up	Conference third-place/semifinalists

=== Three-conference era (1988–2003) ===
Season	Conference	Team name	Elimination round						Playoffs	
Season	Conference	Team name	Finish	GP	W	L	PCT	GB	Stage	Results
1988	Open Conference	Purefoods Hotdogs	3rd/6	10	6	4	.600	1	Semifinals; Finals	Tied 1st overall (12–6), 6–2 in semifinals San Miguel 4, Purefoods 3
1988	All-Filipino Cup	Purefoods Hotdogs	1st/6	12	8	4	.667	–	Semifinals; Finals	1st overall (13–7), 5–3 in semifinals Añejo Rum 65ers 3, Purefoods 1
1988	Third Conference	Purefoods Hotdogs	6th/6	10	1	9	.100	6	Did not qualify	
1989	Open Conference	Purefoods Hotdogs	4th/6	10	4	6	.400	6	Semifinals	5th overall (7–11), 3–5 in semifinals
1989	All-Filipino Cup	Purefoods Hotdogs	1st/6	11	9	2	.919	–	Semifinals; Finals	1st overall (14–5), 5–3 in semifinals San Miguel 4, Purefoods 2
1989	Reinforced Conference	Purefoods Hotdogs	2nd/6	10	6	4	.600	–	Semifinals; Finals berth playoff	Tied 2nd overall (10–8), 4–4 in semifinals Añejo 113, Purefoods 112*
1990	First Conference	Purefoods Hotdogs	6th/8	10	3	7	.300	5	Did not qualify	
1990	All-Filipino Cup	Purefoods Hotdogs	2nd/8	10	7	3	.700	3	Semifinals; Finals	1st overall (13–5), 6–2 in semifinals Presto 4, Purefoods 3
1990	Third Conference	Purefoods Hotdogs	4th/8	10	6	4	.600	2	Semifinals; Finals seed playoff Finals	Tied 2nd overall (11–7), 5–3 in semifinals Purefoods 121, Shell 101*; Purefoods 3, Alaska 2
1991	First Conference	Purefoods Tender Juicy Hotdogs	3rd/8	11	6	5	.545	2	Semifinals; 3rd-place playoff	3rd overall (10–9), 4–4 in semifinals Diet Sarsi 3, Purefoods 0
1991	All-Filipino Cup	Purefoods Tender Juicy Hotdogs	2nd/8	11	7	4	.636	1	Semifinals; Finals	1st overall (12–7), 5–3 in semifinals Purefoods 3, Sarsi 2
1991	Third Conference	Purefoods Tender Juicy Hotdogs	8th/8	11	2	9	.182	6	Did not qualify	
1992	First Conference	Purefoods Tender Juicy Hotdogs	6th/8	11	5	6	.455	2	Elimination playoff	Swift 123, Purefoods 117*
1992	All-Filipino Cup	Purefoods Tender Juicy Hotdogs	1st/8	10	8	2	.800	–	Semifinals; Finals berth playoff Finals	Tied 2nd overall (12–6), 4–4 in semifinals Purefoods 81, 7-Up 77*; San Miguel 4, Purefoods 3
1992	Third Conference	Purefoods Tender Juicy Hotdogs	5th/8	11	5	6	.455	4	Elimination playoff Semifinals	Purefoods 119, Alaska 110*; 5th overall (6–13), 1–7 in semifinals
1993	All-Filipino Cup	Coney Island Ice Cream Stars	3rd/8	10	6	4	.600	2	Quarterfinals; Semifinals; Finals	3rd overall (9–5); Coney Island 3, Swift 0 Coney Island 4, San Miguel 2
1993	Commissioner's Cup	Purefoods Oodles Flavor Noodles	2nd/8	11	8	3	.727	1	Semifinals; Finals berth playoff Finals	Tied 2nd overall (11–8) 3–5 in semifinals Purefoods 119, San Miguel 101*; Swift 4, Coney Island 2
1993	Governors' Cup	Purefoods Tender Juicy Hotdogs	3rd/8	10	7	3	.700	1	Semifinals	5th overall (9–9), 2–6 in semifinals
1994	All-Filipino Cup	Coney Island Ice Cream Stars	2nd/8	10	7	3	.700	1	Semifinals; Finals berth playoff Finals	Tied 1st overall (12–6), 5–3 in semifinals Coney Island 86, Swift 74*; San Miguel 4, Coney Island 2
1994	Commissioner's Cup	Purefoods Tender Juicy Hotdogs	2nd/8	11	7	4	.636	2	Semifinals; Finals	2nd overall (13–6), 6–2 in semifinals Purefoods 4, Alaska 1
1994	Governors' Cup	Purefoods Tender Juicy Hotdogs	Bye to the semifinals						Semifinals; 3rd-place playoff	4th overall (4–6); Pepsi 3, Purefoods 1
1995	All-Filipino Cup	Purefoods Tender Juicy Hotdogs	5th/8	10	5	5	.500	2	Semifinals; Finals berth playoff	Tied 2nd overall (10–8), 5–3 in semifinals Alaska 115, Purefoods 89*
1995	Commissioner's Cup	Purefoods Tender Juicy Hotdogs	4th/8	10	6	4	.600	3	Quarterfinals; Semifinals; 3rd-place playoff	4th overall (9–6), 3–2 in quarterfinals Sunkist 3, Purefoods 2 Sta. Lucia 2, Purefoods 0
1995	Governors' Cup	Purefoods Tender Juicy Hotdogs	2nd/8	10	7	3	.700	1	Semifinals	5th overall (9–9), 2–6 in semifinals
1996	All-Filipino Cup	Purefoods Tender Juicy Hotdogs	3rd	14	8	6	.521	2	Semifinals; Finals	1st overall (14–8), 6–2 in semifinals Alaska 4, Purefoods 1
1996	Commissioner's Cup	Purefoods Tender Juicy Hotdogs	5th/8	10	5	5	.500	3	Elimination playoff Semifinals	Purefoods 89, Sunkist 76*; 5th overall (6–12), 1–7 in semifinals
1996	Governors' Cup	Purefoods Corned Beef Cowboys	6th/8	11	5	6	.455	3	Elimination playoff Quarterfinals	Purefoods 81, Sta. Lucia 76; San Miguel** 89, Purefoods 86 (1st game: 91–97)
1997	All-Filipino Cup	Purefoods Corned Beef Cowboys	2nd/8	14	8	6	.571	2	Semifinals; Finals	Tied 1st overall (14–8), 6–2 in semifinals Purefoods 4, Gordon's 2
1997	Commissioner's Cup	Purefoods Corned Beef Cowboys	8th/8	10	3	7	.300	3	Did not qualify	
1997	Governors' Cup	Purefoods Carne Norte Beefies	4th/8	14	8	6	.571	1	Quarterfinals; Semifinals; Finals	Purefoods** def. Mobiline; Purefoods 3, San Miguel 2 Alaska 4, Purefoods 1
1998	All-Filipino Cup	Purefoods Carne Norte Beefies	5th/8	11	5	6	.455	4	Semifinals	5th overall (8–13), 3–7 in semifinals
1998	Commissioner's Cup	Purefoods Tender Juicy Hotdogs	4th/8	11	5	6	.455	5	Quarterfinals	Shell** def. Purefoods
1998	Centennial Cup	Purefoods Tender Juicy Hotdogs	5th/9	8	5	3	.625	1	Did not qualify	
1998	Governors' Cup	Purefoods Tender Juicy Hotdogs	4th/8	(7); 15	(4); 9	(3); 6	(.571).600	--	Semifinals; Finals berth playoff	Tied 1st overall (12–9); Mobiline 84, Purefoods 80
1999	All-Filipino Cup	Purefoods Tender Juicy Hotdogs	6th/9	16	7	9	.438	4	Quarterfinals	Alaska** def. Purefoods
1999	Commissioner's Cup	Purefoods Tender Juicy Hotdogs	7th/9	8	3	5	.375	3	Quarterfinals	Shell** def. Purefoods
1999	Governors' Cup	Purefoods Tender Juicy Hotdogs	1st/9	8	7	1	.875	–	Quarterfinals; Semifinals	Purefoods** 80, Barangay Ginebra 74; Alaska 3, Purefoods 0
2000	All-Filipino Cup	Purefoods Tender Juicy Hotdogs	4th/10	14	8	6	.571	4	Quarterfinals; Semifinals; Finals	Purefoods** 89, Sta. Lucia 79; Purefoods 3, Tanduay 1 Alaska 4, Purefoods 1
2000	Commissioner's Cup	Purefoods Tender Juicy Hotdogs	5th/10	9	4	5	.444	3	Quarterfinals	Alaska** 85, Purefoods 82
2000	Governors' Cup	Purefoods Tender Juicy Hotdogs	4th/10	9	5	4	.556	2	Quarterfinals; Semifinals; Finals	Purefoods** 88, Alaska 69 (1st game: 80–91); Purefoods 3, Mobiline 1 San Miguel 4, Purefoods 1
2001	All-Filipino Cup	Purefoods Tender Juicy Hotdogs	4th/10	14	8	6	.521	1	Quarterfinals	Barangay Ginebra 70, Purefoods** 69 (1st game: 77–76)
2001	Commissioner's Cup	Purefoods Tender Juicy Hotdogs	2nd/10	9	6	3	.667	1	Quarterfinals; Semifinals; 3rd-place playoff	Purefoods** 82, Tanduay 74; Red Bull 3, Purefoods 2 Alaska 1, Purefoods 0*
2001	Governors' Cup	Purefoods Tender Juicy Hotdogs	10th/10	13	5	8	.385	3	Did not qualify	
2002	Governors' Cup	Purefoods Tender Juicy Hotdogs	3rd/12	11	8	3	.727	1	Quarterfinals; Semifinals; Finals	Purefoods** 82, Red Bull 77; Purefoods 3, Coca-Cola 2 Purefoods 4, Alaska 3
2002	Commissioner's Cup	Purefoods Tender Juicy Hotdogs	10th/11	10	3	7	.300	4	Did not qualify	
2002	All-Filipino Cup	Purefoods Tender Juicy Hotdogs	8th/10	9	3	6	.333	5	Did not qualify	
2003	All-Filipino Cup	Purefoods Tender Juicy Hotdogs	5th/Grp A	18	5	13	.277	7	Did not qualify	
2003	Invitational Cup	Purefoods Tender Juicy Hotdogs	4th/4	4	0	4	.000	4	Did not qualify	
2003	Reinforced Conference	Purefoods Tender Juicy Hotdogs	5th/Grp B	13	4	9	.308	4	Elimination playoff	Alaska 93, Purefoods 88*
Elimination round				508	264	244	.520	—	31 semi-final appearances	
Playoffs				356	164	192	.461	—	17 Finals appearances	
Cumulative totals				864	428	436	.495	—	6 championships	

=== Two-conference era (2004–2010) ===
Season	Conference	Team name	Elimination/classification round						Playoffs	
Season	Conference	Team name	Finish	GP	W	L	PCT	GB	Stage	Results
(2004)	Fiesta Conference	Purefoods Tender Juicy Hotdogs	10th/10	18	4	14	.222	12	Wildcard phase	Coca-Cola 94, Purefoods 92*
2004–05	Philippine Cup	Purefoods Tender Juicy Hotdogs	6th/10	18	9	9	.500	4	Wildcard phase Quarterfinals	Purefoods 2, Coca-Cola 1 Shell 2, Purefoods 1
2004–05	Fiesta Conference	Purefoods Tender Juicy Hotdogs	8th/10	18	7	11	.389	5	Wildcard phase Quarterfinals	Purefoods 2, FedEx 1 Shell 2, Purefoods 0
2005–06	Fiesta Conference	Purefoods Chunkee Giants	1st/9	16	10	6	.625	–	Semifinals; Finals	Purefoods 4, Air21 2 Red Bull 4, Purefoods 2
2005–06	Philippine Cup	Purefoods Chunkee Giants	1st/9	16	12	4	.750	–	Semifinals; Finals	Purefoods 4, Alaska 3 Purefoods 4, Red Bull 2
2006–07	Philippine Cup	Purefoods Chunkee Giants	5th/10	18	10	8	.556	3	5th-seed playoff Quarterfinals	Purefoods 92, Sta. Lucia 78*; Talk 'N Text 3, Purefoods 1
2006–07	Fiesta Conference	Purefoods Tender Juicy Giants	8th/10	18	6	12	.333	7	1st wildcard round	Coca-Cola 100, Purefoods 97*
2007–08	Philippine Cup	Purefoods Tender Juicy Giants	1st/10	18	12	6	.667	–	Semifinals; Finals	Purefoods 4, Red Bull 3 Sta. Lucia 4, Purefoods 3
2007–08	Fiesta Conference	Purefoods Tender Juicy Giants	8th/10	18	8	10	.444	4	1st wildcard round	Talk 'N Text 98, Purefoods 83*
2008–09	Philippine Cup	Purefoods Tender Juicy Giants	7th/10	18	8	10	.444	4	1st wildcard round	Air21 94, Purefoods 82*
2008–09	Fiesta Conference	Purefoods Tender Juicy Giants	6th/10	14	7	7	.500	4	Wildcard phase Quarterfinals	Purefoods 126, Talk 'N Text 123 (2OT)*; Rain or Shine 2, Purefoods 1
2009–10	Philippine Cup	Purefoods Tender Juicy Giants	3rd/10	18	12	6	.667	1	Quarterfinals; Semifinals; Finals	Purefoods 3, Rain or Shine 2 Purefoods 4, San Miguel 2 Purefoods 4, Alaska 0
2009–10	Fiesta Conference	B-Meg Derby Ace Llamados	3rd/10	18	13	5	.722	1	2nd-seed playoff Quarterfinals; Semifinals; 3rd-place playoff	San Miguel 88, B-Meg Derby Ace 83*; B-Meg Derby Ace 3, Rain or Shine 2 San Miguel 4, B-Meg Derby Ace 2 Talk 'N Text 113, B-Meg Derby Ace 95*
Elimination/classification round				226	118	108	.522	—	8 post-wildcard appearances	
Playoffs				91	46	45	.505	—	4 Finals appearances	
Cumulative totals				317	164	153	.517	—	2 championships	

*one-game playoffs

=== Three-conference era (2010–present) ===
Season	Conference	Team name	Elimination round						Playoffs	
Season	Conference	Team name	Finish	GP	W	L	PCT	GB	Stage	Results
2010–11	Philippine	B-Meg Derby Ace Llamados	4th/10	14	7	7	.500	1	Quarterfinals; Semifinals	B-MEG Derby Ace 2, Meralco 0 Talk 'N Text 4, B-MEG Derby Ace 2
2010–11	Commissioner's	B-Meg Derby Ace Llamados	7th/10	9	4	5	.444	4	Did not qualify	
2010–11	Governors	B-Meg Derby Ace Llamados	6th/9	8	4	4	.500	2	Semifinals	6th overall (5–8), 1–4 in semifinals
2011–12	Philippine	B-Meg Llamados	1st/10	14	10	4	.714	–	Quarterfinals	Powerade def. B-MEG** in 2 games
2011–12	Commissioner's	B-Meg Llamados	3rd/10	9	6	3	.667	1	2nd-seed playoff Quarterfinals; Semifinals; Finals	Barangay Ginebra 93, B-MEG 84*; B-MEG 2, Meralco 1 B-MEG 3, Barangay Ginebra 1 B-MEG 4, Talk 'N Text 3
2011–12	Governors	B-Meg Llamados	2nd/10	9	6	3	.667	2	Semifinals; Finals berth playoff Finals	T-2nd overall (9–5), 3–2 in semifinals B-MEG 74, Barangay Ginebra 72*; Rain or Shine 4, B-MEG 3
2012–13	Philippine	San Mig Coffee Mixers	2nd/10	14	10	4	.714	2	Quarterfinals; Semifinals	San Mig Coffee** 92, Petron 87; Rain or Shine 4, San Mig Coffee 2
2012–13	Commissioner's	San Mig Coffee Mixers	4th/10	14	8	6	.571	1	Quarterfinals; Semifinals	San Mig Coffee 2, Meralco 1 Alaska 3, San Mig Coffee 1
2012–13	Governors	San Mig Coffee Mixers	2nd/10	9	6	3	.667	2	Quarterfinals; Semifinals; Finals	San Mig Coffee** def. Alaska in 2 games San Mig Coffee 3, Meralco 1 San Mig Coffee 4, Petron 3
2013–14	Philippine	San Mig Super Coffee Mixers	5th/10	14	7	7	.500	4	Quarterfinals; Semifinals; Finals	San Mig Super Coffee 2, Talk 'N Text 1 San Mig Super Coffee 4, Barangay Ginebra 3 San Mig Super Coffee 4, Rain or Shine 2
2013–14	Commissioner's	San Mig Super Coffee Mixers	6th/10	9	4	5	.444	5	Quarterfinals; Semifinals; Finals	San Mig Super Coffee 2, Alaska 1 San Mig Super Coffee 3, Air21 2 San Mig Super Coffee 3, Talk 'N Text 1
2013–14	Governors	San Mig Super Coffee Mixers	4th/10	9	5	4	.556	2	Quarterfinals; Semifinals; Finals	San Mig Super Coffee** 97, San Miguel 90; San Mig Super Coffee 3, Talk 'N Text 2 San Mig Super Coffee 3, Rain or Shine 2
2014–15	Philippine	Purefoods Star Hotshots	7th/12	11	6	5	.545	3	Quarterfinals 1st phase	Meralco** 77, Purefoods 65
2014–15	Commissioner's	Purefoods Star Hotshots	3rd/12	11	8	3	.727	–	Quarterfinals; Semifinals	Purefoods 2, Alaska 0 Talk 'N Text 3, Purefoods 1
2014–15	Governors	Star Hotshots	5th/12	11	6	5	.545	2	Quarterfinals; Semifinals	Star def. GlobalPort** in 2 games Alaska 3, Star 0
2015–16	Philippine	Star Hotshots	9th/12	11	4	7	.364	5	Quarterfinals 1st phase	Barangay Ginebra** 92, Star 89
2015–16	Commissioner's	Star Hotshots	8th/12	11	5	6	.455	3	Quarterfinals	San Miguel** def. Star in 2 games
2015–16	Governors	Star Hotshots	11th/12	11	2	9	.182	8	Did not qualify	
2016–17	Philippine	Star Hotshots	3rd/12	11	7	4	.636	3	Quarterfinals; Semifinals	Star 2, Phoenix 0 Barangay Ginebra 4, Star 3
2016–17	Commissioner's	Star Hotshots	3rd/12	11	9	2	.818	–	Quarterfinals; Semifinals	Star 2, Rain or Shine 0 San Miguel 3, Star 1
2016–17	Governors	Star Hotshots	4th/12	11	7	4	.636	2	Quarterfinals; Semifinals	Star** 89, NLEX 77; Meralco 3, Star 0
2017–18	Philippine	Magnolia Hotshots Pambansang Manok	2nd/12	11	8	3	.727	–	Quarterfinals; Semifinals; Finals	Magnolia** 86, GlobalPort 79; Magnolia 4, NLEX 2 San Miguel 4, Magnolia 1
2017–18	Commissioner's	Magnolia Hotshots Pambansang Manok	7th/12	11	6	5	.545	3	Quarterfinals	Alaska** 89, Magnolia 78
2017–18	Governors	Magnolia Hotshots Pambansang Manok	4th/12	11	8	3	.727	1	Quarterfinals; Semifinals; Finals	Magnolia** 103, Blackwater 99; Magnolia 3, Barangay Ginebra 1, Magnolia 4, Alaska 2
2019	Philippine	Magnolia Hotshots Pambansang Manok	6th/12	11	6	5	.545	3	Quarterfinals; Semifinals; Finals	Magnolia 2, Barangay Ginebra 1 Magnolia 4, Rain or Shine 3 San Miguel 4, Magnolia 3
2019	Commissioner's	Magnolia Hotshots Pambansang Manok	5th/12	11	5	6	.455	5	Quarterfinals	Barangay Ginebra 2, Magnolia 0
2019	Governors	Magnolia Hotshots Pambansang Manok	6th/12	11	6	5	.545	2	Quarterfinals	TNT** 98, Magnolia 97
2020	Philippine	Magnolia Hotshots Pambansang Manok	7th/12	11	7	4	.636	1	Quarterfinals	Phoenix Super LPG** 89, Magnolia 88
2021	Philippine	Magnolia Pambansang Manok Hotshots	3rd/12	11	8	3	.727	2	Quarterfinals; Semifinals; Finals	Magnolia 2, Rain or Shine 0 Magnolia 4, Meralco 2 TNT 4, Magnolia 1
2021	Governors	Magnolia Pambansang Manok Hotshots	1st/12	11	9	2	.818	–	Quarterfinals; Semifinals	Magnolia** 127, Phoenix Super LPG 88; Meralco 3, Magnolia 2
2022–23	Philippine	Magnolia Chicken Timplados Hotshots	3rd/12	11	8	3	.727	1	Quarterfinals; Semifinals	Magnolia 2, NLEX 1 TNT 4, Magnolia 2
2022–23	Commissioner's	Magnolia Chicken Timplados Hotshots	2nd/13	12	10	2	.833	–	Quarterfinals; Semifinals	Magnolia** 102, Phoenix Super LPG 95; Barangay Ginebra 3, Magnolia 1
2022–23	Governors	Magnolia Chicken Timplados Hotshots	5th/12	11	7	4	.636	3	Quarterfinals	Meralco** 113, Magnolia 107
2023–24	Commissioner's	Magnolia Chicken Timplados Hotshots	1st/12	11	9	2	.818	–	Quarterfinals; Semifinals; Finals	Magnolia** 109, TNT 94; Magnolia 3, Phoenix Super LPG 1 San Miguel 4, Magnolia 2
2023–24	Philippine	Magnolia Chicken Timplados Hotshots	7th/12	11	6	5	.545	4	Quarterfinals	Barangay Ginebra** 99, Magnolia 77
2024–25	Governors	Magnolia Chicken Timplados Hotshots	4th in Group A	10	5	5	.500	3	Quarterfinals	Rain or Shine 3, Magnolia 2
2024–25	Commissioner's	Magnolia Chicken Timplados Hotshots	8th/13	12	6	6	.500	3	8th-seed playoff Quarterfinals	Magnolia 112, NLEX 81*; NorthPort** 113, Magnolia 110
2024–25	Philippine	Magnolia Chicken Timplados Hotshots	3rd/12	11	8	3	.727	—	Quarterfinals	TNT def. Magnolia** in 2 games
Elimination round				419	253	166	.604	—	23 Semifinals appearances	
Playoffs				243	123	120	.506	—	11 Finals appearances	
Cumulative records				662	376	286	.568	—	6 Championships	

*one-game playoffs
**team had the twice-to-beat advantage

== Records per season ==
PBA season	Team season	GP	W	L	PCT	Best finish
1988	1988	59	30	29	.508	Finals
1989	1989	66	34	32	.515	Finals
1990	1990	59	34	25	.576	Champions
1991	1991	57	27	30	.474	Champions
1992	1992	58	28	30	.483	Finals
1993	1993	67	39	28	.582	Champions
1994	1994	63	37	26	.587	Champions
1995	1995	61	30	31	.492	Semifinals
1996	1996	60	29	31	.483	Finals
1997	1997	63	34	29	.540	Champions
1998	1998	59	27	32	.458	Semifinals
1999	1999	41	20	21	.488	Semifinals
2000	2000	55	27	28	.491	Finals
2001	2001	45	22	23	.489	Semifinals
2002	2002	43	22	21	.512	Champions
2003	2003	36	9	27	.250	Eliminations
2004 Fiesta	2004–05	17	4	13	.235	Wildcard phase
2004–05	2004–05	47	21	26	.447	Quarterfinals
2005–06	2005–06	57	36	21	.632	Champions
2006–07	2006–07	42	18	24	.429	Quarterfinals
2007–08	2007–08	51	27	24	.529	Finals
2008–09	2008–09	37	17	20	.459	Quarterfinals
2009–10	2009–10	63	41	23	.641	Champions
2010–11	2010–11	44	20	24	.455	Semifinals
2011–12	2011–12	62	38	24	.613	Champions
2012–13	2012–13	64	38	26	.594	Champions
2013–14	2013–14	71	41	30	.577	Champions
2014–15	2014–15	45	25	20	.556	Semifinals
2015–16	2015–16	36	12	24	.333	Quarterfinals
2016–17	2016–17	52	32	20	.615	Semifinals
2017–18	2017–18	57	36	21	.632	Champions
2019	2019	53	26	27	.491	Finals
2020	2020	12	7	5	.583	Quarterfinals
2021	2021	41	27	14	.659	Finals
2022–23	2022–23	49	31	18	.633	Semifinals
2023–24	2023–24	34	21	13	.618	Finals
2024–25	2024–25	42	22	20	.524	Quarterfinals

== Cumulative records ==
Era	GP	W	L	PCT
Three-conference era (1988–2003)	864	428	436	.495
Two-conference era (2004–2010)	317	164	153	.517
Three-conference era (2010–present)	662	376	286	.568
Total	1,843	968	875	.525
