= List of Sta. Lucia Realtors seasons =

Legend
Champion

Runner-up

Semifinalist

This is a list of seasons by the Sta. Lucia Realtors of the Philippine Basketball Association.

== Three-conference era ==
Season	Conference	Team name	Overall record			Finals
Season	Conference	Team name	W	L	%	Finals
1993	All-Filipino Cup	Sta. Lucia Realtors	23	32	.418	
1993	Commissioner's Cup	Sta. Lucia Realtors	23	32	.418	
1993	Governors Cup	Sta. Lucia Realtors	23	32	.418	
1994	All-Filipino Cup	Sta. Lucia Realtors	11	28	.282	
1994	Commissioner's Cup	Sta. Lucia Realtors	11	28	.282	
1994	Governors Cup	Sta. Lucia Realtors	11	28	.282	
1995	All-Filipino Cup	Sta. Lucia Realtors	27	23	.540	
1995	Commissioner's Cup	Sta. Lucia Realtors	27	23	.540	
1995	Governors Cup	Sta. Lucia Realtors	27	23	.540	
1996	All-Filipino Cup	Sta. Lucia Realtors	20	25	.444	
1996	Commissioner's Cup	Sta. Lucia Realtors	20	25	.444	
1996	Governors Cup	Sta. Lucia Realtors	20	25	.444	
1997	All-Filipino Cup	Sta. Lucia Realtors	31	30	.508	
1997	Commissioner's Cup	Sta. Lucia Realtors	31	30	.508	
1997	Governors Cup	Sta. Lucia Realtors	31	30	.508	
1998	All-Filipino Cup	Sta. Lucia Realtors	22	27	.449	
1998	Commissioner's Cup	Sta. Lucia Realtors	22	27	.449	
1998	Centennial Cup	Sta. Lucia Realtors	22	27	.449	
1998	Governors Cup	Sta. Lucia Realtors	22	27	.449	
1999	All-Filipino Cup	Sta. Lucia Realtors	17	24	.415	
1999	Commissioner's Cup	Sta. Lucia Realtors	17	24	.415	
1999	Governors Cup	Sta. Lucia Realtors	17	24	.415	
2000	All-Filipino Cup	Sta. Lucia Realtors	7	9	.438	
2000	Commissioner's Cup	Sta. Lucia Realtors	11	8	.579	San Miguel 4, Sta. Lucia 1
2000	Governors Cup	Sta. Lucia Realtors	4	6	.400	
2001	All-Filipino Cup	Sta. Lucia Realtors	4	10	.286	
2001	Commissioner's Cup	Sta. Lucia Realtors	5	5	.500	
2001	Governors Cup	Sta. Lucia Realtors	16	9	.640	Sta. Lucia 4, San Miguel 2
2002	Governors Cup	Sta. Lucia Realtors	5	7	.417	
2002	Commissioner's Cup	Sta. Lucia Realtors	7	5	.583	
2002	All-Filipino Cup	Sta. Lucia Realtors	5	6	.455	
2003	All-Filipino Cup	Sta. Lucia Realtors	11	15	.423	
2003	Invitational Conference	Sta. Lucia Realtors	2	2	.500	
2003	Reinforced Conference	Sta. Lucia Realtors	10	10	.500	
Overall record			238	281	.459	1 championship

== Two-conference era ==
Season	Conference	Team name	Elimination/classification round						Playoffs	
Season	Conference	Team name	Finish	GP	W	L	PCT	GB	Stage	Results
(2004)	Fiesta Conference	Sta. Lucia Realtors	6th/10	18	8	10	.444	8	Wildcard phase	Barangay Ginebra 108, Sta. Lucia 105*
2004-05	Philippine Cup	Sta. Lucia Realtors	8th/10	18	6	12	.333	6	Did not qualify	
2004-05	Fiesta Conference	Sta. Lucia Realtors	4th/10	18	10	8	.556	2	Wildcard phase	Shell 84, Sta. Lucia** 75; Shell 95, Sta. Lucia** 85
2005-06	Fiesta Conference	Sta. Lucia Realtors	6th/9	16	7	9	.438	3	Wildcard phase	Alaska 2, Sta. Lucia 0
2005-06	Philippine Cup	Sta. Lucia Realtors	9th/9	16	4	12	.250	8	Wildcard phase	4th overall (5–14), 3rd in wildcards (1–2)
2006-07	Philippine Cup	Sta. Lucia Realtors	6th/10	18	10	8	.556	3	5th-seed playoff Wildcard phase Wildcard final Quarterfinals	Purefoods 92, Sta. Lucia 78*; 1st overall (11–10) 2nd in wildcards (2–1); Sta. Lucia 121, Air21 118 (OT)*; Red Bull 3, Sta. Lucia 1
2006-07	Fiesta Conference	Sta. Lucia Realtors	9th/10	18	5	13	.278	8	1st wildcard round	San Miguel 102, Sta. Lucia 85*
2007-08	Philippine Cup	Sta. Lucia Realtors	2nd/10	18	12	6	.667	--	Semifinals; Finals	Sta. Lucia 4, Alaska 3 Sta. Lucia 4, Purefoods 3
2007-08	Fiesta Conference	Sta. Lucia Realtors	9th/10	18	7	11	.389	5	1st wildcard round 2nd wildcard round Quarterfinals	Sta. Lucia 99, Alaska 86*; Sta. Lucia 111, Talk 'N Text 96*; Barangay Ginebra 2, Sta. Lucia 0
2008-09	Philippine Cup	Sta. Lucia Realtors	5th/10	18	10	8	.556	2	Quarterfinals; Semifinals; 3rd-place playoff	Sta. Lucia 2, Rain or Shine 0 Alaska 4, Sta. Lucia 2 Sta. Lucia 99, San Miguel 97 (OT)*
2008-09	Fiesta Conference	Sta. Lucia Realtors	5th/10	14	7	7	.500	4	Wildcard phase Quarterfinals	Sta. Lucia 94, Coca-Cola 88*; Burger King 2, Sta. Lucia 1
2009-10 (details)	Philippine Cup	Sta. Lucia Realtors	6th/10	18	10	8	.556	3	1st wildcard round	Rain or Shine 90, Sta. Lucia 86*
2009-10 (details)	Fiesta Conference	Sta. Lucia Realtors	8th/10	18	5	13	.278	10	1st wildcard round	Coca-Cola 100, Sta. Lucia 84*
Elimination/classification round				226	101	125	.447	—	4 post-wildcard appearances	
Playoffs				52	21	31	.404	—	1 Finals appearance	
Cumulative records				278	122	156	.439	—	1 championship	

*one-game playoffs
**Team had twice-to-beat advantage

== Cumulative records ==
Era	GP	W	L	PCT
Three-conference era (1975–2003)	519	238	281	.459
Two-conference era (2004–2010)	278	122	156	.439
Total	797	360	437	.452
