= Eric Altamirano =

Filipino basketball player and coach

UP Fighting Maroons
- Title: Head coach
- League: UAAP

Personal information
- Born: August 8, 1966 (age 60) Davao City, Philippines
- Listed height: 5 ft 11 in (1.80 m)
- Listed weight: 160 lb (73 kg)

Career information
- High school: San Beda (Manila)
- College: UP
- PBA draft: 1988: 1st round
- Drafted by: Alaska Air Force
- Playing career: 1989–1994
- Position: Point guard
- Number: 11; 4
- Coaching career: 1995–2020, 2026–present

Career history

Playing
- 1989–1990: Alaska
- 1991: Pepsi
- 1992–1994: Shell

Coaching
- 1995–1996: Purefoods Corned Beef Cowboys (assistant)
- 1996–1997: UP (men)
- 1997–1998: Purefoods Corned Beef Cowboys
- 1998–2000: Mobiline Phone Pals
- 2001–2003: Purefoods Tender Juicy Hotdogs
- 2005: Coca-Cola Tigers
- 2006–2007: San Miguel Beermen (assistant)
- 2009: Philippines U16
- 2010: Philippines U18
- 2011–2016: NU
- 2016–2019: Alaska Aces (assistant)
- 2019–2020: Chooks-to-Go 3x3 (pro circuit teams)
- 2026–present: UP (women)

Career highlights
- As head coach: PBA champion (1997 All-Filipino); UAAP champion (2014); As player: UAAP champion (1986); UAAP Most Valuable Player (1986); UAAP Rookie of the Year (1983)
Medals
Men's basketball
Representing Philippines
Asian Games
Bronze medal – third place	1986 Seoul	Team

Frederick "Eric" Altamirano (born August 8, 1966) is a Filipino former professional basketball player and current head coach of the UP Fighting Maroons women's basketball team of the UAAP. He was the commissioner of Chooks-to-Go Pilipinas 3x3 and PBA 3x3. He was part of the Philippine national team that played at the 1986 Asian Games.

== Playing career ==
=== Varsity ===
Eric Altamirano was born in Davao City, Philippines, and went to San Beda College for his high school education. He was a member of the Red Cubs, the school's varsity basketball team and was one of the players who were instrumental in giving the school a string of championships.

=== College / Amateur ===
He played college ball for the University of the Philippines in the University Athletic Association of the Philippines, Eric gained prominence in College when in 1986, together with Ronnie Magsanoc and Benjie Paras, they led the UP Maroons to its first UAAP crown after 47 years and the team's first post-war title since the NCAA days. He was named the Most Valuable Player that same year.

Altamirano was a member of the Philippine national team that took home the bronze medal at the 1986 Asian Games in Seoul, the nationals were mentored by his UP coach Joe Lipa. He played for YCO Shine Masters in the PABL.

=== Professional ===
Altamirano was signed as a rookie free agent by Alaska in 1989. He wasn't really able to prove his worth in the pros, playing back-up to the starting point guard of his team. He also played for Pepsi and Shell.

He is now the program director for the National Basketball Training Center, a grassroots program for Philippine Basketball. In 2004, he also created the Coach E Basketball School.

== Coaching career ==
=== Collegiate coach ===
Altamirano ventured into coaching after retiring from playing. His first try was in 1996 when he led the University of the Philippines (UP) Fighting Maroons to a Final Four finish. He was the head coach of the National University Bulldogs from 2011 to 2016. He steered the Bulldogs when the team won their first UAAP men's basketball championship after 60 years in Season 77 men's basketball finals in 2014.

After an unsatisfactory performance in Season 79, Altamirano and the rest of his coaching staff led by Vic Ycasiano, Joey Guanio, Paolo Layug, and Anton Altamirano filed their resignation. On December 7, the management of the NU Bulldogs accepted the resignation letter of Altamirano.

Altamirano returned to UP in March 2026 as head coach of the women's team.

=== Pro League coach ===
Altamirano won two championships in the PBA. Before leading Purefoods to a PBA title in 1997, he was Chot Reyes' assistant coach at Purefoods in 1995 until 1996. After leading the Cowboys in the All-Filipino Conference, he moved to the Mobiline Phone Pals and gave them a championship, the 1998 PBA Centennial Cup. But after the 2000 PBA All-Filipino Cup, he was fired together with the whole coaching staff, and replaced by his former assistant Louie Alas.

He returned to Purefoods and gave them a string of decent finishes. He left Purefoods, after being selected by Jong Uichico as the RP men's basketball team assistant coach. After 2 years of not coaching a PBA team, he coached the Coca-Cola Tigers during the 2005 PBA Fiesta Conference. Eventually, he was reassigned and appointed as the Project Director for the San Miguel All Stars.

=== 3x3 team coach ===
Altamirano would oversee the Chooks-to-Go 3x3 teams which competed at the FIBA 3x3 Men's Pro Circuit for two years. He resigned from his post in November 2020 and was replaced by Aldin Ayo.

=== National team coach ===
He was the head coach of the Nokia Pilipinas Under 18 Men's basketball team. Handled of the Nokia Pilipinas Men's National under-16 national basketball team of the Philippines, that placed 4th in the Fiba Asia U 16 Men's Tournament in Johor Bahru in November 2009., and Project Director of the National Basketball Training Center of the Samahang Basketbol ng Pilipinas, the country's national basketball federation.

== Managerial career ==
He served as general manager of Barangay Ginebra in 2004, replacing Ira Maniquis who served until early 2004, and but only replaced for short time by Allan Caidic on March of the same year.

== Coaching record ==
=== Collegiate record ===
Season	Team	Elimination round					Playoffs				
Season	Team	GP	W	L	PCT	Finish	PG	PW	PL	PCT	Results
1996	UP	14	9	5	.643	3rd	1	0	1	.000	Semifinals
2011	NU	14	6	8	.429	5th	—	—	—	—	Eliminated
2012	NU	14	9	5	.643	3rd	1	0	1	.000	Semifinals
2013	NU	14	10	4	.714	1st	2	0	2	.000	Semifinals
2014	NU	14	9	5	.643	4th	6	5	1	.833	Champions
2015	NU	14	7	7	.500	4th	1	0	1	.000	Semifinals
2016	NU	14	5	9	.357	5th	—	—	—	—	Eliminated
Totals		98	55	43	.561		11	5	6	.454	1 championship

=== PBA ===
Season	Conference	Team	GP	W	L	PCT	Finish	PG	W	L	PCT	Results
1997	All-Filipino Cup	Purefoods	14	8	6	.571	1st	16	12	4	.750	Champions
1997	Commissioner's Cup	Purefoods	10	3	7	.300	8th	—	—	—	—	Eliminated
1997	Governor's Cup	Purefoods	14	8	6	.571	4th	11	5	6	.454	Finals
1998	All-Filipino Cup	Purefoods	11	5	6	.445	5th	10	3	7	.300	Semifinals
1998	Commissioner's Cup	Mobiline	11	5	6	.445	6th	1	0	1	.000	Quarterfinals
1998	Governor's Cup	Mobiline	15	9	6	.600	1st	13	6	7	.461	Finals
1999	All-Filipino Cup	Mobiline	16	11	5	.688	1st	2	0	2	.000	Quarterfinals
1999	Commissioner's Cup	Mobiline	8	3	5	.735	8th	1	0	1	.000	Quarterfinals
1999	Governor's Cup	Mobiline	8	3	5	.735	7th	2	1	1	.000	Quarterfinals
2000	All-Filipino Cup	Mobiline	14	5	9	.357	7th	1	0	1	.000	Quarterfinals
2001	All-Filipino Cup	Purefoods	14	8	6	.571	4th	2	0	2	.000	Quarterfinals
2001	Commissioner's Cup	Purefoods	9	6	3	.667	3rd	6	3	3	.500	Semifinals
2001	Governor's Cup	Purefoods	13	5	8	.358	9th	—	—	—	—	Eliminated
2002	All-Filipino Cup	Purefoods	9	3	6	.333	8th	—	—	—	—	Eliminated
2004–05	Fiesta	Coca-Cola	18	6	12	.333	10th	1	0	1	.000	Wildcard phase
Total			184	88	96	.478	Playoff Total	66	30	36	.455	1 PBA championship

Preceded by Joe Lipa	UP Fighting Maroons men's basketball head coach 1996	Succeeded by Nic Jorge
Preceded by Eric Gonzales	NU Bulldogs men's basketball head coach 2011-2016	Succeeded by Jamike Jarin
