= List of Pop Cola Panthers seasons =

Legend
Champion

Runner-up

Semifinalist

This is a list of seasons by the Pop Cola Panthers of the Philippine Basketball Association.

Season	Conference	Team name	Overall record			Finals
Season	Conference	Team name	W	L	%	Finals
1990	First Conference	Pop Cola Sizzlers	10	28	.263	
1990	All-Filipino Conference	Pop Cola Sizzlers	10	28	.263	
1990	Third Conference	Sarsi Sizzlers	10	28	.263	
1991	First Conference	Diet Sarsi Sizzlers	31	27	.534	
1991	All-Filipino Conference	Diet Sarsi Sizzlers	31	27	.534	Purefoods 3, Diet Sarsi 2
1991	Third Conference	Swift Mighty Meaty Hotdogs	31	27	.534	
1992	First Conference	Swift Mighty Meaty Hotdogs	29	28	.509	
1992	All-Filipino Conference	Swift Mighty Meaty Hotdogs	29	28	.509	
1992	Third Conference	Swift Mighty Meaty Hotdogs	29	28	.509	Swift 4, 7-Up 0
1993	All-Filipino Cup	Swift Mighty Meaty Hotdogs	46	25	.648	
1993	Commissioner's Cup	Swift Mighty Meaty Hotdogs	46	25	.648	Swift 4, Purefoods 2
1993	Governors Cup	Swift Mighty Meaty Hotdogs	46	25	.648	San Miguel 4, Swift 1
1994	All-Filipino Cup	Swift Mighty Meaties	40	33	.548	
1994	Commissioner's Cup	Swift Mighty Meaties	40	33	.548	
1994	Governors Cup	Swift Mighty Meaties	40	33	.548	Alaska 4, Swift 2
1995	All-Filipino Cup	Sunkist Orange Juicers	49	23	.681	Sunkist 4, Alaska 3
1995	Commissioner's Cup	Sunkist Orange Juicers	49	23	.681	Sunkist 4, Alaska 2
1995	Governors Cup	Sunkist Orange Juicers	49	23	.681	
1996	All-Filipino Cup	Sunkist Orange Juicers	16	22	.421	
1996	Commissioner's Cup	Sunkist Orange Bottlers	16	22	.421	
1996	Governors Cup	Sunkist Orange Bottlers	16	22	.421	
1997	All-Filipino Cup	Pop Cola Bottlers	14	24	.368	
1997	Commissioner's Cup	Pop Cola Bottlers	14	24	.368	
1997	Governors Cup	Pop Cola Sizzlers	14	24	.368	
1998	All-Filipino Cup	Pop Cola 800s	27	27	.500	
1998	Commissioner's Cup	Pop Cola 800s	27	27	.500	
1998	Centennial Cup	Pop Cola 800s	27	27	.500	
1998	Governors Cup	Pop Cola 800s	27	27	.500	
1999	All-Filipino Cup	Pop Cola 800s	8	25	.242	
1999	Commissioner's Cup	Pop Cola 800s	8	25	.242	
1999	Governors Cup	Pop Cola 800s	8	25	.242	
2000	All-Filipino Cup	Pop Cola 800s	6	9	.400	
2000	Commissioner's Cup	Sunkist Orange Juicers	4	6	.400	
2000	Governors Cup	Pop Cola Panthers	2	7	.222	
2001	All-Filipino Cup	Pop Cola Panthers	11	10	.524	
2001	Commissioner's Cup	Pop Cola Panthers	3	7	.300	
2001	Governors Cup	Swift Panthers	10	10	.500	
2001	Governors Cup	Pop Cola Panthers	10	10	.500	
Overall record			306	311	.496	4 championships
