= Silas Mills =

American retired basketball player

Personal information
- Born: April 5, 1972 (age 54)
- Listed height: 6 ft 6 in (1.98 m)
- Listed weight: 200 lb (91 kg)

Career information
- High school: Washington HS
- College: Utah (1992–1993); SLCC (1993–1994); Utah State (1994–1996)
- NBA draft: 1996: undrafted
- Playing career: 1996–2010
- Position: Shooting Guard / Small Forward
- Number: 1

Career history
- 1996–1997: Kalev
- 1997: Atlantic City Seagulls
- 1997: New Hampshire Thunder Loons
- 1997–1998: Magic City Snowbears
- 1998: Mobiline Phone Pals
- 1998: Long Island Surf
- 1998: New Hampshire Thunder Loons
- 1998–1999: La Crosse Bobcats
- 1999: Yakima Sun Kings
- 1999: Mobiline Phone Pals
- 1999–2000: Yakima Sun Kings
- 2000–2001: Fenerbahce Istanbul
- 2001: Kansas City Knights
- 2001–2002: Sioux Falls Skyforce
- 2002: Amatori Udine
- 2002: Barangay Ginebra Kings
- 2002: Panionios Athens
- 2002–2003: Gary Steelheads
- 2003: Bnei Hasharon
- 2003: Sioux Falls Skyforce
- 2003–2004: Shaanxi Dongsheng Kylins
- 2004: CB Granada
- 2004–2005: Calpe Aguas de Calpe
- 2005: Azovmash Mariupol
- 2005–2006: Leon Caja Espana
- 2006: Regatas Corrientes
- 2006: Obras Sanitarias
- 2006–2007: JL Bourg
- 2007: Hyères-Toulon Var
- 2007–2008: Saint-Quentin
- 2008–2009: Lechugueros de Leon
- 2009–2010: Indios de Ciudad Juárez
- 2010: Saint-Chamond

Career highlights
- CBA champion (2000); PBA Best Import (1998 Governors')

Silas Mills is an American retired professional basketball player.

== Collegiate career ==
Mills played for multiple teams for college, these are: Utah (1992–1993), Salt Lake Community College (1993–1994), and Utah State (1994–1996). As a senior at USU, he averaged 16.7 points and 7.9 rebounds per game and was named Second Team All-Big West Conference.

== Professional basketball career ==
=== CBA ===
Mills won a Continental Basketball Association (CBA) championship with the Yakima Sun Kings in 2000.

=== Philippines ===
In 1998, Mills played for Mobiline Phone Pals for 1998 Governors' Cup, teaming up with Tee McClary. The two led the team into a special championship in the Centennial Cup. The duo also led the team into 1998 Governors Cup finals, but lost to Formula Shell in seven games. Mills got his best import award.

He returned for the Phone Pals in the 1999 Commissioner's Cup.

He also played for Barangay Ginebra in 2002 Commissioner's Cup, but replaced after four games due to his on and off the court conduct.

=== Europe ===
In Europe, he played for Snaidero Udine in Lega Serie A from 2001 to 2002. In 2002–2003, he played for Panionios of the Greek Basket League. In 2006–2007, he played for = JL Bourg of LNB Pro A, and in 2007–2008 for HTV Basket in the same league of JL Bourg.

== PBA career statistics ==
Legend
GP	Games played	MPG	Minutes per game
FG%	Field-goal percentage	3P%	3-point field-goal percentage	FT%	Free-throw percentage
RPG	Rebounds per game	APG	Assists per game	SPG	Steals per game
BPG	Blocks per game	PPG	Points per game	**Bold**	Career high

=== Season-by-season averages ===
Year	Team	GP	RPG	APG	SPG	BPG	PPG
1998	Mobiline	31	12.8	6.7	1.2	1.4	25.2
1999	Mobiline	9	10.8	5.7	2.0	0.7	28.4
Career		40	12.3	6.5	1.4	1.2	25.9
