= 1998 PBA Governors' Cup finals =

Basketball championship

1998 PBA Governors Cup finals
| Team | Coach | Wins |
|---|---|---|
| Formula Shell Super Unleaded | Perry Ronquillo | 4 |
| Mobiline Phone Pals | Eric Altamirano | 3 |
- Dates: November 24 – December 9, 1998
- MVP: Benjie Paras
- Television: VTV (IBC)
- Radio network: DWFM

PBA Governors Cup finals chronology
- < 1997 1999 >

PBA finals chronology
- < 1998 Centennial 1999 All-Filipino >

The 1998 PBA Governors Cup finals was the best-of-7 basketball championship series of the 1998 PBA Governors Cup, and the conclusion of the conference playoffs. The Formula Shell Super Unleaded and Mobiline Phone Pals played for the 71st championship contested by the league and a rematch of their one-game finale in the 1998 PBA Centennial Cup.

Formula Shell wins their third PBA title and their first in six years, with a 4–3 series victory over the Mobiline Phone Pals.

Benjie Paras won his first PBA Finals MVP in Governors' Cup Finals.

== Qualification ==
| Shell | | Mobiline |
|---|---|---|
| Finished 9–6 (.600) | Eliminations | Finished 9–6 (.600) |
| Finished 12–9 (.571) | Semifinals | Finished 12–9 (.571) |
| Won against San Miguel, 87–83 | Playoff | Won against Purefoods, 84–80 |

== Series scoring summary ==
| Team | Game 1 | Game 2 | Game 3 | Game 4 | Game 5 | Game 6 | Game 7 | Wins |
|---|---|---|---|---|---|---|---|---|
| Formula Shell | 110 | 67 | 78 | 109 | 81 | 80 | 93 | 4 |
| Mobiline | 90 | 94 | 81 | 97 | 88 | 77 | 91 | 3 |

== Games summary ==
=== Game 1 ===
VTV

November 24

Formula Shell 110, Mobiline Phone Pals 90
| Pts: John Best 30 | Pts: Artemus McClary 31 |
Shell leads series, 1–0

Cuneta Astrodome, Pasay

=== Game 2 ===
VTV

November 27

Formula Shell 67, Mobiline Phone Pals 94
Series tied, 1–1

Araneta Coliseum, Quezon City

=== Game 3 ===
VTV

November 29

Formula Shell 78, Mobiline Phone Pals 81
| Pts: John Best 25 | Pts: Silas Mills 25 |
Mobiline leads series, 2–1

Araneta Coliseum, Quezon City

Silas Mills and Tee McClary combined for the last four points of the Phone Pals after Shell briefly took the upper hand on John Best' jumper, 78–77.

=== Game 4 ===
VTV

December 1

Formula Shell 109, Mobiline Phone Pals 97
| Pts: Donald Williams 36 John Best 30 |
Series tied, 2–2

Cuneta Astrodome, Pasay

=== Game 5 ===
VTV

December 4

Formula Shell 81, Mobiline Phone Pals 88
Scoring by quarter: 22–18, 14–25, 22–20, 23–25
| Pts: John Best 32 | Pts: Silas Mills 33 |
Mobiline leads series, 3–2

Araneta Coliseum, Quezon City

Glenn Capacio came up with a clutch basket in the final 30 seconds after Shell threatened at 81–82 with 2:01 left on back-to-back triples by Donald Williams. Earlier, five straight free throws by Mills and Tee McClary gave the Mobiline Phone Pals an 82–75 lead.

=== Game 6 ===
VTV

December 6

Formula Shell 80, Mobiline Phone Pals 77
Series tied, 3–3

Cuneta Astrodome, Pasay

=== Game 7 ===
VTV

December 9

Formula Shell 93, Mobiline Phone Pals 91
Scoring by quarter: 22–17, 21–23, 25–30, 25–21
| Pts: John Best 31 | Pts: Silas Mills 29 |
Formula Shell wins series, 4–3

Cuneta Astrodome, Pasay

Benjie Paras fired 12 of his 18 points in the final quarter as he had all the Zoom Masters' output in an 8–3 run which gave Shell the lead, 90–89, time down to 1:33, Gerry Esplana's fadeaway jumper with 27 ticks left put them in front by three, 92–89. Mobiline had a chance to win it all at the buzzer but Patrick Fran missed a potential game-winning three-point shot with a second left after failing to give the ball to Silas Mills. Shell survived a Mobiline' all-time finals record of 14 three-point shots made, John Best led the Zoom Masters with 31 points, Silas Mills went 6-of-8 from the three-point area to finish with 29 points for the Phone Pals. Benjie Paras on his first Finals MVP and Formula Shell captures on his championship third title.

1998 PBA Governors Cup Champions

Formula Shell Super Unleaded
Third title

== Rosters ==
Formula Shell roster
Players
Coaches

| Pos. | No. | Nat. | Name | Ht. | Wt. | Age |
|---|---|---|---|---|---|---|---|
| F | 3 | (United States) | Chris Jackson | 6 ft 4 in (1.93 m) | | | San Bernardino Valley |
| G | 4 | (United States) | Noy Castillo | 6 ft 0 in (1.83 m) | | | The Citadel |
| F | 8 | (Philippines) | Jojo Lim | 6 ft 3 in (1.91 m) | | | Visayas |
| F | 9 | (Philippines) | Jay Mendoza | 6 ft 4 in (1.93 m) | | | Mapúa |
| G | 10 | (Philippines) | Richie Ticzon | 5 ft 8 in (1.73 m) | | | Ateneo |
| G | 12 | (Philippines) | Porferio Marzan | 6 ft 2 in (1.88 m) | | | Baguio |
| C | 14 | (Philippines) | Benjie Paras | 6 ft 5 in (1.96 m) | | | Philippines |
| F | 19 | (Philippines) | Joel Dualan | 6 ft 3 in (1.91 m) | | | Manila |
| F | 21 | (United States) | Donald Williams (I) | 6 ft 3 in (1.91 m) | | | North Carolina |
| F/C | 25 | (United States) | John Best (I) | 6 ft 5 in (1.96 m) | | | Tennessee Tech |
| G | 30 | (Philippines) | Gerry Esplana | 5 ft 11 in (1.80 m) | | | Far Eastern |
| G | 31 | (Philippines) | Rommel Santos | 5 ft 11 in (1.80 m) | | | Staten Island |
| F/C | 32 | (Philippines) | Jolly Escobar | 6 ft 5 in (1.96 m) | | | UE |
| F | 33 | (Philippines) | Victor Pablo | 6 ft 4 in (1.93 m) | | | Far Eastern |

Head coach

- (Philippines) Perry Ronquillo

Assistant coach(es)

- (Philippines) Joey Guanio

Legend

- (C) Team captain
- (I) Import
- Injured

Mobiline Phone Pals roster
Players
Coaches

| Pos. | No. | Nat. | Name | Ht. | Wt. | Age |
|---|---|---|---|---|---|---|---|
| F | 1 | (United States) | Silas Mills (I) | 6 ft 6 in (1.98 m) | | | Utah State |
| G | 3 | (Philippines) | Antonio Espinosa | 5 ft 7 in (1.70 m) | | | De La Salle |
| G | 8 | (Philippines) | Al Solis | 5 ft 11 in (1.80 m) | | | Visayas |
| G/F | 9 | (Philippines) | Jose Francisco | 6 ft 1 in (1.85 m) | | | Far Eastern |
| F | 10 | (Philippines) | Alvin Teng | 6 ft 4 in (1.93 m) | | | Arellano |
| G/F | 12 | (Philippines) | Glenn Capacio | 6 ft 1 in (1.85 m) | | | Far Eastern |
| F | 14 | (Philippines) | Eric Reyes | 6 ft 4 in (1.93 m) | | | Ateneo |
| G | 17 | (Philippines) | Patrick Fran | 6 ft 0 in (1.83 m) | | | UST |
| G/F | 24 | (Philippines) | Merwin Castelo | 6 ft 2 in (1.88 m) | | | San Beda |
| F | 25 | (United States) | Artemus McClary (I) | 6 ft 4 in (1.93 m) | | | Jacksonville |
| F | 33 | (Philippines) | Joselito Martin | 6 ft 3 in (1.91 m) | | | NCBA |
| F/C | 81 | (Philippines) | Gabby Cui | 6 ft 4 in (1.93 m) | | | Ateneo |

Head coach

- (Philippines) Eric Altamirano

Assistant coach(es)

- (Philippines) Frankie Lim
- (Philippines) Ryan Gregorio

Legend

- (C) Team captain
- (I) Import
- Injured

== Broadcast notes ==
| Game | Play-by-play | Analyst | Courtside Reporters |
|---|---|---|---|
| Game 1 | Ed Picson | Andy Jao | Ina Raymundo, Anthony Suntay and Ria Tanjuatco |
| Game 2 | Noli Eala | Quinito Henson | Ria Tanjuatco |
| Game 3 | Ed Picson | Andy Jao | Ronnie Nathanielsz Jannelle So and Ria Tanjuatco |
| Game 4 | Noli Eala | Quinito Henson | None |
| Game 5 | Ed Picson | Andy Jao | Ria Tanjuatco |
| Game 6 | Mon Liboro | Yeng Guiao | Paolo Trillo and Seppie Cristobal |
| Game 7 | Noli Eala | Yeng Guiao | Randy Sacdalan, Paolo Trillo, Seppie Cristobal and Barry Pascua |
