= 1998 Formula Shell Zoom Masters season =

- Head coach: Chito Narvasa; Perry Ronquillo

All-Filipino Cup results
- Record: 4–7 (36.4%)
- Place: 8th
- Playoff finish: N/A

Commissioner's Cup results
- Record: 9–10 (47.4%)
- Place: 4th
- Playoff finish: (defeated by Pop Cola in third place playoff)

Governors' Cup results
- Record: 17–12 (58.6%)
- Place: 1st
- Playoff finish: Champions (defeated Mobiline 4-3)

Formula Shell Zoom Masters seasons

The 1998 Formula Shell Zoom Masters season was the 14th season of the franchise in the Philippine Basketball Association (PBA).

== Draft picks ==
Round	Pick	Player	Nationality	College
1	1	Danny Ildefonso	Philippines	National
2	10	Joel Dualan	Philippines	Manila
3	17	Randy Alcantara	Philippines	Mapúa
4	23	Melchor Crisostomo	Philippines	Manila

== Notable date ==
February 17: Richie Ticzon attempted a desperation three-pointer and was fouled by Boars forward Noli Locsin. He sank all three free throws to give Shell an 86-85 overtime victory over Gordon's Gin for their first win of the season after losing their first four games in the All-Filipino Cup. Victor Pablo led the Zoom Masters valiant effort with 33 points, 13 in the fourth quarter.

== Occurrences ==
Coach Chito Narvasa has filed a leave of absence with only four games left for the Zoom Masters in the All-Filipino Cup eliminations. Assistant coach Perry Ronquillo was named interim coach and led the team to three victories but failed to advance in the next round.

Shell's former coach Chito Narvasa has moved over to the Purefoods Tender Juicy Hotdogs as their new coach beginning the Commissioner's Cup.

Bobby Parks played two games in the Commissioner's Cup before John Best on his third stint in the PBA takes over as the Zoom Masters' import.

Shell release Estong Ballesteros to the Pangasinan Presidents in the Metropolitan Basketball Association (MBA) during the middle of the year. Shell was fined P50,000 for failing to inform the PBA office.

== Championship ==
John Best teamed up with the streak-shooting Donald Williams for the Centennial Cup and Governors Cup tournament. Shell beat Ginebra in their semifinal playoff, 78-75 in overtime on October 4, to reach the Centennial Cup finals against Mobiline, Williams finish that game with 39 points and hitting eight triples. In a one-game championship on October 6, Shell lost to Mobiline in overtime by a point, 66-67.

In the Governor's Cup, John Best and Donald Williams wouldn't be denied as the Zoom Masters exact revenge on the Mobiline Phone Pals, the two teams played in the finals after they knock off San Miguel Beermen and Purefoods respectively in sudden-death playoffs when all four semifinalist finish with identical 12 wins and 9 losses. Shell won over Mobiline in an exciting seven-game series by coming back from a 2-3 series deficit to win the last two games and clinch their third PBA title and the first in six years.

== Roster ==
1998 Formula Shell Zoom Masters roster
Players

Pos.	#	POB	Name	Height	Weight	DOB (YYYY–MM–DD)	From
F	3	(United States)	Chris Jackson	6 ft 4 in (1.93 m)			San Bernardino Valley
G	4	(United States)	Noy Castillo	6 ft 0 in (1.83 m)			The Citadel
F	8	(Philippines)	Jojo Lim	6 ft 3 in (1.91 m)			Visayas
F	9	(Philippines)	Jay Mendoza	6 ft 4 in (1.93 m)			Mapúa
G	10	(Philippines)	Richie Ticzon	5 ft 8 in (1.73 m)			Ateneo
G	12	(Philippines)	Porferio Marzan	6 ft 2 in (1.88 m)			Baguio
C	14	(Philippines)	Benjie Paras	6 ft 5 in (1.96 m)			Philippines
F	19	(Philippines)	Joel Dualan	6 ft 3 in (1.91 m)			Manila
G	30	(Philippines)	Gerry Esplana	5 ft 11 in (1.80 m)			Far Eastern
G	31	(Philippines)	Rommel Santos	5 ft 11 in (1.80 m)			Staten Island
F/C	32	(Philippines)	Jolly Escobar	6 ft 5 in (1.96 m)			UE
F	33	(Philippines)	Victor Pablo	6 ft 4 in (1.93 m)			Far Eastern

Coaches

Head coach

- (Philippines) Perry Ronquillo

Assistant coach(es)

- (Philippines) Joey Guanio

Legend

- (C) Team captain
- Injured

== Transactions ==
=== Trades ===
Off-season	To San Miguel Beermen Danny Ildefonso	To Formula Shell Noy Castillo

Off-season	To Sta. Lucia Realtors Ronnie Magsanoc; Rights in next year's first round pick	To Formula Shell Gerald Esplana; Chris Jackson

=== Released/subtractions ===
Player	Number	Position	School	Reason left	New Team
Estong Ballesteros	16	F	UST	Leaving for MBA	Pangasinan Presidents

=== Recruited imports ===
Tournament	Name	Number	Position	University/College	Duration
Commissioner's Cup	Bobby Parks	22	Forward	Memphis	May 22–24
Commissioner's Cup	John Best	25	Forward/center	Tennessee Tech	May 29-August 2 August 30-December 9
Commissioner's Cup; Governor's Cup	John Best	25	Forward/center	Tennessee Tech	May 29-August 2 August 30-December 9
Governors' Cup	John Best	25	Forward/center	Tennessee Tech	May 29-August 2 August 30-December 9
Governors' Cup	Donald Williams	21	Forward	North Carolina	August 30-December 9
