= 1998 Mobiline Phone Pals season =

- Head coach: Tommy Manotoc; Eric Altamirano
- General Manager: Debbie Tan
- Owner(s): Pilipino Telephone Corporation

All-Filipino Cup results
- Record: 4–7 (36.4%)
- Place: 7th
- Playoff finish: Eliminated

Commissioner's Cup results
- Record: 5–7 (41.7%)
- Place: 6th
- Playoff finish: Quarterfinals (lost to San Miguel in one game)

Governors' Cup results
- Record: 16–13 (55.2%)
- Place: 2nd
- Playoff finish: Runner-up (lost to Formula Shell 3-4)

Mobiline Phone Pals seasons

The 1998 Mobiline Phone Pals season was the 9th season of the franchise in the Philippine Basketball Association (PBA).

== Draft picks ==
Round	Pick	Player	Nationality	College
2	11	Braulio Lim	Philippines	UE
3		Tyrone Bautista	Philippines	La Salle

== Occurrences ==
Mobiline coach Tommy Manotoc has hired three-time MVP William Adornado as one of his assistant coaches at the start of the season.

Beginning the Commissioner's Cup on May 22, former Purefoods coach Eric Altamirano signed a four-year contract to coach the Mobiline Phone Pals. Altamirano's contract with Purefoods expired last March 31.

== Notable dates ==
February 8: Andy Seigle nailed a baseline jumper in the final 25 seconds and made a crucial steal afterwards as Mobiline redeemed itself from their first game blowout loss to Gordon's Gin by nipping defending champion Purefoods Carne Norte Beefies, 67-64.

March 8: Al Solis shot seven triples, one short of his own personal record to finish with a game-high 27 points as Mobiline keeps its hopes alive for a semifinals berth in the All-Filipino Cup with an 89-77 win over San Miguel Beermen and give the Phone Pals its fourth win in 10 games. Prior to the game, the Phone Pals have lost their last four assignments.

May 29: After losing their first two games in the Commissioners Cup with Alex Fraser as their import, Fraser was replaced by their original choice Terquin Mott, who debut with 50 points in giving the Phone Pals their first win in a 94-90 victory over Shell.

== Centennial Cup title ==
Mobiline finally captured a PBA title in a "bonus" tournament called Centennial Cup, the Phone Pals defeated Formula Shell, 67-66, in the one-game finale.

== Runner-up finish ==
The perfect combination of imports Silas Mills and Artemus McClary led Mobiline to the Governor's Cup finals in a rematch with Formula Shell. The Phone Pals played without national team members Jeffrey Cariaso and Andy Seigle for the whole conference, they lost in the championship series that went into a full limit of seven games.

== Awards ==
- Silas Mills was named Governors Cup Best Import.
- Patrick Fran was voted the season's Most Improved Player.

== Roster ==
1998 Mobiline Phone Pals roster
Players

Pos.	#	POB	Name	Height	Weight	DOB (YYYY–MM–DD)	From
G	3	(Philippines)	Antonio Espinosa	5 ft 7 in (1.70 m)			De La Salle
G	8	(Philippines)	Al Solis	5 ft 11 in (1.80 m)			Visayas
G/F	9	(Philippines)	Jose Francisco	6 ft 1 in (1.85 m)			Far Eastern
F	10	(Philippines)	Alvin Teng	6 ft 4 in (1.93 m)			Arellano
G/F	12	(Philippines)	Glenn Capacio	6 ft 1 in (1.85 m)			Far Eastern
F	14	(Philippines)	Eric Reyes	6 ft 4 in (1.93 m)			Ateneo
G	17	(Philippines)	Patrick Fran	6 ft 0 in (1.83 m)			UST
F	22	(Philippines)	Jeffrey Cariaso	6 ft 2 in (1.88 m)			Sonoma State
G/F	24	(Philippines)	Merwin Castelo	6 ft 2 in (1.88 m)			San Beda
F	33	(Philippines)	Joselito Martin	6 ft 3 in (1.91 m)			NCBA
C	52	(United States)	Andy Seigle	6 ft 9 in (2.06 m)			New Orleans
F/C	81	(Philippines)	Gabby Cui	6 ft 4 in (1.93 m)			Ateneo

Coaches

Head coach

- (Philippines) Eric Altamirano

Assistant coach(es)

- (Philippines) Frankie Lim
- (Philippines) Ryan Gregorio

Legend

- (C) Team captain
- Injured

== Transactions ==
=== Trades ===
Off-season	To Sta. Lucia Realtors Richard del Rosario	To Mobiline Phone Pals Gabby Cui
July 1998	To Sta. Lucia Realtors Lowell Briones	To Mobiline Phone Pals Jose Francisco

=== Addition ===
Player	Signed	Former team
Merwin Castelo	Off-season	Alaska Milkmen

=== Subtractions ===
Player	Signed	New team
Franz Pumaren	Off-season	Retired
Ato Agustin	Off-season	Pampanga Dragons (MBA)
Braulio Lim	May 1998	Alaska Milkmen

=== Recruited imports ===
Tournament	Name	Number	Position	University/College	Duration
Commissioner's Cup	Alex Fraser	20	Center-Forward	University of Miami	May 23-26
Commissioner's Cup	Terquin Mott	32	Center-Forward	Coppin State	May 29 to July 17
Governors' Cup	Silas Mills	1	Forward	Utah State	August 30 to December 9
Governors' Cup	Artemus McClary	25	Guard-Forward	Jacksonville	August 30 to December 9
