= Noy Castillo =

Filipino basketball player

Personal information
- Born: August 21, 1974 (age 52) Kentucky, U.S.
- Listed height: 5 ft 11 in (1.80 m)
- Listed weight: 180 lb (82 kg)

Career information
- High school: New Albany (New Albany, Indiana)
- College: The Citadel (1993–1997)
- PBA draft: 1998: 1st round, 2nd overall pick
- Drafted by: San Miguel Beermen
- Playing career: 1998–2008
- Position: Point guard / shooting guard
- Number: 40

Career history
- 1998–1999: Formula Shell Zoom Masters / Shell Velocity
- 2000–2008: Purefoods Tender Juicy Giants

Career highlights
- 4× PBA champion (1998 Governors', 1999 All-Filipino Cup, 2002 Governors', 2006 Philippine); 4x PBA All-Star (1999–2001, 2006); PBA Mythical Second team (2001); PBA Most Improved Player (2001)

Tito "Noy" Castillo (born August 21, 1974) is a Filipino-American former professional basketball player who played for Shell Velocity and Purefoods Tender Juicy Giants in the Philippine Basketball Association (PBA). Known as a great 3-point specialist, he played for New Albany High School in Indiana in high school, then played for four years with The Citadel Bulldogs. In the PBA, he was selected 2nd overall in the 1998 PBA Draft. He went on to play ten seasons in the league, making the All-Star team multiple times, and also played for the Philippine national team.

== High school and college career ==
In high school, Castillo played for New Albany High School in Indiana. In his junior year in 1992, Castillo averaged 17.2 points per game. He was an all-conference selection and was also a 1992 all-state honorable mention.

As a senior in 1993, Castillo averaged 20.9 points per contest. He was an all-conference selection that year and earned UPI All-State third-team honors while also being named to the Louisville Courier-Journal and Bloomington Herald-Times All-State first teams. That year, he led New Albany to a runner-up finish to eventual state champion Jeffersonville.

Castillo graduated in 1993 from New Albany as the school's all-time leading scorer with 1,283 career points. Finishing as a three-time Hoosier Hills All-Conference player. He led his team to a 79–18 record over his career, including four sectional championships and three conference championships.

Castillo then played for four seasons with The Citadel Bulldogs, starting in three of his four years there. He graduated with 1,086 points in 102 games (10.6 ppg) and 78 starts. When he graduated, he also departed as the program's all-time leader in three-pointers made and was also ninth in three-point field goal percentage, 10th in free throw percentage, 10th in assists and third in minutes played.

== Professional career ==
=== Formula Shell Zoom Masters / Shell Velocity ===
Castillo was drafted 2nd overall by the San Miguel Beermen in 1998 but was traded on draft day to the Formula Shell Zoom Masters for 1st overall pick Danny Ildefonso. As the rookie starting point guard, he, alongside two-time MVP Benjie Paras, Gerry Esplana, Vic Pablo, and Chris Jackson, led the franchise to back-to-back titles in the 1998 Governors’ Cup and 1999 All-Filipino Cup in the start of his sophomore season.

=== Purefoods ===
Before the start of the 2000 PBA Season, Castillo was acquired by Purefoods TJ Hotdogs, who traded a 2002 first-round draft pick for his services. Shell traded him to make room for the salaries of Paras and Esplana, and so that he could go to a team where he could have more minutes. In the Governors' Cup, he helped the team make the semifinals.

Castillo led the team in scoring in 2001, taking the team to a semifinals appearance in the 2001 Commissioner's Cup. He made the All-Star team that year, competed in the Two-Ball Competition, was awarded as the Most Improved Player and became a member of the Mythical Second Team. During that season, he played through a toe injury, one he wouldn't get surgery on until after the season.

Castillo won his first title with Purefoods during the 2002 Governor's Cup. He also spent most of the 2002 season on loan to the Philippine national team alongside teammates Andy Seigle and Boyet Fernandez. They made their return to the team during the All-Filipino Cup.

In 2006, Purefoods, now known as the Purefoods Chunkee Giants, made the 2005–06 Fiesta Conference finals against Red Bull Barako, losing in six games. During the Philippine Cup, Castillo strained a calf muscle, causing him to miss several games. He returned in time during the semifinals to become a key weapon in their title run. During the finals, in a rematch against Red Bull, he missed all six of his three-pointers in Game 3. Despite this, he was able to make contributions throughout the finals, especially in Game 6, as Purefoods was able to win this time over Red Bull in seven games. He was also named as an All-Star during the same season. During the 2007–08 season, he played in the 2007–08 PBA Philippine Cup finals against the Sta. Lucia Realtors. Sta. Lucia went on to win the finals in seven games. Because of recurring injuries, he retired from basketball in 2008.

== National team career ==
In 2000, Castillo was a member of the Philippine national team that competed at the FIBA Asia All-Star Extravaganza along former teammates Rodney Santos and Andy Seigle.

In 2002, Castillo made the Philippine roster for the 2002 Asian Games despite coming off a toe injury.

== Personal life ==
Castillo is married with four children and the family currently resides in East Elmhurst, New York.

Since 2006, Castillo has served as the CEO and owner of Brand 40 Custom Team Uniforms, a company that designs and distributes athletic uniforms. He has also been an international project missionary since 2016. He also became an AAU coach. One of the players he coached was Romeo Langford.

In 2002, as he was rehabbing from his toe injury, Castillo and his trainer Mon Macatangay saved two boys from drowning in the deep end of a swimming pool.

== Career statistics ==
=== PBA ===
Year	Team	GP	MPG	FG%	3P%	FT%	RPG	APG	SPG	BPG	PPG
1998	Shell	59	29.9	.390	.378	.796	1.9	1.9	0.4	0.0	9.2
1999	Shell	56	28.8	.381	.319	.734	1.8	1.6	0.1	0.0	8.5
2000	Purefoods	54	35.2	.389	.362	.747	1.7	2.3	0.4	0.0	11.7
2001	Purefoods	45	41.3	.435	.397	.787	1.7	3.5	0.2	0.0	17.4
2002	Purefoods	9	30.0	.393	.417	.750	1.2	2.3	0.3	0.0	12.2
2003	Purefoods	35	37.9	.381	.331	.836	2.1	3.5	0.5	0.0	13.0
2004–05	Purefoods	60	32.7	.443	.325	.750	1.9	2.7	0.2	0.0	10.9
2005–06	Purefoods	51	22.5	.414	.326	.756	1.8	1.5	0.1	0.0	6.2
2006–07	Purefoods	38	18.3	.391	.348	.739	1.1	1.3	0.1	0.0	3.9
2007–08	Purefoods	15	16.4	.463	.333	.444	1.2	1.0	0.0	0.0	3.5
Career		422	30.3	.407	.353	.766	1.7	2.2	0.3	0.0	9.9

=== College ===
Season	Team	G	MP	FG%	3P%	FT%	RPG	APG	SPG	BPG	PPG
1993–94	Citadel	23	10.8	.359	.319	.615	0.8	0.6	0.6	0.0	3.0
1994–95	Citadel	27	33.9	.373	.350	.842	2.1	1.9	0.8	0.0	13.8
1995–96	Citadel	25	35.7	.375	.324	.819	2.7	2.0	0.6	0.0	14.0
1996–97	Citadel	27	35.7	.386	.369	.759	2.9	3.3	0.7	0.0	11.0
Career		102	29.6	.376	.346	.792	2.2	2.0	0.7	0.0	10.6
