= 1998 Pop Cola 800s season =

- Head coach: Norman Black
- General manager: Elmer Yanga
- Owner: RFM Corporation

All-Filipino Cup results
- Record: 11–11 (50%)
- Place: 3rd
- Playoff finish: Semifinals

Commissioner's Cup results
- Record: 7–8 (46.7%)
- Place: 3rd
- Playoff finish: Semifinals

Governors' Cup results
- Record: 8–7 (53.3%)
- Place: 5th
- Playoff finish: Eliminated

Pop Cola 800s seasons

The 1998 Pop Cola 800s season was the 9th season of the franchise in the Philippine Basketball Association (PBA).

== Draft picks ==
Round	Pick	Player	Nationality	College
1	3	Ali Peek	United States	Saint Mary's
1	4	Brixter Encarnacion	Philippines	SSC-Recoletos
2	9	Jasper Ocampo	Philippines	SSC-Recoletos
3		Terrence Bito	United States	Cal State Northridge
4		Jesse Cabanayan	Philippines	Baguio

== Summary ==
After two years and six conferences of non-semifinal appearances, Pop Cola finally made it to the semifinal round in coach Norman Black's first full season with the RFM ballclub. The 800s placed third in the All-Filipino Cup by winning their one-game battle with Sta.Lucia for third place.

NBA journeyman Sean Higgins was Pop Cola's import in the Commissioner's Cup, Higgins lasted eight games and was replaced by Marcus Liberty, who led the 800s to three straight wins and an outright semifinals berth. After the eliminations, Liberty went back to the States to settle a family problem. Sherell Ford, a legitimate NBA first-round pick, plane in for the best-of-five semifinal series against the San Miguel Beermen and scored 42 points in Pop Cola's 97–106 loss in Game one. The Beermen easily won in Game two and Pop Cola coach Norman Black decided for the team to replace Ford. Assistant coach Alfrancis Chua recommended Marcus Timmons, who played for him at Tanduay in the PBL, Timmons' efforts were not enough to hold back the Beermen in the 800s' 79–92 loss in Game three. After Timmons left for Australia, coach Norman Black was forced to play in their game against Formula Shell for third place, Black makes history by becoming the oldest import to play in the league at age 41, leading his team to an 84–80 win over Shell.

Pop Cola had a pair of Victor Page and Paul Graham as their import for the Centennial Cup. After three games, Page was replaced by the comebacking Tony Harris, who led the 800s to four wins in eight games he played before a fracture in his right hand cut short his stint and was replaced by David Booth in their second outing in the Governor's Cup. Pop Cola lost their last game to Purefoods, 95–104 in overtime and the 800s missed out a semifinals berth, finishing one game behind the four semifinalist with eight wins and seven losses.

== Notable dates ==
February 10: Pop Cola pick up their first win of the season after two losses to San Miguel and Alaska by winning over Formula Shell, 88–74.

March 21: Pop Cola smothered a weary Sta.Lucia five, 78–70, for its second straight win in the All-Filipino Cup semifinals. The 800s improved their won-loss record to 7–6.

== Roster ==
1998 Pop Cola 800s roster
Players

Pos.	#	POB	Name	Height	Weight	DOB (YYYY–MM–DD)	From
F	00	(Philippines)	Vergel Meneses	6 ft 3 in (1.91 m)			José Rizal
F/C	2	(United States)	Ali Peek	6 ft 4 in (1.93 m)			Saint Mary's
C	4	(Philippines)	Bonel Balingit	6 ft 9 in (2.06 m)			Visayas
F	5	(Philippines)	Brixter Encarnacion	6 ft 3 in (1.91 m)			San Sebastian
G	6	(Philippines)	Jessie Cabanayan	5 ft 7 in (1.70 m)			Baguio
G	7	(Philippines)	Jasper Ocampo	5 ft 7 in (1.70 m)			San Sebastian
G	9	(Philippines)	Boybits Victoria	5 ft 11 in (1.80 m)			San Beda
G	10	(Philippines)	Boyet Fernandez	5 ft 8 in (1.73 m)			San Agustin
F	11	(Philippines)	Marcelino Morelos	6 ft 2 in (1.88 m)			UE
F	15	(Philippines)	Dwight Lago	6 ft 0 in (1.83 m)			De La Salle
F	33	(United States)	Nic Belasco	6 ft 6 in (1.98 m)			Notre Dame
C	35	(Philippines)	Zaldy Realubit	6 ft 6 in (1.98 m)			USJ–R

Coaches

Head coach

- (Philippines) Norman Black

Assistant coach(es)

- (Philippines) Alfrancis Chua
- (Philippines) Franz Pumaren

Team manager

- (Philippines) Elmer Yanga

Legend

- (C) Team captain
- Injured

== Transactions ==
=== Recruited imports ===
Tournament	Name	Number	Position	University/College	Duration
Commissioner's Cup	Sean Higgins	3	Forward	University of Michigan	May 22 to June 16
Commissioner's Cup	Marcus Liberty	32	Forward	University of Illinois	June 21 to July 3
Commissioner's Cup	Sherell Ford		Forward	UIC	July 19–21
Commissioner's Cup	Marcus Timmons		Forward	Southern Illinois	July 24 (one game)
Commissioner's Cup	Norman Black	24	Center-Forward	Saint Joseph's	August 2 (one game)
Governors' Cup	Victor Page	12	Guard	Georgetown	August 28 to September 5
Governors' Cup	Paul Graham	8	Guard	Ohio	August 28 to November 3
Governors' Cup	Tony Harris	22	Guard-Forward	UNO	September 8 to October 9
Governors' Cup	David Booth		Forward	DePaul	October 16 to November 3
