= 1998 San Miguel Beermen season =

- Head coach: Ron Jacobs
- Owner(s): San Miguel Corporation

All-Filipino Cup results
- Record: 18–10 (64.3%)
- Place: 2nd
- Playoff finish: Finals (def. by Alaska 3–4)

Commissioner's Cup results
- Record: 12–9 (57.1%)
- Place: 2nd
- Playoff finish: Finals (def. by Alaska 2-4)

Governors Cup results
- Record: 13–12 (52%)
- Place: 4th
- Playoff finish: Semifinals (def. by Shell)

San Miguel Beermen seasons

The 1998 San Miguel Beermen season was the 24th season of the franchise in the Philippine Basketball Association (PBA).

== Draft picks ==
Round	Pick	Player	Nationality	College
1	2	Noy Castillo	United States	The Citadel
1	5	William Antonio	United States	Chaminade

== Notable dates ==
February 1: San Miguel Beermen got excellent debuts from its two rookies Danny Ildefonso and Steve Smith as the Beermen pulled away with an 86-67 rout of Pop Cola at the start of the All-Filipino Cup.

April 14: San Miguel booked the first finals seat in the All-Filipino Cup with their 14th win against six losses, defeating Pop Cola, 89-69.

== Runner-up finish ==
After two seasons of non-finals appearance, the San Miguel Beermen return to the championship series twice in the season but could only end up with runner-up finishes. The Beermen placed second behind Alaska Milkmen in the eliminations of the All-Filipino Cup with seven wins and four losses. They won eight games in the semifinals for a league-best 15-6 won-loss record. The Beermen played the Alaska Milkmen in the best-of-seven championship. In the battle between two American coaches, Ron Jacobs and Alaska's Tim Cone, the Beermen blew a 3-2 series advantage, they lost Game six by a big margin and in the deciding seventh game on May 8, the San Miguel Beermen folded up to the pressure as the game reaches its climax, losing by nine points to Alaska Milkmen, 63-72, before a jampacked crowd at the Araneta Coliseum.

In the Commissioner's Cup, the Beermen bring back last year's best import Jeff Ward, who was good for only six games when coach Ron Jacobs gambled on a smaller import in the returning Lamont Strothers. The Beermen scored a 3-0 sweep over Pop Cola in the best-of-five semifinal series and went on to play the Alaska Milkmen in a championship rematch. The Milkmen paraded a taller import Devin Davis and they jump off to a 2-0 series lead in the best-of-seven finals, the Beermen were able to tie the series at two games apiece by winning Games three and four, but Alaska came back with a victory in Game five and finish off the Beermen in six games.

== Roster ==
1998 San Miguel Beermen roster
Players

Pos.	#	POB	Name	Height	Weight	DOB (YYYY–MM–DD)	From
G	4	(Philippines)	Siot Tanquingcen	5 ft 9 in (1.75 m)			UST
C	5	(Philippines)	Ronilo Padilla	6 ft 5 in (1.96 m)			Cebu
G	7	(Philippines)	Michael Mustre	6 ft 0 in (1.83 m)			Letran
F	8	(Philippines)	Allan Caidic	6 ft 2 in (1.88 m)			UE
C	10	(Philippines)	Danny Ildefonso	6 ft 6 in (1.98 m)			National-U
F	11	(Philippines)	Nelson Asaytono	6 ft 3 in (1.91 m)			Manila
F/C	12	(Philippines)	Yves Dignadice	6 ft 4 in (1.93 m)			STI WNU
F	14	(Philippines)	Joey Santamaria	6 ft 3 in (1.91 m)			De La Salle
G	15	(Philippines)	Edward Naron	6 ft 1 in (1.85 m)			Visayas
G	17	(Philippines)	Olsen Racela	5 ft 11 in (1.80 m)			Ateneo
F	18	(Philippines)	Art Dela Cruz	6 ft 2 in (1.88 m)			San Sebastian
F/C	25	(Philippines)	Freddie Abuda	6 ft 4 in (1.93 m)			Cebu
F	28	(Philippines)	Elpidio Villamin	6 ft 2 in (1.88 m)
G	34	(United States)	William Antonio	6 ft 3 in (1.91 m)			Chaminade
G	42	(United States)	Steven Smith	6 ft 0 in (1.83 m)			US International

Coaches

Head coach

- (United States) Ron Jacobs
- (Philippines) Pilo Pumaren

Assistant coach(es)

- (Philippines) Jong Uichico
- (Philippines) Allan Caidic

Legend

- (C) Team captain
- Injured

== Transactions ==
=== Trades ===
Off-season	To Formula Shell Noy Castillo	To San Miguel Danny Ildefonso

Off-season	To Gordon's Gin Paul Alvarez	To San Miguel Steven Smith

=== Additions ===
Player	Signed	Former team
Joey Santamaria	Off-season	Mobiline Phone Pals
Elpidio Villamin	Off-season	Mobiline Phone Pals

=== Recruited imports ===
Tournament	Name	Number	Position	University/College	Duration
Commissioner's Cup	Jeff Ward	21	Center-Forward	Tiffin University	May 23 to June 14
Commissioner's Cup	Lamont Strothers	42	Guard-Forward	Christopher Newport	June 20 to August 14; August 30 to December 1
Commissioner's Cup; Governor's Cup	Lamont Strothers	42	Guard-Forward	Christopher Newport	June 20 to August 14; August 30 to December 1
Governors' Cup	Lamont Strothers	42	Guard-Forward	Christopher Newport	June 20 to August 14; August 30 to December 1
Governors' Cup	Larry Robinson	20	Guard-Forward	Centenary College	August 30 to December 1
