= 1998 PBA Centennial Cup =

Special tournament held by the PBA during the season

- Duration: August 28 - October 6, 1998
- TV partner(s): VTV (IBC)

Finals
- Champions: Mobiline Phone Pals
- Runners-up: Formula Shell Zoom Masters

PBA conference chronology
- < 1998 Commissioner's 1998 Governors' >

The 1998 PBA Centennial Cup was a special tournament held by the PBA during the season. The event was a reference to the Philippines celebration in the Centennial year of the country's independence.

The teams in this conference are required to have two American imports.

The Mobiline Phone Pals won the tournament over Formula Shell Zoom Masters in the one-game championship.

== Imports ==
Team	Import combination	Win–loss
Alaska Milkmen	Sean Chambers & Monty Buckley	4-4
Formula Shell Zoom Masters	John Best & Donald Williams	6-4
Ginebra San Miguel	Dennis Edwards & John Strickland	2-1
Ginebra San Miguel	Dennis Edwards & Frank Western	4-3
Mobiline Phone Pals	Silas Mills & Tee McClary	7-3
Pop Cola 800	Paul Graham & Victor Page	2-1
Pop Cola 800	Paul Graham & Tony Harris	4-3
Purefoods TJ Hotdogs	Bob McCann & Rodney Monroe	1-3
Purefoods TJ Hotdogs	Bob McCann & Lance Miller	4-0
San Miguel Beermen	Larry Robinson & Lamont Strothers	4-4
Sta. Lucia Realtors	Jojo English & Kirk King	0-3
Sta. Lucia Realtors	Andre Perry & Bobby Allen	1-3
Sta. Lucia Realtors	Andre Perry & Joseph Temple	0-1

== Elimination round ==
Pos	Team	W	L	PCT	GB	Qualification
1	Ginebra San Miguel	6	2	.750	—	Semifinals
2	Mobiline Phone Pals	5	3	.625 (Note: Head-to-head quotient: Mobiline 1.142, Pop Cola 0.995, Shell 0.973, Purefoods 0.915)	1	Semifinals
3	Pop Cola 800s	5	3	.625	1	Semifinals
4	Formula Shell Zoom Masters	5	3	.625	1	Semifinals
5	Purefoods TJ Hotdogs	5	3	.625	1	
6	San Miguel Beermen	4	4	.500	2	
7	Alaska Milkmen	4	4	.500	2	
8	Philippine Centennial Team (G)	1	7	.125 (Note: Head-to-head record: Philippine Centennial Team 1–0 Sta. Lucia)	5	
9	Sta. Lucia Realtors	1	7	.125	5	

(G) Guests

== Bracket ==
Semifinals
1	Ginebra (OT)	75
4	Shell	78
2	Mobiline	74
3	Pop Cola	71

Finals
4	Shell (OT)	66
2	Mobiline	67
Battle-for-third
1	Ginebra	71
3	Pop Cola	85

== Semifinals ==
VTV

October 4

Mobiline Phone Pals 74, Pop Cola 800s 71

Cuneta Astrodome, Pasay

VTV

October 4

Ginebra San Miguel 75, Formula Shell Zoom Masters 78 (OT)

Cuneta Astrodome, Pasay

== Third place playoff ==
VTV

October 6

Ginebra San Miguel 71, Pop Cola 800s 85

Cuneta Astrodome, Pasay

== Championship ==
VTV

October 6

Mobiline Phone Pals 67, Formula Shell Zoom Masters 66 (OT)

Cuneta Astrodome, Pasay
