= 1998 Purefoods Tender Juicy Hotdogs season =

- Head coach: Eric Altamirano; Chito Narvasa
- General manager: Simon Mossesgeld
- Owner: Purefoods Corporation

All-Filipino Cup results
- Record: 8–13 (38.1%)
- Place: 5th
- Playoff finish: Semifinals

Commissioner's Cup results
- Record: 5–8 (38.5%)
- Place: 5th
- Playoff finish: Quarterfinals

Governors Cup results
- Record: 14–11 (56%)
- Place: 3rd
- Playoff finish: Semifinals

Purefoods Tender Juicy Hotdogs seasons

The 1998 Purefoods Carne Norte Beefies season was the 11th season of the franchise in the Philippine Basketball Association (PBA). The team was named Purefoods Carne Norte Beefies in the All-Filipino Cup.

== Draft picks ==
Round	Pick	Player	Nationality	College
1	7	Henry Fernandez	Philippines	University of Visayas
2	15	Ulysses Tanique	Philippines	SSC-Recoletos

== Summary ==
Purefoods lost their first four games in the All-Filipino Cup before picking up their first win against Shell. The Carne Norte Beefies makes it to the semifinals with an 81–75 victory over Sta.Lucia on March 13. The Beefies could only finish with five wins and six losses in the eliminations and won just three of their 10 semifinal assignments and for a team that has played in 9 of the last 10 All-Filipino finals, the Purefoods franchise dropped to their lowest standing in the All-Filipino tournament at fifth place.

Former Purefoods import Kenny Redfield, whose last two seasons he played with were Shell and Sta.Lucia, is back for the Hotdogs in the Commissioner's Cup. Redfield was older and slower this time and was replaced after three games by Khari Jaxon, who lasted one game and scored only six points in a forgettable debut in Purefoods' 65–79 loss to Mobiline on June 5. Jaxon suffered a leg injury and the Hotdogs had to play their next game without an import. Jaxon's replacement was Roy Hairston, who led the Tender Juicy Hotdogs to victories in their last two games in the eliminations as they end up with five wins and six losses again after 11 games in the eliminations. Despite the twice-to-beat advantage against Formula Shell, the Hotdogs were beaten twice and were booted out from the final four semifinals.

Former imports Bob McCann and Rodney Monroe were the Hotdogs' reinforcement starting with the sideshow Centennial Cup, Monroe was replaced by Lance Miller after four games. Purefoods finishes with a 12-9 won-loss slate in the four-team, double round carryover semifinals, they lost a playoff game to Mobiline for one of the two finals berth. The Hotdogs won their third place series against San Miguel Beermen for their first-ever third-place finish in franchise history.

== Notable dates ==
February 27: After the Beefies held the San Miguel Beermen to a record-low 49 points in a 70–49 victory three nights before, the Beefies won their third straight game from a 0–4 start, defeating unbeaten Alaska Milkmen, 83–68, and snapped Alaska's five-game winning streak and handed their first loss in the season.

March 8: Purefoods scored a 93–80 victory over Gordon's Gin as they spoil the birthday of Boars playing-coach Sonny Jaworski and climbed up to a tie with Pop Cola in the standings at four wins and five loss.

== Occurrences ==
On March 21, Purefoods formally announced the resignation of head coach Eric Altamirano, who had a contract dispute with the management which did not want to give him a sizeable increase and a guaranteed contract until the end of the 1999 season, Altamirano moved over to Mobiline Phone Pals beginning the Commissioner's Cup, signing a four-year guaranteed contract that has doubled his money earning as that of his stint with Purefoods. Replacing Altamirano at the Purefoods' bench is their former assistant and Shell mentor Chito Narvasa.

== Roster ==
1998 Purefoods Tender Juicy Hotdogs roster
Players

Pos.	#	POB	Name	Height	Weight	DOB (YYYY–MM–DD)	From
G/F	1	(Philippines)	Bong Ravena	6 ft 1 in (1.85 m)			UE
G/F	3	(Philippines)	Elmer Lago	6 ft 3 in (1.91 m)			De La Salle
G	4	(Philippines)	Ulysses Tanigue	5 ft 9 in (1.75 m)			San Sebastian
F	5	(Philippines)	Edmund Reyes	6 ft 3 in (1.91 m)			UST
F	7	(Philippines)	Rey Evangelista	6 ft 3 in (1.91 m)			UST
G	8	(Philippines)	Genesis Sasuman	5 ft 11 in (1.80 m)			Letran
G	10	(Philippines)	Dindo Pumaren	5 ft 9 in (1.75 m)			De La Salle
C	11	(Philippines)	Edward Joseph Feihl	7 ft 1 in (2.16 m)			Adamson
F	16	(Philippines)	Alvin Patrimonio	6 ft 3 in (1.91 m)			Mapúa
F	22	(Philippines)	Henry Fernandez	6 ft 1 in (1.85 m)			Visayas
F/C	27	(Philippines)	Stevenson Solomon	6 ft 4 in (1.93 m)			San Sebastian
C	44	(Philippines)	Jerry Codinera	6 ft 5 in (1.96 m)			UE

Coaches

Head coach

- (Philippines) Chito Narvasa

Assistant coach(es)

- (Philippines) Louie Alas
- (Philippines) Bong Go

Legend

- (C) Team captain
- Injured

=== Additions ===
Player	Signed	Former team
Stevenson Solomon	Off-season	Ginebra (1995)

=== Recruited imports ===
Tournament	Name	Number	Position	University/College	Duration
Commissioner's Cup	Kenny Redfield	3	Guard-Forward	Michigan State	May 22–30
Commissioner's Cup	Khari Jaxon	23	Forward	University of New Mexico	June 5 (one game)
Commissioner's Cup	Roy Hairston	12	Guard-Forward	Purdue University	June 16 to July 19
Governors' Cup	Rodney Monroe	21	Guard	North Carolina State	August 28 to September 13
Governors' Cup	Lance Miller	14	Guard	Villanova University	September 18 to December 1
Governors' Cup	Bob McCann	30	Center	Morehead State	August 28 to December 1
