= 1998 Sta. Lucia Realtors season =

- Head coach: Derrick Pumaren
- Owner: Sta. Lucia Realty and Development Corporation

All-Filipino Cup results
- Record: 12–11 (52.2%)
- Place: 4th
- Playoff finish: Semifinals

Commissioner's Cup results
- Record: 4–7 (36.4%)
- Place: 8th
- Playoff finish: Eliminated

Governor's Cup results
- Record: 5–10 (33.3%)
- Place: 8th
- Playoff finish: Eliminated

Sta. Lucia Realtors seasons

The 1998 Sta. Lucia Realtors season was the 6th season of the franchise in the Philippine Basketball Association (PBA).

== Draft pick ==
Round	Pick	Player	Nationality	College
1	6	Aramis Calpito	Philippines	San Sebastian

== Summary ==
Under new coach Derrick Pumaren, Sta. Lucia won their first four games in the All-Filipino Cup. However, the Realtors lost their last five outings in the eliminations and dropped to five wins and six losses. In the semifinal round, the Realtors won four of their first five games, including victories over the top two teams, Alaska and San Miguel. The Realtors clinched a playoff spot for a second finals berth via win 7-of-10 semifinals incentive when they defeated Purefoods Carne Norte Beefies, 92–77 on April 14. Having beaten the Alaska Milkmen twice in the semifinals, the Realtors blew a golden opportunity to advance in the finals series for the first time in franchise history when they bowed to the Milkmen, 69-77, in their playoff game on April 21 for the right to face San Miguel Beermen for the All-Filipino Cup crown.

In the Commissioner's Cup, after losing their first game to San Miguel in Urdaneta, Pangasinan, Sta. Lucia import Melvin Cheatum abandoned the team and left quickly; he could only score four points in a brief stint. The Realtors scored their first win in their next game, playing all-Filipino. Former Pepsi import and one-time Best Import awardee Ronnie Coleman was on his third year of duty and was tapped to play for Sta. Lucia. The Realtors ended up in last place in the conference.

Without the duo of Jun Limpot and Dennis Espino, who were members of the national team, the Realtors chalk up only one win in eight outings during the Centennial Cup, and their lone victory came after replacing imports Jo Jo English and Kirk King with the tandem of Andre Perry and Bobby Allen, who played for Sta. Lucia three years prior. With one game left in their Centennial Cup campaign, Allen was replaced by Joseph Temple, who teamed up with Perry for the rest of their games in the Governor's Cup. The Realtors won four of their next seven matches, but still fell short and placed last.

== Notable dates ==
February 3: Limpot scored a game-high 34 points as the Realtors thrashed the Shell Zoom Masters, 85-69.

February 15: Sta. Lucia led by 20 points in the second half and coasted to an 83-72 rout off Pop Cola for its fourth straight win and leadership in the All-Filipino Cup.

March 24: Ronnie Magsanoc canned two free throws off Johnny Abarrientos' foul to hold back title favorite Alaska Milkmen, 77-74, for its second win in three starts in the semifinals.

March 27: The Realtors bested San Miguel Beermen for the first time in the season, 78-70, with Jack Santiago filling Magsanoc's shoes nicely as he scored a career high 18 points.

== Roster ==
1998 Sta. Lucia Realtors roster
Players

Pos.	#	POB	Name	Height	Weight	DOB (YYYY–MM–DD)	From
G	1	(Philippines)	Jason Webb	6 ft 2 in (1.88 m)			De La Salle
G	4	(Philippines)	Gerardo Santiago	5 ft 10 in (1.78 m)			Mapúa
G	5	(Philippines)	Ronnie Magsanoc	5 ft 9 in (1.75 m)			UP Diliman
F/C	7	(Philippines)	Richard del Rosario	6 ft 5 in (1.96 m)			De La Salle
G/F	9	(Philippines)	Boy Cabahug	5 ft 11 in (1.80 m)			Visayas
F	10	(Philippines)	Aramis Calpito	6 ft 5 in (1.96 m)			San Sebastian
F	11	(Philippines)	Expedito Falcasantos	6 ft 4 in (1.93 m)			Cebu
G/F	14	(Philippines)	Lowell Briones	6 ft 3 in (1.91 m)			Visayas
F/C	16	(Philippines)	Dennis Espino	6 ft 6 in (1.98 m)			UST
F	57	(Philippines)	Romeo dela Rosa	6 ft 3 in (1.91 m)			Southwestern-U
F/C	72	(Philippines)	Jun Limpot	6 ft 5 in (1.96 m)			La Salle

Coaches
Head coach
- (Philippines) Derrick Pumaren
Assistant(s)
- (Philippines) Adonis Tierra
- (Philippines) Ricky Cui
- (Philippines) Joshua Villapando

Legend
- (DP) Unsigned draft pick
- (FA) Free agent
- (S) Suspended
- Injured

== Transactions ==
=== Trades ===
Off-season	To Shell Gerald Esplana	To Sta. Lucia Ronnie Magsanoc
Off-season	To Mobiline Gabby Cui	To 'Sta. Lucia Richard del Rosario
July 1998	To Mobiline Jose Francisco	To Sta. Lucia Lowell Briones

=== Recruited imports ===
Tournament	Name	Number	Position	University/college	Duration
Commissioner's Cup	Melvin Cheatum	44	Forward	University of Alabama	May 23 (one game)
Commissioner's Cup	Ronnie Coleman	24	Center	Southern California	May 30 to July 7
Governors' Cup	Jo Jo English	3	Guard-Forward	South Carolina	August 28 to September 6
Governors' Cup	Kirk King	32	Forward	University of Connecticut	August 28 to September 6
Governors' Cup	Andre Perry	21	Forward	University of Alabama	September 13 to November 3
Governors' Cup	Robert Francis Allen	44	Guard	UTPA	September 13-26
Governors' Cup	Joseph Temple	24	Guard	University of San Diego	September 29 to November 3
