= 1998 Ginebra San Miguel season =

Season for Philippine basketball team

- Head coach: Robert Jaworski; Rino Salazar (interim, starting March 31: election campaign period)
- General manager: Bernabe Navarro
- Owner: La Tondeña Distillers Inc.

All-Filipino Cup results
- Record: 7–14 (33.3%)
- Place: 6th
- Playoff finish: Semifinals

Commissioner's Cup results
- Record: 4–7 (36.4%)
- Place: 7th
- Playoff finish: Eliminated

Governors Cup results
- Record: 7–8 (46.7%)
- Place: 6th
- Playoff finish: Eliminated

Ginebra San Miguel seasons

The 1998 Ginebra San Miguel season was the 20th season of the franchise in the Philippine Basketball Association (PBA). Formerly known as Gordon's Gin Boars in the All-Filipino Cup, the team revert to their former name Ginebra San Miguel starting the Commissioner's Cup.

== Draft picks ==
Round	Pick	Player	Nationality	College
1	8	Steven Smith	United States	US International
2	16	Erwin Framo	Philippines	Manila

== Summary ==
The Boars won three of their first four games in the season. They finished with five wins and six losses after the eliminations and tied with three other teams. The Boars placed last among the six semifinalist, winning only two out of their 10 outings.

Import Chris King was recalled for the Commissioner's Cup. The defending champions failed to defend their crown and had to win their last game against Sta.Lucia to tie the Realtors at the bottom of the standings with four wins and seven losses. Chris King already left and was replaced by Mike Cumberland in their last game in the eliminations.

In the special conference called Centennial Cup, Ginebra had the best record of six wins and two losses, the Gin Kings lost to Formula Shell in a one-game semifinal playoff.

Import problems bugged them virtually in the two-import conference from the Centennial Cup to the Governors Cup, starting with their original choices Dennis Edwards and John Strickland. After three games, Strickland was replaced by Frank Western, who played eight games while Edwards saw action in 12 games. After a four-game losing streak, Western and Edwards were replaced by Wayman Strickland and DeWayne Wesley. After one forgettable outing in Ginebra's 79–90 loss to Sta.Lucia in Urdaneta, Pangasinan, Wesley was sent home and coming in was Joe Wylie, who played three games. Ginebra won only once in the Governors Cup and in a desperate bid to gain a seat in the semifinal round, coach Jaworski signed up Kenny Payne, the Philadelphia 76ers' 1st-round pick in the NBA in 1989, and former Portland Trail Blazer Rick Brunson, going into their last game against Formula Shell on November 6, Payne and Brunson combined for 58 points but the Ginebras still lost, 97–107.

== Occurrences ==
On March 31, the Living Legend of Philippine Basketball, Robert Jaworski announced he was taking a leave of absence to concentrate on the campaign trail where the Big J is running for senator in the coming Philippine presidential elections in May. Jaworski won his new ballgame in politics and claimed a seat in the Philippine Senate after the elections.

The season ended for Ginebra with Senator Robert Jaworski resigning from the La Tondeña ballclub during a press conference held in December, ending a partnership that lasted for 14 years in protest over the company's non-consultation of him in certain matters regarding the team, it all started when management accepted Allan Caidic from San Miguel Beermen as assistant playing coach without consulting the former Ginebra playing coach.

== Roster ==
1998 Ginebra San Miguel roster
Players

Pos.	#	POB	Name	Height	Weight	DOB (YYYY–MM–DD)	From
G	1	(Philippines)	Bal David	5 ft 9 in (1.75 m)			UST
F	6	(Philippines)	Noli Locsin	6 ft 3 in (1.91 m)			De La Salle
G/F	11	(Philippines)	Jayvee Gayoso	6 ft 2 in (1.88 m)			Ateneo
G	12	(Philippines)	Vince Hizon	6 ft 2 in (1.88 m)			Ateneo
C	13	(Philippines)	Marlou Aquino	6 ft 9 in (2.06 m)			Adamson
F	16	(Philippines)	Benny Cheng	6 ft 3 in (1.91 m)			Mapúa
F	17	(Philippines)	Terry Saldaña	6 ft 3 in (1.91 m)			Letran
F/C	18	(Philippines)	Wilmer Ong	6 ft 4 in (1.93 m)			USLS
F	23	(Philippines)	Paul Alvarez	6 ft 0 in (1.83 m)			San Sebastian
C	24	(Philippines)	Cris Bolado	6 ft 7 in (2.01 m)			National-U
G	25	(Philippines)	Pido Jarencio	5 ft 10 in (1.78 m)			UST
G	52	(Philippines)	Robert Jaworski, Jr.	6 ft 2 in (1.88 m)			Ateneo

Coaches

Head coach

- (Philippines) Robert Jaworski

Assistant coach(es)

- (Philippines) Rino Salazar
- (Philippines) Philip Cezar

Legend

- (C) Team captain
- Injured

=== Recruited imports ===
Tournament	Name	Number	Position	University/College	Duration
Commissioner's Cup	Chris King	3	Forward-Center	Wake Forest	May 22 to June 26
Commissioner's Cup	Mike Cumberland	21	Forward	Pepperdine	July 7 (one game)
Governors' Cup	John Strickland	50	Center-Forward	Hawaii Pacific	August 28 to September 6
Governors' Cup	Dennis Edwards	32	Forward	Fort Hays State	August 28 to October 11
Governors' Cup	Frank Western	45	Forward	Providence College	September 11 to October 11
Governors' Cup	DuWayne Wesley	3	Guard	UNO	October 17 (one game)
Governors' Cup	Wayman Strickland	10	Forward	University of San Diego	October 17–27
Governors' Cup	Joe Wylie	15	Forward	University of Miami	October 20–27
Governors' Cup	Kenny Payne	21	Forward	University of Louisville	November 6 (one game)
Governors' Cup	Rick Brunson	4	Guard	Temple University	November 6 (one game)
