= University of Baguio =

Private university in Baguio, Philippines

- Pamantasan ng Baguio (Filipino)
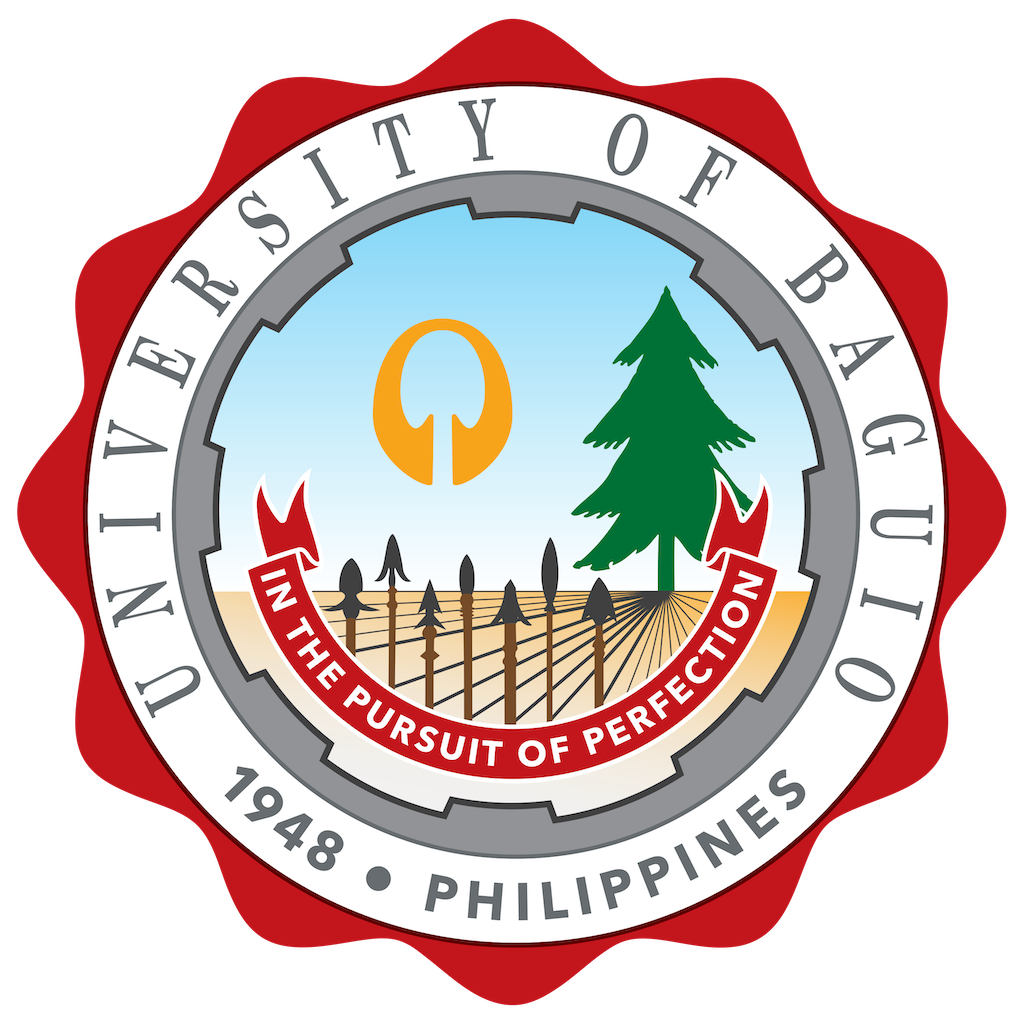
- Former names: Baguio Technical and Commercial Institute (1948‑1950); Baguio Technical and Commercial College (1950‑1969)
- Motto: In the Pursuit of Perfection
- Type: Private, Non-sectarian Research Coeducational Basic and Higher education institution
- Established: August 8, 1948; 78 years ago
- Founders: Fernando Bautista; Rosa Castillo Bautista
- Chairman: Zorba Bnn R. Bautista, M.D., DPBS
- President: Javier Herminio D. Bautista
- Students: 18,000 (Tertiary, est. 2018)
- Location: General Luna Rd., Baguio, Benguet, Philippines; 16°24′56″N 120°35′51″E
- Alma Mater song: UB Loyalty Song
Sports
basketball volleyball table tennis	badminton chess athletics
- Colors: Red and Gray
- Nickname: Cardinals
- Sporting affiliations: BBEAL
- Website: ubaguio.edu
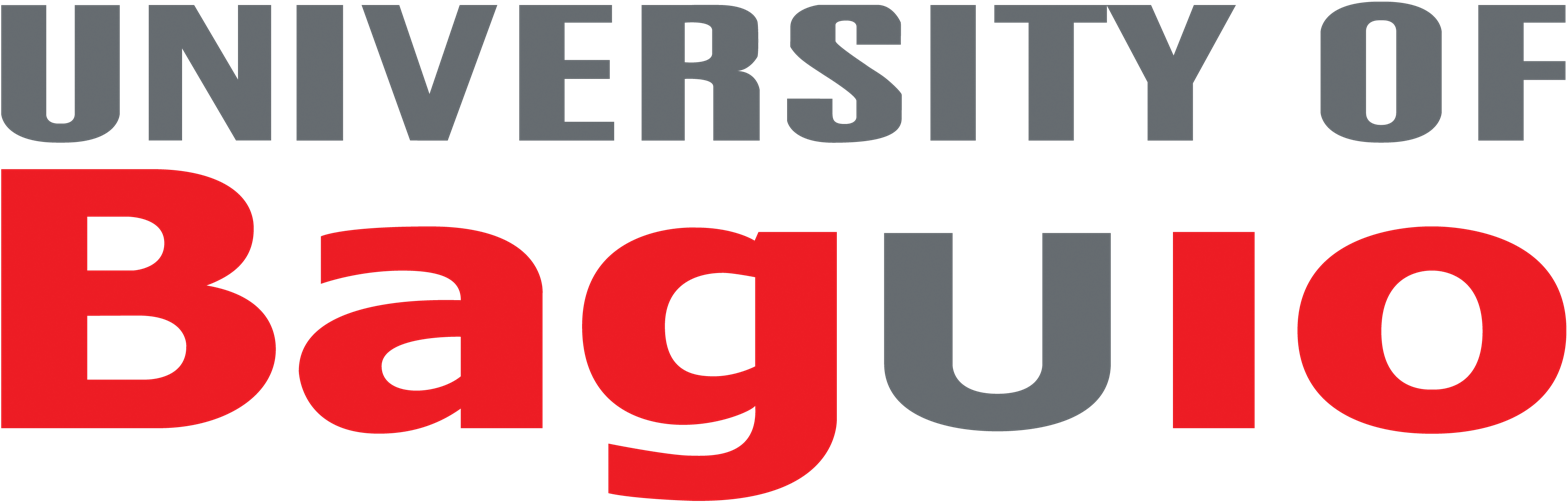

- Location in Luzon Location in the Philippines

The University of Baguio (UB; Filipino: Pamantasan ng Baguio), formerly Baguio Technical and Commercial Institute (Baguio Tech), is a private, Filipino, multidisciplinary, autonomous university in Baguio, Philippines. It was founded by Fernando Gonzaga Bautista and Rosa Castillo Bautista on August 8, 1948, with 80 students. As of 2018, the university had an enrollment of about 18,000 students.

== History ==
=== Founding ===
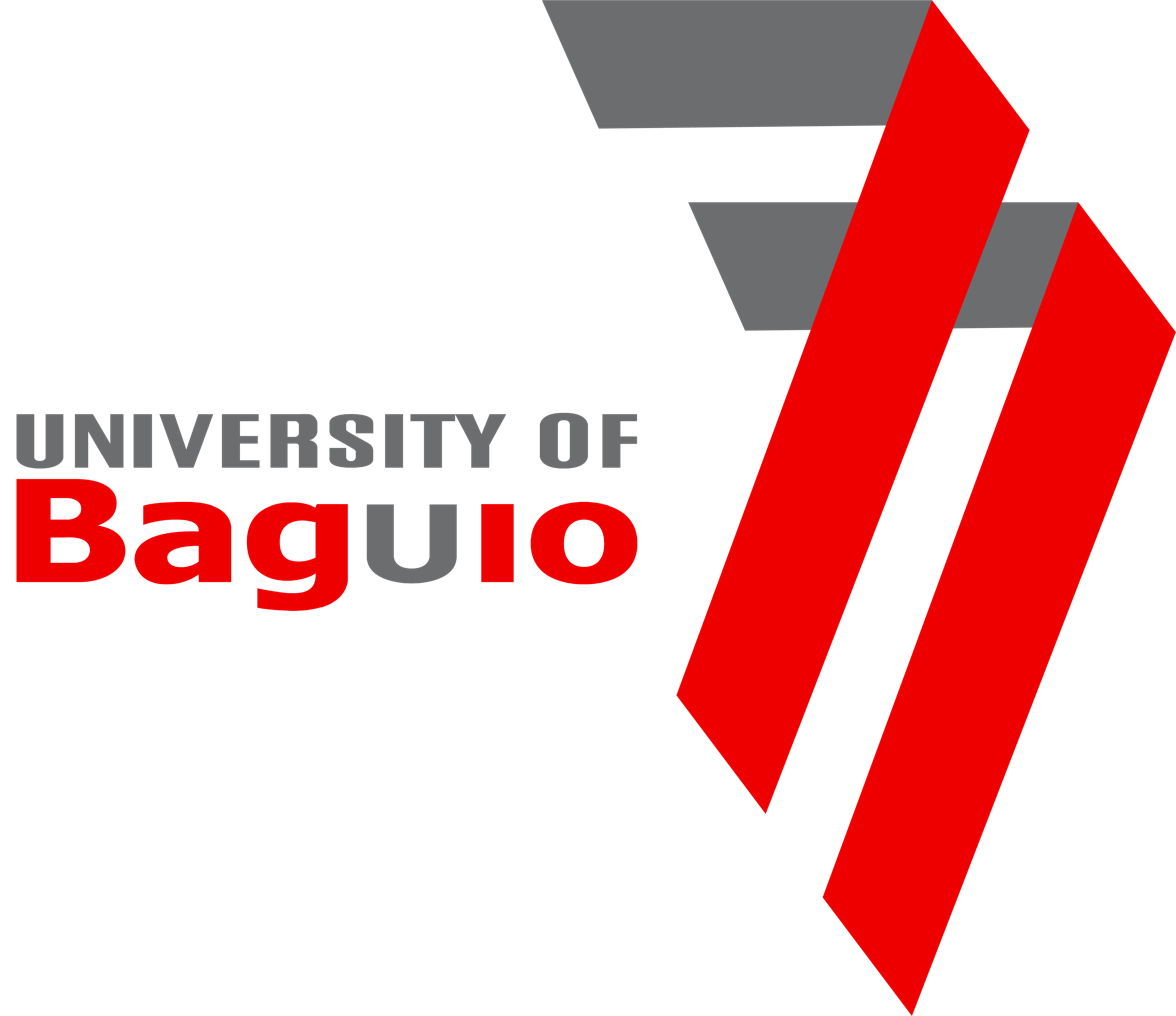
Logo of the University of Baguio during its 77th Founding Anniversary last 2025.

The Baguio Technical and Commercial Institute, also known as Baguio Tech, was founded on August 8, 1948 by Fernando Bautista and his wife Rosa Bautista. It first offered tertiary programs in 1950. It received university status in 1969 and was named University of Baguio.

=== 1990 earthquake ===
The University of Baguio was affected by the 1990 Luzon earthquake. 23 people were reported dead when a building at the university collapsed. Students jumped screaming from the 10-storey commerce building of the university as it began to shake, and the floors collapsed.

Following the earthquake, the University of Baguio implemented a take home learning system, and formal classes resumed in October 1990.

=== Recent developments ===
The university was given autonomous status by the Commission on Higher Education in 2016.

== Organization and administration ==
The University of Baguio is governed by a board of directors. Its current chairperson is Zorba Bnn R. Bautista.

Presidents of the University of Baguio
President	Term
Fernando Bautista	1948-1971
Fernando Bautista Jr.	1971-1980
Reinaldo Bautista	1980-1989
Wilfredo Wi	1989-1992
Virgilio C. Bautista	1992-2004
Herminio C. Bautista	2004-2009
Johann Ben A. Bautista	2009–2015
Dhanna Kerina Bautista-Rodas	2015–2018
Javier Herminio D. Bautista	2018–present

The university is a member of the following associations:

- Philippine Association of Colleges and Universities (PACU)
- Philippine Association of Colleges and Universities Commission on Accreditation (PACUCOA)
- Baguio-Benguet Educational Athletic League (BBEAL)

== Academics ==
University of Baguio

The University of Baguio offers 21 undergraduate programs, 12 graduate programs, and 10 short-term programs across 11 colleges; a Preparatory High School; Science High School; and a Grade School. It has grown to be an institution of close to 18,000 students and more than 400 faculty members.

During its 65th anniversary in 2013, the university is the first HEI that offered Forensic Science program in the country. It also offered the first Music program in Northern Luzon.

The university has facilities and equipment such as science, technical, and computer laboratories; libraries; multi-purpose and function halls; an audio-visual center; a 3,500-seat gymnasium and a fitness gym; a 25m size swimming pool; a dental/medical laboratory, x-ray laboratory; a research center; and a community outreach center.

=== Schools (Higher education) ===
- Business Administration and Accountancy
- Criminal Justice and Public Safety
- Dentistry
- Engineering & Architecture
- Information Technology
- International Tourism & Tourism Management
- Law
- Natural Sciences
- Nursing
- Teacher Education and Liberal Arts

=== Basic education ===
==== University of Baguio Laboratory Elementary School ====
The University of Baguio Laboratory Elementary School is the basic education unit of the university offering programs from kindergarten to Grade 6.

==== University of Baguio Preparatory High School ====
The University of Baguio High School, also known as UB High School, is the mother-department of the University of Baguio. The high school department was established at the same year as university in 1948.

==== University of Baguio Science High School ====
The University of Baguio Science High School, otherwise known as Science High, is the science department of the university. In 1963, sixth grade students from the high school (and some from the city) took a special examination. Passers of the test were put in one class called the Special Science Scholars Section or SSSS. Following the test, an annual scholarship examination was administered for the best and brightest pupils. Thus, in 1967, the University of Baguio Science High School ushered its first graduates. In 1970, the UB Science High Schools received its legal recognition.

The first true high school varsity team is the Greyhounds. The first mixed youth choir in Baguio is the Sonus Juventus. The first socially relevant programs conducted in a secondary school is the Immersion Camps and Outreach.

== Research ==
The Research and Development Center is the research unit of the university. It was established on May 3, 1966, and published the Baguio Tech Journal. It is devoted to research on the culture of ethnic groups in the region and on issues on education in Northern Luzon. Upon reaching university status in 1969, the journal was renamed to University of Baguio Research Journal.

== Athletics ==
The University of Baguio is home to an assortment of athletic organizations. The UB Cardinals is the head name of many teams in the school: basketball, volleyball, table tennis, badminton, chess, and athletics. Football was once a major sport in the university but was removed recently.

UB is in partnership with the multi-award-winning taekwondo team of Baguio, the Baguio Defenders. UB has a national award-winning team of Arnisadors or Arnis players and judo players.

The university is a member of the Baguio-Benguet Educational Athletic League or BBEAL along with several top universities in the city.

== Notable alumni ==
- Nesthy Petecio - Paris 2024 Olympics bronze medalist and Tokyo 2020 Olympics silver medalist in boxing
- Carlo Paalam - Tokyo 2020 Olympics silver medalist in boxing
- Eumir Marcial - Tokyo 2020 Olympics bronze medalist in boxing
