= 1998 PBA All-Filipino Cup =

First conference of the 1998 PBA season

- Duration: February 1 - May 8, 1998
- TV partner(s): VTV (IBC)

Finals
- Champions: Alaska Milkmen
- Runners-up: San Miguel Beermen

Awards
- Best Player: Nelson Asaytono (San Miguel Beermen)
- Finals MVP: Kenneth Duremdes (Alaska Milkmen)

PBA All-Filipino Cup chronology
- < 1997 1999 >

PBA conference chronology
- < 1997 Governors' 1998 Commissioner's >

The 1998 Philippine Basketball Association (PBA) Centennial All-Filipino Cup, also known as the 1998 McDonald's-PBA All-Filipino Cup for sponsorship reasons, was the first conference of the 1998 PBA season. It started on February 1 and ended on May 8, 1998. The tournament is an All-Filipino format, which doesn't require an import or a pure-foreign player for each team.

== Format ==
The following format will be observed for the duration of the conference:

- The teams were divided into 2 groups.

Group A:

1. Alaska Milkmen
2. Gordon's Gin Boars
3. Formula Shell
4. San Miguel Beermen

Group B:

1. Mobiline Phone Pals
2. Sta. Lucia Realtors
3. Purefoods Carne Norte Beefies
4. Pop Cola 800s

- Teams in a group will play against each other once and against teams in the other group twice; 11 games per team; Teams are then seeded by basis on win–loss records. Ties are broken among point differentials of the tied teams. Standings will be determined in one league table; teams do not qualify by basis of groupings.
- The top six teams after the eliminations will advance to the semifinals.
- Semifinals will be two round robin affairs with the remaining teams. Results from the elimination round will be carried over. A playoff incentive for a finals berth will be given to the team that will win at least seven of their ten semifinal games.
- The top two teams (or the top team and the winner of the playoff incentive) will face each other in a best-of-seven championship series. The next two teams will qualify for a one-game playoff for third place.

== Elimination round ==
=== Team standings ===
Pos	Team	W	L	PCT	GB	Qualification
1	Alaska Milkmen	9	2	.818	—	Semifinal round
2	San Miguel Beermen	7	4	.636	2	Semifinal round
3	Sta. Lucia Realtors	5	6	.455	4	Semifinal round
4	Pop Cola 800s	5	6	.455	4	Semifinal round
5	Purefoods Carne Norte Beefies	5	6	.455	4	Semifinal round
6	Gordon's Gin Boars	5	6	.455	4	Semifinal round
7	Mobiline Phone Pals	4	7	.364	5	
8	Formula Shell Zoom Masters	4	7	.364	5	

== Semifinal round ==
=== Team standings ===
Overall standings
Pos	Team	W	L	PCT	GB	Qualification
1	San Miguel Beermen	15	6	.714	—	Advance to the Finals (Note: If a team outside the top two teams wins at least seven semifinal round games, then it and the second-placed team will playoff for the last Finals berth; otherwise, the top 2 teams qualify outright.)
2	Alaska Milkmen	14	7	.667	1	Guaranteed Finals berth playoff
3	Sta. Lucia Realtors	12	9	.571	3	Qualify to Finals berth playoff
4	Pop Cola 800s	10	11	.476	5	Proceed to third place playoff
5	Purefoods Carne Norte Beefies	8	13	.381	7	
6	Gordon's Gin Boars	7	14	.333	8	

Notes:

Semifinal round standings
Pos	Team	W	L	Qualification
1	San Miguel Beermen	8	2	
2	Sta. Lucia Realtors	7	3	Qualify to Finals berth playoff (Note: San Miguel qualified outright as #1 seeded team; Finals berth playoff: Alaska 77–69 Sta. Lucia)
3	Alaska Milkmen	5	5	
4	Pop Cola 800s	5	5	
5	Purefoods Carne Norte Beefies	3	7	
6	Gordon's Gin Boars	2	8	

== Finals berth playoff ==
VTV

April 19

Alaska Milkmen 77, Sta. Lucia Realtors 69

Cuneta Astrodome, Pasay

== Third place playoff ==
VTV

April 24

Sta. Lucia Realtors 60, Pop Cola 800s 66
Pop Cola wins third place trophy.

Araneta Coliseum, Quezon City

== Finals ==
VTV

April 24

San Miguel Beermen 76, Alaska Milkmen 69

Araneta Coliseum, Quezon City

VTV

April 26

San Miguel Beermen 64, Alaska Milkmen 80

Araneta Coliseum, Quezon City

VTV

April 28

San Miguel Beermen 84, Alaska Milkmen 89

Cebu Coliseum, Cebu City

VTV

May 1

San Miguel Beermen 97, Alaska Milkmen 90

Araneta Coliseum, Quezon City

VTV

May 3

San Miguel Beermen 78, Alaska Milkmen 73 (OT)

Cuneta Astrodome, Pasay

VTV

May 5

San Miguel Beermen 61, Alaska Milkmen 99

Cuneta Astrodome, Pasay

VTV

May 8

San Miguel Beermen 63, Alaska Milkmen 72
Alaska wins series, 4–3

Araneta Coliseum, Quezon City
