= 1998 PBA Commissioner's Cup =

Second conference of the 1998 PBA season

- Duration: May 22 – August 14, 1998
- TV partner(s): VTV (IBC)

Finals
- Champions: Alaska Milkmen
- Runners-up: San Miguel Beermen

Awards
- Best Player: Kenneth Duremdes (Alaska Milkmen)
- Best Import: Devin Davis (Alaska Milkmen)
- Finals MVP: Kenneth Duremdes (Alaska Milkmen)

PBA Commissioner's Cup chronology
- < 1997 1999 >

PBA conference chronology
- < 1998 All-Filipino 1998 Centennial >

The 1998 Philippine Basketball Association (PBA) Commissioner's Cup was the second conference of the 1998 PBA season. It started on May 22 and ended on August 14, 1998. The tournament is an import-laden format, which requires an import or a pure-foreign player for each team with a 6'8" height limit.

== Format ==
The following format will be observed for the duration of the conference

- The teams were divided into 2 groups.

Group A:

1. San Miguel Beermen
2. Ginebra Kings
3. Pop Cola 800s
4. Mobiline Phone Pals

Group B:

1. Formula Shell Zoom Masters
2. Alaska Milkmen
3. Purefoods TJ Hotdogs
4. Sta. Lucia Realtors

- Teams in a group will play against each other once and against teams in the other group twice; 11 games per team; Teams are then seeded by basis on win–loss records. Ties are broken among point differentials of the tied teams. Standings will be determined in one league table; teams do not qualify by basis of groupings.
- The top two teams will automatically qualify to the semifinals, while the next four teams will have a crossover quarterfinal round.
- Quarterfinals:
  - QF1: #3 vs. #6, with #3 having the twice-to-beat advantage
  - QF2: #4 vs. #5, with #4 having the twice-to-beat advantage
- Best-of-five semifinals:
  - SF1: QF1 vs. #4
  - SF2: QF2 vs. #3
- One-game third-place playoff: losers of the semifinals
- Best-of-seven finals: winners of the semifinals

== Elimination round ==
=== Team standings ===
| Pos | Team | W | L | PCT | GB | Qualification |
|---|---|---|---|---|---|---|
| 1 | Alaska Milkmen | 9 | 2 | .818 | — | Advance to semifinals |
| 2 | Pop Cola 800s | 6 | 5 | .545 (Note: Head-to-head record: Pop Cola 1–0 San Miguel) | 3 | Advance to semifinals |
| 3 | San Miguel Beermen | 6 | 5 | .545 | 3 | Twice-to-beat in the quarterfinals |
| 4 | Purefoods TJ Hotdogs | 5 | 6 | .455 (Note: Head-to-head differential: Purefoods 1.106, Shell 0.987, Mobiline 0.869) | 4 | Twice-to-beat in the quarterfinals |
| 5 | Formula Shell Zoom Masters | 5 | 6 | .455 | 4 | Twice-to-win in the quarterfinals |
| 6 | Mobiline Phone Pals | 5 | 6 | .455 | 4 | Twice-to-win in the quarterfinals |
| 7 | Ginebra San Miguel | 4 | 7 | .364 (Note: Head-to-head record: Ginebra 1–1 Sta. Lucia; Ginebra +2, Sta. Lucia −2) | 5 | |
| 8 | Sta. Lucia Realtors | 4 | 7 | .364 | 5 | |

Notes:

Alaska was unbeaten in their first eight outings before losing to Mobiline and San Miguel in succession. Pop Cola clinched the 2nd seed with a superior quotient over San Miguel Beermen.

== Bracket ==
Quarterfinals (Higher seeds twice-to-beat)
4 | Purefoods | 84 | 78
5 | Formula Shell | 96 | 87
3 | San Miguel | 95
6 | Mobiline | 89

Semifinals (Best-of-5)
1 | Alaska | 3
5 | Formula Shell | 2
2 | Pop Cola | 0
3 | San Miguel | 3

Finals (Best-of-7)
1 | Alaska | 4
3 | San Miguel | 2
Third place
2 | Pop Cola | 84
5 | Formula Shell | 80

== Quarterfinals ==
=== (3) San Miguel vs. (6) Mobiline ===
VTV

July 17

San Miguel Beermen 95, Mobiline Phone Pals 89
San Miguel wins series in one game

Araneta Coliseum, Quezon City

=== (4) Purefoods vs. (5) Shell ===
VTV

July 17

Purefoods TJ Hotdogs 84, Formula Shell 96

Araneta Coliseum, Quezon City

VTV

July 19

Purefoods TJ Hotdogs 78, Formula Shell 87
Shell wins series in two games

Cuneta Astrodome, Pasay

== Semifinals ==
=== (1) Alaska vs. (5) Shell ===
VTV

July 21

Alaska Milkmen 89, Formula Shell Zoom Masters 92

Cuneta Astrodome, Pasay

VTV

July 24

Alaska Milkmen 88, Formula Shell Zoom Masters 86

Araneta Coliseum, Quezon City

VTV

July 26

Alaska Milkmen 94, Formula Shell Zoom Masters 89

Cuneta Astrodome, Pasay

VTV

July 28

Alaska Milkmen 78, Formula Shell Zoom Masters 95

Cuneta Astrodome, Pasay

VTV

July 31

Alaska Milkmen 71, Formula Shell Zoom Masters 69
Alaska wins series, 3–2

Araneta Coliseum, Quezon City

=== (2) Pop Cola vs. (3) San Miguel ===
VTV

July 19

Pop Cola 800s 97, San Miguel Beermen 106

Cuneta Astrodome, Pasay

VTV

July 21

Pop Cola 800s 75, San Miguel Beermen 91

Cuneta Astrodome, Pasay

VTV

July 24

recap

Pop Cola 800s 79, San Miguel Beermen 92
San Miguel wins series, 3–0

Araneta Coliseum, Quezon City

== Third place playoff ==
VTV

August 2

Pop Cola 800s 84, Formula Shell Zoom Masters 80

Cuneta Astrodome, Pasay

== Finals ==
VTV

August 2

Alaska Milkmen 107, San Miguel Beermen 97 (OT)

Cuneta Astrodome, Pasay

VTV

August 4

Alaska Milkmen 106, San Miguel Beermen 89

Cuneta Astrodome, Pasay

VTV

August 7

Alaska Milkmen 81, San Miguel Beermen 88

Araneta Coliseum, Quezon City

VTV

August 9

Alaska Milkmen 83, San Miguel Beermen 92

Cuneta Astrodome, Pasay

VTV

August 11

Alaska Milkmen 92, San Miguel Beermen 84

Cuneta Astrodome, Pasay

VTV

August 14

Alaska Milkmen 85, San Miguel Beermen 74
Alaska wins series, 4–2

Araneta Coliseum, Quezon City
