= 1998 PBA Governors' Cup =

Fourth conference of the 1998 PBA season

- Duration: October 9 – December 9, 1998
- TV partner(s): VTV (IBC)

Finals
- Champions: Formula Shell Zoom Masters
- Runners-up: Mobiline Phone Pals

Awards
- Best Player: Jerry Codiñera (Purefoods TJ Hotdogs)
- Best Import: Silas Mills (Mobiline Phone Pals)
- Finals MVP: Benjie Paras (Formula Shell Zoom Masters)

PBA Governors' Cup chronology
- < 1997 1999 >

PBA conference chronology
- < 1998 Centennial 1999 All-Filipino >

The 1998 Philippine Basketball Association (PBA) Governors' Cup was the fourth conference of the 1998 PBA season. It started on October 9 and ended on December 9, 1998. The tournament is a two-import format, which requires each team to have two American reinforcements.

== Format ==
The following format will be observed for the duration of the conference:

- One-round robin eliminations; Teams' won-loss record in the Centennial Cup were carried over
- The top four teams after the eliminations will advance to the semifinals.
- Semifinals will be two round robin affairs with the standings back to zero.
- The top two teams will face each other in a best-of-seven championship series. The next two teams dispute the third-place trophy in a Best of three series.

== Elimination round ==
=== Team standings ===
Pos	Team	W	L	PCT	GB	Qualification
1	Mobiline Phone Pals	9	6	.600 (Note: Head-to-head quotient: Mobiline 1.068, Shell 1.027, San Miguel 0.953, Purefoods 0.952)	—	Semifinal round
2	Formula Shell Zoom Masters	9	6	.600	—	Semifinal round
3	San Miguel Beermen	9	6	.600	—	Semifinal round
4	Purefoods TJ Hotdogs	9	6	.600	—	Semifinal round
5	Pop Cola 800s	8	7	.533	1	
6	Ginebra San Miguel	7	8	.467	2	
7	Sta. Lucia Realtors	6	9	.400	3	
8	Alaska Milkmen	6	9	.400	3	

== Semifinal round ==
=== Team standings ===
Pos	Team	W	L	PCT	GB	Qualification
1	Mobiline Phone Pals	3	3	.500 (Note: Head-to-head quotient: Mobiline 1.045, Shell 1.006, San Miguel 0.985, Purefoods 0.963; first-seed playoff: Mobiline 84–80 Purefoods; second-seed playoff: Shell 87–83 San Miguel)	—	Advance to the finals
2	Formula Shell Super Unleaded	3	3	.500	—	Advance to the finals
3	San Miguel Beermen	3	3	.500	—	Proceed to third place playoffs
4	Purefoods TJ Hotdogs	3	3	.500	—	Proceed to third place playoffs

=== Results ===
VTV

November 8

Mobiline Phone Pals 89, Purefoods TJ Hotdogs 81

Cuneta Astrodome, Pasay

VTV

November 8

San Miguel Beermen 89, Formula Shell Super Unleaded 80

Cuneta Astrodome, Pasay

VTV

November 10

Purefoods TJ Hotdogs 90, Formula Shell Super Unleaded 89 (OT)

Cuneta Astrodome, Pasay

VTV

November 10

San Miguel Beermen 73, Mobiline Phone Pals 72

Cuneta Astrodome, Pasay

VTV

November 13

Formula Shell Super Unleaded 85, Mobiline Phone Pals 82

Araneta Coliseum, Quezon City

VTV

November 13

Purefoods TJ Hotdogs 89, San Miguel Beermen 80

Araneta Coliseum, Quezon City

VTV

November 15

Mobiline Phone Pals 80, San Miguel Beermen 75

Cuneta Astrodome, Pasay

VTV

November 15

Formula Shell Super Unleaded 112, Purefoods TJ Hotdogs 101

Cuneta Astrodome, Pasay

VTV

November 17

Mobiline Phone Pals 80, Formula Shell Super Unleaded 71

Cuneta Astrodome, Pasay

VTV

November 17

San Miguel Beermen 90, Purefoods TJ Hotdogs 89 (OT)

Cuneta Astrodome, Pasay

VTV

November 20

Formula Shell Super Unleaded 79, San Miguel Beermen 78

Araneta Coliseum, Quezon City

VTV

November 20

Purefoods TJ Hotdogs 87, Mobiline Phone Pals 80

Araneta Coliseum, Quezon City

== First seed playoff ==
VTV

November 22

Mobiline Phone Pals 84, Purefoods TJ Hotdogs 80

Cuneta Astrodome, Pasay

== Second seed playoff ==
VTV

November 22

Formula Shell Super Unleaded 87, San Miguel Beermen 83

Cuneta Astrodome, Pasay

== Third place playoffs ==
VTV

November 24

San Miguel Beermen 88, Purefoods TJ Hotdogs 94

Cuneta Astrodome, Pasay

VTV

November 27

San Miguel Beermen 101, Purefoods TJ Hotdogs 90

Araneta Coliseum, Quezon City

VTV

December 1

San Miguel Beermen 96, Purefoods TJ Hotdogs 99
Purefoods wins series, 2–1

Cuneta Astrodome, Pasay

== Finals ==
VTV

November 24

Mobiline Phone Pals 90, Formula Shell Super Unleaded 110

Cuneta Astrodome, Pasay

VTV

November 27

Mobiline Phone Pals 94, Formula Shell Super Unleaded 67

Araneta Coliseum, Quezon City

VTV

November 29

Mobiline Phone Pals 81, Formula Shell Super Unleaded 78

Araneta Coliseum, Quezon City

VTV

December 1

Mobiline Phone Pals 97, Formula Shell Super Unleaded 109

Cuneta Astrodome, Pasay

VTV

December 4

Mobiline Phone Pals 88, Formula Shell Super Unleaded 81

Cuneta Astrodome, Pasay

VTV

December 6

Mobiline Phone Pals 77, Formula Shell Super Unleaded 80

Araneta Coliseum, Quezon City

VTV

December 9

Mobiline Phone Pals 91, Formula Shell Super Unleaded 93
Formula Shell wins series, 4–3

Cuneta Astrodome, Pasay
