= 1998 PBA season =

24th PBA season

- Duration: February 1 – December 9, 1998
- Teams: 8
- TV partner: VTV (IBC)

1998 PBA Draft
- Top draft pick: Danny Ildefonso
- Picked by: Formula Shell Zoom Masters
- Season MVP: Kenneth Duremdes (Alaska Milkmen)
- All-Filipino Cup champions: Alaska Milkmen
- All-Filipino Cup runners-up: San Miguel Beermen
- Commissioner's Cup champions: Alaska Milkmen
- Commissioner's Cup runners-up: San Miguel Beermen
- Centennial Cup champions: Mobiline Phone Pals
- Centennial Cup runners-up: Formula Shell Super Unleaded
- Governors Cup champions: Formula Shell Super Unleaded
- Governors Cup runners-up: Mobiline Phone Pals

Seasons
- ← 1997 1999 →

The 1998 PBA season was the 24th season of the Philippine Basketball Association (PBA).

== Board of governors ==
=== Executive committee ===
- Emilio P. Bernardino, Jr. (Commissioner)
- Bernabe L. Navarro, Jr. (Chairman, representing Ginebra San Miguel)
- Reynaldo G. Gamboa (Vice-Chairman, representing Formula Shell Zoommasters)
- Manuel M. Encarnado (Treasurer, representing Sta. Lucia Realtors)

=== Teams ===
Team	Company	Governor	Alternate Governor
Alaska Milkmen	Alaska Milk Corporation	Wilfred Steven Uytengsu	Joaquin Trillo
Formula Shell Zoommasters	Pilipinas Shell Petroleum Corporation	Reynaldo Gamboa	
Gordon's Gin Boars/Ginebra San Miguel	La Tondeña Distillers, Inc.	Bernabe Navarro, Jr.	Roberto Eduardo
Mobiline Phone Pals	Lapanday Holdings Corporation	Luis P. Lorenzo Jr.	Ignatius F. Yenko
Pop Cola 800s	RFM Corporation	Elmer Yanga	Philip Prieto
Purefoods Tender Juicy Hotdogs	Purefoods Corporation	Teodoro Dimayuga	Eliezer Capacio
San Miguel Beermen	San Miguel Corporation	Nazario Avendaño	Jose Jara
Sta. Lucia Realtors	Sta. Lucia Realty and Development Corporation	Manuel Encarnado	

== Season highlights ==
- The PBA is in their toughest challenge with the formation of a new league called Metropolitan Basketball Association, backed by the giant network ABS-CBN, and is perceived to be a threat to the 24-year existence of the PBA.
- The Alaska Milkmen won two titles during the year while Formula Shell ended a six-year title-drought by winning the final conference of the season.
- For the third time in every four years, an All-pro squad to be known as Philippine Centennial Team will be given a task to win the basketball gold in the Asian Games, slated in December in Bangkok, Thailand. Alaska coach Tim Cone was chosen to handle to national team and pick the pro cagers to comprise the 12-man lineup. The Centennial team participated in the Jones Cup basketball tournament in Taipei and won their third championship.
- This is the only season that features four conferences with the addition of the Centennial Cup in celebration of the centennial anniversary of Philippine independence. The Philippine Centennial Team played as guest team in preparation for the 1998 Asian Games. The tournament was won by the Mobiline Phone Pals.
- The two-import format was revived during the Centennial Cup and the Governor's Cup.

== Opening ceremonies ==
The muses for the participating teams are as follows:

Team	Muse
Alaska Milkmen	Antoiniette Enciso and Maricris Fernandez
Formula Shell Zoom Masters	Janine Hermann
Gordon's Gin Boars	Michelle Aldana
Mobiline Phone Pals	Sunshine Cruz
Pop Cola 800s	Bea and Valentin of Eat Bulaga fame
Purefoods Carne Norte Beefies	Cris Villonco
San Miguel Beermen	G Toengi
Sta. Lucia Realtors	Sheryl Brahman

== Champions ==
- All-Filipino Cup: Alaska Milkmen
- Commissioner's Cup: Alaska Milkmen
- Centennial Cup: Mobiline Phone Pals
- Governor's Cup: Formula Shell Zoom Masters
- Team with best win–loss percentage: Alaska Milkmen (41–25, .621)
- Best Team of the Year: Alaska Milkmen (3rd)

== All-Filipino Cup ==
=== Elimination round ===
Pos	Team	W	L	PCT	GB	Qualification
1	Alaska Milkmen	9	2	.818	—	Semifinal round
2	San Miguel Beermen	7	4	.636	2	Semifinal round
3	Sta. Lucia Realtors	5	6	.455	4	Semifinal round
4	Pop Cola 800s	5	6	.455	4	Semifinal round
5	Purefoods Carne Norte Beefies	5	6	.455	4	Semifinal round
6	Gordon's Gin Boars	5	6	.455	4	Semifinal round
7	Mobiline Phone Pals	4	7	.364	5	
8	Formula Shell Zoom Masters	4	7	.364	5	

=== Semifinal round ===
Overall standings
Pos	Team	W	L	PCT	GB	Qualification
1	San Miguel Beermen	15	6	.714	—	Advance to the Finals (Note: If a team outside the top two teams wins at least seven semifinal round games, then it and the second-placed team will playoff for the last Finals berth; otherwise, the top 2 teams qualify outright.)
2	Alaska Milkmen	14	7	.667	1	Guaranteed Finals berth playoff
3	Sta. Lucia Realtors	12	9	.571	3	Qualify to Finals berth playoff
4	Pop Cola 800s	10	11	.476	5	Proceed to third place playoff
5	Purefoods Carne Norte Beefies	8	13	.381	7	
6	Gordon's Gin Boars	7	14	.333	8	

Notes:

Semifinal round standings
Pos	Team	W	L	Qualification
1	San Miguel Beermen	8	2	
2	Sta. Lucia Realtors	7	3	Qualify to Finals berth playoff (Note: San Miguel qualified outright as #1 seeded team; Finals berth playoff: Alaska 77–69 Sta. Lucia)
3	Alaska Milkmen	5	5	
4	Pop Cola 800s	5	5	
5	Purefoods Carne Norte Beefies	3	7	
6	Gordon's Gin Boars	2	8	

=== Third place playoff ===
Team 1	Score	Team 2
(3) Sta. Lucia Realtors	60–66	(4) Pop Cola 800s

=== Finals ===
Team 1	Series	Team 2	Game 1	Game 2	Game 3	Game 4	Game 5	Game 6	Game 7
(1) San Miguel Beermen	3–4	(2) Alaska Milkmen	76–69	64–80	84–89	97–90	78–73 (OT)	61–99	63–72

- Finals MVP: Kenneth Duremdes (Alaska)
- Best Player of the Conference: Nelson Asaytono (San Miguel)

== Commissioner's Cup ==
=== Elimination round ===
Pos	Team	W	L	PCT	GB	Qualification
1	Alaska Milkmen	9	2	.818	—	Advance to semifinals
2	Pop Cola 800s	6	5	.545 (Note: Head-to-head record: Pop Cola 1–0 San Miguel)	3	Advance to semifinals
3	San Miguel Beermen	6	5	.545	3	Twice-to-beat in the quarterfinals
4	Purefoods TJ Hotdogs	5	6	.455 (Note: Head-to-head differential: Purefoods 1.106, Shell 0.987, Mobiline 0.869)	4	Twice-to-beat in the quarterfinals
5	Formula Shell Zoom Masters	5	6	.455	4	Twice-to-win in the quarterfinals
6	Mobiline Phone Pals	5	6	.455	4	Twice-to-win in the quarterfinals
7	Ginebra San Miguel	4	7	.364 (Note: Head-to-head record: Ginebra 1–1 Sta. Lucia; Ginebra +2, Sta. Lucia −2)	5	
8	Sta. Lucia Realtors	4	7	.364	5	

=== Playoffs ===
Quarterfinals (Higher seeds twice-to-beat)
4	Purefoods	84	78
5	Formula Shell	96	87
3	San Miguel	95
6	Mobiline	89

Semifinals (Best-of-5)
1	Alaska	3
5	Formula Shell	2
2	Pop Cola	0
3	San Miguel	3

Finals (Best-of-7)
1	Alaska	4
3	San Miguel	2
Third place
2	Pop Cola	84
5	Formula Shell	80

==== Quarterfinals ====
Team 1	Series	Team 2	Game 1	Game 2
(3) San Miguel Beermen*	1–0	(6) Mobiline Phone Pals	95–89	—
(4) Purefoods TJ Hotdogs*	0–2	(5) Formula Shell Zoom Masters	84–96	78–87

*Team has twice-to-beat advantage. Team 1 only has to win once, while Team 2 has to win twice.

==== Semifinals ====
Team 1	Series	Team 2	Game 1	Game 2	Game 3	Game 4	Game 5
(1) Alaska Milkmen	3–2	(4) Formula Shell Zoom Masters	89–92	88–86	94–89	78–95	71–69
(2) Pop Cola 800s	0–3	(3) San Miguel Beermen	97–106	75–91	79–92	—	—

==== Third place playoff ====
Team 1	Score	Team 2
(2) Pop Cola 800s	84–80	(5) Formula Shell Zoom Masters

==== Finals ====
Team 1	Series	Team 2	Game 1	Game 2	Game 3	Game 4	Game 5	Game 6	Game 7
(1) Alaska Milkmen	4–2	(3) San Miguel Beermen	107–97 (OT)	106–89	81–88	83–92	92–84	85–74	—

- Finals MVP: Kenneth Duremdes (Alaska)
- Best Player of the Conference: Kenneth Duremdes (Alaska)
- Best Import of the Conference: Devin Davis (Alaska)

== Centennial Cup ==
=== Elimination round ===
Pos	Team	W	L	PCT	GB	Qualification
1	Ginebra San Miguel	6	2	.750	—	Semifinals
2	Mobiline Phone Pals	5	3	.625 (Note: Head-to-head quotient: Mobiline 1.142, Pop Cola 0.995, Shell 0.973, Purefoods 0.915)	1	Semifinals
3	Pop Cola 800s	5	3	.625	1	Semifinals
4	Formula Shell Zoom Masters	5	3	.625	1	Semifinals
5	Purefoods TJ Hotdogs	5	3	.625	1	
6	San Miguel Beermen	4	4	.500	2	
7	Alaska Milkmen	4	4	.500	2	
8	Philippine Centennial Team (G)	1	7	.125 (Note: Head-to-head record: Philippine Centennial Team 1–0 Sta. Lucia)	5	
9	Sta. Lucia Realtors	1	7	.125	5	

(G) Guests

=== Playoffs ===
Semifinals
1	Ginebra (OT)	75
4	Shell	78
2	Mobiline	74
3	Pop Cola	71

Finals
4	Shell (OT)	66
2	Mobiline	67
Battle-for-third
1	Ginebra	71
3	Pop Cola	85

== Governors' Cup ==
=== Elimination round ===
Pos	Team	W	L	PCT	GB	Qualification
1	Mobiline Phone Pals	9	6	.600 (Note: Head-to-head quotient: Mobiline 1.068, Shell 1.027, San Miguel 0.953, Purefoods 0.952)	—	Semifinal round
2	Formula Shell Zoom Masters	9	6	.600	—	Semifinal round
3	San Miguel Beermen	9	6	.600	—	Semifinal round
4	Purefoods TJ Hotdogs	9	6	.600	—	Semifinal round
5	Pop Cola 800s	8	7	.533	1	
6	Ginebra San Miguel	7	8	.467	2	
7	Sta. Lucia Realtors	6	9	.400	3	
8	Alaska Milkmen	6	9	.400	3	

=== Semifinal round ===
Pos	Team	W	L	PCT	GB	Qualification
1	Mobiline Phone Pals	3	3	.500 (Note: Head-to-head quotient: Mobiline 1.045, Shell 1.006, San Miguel 0.985, Purefoods 0.963; first-seed playoff: Mobiline 84–80 Purefoods; second-seed playoff: Shell 87–83 San Miguel)	—	Advance to the finals
2	Formula Shell Super Unleaded	3	3	.500	—	Advance to the finals
3	San Miguel Beermen	3	3	.500	—	Proceed to third place playoffs
4	Purefoods TJ Hotdogs	3	3	.500	—	Proceed to third place playoffs

=== Third place playoffs ===
Team 1	Series	Team 2	Game 1	Game 2	Game 3
(3) San Miguel Beermen	1–2	(4) Purefoods Tender Juicy Hotdogs	94–88	90–101	99–96

=== Finals ===
Team 1	Series	Team 2	Game 1	Game 2	Game 3	Game 4	Game 5	Game 6	Game 7
(1) Mobiline Phone Pals	3–4	(2) Formula Shell Super Unleaded	90–110	94–67	81–78	97–109	88–81	77–80	91–93

- Finals MVP: Benjie Paras (Shell)
- Best Player of the Conference: Jerry Codiñera (Purefoods)
- Best Import of the Conference: Silas Mills (Mobiline)

== Individual awards ==
- Most Valuable Player: Kenneth Duremdes (Alaska)
- Rookie of the Year: Danny Ildefonso (San Miguel)
- Sportsmanship Award: Freddie Abuda (San Miguel)
- Most Improved Player: Patrick Fran (Mobiline)
- Defensive Player of the Year: Chris Jackson (Formula Shell)
- Mythical Five
  - Johnny Abarrientos (Alaska)
  - Alvin Patrimonio (Purefoods)
  - Jerry Codiñera (Purefoods)
  - Jojo Lastimosa (Alaska)
  - Kenneth Duremdes (Alaska)
- Mythical Second Team
  - Rodericko "Olsen" Racela (San Miguel)
  - Mike Mustre (San Miguel)
  - Danny Ildefonso (San Miguel)
  - Nelson Asaytono (San Miguel)
  - Victor Pablo (Formula Shell)
- All Defensive Team
  - Chris Jackson (Formula Shell)
  - Freddie Abuda (San Miguel)
  - Jerry Codiñera (Purefoods)
  - Glenn Capacio (Mobiline)
  - Patrick Fran (Mobiline)

== Awards given by the PBA Press Corps ==
- Coach of the Year: Perry Ronquillo (Formula Shell)
- Mr. Quality Minutes: Rodney Santos (Alaska)
- Executive of the Year: Wilfred Uytengsu (Alaska)
- Comeback Player of the Year: Glenn Capacio (Mobiline)
- Referee of the Year: Franco Ilagan

== Board of Governors ==
- Emilio Bernardino (Commissioner)
- Ruben Cleofe (Secretary)
- Bernabe Navarro (Chairman, La Tondeña Distillers, Inc)
- Reynaldo Gamboa (Vice-Chairman, Pilipinas Shell Petroleum Corp.)
- Manuel Encarnado (Treasurer, Sta. Lucia Realty and Development, Inc)
- Wilfred Steven Uytengsu (Alaska Milk Corp.)
- Luis Lorenzo, Jr (Lapanday Holdings Corp.)
- Nazario Avendaño (San Miguel Corp.)
- Joaquin Trillo (Alaska Milk Corp.)
- Teodoro Dimayuga (Purefoods Corp.)
- Elmer Yanga (Republic Flour Mills Corp.)
- Roberto Eduardo (La Tondeña Distillers, Inc)
- Eliezer Capacio (Purefoods Corp.)
- Ignatius Yenko (Lapanday Holdings Corp.)

== Cumulative standings ==
Team	GP	W	L	PCT
Alaska Milkmen	66	41	25	.621
San Miguel Beermen	74	43	31	.581
Formula Shell Zoom Masters / Super Unleaded	61	31	30	.508
Pop Cola 800s	54	27	27	.500
Mobiline Phone Pals	54	27	27	.500
Purefoods Carne Norte Beefies / Tender Juicy Hotdogs	59	27	32	.458
Sta. Lucia Realtors	49	22	27	.449
Gordon's Gin Boars / Ginebra Kings	49	18	31	.368
Philippine Centennial Team	8	1	7	.125
