= 1997 Gordon's Gin Boars season =

- Head coach: Robert Jaworski
- General manager: Bernabe Navarro
- Owner: La Tondeña Distillers Inc.

All-Filipino Cup results
- Record: 16–12 (57.1%)
- Place: 2nd
- Playoff finish: Runner-up (lost to Purefoods 2–4)

Commissioner's Cup results
- Record: 16–9 (64%)
- Place: 1st
- Playoff finish: Champions (Defeated Alaska 2–4)

Governors Cup results
- Record: 7–8 (46.7%)
- Place: 6th
- Playoff finish: Quarterfinals (Lost to Sta. Lucia)

Gordon's Gin Boars seasons

The 1997 Gordon's Gin Boars season was the 19th season of the franchise in the Philippine Basketball Association (PBA).

== Draft picks ==
| Round | Pick | Player | College |
|---|---|---|---|
| 1 | 7 | Edward Naron | UV |
| 2 | 14 | Manuel Ortega | SLU |

== Season summary ==
=== Runner-up finish at All-Filipino Cup ===
Formerly Ginebra San Miguel, the La Tondeña ballclub will be known as Gordon's Gin Boars for the league's 23rd season. The Boars won their first three games in the All-Filipino Cup and were on top of the standings with six wins and one loss after the first round of eliminations, losing only to Alaska on March 2. The Boars finish with the best record of 10 wins and four losses, despite losing their last two assignments.

Gordon's Gin and traditional All-Filipino powerhouse Purefoods Corned Beef Cowboys easily made it to the finals and the two most popular teams will play against each other in the championship for only the second time in their history since they last played way back in the 1988 All-Filipino finals, won by Gordon's Gin (then Añejo Rum 65).

In the All-Filipino Cup finals series, the Boars lost to the more experience Cowboys in six games with Alvin Patrimonio playing superb for Purefoods in the title-clinching Game Six, scoring 40 points to lead his team to an 82-73 win.

=== Championship against Alaska Milk in Commissioner's Cup ===
Import Tyrone Hopkins led the Boars to the Commissioner's Cup semifinals with six wins and four losses and tied with three other teams at first place. Starting the semifinal round, the hardworking Hopkins was unexpectedly replaced by NBA veteran Chris King. Gordon's Gin and San Miguel Beermen battled it out for the second finals berth after the Alaska Milkmen advances first. On August 24, the Boars outlasted San Miguel in two overtimes, 106-100, for their third straight finals appearance.

In the best-of-seven title series against defending champion Alaska, the Boars went up 3-0 and on a verge of a four-game sweep but the Milkmen came back with victories in Games four and five. On September 7, Gordon's Gin ended a six-year title drought when they wrapped it up in Game six as they held Alaska to only five points in the third quarter to pull away with a 30-point lead, 79-49, going into the final 12 minutes. The Boars won in a convincing fashion, 105-79, for their first championship since they last won a crown in 1991. Boars' playing-coach Sonny Jaworski became the oldest active player to win a PBA title.

== Notable dates ==
February 23: Bal David dribbled past the midcourt line with three seconds to go and threw a prayer of a shot that went in as the buzzer sounded to lift Gordon's Gin to an 83-81 win over San Miguel Beermen for their second victory.

March 8: Gordon's Gin gifted playing-coach Sonny Jaworski on his 51st birthday with an 86-79 win over Purefoods in Iloilo City. The Boars raised their record to a league-leading 5-win, 1-loss slate. This is the first time in nine seasons that the two rivals and most popular ballclubs play in an out-of-town game.

August 24: In the knockout game for the right to play Alaska in the Commissioners Cup finals, Gordon's Gin were trailing by five points against the San Miguel Beermen in regulation, 75-80 with 51 seconds left, Boars import Chris King hit a three-pointer to cut the lead to two points and he issued a nice feed on Noli Locsin with nine seconds to go as Gordon's forces overtime at 80-all. The playoff match went into second overtime after Beermen Olsen Racela missed his second free throw and Marlou Aquino threw a long pass on Bal David for the go-ahead basket with 1.5 seconds remaining, forcing second extension at 94-all. San Miguel lost import Jeff Ward to injuries in the final five minutes as Gordon's Gin pulled away with a 106-100 victory.

October 10: New Boars import Leon Trimmingham debut with 34 points as Gordon's Gin nip Sta.Lucia Realtors, 97-96.

== Occurrences ==
An incident occurred during the April 29 semifinals game between Gordon's Gin and San Miguel Beermen which was won by the Boars, 98-94. Beerman Allan Caidic fell hard on the floor after an accidental collision between him and teammate Nelson Asaytono who leap in the air for a rebound, Boars' playing coach Sonny Jaworski was accused for his behavior when in full view of the thousands watching live at the Cuneta Astrodome and on live TV, the vintage camera captured Jaworski appearing to be arguing with game officials for Allan Caidic to be removed from the playing floor and went to the extent of making a "slit-the-throat" gesture, public response was immediate and callers swamped TV and radio stations to express their disgust, the controversy regarding the Big J's acts on the much-publicized accident has stirred a debate and mixed reactions from everybody putting in their worth of opinion.

Center Edward Joseph Feihl, who decided to sit out upon wanting to get a better contract during the off-season negotiations and has since refused to sign up with Gordon's Gin and opted to play in the PBL for AMA Computer College instead was traded to Purefoods on July 21 in exchange for Cris Bolado, who started playing for the Boars in the Governor's Cup.

Purnell Perry, a former Tanduay import in the PBL, played one game and the Boars lost to Mobiline, 117-136, in their first outing in the Governor's Cup on September 23. Perry was replaced by Dennis Edwards, another former Tanduay import in the PBL. Edwards led Gordon's Gin to three straight victories but when the much-talk about Leon Trimmingham, the Most Valuable Player in the Australian League and known as "Flight 44" became available, Edwards was sent home. Trimmingham's inconsistent performance in which the Boars won four of the nine games he played had convince the coaching staff to replaced him with Andy Bostick, a veteran of Venezuelan and Swedish league, with only one game left in their elimination round assignments.

== Roster ==
1997 Gordon's Gin Boars roster
Players

| Pos. | # | POB | Name | Height | Weight | DOB (YYYY–MM–DD) | From |
|---|---|---|---|---|---|---|---|
| G | 1 | (Philippines) | Bal David | 5 ft 9 in (1.75 m) | | | UST |
| F | 6 | (Philippines) | Noli Locsin | 6 ft 3 in (1.91 m) | | | De La Salle |
| G | 7 | (Philippines) | Robert Jaworski | 6 ft 0 in (1.83 m) | | | UE |
| G | 8 | (Philippines) | Teroy Albarillo | 5 ft 10 in (1.78 m) | | | Mindanao |
| F | 9 | (Philippines) | Macky De Joya | 6 ft 3 in (1.91 m) | | | San Beda |
| G/F | 11 | (Philippines) | Jayvee Gayoso | 6 ft 2 in (1.88 m) | | | Ateneo |
| G | 12 | (Philippines) | Vince Hizon | 6 ft 2 in (1.88 m) | | | Ateneo |
| C | 13 | (Philippines) | Marlou Aquino | 6 ft 9 in (2.06 m) | | | Adamson |
| G | 15 | (Philippines) | Michael Orquillas | 6 ft 2 in (1.88 m) | | | Cebu |
| F | 16 | (Philippines) | Benny Cheng | 6 ft 3 in (1.91 m) | | | Mapúa |
| F | 17 | (Philippines) | Terry Saldaña | 6 ft 3 in (1.91 m) | | | Letran |
| F/C | 18 | (Philippines) | Wilmer Ong | 6 ft 4 in (1.93 m) | | | USLS |
| C | 24 | (Philippines) | Cris Bolado | 6 ft 7 in (2.01 m) | | | National-U |
| G | 25 | (Philippines) | Pido Jarencio | 5 ft 10 in (1.78 m) | | | UST |
| G | 52 | (Philippines) | Robert Jaworski, Jr. | 6 ft 2 in (1.88 m) | | | Ateneo |

Coaches

Head coach

- (Philippines) Robert Jaworski

Assistant coach(es)

- (Philippines) Rino Salazar
- (Philippines) Philip Cezar

Legend

- (C) Team captain
- Injured

=== Recruited imports ===
| Tournament | Name | Number | Position | University/College | Duration |
|---|---|---|---|---|---|
| Commissioner's Cup | Tyrone Hopkins | 33 | Forward | UCO | June 13 to July 20 |
| Commissioner's Cup | Chris King | 44 | Forward | WFU | July 29 to September 7 |
| Governors' Cup | Purnell Perry | 2 | Forward | Voorhees College | September 23 (one game) |
| Governors' Cup | Dennis Edwards | 32 | Forward | Fort Hays State | September 26 to October 4 |
| Governors' Cup | Leon Trimmingham | 44 | Forward | Briar Cliff | October 10 to November 9 |
| Governors' Cup | Andy Bostick | | Forward | USC | November 14–18 |
