= 1997 PBA All-Filipino Cup =

First conference of the 1997 PBA season

- Duration: February 16 - May 25, 1997
- TV partner(s): VTV (IBC)

Finals
- Champions: Purefoods Corned Beef Cowboys
- Runners-up: Gordon's Gin Boars

Awards
- Best Player: Nelson Asaytono (San Miguel Beermen)
- Finals MVP: Alvin Patrimonio (Purefoods Corned Beef Cowboys)

PBA All-Filipino Cup chronology
- < 1996 1998 >

PBA conference chronology
- < 1996 Governors' 1997 Commissioner's >

The 1997 Philippine Basketball Association (PBA) All-Filipino Cup was the first conference of the 1997 PBA season. It started on February 16 and ended on May 25, 1997. The tournament is an All-Filipino format, which doesn't require an import or a pure-foreign player for each team.

== Format ==
The following format will be observed for the duration of the conference:

- Double-round robin eliminations; 14 games per team; Teams are then seeded by basis on win–loss records.
- The top five teams after the eliminations will advance to the semifinals.
- Semifinals will be two round robin affairs with the remaining five teams. Results from the eliminations will be carried over. A playoff incentive for a finals berth will be given to the team that will win at least five of their eight semifinal games.
- The top two teams (or the top team and the winner of the playoff incentive) will face each other in a best-of-seven championship series. The next two teams (or the loser of the playoff incentive and the fourth seeded team) dispute the third-place trophy in a one-game playoff.

== Elimination round ==
=== Team standings ===
Pos	Team	W	L	PCT	GB	Qualification
1	Gordon's Gin Boars	10	4	.714	—	Semifinal round
2	Purefoods Corned Beef Cowboys	8	6	.571	2	Semifinal round
3	Sta. Lucia Realtors	8	6	.571	2	Semifinal round
4	San Miguel Beermen	7	7	.500	3	Semifinal round
5	Mobiline Cellulars	7	7	.500	3	Semifinal round
6	Alaska Milkmen	6	8	.429	4	
7	Pop Cola Bottlers	5	9	.357	5	
8	Formula Shell Zoom Masters	5	9	.357	5	

== Semifinal round ==
=== Team standings ===
Overall standings
Pos	Team	W	L	PCT	GB	Qualification
1	Purefoods Corned Beef Cowboys	14	8	.636 (Note: Head-to-head record: Purefoods 3–1 Gordon's)	—	Advance to the Finals
2	Gordon's Gin Boars	14	8	.636	—	Advance to the Finals
3	Sta. Lucia Realtors	12	10	.545	2	Proceed to third place playoff
4	San Miguel Beermen	11	11	.500	3	Proceed to third place playoff
5	Mobiline Cellulars	9	13	.409	5	

Notes:

Semifinal round standings
Pos	Team	W	L
1	Purefoods Corned Beef Cowboys	6	2
2	San Miguel Beermen	4	4
3	Gordon's Gin Boars	4	4
4	Sta. Lucia Realtors	4	4
5	Mobiline Cellulars	2	6

== Third place playoff ==
VTV

May 13

Sta. Lucia Realtors 75, San Miguel Beermen 64

Cuneta Astrodome, Pasay

== Finals ==
VTV

May 13

Purefoods Corned Beef Cowboys 103, Gordon's Gin Boars 90

Cuneta Astrodome, Pasay

VTV

May 16

Purefoods Corned Beef Cowboys 91, Gordon's Gin Boars 73

Araneta Coliseum, Quezon City

VTV

May 18

Purefoods Corned Beef Cowboys 83, Gordon's Gin Boars 92

Cuneta Astrodome, Pasay

VTV

May 20

Purefoods Corned Beef Cowboys 94, Gordon's Gin Boars 84

Cuneta Astrodome, Pasay

VTV

May 23

Purefoods Corned Beef Cowboys 95, Gordon's Gin Boars 96

Araneta Coliseum, Quezon City

VTV

May 25

Purefoods Corned Beef Cowboys 82, Gordon's Gin Boars 73
Purefoods wins series, 4–2

Cuneta Astrodome, Pasay
