= 1997 Purefoods Carne Norte Beefies season =

- Head coach: Eric Altamirano
- General manager: Simon Mossesgeld
- Owner: Purefoods Corporation

All-Filipino Cup results
- Record: 18–10 (64.3%)
- Place: 1st
- Playoff finish: Champions (defeated Gordon's Gin 4–2)

Commissioner's Cup results
- Record: 3–7 (30%)
- Place: 8th
- Playoff finish: Eliminated

Governors Cup results
- Record: 13–12 (52%)
- Place: 2nd
- Playoff finish: Runner-up

Purefoods Carne Norte Beefies seasons

The 1997 Purefoods Carne Norte Beefies season was the 10th season of the franchise in the Philippine Basketball Association (PBA). The team was known as Purefoods Corned Beef Cowboys in the All-Filipino Cup and Commissioner's Cup.

== Draft pick ==
| Round | Pick | Player | College |
|---|---|---|---|
| 1 | 2 | Freche Ang | USLS |

== All-Filipino Cup title ==
The Purefoods Corned Beef Cowboys won the All-Filipino Cup title at the expense of Gordon's Gin Boars. Coach Eric Altamirano, who replaces Chot Reyes at the start of the season, became the youngest coach to steer his team to a PBA crown.

== Runner-up finish ==
In the Governors Cup, Purefoods advances into the championship series for the second time in the season by winning their best-of-five semifinal series against San Miguel Beermen, three games to two.

Going up against the defending champion Alaska Milkmen in the finals, the Carne Norte Beefies won Game one, but lost the last four games to settled for a second place finish in the season-ending conference.

== Occurrences ==
On July 21, pre-season acquisition Cris Bolado was traded to Gordon's Gin in exchange for Edward Joseph Feihl, who hold out of his contract with the Boars, Feihl began playing for Purefoods in the Governors Cup.

Two imports by the same name of Mike Jones played for Purefoods in the season, the first one was a third round pick of the Milwaukee Bucks in the 1988 NBA draft and who played in the Commissioners Cup, replacing their former import Ronnie Grandison, who return to the team he played with back in 1993 but couldn't lead the Cowboys to victories this time.

The other Mike Jones was from Rutgers University, who played in the Governors Cup finals and he started out with the Beefies in their fourth outing in the Governors Cup after temporary import Eric Brown fill in for Jones in the first three games.

== Award ==
- Alvin Patrimonio won his fourth Most Valuable Player (MVP) trophy, tying the record of Ramon Fernandez' four MVPs.

== Roster ==
1997 Purefoods Carne Norte Beefies roster
Players

| Pos. | # | POB | Name | Height | Weight | DOB (YYYY–MM–DD) | From |
|---|---|---|---|---|---|---|---|
| G/F | 1 | (Philippines) | Bong Ravena | 6 ft 1 in (1.85 m) | | | UE |
| G/F | 3 | (Philippines) | Elmer Lago | 6 ft 3 in (1.91 m) | | | De La Salle |
| F | 5 | (Philippines) | Edmund Reyes | 6 ft 3 in (1.91 m) | | | UST |
| F | 7 | (Philippines) | Rey Evangelista | 6 ft 3 in (1.91 m) | | | UST |
| G | 8 | (Philippines) | Genesis Sasuman | 5 ft 11 in (1.80 m) | | | Letran |
| G | 10 | (Philippines) | Dindo Pumaren | 5 ft 9 in (1.75 m) | | | De La Salle |
| C | 11 | (Philippines) | Edward Joseph Feihl | 7 ft 0 in (2.13 m) | | | Adamson |
| F | 16 | (Philippines) | Alvin Patrimonio | 6 ft 3 in (1.91 m) | | | Mapúa |
| G | 19 | (Philippines) | Freche Ang | 6 ft 2 in (1.88 m) | | | USLS |
| F | 23 | (Philippines) | Reuben Dela Rosa | 6 ft 3 in (1.91 m) |
| C | 24 | (Philippines) | Cris Bolado | 6 ft 7 in (2.01 m) | | | National-U |
| C | 44 | (Philippines) | Jerry Codinera | 6 ft 5 in (1.96 m) | | | UE |
| C | 55 | (Philippines) | Sonny Cabatu | 6 ft 5 in (1.96 m) | | | PSBA |
| F | 88 | (Philippines) | Cadel Mosqueda | 6 ft 4 in (1.93 m) | | | Arellano |

Coaches

Head coach

- (Philippines) Eric Altamirano

Assistant coach(es)

- (Philippines) Louie Alas
- (Philippines) Frankie Lim
- (Philippines) Ryan Gregorio

Legend

- (C) Team captain
- Injured

== Transactions ==
=== Trades ===
| Off season | To Alaska Rodney Santos; Bryant Punsalan | To Purefoods Cris Bolado |
| Off season | To Mobiline Glenn Capacio | To Purefoods Cadel Mosqueda |
| Off season | To San Miguel Olsen Racela | To Purefoods 1999 and 2000 draft picks |
| July 21, 1997 | To Gordon's Gin Cris Bolado | To Purefoods E.J. Feihl |

=== Additions ===
| Player | Signed | Former team |
| Elmer Lago | Off-season | Formula Shell |
| Genesis Sasuman | Off-season | Rookie Free agent |
| Sonny Cabatu | April 1997 | Ginebra (1995) |

=== Recruited imports ===
| Tournament | Name | Number | Position | University/College | Duration |
|---|---|---|---|---|---|
| Commissioner's Cup | Ronnie Grandison | 20 | Forward | UNO | June 13–29 |
| Commissioner's Cup | Mike Jones | 45 | Forward | Auburn | July 4–22 |
| Governors' Cup | Eric Brown | 12 | Guard/forward | | September 20–28 |
| Governors' Cup | Mike Jones | 24 | Guard/forward | Rutgers | October 3 to December 14 |
