= 1997 PBA Governors' Cup finals =

Basketball tournament

1997 PBA Governors Cup finals
Team	Coach	Wins
Alaska Milkmen	Tim Cone	4
Purefoods Carne Norte	Eric Altamirano	1
- Dates: December 5–14, 1997
- MVP: Johnny Abarrientos
- Television: VTV (IBC)
- Radio network: DWFM

PBA Governors Cup finals chronology
- < 1996 1998 >

PBA finals chronology
- < 1997 Commissioner's 1998 All-Filipino >

The 1997 PBA Governors Cup finals was the best-of-7 basketball championship series of the 1997 PBA Governors Cup, and the conclusion of the conference's playoffs. The Alaska Milkmen and Purefoods Carne Norte Beefies played for the 68th championship contested by the league.

The Alaska Milkmen won against Purefoods Carne Norte Beefies, 4 games to 1, to retain the Governor's Cup title for the 4th straight time.

Johnny Abarrientos won on his second back to back PBA finals MVP in Governors Cup finals.

== Qualification ==
Alaska		Purefoods
Finished 9–5 (.643), tied for 1st	Eliminations	Finished 8–6 (.571), 2nd
Qualified outright	Quarterfinals	defeated 5th seed Mobiline
defeated Sta. Lucia, 3–0	Best-of-5 semifinals	defeated San Miguel, 3–2

== Series scoring summary ==
Team	Game 1	Game 2	Game 3	Game 4	Game 5	Wins
Alaska	76	85	96	92	94	4
Purefoods	87	79	85	75	66	1
Venue	Araneta	Cuneta	Cuneta	Araneta	Cuneta

== Games summary ==
=== Game 1 ===
VTV

December 5

Alaska Milkmen 76, Purefoods Carne Norte Beefies 87
Pts: Sean Chambers 19	Pts: Mike Jones 33 Alvin Patrimonio 22
Purefoods leads series, 1–0

Araneta Coliseum, Quezon City

The Beefies ripped the game wide open with a 16–9 burst to take a commanding 53–41 spread. The Milkmen were able to bring down the lead to just four, 55–59. Import Mike Jones came back at the start of the fourth as the Beefies coasted to a 74–64 lead.

=== Game 2 ===
VTV

December 7

Alaska Milkmen 85, Purefoods Carne Norte Beefies 79
Pts: Sean Chambers 27	Pts: Mike Jones 32
Series tied, 1–1

Cuneta Astrodome, Pasay

The Milkmen kept their composure with every Beefies rally, Johnny Abarrientos had two key baskets in an 8–3 run that finally quelled another Beefies offensive.

=== Game 3 ===
VTV

December 9

Alaska Milkmen 96, Purefoods Carne Norte Beefies 85
Pts: Sean Chambers 26	Pts: Alvin Patrimonio 27
Alaska leads series, 2–1

Cuneta Astrodome, Pasay

The Beefies took a 64–61 advantage on an 18–6 run, but the Milkmen, behind Kenneth Duremdes and Sean Chambers took matters into their own hands in the remainder of the third period, giving Alaska a 73–65 lead going into the final quarter. The Beefies could not get closer than seven points at 84–91, entering the last two minutes.

=== Game 4 ===
VTV

December 12

Alaska Milkmen 92, Purefoods Carne Norte Beefies 75
Alaska leads series, 3–1

Araneta Coliseum, Quezon City

=== Game 5 ===
VTV

December 14

Alaska Milkmen 94, Purefoods Carne Norte Beefies 66
Scoring by quarter: 27–10, 24–17, 22–22, 21–17
Alaska wins series, 4–1

Cuneta Astrodome, Pasay

Alaska jumped to a 27–10 lead at the end of the first quarter. The Beefies played minus injured import Mike Jones and they could not sink a decent number of shots from the field, a 14–0 start by the Milkmen in the second period gave them a 31-point spread, 41–10, as Alaska positioned itself to an early victory party in the first half against a demoralized Beefies Then Johnny Abarrientos on his back to back second Finals MVP and Alaska captures a back to back 2 peat champs seventh title.

1997 PBA Governors Cup Champions

Alaska Milkmen
Seventh title

== Rosters ==
Alaska Milkmen roster
Players

Pos.	#	POB	Name	Height	Weight	DOB (YYYY–MM–DD)	From
G/F	6	(Philippines)	Jojo Lastimosa	6 ft 1 in (1.85 m)			USJ–R
G	7	(Philippines)	Roehl Gomez	6 ft 0 in (1.83 m)			Cebu
G/F	9	(Philippines)	Rodney Santos	6 ft 2 in (1.88 m)			San Sebastian
F/C	12	(Philippines)	Dickie Bachmann	6 ft 5 in (1.96 m)			De La Salle
G	14	(Philippines)	Johnny Abarrientos	5 ft 8 in (1.73 m)			Far Eastern
F	16	(Philippines)	Bong Hawkins	6 ft 3 in (1.91 m)			UPHSD
C	17	(Philippines)	Kevin Ramas	6 ft 4 in (1.93 m)			Mapúa
F	19	(Philippines)	Kenneth Duremdes	6 ft 3 in (1.91 m)			Adamson
G/F	20	(United States)	Sean Chambers (I)	6 ft 1 in (1.85 m)			Cal Poly
C	29	(Philippines)	Michael Otto	6 ft 6 in (1.98 m)			Far Eastern
C	32	(Philippines)	Poch Juinio	6 ft 5 in (1.96 m)			Philippines
C	41	(Philippines)	Jack Tanuan	6 ft 5 in (1.96 m)			Far Eastern
G/F	44	(Philippines)	Merwin Castelo	6 ft 2 in (1.88 m)			San Beda
C	51	(Philippines)	Bryant Punzalan	6 ft 6 in (1.98 m)			Far Eastern

Coaches

Head coach

- (United States) Tim Cone

Assistant coach(es)

- (Philippines) Joel Banal
- (Philippines) Aric del Rosario

Legend

- (C) Team captain
- (I) Import
- Injured

Purefoods Carne Norte Beefies roster
Players

Pos.	#	POB	Name	Height	Weight	DOB (YYYY–MM–DD)	From
G/F	1	(Philippines)	Bong Ravena	6 ft 1 in (1.85 m)			UE
G/F	3	(Philippines)	Elmer Lago	6 ft 3 in (1.91 m)			De La Salle
F	5	(Philippines)	Edmund Reyes	6 ft 3 in (1.91 m)			UST
F	7	(Philippines)	Rey Evangelista	6 ft 3 in (1.91 m)			UST
G	8	(Philippines)	Genesis Sasuman	5 ft 11 in (1.80 m)			Letran
G	10	(Philippines)	Dindo Pumaren	5 ft 9 in (1.75 m)			De La Salle
C	11	(Philippines)	Edward Joseph Feihl	7 ft 0 in (2.13 m)			Adamson
F	16	(Philippines)	Alvin Patrimonio	6 ft 3 in (1.91 m)			Mapúa
G	19	(Philippines)	Freche Ang	6 ft 2 in (1.88 m)			USLS
G/F	24	(United States)	Mike Jones (I)	6 ft 3 in (1.91 m)			Rutgers
C	44	(Philippines)	Jerry Codinera	6 ft 5 in (1.96 m)			UE
C	55	(Philippines)	Sonny Cabatu	6 ft 5 in (1.96 m)			PSBA
F	88	(Philippines)	Cadel Mosqueda	6 ft 4 in (1.93 m)			Arellano

Coaches

Head coach

- (Philippines) Eric Altamirano

Assistant coach(es)

- (Philippines) Louie Alas
- (Philippines) Frankie Lim
- (Philippines) Ryan Gregorio

Legend

- (C) Team captain
- (I) Import
- Injured

== Broadcast notes ==
Game	Play-by-play	Analyst
Game 1		
Game 2		
Game 3		
Game 4		
Game 5		
