= 1998 PBA All-Filipino Cup finals =

Basketball cup finals

Team	Coach	Wins
Alaska Milkmen	Tim Cone	4
San Miguel Beermen	Ron Jacobs	3
- Dates: April 24 – May 8, 1998
- Television: Vintage Sports (IBC)
- Radio network: DWFM

PBA All-Filipino Cup finals chronology
- < 1997 1999 >

PBA finals chronology
- < 1997 Governors 1998 Commissioner's >

The 1998 PBA All Filipino Cup finals was the best-of-7 basketball championship series of the 1998 PBA All-Filipino Cup, and the conclusion of the conference's playoffs. The Alaska Milkmen and San Miguel Beermen played for the 69th championship contested by the league as the country celebrates its centennial year. The champion for this finals series were awarded with two different trophies; the regular All-Filipino Cup trophy and the FVR Centennial Cup trophy.

The Alaska Milkmen regain the All-Filipino Cup crown with a 4–3 series victory against the San Miguel Beermen and repeated as back-to-back champions, winning their 8th PBA title.

Kenneth Duremdes won on his first finals MVP in All-Filipino Cup finals.

== Qualification ==
Alaska		San Miguel
Finished 9–2 (.818), 1st	Eliminations	Finished 7–4 (.636), 2nd
Finished 14–7 (.667), 2nd	Semifinals	Finished 15–6 (.714), 1st

== Series scoring summary ==
Team	Game 1	Game 2	Game 3	Game 4	Game 5	Game 6	Game 7	Wins
Alaska Milkmen	69	80	89	90	73	99	72	4
San Miguel Beermen	76	64	84	97	78	61	63	3
Venue	Araneta	Araneta	Cebu	Araneta	Cuneta	Cuneta	Araneta

== Games summary ==
=== Game 1 ===
VTV

April 24

Alaska Milkmen 69, San Miguel Beermen 76
San Miguel leads series, 1–0

Araneta Coliseum, Quezon City

The Beer took a 10-point lead in the first period, the Alaska Milkmen came back and narrowed the gap in the third period at 50–54. The San Miguel team recovered as they relied mostly on clutch baskets from their key players.

=== Game 2 ===
VTV

April 26

Alaska Milkmen 80, San Miguel Beermen 64
Series tied, 1–1

Araneta Coliseum, Quezon City

=== Game 3 ===
VTV

April 28

Alaska Milkmen 89, San Miguel Beermen 84
Alaska leads series, 2–1

Cebu Coliseum, Cebu City

San Miguel forward Art Dela Cruz was fined P12,000 when he threw the ball at Alaska center Poch Juinio and punch him in the face in a near scuffle, Juinio was fined P5,000 when he elbowed Dela Cruz in the neck, both were spared from suspension by the Commissioner's office

=== Game 4 ===
VTV

May 1

Alaska Milkmen 90, San Miguel Beermen 97
Series tied, 2–2

Araneta Coliseum, Quezon City

Alaska controlled the game for most of the way but the Beer rallied in the final minute, a triple by Mike Mustre gave San Miguel a 92–88 edge. Beer forward Nelson Asaytono poured in 40 points for the night.

=== Game 5 ===
VTV

May 3

Alaska Milkmen 73, San Miguel Beermen 78 (OT)
San Miguel leads series, 3–2

Cuneta Astrodome, Pasay

San Miguel's Nelson Asaytono scored 41 points and pumped in nine points in the extension period and made up for the scoreless performances of Mike Mustre and Allan Caidic plus the absence of Art Dela Cruz serving a one-game suspension for elbowing Poch Juinio in the face in Game four. Regulation ended at 66-all.

=== Game 6 ===
VTV

May 5

Alaska Milkmen 99, San Miguel Beermen 61
Series tied, 3–3

Cuneta Astrodome, Pasay

Alaska was up by 16 points, 28–12 at the end of the first quarter. The Milkmen raced to a 59–35 lead in the third period, Allan Caidic's triple keyed a 10–0 uprising by the Beer to cut the deficit to 14 points but Kenneth Duremdes, playing one of his best games, completed a steal off Allan Caidic and a feed to Bong Hawkins, who scored a buzzer-beating lay-up gave the Milkmen a 63–45 lead going into the final quarter. Alaska's 38-point winning margin was the most lopsided win in PBA finals history.

=== Game 7 ===
VTV

May 8

Alaska Milkmen 72, San Miguel Beermen 63
Alaska wins series, 4–3

Araneta Coliseum, Quezon City

The Milkmen got off to a sizzling start but the Beer worked their way back and close in, 31–32 at the break, behind the big triple by Nelson Asaytono. San Miguel last tasted the lead at 41–39. From a 43-all count, a 9–0 run by the Milkmen gave them a 52–43 lead going into the final quarter. Alaska was protecting a 10-point lead, 64–54, when the Beer battled back with seven straight points anchored on a three-point play from Nelson Asaytono and a jumper by rookie Danny Ildefonso to close the gap, 61–64, entering the final two minutes. Two crucial errors by Asaytono where he lost the ball twice and a clutch basket by Alaska's Johnny Abarrientos sealed the outcome at 70–63. Kenneth Duremdes won on his first Finals MVP and Alaska captures on his eighth championship title.

1998 PBA All-Filipino Cup Champions

Alaska Milkmen
Eight title

== Rosters ==
Alaska Milkmen roster
Players

Pos.	#	POB	Name	Height	Weight	DOB (YYYY–MM–DD)	From
G	5	(Philippines)	Gilbert Reyes	5 ft 8 in (1.73 m)			Ateneo
G/F	6	(Philippines)	Jojo Lastimosa	6 ft 1 in (1.85 m)			USJ–R
G	7	(Philippines)	Roehl Gomez	6 ft 0 in (1.83 m)			Cebu
G/F	9	(Philippines)	Rodney Santos	6 ft 2 in (1.88 m)			San Sebastian
C	12	(Philippines)	Dickie Bachmann	6 ft 5 in (1.96 m)			De La Salle
G	14	(Philippines)	Johnny Abarrientos	5 ft 8 in (1.73 m)			Far Eastern
F	15	(Philippines)	Albert David	6 ft 2 in (1.88 m)			Letran
F	16	(Philippines)	Bong Hawkins	6 ft 3 in (1.91 m)			UPHSD
C	17	(Philippines)	Kevin Ramas	6 ft 4 in (1.93 m)			Mapúa
F	19	(Philippines)	Kenneth Duremdes	6 ft 3 in (1.91 m)			Adamson
C	32	(Philippines)	Poch Juinio	6 ft 5 in (1.96 m)			Philippines

Coaches

Head coach

- (United States) Tim Cone

Assistant coach(es)

- (Philippines) Dickie Bachmann
- (Philippines) Gilbert Reyes

Legend

- (C) Team captain
- Injured

San Miguel Beermen roster
Players

Pos.	#	POB	Name	Height	Weight	DOB (YYYY–MM–DD)	From
G	4	(Philippines)	Siot Tanquingcen	5 ft 9 in (1.75 m)			UST
C	5	(Philippines)	Ronilo Padilla	6 ft 5 in (1.96 m)			Cebu
G	7	(Philippines)	Michael Mustre	6 ft 0 in (1.83 m)			Letran
F	8	(Philippines)	Allan Caidic	6 ft 2 in (1.88 m)			UE
C	10	(Philippines)	Danny Ildefonso	6 ft 6 in (1.98 m)			National-U
F	11	(Philippines)	Nelson Asaytono	6 ft 3 in (1.91 m)			Manila
F	12	(Philippines)	Yves Dignadice	6 ft 4 in (1.93 m)			STI WNU
F	14	(Philippines)	Joey Santamaria	6 ft 3 in (1.91 m)			De La Salle
G	15	(Philippines)	Edward Naron	6 ft 1 in (1.85 m)			Visayas
G	17	(Philippines)	Olsen Racela	5 ft 11 in (1.80 m)			Ateneo
F	18	(Philippines)	Art Dela Cruz	6 ft 2 in (1.88 m)			San Sebastian
F/C	25	(Philippines)	Freddie Abuda	6 ft 4 in (1.93 m)			Cebu
F	28	(Philippines)	Elpidio Villamin	6 ft 2 in (1.88 m)

Coaches

Head coach

- (United States) Ron Jacobs

Assistant coach(es)

- (Philippines) Jong Uichico

Legend

- (C) Team captain
- Injured

== Broadcast notes ==
Game	Play-by-play	Analysts	Courtside Reporters	Studio Host
Game 1	Noli Eala	Andy Jao		none
Game 2	Ed Picson	Quinito Henson		none
Game 3	Chino Trinidad	Yeng Guiao		none
Game 4	Noli Eala	Andy Jao		none
Game 5	Ed Picson	Quinito Henson		none
Game 6	Noli Eala	Andy Jao and Vince Hizon	Anthony Suntay and Mon Liboro	Chino Trinidad
Game 7	Noli Eala	Quinito Henson and Noy Castillo	Anthony Suntay, Chino Trinidad and Ronnie Magsanoc	none
