= 1997 Alaska Milkmen season =

- Head coach: Tim Cone
- General Manager: Joaqui Trillo
- Owner(s): Wilfred Steven Uytengsu

All-Filipino Cup results
- Record: 6–8 (42.9%)
- Place: 6th
- Playoff finish: Eliminated

Commissioner's Cup results
- Record: 13–11 (54.2%)
- Place: 2nd
- Playoff finish: Finals (lost to Gordon's Gin)

Governors Cup results
- Record: 16–6 (72.7%)
- Place: 1st
- Playoff finish: Champions (def. Purefoods)

Alaska Milkmen seasons

The 1997 Alaska Milkmen season was the 12th season of the franchise in the Philippine Basketball Association (PBA).

== Notable dates ==
February 16: The Grandslam champions opened their quest for another title-run by defeating a brand-new Mobiline Cellulars, 100–91, which had a new coach in Norman Black and 6-9 Fil-American rookie Andrew John Seigle, the number 1 overall pick, in the lone game of the PBA 23rd season opening.

April 15: In their last game in the eliminations of the All-Filipino Cup, the Milkmen beat Pop Cola, 93–85, for their 6th win against eight losses. Alaska missed a chance to forge a playoff with Mobiline, which pick up the fifth semifinals berth with a victory over league-leading Gordon's Gin in the second game, thus ending their streak of eight consecutive finals appearance.

== Runner-up finish ==
Former Añejo import Sylvester Gray, who last played in the PBA in 1990, came back to play for Alaska in the Commissioners Cup. The Milkmen were the last team to enter the semifinals with five wins and five losses. Gray decided to play elsewhere starting the semifinal round and was replaced by another returning import Kevin Holland, who played for Pepsi Mega three years ago. Alaska won six of their eight matches in the semifinals and overcame San Miguel's plus 12 quotient in an 87–71 victory over the Beermen on August 17 to automatically clinch the first finals berth with their 11th win in 18 outings, leaving sister teams Gordon's Gin and San Miguel to dispute the second finals seat. The Boars prevailed over the Beermen in two overtimes and went on to beat the Alaska Milkmen in the championship series, four games to two.

== 7th PBA title ==
Sean Chambers is on his ninth year with Alaska as they defend the only crown left from last season. On October 27, pre-season acquisitions Dwight Lago and Boyet Fernandez were traded to Pop Cola for Kenneth Duremdes and Edgar Tanuan. Duremdes' entry gave the Milkmen an additional firepower which they missed at the start of the season following Jeffrey Cariaso's departure to Mobiline. The Milkmen makes it to the Governors Cup semifinals outright with nine wins and five losses, they scored a 3–0 sweep over Sta.Lucia Realtors in the best-of-five semifinal series.

Alaska retains the Governors Cup title for the fourth straight time by winning against All-Filipino Cup champion Purefoods Carne Norte Beefies, four games to one. The finals victory gave the Milkmen their seventh league crown as they overtake the defunct Presto ballclub as the fourth winningest franchise.

== Roster ==
1997 Alaska Milkmen roster
Players

Pos.	#	POB	Name	Height	Weight	DOB (YYYY–MM–DD)	From
G/F	6	(Philippines)	Jojo Lastimosa	6 ft 1 in (1.85 m)			USJ–R
G	7	(Philippines)	Roehl Gomez	6 ft 0 in (1.83 m)			Cebu
G/F	9	(Philippines)	Rodney Santos	6 ft 2 in (1.88 m)			San Sebastian
F/C	12	(Philippines)	Dickie Bachmann	6 ft 5 in (1.96 m)			De La Salle
G	14	(Philippines)	Johnny Abarrientos	5 ft 8 in (1.73 m)			Far Eastern
F	16	(Philippines)	Bong Hawkins	6 ft 3 in (1.91 m)			UPHSD
C	17	(Philippines)	Kevin Ramas	6 ft 4 in (1.93 m)			Mapúa
F	19	(Philippines)	Kenneth Duremdes	6 ft 3 in (1.91 m)			Adamson
C	29	(Philippines)	Michael Otto	6 ft 6 in (1.98 m)			Far Eastern
C	32	(Philippines)	Poch Juinio	6 ft 5 in (1.96 m)			Philippines
C	41	(Philippines)	Jack Tanuan	6 ft 5 in (1.96 m)			Far Eastern
G/F	44	(Philippines)	Merwin Castelo	6 ft 2 in (1.88 m)			San Beda
C	51	(Philippines)	Bryant Punzalan	6 ft 6 in (1.98 m)			Far Eastern

Coaches

Head coach

- (United States) Tim Cone

Assistant coach(es)

- (Philippines) Joel Banal
- (Philippines) Aric del Rosario

Legend

- (C) Team captain
- Injured

== Transactions ==
=== Trades ===
Off-season	To Sta. Lucia Realtors Gilbert Reyes	To Alaska Milkmen Boyet Fernandez
Off-season	To Mobiline Phone Pals Jeffrey Cariaso	To Alaska Milkmen Dwight Lago
Off-season	To Purefoods Cris Bolado	To Alaska Milkmen Rodney Santos; Bryant Punsalan

=== Late-season trades ===
October 27	To Pop Cola Boyet Fernandez; Dwight Lago	To Alaska Milkmen Kenneth Duremdes; Jack Tanuan

=== Recruited imports ===
Tournament	Name	Number	Position	University/College	Duration
Commissioner's Cup	Sylvester Gray	23	Center-Forward	Memphis State	June 14 to July 20
Commissioner's Cup	Kevin Holland	5	Forward-Center	DePaul University	July 29 to September 7
Governors' Cup	Sean Chambers	20	Forward	Cal Poly San Luis Obispo	September 21 to December 14
