= 1997 PBA Commissioner's Cup finals =

Basketball tournament in the Philippines

Team	Coach	Wins
Gordon's Gin Boars	Robert Jaworski	4
Alaska Milkmen	Tim Cone	2
- Dates: August 26 – September 7, 1997
- MVP: Marlou Aquino
- Television: VTV (IBC)
- Radio network: DWFM

PBA Commissioner's Cup finals chronology
- < 1996 1998 >

PBA finals chronology
- < 1997 All-Filipino 1997 Governors' >

The 1997 PBA Commissioner's Cup finals was the best-of-7 series basketball championship of the 1997 PBA Commissioner's Cup, and the conclusion of the conference's playoffs. The Gordon's Gin Boars and Alaska Milkmen played for the 67th championship contested by the league.

Gordon's Gin Boars finally ended a six-year title drought, winning their finals series over Alaska Milkmen, 4 games to 2.

== Qualification ==
Gordon's Gin		Alaska
Finished 6–4 (.600), tied for 1st	Eliminations	Finished 5–5 (.500), 5th
Finished 11–7 (.611), tied for 1st	Semifinals	Finished 11–7 (.611), tied for 1st, and, +12 in overall point differential over San Miguel
Won against San Miguel, 106–100	Playoff	Finished 11–7 (.611), tied for 1st, and, +12 in overall point differential over San Miguel

== Series scoring summary ==
Team	Game 1	Game 2	Game 3	Game 4	Game 5	Game 6	Wins
Gordon's Gin	99	102	87	90	81	105	4
Alaska	89	96	86	108	86	79	2
Venue	Cuneta	Araneta	Cuneta	Cuneta	Araneta	Cuneta

== Games summary ==
=== Game 1 ===
VTV

August 26
7:30 pm

Gordon's Gin Boars 99, Alaska Milkmen 89
Scoring by quarter: 21–26, 24–18, 22–20, 32–25
Pts: Chris King 40; Rebs: Chris King 13; Asts: King 10	Pts: Johnny Abarrientos 23; Rebs: Kevin Holland 18; Asts: Abarrientos, Hawkins 5
Gordon's Gin leads series, 1–0

Cuneta Astrodome, Pasay

Chris King registered a triple-double of 40 points, 13 rebounds and 10 assists, as he figured in Gordon's key third quarter assault when they grabbed a 55–52 lead. Alaska had one last chance to stage a reversal late in the game but King took command, giving the Boars a 94–84 bubble with a minute to go.

=== Game 2 ===
VTV

August 29
7:00 pm

Gordon's Gin Boars 102, Alaska Milkmen 96
Gordon's Gin leads series, 2–0

Araneta Coliseum, Quezon City

Chris King, despite suffering a pulled left hamstring, never gave up, he hits the dagger three-pointer from a Marlou Aquino pass with 37.2 seconds left to give the Boars a four-point lead. Doctors later found out that King had a strained ligament and a partial tear on his left hamstring.

=== Game 3 ===
VTV

August 31
6:00 pm

Gordon's Gin Boars 87, Alaska Milkmen 86
Scoring by quarter: 12–18, 24–21, 26–17, 25–30
Pts: Pido Jarencio 23; Rebs: Terry Saldaña 12; Asts: Aquino 5	Pts: Kevin Holland 23; Rebs: Kevin Holland 14; Asts: Abarrientos 10
Gordon's Gin leads series, 3–0

Cuneta Astrodome, Pasay

The Boars pulled through a down-the-wire final minute with import Chris King's inside basket and Pido Jarencio's key triple as the Milkmen succumbed to turnovers and missed attempts in their last possessions. Jarencio waxes hot with seven triples, five in the final half, on a 7-of-8 shooting from the three-point range. Alaska had one last crack to win the game but Dwight Lago's jumper went all air as Gordon's takes a 3–0 lead.

=== Game 4 ===
VTV

September 2
7:00 pm

Gordon's Gin Boars 90, Alaska Milkmen 108
Scoring by quarter: 20–17, 17–28, 22–35, 31–26
Pts: Noli Locsin 18; Rebs: Chris King, Wilmer Ong 5 Asts: King 6	Pts: Johnny Abarrientos 24; Rebs: Kevin Holland 10; Asts: Abarrientos 4
Gordon's Gin leads series, 3–1

Cuneta Astrodome, Pasay

=== Game 5 ===
VTV

September 5
7:00 pm

Gordon's Gin Boars 81, Alaska Milkmen 86
Scoring by quarter: 19–13, 14–26, 29–27, 19–20
Pts: Chris King 19; Rebs: Marlou Aquino 11; Asts: King 10	Pts: Jojo Lastimosa 16; Rebs: Kevin Holland 15; Asts: Abarrientos 7
Gordon's Gin leads series, 3–2

Araneta Coliseum, Quezon City

=== Game 6 ===
VTV

September 7
6:00 pm

Gordon's Gin Boars 105, Alaska Milkmen 79
Pts: Chris King 24
Gordon's Gin wins series, 4–2

Cuneta Astrodome, Pasay

A decisive 33–5 run in the third quarter as the Boars' avalanche of points blew the game wide open. Gordon's steamrolled to a 30-point lead at 79–49, going into the fourth quarter, while limiting Alaska to an all-time lowest score of five points in a quarter.

1997 PBA Commissioner's Cup Champions

Gordon's Gin Boars
Fourth title

== Awards ==
- Finals MVP: Marlou Aquino (Gordon's Gin)
- Best Player of the Conference: Johnny Abarrientos (Alaska)

== Rosters ==
Gordon's Gin Boars roster
Players
Coaches

Pos.	#	POB	Name	Height	Weight	DOB (YYYY–MM–DD)	From
G	1	(Philippines)	Bal David	5 ft 9 in (1.75 m)	148 lb (67 kg)		UST
F	6	(Philippines)	Noli Locsin	6 ft 3 in (1.91 m)	250 lb (113 kg)		De La Salle
G	7	(Philippines)	Robert Jaworski	6 ft 0 in (1.83 m)	180 lb (82 kg)		UE
F	9	(Philippines)	Macky De Joya	6 ft 3 in (1.91 m)	190 lb (86 kg)		San Beda
G/F	11	(Philippines)	Jayvee Gayoso	6 ft 2 in (1.88 m)	190 lb (86 kg)		Ateneo
G	12	(Philippines)	Vince Hizon	6 ft 2 in (1.88 m)	180 lb (82 kg)		Ateneo
C	13	(Philippines)	Marlou Aquino	6 ft 9 in (2.06 m)	215 lb (98 kg)		Adamson
G	15	(Philippines)	Michael Orquillas	6 ft 2 in (1.88 m)	170 lb (77 kg)		Cebu
F	16	(Philippines)	Benny Cheng	6 ft 3 in (1.91 m)	200 lb (91 kg)		Mapúa
F	17	(Philippines)	Antero Saldaña	6 ft 3 in (1.91 m)	190 lb (86 kg)		Letran
F/C	18	(Philippines)	Wilmer Ong	6 ft 4 in (1.93 m)	245 lb (111 kg)		USLS
C	24	(Philippines)	Cris Bolado	6 ft 7 in (2.01 m)			National-U
G	25	(Philippines)	Pido Jarencio	5 ft 10 in (1.78 m)	170 lb (77 kg)		UST
F	44	(United States)	Chris King (I)	6 ft 7 in (2.01 m)	215 lb (98 kg)		Wake Forest
G	52	(Philippines)	Robert Jaworski, Jr.	6 ft 2 in (1.88 m)	180 lb (82 kg)		Ateneo

Head coach

- (Philippines) Robert Jaworski

Assistant coach(es)

- (Philippines) Rino Salazar
- (Philippines) Philip Cezar

Team manager

- (Philippines) Bernabe Navarro

Legend

- (C) Team captain
- (CI) Commissioner's Cup Import
- (GI) Governors' Cup Import
- (EI) EASL Import
- (DP) Unsigned draft pick
- (FA) Free agent
- (IN) Inactive
- (S) Suspended
- (R) Rookie
- (I) Import
- Injured

Alaska Milkmen roster
Players

Pos.	#	POB	Name	Height	Weight	DOB (YYYY–MM–DD)	From
F	5	(United States)	Kevin Holland (I)	6 ft 5 in (1.96 m)	219 lb (99 kg)		DePaul
G/F	6	(Philippines)	Jojo Lastimosa	6 ft 1 in (1.85 m)	180 lb (82 kg)		USJ–R
G	7	(Philippines)	Roehl Gomez	6 ft 0 in (1.83 m)	180 lb (82 kg)		Cebu
G/F	9	(Philippines)	Rodney Santos	6 ft 2 in (1.88 m)	175 lb (79 kg)		San Sebastian
G	10	(Philippines)	Boyet Fernandez	5 ft 8 in (1.73 m)	165 lb (75 kg)		San Agustin
F/C	12	(Philippines)	Dickie Bachmann	6 ft 5 in (1.96 m)	200 lb (91 kg)		De La Salle
G	14	(Philippines)	Johnny Abarrientos	5 ft 8 in (1.73 m)	150 lb (68 kg)		Far Eastern
G/F	15	(Philippines)	Dwight Lago	6 ft 3 in (1.91 m)	190 lb (86 kg)		De La Salle
F	16	(Philippines)	Bong Hawkins	6 ft 3 in (1.91 m)	220 lb (100 kg)		UPHSD
C	17	(Philippines)	Kevin Ramas	6 ft 4 in (1.93 m)	240 lb (109 kg)		Mapúa
C	29	(Philippines)	Michael Otto	6 ft 6 in (1.98 m)	210 lb (95 kg)		Far Eastern
C	32	(Philippines)	Poch Juinio	6 ft 5 in (1.96 m)	215 lb (98 kg)		Philippines
G/F	44	(Philippines)	Merwin Castelo	6 ft 2 in (1.88 m)	186 lb (84 kg)		San Beda
C	51	(Philippines)	Bryant Punzalan	6 ft 6 in (1.98 m)	210 lb (95 kg)		Far Eastern

Coaches

Head coach

- (United States) Tim Cone

Assistant coach(es)

- (Philippines) Joel Banal

Legend

- (C) Team captain
- (I) Import
- Injured

== Broadcast notes ==
Game	Play-by-play	Analyst	Courtside Reporter
Game 1	Noli Eala	Andy Jao	
Game 2	Ed Picson	Quinito Henson	Anthony Suntay and Butch Maniego
Game 3	Chino Trinidad	Andy Jao	Anthony Suntay and Butch Maniego
Game 4	Noli Eala	Quinito Henson	Anthony Suntay and Butch Maniego
Game 5	Chino Trinidad	Andy Jao	
Game 6	Ed Picson	Quinito Henson	Anthony Suntay, Butch Maniego and Randy Sacdalan
