= 1997 PBA All-Filipino Cup finals =

Basketball cup finals

Team	Coach	Wins
Purefoods Corned Beef Cowboys	Eric Altamirano	4
Gordon's Gin Boars	Robert Jaworski	2
- Dates: May 13–25, 1997
- Television: VTV (IBC)
- Radio network: DWFM

Referees
- Game 1: E. de Leon, F. Ilagan, O. Bernarte

PBA All-Filipino Cup finals chronology
- < 1996 1998 >

PBA finals chronology
- < 1996 Governors 1997 Commissioner's >

The 1997 PBA All-Filipino Cup finals was the best-of-7 basketball championship series of the 1997 PBA All-Filipino Cup, and the conclusion of the conference's playoffs. The Gordon's Gin Boars and Purefoods Corned Beef Cowboys played for the 66th championship contested by the league.

The Purefoods Corned Beef Cowboys won their 5th PBA championship with a 4–2 series win over the Gordon's Gin Boars.

Alvin Patrimonio won on his first finals MVP in All-Filipino Cup finals.

== Qualification ==
Purefoods		Gordon's Gin
Finished 8–6 (.571), tied for 2nd	Eliminations	Finished 10–4 (.714), 1st
Finished 14–8 (.636), 1st	Semifinals	Finished 14–8 (.636), 1st

== Series scoring summary ==
Team	Game 1	Game 2	Game 3	Game 4	Game 5	Game 6	Wins
Purefoods Corned Beef	103	91	83	94	95	82	4
Gordon's Gin	90	73	92	84	96	73	2
Venue	Cuneta	Araneta	Cuneta	Cuneta	Araneta	Cuneta

== Games summary ==
=== Game 1 ===
VTV

May 13
7:30 p.m.

Purefoods Corned Beef Cowboys 103, Gordon's Gin Boars 90
Scoring by quarter: 25–14, 22–14, 25–26, 31–36
Pts: Alvin Patrimonio 20	Pts: Noli Locsin 25
Purefoods leads series, 1–0

Cuneta Astrodome, Pasay
Referees: E. de Leon, F. Ilagan, O. Bernarte

The Cowboys took a whooping 47–28 lead at halftime with Bong Ravena scorching hot. The Boars trimmed down the deficit from as high as 22 in the first few minutes of the third quarter to just six points, 75–81, halfway through the fourth period. Gordon's had a mediocre 33% field goal in the first two quarters and committed 14 turnovers.

=== Game 2 ===
VTV

May 16
7:00 p.m.

Purefoods Corned Beef Cowboys 91, Gordon's Gin Boars 73
Scoring by quarter: 22–24, 14–14, 27–16, 28–19
Pts: Alvin Patrimonio 24	Pts: Marlou Aquino 19
Purefoods leads series, 2–0

Araneta Coliseum, Quezon City

=== Game 3 ===
VTV

May 18
6:00 p.m.

Purefoods Corned Beef Cowboys 83, Gordon's Gin Boars 92
Scoring by quarter: 14–29, 24–24, 24–14, 21–25
Pts: Bong Ravena 18	Pts: Marlou Aquino 25
Purefoods leads series, 2–1

Cuneta Astrodome, Pasay

=== Game 4 ===
VTV

May 20
7:00 p.m.

Purefoods Corned Beef Cowboys 94, Gordon's Gin Boars 84
Pts: Jerry Codiñera 22	Pts: Pido Jarencio 21
Purefoods leads series, 3–1

Cuneta Astrodome, Pasay

Gordon's embarked on a hot start with Pido Jarencio shutting the lights out with his near-flawless shooting from beyond the arc that gave the Boars a 10-point lead, 44–34, in the first 24 minutes of play.

The Cowboys' mental toughness took over in the second half and a mini-rally saw them trailed by only one point, 67–68, after three quarters. The Boars had the opportunity to level the series but a collapse in the fourth period allowed the Cowboys to respond with chilling efficiency.

=== Game 5 ===
VTV

May 23
7:00 p.m.

Purefoods Corned Beef Cowboys 95, Gordon's Gin Boars 96
Scoring by quarter: 24–26, 21–29, 27–24, 23–17
Pts: Alvin Patrimonio 25	Pts: Marlou Aquino 17
Purefoods leads series, 3–2

Araneta Coliseum, Quezon City

Vince Hizon came through with a huge defensive play in the closing seconds to preserved a Boars' victory.

=== Game 6 ===
VTV

May 25
6:00 p.m.

Purefoods Corned Beef Cowboys 82, Gordon's Gin Boars 73
Pts: Alvin Patrimonio 40
Purefoods wins series, 4–2

Cuneta Astrodome, Pasay

Going into the last quarter, the Cowboys trailed, 56–57. An 8–0 run from the start of the fourth period gave them a seven-point edge, 64–57. After Jayvee Gayoso hit a triple, a 7–1 blast by the Cowboys with Bong Ravena hitting his own three-pointer put Purefoods in front by 10 points, 71–61. Five straight points by the Boars close the gap to within, 66–71, nearing the final two minutes. Alvin Patrimonio's long jumper clinch the title for the Cowboys with a nine-point lead, 78–69. Patrimonio played for 45 minutes and scored 40 of his team's 82-point production, grabbed 11 rebounds and issued four assists. Alvin Patrimonio won on his first Finals MVP and Purefoods captures win on his fifth championship title.

1997 PBA All-Filipino Cup Champions

Purefoods Corned Beef Cowboys
Fifth title

== Rosters ==
Purefoods Corned Beef Cowboys roster
Players
Coaches

Pos.	#	POB	Name	Height	Weight	DOB (YYYY–MM–DD)	From
G/F	1	(Philippines)	Bong Ravena	6 ft 1 in (1.85 m)			UE
G/F	3	(Philippines)	Elmer Lago	6 ft 3 in (1.91 m)			De La Salle
F	5	(Philippines)	Edmund Reyes	6 ft 3 in (1.91 m)			UST
F	7	(Philippines)	Rey Evangelista	6 ft 3 in (1.91 m)			UST
G	8	(Philippines)	Genesis Sasuman	5 ft 11 in (1.80 m)			Letran
G	10	(Philippines)	Dindo Pumaren	5 ft 9 in (1.75 m)			De La Salle
F	16	(Philippines)	Alvin Patrimonio	6 ft 3 in (1.91 m)			Mapúa
G	19	(Philippines)	Freche Ang	6 ft 2 in (1.88 m)			USLS
C	24	(Philippines)	Cris Bolado	6 ft 7 in (2.01 m)			National-U
C	44	(Philippines)	Jerry Codinera	6 ft 5 in (1.96 m)			UE
C	55	(Philippines)	Sonny Cabatu	6 ft 5 in (1.96 m)			PSBA
F	88	(Philippines)	Cadel Mosqueda	6 ft 4 in (1.93 m)			Arellano

Head coach

- (Philippines) Eric Altamirano

Assistant coach(es)

- (Philippines) Louie Alas
- (Philippines) Frankie Lim
- (Philippines) Ryan Gregorio

Legend

- (C) Team captain
- (CI) Commissioner's Cup Import
- (GI) Governors' Cup Import
- (EI) EASL Import
- (DP) Unsigned draft pick
- (FA) Free agent
- (IN) Inactive
- (S) Suspended
- (R) Rookie
- Injured

Gordon's Gin Boars roster
Players
Coaches

Pos.	#	POB	Name	Height	Weight	DOB (YYYY–MM–DD)	From
G	1	(Philippines)	Bal David	5 ft 9 in (1.75 m)			UST
F	6	(Philippines)	Noli Locsin	6 ft 3 in (1.91 m)			De La Salle
G	7	(Philippines)	Robert Jaworski	6 ft 0 in (1.83 m)			UE
F	9	(Philippines)	Macky De Joya	6 ft 3 in (1.91 m)			San Beda
G/F	11	(Philippines)	Jayvee Gayoso	6 ft 2 in (1.88 m)			Ateneo
G	12	(Philippines)	Vince Hizon	6 ft 2 in (1.88 m)			Ateneo
C	13	(Philippines)	Marlou Aquino	6 ft 9 in (2.06 m)			Adamson
G	15	(Philippines)	Michael Orquillas	6 ft 2 in (1.88 m)			Cebu
F	16	(Philippines)	Benny Cheng	6 ft 3 in (1.91 m)			Mapúa
F	17	(Philippines)	Terry Saldaña	6 ft 3 in (1.91 m)			Letran
F/C	18	(Philippines)	Wilmer Ong	6 ft 4 in (1.93 m)			USLS
G	25	(Philippines)	Pido Jarencio	5 ft 10 in (1.78 m)			UST
G	52	(Philippines)	Robert Jaworski Jr.	6 ft 2 in (1.88 m)			Ateneo

Head coach

- (Philippines) Robert Jaworski

Assistant coach(es)

- (Philippines) Rino Salazar
- (Philippines) Philip Cezar

Legend

- (C) Team captain
- (CI) Commissioner's Cup Import
- (GI) Governors' Cup Import
- (EI) EASL Import
- (DP) Unsigned draft pick
- (FA) Free agent
- (IN) Inactive
- (S) Suspended
- (R) Rookie
- Injured

== Broadcast notes ==
Game	Play-by-play	Analyst	Courtside reporters
Game 1	Noli Eala	Andy Jao	Anthony Suntay and Butch Maniego
Game 2	Ed Picson	Quinito Henson	Anthony Suntay and Butch Maniego
Game 3	Chino Trinidad	Andy Jao	Anthony Suntay and Butch Maniego
Game 4	Ed Picson	Quinito Henson	Anthony Suntay and Butch Maniego
Game 5	Noli Eala	Andy Jao	Anthony Suntay and Butch Maniego
Game 6	Ed Picson	Quinito Henson	Anthony Suntay and Butch Maniego
