= 1997 Mobiline Phone Pals season =

1997 Mobiline Cellulars season
- Head coach: Norman Black; Tommy Manotoc (Governors' Cup)
- General Manager: Debbie Tan
- Owner(s): Pilipino Telephone Corporation

All-Filipino Cup results
- Record: 9–13 (40.9%)
- Place: 5th
- Playoff finish: Semifinals

Commissioner's Cup results
- Record: 4–6 (40%)
- Place: 6th
- Playoff finish: N/A

Governors' Cup results
- Record: 7–8 (46.7%)
- Place: 5th
- Playoff finish: Quarterfinals (lost to Purefoods in one game)

Mobiline Cellulars seasons

The 1997 Mobiline Phone Pals season was the 8th season of the franchise in the Philippine Basketball Association (PBA). The team was known as Mobiline Cellulars for the All-Filipino Cup and Commissioner's Cup.

== Draft picks ==
Round	Pick	Player	College
1	1	Andrew John Seigle	University of New Orleans
2	9	Antonio Espinosa, Jr	La Salle

== Notable date ==
February 23: Rookie Patrick Fran saved the day for the Cellulars in the 84–78 victory over Purefoods Corned Beef Cowboys which clawed back from a 20-point deficit to come close to within three with still 71 seconds remaining. Mobiline scored their first win of the season after losing to defending champion Alaska Milkmen on opening day a week ago.

== Occurrences ==
Former San Miguel coach Norman Black became the new head coach of Mobiline Cellulars, replacing Yeng Guiao at the start of the season. Tonichi Yturri and Matthew Gaston was hired as assistants.

Coach Black steered the team to a semifinal stint in the All-Filipino Cup after two years of being a doormat. After the Cellulars got eliminated in the Commissioner's Cup, Mobiline top honcho Choy Cojuangco and RFM chairman Joey Concepcion agreed on a player-coach trade during the first week of August. Norman Black coached his third team in 13 years with Pop Cola while Bottlers' team consultant Derrick Pumaren moved to the Cellulars.

Mobiline also acquired Ato Agustin from Pop Cola in exchange for Elpidio Villamin and Peter Martin. Starting the Governor's Cup, former Grand Slam coach Tommy Manotoc has taken Norman Black's place at the Mobiline bench with Derrick Pumaren as his co-mentor.

== Roster ==
1997 Mobiline Phone Pals roster
Players

Pos.	#	POB	Name	Height	Weight	DOB (YYYY–MM–DD)	From
G	3	(Philippines)	Tonyboy Espinosa	5 ft 7 in (1.70 m)			De La Salle
G	5	(Philippines)	Franz Pumaren	5 ft 7 in (1.70 m)			De La Salle
G	6	(Philippines)	Ato Agustin	5 ft 11 in (1.80 m)			Lyceum
F/C	7	(Philippines)	Richard del Rosario	6 ft 5 in (1.96 m)			De La Salle
G	8	(Philippines)	Al Solis	5 ft 11 in (1.80 m)			Visayas
F	10	(Philippines)	Alvin Teng	6 ft 4 in (1.93 m)			Arellano
G/F	12	(Philippines)	Glenn Capacio	6 ft 1 in (1.85 m)			Far Eastern
F	14	(Philippines)	Eric Reyes	6 ft 4 in (1.93 m)			Ateneo
G/F	16	(Philippines)	Lowell Briones	6 ft 3 in (1.91 m)			Visayas
G	17	(Philippines)	Patrick Fran	6 ft 0 in (1.83 m)			UST
F	19	(Philippines)	Joey Santamaria	6 ft 3 in (1.91 m)			De La Salle
F	22	(Philippines)	Jeffrey Cariaso	6 ft 2 in (1.88 m)			Sonoma State
C	52	(Philippines)	Andy Seigle	6 ft 9 in (2.06 m)			New Orleans

Coaches
Head coach
- (Philippines) Tommy Manotoc
- (Philippines) Derrick Pumaren (co-coach)
Assistant(s)
- (Philippines) Leo Isaac
- (Philippines) Bogs Adornado
- (Philippines) Bong Go

Legend
- (DP) Unsigned draft pick
- (FA) Free agent
- (S) Suspended
- (IN) Inactive
- Injured

== Transactions ==
=== Additions ===
Name	Deal Information	Former team
Lowell Briones	Pick by Purefoods in the Rookie draft and dealt to the Cellulars the following day	N/A
Patrick Fran	Rookie Free Agent	N/A
Franz Pumaren	Acquired from San Miguel	San Miguel Beermen
Eric Reyes	Acquired from Sunkist late last year in a trade with Eugene Quilban	Sunkist
Alvin Teng	Acquired from Sunkist late last year in a trade with Jack Tanuan	Sunkist

=== Trades ===
Off-season	To Purefoods Cadel Mosqueda	To Mobiline Glenn Capacio
Off-season	To Alaska Dwight Lago	To Mobiline Jeffrey Cariaso

=== Subtractions ===
Player	Signed	New team
Yoyoy Villamin	September 1997	Pop Cola
Peter Martin	September 1997	Pop Cola

=== Recruited imports ===
Tournament	Name	Number	Position	University/College	Duration
Commissioner's Cup	Isaiah Morris	35	Forward	University of Arkansas	June 15 to July 22
Governors' Cup	Artemus McClary	25	Guard/forward	Jacksonville University	September 23 to November 18
