= Jojo Lastimosa =

Filipino basketball player (born 1964)

TNT Tropang 5G
- Title: Team manager
- League: PBA

Personal information
- Born: March 10, 1964 (age 62) Cagayan de Oro
- Listed height: 6 ft 0 in (1.83 m)
- Listed weight: 182 lb (83 kg)

Career information
- College: Ateneo; USJ-R
- Playing career: 1988–2002
- Position: Shooting guard
- Coaching career: 2003–present

Career history

Playing
- 1988–1990: Purefoods Hotdogs
- 1991–1999: Alaska Milkmen
- 2000–2001: Pop Cola Panthers
- 2002: Alaska Aces

Coaching
- 2003–2013: Alaska Aces (assistant)
- 2014–2022: NLEX Road Warriors (assistant)
- 2017: Far Eastern University (assistant)
- 2018–2019: Bataan Defenders/Risers
- 2023–2024: TNT Tropang Giga

Career highlights
- As player: 10× PBA champion (1990 Third Conference, 1991 Third Conference, 1994 Governors', 1995 Governors', 1996 All-Filipino, 1996 Commissioner's, 1996 Governors', 1997 Governors', 1998 All-Filipino, 1998 Commissioner's); PBA Rookie of the Year (1988); 3× PBA Mythical First Team (1991, 1996, 1998); 4× PBA Mythical Second Team (1988, 1995, 1997, 1999); 8× PBA All-Star (1989 - 1994, 1996, 1998); PBA Finals MVP (1996 All Filipino Cup); Grand Slam champions (1996); 50 Greatest Players in PBA History (2000 selection); 2× PABL champion (1986 Invitational, 1987 International Invitational); PABL Most Valuable Player (1985 Invitational's); As head coach: PBA champion (2023 Governors'); As executive: 3× PBA champion (2023 Governors', 2024 Governors', 2024–25 Commissioner's); PBA Executive of the Year (2023); As assistant coach: 4× PBA champion (2003 Invitational, 2007 Fiesta, 2010 Fiesta, 2013 Commissioner's)
Medals
Men's basketball
Representing Philippines
Asian Games
Bronze medal – third place	1986 Seoul	Team
Bronze medal – third place	1998 Bangkok	Team
William Jones Cup
Gold medal – first place	1998 Taipei	Team

Isabelo "Jojo" Lastimosa Jr. (born March 10, 1964) is a Filipino professional basketball coach and former player. He is the team manager for the TNT Tropang 5G of the Philippine Basketball Association (PBA). He played in the PBA for the Purefoods Hotdogs, the Alaska Aces and the Pop Cola Panthers from 1988 to 2002. He was also a member of the Philippines' national basketball team during the 1980s and 1990s. He also played for the University of San Jose–Recoletos in Cebu City. He had also a stint with the Ateneo de Manila. He is known by the nicknames "Jolas", "Mr. Clutch", "The 4th Quarter Man", and "PBA Jordan" for his deadly perimeter shooting.

== College and amateur career ==
Lastimosa was one of the eight rookies of the Blue Eagles basketball team of the Ateneo de Manila University in the UAAP 1981-82 season, After a two-stint with Ateneo, Lastimosa transferred to the University of San Jose–Recoletos in Cebu City. In June 1983, he joined elder brother Danny in the power-laden Mama's Love basketball club team. It was there where he got his biggest break and exposure, his reentry in the Manila basketball scene via the premier amateur league (PABL). In this league, he was able to showcase his skills in basketball.

In a short span of time, Lastimosa won MVP honors while playing for Mama's Love in the first conference of the 1985 PABL season. The following year, he became teammates with Samboy Lim and they led the Lhuillier Jewelers to the championship of the PABL's first conference. He spent his last two years in the amateur league with the Jewelers of coach Yayoy Alcoseba although he was a borrowed player when RFM-Swifts won their first PABL title in the 1987 International Invitational Cup and was voted Most Outstanding Player of the tournament, besting former national teammate Alvin Patrimonio.

== Professional career ==
=== Purefoods ===
Lastimosa, along with Jerry Codiñera, were the two early entries to the pro league signed by newcomer Purefoods Hotdogs. He was already groomed to be a future superstar in the PBA. Jolas made such impact in his first season and was voted Rookie of the year. He won his first PBA title with the Hotdogs in the 1990 Third Conference. He was in trade with Boy Cabahug to Alaska beginning the 1991 season.

=== Alaska ===
Even he was a rising star at Purefoods, he has his best years were with the Alaska Milkmen. 9 of his 10 championships was won with Alaska, including a grand slam in 1996. One of his notable clutch shots was in Game 5 in the 1996 All-Filipino Cup finals.

=== Pop Cola ===
In the twilight of his career, Jolas moved to Pop Cola in the 2000 to 2001 season.

=== Return to Alaska ===
He returned to his old club Alaska Aces in his final year in 2002.

== Coaching career ==
=== Alaska ===
Lastimosa served as an assistant coach of the Aces under Tim Cone, Joel Banal and Luigi Trillo.

=== NLEX ===
After leaving Alaska, he served as an assistant coach for NLEX Road Warriors.

=== FEU Tamaraws ===
Lastimosa was reunited with his former Alaska teammate Johnny Abarrientos, when Lastimosa became an assistant coach for FEU Tamaraws.

=== TNT ===
While he was the manager of TNT, he was assigned as team's head coach and Slavoljub Gorunovic as active consultant, after Chot Reyes decided to focus on his commitment on the Philippine National Team. He was the second Tropang Giga head coach to have an active consultant after Bong Ravena. Lastimosa guided the team to win the 2023 Governors' Cup, their first ever Governors' Cup title since the founding of the franchise. Lastimosa also the first coach with active consultant to win a championship, and first to win a title on his first conference of coaching since former Joel Banal two decades ago, a former TNT coach that time. Reyes assumed the head coaching position in 2024, and Lastimosa focused as manager.

== Managerial career ==
Lastimosa was appointed as manager of TNT Tropang Giga in 2022.

== National team career ==
Lastimosa played for the Philippine national basketball team for two occasions of Asian Games, first in 1986 as an amateur player, and in 1998 as a professional. Both occasions won bronze medal.

In 1998 with the Philippine Centennial Team, he was notable for being benched in the majority of games, and got mad at Tim Cone, the coach of the team, and when Lastimosa inserted vs. Kazakhstan (second meeting against the team and the bronze medal game, he performed well that made the Philippines won bronze medal. The game was known as the "anger game". After that game, Lastimosa did not spoke to Cone after months.

== Coaching record ==
=== PBA ===
Team	Season	Conference	GP	W	L	PCT	Finish	PG	W	L	PCT	Results
TNT	2022–23	Governors' Cup	11	10	1	.909	1st	11	8	3	.727	Won PBA Championship
TNT	2023–24	Commissioner's Cup	11	5	6	.455	8th	1	0	1	.000	Lost in the Quarterfinals
Career Total			22	15	7	.681	Playoff Total	12	8	4	.667	1 championship

== Career highlights ==
=== PBA highlights ===
- Member of the 1996 Alaska Grand Slam Team
- 10-Time PBA Champion (1 With Purefoods, 9 with Alaska )
- Rookie of the Year in 1988
- 3-time Mythical First Team Selection (1991, 1996 and 1998)
- 4-time Mythical Second Team Selection (1988, 1995, 1997 and 1999)
- 10-time PBA All-Star
- 1992 PBA All Star Game MVP
- 1996 All Filipino Cup finals MVP
- PBA 2,000 assist club Member
- PBA 500 3-points club Member
- PBA 12,000 points club Member
- Member, PBA's 25 Greatest Players
- Member, PBA's 40 Greatest Players

=== Other highlights ===
- Member, 1986 Asian Games (Bronze Medal)
- Member, 1987 William Jones Cup
- Member, 1998 PBA Centennial Team
- Member, 1998 William Jones Cup (Champions)
- Member, 1998 Asian Games (Bronze Medal)
- Member, PBL's Top 20 Players of All-Time
