= Patrick Fran =

Filipino basketball player and coach (born 1973)

Personal information
- Born: April 13, 1973 (age 53)
- Listed height: 6 ft 0 in (1.83 m)
- Listed weight: 175 lb (79 kg)

Career information
- High school: Aquinas School (San Juan)
- College: UST
- PBA draft: 1996: 2nd round, 10th overall pick
- Drafted by: Purefoods Tender Juicy Hotdogs
- Playing career: 1996–2008
- Position: Point guard / shooting guard
- Number: 8, 17
- Coaching career: 2010–present

Career history

Playing
- 1996–2005; 2007–2008: Talk 'N Text Phone Pals
- 2005–2007: Air21 Express

Coaching
- 2010–2023: Meralco Bolts (assistant)
- 2016–2017: UST (assistant)
- 2021–2024: Meralco Bolts 3x3

Career highlights
- As player: PBA champion (2003 All-Filipino); PBA All-Defensive Team (1998, 2001, 2003); PBA Most Improved Player Award (1998); Samboy Lim PBA Sportsmanship Award (2003); UAAP champion (1993)

Patrick Roy Fran (born 1973) is a former Filipino basketball player and coach.

== Career ==
=== Playing ===
A homegrown from Ormoc, Fran played for UST Growling Tigers under Aric del Rosario, and won a championship with the team.

In 1996, Fran was drafted by Purefoods TJ Hotdogs, but was left unsigned and signed by Norman Black-coached Mobiline Phone Pals. While in the team, he won awards such as PBA All-Defensive Team in 1998, 2001, and 2003, PBA Most Improved Player Award in 1998, and Samboy Lim PBA Sportsmanship Award in 2003. He also won a championship in 2003, when the team was named Talk 'N Text.

In 2005, he was traded to Air21 Express. He returned to Talk 'N Text in 2007, and reached finals. He retired in 2008.

=== Coaching ===
Fran served as an assistant coach for Meralco Bolts since its inaugural season until 2023. He also served as an assistant coach in UST from 2016 until 2017.
