= 1997 Pop Cola Sizzlers season =

- Head coach: Derrick Pumaren (All-Filipino Cup); Arturo Valenzona (Commissioner's Cup); Norman Black (Governors' Cup)
- General Manager: Elmer Yanga
- Owner(s): RFM Corporation

All-Filipino Cup results
- Record: 5–9 (35.7%)
- Place: 7th
- Playoff finish: N/A

Commissioner's Cup results
- Record: 4–6 (40%)
- Place: 7th
- Playoff finish: N/A

Governor's Cup results
- Record: 5–9 (35.7%)
- Place: 7th
- Playoff finish: N/A

Pop Cola Sizzlers seasons

The 1997 Pop Cola Sizzlers season was the 8th season of the franchise in the Philippine Basketball Association (PBA). Known as the Pop Cola Bottlers in the All-Filipino and Commissioner's Cup.

== Draft picks ==
Round	Pick	Player	College
1	2	Nic Belasco	Notre Dame-Maryland
2	10	Romulo Marata	Adamson

== Notable dates ==
February 22: Pop Cola stuns defending champion Alaska Milkmen, 96–88 in Lipa City, Batangas, for their first win in two starts.

September 20: Vergel Meneses tallied a game-high 36 points, and import Byron Houston added 29 points with 19 rebounds as Pop Cola gave their new coach Norman Black his first win at the start of the Governor's Cup with a 108–92 victory over Purefoods in the out-of-town game in Tarlac State University Gym.

== Occurrences ==
Starting the Commissioners Cup, coach Derrick Pumaren was replaced by Arturo Valenzona, whose last coaching job in the PBA was nine years ago. Valenzona chooses Alfrancis Chua as his assistant coach while Pumaren remain as a team consultant.

After Pop Cola's failure to reach the semifinals for the fifth straight time, a player-coach trade took place between the two teams that didn't make past the eliminations in the Commissioner's Cup, the Bottlers acquired Norman Black from Mobiline as their head coach along with Elpidio Villamin and Peter Martin in exchange for guard Ato Agustin and their former coach Derrick Pumaren, who has now moved over to the Mobiline camp. Upon Norman Black's entry at Pop Cola, Alfrancis Chua was retain as assistant coach while Arturo Valenzona was relegated to team consultant.

== Roster ==
1997 Pop Cola Sizzlers roster
Players

Pos.	#	POB	Name	Height	Weight	DOB (YYYY–MM–DD)	From
G	3	(Philippines)	Eugene Quilban	5 ft 7 in (1.70 m)			San Sebastian
C	4	(Philippines)	Bonel Balingit	6 ft 9 in (2.06 m)			Visayas
G	9	(Philippines)	Boybits Victoria	5 ft 11 in (1.80 m)			San Beda
G	10	(Philippines)	Boyet Fernandez	5 ft 9 in (1.75 m)			San Agustin
F	11	(Philippines)	Marcelino Morelos	6 ft 2 in (1.88 m)			UE
G	12	(Philippines)	Romulo Marata	5 ft 11 in (1.80 m)			Adamson
F	13	(Philippines)	Elpidio Villamin	6 ft 2 in (1.88 m)
F	15	(Philippines)	Dwight Lago	6 ft 2 in (1.88 m)			De La Salle
F	18	(Philippines)	Vergel Meneses	6 ft 3 in (1.91 m)			José Rizal
F	21	(Philippines)	Peter Martin	6 ft 5 in (1.96 m)			San Sebastian
G	23	(Philippines)	Ricardo Marata	5 ft 9 in (1.75 m)			Southwestern-U
C	33	(United States)	Nic Belasco	6 ft 6 in (1.98 m)			Notre Dame (OH)
C	35	(Philippines)	Zaldy Realubit	6 ft 6 in (1.98 m)			USJ–R

Coaches

Head coach

- (United States) Norman Black

Assistant coach(es)

- (Philippines) Alfrancis Chua
- (Philippines) Arturo Valenzona

Legend

- (C) Team captain
- Injured

== Transactions ==
=== Additions ===
Name	Deal Information	Former team
Eugene Quilban	Acquired Mobiline late last year in a trade with Eric Reyes	Mobiline
Jack Tanuan	Acquired from Mobiline late last year in a trade with Alvin Teng	Mobiline

=== Trades ===
July 1997	To Mobiline #6 Ato Agustin	To Pop Cola Elpidio Villamin, Peter Martin
October 27, 1997	To Alaska #19 Kenneth Duremdes, #14 Jack Tanuan	To Pop Cola Boyet Fernandez, Dwight Lago

=== Recruited imports ===
Tournament	Name	Number	Position	University/College	Duration
Commissioner's Cup	Norris Coleman	8	Forward	Kansas State	June 13 to July 18
Governors' Cup	Byron Houston	8	Guard	Oklahoma State	September 20 to November 16
