= Dwight Lago =

Filipino retired basketball player

Personal information
- Born: July 4, 1968 (age 58)
- Listed height: 6 ft 3 in (1.91 m)
- Listed weight: 200 lb (91 kg)

Career information
- College: De La Salle
- PBA draft: 1993: 1st round, 4th overall pick
- Drafted by: Coney Island Ice Cream Stars
- Playing career: 1993–2002
- Position: Shooting guard / Small forward

Career history
- 1994–1994: Coney Island Ice Cream Stars
- 1994–1997: Mobiline Phone Pals
- 1997: Alaska Aces
- 1998–1999: Pop Cola 800s
- 1999–2002: San Miguel Beermen

Career highlights
- As player: 7× PBA champion (1993 All-Filipino, 1997 Governors', 1999 All-Commissioner's, 1999 Governors', 2000 All-Commissioner's, 2000 Governors', 2001 All-Filipino)

Dwight Lago, is a retired Filipino professional basketball player. He is the older brother of Elmer Lago.

== Playing career ==
A former La Salle Green Archer, Lago was drafted in 1993.

He played for Purefoods, Mobiline, Alaska, Pop Cola, and San Miguel in his PBA days.
