= 1996 PBA draft =

Player selection in Philippine basketball

General information
- Date(s): January 21, 1996
- Time: 2:00 pm
- Location: New World Makati Hotel, Makati
- Network(s): Vintage Sports on IBC

Overview
- League: Philippine Basketball Association
- First selection: Marlou Aquino (Ginebra)

The 1996 Philippine Basketball Association (PBA) rookie draft was an event at which teams drafted players from the amateur ranks. The annual rookie draft was held on January 21 at the New World Hotel in Makati. It was the last draft held in a hotel, as the draft venues were held inside shopping malls.

== Round 1 ==
Pick	Player	Country of origin*	PBA team	College
1	Marlou Aquino	Philippines	Ginebra San Miguel	Adamson
2	Rodney Santos	Philippines	Purefoods TJ Hotdogs	San Sebastian
3	Reuben Dela Rosa	Philippines	Purefoods TJ Hotdogs (from Shell)	Mapua
4	Arnold Gamboa	Philippines	Sta. Lucia Realtors	UE
5	Marcelino Morelos	Philippines	San Miguel Beermen	UE
6	Gilbert Castillo	Philippines	San Miguel Beermen	Letran
7	Peter Martin	Philippines	Pepsi Mega	San Sebastian
8	Joselito Rodriguez II	Philippines	Sunkist Orange Juicers	UNO-R Bacolod

== Round 2 ==
Pick	Player	Country of origin*	PBA team	College
9	Richard del Rosario	Philippines	Purefoods TJ Hotdogs	De La Salle
10	Patrick Fran	Philippines	Purefoods TJ Hotdogs	UST
11	Rommel Santos	United States	Formula Shell Zoom Masters	College of Staten Island
12	Leonard Reyes	United States	Purefoods TJ Hotdogs	Susquehanna University
13	Roel Bravo	Philippines	San Miguel Beermen	Manila

== Round 3 ==
Pick	Player	Country of origin*	PBA team	College
14	Gerardo Locsin	Philippines	Ginebra San Miguel	
15	Richard Superal	Philippines	Pepsi Mega	Saint La Salle

== Round 4 ==
Pick	Player	Country of origin*	PBA team	College
16	Ruel Culala	Philippines	Pepsi Mega	UE

== Round 5 ==
Pick	Player	Country of origin*	PBA team	College
17	Segundo "Bong" Dela Cruz III	Philippines	Pepsi Mega	Adamson

== Undrafted players ==
Draftee's name followed by college. All undrafted players become rookie free agents.

- Clifton Claybrook (Yakima Valley)
- Ariel Marundan (Trinity)
- Bethine "Siot" Tanquingcen (UST)
