= 1997 PBA Governors' Cup =

Third and last conference of the 1997 PBA season

- Duration: September 20 – December 14, 1997
- TV partner(s): Vintage Sports (IBC)

Finals
- Champions: Alaska Milkmen
- Runners-up: Purefoods Carne Norte Beefies

Awards
- Best Player: Alvin Patrimonio (Purefoods Carne Norte Beefies)
- Best Import: Larry Robinson (San Miguel Beermen)
- Finals MVP: Johnny Abarrientos (Alaska Milkmen)

PBA Governors' Cup chronology
- < 1996 1998 >

PBA conference chronology
- < 1997 Commissioner's 1998 All-Filipino >

The 1997 Philippine Basketball Association (PBA) Governors' Cup was the third and last conference of the 1997 PBA season. It started on September 20 with a provincial game in Tarlac City and ended on December 14, 1997. The tournament is an import-laden format, which requires an import or a pure-foreign player for each team.

== Format ==
The following format will be observed for the duration of the conference:

- Double-round robin eliminations; 14 games per team.
- The top two teams will automatically qualify to the semifinals while the next four teams will have a crossover quarterfinal round.
- Quarterfinals:
  - QF1: #3 vs. #6, with #3 having the twice-to-beat advantage
  - QF2: #4 vs. #5, with #4 having the twice-to-beat advantage
- Best-of-five semifinals:
  - SF1: QF1 vs. #4
  - SF2: QF2 vs. #3
- Third-place playoff: losers of the semifinals
- Best-of-seven finals: winners of the semifinals

== Elimination round ==
=== Team standings ===
Pos	Team	W	L	PCT	GB	Qualification
1	San Miguel Beermen	9	5	.643 (Note: Head-to-head quotient: San Miguel 1.027, Alaska 1.000, Sta. Lucia 0.975)	—	Advance to semifinals
2	Alaska Milkmen	9	5	.643	—	Advance to semifinals
3	Sta. Lucia Realtors	9	5	.643	—	Twice-to-beat in the quarterfinals
4	Purefoods Carne Norte Beefies	8	6	.571	1	Twice-to-beat in the quarterfinals
5	Mobiline Cellulars	7	7	.500 (Note: Head-to-head record: Mobiline 2–0 Gordon's)	2	Twice-to-win in the quarterfinals
6	Gordon's Gin Boars	7	7	.500	2	Twice-to-win in the quarterfinals
7	Pop Cola Sizzlers	5	9	.357	4	
8	Formula Shell Zoom Masters	2	12	.143	7	

== Bracket ==
Quarterfinals (Higher seeds twice-to-beat)
4	Purefoods	93
5	Mobiline	91
3	Sta. Lucia	102
6	Gordon's Gin	93

Semifinals (Best-of-5)
1	San Miguel	2
4	Purefoods	3
2	Alaska	3
3	Sta. Lucia	0

Finals (Best-of-7)
4	Purefoods	1
2	Alaska	4
Third place
1	San Miguel	99
3	Sta. Lucia	89

== Quarterfinals ==
=== (3) Sta. Lucia vs. (6) Gordon's Gin ===
VTV

November 18

Sta. Lucia Realtors 102, Gordon's Gin Boars 93
Sta. Lucia wins series in one game

Cuneta Astrodome, Pasay

=== (4) Purefoods vs. (5) Mobiline ===
VTV

November 18

recap

Purefoods Carne Norte Beefies 93, Mobiline Phone Pals 91
Purefoods wins series in one game

Cuneta Astrodome, Pasay

== Semifinals ==
=== (1) San Miguel vs. (4) Purefoods ===
VTV

November 23

San Miguel Beermen 96, Purefoods Carne Norte Beefies 82

Cuneta Astrodome, Pasay

VTV

November 25

San Miguel Beermen 73, Purefoods Carne Norte Beefies 80

Cuneta Astrodome, Pasay

VTV

November 28

San Miguel Beermen 91, Purefoods Carne Norte Beefies 89

Araneta Coliseum, Quezon City

VTV

November 30

San Miguel Beermen 84, Purefoods Carne Norte Beefies 94

Cuneta Astrodome, Pasay

VTV

December 2

recap

San Miguel Beermen 89, Purefoods Carne Norte Beefies 91
Purefoods wins series, 3–2

Cuneta Astrodome, Pasay

=== (2) Alaska vs. (3) Sta. Lucia ===
VTV

November 23

Alaska Milkmen 83, Sta. Lucia Realtors 69

Cuneta Astrodome, Pasay

VTV

November 25

Alaska Milkmen 107, Sta. Lucia Realtors 87

Cuneta Astrodome, Pasay

VTV

November 28

Alaska Milkmen 95, Sta. Lucia Realtors 80
Alaska wins series, 3–0

Araneta Coliseum, Quezon City

== Third place playoff ==
VTV

December 5

San Miguel Beermen 99, Sta. Lucia Realtors 89

Araneta Coliseum, Quezon City

== Finals ==
VTV

December 5

Alaska Milkmen 76, Purefoods Carne Norte Beefies 87

Araneta Coliseum, Quezon City

VTV

December 7

Alaska Milkmen 85, Purefoods Carne Norte Beefies 79

Cuneta Astrodome, Pasay

VTV

December 9

Alaska Milkmen 96, Purefoods Carne Norte Beefies 85

Cuneta Astrodome, Pasay

VTV

December 12

Alaska Milkmen 92, Purefoods Carne Norte Beefies 75

Araneta Coliseum, Quezon City

VTV

December 14

Alaska Milkmen 94, Purefoods Carne Norte Beefies 66
Alaska wins series, 4–1

Cuneta Astrodome, Pasay
