= 1997 PBA Commissioner's Cup =

Second conference of the 1997 PBA season

- Duration: June 13 – September 7, 1997
- TV partner(s): VTV (IBC)

Finals
- Champions: Gordon's Gin Boars
- Runners-up: Alaska Milkmen

Awards
- Best Player: Johnny Abarrientos (Alaska Milkmen)
- Best Import: Jeff Ward (San Miguel Beermen)
- Finals MVP: Marlou Aquino (Gordon's Gin Boars)

PBA Commissioner's Cup chronology
- < 1996 1998 >

PBA conference chronology
- < 1997 All-Filipino 1997 Governors' >

The 1997 Philippine Basketball Association (PBA) Commissioner's Cup was the second conference of the 1997 PBA season. It started on June 13 and ended on September 7, 1997. The tournament is an import-laden format, which requires an import or a pure-foreign player for each team with a 6'8" height limit.

== Format ==
The following format will be observed for the duration of the conference:

- The teams were divided into 2 groups.

Group A:

1. Formula Shell Zoom Masters
2. Mobiline Cellulars
3. Purefoods Corned Beef Cowboys
4. San Miguel Beermen

Group B:

1. Alaska Milkmen
2. Gordon's Gin Boars
3. Pop Cola Bottlers
4. Sta. Lucia Realtors

- Teams in a group will play against each other twice and against teams in the other group once; 10 games per team; Teams are then seeded by basis on win–loss records. Ties are broken among point differentials of the tied teams. Standings will be determined in one league table; teams do not qualify by basis of groupings.
- The top five teams after the eliminations will advance to the semifinals.
- Semifinals will be two round robin affairs with the remaining five teams. Results from the eliminations will be carried over. A playoff incentive for a finals berth will be given to the team that will win at least five of their eight semifinal games.
- The top two teams (or the top team and the winner of the playoff incentive) will face each other in a best-of-seven championship series. The next two teams (or the loser of the playoff incentive and the fourth seeded team) dispute the third-place trophy in a one-game playoff.

== Elimination round ==
=== Team standings ===
Pos	Team	W	L	PCT	GB	Qualification
1	Gordon's Gin Boars	6	4	.600	—	Semifinal round
2	San Miguel Beermen	6	4	.600	—	Semifinal round
3	Formula Shell Zoom Masters	6	4	.600	—	Semifinal round
4	Sta. Lucia Realtors	6	4	.600	—	Semifinal round
5	Alaska Milkmen	5	5	.500	1	Semifinal round
6	Mobiline Cellulars	4	6	.400	2	
7	Pop Cola Bottlers	4	6	.400	2	
8	Purefoods Corned Beef Cowboys	3	7	.300	3	

== Semifinal round ==
=== Team standings ===
Overall standings
Pos	Team	W	L	PCT	GB	Qualification
1	Alaska Milkmen	11	7	.611 (Note: Head-to-head quotient: Alaska 1.041. Gordon's 0.994, San Miguel 0.945)	—	Advance to the finals (Note: If a team outside the top two teams wins at least five semifinal round games, then it and the second-placed team will playoff for the last finals berth; otherwise, the top 2 teams qualify outright.)
2	Gordon's Gin Boars	11	7	.611	—	Guaranteed finals berth playoff
3	San Miguel Beermen	11	7	.611	—	Qualify to finals berth playoff
4	Sta. Lucia Realtors	8	10	.444 (Note: Head-to-head record: Sta. Lucia 2–1 Shell)	3	Proceed to third place playoff
5	Formula Shell Zoom Masters	8	10	.444	3	

Notes:

Semifinal round standings
Pos	Team	W	L	Qualification
1	Alaska Milkmen	6	2	
2	Gordon's Gin Boars	5	3	
3	San Miguel Beermen	5	3	Qualify to finals berth playoff (Note: Alaska qualified outright as #1 seeded team, Gordon's Gin guaranteed finals berth playoff as #2 seeded team; finals berth playoff: Gordon's Gin 106–100 San Miguel (2OT))
4	Sta. Lucia Realtors	2	6	
5	Formula Shell Zoom Masters	2	6	

== Finals berth playoff ==
VTV

August 24
6:00 pm

San Miguel Beermen 100, Gordon's Gin Boars 106 (2OT)
Scoring by quarter: 20–16, 14–22, 22–17, 24–25, Overtime: 14–14, 6–12
Pts: Jeff Ward 29; Rebs: Jeff Ward 14; Asts: Olsen Racela 7	Pts: Chris King 36; Rebs: Chris King 17; Asts: Chris King 6

Cuneta Astrodome, Pasay

== Third place playoff ==
VTV

August 26

San Miguel Beermen 96, Sta. Lucia Realtors 95

Cuneta Astrodome, Pasay

== Finals ==
VTV

August 26

Alaska Milkmen 89, Gordon's Gin Boars 99

Cuneta Astrodome, Pasay

VTV

August 29

Alaska Milkmen 96, Gordon's Gin Boars 102

Araneta Coliseum, Quezon City

VTV

August 31

Alaska Milkmen 86, Gordon's Gin Boars 87

Cuneta Astrodome, Pasay

VTV

September 2

Alaska Milkmen 108, Gordon's Gin Boars 90

Cuneta Astrodome, Pasay

VTV

September 5

Alaska Milkmen 86, Gordon's Gin Boars 81

Araneta Coliseum, Quezon City

VTV

September 7

Alaska Milkmen 79, Gordon's Gin Boars 105
Gordon's Gin wins series, 4–2

Cuneta Astrodome, Pasay
