= Bong Ravena =

Filipino basketball player and coach

TNT Tropang 5G
- Position: Assistant coach
- League: PBA

Personal information
- Born: May 22, 1970 (age 56)
- Listed height: 6 ft 2 in (1.88 m)
- Listed weight: 195 lb (88 kg)

Career information
- College: UE
- PBA draft: 1992: 1st Round round, 5th overall pick
- Drafted by: San Miguel Beermen
- Playing career: 1992–2005
- Coaching career: 2008–present

Career history

Playing
- 1992–1994: San Miguel Beermen
- 1994–1997: Purefoods Tender Juicy Hotdogs
- 1998–1999: Pasig-Rizal Pirates
- 2000–2005: Talk 'N Text Phone Pals

Coaching
- 2006–2018: Talk 'N Text/TNT (assistant)
- 2018–2020: TNT KaTropa / TNT Tropang Giga
- 2021–present: TNT Tropang Giga / TNT Tropang 5G (assistant)

Career highlights
- As player: 5× PBA champion (1992 All-Filipino, 1993 Governors', 1994 Commissioner's, 1997 All-Filipino, 2003 All-Filipino); 2× PBA All Star (1997, 1998); PBA Rookie of the Year (1992); PBA Most Improved Player (1997); PBA Mythical Second Team (1997); As assistant coach: 8× PBA champion (2009 Philippine, 2011 Philippine, 2011 Commissioner's, 2015 Commissioner's, 2021 Philippine, 2023 Governors', 2024 Governors', 2024–25 Commissioner's)

Ferdinand "Bong" Ravena II (born May 22, 1970) is a Filipino former professional basketball player and a current assistant coach for the TNT Tropang 5G of the Philippine Basketball Association (PBA). He was nicknamed the Raven during his playing days.

== Early life and college career ==
Ravena did not start playing basketball in his younger days. He was more often seen in the open fields playing football, and when he was indoors, he played volleyball. Once he picked basketball as his primary sport, it came to him quickly.

He played college basketball at University of the East under then coach Roel Nadurata and led the Red Warriors to a finals appearance in 1990 but fell to De La Salle Green Archers that were powered by Noli Locsin, Jun Limpot and Johnedel Cardel.

== Professional career ==
He was drafted 5th overall by San Miguel Beer in the 1992 PBA draft and earned a serious reputation as a deadeye gunner, while playing backup for Allan Caidic and Samboy Lim. His ability to work well off the ball was supposed to make him the quintessential decoy for the Beermen, who had a surplus of wing men on board.

By the end of his rookie season, he was chosen the PBA Rookie of the Year, but not without controversy. He was awarded the PBA Rookie of the Year despite posting meager numbers of 5.1 points, 1.3 rebounds, and 0.9 assists in 13.6 minutes.

In his sophomore season in 1993, he was relegated as a benchwarmer. By the end of the year, he found himself dealt to the Coney Island Ice Cream Stars in exchange for Kevin Ramas.

Coney Island renamed themselves as Purefoods Tender Juicy Hotdogs when he arrived in 1994. Upon his arrival, the team was loaded with young guns and veterans, yet he managed to earn more minutes than rookie Vince Hizon and defensive wiz Glenn Capacio. However, in 1995, when Purefoods sent Hizon to Ginebra San Miguel and the draft rights to second pick Rodney Santos to Alaska in 1996, and traded away Capacio to Mobiline in 1997, he found himself as the team's starting shooting guard.

It was then that he rose to prominence with the newly christened Purefoods Corned Beef Cowboys under the keen watch of newly appointed head coach Eric Altamirano. On a lineup that boasted Alvin Patrimonio, Jerry Codiñera, Dindo Pumaren, and Rey Evangelista, he became a vital piece of the puzzle in the team's campaign in the 1997 season. During the 1997 PBA All-Filipino Cup finals, he helped the Cowboys outlast the Ginebra Gin Kings in six games, to earn their first conference title in nearly three seasons.

His numbers rose the rest of the 1997 season, reaching career-high averages of 11.5 points, 4.1 rebounds, 2.4 assists, and 1.2 steals. He won two awards: The PBA Most Improved Player and a Mythical Second Team selection.

When a new professional league, Metropolitan Basketball Association, was formed in 1998, he bolted, along with other ex-PBA players, to be part of the Pasig Blue Pirates, where he played for two seasons.

When the team disbanded, he would return to the PBA in 2000 season, where he played several seasons with Mobiline/Talk 'N Text until 2005 and finish with a total of five PBA championships to his name before eventually retiring.

== Coaching career ==
Ravena served as one of the assistant coaches for the TNT KaTropa for 10 years. On September 21, 2018, he was named the head coach of the Katropa replacing former head coach Nash Racela.

== Coaching record ==
=== PBA ===
Season	Team	Conference										
Season	Team	Conference	GP	W	L	PCT	Finish	PG	W	L	PCT	Results
2017–18	TNT	Governors' Cup	5	2	3	.071	9th	—	—	—	—	Missed playoffs
2019	TNT	Philippine Cup	11	7	4	.636	4th	3	1	2	.333	Lost in the quarterfinals
2019	TNT	Commissioner's Cup	11	10	1	.909	1st	12	6	6	.500	Lost in the finals
2019	TNT	Governors' Cup	11	8	3	.727	3rd	6	3	3	.500	Lost in the semifinals
2020	TNT	Philippine Cup	11	7	4	.636	3rd	11	5	6	.455	Lost in the finals
Career Total			49	34	15	.693	Playoff Total	32	15	17	.468	0 championship

== Personal life ==
He is the father of three children: Japanese B.League player Kiefer Isaac and Ferdinand "Thirdy" III (who both played and graduated for the Ateneo Blue Eagles), and Danielle, a volleyball libero player who last played for the Akari Chargers in the Premier Volleyball League. His wife is the former UST Golden Tigress volleyball star and current volleyball analyst Mozzy Crisologo-Ravena.
