= Marlou Aquino =

Filipino basketball player (born 1972)

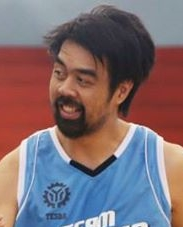
- Aquino in 2014

Personal information
- Born: October 7, 1972 (age 54) Santa Barbara, Pangasinan, Philippines
- Listed height: 6 ft 9 in (2.06 m)
- Listed weight: 240 lb (109 kg)

Career information
- College: Adamson
- PBA draft: 1996: 1st round1st overall
- Drafted by: Ginebra San Miguel
- Playing career: 1996–2020
- Position: Center
- Number: 13

Career history

Playing
- 1996–2000: Ginebra San Miguel / Gordon's Gin Boars / Barangay Ginebra Kings
- 2000–2010: Sta. Lucia Realtors
- 2010–2011: Meralco Bolts
- 2017–2018: Bulacan Kuyas
- 2018–2020: Bacoor City Strikers

Coaching
- 2021–2023: Bacoor City Strikers (assistant)
- 2024–2025: Pangasinan Heatwaves (consultant)

Career highlights
- 3× PBA champion (1997 Commissioner's, 2001 Governors', 2007–08 Philippine); PBA Defensive Player of the Year (1996); PBA Best Player of the Conference (1996 Governors'); PBA Finals Most Valuable Player (1997 Commissioner's); PBA Rookie of the Year (1996); 6× PBA All-Star (1996, 1997, 1998, 1999, 2000, 2003); 4× PBA All-Defensive Team (1996 - 1997, 2001, 2003; 2× PBA Mythical First Team (1996, 1997); 2× PBA Mythical Second Team (2000, 2003); 50 Greatest Players in PBA History (2015 selection); 5× PBL Champion (1992 Maharlika, 1995-96 Reinforced, 1995-96 All-Filipino, 1995-96 Danny Floro, 1996 Danny Floro); 5× PBL MVP (1992 Philippine, 1994 Import Reinforced, 1995 Import Reinforced, 1995 All-Filipino, 1995-96 Danny Floro Cup)

Marlou Bucao Aquino (born October 7, 1972) is a Filipino former professional basketball player who last served as the team consultant for the Pangasinan Heatwaves of the Maharlika Pilipinas Basketball League (MPBL). During his prime, he was known by fans as "The Skyscraper" and was, along with Edward Joseph Feihl, one-half of the so-called "Twin Towers" of the Ginebra San Miguel.

== Amateur career ==
Although born in the province of Pangasinan, Marlou Aquino made an impact as a player in Metro Manila as he played for the Adamson Falcons in the UAAP. Marlou played in the Philippine Basketball League for the Sta. Lucia Realtors (before it joined the PBA) and Stag Pale Pilsen, and won a record-setting four PBL Most Valuable Player of the Year awards. He was famous for his so-called "Kili-kili Shot" (a shot from under the opponent's armpit).

== Professional career ==
=== Philippine Basketball Association ===
In 1996, he made an impact in the Philippine basketball scene. He was drafted by the Ginebra San Miguel as the first overall pick. Expectations were high for Aquino and he became a starting player in his rookie year in a team headed by Robert Jaworski.

After showing strength in performance and leading the Kings to the All-Filipino finals, he earned the nickname, "The Skyscraper" and was tag as David and Goliath with his tandem point guard teammate Bal David. At the end of the season, Marlou Aquino became the first Ginebra player since Dondon Ampalayo in 1986 to win the Rookie of the Year award. He finished the season averaging 17.9 points, 9.0 rebounds, 1.8 assist, 2.8 blocks in 40.7 minutes per contest.

In his second season, he continued his role as one of the dominant centers in the league when he took the Gordon's Gin Boars to a championship, winning the 1997 PBA Commissioner's Cup. Aquino finished the season averaging 17.9 points, 9 rebounds, and 2.8 blocks in 64 games. After two solid seasons with the La Tondeña franchise, he was traded to the Sta. Lucia Realtors for Jun Limpot and Banjo Calpito before the 2000 season.

Aquino gained his second championship ring when the Realtors captured their first-ever PBA title in 2001 by beating the San Miguel Beermen in the Governor’s Cup.

In the 2007–2008 season, he claimed his third championship during the season's Philippine Cup when Sta. Lucia defeated the Purefoods Tender Juicy Giants in seven games.

In 2010, he was acquired by the Barako Bull Energy Boosters. However, when the Energy Boosters filed a leave of absence for the 2011 PBA Commissioner's Cup, he was shortly signed by the Meralco Bolts where he eventually ended his professional basketball career.

=== Maharlika Pilipinas Basketball League ===
Aquino returned to competitive basketball after leaving the PBA. He debuted for the Bulacan Kuyas at the Maharlika Pilipinas Basketball League in February 2018.

For the league's second conference Datu Cup which kicked off on June 12, 2018, Marlou transferred to the Bacoor City Strikers.

== PBA career statistics ==
Legend
GP	Games played	MPG	Minutes per game
FG%	Field-goal percentage	3P%	3-point field-goal percentage	FT%	Free-throw percentage
RPG	Rebounds per game	APG	Assists per game	SPG	Steals per game
BPG	Blocks per game	PPG	Points per game	**Bold**	Career high

=== Season-by-season averages ===
Year	Team	GP	MPG	FG%	3P%	FT%	RPG	APG	SPG	BPG	PPG
1996	Ginebra	64	40.7	.531	.200	**.624**	**9.0**	1.8	.3	**2.8**	**17.9**
1997	Gordon's Gin	**68**	42.2	**.594**	.000	.537	7.3	1.9	.2	2.6	17.1
1998	Gordon's Gin / Ginebra	32	28.1	.539	.200	.598	7.0	2.6	.3	1.5	14.7
1999	Barangay Ginebra	40	**42.3**	.502	.000	.618	7.6	2.6	.1	2.3	15.3
2000	Sta. Lucia	45	39.2	.525	.000	.548	7.4	1.6	**.4**	2.1	13.2
2001	Sta. Lucia	49	40.0	.511	**.333**	.561	6.9	2.0	.2	1.7	12.8
2002	Sta. Lucia	23	31.8	.498	.000	.553	6.8	1.7	.1	1.3	12.6
2003	Sta. Lucia	50	40.1	.521	.000	.512	8.3	**2.8**	.2	1.4	16.1
2004–05	Sta. Lucia	48	35.2	.471	.000	.496	5.7	2.4	.2	1.6	12.8
2005–06	Sta. Lucia	37	26.7	.459	—	.404	5.2	1.5	.1	1.6	8.2
2006–07	Sta. Lucia	46	21.2	.443	.000	.460	3.5	1.3	.1	1.7	7.5
2007–08	Sta. Lucia	46	18.8	.455	.286	.496	3.3	1.1	.1	1.1	6.8
2008–09	Sta. Lucia	43	18.2	.427	.000	.409	2.8	.8	.1	1.3	5.8
2009–10	Sta. Lucia	34	17.9	.467	**.333**	.429	2.4	.8	.1	.6	4.9
2010–11	Meralco	17	12.1	.386	—	.609	2.2	.6	.1	.4	3.4
Career		648	32.6	.509	.135	.539	6.0	1.8	.2	1.7	12.0

== Player profile ==
Aquino was a big star in the PBL for Nikon and Stag Pale Pilsen but was involved in a controversial scandal in terms of his academic status with Adamson University. After the scandal, he jumped to the pros and made big waves upon his arrival.

Aquino, known to his variety of hook shots and under-goal stab, remained a strong shot-blocker in the middle and rebounder throughout his career, making him one of the premiere centers in Philippine basketball. He was also a two-time Philippine national team member.

== Awards and records ==
- 3× PBA Champion (1997 Commissioner's Cup, 2001 Governors' Cup, 2007–08 Philippine Cup)
- PBA Defensive Player of the Year (1996)
- PBA Rookie of the Year 1996)
- PBA Mythical First Team 1996, 1997
- PBA Mythical Second Team 2000, 2003
- PBA All-Defensive Team 2003, 2001, 1997, 1996
- PBA Best Player of the Conference (1996 Governors' Cup)
- PBA Finals Most Valuable Player (1997 Commissioners' Cup)
- League leader in points (1996)
- League leader in free-throws made (1996)
- League leader in offensive rebounds (1996)
- League leader in blocks (1996, 1997, 2000, 2006–07)
- League leader in minutes played (1997)
- League leader in 2-pointers made (1997)
- Member of the 1994 and 1998 RP National Team
- 4× PBL Most Valuable Player
- Scored a career-high 38 points in 2007
- 40 Greatest Players in PBA History
