= 1997 Formula Shell Zoom Masters season =

- Head coach: Chito Narvasa

All-Filipino Cup results
- Record: 5–9 (35.7%)
- Place: 8th
- Playoff finish: N/A

Commissioner's Cup results
- Record: 8–10 (44.4%)
- Place: 5th
- Playoff finish: Semifinals

Governor's Cup results
- Record: 2–12 (14.3%)
- Place: 8th
- Playoff finish: N/A

Formula Shell Zoom Masters seasons

The 1997 Formula Shell Zoom Masters season was the 13th season of the franchise in the Philippine Basketball Association (PBA).

== Draft picks ==
Round	Pick	Player	College
1	4	Ernesto Ballesteros	UST
2	13	Jay Mendoza	Mapua

== Notable dates ==
March 7: After being held down to only 56 points in a loss to San Miguel Beermen in their previous game a week before, the Shell Zoom Masters scored their second win in five games in the All-Filipino Cup by beating Alaska Milkmen, 78-70.

June 13: Former San Miguel import John Best in his second stint in the PBA as Shell hired his services instead of last year's Commissioners Cup best import Kenny Redfield, who moved to Sta.Lucia, scored 41 points as the Zoom Masters defeated an off-form Purefoods Corned Beef Cowboys, 114-106, at the start of the Commissioners Cup.

July 20: Formula Shell earned a semifinal ticket in the Commissioners Cup with a 100-97 victory over Alaska Milkmen. Import John Best led five Shell double figure scorers with 36 points.

October 14: Import Dennis Williams scored 35 points as Shell finally break into win column in the Governors Cup after six losses with a 101-96 victory over Pop Cola. The Zoom Masters have lost eight straight since the Commissioners Cup semifinals.

== Occurrences ==
Seven-time best import Bobby Parks played in his 11th season in the PBA but was injured after seeing action for three games in the Governor's Cup, Parks was replaced by Dennis Williams.

== Roster ==
1997 Formula Shell Zoom Masters roster
Players

Pos.	#	POB	Name	Height	Weight	DOB (YYYY–MM–DD)	From
G	00	(United States)	Rommel Santos	5 ft 11 in (1.80 m)			Staten Island
G	5	(Philippines)	Ronnie Magsanoc	5 ft 9 in (1.75 m)			Philippines
G/F	6	(Philippines)	Johnedel Cardel	6 ft 0 in (1.83 m)			De La Salle
F	8	(Philippines)	Jojo Lim	6 ft 3 in (1.91 m)			Visayas
F	9	(Philippines)	Jay Mendoza	6 ft 4 in (1.93 m)			Mapúa
G	10	(Philippines)	Richie Ticzon	5 ft 8 in (1.73 m)			Ateneo
F	11	(Philippines)	Peter Naron	6 ft 3 in (1.91 m)			Visayas
F	12	(Philippines)	Porferio Marzan	6 ft 2 in (1.88 m)			Baguio
C	14	(Philippines)	Benjie Paras	6 ft 5 in (1.96 m)			Philippines
F	16	(Philippines)	Estong Ballesteros	6 ft 3 in (1.91 m)			UST
F/C	25	(Philippines)	Giovanni Pineda	6 ft 6 in (1.98 m)			Adamson
C	32	(Philippines)	Jolly Escobar	6 ft 5 in (1.96 m)			UE
F/C	33	(Philippines)	Victor Pablo	6 ft 4 in (1.93 m)			Far Eastern

Coaches
Head coach
- (Philippines) Chito Narvasa
Assistant(s)
- (Philippines) Perry Ronquillo

Legend
- (DP) Unsigned draft pick
- (FA) Free agent
- (S) Suspended
- Injured

== Transactions ==
=== Additions ===
Player	Signed	Former team
Johnedel Cardel	Off-season	Sta.Lucia
Giovanni Pineda	Off-season	Alaska

=== Recruited imports ===
Tournament	Name	Number	Position	University/College	Duration
Commissioner's Cup	John Best	4	Forward-Center	Tennessee Tech	June 13 to August 22
Governors' Cup	Bobby Parks	22	Forward	Memphis State	September 21-28
Governors' Cup	Dennis Williams	20	Guard-Forward	Georgia University	October 4 to November 14
