= Anthony Suntay =

Filipino sportscaster

- Born: Anthony R. Suntay
- Education: De La Salle University
- Years active: 1995–present
- Notable credit: 1997 Star Awards Best Sports Host, 1997 Catholic Mass Media Awardee, PPPC Interviewer of the year (1999 and 2000), 2005 Golden Dove Awards Best Radio Talk Host
- Title: Sportscaster, host
- Sports commentary career
- Sports: Basketball; Volleyball; Tennis

Anthony Suntay is a Filipino sports television personality, sportscaster and sports journalist.

== Career ==
A La Salle alumni from elementary (La Salle Green Hills), high school (De La Salle Zobel) to college (La Salle Manila), Suntay started his career as a courtside reporter at PBA on Vintage Sports in 1995. He was later promoted to play-by-play commentator when Vintage Sports was absorbed by Viva.

He continued his work as sports commentator in the PBA, and later he also served as a one-man voice of Japan B-League coverage in the Philippines.

Suntay also covers other sports such as volleyball, tennis, softball, pool, and bowling. He was dubbed as “The First and only Filipino International Sportscaster”.

== Awards ==
While at Vintage Sports, he received Star Awards' Best Sports Host and Catholic Mass Media Awardee both in 1997. He also won PPPC Interviewer of the Year for 1999 and 2000. In 2005, he won the Golden Dove awards as Best Radio Talk Host (Real Sports of Wave 89.1 Manila).

Suntay was given by De La Salle Alumni Association Sports Achievement Awardee in 2015.
