= 1997 San Miguel Beermen season =

- Head coach: Ron Jacobs
- Owner(s): San Miguel Corporation

All-Filipino Cup results
- Record: 11–12 (47.8%)
- Place: 4th
- Playoff finish: Semifinals

Commissioner's Cup results
- Record: 12–8 (60%)
- Place: 3rd
- Playoff finish: Semifinals

Governors Cup results
- Record: 12–8 (60%)
- Place: 3rd
- Playoff finish: Semifinals

San Miguel Beermen seasons

The 1997 San Miguel Beermen season was the 23rd season of the franchise in the Philippine Basketball Association (PBA).

== Draft pick ==
Round	Pick	Player	College
2	11	Ronilo Padilla	University of Cebu

== Notable dates ==
February 21: Former national team coach Ron Jacobs ushered his comeback in local basketball in the Beermen's 70-66 victory over Purefoods Corned Beef Cowboys, which also had a new head coach Eric Altamirano in both teams' first game of the season.

July 22: San Miguel completed the semifinal cast in the Commissioner's Cup with an 87-79 win over Mobiline Cellulars, who were hoping to gain a tie and a playoff.

September 21: Former Houston Rocket Larry Robinson debut with 33 points in San Miguel's 76-68 win over defending champion Alaska Milkmen.

== Awards ==
- Jeff Ward was voted the Commissioner's Cup Best Import.
- Larry Robinson was voted the Governor's Cup Best Import.

== Roster ==
1997 San Miguel Beermen roster
Players

Pos.	#	POB	Name	Height	Weight	DOB (YYYY–MM–DD)	From
G	4	(Philippines)	Siot Tanquingcen	5 ft 9 in (1.75 m)			UST
C	5	(Philippines)	Ronilo Padilla	6 ft 5 in (1.96 m)			Cebu
G/F	7	(Philippines)	Mike Mustre	6 ft 0 in (1.83 m)			Letran
F	8	(Philippines)	Allan Caidic	6 ft 2 in (1.88 m)			UE
F	9	(Philippines)	Samboy Lim	6 ft 0 in (1.83 m)			Letran
C	10	(Philippines)	Adriano Polistico	6 ft 7 in (2.01 m)			Letran
PF	11	(Philippines)	Nelson Asaytono	6 ft 3 in (1.91 m)			Manila
F/C	12	(Philippines)	Yves Dignadice	6 ft 4 in (1.93 m)			STI WNU
F/C	14	(Philippines)	Gilbert Castillo	6 ft 4 in (1.93 m)			Letran
G	15	(Philippines)	Edward Naron	6 ft 1 in (1.85 m)			Visayas
G	16	(Philippines)	Roel Bravo	5 ft 9 in (1.75 m)			Manila
G	17	(Philippines)	Olsen Racela	5 ft 11 in (1.80 m)			Ateneo
F	18	(Philippines)	Art Dela Cruz	6 ft 2 in (1.88 m)			San Sebastian
C	22	(Philippines)	Arnold Gamboa	6 ft 6 in (1.98 m)			Far Eastern
F	23	(Philippines)	Paul Alvarez	6 ft 1 in (1.85 m)			San Sebastian
F/C	25	(Philippines)	Freddie Abuda	6 ft 4 in (1.93 m)			Cebu

Coaches
Head coach
- (United States) Ron Jacobs
Assistant(s)
- (Philippines) Jong Uichico
- (Philippines) Filomeno Pumaren

Legend
- (DP) Unsigned draft pick
- (FA) Free agent
- (S) Suspended
- Injured

_{Team Manager: Nazario Avendaño}

== Transactions ==
=== Additions ===
Player	Signed	Former team
Arnold Gamboa	Off-season	Sta. Lucia Realtors
Edward Naron ^{Rookie pick by Gordon's Gin}	Off-season	N/A
Olsen Racela	Off-season	Purefoods
Siot Tanquingcen	Off-season	Sunkist

=== Recruited imports ===
Tournament	Name	Number	Position	University/College	Duration
Commissioner's Cup	Jeff Ward	21	Forward	Tiffin University	June 14 to August 26
Governors' Cup	Larry Robinson	20	Guard	Centenary College	September 21 to December 5
