= Terry Saldaña =

Filipino basketball player (1958–2023)

Personal information
- Born: November 17, 1958
- Died: February 1, 2023 (aged 64)
- Listed height: 6 ft 3 in (1.91 m)
- Listed weight: 190 lb (86 kg)

Career information
- High school: Letran (Manila)
- College: UST
- Playing career: 1982–2000
- Position: Power forward / center
- Number: 13, 17

Career history
- 1982–1983: Toyota Super Corollas
- 1983–1987: Gilbeys Gin/Ginebra San Miguel
- 1988: Alaska Air Force
- 1990–1993: Pop Cola/Diet Sarsi/Swift
- 1994–1996: Shell Rimula X/Formula Shell
- 1997–1998: Gordon's Gin Boars
- 1999: Batangas Blades
- 2000: Batang Red Bull Energizers

Career highlights
- 6× PBA champion (1982 Reinforced Filipino, 1982 Open, 1986 Reinforced, 1992 Third, 1993 Commissioner's, 1997 Commissioner's); PBA Most Improved Player (1983)

Antero Saldaña (November 17, 1958 – February 1, 2023) was a Filipino professional basketball player who played his entire career in the Philippine Basketball Association (PBA).

== Player profile ==
Coming straight from the MICAA, Saldaña was signed to a rookie contract by Toyota in 1982. He would have become the PBA Rookie of the Year awardee in 1982 had he not figured in a brawl against the visiting South Korean national team (led by Lee Chung-hee) in the 1982 PBA Invitationals. Although he was leading the rookie stats race, he was disqualified and Marte Saldaña (no relation) of San Miguel, won the honor instead. Back then, he was said to have been the youngest player to join the PBA at 17 years old. However, after closer scrutiny, it turned out that Saldana was at least 4 years older than his claimed age.

Saldaña was known for his blue-collar work on the hardcourt, defending the opposing team's best player, collaring rebounds on both ends, diving for loose balls, setting up bone-crunching picks to free his teammates and even acting as the team enforcer. He was also a very capable scorer, with an accurate perimeter jumper and excellent pivot moves. Early in his career, he was known as the "Plastic Man" for his twisting hang-time shots inside the paint. In his first year with the Gilbey's Gin team in 1983, Saldaña easily emerged as the team's top local performer, leading his team in scoring and rebounding, thus, becoming the very first Most Improved Player Awardee in the PBA.

In 1987, Saldaña suffered one of the most gruesome injuries in the PBA when he overextended and violently twisted his knee when he landed badly while trying to block a shot attempt by, ironically, his namesake Marte Saldańa, then of Hills Bros. Coffee. He, however, miraculously recovered from what many perceived as a career-ending injury and even went on to play for at least 16 seasons in the PBA as a power forward. He may have been a journeyman, having played for at least six different PBA teams but there’s no denying how coaches appreciated his game. In his late 30s, he remained a key player for Gordon’s Gin’s successful championship bid in the 1997 PBA Commissioner's Cup finals against Alaska. In 2000, he suited up for Red Bull when he was about 42 years old, one of the very few PBA players to play at age 40.

== Death ==
Saldaña died on February 1, 2023, nearly 23 years after he retired, following a "lingering kidney ailment". He was 64.
