= 1997 Sta. Lucia Realtors season =

- Head coach: Chot Reyes; Adonis Tierra
- Owner: Sta. Lucia Realty and Development Corporation

All-Filipino Cup results
- Record: 13–10 (56.5%)
- Place: 3rd
- Playoff finish: Semifinals

Commissioner's Cup results
- Record: 8–11 (42.1%)
- Place: 4th
- Playoff finish: Semifinals

Governor's Cup results
- Record: 10–9 (52.6%)
- Place: 4th
- Playoff finish: Semifinals

Sta. Lucia Realtors seasons

The 1997 Sta. Lucia Realtors season was the 5th season of the franchise in the Philippine Basketball Association (PBA).

== Draft picks ==
Round	Pick	Player	College
1	3	Jason Webb	De La Salle
1	6	Gabby Cui	Ateneo de Manila
1	8	Angelo David	FEU

== Notable dates ==
July 22: Sta. Lucia advanced to the Commissioners Cup semifinals with a 100-92 overtime victory over Purefoods Cowboys. Kenny Redfield, the two-time best import who led Shell to the finals in the previous season, and playing with his fourth team with the Realtors, scored his 27th triple-double performance of 34 points, 18 rebounds and 12 assists. With the victory, Sta. Lucia were tied on top of the standings with three other teams, San Miguel, Shell and Gordon's Gin, with six wins and four losses.

September 28: Import Sean Green carried the Realtors with his team-high 35 points as Sta. Lucia scored their third straight victory and a solo lead in the Governors Cup with a 111-90 rout off Pop Cola.

== Occurrences ==
After a four-year coaching stint with the Purefoods ballclub, coach Chot Reyes accepted the offer of Sta. Lucia as their new head coach at the beginning of the season.

During the Governors Cup, a few days after Sta. Lucia lost to Alaska by one point on October 28, coach Chot Reyes resigned and gave up his position to assistant coach Adonis Tierra, who would handle the Realtors on an interim basis. It was reported that Reyes' temperament had lost him his job at Sta. Lucia, and the players' boycott against their coach led to his departure.

== Roster ==
1997 Sta. Lucia Realtors roster
Players

Pos.	#	POB	Name	Height	Weight	DOB (YYYY–MM–DD)	From
G	1	(Philippines)	Jason Webb	6 ft 2 in (1.88 m)			De La Salle
F	3	(United States)	Chris Jackson	6 ft 4 in (1.93 m)			San Bernardino Valley
G	5	(Philippines)	Gilbert Reyes	5 ft 8 in (1.73 m)			Ateneo
G/F	9	(Philippines)	Boy Cabahug	5 ft 11 in (1.80 m)			Visayas
F	12	(Philippines)	Jose Francisco	6 ft 0 in (1.83 m)			Far Eastern
G	14	(Philippines)	Gerry Esplana	6 ft 0 in (1.83 m)			Far Eastern
F	15	(Philippines)	Expedito Falcasantos	6 ft 4 in (1.93 m)			Cebu
C	16	(Philippines)	Dennis Espino	6 ft 6 in (1.98 m)			UST
C	38	(Philippines)	Angelo David	6 ft 6 in (1.98 m)			Far Eastern
F	57	(Philippines)	Romeo Dela Rosa	6 ft 2 in (1.88 m)			Southwestern-U
C	72	(Philippines)	Jun Limpot	6 ft 5 in (1.96 m)			De La Salle
F/C	81	(Philippines)	Gabby Cui	6 ft 4 in (1.93 m)			Ateneo

Coaches

Head coach

- (Philippines) Chot Reyes (All-Filipino/Commissioner's Cup)
- (Philippines) Adonis Tierra (Governors Cup)

Assistant coach(es)

- (Philippines) Adonis Tierra (All-Filipino/Commissioner's Cup)
- (Philippines) Ricardo Cui
- (Philippines) Joshua Villapando

Team manager

- (Philippines) Buddy Encarnado

Legend

- (C) Team captain
- Injured

== Transactions ==
=== Trades ===
Off-season	To Alaska Boyet Fernandez	To Sta. Lucia Gilbert Reyes, Jr

=== Additions ===
Player	Signed	Former team
Boy Cabahug	Off-season	Mobiline

=== Recruited imports ===
Tournament	Name	Number	Position	University/college	Duration
Commissioner's Cup	Kenny Redfield	23	Forward	Michigan State	June 15 to August 26
Governors' Cup	Sean Green	7	Guard-forward	Iona College	September 21 to December 5
