= Elmer Lago =

Filipino basketball player (born 1972)

Personal information
- Born: February 13, 1972 (age 54)
- Listed height: 6 ft 3 in (1.91 m)
- Listed weight: 188 lb (85 kg)

Career information
- College: De La Salle
- PBA draft: 1995: 2nd round, 11th overall pick
- Drafted by: Formula Shell Gas Kings
- Playing career: 1995–2005
- Position: Shooting guard / Small forward
- Number: 2, 3, 20

Career history
- 1995–1996: Formula Shell Zoom Masters
- 1997–1998: Purefoods Tender Juicy Hotdogs
- 1999–2001: Barangay Ginebra Kings
- 2002: Talk 'N Text Phone Pals
- 2002–2003: Barangay Ginebra Kings

Career highlights
- As player: PBA champion (1997 All-Filipino); PBA All-Star (1997); PBA Most Improved Player (1999)

Elmer Lago (born February 13, 1972) is a retired Filipino professional basketball player. He is the younger brother of Dwight Lago.

== Playing career ==
A former La Salle Green Archer, Lago played for Formula Shell Zoom Masters, Purefoods Tender Juicy Hotdogs, Talk 'N Text Phone Pals, and Barangay Ginebra Kings, on his PBA days.
