= Rodney Santos =

Filipino basketball player and coach

San Sebastian Stags
- Title: Head coach
- League: NCAA Philippines

Personal information
- Born: May 30, 1973 (age 53) Meycauayan, Bulacan, Philippines
- Listed height: 6 ft 2 in (1.88 m)
- Listed weight: 175 lb (79 kg)

Career information
- High school: San Sebastian (Manila)
- College: San Sebastian
- PBA draft: 1996: 1st round, 2nd overall pick
- Drafted by: Purefoods Tender Juicy Hotdogs
- Playing career: 1996–2009
- Position: Shooting guard / small forward
- Coaching career: 2013–present

Career history

Playing
- 1996: Purefoods TJ Hotdogs
- 1997–2002: Alaska Milkmen
- 2003: Purefoods TJ Hotdogs
- 2004–2008: Barangay Ginebra Kings
- 2008–2009: Coca-Cola Tigers

Coaching
- 2013–2014: San Sebastian (assistant)
- 2015: ATC Livermarin
- 2015: San Sebastian
- 2016–2022: UP (assistant)
- 2021: Rizal Golden Coolers
- 2022: UST (assistant)
- 2025: Mindoro Tamaraws
- 2026: San Sebastian (assistant)
- 2026–present: San Sebastian

Career highlights
- as player: 7× PBA champion (1997 Governors', 1998 All-Filipino, 1998 Commissioner's, 2000 All-Filipino, 2004 Fiesta, 2004-05 Philippine, 2006-07 Philippine, 2008 Fiesta); 2× PBA All Star (1996, 2000); 2× PBA Mr. Quality Minutes (1998–1999); PBA Buzzerbeater Event Co-Champion (1999); 3× NCAA men's champion (1993, 1994, 1995); NCAA men's Most Valuable Player (1994); as assistant coach: 1× UAAP champion (2021)
Medals
Men's basketball
Representing Philippines
SEA Games
Gold medal – first place	1993 Singapore	Team
Gold medal – first place	1995 Chiang Mai	Team

John Rodney Santos (born May 30, 1973) is a Filipino retired professional basketball player who is the current head coach of the San Sebastian Stags of the NCAA PH. He is also known as The Slasher for his slashing ability going to the basket.

He currently serves as commissioner of the basketball league Sinag Liga Asya.

== Collegiate career ==
Santos played for the San Sebastian high school and college teams from 1991 to 1995, winning the Most Valuable Player award in 1994.

== Professional career ==
After a storied college career at San Sebastian, Santos was drafted second overall by Purefoods in the 1996 draft. Then he was traded to Alaska for Cris Bolado and Bryant Punzalan in 1997 and became one of Tim Cone's reliable contributors off the bench. He was re-acquired by Purefoods in 2003 as a free agent. After his stint with the TJ Hotdogs, he was then traded to Ginebra, and was a vital cog in coach Siot Tanquincen's rotation. His last stop was with the Coca-Cola Tigers before nagging injuries forced him into retirement.

== PBA career statistics ==
Legend
GP	Games played	MPG	Minutes per game
FG%	Field-goal percentage	3P%	3-point field-goal percentage	FT%	Free-throw percentage
RPG	Rebounds per game	APG	Assists per game	SPG	Steals per game
BPG	Blocks per game	PPG	Points per game	**Bold**	Career high

=== Season-by-season averages ===
Year	Team	GP	MPG	FG%	3P%	FT%	RPG	APG	SPG	BPG	PPG
1996	Purefoods	49	15.8	.439	.158	.720	1.2	1.2	.8	.2	6.8
1997	Alaska	34	10.4	.452	.000	.625	1.0	.7	.2	.2	3.9
1998	Alaska	65	22.7	.464	.000	.765	2.4	1.5	.7	**.3**	7.2
1999	Alaska	56	22.0	**.527**	.000	.663	2.1	1.7	.8	**.3**	8.2
2000	Alaska	49	25.5	.507	.250	.670	2.4	1.8	1.0	.2	**11.1**
2001	Alaska	45	28.8	.429	.250	.782	2.6	2.1	.9	.2	8.5
2002	Alaska	59	19.4	.408	.356	.723	2.1	1.3	.7	.1	5.7
2003	Purefoods	36	22.0	.374	.293	.690	2.1	1.6	.9	.2	7.6
2004–05	Barangay Ginebra	**78**	**31.0**	.397	.279	.776	**2.7**	**2.8**	**1.1**	**.3**	9.9
2005–06	Barangay Ginebra	32	25.2	.349	.282	.699	2.3	1.8	.9	.1	7.8
2006–07	Barangay Ginebra	19	13.1	.383	.353	.667	.9	.7	.5	.0	4.4
2007–08	Barangay Ginebra	2	7.5	.429	**.500**	—	1.0	.5	.0	.0	3.5
2008–09	Coca-Cola	12	7.8	.303	.167	**1.000**	.8	.4	.0	.0	2.4
Career		536	22.2	.434	.283	.721	2.1	1.7	.8	.2	7.6

== Coaching career ==
=== San Sebastian ===
Santos served as part of San Sebastian's coaching staff. He entered the Stags coaching staff after coach Topex Robinson returned to the team for a second spell as coach in 2013. In 2015, he was officially named head coach of the Stags, replacing Robinson. He also coached the PBA D-League team, ATC Livermarin. The Stags finished the season in 7th place, off the playoff positions. Santos was replaced by Edgar Macaraya in 2016.

=== Assistant coach stints ===
Santos then became a part of Bo Perasol's coaching staff at UP. In 2022, Santos joined former Ginebra teammate Bal David at UST. UST finished last, losing 13 consecutive games after winning its season opener; David resigned, Santos then manned practices until Pido Jarencio was appointed as new coach.

=== Back at San Sebastian ===
In 2026, Santos returned to San Sebastian, after the departure of erstwhile coach Tony Tan. He coached the Stags to a winless campaign in the 2026 Filoil EcoOil Preseason Cup in preparation for NCAA Season 102.

== Coaching record ==
Season	Team	Elimination round						Playoffs			
Season	Team	Finish	GP	W	L	PCT	PG	W	L	PCT	Results
2015	SSC-R	7th	18	6	12	.333	—	—	—	—	Eliminated
Totals			18	6	12	.333	—	—	—	—	0 championships

Preceded by Topex Robinson	San Sebastian Golden Stags men's basketball head coach 2015	Succeeded by Egay Macaraya
Preceded by Rob Labagala	San Sebastian Golden Stags men's basketball head coach 2026-present	Succeeded by incumbent
