= 1997 PBA season =

23rd PBA season

- Duration: February 16 – December 14, 1997
- Teams: 8
- TV partner: Vintage Sports (IBC)

1997 PBA Draft
- Top draft pick: Andy Seigle
- Picked by: Mobiline Cellulars
- Season MVP: Alvin Patrimonio (Purefoods Carne Norte Beefies)
- All-Filipino Cup champions: Purefoods Corned Beef Cowboys
- All-Filipino Cup runners-up: Gordon's Gin Boars
- Commissioner's Cup champions: Gordon's Gin Boars
- Commissioner's Cup runners-up: Alaska Milkmen
- Governors Cup champions: Alaska Milkmen
- Governors Cup runners-up: Purefoods Carne Norte Beefies

Seasons
- ← 1996 1998 →

The 1997 PBA season was the 23rd season of the Philippine Basketball Association (PBA).

== Board of governors ==
=== Executive committee ===
- Emilio P. Bernardino, Jr. (Commissioner)
- Nazario L. Avendaño (Chairman, representing San Miguel Beermen)
- Bernabe L. Navarro, Jr. (Vice-Chairman, representing Gordon's Gin Boars)
- Reynaldo G. Gamboa (Treasurer, representing Formula Shell Zoommasters)

=== Teams ===
Team	Company	Governor	Alternate Governor
Alaska Milkmen	Alaska Milk Corporation	Wilfred Steven Uytengsu	Joaquin Trillo
Formula Shell Zoommasters	Pilipinas Shell Petroleum Corporation	Reynaldo Gamboa	Eliseo Santiago
Gordon's Gin Boars	La Tondeña Distillers, Inc.	Bernabe Navarro, Jr.	Roberto Eduardo
Mobiline Phone Pals	Lapanday Holdings Corporation	Luis F. Lorenzo	Ignatius F. Yenko
Pop Cola 800s	RFM Corporation	Elmer Yanga	Atty. Aurora Timbol
Purefoods Tender Juicy Hotdogs	Purefoods Corporation	Teodoro Dimayuga	Eliezer Capacio
San Miguel Beermen	San Miguel Corporation	Nazario Avendaño	
Sta. Lucia Realtors	Sta. Lucia Realty and Development Corporation	Manuel Encarnado	Vicente R. Santos

== Season highlights ==
- For the first time in league history, the top two picks of the Annual Rookie draft were born outside the Philippines, 6–9 Andrew John Seigle, and Nic Belasco were selected at numbers one and two, respectively.
- Purefoods Corned Beef Cowboys and Gordon's Gin Boars (formerly Ginebra) played in the All-Filipino Cup finals. This is only the second time the two rivals meet in a championship series. Gordon's playing coach Sonny Jaworski became the oldest player to play in a PBA finals series at age 51. Purefoods rookie coach Eric Altamirano won his first title as a head mentor.
- Gordon's Gin Boars ended a six-year title drought for the La Tondeña franchise by winning the Commissioner's Cup title over defending champion Alaska Milkmen.
- The Alaska Milkmen retains the Governors' Cup title for the fourth straight time and defend the only crown left in their grandslam conquest last season. Alaska has overtaken the defunct Presto franchise as the fourth winningest ballclub in the PBA.
- Alvin Patrimonio won his fourth MVP award, tying Ramon Fernandez for the most number of MVP awards.

== Opening ceremonies ==
The muses for the participating teams are as follows:

Team	Muse
Alaska Milkmen	Carmela Lastimosa & Sha Sha Hawkins
Formula Shell Zoom Masters	Teresa Herrera
Gordon's Gin Boars	Ruffa Mae Quinto
Mobiline Cellulars	Joey Mead
Pop Cola Bottlers	Gill Baltazar
Purefoods Corned Beef Cowboys	Ciara Sotto
San Miguel Beermen	Leng Damiles
Sta. Lucia Realtors	Sherilyn Reyes

== Champions ==
- All-Filipino Cup: Purefoods Corned Beef Cowboys
- Commissioner's Cup: Gordon's Gin Boars
- Governor's Cup: Alaska Milkmen
- Team with best win–loss percentage: Alaska Milkmen (35–25, .583)
- Best Team of the Year: Alaska Milkmen (2nd)

== All-Filipino Cup ==
=== Elimination round ===
Pos	Team	W	L	PCT	GB	Qualification
1	Gordon's Gin Boars	10	4	.714	—	Semifinal round
2	Purefoods Corned Beef Cowboys	8	6	.571	2	Semifinal round
3	Sta. Lucia Realtors	8	6	.571	2	Semifinal round
4	San Miguel Beermen	7	7	.500	3	Semifinal round
5	Mobiline Cellulars	7	7	.500	3	Semifinal round
6	Alaska Milkmen	6	8	.429	4	
7	Pop Cola Bottlers	5	9	.357	5	
8	Formula Shell Zoom Masters	5	9	.357	5	

=== Semifinal round ===
Overall standings
Pos	Team	W	L	PCT	GB	Qualification
1	Purefoods Corned Beef Cowboys	14	8	.636 (Note: Head-to-head record: Purefoods 3–1 Gordon's)	—	Advance to the Finals
2	Gordon's Gin Boars	14	8	.636	—	Advance to the Finals
3	Sta. Lucia Realtors	12	10	.545	2	Proceed to third place playoff
4	San Miguel Beermen	11	11	.500	3	Proceed to third place playoff
5	Mobiline Cellulars	9	13	.409	5	

Notes:

Semifinal round standings
Pos	Team	W	L
1	Purefoods Corned Beef Cowboys	6	2
2	San Miguel Beermen	4	4
3	Gordon's Gin Boars	4	4
4	Sta. Lucia Realtors	4	4
5	Mobiline Cellulars	2	6

=== Third place playoff ===
Team 1	Score	Team 2
(3) Sta. Lucia Realtors	75–64	(4) San Miguel Beermen

=== Finals ===
Team 1	Series	Team 2	Game 1	Game 2	Game 3	Game 4	Game 5	Game 6	Game 7
(1) Purefoods Corned Beef Cowboys	4–2	(2) Gordon's Gin Boars	103–90	91–73	83–92	94–84	95–96	82–73	—

- Finals MVP: Alvin Patrimonio (Purefoods)
- Best Player of the Conference: Nelson Asaytono (San Miguel)

== Commissioner's Cup ==
=== Elimination round ===
Pos	Team	W	L	PCT	GB	Qualification
1	Gordon's Gin Boars	6	4	.600	—	Semifinal round
2	San Miguel Beermen	6	4	.600	—	Semifinal round
3	Formula Shell Zoom Masters	6	4	.600	—	Semifinal round
4	Sta. Lucia Realtors	6	4	.600	—	Semifinal round
5	Alaska Milkmen	5	5	.500	1	Semifinal round
6	Mobiline Cellulars	4	6	.400	2	
7	Pop Cola Bottlers	4	6	.400	2	
8	Purefoods Corned Beef Cowboys	3	7	.300	3	

=== Semifinal round ===
Overall standings
Pos	Team	W	L	PCT	GB	Qualification
1	Alaska Milkmen	11	7	.611 (Note: Head-to-head quotient: Alaska 1.041. Gordon's 0.994, San Miguel 0.945)	—	Advance to the finals (Note: If a team outside the top two teams wins at least five semifinal round games, then it and the second-placed team will playoff for the last finals berth; otherwise, the top 2 teams qualify outright.)
2	Gordon's Gin Boars	11	7	.611	—	Guaranteed finals berth playoff
3	San Miguel Beermen	11	7	.611	—	Qualify to finals berth playoff
4	Sta. Lucia Realtors	8	10	.444 (Note: Head-to-head record: Sta. Lucia 2–1 Shell)	3	Proceed to third place playoff
5	Formula Shell Zoom Masters	8	10	.444	3	

Notes:

Semifinal round standings
Pos	Team	W	L	Qualification
1	Alaska Milkmen	6	2	
2	Gordon's Gin Boars	5	3	
3	San Miguel Beermen	5	3	Qualify to finals berth playoff (Note: Alaska qualified outright as #1 seeded team, Gordon's Gin guaranteed finals berth playoff as #2 seeded team; finals berth playoff: Gordon's Gin 106–100 San Miguel (2OT))
4	Sta. Lucia Realtors	2	6	
5	Formula Shell Zoom Masters	2	6	

=== Third place playoff ===
Team 1	Score	Team 2
(3) San Miguel Beermen	96–95	(4) Sta. Lucia Realtors

=== Finals ===
Team 1	Series	Team 2	Game 1	Game 2	Game 3	Game 4	Game 5	Game 6	Game 7
(1) Alaska Milkmen	2–4	(2) Gordon's Gin Boars	89–99	96–102	86–87	108–90	86–81	79–105	—

- Finals MVP: Marlou Aquino (Gordon's Gin)
- Best Player of the Conference: Kenneth Duremdes (Alaska)
- Best Import of the Conference: Jeff Ward (San Miguel)

== Governors' Cup ==
=== Elimination round ===
Pos	Team	W	L	PCT	GB	Qualification
1	San Miguel Beermen	9	5	.643 (Note: Head-to-head quotient: San Miguel 1.027, Alaska 1.000, Sta. Lucia 0.975)	—	Advance to semifinals
2	Alaska Milkmen	9	5	.643	—	Advance to semifinals
3	Sta. Lucia Realtors	9	5	.643	—	Twice-to-beat in the quarterfinals
4	Purefoods Carne Norte Beefies	8	6	.571	1	Twice-to-beat in the quarterfinals
5	Mobiline Cellulars	7	7	.500 (Note: Head-to-head record: Mobiline 2–0 Gordon's)	2	Twice-to-win in the quarterfinals
6	Gordon's Gin Boars	7	7	.500	2	Twice-to-win in the quarterfinals
7	Pop Cola Sizzlers	5	9	.357	4	
8	Formula Shell Zoom Masters	2	12	.143	7	

=== Playoffs ===
Quarterfinals (Higher seeds twice-to-beat)
4	Purefoods	93
5	Mobiline	91
3	Sta. Lucia	102
6	Gordon's Gin	93

Semifinals (Best-of-5)
1	San Miguel	2
4	Purefoods	3
2	Alaska	3
3	Sta. Lucia	0

Finals (Best-of-7)
4	Purefoods	1
2	Alaska	4
Third place
1	San Miguel	99
3	Sta. Lucia	89

==== Quarterfinals ====
Team 1	Series	Team 2	Game 1	Game 2
(3) Sta. Lucia Realtors*	1–0	(6) Gordon's Gin Boars	102–93	—
(4) Purefoods Carne Norte Beefies*	1–0	(5) Mobiline Phone Pals	93–91	—

*Team has twice-to-beat advantage. Team 1 only has to win once, while Team 2 has to win twice.

==== Semifinals ====
Team 1	Series	Team 2	Game 1	Game 2	Game 3	Game 4	Game 5
(1) San Miguel Beermen	2–3	(4) Purefoods Carne Norte Beefies	96–82	73–80	91–89	84–94	89–91
(2) Alaska Milkmen	3–0	(3) Sta. Lucia Realtors	83–69	107–87	95–80	—	—

==== Third place playoff ====
Team 1	Score	Team 2
(1) San Miguel Beermen	99–89	(3) Sta. Lucia Realtors

==== Finals ====
Team 1	Series	Team 2	Game 1	Game 2	Game 3	Game 4	Game 5	Game 6	Game 7
(2) Alaska Milkmen	4–1	(4) Purefoods Carne Norte Beefies	76–87	85–79	96–85	92–75	94–66	—	—

- Finals MVP: Johnny Abarrientos (Alaska)
- Best Player of the Conference: Alvin Patrimonio (Purefoods)
- Best Import of the Conference: Larry Robinson (San Miguel)

== Individual awards ==
- Most Valuable Player: Alvin Patrimonio (Purefoods)
- Rookie of the Year: Andy Seigle (Mobiline)
- Sportsmanship Award: Freddie Abuda (San Miguel)
- Most Improved Player: Bong Ravena (Purefoods)
- Defensive Player of the Year: Freddie Abuda (San Miguel)
- Mythical Five:
  - Johnny Abarrientos (Alaska)
  - Alvin Patrimonio (Purefoods)
  - Marlou Aquino (Gordon's Gin)
  - Vince Hizon (Gordon's Gin)
  - Nelson Asaytono (San Miguel)
- Mythical Second Team:
  - Noli Locsin (Gordon's Gin)
  - Dindo Pumaren (Purefoods)
  - Bong Ravena (Purefoods)
  - Jun Limpot (Sta. Lucia)
  - Jerry Codiñera (Purefoods)
- All Defensive Team:
  - Jerry Codiñera (Purefoods)
  - Freddie Abuda (San Miguel)
  - Johnny Abarrientos (Alaska)
  - Jeffrey Cariaso (Mobiline)
  - Marlou Aquino (Gordon's Gin)

== Awards given by the PBA Press Corps ==
- Coach of the Year: Ron Jacobs (San Miguel)
- Mr. Quality Minutes: Paul Alvarez (San Miguel)
- Executive of the Year: Simon Mossesgeld (Purefoods)
- Comeback Player of the Year: Paul Alvarez (San Miguel)
- Referee of the Year: Ernesto de Leon

== Cumulative standings ==
Pos	Team	Pld	W	L	PCT	Best finish
1	Alaska Milkmen	60	35	25	.583	Champions
2	Gordon's Gin Boars	68	39	29	.574	Champions
3	San Miguel Beermen	63	35	28	.556	Third place
4	Purefoods Corned Beef Cowboys/Carne Norte Beefies	63	34	29	.540	Champions
5	Sta. Lucia Realtors	61	31	30	.508	Third place
6	Mobiline Phone Pals	47	20	27	.426	Semifinalist
7	Pop Cola Bottlers/Sizzlers	38	14	24	.368	Elimination round
8	Formula Shell Zoom Masters	46	15	31	.326	Semifinalist

=== Elimination round ===
Pos	Team	Pld	W	L	PCT
1	Gordon's Gin Boars	38	23	15	.605
2	Sta. Lucia Realtors	38	23	15	.605
3	San Miguel Beermen	38	22	16	.579
4	Alaska Milkmen	38	20	18	.526
5	Purefoods Corned Beef Cowboys/Carne Norte Beefies	38	19	19	.500
6	Mobiline Phone Pals	38	18	20	.474
7	Pop Cola Bottlers/Sizzlers	38	14	24	.368
8	Formula Shell Zoom Masters	38	13	25	.342

=== Playoffs ===
Pos	Team	Pld	W	L
1	Gordon's Gin Boars	30	16	14
2	Alaska Milkmen	22	15	7
3	Purefoods Corned Beef Cowboys/Carne Norte Beefies	25	15	10
4	San Miguel Beermen	25	13	12
5	Sta. Lucia Realtors	23	8	15
6	Formula Shell Zoom Masters	8	2	6
7	Mobiline Phone Pals	9	2	7
8	Pop Cola Bottlers/Sizzlers	0	0	0
