= Vince Hizon =

Filipino-American basketball player

Personal information
- Born: November 25, 1970 (age 55) Orange County, California, U.S.
- Listed height: 6 ft 2 in (1.88 m)
- Listed weight: 200 lb (91 kg)

Career information
- High school: Mater Dei (Santa Ana, California)
- College: Cypress College (1988–1990); Boise State (1990–1991); Biola (1991–1992); Ateneo (1993–1994)
- PBA draft: 1994: 1st round, 8th overall pick
- Drafted by: Purefoods Tender Juicy Giants
- Playing career: 1994–2004
- Position: Shooting guard
- Number: 12, 25
- Coaching career: 2006-2007, 2017–2019

Career history

Playing
- 1994: Purefoods TJ Hotdogs
- 1995–1998: Ginebra San Miguel
- 1999–2000: Iloilo Megavoltz
- 2001–2004: Red Bull Barako
- 2004: Pennsylvania ValleyDawgs

Coaching
- 2006–2007: Coca-Cola Tigers (assistant)
- 2017–2019: Blackwater Elite / Blackwater Bossing (consultant)

Career highlights
- Philippine Basketball Association Mythical First Team (1997); 4x PBA champion (1994 Commissioner's, 1997 Commissioner's, 2001 Commissioner's, 2002 Commissioner's)

Vicente Paul Bowie Hizon (born November 25, 1970) is an American-born Filipino retired professional basketball player. He is the former commissioner of the Filsports Basketball Association. FBA, a community-based grassroots basketball league in the Philippines. He is currently a motivational speaker while focusing on family and business.

== Philippine National Team ==
in 2001, Hizon played in Philippine National Team in Malaysia South East Asian Games with MBA players and win a gold medal.

== Biography ==
Vince Hizon was born 25 November 1970 to José Palma-Gil Hizon and Harriet M. Bowie in Orange County, California. The Hizon-Palma Gil family has roots in Davao Oriental province and Davao City in the Philippines. He grew up in Stanton, California and attended Mater Dei High School in Santa Ana, California. Showing promise as a basketball player in high school, he went on to play basketball at Cypress College in Cypress, California (1988–1990) before earning a basketball scholarship to Boise State University (1991) and later Biola University (1992), before ending his college basketball career as star player with the Ateneo Blue Eagles during his UAAP years 1993–94.

Playing sparingly as a rookie in his one year for Purefoods in 1994, he asked for and was traded to Ginebra San Miguel for Nonoy Chuatico and a first round draft pick. Playing for then-playing and legendary coach Robert Jaworski's never-say-die system, Hizon flourished and became the #1 most popular player in the league as well as the most popular sports figure in the Philippines at the time, according to the A.C. Nielsen Asian Rim Survey in 1998.

Hizon spent most of his 11-year pro career for the Ginebra franchise in the Philippine Basketball Association. He won 1 PBL title, 4 PBA titles, one Southeast Asian Games gold medal and 1 USBL championship throughout the course of his stellar career. He was even named as part of the PBA's Mythical 5 selection in 1997. Hizon was known for his clutch three point shooting and his slashing drives to the basket. He is also popularly known as "The Prince" in Philippine Basketball Association.

Having accomplished so much on the court, while also playing for the Philippine National Team competing internationally, he was enticed to create a sports show for the ABS-CBN television network. This show was shown worldwide through the Filipino Channel. Hizon was also a much sought after commercial personality doing numerous advertisements in television and print. Since then he has also had a show on MTV Philippines known as MTV bolahan.

When Robert Jaworski (along with his son, Robert "Dodot" Jaworski) retired in 1999 from the Ginebra team, Hizon bolted the PBA with the enticing offer of the Iloilo MegaVoltz in the Metropolitan Basketball Association. At the time, the contract turned out to be the biggest contract in Philippine basketball history. Unhappy with the direction of the league though, Hizon decided to re-join the PBA as a member of the Red Bull Barakos in 2002 and played for two years. In 2004, he joined the Pennsylvania Valleydawgs in the United States Basketball League and will forever be in the history books as the first Filipino player to play professionally in the United States. His team, coached by the popular Darryl Dawkins, known as 'Chocolate Thunder' in the National Basketball Association, won the USBL crown that year.

He is married to sports broadcaster (the first female anchor of the PBA) and writer Patricia Bermudez-Hizon to whom he proposed on air Araneta Coliseum during halftime of a game in June 2003. The proposal was a first in PBA and Araneta Coliseum history and was witnessed by thousands of spectators and millions of television viewers. They have two boys and a girl together.

Since retirement from basketball with the 2006 disbanding of the Valleydawgs, Hizon has shifted his focus to more involvement with numerous environmental projects throughout the Philippines. Hizon was also voted as the first commissioner of the Filsports Basketball Association, an amateur community-based basketball league in the Philippines.
