= 2014–15 Barangay Ginebra San Miguel season =

- Head coach: Jeffrey Cariaso (October 17, 2014 – January 5, 2015); Ato Agustin (January 5 – March 31, 2015); Frankie Lim (March 31 – July 12, 2015)
- Owner(s): Ginebra San Miguel, Inc. (a San Miguel Corporation subsidiary)

Philippine Cup results
- Record: 6–5 (54.5%)
- Place: 5th
- Playoff finish: Quarterfinalist (lost to Talk 'N Text Tropang Texters in the 2nd round)

Commissioner's Cup results
- Record: 5–6 (45.5%)
- Place: 8th
- Playoff finish: Quarterfinalist (lost to Rain or Shine Elasto Painters with twice-to-win disadvantage)

Governors' Cup results
- Record: 5–6 (45.5%)
- Place: 8th
- Playoff finish: Quarterfinalist (lost to Alaska Aces with twice-to-win disadvantage)

Barangay Ginebra San Miguel seasons

The 2014–15 Barangay Ginebra San Miguel season was the 36th season of the franchise in the Philippine Basketball Association (PBA).

== Key dates ==
=== 2014 ===
- August 24: The 2014 PBA Draft took place in Midtown Atrium, Robinson Place Manila.
- September 9: Barangay Ginebra had an exhibition match against the Korean Basketball League team Changwon LG Sakers at the Smart Araneta Coliseum.

=== 2015 ===
- January 5: Team manager Alfrancis Chua announced the reappointment of Ato Agustin as Ginebra head coach after two conferences with Jeffrey Cariaso. Cariaso was then hired by Alaska as an assistant coach.
- March 30: Barangay Ginebra fired head coach Ato Agustin. He was replaced by assistant coach Frankie Lim.

== Draft picks ==
Round	Pick	Player	Position	Nationality	PBA D-League team	College
1	6	Rodney Brondial	F/C	Philippines	Big Chill Super Chargers	Adamson

== Roster ==
2014–15 Barangay Ginebra San Miguel roster
Players
Coaches

Pos.	#	POB	Name	Height	Weight	DOB (YYYY–MM–DD)	From
G	2	(United States)	Josh Urbiztondo	6 ft 1 in (1.85 m)	185 lb (84 kg)	1983-02-27	Fresno Pacific
G	3	(United States)	Solomon Mercado	6 ft 2 in (1.88 m)	195 lb (88 kg)	1984-05-06	Biola
C	4	(United States)	Dorian Peña	6 ft 7 in (2.01 m)	225 lb (102 kg)	1977-10-12	Coppin State
G	5	(Philippines)	LA Tenorio	5 ft 9 in (1.75 m)	155 lb (70 kg)	1984-07-09	Ateneo
G	6	(Philippines)	Emman Monfort	5 ft 7 in (1.70 m)	132 lb (60 kg)	1989-07-02	Ateneo
F/C	10	(Philippines)	Dave Marcelo	6 ft 6 in (1.98 m)	227 lb (103 kg)	1989-02-22	San Beda
G	13	(Philippines)	Jayjay Helterbrand	6 ft 0 in (1.83 m)	170 lb (77 kg)	1976-10-14	Kentucky State
G	17	(Germany)	Jens Knuttel	5 ft 10 in (1.78 m)	169 lb (77 kg)	1989-09-17	Far Eastern
C	20	(United States)	Greg Slaughter	7 ft 0 in (2.13 m)	258 lb (117 kg)	1988-05-19	Ateneo
F/C	25	(Philippines)	Japeth Aguilar	6 ft 9 in (2.06 m)	230 lb (104 kg)	1987-01-25	Western Kentucky
F	34	(United States)	Chris Ellis (injured) (IN)	6 ft 5 in (1.96 m)	185 lb (84 kg)	1988-12-05	Mary Hardin–Baylor
F	45	(Philippines)	Mac Baracael	6 ft 4 in (1.93 m)	205 lb (93 kg)	1985-04-14	Far Eastern
G	47	(Philippines)	Mark Caguioa (injured) (C)	6 ft 1 in (1.85 m)	190 lb (86 kg)	1979-11-19	Glendale CC (CA)
F	91	(Philippines)	Rodney Brondial (R)	6 ft 5 in (1.96 m)	210 lb (95 kg)	1990-11-20	Adamson
F/C	22	(United States)	Michael Dunigan (CI)	6 ft 9 in (2.06 m)	254 lb (115 kg)	1989-07-02	Oregon
F	33	(United States)	Orlando Johnson (GI)	6 ft 5 in (1.96 m)	220 lb (100 kg)	1989-03-11	UC Santa Barbara
G/F	14	(Mongolia)	Sanchir Tungalag (GI)	6 ft 4 in (1.93 m)	200 lb (91 kg)	1989-04-08	Otgontenger
G	14	(South Korea)	Kim Jiwan (GI)	6 ft 2 in (1.88 m)	180 lb (82 kg)	1990-06-02	Yonsei

Head coach

- (Philippines) Frankie Lim (San Beda)

Assistant coach(es)

- (Philippines) Olsen Racela (Ateneo)
- (Philippines) Freddie Abuda (Cebu)
- (United States) Kirk Collier (South Carolina State)
- (Philippines) Mark Jomalesa (UP Diliman)
- (Philippines) Kerby Raymundo (Letran)

Team manager

- (Philippines) Alfrancis Chua^{[a]} (UST)

Legend

- (C) Team captain
- (CI) Commissioner's Cup Import
- (GI) Governors' Cup Import
- (EI) EASL Import
- (DP) Unsigned draft pick
- (FA) Free agent
- (IN) Inactive
- (S) Suspended
- (R) Rookie
- Injured

Roster

- ^{a} Chua also serves as Barangay Ginebra's alternate governor.

== Philippine Cup ==
=== Eliminations ===
==== Standings ====
Pos	Team	W	L	PCT	GB	Qualification
1	San Miguel Beermen	9	2	.818 (Note: Head-to-head record: San Miguel 1–0 Rain or Shine)	—	Advance to semifinals
2	Rain or Shine Elasto Painters	9	2	.818	—	Advance to semifinals
3	Alaska Aces	8	3	.727 (Note: Head-to-head record: Alaska 1–0 Talk 'N Text)	1	Twice-to-beat in the quarterfinals
4	TNT Tropang Texters	8	3	.727	1	Twice-to-beat in the quarterfinals
5	Barangay Ginebra San Miguel	6	5	.545 (Note: Head-to-head quotient: Barangay Ginebra 1.07, Meralco 1.06, Purefoods Star 0.89)	3	Twice-to-beat in the quarterfinals
6	Meralco Bolts	6	5	.545	3	Twice-to-beat in the quarterfinals
7	Purefoods Star Hotshots	6	5	.545	3	Twice-to-win in the quarterfinals
8	GlobalPort Batang Pier	5	6	.455	4	Twice-to-win in the quarterfinals
9	Barako Bull Energy	4	7	.364 (Note: Head-to-head record: Barako Bull 1–0 NLEX)	5	Twice-to-win in the quarterfinals
10	NLEX Road Warriors	4	7	.364	5	Twice-to-win in the quarterfinals
11	Kia Sorento	1	10	.091	8	
12	Blackwater Elite	0	11	.000	9	

Source: PBA.ph

=== Playoffs ===
==== Bracket ====
Quarterfinals (1st phase)
(#3 twice to beat)
3	Alaska	82
10	NLEX	78
(#6 twice to beat)
6	Meralco	77
7	Purefoods Star	65
(#4 twice to beat)
4	Talk 'N Text	105
9	Barako Bull	76
(#5 twice to beat)
5	Barangay Ginebra	95
8	GlobalPort	78

Quarterfinals (2nd phase) (single elimination)
3	Alaska	87
6	Meralco	69
4	Barangay Ginebra	97
5	Talk N' Text	83

Semifinals (best-of-7)
2	Rain or Shine	2
3	Alaska	4
1	Barangay Ginebra	4
4	San Miguel	0

Finals (best-of-7)
3	Alaska	3
1	Barangay Ginebra	4

== Commissioner's Cup ==
=== Eliminations ===
==== Standings ====
Pos	Team	W	L	PCT	GB	Qualification
1	Rain or Shine Elasto Painters	8	3	.727 (Note: Head-to-head quotient: Rain or Shine 1.025, Talk 'N Text 1.010, Purefoods 0.969)	—	Twice-to-beat in the quarterfinals
2	Talk 'N Text Tropang Texters	8	3	.727	—	Twice-to-beat in the quarterfinals
3	Purefoods Star Hotshots	8	3	.727	—	Best-of-three quarterfinals
4	NLEX Road Warriors	6	5	.545 (Note: Head-to-head record: NLEX 1–0 Meralco)	2	Best-of-three quarterfinals
5	Meralco Bolts	6	5	.545	2	Best-of-three quarterfinals
6	Alaska Aces	5	6	.455 (Note: Head-to-head quotient: Alaska 1.021, Barako Bull 1.019, Barangay Ginebra 0.960)	3	Best-of-three quarterfinals
7	Barako Bull Energy	5	6	.455	3	Twice-to-win in the quarterfinals
8	Barangay Ginebra San Miguel	5	6	.455	3	Twice-to-win in the quarterfinals
9	San Miguel Beermen	4	7	.364 (Note: Head-to-head quotient: San Miguel 1.011, GlobalPort 0.995, Kia 0.994)	4	
10	GlobalPort Batang Pier	4	7	.364	4	
11	Kia Carnival	4	7	.364	4	
12	Blackwater Elite	3	8	.273	5	

Source: PBA.ph

=== Playoffs ===
==== Bracket ====
Quarterfinals
(#1 twice-to-beat)
1	Rain or Shine	92
8	Barangay Ginebra	91
(best-of-3)
4	NLEX	0
5	Meralco	2
(#2 twice-to-beat)
2	Talk 'N Text	127
7	Barako Bull	97
(best-of-3)
3	Purefoods Star	2
6	Alaska	0

Semifinals (best-of-5)
1	Rain or Shine	3
5	Meralco	0
2	Talk 'N Text	3
3	Purefoods Star	1

Finals (best-of-7)
1	Rain or Shine	3
2	Talk 'N Text	4

== Transactions ==
=== Trades ===
==== Pre-season ====
July 25, 2014	To Barangay Ginebra Joseph Yeo	To NLEX 2015 first round pick

==== Commissioner's Cup ====
February 3, 2015	To Barangay Ginebra Dorian Peña (from Barako Bull); 2015 2nd round pick (from Barako Bull)	To Barako Bull Justin Chua (from San Miguel); 2017 1st round pick (from San Miguel)	To San Miguel JR Reyes (from Barangay Ginebra)

March 31, 2015	To Barangay Ginebra 2015 first round pick	To Barako Bull Energy James Forrester; Dylan Ababou
April 6, 2015	To Barangay Ginebra Dave Marcelo	To Barako Bull Energy Billy Mamaril (traded to San Miguel then to GlobalPort)

=== Recruited imports ===
Tournament	Name	Debuted	Last game	Record
Commissioner's Cup	Michael Dunigan	January 27 (vs Meralco)	March 28 (vs Rain or Shine)	5–7
Governors' Cup	Orlando Johnson	May 8 (vs Alaska)	June 26 (vs Alaska)	5–7
Governors' Cup	(Mongolia) Sanchir Tungalag*	May 8 (vs Alaska)	May 31 (vs San Miguel)	2–4
Governors' Cup	(South Korea) Kim Jiwan*	June 3 (vs GlobalPort)	June 26 (vs Alaska)	3–3

(* Asian import)
