= Barangay Ginebra San Miguel draft history =

The Barangay Ginebra San Miguel participated in the first ever PBA draft in 1985, selecting Reynaldo Perez as the first be drafted by them at 5th overall.

They have 3 first overall picks in their franchise history. The first was in 1994 when they drafted Noli Locsin. The second was in 1996 when they drafted Marlou Aquino. The third and the last one was in 2013 when they drafted Greg Slaughter.

== Selections ==
Basketball positions
PG	Point guard
SG	Shooting guard
SF	Small forward
PF	Power forward
C	Center

Draft	Round	Pick	Player	Place of birth	Position	School	Ref
1985	1	5	Reynaldo Perez	Philippines	SG / SF	Mapúa	
1986	1	3	Dondon Ampalayo	Philippines	PF	USJ–R	
1987	1	3	Harmon Codiñera	Philippines	PF	FEU	
1987	2	5	Anthony Mendoza	Philippines	C / PF	Visayas	
1988	1	3	Anthony Poblador	Philippines	C	De La Salle	
1989	1	5	Romy Dela Rosa	Philippines	SF	Southwestern	
1989	2	11	Peter Aguilar	Philippines	C	Trinity	
1989	3	17	Fernando Garcia	Philippines	SF	Adamson	
1990	1	6	Hilario Villanil	Philippines	PF	USPF	
1990	2	14	Fernando Libed	Philippines	PG	Letran	
1991	1	5	Jayvee Gayoso	Philippines	SF / SG	Ateneo	
1992	1	8	Nonoy Chuatico	Philippines	SG	Ateneo	
1993	1	2	Victor Pablo	Philippines	PF / SF	FEU	
1994	1	1	Noli Locsin	Philippines	PF	De La Salle	
1994	2	9	Wilmer Ong	Philippines	PF / C	USLS	
1994	3	17	Jonas Mariano	Philippines	SG	De La Salle	
1994	4	22	Renato Cabaluna	Philippines	PF	UST	
1994	5	26	Jun Marzan	Philippines	SG / SF	Baguio	
1995	1	2	E.J. Feihl	Philippines	C	Adamson	
1995	2	10	Robert Jaworski Jr.	Philippines	SG / SF	Ateneo	
1995	3	17	Lou Regidor	Philippines	PG	San Carlos	
1996	1	1	Marlou Aquino	Philippines	C	Adamson	
1996	3	14	Gerardo Locsin	Philippines			
1997	1	7	Edward Naron	Philippines	SG	Visayas	
1997	2	14	Manuel Ortega Jr.	Philippines	PG	SLU	
1998	1	8	Steven Smith	United States	SG / SF	USIU	
1998	2	16	Erwin Framo	Philippines	SG	UM	
1999	1	2	Anastacio Mendoza	Philippines	PG	FEU	
1999	1	9	Danilo Aying	Philippines	SF	Southwestern	
1999	3	19	Marvin Isidro	United States		Farrington	
2000	Direct Hire		Jayjay Helterbrand	Philippines	PG / SG	Kentucky State	
2000	1	6	Egay Billones	Philippines	PG	Las Piñas	
2000	2	14	William Marasigan	Philippines		San Sebastian	
2001	1	3	Mark Caguioa	Philippines	SG	Glendale CC	
2001	2	13	Marlon Basco	Philippines	C	Luzon	
2001	3	23	Marlon Piodo	Philippines	PF	USJ–R	
2002	1	9	Chester Tolomia	Philippines	SG / SF	Perpetual	
2002	2	16	Gilbert Malabanan	Philippines	SF	Perpetual	
2002	3	26	Aries Dimaunahan	Philippines	PG / SG	UST	
2003	1	2	Rommel Adducul	Philippines	C	San Sebastian	
2003	2	11	Sunday Salvacion	Philippines	SF	Benilde	
2003	3	22	Rob Johnson	Philippines	PG	Bellevue	
2004	3	20	Theodore Hawkins Jr.	United States	SG	Cosumnes River	
2005	1	7	Michael Holper	United States	PF	San Diego State	
2006	No draft picks						
2007	1	10	Macky Escalona	Philippines	PG	Ateneo	
2008	No draft picks						
2009	1	7	Chris Timberlake	United States	PG	North Florida	
2009	2	17	Orlando Daroya	Philippines	SF	Arellano	
2010	1	7	John Wilson	Philippines	SG / SF	JRU	
2010	1	8	Jimbo Aquino	Philippines	SG / SF	San Sebastian	
2010	2	12	Rob Labagala	Philippines	PG	UE	
2011	1	9	Reil Cervantes	Philippines	PF	FEU	
2011	2	18	James Martinez	Philippines	PG / SG	UE	
2012	1	6	Chris Ellis	United States	SF	Mary Hardin–Baylor	
2012	1	8	Keith Jensen	United States	SF	NYU	
2012	3	28	Jerick Cañada	Philippines	PG	Adamson	
2012	4	35	Paul Zamar	Philippines	SG / PG	UE	
2012	5	38	JR Buensuceso	United States	PG	BYU–Hawaii	
2012	6	39	Elliot Tan	United States	SG	Biola	
2013	1	1	Greg Slaughter	United States	C	Ateneo	
2013	3	24	LA Revilla	Philippines	PG	De La Salle	
2013	4	33	John Usita	United States	C	Shoreline	
2013	5	39	Alvin Padilla	Philippines	SG	UP	
2013	6	42	Jens Knuttel	Germany	PG	FEU	
2014	1	6	Rodney Brondial	Philippines	PF	Adamson	
2015	1	5	Scottie Thompson	Philippines	SG / PG	Perpetual	
2015	2	16	Aljon Mariano	Philippines	SF / PF	UST	
2015	3	28	Dennice Villamor	Philippines	PF / SF	NU	
2016	Special draft		Kevin Ferrer	Philippines	SF / PF	UST	
2016	2	3	Jammer Jamito	Philippines	PF	St. Clare	
2016	2	9	Jericho De Guzman	Philippines	C	Benilde	
2017	1	12	Jett Manuel	Philippines	SG	UP	
2017	3	35	Mikey Cabahug	Philippines	SG	Ateneo	
2018	3	32	Matt Salem	United States	SF	NU	
2019	1	10	Arvin Tolentino	Philippines	SF / PF	FEU	
2019	2	13	Jerrick Balanza	Philippines	SG	Letran	
2019	2	22	Kent Salado	Philippines	PG	Arellano	
2019	3	33	Fran Asuncion	Philippines	SG	AMA	
2021	1	12	Ken Holmqvist	Philippines	C	FEU	
2021	2	13	Brian Enriquez	United States	SF / SG	William Woods	
2022	1	8	Javi Gómez de Liaño	Philippines	SF	UP	
2022	2	20	Jayson David	Philippines	SG / SF	Lyceum	
2022	3	32	Rence Alcoriza	Philippines	SG	Arellano	
2023	2	23	Ralph Cu	Philippines	PF / SF	De La Salle	
2023	3	34	Kim Aurin	Philippines	SG / SF	Perpetual	
2023	4	45	Franz Abuda	United States	SF	San Beda	
2023	5	56	Brandrey Bienes	Philippines	PF / C	FEU	
2024	1	3	RJ Abarrientos	Philippines	PG	FEU	
2024	2	17	Didat Hanapi	Philippines	SG / SF	Adamson	
2024	2	22	Paolo Hernandez	Philippines	SG	Mapúa	
2024	3	34	Paul Garcia	United States	SG	Ateneo	
2025	1	11	Sonny Estil	Philippines	SF	Letran	
2025	2	13	Mario Barasi	Philippines	C	Adamson	
2025	2	23	John Abis	Philippines	SF	Perpetual	

=== Notes ===
1.All players entering the draft are Filipinos until proven otherwise.
