= UAAP NCAA All-Star Game =

The University Athletic Association of the Philippines (UAAP)-National Collegiate Athletic Association (NCAA) All-Star Game is an interleague basketball game between selected players of the UAAP and the NCAA. Several side events, such as the slam dunk contest, were held from 2004 onwards. Prior to 2004, it was an interleague tournament between the semifinalists of both leagues.

The proceeds of the games proceed to Bantay Bata, an ABS-CBN foundation for needy children.

== Summaries ==
=== All-star games ===
Year	Venue	Winner	Score	Loser	MVP
2002	Araneta Coliseum, Quezon City	UE Red Warriors	2–0*	Ateneo Blue Eagles	Ronald Tubid
2003	Araneta Coliseum, Quezon City	FEU Tamaraws	77–55	De La Salle Green Archers	
2003	Araneta Coliseum, Quezon City	UAAP South	94–77	NCAA East	
2003	Araneta Coliseum, Quezon City	UAAP North	62–57	NCAA West	
2004	Araneta Coliseum, Quezon City	UAAP	58–54	NCAA	Toti Almeda
2004	Araneta Coliseum, Quezon City	NCAA	67–64	UAAP	Leo Najorda
2005	Araneta Coliseum, Quezon City	NCAA	76–64	UAAP	Leo Najorda
2005	Araneta Coliseum, Quezon City	NCAA	88–81	UAAP	Boyet Bautista
2006	Araneta Coliseum, Quezon City	NCAA Juniors	72–64	UAAP Juniors**	Dave Marcelo
2006	Araneta Coliseum, Quezon City	UAAP Seniors**	83–78	NCAA Seniors	Jojo Duncil
2007	The Arena in San Juan, San Juan	NCAA***	83–78	UAAP	RJ Jazul
2008	Ynares Sports Arena, Pasig	UAAP Juniors	90–78	NCAA Juniors***	Mark Juruena
2008	Ynares Sports Arena, Pasig	UAAP Seniors	91–80	NCAA Seniors	Jervy Cruz
2009	Filoil Flying V Arena, San Juan	NCAA Juniors	85–84	UAAP Juniors	Arthur dela Cruz
2009	Filoil Flying V Arena, San Juan	NCAA Seniors	76–60	UAAP Seniors	Jimbo Aquino
2010	Filoil Flying V Arena, San Juan	NCAA Juniors	85–81	UAAP Juniors	Baser Amer
2010	Filoil Flying V Arena, San Juan	UAAP Seniors	90–76	NCAA Seniors	Paul Lee

Notes:

*Best of 3 series
**UAAP was composed of only 7 schools as La Salle was suspended.
***NCAA was composed of only 7 schools as PCU was suspended.

=== Side events ===
Year	Slam dunk contest	Three-point shootout	2-ball competition
2003	Niño Canaleta	Wynsjohn Te	Louie Abad/Titus Mendoza
2004	Niño Canaleta	Chris Tiu	Patrick Cabahug/Leo Canuday
2005	Rey Guevarra	Alex Angeles	JB Sison/Jay-R Tecson
2006	Elmer Espiritu	Chris Tiu	Jim Viray/Anthony del Rio
2007	Rey Guevarra	JV Casio	Martin Reyes/Vicmel Epres
2008	Elmer Espiritu	Clark Bautista	(not held)
2009	Allein Maliksi	John Wilson	Joel Banal/ Ael Banal
2010	not held	Nate Matute	Bong Ravena/ Kiefer Ravena

== 2002 ==
2002 UAAP-NCAA Bantay Bata Showdown
Men's Finals	G1	G2	Wins
Ateneo Blue Eagles	69	85	0
UE Red Warriors	86	88	2
- Duration: October 26–27
- Arena(s): Araneta Coliseum
- Finals MVP: Ronald Tubid
- TV network(s): Studio 23

The 2002 tournament had three stages: the elimination round was an inter-league affair, but the standings are based between teams of the same league. The top two teams advance to a single round-robin semifinals. The two best teams from the semifinals dispute the championship in a best of three series.

=== Elimination round ===
==== NCAA ====
Team	W	L
San Sebastian Stags	3	1
Benilde Blazers	1	3
PCU Dolphins	1	3
JRU Heavy Bombers	0	4

==== UAAP ====
Team	W	L
UE Red Warriors	4	0
Ateneo Blue Eagles	3	1
UST Growling Tigers	3	1
De La Salle Green Archers	0	4

=== Semi-finals ===
Team	W	L
Ateneo Blue Eagles	3	0
UE Red Warriors	2	1
San Sebastian Stags	1	2
Benilde Blazers	0	3

=== Finals ===
UE def. Ateneo, 2 games to none.

== 2003 ==
The 2003 tournament was a single-elimination tournament, with the seedings based on the final positions in their respective leagues. UAAP runner-up Ateneo didn't join, so they were replaced with 5th placer Adamson.

Quarter-finals
Araneta Coliseum
(U-1) FEU	88
(N-4) Mapua	65
Araneta Coliseum
(U-3) UE	84
(N-3) JRU	56
Araneta Coliseum
(N-1) Letran	74
(U-5) Adamson	73
Araneta Coliseum
(U-4) La Salle	75
(N-2) San Sebastian	63

Semi-finals
Araneta Coliseum
(U-1) FEU	69
(U-3) UE	65
Araneta Coliseum
(N-1) Letran	66
(U-4) La Salle	84

Final
Araneta Coliseum
(U-1) FEU	77
(U-4) La Salle	55
Third place
Araneta Coliseum
(U-3) UE	79
(N-1) Letran	67

- All-star games:
  - UAAP South 94-77 NCAA East
  - UAAP North 62-57 NCAA West
- Slam dunk contest: Niño Canaleta (UE)
- Three-point shootout: Wynsjohn Te (JRU)
- 2-ball competition: Louie Abad and Titus Mendoza (CSB)

== 2004 ==
- All-star games:
  - UAAP (FEU/UST/UP/NU) 58-54 NCAA (PCU/Letran/Mapua/JRU)
    - All-star MVP: Toti Almeda (UP)
  - UAAP (Adamson/Ateneo/La Salle/UE) 64-67 NCAA (UPHR/San Beda/San Sebastian/CSB)
    - All-star MVP: Leo Najorda (San Sebastian)
- Slam dunk contest: Niño Canaleta (UE)
- Three-point shootout: Chris Tiu (Ateneo)
- 2-ball competition: Patrick Cabahug and Leo Canuday (Adamson)

== 2005 ==
- All-star games:
  - UAAP (Adamson/FEU/NU/UE) 64-76 NCAA (JRU/PCU/San Sebastian/UPHDS)
    - All-star MVP: Leo Najorda (San Sebastian)
  - UAAP (Ateneo/La Salle/UP/UST) 81-88 NCAA (Letran/CSB/Mapua/San Beda)
    - All-star MVP: Boyet Bautista (Letran)
- Slam dunk contest: Rey Guevarra (Letran)
- Three-point shootout: Alex Angeles (San Beda)
- 2-ball competition: JB Sison and Jay-R Tecson (San Beda)

== 2006 ==
- All-star games:
  - UAAP Juniors 64-72 NCAA Juniors
    - All-star MVP: Dave Marcelo (San Beda)
  - UAAP Seniors 83-78 NCAA Seniors
    - All-star MVP: Jojo Duncil (UST)
- Slam dunk contest: Elmer Espiritu (UE)
- Three-point shootout: Chris Tiu (Ateneo)
- 2-ball competition: Jim Viray and Anthony del Rio (San Sebastian)

== 2007 ==
- All-star game UAAP 78-83 NCAA
  - All-star MVP: RJ Jazul (Letran)
- Slam dunk contest: Rey Guevarra (Letran)
- Three-point shootout: JV Casio (La Salle)
- 2-ball competition: Martin Reyes and Vicmel Epres (UP)

== 2008 ==
- UAAP Juniors 90-78 NCAA Juniors
  - All-star MVP: Mark Juruena (Adamson)
- All-star game UAAP 91-80 NCAA
  - All-star MVP: Jervy Cruz (UST)
- Slam dunk contest: Elmer Espiritu (UE)
- Three-point shootout: Clark Bautista (UST)

== 2009 ==
- NCAA Juniors 85-84 UAAP Juniors
  - All-star MVP: Arthur dela Cruz (San Beda)
- NCAA Seniors 76-60 UAAP Seniors
  - All-star MVP: Jimbo Aquino (San Sebastian)
- Slam dunk contest: Allein Maliksi (UST)
- Three-point shootout: John Wilson (JRU)
- Father-son 2-3 ball: Joel and Ael Banal

== 2010 ==
- NCAA Juniors 85-81 UAAP Juniors
  - All-star MVP: Baser Amer (San Beda)
- UAAP Seniors 90-76 NCAA Seniors
  - All-star MVP: Paul Lee (UE)
- Slam dunk contest: not held
- Three-point shootout: Nate Matute (JRU)
- Father-son 2-3 ball: Bong and Kiefer Ravena

== Standings ==
=== Schools ===
Team	W	L	PCT	Championships
FEU Tamaraws	3	0	1.000	1
Ateneo Blue Eagles	7	1	0.857	0
UE Red Warriors	10	2	0.833	1
UST Growling Tigers	3	1	0.750	0
San Sebastian Stags	4	5	0.444	0
Letran Knights	1	2	0.333	0
PCU Dolphins	1	3	0.250	0
Benilde Blazers	1	6	0.143	0
Adamson Soaring Falcons	0	1	0.000	0
Mapúa Cardinals	0	1	0.000	0
JRU Heavy Bombers	0	5	0.000	0

=== Leagues ===
Team	W	L
NCAA	8	7
UAAP	7	8
