= 2015 PBA Governors' Cup =

- Duration: May 5 – July 17, 2015
- TV partner(s): Local: Sports5; TV5; AksyonTV; Fox Sports; International: AksyonTV International

Finals
- Champions: San Miguel Beermen
- Runners-up: Alaska Aces

Awards
- Best Player: June Mar Fajardo (San Miguel Beermen)
- Best Import: Romeo Travis (Alaska Aces)
- Finals MVP: June Mar Fajardo (San Miguel Beermen)

PBA Governors' Cup chronology
- < 2014 2016 >

PBA conference chronology
- < 2015 Commissioner's 2015–16 Philippine >

The 2015 Philippine Basketball Association (PBA) Governors' Cup, also known as the 2015 PLDT Home TVolution-PBA Governors' Cup for sponsorship reasons, was the third and last conference of the 2014–15 PBA season. The tournament began on May 5, 2015 and ended on July 17, 2015. The tournament allows teams to hire foreign players or imports with a height limit of 6 ft 5 in (1.96 m) for the top eight teams of combined results of the Philippine Cup and Commissioner's Cup, while the bottom four teams will be allowed to hire imports with no height limit. The teams were allowed to hire an additional Asian import with a height limit of 6 ft 3 in (1.91 m).

== Format ==
The tournament format for this conference is as follows:

- Single-round robin eliminations; 11 games per team; Teams are then seeded by basis on win–loss records.
- Top eight teams will advance to the quarterfinals. Ties are broken among head-to-head records of the tied teams.
- Quarterfinals (higher seed with the twice-to-beat advantage):
  - QF1: #1 seed vs #8 seed
  - QF2: #2 seed vs #7 seed
  - QF3: #3 seed vs #6 seed
  - QF4: #4 seed vs #5 seed
- Semifinals (best-of-5 series):
  - SF1: QF1 vs. QF4 winners
  - SF2: QF2 vs. QF3 winners
- Finals (best-of-7 series)
  - Winners of the semifinals

== Elimination round ==
=== Team standings ===
Pos	Team	W	L	PCT	GB	Qualification
1	Alaska Aces	8	3	.727 (Note: Head-to-head record: Alaska 1–0 San Miguel)	—	Twice-to-beat in the quarterfinals
2	San Miguel Beermen	8	3	.727	—	Twice-to-beat in the quarterfinals
3	Rain or Shine Elasto Painters	7	4	.636 (Note: Head-to-head record: Rain or Shine 1–0 GlobalPort)	1	Twice-to-beat in the quarterfinals
4	GlobalPort Batang Pier	7	4	.636	1	Twice-to-beat in the quarterfinals
5	Star Hotshots	6	5	.545 (Note: Head-to-head record: Barako Bull 1–0 Star)	2	Twice-to-win in the quarterfinals
6	Barako Bull Energy	6	5	.545	2	Twice-to-win in the quarterfinals
7	Meralco Bolts	5	6	.455 (Note: Head-to-head quotient: Meralco 1.13, Barangay Ginebra 1.00, Kia 0.95, Talk 'N Text 0.93)	3	Twice-to-win in the quarterfinals
8	Barangay Ginebra San Miguel	5	6	.455	3	Twice-to-win in the quarterfinals
9	Kia Carnival	5	6	.455	3	
10	Talk 'N Text Tropang Texters	5	6	.455	3	
11	NLEX Road Warriors	3	8	.273	5	
12	Blackwater Elite	1	10	.091	7	

Source: PBA.ph

=== Schedule ===
Team ╲ Game	1	2	3	4	5	6	7	8	9	10	11
Alaska	BW	BGSM	ROS	TNT	SH	NLEX	KIA	MER	BBE	SMB	GP
Barako Bull	NLEX	BW	TNT	MER	SMB	ROS	GP	KIA	ALA	BGSM	SH
Barangay Ginebra	ALA	TNT	KIA	BW	ROS	SMB	GP	SH	MER	BBE	NLEX
Blackwater	ALA	GP	BBE	BGSM	KIA	MER	ROS	TNT	SMB	NLEX	SH
GlobalPort	MER	BW	SH	SMB	ROS	TNT	BGSM	BBE	NLEX	KIA	ALA
Kia	SMB	BGSM	NLEX	BW	SH	ALA	BBE	GP	ROS	TNT	MER
Meralco	GP	SMB	NLEX	SH	BBE	BW	TNT	ALA	BGSM	ROS	KIA
NLEX	BBE	SH	MER	KIA	TNT	ALA	SMB	ROS	GP	BW	BGSM
Rain or Shine	SMB	ALA	GP	BGSM	BBE	BW	TNT	NLEX	SH	KIA	MER
San Miguel	KIA	MER	ROS	GP	SH	BBE	BGSM	NLEX	TNT	BW	ALA
Star	NLEX	GP	MER	SMB	ALA	KIA	BGSM	ROS	TNT	BBE	BW
Talk 'N Text	BGSM	BBE	ALA	NLEX	GP	MER	ROS	SMB	BW	SH	KIA

= Win; = OT win; = Loss; = OT loss

=== Results ===
Team	ALA	BBE	BGSM	BW	GP	Kia	MER	NLEX	ROS	SMB	SH	TNT
Alaska		101–95	108–99	106–80	104–117*	101–63	89–75	102–113	94–93	82–77	92–86	103–104
Barako Bull			98–120	105–90	123–114	68–71	105–99	101–96	112–103	113–116	89–117	100–87
Brgy. Ginebra				77–83	111–108*	105–98	99–102	110–107	93–81	85–100	82–89	91–95
Blackwater					76–100	76–83**	72–87	89–102*	85–123	83–115	82–87	91–98
GlobalPort						102–94	92–73	108–80	112–119	102–124	91–89	123–120
Kia							88–85	85–82	90–94	83–78	80–89	85–94
Meralco								84–91	89–96	106–95*	83–81	119–85
NLEX									102–106	92–96	85–89	89–108
Rain or Shine										91–104	103–88	88–73
San Miguel											100–89	101–96
Star												105–93
Talk 'N Text												

Legend: Blue = left column team win; Red = top row team win.
Matches with lighter background shading were decided after overtime.

== Bracket ==
Quarterfinals (Top 4 twice-to-beat)
1	Alaska	114
8	Ginebra	108
4	GlobalPort	73	94
5	Star	126	101
2	San Miguel	99	102
7	Meralco	106	86
3	Rain or Shine	134**
6	Barako Bull	132

Semifinals (Best-of-5)
1	Alaska	3
5	Star	0
2	San Miguel	3
3	Rain or Shine	1

Finals (Best-of-7)
1	Alaska	0
2	San Miguel	4

*Game went into double overtime

== Quarterfinals ==
=== (1) Alaska vs. (8) Barangay Ginebra ===
June 26

Alaska Aces 114, Barangay Ginebra San Miguel 108
Alaska wins series in one game

Smart Araneta Coliseum, Quezon City

=== (2) San Miguel vs. (7) Meralco ===
June 27

San Miguel Beermen 99, Meralco Bolts 106

Smart Araneta Coliseum, Quezon City

June 29

San Miguel Beermen 102, Meralco Bolts 86
San Miguel wins series in two games

Smart Araneta Coliseum, Quezon City

=== (3) Rain or Shine vs. (6) Barako Bull ===
June 27

Rain or Shine Elasto Painters 134, Barako Bull Energy 132 (2OT)
Rain or Shine wins series in one game

Smart Araneta Coliseum, Quezon City

=== (4) GlobalPort vs. (5) Star ===
June 26

GlobalPort Batang Pier 73, Star Hotshots 126

Smart Araneta Coliseum, Quezon City

June 28

GlobalPort Batang Pier 94, Star Hotshots 101
Star wins series in two games

Smart Araneta Coliseum, Quezon City

== Semifinals ==
=== (1) Alaska vs. (5) Star ===
July 1

Alaska Aces 97, Star Hotshots 91

Smart Araneta Coliseum, Quezon City

July 3

Alaska Aces 95, Star Hotshots 74

Smart Araneta Coliseum, Quezon City

July 5

Alaska Aces 82, Star Hotshots 77
Alaska wins series, 3–0

Smart Araneta Coliseum, Quezon City

=== (2) San Miguel vs. (3) Rain or Shine ===
July 2

San Miguel Beermen 101, Rain or Shine Elasto Painters 95

Smart Araneta Coliseum, Quezon City

July 4

San Miguel Beermen 110, Rain or Shine Elasto Painters 113

Smart Araneta Coliseum, Quezon City

July 6

San Miguel Beermen 114, Rain or Shine Elasto Painters 108

Smart Araneta Coliseum, Quezon City

July 8

San Miguel Beermen 117, Rain or Shine Elasto Painters 110
San Miguel wins series, 3–1

Smart Araneta Coliseum, Quezon City

== Finals ==
July 10

Alaska Aces 78, San Miguel Beermen 108

Mall of Asia Arena, Pasay

July 12

Alaska Aces 95, San Miguel Beermen 103

Smart Araneta Coliseum, Quezon City

July 15

Alaska Aces 89, San Miguel Beermen 96

Smart Araneta Coliseum, Quezon City

July 17

Alaska Aces 81, San Miguel Beermen 91
San Miguel wins series, 4–0

Smart Araneta Coliseum, Quezon City

== Awards ==
=== Conference ===
- Best Player of the Conference: June Mar Fajardo (San Miguel Beermen)
- Best Import of the Conference: Romeo Travis (Alaska Aces)
- Finals MVP: June Mar Fajardo (San Miguel Beermen)

=== Players of the Week ===
Week	Player	Ref.
May 5–10	JC Intal (Barako Bull Energy)	
May 11–17	Dylan Ababou (Barako Bull Energy)	
May 18–24	Joseph Yeo (Barako Bull Energy)	
May 25–31	RR Garcia (Barako Bull Energy)	
June 1–7	Jeffrei Chan (Rain or Shine Elasto Painters)	
June 8–14	Terrence Romeo (GlobalPort Batang Pier)	
June 15–21	Paul Lee (Rain or Shine Elasto Painters)	
June 22–28	Peter June Simon (Star Hotshots)	
June 29 – July 5	Vic Manuel (Alaska Aces)	

== Imports ==
The following is the list of imports, which had played for their respective teams at least once, with the returning imports in italics. Highlighted in gold are the imports who stayed with their respective teams for the whole conference. Players with an asterisk indicates the Asian imports.

Team	Name	Debuted	Last game	Record
Alaska Aces	(United States) Romeo Travis	May 5 (vs. Blackwater)	July 17 (vs. San Miguel)	12–7
Barako Bull Energy	(Canada) Liam McMorrow	May 6 (vs. NLEX)	June 27 (vs. Rain or Shine)	6–6
Barangay Ginebra San Miguel	(United States) Orlando Johnson	May 8 (vs. Alaska)	June 26 (vs. Alaska)	5–7
Barangay Ginebra San Miguel	(Mongolia) Sanchir Tungalag*	May 8 (vs. Alaska)	May 31 (vs. San Miguel)	2–4
Barangay Ginebra San Miguel	(South Korea) Kim Jiwan*	June 3 (vs. GlobalPort)	June 26 (vs. Alaska)	3–3
Blackwater Elite	(United States) Marcus Douthit	May 5 (vs. Alaska)	June 3 (vs. Rain or Shine)	1–6
Blackwater Elite	(United States) Marcus Cousin	June 12 (vs. Talk 'N Text)	June 23 (vs. Star)	0–4
GlobalPort Batang Pier	(United States) Patrick O'Bryant	May 5 (vs. Meralco)	May 8 (vs. Blackwater)	2–0
GlobalPort Batang Pier	(United States) Steven Thomas	May 12 (vs. Star)	May 17 (vs. San Miguel)	1–1
GlobalPort Batang Pier	(United States) Jarrid Famous	May 22 (vs. Rain or Shine)	June 28 (vs. Star)	4–5
GlobalPort Batang Pier	(Palestine) Omar Krayem*	May 5 (vs. Meralco)	June 28 (vs. Star)	7–6
Kia Carnival	(Senegal) Hamady N'Diaye	May 6 (vs. San Miguel)	June 24 (vs. Meralco)	5–6
Kia Carnival	(Chinese Taipei) Chang Tsung-hsien*	May 6 (vs. San Miguel)	June 24 (vs. Meralco)	5–6
Meralco Bolts	(United States) Andre Emmett	May 5 (vs. GlobalPort)	June 29 (vs. San Miguel)	6–7
Meralco Bolts	(Japan) Seiya Ando*	May 13 (vs. NLEX)	June 29 (vs. San Miguel)	5–6
NLEX Road Warriors	(United States) Kwame Alexander	May 6 (vs. Barako Bull)	June 24 (vs. Barangay Ginebra)	3–8
NLEX Road Warriors	(Syria) Michael Madanly*	May 6 (vs. Barako Bull)	June 24 (vs. Barangay Ginebra)	3–8
Rain or Shine Elasto Painters	(United States) Wendell McKines	May 12 (vs. San Miguel)	July 8 (vs. San Miguel)	9–7
San Miguel Beermen	(United States) Arizona Reid	May 6 (vs. Kia)	July 17 (vs. Alaska)	16–5
Star Hotshots	(United States) Marqus Blakely	May 9 (vs. NLEX)	July 5 (vs. Alaska)	9–8
Talk 'N Text Tropang Texters	(United States) Steffphon Pettigrew	May 10 (vs. Barangay Ginebra)	June 19 (vs. Kia)	5–6
Talk 'N Text Tropang Texters	(Jordan) Sam Daghles*	May 10 (vs. Barangay Ginerba)	June 19 (vs. Kia)	5–6

=== Import handicapping ===
#	Team	Philippine Cup	Commissioner's Cup	Total	Import height limit
1	Rain or Shine Elasto Painters	1.8	0.4	2.2	6'5"
2	Talk 'N Text Tropang Texters	2.4	0.8	3.2	6'5"
3	Alaska Aces	1.2	2.4	3.6	6'5"
4	San Miguel Beermen	0.6	3.6	4.2	6'5"
5	Purefoods Star Hotshots	4.2	1.2	5.4	6'5"
6	Meralco Bolts	3.6	2.0	5.6	6'5"
7	Barangay Ginebra San Miguel	3.0	3.2	6.2	6'5"
8	NLEX Road Warriors	6.0	1.6	7.6	6'5"
9	Barako Bull Energy	5.4	2.8	8.2	Unlimited height
10	GlobalPort Batang Pier	4.8	4.0	8.8	Unlimited height
11	Kia Sorento/Carnival	6.6	4.4	11.0	Unlimited height
12	Blackwater Elite	7.2	4.8	12.0	Unlimited height

- Philippine Cup final ranking comprises 60% of the points, while the elimination round ranking in the Commissioner's Cup is 40%. The four teams with most points gets to have an import of unlimited height.
