= Kim Jiwan =

South Korean basketball player (born 1990)

No. 5 – Ulsan Hyundai Mobis Phoebus
- Position: Shooting guard
- League: Korean Basketball League

Personal information
- Born: June 2, 1990 (age 36) South Korea
- Listed height: 6 ft 2 in (1.88 m)
- Listed weight: 180 lb (82 kg)

Career information
- High school: Songdo
- College: Yonsei University
- KBL draft: 2012: 1st round, 6th overall pick
- Drafted by: Incheon ET-Land Elephants
- Playing career: 2012–present

Career history
- 2012–2020: Incheon ET-Land Elephants
- 2015: Barangay Ginebra San Miguel
- 2020–2023: Jeonju KCC Egis
- 2023–present: Ulsan Hyundai Mobis Phoebus

- Kim Jiwan
- Hangul: 김지완
- RR: Gim Jiwan
- MR: Kim Chiwan

Kim Jiwan (born June 2, 1990) is a South Korean professional basketball player currently playing for the Ulsan Hyundai Mobis Phoebus of the Korean Basketball League (KBL). He plays the shooting guard position.

== Professional career ==
In 2012, Kim was signed by Incheon ET-Land Elephants of the Korean Basketball League (KBL).

In late May 2015, Barangay Ginebra San Miguel of the Philippine Basketball Association (PBA) announced that Jiwan Kim would be their new Asian import replacing Sanchir Tungalag of Mongolia. He was being loaned to Barangay Ginebra by the Incheon ET Land Elephants of KBL to develop his game. He debuted in the PBA scoring 11 points, grabbing 5 rebounds, and dishing 3 assists thus making history by becoming the first South Korean professional basketball player to play in the PBA. After his stint in the Philippines, he returned to Korea.

== Professional career statistics ==
Legend
GP	Games played	MPG	Minutes per game	FG%	Field goal percentage
3P%	3-point field goal percentage	FT%	Free throw percentage	RPG	Rebounds per game
APG	Assists per game	SPG	Steals per game	BPG	Blocks per game
PPG	Points per game	**Bold**	Career high		Led the league

Correct as of November 2015

=== Season-by-season averages ===
Year	Team	League	GP	MPG	FG%	3P%	FT%	RPG	APG	SPG	BPG	PPG
2012–13	ET-Land Elephants	KBL	24	10.5	.449	**.389**	.474	0.75	1.54	.50	.00	2.50
2013–14	ET-Land Elephants	KBL	54	13.5	**.461**	.377	.600	1.04	1.31	.31	.04	2.78
2014–15	ET-Land Elephants	KBL	**55**	19.0	.425	.359	**.824**	1.87	2.24	.73	.07	5.09
2015	Brgy. Ginebra Kings	PBA	6	**27.7**	.426	.353	.750	**2.67**	**4.00**	.83	.00	**10.67**
2015–16	ET-Land Elephants	KBL	22	27.2	.403	.356	.708	1.82	3.82	**.86**	**.27**	7.45
