= Barangay Ginebra San Miguel =

Philippine professional basketball team

- 2025–26 Barangay Ginebra San Miguel season
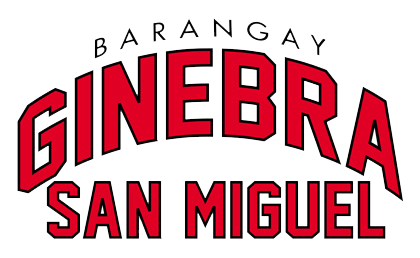
- Leagues: Philippine Basketball Association
- Founded: 1979
- History: List: Gilbey's Gin (1979–1981, 1982) St. George Whiskies (1981) Gilbey's Gin Gimlets (1983) Gilbey's Gin Tonics (1983–84) Ginebra San Miguel (1985–1988, 1991–1993, 1995–96, 1998) Añejo Rum 65ers (1988–1990) Tondeña 65 Rhum Masters (1994) Gordon's Gin Boars (1997–98) Barangay Ginebra Kings (1999–2012) Barangay Ginebra San Miguel (2012–present)
- Team colors: Red, black, white
- Company: Ginebra San Miguel
- Board governor: Alfrancis Chua
- Team manager: Alfrancis Chua; Raymond Rodriguez (assistant)
- Head coach: Tim Cone
- Team captain: RJ Abarrientos
- Ownership: Ramon S. Ang
- Championships: 16 championships List: 1986 Open 1988 All-Filipino 1988 PBA-IBA* 1991 First Conference 1997 Commissioner's 2004 Fiesta 2004–05 Philippine 2006–07 Philippine 2008 Fiesta 2016 Governors' 2017 Governors' 2018 Commissioner's 2019 Governors' 2020 Philippine 2021 Governors' 2022–23 Commissioner's 2026 Commissioner's 33 finals appearances (*) special championship
- Retired numbers: 2 (7, 8)
- Website: ginebra.com
Light	Dark

Barangay Ginebra San Miguel is a professional basketball team in the Philippine Basketball Association (PBA). It is owned by Ginebra San Miguel, Inc. (formerly, La Tondeña Distillers, Inc.), a subsidiary of the San Miguel Corporation (SMC), and is one of three PBA teams owned by SMC, along with the Magnolia Chicken Timplados Hotshots and the San Miguel Beermen. Regarded as the most popular team in the PBA, they are best known for their resilience and large fan following, as well as for their "Never Say Die" spirit. Barangay Ginebra has won 16 PBA championships, the second most overall behind the San Miguel Beermen.

La Tondeña, Inc. (renamed, La Tondeña Distillers, Inc., after SMC acquired majority control in 1987) joined the PBA in 1979 as an expansion team. After some rough times during their first few seasons, their fortunes changed when veterans Robert Jaworski and Francis Arnaiz arrived in 1984, following the disbandment of the famed Toyota Tamaraws. With new players like Jaworski being veterans of the game from ages 30–35, Jaworski would also be given the role as head coach of the young Ginebra team. As player-coach, Jaworski steered the franchise to four PBA titles between 1986 and 1997. After the retirement of Coach Jaworski at the age of 52, Jong Uichico, Siot Tanquingcen and Tim Cone would be coaching the players led by the legendary "Fast and The Furious", MVPs Jayjay Helterbrand and Mark Caguioa.

== History ==
=== 1979–1983: Gilbey's Gin/St. George Whiskies/Gilbey's Gin Gimlets ===
Joining the league in 1979, the team was known as Gilbey's Gin of then-owner and team founder Carlos G. Palanca, Jr.'s La Tondeña, Inc. franchise. Its first head coach was Pilo Pumaren and was bannered by MICAA standout Willie Tanduyan and imports Larry McNeill and Dean Tolson. Gilbey's managed to place fourth in the 1979 Invitational tournament.

In the 1980 season, Nemie Villegas took over as head coach. Willie Generalao won the Rookie of the Year honors during the 1980 season as Gilbey's placed fourth in the All-Filipino tournament.

The franchise played under the name St. George Whiskies during the 1981 Reinforced Filipino conference.

In 1982, playing again as Gilbey's Gin under new coach Arturo Valenzona, the Gins made its first finals appearance during the Open Conference. But they were swept by Toyota of coach Ed Ocampo, Robert Jaworski, and Ramon Fernandez.

Gilbey's made another finals appearance in the 1983 All-Filipino but were also swept by the Crispa Redmanizers in the first of three titles won by the Redmanizers.

=== 1984–1998: The Jaworski era ===
==== 1984: Gilbey's Gin Tonics ====
Before the 1984 season, Toyota announced its departure from the league after winning nine titles in nine seasons. As part of an agreement with new team Beer Hausen, the rights of the Toyota players were acquired by Beer Hausen. The team, owned by Lucio Tan, was entering its first year in the PBA. Jaworski, Francis Arnaiz, Arnie Tuadles and Chito Loyzaga refused to join Beer Hausen. The internal feud between Jaworski and Fernandez, which had been simmering for several years, became public. With this development, Gilbey's accepted Jaworski and Arnaiz; Tuadles and Loyzaga joined Great Taste; while the rest of the Toyota players, led by Fernandez, joined Beer Hausen. Jaworski and Arnaiz turned the moribund franchise into a competitive team almost overnight when in the first conference of the 1984 season, the All-Filipino Conference, they led the team to the finals against Crispa.

==== 1985–1988: Ginebra San Miguel and the birth of "Never-Say-Die" ====
By 1985, Gilbey's was renamed as Ginebra San Miguel. However, the team failed to enter the finals in each of the three conferences, showing only a strong finish in the Reinforced Conference. On October 22, 1985, in a game against Northern Cement (NCC), Jaworski was hit by an elbow from Jeff Moore late in the second quarter. He had to be brought to nearby Medical City's emergency room to get stitches on his lips. During the third quarter, NCC was leading when Jaworski returned to the bench.

The biggest manifestation was when, Jaworski came back from the nearby Medical City with seven stitches in his lip to lead the Gins to a come-from-behind victory against NCC. Jaworski incurred this from a wayward elbow inflicted by Jeff Moore in the second quarter. But with them behind by 15 points going into the final seven minutes of the game, Jaworski re-entered the court and sparked a frenzy that to date, has yet been matched. The NCC team simply froze upon the sight of the Big J and didn't know what hit them, eventually losing to the Gins.

Michael Hackett also saw his name in the PBA record books by scoring 103 points in Ginebra's 197–168 victory against Great Taste on November 21, 1985. This was later broken by Swift's Tony Harris in a 1992 game in Iloilo City ironically against Ginebra with 105 points.

Former Crispa import Billy Ray Bates was brought in for the 1986 Open Conference. Each PBA team was allowed to get two imports for the said conference. Bates' other partner was Michael Hackett, who was the 1985 Open Conference Best Import. It is believed that the pair was the greatest import tandem in PBA history. The two led the team in the finals of the tournament against Manila Beer (formerly Beer Hausen), with Abet Guidaben and imports Michael Young and Harold Keeling. Bates and Hackett powered Ginebra to a 4–1 win in the series to win the 1986 PBA Open Conference and give the team its first-ever championship.

Arnaiz suddenly left for the United States due to injury, but was still part of the line-up, before the team won its first championship, ending his 11-year career and tandem with Jaworski. He retired shortly afterwards the 1986 season.

==== 1988–1990: Añejo Rum 65 ====
In 1988, the team changed its name to Añejo Rum 65. The 65ers won the 1988 PBA All-Filipino Conference, their first All-Filipino championship and second overall title. They entered the finals via a classic playoff game vs. San Miguel. Joey Loyzaga made a perfect pass to Romulo Mamaril and made the game winning basket. Añejo took on new team Purefoods in the finals. Añejo won the series 3–1 over the young Purefoods team led by Jerry Codiñera, Alvin Patrimonio, and Jojo Lastimosa (who had a confrontation with Jaworski). During this time, Fernandez was benched by Purefoods for alleged game-fixing. In the final game, three 65ers scored 25 points or more – Joey Loyzaga, Dondon Ampalayo, and Sonny Jaworski – as the 65ers did not allow the then rookie-laden Purefoods team to gain confidence. The game was close all throughout until the final 3 minutes of the game when Loyzaga and Jaworski uncorked 3-pointers that iced the win. This team is known as the best All-Filipino underdog team ever to grabbed the All-Filipino Cup.

Añejo also clinched the 1988 PBA/IBA World Challenge Cup with Bobby Parks as their import by beating international teams and beating Alaska Air Force in the lone final game. In the season-ending Reinforced Conference wherein teams were allowed two imports each, Añejo again hired Billy Ray Bates and paired him with Kevin Gamble. Bates was beaten only after four games. The 65er would finish the season with the high-scoring duo of Joe Ward and Tommy Davis as imports.

On the next season, Añejo lost in five games to grand slam winning San Miguel Beermen in the Reinforced Conference. In that conference, the 65ers paraded another super import in Carlos Briggs, who easily won the Best Import Award. In 1990, Añejo entered the finals of the First Conference against Benjie Paras and the Shell Rimula X team. In Game Six, with Shell already leading the series 3–2, Añejo protested a foul on Rey Cuenco with a few minutes left in the second quarter. This led to the infamous walk out of Añejo. The team also complained about the unfavorable officiating as the team had more fouls than Shell. In the end, the game was forfeited and awarded the title to the Oilers. The result of this event gave the team a fine of more than 500,000 PHP which was then the highest fine in league history.

==== 1991–1996: Ginebra San Miguel/Tondeña Rhum 65 ====
In 1991, Añejo reverted to playing as Ginebra San Miguel. They met Shell again in the finals of the 1991 PBA First Conference. The Oilers goes up 3–1 in the series, needing only a win to clinch the series, but Shell blew a 3–1 lead as Ginebra managed a furious comeback to force a seventh game. In the final seconds of Game 7, an off-balanced shot by Rudy Distrito with a second remaining sealed Ginebra's third PBA title and completed the greatest comeback in PBA history.

Ginebra placed third in the 1992 Reinforced Conference. But at that time, the team was starting to fade.

In the 1993 pre-season, the Gins were given the second overall pick in the 1993 PBA draft behind new team Sta. Lucia Realty which replaced Presto. They drafted former FEU power forward Victor Pablo but immediately traded him to 7-Up for veterans Manny Victorino and Alejo Alolor. The said trade was lambasted by most fans, and it cost Ginebra their performance for the year where they compiled a 9–26 record in all three conferences. This horrible performance gave them the top pick in the next draft.

In 1994, in an effort to change their fortunes, the team was renamed Tondeña Rhum 65. The team selected Noli Locsin with their first pick, and was hoped to make team better. But Tondeña's struggles continued, winning just 12 of the 32 games that year.

In 1995, the team reverted again to Ginebra San Miguel. They selected 7′0″ center E.J. Feihl and also drafted Jaworski's son, Robert Jr. The drafting of Feihl surprised people. They were expecting Ginebra to either draft Kenneth Duremdes or Jeffrey Cariaso at that time. Jaworski later quoted, "It's not everyday that you see a 7-footer applying for the draft." Unfortunately, misfortunes still struck the team as Ginebra won only 5 of the 30 games played that year, capped by a 0–10 win–loss record during the Governors' Cup. The worst season triggered rumors that the Gins was disbanding. But the rumor was quickly killed off after the team posted a printed advertisement in major newspapers that they were staying in the PBA. Ginebra got the top pick again in the next draft. This was the last time a PBA team with the worst record was awarded the top pick in the draft. In the succeeding drafts, the worst PBA team had to compete with the second worst team via lottery to determine the top pick in the draft.

In 1996, the team used the top overall pick to draft controversial center Marlou Aquino from Adamson University. Aquino was a big star in the PBL for Nikon Home Appliances and Stag Pale Pilsen but was involved in a controversial scandal in terms of his academic status at Adamson, although this was later neglected when he jumped pro. Aquino showed the promise the fans of the team expected during the All-Filipino Conference. It also showed the discovery of former University of Santo Tomas guard Bal David as one of the team's popular players along with Vince Hizon, Jayvee Gayoso, and Pido Jarencio.

In the Commissioner's Cup, the team paraded NBA veteran Henry James as the team wound up in an elimination game against Formula Shell. But Kenny Redfield's buzzer-beating three enabled Shell to enter the finals. Ginebra finally entered the finals of the Governors' Cup but lost to the grand slam winning Alaska Milkmen in five games. Aquino's impact gave the team a 30-game improvement from a year ago and was named as the Rookie of the Year.

==== 1997–1998: Gordon's Gin Boars ====
In 1997, the team was renamed Gordon's Gin Boars. One of the most memorable shots in team history was Bal David's final second heave from half-court to defeat San Miguel Beer by two points. Gordon's Gin entered the finals of the All-Filipino against Purefoods Corned Beef. Purefoods managed to take a 3–1 series lead. In Game Five, they were about to score a winning basket after a Gordon's turnover. But Vince Hizon blocked Dindo Pumaren's layup, as the Boars lived another day. Unfortunately, in Game Six, the strong performance of Alvin Patrimonio and company denied Gordon's a title losing the series 4–2. The loss marked Jaworski's (player-coach) last game with the La Tondeña franchise and did not enter himself in a game since.

In the Commissioner's Cup, NBA veteran Chris King became a replacement in time for the semis of the tournament. Gordon's met sister-team San Miguel in an elimination semifinal match. It was a true classic game that went to double overtime. The Boars were down by five in the dying seconds of regulation then came back to tie the game and win it double overtime period. The Boars won, 106–100, in what is considered their longest playoff game to clinch the second finals berth. In the finals, Gordon's Gin eventually defeated Alaska in six games for the 1997 PBA Commissioner's Cup trophy, their first title in six years. This was their 4th over-all title and the last under Jaworski. Aquino was named Finals MVP. During this time, Jaworski thanked Gordon's fans for their support. Expectations were high for the Governors' Cup, but they were eliminated by Sta. Lucia in the quarterfinals.

==== Jaworski resigns ====
In 1998, Jaworski ran for a senatorial seat for the elections which he won by a lot of votes. This led to a conflict between Jaworski's role in the Senate and his role as coach of Ginebra (named during the Commissioner's Cup). Assistant Rino Salazar was named as interim coach at one point. Ginebra still struggled despite the addition of Bong Alvarez to the team. That year, Danding Cojuangco regained ownership of San Miguel Corporation. One of the moves the team made was adding Allan Caidic from San Miguel Beer. This caused a rift between Jaworski and the new SMC management because he was not informed of the move. In a press conference held at the Senate, Jaworski resigned as player-coach of the Gins. Jaworski was considered the oldest basketball player on any roster at 52 years of age during this time before he retired.

=== 1999: Renaming as the Barangay Ginebra Kings ===
In 1999, the team was then officially called Barangay Ginebra Kings. In the All-Filipino, the Barangay Ginebra Kings only managed to finish 8th in the eliminations, and needed to win twice against the first-seeded Mobiline Phone Pals and Asi Taulava in a "David and Goliath" elimination game. The Kings managed to force a knockout game, winning the first game. In the decider, the Kings came back from a 20-point deficit and David's off-balance game-winner resulted in one of the biggest upsets in league history to advance to the next round. Taulava was even seen crying in disappointment after the game when he failed to stop the smaller but quicker David. In the semis, they were eliminated by eventual champion Formula Shell that was marred by a scuffle in Game 2 of the series. A total of PhP 235,000 was slapped on 16 players and one official from both teams. Shell's Jay Mendoza was fined PhP 40,000, while Ginebra players Noli Locsin, Elmer Lago and Boy Valera were fined PhP 20,000 each.

=== 2000–2012: "The Fast and the Furious" era ===
In the 2000 off-season, Aquino was traded to Sta. Lucia Realty in exchange for Jun Limpot. The trade was considered as one of the biggest transactions done in the PBA. Another standout, Locsin, was later traded to Pop Cola during the Commissioner's Cup for Vergel Meneses, but it still didn't help the Kings throughout the season. Caidic replaced Salazar as head coach.

The Kings were eliminated early in the quarterfinals by Tanduay in the 2000 All-Filipino Cup, as well as the Commissioner's Cup. With Brian Green as import for the Governors' Cup, the Kings tried to repeat the same result of the 1999 All-Filipino against Mobiline. But this time though, the Phone Pals were able to beat Ginebra in the elimination game.

In 2001, the Kings drafted Mark Caguioa, a virtual unknown in the Philippines basketball scene. Despite that, Caguioa showed brilliance during the All-Filipino, earning his current nickname The Spark. The Kings finished fifth in the eliminations and faced Purefoods, who had a twice-to-beat advantage, in the quarterfinals. In a repeat of events the past two years, the Kings were able to defeat the TJ Hotdogs twice, after an off-balanced game-winner by Ronald Magtulis, to enter the semifinals. The Kings faced Shell in the semifinals, and Ginebra upset the top-seeded Turbo Chargers in five games to meet sister team San Miguel in the finals. The Kings trailed 0–2 but won the next two games to tie the series at 2–2. In the end though, the Beermen won the series in six games. The Kings' success in the All-Filipino were not duplicated in the Commissioner's and Governors' Cup, as they were eliminated in the quarterfinals.

After the season, the Kings acquired Eric Menk from Tanduay to solidify their frontline for the 2002 season. Unfortunately, Menk was loaned to the Philippine team and the Kings struggled throughout the Governors' and Commissioner's Cups, again failing to enter the semis. In the All-Filipino, Menk made his Barangay Ginebra debut but the team did not enter the quarterfinals.

Rommel Adducul finally made his PBA debut after his years with the Metropolitan Basketball Association. The Kings selected the former San Sebastian College - Recoletos Stag as the No. 2 pick in the 2003 draft. His addition though did not help Ginebra's fortune to change in the 29th season. In the All-Filipino Cup, they were eliminated by eventual champion Talk 'N Text in the quarterfinals. They also failed to qualify for the Invitational tournament, after being eliminated by eventual champion Alaska in the qualifying rounds. In the season ending Reinforced Conference, they were knocked out by then-sister team and eventual champion Coca-Cola in the quarterfinals.

==== 2004–05 season ====
In 2004, as the league made significant changes so did the team which made the Kings more competitive. Caidic was moved to the position of team manager and former San Miguel assistant coach Siot Tanquingcen became head coach. The team also traded Limpot and Rob Johnson to Purefoods for Andy Seigle and Rodney Santos via Sta. Lucia, which received a future 1st round pick. In the 2004–05 season, Caguioa, along with his backcourt partner Jayjay Helterbrand, formed a strong tandem, which ABC Sports dubbed "The Fast and The Furious". Their play enabled the Kings to win back-to-back championships.

During the conference, Tanquingcen used a three guard combination line-up of Santos, Helterbrand and Caguioa which enabled the team to have a running game. It was during this time that the backcourt tandem of Helterbrand and Caguioa became known as The Fast and The Furious in reference to their running game and to the movie of the same name. On July 7, 2004, the Kings ended a 7-year title drought when they defeated Red Bull Barako in a best-of-5 finals, 3–1, capturing the transition 2004 PBA Fiesta Conference.

During that time, Torraye Braggs was their import. It was considered a miracle as the team was not expected to make it far after being seeded just seventh after the classification rounds. In the elimination wildcard phase, they came back from a 21-point deficit to beat Sta. Lucia. In the quarterfinal round, they had a 2–1 record, enough to make it to the semifinals. In the best of three semifinals, they eventually survived Talk 'N Text in Game 3 on their way to the finals.

On February 11, 2005, the Kings proved that the last championship was not a fluke by winning the next conference, the 2004–05 PBA Philippine Cup, a conference without imports. They dethroned defending champion Talk 'N Text, 4–2, in a controversial best of seven series. Game One was forfeited in favor of Ginebra when Phone Pals center Taulava, who was ineligible to play, entered the game. His citizenship case was still on the Bureau of Immigration and Deportation. The Kings filed a protest prior to the start of Game One. Ginebra carried the momentum and went on to win the championship. This was the team's first back-to-back championships in franchise history.

==== 2005–06 season ====
The Kings' victory over Red Bull in the 2004 Fiesta Conference broke the flawless finals record of the Barakos. And it proved to be costly too, as Red Bull would go on to defeat Ginebra in the next three tournaments that would follow after the Kings' back-to-back championships, denying the Kings numerous chances to rewrite history.

In the 2005 PBA Fiesta Conference, the Kings had a chance to rewrite history by winning the last possible three conference championship grand slam. Unfortunately, obstacles such as import problems, injury to Helterbrand and the suspension of future MVP Menk due to citizenship issues, made the team struggle throughout the conference. They placed 9th out of 10 teams in the conference after being swept by Red Bull Barako in the best of 3 wildcard phase of the playoffs. Red Bull took 4th place after being defeated by eventual champion and sister team, San Miguel.

In the 2005–2006 Fiesta Conference, the Kings were seeded to the semifinals after winning the second seed playoff against Red Bull. Original import Sean Lampley was replaced in time for the playoffs, by former Auburn University standout Chris Porter, in order to strengthen Ginebra's quest to regain the Fiesta Conference title. But his addition was not enough to help the Kings reach the finals. They faced Red Bull again in the semifinals, and eventually lost in the series, 4–3. The Kings came back and tied the series, after being down 1–3. It was an emotional series, who were expecting for a repeat of the historic comeback made by the team during the 1991 First Conference. After the series, Tanquingcen apologized to the team's fans. It was also revealed that Caguioa was playing hurt and had a hamstring injury throughout the series. The Kings battled Air21 in the third place game but lost. In that game, a lackluster Ginebra team played, which was believed to be still emotionally down from their game 7 defeat. Red Bull eventually won the championship against Purefoods Chunkee in six games.

In the 2005–2006 Philippine Cup, the Kings finished with a 7–9 record in the classification. Being defending champions, they were considered as favorites to win the tournament. Unfortunately, injuries haunted the team as players began to fall one by one. Standouts Menk and Adducul and rotation players Santos and Seigle all suffered injuries during the conference. The Kings made a gallant stand in the wildcard phase as reserves Mark Macapagal, Allan Salangsang, Manny Ramos and Ervin Sotto stepped up their game. Ginebra took the sixth and final spot in the quarterfinals after defeating Air21 on June 4 with a 118–114 overtime victory as Caguioa recorded a career-high 45 points. However, the Kings still fell short as they were eliminated in the quarterfinals by Red Bull, 3–2. After the Kings led 2–1 in the series, the Barakos clinched the series by defeating the Kings by more than 25 points in the last two games. Red Bull went on to survive the Beermen in seven semis games, before being denied a grand slam themselves by the Giants.

==== 2006–07 season ====
In the off season, the Kings were involved in the controversial three-way-team trade with Coca-Cola and Air21. The first part of the trade saw the Express sending Ryan Bernardo and its 2007 and 2008 first-round draft picks to the Tigers for Rafi Reavis, Billy Mamaril and the rights to Rudy Hatfield. The second part sent Reavis, Mamaril and Hatfield's rights from the Express to the Kings for Kalani Ferreria, Aries Dimaunahan, Manny Ramos, and Ervin Sotto plus Ginebra's two second round draft picks that year and a future first-round pick. The third part was voided by former commissioner Noli Eala, which would have allowed the Express to regain its own 2007 and 2008 picks plus the Tigers' 2008 second round draft pick from Coke, in exchange for Ferreria and Ramos plus the second-round pick this year and the future first-round pick. Air21 and Coca-Cola submitted a revised version of that part of the trade and was approved by Eala.

Under the revised version, the Express would trade Ramos and Ferreria, plus two second-round picks acquired from San Miguel and Ginebra to the Tigers. The Tigers retained Air21's 2007 and 2008 first-round picks but traded away their 2008 and 2009 first-round picks. The trade was viewed by many within the league as a one-sided trade. It also speculated the rumors of Coca-Cola's possible disbandment from the league, which was denied in a statement released by the president of Coca-Cola Bottlers Philippines Inc.(CCBPI) and PBA board of governors for Coca-Cola.

Also, the coaching staff underwent a revamp with Jong Uichico, from sister team San Miguel Beer, taking over coaching duties from Tanquingcen. Tanquingcen became assistant coach, along with Art Dela Cruz and Juno Sauler. Dela Cruz is also from San Miguel, having served as assistant coach, while Sauler is a holdover from Tanquingcen's coaching staff. Uichico, Tanquincen, and Dela Cruz powered the Beermen in their late-1990s championship run and also helped win their 17th title.

As part of their preparations for the 2006-07 PBA season, the team competed in the 6th Shell Rimula Brunei Cup but failed to make it to the semis after losing close games. They started the PBA pre-season tournament with a 90–75 drubbing of Purefoods, but failed to advance to the pre-season finals due to an inferior 2–2 record.

Hatfield made a league comeback and signed with the Kings. Johnny Abarrientos followed suit two weeks before the start of the season.

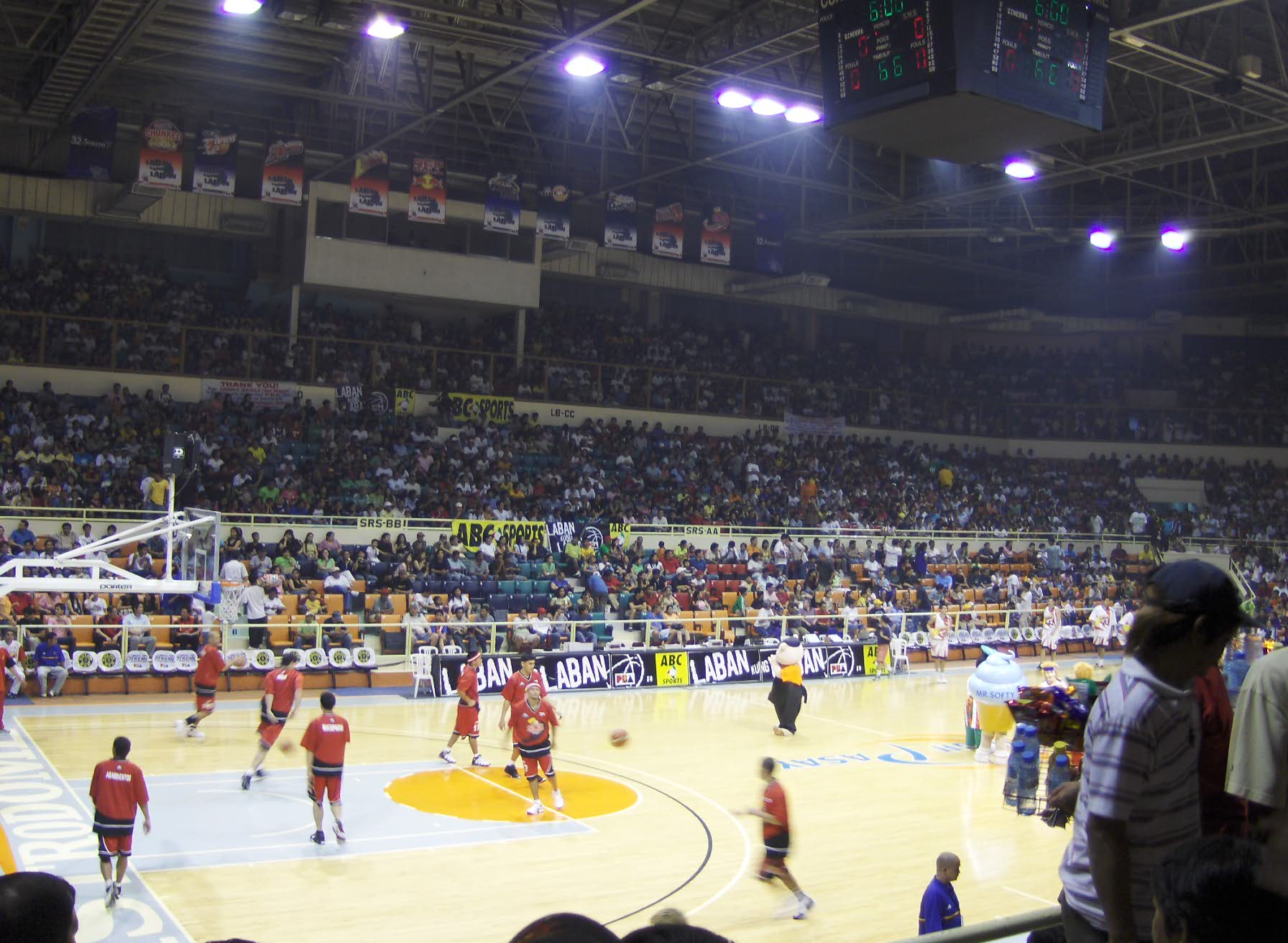
Ginebra prior to their game against San Miguel at the Cuneta Astrodome.

In the season opener, the Kings defeated the expansion team, Welcoat Dragons, 102–69, on October 1. Two victories over sister team Purefoods and Air21 gave Ginebra a good 3–0 start before being defeated by Red Bull on October 15.

Adducul was later sent to San Miguel as part of a three-team deal which involved Red Bull, a non-SMC club. Ironically, the following game saw the two sister teams face off at the Cuneta Astrodome, in a game which the Kings won in overtime, 101–97, after the Beermen led by as much as 20 points during regulation.

At the middle of the classification round, changes still happened to the team. The team acquired Ronald Tubid from the Air21. The team managers of the SMC teams were also shuffled. Ginebra's team manager, Caidic was replaced by Samboy Lim and he was sent to Coca-Cola.

The Kings advanced straight to the semifinals after becoming the no. 1 team at the end of the classification phase. In the semifinals series against Talk N' Text, they were able to win the crucial Game 5 after the series was tied 2–2, leading to the series clinching Game 6 win.

In the finals, the Kings faced San Miguel and fell behind 0–2 in the series similar to their 2001 showdown. But unlike in 2001, this time the outcome was different. The Kings would win the next four games, with games 3 and 4 being blowouts, to win the 2006-07 PBA Philippine Cup, becoming only the fifth PBA team to win the title after losing the first two games. It was a sweet revenge for the Kings as Helterbrand, who sank two crucial free throws in Game 6, was named Finals MVP. Caguioa also won the Best Player of the Conference award.

After winning the Philippine Cup, starters Caguioa, Helterbrand, and Menk were all loaned to play for the Philippine national team competing in the FIBA Asia Championship. They also lost Hatfield early in the first round due to personal problems, but their import Rod Nealy provided the scoring for the Kings. Despite a depleted lineup, they still managed to finish 12–6 as 3rd seed and earned an outright quarterfinals berth, mainly due to the strong play of Egay Echavez, Mark Macapagal and Gec Chia who shined in the absence of the starters. In the quarterfinals, they faced San Miguel, but ended the series differently. This time the Kings took Game 1 with a 113–87 victory but San Miguel took Game 2 and won an overtime thriller 117–114 in Game 3, thwarting the Kings' chance to win a second pair of back-to-back titles.

==== 2007–08 season ====
In the off-season, the Kings made few adjustments to their roster by trading Macapagal to Coca-Cola for guard Chris Pacana and Chia to Talk 'N Text for veteran Victor Pablo, who finally donned the Ginebra jersey 15 years after he was drafted. They also boosted their backcourt by drafting Macky Escalona from Ateneo and acquiring Paul Artadi from Air21 after being traded by Purefoods. They also added depth by getting Willy Wilson. Still, they lacked interior presence due to the loss of Hatfield and injuries to Rafi Reavis and Billy Mamaril. Despite having Helterbrand back in the lineup, they have yet returned to their competitive form because Caguioa got injured. They won the opening game against Red Bull but finished the eliminations 8–10. They ended up in the wildcard phase where they met Air21 and lose 119–110, ending its title defense.

After failing to defend their Philippine Cup crown, they signed Alex Crisano to supplement their front court and Rahshon Turner as their import for the 2008 PBA Fiesta Conference. Despite a different look, the Kings had a slow start losing their first five games with both Turner and Ernest Brown. To stop the losing streak, they replaced Brown with another recruit from the NBA Development League, Chris Alexander whose inside scoring and rebounding helped the Kings win 10 of their next 13 games in the eliminations. The Kings ended on a high note ending the eliminations 10–8 with an outright quarterfinals berth. They faced Sta. Lucia in the quarterfinals and completed a 2-game sweep en route to another showdown against Red Bull. In the semis, which everyone predicted to be a 7-game showdown saw the Kings sweep the Barakos that included a 101–97 overtime victory in Game 4. So convincingly was the sweep that they shamed Red Bull all throughout the series. After the last game of the series, the Barakos went all the way to their locker room without congratulating Barangay Ginebra. This gave Ginebra its first series sweep in franchise history, and its 17th finals appearance. This also gave Uichico his 12th finals appearance (second with Ginebra) and the third sweep in league history since the 1992 Third Conference when Swift swept 7-Up in the finals. The Game 4 victory extended their winning streak dating back from the eliminations to 12 (the longest in franchise history).

In the finals, they met the Air21 who sought to win its first franchise title. At the opener, the Kings extended their winning streak to 13 with a 105–96 victory. But in Game 2, Helterbrand injured his hamstring giving the momentum to the Express for a 124–90 rout, the worst loss of Uichico in his entire coaching career. As their injuries continued to pile up, they lost Game 3 and Helterbrand for the rest of the series. However, the Kings managed to tie the series with a 90–77 win in Game 4. Tubid also returned during Game 4 from a dislocated left ankle and lift the Kings, but lost a close 76–73 in Game 5. In Game 6, the Kings proved that they were more worthy of the title by extending the series to a Game 7 with an 80–75 victory, thanks to Alexander's 37 points (20 in the 3rd quarter) to lift the Kings despite an injury plagued lineup. In Game 7, with the injury suffered by Junthy Valenzuela (tendinitis) and Alexander having cramps in the third quarter, the locals led by Tubid and Menk had a terrific performance to maintain the lead and seal the 97–84 victory, and won the series 4–3 to grab their 8th championship. With the victory, they surpassed Purefoods in titles won. Tubid and Menk was named as co-Finals MVP. Uichico also won his 8th PBA title as a coach and his second with the Kings. A record crowd of 22,902 witness Kings’ coronation, the biggest in Araneta Coliseum since the legendary Crispa-Toyota days.

==== 2008–09 season ====
During the off season, the Kings went to the free-agent market to finalize their roster instead of signing undrafted rookies. Due to their aging and injured frontcourt, the Kings decided to fill their void at the forward position by signing the 6'6" former DLSU Archer Junjun Cabatu to a two-year contract. They defeated defending Philippine Cup champion Sta. Lucia and the team that they defeated in the previous season's 2008 PBA Fiesta Conference finals opponent, Air21. After winning the first two games, Ginebra then went on a 5-game losing streak before moving on the winners bracket with a victory over Coca-Cola. With a victory over Rain or Shine on Christmas Day, they finished the eliminations with a 10–8 card, and an outright berth to the quarterfinals. Then they faced a familiar foe, their sister squad San Miguel. And in Game 1, they lost a one-point thriller. The Kings exploded in game 2 even after losing an 18-point lead in the end game, they tied the series to one game a piece. In Game 3, the Kings were stream rolling with a 21-point lead only to lose the game and the series as the Beermen went on to face Talk 'N Text in the semifinals.

In preparation for the 2009 PBA Fiesta Conference and to fill up their injury plagued lineup, they acquired Chico Lanete (who was acquired by Air21 from Purefoods), Doug Kramer, and JC Intal from Air21 in exchange for their 2012 and 2013 draft picks. The Kings, though, lost big man Alex Crisano after deciding to let go of their center to Barako Bull Energy Boosters in exchange for a 2010 second round pick.

Comebacking import (2007 Fiesta Cup) Rod Nealy scored 42 points, 23 rebounds, 9 assists in his first game in the conference. After which, they fell to 2–5 before the Holy Week break and they sent Nealy home. While looking for the right import, they almost got one through former Los Angeles Clippers forward Ryan Humphrey but he exceeded the height limit of 6'6 (he was listed 6'8). After the break, they came back strong with a win over Rain or Shine 94–89 despite an All Filipino lineup. To beef up their lineup, they acquired Cyrus Baguio and Homer Se from the Burger King Whoppers in a 3-way trade including Purefoods. After weeks of trying to find an import, they finally signed former Milwaukee Bucks and Los Angeles Clippers swingman David Noel who was listed as 6'5" to further boost their depth as they try go deeper in the eliminations. Noel made an impressive debut with a triple double (22 pts, 17 rebs, 10 assts) in a 100–94 win over Burger King. Noel also displayed his athleticism by showing his high-flying skills in the 2009 PBA Slam Dunk Contest besting co-imports Gabe Freeman and Anthony Johnson to win the Imports category and Gabe Norwood to win it overall joining Paul Artadi who won the Obstacle Challenge earlier as the Kings won two of the three events. His dunks included a Michael Jordan rock the cradle dunk, a tossed windmill, and a backflip then 360 dunk that gave him a perfect 100 from the judges including US Ambassador Kristie Kenney, and due to the fans request, he did a familiar Julius Erving foul line takeoff to cap the contest. In the main event of the evening which is the All-star Game between the Powerade Team Pilipinas and the Import laced PBA All-stars, Noel again won the All-star game MVP as the All-stars defeated the Nationals 97–89.

As of this moment, the Kings are 8–1 with Noel as their import and they clinched a semifinal berth in the Conference along with the San Miguel Beermen as they pounded the Rain or Shine Elasto Painters 114–71.

The Kings were without high-scoring Mark Caguioa who was still recuperating from an injury in the United States. Caguioa, one of the prolific scorers in the league, did not play in the previous conference and his absence hurt the team's campaign. Junthy Valenzuela is also on the injured list.

==== 2009–10 season ====
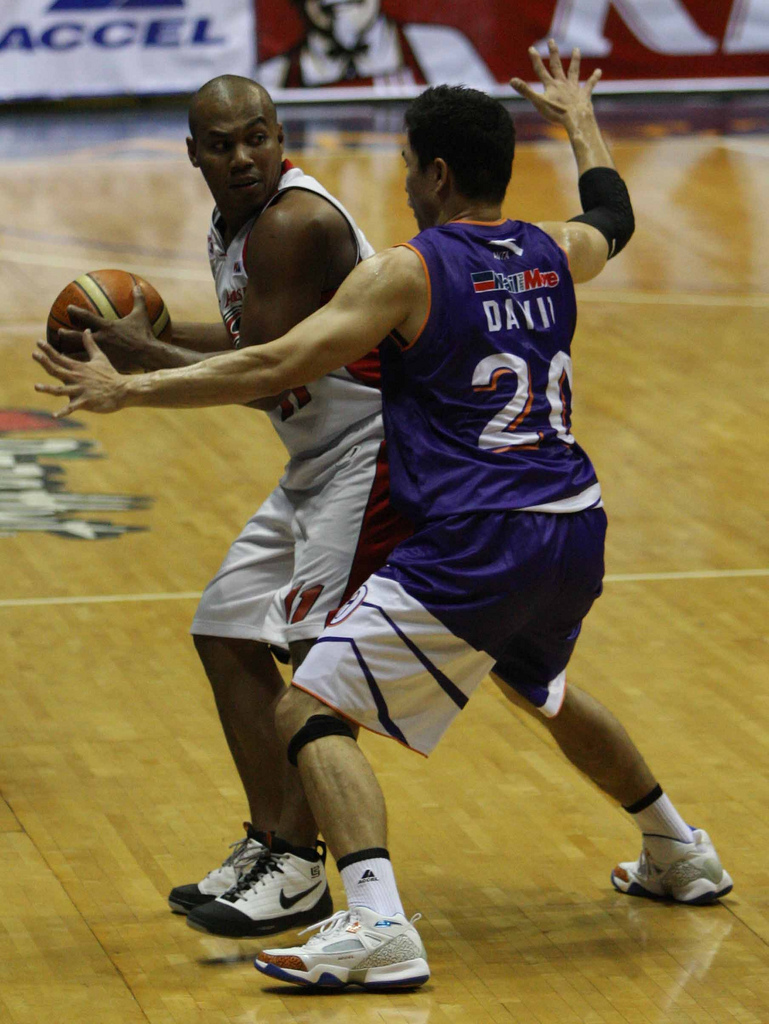
Willie Miller was traded to Ginebra in exchange of Cyrus Baguio.

In preparation for the 35th season, the Kings were included in a three-way trade with Burger King and Purefoods. They sent Paul Artadi, Rafi Reavis, and 8th draft pick Chris Timberlake to Purefoods for Enrico Villanueva, Rich Alvarez, Paolo Bugia, and Celino Cruz. They also traded their eighteenth draft pick Orlando Daroya to Burger King for Pocholo Villanueva, but Villanueva never made it to the team. Meanwhile, they released guard Macky Escalona, and forward J. R. Aquino to free-agency and waived center Homer Se. They also released guard Chris Pacana, who was later signed by the Sta. Lucia Realtors and placed forward Junjun Cabatu to the practice player list. On other reports, Ginebra coach Jong Uichico confirmed that they signed Eric Menk to a one-year contract extension for the Kings. It then released guard Chico Lanete and was later signed by the Burger King Whoppers. Prior to this release, they signed Talk 'N Text Tropang Texters 18th overall pick Kevin White to a one-year deal.

In the Fiesta Conference, Rudy Hatfield came back to the country and signed a one-year contract with Ginebra. During the mid-conference, Ginebra acquired Yancy de Ocampo and a 2010 second-round draft pick from the Burger King Whoppers in exchange for Rich Alvarez and Doug Kramer and acquired the former Metropolitan Basketball Association MVP, John Ferriols, who officially became an unrestricted free agent after being on the reserved list by the Alaska Aces. Due to lack of impressive point guards in their line-up, they traded high-flying Cyrus Baguio to the Alaska Aces and got the two-time MVP Willie Miller. Ginebra also traded Billy Mamaril to Air21 Express for Mike Cortez in the latter part of the conference.

The Kings' first import was Awvee Storey but he was then replaced by Mildon Ambres because of his inconsistencies. Ambres' performance was also not far from Storey's output; the team again made an import change. Denham Brown, a Seattle SuperSonics draftee, and a standout from the NBDL squad Iowa Energy, also struggled in five games when he played for the team during the last round of the eliminations.

The Kings looked for winning combinations with the new players in their lineup. But, they still failed to secure a playoff berth for the semifinals. Being tied with the Elasto Painters, they played for one-game playoff for the last quarterfinals berth. The result was, the Kings defeated Rain or Shine, 115–88, in the lopsided win. Barangay Ginebra then renewed its historic battle with fourth-seeded Alaska Aces in the quarterfinals. This was a rematch between the two teams that tangled in the semifinals of the 2009 Philippine Cup. Alaska took a 2–0 lead. Diamon Simpson powered his way to a 20–20 game in the first game and Barangay Ginebra as the Aces topped the Kings, 76–72, in the opener of this quarterfinals. In game 2 Alaska showed poise at crunch time. The Aces came up with big plays down the stretch while the Kings could not, enabling the Aces to escape with an 84–82 win. Simpson capped a 30-point game with his 17th rebound that sealed the game just before the final buzzer. Eric Menk and import Chris Daniels provided scoring but their backcourt were again invisible, with Mark Caguioa, Willie Miller, Mike Cortez, and Jayjay Helterbrand struggling in the game. In game 3 Ginebra came with a breakthrough win that fanned the hopes of the team. Not one but several Kings heeded the call and resulted in a 91–87 win over the Alaska Aces that kept the Kings' hope for the quarterfinals series. JC Intal, who came off the bench exploded for 20 points, delivering what Mark Caguioa and Wille Mller could not while providing both inspiration and boost to the team's cause of eluding Alaska's broom. The Kings forced a rubber match when they got balanced scoring from their roster with a 94–90 win over Alaska in Game 4. JC Intal and Ronald Tubid hit consecutive three-pointers in the final three minutes while Sunday Salvacion came through with the game-sealing free throws with 2.6 seconds left in Game 4. Ginebra failed to win the quarterfinal series with a heartbreaking 91–93 loss with Aces. In game 5, Tenorio drilled a difficult triple at the buzzer which seemed enough to propel the Aces to a victory and erected a six-point lead, 90–84, with just 2:15 left in the match. Willie Miller scored on a layup off a broken play as Ginebra cut the Alaska lead to four 90–86 with 1:27 to go in the game. Miller then followed up a missed layup by his teammate to push Ginebra even closer, 90–88, with 31 seconds left. Eric Menk then intercepted a long pass by Simpson, grabbing the ball at midcourt then zipped the ball over to an open Jayjay Helterbrand who drilled a three-pointer as the Kings pulled ahead of Alaska, 90–91, with 28 seconds left. But Ginebra, unable to pull a tough defensive play, when Diamon Simpson scored from underneath to push Alaska ahead for good, 92–91, with just 5 seconds left to play. Cyrus Baguio then double-teamed an attacking Eric Menk and stole the ball from Menk that finalized the score on a split from the line, 93–91.

==== 2010–11 season ====
Two-time Most Valuable Player Willie Miller signed a two-year contract with the Kings. Billy Mamaril then returned to the Kings after a stint with Air21 in exchange for a future draft pick. Three-time champion coach Siot Tanquingcen, rejoined the coaching staff of the Kings.

To start building its future, with 11 players who were age 30 and over, the Kings picked three rookies. They drafted 2009 NCAA season MVP John Wilson from Jose Rizal University and 2009 NCAA Finals MVP Jimbo Aquino from San Sebastian College in the first round and University of the East's Robert Labagala in the second round of the 2010 PBA draft. They also released Paolo Bugia, John Ferriols, Kevin White and Junjun Cabatu and traded Sunday Salvacion to Barako Bull for a future first round draft pick. They signed its three rookies after a week, giving Ginebra a mixture of youth and experienced backcourt. Wilson and Aquino were given similar two-year contracts worth P5.7 million, while Labagala got a one-year deal worth P800,000. On July 18, 2011, Miller was traded to Air21 in exchange for Niño Canaleta and a 2012 future draft pick.

==== 2011–2012 season: Last season as the Kings ====
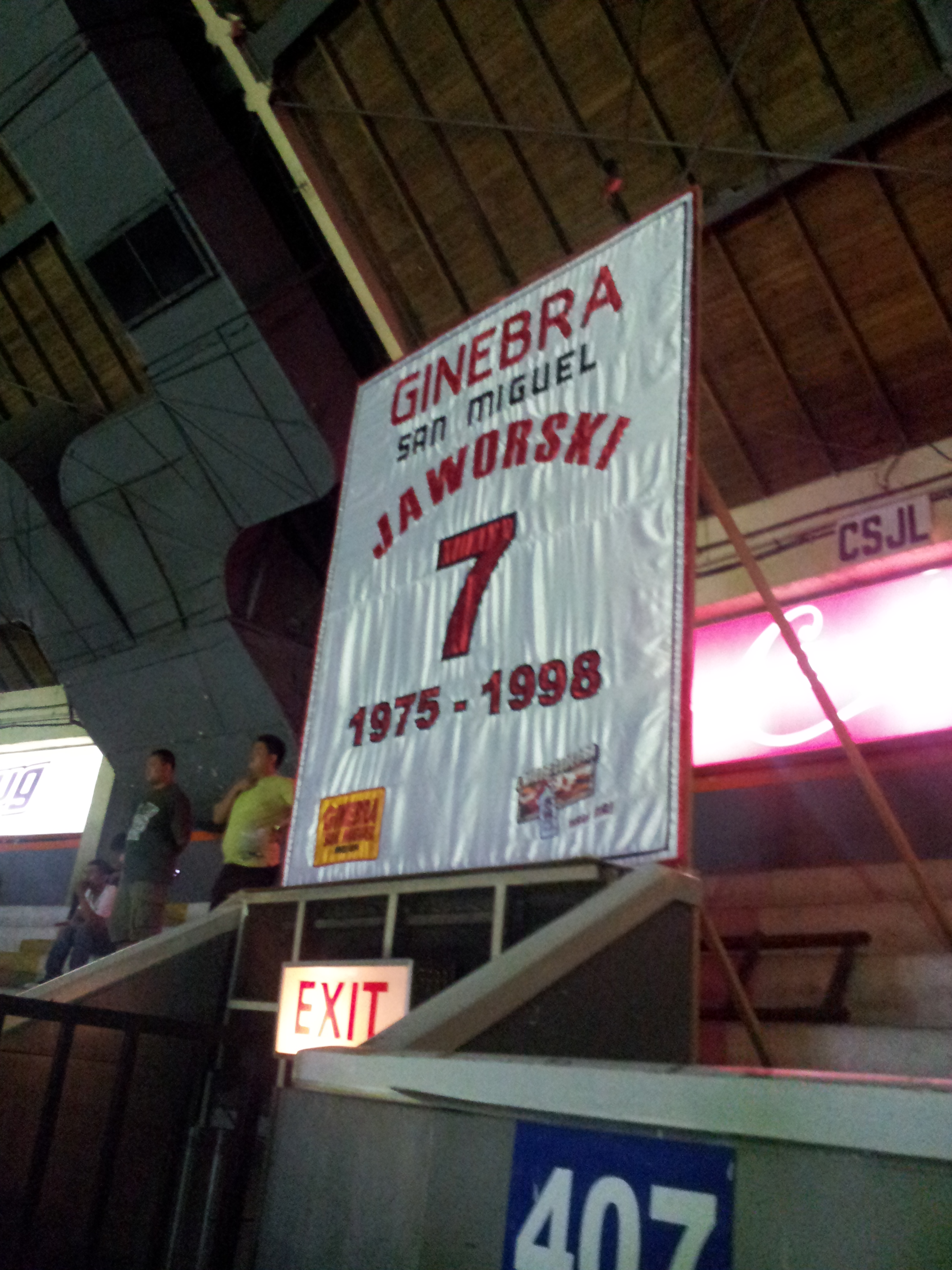
Robert Jaworski's retired jersey banner at the rafters of the Smart Araneta Coliseum during the retirement ceremonies.

After a lackluster previous season, assistant coach Tanquingcen was named co-head coach, alongside head coach Uichico. After the news that Hatfield left the Kings due to personal matters, the team selected Reil Cervantes and James Martinez in the 2011 PBA draft, but only kept Cervantes due to the guard heavy roster. Helterbrand signed only a one – conference contract extension, due to his desire to find out if he "still had it" and if he does not, he announced that he would retire after the conference.

The Kings drew flak that season for starting the younger, inexperienced guards such as Wilson and Labagala instead of holdovers Caguioa and Helterbrand, a move intended by Tanquingcen to speed up the development of the younger guns of Ginebra. Because of that, the Kings managed to barely escape two rival teams successively, as well as experience a two-game losing streak right after.

On November 16, the Philippine Basketball Association commissioner Chito Salud approved a trade that sent Allein Maliksi and former Rookie of the Year Rico Maierhofer to Ginebra, while Jimbo Aquino and 2013 1st round pick of Ginebra will be given to Barako Bull Energy, and 2002 1st overall pick Yancy de Ocampo and the 2012 2nd round pick of Ginebra will go to B-Meg Llamados.

The Kings finished fifth in the 2011–12 Philippine Cup eliminations with a 9–5 record. They entered the quarterfinals but they were defeated by Rain or Shine in a best-of-three series.

On January 11, 2012, Uichico resigned from the SMC basketball organization to become one of the assistant coaches of the Smart Gilas national team. On The same month, Ginebra acquired, Kerby Raymundo (from B-Meg) for JC Intal, and Dylan Ababou (from Barako Bull) for guard/forward Ronald Tubid and forward Cervantes. They also reacquired veteran Rudy Hatfield and brought back old import, Alexander in the 2012 Commissioner's Cup but after three games, the team replaced him with NBA veteran Jackson Vroman the team won the playoff for 2nd place in semifinals berth. Caguioa suffered a scary eye injury on that game. Ginebra failed to advance in finals, bowing to B-Meg in semifinal series (4–1).

In the season-ending Governors' Cup, Caguioa returned to play and wore a protective glasses during the game. The team hired import Cedric Bozeman, and led the team to semifinals round with 5–4 standing in the eliminations.

The conference was highlighted with the retirement of Robert Jaworski's jersey number 7 on July 8, before the semifinal game against Petron Blaze. However, the team failed again to advance in finals in a heartbreaking loss to the Llamados during the one-game playoff for the 2nd finals berth.

Caguioa was named Best Player of the Conference for the 2012 Commissioner's and Governors' Cup. He waited 11 years before finally winning the Most Valuable Player award, and Caguioa dedicated it to the people who never left his side.

=== 2012–present: Barangay Ginebra San Miguel ===
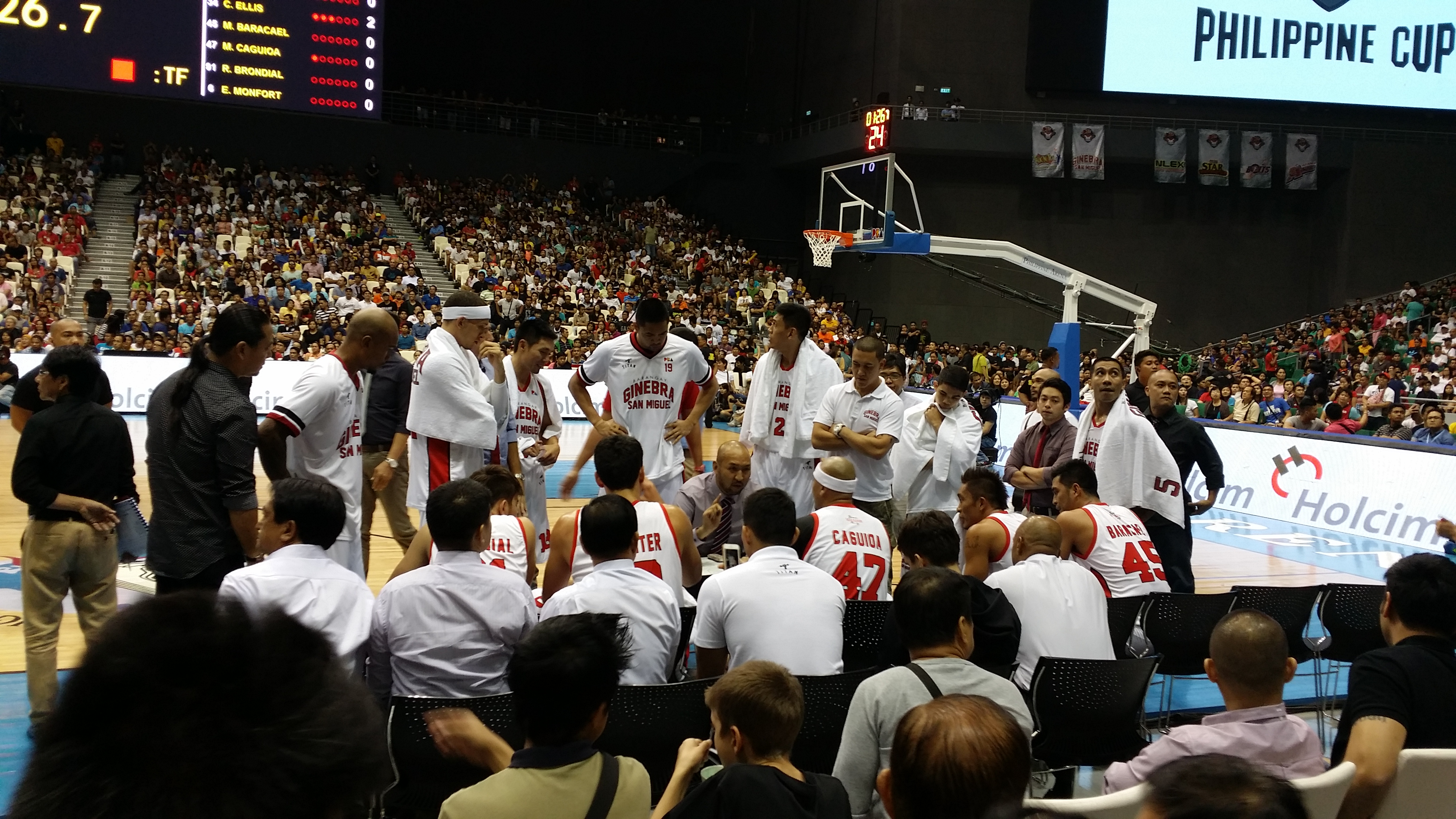
Barangay Ginebra during one of their timeouts. Photo was taken during the 2014–15 Philippine Cup, when Jeffrey Cariaso was still the head coach of the team.

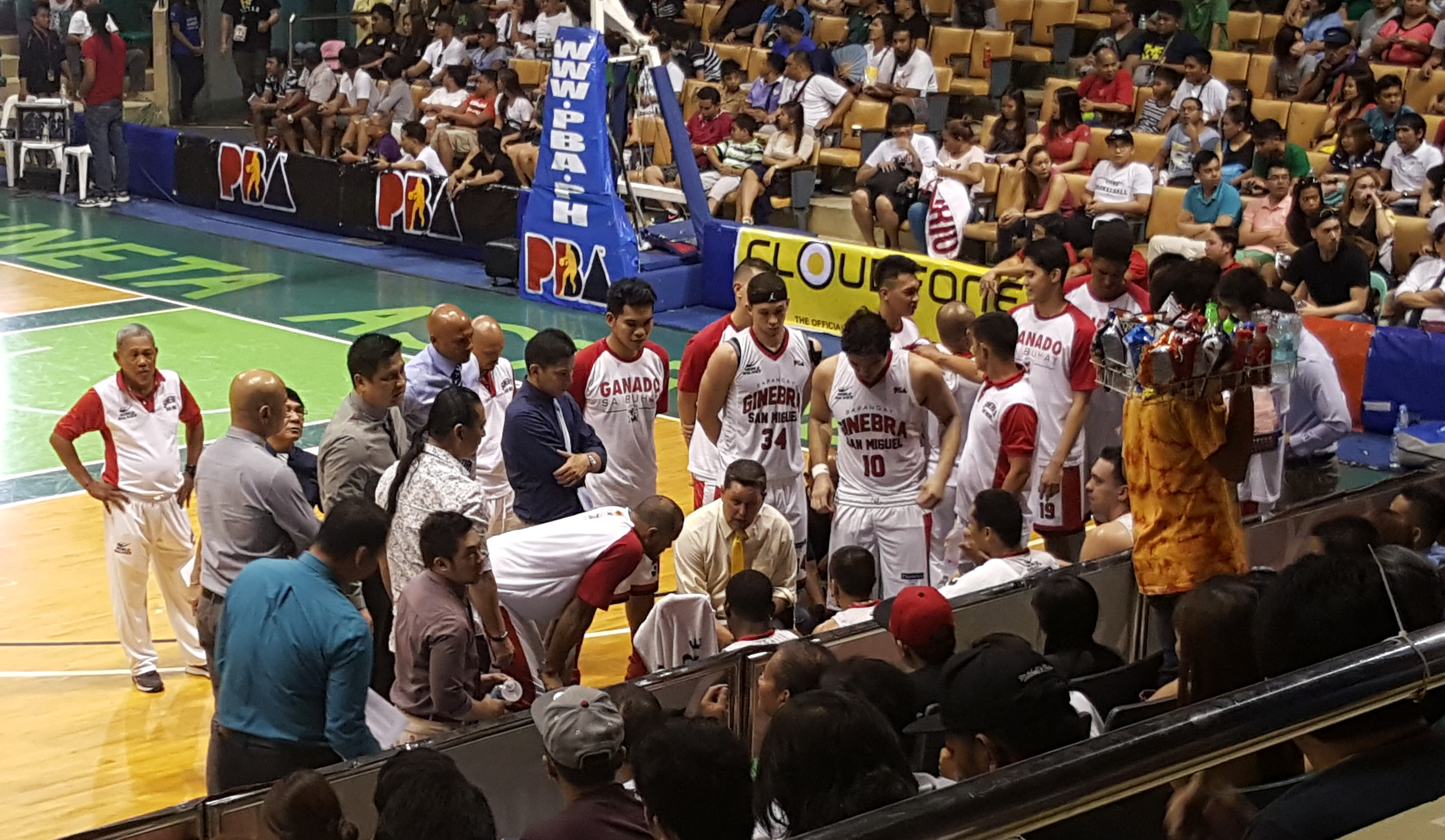
Barangay Ginebra's huddle during their 2016 Commissioner's Cup quarterfinal round game against Rain or Shine on April 17, 2016. Their head coach, Tim Cone, who took over as their head coach in 2015, can be seen in the middle.

For the 2012–13 PBA season, the team was named as Barangay Ginebra San Miguel.

==== 2012–2015: The arrival of LA Tenorio and pre-Cone years ====
On January 1, 2013, team consultant Alfrancis Chua was appointed head coach, while Siot Tanquingcen slid down to lead assistant coach for the 2012–13 PBA Philippine Cup. Chua was able to steer the team to the 2013 PBA Commissioner's Cup finals. They defeated the second seeded Rain or Shine in the quarterfinals from a twice to beat advantage. Import Vernon Macklin got two crucial freethrows in the last 12 second of the fourth quarter, despite poor free throw performance, to lead at 81–79. The Elasto Painters manage to set another chances, passing the ball to Jeff Chan who drives to the basket, but Macklin block it so quickly, with 7 seconds remaining they pass the ball to Paul Lee but missing the three-point line, Chan got the ball but also missing the layups as the time is over, Ginebra survive the game and will face against Talk 'N Text. After beating the Tropang Texters in the semifinals in five games but was eventually swept by Alaska in the best-of-five series. On July 16, 2013, newspapers reported that Chua "has reportedly resigned as head coach of Barangay Ginebra, announcing his decision to the players in their first practice session yesterday for the upcoming Governors' Cup. Online reports said that Chua decided to step down following disagreement with the management on the coaching shakeup and player movement during the conference break. On July 25, 2013, San Miguel Corporation announced that Ato Agustin shall take over as interim head coach, while Chua became team manager.

In the 2013–14 PBA Philippine Cup, they finished the eliminations with the first slot in semis. They also beat Alaska to advance in the quarterfinals. They faced their sister team, San Mig Super Coffee Mixers, in seemingly war of attrition, tying the semis at 3–3, but lost to the Mixers by 23 points. Before the start of the upcoming Governors' Cup, the annual Asian Basketball Showdown was held where Asian powerhouses will face against other Asian teams. Ginebra faced KBL powerhouse Changwon LG Sakers with Christopher Massie as import for Changwon LG. The game ended with an 81–76 loss to the Sakers. For the Governors' Cup, Barangay Ginebra paraded their import Orlando Johnson, a former Indiana Pacer. They also got the first Asian import Sanchir Tungalag, a Mongolian basketball star who was then replaced by guard Kim Jiwan. With those imports, they managed to place 8th. Ginebra extended the league best playoff appearance streak to 25 conferences. Kim and Tungalag became the first Korean and Mongolian reinforcements in the league, respectively.

==== 2015–present: The Tim Cone era and the arrival of Scottie Thompson ====
On July 20, 2015, San Miguel Corporation president Ramon Ang confirmed the appointment of Tim Cone as the new head coach of Barangay Ginebra San Miguel, starting in the 2015–16 edition of the Philippine Cup. On September 28, 2015, Ginebra traded Mac Baracael and Dorian Peña in a four team trade that landed Joe Devance to the Ginebra. In the 2016 Commissioner's Cup, the team tapped Othyus Jeffers, a former NBA veteran, as their import. During the Governors' Cup, the team signed Justin Brownlee, replacing the injured Paul Harris, as their import. They returned to the finals again after a hard-fought semifinals series against their sister team San Miguel to face Meralco, who also faced their sister team TNT. The series went up to Game 6, where Brownlee took the game-winning shot to capture the 2016 PBA Governors' Cup title that ended their eight-year drought dating back from 2008.

At the 2016-17 PBA Philippine Cup, Ginebra entered the playoffs as the #7 seed. They overcame a twice to beat disadvantage and defeated the Alaska Aces in the quarter finals to move on to the semis against sister team Star Hotshots. Despite being down 0–2 in the series, they were able to come back and win in 7 games, avenging their semifinals loss 3 years ago to make it to the Philippine Cup finals after 10 years against their other sister team and defending champions, the San Miguel Beermen. Ginebra was overmatched and lost the series in 5 games. For the 2017 PBA Commissioner's Cup, they brought back Justin Brownlee and ended up #1 in the standing after the eliminations. However, they got knocked out by TNT Katropa in the semis. And for the 2017 PBA Governors' Cup, they smashed the hopes of San Miguel Beermen for a rare grandslam as they blew them out in the quarterfinals. Then they won a hard-fought series against TNT Katropa in the semis to enter the finals and a chance to defend their championship. Waiting for Ginebra in the finals was the same team they defeated in the previous season, the Meralco Bolts. Barangay Ginebra went up 2–0 in the series, however Meralco was able to come back and tie the series. Ginebra won game 5 at the Philippine Arena to move 1 win away to defending their championship. But Meralco came out strong in game 6 to win the game in front of over 53 thousand fans in attendance. In game 7, the attendance was broken yet again at the Philippine Arena as over 54,000 fans trooped to watch Barangay Ginebra successfully defend their championship, winning 101–96 for their 1st title repeat in franchise history. A few days after their championship conquest, long time Ginebra fan favorite and legend Jayjay Helterbrand announced his retirement, thus ending "The Fast and The Furious" era of Barangay Ginebra.

Fresh off their 2017 Governors' Cup championship, Ginebra opened their 2017–18 Philippine Cup tournament by beating their rival Magnolia Hotshots (Formerly Star Hotshots) during Christmas Day for the 3rd straight year. Mark Caguioa paid tribute to his former backcourt partner and Ginebra legend Jayjay Helterbrand by changing his jersey number 47 to Jayjay's number 13 for the whole conference. Ginebra had a roller coaster elimination round and finished with a record 6–5 capped off with a triple overtime victory over Rain or Shine to gain the 4th seed. They met the Rain or Shine in the quarterfinals and swept them in 2 games. However they met their sister team, the defending champions San Miguel Beermen in the semis. Without their big man Greg Slaughter who is nursing an injury, the Beermen dismantled Ginebra in 5 games and went on to win the championship for the 4th straight year. Scottie Thompson recorded his 2nd career triple double in Game 5 of the semis. In the 2018 Commissioner's Cup, Ginebra donned a New Jersey with the words "GINEBRA AKO" for the conference. They also paraded import Charles Garcia while their resident import Justin Brownlee was still playing for the San Miguel Alab Pilipinas in the ABL. Ginebra had a slow start, having a 1–3 record before bringing back Brownlee who was fresh off a championship in ABL. They lost their first 2 games with Brownlee that brought their record down to 1–5 which put them on the brink of elimination. However they went on a furious 8 game winning streak that went all the way to the semifinals against Rain or Shine which they beat in 4 games to reach the Commissioner's Cup finals for the first time since 2013. They faced the defending champions, San Miguel Beermen. They split the series' first 4 games with blowout wins. Then on Game 5 with the series tied 2–2, Scottie Thompson scored clutch baskets to lift Ginebra to victory and put Ginebra one win away from the championship. On Game 6 at The Mall Of Asia Arena, it was a close game in the first half with the Beermen leading by 3. On the 3rd quarter, Ginebra blew the game wide open and never looked back as they went on to win the 2018 PBA Commissioner's Cup for the first time since 1997. Scottie Thompson was named the Finals MVP. Justin Brownlee also won the Best Import Award before the start of Game 4. The team's 2018 Governors' Cup campaign drew expectations for them to win the tournament as they topped the elimination round with a record of 9–2. However, their hopes of winning a three-peat in the tournament ended by losing in the semi-finals to their sister team, Magnolia Hotshots, who were eventually crowned champions by defeating the Alaska Aces in the said tournament.

Fresh from their semifinals defeat in the Governors' Cup, Ginebra won their first game of the 2018–19 PBA Philippine Cup, 90–79 against the TNT Katropa. Japeth Aguilar led the team with 21 points. Ginebra finished 3rd in the standings with a record of 7–4. But they got eliminated early in the quarterfinals against Magnolia Hotshots. Midway through the Commissioner's Cup, Ginebra was involved in the biggest trade of the season. They traded Sol Mercado, Kevin Ferrer and Jervy Cruz to Northport for star player Stanley Pringle. Ginebra also signed unrestricted free agent Jared Dillinger. They finished 4th in the standings with a record of 7–4. In the quarterfinals they got their revenge on their sister team Magnolia Hotshots by sweeping them in 2 games. However they lost to TNT Katropa in 4 games in the semifinals, failing to defend their championship. In the Governor's Cup conference, Ginebra finished 4th in the standings with a record of 7–4 just like the previous 2 conference. In the quarterfinals they had a twice to beat advantage where they faced grandslam seeking San Miguel Beermen who won both the Philippine Cup and Commissioners Cup, in a close game they defeated the Beermen and again crushed their grandslam hopes for the second time in 3 seasons. In the semifinals they were heavily favored to win against #8 seed Northport and they finished them off in 4 games, winning the series 3–1. Ginebra makes the 2019 PBA Governors' Cup finals for the 3rd time in 4 years. In the finals they met Meralco Bolts again for the 3rd time. The series was highly expected to be a long series as Meralco is now a stronger team. They split games 1 and 2, and in game 3 Meralco bigman Raymond Almazan got injured and never returned to the game, Ginebra took advantage and won the game. Meralco was never the same after losing Almazan and Ginebra quickly capitalized on the situation and won games 4 and 5 to win the series and their 3rd Governor's Cup championship in 4 years. Japeth Aguilar was named Finals MVP.

The 2020 PBA Philippine Cup opened its season in March 8 but after 3 days, the season was suspended due to the COVID-19 Pandemic. The season resumed inside a bubble on October 11 in Clark Pampanga. Ginebra opened their tourney with 4 straight victories before losing 2 straight games and finished the eliminations as the number 1 seed with a record of 8–3 to gain a twice to beat advantage in the quarter finals. In the quarter finals they beat Rain or Shine to enter the semifinals against Meralco Bolts, who eliminated the reigning champions San Miguel Beermen. They beat the Bolts in 5 games, capped off with a buzzer beating 3 points by Scottie Thompson to enter the finals for the second straight conference against TNT Tropang Giga. In the finals, they won Game 1 in overtime in a tightly close game. They followed it up by beating TNT again in Game 2 to go up 2–0. Coming back from a 15 points deficit in the 3rd quarter, TNT was without their star player Ray Parks Jr. who injured his calf in Game 1. TNT bounced back in Game 3 as they blew out the Kings. In Game 4 Ginebra took control of the game from start up to the last few minutes of the game where TNT came back after being down by 18 in the 4th but guard LA Tenorio was able to hold TNT with his timely 3 pointers to go up 3–1. In Game 5, TNT was without their leader Jayson Castro who got injured in Game 4. It was a tightly close game all throughout in which Ginebra finally took the victory led by Japeth Aguilar who scored 32 points. Barangay Ginebra won their first Philippine Cup Championship after 13 years and also their first back to back conference championship in 15 years. LA Tenorio was named Finals MVP and Coach Tim Cone became Ginebra's winningest coach with 5 championships, surpassing the legendary Robert Jaworski.

Ginebra struggled in the 2021 PBA Philippine Cup as they tied with Phoenix Super LPG Fuel Masters at the 8th spot in the elimination round. Ginebra's chance for a title defense was still alive when they won the 8th-seed playoff game against the Phoenix to gain the last slot on the Quarterfinals. Unfortunately, their title hopes for repeat were squashed as they were defeated in the quarterfinals by the 2020 PBA Philippine Cup runner-ups, the TNT Tropang Giga. TNT were eventually crowned champions. Coach Tim Cone took the blame for their title repeat failure but promised that it wouldn't happen again. Another title repeat was in the line for Ginebra as they were the champions in the 2019 PBA Governors' Cup. Justin Brownlee returned as their import for the 2021 PBA Governors' Cup. They got a hot start in the elimination round, but they struggled due to the injuries of key players Aljon Mariano and Stanley Pringle. Their key acquisition for this conference was John Pinto, who declined his contract extension offered by the Meralco Bolts and signed with Ginebra as an unrestricted free agent. Ginebra regained its composure in the final games of the elimination round. They finished as the 6th seed in the quarterfinals after defeating the Rain or Shine Elasto Painters in the last game. After clinching the 6th seed, Ginebra faced another familiar foe and set up another quarterfinals rematch with TNT. Ginebra managed to overcome the twice-to-win disadvantage against TNT to book a semis match against the NLEX Road Warriors. Ginebra's hot winning streak continued until the semis, but they've lost Japeth Aguilar for multiple games due to a strained calf injury. Even without Aguilar, they defeated NLEX in a Best-of-5 Semifinals series, 3–1. They booked another finals rematch against the Meralco for the fourth time since the 2016 PBA Governors' Cup. Ginebra successfully defended their Governors' Cup title as they defeated Meralco, 4–2 in a Best-of-7 finals series. Justin Brownlee was awarded as the Best Import while Scottie Thompson was awarded as the Best Player of the Conference and the Finals MVP in that conference.

== Legacy ==
- Gary Granada, a well-known composer and singer in the Philippines, composed numerous songs about the Kings; "Ginebrang Ginebra", "Kapag Nananalo ang Ginebra" (When Ginebra Wins) sung by Bayang Barrios, Pag Natatalo ang Ginebra (When Ginebra Loses), sung by himself. A different rendition of the song was made when Gordon's Gin won the 1997 PBA Commissioner's Cup finals entitled "'Nang Maging Champion ang Ginebra". The song was revived by Maria Gracia Gonzales, a Barangay Ginebra fan and updated its lyrics, drawing inspiration from the team's victory in Game 2 of the 2016 Governors' Cup finals. A video was posted by Gonzales in her Facebook account and garnered more than 800,000 views, 19,000 likes and 33,000 shares. She also performed the song during halftime of Game 5 of the championship series.

== Current roster ==
Barangay Ginebra San Miguel roster
Players
Coaches

Pos.	#	POB	Name	Height	Weight	DOB (YYYY–MM–DD)	From
F/C	1	(Philippines)	Troy Rosario	6 ft 7 in (2.01 m)	218 lb (99 kg)	1992–01–20	National-U
G/F	2	(United States)	Jeremiah Gray	6 ft 5 in (1.96 m)	205 lb (93 kg)	1996–08–16	Dominican (CA)
F	3	(United States)	Jordan Murphy (GI)	6 ft 6 in (1.98 m)	250 lb (113 kg)	1997–02–28	Minnesota
G	4	(Philippines)	RJ Abarrientos	5 ft 11 in (1.80 m)	174 lb (79 kg)	1999–09–14	Far Eastern
G	9	(Philippines)	Scottie Thompson	6 ft 1 in (1.85 m)	180 lb (82 kg)	1993–07–12	UPHSD
G	10	(Philippines)	John Pinto	5 ft 11 in (1.80 m)	170 lb (77 kg)	1990–10–15	Arellano
C	11	(Philippines)	Isaac Go	6 ft 7 in (2.01 m)	230 lb (104 kg)	1996–06–07	Ateneo
G/F	14	(United States)	Stephen Holt	6 ft 4 in (1.93 m)	195 lb (88 kg)	1991–12–06	Saint Mary's
F	18	(Philippines)	Ralph Cu	6 ft 4 in (1.93 m)	210 lb (95 kg)	1997–03–08	De La Salle
F	22	(Philippines)	John Abis (R)	6 ft 3 in (1.91 m)	209 lb (95 kg)	2000–10–14	UPHSD
F/C	23	(Philippines)	Raymond Aguilar	6 ft 4 in (1.93 m)	200 lb (91 kg)	1985–07–27	National-U
G/F	24	(Philippines)	Jayson David (injured)	6 ft 3 in (1.91 m)	191 lb (87 kg)	1996–11–08	Lyceum
C	25	(Philippines)	Japeth Aguilar	6 ft 9 in (2.06 m)	235 lb (107 kg)	1987–01–25	Western Kentucky
F/C	29	(Canada)	Norbert Torres	6 ft 6 in (1.98 m)	250 lb (113 kg)	1990–01–12	De La Salle
F	32	(United States)	Justin Brownlee (injured) (GI)	6 ft 6 in (1.98 m)	220 lb (100 kg)	1988–04–23	St. John's
F/C	33	(Philippines)	Kemark Cariño	6 ft 9 in (2.06 m)	203 lb (92 kg)	1998–02–01	San Beda
F	34	(Philippines)	Sonny Estil (R)	6 ft 3 in (1.91 m)		2001–06–28	Letran

Head coach

- (United States) Tim Cone

Assistant coach(es)

- (Philippines) Richard del Rosario (1st assistant)
- (Philippines) Johnny Abarrientos
- (Philippines) Jamil Lipae
- (Philippines) Patrick Partosa
- (Philippines) Olsen Racela

Team manager

- (Philippines) Alfrancis Chua^{[a]}
- (Philippines) Raymond Rodriguez (assistant)

Legend

- (C) Team captain
- (CI) Commissioner's Cup Import
- (GI) Governors' Cup Import
- (EI) EASL Import
- (DP) Unsigned draft pick
- (FA) Free agent
- (IN) Inactive
- (S) Suspended
- (R) Rookie
- Injured

Roster

- ^{a} Also serves as Barangay Ginebra's board governor.

== Season-by-season records ==
List of the last five conferences completed by the Barangay Ginebra franchise. For the full-season history, see List of Barangay Ginebra San Miguel seasons.

Note: GP = Games played, W = Wins, L = Losses, W–L% = Winning percentage

Season	Conference	GP	W	L	W–L%	Finish	Playoffs
2024–25	Governors'	10	6	4	.600	3rd (Group B)	Lost in finals vs. TNT, 2–4
2024–25	Commissioner's	12	8	4	.667	4th	Lost in finals vs. TNT, 3–4
2024–25	Philippine	11	8	3	.727	4th	Lost in semifinals vs. San Miguel, 3–4
2025–26	Philippine	11	7	4	.636	5th	Lost in semifinals vs. San Miguel, 2–4
2025–26	Commissioner's	12	9	3	.750	2nd	PBA champions, won vs. TNT, 4–3
An asterisk (*) indicates one-game playoff; two asterisks (**) indicate team with twice-to-beat advantage

== Awards ==
=== Individual awards ===
PBA Most Valuable Player	PBA Finals MVP	PBA Best Player of the Conference
Eric Menk – 2004–05; Jayjay Helterbrand – 2008–09; Mark Caguioa – 2011–12; Scottie Thompson – 2021	Marlou Aquino – 1997 Commissioner's; Eric Menk – 2004 Fiesta, 2004–05 Philippine, 2007–08 Fiesta; Jayjay Helterbrand – 2006–07 Philippine; Ronald Tubid – 2007–08 Fiesta; LA Tenorio – 2015–16 Governors', 2016–17 Governors', 2020 Philippine; Scottie Thompson – 2017–18 Commissioner's, 2021 Governors', 2026 Commissioner's; Japeth Aguilar – 2019 Governors'; Christian Standhardinger – 2022–23 Commissioner's	Marlou Aquino – 1996 Governors'; Eric Menk – 2004 Fiesta, 2004–05 Philippine; Mark Caguioa – 2006–07 Philippine, 2011–12 Commissioner's, 2011–12 Governors'; Jayjay Helterbrand – 2007–08 Fiesta, 2008–09 Fiesta; LA Tenorio – 2012–13 Commissioner's; Greg Slaughter – 2016–17 Governors'; Stanley Pringle – 2020 Philippine; Scottie Thompson – 2021 Governors', 2022–23 Commissioner's; Christian Standhardinger – 2023 Governors'; RJ Abarrientos – 2026 Commissioner's
PBA Rookie of the Year Award	PBA All-Defensive Team	PBA Mythical First Team
Willie Generalao – 1980; Dondon Ampalayo – 1986; Marlou Aquino – 1996; Mark Caguioa – 2001; Greg Slaughter – 2013–14; RJ Abarrientos – 2024–25	Robert Jaworski Sr. – 1985, 1988; Chito Loyzaga – 1985–1992; Marlou Aquino – 1996–1997; Ronald Tubid – 2008–09; Billy Mamaril – 2008–09; John Wilson – 2010–11; Willy Wilson – 2010–11; Japeth Aguilar – 2015–17; Christian Standhardinger – 2022–23; Stephen Holt – 2024–25	Robert Jaworski Sr. – 1986; Marlou Aquino – 1996–1997; Vince Hizon – 1997; Eric Menk – 2004–05; Jayjay Helterbrand – 2007–08, 2008–09; Mark Caguioa – 2007–08, 2010–11, 2011–12; LA Tenorio – 2012–13; Greg Slaughter – 2014–15; Japeth Aguilar – 2016–17, 2017–18, 2020; Stanley Pringle – 2020; Scottie Thompson – 2021, 2022–23; Christian Standhardinger – 2022–23, 2023–24; Jamie Malonzo – 2022–23
PBA Mythical Second Team	PBA Most Improved Player	PBA Sportsmanship Award
Terry Saldaña – 1984, 1986; Robert Jaworski Sr. – 1985, 1988; Chito Loyzaga – 1986; Dondon Ampalayo – 1986, 1988; Rudy Distrito – 1990; Rey Cuenco – 1990; Bal David – 1996; Noli Locsin – 1996–1997; Mark Caguioa – 2004–06; Rommel Adducul – 2004–05; Greg Slaughter – 2013–14; LA Tenorio – 2015–17; Japeth Aguilar – 2015–16, 2019, 2024–25; Joe Devance – 2016–17; Scottie Thompson – 2017–18, 2024–25; Stanley Pringle – 2019; Christian Standhardinger – 2021	Terry Saldaña – 1983; Dante Gonzalgo – 1989; Rey Cuenco – 1990; Pido Jarencio – 1992; Elmer Lago – 1999; Scottie Thompson – 2017–18; Prince Caperal – 2020	Scottie Thompson – 2020
PBA Best Import
Michael Hackett – 1985 Reinforced; Jamie Waller – 1988 Open; Carlos Briggs – 1989 Reinforced; Wes Matthews – 1991 Third; Chris Alexander – 2007–08 Fiesta; Nate Brumfield – 2010–11 Commissioner's; Justin Brownlee – 2018 Commissioner's, 2021 Governors', 2022–23 Commissioner's, 2026 Commissioner's

=== PBA Press Corps Individual Awards ===
Executive of the Year	Baby Dalupan Coach of the Year	Defensive Player of the Year
Henry Cojuangco – 2004–05; Ramon Ang – 2013–14, 2016–17; Alfrancis Chua – 2017–18, 2021, 2023–24	Siot Tanquingcen – 2004–05; Jong Uichico – 2006–07; Tim Cone – 2020, 2022–23	Marlou Aquino – 1996
Bogs Adornado Comeback Player of the Year	Mr. Quality Minutes	All-Rookie Team
Jayjay Helterbrand – 2004–05; Mark Caguioa – 2011–12; LA Tenorio - 2023–24	Mark Caguioa – 2001	John Wilson- 2010–11; Rob Labagala – 2010–11; Dylan Ababou – 2011–12; Greg Slaughter – 2013–14; Scottie Thompson – 2015–16; Kevin Ferrer – 2016–17; Arvin Tolentino – 2020; RJ Abarrientos – 2024–25
Lifetime Achievement Award	President's Award	
Robert Jaworski - 2023–24	Tim Cone - 2023–24	

=== All-Star Weekend ===
All Star MVP	Obstacle Challenge
Bal David – 1997; Vergel Meneses – 2000; Jayjay Helterbrand – 2005, 2007; David Noel – 2009; Japeth Aguilar – 2019, 2024, 2026	Bal David – 1999; Edward Naron – 2000; Jayjay Helterbrand – 2001; Paul Artadi – 2009
Slam Dunk Contest	All-Star Selection
Marlou Aquino & Noli Locsin – 1996; Tyrone Hopkins & Mike Orquillas – 1997; David Noel – 2009; KG Canaleta – 2012; Chris Ellis – 2013	Philip Cezar – 1989, 1990; Robert Jaworski – 1989–1992; Joey Loyzaga – 1989; Rey Cuenco – 1990; Dante Gonzalgo – 1990–1992; Chito Loyzaga – 1990–1993; Dondon Ampalayo – 1991–1992; Rudy Distrito – 1991; Pido Jarencio – 1992–1993; Manny Victorino – 1993; Sonny Cabatu – 1994; Jayvee Gayoso – 1994; Noli Locsin – 1994–1997, 1999; E.J. Feihl – 1995–1996; Marlou Aquino – 1996–1997, 1999; Bal David – 1996–1999; Vince Hizon – 1996–1997; Wilmer Ong – 1996; Vergel Meneses – 2000; Mark Caguioa – 2001, 2004–2008, 2011–2013, 2015–2017, 2019; Jayjay Helterbrand – 2001, 2004–2008, 2010; Jun Limpot – 2001; Ronald Magtulis – 2001; Eric Menk – 2003–2006, 2009, 2010; Rommel Adducul – 2004–2006; Paul Artadi – 2004, 2009–2010; Junthy Valenzuela – 2004, 2008; Sunday Salvacion – 2007; Ronald Tubid – 2007, 2009–2010; David Noel (import) – 2009; JC Intal – 2010–2011; Willie Miller – 2010–2011; Dylan Ababou – 2012; Rico Maierhofer – 2012; Japeth Aguilar – 2013–2019, 2023–2024, 2026; Chris Ellis – 2013–2014, 2017; LA Tenorio – 2013–2015, 2017–2019, 2023; Mac Baracael – 2014; Greg Slaughter – 2014–2016, 2019; Joe Devance – 2016–2018; Scottie Thompson – 2016–2019, 2023–2024, 2026; Kevin Ferrer – 2017; Jeremiah Gray – 2023; Jamie Malonzo – 2023–2024; John Pinto – 2023–2024; Stanley Pringle – 2023–2024; Christian Standhardinger – 2023–2024; Maverick Ahanmisi – 2024; RJ Abarrientos – 2026; Stephen Holt – 2026

== Notable players ==
=== Members of the 50 Greatest Players in PBA History ===
- Johnny Abarrientos – 2006–2010
- Francis Arnaiz – 1984–1986
- Marlou Aquino – 1996–2000
- Mark Caguioa – 2001–2020
- Allan Caidic – 1999
- Philip Cezar – 1990–1991
- Jayjay Helterbrand – 2000–2017
- Freddie Hubalde – 1990
- Robert Jaworski – 1984–1997
- Chito Loyzaga – 1986–1993
- Vergel Meneses – 1999–2002
- Eric Menk – 2001–2013
- Willie Miller – 2010–2011
- Kerby Raymundo – 2012–2013
- Scottie Thompson – 2015–present
- Arnie Tuadles – 1985
- Manny Victorino – 1993

=== Imports ===
1979:

- Larry McNeill
- Dean Tolson

1980:

- Jim Bradley
- Larry McNeill

1981:

- Larry McNeill
- Dean Tolson

1982:

- Lew Massey
- Rickey Brown
- Larry McNeill

1983:

- Lew Massey
- Anthony Roberts
- Jacky Dorsey

1984:

- Tony Washam

1985:

- Harold Driver
- John Campbell
- Michael Hackett

1986:

- Terry Duerod
- Anthony Hunter
- Clinton Wheeler
- Keith Gray
- Michael Hackett
- Billy Ray Bates

1987:

- Michael Hackett
- Billy Ray Bates

1988:

- Jamie Waller
- Billy Ray Bates
- Kevin Gamble
- Tommy Davis
- Joe Ward

1989:

- Carlton McKinney
- Daren Queenan
- Carlos Briggs

1990:

- Glenn Dedmon
- Sylvester Gray
- Carlos Briggs
- Toney Mack
- Darryl Joe

1991:

- Ronald Davis
- William Alexander
- Jervis Cole
- Wes Matthews

1992:

- Jervis Cole
- Jamie Waller
- Danny Jones

1993:

- Tony Massop
- Brian Shorter
- Benjamin Mohammad
- Terry Thames

1994:

- Darrin Mayo
- Mitchell Wiggins
- Marlin Kimbrew
- Steve Hood

1995:

- Isaiah Morris
- Darryl Prue
- Alexander Coles
- Andre Hardy
- Antonio Madison

1996:

- Fred Cofield
- Reggie Fox
- Henry James
- Derek Rucker

1997:

- Andy Bostick
- Dennis Edwards
- Tyrone Hopkins
- Chris King
- Purnell Perry
- Leon Trimmingham

1998:

- Chris King
- Mike Cumberland
- Dennis Edwards
- John Strickland
- Frank Western
- DeWayne Wesley
- Wayman Strickland
- Joe Wylie
- Kenny Payne
- Rick Brunson

1999:

- Mario Donaldson

2000:

- Ryan Fletcher

2001:

- Jarrod Gee
- Brian Green
- Roy Hammonds
- Mark Jones

2002:

- Ben Davis
- Ricky Price

2003:

- Rossel Ellis
- George Reese

2004:

- Torraye Braggs

2005–06:

- Eddie Elisma
- Sean Lampley
- Chris Porter

2006–07:

- Rod Nealy

2007–08:

- Rahshon Turner
- Ernest Brown
- Chris Alexander

2008–09:

- David Noel

2009–12:

- Awvee Storey
- Mildon Ambres
- Denham Brown
- Chris Daniels
- Nate Brumfield
- Curtis Stinson
- Donald Sloan
- Jackson Vroman
- Cedric Bozeman

2012–13:

- Herbert Hill
- Vernon Macklin
- Dior Lowhorn

2013–14

- Leon Rodgers
- Josh Powell
- Gabriel Freeman
- Zaccheus Mason

2014–15

- Michael Dunigan
- Orlando Johnson
- Sanchir Tungalag
- Kim Jiwan

2016

- Othyus Jeffers
- Paul Harris
- Justin Brownlee

2017

- Justin Brownlee

2018

- Charles García
- Justin Brownlee

2019

- Justin Brownlee

2021–22

- Justin Brownlee

2022–23

- Justin Brownlee

2023–24

- Tony Bishop

2024–25

- Justin Brownlee

2025–26

- Justin Brownlee
- Riley Grigsby

=== Retired numbers ===
Barangay Ginebra San Miguel retired numbers
N°	Player	Position	Tenure
7	Robert Jaworski	G	1984–1998^{[a]}
8	Allan Caidic	G	1998–1999^{[b]}

- ^{a} – retired on July 8, 2012 during the semifinal round of the 2012 PBA Governors Cup
- ^{b} – retired during the 2000 PBA season after announcing Caidic's retirement. Jersey number retired together with the San Miguel Beermen

== Coaches ==
- Pilo Pumaren (1979–1980)
- Nemie Villegas (1980–1981)
- Turo Valenzona (1981–1984)
- Robert Jaworski (1984–1998)
- Rino Salazar (interim, 1998–2000)
- Allan Caidic (2000–2004)
- Siot Tanquingcen (2004–2006; 2011–2012)
- Jong Uichico (2006–2012)
- Alfrancis Chua (2013)
- Ato Agustin (2013–2014; 2015)
- Jeffrey Cariaso (2014–2015)
- Frankie Lim (2015)
- Tim Cone (2015–present)

== Team managers ==
- Adolf Ferrer
- Art Trinidad
- Bernabe Navarro (1980s until 1998)
- Casiano "Jun" Cabalan (1999–2000)
- Allan Caidic (2004–2006)
- Eric Altamirano (2004 Fiesta Conference)
- Ira Maniquis (2000–2004)
- Samboy Lim (2006–2013)
- Alfrancis Chua (2013–present)

== See also ==
- Barangay Ginebra San Miguel draft history
