= Jimbo Aquino =

Filipino basketball player (born 1985)

Personal information
- Born: October 13, 1985 (age 41) Bamban, Tarlac, Philippines
- Listed height: 6 ft 3 in (1.91 m)
- Listed weight: 180 lb (82 kg)

Career information
- High school: CCP (Quezon City)
- College: San Sebastian
- PBA draft: 2010: 1st round, 8th overall pick
- Drafted by: Barangay Ginebra Kings
- Playing career: 2010–2020
- Position: Shooting guard / small forward

Career history
- 2010–2011: Barangay Ginebra Kings
- 2013–2014: Talk 'N Text Tropang Texters
- 2018–2019: Pampanga Lanterns
- 2019–2020: Nueva Ecija MiGuard

Career highlights
- NCAA Philippines champion (2009); NCAA Philippines Finals MVP (2009); UAAP NCAA All-Star Game MVP (2009)

Jimbo Reyes Aquino (born October 13, 1985) is a Filipino former professional basketball player. After winning Finals MVP for the San Sebastian Stags in 2009, he played limited minutes in the PBA and also had stints in the MPBL.

== College career ==
Aquino's best college season came in Season 85. He scored a season-high 26 points for the Stags in a win against the San Beda Red Lions. For that performance, he was selected as the NCAA's first-ever Player of the Week. He followed that up with 17 points in a win over the CSB Blazers as he teamed up with San Sebastian rookie Calvin Abueva to get the Stags the solo lead of the standings. He scored 23 points as the Stags became the last unbeaten team in the NCAA. This got him his second NCAA POW. The Stags finished the first round of eliminations with no losses and eight straight wins. He then scored 22 points with eight rebounds in a 46-point win over EAC, their 12th straight win. He hit the 30-point mark against the Mapúa Cardinals as the Stags won their 13th straight. In a win against San Beda, he had 25 points, nine rebounds, three assists, and a steal. The Stags finally broke the NCAA record with their 15th straight win, this time against Arellano. The streak ended at the hands of the Letran Knights. They were able to bounce back with a win over the JRU Heavy Bombers, in which he had 20 points and 11 rebounds in 35 minutes as they gained a twice-to-beat advantage. However, they weren't able to secure first seed as they lost to San Beda and he had a season-low nine points and a costly turnover down the stretch. He was also suspended for a game after that loss for punching San Beda's Jake Pascual. In his first game back, he scored 14 points to help the Stags get past JRU and into the Finals. In Game 1 of the Finals against San Beda, he scored 24 points in the win. In Game 2, he scored 10 of his 16 points in the fourth quarter, before being helped to the bench with a sprained ankle with over three minutes left to play. The Stags held on to win their 12th overall championship and he was awarded Finals MVP.

== Professional career ==
=== PBA career ===
After his college career ended, Aquino applied for the 2010 PBA Draft. He was selected with the eighth pick by the Barangay Ginebra Kings. Ginebra had to drop Sunday Salvacion to bring him into the team. However, he was constantly on Ginebra's bench and was traded a year later in a three-team trade to the Barako Bull Energy Cola. However, he never got a chance to play for Barako Bull. He received a second chance with the Talk 'N Text Tropang Texters in 2013. Less than a year later, Talk 'N Text made him available for the 2014 Expansion Draft. He was not selected in that draft.

=== MPBL career ===
In 2018, Aquino joined the Maharlika Pilipinas Basketball League (MPBL) team the Pampanga Lanterns. He then played for the Nueva Ecija MiGuard until the 2019–20 season was postponed due to the COVID-19 pandemic.

== PBA career statistics ==
Legend
GP	Games played	MPG	Minutes per game
FG%	Field-goal percentage	3P%	3-point field-goal percentage	FT%	Free-throw percentage
RPG	Rebounds per game	APG	Assists per game	SPG	Steals per game
BPG	Blocks per game	PPG	Points per game	**Bold**	Career high

=== Season-by-season averages ===
Year	Team	GP	MPG	FG%	3P%	FT%	RPG	APG	SPG	BPG	PPG
2010–11	Barangay Ginebra	**28**	**9.4**	.348	**.357**	**.800**	1.0	.2	.2	.1	**3.0**
2011–12	Barangay Ginebra	16	8.4	**.462**	.143	.600	.8	**.4**	.1	.1	2.5
2012–13	Talk 'N Text	5	7.6	.300	.000	.600	**1.4**	.2	.0	**.2**	1.8
Career		49	8.9	.377	.297	.720	.9	.3	.2	.1	2.7
