= Tungalagiin Sanchir =

Mongolian basketball player (born 1989)

No. 14 – Nalaikh Bison
- Position: Shooting guard / small forward

Personal information
- Born: April 8, 1989 (age 37) Ulaanbaatar, Mongolia
- Listed height: 6 ft 4 in (1.93 m)
- Listed weight: 200 lb (91 kg)

Career information
- High school: High School #40 of Bayangol District, Ulaanbaatar
- College: Otgontenger University and Institute of Trade Industry
- Playing career: 2007–present

Career history
- 2007–2010: Tavan Tolgoi Trans Geiers (Mongolia)
- 2011–2014: Bayanzurkh Bulls (Mongolia)
- 2013–2014: SBL Khasiin Khuleguud (Mongolia)
- 2014–2015: Mon-Altius Madimos Falcons (Mongolia)
- 2015: Barangay Ginebra San Miguel (Philippines)
- 2015–2016: Sentosa Leopards (Mongolia)
- 2016–2021: SBL Khasiin Khuleguud (Mongolia)
- 2021–2023: Erdenetiin Uurkhaichid (Mongolia)
- 2023–: Nalaikh Bison (Mongolia)

Career highlights
- MNBA champion (2014,2023); MNBA Finals MVP (2014); MNBA Season MVP (2016,2023)

Tungalagiin Sanchir (Mongolian: Тунгалагийн Санчир, born April 8, 1989) is a Mongolian professional basketball player. He has played for the Barangay Ginebra San Miguel of the Philippine Basketball Association (PBA). He is considered to be one of the best Mongolian basketball players of today. Before his stint with Ginebra, Sanchir played for Mon-Altius Madimos Falcons of the Mongolian National Basketball Association, the top basketball league in Mongolia.

Sanchir has also represented the Mongolian national team in various international basketball competitions since 2009. The most recent in the 2014 Asian Games where he averaged 16.6 points and 5.6 rebounds per game to lead the Mongolians to an 8th-place finish, its best finish ever in the tournament.

On April 1, 2015, it was announced that Sanchir will be Barangay Ginebra's Asian reinforcement for the 2015 Governors' Cup. In late May 2015, Barangay Ginebra announced that they will replace Sanchir with Korean guard Jiwan Kim as their Asian import.

== Amateur career ==
=== High school career ===
Sanchir began playing basketball at a very young age and attended Bayangol District's High School #40. His very first basketball coach was the school's physical education teacher Mendsaikhan. Sanchir began going to coach Mendsaikhan's basketball training courses and fell in love with the sport. In his 8th grade, he was accepted into the school's basketball team and won many local and national tournaments.

=== College career ===
In 2007, Sanchir received invitation to play for Otgontenger University, which had a strong basketball team. Sanchir accepted the offer and started playing for Otgontenger. Also at the same time, he began his semi-pro career with MBA's Tavan Tolgoi Trans Geiers under the leadership of Mongolian basketball coach Ts. Tseverbal. Tseverbal noticed Sanchir's potential when he played against his university team in the national championship. Before Sanchir's sophomore year started, coach Tseverbal invited him to play for his team, Institute of Trade Industry Geiers and the young man accepted. In his first year with the Geiers, they won the national college league title in 2008 and he was named the MVP. Sanchir also led various college tournaments in scoring and the Geiers were unstoppable force in college basketball.

== Professional career ==
In his rookie season with the Tavan Tolgoi Trans Geiers, Sanchir, who was 18 years old then, barely saw an action and didn't contribute much to the team's success. Geiers were also making its league debut and advanced all the way to the Finals but lost to the eventual champion Kharaagiin Khartsaguud. Although was disappointed in his playing time, Sanchir began practicing harder than everyone during that summer and erased his own doubt in himself. His effort paid off as coach Tseverbal made Sanchir a starter for the Geiers in 2008–09 season. It was a break-out year for Sanchir as he led the league in scoring and rebounding. Although his team didn't win a championship, Sanchir was named the Most Improved Player of the season.

In 2010, Sanchir accepted the offer to play for the Bayanzurkh Bulls, a newly established team of the MNBA. In the 2011 MBA All-Star Game, Sanchir led all in scoring and his team to a win, and was named the game's MVP. His popularity was growing fast. In 2011–2012 season, Sanchir began playing for the fan-favorite SBL Khasiin Khuleguud, which won the National Title three times before. Khuleguud advanced all the way to the Finals with Sanchir's scoring dominance and faced the Bulls, Sanchir's former team in the Finals. They lost to the Bulls 4–2.

In 2013–14 season, SBL Khasiin Khuleguud again advanced to the Finals against Alliance Tech Hawks. But this time, Sanchir wasn't going to accept the second place. Khuleguud swept the Hawks in four games and Sanchir won his first championship in the top league. Not surprisingly, Sanchir led everyone in scoring and was named the Finals Most Valuable Player.

In 2014–15 season, Sanchir signed a two-year deal to play for the Mon-Altius Madimos Falcons and alongside American import Smush Parker, former Lakers point guard. The duo played well together, but struggled due to poor coaching and management. The Falcons finished the season in 4th place and advanced to the playoffs. But in the first round, they lost to the #5 seed Tanan Garid. Sanchir averaged 30.1 points, 8.3 rebounds, 3.9 assists during the season but shot only 39.7% from the field.

On April 1, 2015, it was announced that Sanchir will be Barangay Ginebra's Asian reinforcement for the 2015 Governors' Cup. In Barangay Ginebra's game against Talk 'N Text Tropang Texters, Sanchir was controversially benched and did not play throughout the game, but earned sympathy and respect from fans.

At the end of May, it was announced that Sanchir will be part ways with Barangay Ginebra and will be replaced by South Korean Jiwan Kim. Sanchir averaged 4.5 points, 1 rebound, and 1.8 turnovers in just 4 games wearing the Ginebra uniform.

== PBA career statistics ==
Legend
GP	Games played	MPG	Minutes per game
FG%	Field-goal percentage	3P%	3-point field-goal percentage	FT%	Free-throw percentage
RPG	Rebounds per game	APG	Assists per game	SPG	Steals per game
BPG	Blocks per game	PPG	Points per game	**Bold**	Career high

Correct as of May 31, 2015

=== Season-by-season averages ===
Year	Team	GP	MPG	FG%	3P%	FT%	RPG	APG	SPG	BPG	PPG
2015	Ginebra	**4**	**10.5**	**.312**	**.200**	**.778**	**2.0**	.0	.0	**0.3**	**4.5**
Career		4	10.5	.312	.200	.778	2.0	.0	.0	0.3	4.5

== International career ==
After winning the Most Improved Player Award in 2009, Sanchir's success was noticed by a South Korean coach Park Sun Ghen, who was in charge of the Mongolian national team at the time and invited him to try out for the national team. Eventually he made the team and began his international career by playing in the 2009 East Asian Championship Hong Kong representing Mongolia. Since then, he has represented Mongolia in many international tournaments such as East Asian and Asian Games, Asian Beach Games, Universiade and other competitions.

Sanchir represented Mongolia in 2013 World Universiade, in which he averaged 20.8 points and 5.6 rebounds under 28 minute playing time. But he still led the tournament in scoring. He also made the winning 3-pointer against Japan. The victory helped Mongolia to finish in 16th place.

=== 2014 Asian Games ===
At the 2014 Asian Games, Sanchir again led the Mongolian team in scoring. But this time, history was made. The Blue Wolves began the competition from the bottom stage - qualifying round. They were with Hong Kong, Maldives and Kuwait in Group A. In the first game against Hong Kong, Sanchir scored 31 points and grabbed 13 rebounds and Mongolia beat Hong Kong 86–77. Then Mongolia had an easy win over Maldives 112–54, in which Sanchir played only 11 minutes and still finished with 10 points. Its final and most crucial game against Kuwait was important. Down by 1, Sanchir drove against Kuwait defenders and drew a foul. He made both shots and Mongolia was up by 1 with a few seconds remaining. On the last play of the game, Kuwait player shot the ball as time expired. The ball didn't go in, but a foul was called. Unfortunately, after a review, it was determined that there was no foul. Mongolia would lose a heart-breaking defeat but Sanchir led again with 23 points and 9 rebounds.

In the preliminary round, Mongolia first played against Jordan. No one thought Mongolia would even give a fight. But after trailing the first quarter 18–14, Mongolia outscored their opponent 69–53 in the last three quarters and had a historic win. It guaranteed Mongolia to advance to the quarter-finals for the first time ever. Sanchir had 19 points, 7 rebounds and teammate Bilguun Battuvshin led the team with 26 points and 10 rebounds. Against host country South Korea, Mongolia gave a good fight in the first half, trailing by only a point. But the big opponents were too strong at the end, Mongolia lost 90–67. Sanchir led all players with 24 points. After the game, South Korea's coach gave a lot of credit to Mongolia, especially to Sanchir and respect was earned.

In the quarter-final, Mongolia was pitted with China, Iran and Japan. Playing their 6th game in 5 days, the tired and under-manned Blue Wolves had no chance against China, losing by 41 points. Sanchir did his best with 15 points and 4 rebounds. Against Iran, coach Bayartsogt Odonbaatar rested Sanchir and Bilguun. Against Japan, Mongolia again lacked energy and lost by 26 points. Sanchir had 26 of the team's 70 points and grabbed 6 rebounds. In the Classification round, Mongolia first faced against Qatar and lost by only 9 points. Unfortunately, exhausted Sanchir had his worst game of the tournament, finishing with just 3 points. For the 7th place and final game of the tournament, Mongolia played against World Cup quality opponent Philippines. Besides leading the first quarter 21–18, Mongolia again couldn't close out the game and lost. Sanchir had 15 points and Bilguun led the team with 18 points.

Although Mongolia didn't win a medal, it was a historic run for the underdog nation. Mongolia was the 8th best team in Asia, finishing on top of Chinese Taipei, Kuwait, Jordan, and India.
