= 1979 PBA All-Filipino Conference finals =

Basketball cup finals

Team	Coach	Wins
Crispa Redmanizers	Baby Dalupan	3
Toyota Tamaraws	Dante Silverio	2
- Dates: June 26 – July 7, 1979
- Television: MBS
- Radio network: DWXL

PBA All-Filipino Conference finals chronology
- < 1978 1980 >

The 1979 PBA All-Filipino Conference finals is the best-of-5 basketball championship series of the 1979 PBA All-Filipino Conference. The Crispa Redmanizers and Toyota Tamaraws battled once again in the finals, this time for the All-Filipino supremacy.

The Crispa Redmanizers won their finals series against the defending champion Toyota Tamaraws, three games to two, to regain the All-Filipino crown.

== Qualification ==
Crispa Redmanizers		Toyota Tamaraws
Finished 14–2 (.875)	Eliminations	Finished 14–2 (.875)
Finished 5–1 (.833), 1st	Semifinals	Finished 4–2 (.667), 2nd

== Games summary ==
MBS

June 26

Crispa Redmanizers 122, Toyota Tamaraws 107
Scoring by quarter: 40–27, 21–28, 28–26, 33–26
Pts: Co 35 Cezar 30	Pts: Tuadles 24

Araneta Coliseum, Quezon City

The Tamaraws once enjoyed a six-point lead in the third quarter, 75–69, after overhauling a 59–67 deficit.

MBS

June 28

Crispa Redmanizers 114, Toyota Tamaraws 121
Scoring by quarter: 28–28, 28–30, 27–30, 31–33
Pts: Fabiosa 24	Pts: Jaworski 25

Araneta Coliseum, Quezon City

The Redmanizers lost a 79–72 lead in the third quarter and fell behind by eight points early in the fourth frame, 83–91.

MBS

July 3

Crispa Redmanizers 112, Toyota Tamaraws 109
Scoring by quarter: 24–23, 29–29, 37–28, 22–29
Pts: Co 33	Pts: Arnaiz 26

Araneta Coliseum, Quezon City

The Redmanizers appeared headed for an easy win when they led, 98–89, early in the final period. But Toyota's sensational rookie Arnie Tuadles ignited a searing 18–6 Tamaraw run that wiped out Crispa's lead and put Toyota on top, 107–104, with 2:37 remaining.

Tuadles tied the game at 109-all before Joy Dionisio scored on a long 25-foot shot that proved to be the winning shot for Crispa, 111–109.

MBS

July 5

Crispa Redmanizers 110, Toyota Tamaraws 113
Scoring by quarter: 22–27, 35–34, 28–30, 25–22
Pts: Co 31 Hubalde 30	Pts: Fernandez 27

Araneta Coliseum, Quezon City

Robert Jaworski delivered the tie-breaking basket on his own interception while Abe King and Francis Arnaiz combined for three points each in a 7–0 blast in the last two minutes for a winning 113–108 Tamaraw lead.

MBS

July 7

Crispa Redmanizers 118, Toyota Tamaraws 111
Scoring by quarter: 32–35, 31–23, 26–28, 29–25
Pts: Co 24	Pts: Fernandez 36 Tuadles 29
Crispa wins series, 3–2

Araneta Coliseum, Quezon City

The Tamaraws last tasted the lead at 107–106 with 3:11 left, but then Freddie Hubalde ignited the breakaway that turned the tide of the game. Atoy Co scored on a three-point play after a miss by Ramon Fernandez to make it 111–107 and after a Toyota timeout, Philip Cezar completed another three-point play on an assist by Gregorio Dionisio for a 114–107 lead with 1:30 to go.

1979 PBA All-Filipino Conference Champions

Crispa Redmanizers
Seventh title

== Rosters ==
Crispa Redmanizers roster
Players

Pos.	#	POB	Name	Height	Weight	DOB (YYYY–MM–DD)	From
C	5	(Philippines)	Abet Guidaben	6 ft 5 in (1.96 m)			USJ–R
G	6	(Philippines)	Fortunato Co, Jr	6 ft 1 in (1.85 m)			Mapúa
F	7	(Philippines)	Rodolfo Soriano	6 ft 2 in (1.88 m)			UE
C	8	(Philippines)	Jaime Javier	6 ft 5 in (1.96 m)			José Rizal
G	9	(Philippines)	Gregorio Dionisio	5 ft 9 in (1.75 m)			Adamson
G/F	10	(Philippines)	Freddie Hubalde	6 ft 1 in (1.85 m)			Mapúa
G/F	11	(Philippines)	Bogs Adornado	6 ft 1 in (1.85 m)			UST
G/F	12	(Philippines)	Virgilio Dela Cruz	6 ft 3 in (1.91 m)			Mapúa
G	14	(Philippines)	Luis Varela	6 ft 1 in (1.85 m)			UE
G	15	(Philippines)	Bernie Fabiosa	5 ft 9 in (1.75 m)			UE
F	18	(Philippines)	Philip Cezar	6 ft 3 in (1.91 m)			José Rizal
F	24	(Philippines)	Filomeno Gulfin	6 ft 2 in (1.88 m)			Southwestern-U
G	34	(Philippines)	Edmundo Espinosa	5 ft 9 in (1.75 m)			Southwestern-U

Coaches

Head coach

- (Philippines) Baby Dalupan

Assistant coach(es)

Legend

- (C) Team captain
- Injured

Toyota Tamaraws roster
Players

Pos.	#	POB	Name	Height	Weight	DOB (YYYY–MM–DD)	From
F	5	(Philippines)	Ernesto Estrada	5 ft 11 in (1.80 m)			Visayas
F/C	6	(Philippines)	Abe King	6 ft 3 in (1.91 m)			San Beda
G	7	(Philippines)	Robert Jaworski	6 ft 0 in (1.83 m)			UE
G	8	(Philippines)	Francis Arnaiz	5 ft 10 in (1.78 m)			Ateneo
F/C	10	(Philippines)	Ramon Fernandez	6 ft 4 in (1.93 m)			San Carlos
G/F	11	(Philippines)	Arnie Tuadles	6 ft 2 in (1.88 m)			Visayas
G	12	(Philippines)	Pablo Javier	5 ft 11 in (1.80 m)			Far Eastern
G/F	13	(Philippines)	Jesus Sta.Maria	5 ft 11 in (1.80 m)			José Rizal
G	14	(Philippines)	Quirino Salazar	5 ft 9 in (1.75 m)			Letran
F	18	(Philippines)	Emerito Legaspi	5 ft 11 in (1.80 m)			UE
F	20	(Philippines)	Nicanor Bulaong	6 ft 3 in (1.91 m)			Far Eastern

Coaches

Head coach

- (Philippines) Dante Silverio

Assistant coach(es)

Legend

- (C) Team captain
- Injured

== Broadcast notes ==
Game	Play-by-play	Analyst
Game 1		
Game 2		
Game 3		
Game 4		
Game 5		
