= 1975 PBA Second Conference finals =

Team	Coach	Wins
Toyota Comets	Dante Silverio	2
Crispa Redmanizers	Baby Dalupan	1
- Dates: November 16–21, 1975
- Television: BBC
- Radio network: DWXL

The 1975 PBA Second Conference finals (officially named as the 1975 PBA Open Conference finals) was the best-of-5 basketball championship series of the 1975 PBA Second Conference, and the conclusion of the conference's playoffs. The Toyota Comets and the Crispa Redmanizers played for the second championship contested by the league.

The Toyota Comets won against the Crispa Redmanizers, 2–1.

== Qualification ==
Toyota Comets		Crispa Redmanizers
Finished 10–3 (.769), tied for 1st	Elims/ Round of six	Finished 10–3 (.769), tied for 1st
Finished 3–3 (.500), tied for 2nd, beats Noritake in a playoff	Semifinals	Finished 4–2 (.667), 1st

== Games summary ==
BBC

November 16

Toyota Comets 98, Crispa Redmanizers 96
Scoring by quarter: 24–27, 27–18, 24–23, 23–28
Pts: Ompong Segura 29	Pts: Atoy Co 26

Araneta Coliseum, Quezon City

BBC

November 18

Toyota Comets 91, Crispa Redmanizers 101
Scoring by quarter: 25–22, 24–24, 24–22, 18–33
Pts: Arnaiz 19 Jones 19	Pts: Adornado 22 Co 22

Araneta Coliseum, Quezon City

BBC

November 20

Toyota Comets 115, Crispa Redmanizers 102
Scoring by quarter: 34–21, 33–30, 32–39, 16–12
Pts: Francis Arnaiz 30	Pts: Atoy Co 23
Toyota wins series, 2–1

Araneta Coliseum, Quezon City

== Players' scoring averages ==
Toyota	Total points	Average	Crispa	Total points	Average
Francis Arnaiz	63	21	Fortunato Co, Jr	71	23.67
Byron Jones	61	20.3	Bogs Adornado	66	22
Rodolfo Segura	49	16.33	Philip Cezar	44	14.67
Robert Jaworski*	32	16	Johnny Burks	30	10
Ramon Fernandez*	22	11	Bernie Fabiosa	27	9
Oscar Rocha*	18	9	Pete Crotty	25	8.33
Stan Cherry	17	5.67	Rey Franco	18	6
Orly Bauzon	16	5.33	Rudy Soriano*	10	5

(*) Two games only, Fernandez did not see action in Game two because of a broken nose, Rocha was not fielded in Game one.

== Occurrences ==
Toyota's Robert Jaworski and Crispa's Rudy Soriano were suspended in Game two for deliberately punching fellow players in the previous game of the championship series. Soriano blooded Ramon Fernandez' nose in a rebound scramble while Jaworski retaliated for Fernandez by hitting Soriano. Both were also fined aside from the one-game suspension.

Crispa coach Baby Dalupan is fined P200 and suspended for one game after banging together the heads of referees Remigio Bartolome and Feliciano Santarina after the Redmanizers' Game 3 loss to Toyota.

On that same day on November 21, the PBA board rejects Crispa team manager Danny Floro's request for a change of referees. With Toyota leading the series, two games to one, following a 115–102 victory in Game three, the Redmanizers did not show up for Game four, therefore, the PBA forfeited the game and the championship series in favor of Toyota.

== Broadcast notes ==
Game	Play-by-play	Analyst
Game 1		
Game 2		
Game 3		
