= 1983 PBA All-Filipino Conference finals =

Basketball cup finals

Team	Coach	Wins
Crispa Redmanizers	Tommy Manotoc	3
Gilbey's Gin	Arturo Valenzona	0
- Dates: April 19–24, 1983
- Television: Vintage Sports (City2)
- Radio network: DZRP

PBA All-Filipino Conference finals chronology
- < 1980 1984 1st >

The 1983 PBA All-Filipino Conference finals was the best-of-5 basketball championship series of the 1983 PBA All-Filipino Conference, and the conclusion of the conference playoffs.

The Crispa Redmanizers scored a 3–0 sweep in their finals series against Gilbey's Gin to complete a 12-game winning streak and retains the All-Filipino crown.

== Qualification ==
Crispa Redmanizers		Gilbey's Gin
Finished 6–1 (.858), 1st	Eliminations	Finished 4–3 (.571), tied for 3rd
Finished 3–0 (1.000), 1st	Semifinals	Finished 2–1 (.667), 2nd

== Games summary ==
=== Game 1 ===
Vintage

April 19

Crispa Redmanizers 121, Gilbey's Gin 101
Scoring by quarter: 26–25, 26–17, 36–27, 33–32
Pts: Atoy Co 26	Pts: Gary Vargas 24

Araneta Coliseum, Quezon City

=== Game 2 ===
Vintage

April 21

Crispa Redmanizers 119, Gilbey's Gin 116
Scoring by quarter: 19–21, 41–31, 28–28, 31–36
Pts: Philip Cezar 26, Abet Guidaben 25	Pts: Willie Generalao 23

Araneta Coliseum, Quezon City

=== Game 3 ===
Vintage

April 24

Crispa Redmanizers 115, Gilbey's Gin 84
Scoring by quarter: 24–16, 26–24, 25–20, 40–24
Pts: Abet Guidaben 32, Atoy Co 29	Pts: Joseph Herrera 23
Crispa wins series, 3–0

Araneta Coliseum, Quezon City

1983 PBA All-Filipino Conference Champions

Crispa Redmanizers
10th title

== Rosters ==
Crispa Redmanizers roster
Players
Coaches

Pos.	#	POB	Name	Height	Weight	DOB (YYYY–MM–DD)	From
F/C	5	(Philippines)	Abet Guidaben	6 ft 5 in (1.96 m)	180 lb (82 kg)		USJ–R
G	6	(Philippines)	Fortunato Co, Jr	6 ft 1 in (1.85 m)	168 lb (76 kg)		Mapúa
G/F	7	(Philippines)	Arturo Cristobal	6 ft 1 in (1.85 m)	170 lb (77 kg)		Far Eastern
G/F	9	(Philippines)	Padim Israel	6 ft 3 in (1.91 m)	160 lb (73 kg)		Ateneo
F	10	(Philippines)	Freddie Hubalde	6 ft 1 in (1.85 m)	175 lb (79 kg)		Mapúa
F/C	13	(Philippines)	Elpidio Villamin	6 ft 2 in (1.88 m)	188 lb (85 kg)
G	14	(Philippines)	Tito Varela	6 ft 1 in (1.85 m)	165 lb (75 kg)		UE
G	15	(Philippines)	Bernie Fabiosa	5 ft 9 in (1.75 m)	160 lb (73 kg)		UE
F	16	(Philippines)	Angelito Esguerra	6 ft 3 in (1.91 m)	180 lb (82 kg)		Letran
C	17	(Philippines)	Romulo Mamaril	6 ft 6 in (1.98 m)	165 lb (75 kg)		Mapúa
F	18	(Philippines)	Philip Cezar	6 ft 3 in (1.91 m)	170 lb (77 kg)		José Rizal
G	24	(Philippines)	Ramon Cruz	5 ft 11 in (1.80 m)	155 lb (70 kg)		UE

Head coach

- (Philippines) Tommy Manotoc

Assistant coach(es)

- (Philippines) Narciso Bernardo

Legend

- (C) Team captain
- (CI) Commissioner's Cup Import
- (GI) Governors' Cup Import
- (EI) EASL Import
- (DP) Unsigned draft pick
- (FA) Free agent
- (IN) Inactive
- (S) Suspended
- (R) Rookie
- Injured

Gilbey's Gin roster
Players
Coaches

Pos.	#	POB	Name	Height	Weight	DOB (YYYY–MM–DD)	From
G/F	6	(Philippines)	Conrado Pasco	6 ft 2 in (1.88 m)	180 lb (82 kg)		Far Eastern
F	7	(Philippines)	Steve Watson	6 ft 2 in (1.88 m)	190 lb (86 kg)		Ateneo
F	8	(Philippines)	Marlowe Jacutin	6 ft 0 in (1.83 m)	160 lb (73 kg)		Visayas
F/C	10	(Philippines)	Eduardo Ducut	6 ft 5 in (1.96 m)	185 lb (84 kg)		Letran
F	11	(Philippines)	Gary Vargas	6 ft 2 in (1.88 m)	162 lb (73 kg)		PSBA
G	12	(Philippines)	Dennis Roldan	6 ft 0 in (1.83 m)	175 lb (79 kg)		TUA
F/C	13	(Philippines)	Antero Saldaña	6 ft 3 in (1.91 m)	185 lb (84 kg)		Letran
G/F	15	(Philippines)	Alex Clariño	6 ft 2 in (1.88 m)	190 lb (86 kg)		Lyceum
G	17	(Philippines)	Joseph Herrera	6 ft 0 in (1.83 m)	160 lb (73 kg)		Letran
F/C	18	(Philippines)	Eusebio Del Rosario	6 ft 2 in (1.88 m)	185 lb (84 kg)		UE
F	20	(Philippines)	Rolando Buhay	6 ft 3 in (1.91 m)	147 lb (67 kg)		NCBA
G	24	(Philippines)	Wilfredo Generalao	5 ft 8 in (1.73 m)	150 lb (68 kg)		Visayas

Head coach

- (Philippines) Arturo Valenzona

Assistant coach(es)

- (Philippines) Guillermo Afable

Legend

- (C) Team captain
- (CI) Commissioner's Cup Import
- (GI) Governors' Cup Import
- (EI) EASL Import
- (DP) Unsigned draft pick
- (FA) Free agent
- (IN) Inactive
- (S) Suspended
- (R) Rookie
- Injured

== Broadcast notes ==
Game	Play-by-play	Analyst
Game 1		
Game 2		
Game 3		
