= 1980 PBA All-Filipino Conference finals =

Basketball cup finals

Team	Coach	Wins
Crispa Redmanizers	Baby Dalupan	3
Toyota Tamaraws	Fort Acuña	1
- Dates: December 7–13, 1980
- Television: MBS
- Radio network: DWXL

PBA All-Filipino Conference finals chronology
- < 1979 1983 >

The 1980 PBA All-Filipino Conference finals was the best-of-5 basketball championship series of the 1980 PBA All-Filipino Conference, and the conclusion of the conference's playoffs.

The Crispa Redmanizers won their finals series against Toyota Tamaraws, three games to one, for an incredible 20–1 record and retains the All-Filipino crown.

== Qualification ==
Crispa Redmanizers		Toyota Tamaraws
Finished 9–0 (.1000)	Eliminations	Finished 7–2 (.778)
Finished 5–0 (.1000)	Quarterfinals	Finished 3–2 (.667)
Finished 3–0 (.1000), 1st	Semifinals	Finished 2–1 (.667), 2nd

== Games summary ==
=== Game 1 ===
MBS

December 7

Crispa Redmanizers 108, Toyota Tamaraws 101
Scoring by quarter: 25–22, 21–25, 31–31, 31–23
Pts: Atoy Co 27	Pts: Ramon Fernandez 48

Araneta Coliseum, Quezon City

Two completed fastbreaks by Atoy Co, the second from a steal by Bernie Fabiosa, were the key points of the exciting contest as the Redmanizers surge to a 103–96 lead with 1:40 left. Ramon Fernandez, who defied all his guard to unload 48 points, scored on a three-point shot, 99–103. Fabiosa came through with a pair of charities and Freddie Hubalde scored from under for a safe 107–101 lead with 23 ticks remaining.

=== Game 2 ===
MBS

December 9

Crispa Redmanizers 122, Toyota Tamaraws 102
Scoring by quarter: 26–25, 35–28, 30–26, 31–23
Pts: Philip Cezar 27	Pts: Arnie Tuadles 27

Araneta Coliseum, Quezon City

=== Game 3 ===
MBS

December 11

Crispa Redmanizers 94, Toyota Tamaraws 97
Scoring by quarter: 26–18, 22–21, 25–29, 21–29
Pts: Abet Guidaben 20	Pts: Ramon Fernandez 37

Araneta Coliseum, Quezon City

The Redmanizers were on their way to a 20-game sweep when they led by 13 points early in the third quarter. Sonny Jaworski, the focal point in the sideline incident between Don Pablo Carlos and coach Fort Acuña, was sent in the game by acting coach Carlos as the third quarter opened and the Big J welded the team together in its final thrust and with Ramon Fernandez and Arnie Tuadles pumping in the clutch hits, the Tamaraws finally got to turn the game around. Toyota was out front for the first time in the game, 75–73, in the first two minutes of the fourth quarter. After two ties and three lead changes, Crispa went up by five, 90–85. Ramon Fernandez and Abe King combined in a 10–0 run for a five-point Toyota margin, 95–90. Philip Cezar narrowed the gap but Fernandez again scored from the side for a 97–92 count. The last Crispa field goal was scored by Abet Guidaben, after which the Tamaraws ran the clock down. With 16 seconds left, the Redmanizers found itself with an opportunity to send the game into overtime, Philip Cezar committed a throw-in error and that turnover was what Toyota needed to put the game away as Crispa's winning streak was snapped.

=== Game 4 ===
MBS

December 13

Crispa Redmanizers 105, Toyota Tamaraws 91
Scoring by quarter: 31–22, 31–19, 17–33, 26–17
Pts: Philip Cezar 26	Pts: Arnie Tuadles 29
Crispa wins series, 3–1

Araneta Coliseum, Quezon City

Crispa Redmanizers led by as much as 24 points in the second quarter and weathered the last-ditch stand by Toyota in the fourth quarter to prevail before a huge crowd turnout of 25,000 at the Big Dome. The Tamaraws managed to close the gap to within four points, 77–81, as the game moved into the homestretch, a 9–2 run by the Redmanizers behind Atoy Co, Freddie Hubalde, Joy Dionisio and Philip Cezar put them in front by 11 points, 90–79. In the final wind-up, Delta Motors Executive Vice President Don Pablo Carlos, Jr, thrust in a role of acting Toyota coach, made his way to the Crispa bench and offered his hand in congratulations to Danny Floro.

1980 PBA All-Filipino Conference Champions

Crispa Redmanizers
Eight title

== Occurrences ==
During halftime of Game three of the finals, the Toyota Tamaraws lost their coach, Fort Acuña, who was fired by Delta Executive Vice-President and team manager Pablo Carlos, Jr. for insubordination and not considering the team's interest to give the paying public a good game. Delta Motors President Ricardo Silverio in a statement, supported the dismissal of coach Acuña.

== Rosters ==
Crispa Redmanizers roster
Players
Coaches

Pos.	No.	Nat.	Name	Ht.	Wt.
C	5	(Philippines)	Abet Guidaben	6 ft 5 in (1.96 m)		USJ–R
G	6	(Philippines)	Fortunato Co, Jr	6 ft 1 in (1.85 m)		Mapúa
C	8	(Philippines)	Jaime Javier	6 ft 5 in (1.96 m)		José Rizal
G	9	(Philippines)	Gregorio Dionisio	5 ft 9 in (1.75 m)		Adamson
G/F	10	(Philippines)	Freddie Hubalde	6 ft 1 in (1.85 m)		Mapúa
G/F	12	(Philippines)	Virgilio Dela Cruz	6 ft 3 in (1.91 m)		Mapúa
G	14	(Philippines)	Tito Varela	6 ft 1 in (1.85 m)		UE
G	15	(Philippines)	Bernie Fabiosa	5 ft 9 in (1.75 m)		UE
G	16	(Philippines)	Frank Natividad	6 ft 1 in (1.85 m)		UST
C	17	(Philippines)	Romulo Mamaril	6 ft 6 in (1.98 m)		Mapúa
F	18	(Philippines)	Philip Cezar	6 ft 3 in (1.91 m)		José Rizal
F	19	(Philippines)	Bernardo Carpio	6 ft 3 in (1.91 m)		Ateneo
G	34	(Philippines)	Edmundo Espinosa	5 ft 9 in (1.75 m)		Southwestern-U

Head coach

- (Philippines) Baby Dalupan

Assistant coach(es)

Legend

- (C) Team captain
- Injured

Toyota Tamaraws roster
Players
Coaches

Pos.	No.	Nat.	Name	Ht.	Wt.
F/C	6	(Philippines)	Abe King	6 ft 3 in (1.91 m)		San Beda
G	7	(Philippines)	Robert Jaworski	6 ft 0 in (1.83 m)		UE
G	8	(Philippines)	Francis Arnaiz	5 ft 10 in (1.78 m)		Ateneo
G	9	(Philippines)	Eduardo Merced	6 ft 0 in (1.83 m)		José Rizal
F/C	10	(Philippines)	Ramon Fernandez	6 ft 4 in (1.93 m)		San Carlos
G/F	11	(Philippines)	Arnie Tuadles	6 ft 2 in (1.88 m)		Visayas
G	12	(Philippines)	Pablo Javier	5 ft 11 in (1.80 m)		Far Eastern
G	14	(Philippines)	Quirino Salazar	5 ft 9 in (1.75 m)		Letran
F	18	(Philippines)	Emerito Legaspi	5 ft 11 in (1.80 m)		UE
F	20	(Philippines)	Nicanor Bulaong	6 ft 3 in (1.91 m)		Far Eastern
F	41	(Philippines)	Leopoldo Herrera	6 ft 3 in (1.91 m)		Wesleyan Philippines
G/F	44	(Philippines)	Danny Florencio	5 ft 10 in (1.78 m)		UST

Head coach

- (Philippines) Fort Acuña

Assistant coach(es)

Legend

- (C) Team captain
- Injured

== Broadcast notes ==
Game	Play-by-play	Analyst
Game 1		
Game 2		
Game 3		
Game 4		
