= 1984 PBA First All-Filipino Conference finals =

Basketball cup finals

Team	Coach	Wins
Crispa Redmanizers	Narciso Bernardo	4
Gilbey's Gin Tonics	Arturo Valenzona	1
- Dates: July 8–17, 1984
- Television: Vintage Sports (MBS)
- Radio network: DZRP

PBA First All-Filipino Conference finals chronology
- < 1983 1984 2nd >

The 1984 PBA First All-Filipino Conference finals was the best-of-7 basketball championship series of the 1984 PBA First All-Filipino Conference, and the conclusion of the conference playoffs. The Crispa Redmanizers and Gilbey's Gin Tonics played for the 27th championship contested by the league.

The Crispa Redmanizers won their 13th PBA title and retains the All-Filipino crown with a 4–1 series victory over Gilbey's Gin Tonics.

== Qualification ==
Crispa Redmanizers		Gilbey's Gin
Finished 10–4 (.714), tied for 2nd	Eliminations	Finished 8–6 (.571)
Beat Great Taste, 124–120, for outright semis	Quarterfinals	Finished 2–1 (.667)
Finished 4–2 (.667), 1st	Semifinals	Finished 3–3 (.500), tied for 2nd
Finished 4–2 (.667), 1st	Tiebreaker	Won against Beer Hausen, 115–109

== Games summary ==
=== Game 1 ===
Vintage

July 8

Crispa Redmanizers 127, Gilbey's Gin Tonics 118
Pts: Fortunato Co, Jr 35	Pts: Francis Arnaiz 24

Araneta Coliseum, Quezon City

The Redmanizers went on a rampage early in the third quarter with a runaway 22-point spread against the Gin Tonics, which played without Sonny Jaworski with a hamstring muscle injury and Romulo Mamaril with a left knee injury that came early in the semifinals.

=== Game 2 ===
Vintage

July 10

Crispa Redmanizers 144, Gilbey's Gin Tonics 120
Scoring by quarter: 25–37, 29–24, 43–24, 47–35

Araneta Coliseum, Quezon City

Gilbey's led by 14 points three times in the second quarter and were up 61–54 at halftime. The Redmanizers started the third period with a 9–0 run to take the upper hand, 63–61, after Joey Marquez tied the count, an 18–0 barrage by Crispa gave them an 81–63 lead. The overpowering 27–2 Crispa rampage which wiped out the Tonics' halftime edge took only five minutes and 20 seconds. The Redmanizers were up front by 12 points, 97–85, at the end of the third quarter. Crispa pulled away by as much as 26 points at 113–87 with time down to 7:32 in the final period.

=== Game 3 ===
Vintage

July 12

Crispa Redmanizers 105, Gilbey's Gin Tonics 118
Scoring by quarter: 16–26, 30–30, 34–20, 25–42
Pts: Fortunato Co, Jr 31	Pts: Steve Watson 25

Araneta Coliseum, Quezon City

Sonny Jaworski, who sat out in the first two games of the series as he was nursing with an injured hamstring, return in the third game and the Gin Tonics had their spirits uplifted with Big J's leadership. Gilbey's roared to an 18-point lead twice in the second quarter. In the third period, Jaworski's basket makes it 65–53 for Gilbeys, but he committed his fourth personal foul on a driving Atoy Co with 7:57 in the third, coach Arturo Valenzona sent Alex Clarino for the Big J. With Jaworski on the bench on account of four personal fouls, the Redmanizers made a comeback and they knotted the count at 72-all with time down to 1:57. The third quarter ended with Crispa on top, 80–76.

The fourth quarter resulted to eight deadlocks with the last at 98-all. With 1:53 left in the ballgame and Gilbey's up by a point, 102–101, a rare four-point play by Steve Watson enabled the Gin Tonics to break away, a lay-up by Willie Generalao on a fastbreak put Gilbey's lead to seven, 108–101, with 1:09 remaining.

=== Game 4 ===
Vintage

July 15

Crispa Redmanizers 115, Gilbey's Gin Tonics 109
Scoring by quarter: 30–20, 26–22, 24–37, 35–30
Pts: Abet Guidaben 37

Araneta Coliseum, Quezon City

From a 56–42 halftime lead by Crispa, the Gin Tonics made a torrid comeback behind Francis Arnaiz and Steve Watson. With barely three minutes gone in the third quarter, Sonny Jaworski takes a crack at his three-point shot and scores as Gilbey's finally cut down Crispa's lead to a single digit, 62–54. The Gin Tonics tied the count at 73-all with 2:54 left in the third period.

In the fourth quarter, Arnaiz throws an outlet pass to Joey Marquez to forge the last tie at 109-all. Abet Guidaben breaks the deadlock and give Crispa a two-point lead, 111–109, Gilbey's calls for a timeout with one minute left. The inbound play of Gilbey's was a little shaky as Arnaiz use up so much time as possible and snaps off a premature shot far out, it bounces off the rim and lands into the hands of a Crispa defender. Joey Marquez seals the fate of the Gin Tonics by committing a foul on Bernie Fabiosa, who sinks both free throws for a four-point spread with 34 seconds left in the ballgame.

=== Game 5 ===
Vintage

July 17

Crispa Redmanizers 134, Gilbey's Gin Tonics 118
Pts: Philip Cezar 31 Abet Guidaben 29	Pts: Gary Vargas 26
Crispa wins series, 4–1

Araneta Coliseum, Quezon City

Abet Guidaben and Atoy Co sparked Crispa's early breakaway in the first quarter, leading as much as 17 points, 34–17. The Gin Tonics rallied to within eight points twice in the third period, but from thereon, the Redmanizers were never seriously threatened for the rest of the game.

1984 PBA First All-Filipino Conference Champions

Crispa Redmanizers
13th title

== Rosters ==
Crispa Redmanizers roster
Players
Coaches

Pos.	#	POB	Name	Height	Weight	DOB (YYYY–MM–DD)	From
F/C	5	(Philippines)	Abet Guidaben	6 ft 5 in (1.96 m)			USJ–R
G	6	(Philippines)	Fortunato Co, Jr	6 ft 1 in (1.85 m)			Mapúa
G/F	7	(Philippines)	Arturo Cristobal	6 ft 1 in (1.85 m)			Far Eastern
G/F	9	(Philippines)	Padim Israel	6 ft 3 in (1.91 m)			Ateneo
F	10	(Philippines)	Freddie Hubalde	6 ft 1 in (1.85 m)			Mapúa
G	11	(United States)	William Pearson	6 ft 2 in (1.88 m)			Chaminade
F/C	12	(Philippines)	Elpidio Villamin	6 ft 2 in (1.88 m)
G	14	(Philippines)	Matthew Gaston	6 ft 1 in (1.85 m)			Ateneo
G	15	(Philippines)	Bernie Fabiosa	5 ft 9 in (1.75 m)			UE
G	17	(Philippines)	Lim Eng Beng	5 ft 11 in (1.80 m)			De La Salle
F/C	18	(Philippines)	Philip Cezar	6 ft 3 in (1.91 m)			José Rizal
C	25	(Philippines)	Jaime Javier	6 ft 5 in (1.96 m)			José Rizal

Head coach

- (Philippines) Narciso Bernardo

Assistant coach(es)

Legend

- (C) Team captain
- (CI) Commissioner's Cup Import
- (GI) Governors' Cup Import
- (EI) EASL Import
- (DP) Unsigned draft pick
- (FA) Free agent
- (IN) Inactive
- (S) Suspended
- (R) Rookie
- Injured

Gilbey's Gin Tonics roster
Players
Coaches

Pos.	#	POB	Name	Height	Weight	DOB (YYYY–MM–DD)	From
F	4	(Philippines)	Marlowe Jacutin	6 ft 0 in (1.83 m)			Visayas
F	5	(Philippines)	Steve Watson	6 ft 2 in (1.88 m)			Ateneo
G	6	(Philippines)	Conrado Pasco	6 ft 1 in (1.85 m)			Far Eastern
G	7	(Philippines)	Robert Jaworski	6 ft 1 in (1.85 m)			UE
G	8	(Philippines)	Francis Arnaiz	5 ft 11 in (1.80 m)			Ateneo
C	10	(Philippines)	Eduardo Ducut	6 ft 5 in (1.96 m)			Letran
G	11	(Philippines)	Gary Vargas	6 ft 1 in (1.85 m)			PSBA
F	13	(Philippines)	Antero Saldaña	6 ft 3 in (1.91 m)			Letran
C	14	(Philippines)	Romulo Mamaril	6 ft 6 in (1.98 m)			Mapúa
G	15	(Philippines)	Alex Clarino	6 ft 1 in (1.85 m)			Lyceum
F	17	(Philippines)	Joseph Herrera	6 ft 0 in (1.83 m)			Letran
F	20	(Philippines)	Rolando Buhay	6 ft 3 in (1.91 m)			NCBA
G	24	(Philippines)	Willie Generalao	5 ft 8 in (1.73 m)			Visayas
G/F	66	(Philippines)	Joey Marquez	6 ft 1 in (1.85 m)			Angeles

Head coach

- (Philippines) Arturo Valenzona

Assistant coach(es)

- (Philippines) Guillermo Afable

Legend

- (C) Team captain
- (CI) Commissioner's Cup Import
- (GI) Governors' Cup Import
- (EI) EASL Import
- (DP) Unsigned draft pick
- (FA) Free agent
- (IN) Inactive
- (S) Suspended
- (R) Rookie
- Injured

== Broadcast notes ==
Game	Play-by-play	Analyst
Game 1		
Game 2		
Game 3		
Game 4	Pinggoy Pecson	Freddie Webb
Game 5	Joe Cantada	Norman Black
