= 1975 Crispa Redmanizers season =

- Head coach: Baby Dalupan
- Owner(s): P. Floro and Sons, Inc.

First Conference results
- Record: 17–10 (63%)
- Place: 2nd
- Playoff finish: Finals

Second Conference results
- Record: 15–7 (68.2%)
- Place: 2nd
- Playoff finish: Finals

All-Philippine Championship results
- Record: 6–2 (75%)
- Place: 1st
- Playoff finish: Finals

Crispa Redmanizers seasons

The 1975 Crispa Redmanizers season was the 1st season of the franchise in the Philippine Basketball Association (PBA).

== Colors ==
Crispa-Floro Redmanizers
(dark)
(light)

== First Conference ==
The Crispa-Floro Redmanizers did not start out with a very strong lineup, the team was fielding in such names as Cesar Ijares, Eric Leano, Alex Azurin, Joel Gomez, Reynaldo Vallejo, Jesus Sta. Maria, Reynaldo Pages, Cristino Calilan and Rey Franco. The Redmanizers lost their very first game to Mariwasa-Noritake, 108-131 on April 13. That time, the big names were held in the amateurs as a concession to BAP president Lito Puyat, who said he was taking in the stars to the national team, but due to the inaction of Puyat, Crispa team manager Danny Floro took in his stars to the pro team and some were dropped from the roster.

After three straight defeats, the Crispa Redmanizers beat CFC Presto for their first victory with Atoy Co, Abet Guidaben, Philip Cezar, Bernie Fabiosa, Freddie Hubalde and Rudy Soriano joining the team. On April 27, William "Bogs" Adornado finally had his pro debut by scoring 32 points to lead Crispa past Tanduay, 122-100, at the Loyola Center.

On May 10, the first official Crispa vs Toyota game was played at the Rizal Memorial Coliseum. The Redmanizers won, 139-133.

== Championship & Rivalry with Toyota ==
Crispa advances to the best-of-five title series with Toyota by defeating U-Tex in the first-ever playoff for a finals berth, 121-113 on July 22. The Redmanizers won Game One of the finals series but lost to the Comets in four games.

The two teams met again in the second conference finals and with the Comets leading the series, 2-1, the Redmanizers did not show up for Game Four and forfeited the championship in favor of Toyota when the management's request for a change in choosing referees was denied by PBA Commissioner Leo Prieto.

In the third conference called All-Philippine Championship, the Redmanizers finally won over Toyota Comets in five games for their first-ever PBA crown. The Crispa Redmanizers got the nod of the year end "Seven-Up All-Filipino Sports Award" for the team of the year.

== Roster ==
Roster	#	Position	Height
Abet Guidaben	5	Center	6 ft 5 in (1.96 m)
Fortunato Co, Jr	6	Guard	6 ft 1.5 in (1.87 m)
Rodolfo Soriano	7	Center-Forward	6 ft 2 in (1.88 m)
Eric Leano ^{Played in 1st Conference}	8	Guard	5 ft 9 in (1.75 m)
Freddie Hubalde	10	Forward	6 ft 1 in (1.85 m)
William Adornado	11	Forward	6 ft 2 in (1.88 m)
Virgilio Dela Cruz	12	Guard	6 ft 3 in (1.91 m)
Bernie Fabiosa	15	Guard	5 ft 9 in (1.75 m)
Johnny Revilla ^{Played in 1st Conference}	16	Guard	6 ft 0 in (1.83 m)
Jesus Sta. Maria	17	Forward	5 ft 11 in (1.80 m)
Reynaldo Pages ^{Played in 2nd & 3rd Conference}	16 & 8	Forward	6 ft 1 in (1.85 m)
Philip Cezar	18	Forward-Center	6 ft 2.5 in (1.89 m)
Reynaldo Franco	19	Guard	5 ft 9 in (1.75 m)
Cristino Calilan	23	Guard	5 ft 8 in (1.73 m)
Johnny Burks ^{Import}	24	Center-Guard	6 ft 6 in (1.98 m)
Pete Crotty ^{Import}	25	Center	6 ft 9 in (2.06 m)
Alex Azurin ^{Released after 3 games}	14	Forward-Guard	5 ft 11.5 in (1.82 m)
Joel Gomez ^{Released after 4 games}	22	Guard	6 ft 0 in (1.83 m)
Cesar Ijares ^{Moved to Tanduay after 5 games}	9	Forward-Center	6 ft 3 in (1.91 m)
Reynaldo Vallejo ^{Moved to Tanduay after 3 games}	4	Guard	5 ft 9 in (1.75 m)
