= 1978 Crispa Redmanizers season =

- Head coach: Baby Dalupan

All-Filipino Conference results
- Record: 17–7 (70.8%)
- Place: 4th
- Playoff finish: Semifinals

Open Conference results
- Record: 14–9 (60.9%)
- Place: 2nd
- Playoff finish: Finals

Invitational Conference results
- Record: 4–3 (57.1%)
- Place: 3rd
- Playoff finish: N/A

Crispa Redmanizers seasons

The 1978 Crispa Redmanizers season was the 4th season of the franchise in the Philippine Basketball Association (PBA). Known as Crispa 400s starting the 2nd conference.

== Colors ==
Crispa Redmanizers (All-Filipino Conference)
(dark)
(light)
Crispa 400 (Open and Invitational Conferences)
(dark)
(light)

== Finals stint ==
Crispa stood firm to defend its last crown in the Open Conference with the All-Filipino unsuccessfully defended when they surprisingly faltered in the second round of the semifinals and were ousted by arch rival Toyota.

Coach Baby Dalupan personally choose 6-9 Ansley Truitt and 6-8 Paul Mills for their two imports. U-Tex and Crispa advanced to the semifinals without much difficulty and placed first and second after the semifinal round to enter into the championship. Unlike their last year's confrontation, the 400s were underdog for the first time in the title series and matched against the Wranglers' triumvirate of Glenn McDonald, Byron "Snake" Jones and Lim Eng Beng. Crispa were swept in three games by U-Tex.

== Roster ==
Crispa Redmanizers roster
Players
Coaches

Pos.	No.	Nat.	Name	Ht.	Wt.
C	5	(Philippines)	Abet Guidaben	6 ft 5 in (1.96 m)		USJ–R
G	6	(Philippines)	Fortunato Co, Jr	6 ft 1 in (1.85 m)		Mapúa
F	7	(Philippines)	Rodolfo Soriano	6 ft 2 in (1.88 m)		UE
F	8	(Philippines)	Rey Pages	6 ft 1 in (1.85 m)		De La Salle
G	9	(Philippines)	Gregorio Dionisio	5 ft 9 in (1.75 m)		Adamson
G/F	10	(Philippines)	Freddie Hubalde	6 ft 1 in (1.85 m)		Mapúa
G/F	11	(Philippines)	Bogs Adornado	6 ft 1 in (1.85 m)		UST
G/F	12	(Philippines)	Virgilio Dela Cruz	6 ft 3 in (1.91 m)		Mapúa
G	14	(Philippines)	Luis Varela	6 ft 1 in (1.85 m)		UE
G	15	(Philippines)	Bernie Fabiosa	5 ft 9 in (1.75 m)		UE
C	16	(Philippines)	Jaime Javier	6 ft 5 in (1.96 m)		José Rizal
G	17	(Philippines)	Armando Torres	6 ft 1 in (1.85 m)		FEATI
F	18	(Philippines)	Philip Cezar	6 ft 3 in (1.91 m)		José Rizal
G	19	(Philippines)	Rey Franco	5 ft 9 in (1.75 m)		UE
G	22	(Philippines)	Wilfredo Tanduyan	5 ft 10 in (1.78 m)		Southwestern-U
C	25	(United States)	Cyrus Mann (I)	6 ft 10 in (2.08 m)		Illinois State
F	32	(United States)	Paul Mills (I)	6 ft 8 in (2.03 m)
F/C	43	(United States)	Ansley Truitt (I)	6 ft 9 in (2.06 m)		California

Head coach

- (Philippines) Baby Dalupan

Assistant coach(es)

Legend

- (C) Team captain
- (I) Import
- Injured
