= 1975 PBA First Conference finals =

Basketball championship series

Team	Coach	Wins
Toyota Comets	Dante Silverio	3
Crispa Redmanizers	Baby Dalupan	1
- Dates: July 24–31, 1975
- Television: BBC
- Announcers: DWXL

PBA First Conference finals chronology
- 1976 >

The 1975 PBA First Conference finals was the best-of-5 basketball championship series of the 1975 PBA First Conference, and the conclusion of the conference's playoffs. The Toyota Comets and the Crispa Redmanizers played for the inaugural championship contested by the league. The tournament was officially named as an All-Filipino Conference, but it was reclassified in the 2010s as an import-laced tournament since the league gave teams the option to hire foreign players or "imports". This tournament was renamed as the "1975 PBA First Conference" since the 2001 edition of Hardcourt, the official PBA Annual.

The Toyota Comets became the league's first champion, winning their series in four games against the Crispa Redmanizers.

== Qualification ==
Toyota Comets		Crispa Redmanizers
Finished 13–3 (.812), 1st	Eliminations	Finished 12–4 (.750), 2nd
Finished 6–0 (1.000), 1st	Semifinals	Finished 3–3 (.500), tied for 2nd, beats U/tex in a playoff

== Games summary ==
BBC

July 24

Toyota Comets 103, Crispa Redmanizers 107
Scoring by quarter: 21–31, 33–30, 21–25, 28–21
Pts: Robert Jaworski 26	Pts: Bogs Adornado 29

Araneta Coliseum, Quezon City

BBC

July 28

Toyota Comets 88, Crispa Redmanizers 87
Scoring by quarter: 22–19, 30–26, 18–24, 18–18
Pts: Byron Jones 30	Pts: Atoy Co 24

Araneta Coliseum, Quezon City

BBC

July 29

Toyota Comets 109, Crispa Redmanizers 105
Scoring by quarter: 33–25, 27–28, 25–30, 24–22
Pts: Ompong Segura 23	Pts: Atoy Co 23

Araneta Coliseum, Quezon City

BBC

July 31

Toyota Comets 117, Crispa Redmanizers 96
Scoring by quarter: 25–25, 30–24, 35–24, 27–23
Pts: Ompong Segura 29	Pts: Atoy Co 22
Toyota wins series, 3–1

Araneta Coliseum, Quezon City

== Players' scoring averages ==
Toyota	Total points	Average	Crispa	Total points	Average
Rodolfo Segura	84	21	Fortunato Co, Jr	85	21.25
Byron Jones	77	19.25	Bogs Adornado	71	17.75
Robert Jaworski	74	18.5	Philip Cezar	59	14.75
Francis Arnaiz	65	16.25	Bernie Fabiosa	42	10.5
Cristino Reynoso	46	11.5	Freddie Hubalde	38	9.5
Ramon Fernandez	45	11.25	Abet Guidaben*	23	7.67
Joaquin Rojas	12	3.0	Rey Franco	30	7.5
Orly Bauzon	7	1.75	Rudy Soriano	29	7.25
Aurelio Clariño	4	1.0	Virgilio dela Cruz	8	2.0

(*) Three games only, did not see action in Game four

== Broadcast notes ==
Game	Play-by-play	Analyst
Game 1		
Game 2		
Game 3		
Game 4		
