= PBA Mythical Team =

Sports award

The Philippine Basketball Association (PBA) Mythical Team is an honor given annually to the best players in each of the five basketball positions: point guard, shooting guard, small forward, power forward and center. A Second Mythical Team was institutionalized in 1984. This honor is given during the PBA's Leo Awards.

Starting from the 2020 PBA season, each Mythical Team consists of two backcourt (guards) and three frontcourt (forwards or centers or both) players. Previously, each Mythical Team would have two guards, two forwards, and a center.

== Selections ==
^	Denotes players who are still active in the PBA
*	Elected to the PBA Hall of Fame
Player (X)	Denotes the number of times the player has been selected
**Player** **(in bold text)**	Indicates the player who won the PBA Most Valuable Player in the same season

Season	Position	Mythical First Team		Mythical Second Team		Ref.
Season	Position	Players	Teams	Players	Teams	Ref.
1975	Guard	Francis Arnaiz*	Toyota Comets	The Mythical Second Team was first awarded in 1984.		
1975	Guard	Atoy Co*	Crispa Redmanizers	The Mythical Second Team was first awarded in 1984.		
1975	Center	Manny Paner*	Royal Tru-Orangemen	The Mythical Second Team was first awarded in 1984.		
1975	Forward	Ernesto Estrada	Royal Tru-Orangemen	The Mythical Second Team was first awarded in 1984.		
1975	Forward	**Bogs Adornado***	Crispa Redmanizers	The Mythical Second Team was first awarded in 1984.		
1976	Guard	Francis Arnaiz* (2)	Toyota Tamaraws	The Mythical Second Team was first awarded in 1984.		
1976	Guard	Atoy Co (2)*	Crispa Denims	The Mythical Second Team was first awarded in 1984.		
1976	Center	Ramon Fernandez*	Toyota Tamaraws	The Mythical Second Team was first awarded in 1984.		
1976	Forward	**Bogs Adornado*** (2)	Crispa Denims	The Mythical Second Team was first awarded in 1984.		
1976	Forward	Philip Cezar*	Crispa Denims	The Mythical Second Team was first awarded in 1984.		
1977	Guard	Robert Jaworski*	Toyota Tamaraws	The Mythical Second Team was first awarded in 1984.		
1977	Guard	Atoy Co* (3)	Crispa Redmanizers	The Mythical Second Team was first awarded in 1984.		
1977	Center	Ramon Fernandez* (2)	Toyota Tamaraws	The Mythical Second Team was first awarded in 1984.		
1977	Forward	**Freddie Hubalde***	Crispa Redmanizers	The Mythical Second Team was first awarded in 1984.		
1977	Forward	Jun Papa	Mariwasa Panthers	The Mythical Second Team was first awarded in 1984.		
1978	Guard	**Robert Jaworski*** (2)	Toyota Tamaraws	The Mythical Second Team was first awarded in 1984.		
1978	Guard	Lim Eng Beng*	U/Tex Wranglers	The Mythical Second Team was first awarded in 1984.		
1978	Center	Ramon Fernandez* (3)	Toyota Tamaraws	The Mythical Second Team was first awarded in 1984.		
1978	Forward	Freddie Hubalde* (2)	Crispa Redmanizers	The Mythical Second Team was first awarded in 1984.		
1978	Forward	Philip Cezar* (2)	Crispa Redmanizers	The Mythical Second Team was first awarded in 1984.		
1979	Guard	Robert Jaworski* (3)	Toyota Tamaraws	The Mythical Second Team was first awarded in 1984.		
1979	Guard	**Atoy Co*** (4)	Crispa Redmanizers	The Mythical Second Team was first awarded in 1984.		
1979	Center	Ramon Fernandez* (4)	Toyota Tamaraws	The Mythical Second Team was first awarded in 1984.		
1979	Forward	Arnie Tuadles	Toyota Tamaraws	The Mythical Second Team was first awarded in 1984.		
1979	Forward	Philip Cezar* (3)	Crispa Redmanizers	The Mythical Second Team was first awarded in 1984.		
1980	Guard	Robert Jaworski* (4)	Toyota Tamaraws	The Mythical Second Team was first awarded in 1984.		
1980	Guard	Atoy Co* (5)	Crispa Redmanizers	The Mythical Second Team was first awarded in 1984.		
1980	Center	Ramon Fernandez* (5)	Toyota Tamaraws	The Mythical Second Team was first awarded in 1984.		
1980	Forward	Bogs Adornado* (3)	U/Tex Wranglers	The Mythical Second Team was first awarded in 1984.		
1980	Forward	**Philip Cezar*** (4)	Crispa Redmanizers	The Mythical Second Team was first awarded in 1984.		
1981	Guard	Robert Jaworski* (5)	Toyota Super Diesels	The Mythical Second Team was first awarded in 1984.		
1981	Guard	Atoy Co* (6)	Crispa Redmanizers	The Mythical Second Team was first awarded in 1984.		
1981	Center	Ramon Fernandez* (6)	Toyota Super Diesels	The Mythical Second Team was first awarded in 1984.		
1981	Forward	**Bogs Adornado*** (4)	U-Tex Wranglers	The Mythical Second Team was first awarded in 1984.		
1981	Forward	Philip Cezar* (5)	Crispa Redmanizers	The Mythical Second Team was first awarded in 1984.		
1982	Guard	Francis Arnaiz* (3)	Toyota Super Corollas	The Mythical Second Team was first awarded in 1984.		
1982	Guard	Atoy Co* (7)	Crispa Redmanizers	The Mythical Second Team was first awarded in 1984.		
1982	Center	**Ramon Fernandez*** (7)	Toyota Super Corollas	The Mythical Second Team was first awarded in 1984.		
1982	Forward	Bogs Adornado* (5)	U/Tex Wranglers	The Mythical Second Team was first awarded in 1984.		
1982	Forward	Abe King	Toyota Super Corollas	The Mythical Second Team was first awarded in 1984.		
1983	Guard	Ricardo Brown*	Great Taste Coffee Makers	The Mythical Second Team was first awarded in 1984.		
1983	Guard	Atoy Co* (8)	Crispa Redmanizers	The Mythical Second Team was first awarded in 1984.		
1983	Center	**Abet Guidaben***	Crispa Redmanizers	The Mythical Second Team was first awarded in 1984.		
1983	Forward	Bogs Adornado* (6)	Great Taste Coffee Makers	The Mythical Second Team was first awarded in 1984.		
1983	Forward	Philip Cezar* (6)	Crispa Redmanizers	The Mythical Second Team was first awarded in 1984.		
1984	Guard	Ricardo Brown* (2)	Great Taste Coffee Makers	Bernie Fabiosa	Crispa Redmanizers	
1984	Guard	Atoy Co* (9)	Crispa Redmanizers	Willie Pearson	Crispa Redmanizers	
1984	Center	Abet Guidaben* (2)	Crispa Redmanizers	Terry Saldaña	Gilbey's Gin Tonics	
1984	Forward	**Ramon Fernandez*** (8)	Beer Hausen Brewmasters	Bogs Adornado* (7)	Great Taste Coffee Makers	
1984	Forward	Manny Victorino	Great Taste Coffee Makers	Philip Cezar* (7)	Crispa Redmanizers	
1985	Guard	**Ricardo Brown*** (3)	Great Taste Coffee Makers	Willie Generalao	Tanduay Rhum Makers	
1985	Guard	Willie Pearson (2)	Great Taste Coffee Makers	Robert Jaworski* (6)	Ginebra San Miguel	
1985	Center	Abet Guidaben* (3)	Manila Beer Brewmasters	Ramon Fernandez* (9)	Tanduay Rhum Makers	
1985	Forward	Bogs Adornado* (8)	Shell Azodrin Bugbusters	Philip Cezar* (8)	Shell Azodrin Bugbusters	
1985	Forward	Manny Victorino (2)	Great Taste Coffee Makers	Abe King (2)	Great Taste Coffee Makers	
1986	Guard	Robert Jaworski* (7)	Ginebra San Miguel	Chito Loyzaga	Ginebra San Miguel	
1986	Guard	Ricardo Brown* (4)	Great Taste Coffee Makers	Padim Israel	Tanduay Rhum Makers	
1986	Center	**Ramon Fernandez*** (10)	Tanduay Rhum Makers	Terry Saldaña (2)	Ginebra San Miguel	
1986	Forward	Freddie Hubalde* (3)	Tanduay Rhum Makers	JB Yango	Tanduay Rhum Makers	
1986	Forward	Manny Victorino (3)	Great Taste Coffee Makers	Dondon Ampalayo	Ginebra San Miguel	
1987	Guard	Hector Calma*	San Miguel Beermen	Ricardo Brown* (5)	Great Taste Coffee Makers	
1987	Guard	Allan Caidic*	Great Taste Coffee Makers	Arnie Tuadles (2)	Great Taste Coffee Makers	
1987	Center	**Abet Guidaben*** (4)	San Miguel Beermen	Ramon Fernandez* (11)	Tanduay Rhum Makers	
1987	Forward	Philip Cezar* (9)	Great Taste Coffee Makers	Bernardo Carpio	Great Taste Coffee Makers	
1987	Forward	Elpidio Villamin	Hills Bros. Coffee Kings	Ricky Relosa	Hills Bros. Coffee Kings	
1988	Guard	Hector Calma* (2)	San Miguel Beermen	Robert Jaworski* (8)	Añejo Rum 65ers	
1988	Guard	Ricardo Brown* (6)	San Miguel Beermen	Jojo Lastimosa	Purefoods Hotdogs	
1988	Center	Abet Guidaben* (5)	Purefoods Hotdogs	Jerry Codiñera	Purefoods Hotdogs	
1988	Forward	Allan Caidic* (2)	Presto Ice Cream Makers	Dondon Ampalayo (2)	Añejo Rum 65ers	
1988	Forward	**Ramon Fernandez*** (12)	San Miguel Beermen	Elpidio Villamin (2)	Alaska Milkmen	
1989	Guard	Hector Calma* (3)	San Miguel Beermen	Elmer Reyes	San Miguel Beermen	
1989	Guard	Allan Caidic* (3)	Presto Tivolis	Ronnie Magsanoc*	Formula Shell Zoom Masters	
1989	Center	**Benjie Paras***	Formula Shell Zoom Masters	Jerry Codiñera (2)	Purefoods Hotdogs	
1989	Forward	Alvin Patrimonio*	Purefoods Hotdogs	Paul Alvarez	Alaska Milkmen	
1989	Forward	Ramon Fernandez* (13)	San Miguel Beermen	Alvin Teng	San Miguel Beermen	
1990	Guard	Ronnie Magsanoc* (2)	Formula Shell Zoom Masters	Samboy Lim*	San Miguel Beermen	
1990	Guard	Paul Alvarez (2)	Alaska Milkmen	Rudy Distrito	Añejo Rum 65ers	
1990	Center	Benjie Paras* (2)	Formula Shell Zoom Masters	Ramon Fernandez* (14)	San Miguel Beermen	
1990	Forward	**Allan Caidic*** (4)	Presto Tivolis	Elpidio Villamin (3)	Alaska Milkmen	
1990	Forward	Alvin Patrimonio* (2)	Purefoods Hotdogs	Rey Cuenco	Añejo Rum 65ers	
1991	Guard	Jojo Lastimosa (2)	Alaska Milkmen	Ronnie Magsanoc* (3)	Shell Rimula X	
1991	Guard	Allan Caidic* (5)	Tivoli Milkmasters	Ato Agustin	San Miguel Beermen	
1991	Center	Benjie Paras* (3)	Shell Rimula X	Jerry Codiñera (3)	Purefoods Tender Juicy Hotdogs	
1991	Forward	**Alvin Patrimonio*** (3)	Purefoods Tender Juicy Hotdogs	Alvin Teng (2)	San Miguel Beermen	
1991	Forward	Ramon Fernandez* (15)	San Miguel Beermen	Elpidio Villamin (4)	Diet Sarsi Sizzlers	
1992	Guard	**Ato Agustin** (2)	San Miguel Beermen	Ronnie Magsanoc* (4)	Shell Rimula X	
1992	Guard	Al Solis	Swift Mighty Meaties	Elmer Cabahug	Purefoods Tender Juicy Hotdogs	
1992	Center	Ramon Fernandez* (16)	San Miguel Beermen	Jerry Codiñera (4)	Purefoods Tender Juicy Hotdogs	
1992	Forward	Alvin Patrimonio* (4)	Purefoods Tender Juicy Hotdogs	Alvin Teng (3)	San Miguel Beermen	
1992	Forward	Nelson Asaytono	Swift Mighty Meaties	Benjie Paras* (4)	Shell Rimula X	
1993	Guard	Ato Agustin (3)	San Miguel Beermen	Samboy Lim* [2]	San Miguel Beermen	
1993	Guard	Al Solis (2)	Swift Mighty Meaties	Allan Caidic* (6)	San Miguel Beermen	
1993	Center	Jerry Codiñera (5)	Purefoods Tender Juicy Hotdogs	Jun Limpot	Sta. Lucia Realtors	
1993	Forward	**Alvin Patrimonio*** (5)	Purefoods Tender Juicy Hotdogs	Vergel Meneses	Swift Mighty Meaties	
1993	Forward	Nelson Asaytono (2)	Swift Mighty Meaties	Alvin Teng (4)	San Miguel Beermen	
1994	Guard	Johnny Abarrientos	Alaska Milkmen	Boybits Victoria	Swift Mighty Meaties	
1994	Guard	Ato Agustin (4)	San Miguel Beermen	Allan Caidic* (7)	San Miguel Beermen	
1994	Center	Jerry Codiñera (6)	Purefoods Tender Juicy Hotdogs	Benjie Paras* (5)	Shell Rimula X	
1994	Forward	Vergel Meneses (2)	Swift Mighty Meaties	Nelson Asaytono (3)	Swift Mighty Meaties	
1994	Forward	**Alvin Patrimonio*** (6)	Purefoods Tender Juicy Hotdogs	Bong Hawkins	Alaska Milkmen	
1995	Guard	Johnny Abarrientos (2)	Alaska Milkmen	Boybits Victoria (2)	Sunkist Orange Juicers	
1995	Guard	Allan Caidic* (8)	San Miguel Beermen	Jojo Lastimosa (3)	Alaska Milkmen	
1995	Center	Benjie Paras* (6)	Formula Shell Gas Kings	Bonel Balingit	Sunkist Orange Juicers	
1995	Forward	**Vergel Meneses** (3)	Sunkist Orange Juicers	Alvin Patrimonio* (7)	Purefoods Tender Juicy Hotdogs	
1995	Forward	Bong Hawkins (2)	Alaska Milkmen	Nelson Asaytono (4)	Sunkist Orange Juicers	
1996	Guard	**Johnny Abarrientos** (3)	Alaska Milkmen	Bal David	Ginebra San Miguel	
1996	Guard	Jojo Lastimosa (4)	Alaska Milkmen	Jeffrey Cariaso	Alaska Milkmen	
1996	Center	Marlou Aquino	Ginebra San Miguel	Benjie Paras* (7)	Formula Shell Zoom Masters	
1996	Forward	Alvin Patrimonio* (8)	Purefoods Tender Juicy Hotdogs	Noli Locsin	Ginebra San Miguel	
1996	Forward	Bong Hawkins (3)	Alaska Milkmen	Nelson Asaytono (5)	San Miguel Beermen	
1997	Guard	Johnny Abarrientos (4)	Alaska Milkmen	Dindo Pumaren	Purefoods Carne Norte Beefies	
1997	Guard	Vince Hizon	Gordon's Gin Boars	Bong Ravena	Purefoods Carne Norte Beefies	
1997	Center	Marlou Aquino (2)	Gordon's Gin Boars	Jerry Codiñera (7)	Purefoods Carne Norte Beefies	
1997	Forward	**Alvin Patrimonio*** (9)	Purefoods Carne Norte Beefies	Noli Locsin (2)	Gordon's Gin Boars	
1997	Forward	Nelson Asaytono (6)	San Miguel Beermen	Jun Limpot (2)	Sta. Lucia Realtors	
1998	Guard	Johnny Abarrientos (5)	Alaska Milkmen	Olsen Racela	San Miguel Beermen	
1998	Guard	Jojo Lastimosa (5)	Alaska Milkmen	Mike Mustre	San Miguel Beermen	
1998	Center	Jerry Codiñera (8)	Purefoods Tender Juicy Hotdogs	Danny Ildefonso	San Miguel Beermen	
1998	Forward	**Kenneth Duremdes**	Alaska Milkmen	Victor Pablo	Formula Shell Super Unleaded	
1998	Forward	Alvin Patrimonio (10)	Purefoods Tender Juicy Hotdogs	Nelson Asaytono (7)	San Miguel Beermen	
1999	Guard	Johnny Abarrientos (6)	Alaska Milkmen	Olsen Racela (2)	San Miguel Beermen	
1999	Guard	Jeffrey Cariaso (2)	Mobiline Phone Pals	Jojo Lastimosa (6)	Alaska Milkmen	
1999	Center	Sonny Alvarado	Tanduay Rhum Masters	Danny Ildefonso (2)	San Miguel Beermen	
1999	Forward	Danny Seigle	San Miguel Beermen	Kenneth Duremdes (2)	Alaska Milkmen	
1999	Forward	**Benjie Paras*** (8)	Shell Velocity	Eric Menk	Tanduay Rhum Masters	
2000	Guard	Olsen Racela (3)	San Miguel Beermen	Dindo Pumaren (2)	Purefoods Tender Juicy Hotdogs	
2000	Guard	Kenneth Duremdes (3)	Alaska Milkmen	Jeffrey Cariaso (3)	Tanduay Rhum Masters	
2000	Center	**Danny Ildefonso** (3)	San Miguel Beermen	Marlou Aquino (3)	Sta. Lucia Realtors	
2000	Forward	Danny Seigle (2)	San Miguel Beermen	Rudy Hatfield	Tanduay Rhum Masters	
2000	Forward	Alvin Patrimonio* (11)	Purefoods Tender Juicy Hotdogs	Bong Hawkins (4)	Alaska Milkmen	
2001	Guard	Olsen Racela (4)	San Miguel Beermen	Noy Castillo	Purefoods Tender Juicy Hotdogs	
2001	Guard	Danny Seigle (3)	San Miguel Beermen	Kenneth Duremdes (4)	Alaska Aces	
2001	Center	**Danny Ildefonso** (4)	San Miguel Beermen	Davonn Harp	Batang Red Bull Thunder	
2001	Forward	Ali Peek	Alaska Aces	Rudy Hatfield (2)	Pop Cola Panthers	
2001	Forward	Dennis Espino	Sta. Lucia Realtors	Nic Belasco	San Miguel Beermen	
2002	Guard	**Willie Miller**	Batang Red Bull Thunder	Gilbert Demape	Talk 'N Text Phone Pals	
2002	Guard	Jeffrey Cariaso (4)	Coca-Cola Tigers	Rey Evangelista	Purefoods Tender Juicy Hotdogs	
2002	Center	Davonn Harp (2)	Batang Red Bull Thunder	Asi Taulava	Talk 'N Text Phone Pals	
2002	Forward	Victor Pablo (2)	Talk 'N Text Phone Pals	Nic Belasco (2)	San Miguel Beermen	
2002	Forward	Don Allado	Alaska Aces	Kerby Raymundo	Purefoods Tender Juicy Hotdogs	
2003	Guard	Jimmy Alapag	Talk 'N Text Phone Pals	Johnny Abarrientos (7)	Coca-Cola Tigers	
2003	Guard	Jeffrey Cariaso (5)	Coca-Cola Tigers	John Arigo	Alaska Aces	
2003	Center	**Asi Taulava** (2)	Talk 'N Text Phone Pals	Marlou Aquino (4)	Sta. Lucia Realtors	
2003	Forward	Rudy Hatfield (3)	Coca-Cola Tigers	Harvey Carey	Talk 'N Text Phone Pals	
2003	Forward	Dennis Espino (2)	Sta. Lucia Realtors	Don Allado (2)	Alaska Aces	
2004–05	Guard	Jimmy Alapag (2)	Talk 'N Text Phone Pals	Olsen Racela (5)	San Miguel Beermen	
2004–05	Guard	Willie Miller (2)	Talk 'N Text Phone Pals	Mark Caguioa	Barangay Ginebra Kings	
2004–05	Center	Dorian Peña	San Miguel Beermen	Rommel Adducul	Barangay Ginebra Kings	
2004–05	Forward	Nic Belasco (3)	San Miguel Beermen	Tony dela Cruz	Shell Turbo Chargers	
2004–05	Forward	**Eric Menk** (2)	Barangay Ginebra Kings	Mark Telan	Talk 'N Text Phone Pals	
2005–06	Guard	Roger Yap	Purefoods Chunkee Giants	Mike Cortez	Alaska Aces	
2005–06	Guard	**James Yap**^	Purefoods Chunkee Giants	Mark Caguioa (2)	Barangay Ginebra Kings	
2005–06	Center	Enrico Villanueva	Red Bull Barako	Dorian Peña (2)	San Miguel Beermen	
2005–06	Forward	Lordy Tugade	Red Bull Barako	Danny Seigle (4)	San Miguel Beermen	
2005–06	Forward	Kerby Raymundo (2)	Purefoods Chunkee Giants	Marc Pingris	Purefoods Chunkee Giants	
2006–07	Guard	**Willie Miller** (3)	Alaska Aces	Wynne Arboleda	Air21 Express	
2006–07	Guard	Gary David	Air21 Express	Mark Cardona	Talk 'N Text Phone Pals	
2006–07	Center	Dorian Peña (3)	San Miguel Beermen	Yancy de Ocampo	Talk 'N Text Phone Pals	
2006–07	Forward	Kelly Williams^	Sta. Lucia Realtors	Arwind Santos	Air21 Express	
2006–07	Forward	Jay Washington	Talk 'N Text Phone Pals	Danny Ildefonso (5)	San Miguel Beermen	
2007–08	Guard	Jayjay Helterbrand	Barangay Ginebra Kings	Willie Miller (4)	Alaska Aces	
2007–08	Guard	Mark Caguioa (3)	Barangay Ginebra Kings	Cyrus Baguio	Red Bull Barako	
2007–08	Center	Asi Taulava (3)	Coca-Cola Tigers	Sonny Thoss	Alaska Aces	
2007–08	Forward	Arwind Santos (2)	Air21 Express	Nelbert Omolon	Sta. Lucia Realtors	
2007–08	Forward	**Kelly Williams^** (2)	Sta. Lucia Realtors	Kerby Raymundo (3)	Purefoods Tender Juicy Giants	
2008–09	Guard	**Jayjay Helterbrand** (2)	Barangay Ginebra Kings	Willie Miller (5)	Alaska Aces	
2008–09	Guard	Mark Cardona (2)	Talk 'N Text Tropang Texters	Dondon Hontiveros	San Miguel Beermen	
2008–09	Center	Asi Taulava (4)	Coca-Cola Tigers	Jay-R Reyes	Rain or Shine Elasto Painters	
2008–09	Forward	Arwind Santos (3)	Burger King Whoppers	Gabe Norwood	Rain or Shine Elasto Painters	
2008–09	Forward	Jay Washington (2)	San Miguel Beermen	Kelly Williams^ (3)	Sta. Lucia Realtors	
2009–10	Guard	LA Tenorio	Alaska Aces	Roger Yap (2)	B-Meg Derby Ace Llamados	
2009–10	Guard	**James Yap** (2)	B-Meg Derby Ace Llamados	Mark Cardona (3)	Talk 'N Text Tropang Texters	
2009–10	Center	Sonny Thoss (2)	Alaska Aces	Asi Taulava (5)	Coca-Cola Tigers	
2009–10	Forward	Arwind Santos (4)	San Miguel Beermen	Kelly Williams^ (4)	Talk 'N Text Tropang Texters	
2009–10	Forward	Jay Washington (3)	San Miguel Beermen	Joe Devance	Alaska Aces	
2010–11	Guard	**Jimmy Alapag** (3)	Talk 'N Text Tropang Texters	Jayson Castro^	Talk 'N Text Tropang Texters	
2010–11	Guard	Mark Caguioa (4)	Barangay Ginebra Kings	James Yap (3)	B-Meg Llamados	
2010–11	Center	Sonny Thoss (3)	Alaska Aces	Ali Peek (2)	Talk 'N Text Tropang Texters	
2010–11	Forward	Arwind Santos (5)	Petron Blaze Boosters	Joe Devance (2)	B-Meg Llamados	
2010–11	Forward	Kelly Williams^ (5)	Talk 'N Text Tropang Texters	Jay Washington (4)	Petron Blaze Boosters	
2011–12	Guard	**Mark Caguioa** (5)	Barangay Ginebra Kings	Jayson Castro^ (2)	Talk 'N Text Tropang Texters	
2011–12	Guard	Gary David (2)	Powerade Tigers	Paul Lee^	Rain or Shine Elasto Painters	
2011–12	Center	Ranidel de Ocampo	Talk 'N Text Tropang Texters	Sonny Thoss (4)	Alaska Aces	
2011–12	Forward	James Yap (4)	B-Meg Llamados	Jeff Chan	Rain or Shine Elasto Painters	
2011–12	Forward	Arwind Santos (6)	Petron Blaze Boosters	Kelly Williams^ (6)	Talk 'N Text Tropang Texters	
2012–13	Guard	LA Tenorio (2)	Barangay Ginebra San Miguel	Alex Cabagnot	Petron Blaze Boosters	
2012–13	Guard	Jayson Castro^ (3)	Talk 'N Text Tropang Texters	Cyrus Baguio (2)	Alaska Aces	
2012–13	Center	Ranidel de Ocampo (2)	Talk 'N Text Tropang Texters	June Mar Fajardo^	Petron Blaze Boosters	
2012–13	Forward	Calvin Abueva^	Alaska Aces	Marc Pingris (2)	San Mig Coffee Mixers	
2012–13	Forward	**Arwind Santos** (7)	Petron Blaze Boosters	Sonny Thoss (5)	Alaska Aces	
2013–14	Guard	Jayson Castro^ (4)	Talk 'N Text Tropang Texters	Paul Lee^ (2)	Rain or Shine Elasto Painters	
2013–14	Guard	Mark Barroca^	San Mig Super Coffee Mixers	Peter June Simon	San Mig Super Coffee Mixers	
2013–14	Center	**June Mar Fajardo**^ (2)	San Miguel Beermen	Greg Slaughter	Barangay Ginebra San Miguel	
2013–14	Forward	Ranidel de Ocampo (3)	Talk 'N Text Tropang Texters	Marc Pingris (3)	San Mig Super Coffee Mixers	
2013–14	Forward	Asi Taulava (6)	Air21 Express	Sonny Thoss (6)	Alaska Aces	
2014–15	Guard	Jayson Castro^ (5)	Talk 'N Text Tropang Texters	Terrence Romeo	GlobalPort Batang Pier	
2014–15	Guard	Paul Lee^ (3)	Rain or Shine Elasto Painters	Stanley Pringle^	GlobalPort Batang Pier	
2014–15	Center	Greg Slaughter (2)	Barangay Ginebra San Miguel	Asi Taulava (7)	NLEX Road Warriors	
2014–15	Center/Forward (Note: Fajardo primarily plays as center, while de Ocampo primarily plays as forward)	**June Mar Fajardo**^ (3)	San Miguel Beermen	Ranidel de Ocampo (4)	Talk 'N Text Tropang Texters	
2014–15	Forward	Arwind Santos (8)	San Miguel Beermen	Calvin Abueva^ (2)	Alaska Aces	
2015–16	Guard	Jayson Castro^ (6)	TNT KaTropa	LA Tenorio (3)	Barangay Ginebra San Miguel	
2015–16	Guard	Terrence Romeo (2)	GlobalPort Batang Pier	Alex Cabagnot (2)	San Miguel Beermen	
2015–16	Center	**June Mar Fajardo**^ (4)	San Miguel Beermen	Asi Taulava (8)	NLEX Road Warriors	
2015–16	Forward	Calvin Abueva^ (3)	Alaska Aces	Sean Anthony	NLEX Road Warriors	
2015–16	Forward	Arwind Santos (9)	San Miguel Beermen	Japeth Aguilar^	Barangay Ginebra San Miguel	
2016–17	Guard	Chris Ross^	San Miguel Beermen	LA Tenorio (4)	Barangay Ginebra San Miguel	
2016–17	Guard	Alex Cabagnot (3)	San Miguel Beermen	Jayson Castro^ (7)	TNT KaTropa	
2016–17	Center	**June Mar Fajardo**^ (5)	San Miguel Beermen	Kelly Williams^ (7)	TNT KaTropa	
2016–17	Forward	Arwind Santos (10)	San Miguel Beermen	Cliff Hodge^	Meralco Bolts	
2016–17	Forward	Japeth Aguilar^ (2)	Barangay Ginebra San Miguel	Joe Devance (3)	Barangay Ginebra San Miguel	
2017–18	Guard	Stanley Pringle^ (2)	NorthPort Batang Pier	Mark Barroca^ (2)	Magnolia Hotshots Pambansang Manok	
2017–18	Guard	Paul Lee^ (4)	Magnolia Hotshots Pambansang Manok	Scottie Thompson^	Barangay Ginebra San Miguel	
2017–18	Center	**June Mar Fajardo**^ (6)	San Miguel Beermen	Poy Erram^	Blackwater Elite	
2017–18	Forward	Marcio Lassiter^	San Miguel Beermen	Matthew Wright	Phoenix Fuel Masters	
2017–18	Forward	Japeth Aguilar^ (3)	Barangay Ginebra San Miguel	Arwind Santos (11)	San Miguel Beermen	
2019	Guard	Jayson Castro^ (8)	TNT KaTropa	Stanley Pringle^ (3)	Barangay Ginebra San Miguel	
2019	Guard	CJ Perez^	Columbian Dyip	Roger Pogoy^	TNT KaTropa	
2019	Center	**June Mar Fajardo**^ (7)	San Miguel Beermen	Japeth Aguilar^ (4)	Barangay Ginebra San Miguel	
2019	Forward	Sean Anthony (2)	NorthPort Batang Pier	Troy Rosario^	TNT KaTropa	
2019	Forward	Christian Standhardinger	NorthPort Batang Pier	Ian Sangalang^	Magnolia Hotshots Pambansang Manok	
2020 (Note: The 2020 season only had one conference. The award was named as "Elite Five" for this season.)	Guard	Stanley Pringle^ (4)	Barangay Ginebra San Miguel	No second team awarded this season.		
2020	Guard	Matthew Wright (2)	Phoenix Super LPG Fuel Masters	No second team awarded this season.		
2020	Center	Japeth Aguilar^ (5)	Barangay Ginebra San Miguel	No second team awarded this season.		
2020	Forward	Calvin Abueva^ (4)	Phoenix Super LPG Fuel Masters	No second team awarded this season.		
2020	Forward	Poy Erram^ (2)	TNT Tropang Giga	No second team awarded this season.		
2021	Guard	Mikey Williams^	TNT Tropang Giga	Robert Bolick^	NorthPort Batang Pier	
2021	Guard	**Scottie Thompson**^ (2)	Barangay Ginebra San Miguel	CJ Perez^ (2)	San Miguel Beermen	
2021	Center	June Mar Fajardo^ (8)	San Miguel Beermen	Ian Sangalang^ (2)	Magnolia Pambansang Manok Hotshots	
2021	Forward	Calvin Abueva^ (5)	Magnolia Pambansang Manok Hotshots	Matthew Wright (3)	Phoenix Super LPG Fuel Masters	
2021	Forward	Arwind Santos (12)	NorthPort Batang Pier	Christian Standhardinger (2)	Barangay Ginebra San Miguel	
2022–23	Guard	Scottie Thompson^ (3)	Barangay Ginebra San Miguel	Robert Bolick^ (2)	NorthPort Batang Pier	
2022–23	Guard	CJ Perez^ (3)	San Miguel Beermen	Mikey Williams (2)	TNT Tropang Giga	
2022–23	Center/forward (Note: Fajardo primarily plays as center, while Abueva primarily plays as forward)	**June Mar Fajardo**^ (9)	San Miguel Beermen	Calvin Abueva^ (6)	Magnolia Chicken Timplados Hotshots	
2022–23	Forward	Jamie Malonzo	Barangay Ginebra San Miguel	Calvin Oftana^	TNT Tropang Giga	
2022–23	Forward	Christian Standhardinger (3)	Barangay Ginebra San Miguel	Arvin Tolentino	NorthPort Batang Pier	
2023–24	Guard	Chris Newsome^	Meralco Bolts	Stephen Holt^	Terrafirma Dyip	
2023–24	Guard	CJ Perez^ (4)	San Miguel Beermen	Juami Tiongson^	Terrafirma Dyip	
2023–24	Center/forward (Note: Fajardo primarily plays as center, while Perkins primarily plays as forward)	**June Mar Fajardo**^ (10)	San Miguel Beermen	Jason Perkins^	Phoenix Fuel Masters	
2023–24	Forward	Arvin Tolentino (2)	NorthPort Batang Pier	Calvin Oftana^ (2)	TNT Tropang Giga	
2023–24	Forward	Christian Standhardinger (4)	Barangay Ginebra San Miguel	Cliff Hodge^ (2)	Meralco Bolts	
2024–25	Guard	Robert Bolick^ (3)	NLEX Road Warriors	Scottie Thompson^ (4)	Barangay Ginebra San Miguel	
2024–25	Guard	CJ Perez^ (5)	San Miguel Beermen	Roger Pogoy^ (2)	TNT Tropang 5G	
2024–25	Center	**June Mar Fajardo**^ (11)	San Miguel Beermen	Japeth Aguilar^ (6)	Barangay Ginebra San Miguel	
2024–25	Center/forward (Note: Oftana primarily plays as forward while Arana primarily plays as center)	Calvin Oftana^ (3)	TNT Tropang 5G	Justin Arana^	Converge FiberXers	
2024–25	Forward	Arvin Tolentino (3)	NorthPort Batang Pier	Zavier Lucero^	Magnolia Chicken Timplados Hotshots	

== Most selections ==
The following table only lists players with at least five total selections.

*	Denotes players inducted to the PBA Hall of Fame
^	Denotes players who are still active

Player	Total	First Team	Second Team	MVP
Ramon Fernandez*	16	13	3	4
Arwind Santos	12	10	2	1
June Mar Fajardo^	11	10	1	9
Alvin Patrimonio*	11	10	1	4
Atoy Co*	9	9	0	1
Philip Cezar*	9	7	2	1
Bogs Adornado*	8	7	1	3
Allan Caidic*	8	6	2	1
Robert Jaworski*	8	6	2	1
Benjie Paras*	8	5	3	2
Jayson Castro^	8	5	3	0
Asi Taulava	8	4	4	1
Jerry Codiñera	8	3	5	0
Johnny Abarrientos	7	6	1	1
Kelly Williams^	7	3	4	1
Nelson Asaytono	7	3	4	0
Ricardo Brown*	6	5	1	1
Calvin Abueva^	6	4	2	0
Japeth Aguilar^	6	3	3	0
Jojo Lastimosa	6	3	3	0
Sonny Thoss	6	2	4	0
Abet Guidaben*	5	5	0	2
CJ Perez^	5	4	1	0
Willie Miller	5	3	2	2
Mark Caguioa	5	3	2	1
Jeffrey Cariaso	5	3	2	0
Danny Ildefonso	5	2	3	2
Olsen Racela	5	2	3	0
