= Fort Acuña =

Filipino basketball player and coach

Personal information
- Born: April 17, 1948 Philippines
- Died: July 6, 1981 (aged 33)
- Listed height: 6 ft 1 in (1.85 m)
- Listed weight: 185 lb (84 kg)

Career information
- College: UP
- PBA draft: 1975 Elevated
- Drafted by: Toyota Comets
- Playing career: 1975–1978
- Position: Center / forward
- Number: 17

Career history

Playing
- 1975–1978: Toyota

Coaching
- 1978–1979: Toyota (assistant)
- 1979–1980: Toyota

Career highlights
- As player: PBA champion (1975 Open, 1975 All-Filipino, 1977 Invitational, 1978 All-Filipino); As head coach: PBA champion (1979 Invitational)

Fortunato "Fort" Acuña (April 17, 1948 – July 6, 1981) was a Filipino professional basketball player and coach.

A 6'1" center/forward, he played for the UP Fighting Maroons in the UAAP. In the MICAA, Acuña played for the Meralco Reddy Kilowatts until it disbanded in 1972. He joined the newly formed Toyota Comets in 1973, along with Meralco teammates Alberto Reynoso, Orlando Bauzon, Robert Jaworski and Francis Arnaiz. He continued with the Toyota team when the franchise transferred to the Philippine Basketball Association in 1975.

Acuña retired from active play after the 1978 PBA All-Filipino Conference and began serving as assistant coach for Toyota. On December 11 1979, he replaced Dante Silverio as Toyota head coach after Silverio resigned when management decided to reinstate Ramon Fernandez, Ernesto Estrada and Abe King for Game 2 of the ongoing PBA Invitational Conference finals. Acuña steered the team to the title against arch-rivals Crispa. This was Toyota's sixth title and Acuña's only PBA championship as head coach.

On December 11, 1980, Toyota was playing against the Crispa in Game 3 of the 1980 PBA All-Filipino Conference finals. During half time, Acuña was fired by team manager Pablo Carlos Jr. for refusing to heed his request to field Robert Jaworski. Toyota won that game, preventing a Crispa sweep of the tournament. The Redmanizers would eventually clinch the title by wrapping up the series the following game.

Acuña committed suicide on July 6, 1981, by ingesting a lethal dose of insecticide. The following day, Toyota had a scheduled game against Crispa during the semi-final round of the 1981 PBA Open Conference. The team appeared for the game with a piece of black stripe on their jerseys as a sign of mourning. Seemingly affected by the shocking news, the Super Diesels lost to the Redmanizers, 133-118.
