= Robert Jaworski =

Filipino senator, basketball coach and basketball player

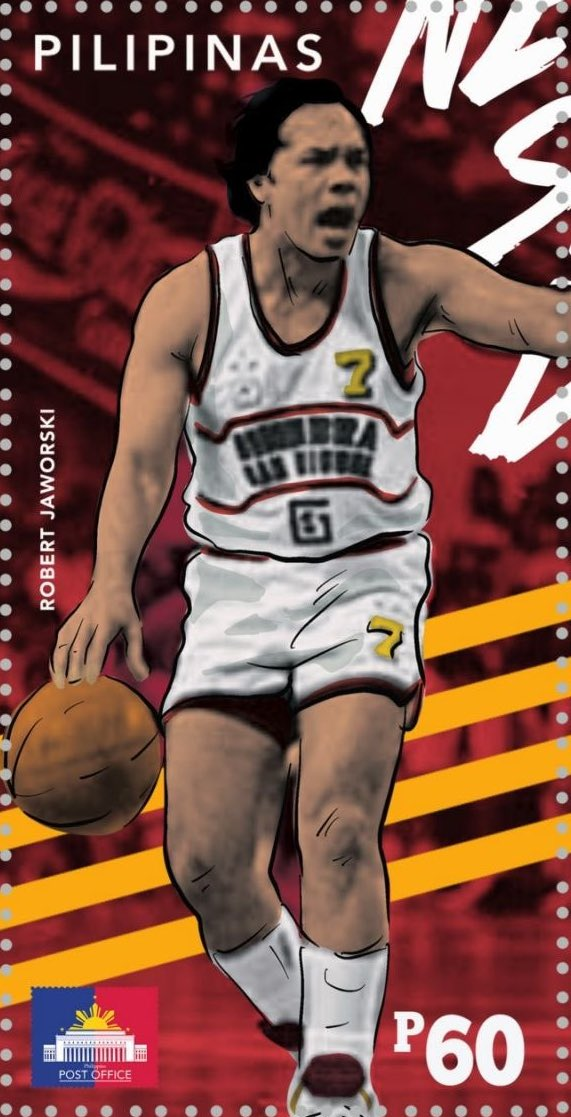
- Jaworski on a 2021 stamp of the Philippines

Senator of the Philippines
- In office June 30, 1998 – June 30, 2004

Personal details
- Born: Robert Vincent Salazar Jaworski; March 8, 1946 (age 80) Baguio, Mountain Province, Commonwealth of the Philippines
- Party: Lakas (2001–present)
- Other political affiliations: PMP (1997–2001)
- Spouse: Evelyn Bautista
- Children: 4, including Robert Jr.
- Basketball career

Personal information
- Listed height: 6 ft 1 in (1.85 m)
- Listed weight: 192 lb (87 kg)

Career information
- High school: Manuel A. Roxas High School
- College: UE (1962–1966)
- PBA draft: 1975 Elevated
- Drafted by: Toyota Comets
- Playing career: 1967–1998
- Position: Point guard
- Number: 7
- Coaching career: 1984–1998

Career history

Playing
- 1967–1968: YCO Painters
- 1968–1971: Meralco
- 1973–1984: Toyota
- 1984–1998: Ginebra San Miguel

Career highlights
- Career Highlights (PBA / UAAP): PBA Most Valuable Player (1978); 13× PBA champion (1975 First, 1975 Second, 1977 Invitational, 1978 All-Filipino, 1978 Invitational, 1979 Invitational, 1981 Open, 1982 Reinforced Filipino, 1982 Open, 1986 Open, 1988 All-Filipino, 1991 First, 1997 Commissioner's); 6× PBA Mythical First Team (1977–1981, 1986); 2× PBA Mythical Second Team (1985, 1988); 2× PBA All-Defensive Team (1985, 1988); 4× PBA All-Star (1989, 1990, 1991, 1992); 5× PBA All-Star Coach (1990–1992, 1996–1997); 50 Greatest Players in PBA History (2000 selection); PBA All-time leader in career assists; PBA Hall of Fame Class of 2005; 3x UAAP champion (1965, 1966, 1967); UAAP Most Valuable Player (1966); UAAP Rookie of the Year (1964); No. 7 retired by Barangay Ginebra San Miguel; PBA Lifetime Achievement Award
Medals
Men's basketball
Representing Philippines
ABC Championship
Gold medal – first place	1967 Seoul	Team
Bronze medal – third place	1969 Bangkok	Team
Silver medal – second place	1971 Tokyo	Team
Gold medal – first place	1973 Manila	Team
Head coach for Philippines
Asian Games
Silver medal – second place	1990 Beijing	Team

Robert Vincent Salazar Jaworski Sr. (Tagalog pronunciation: [dʒaˈwɔɾski]; born March 8, 1946), also known by his nicknames Sonny, Big J, and Jawo (Tagalog pronunciation: [dʒaˈwo]), is a Filipino former professional basketball player, head coach and politician who served as a senator of the Philippines from 1998 to 2004. He played 23 seasons in the Philippine Basketball Association (PBA). He is widely regarded as one of the best and most popular PBA players of all time. He was named part of the PBA's 40 Greatest Players and was inducted into the PBA Hall of Fame in 2005.

== Early life and college career ==
Robert Jaworski was born in Baguio on March 8, 1946. He was born to a Polish American father, Theodore Vincent Jaworski, and a Filipino mother of Ilocano descent, Iluminada Bautista Salazar, Jaworski grew up in Beata, Pandacan. In high school, he played other sports such as baseball and softball. He also represented his high school, Roxas High School, in swimming and track and field events during public school meets. Before finishing high school, he grew taller, which led to him pursuing basketball.

At first, Jaworski tried out for the FEU Tamaraws. However, the roster for FEU was already full. Turo Valenzona, a player on FEU, saw his potential to play multiple positions and recommended him to coach Baby Dalupan. In 1964, he played for the University of the East Red Warriors in the University Athletic Association of the Philippines (UAAP). Known as "Big Jack", at first he played as a center; at that time, being just over six feet tall was often tall enough to play that position. Playing under Dalupan, he led them to three straight titles from 1965 to 1967. He also led them to several National Seniors titles, a tournament where they competed not just against college athletes, but also against commercial teams, government-sponsored teams, and even teams sponsored by movie and recording companies.

== Basketball ==
=== Amateur ===
==== YCO Painters ====
In 1967, Jaworski joined the YCO Painters under coach Carlos Loyzaga in the now-defunct semi-pro league Manila Industrial and Commercial Athletic Association (MICAA). He played for YCO during the 1967 National Seniors and National Invitational, both of which were won by YCO. That year, he and veteran internationalist Narciso Bernardo were named as members of the Mythical Five.

==== Meralco Reddy Kilowatts ====
Jaworski then transferred to the newly formed Meralco Reddy Kilowatts (owned by public utility Meralco) in 1968 but was unable to play due to lack of release papers. He finally suited up for Meralco in 1970. He won the MVP award during the 1970 Presidential Cup.

In 1971, Jaworski was an MVP candidate once again, as he was the highest-scoring Filipino player with 15.2 points per game and also averaged 10.6 assists, 6.2 rebounds during the Reinforced (Open) Conference. During the All-Filipino Conference, he was averaging 15.7 points (eighth-best in the league), 10.1 assists (second only to YCO's Freddie Webb), 8.5 rebounds, and 3.0 steals (fifth-highest in the league) in eight games. On December 19, 1971, during a physical game between Meralco and the Crispa-Floro team, with Crispa up 65–50, he and Alberto "Big Boy" Reynoso assaulted two basketball officials, Eriberto Cruz and Jose Obias. Reynoso and Jaworski chased the two officials on the court and mauled them in front of the crowd. MICAA banned them for two years, but the Basketball Association of the Philippines (BAP) raised it to a lifetime ban.

In February 1973, both players were reinstated with the help of then-presidential assistant Guillermo de Vega. They played for Meralco for a final time during an exhibition match against the Japanese national team, which they won. Meralco then quietly disbanded, due to the incident and due to the Marcos government taking over the public utility.

It was also around this time when the nickname "Big J" was given to him by play-by-play commentator Willie Hernandez, resembling the "Big O" tag given to Oscar Robertson who Jaworski played like.

==== Komatsu / Toyota Comets ====
Jaworski and Reynoso, with other former Meralco players, Fort Acuña, Francis Arnaiz and Orlando Bauzon formed the core of the newly formed Komatsu Komets (later renamed the Toyota Comets). They first competed in National Seniors tournaments. He then led the Comets to the 1973 MICAA title. He would go on to play for them for 10 seasons, from 1973 to 1984.

=== Professional ===
==== Toyota (1975–1984) ====
Jaworski became a PBA player in 1975 after the Toyota Comets became one of the league's founding franchises when the league was formed the same year. Jaworski had for his original teammates Arnaiz, Reynoso, Reynoso's younger brother Cristino (Tino), Ramon Fernandez, Rodolfo "Ompong" Segura, Oscar Rocha, Joaquin "Jake" Rojas, and Orlando "Orly" Bauzon, along with imports Byron Jones and Stan Cherry. He later became the acknowledged leader of the team and a major player in Toyota's nine PBA championships. In that inaugural season, Toyota won two of the three conferences and finished second to Crispa in the third conference, coming close to a grand slam.

The following season, Reynoso and Jaworski separated ways when Reynoso joined the Mariwasa team. In the 1976 season, although they made it to the finals in all three conferences, Toyota did not win any titles, as Crispa won the grand slam.

The 1977 season was where Jaworski took on more of a leadership role. In the opening game of the season, Jaworski was among several players from both Crispa and Toyota who got into a massive brawl. The players were then detained in Fort Bonifacio. He led the team to a title in the 1977 Invitational over a guest team from Brazil.

Jaworski was named the league's Most Valuable Player in 1978. His MVP performance may arguably be considered as his best single season, averaging a career-high 20.2 points, 8.2 assists, 1.8 steals, and 10.2 rebounds per game. This was done despite the presence of tall imports with no height limit, and with Fernandez on the team.

Toyota made the 1980 Open Conference finals, but they lost to the U/Tex Wranglers in five games. In their matchup against Crispa during the 1980 All-Filipino Conference, Jaworski was benched in the first half. This led to their coach, Fort Acuña, to be fired at halftime. Team manager Don Pablo Carlos took over coaching duties. Jaworski then led Toyota to the comeback win. Although Crispa went on to win the title that conference, they were not able to sweep the tournament due to this loss.

Crispa and Toyota met one last time in the 1981 Open Conference finals. In that matchup, Jaworski was key to defending Atoy Co. Toyota won the series 3–2.

Throughout the 1982 season, Jaworski suffered multiple injuries, including a groin injury. He still made the All-Star team, but coached the team instead since he could not play. He averaged only 10.4 points, 4.9 assists and 4.8 rebounds, all PBA career-lows at the time. In his absence, Fernandez stepped up, leading Toyota to win two titles. When Jaworski returned in the 1983 season, tension began brewing between him and Fernandez, which was fueled by the media. Toyota didn't win a title that season, as Crispa won another grand slam.

==== Ginebra San Miguel (1984–1998) ====
When Toyota disbanded at the end of the 1983 season, the team was sold to Basic Holdings, Inc., the company that owns Asia Brewery. Jaworski balked at the idea of joining Beer Hausen, the brand name of Basic Holdings after describing what he felt was a sale done without giving due respect to the personalities involved. Jaworski described the sale as a 'farce,' and that players like him should not be sold "por kilo." At that time, Beer Hausen was intent on making Fernandez as the franchise player of the team with Jaworski relegated in the background. Eventually, then PBA president Carlos "Honeyboy" Palanca III, owner of La Tondeña, Inc. which owns Gilbey's Gin (later Ginebra San Miguel) in the PBA, decided to take in Jaworski and Arnaiz to the team. This marked a turning point in the franchise's history and helped make Ginebra arguably the most popular team in Philippine basketball history with Jaworski at the forefront. This was also the start of the feud between him and Fernandez, which would fuel the Manila Clasico rivalry.

Jaworski and Arnaiz turned the moribund franchise into a competitive one almost overnight when in the First All-Filipino conference of the 1984 season, they led the team to a runner-up finish against powerhouse Crispa. However, he was not able to finish the season due to a knee injury. Gilbey's Gin was then coached by Valenzona, who had also teamed up with him during their MICAA days. Jaworski took over as playing coach of Ginebra San Miguel while Valenzona went to the Tanduay Rhum Makers in the 1985 season.

On October 22, 1985, Jaworski and Ginebra faced the Northern Consolidated Cement team, a team made up of members of the national team and naturalized players Jeff Moore and Dennis Still. In the second quarter, Ginebra was down when Jaworski was accidentally elbowed by Moore. This opened up a big cut on his lip, which made him leave the game. Assistant coach Quirino "Rino" Salazar briefly took over coaching duties. He was brought to Medical City, where he received around 10 stitches. Without Jaworski, NCC's lead went up as much as 15 points. Late in the third quarter, he made his return to the game to the delight of Ginebra fans. He then led a fourth quarter comeback by scoring all of his 17 points in that quarter to lead Ginebra to the 99–96 win. This game led to Ginebra's "Never Say Die" slogan and has been compared to Willis Reed's comeback in the 1970 NBA Finals.

Ginebra made the 1986 All-Filipino finals against Tanduay. Ginebra won the first game, but Tanduay won the next three games. In the final seconds of Game 4 of the best-of-five series, Jaworski reached for a steal on Freddie Hubalde, but was called for a foul. Despite protests that the steal was clean, Hubalde was sent to the line, where he made two free throws to give Tanduay a 93–92 lead. Down by one with six seconds remaining, Jaworski inbounded the ball, got it back, and drove to the basket. It was unsuccessful, as Tanduay won the championship.

Jaworski's first championship as a playing coach came in the 1986 Open Conference when he, alongside import players Michael Hackett and Billy Ray Bates, dominated the entire conference to win the championship finals at the expense of Manila Beer, then led by former Crispa players Abet Guidaben and Co, alongside imports Michael Young and Harold Keeling. In Game 4 of the finals, which went into double overtime, he played the entire game to beat Manila Beer 145–135, thereby taking a 3–1 lead. Jaworski was 40 years old at that time and yet became the PBA record holder for a while for most minutes played by a local in a game, with 58 minutes. This was later broken by Jaworski's wedding godson, Zandro "Jun" Limpot in his rookie season. Ironically, Jaworski owns the PBA record for playing the shortest time in a PBA game, at one second. In a game against the Alaska Milkmen in 1996, he fielded himself in to handle an inbound pass. Ginebra then won Game 5, 130–120, after being down by 18 for its first PBA title. This made him the first playing coach to win a PBA title.

In 1988, Jaworski won his first and only All Filipino championship in a controversial series against the Purefoods Hotdogs, led by Fernandez who had also coached the team in the previous (Open) conference before relinquishing the job to Cris Calilan early in the All Filipino conference. This series became the climax of the rift between Jaworski and Fernandez. In Game 1, Añejo Rum defeated Purefoods; afterwards, the Purefoods owner Jaime Zobel de Ayala and president Renato Buhain publicly accused Fernandez of not playing up to par in Game 1 and ordered him benched for the rest of the series. Añejo Rum won the series 3–1, including an overtime win in Game 4 in which Jaworski led his team with 28 points, including the basket that sent the game into overtime, and four clutch free throws.

In 1989, Jaworski and Fernandez reconciled. Baby Dalupan, coach of their archrival Crispa team, made it possible. Dalupan coached them on the Veterans team during the 1989 All Star Game against the Rookies and Sophomore team. In the final 4 seconds of that game, Jaworski inbounded the ball and passed to Fernandez, who streaked past Benjie Paras and made the game-winning layup for a final score of 132–130. Dalupan then encouraged the two to shake hands after the game. On August 23, 1989, at 43 years old, Jaworski became the seventh player to reach the 10,000 points scored milestone.

Jaworski led the team to the 1990 First Conference finals against Formula Shell. However, in Game 6, with Formula Shell about to win the title, he staged a walkout. As a result, the league fined them a then-record P500,000 fine. During the 1990 All-Filipino Conference, he scored a season-high 28 points against Pop Cola.

In 1991, Jaworski won his third title at the expense of Formula Shell in Game 7 of the First Conference. In that deciding game, he inbounded from the endline to Rudy Distrito with 4 seconds remaining. Distrito made a difficult, twisting, off-balanced and falling shot over the outstretched arms of Paras to pull off a two-point win. He ended up with 13 points, seven rebounds and eight feeds in an all-around effort that stood out given his age of 45 years old. This marked the first time in the history of the PBA that a team came back from a 3–1 deficit to win the championship.

From 1992 to 1995, Ginebra suffered a title drought during budgetary constraints. Jaworski worked with veterans and rookie players alike in trying to earn respectability during this period. In 1995, a PBA record was established when Jaworski took in his eldest son Robert Jaworski, Jr. in the second round of the rookie draft, making this the only time when a father and son were on the same team. However, the two never played together; Jaworski was content coaching the team while Robert Jr. played as a starter.

It was in 1996 when the breakthrough came in for Ginebra through significant roster moves. They selected 6'9" Marlou Aquino as the top draft pick of that year's draft and also brough in free agent point guard Bal David after the duo led the national team to the gold medal in the 1995 SEA Games. They joined a roster that also had Noli Locsin, Vince Hizon, and Pido Jarencio. Despite these, the Alaska Milkmen won a grand slam, including the 1996 Governors' Cup over Ginebra. In 1997 though, Jaworski finally earned his fourth title as a playing coach, mentoring the team to the 1997 Commissioner's Cup championship at the expense of Alaska. The title-clinching game six was a 126–94 rout.

Jaworski's last game in the PBA was on May 25, 1997, during the 1997 All-Filipino Cup finals. In Game 6 he didn't score and they lost the championship to the Purefoods Corned Beef Cowboys. He was able to coach them to one more title during the 1997 Commissioner's Cup. He didn't play during the 1998 season to prepare for his political campaign. With averages of 12.3 points, 5.6 rebounds, 6.1 assists and 1.0 steals in 958 games, he retired owning the record for being the oldest player ever to play in the PBA at 50 years old. He also owned the world record for oldest player to play in a professional game until it was broken by Saudi Arabian Abdulmohsen Khalaf Al-Muwallad in 2015.

Jaworski remained as coach of the team until April 1998 when he announced his intention of running for the Philippine Senate in May that year. Jaworski wound up eighth overall in the Senate race, making him one of the few cagers to become a senator – following the footsteps of Ambrosio Padilla and Freddie Webb. After assuming office, Jaworski turned over the coaching chores to his long-time assistant Rino Salazar while taking a leave of absence from the basketball scene. But in 1998, a disagreement arose when Ginebra owner Eduardo "Danding" Cojuangco, Jr. announced the promotion of Allan Caidic as playing assistant coach. Jaworski resigned from his position as head coach after feeling insulted of not being informed about it beforehand. This allowed him to focus more on his legislative responsibilities. Salazar took over until later on he turned the position over to Caidic when he had to migrate to Alaska and join his family.

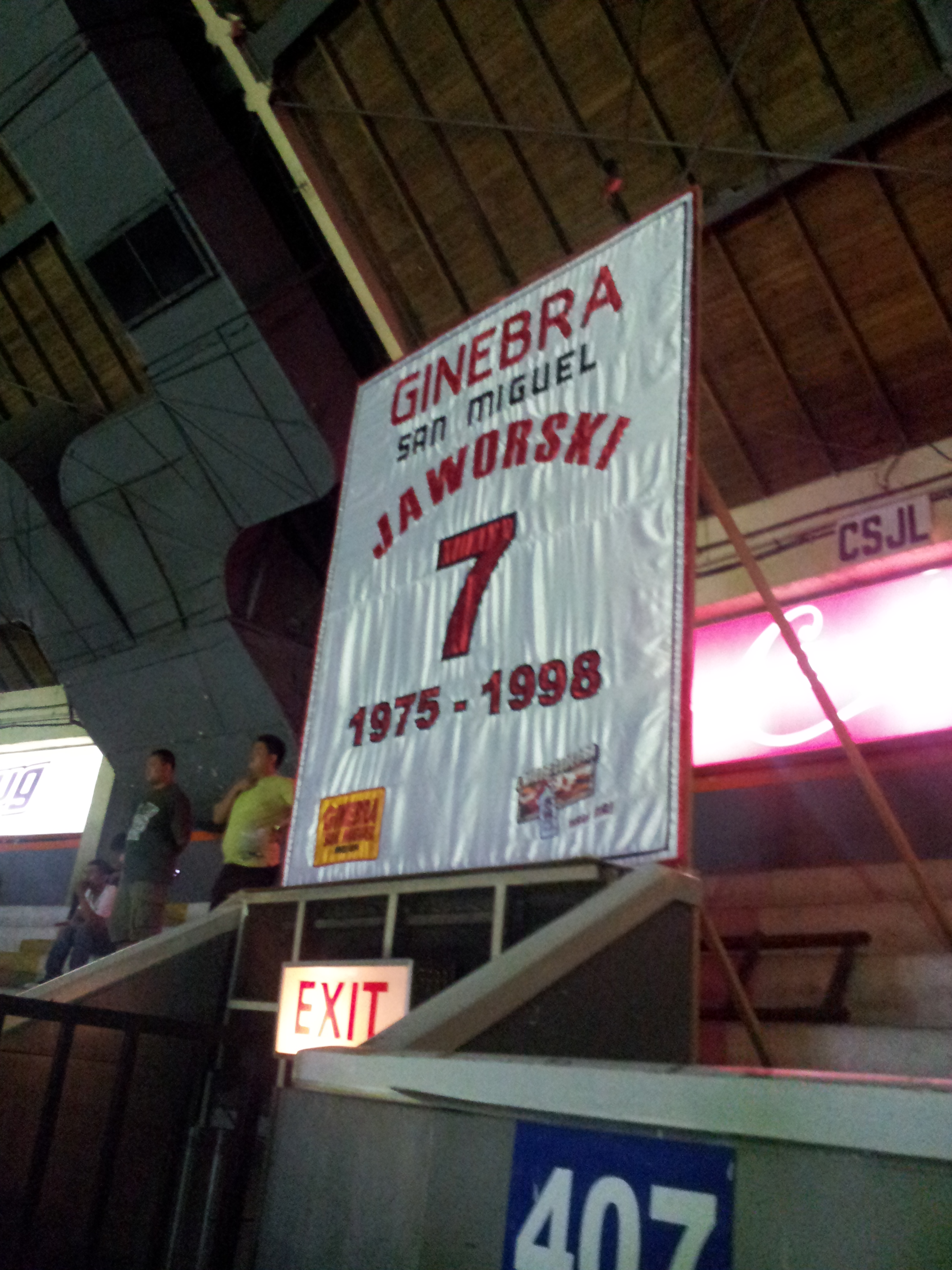
Robert Jaworski's retired jersey banner at the rafters of the Smart Araneta Coliseum during the retirement ceremonies.

=== National team ===
In 1966, Jaworski was part of the amateur selection sent to represent the country in the 1966 Bangkok Asian Games. The following year, he represented the country in the Asian Basketball Championship (now FIBA Asia Cup) in Seoul, South Korea where the Jaworski-led Philippine team won the gold medal at the expense of the host country. He also competed in the 1968 Olympics, in which the Philippines finished 13th out of 16 countries.

Due to their suspension from the BAP, Jaworski and Reynoso were excluded from the RP team to the 1972 Olympics. The two later on teamed up in the Philippine national team for the 1973 ABC Championship. Jaworski was the lead guard and team captain of that team alongside Reynoso, Fernandez, Francis Arnaiz, and William "Bogs" Adornado. Other players in that team included Rogelio "Tembong" Melencio, David "Dave" Regullano, Rosalio "Yoyong" Martirez, Manuel "Manny" Paner, Alberto "Abet" Guidaben, Jaime "Jimmy" Mariano and Ricardo "Joy" Cleofas. They regained the ABC crown (their second FIBA Asia title) and went to the 1974 FIBA World Championship.

Jaworski, after being appointed national team coach by the BAP, later selected Fernandez in the team to represent the Philippines in the 1990 Asian Games in Beijing, China. Fernandez was among 12 PBA players personally chosen by Jaworski to lead the charge for the team – others included Paras, Alvin Patrimonio, Allan Caidic, Samboy Lim, Yves Dignadice, Hector Calma, Ronnie Magsanoc, Zaldy Realubit and the Big J's players with Añejo Rum – Dante Gonzalgo, Chito Loyzaga and Rey Cuenco. This team salvaged the silver medal against host China in the final, losing 90–76.

=== Player profile ===
Jaworski had impressive physical attributes. He had huge hands, which led to one of his earlier nicknames "Big Hands". He also had high leaping ability, similar to Julius Erving's. These attributes helped him in his drives to the rim against taller players, which led to his nickname "The Barreling Big J". His feet were also big for his size, around size 14 to 16. Because of his size, he at first played the center position, and posted up his defenders even as a guard. He could play all five positions.

According to Atoy Co, Jaworski was "an average player". He didn't have a signature move, but could rebound, pass, and bring the ball up. It was his intangibles and discipline that made him special. Steve Watson, a teammate of Jaworski's, called him "the ultimate point guard" and compared him to Magic Johnson. Comparisons have also been made between him and Oscar Robertson, leading to his nickname "The Big J". As a passer, he had a "baseball pass" that he used to take advantage of unprepared transition defenses.

Jaworski was also known as a physical defender and hustle player whose tactics could be seen as "dirty". He was known for sliding his feet under jump shooters. He also hit or punched players such as Billy Ray Bates and Jojo Lastimosa in the abdomen. A trademark move of his was his "karate chop", which he used to steal the ball. When he was asked about his physicality, he was quoted as saying: "Kung ayaw mong masaktan, mag-chess ka na lang!" (If you don't want to get hurt, just play chess!"

It was only later in his career that Jaworski learned to shoot. He is known as the first PBA player to make a three-point shot, albeit in a pre-season game. Import Charlie Floyd is the PBA player to officially make a three-point shot, which he did during the 1980 season. In 1980, he became the first player to make more than eight three pointers in a game.

=== Post-playing career ===
Shortly after retiring, Jaworski joined Tanduay as its product endorser and spokesperson. Due to his duties as senator, he spent little time with Tanduay before he renewed his ties with Barangay Ginebra.

On May 30, 2003, 23 years after the end of the Crispa-Toyota rivalry, Jaworski made an appearance at a reunion game in the Araneta Coliseum, alongside fellow players from both teams. Toyota beat Crispa in that reunion game, 65–62, off his game-winning three pointer. He made another public appearance, this time as the coach of Ginebra, at a reunion game for charity between former players from Ginebra and Purefoods.

The Philippine Daily Inquirer and the Manila Times reported on February 13, 2007, of Jaworski's possible return in the PBA as coach for either the Air21 Express or the Talk 'N Text Phone Pals for the 2007 PBA Fiesta Conference but declined to accept the offer since talks stalled before any contract offer was made. After the tournament, talks resurfaced again between Jaworski and the Air21 management. However, with the resignation of Noli Eala as league commissioner, Jaworski was one of the names mentioned as replacements for the said post although no formal offer had been made. In the end though, Jaworski did not accept either offer and chose to retire from the public eye with his family. He was once again considered for the role of league commissioner in 2015.

In 2014, UE considered him for the title of UAAP commissioner for Season 77. They also considered him for the role of head coach of the Red Warriors.

=== Career highlights ===
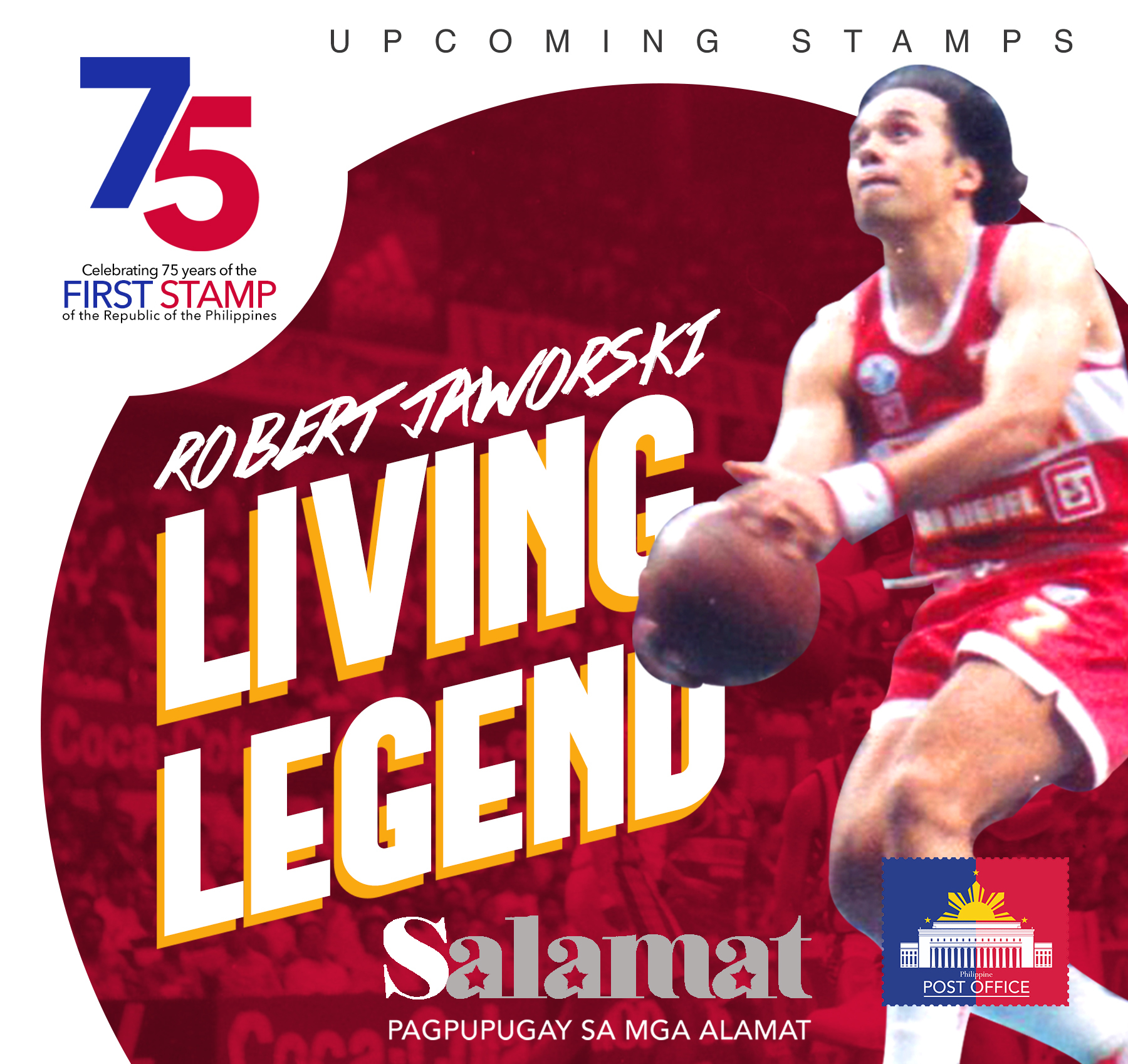
Jaworski on a 2021 postal cover of the Philippines

- PBA Hall of Fame Class of 2005
- PBA Most Valuable Player (1978)
- PBA Mythical First Team Selection (1977, 1978, 1979, 1980, 1981 and 1986)
- PBA Mythical Second Team Selection (1985 and 1988)
- PBA All Defensive Team (1985 and 1988)
- Four time PBA All-Star
- Won four championships as a playing coach in 1986 Open Conference, 1988 All-Filipino Conference, 1991 First Conference and 1997 Commissioner's Cup all with the Ginebra franchise
- Coached the 1990 PBA All-Star Veterans, 1991 PBA All-Star Dark Team, 1992 PBA All-Star North Team, 1996 PBA All-Star Rookie/Sophomore/Juniors, and 1997 PBA All-Star Veterans
- Finished his PBA career with 5,825 career assists
- Member, 1966 Asian Games
- Member, 1967 Asian Basketball Confederation (Champions)
- Member, 1968 Olympic Games
- Member, 1969 Asian Basketball Confederation (Third Place)
- Member, team captain 1971 Asian Basketball Confederation (Second Place)
- Member, 1973 Asian Basketball Confederation (Champions),
- Member, 1974 World Championship
- Member, team captain, 1974 Asian Games
- Head Coach, 1990 Asian Games (Silver Medal)

Jaworski was the team captain of the 1971 team (2nd placer in the 1971 ABC in Tokyo) and 1974 RP team form the Asian Games (4th place)

=== Sports legacy ===
Jaworski played 23 seasons in the PBA, a record he holds along with Asi Taulava. He is also the PBA's all-time leader in assists with 5,825 assists. Aside from assists, as of 2021, he is also in the top 10 in four other categories: third in games played (958), fifth in minutes played (28,915), seventh in rebounds (5,367) and ninth in scoring (11,760). He was the first point guard to achieve 1,000 offensive and 2,000 defensive rebounds, and the seventh player to reach the 10,000 points milestone. He and Fernandez are the only players with 10,000 points, 5,000 rebounds, and 5,000 assists. In 2005, he was inducted into the PBA Hall of Fame. In 2021, he was inducted into the Philippine Sports Hall of Fame. That same year, PHLPost honored him with a set of commemorative stamps. He and Fernandez were then honored with the Lifetime Achievement Award at 2022 PSA Annual Awards. In 2024, Jaworski was awarded with the PBA Lifetime Achievement Award. Ginebra also retired his jersey on July 8, 2012.

Taking a cue from the NBA logo which was inspired from a photo of a dribbling Jerry West, the PBA updated its logo in 1993 to feature a silhouette of Jaworski in a dribbling pose. This cemented his reputation as one of the league's most popular players to this day and an influential figure in Philippine basketball.

Jaworski's longevity, charisma and popularity also carried the PBA to one of its most successful eras. Fans of opposing teams came to cheer for him as he played foil to other PBA stars. When Ginebra had a game, television ratings spiked that day. He rewarded his fans by making time for them, even visiting his fans in hospitals. His popularity led to him getting multiple endorsement deals, making him the first to endorse Timex in the country. He also had an endorsement deal from Converse, and his own signature shoe, the Kaypee Jawo. Other bands he endorsed included Juvelon E+, Toyota Macho, Pepsodent, Dr. J Rubbing Alcohol and Ginebra San Miguel.

Jaworski is also one of the reasons why Ginebra remains one of the most popular teams in the league. In his time with the team, Ginebra became known as a team that pulls of comeback wins through its blue-collar attitude. In 2013, Ginebra released a commemorative bottle.

Sports publications have consistently included Jaworski in their rankings of the greatest PBA players and Ginebra players. In 2012, InterAKTV ranked him as the top Ginebra player in history. They also ranked him as the top point guard in PBA history. In 2020, Spin.ph put him at the top of their "25 Greatest PBA Players" list.

== Political career ==
Jaworski was elected as a senator in the 1998 Philippine general election as a candidate for Pwersa ng Masang Pilipino. He placed ninth in the senate election, one of the highest finishes for a former sportsman after former bowler Tito Sotto's first-place finish in the 1992 elections, and Manny Pacquiao's seventh-place finish in 2016. As a senator, Jaworski focused on environmental and sports legislation. He was chairman of the Economic Affairs, Trade and Commerce Committee and a member of the Games and Amusement and Sports Committee.

Among more than 300 bills he authored or co-authored, Jaworski is most associated with establishing four protected areas – the Mount Kitanglad Range in the province of Bukidnon, the Northern Sierra Madre Mountain Range in Isabela, the Batanes Group of Islands, and Mount Kanlaon – and with regulating the ownership, possession and sale of chainsaws.

Jaworski made proposals to protect the country's national marine sanctuaries and to impose strict penalties on oil pollution damage in Philippine waters. He co-authored the Clean Air Act and the Ecological Solid Waste Management Act.

Jaworski unsuccessfully ran for re-election in the 2004 Philippine Senate election, placing 17th overall.

=== Electoral history ===
Electoral history of Robert Jaworski
Year	Office	Party	Votes received				Result
Year	Office	Party	Total	%	P.	Swing	Result
1998	Senator of the Philippines	PMP	8,968,616	30.62%	8th	—N/a	Won
2004	Senator of the Philippines	Lakas	6,921,425	19.49%	17th	—N/a	Lost

== Acting ==
Jaworski had his acting debut in the Fernando Poe Jr.-led film Fando. Poe had personally invited him to appear in the movie. He then appeared in several movies made by his father-in-law Ramon Revilla Sr. In 1971, Jaworski and Freddie Webb co-starred in the comedy Fastbreak, where they played a pair of snatchers. They also co-starred alongside Nora Aunor in the 1978 comedy Dobol Dribol. He also starred in television shows such as Prrt! Foul! and Manila Files.

=== Films ===
Year	Title	Role
1970	Fando	
1971	Fastbreak	Snatcher
1978	Dobol Dribol	

=== Television ===
Year	Title	Role
1978	Prrt! Foul	
	Manila Files	

== Personal life ==
Since 1968, Jaworski has been married to Evelyn Bautista-Revilla, the daughter of actor Ramon Revilla Sr. His coach Baby Dalupan was one of the godfathers at their wedding, along with Carlo Loyzaga. The couple have four children - Robert Jr., Ryan, Ron Michael, and daughter Ricci Elaine. His assistant coach at Ginebra, Rino Salazar, is his cousin.

Jaworski is known to be charitable. He is known for using his money to send relief goods to victims of calamities. Other times, his Ginebra teammates would raise funds, then he would deliver the donations personally.

Jaworski continued to support Ginebra, occasionally watching their games live when Ginebra made the finals. He would sometimes give locker room speeches when Ginebra was down in the first half of finals games. These proved to be effective in motivating the team, such as when Ginebra forced a Game 7 during the 2013–14 Philippine Cup semis.

After retirement, Jaworski stayed in shape by playing tennis three to five times a week and going swimming. In 2021, Robert Jr. revealed that his father was suffering from a rare blood disorder that raised his iron levels while making him anemic at the same time. He had also had contracted pneumonia a year prior. As of 2024, his condition was improving.

== See also ==
- Manila Clasico

Preceded by Turo Valenzona	Ginebra San Miguel head coach 1985–1998	Succeeded by Rino Salazar
Preceded by Joe Lipa	Philippine National Team Asian Games head coach 1990	Succeeded by Norman Black
