= Narciso Bernardo =

Filipino basketball player and coach

Member of the Mandaluyong City Council
- In office June 30, 1988 – 2002
- Basketball career

Personal information
- Born: July 27, 1937
- Died: December 3, 2008 (aged 71) Manila, Philippines
- Listed height: 5 ft 9 in (175 cm)
- Listed weight: 150 lb (68 kg)

Career information
- College: NU
- Coaching career: 1976–1984

Career history

Coaching
- 1976–1977: U/Tex Wranglers
- 1979–1981: Crispa 400
- 1983–1984: Crispa Redmanizers (assistant)
- 1984: Crispa Redmanizers

Career highlights
- As head coach: PBA champion (1984 First All-Filipino); As assistant coach: 3× PBA champion (1983 All-Filipino, 1983 Reinforced Filipino, 1983 Open); Grand Slam champion (1983)
Medals
Men's Basketball
Representing Philippines
ABC Championship
Gold medal – first place	1960 Manila	Team
Gold medal – first place	1963 Taipei	Team
Silver medal – second place	1965 Kuala Lumpur	Team
Gold medal – first place	1967 Seoul	Team
Asian Games
Gold medal – first place	1962 Jakarta	Team

Narciso C. Bernardo (July 27, 1937 – December 23, 2008), also known as Ciso Bernardo, was a Filipino basketball player, coach and politician. Bernardo was born in Manila, Philippines.

== Career ==
He played for Ysmael Steel, Crispa and Mariwasa in the Manila Industrial and Commercial Athletic Association (MICAA). Bernardo also appeared at the Olympic Games as a member of the country's national basketball team. He coached the Crispa 400s in the MICAA and later the Crispa Redmanizers in the Philippine Basketball Association, where he guided the team to the 1984 PBA First All-Filipino Conference championship, which was to be Crispa's final PBA championship title.

He also served as councilor in Mandaluyong City, as part of its District 2 Councilors in 1988 to 2002, when he suffered a heart attack and did not finished term.
