= Arnie Tuadles =

Filipino basketball player (1956–1996)

Personal information
- Born: August 15, 1956
- Died: November 2, 1996 (aged 40) San Juan, Metro Manila, Philippines
- Listed height: 6 ft 3 in (1.91 m)
- Listed weight: 170 lb (77 kg)

Career information
- College: UV
- Drafted by: Toyota Super Corollas
- Playing career: 1979–1992
- Position: Small forward / power forward
- Number: 11, 22

Career history
- 1979–1983: Toyota Super Corollas
- 1984: Great Taste Coffee Makers
- 1985: Ginebra San Miguel
- 1986: Alaska Milkmen
- 1987–1988: Great Taste Coffee Makers
- 1989–1990: Formula Shell Zoom Masters
- 1990–1992: Presto Ice Cream Kings

Career highlights
- PBA Rookie of the Year (1979); PBA Mythical Five (1979); PBA Mythical Second Team (1984); 50 Greatest Players in PBA History (2025 selection); 1990 Most Outstanding Player (awarded to him by Sports and Columnist Organization of the Philippines (SCOOP))

Arnulfo "Arnie" Tuadles (August 15, 1956 – November 2, 1996) was a Filipino professional basketball player in the Philippine Basketball Association (PBA).

== Career ==
Tuadles began his career as a stalwart in the MICAA, playing for the Manilabank Golden Bankers in the mid-1970s before peddling his wares with the San Miguel Braves. He was one of the many talented Visayan players who donned the SMB uniform in the MICAA as the company was one of the movers and believers of tapping basketball talents from the grassroots.

In 1979, he was picked by Toyota, and in his rookie season, he was awarded as the Rookie of the Year and was included in the Mythical Five selection. He was the first rookie to make it to the Mythical Five. Known for his hang-time and twisting shots inside the paint as well as accurate perimeter jumpers and an assortment of post moves, Tuadles played for the Super Corollas until its disbandment in 1983.

After his days with Toyota were over, he moved on to several teams, namely:

- before the 1984 season, he was acquired by Great Taste. However, he was released by the team to make room for Abe King.
- in 1985, he was acquired by Ginebra San Miguel.
- in 1986, he suited up for Alaska in its maiden season.
- in 1987, he was re-acquired by Great Taste/Presto Ice Cream, where he played for two seasons.
- in 1989, he was recruited by Formula Shell and reunited with his former Toyota mentor, Dante Silverio.
- in 1990, he moved to Presto during the All-Filipino, at the start of the semifinal round, following his contract dispute with his former team Formula Shell. He remained with the CFC franchise until its disbandment in 1992.

In 1990, he became the first player to win two championships with two different teams in one season, having earlier won a title for Shell when he moved to Presto in the middle of the Second Conference.

He retired from playing in the PBA in 1992. Posthumously, Tuadles was named part of the 50 Greatest Players in PBA History in April 2025.

== Personal life ==
Tuadles hails from Argao, Cebu. He was married to former actress Maria Suzette Odyssa, with whom he has three children.

== Later life and death ==
After Presto's sale to Sta. Lucia Realty, with no team to hook up with, Tuadles decided to retire from the game. Since his retirement, he tried his luck into politics and several business ventures to no avail. Then, he got involved in gambling.

On November 2, 1996, Tuadles was shot in the head by his friend, former Games and Amusement Board chairman Ambet Antonio over a heated card game at the International Business Club in Greenhils, San Juan, killing him instantly. Antonio was charged and convicted with murder, and sentenced to suffer the penalty of reclusion perpetua (life imprisonment) on April 30, 1997. However, due to an appeal made by Antonio's legal counsel, his crime was reduced from murder to homicide and his sentence was further reduced from life imprisonment to reclusion temporal (14 years imprisonment) in 2000. Antonio was given conditional pardon by then President Gloria Macapagal Arroyo in 2004.
