= Philip Cezar =

Filipino basketball player, coach, and politician

The Honorable Philip Cezar
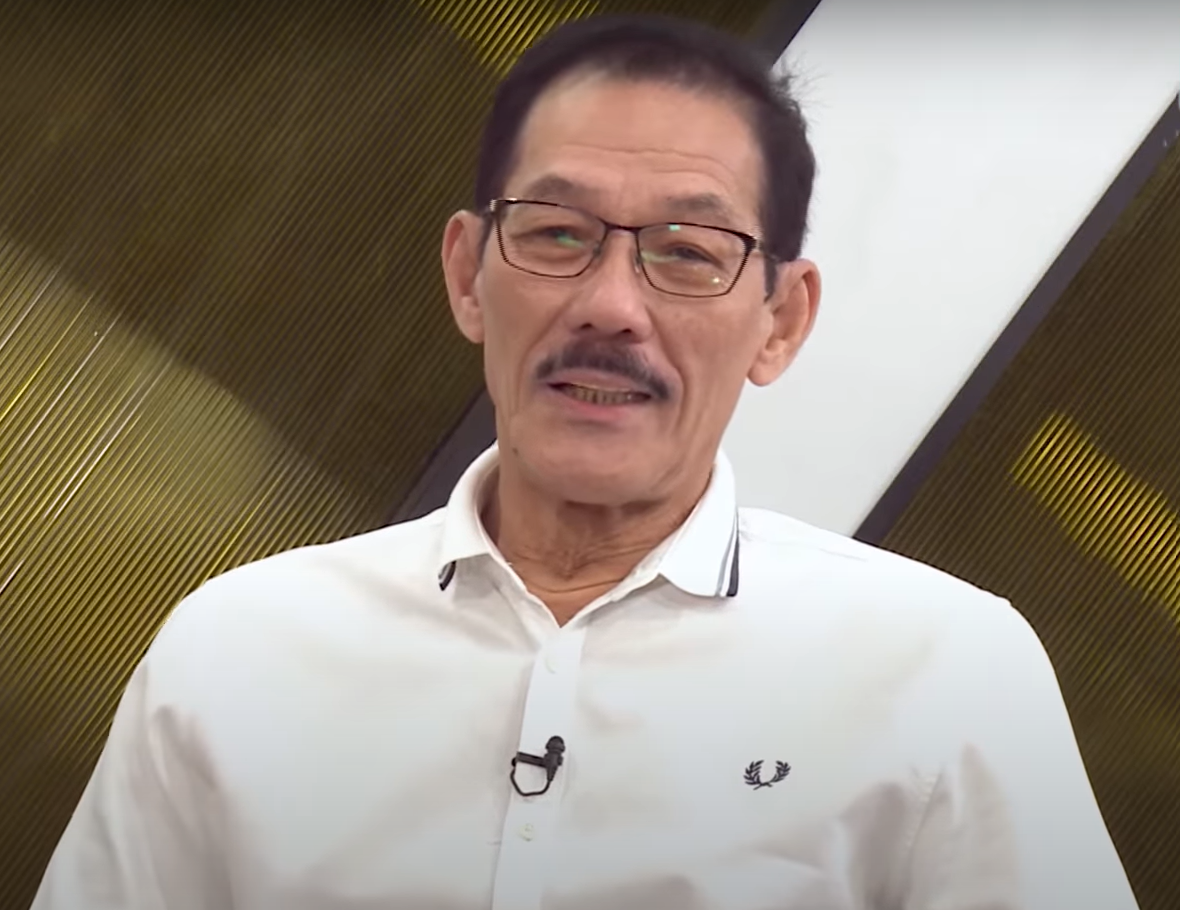
- Cezar in 2022

Director, Manila Sports Council
- In office June 30, 2013 – June 30, 2019
- Mayor: Joseph Estrada
- Preceded by: Paul Almario (OIC)
- Succeeded by: Rodel De Guzman (OIC)

Vice Mayor of San Juan, Metro Manila
- In office June 30, 1992 – June 30, 2001
- Mayor: Jinggoy Estrada
- Preceded by: Jinggoy Estrada
- Succeeded by: Boy Celles

Personal details
- Born: December 1, 1952 (age 73) Santa Cruz, Manila, Philippines
- Party: Pwersa ng Masang Pilipino
- Basketball career

San Juan Knights
- Title: Assistant coach
- League: MPBL

Personal information
- Listed height: 6 ft 3 in (1.91 m)
- Listed weight: 180 lb (82 kg)

Career information
- College: JRC
- PBA draft: 1975 Elevated
- Drafted by: Crispa Redmanizers
- Playing career: 1975–1991
- Position: Power forward / center
- Number: 18

Career history

Playing
- 1974–1984: Crispa Redmanizers
- 1985–1986: Shell Helix Oilers
- 1987–1988: Great Taste/Presto
- 1989–1991: Añejo Rhum/Ginebra San Miguel

Coaching
- 1992–1998: Barangay Ginebra San Miguel (assistant)
- 1999–2001: San Juan Knights
- 2018–2019: Manila Stars
- 2025–present: San Juan Knights (assistant)

Career highlights
- As player: 15× PBA champion (1975 All-Philippine, 1976 First, 1976 Second, 1976 All-Philippine, 1977 All-Filipino, 1977 Open, 1979 All-Filipino, 1980 All-Filipino, 1981 Reinforced Filipino, 1983 All-Filipino, 1983 Reinforced Filipino, 1983 Open, 1984 First All-Filipino, 1987 All-Filipino, 1991 First); 2× PBA All-Star (1989, 1990); MICAA champion (1974); PBA Most Valuable Player (1980); 7× PBA Mythical First Team (1976, 1978–1981, 1983, 1987); 2× PBA Mythical Second Team (1984, 1985); 4× PBA All-Defensive Team (1985–1988); PBA Hall of Fame; 50 Greatest Players in PBA History (2000 selection); As head coach: 2× MBA champion (2000, 2001 first phase); As assistant coach: PBA champion (1997 Commissioners')

Philip Dudley Cezar (born December 1, 1952) is a Filipino former basketball coach, player and politician. Known by the monikers "Mr. Stretch", "Tapal King" and "The Scholar", he was part of the fabled Crispa Redmanizers ballclub of the Philippine Basketball Association that won two Grand Slams in 1976 and 1983. He was named the Most Valuable Player in 1980. He was also a many-time Philippine national team player in the 1970s.

Cezar was vice mayor of San Juan, Metro Manila from 1992 to 2001. He served as acting mayor of San Juan for two months after mayor Jinggoy Estrada was arrested on April 25, 2001, on charges of plunder.

== PBA career ==
During his time in the PBA, Cezar won 15 league championships.

In 2000, he was named as one of the PBA's 25 greatest players of all-time in elaborate awards ceremonies that highlighted the 25th anniversary of the league.

In 2005, he was one of the twelve initial inductees to the PBA Hall of Fame alongside fellow Crispa players Atoy Co and Bogs Adornado, and Toyota stalwarts Robert Jaworski, Francis Arnaiz and Fernandez together with former PBA Commissioners Leo Prieto, Emerson Coseteng and Atty. Rudy Salud as well as legendary Crispa coach and team manager, respectively, Virgilio "Baby" Dalupan and Danny Floro, and the late anchorman Joe Cantada.

He finished his PBA career as the No. 6 all-time leading scorer with 12,077 points, behind Ramon Fernandez, Abet Guidaben, Patrimonio, Atoy Co and Asaytono. He also is the fifth all-time best rebounder with 5,834 total rebounds behind Fernandez, Guidaben, Jerry Codiñera and Alvin Patrimonio. Cezar was No. 2 in shotblocks with 1,370. He also had 3,130 assists (3.4 assists per game), 599 steals, converted 2066/2767 free throws (74.67%) in 28127:05 minutes played in 918 games. He, along with Fernandez, are the only two players in PBA history who has accumulated at least 12,000 points, 5,000 rebounds and 1,000 shot blocks.

=== Career highlights ===
- Member of the 1976 and 1983 Crispa Grand Slam Team
- 1-time Most Valuable Player (1980)
- 7-time Mythical First Team Selection (1976, 1978, 1979, 1980, 1981, 1983, 1987)
- 2-time Mythical Second Team Selection (1984, 1985)
- 2-time PBA All-Star
- 4-time All Defensive Team Member (1985, 1986, 1987, 1988)
- Member, PBA's 25 Greatest Players
- Member, PBA Hall of Fame
- Member, 5,000 & 10,000 points clubs
- Member, 1,000 offensive rebounds club
- Member, 2,000 defensive rebounds club
- Member, 2,000 assists club
- Member, 900 & 1,000 shotblocks clubs
- Member, 500 steals club

== Coaching career ==
After his retirement, Cezar went to coaching. He served as a long-time assistant coach to his former longtime rival Jaworski during the champion teams of Ginebra in the late 1980s and early 1990s.

In 2000, he coached the San Juan Knights to a championship in the now defunct Metropolitan Basketball Association beating the Negros Slashers in six games, 4-2.

In 2004, he was named commissioner of the Universities and Colleges Athletic Association for its third season. In 2005, he accepted the job as the new head coach of the Philippine School of Business Administration.

In 2013, he was appointed by then Manila mayor Joseph Estrada as head of Manila Sports Council. He was the coach of the Manila Stars in the Maharlika Pilipinas Basketball League (MPBL). He held both positions until May 2019.

== Political career ==
Cezar served as vice mayor of San Juan, Metro Manila under mayor Jinggoy Estrada from 1992 to 2001. Cezar joined mayor Estrada and his father, ousted president Joseph Estrada, in the hours before their arrest in their residence in North Greenhills. After their arrest, Cezar was thus appointed as acting mayor of San Juan while mayor Estrada and his father were detained due to charges of plunder. Cezar retired from politics in 2001.

On October 8, 2021, Cezar filed his certificate of candidacy (COC) to run for vice mayor of San Juan in 2022 under Pwersa ng Masang Pilipino. He was the running mate of San Juan Knights team manager Felix Usman, who was running for mayor. However, he and Usman lost to incumbent vice mayor Warren Villa and to incumbent mayor Francis Zamora, respectively. In October 2024, Cezar filed his COC to run for mayor of San Juan in 2025.

Preceded by Atoy Co	NCAA Seniors' Basketball Most Valuable Player; 1972	Succeeded by Freddie Hubalde
