= Bernie Fabiosa =

Filipino basketball player and actor

Bernard Fabiosa
Personal information
- Born: July 23, 1954 (age 72) Tagbilaran, Bohol, Philippines
- Listed height: 5 ft 9 in (1.75 m)
- Listed weight: 160 lb (73 kg)

Career information
- College: USJ–R
- PBA draft: 1975 Elevated
- Drafted by: Crispa Redmanizers
- Playing career: 1975–1991
- Position: Point guard
- Number: 15

Career history
- 1974–1984: Crispa Redmanizers
- 1985–1986: Shell Azodrin/Shell Helix/Formula Shell
- 1987–1989: Great Taste/Presto Tivolis
- 1990: Purefoods Hotdogs
- 1991: Diet Sarsi/Swift Mighty Meaties

Career highlights
- Mythical Ten (1984); 50 Greatest Players in PBA History (2000 selection); 5,000 Points; 2,000 Assists; 1,000 Steals; Top 25: Assists Average; Top 25: Free Throw Percentage; Season Champion: Total Assists; 7x Season Champion: Total Steals

Bernie Fabiosa (born July 23, 1954) is a retired Filipino professional basketball player and actor. He spent most of his playing days with the Crispa Redmanizers in the PBA. During his heyday, he is tops in career steals, earning for himself the monicker The Sultan of Swipe.

== Playing career ==
Fabiosa played 17 seasons in the PBA from 1975 to 1991. In 1981, he led the league in assists, tallying 8.4 points, 3.6 assists and 1.6 steals across his name. He also led the league in steals for seven seasons.

Bernie remained as one of Crispa's starters and kept his place as the Redmanizers' top assist man. When Crispa disbanded at the end of the 1984 PBA season, he was acquired by newcomer Shell Azodrin. He played two seasons for Shell before being traded and reunited with Crispa's old pals and former coach Baby Dalupan at Great Taste.

A dislocated shoulder caused by a nasty fall midway through the 1988 PBA season drastically affected his marketability. He had no takers when the 1989 season opened and Bernie played briefly for Crispa 400 in the PABL before being recalled by his former team Presto Tivoli. Fabiosa's comeback was unsuccessful as he suited up for only five games during the season.

In 1990, the Purefoods Hotdogs signed him up as coach Baby Dalupan believes he could still get some mileage from the veteran and one of the six remaining pioneers of the league. The following year, he suited up for Diet Sarsi and played 22 games in the All-Filipino Conference before retiring for good.

He finished his career with 6,597 points, 2,853 assists and 1,235 steals in 788 games. He converted 1,414/1,876 FTs for a career average of 75.4%. He is ranked No. 3 in all-time steals behind only Johnny Abarrientos and Ramon Fernandez.

In 2000, he was inducted to the all-time PBA 25th anniversary team.

== Retirement and later career ==
After his playing days were over, Fabiosa dabbled into acting together with former Crispa teammate Atoy Co, where he took minor supporting roles in action movies.

=== Filmography ===
Source: Bernard Fabiosa - IMDb

Year	Title	Role
1990	May Isang Tsuper ng Taxi	As Himself
1992	Lucio Margallo	Alex's men
1993	Masahol Pa sa Hayop	Private Osco
1994	Walang Matigas na Tinapay sa Mainit na Kape	As Himself
1994	Ka Hector	captured soldier
1994	Kanto Boy 2: Anak ni Totoy Guapo	-
1995	Dog Tag: Katarungan sa Aking Kamay	Sgt. Carragua
1996	Isa, Dalawa, Takbo	Totoy's men
1997	Matrikula	Coach (as himself)
1997	Bobby Barbers: Parak	Ike
1998	Berdugo	Syndicate man
1998	Ang Erpat kong Astig	Bernie (as himself)
2000	Sagot Kita: Mula Ulo Hanggang Paa	Van Driver

== Personal life ==
Fabiosa was previously married to former beauty queen Marilyn Manansala, with whom he has two children, Magnolia and Byron. He was also in a relationship with singer Malu Barry, with whom he has a child named Bernice.

Among his friends, he considered Philip Cesar and Atoy Co as his bestfriends. They called themselves PBA back in the old times, which stands for Philip, Bernard and Atoy.

He migrated to the United States in 2005 and now lives in Northridge in the northern California valley with his wife, Dr. Almi Valenzuela, a dentist.
