= Atoy Co =

Filipino basketball player and coach

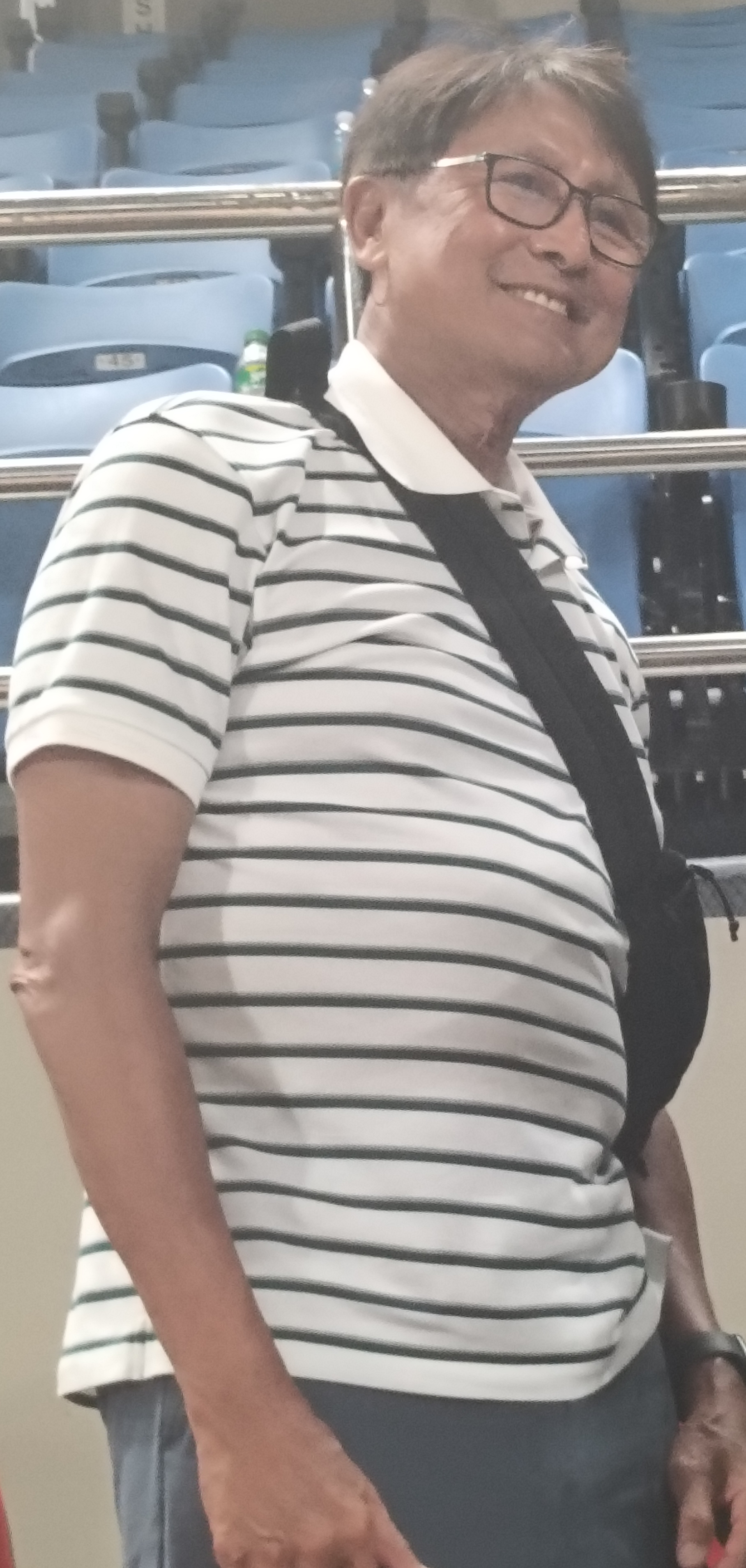
- Co in 2025

Member of the Pasig City Council from the 1st district
- In office June 30, 1998 – June 30, 2007

Personal details
- Born: October 15, 1951 (age 75) Pasig, Rizal, Philippines
- Party: Nacionalista
- Basketball career

Personal information
- Listed height: 6 ft 2 in (1.88 m)
- Listed weight: 168 lb (76 kg)

Career information
- College: Mapúa
- Drafted by: Crispa Redmanizers
- Playing career: 1972–1988
- Position: Shooting guard / point guard
- Coaching career: 1989–1991, 2012–2018

Career history

Playing
- 1972–1984: Crispa Redmanizers
- 1985–1986: Manila Beer Brewmasters
- 1987–1988: Great Taste/Presto Ice Cream

Coaching
- 1989–1991: Crispa 400
- 2012–2018: Mapúa

Career highlights
- As player: 15× PBA champion; PBA Most Valuable Player (1979); PBA Hall of Fame Class of 2005; 50 Greatest Players in PBA History (2000 selection); 9× PBA Mythical First Team (1975–1977, 1979–1984); PBA scoring champion (1979); As head coach: 2× PBL champion (1990 PBL Challenge Cup, 1991 PBL Maharlika Cup); As commissioner: 1st commissioner of the UNTV Cup (2013–present)

Fortunato "Atoy" Gan Co Jr. (born October 15, 1951) is a Filipino former basketball player and coach who played 13 seasons in the Philippine Basketball Association, mostly with Crispa Redmanizers. Nicknamed "The Fortune Cookie" (a pun on his name and ethnicity) during his playing days, he was notable for his trademark turnaround fadeaway jump shot. He is also a former politician and actor.

== Collegiate and amateur career ==
Co joined the Mapúa Cardinals in 1970 and played for the Mapúa team for three years. He was named the Most Valuable Player (MVP) during his first two years. He also brought his wares with the old Crispa team in the MICAA.

== Professional career ==
Co first played in the PBA on April 22, 1975, scoring 34 points and leading Crispa to a 113-102 win over CFC, the team's first victory after starting the season with three straight defeats.

During his PBA stint, he played for the two-time grand slam champion Crispa Redmanizers from 1975 to 1984, with him as one of the team's top scorers. In 1976, he received the All-Filipino Sports Award for Basketball.

== Post-PBA career ==
=== Acting career ===
Co ventured into television and films after his playing days were over, first as a co-host for the noontime show Student Canteen over at RPN (now RPTV), and started alongside action stars like Phillip Salvador in films such as Delima Gang in 1989. He made a career mostly out of playing supporting roles in films and television series.

=== Politics and other interests ===
Co became a politician when he served as a long-time city councilor of Pasig from 1998 to 2007. In 2010, he ran again as councilor and was successful in his reelection bid.

He also operated a sports bar named Atoy's at Metrowalk, Pasig.

=== Coaching career ===
In 1989, Co became the coach of the Crispa 400 in the PABL, leading the team to two titles in 1990 and 1991.

He served as the head coach of his alma mater, the Mapúa Cardinals, from 2012 to 2018.

=== Sports management career ===
In 2013, Co became the first commissioner of the UNTV Cup, which is the first charity basketball league dedicated for public servants in the Philippines, an original concept by "Mr. Public Service" Daniel Razon.

== Coaching record ==
=== Collegiate record ===
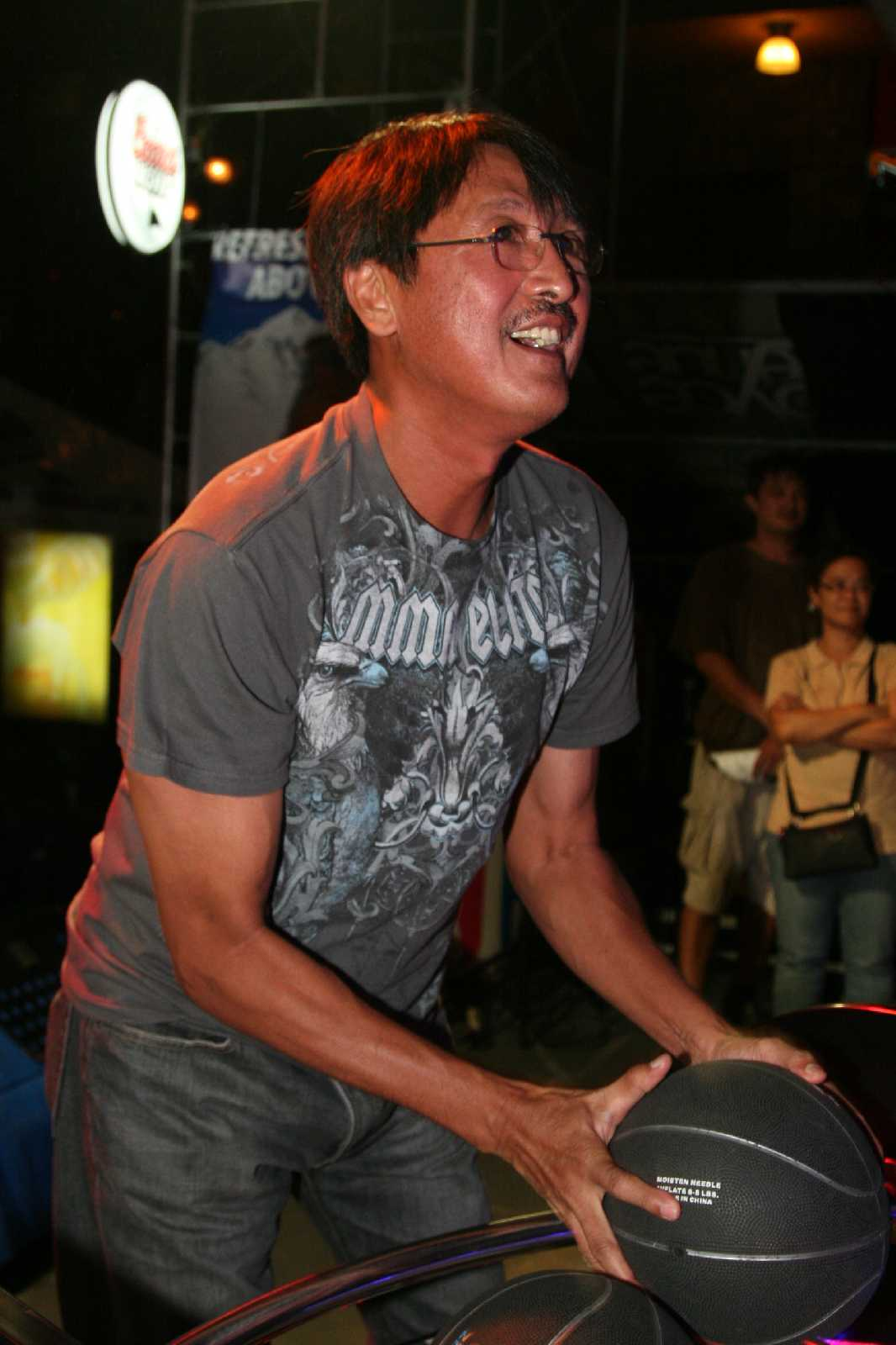
Co in 2010

Season	Team	Elimination round					Playoffs				
Season	Team	GP	W	L	PCT	Finish	GP	W	L	PCT	Results
2013	MIT	18	2	16	.111	10th	–	–	–	–	Eliminated
2014	MIT	18	4	14	.111	10th	–	–	–	–	Eliminated
2015	MIT	18	12	6	.667	3rd	3	2	1	.667	Semifinals
2016	MIT	18	12	6	.667	3rd	1	0	1	.000	Semifinals
2017	MU	18	3	15	.167	10th	–	–	–	–	Eliminated
2018	MU	18	6	12	.333	7th	–	–	–	–	Eliminated
Totals		108	39	69	.361		4	2	2	.500	0 championships

== Filmography ==
Year	Title	Role	Note(s)	Ref(s).
1988	Bobo Cop			
1989	Delima Gang	Junior		
1991	Uubusin Ko ang Lahi Mo	Jun		
1992	Boy Recto	Damian Mendiola		
2004	Pakners	Police Officer		
2010	My Amnesia Girl	Tatay Diego		

Preceded by	NCAA Seniors' Basketball Most Valuable Player; 1971	Succeeded by Philip Cezar
Preceded by Chito Victolero	Mapua Cardinals men's basketball head coach 2013-2018	Succeeded by Randy Alcantara
