= List of Philippine Basketball Association champions =

Logo of the PBA finals used since the 2010–11 PBA season

The Philippine Basketball Association awards a championship trophy (or cup) to the winning team at the end of each conference (tournament).

To determine a champion for a conference, a double-round elimination (sometimes a classification) round is usually held. After the elimination (or classification) round, the playoffs would be held.

There had been a variety of ways the league conducted its playoffs, such as:

- Single-elimination tournament
- The twice-to-beat advantage (The higher-seeded team needs to win only once in order to advance, while the lower-seeded team needs to win twice consecutively. This is basically a modification of the best-of-three series.)
- Round-robin (or double-round robin)
- Best-of-three series
- Best-of-five series
- Best-of-seven series

There are two types of conferences: All-Filipino or import-laden. The All-Filipino conferences are tournaments where the teams are prohibited from hiring a foreigner as an additional player. An import-laden conference is a tournament where teams are allowed to hire a foreigner (the "import") as an additional player.

Starting from the PBA's first conference, most finals series are in a best-of-five format. The 1982 PBA Reinforced Filipino Conference is the first finals series that is best-of-seven. Starting the season after that, championship series in import-laden conferences are in a best-of-seven format, while all-Filipino conferences are best-of-five. Starting in 1989, almost finals series are in a best-of-seven format, excluding special conferences like the 1998 PBA Centennial Cup, or if the PBA is forced to shorten the season, like during the 2013–14 season, where the last two conferences were made into best-of-five series to make way for the Philippine national team's participation in the 2014 FIBA Basketball World Cup and 2014 Asian Games.

The winning team is said to be the champions of the conference. After each season, there would be no playoffs in order to determine a "season champion."

However, the teams which are both boldfaced and italicized, the Crispa Redmanizers (1976 and 1983), the San Miguel Beermen (1989), the Alaska Milkmen (1996) and the San Mig Super Coffee Mixers (2013–14), hold the distinction of winning all three conferences in one season and have the distinction of winning the "Grand Slam". Winning the Grand Slam is the equivalent of the "season championship," where the team is said to be the undisputed champion in the league.

The league previously holds a "battle for third place" playoff to determine the third-place team in a conference. This practice was abandoned beginning the 2010–11 season.

== Champions by season ==
Won the Grand Slam
Won the first two championships in a season
Special conference; does not count at the trophy tally below.

=== 1975–2010 ===
Season	Conference	Champion	Series	Runner-up	Third place	Winning coach
1975	First Conference	Toyota	3–1	Crispa	U/Tex	Dante Silverio
1975	Second Conference	Toyota	2–1	Crispa	Noritake	Dante Silverio
1975	All-Philippine	Crispa	3–2	Toyota	U/Tex	Baby Dalupan
1976	First Conference	Crispa	3–1	Toyota	Noritake	Baby Dalupan
1976	Second Conference	Crispa	3–1	Toyota	Royal	Baby Dalupan
1976	All-Philippine	Crispa	3–2	Toyota	U/Tex	Baby Dalupan
1977	All-Filipino	Crispa	3–1	Mariwasa	Toyota	Baby Dalupan
1977	Open	Crispa	3–2	U/Tex	Toyota	Baby Dalupan
1977	Invitational	Toyota	3–0	Emtex Brazil	Crispa	Dante Silverio
1978	All-Filipino	Toyota	3–1	Filmanbank	Tanduay	Dante Silverio
1978	Open	U/Tex	3–0	Crispa	Toyota	Tommy Manotoc
1978	Invitational	Toyota	3–1	Tanduay	Crispa	Dante Silverio
1979	All-Filipino	Crispa	3–2	Toyota	Tanduay	Baby Dalupan
1979	Open	Royal	3–1	Toyota	Great Taste	Ed Ocampo
1979	Invitational	Toyota	3–1	Walk Tall	U/Tex	Fort Acuña
1980	Open	U/Tex	3–2	Toyota	Walk Tall	Tommy Manotoc
1980	Invitational	Nicholas Stoodley (USA)	2–0	Toyota	Adidas (France)	Jerry Webber
1980	All-Filipino	Crispa	3–1	Toyota	Tanduay	Baby Dalupan
1981	Open	Toyota	3–2	Crispa	U/Tex	Ed Ocampo
1981	Reinforced Filipino	Crispa	3–1	U/Tex	Presto	Baby Dalupan
1982	Reinforced Filipino	Toyota	4–3	San Miguel	Crispa	Ed Ocampo
1982	Invitational	San Miguel	2–1	Crispa	South Korea	Tommy Manotoc
1982	Open	Toyota	3–0	Gilbey's Gin	San Miguel	Ed Ocampo
1983	All-Filipino	Crispa	3–0	Gilbey's Gin	Great Taste	Tommy Manotoc
1983	Reinforced Filipino	Crispa	3–2	Great Taste	Tanduay	Tommy Manotoc
1983	Open	Crispa	3–0	Great Taste	San Miguel	Tommy Manotoc
1984	First All-Filipino	Crispa	4–1	Gilbey's Gin	Northern Cement	Narciso Bernardo
1984	Second All-Filipino	Great Taste	3–0	Beer Hausen	Tanduay	Baby Dalupan
1984	Invitational	Great Taste	3–2	Crispa	Beer Hausen	Baby Dalupan
1985	Open	Great Taste	4–2	Magnolia	Northern Cement	Baby Dalupan
1985	All-Filipino	Great Taste	3–1	Shell	Tanduay	Baby Dalupan
1985	Reinforced	Northern Cement	4–0	Manila Beer	Ginebra	Ron Jacobs
1986	Reinforced	Tanduay	4–2	Great Taste	Ginebra	Turo Valenzona
1986	All-Filipino	Tanduay	3–1	Ginebra	Shell	Turo Valenzona
1986	Open	Ginebra	4–1	Manila Beer	Great Taste	Robert Jaworski
1987	Open	Tanduay	4–1	Great Taste	Magnolia	Turo Valenzona
1987	All-Filipino	Great Taste	3–0	Hills Bros.	Magnolia	Baby Dalupan
1987	Reinforced	San Miguel	4–1	Hills Bros.	Ginebra	Norman Black
1988	Open	San Miguel	4–3	Purefoods	Alaska	Norman Black
1988	All-Filipino	Añejo	3–1	Purefoods	Alaska	Robert Jaworski
1988	Reinforced	San Miguel	4–1	Shell	Añejo	Norman Black
1989	Open	San Miguel	4–1	Shell	Alaska	Norman Black
1989	All-Filipino	San Miguel	4–2	Purefoods	Shell	Norman Black
1989	Reinforced	San Miguel	4–1	Añejo	Alaska	Norman Black
1990	First Conference	Shell	4–2	Añejo	San Miguel	Arlene Rodriguez
1990	All-Filipino	Presto	4–3	Purefoods	Añejo	Jimmy Mariano
1990	Third Conference	Purefoods	3–2	Alaska	Shell	Baby Dalupan
1991	First Conference	Ginebra	4–3	Shell	Diet Sarsi	Robert Jaworski
1991	All-Filipino	Purefoods	3–2	Diet Sarsi	Alaska	Ely Capacio
1991	Third Conference	Alaska	3–1	Ginebra	San Miguel	Tim Cone
1992	First Conference	Shell	4–1	San Miguel	Alaska	Rino Salazar
1992	All-Filipino	San Miguel	4–3	Purefoods	Swift	Norman Black
1992	Third Conference	Swift	4–0	7-Up	Ginebra	Yeng Guiao
1993	All-Filipino	Coney Island	4–2	San Miguel	Swift	Chot Reyes
1993	Commissioner's	Swift	4–2	Purefoods	San Miguel	Yeng Guiao
1993	Governors'	San Miguel	4–1	Swift	Sta. Lucia	Norman Black
1994	All-Filipino	San Miguel	4–2	Coney Island	Alaska	Norman Black
1994	Commissioner's	Purefoods	4–1	Alaska	Swift	Chot Reyes
1994	Governors'	Alaska	4–2	Swift	Pepsi	Tim Cone
1995	All-Filipino	Sunkist	4–3	Alaska	Sta. Lucia	Derrick Pumaren
1995	Commissioner's	Sunkist	4–2	Alaska	Sta. Lucia	Derrick Pumaren
1995	Governors'	Alaska	4–3	San Miguel	Sunkist	Tim Cone
1996	All-Filipino	Alaska	4–1	Purefoods	San Miguel	Tim Cone
1996	Commissioner's	Alaska	4–3	Shell	Sta. Lucia	Tim Cone
1996	Governors'	Alaska	4–1	Ginebra	Shell	Tim Cone
1997	All-Filipino	Purefoods	4–2	Gordon's Gin	Sta. Lucia	Eric Altamirano
1997	Commissioner's	Gordon's Gin	4–2	Alaska	San Miguel	Robert Jaworski
1997	Governors'	Alaska	4–1	Purefoods	San Miguel	Tim Cone
1998	All-Filipino	Alaska	4–3	San Miguel	Pop Cola	Tim Cone
1998	Commissioner's	Alaska	4–2	San Miguel	Pop Cola	Tim Cone
1998	Centennial	Mobiline	1–0	Shell	Pop Cola	Eric Altamirano
1998	Governors'	Shell	4–3	Mobiline	Purefoods	Perry Ronquillo
1999	All-Filipino	Shell	4–2	Tanduay	Barangay Ginebra	Perry Ronquillo
1999	Commissioner's	San Miguel	4–2	Shell	Alaska	Jong Uichico
1999	Governors'	San Miguel	4–2	Alaska	Tanduay	Jong Uichico
2000	All-Filipino	Alaska	4–1	Purefoods	Tanduay	Tim Cone
2000	Commissioner's	San Miguel	4–1	Sta. Lucia	Alaska	Jong Uichico
2000	Governors'	San Miguel	4–1	Purefoods	Red Bull	Jong Uichico
2001	All-Filipino	San Miguel	4–2	Barangay Ginebra	Pop Cola	Jong Uichico
2001	Commissioner's	Red Bull	4–2	San Miguel	Alaska	Yeng Guiao
2001	Governors'	Sta. Lucia	4–2	San Miguel	Shell	Norman Black
2002	Governors'	Purefoods	4–3	Alaska	Coca-Cola	Ryan Gregorio
2002	Commissioner's	Red Bull	4–3	Talk 'N Text	San Miguel	Yeng Guiao
2002	All-Filipino	Coca-Cola	3–1	Alaska	San Miguel	Chot Reyes
2003	All-Filipino	Talk 'N Text	4–2	Coca-Cola	Alaska	Joel Banal
2003	Invitational	Alaska	2–1	Coca-Cola	FedEx	Tim Cone
2003	Reinforced	Coca-Cola	4–3	San Miguel	Talk 'N Text	Chot Reyes
(2004)	Fiesta	Barangay Ginebra	3–1	Red Bull	Talk 'N Text	Siot Tanquingcen
2004–05	Philippine	Barangay Ginebra	4–2	Talk 'N Text	San Miguel	Siot Tanquingcen
2004–05	Fiesta	San Miguel	4–1	Talk 'N Text	Shell	Jong Uichico
2005–06	Fiesta	Red Bull	4–2	Purefoods	Air21	Yeng Guiao
2005–06	Philippine	Purefoods	4–2	Red Bull	Alaska	Ryan Gregorio
2006–07	Philippine	Barangay Ginebra	4–2	San Miguel	Talk 'N Text	Jong Uichico
2006–07	Fiesta	Alaska	4–3	Talk 'N Text	Red Bull	Tim Cone
2007–08	Philippine	Sta. Lucia	4–3	Purefoods	Red Bull	Boyet Fernandez
2007–08	Fiesta	Barangay Ginebra	4–3	Air21	Red Bull	Jong Uichico
2008–09	Philippine	Talk 'N Text	4–3	Alaska	Sta. Lucia	Chot Reyes
2008–09	Fiesta	San Miguel	4–3	Barangay Ginebra	Burger King	Siot Tanquingcen
2009–10	Philippine	Purefoods	4–0	Alaska	San Miguel	Ryan Gregorio
2009–10	Fiesta	Alaska	4–2	San Miguel	Talk 'N Text	Tim Cone

=== 2010–present ===
Starting from the 2010 season, the third-place playoff (popularly known as the "battle for third") was no longer held.

Season	Conference	Champion	Series	Runner-up	Winning coach
2010–11	Philippine	Talk 'N Text	4–2	San Miguel	Chot Reyes
2010–11	Commissioner's	Talk 'N Text	4–2	Barangay Ginebra	Chot Reyes
2010–11	Governors'	Petron	4–3	Talk 'N Text	Ato Agustin
2011–12	Philippine	Talk 'N Text	4–1	Powerade	Chot Reyes
2011–12	Commissioner's	B-Meg	4–3	Talk 'N Text	Tim Cone
2011–12	Governors'	Rain or Shine	4–3	B-Meg	Yeng Guiao
2012–13	Philippine	Talk 'N Text	4–0	Rain or Shine	Norman Black
2012–13	Commissioner's	Alaska	3–0	Barangay Ginebra	Luigi Trillo
2012–13	Governors'	San Mig Coffee	4–3	Petron	Tim Cone
2013–14	Philippine	San Mig Coffee	4–2	Rain or Shine	Tim Cone
2013–14	Commissioner's	San Mig Coffee	3–1	Talk 'N Text	Tim Cone
2013–14	Governors'	San Mig Coffee	3–2	Rain or Shine	Tim Cone
2014–15	Philippine	San Miguel	4–3	Alaska	Leo Austria
2014–15	Commissioner's	Talk 'N Text	4–3	Rain or Shine	Jong Uichico
2014–15	Governors'	San Miguel	4–0	Alaska	Leo Austria
2015–16	Philippine	San Miguel	4–3	Alaska	Leo Austria
2015–16	Commissioner's	Rain or Shine	4–2	Alaska	Yeng Guiao
2015–16	Governors'	Barangay Ginebra	4–2	Meralco	Tim Cone
2016–17	Philippine	San Miguel	4–1	Barangay Ginebra	Leo Austria
2016–17	Commissioner's	San Miguel	4–2	TNT	Leo Austria
2016–17	Governors'	Barangay Ginebra	4–3	Meralco	Tim Cone
2017–18	Philippine	San Miguel	4–1	Magnolia	Leo Austria
2017–18	Commissioner's	Barangay Ginebra	4–2	San Miguel	Tim Cone
2017–18	Governors'	Magnolia	4–2	Alaska	Chito Victolero
2019	Philippine	San Miguel	4–3	Magnolia	Leo Austria
2019	Commissioner's	San Miguel	4–2	TNT	Leo Austria
2019	Governors'	Barangay Ginebra	4–1	Meralco	Tim Cone
2020	Philippine	Barangay Ginebra	4–1	TNT	Tim Cone
2021	Philippine	TNT	4–1	Magnolia	Chot Reyes
2021	Governors'	Barangay Ginebra	4–2	Meralco	Tim Cone
2022–23	Philippine	San Miguel	4–3	TNT	Leo Austria
2022–23	Commissioner's	Barangay Ginebra	4–3	Bay Area (Hong Kong)	Tim Cone
2022–23	Governors'	TNT	4–2	Barangay Ginebra	Jojo Lastimosa
2023–24	Commissioner's	San Miguel	4–2	Magnolia	Jorge Gallent
2023–24	Philippine	Meralco	4–2	San Miguel	Luigi Trillo
2024–25	Governors'	TNT	4–2	Barangay Ginebra	Chot Reyes
2024–25	Commissioner's	TNT	4–3	Barangay Ginebra	Chot Reyes
2024–25	Philippine	San Miguel	4–2	TNT	Leo Austria
2025–26	Philippine	San Miguel	4–2	TNT	Leo Austria
2025–26	Commissioner's	Barangay Ginebra	4–3	TNT	Tim Cone

== Championships by franchise ==
Championships won from conferences shaded in gray above, such as Mobiline's 1998 Centennial Cup and Añejo's 1988 PBA-IBA Championship titles are not included in the table below.

Franchise	Championships	Runners-up	Third places	Total trophies	Last championship
**San Miguel / Royal / Gold Eagle / Magnolia / Petron**	31	16	15	62	2025–26 Philippine
**Barangay Ginebra / Gilbey's Gin / St. George / Ginebra / Añejo / Tondeña / Gordon's Gin**	16	17	7	40	2026 Commissioner's
Alaska / Hills Bros.	14	17	12	43	2013 Commissioner's
**Magnolia / Purefoods / Coney Island / B-Meg Derby Ace / B-Meg / San Mig Coffee / San Mig Super Coffee / Star**	14	18	1	33	2018 Governors'
Crispa / Walk Tall	13	7	4	24	1984 First All-Filipino
**TNT / Pepsi / 7-Up / Mobiline / Talk 'N Text**	11	16	5	32	2024–25 Commissioner's
Toyota	9	9	3	21	1982 Open
Great Taste / Presto / N-Rich	6	4	4	14	1990 All-Filipino
Shell	4	5	6	15	1999 All-Filipino
Pop Cola / Sarsi / Diet Sarsi / Swift / Sunkist	4	3	7	14	1995 Commissioner's
Tanduay	3	2	8	13	1987 Open
Red Bull / Barako Bull	3	2	4	9	2005–06 Fiesta
**Rain or Shine / Welcoat**	2	4	0	6	2016 Commissioner's
Powerade / Coca-Cola	2	3	1	6	2003 Reinforced
U/Tex	2	2	5	9	1980 Open
Sta. Lucia	2	1	6	9	2007–08 Philippine
**Meralco**	1	4	0	5	2024 Philippine
Northern Cement*	1	0	2	3	1985 Reinforced
Nicholas Stoodley (United States)*	1	0	0	1	1980 Invitational
Manila Beer / Beer Hausen	0	3	1	4	—
Barako Bull / FedEx / Air21 / Burger King	0	1	2	3	—
Noritake / Mariwasa	0	1	2	3	—
Bay Area (Hong Kong)*	0	1	0	1	—
Filmanbank	0	1	0	1	—
Adidas (France)*	0	0	1	1	—
Emtex (Brazil)*	0	0	1	1	—
South Korea*	0	0	1	1	—

Bold denotes active franchise

* Guest team

== Championships by player ==
The teams provided were the teams that the player were part of the championship roster. Bold denotes player in the PBA.

Player	Total	Team/Franchise
Ramon Fernandez	19	Toyota, Tanduay, San Miguel
Freddie Hubalde	16	Crispa, Tanduay
Abet Guidaben	16	Crispa, San Miguel
Philip Cezar	15	Crispa, Great Taste, Ginebra
Bernie Fabiosa	15	Crispa, Great Taste, Purefoods
Atoy Co	14	Crispa, Great Taste
Robert Jaworski	13	Toyota, Ginebra/Añejo/Gordon's Gin
Johnny Abarrientos	12	Alaska, Coca-Cola, Barangay Ginebra
Yancy de Ocampo	12	Talk 'N Text, B-Meg/San Mig Coffee/San Mig Super Coffee, San Miguel
Joe Devance	12	Alaska, B-Meg/San Mig Coffee/San Mig Super Coffee, Barangay Ginebra
**Chris Ross**	12	San Miguel
**Marcio Lassiter**	12	San Miguel
**June Mar Fajardo**	12	San Miguel
Cris Bolado	11	Alaska, Purefoods, Gordon's Gin, San Miguel, Coca-Cola
**Rafi Reavis**	11	Coca-Cola, Barangay Ginebra, Magnolia
Luis "Tito" Varela	10	Crispa
Bogs Adornado	10	Crispa, U/Tex, Great Taste
Jojo Lastimosa	10	Purefoods, Alaska
Bong Hawkins	10	Alaska, Coca-Cola
**Jayson Castro**	10	Talk 'N Text/TNT
**Kelly Williams**	10	Sta. Lucia, Talk 'N Text/TNT

== Championships by coach ==
Listed below are the coaches who won at least two PBA championships. Championships won from conferences shaded in gray above, such as Eric Altamirano's 1998 Centennial Cup and Rino Salazar's 1988 PBA-IBA Championship titles are not included in the table below. Both coaches otherwise would have won two titles each if those were included, instead of just one.

^	Denotes coach who is still active
*	Elected to the PBA Hall of Fame
*^	Active coach who has been elected to the PBA Hall of Fame

Coach	Total	Champion teams handled	Last championship
Tim Cone^	26	Alaska, B-Meg/San Mig Coffee/San Mig Super Coffee, Barangay Ginebra	2026 Commissioner's (Barangay Ginebra)
Baby Dalupan*	15	Crispa, Great Taste, Purefoods	1990 Third Conference (Purefoods)
Norman Black*^	11	San Miguel, Sta. Lucia, Talk 'N Text	2012–13 Philippine (Talk 'N Text)
Chot Reyes^	11	Coney Island/Purefoods, Coca-Cola, Talk 'N Text/TNT	2024–25 Commissioner's (TNT)
Leo Austria^	11	San Miguel	2025–26 Philippine (San Miguel)
Jong Uichico^	9	San Miguel, Barangay Ginebra, Talk 'N Text	2015 Commissioner's (Talk 'N Text)
Yeng Guiao^	7	Swift, Red Bull, Rain or Shine	2016 Commissioner's (Rain or Shine)
Tommy Manotoc*	6	U/Tex, San Miguel, Crispa	1983 Open (Crispa)
Dante Silverio*	5	Toyota	1978 Invitational (Toyota)
Ed Ocampo*	4	Royal Tru Orange, Toyota	1982 Open (Toyota)
Robert Jaworski*	4	Ginebra/Añejo/Gordon's Gin	1997 Commissioner's (Gordon's Gin)
Turo Valenzona	3	Tanduay	1987 Open (Tanduay)
Siot Tanquingcen	3	Barangay Ginebra, San Miguel	2009 Fiesta (San Miguel)
Ryan Gregorio	3	Purefoods	2009–10 Philippine (Purefoods)
Derrick Pumaren	2	Sunkist	1995 Commissioner's (Sunkist)
Perry Ronquillo	2	Shell	1999 All-Filipino (Shell)
Luigi Trillo^	2	Alaska, Meralco	2024 Philippine (Meralco)

== See also ==
- PBA Finals Most Valuable Player Award
