= 1975 Toyota Comets season =

- Head coach: Dante Silverio
- Owner(s): Delta Motor Corporation

First Conference results
- Record: 22–4 (84.6%)
- Place: 1st
- Playoff finish: Finals

Second Conference results
- Record: 16–7 (69.6%)
- Place: 1st
- Playoff finish: Finals

All-Philippine Championship results
- Record: 4–4 (50%)
- Place: 2nd
- Playoff finish: Finals

Toyota Comets seasons

The 1975 Toyota Comets season was the first season of the franchise in the Philippine Basketball Association (PBA).

== Colors ==
(dark)
(light)

== First Conference standings ==
#	Teams	W	L	PCT	GB
1	Toyota Comets	13	3	.812	–-
2	Crispa Redmanizers	12	4	.750	1
3	U-Tex Weavers	10	6	.625	3
4	Royal Tru-Orange	10	6	.625	3
5	Mariwasa-Noritake	8	8	.500	5
6	Concepcion Carrier	7	9	.438	6
7	Tanduay Distillers	5	11	.312	8
8	Presto Ice Cream Flavorites	5	11	.312	8
9	Seven-Up	2	14	.125	11

The Comets were unbeaten in the semifinals, winning all their six matches.

== Notable dates ==
April 9: The very first double-header of the PBA season had 18,000 fans trooped to the Araneta Coliseum, Toyota Comets beat U/Tex Weavers, 105-101, in the second game, Ompong Segura topscored for the Comets with 23 points and Francis Arnaiz added 22 points.

May 4: Toyota whips Concepcion Carrier, 116-100, for their seventh straight win, the Comets are riding high on a 24-game winning run, counting its stint in the amateur league.

July 15: Toyota finally beats Crispa, 106-104, in their third meeting.

July 17: Toyota beats U/tex, 127-112, to become the first team to reach the PBA finals.

== Championships ==
The Toyota Comets won the first two conferences of the PBA's inaugural season by defeating their rivals Crispa Redmanizers.

In the All-Philippine championship, Toyota and Crispa played for the third straight time in the finals and the Comets were denied of a Grandslam season by the Redmanizers, which took the deciding fifth game for a 3-2 series victory.

== Roster ==
Roster	#	Position	Height
Alberto Reynoso	4	Center	6 ft 2 in (1.88 m)
Roberto Concepcion	5	Forward	6 ft 1 in (1.85 m)
Robert Jaworski	7	Guard	6 ft 1 in (1.85 m)
Francis Arnaiz	8	Guard	5 ft 11 in (1.80 m)
Orlando Bauzon	9	Guard	6 ft 1 in (1.85 m)
Ramon Fernandez	10	Center	6 ft 4.5 in (1.94 m)
Oscar Rocha	11	Forward	5 ft 11 in (1.80 m)
Cristino Reynoso	14	Forward	6 ft 1 in (1.85 m)
Rodolfo Segura	15	Forward	6 ft 2 in (1.88 m)
Fort Acuña	17	Forward	6 ft 1 in (1.85 m)
Joaquin Rojas	22	Guard	5 ft 7 in (1.70 m)
Aurelio Clariño	23	Center	6 ft 2 in (1.88 m)
Stan "Sweet" Cherry ^{Import}	30	Forward-Center	6 ft 7 in (2.01 m)
Byron "Snake" Jones ^{Import}	33	Center	6 ft 8 in (2.03 m)
