= 1981 PBA Open Conference finals =

Team	Coach	Wins
Toyota Super Diesels	Edgardo Ocampo	3
Crispa Redmanizers	Baby Dalupan	2
- Dates: July 16–25, 1981
- Television: MBS
- Radio network: DWXL

PBA Open Conference finals chronology
- < 1980 1982 >

The 1981 PBA Open Conference finals was the best-of-5 basketball championship series of the 1981 PBA Open Conference, and the conclusion of the conference's playoffs.

The Toyota Super Diesels defeated Crispa Redmanizers in a five-game series to win their seventh PBA title and finally ended frustrations of last season's three runner-up finishes. New Toyota coach Edgardo Ocampo won his first title with his new team and the second overall in his PBA coaching career. Toyota and Crispa played for the 10th and last time in a finals series.

== Qualification ==
Crispa Redmanizers		Toyota Super Diesels
Finished 13–5 (.722)	Eliminations	Finished 12–6 (.667)
Finished 4–2 (.667), 2nd	Semifinals	Finished 5–1 (.833), 1st

== Games summary ==
=== Game 1 ===
MBS

July 16

Toyota Super Diesels 123, Crispa Redmanizers 116
Scoring by quarter: 33–26, 24–20, 31–33, 35–37
Pts: Ramon Fernandez 26	Pts: Freddie Hubalde 30
Toyota leads series, 1–0

Araneta Coliseum, Quezon City

The Super Diesels led by as many as 16 points, 75–59. The fouling out of Jaworski, Fields and Tuadles gave the Redmanizers the chance to narrow the gap and then tie the score twice, the last at 112-all.

Toyota had to lean on the relief job of Victor King and the last-minute heroics and Danny Florencio and Ramon Fernandez to secure the hard-earned victory.

=== Game 2 ===
MBS

July 18

Toyota Super Diesels 124, Crispa Redmanizers 126
Scoring by quarter: 37–42, 16–30, 39–28, 32–26
Pts: Ramon Fernandez 29	Pts: Atoy Co 28
Series tied, 1–1

Araneta Coliseum, Quezon City

Robert Jaworski missed a desperation three-point shot with one second left that could have won the game for the Super Diesels.

The Redmanizers led by 23 points late in the second quarter, 70–47, but fell behind, 100–104, in the fourth period. A see-saw battle had the lead change hands five times and the score tied three times, the last at 119-all.

=== Game 3 ===
MBS

July 21

Toyota Super Diesels 116, Crispa Redmanizers 126
Scoring by quarter: 34–24, 21–31, 32–29, 29–42
Pts: Francis Arnaiz 23	Pts: Abet Guidaben 30
Crispa leads series, 2–1

Araneta Coliseum, Quezon City

Crispa trailed, 106–114, with 4:06 remaining. The Redmanizers went on a scoring spree and held Toyota to a lone field goal by Abe King. The Super Diesels collapsed with four straight misses and three errors.

=== Game 4 ===
MBS

July 23

Toyota Super Diesels 116, Crispa Redmanizers 98
Scoring by quarter: 20–26, 36–26, 29–28, 31–18
Pts: Andrew Fields 26	Pts: Atoy Co 18 Freddie Hubalde 18
Series tied, 2–2

Araneta Coliseum, Quezon City

Andrew Fields triggered Toyota’s blazing 13–1 windup with his four-point cluster that put the Super Diesels on top, 107–97, with 2:52 to go.

=== Game 5 ===
MBS

July 25

Toyota Super Diesels 103, Crispa Redmanizers 97
Scoring by quarter: 28–27, 31–28, 22–24, 22–18
Pts: Ramon Fernandez 20	Pts: Philip Cezar 20
Toyota wins series, 3–2

Araneta Coliseum, Quezon City

The fifth and deciding game in the best-of-five title series had more than 25,000 fans at the big dome, the fitting climax had NBA referees Lee Jones and James Capers officiate the match. The game was close from start to finish and was deadlocked several times, it was tied for the last time at 97-all with 3:15 to go. After Ramon Fernandez scores to give Toyota a 99–97 lead, a Crispa turnover resulted to Atoy Co given a technical foul, Fernandez converted the technical free throw to make it 100–97 for the Super Diesels at the 2:00 mark. Another turnover by the Redmanizers, this time from an offensive foul from Co gives Toyota the ball possession.

With 1:20 left, Andrew Fields scores with a foul from James Hardy. Fields sank his bonus shot for a three-point play, 103–97 for Toyota. On the next play, Bernie Fabiosa slips and lost the ball to Francis Arnaiz. Both teams had a series of misses in the final minute and with 20 seconds to go, Toyota freezes the ball to end the game in jubilation.

1981 PBA Open Conference Champions

Toyota Super Diesels
Seventh title

== Rosters ==
Toyota Super Diesels roster
Players
Coaches

Pos.	No.	Nat.	Name	Ht.	Wt.
C	1	(United States)	Andrew Fields (I)	6 ft 9 in (2.06 m)		Cheyney
F	6	(Philippines)	Abe King	6 ft 3 in (1.91 m)		San Beda
G	7	(Philippines)	Robert Jaworski	6 ft 1 in (1.85 m)		UE
G	8	(Philippines)	Francis Arnaiz	5 ft 11 in (1.80 m)		Ateneo
G	9	(Philippines)	Eduardo Merced	6 ft 0 in (1.83 m)		José Rizal
C	10	(Philippines)	Ramon Fernandez	6 ft 4 in (1.93 m)		San Carlos
F	11	(Philippines)	Arnie Tuadles	6 ft 2 in (1.88 m)		Visayas
G	14	(Philippines)	Quirino Salazar	5 ft 9 in (1.75 m)		Letran
G/F	18	(Philippines)	Emerito Legaspi	5 ft 11 in (1.80 m)		UE
F	20	(Philippines)	Nicanor Bulaong	6 ft 4 in (1.93 m)		Far Eastern
G/F	22	(Philippines)	Danny Florencio	5 ft 10 in (1.78 m)		UST
F/C	34	(United States)	Victor King (I)	6 ft 8 in (2.03 m)		Louisiana Tech
F	41	(Philippines)	Leopoldo Herrera	6 ft 3 in (1.91 m)		Wesleyan Philippines

Head coach

- (Philippines) Ed Ocampo

Assistant coach(es)

Legend

- (C) Team captain
- (I) Import
- Injured

Crispa Redmanizers roster
Players
Coaches

Pos.	No.	Nat.	Name	Ht.	Wt.
C	5	(Philippines)	Abet Guidaben	6 ft 5 in (1.96 m)		USJ–R
G	6	(Philippines)	Fortunato Co, Jr	6 ft 1 in (1.85 m)		Mapúa
C	8	(Philippines)	Jaime Javier	6 ft 5 in (1.96 m)		José Rizal
G	9	(Philippines)	Gregorio Dionisio	5 ft 9 in (1.75 m)		Adamson
G/F	10	(Philippines)	Freddie Hubalde	6 ft 1 in (1.85 m)		Mapúa
F/C	11	(United States)	James Hardy (I)	6 ft 8 in (2.03 m)		San Francisco
G/F	12	(Philippines)	Virgilio Dela Cruz	6 ft 3 in (1.91 m)		Mapúa
G	14	(Philippines)	Tito Varela	6 ft 1 in (1.85 m)		UE
G	15	(Philippines)	Bernie Fabiosa	5 ft 9 in (1.75 m)		UE
C	17	(Philippines)	Romulo Mamaril	6 ft 6 in (1.98 m)		Mapúa
F	18	(Philippines)	Philip Cezar	6 ft 3 in (1.91 m)		José Rizal
F	20	(Philippines)	Bernardo Carpio	6 ft 3 in (1.91 m)		Ateneo
C	33	(United States)	Byron Jones (I)	6 ft 9 in (2.06 m)		San Francisco

Head coach

- (Philippines) Baby Dalupan

Assistant coach(es)

Legend

- (C) Team captain
- (I) Import
- Injured

== Broadcast notes ==
Game	Play-by-play	Analyst
Game 1		
Game 2		
Game 3		
Game 4		
Game 5		
