= 1976 in Philippine television =

The following is a list of events affecting Philippine television in 1976. Events listed include television show debuts, finales, cancellations, and channel launches, closures and rebrandings, as well as information about controversies and carriage disputes.

== Premieres ==
Date	Show
March 21	PBA on GTV on GTV 4
August 2	Magandang Tanghali (2nd incarnation) on RPN 9
November 1	GMA News Digest on GMA 7
November 1	News at Seven on GMA 7

=== Unknown ===
- Gameworld on IBC 13
- Enterrr JJ on IBC 13
- Kahapon Lamang on GMA 7
- Suerte sa Siete on GMA 7
- Interaction on GMA 7
- Sine Siyete on GMA 7
- Kumpletos Recados on RPN 9

== Returning or renamed programs ==
Show	Last aired	Retitled as/Season/Notes	Channel	Return date
Philippine Basketball Association	1975 (BBC; season 1: "All-Philippine Championship")	Same (season 2: "First Conference")	GTV	March 21
Philippine Basketball Association	1976 (season 2: "First Conference")	Same (season 2: "Second Conference")	GTV	July
Magandang Tanghali	1968 (ABS-CBN)	Same (2nd incarnation)	RPN	August 2
Philippine Basketball Association	1976 (season 2: "Second Conference")	Same (season 2: "All-Philippine Championship")	GTV	November 28

== Programs transferring networks ==
Date	Show	No. of seasons	Moved from	Moved to
March 21	Philippine Basketball Association	2	BBC	GTV
August 2	Magandang Tanghali	—N/a	ABS-CBN (now BBC)	RPN

== Finales ==
- October 29: GMA Evening Report on GMA 7
- October 31: GMA News Roundup on GMA 7
- December 21: PBA on GTV on GTV 4

=== Unknown ===
- Ito na Kami on GMA 7
- Jukebox Jamboree on GMA 7
- Katuwaan sa Siyete on GMA 7
- Baltic & Co on GMA 7
- Talagang Ganyan on GMA 7
- Ito na Kami on GMA 7
- Zarda on RPN 9
- Fantastik Jeanne in Motion on RPN 9

== Births ==
- January 22 – TJ Trinidad
- February 2 – Ana Roces
- February 7 – Chito Miranda
- February 11 – Jao Mapa
- February 18 – January Isaac
- February 19 – Victor Neri
- March 25 – Leandro Muñoz
- March 28 – Roselle Nava
- March 31 – Vice Ganda
- April 2 – Geneva Cruz
- April 4 – Bearwin Meily
- April 26 - Joko Diaz
- May 2 – Alicia Mayer
- June 4 – Buwi Meneses
- August 11 – Jhong Hilario
- August 16 – Jomari Yllana
- September 6 – Mylene Dizon
- September 22 – Wowie de Guzman
- October 27 – Joanne Santos
- November 18 – Gio Alvarez
- November 30 – Bobby Andrews
- December 3 – Bernard Palanca
- December 7 – Derek Ramsay
- December 13 – Radha Cuadrado
- December 23 – Ivan Mayrina

== See also ==
- 1976 in television
