= 1976 PBA First Conference finals =

Team	Coach	Wins
Crispa Redmanizers	Baby Dalupan	3
Toyota Comets	Dante Silverio	1
- Dates: July 4–11, 1976
- Television: GTV
- Announcers: DWXL

PBA First Conference finals chronology
- < 1976

The 1976 PBA First Conference finals was the best-of-5 basketball championship series of the 1976 PBA First Conference, and the conclusion of the conference's playoffs. The defending champion Toyota Comets and Crispa Redmanizers played in the finals for the fourth straight time.

The Crispa Redmanizers won their second straight championship, winning their series against the Toyota Comets, three games to one.

== Qualification ==
Crispa Redmanizers		Toyota Comets
Finished 15–1 (.937), 1st	Eliminations	Finished 14–2 (.875), 2nd
Finished 4–2 (.667), 2nd	Semifinals	Finished 5–1 (.833), 1st

== Games summary ==
GTV

July 4

Crispa Redmanizers 115, Toyota Comets 119
Scoring by quarter: 36–30, 29–25, 27–33, 23–31
Pts: Bogs Adornado 31	Pts: Fernandez 28 Arnaiz 27

Araneta Coliseum, Quezon City

GTV

July 6

Crispa Redmanizers 117, Toyota Comets 112
Scoring by quarter: 28–31, 23–28, 36–18, 30–35
Pts: Bogs Adornado 30	Pts: Francis Arnaiz 32

Araneta Coliseum, Quezon City

GTV

July 8

Crispa Redmanizers 121, Toyota Comets 114
Scoring by quarter: 30–33, 38–27, 18–33, 35–21
Pts: Bogs Adornado 36	Pts: Ompong Segura 36

Araneta Coliseum, Quezon City

GTV

July 11

Crispa Redmanizers 101, Toyota Comets 100
Scoring by quarter: 25–18, 30–28, 36–27, 10–27
Pts: Adornado 24 Co 22	Pts: Arnaiz 25 Jaworski 23
Crispa wins series, 3–1

Araneta Coliseum, Quezon City

== Broadcast notes ==
Game	Play-by-play	Analyst
Game 1		
Game 2		
Game 3		
Game 4		
