= 1980 PBA Open Conference finals =

Team	Coach	Wins
U/Tex Wranglers	Tommy Manotoc	3
Toyota Tamaraws	Fort Acuna	2
- Dates: July 24 – August 2, 1980
- Television: MBS
- Radio network: DWXL

PBA Open Conference finals chronology
- < 1979 1981 >

The 1980 PBA Open Conference finals was the best-of-5 basketball championship series of the 1980 PBA Open Conference, and the conclusion of the conference's playoffs.

U/Tex Wranglers wins their 2nd PBA title with a 3–2 series victory over Toyota Tamaraws. The deciding fifth game became known as the "last 16 seconds" when U/Tex wiped out a four-point lead by Toyota in regulation and forced the game into overtime.

== Qualification ==
U-Tex Wranglers		Toyota Tamaraws
Finished 11–7 (.611), 4th	Eliminations	Finished 15–3 (.833), 1st
Finished 4–2 (.667), 1st	Semifinals	Finished 4–2 (.667), tied for 2nd
Finished 4–2 (.667), 1st	Tiebreaker	Won against Walk Tall Jeans, 102–100

== Games summary ==
=== Game 1 ===
MBS

July 24

U/Tex Wranglers 110, Toyota Tamaraws 94
Pts: Lim Eng Beng 27
U/Tex leads series, 1–0

Araneta Coliseum, Quezon City

=== Game 2 ===
MBS

July 26

recap

U/Tex Wranglers 102, Toyota Tamaraws 107
Pts: Robert Jaworski 28
Series tied, 1–1

Araneta Coliseum, Quezon City

Sonny Jaworski scored a finals record eight triples and finished the game with 28 points. The Tamaraws trailed 35–40 when Jaworski flipped his first three-point shot in the second quarter. He followed it with two more triples and his third three-pointer push Toyota ahead by two, 44–42. The Tamaraws went ahead by seven points, 66–59, at the end of the second quarter with Jaworski firing three more three-point shots late in the period.

U/Tex twice tied Toyota early in the fourth and actually went ahead, 94–93. A 7–3 blast sparked by Jaworski's last three-point shot of the evening sent the Tamaraws back on top, 100–97. The Big J fouled out with 1:45 left and Toyota up by only three, 102–99. Francis Arnaiz and Abe King put together a five-point cluster that wrapped up the match for the Tamaraws.

=== Game 3 ===
MBS

July 29

U-Tex Wranglers 103, Toyota Tamaraws 98
U/Tex leads series, 2–1

Araneta Coliseum, Quezon City

=== Game 4 ===
MBS

July 31

U/Tex Wranglers 92, Toyota Tamaraws 113
Series tied, 2–2

Araneta Coliseum, Quezon City

=== Game 5 ===
MBS

August 2

U/Tex Wranglers 99 , Toyota Tamaraws 98 (OT)
Scoring by quarter: 25–15, 27–27, 22–28, 20–24, Overtime: 5–4
U/Tex wins series, 3–2

Araneta Coliseum, Quezon City

Toyota’s 92–87 edge on Jaworski’s triple was wiped out by Lim Eng Beng’s three-point play as he had already released his shot and drew Jaworski’s sixth and final foul.

Francis Arnaiz' go-ahead layup gave Toyota a 94–90 edge with 16 seconds left in regulation. The Tamaraws were on their way of clinching the title when a series of mental lapses allowed the Wranglers to come back. With still three fouls away from the penalty, the Tamaraws allowed import Aaron James to drive unmolested towards the basket with an undergoal stab, a timeout was called by Toyota coach Fort Acuna with time down to 11 seconds. As the Tamaraws inbounded, the Wranglers went on a press and anticipated the play, Arnie Tuadles was doubled team by Lim Eng Beng and Matthew Gaston, relayed to Abe King on the other side of the front court, Glenn McDonald intercepted the ball and pounced on for a breakaway with five seconds to go, he was fouled by Arnaiz going to the hoop with two seconds remaining in regulation, McDonald calmly sank the two free throws to extend the game into overtime.

A see-saw battle ensued in the extension period with both teams obviously feeling the championship pressure, Bogs Adornado converted on a long attempt with 1:25 left in the ballgame, which later proved to be the winning basket as both teams would commit a series of misses until the final buzzer sounded.

1980 PBA Open Conference Champions

U/Tex Wranglers
Second title

== Rosters ==
U/Tex Wranglers roster
Players
Coaches

Pos.	No.	Nat.	Name	Ht.	Wt.
F	5	(Philippines)	Roy Deles	6 ft 0 in (1.83 m)		San Beda
G	6	(Philippines)	Ricardo Pineda	5 ft 9 in (1.75 m)		Letran
G	7	(Philippines)	Manuel Pineda	5 ft 8 in (1.73 m)		Letran
F	8	(Philippines)	Jaime Noblezada	6 ft 2 in (1.88 m)		San Agustin
F/C	9	(Philippines)	Jaime Taguines	6 ft 3 in (1.91 m)		Holy Angel
F	12	(Philippines)	Reynaldo Pages	6 ft 1 in (1.85 m)		De La Salle
G/F	13	(Philippines)	Oscar Rocha	6 ft 1 in (1.85 m)		San Sebastian
G	14	(Philippines)	Lim Eng Beng	5 ft 11 in (1.80 m)		De La Salle
F	15	(Philippines)	Rodolfo Segura	6 ft 2 in (1.88 m)		Adamson
F/C	17	(Philippines)	David Regullano	6 ft 4 in (1.93 m)		Letran
F	20	(United States)	Glenn McDonald (I)	6 ft 6 in (1.98 m)		Long Beach State
G	22	(Philippines)	Matthew Gaston	6 ft 1 in (1.85 m)		Ateneo
F/C	23	(United States)	Aaron James (I)	6 ft 8 in (2.03 m)		Grambling State
G/F	33	(Philippines)	Bogs Adornado	6 ft 1 in (1.85 m)		UST

Head coach

- (Philippines) Tommy Manotoc

Assistant coach(es)

Legend

- (C) Team captain
- (I) Import
- Injured

Toyota Tamaraws roster
Players
Coaches

Pos.	No.	Nat.	Name	Ht.	Wt.
C	1	(United States)	Andrew Fields (I)	6 ft 8 in (2.03 m)		Cheyney
F/C	6	(Philippines)	Abe King	6 ft 3 in (1.91 m)		San Beda
G	7	(Philippines)	Robert Jaworski	6 ft 0 in (1.83 m)		UE
G	8	(Philippines)	Francis Arnaiz	5 ft 10 in (1.78 m)		Ateneo
G	9	(Philippines)	Eduardo Merced	6 ft 0 in (1.83 m)		José Rizal
F/C	10	(Philippines)	Ramon Fernandez	6 ft 4 in (1.93 m)		San Carlos
G/F	11	(Philippines)	Arnie Tuadles	6 ft 2 in (1.88 m)		Visayas
G	12	(Philippines)	Pablo Javier	5 ft 11 in (1.80 m)		Far Eastern
G	14	(Philippines)	Quirino Salazar	5 ft 9 in (1.75 m)		Letran
F	18	(Philippines)	Emerito Legaspi	5 ft 11 in (1.80 m)		UE
F	20	(Philippines)	Nicanor Bulaong	6 ft 3 in (1.91 m)		Far Eastern
F	41	(Philippines)	Leopoldo Herrera	6 ft 3 in (1.91 m)		Wesleyan Philippines
F/C	43	(United States)	Bruce King (I)	6 ft 8 in (2.03 m)		Iowa
G/F	44	(Philippines)	Danny Florencio	5 ft 10 in (1.78 m)		UST

Head coach

- (Philippines) Fort Acuña

Assistant coach(es)

Legend

- (C) Team captain
- (I) Import
- Injured

== Broadcast notes ==
Game	Play-by-play	Analyst
Game 1		
Game 2		
Game 3		
Game 4		
Game 5	Dick Ildefonso	Emy Arcilla and Lauro Mumar
