= 1975 PBA All-Philippine Championship =

1975 PBA All-Philippine Championship finals
Team	Coach	Wins
Crispa Redmanizers	Baby Dalupan	3
Toyota Comets	Dante Silverio	2
- Dates: December 6–14, 1975
- Television: BBC
- Announcers: DWXL

PBA All-Philippine Championship finals chronology
- 1976 >

The 1975 PBA All-Philippine Championship was the third and last conference of the 1975 PBA season. It started on November 30 and ended on December 14, 1975. The Toyota Comets and the Crispa Redmanizers played for the third championship contested by the league.

The Crispa Redmanizers finally won over the Toyota Comets, three games to two, for their first PBA championship. The Redmanizers also captured the Seven-Up All-Filipino Sports award for the team of the year.

== Elimination round ==
Qualified for finals
Qualified for battle for third

#	Team Standings	W	L	PCT	GB
1	Crispa Redmanizers	3	0	1.000	–-
2	Toyota Comets	2	1	.667	1
3	Royal Tru-Orange	1	2	.333	2
4	U-Tex Weavers	0	3	.000	3

== Battle for third ==
BBC

December 6

U-Tex Weavers 113, Royal Tru-Orange 125

Araneta Coliseum, Quezon City

BBC

December 8

U-Tex Weavers 131, Royal Tru-Orange 114

Araneta Coliseum, Quezon City

BBC

December 10

U-Tex Weavers 118, Royal Tru-Orange 122

Araneta Coliseum, Quezon City

BBC

December 12

U-Tex Weavers 113, Royal Tru-Orange 99

Araneta Coliseum, Quezon City

BBC

December 14

U-Tex Weavers W, Royal Tru-Orange L
U-Tex wins series, 3-2

Araneta Coliseum, Quezon City

== Finals ==
BBC

December 6

Crispa Redmanizers 97, Toyota Comets 99
Scoring by quarter: 21-18, 31-28, 26-23, 19–30
Pts: Rudy Soriano 23	Pts: Jones 22 Arnaiz 22

Araneta Coliseum, Quezon City

Byron "Snake" Jones sink four straight charities in the last 55 seconds to give Toyota a 99–95 lead. It was a come-from behind victory by the Comets, which trailed by as much as 10 points thrice in the third quarter, the last at 78–68 and by nine points, 84-75, with eight minutes left in the game.

BBC

December 8

Crispa Redmanizers 111, Toyota Comets 107
Scoring by quarter: 28–31, 29–31, 23-20, 31-25
Pts: Bogs Adornado 27	Pts: Byron Jones 23

Araneta Coliseum, Quezon City

The Redmanizers rose from an eight-point deficit, 86–94, to take the lead for good at 100–98, on a 14–4 cluster by Adornado, Philip Cezar, Bernie Fabiosa and Rudy Soriano.

BBC

December 10

Crispa Redmanizers 101, Toyota Comets 93
Scoring by quarter: 26-14, 24–26, 27-25, 24–28
Pts: Bogs Adornado 24	Pts: Francis Arnaiz 25

Araneta Coliseum, Quezon City

Crispa's intense defense forced the Comets into 10 errors alone in the first quarter and the Redmanizers took a 26–14 advantage in the first 12 minutes of play. A couple of sizzling layups by Rey Franco past Toyota import Byron "Snake" Jones highlighted Crispa's surge to its biggest lead of 16 points in the third quarter, 64-48.

BBC

December 12

Crispa Redmanizers 77, Toyota Comets 79
Scoring by quarter: 20-18, 20–26, 20-19, 17-16
Pts: Bogs Adornado 21	Pts: Ompong Segura 20

Araneta Coliseum, Quezon City

Stan Cherry fired six points in a 10–2 run that shoved Toyota out front, 73-65, and when Crispa closed in to within 71–73, Orly Bauzon and Rodolfo Segura bailed out the Comets, 79-73, with two minutes remaining.

BBC

December 14

Crispa Redmanizers 96, Toyota Comets 91
Scoring by quarter: 21-16, 22–26, 26-26, 27-23
Crispa wins series, 3-2

Araneta Coliseum, Quezon City
Referees: I. Cahanding, E. Cruz

Crispa took an 87–80 lead in the final stretch. Johnny Burks followed fellow import Pete Crotty to the bench with six fouls with still 3:10 left. The Comets came close to within 89–92, with still 1:35 left. Bogs Adornado, who topscored with 18 points, banged in his final basket off Orly Bauzon and though Sonny Jaworski narrowed it down to three, 91–94, Philip Cezar redeemed himself from the previous error by sinking in the clincher for the Redmanizers, a driving lay-up off Ramon Fernandez which triggered off a riot moments later. Toyota coach Dante Silverio, who blamed the referees for the riot, sent in only four men in the last 30 seconds.

== Players' scoring averages ==
Crispa	Total points	Average	Toyota	Total points	Average
Bogs Adornado	96	19.2	Francis Arnaiz	87	17.4
Philip Cezar	90	18	Byron Jones	85	17
Fortunato Co, Jr	60	12	Rodolfo Segura	73	14.6
Rudy Soriano	46	9.2	Robert Jaworski	69	13.8
Bernie Fabiosa	46	9.2	Stan Cherry	65	13
Pete Crotty	43	8.6	Ramon Fernandez	48	9.6
Johnny Burks	38	7.6	Oscar Rocha*	14	3.5

(*) Four games only

== Occurrences ==
On December 14, before a record crowd of 32,000 at the Araneta Coliseum, Crispa finally beats Toyota in the championship series, winning Game five, 96-91, to capture the third conference title, dubbed All-Philippine championship. The final game of the season was marred by two bench-clearing free-for-all incidents, both Crispa and Toyota were fined P10,000 each for the melee, Toyota's Oscar Rocha was meted a nine-month suspension, Crispa's Philip Cezar and Toyota's Alberto Reynoso were suspended in four and a half months and fine each.

== Broadcast notes ==
Game	Play-by-play	Analyst
Game 1		
Game 2		
Game 3		
Game 4		
Game 5		
