= 1977 Crispa Redmanizers season =

- Head coach: Baby Dalupan
- Owner(s): P. Floro and Sons, Inc.

All Filipino Conference results
- Record: 22–2 (91.7%)
- Place: 1st
- Playoff finish: Finals

Open Conference results
- Record: 22–8 (73.3%)
- Place: 1st
- Playoff finish: Finals

Invitational Conference results
- Record: 5–5 (50%)
- Place: 4th
- Playoff finish: N/A

Crispa Redmanizers seasons

The 1977 Crispa Redmanizers season was the 3rd season of the franchise in the Philippine Basketball Association (PBA).

== Colors ==
Crispa Redmanizers
(dark)
(light)

== Occurrences ==
As the 3rd PBA season opens on April 17, the main game features arch rivals Crispa and Toyota. The Redmanizers edge the Toyota Tamaraws, 122-121, on a last-second technical foul on Tamaraws coach Dante Silverio. The match was marred by post-game rumble in the Araneta Coliseum dugout involving players from both teams and the melee involving their fans.

== Summary ==
Two-time MVP Bogs Adornado was out of action for the whole season with an injured knee and despite missing his services, the Redmanizers all but smothered the field, topping the two-round eliminations in the first conference with a 13-1 win-loss record and swept the four-team semifinals. While PBA fans were looking forward to another Crispa-Toyota title clash, the Tamaraws were eliminated from the finals race by the Billy Robinson-led Mariwasa-Honda, it was the first time in seven conferences that Toyota missed a finale.

The Crispa Redmanizers defeated the Panthers in the best-of-five title-series, three games to one, winning their fifth straight championship on July 24 with a 139-128 victory in Game four.

Cyrus Mann return to play for Crispa in the second conference, this time teaming up with Ricky Hicks. The Redmanizers led the way in Group B standings with an 11-3 card and Hicks has since been sent home. In the semifinal round, the U-Tex Wranglers sailed into the championship round in unprecedented fashion and in the process shoved Crispa in a knockout battle against Toyota for the remaining finals berth, the Redmanizers prevail over the Tamaraws in a playoff, 90-87.

In the championship series, U-Tex forced a deciding fifth game, winning games one and four. Crispa finally squeeze through with a 90-88 win in the final game for their sixth straight title which coach Baby Dalupan said was his toughest championship.

Chris McMurray, who previously played for Seven-Up in the second conference, joined Cyrus Mann as the Redmanizers' import for the Invitational Conference, which features the Palmeiras from Brazil, Mann's former team who became known as Emtex Sacronels, and Ramrod Blocks from Australia. Crispa's sudden lack of fire cause the Redmanizers right from the start, losing three straight games and eventually missed the finals for the first time. They placed fourth behind Tanduay.

== Awards ==
With the absence of two-time MVP William "Bogs" Adornado, coming into his own is Freddie Hubalde, who outshown his collegiate teammate Atoy Co in a performance that earned him the league's Most Valuable Player (MVP) award.

== Roster ==
| Roster | # | Position | Height |
|---|---|---|---|
| Abet Guidaben | 5 | Center | 6 ft 5 in (1.96 m) |
| Fortunato Co, Jr ^{Team Captain} | 6 | Guard | 6 ft 1 in (1.85 m) |
| Rodolfo Soriano | 7 | Forward | 6 ft 2 in (1.88 m) |
| Rey Pages | 8 | Forward | 6 ft 1 in (1.85 m) |
| Gregorio Dionisio | 9 | Guard | 5 ft 9 in (1.75 m) |
| Freddie Hubalde | 10 | Guard-forward | 6 ft 1 in (1.85 m) |
| Virgilio Dela Cruz | 12 | Guard-forward | 6 ft 3 in (1.91 m) |
| Tito Varela | 14 | Guard | 6 ft 1 in (1.85 m) |
| Bernie Fabiosa | 15 | Guard | 5 ft 9 in (1.75 m) |
| David Cezar | 16 | Guard | 5 ft 11 in (1.80 m) |
| Armando Torres | 17 | Guard | 6 ft 1 in (1.85 m) |
| Philip Cezar | 18 | Forward | 6 ft 3 in (1.91 m) |
| Rey Franco | 19 | Guard | 5 ft 9 in (1.75 m) |
| Cristino Calilan | 23 | Guard | 5 ft 8 in (1.73 m) |
| Cyrus Mann ^{Import} | 25 | Center | 6 ft 10 in (2.08 m) |
| Ricky Hicks ^{Import} | 27 | Forward | 6 ft 6 in (1.98 m) |
| Chris McMurray ^{Import} | | Forward | 6 ft 7 in (2.01 m) |

_{Assistant Coach: Jaime Lucas Team Manager: Danny Floro}
