= 1977 PBA Open Conference finals =

Team	Coach	Wins
Crispa Redmanizers	Baby Dalupan	3
U-Tex Wranglers	Tommy Manotoc	2
- Dates: November 20–29, 1977
- Television: KBS
- Radio network: DWXL

PBA Open Conference finals chronology
- < 1976 1978 >

The 1977 PBA Open Conference finals is the best-of-5 basketball championship series of the 1977 PBA Open Conference, and the conclusion of the conference's playoffs. The U-Tex Wranglers and Crispa Redmanizers played for the 8th championship contested by the league.

The Crispa Redmanizers defeated the U-Tex Wranglers 3-2 in the finals of the 1977 PBA Open Conference, winning their sixth consecutive PBA title.

== Qualification ==
U-Tex Wranglers		Crispa Redmanizers
Finished 8–6 (.571), 3rd	Eliminations	Finished 11–3 (.786), 1st
8–2 (.800), 1st	Semifinals	7–3 (.700), tied for 2nd
8–2 (.800), 1st	Tiebreaker	Won against Toyota Tamaraws, 90–87

== Games summary ==
KBS

November 20

Crispa Redmanizers 105, U-Tex Wranglers 113

Araneta Coliseum, Quezon City

KBS

November 22

Crispa Redmanizers 103, U-Tex Wranglers 101

Araneta Coliseum, Quezon City

KBS

November 24

Crispa Redmanizers 79, U-Tex Wranglers 76

Araneta Coliseum, Quezon City

KBS

November 27

Crispa Redmanizers 89, U-Tex Wranglers 92

Araneta Coliseum, Quezon City

KBS

November 29

Crispa Redmanizers 90, U-Tex Wranglers 88
Crispa wins series, 3–2

Araneta Coliseum, Quezon City

== Broadcast notes ==
Game	Play-by-play	Analyst
Game 1		
Game 2		
Game 3		
Game 4		
Game 5		
