= 1982 PBA Open Conference finals =

Team	Coach	Wins
Toyota Super Corollas	Edgardo Ocampo	3
Gilbey's Gin	Arturo Valenzona	0
- Dates: December 11–14, 1982
- Television: Vintage Sports (City2)
- Radio network: DWXL

PBA Open Conference finals chronology
- < 1981 1983 >

The 1982 PBA Open Conference finals was the best-of-7 basketball championship series of the 1982 PBA Open Conference, and the conclusion of the conference playoffs.

Toyota Super Corollas scored a 3–0 sweep over first time finalist Gilbey's Gin, to capture their second championship of the season and 9th PBA title.

== Qualification ==
Gilbey's Gin		Toyota Super Corollas
Finished 13–5 (.722), tied for 1st	Eliminations	Finished 8–10 (.444), tied for 4th
Outright semis	Quarterfinals	Finished 2–1 (.667)
Finished 4–2 (.667), 1st	Semifinals	Finished 3–3 (.500), tied for 2nd
Finished 4–2 (.667), 1st	Tiebreaker	Won against N-Rich, 114–97

== Games summary ==
=== Game 1 ===
Vintage

December 11

Toyota Super Corollas 108, Gilbey's Gin 100

Araneta Coliseum, Quezon City

=== Game 2 ===
Vintage

December 12

Toyota Super Corollas 121, Gilbey's Gin 107
Pts: Abe King 34 Donnie Ray Koonce 31	Pts: Larry McNeill 34

Araneta Coliseum, Quezon City

Francis Arnaiz and Abe King combined for an 8–0 blast late in the second half to bail the Corollas out of trouble, 114–103, with time down to 2:13.

=== Game 3 ===
Vintage

December 14

Toyota Super Corollas 122, Gilbey's Gin 109
Toyota wins series, 3–0

Araneta Coliseum, Quezon City

Gilbey's led by 17 points late in the second quarter, Donnie Ray Koonce scored six straight points to cut down the Gin's lead to 57–66 at halftime. The tide went in Toyota's favor in the second half with Arnie Tuadles powering a 13–2 run to give Toyota the lead for good, 70–68, the Super Corollas' fastbreaks worked wonders and they steadily pulled away and were ahead, 96–83, at the end of the third period. Toyota posted their biggest lead at 106–90 in the last quarter.

1982 PBA Open Conference Champions

Toyota Super Corollas
9th title

== Rosters ==
Toyota Super Corollas roster
Players
Coaches

Pos.	No.	Nat.	Name	Ht.	Wt.
C	1	(United States)	Andrew Fields (I)	6 ft 8 in (2.03 m)		Cheyney
F/C	6	(Philippines)	Abe King	6 ft 3 in (1.91 m)		San Beda
G	7	(Philippines)	Robert Jaworski (injured)	6 ft 0 in (1.83 m)		UE
G	8	(Philippines)	Francis Arnaiz	5 ft 10 in (1.78 m)		Ateneo
F/C	10	(Philippines)	Ramon Fernandez	6 ft 4 in (1.93 m)		San Carlos
G/F	11	(Philippines)	Arnie Tuadles	6 ft 2 in (1.88 m)		Visayas
G/F	13	(Philippines)	Timoteo Coloso	6 ft 2 in (1.88 m)		Letran
F	15	(Philippines)	Ricky Relosa	6 ft 4 in (1.93 m)		Mapúa
F/C	17	(Philippines)	Antero Saldaña	6 ft 3 in (1.91 m)		Letran
F	18	(Philippines)	Emerito Legaspi	5 ft 11 in (1.80 m)		UE
F	20	(Philippines)	Nicanor Bulaong	6 ft 3 in (1.91 m)		Far Eastern
G/F	22	(Philippines)	Danny Florencio	5 ft 10 in (1.78 m)		UST
G/F	30	(United States)	Donnie Ray Koonce (I)	6 ft 3 in (1.91 m)		North Carolina
F	41	(Philippines)	Leopoldo Herrera	6 ft 2 in (1.88 m)		Wesleyan Philippines
F/C	88	(Philippines)	Edgardo Cordero	6 ft 4 in (1.93 m)		UST

Head coach

- (Philippines) Ed Ocampo

Assistant coach(es)

- (Philippines) Rino Salazar

Legend

- (C) Team captain
- (I) Import
- Injured

Gilbey's Gin roster
Players
Coaches

Pos.	#	POB	Name	Height	Weight	DOB (YYYY–MM–DD)	From
G	1	(Philippines)	Joseph Herrera	6 ft 0 in (1.83 m)			Letran
F	5	(Philippines)	Rudy Garcia	6 ft 0 in (1.83 m)
G/F	6	(Philippines)	Conrado Pasco	6 ft 2 in (1.88 m)			Far Eastern
F	8	(Philippines)	Marlowe Jacutin	6 ft 0 in (1.83 m)			Visayas
F/C	10	(Philippines)	Eduardo Ducut	6 ft 5 in (1.96 m)			Letran
F	12	(Philippines)	Valerio Delos Santos	6 ft 2 in (1.88 m)			Far Eastern
G/F	15	(Philippines)	Alex Clariño	6 ft 2 in (1.88 m)			Lyceum
F/C	17	(Philippines)	Eusebio Del Rosario	6 ft 2 in (1.88 m)			UE
F/C	18	(Philippines)	Nathaniel Castillo	6 ft 2 in (1.88 m)			Letran
F	20	(Philippines)	Rolando Buhay	6 ft 3 in (1.91 m)			NCBA
G	21	(Philippines)	Jerry Pingoy	5 ft 10 in (1.78 m)			Visayas
G/F	23	(United States)	Lew Massey (I)	6 ft 5 in (1.96 m)			North Carolina
G	24	(Philippines)	Wilfredo Generalao	5 ft 8 in (1.73 m)			Visayas
C	31	(United States)	Larry McNeill (I)	6 ft 9 in (2.06 m)			Marquette

Head coach

- (Philippines) Arturo Valenzona

Assistant coach(es)

Legend

- (C) Team captain
- (CI) Commissioner's Cup Import
- (GI) Governors' Cup Import
- (EI) EASL Import
- (DP) Unsigned draft pick
- (FA) Free agent
- (IN) Inactive
- (S) Suspended
- (R) Rookie
- (I) Import
- Injured

== Broadcast notes ==
Game	Play-by-play	Analyst	Courtside reporters
Game 1			
Game 2			
Game 3			
