= 1976 PBA All-Philippine Championship =

Philippine Basketball Championship

1976 PBA All-Philippine Championship finals
Team	Coach	Wins
Crispa Redmanizers	Baby Dalupan	3
Toyota Silver Tamaraws	Dante Silverio	2
- Dates: December 12–21, 1976
- Television: GTV
- Announcers: DWXL

PBA All-Philippine Championship finals chronology
- < 1975

The 1976 PBA All-Philippine Championship was the third and last conference of the 1976 PBA season. It started on November 28 and ended on December 21, 1976. The Crispa Redmanizers and the Toyota Silver Tamaraws played for the sixth straight time in the finals.

The Crispa Redmanizers overcame a 0–2 series deficit to win over the Toyota Silver Tamaraws, three games to two, and became the league's first Grand Slam champion.

== Elimination round ==
Qualified for finals
Qualified for battle for third

#	Team Standings	W	L	PCT	GB
1	Toyota Silver Tamaraws	4	0	1.000	–
2	Crispa Redmanizers	2	2	.500	2
3	Noritake Porcelain Makers	2	2	.500	2
4	U/Tex Wranglers	1	3	.250	3
5	Royal Tru-Orange	1	3	.250	3

Crispa defeated Noritake in a playoff match on December 9 for the right to meet Toyota in the championship.

== Battle for third ==
GTV

December 12

U/Tex Wranglers 106, Noritake Porcelain Makers 95

Araneta Coliseum, Quezon City

GTV

December 14

U/Tex Wranglers 129, Noritake Porcelain Makers 134 (2OT)

Araneta Coliseum, Quezon City

GTV

December 16

U/Tex Wranglers 116, Noritake Porcelain Makers 113

Araneta Coliseum, Quezon City

GTV

December 19

U/Tex Wranglers 133, Noritake Porcelain Makers 117
U-Tex wins series, 3-1

Araneta Coliseum, Quezon City

== Finals ==
GTV

December 12

Crispa Redmanizers 90, Toyota Silver Tamaraws 100
Scoring by quarter: 22-21, 18–26, 33-28, 17–25
Pts: Cyrus Mann 21	Pts: Francis Arnaiz 32

Araneta Coliseum, Quezon City

Francis Arnaiz and Robert Jaworski took charge in finally applying the brakes on Crispa's last-ditch offensive, unleashing a telling 10–2 blast that gave Toyota an unreachable 97–86 lead, one minute and 30 seconds left.

GTV

December 14

Crispa Redmanizers 117, Toyota Silver Tamaraws 118 (OT)
Scoring by quarter: 21–31, 24-22, 32-30, 29-23, Overtime: 11–12
Pts: Atoy Co 41	Pts: Byron Jones 29

Araneta Coliseum, Quezon City

Francis Arnaiz banged in his team's last six points in overtime from an imposing 115–110 Crispa spread and insuring a Toyota victory with a clinching drive in the last five seconds that propelled Toyota on top, 118–115. Four Silver Tamaraws fouled out just before the extension period. The Silver Tamaraws blew a six-point lead in regulation, 106–100, with 1:30 left, the fighting Redmanizers level the count at 106-all on a split charities by Bernie Fabiosa that forces overtime.

GTV

December 16

Crispa Redmanizers 115, Toyota Silver Tamaraws 105
Scoring by quarter: 28–34, 34-17, 22–24, 31-30
Pts: Atoy Co 34	Pts: Francis Arnaiz 22

Araneta Coliseum, Quezon City

A 5–0 blast in the last 60 seconds, four of them by Freddie Hubalde, put Crispa ahead and beyond recall, 115–103, after the Silver Tamaraws briefly threatened with five minutes left in the ballgame. Atoy Co sizzled with 34 points as he combined with Cyrus Mann, who hauled down rebounds and block shots. Though Francis Arnaiz fired 22 points for Toyota, Ramon Fernandez was limited to only 11 while Robert Jaworski finished with only seven points.

GTV

December 19

Crispa Redmanizers 104, Toyota Tamaraws 103
Scoring by quarter: 23–28, 23-22, 35-23, 23–30
Pts: Atoy Co 25	Pts: Francis Arnaiz 24

Araneta Coliseum, Quezon City

A jumper by Cyrus Mann with 30 seconds left provided the Redmanizers the victory and sent the title series to a rubbermatch. The Silver Tamaraws rallied in the last two minutes from a 91–102 deficit. Crispa got their biggest lead of 14 points, 89–75, at the start of the fourth period on an 8–2 run with Atoy Co hitting two baskets and Mann and Philip Cezar combined for two points each.

GTV

December 21

Crispa Redmanizers 110, Toyota Silver Tamaraws 92
Pts: Atoy Co 39	Pts: Byron Jones 17
Crispa wins series, 3-2

Araneta Coliseum, Quezon City

Fortunato "Atoy" Co rattled six straight points to give Crispa an 11-point spread at the half, 51–40. The Silver Tamaraws came back strongly in the third quarter with eight successive points to narrow the gap at 48–51. The Redmanizers did not panic and a 9–2 salvo gave them a 10-point lead quickly, 60–50.

The Redmanizers answered the Silver Tamaraws basket for basket and in the last two minutes, the Silver Tamaraws, demoralized by the impending defeat, lowered their guards completely, allowing Crispa to scored their biggest winning margin in the series.

== Broadcast notes ==
Game	Play-by-play	Analyst
Game 1	Dick Ildefonso	Emy Arcilla
Game 2	Dick Ildefonso	Emy Arcilla
Game 3	Dick Ildefonso	Emy Arcilla
Game 4	Dick Ildefonso	Emy Arcilla
Game 5	Dick Ildefonso	Emy Arcilla
