= Ompong Segura =

Filipino basketball player

Personal information
- Born: April 17, 1951 (age 75) Paco, Manila, Philippines
- Listed height: 6 ft 2 in (1.88 m)
- Listed weight: 152 lb (69 kg)

Career information
- College: Adamson
- Position: Forward
- Number: 5 (UAAP); 15 (PBA)

Career history
- 1969-72: Adamson Falcons
- 1972: RP Youth
- 1972-1974: Toyota Comets
- 1975-77: Toyota Tamaraws
- 1978–79: Mariwasa Noritake Porcelain Makers
- 1979-80: U/Tex Wranglers
- 1983-84: Manhattan/Sunkist/Winston Kings

Career highlights
- As player: 4× PBA champion
Medals
Men's basketball
Representing the Philippines
Gold medal – first place	1972 Asian Basketball Confederation	Team competition

Rodolfo "Ompong" Segura (born April 17, 1951) is a Filipino former professional basketball player. He played forward for the Adamson Falcons in the University Athletic Association of the Philippines (UAAP) and won championships for the Philippine national team and his teams in the Philippine Basketball Association (PBA) in the pro league's early years.

Segura is also a former basketball coach and trained young Filipinos in basketball clinics, including that of Milo Best Center.

== Collegiate and pre-PBA career ==
A 6'2" forward, Segura first played for the Adamson Falcons in the UAAP. He would later help the RP Youth win a crown in the 1972 ABC Under-18 Championship with teammates Atoy Co, Ramon Fernandez, Philip Cezar, Edgardo Carvajal, Rino Salazar, Miguel Bilbao, Rey Franco, fellow Adamson Falcon Gregorio Dionisio, among others.

When Toyota was not in the PBA yet, its winning tradition was seen in the MICAA with eventual pro players Segura, Robert Jaworski, Francis Arnaiz, Fernandez, Robert Concepcion, Orly Bauzon, Fort Acuña, and the Reynoso brothers Big Boy and Cristino.

== Professional career ==
=== Toyota ===
In 1975, Segura was part of the first PBA champion team Toyota Comets. Under coach Dante Silverio, they would later win more championships in the pro league, more notably over their archrivals, the Crispa Redmanizers. His best average of close to 22 points, 4.32 rebounds, 1.49 assists, and .63 steals a game happened in his first PBA year.

=== Mariwasa ===
Segura's second PBA team was Mariwasa where he played 26 games in 1978.

=== U/Tex ===
Segura retained his double-digit scoring average as a U/Tex Wrangler in 1979.

=== MSW ===
Segura played two more games as a Winston King, wrapping up his PBA career with 223 games played and averaging 14.71 points a game.

=== Post-retirement ===
Segura accepted coaching offers in various leagues and took training and leadership roles in the conduct of basketball clinics of Milo and other companies.

Segura reunited with his alma mater in the 1990s and early 2000s when he was named assistant coach of the Lady Falcons, who won several championships in the UAAP under head coach Emelia Vega. He was also the assistant coach of the Pampanga Dragons, who won the first championship of the defunct Metropolitan Basketball Association (MBA) under head coach Aric del Rosario.

Another sort of reunion occurred at the rekindling of the Crispa-Toyota rivalry but with a twist, as they were past their prime and opted to play for the fans in a PBA All-Star game at the Araneta Coliseum in 2003.

== See also ==
- Philippine Basketball Association
- Philippine national basketball team
- History of Philippine Basketball

== Notes ==
- 1989-1990 PBA Annual. Philippines: Philippine Basketball Association. 1990.
- Liwayway. Liwayway Pub. 1973. 1973.
- Examiner:The Coming of Cage Wars. L.O. Ty. 1973.
