= 1983 PBA Open Conference finals =

Team	Coach	Wins
Crispa Redmanizers	Tommy Manotoc	3
Great Taste Coffee Makers	Baby Dalupan	0
- Dates: November 27 – December 1, 1983
- Television: Vintage Sports (City2)
- Radio network: DZRP

Referees
- Game 3: E. Cruz, F. Sta. Rina, A. dela Cruz

PBA Open Conference finals chronology
- < 1982 1985 >

The 1983 PBA Open Conference finals was the best-of-5 basketball championship series of the 1983 PBA Open Conference, and the conclusion of the conference playoffs.

The Crispa Redmanizers achieved a historic 2nd Grand Slam, repeating over Great Taste Coffee Makers, this time via 3–0 sweep in their best-of-five finals series.

== Qualification ==
Crispa Redmanizers		Great Taste Coffee Makers
Finished 9–5 (.643), outright semis	Eliminations	Finished 9–5 (.643), outright semis
Finished 3–3 (.500)	Semifinals	Finished 3–3 (.500)
Won against San Miguel, 130–120	Playoff	Won against Gilbey's, 126–118

== Games summary ==
=== Game 1 ===
Vintage

November 27

recap

Crispa Redmanizers 118, Great Taste Coffee Makers 113
Scoring by quarter: 22–26, 38–29, 28–36, 30–22
Pts: Billy Ray Bates 29 Larry Demic 28	Pts: Norman Black 43

Araneta Coliseum, Quezon City

The Redmanizers engaged the Coffee Makers in a nip-and-tuck battle before coming up with a 9–2 windup in the last one minute and 55 seconds to pull off the victory. Behind 109–111, the Redmanizers equalized on a jumpshot by Atoy Co with 1:39 left before Philip Cezar put Crispa ahead for good, 113–111, on a fastbreak pitch by Billy Ray Bates with 59 seconds to go, Ricardo Brown of Great Taste missed a three-point shot and Bates put in what proved to be the winning points on a foul by Brown with 11 ticks remaining.

=== Game 2 ===
Vintage

November 29

recap

Crispa Redmanizers 149, Great Taste Coffee Makers 132
Scoring by quarter: 35–30, 34–21, 36–37, 44–44
Pts: Billy Ray Bates 63	Pts: Norman Black 45 Ricardo Brown 28

Araneta Coliseum, Quezon City

From a 35–30 first period advantage, Crispa poured on the heat and was up by 22 points early in the third quarter, 73–51. The Coffee Makers tried to mount a rally but the closest they got was within eight points twice, the last at 123–131 with 3:25 left, another 14–5 flurry by the Redmanizers wrapped up the contest.

=== Game 3 ===
Vintage

December 1

Crispa Redmanizers 133, Great Taste Coffee Makers 113
Scoring by quarter: 29–31, 35–31, 28–28, 41–23
Pts: Billy Ray Bates 58	Pts: Norman Black 39
Crispa wins series, 3–0

Araneta Coliseum, Quezon City
Referees: E. Cruz, F. Sta. Rina, A. dela Cruz

Billy Ray Bates hit all of his first five jumpers, including a three-point shot in the last quarter as the black superman unleashed 21 of his 58 points in the final 12 minutes to spark the Redmanizers' runaway victory and a second grandslam. The see-saw encounter turned into a devastating rout through a 25–13 splurge for a 117–103 Crispa advantage.

1983 PBA Open Conference Champions

Crispa Redmanizers
12th title

== Rosters ==
Crispa Redmanizers roster
Players
Coaches

Pos.	No.	Nat.	Name	Ht.	Wt.
G/F	2	(United States)	Billy Ray Bates (I)	6 ft 3 in (1.91 m)	212 lb (96 kg)	Kentucky State
F/C	5	(Philippines)	Abet Guidaben	6 ft 5 in (1.96 m)	180 lb (82 kg)	USJ-R
G	6	(Philippines)	Fortunato Co, Jr	6 ft 1 in (1.85 m)	168 lb (76 kg)	Mapúa
G/F	7	(Philippines)	Arturo Cristobal	6 ft 1 in (1.85 m)	170 lb (77 kg)	Far Eastern
G/F	9	(Philippines)	Padim Israel	6 ft 3 in (1.91 m)	160 lb (73 kg)	Ateneo
F	10	(Philippines)	Freddie Hubalde	6 ft 1 in (1.85 m)	175 lb (79 kg)	Mapúa
F/C	13	(Philippines)	Elpidio Villamin	6 ft 2 in (1.88 m)	188 lb (85 kg)
G	14	(Philippines)	Tito Varela	6 ft 1 in (1.85 m)	165 lb (75 kg)	UE
G	15	(Philippines)	Bernie Fabiosa	5 ft 9 in (1.75 m)	160 lb (73 kg)	UE
F	16	(Philippines)	Angelito Esguerra	6 ft 3 in (1.91 m)	180 lb (82 kg)	Letran
F	18	(Philippines)	Philip Cezar	6 ft 3 in (1.91 m)	170 lb (77 kg)	José Rizal
G	24	(Philippines)	Ramon Cruz	5 ft 11 in (1.80 m)	155 lb (70 kg)	UE
C	25	(United States)	Larry Demic (I)	6 ft 9 in (2.06 m)	220 lb (100 kg)	Arizona

Head coach

- (Philippines) Tommy Manotoc

Assistant coach(es)

- (Philippines) Narciso Bernardo

Legend

- (C) Team captain
- (I) Import
- Injured

Great Taste Coffee roster
Players
Coaches

Pos.	No.	Nat.	Name	Ht.	Wt.
F/C	1	(Philippines)	Manny Victorino	6 ft 5 in (1.96 m)	200 lb (91 kg)	José Rizal
G/F	2	(Philippines)	Alejo Alolor	6 ft 1 in (1.85 m)	160 lb (73 kg)	Visayas
G/F	3	(Philippines)	Jaime Manansala	5 ft 11 in (1.80 m)	160 lb (73 kg)	UE
F/C	6	(Philippines)	Joel Banal	6 ft 4 in (1.93 m)	163 lb (74 kg)	Mapúa
C	7	(United States)	Dawan Scott (I)	6 ft 9 in (2.06 m)	230 lb (104 kg)	Seton Hall
G	10	(Philippines)	Eduardo Mendoza	6 ft 0 in (1.83 m)	165 lb (75 kg)	Visayas
C	11	(Philippines)	Florendo Ritualo	6 ft 3 in (1.91 m)	190 lb (86 kg)	Baguio
G	16	(Philippines)	Leonardo Paguntalan	6 ft 1 in (1.85 m)	182 lb (83 kg)	Western Institute
G	23	(United States)	Ricardo Brown	6 ft 0 in (1.83 m)	175 lb (79 kg)	Pepperdine
F	24	(United States)	Norman Black (I)	6 ft 5 in (1.96 m)	190 lb (86 kg)	Saint Joseph's
F	29	(Philippines)	Bernardo Carpio	6 ft 3 in (1.91 m)	188 lb (85 kg)	Ateneo
G/F	33	(Philippines)	Bogs Adornado	6 ft 1 in (1.85 m)	175 lb (79 kg)	UST
F	66	(Philippines)	Joey Marquez	6 ft 2 in (1.88 m)	175 lb (79 kg)	Angeles

Head coach

- (Philippines) Baby Dalupan

Assistant coach(es)

- (Philippines) Jimmy Mariano

Legend

- (C) Team captain
- (I) Import
- Injured

== Broadcast notes ==
Game	Play-by-play	Analyst
Game 1	Pinggoy Penson	Andy Jao & Steve Kattan
Game 2	Joe Cantada	Joaqui Trillo
Game 3	Joe Cantada	Andy Jao
