= Bogs Adornado =

Filipino basketball player and coach

Personal information
- Born: May 26, 1951 (age 75) Batad, Iloilo, Philippines
- Listed height: 6 ft 2 in (187 cm)
- Listed weight: 170 lb (77 kg)

Career information
- College: UST
- PBA draft: 1975 Elevated
- Drafted by: Crispa Redmanizers
- Playing career: 1970–1987
- Position: Small forward
- Number: 11, 33
- Coaching career: 1988–2021

Career history

Playing
- 1970–1979: Crispa
- 1980–1982: U/Tex
- 1983–1984: Great Taste
- 1985–1986: Shell
- 1987: Hills Bros

Coaching
- 1988: Alaska Milkmen
- 1991–1992: Crispa 400
- 1997: Mobiline Phone Pals (assistant)
- 2007: Adamson
- 2019–2021: Blackwater Elite / Blackwater Bossing (assistant)

Career highlights
- As player: 8× PBA champion (1975 All-Philippine, 1976 First, 1976 Second, 1976 All-Philippine, 1979 All-Filipino, 1980 Open, 1984 Second All-Filipino, 1984 Invitational); FIBA Asia Cup MVP (1973); PBA Hall of Fame Class of 2005; 50 Greatest Players in PBA History (2000 selection); 3× PBA Most Valuable Player (1975, 1976, 1981); 7× PBA Mythical Five/Mythical First Team 1975–1976, 1980–1985); PBA Mythical Second Team (1984); PBA Grand Slam champion (1976); 3× PBA scoring champion (1980–1982); As head coach: PBL champion (1991 PBL Maharlika Cup)
Medals
Men's basketball
Representing Philippines
ABC Championship
Silver medal – second place	1971 Tokyo	Team
Gold medal – first place	1973 Manila	Team

William "Bogs" Adornado (born May 26, 1951) is a Filipino professional basketball former coach and player. He is one of the Philippine Basketball Association's Greatest Players and was inducted into its Hall of Fame in 2005. He was a three-time PBA Most Valuable Player (1975, 1976, and 1981) and is considered one of the best Filipino basketball players of all time.

== Amateur career ==
Adornado, who began playing hoops at the age of six, was a legend playing for the then Glowing Goldies of the University of Santo Tomas under the tutelage of Rogelio Serafico. At center, he was a consistent ace shooter and did a remarkable sniping job for the Espana-based dribblers in their Universities Athletic Association of the Philippines (UAAP) exploits. In the 1967–68 season, which was his rookie year, Adornado led the UST Goldies to the championship against University of the East, which ended up with UST and UE being declared co-champions.

Adornado's next step to the apex of his amateur career came when he was tapped to serve in the RP Youth squad, which saw flawless action in the inaugural Asian Youth Basketball Championship in Seoul, South Korea in 1970. Mentored by Ignacio "Ning" Ramos, Adornado joined efforts with Ernesto Estrada, Rosario Martires, Marte Samson, Manny Paner, Johnny Revilla, and Rodolfo Soriano to clinch the tournament's championship after sweeping all their 6 games. From then on, Adornado would become a mainstay for the Philippine national teams that competed for basketball supremacy in Asia, the Olympics, and the World. He was the youngest member of the Philippine Men's Olympic basketball team that placed 13th in the 1972 Munich Games. He was a key contributor in winning back the gold (after a silver finish in 1971) for the Philippines in the 1973 Asian Basketball Confederation Championships held in Manila. His 18 ppg top scored for the Philippine team that placed 13th in the 1974 World Championships in San Juan, Puerto Rico.

Commercially, Adornado played for Crispa in the old Manila Industrial and Commercial Athletic Association (MICAA), where he played with Jun Papa and Danny Florencio. With Papa shooting the lights out from 30 to 35 feet, and Florencio's magical penetrating moves under the basket, Adornado provided a steady presence with his calculated jumpers from medium range as Crispa would win the 1971 MICAA All-Filipino crown at the expense of the San Miguel Braves. Crispa would win one more MICAA crown in 1974, a year before the PBA was born. Among his teammates then were Alberto Guidaben, Atoy Co, Edgardo Carvajal, and Rodolfo Soriano.

== PBA career ==
One of the pioneers of the Philippine Basketball Association when the league was formed in 1975, Adornado began his professional career with powerhouse Crispa Redmanizers under legendary coach Virgilio "Baby" Dalupan. On April 27, 1975, marked the PBA debut of the sweet shooting forward from Bicol, scoring 32 points to lead Crispa past Tanduay. With Adornado leading the offensive juggernaut along with luminaries Philip Cezar and Atoy Co, Crispa won the '75 Invitational, preempting a Toyota grand slam in PBA's maiden season. Adornado was also awarded the first PBA Most Valuable Player (MVP), an award he would also win in '76. On July 11, 1976, with Crispa winning the All-Filipino Conference, Adornado scored 24 points to become the first player to reach 2,000 points. In the 1976 Open Conference, Adornado suffered a knee injury that forced him to miss action for the rest of the season and also the following year. Having recovered from the injury that almost ended his playing career, he came back in 1978 but played sparingly as his old starting forward spot was already taken by 1977 MVP awardee Freddie Hubalde. As he was slowly regaining his old form, Crispa won another championship at the expense of rival Toyota in the All Filipino Conference of the 1979 PBA season.

In 1980, after playing only seven games for Crispa, the Redmanizers released Adornado to the U/Tex Wranglers for the sum of 100,000 PhP. Teaming up with Lim Eng Beng and reinforced by imports Aaron James and Glenn McDonald, led U/Tex to a memorable comeback win over the Toyota Tamaraws in the 1980 PBA Open Conference championship. The game was marked by U/Tex's "miracle" run as they wiped out a 4-point deficit with 16 seconds left in regulation and won in overtime on a basket by Adornado with 1:25 remaining in the game. On November 30, 1980, in a game between the Wranglers and the San Miguel Beermen, Adornado played perhaps the best game of his PBA career as he scored 64 points, grabbed 12 rebounds, handed out 3 assists and made 1 block shot in 40:42 minutes of playing time. The 64 points was the highest ever by a local player at that time, a record he shared with Danny Florencio. That same season, Adornado cracked the Mythical 5for the third time in his PBA career, a classic case of retribution. In 1981, Adornado won his third MVP award while powering the Wranglers to a runner-up finish in the 1981 Reinforced Conference finals against Crispa. The 1,334 points he scored in 51 games was the most scored by any player in 1981.

The U/Tex Wranglers disbanded as a team at the end of the 1982 PBA season. The players were spread out into different teams with Adornado going to Great Taste Coffee Makers. Teaming up with prized Filipino-American (Fil-Am) rookie cager in Ricardo Brown instantly transformed Great Taste as a team to contend with. In their first year playing together, the dynamic duo would power the Coffee Makers to two runner-up finishes against eventual grand slam winner Crispa while also being awarded spots on the Mythical 5. In 1984, having reunited with ex-Crispa coach Virgilio Dalupan, Adornado was in the forefront of a Great Taste's breakthrough, winning the PBA 2nd Conference (2nd of two All-Filipino conferences that year) against the Ramon Fernandez-led Beer Hausen team and also the 3rd Conference (Reinforced) against the mighty Crispa Redmanizers while being reinforced by eventual best import awardee Jeff Collins. The loss of Crispa to Great Taste in the championship series also marked the end of Crispa's existence in the PBA as the team would disband after the season.

In 1985, Adornado played for rookie team Shell Azodrin Bugbusters along with former Crispa teammates Philip Cezar and Bernie Fabiosa. In a game against Beer Hausen, he became the 3rd player to reach the 10,000 point mark behind ex-Crispa teammate Atoy Co and Mon Fernandez. With Adornado as the team's catalyst and primary offensive weapon, Shell made its first Finals appearance in its first PBA season against powerhouse Great Taste Coffee in the All-Filipino Conference. Shell fought valiantly against Adornado's former team, losing in four games, with Adornado leading all scorers in the series with a 34.5 ppg average. That same season, Adornado would claim his 7th Mythical 5 award, the last of his career.

In 1987, Adornado joined the Hills Bros Coffee Kings for his final season in the league. Teaming up with the famed Bruise Brothers tandem of Elpidio Villamin and Ricardo Relosa, Adornado helped the Coffee Kings to two runner-up finishes even as he was already showing signs of slowing down. Adornado's number 33 was retired by the Alaska franchise and was honored at the opening of the 1988 PBA season.

Adornado converted 69 consecutive free throws from October 14, 1986, until August 7, 1987, a record that stood for six years until a new sweet-shooting forward in the mold of Adornado by the name of Allan Caidic broke it with 76 consecutive free shots made.

Adornado played a total of 12 seasons with an impressive career average of 20.4 ppg (currently 2nd all-time best among locals). Aside from winning the MVP award 3 times, he was a member of 8 Mythical Team Selections. He was a prolific scorer armed with a deadly outside shot, leading the league in scoring in 5 different seasons.

== Legacy ==
In 2000, he was named as one of the PBA's 25 greatest players of all time in elaborate awards ceremonies that highlighted the 25th anniversary of the league.

In 2005, Adornado was part of the twelve initial inductees to the PBA Hall of Fame alongside fellow Crispa players Atoy Co and Philip Cezar, and Toyota stalwarts Jaworski, Francis Arnaiz and Ramon Fernandez together with former PBA Commissioners Leo Prieto, Emerson Coseteng and Atty. Rudy Salud as well as legendary Crispa coach and team manager, respectively, Virgilio "Baby" Dalupan and Danny Floro, and the late anchorman Joe Cantada.

In September 2010, the 2009-2010 Comeback Player of the Year, presented by Phoenix Petroleum, will be awarded the William "Bogs" Adornado Trophy in honor of the PBA's multi-titled player and Hall of Famer, who generously agreed to lend his fabled name for the award. The name of Adornado being mentioned in the same breath with the Comeback Player of the Year award was a fitting tribute to the player who became the first to win the PBA MVP award three times.

"It's such a big honor to have the Comeback Player Award named after me," said Adornado, who overcame open surgery and a long and painful recuperation period to make history. "It's nice to be remembered this way."

== Coaching career ==
Head coach:

- Alaska (1988)
- Crispa 400 (1991–1992, PBL)
- Adamson Falcons (2007, UAAP)

Assistant coach:

- Alaska (1988)
- Crispa 400 (1990–1991, PBL)
- Mobiline (1997)
- Ateneo Blue Eagles (2002–2003, UAAP)
- Shell Turbo Chargers (2004-2005)
- Adamson Falcons (2007, UAAP)
- Philippine Patriots (2009-2010, ABL)
- Blackwater Elite / Blackwater Bossing (2019)

== Coaching record ==
=== PBA record ===
Season	Team	Season	Eliminations					Playoffs				
Season	Team	Season	G	W	L	PCT	Finish	PG	W	L	PCT	Results
1988	Alaska	Reinforced	10	5	5	.500	4th	8	1	7	.125	Did not qualify
1989	Alaska	Open	10	3	7	.222	—	—	—	—	—	(Fired)
Totals			20	8	12	.400		0	1	7	.125	0 PBA championship

=== Collegiate record ===
Season	Team	Eliminations						Playoffs			
Season	Team	G	W	L	PCT	Finish	PG	W	L	PCT	Results
2007	AdU	14	2	12	.143	7th	—	—	—	—	Eliminated
Totals		14	2	12	.143		0 championships				

== Career highlights ==
=== PBA ===
- 3-time Most Valuable Player (1975, 1976, 1981)
- 7-time Mythical First Team Selection (1975, 1976, 1980, 1981, 1982, 1983, 1985)
- Mythical Second Team Selection (1984)
- 5-time PBA Scoring Leader
- Member 5,000 point club
- Member 10,000 point club
- PBA Hall of Fame (Class of 2005)
- PBA's 25 Greatest Players
- Member of the 1976 Crispa Grand Slam Team
- 10-time PBA Champion - Crispa (7), U/Tex (1), Great Taste (2)

=== Others ===
- Member 1970 Asian Youth Basketball Championship (1st place)
- Member 1971 Asian Basketball Confederation (2nd place)
- Member 1972 Munich Olympics (13th place)
- Member 1973 Asian Basketball Confederation (1st place)
- Member 1974 World Championships (13th place)

=== Records and oddities ===
64 points U/Tex win over San Miguel 126-111 (11/23/80)

54 points U/Tex win over Presto 121-105 (11/80)

50 points U/Tex win over Gilbey's 116-110 (06/10/82)

46 points Crispa vs Royal Tru-Orange (07/07/75)

46 points Crispa vs Carrier (10/13/75)

46 points Crispa vs U/Tex (10/15/75)

46 points Shell loss to GTC 106-113 (08/15/85)

43 points U/Tex loss to Tanduay 97-121 (11/15/80)

43 points GTC loss to Winston 163-167 OT (10/25/83)

42 points U/Tex loss to YCO-Tanduay 121-122 (09/01/81)

41 points U/Tex win over Honda 98-96 (10/25/80)

41 points U/Tex win over Honda 96-85 (11/13/80)

41 points U/Tex loss to Toyota 104-110 (11/18/80)

41 points Shell win over NCC 106-104 (09/19/85)

41 points Shell win Over Tanduay 119-116 OT (08/06/85)

5-time Season Scoring Leader: '75 (26.96 ppg), '76 (25.66 ppg), '80 (24.00 ppg), '81 (26.20 ppg), '82 (27.40 ppg)

69 Consecutive Free-throws made 10/14/86 - 08/07/87

== Trivia ==
- Adornado has the distinction of being the first PBA Most Valuable Player and first back-to-back awardee, winning the award in 1975 and 1976 while averaging a league-leading 26.9 ppg and 25.6 ppg respectively among locals.
- From '75 to '79, the Most Valuable Player (MVP) award was being awarded after the first conference (All-Filipino). Without this ruling, it would have been difficult for Adornado to win the award in '76 as he suffered a serious knee injury in the second conference (Open) and missed the entire third conference (Invitational). Beginning in 1980, the league started handing out awards at the end of the season.
- Arguably, the best head and shoulder faker in the history of the PBA. Opposing defenders would jump on Adornado and oftentimes would even commit fouls. That move helped Adornado lead the league in free-throws made from '80 up to '83.
- Armed with a deadly perimeter game, Adornado didn't really venture into the three-point area as his main arsenal. Made only 46 3-point baskets for his career. Led the league in 2-point field goals made from '80 up to '83.
- If not for the injury, Adornado would have been the fastest to reach 10,000 points. Even after missing almost two full seasons, he still became the third player to accomplish the feat as he reached the mark in 1985.
- Adornado played for the championship in each of the five teams he has played for, winning titles for Crispa, U/Tex, and Great Taste while ending as runners-up with Shell and Hills Bros.
- One of three players who have won the PBA Most Valuable Player Award at least 3 times. The others being Ramon "El Presidente" Fernandez (82, 84, 86, and 88) and Alvin "The Captain" Patrimonio (91, 93, 94, and 97).
- His best season was in '81, not only did he win his 3rd MVP award, he also led the league in scoring, free-throws made, 2-point field goals, and minutes played.

== Quotes ==
"When I played with Bogs at Great Taste, he had already undergone several knee surgeries, so he was somewhat limited with his overall speed and quickness. However, he more than made up for that on the offensive end with a huge repertoire of offensive skills:dead-eye shooter from up to 20 feet, great offensive moves from the mid-post, automatic from the free throw line, and maybe the best head and shoulder fake in the history of the PBA."

- Ricardo Brown (Teammate with Great Taste)

"When I got Bogs toward the latter part of his career. He had a knee injury and people said "wala na, hindi na pwede." (He no longer has it, he can't play anymore). But it was Andy Jao who kept saying, "Partner, pwede pa 'yan." (Partner, he still got it). He was such a fan of Bogs. So we gambled on Bogs. We set up a lot of plays for him. He knew where he was going, he knew where the screen was coming. He was not playing one-on-one basketball. He was playing set-up basketball. I would say he is one of our all-time greats. And the longevity of his career as a shooter will prove it. The records he gave Philippine basketball as a shooter will be hard to beat."

- Tommy Manotoc (Head-coach with U/Tex)

"Isang nag-influence sa shooting ko si Bogs (One that influenced my shooting was Bogs). We were teammates, pero pagdating sa game siya ang first option dahil siya ang pinakamagaling ang kamay talaga (but during the game, he was the first option because he's got really the best shooting hand). Na-influence ako dahil kahit teammate ko siya, nagkakaroon kami ng friendly competition (He's influenced me though we're teammates, what we have is a friendly competition). Gusto kong maabot 'yung status na naabot niya. Gusto ko ako rin ang maging first option ng team (I would like to attain the status that he was able to reach. I would like to be the team's first option as well). Kaya lalo kong hinasa ang jumpshot ko, tapos nadagdagan pa ng fadeaway (That's why I really harnessed my jumpshot, and also added a fadeaway). At dahil first option si Bogs, pag na-double team siya, pak, pasa ang bola sa akin (And because Bogs was the first option, if he was double teamed, the pass will come to me). Kailangan mai-shoot ko iyan. Kundi sa susunod baka hindi na ako mabigyan ng bola, sa iba na mapupunta ang pasa (I have to make the shot. If not, I may not be given the ball the next time and it will be to another player)."

- Atoy Co (Teammate with Crispa)

"Mayroon siyang sariling shooting style (He's got his own shooting style). Grabe kung mag-practice (Practices a lot). Madalas ko siyang makita noon, titira ng 200 shots, iba-ibang anggulo, sa isang parte ng court (Oftentimes, I would see him shoot 200 shots from different angles on one side of the court). Tapos lilipat naman sa kabila (Then he would move to the other side). Bale 400 shots lahat (So that's 400 shots in total). Matiyaga (Hard-working). Kaya pagdating ng totoong laban, handang-handa (That's why on an actual game, ready to go)."

- Bernard Fabiosa (Teammate with Crispa and Shell)

"In one championship with Crispa, walo lang kami (there were only eight of us), some were even fetched from the hospital. In those days, when your team only had seven players, you automatically lose by default. That was the fifth game, against Toyota. I didn't play the previous game but that night, I was a starter. In my entire basketball career, I never practiced as a point guard. Even in that particular game, Baby (Dalupan) did not tell me that I was starting as a point guard. He just sent me out there. In the previous game, I noticed that Hubalde was playing forward. When he attracted a double-team, he'd swing the ball but the man at the top of the key couldn't deliver. Atoy Co couldn't get the ball because he was also well-covered. So the next game, the whole evening I was the point guard. We won the championship. I dominated the game. It was my show the whole evening. That's the kind of talent Baby has. Baby has some moves that would just change the face or the tempo of the game. I don't know where he got those ideas. Whoever thought I would be playing as a point guard?"

- Bogs Adornado on Virgilio "Baby" Dalupan

Si Bogs, napaka-wise na player, napakautak (Bogs, was a very wise player, headstrong). Kung ang tao ni Bogs nu'ng nasa Crispa pa kami, medyo parang linta, nagtitinginan na kami ni Bogs (While we were teammates with Crispa, if Bogs' man was sticking to him like a leech, Bogs and I will have this eye-contact). Ako na ang bahalang magbigay ng screen sa kanya (I'll be the one to provide a screen for him). Si Bogs, pag dinepensahan mo iyan sa buong game, di ka makakatapos, mauubos ka sa foul (With Bogs, if you try to guard him for an entire game, you are not going to finish, you are going to foul-out). Kapag nag-fake iyan, siguradong susunod ka, tiyak tatalon ka (If he fakes, for sure you are going to bite). Ang galing ng kamay niya (He's got great hands)."

- Philip Cezar (Teammate with Crispa and Shell)

Preceded by Leo Austria	Adamson Falcons head coach 2007	Succeeded by Leo Austria
Preceded by Turo Valenzona	Alaska Aces head coach 1989	Succeeded by Tim Cone
