= PBA on KBS =

Branding used for PBA telecasts on KBS in the Philippines

- Genre: PBA game telecasts
- Presented by: Various PBA on KBS commentators
- Country of origin: Philippines

Production
- Camera setup: Multiple-camera setup
- Running time: 150 minutes or until game ends
- Production company: KBS Sports

Original release
- Network: RPN
- Release: April 17 – December 18, 1977

Related
- PBA on BBC; PBA on GTV; PBA on Solar TV

PBA on KBS is a Philippine television sports presentation show broadcast by RPN. It aired from April 17, 1977 to December 18, 1977. The consist of branding used for presentation of Philippine Basketball Association (PBA) games produced by KBS Sports.

== History ==
The PBA signed a contract with Kanlaon Broadcasting System (KBS) to cover its 1977 season games for over a million pesos. In 1976, the games were covered by Government Television. The coverage moved to KBS for the 1977 season.

== Broadcasting teams ==
=== 1977 ===
- Play-by-play - Frank Sanchez, Raffy Mejia and Dick Ildenfonso
- Color - Caloy Prieto and Emy Arcilla
- Courtside Reporter/interviewer - Willie Hernandez

== See also ==
- Philippine Basketball Association
- PBA on Solar TV - PBA coverer using the same Channel 9 frequency.

Preceded by PBA on GTV	PBA TV coverage partners 1977	Succeeded by PBA on GTV
