= 1976 PBA season =

Second PBA season

- Duration: March 21 – December 21, 1976
- Teams: 9
- TV partner: GTV
- Season MVP: Bogs Adornado (Crispa Redmanizers)
- First Conference champions: Crispa Redmanizers
- First Conference runners-up: Toyota Silver Tamaraws
- Second Conference champions: Crispa Redmanizers
- Second Conference runners-up: Toyota Silver Tamaraws
- All-Philippine Championship champions: Crispa Redmanizers
- All-Philippine Championship runners-up: Toyota Silver Tamaraws

Seasons
- ← 1975 1977 →

The 1976 PBA season was the second season of the Philippine Basketball Association (PBA).

== Season highlights ==
- The Crispa Redmanizers won all three conferences in the year to cap the first Grand Slam in the PBA.
- On December 21, Crispa achieved the first PBA Grandslam by winning the All-Philippine championship with a 110–92 win over Toyota Tamaraws in the deciding Game five of the finals. The Redmanizers, reinforced by Cyrus Mann and Bill Bunton, were down 0–2 in the series but won the last three games against their arch rivals, which had Byron "Snake" Jones and Howard Smith as their imports.
- William "Bogs" Adornado wins his second Most Valuable Player Award. He also became the first player to reach the 2,000 point plateau when he scored 24 points in Crispa's title-clinching 101–100 win over Toyota in Game four of the First Conference finals on July 11.
- The first-ever triple-overtime game took place on August 17, Noritake outlasts Tanduay, 153–151, on a jumper by Hubert Filipinas to decide the league's longest match.
- Harry Rogers of 7-Up scored 75 points in their 157–134 win over Fiberlite on October 26, becoming the first PBA player/import to reach the 75-point output in a single game.

== Opening ceremonies ==
The muses for the participating teams are as follows:

Team	Muse
Crispa Redmanizers	Valerie Floro
Noritake Porcelain Makers	Josephine Oppus
N-Rich Coffee Creamers	Vangie Sante
Quasar TV Makers	Carmen Ronda
Royal Tru-Orange	Tonette Pineda
7-Up Uncolas	Alma Moreno
Tanduay Distillery	Jane Murphy
Toyota Tamaraws	Marianne de la Riva
U/Tex Wranglers	Mitos Viola

== Champions ==
- First Conference: Crispa Redmanizers
- Second Conference: Crispa Redmanizers
- All-Philippine Championship: Crispa Redmanizers
- Team with best win–loss percentage: Crispa Redmanizers (47–15, .758)
- Best Team of the Year: Crispa Redmanizers (1st)

== Individual awards ==
- Most Valuable Player: Bogs Adornado (Crispa)
- Rookie of the Year: Gil Cortez (Toyota)
- Mythical Five:
  - Francis Arnaiz (Toyota)
  - Atoy Co (Crispa)
  - Ramon Fernandez (Toyota)
  - Bogs Adornado (Crispa)
  - Philip Cezar (Crispa)

== Cumulative standings ==
Team	GP	W	L	PCT
Crispa Redmanizers / Denims	62	47	15	.758
Toyota Silver Tamaraws	61	46	15	.754
U/Tex Wranglers	50	27	23	.540
Noritake Porcelain Makers / Festivals	50	27	23	.540
Royal Tru-Orange	46	22	24	.478
Quasar/Fiberlite	41	13	28	.378
Tanduay Distillery	32	11	21	.344
Seven-Up Uncolas	32	7	25	.219
N-Rich Coffee Creamers	32	3	29	.094

Elimination Round (First And Second Conferences)
Team	W	L	PCT
Toyota	28	4	.875
Crispa	27	5	.844
U/Tex	19	13	.594
Noritake	18	14	.563
Royal	18	14	.563
Quasar/Fiberlite	13	19	.406
Tanduay	11	21	.344
Seven-Up	7	25	.219
N-Rich	3	29	.094

== Notes ==
The first and second conference of the season were officially named as All-Filipino Conference and Open Conference respectively. The first All-Filipino Conference was reclassified as an import-laced tournament since the league gave teams the option to hire foreign players or "imports". Both tournaments were renamed as First and Second Conference based on the records under the "Winners circle over the years" section of the official PBA Annual, Hardcourt, since its 2001 edition.
