= Mariwasa =

Philippine tile manufacturing company

- Company type: Private
- Industry: Construction
- Founded: March 1966; 59 years ago
- Founders: Emerson and Edison Coseteng
- Headquarters: Taguig, Philippines
- Key people: Jakkrit Suwansilp (President)
- Products: Ceramic tiles
- Website: www.mariwasa.com

Mariwasa Siam Ceramics, Inc., more commonly known as Mariwasa (stylized as MARIWASA) is a Philippine tile manufacturing company based in Taguig, Metro Manila, Philippines. Its main plant is situated in Santo Tomas, Batangas.

== History ==
Mariwasa was established in March 1966 by the brothers Emerson and Edison Coseteng and was originally incorporated as the Mariwasa Manufacturing, Inc. (MMI) with its name derived from the Filipino word for "prosperous". It grew to become a major player in the tile industry in the Philippines with Mariwasa exporting some of its products to Hong Kong and the United States.

Mariwasa went public in the Philippine Stock Exchange (PSE) in 1991 which led to the partnership of MMI with Thai firm Siam Cement Group (SCG). The two firms created a joint venture Mariwasa Siam Ceramics, Inc. which was made a subsidiary of MMI. By 1997, it was producing 12,000 square metres (130,000 sq ft) of tiles daily from 1,200 square metres (13,000 sq ft) of daily tile production in its first year of operation. It also opened a modern manufacturing plant in Batangas in the same year.

However starting 1998, the company experienced a financial crisis, registering an average of millions of pesos in net loss for the next few years. Mariwasa stopped trading in the stock exchange in December 1999, decided to close its main tile manufacturing plant in 2001 in Rosario, Pasig, and defaulted in 2003. Mariwas took a $14.5 million loan from the International Finance Corporation in 1999 as part of a restructuring of Mariwasa's financing and operations.

As of 2019, Mariwasa and Formosa Ceramic Tiles Manufacturing Corp. are the two main manufacturing firms involved in the Philippines' tile industry.
