= Cyrus Mann =

American basketball player (1956–2022)

Personal information
- Born: April 2, 1956 Detroit, Michigan, U.S.
- Died: October 15, 2022 (aged 66) Detroit, Michigan, U.S.
- Listed height: 6 ft 9 in (2.06 m)
- Listed weight: 230 lb (104 kg)

Career information
- High school: Southeastern (Detroit, Michigan)
- College: Illinois State (1974–1975)
- NBA draft: 1975: 4th round, 72nd overall pick
- Drafted by: Boston Celtics
- Position: Center
- Number: 27

Career history
- 1976–1979: Crispa Redmanizers
- 1982–1983: Detroit Spirits

Career highlights
- CBA champion (1983); 3× PBA champion (1976 First, 1976 Second, 1977 Open)
- Stats at Basketball Reference

Cyrus Leon Mann Jr. (April 2, 1956 – October 15, 2022) was an American professional basketball player.

== Biography ==
He was selected by the Boston Celtics in the 4th round (72nd pick overall) of the 1975 NBA draft. He played four years in the Philippines for the Crispa Redmanizers in the Philippine Basketball Association. In 1982, Mann staged a comeback with the Continental league champions Detroit Spirits, the 6-10 center averaged 7.8 points and 7.6 rebounds and was ranked seventh in the league in rebounding and second in blocked shots during the CBA playoffs. He won the CBA championship with the Spirits in 1983.

Mann died from COVID-19 at Henry Ford Hospital in Detroit, at age 66.

== PBA career statistics ==
| Season | Team | GP | FG-PCT | REBS. | PTS | AVE. |
|---|---|---|---|---|---|---|
| 1976 | Crispa | 32 | 50.55 | 323 | 529 | 16.53 |
| 1977 | Crispa | 40 | 43.66 | 593 | 861 | 21.52 |
| 1978 | Crispa | 7 | 41.84 | 118 | 99 | 14.14 |
| 1979 | Crispa | | | | | |
