= PBA on BBC =

Branding used for PBA telecasts on BBC in the Philippines

- Genre: PBA game telecasts
- Starring: Various PBA on BBC commentators
- Country of origin: Philippines
- Original language: English
- No. of episodes: n/a

Production
- Camera setup: Multiple-camera setup
- Running time: 150 minutes+

Original release
- Network: Banahaw Broadcasting Corporation
- Release: April 9 – December 14, 1975

Related
- PBA on KBS

PBA on BBC is a Philippine television sports presentation show broadcast by BBC. It aired from April 9 to December 14, 1975. The consist of branding used for presentation of Philippine Basketball Association (PBA) games.

== History ==
The PBA signed a contract with Banahaw Broadcasting Corporation (BBC) to cover its 1975 season games for over a million pesos.

== Broadcasting team (1975) ==
- Dick Ildenfonso and Emy Arcilla
- Frank Sanchez, Raffy Mejia and Caloy Prieto

== See also ==
- Philippine Basketball Association
- Banahaw Broadcasting Corporation

Preceded by new spoting event	PBA TV coverage partners 1975	Succeeded by PBA on GTV
