= Crispa–Toyota rivalry =

- Teams: Crispa; Toyota
- First meeting: May 10, 1975 (PBA)
- Latest meeting: October 9, 1983 (PBA)

Statistics
- Total meetings: 123
- All-time record: 65–58 (.528), Crispa

History
PBA Finals
PBA Playoffs

The Crispa-Toyota rivalry was between the now-defunct PBA teams — the Crispa Redmanizers and the Toyota Tamaraws. The two teams dominated the PBA from 1975 to 1983, winning 21 out of the possible 26 PBA titles of those seasons.

== History ==
The rivalry was preceded by that between Crispa and the Meralco Reddy Kilowatts in the Manila Industrial Commercial Athletic Association (MICAA). After the Meralco team disbanded in 1972, most of its former players went on to form the core of a new team, the Komatsu Komets (later renamed, Toyota Comets) in 1973.

The first championship matchup between the two teams took place during the 1974 MICAA All-Filipino tournament. The Redmanizers scored a 2–0 sweep, winning the title-clinching game on October 15, 1974. They secured the victory in the final 42 seconds to win, 103–99, before a crowd of 14,000 at the Araneta Coliseum.

When the PBA was formed in 1975, the two teams dominated the league during its early years.

They faced each other in the finals of six consecutive conferences in the PBA's first two seasons in 1975–1976. Toyota had an early advantage, securing their first two championships in the league's inaugural season. After Crispa denied Toyota of a grand slam in 1975 by winning the third conference All-Philippine championship in a 3–2 series victory, the Redmanizers defeated the Comets in all three conferences the following year in 1976, thus becoming the league's first grand slam winner.

After the 1976 season, the two rivals would face each other again during finals of the 1979 season All-Filipino, with Crispa beating Toyota. The Toyota Tamaraws finally won against the Redmanizers, winning the 1979 Invitational championship.

The final championship face-off between the two teams was during the 1981 Open Conference. The Toyota Super Diesels defeated the Crispa Redmanizers, 103–97, in the fifth and final game of the best-of-five title series on July 25, 1981. The count in the finals meeting was six wins for Crispa and four for Toyota.

Their final official PBA game took place on October 9, 1983, with Crispa winning, 111–96.

In terms of cumulative PBA games played between each other (1975-1983), Crispa won 65 games as against 58 to Toyota.

In February 15, 1984, Toyota's PBA franchise was sold to Shareholdings, Inc. of the Lucio Tan group. The following year, the PBA franchise of the Crispa team was sold to Pilipinas Shell Petroleum Corporation.

== Memorable moments ==
- May 10, 1975 saw the first Crispa-Toyota game in the PBA with 11,000 fans watching at the Rizal Memorial Coliseum. The Redmanizers won, 139–133, but not without untoward incident as Toyota's Oscar Rocha punched Crispa's Bernie Fabiosa with about three seconds left in the contest. PBA commissioner Leo Prieto handed a one-month suspension and a P500 fine to Rocha while Fabiosa was fined P50 for throwing the ball at Cristino Reynoso, who was likewise asked to pay P25 for making dirty hand gestures.
- On April 17, 1977, Crispa defeated Toyota 122–121 in the opening game of the 1977 PBA season that was marred by a post-game rumble at Araneta Coliseum dugout involving players from both teams. It was reported that players from both sides were detained in Fort Bonifacio, Makati City, Philippine military headquarters, and were released the next morning. Both teams were fined by then-Commissioner Leo Prieto 5,000 pesos each while Toyota coach Dante Silverio was fined for 1,000 pesos for unsportsmanlike conduct.
- During game three of the 1980 PBA Championship series, Toyota coach Fort Acuña benched team captain Robert Jaworski against Crispa. At this point Crispa were leading by a large margin, and a win would give them the championship, and an unprecedented 20-game sweep of the tournament. During halftime, Acuña was fired by Toyota management for his refusal to put the star player in the game. Inspired by the return of their team leader, Toyota went on to win the game, but lost the series the next game. Almost a year after the incident, Acuña died from an apparent suicide.
- Toyota defeated Crispa, 3–2, in the 1981 PBA Open Conference with Andy Fields and Victor King as Toyota's imports and James Hardy with Byron "Snake" Jones playing for Crispa. The series marked the last time both teams met in a PBA championship series.

== Legacy ==
The rivalry of both teams is still remembered to this day by older basketball fans. Since the disbandment of both teams, there were a few short-lived rivalries in the PBA that followed, but not as intense as to this rivalry.

Players from both teams garnered popularity outside of the playing court. Such was evident with Robert Jaworski's senatorial victory in 1998, Ramon Fernandez's and Philip Cezar's activities within the sport, and the several movie and television show appearances of Atoy Co, Bernie Fabiosa among others.

== 2003 reunion game ==
Team	1	2	3	4	Tot.
Crispa	14	11	17	19	61
Toyota	16	18	13	18	65

A reunion game between both teams was played on May 30, 2003, at the Araneta Coliseum as part of the PBA All-Star Weekend festivities. The game was a closely contested match which saw the lead change hands many times. Toyota won the reunion game 65-61. After Adornado's three-pointer with under a minute left to cut the deficit at 62–61, Toyota teammate and former rival Fernandez passed the ball to Jaworski on the outside. Jaworski hit the three-pointer to put the game away for good, to the delight of the huge crowd. Many saw the play as a reversal of the memorable game-winner in the 1989 All-Star Game, where Fernandez scored the game winning shot from a Jaworski pass and saw both players publicly end their well-known feud.

Toyota was coached by Dante Silverio, with Jaworski also lending some of his coaching tactics, while Crispa was coached by Baby Dalupan. Terry Saldaña won the MVP of the game after posting a double-double for the Tamaraws.

On 28 May 2005, to celebrate the PBA's 30th Anniversary, the PBA held PBA's Greatest Game, a match featuring many star players from the league's long history. The game featured the Greats team coached by Robert Jaworski, and included a few former Toyota players. On the other side, coach Baby Dalupan had his Legends team, which featured several former Crispa players. The game was won by the Legends, 96–92.

In retrospect, the Crispa–Toyota rivalry helped build the popularity of the PBA and of basketball in the country.

== Statistics ==
From 1975-1983:

Type	Crispa Redmanizers	Toyota Tamaraws
Championships	13	9
All-Filipino	6	2
Reinforced Filipino	2	1
Invitational championship	0	3
Open	3	3
All-Philippine championship	2	0
Wins*	65	59
MVP awards	6	2
Rookies of the Year	1	2
Mythical 5 awards	21	17
Best Import awards	2	2
PBA 25th anniversary team members	7	4
PBA Hall of Fame inductees	6	5

*including the 2003 PBA reunion game in which Toyota won; and excluding the two 1984 non-PBA exhibition games in Guam where both teams split their two meetings

== Head-to-head meetings ==
From 1975 to 1983:

Year	Crispa	Toyota	1st Conference	2nd Conference	3rd Conference
1975	9	12	3; 5	2; 5	4; 2
1976	13	9	5; 3	5; 3	3; 3
1977	7	3	4; 0	3; 2	0; 1
1978	5	4	2; 2	3; 1	0; 1
1979	8	10	5; 4	1; 3	2; 3
1980	8	6	1; 4	1; 1	6; 1
1981	6	5	5; 4	1; 1	
1982	5	7	3; 5	1; 0	1; 2
1983	4	2	1; 1	2; 0	1; 1
Total	65	58			

Crispa
Toyota
