= Byron Jones (basketball) =

American basketball player

Personal information
- Born: High Point, North Carolina
- Listed height: 6 ft 9 in (2.06 m)
- Listed weight: 220 lb (100 kg)

Career information
- College: Selma JC (1969–1971); San Francisco (1971–1973)
- NBA draft: 1973: 5th round, 86th overall pick
- Drafted by: Boston Celtics
- Position: Forward
- Number: 33, 44

Career history
- 1973: Israel Sabras
- 1975–1976: Toyota Comets
- 1977–1978: U/Tex Wranglers
- 1980: Honda Hagibis
- 1980–1981: Crispa Redmanizers

Career highlights
- 3× PBA champion (1975 First, 1975 Second, 1978 Open)
- Stats at Basketball Reference

Byron "Snake" Jones is a retired American basketball player. Born in North Carolina, he played for the University of San Francisco. He was selected by the Boston Celtics in the 5th round (86th pick overall) of the 1973 NBA draft.

== Background ==
Nicknamed "the Snake", Jones grew up in North Carolina and played basketball at a Selma, Alabama junior college before enrolling at the University of San Francisco. He tried out for the Boston Celtics for two straight years after being chosen in the NBA draft. The Celtics sent him to Israel for experience with a pro team, the Sabras, coached by Herb Brown, who went on to become the Detroit Pistons mentor. Jones later signed up with a California semi-pro club, the San Jose Winchesters.

== PBA career ==
In 1975, Jones made his way to the Philippines playing for the Toyota Comets in the Philippine Basketball Association (PBA). Jones averaged 16.9 points in his first season with Toyota, he completed his second campaign for the Comets in 1976, averaging 19.7 points.

He went on to play for the U/Tex Wranglers (1977–1978), Honda (1980) and the Crispa Redmanizers (1980–1981). At U/Tex, Jones averaged 28.04 points per game, a big jump from his previous average with Toyota. The next season, Jones found himself a member of a PBA champion team once more, teaming up with Glenn McDonald to pace the Wranglers to their first-ever PBA title. After his Honda stint in the first conference of 1980, Jones was signed up by Crispa as Sylvester Cuyler's partner for the Invitational championship. He played 10 games with the Jeans Makers and averaged 21.40 points per game. The "Snake" would play his final PBA season with Crispa the following year.
