= Francis Arnaiz =

Filipino basketball player (born 1951)

Personal information
- Born: June 4, 1951 (age 75) Bacolod, Philippines
- Listed height: 5 ft 10 in (1.78 m)
- Listed weight: 160 lb (73 kg)

Career information
- High school: St. Clement's Academy (Iloilo City)
- College: Ateneo
- PBA draft: 1975 Elevated
- Drafted by: Toyota Super Corollas
- Playing career: 1971–1986
- Position: Point guard / shooting guard
- Number: 8

Career history
- 1971: Meralco
- 1972: U/Tex
- 1973–1984: Toyota
- 1984–1986: Ginebra San Miguel

Career highlights
- 10x PBA Champion; PBA Hall of Fame (2005); 50 Greatest Players in PBA History (2000 selection); 3× PBA Mythical First Team (1975, 1976, 1982)
Medals
Men's basketball
Representing Philippines
ABC Championship
Gold medal – first place	1973 Manila	Team

Francis C. Arnaiz (born June 4, 1951) is a Filipino former basketball player. He is best known for his career in the PBA, playing for Toyota and Ginebra San Miguel from 1975 to 1986.

== Early basketball years ==
Arnaiz had a love for sports and would shoot stuffed toys into a basket during his early childhood. While studying at La Salle-Bacolod in elementary school, he competed in both football and basketball. Football provided him with speed and exceptional footwork, skills that would later contribute to his development as an outstanding basketball player. He led his high school, St. Clement's Academy of La Paz, Iloilo City, to the PRISAA basketball championship. In college, he played for Ateneo de Manila, which won the 1969 NCAA basketball championship during his rookie year.

In 1971, he began playing in the Manila Industrial and Commercial Athletic Association (MICAA), first with the Meralco Reddy Kilowatts in 1971, the U/Tex Weavers in 1972 and the Toyota Comets in 1973.

He was a member of the Philippine men's national basketball team that won the 1973 ABC Championship and competed in the 1974 FIBA World Championship.

== PBA career ==
Arnaiz was one of the original members of the Toyota franchise that joined the newly formed Philippine Basketball Association (PBA) in 1975. Along with Robert Jaworski and Ramon Fernandez, he formed the troika of the vaunted Toyota offense. In fact, among the three players, he would have been the first to have won the Most Valuable Player (MVP) award right in the very first season of the league in 1975 when media covering the PBA named him as the Basketball Player of the Year despite the fact that Bogs Adornado was the one named PBA MVP that year. During his Toyota years, the franchise won nine PBA titles while having memorable battles against arch-rival Crispa Redmanizers, going head-to-head, on and off the court, with Crispa's Bernie Fabiosa. Arnaiz became one of the most popular players on the team not only for his playing style, but also for his mestizo looks, which gained him a following among the female fans.

He became known as "Mr clutch because he was hard to defend.

After Toyota disbanded in 1984, Arnaiz followed Jaworski in a controversial move to Gilbey's Gin (now known as Barangay Ginebra San Miguel). Reprising their old backcourt partnership in Toyota, the duo turned the Gins into a perennial contender. However, he was sidelined due to a knee injury and was placed in the injured list but, was part of the line-up, during the early part of 1986 Open Conference when Ginebra San Miguel won its first PBA title. He quietly retired from basketball shortly afterwards. He won 10 championship in his illustrious PBA career, 9 with Toyota and 1 with Ginebra San Miguel.

== Retirement ==
After his playing career, Arnaiz immigrated to the United States, resided in California. He worked for the California state government while also becoming an evangelist. Arnaiz claims in an interview that his life abroad was quite different from his life in the Philippines. He is also a visual artist, some of his paintings are set to be displayed in Dante Silverio's gallery.

Arnaiz was named as one of the PBA's Greatest Players and was inducted into the PBA Hall of Fame in 2005. In 2004, during one of Arnaiz's visits to the Philippines, he was interviewed by various media outlets recalling several memories from his playing days to his life after retirement from basketball. He was supposed to play in 2003 Crispa-Toyota Reunion Game and the 2005 PBA Greatest Game but failed to do so due to his prior commitments.

== Career highlights ==
PBA:

- 3-time Mythical First Team Selection (1975, 1976, 1982)
- 10-time PBA Champion (9-Toyota, 1-Ginebra San Miguel)
- Member, 5,000 and 10,000 points club
- Member, 2,000 assists club

Others:

- Member, 1973 Asian Basketball Confederation - Philippine team (champions)
- Member, 1974 World Basketball Championship - Philippine team, Puerto Rico
