= PBA on MBS =

Branding used for PBA telecasts on MBS in the Philippines

- Also known as: PBA on GTV
- Genre: PBA game telecasts
- Developed by: Media Specialists, Inc.
- Starring: Various PBA on GTV/MBS commentators
- Country of origin: Philippines
- Original language: English
- No. of episodes: n/a

Production
- Camera setup: Multiple-camera setup
- Running time: 150 minutes+

Original release
- Network: Government Television (later Maharlika Broadcasting System)
- Release: March 21 – December 21, 1976
- Release: April 16, 1978 – November 28, 1981

Related
- PBA on KBS; PBA on Vintage Sports; PBA on NBN/IBC

PBA on GTV (later renamed as PBA on MBS) is a Philippine television sports presentation show broadcast by GTV/MBS. It aired from March 21, 1976 to December 21, 1976. The show returned from April 16, 1978 to November 28, 1981. The consist of branding used for presentation of Philippine Basketball Association games by Media Specialists, Inc.

== Commentators/Analysts ==
=== Play by play ===
- Dick Ildefonso (1976, 1978–1981)

=== Analysts ===
- Emy Arcilla (1976, 1978–1981)
- Zal Marte (1979)
- Lauro Mumar (1980)
- Ronnie Nathanielsz (1981)

== See also ==
- Philippine Basketball Association
- List of programs broadcast by People's Television Network

Preceded by PBA on BBC	PBA TV coverage partners 1976	Succeeded by PBA on KBS
Preceded by PBA on KBS	PBA TV coverage partners 1978–1981	Succeeded by PBA on Vintage Sports
