= Toyota Super Corollas =

- Founded: 1975
- Withdrew: 1984
- History: Komatsu Komets (1973); Toyota Comets (1973-1976); Toyota Silver Tamaraws (1976); Toyota Tamaraws (1977-1980); Toyota Superdiesels (1981); Toyota Super Corollas (1981-1982, 1983); Toyota Silver Coronas (1983)
- Team colors: Komatsu Komets Toyota Comets (1973) (1973) (1974) (1975-1976); Toyota Silver Tamaraws Toyota Tamaraws (1977-1980) (1977-1979); Toyota Superdiesels (1980-1981) (1981); Toyota Super Corollas Toyota Silver Coronas
- Company: Delta Motor Corporation
- Head coach: Nilo Verona; Dante Silverio; Fortunato Acuña; Edgardo Ocampo
- Ownership: Ricardo C. Silverio Sr.
- Championships: Philippine Basketball Association (9): 1975 First Conference; 1975 Second Conference; 1977 Invitational; 1978 All-Filipino; 1978 Invitational; 1979 Invitational; 1981 Open; 1982 Reinforced Filipino; 1982 Open; 18 Finals Appearances MICAA (1): 1973
Light	Dark

The Toyota Super Corollas were a multi-titled basketball team in the Philippine Basketball Association (PBA) from 1975 to 1984. Founded in 1975 by business and sportsman Dante Silverio, the team, formally named Toyota Athletic Club, was owned by Delta Motors Corporation (defunct) and played under various names: Komatsu Komets, Toyota Comets, Toyota Silver Tamaraws, Toyota Tamaraws, Toyota Superdiesels, Toyota Super Corollas and Toyota Silver Coronas.

The team won nine PBA championships, ranking sixth in league history, behind the San Miguel Beermen (29), Barangay Ginebra San Miguel (15), Purefoods franchise (14), Alaska Aces (14), and fierce rival Crispa Redmanizers (13).

== Profile and franchise ==
The team debuted in April 1973 as the Komatsu Komets for the PANAMIN basketball tournament. In June 1973, it joined the Manila Industrial and Commercial Athletic Association (MICAA) as the Toyota Comets and emerged as champions in its maiden tournament. In January 1975, five MICAA teams met together at the Elizalde & Company canteen to sign a pre-organizational agreement for the formation of what is now known as the Philippine Basketball Association. Dante Silverio, Ricardo Silverio's nephew, was the official representative of Toyota who signed on the dotted line.

In November 1976, the team changed its name to the "Toyota Silver Tamaraws" (a tamaraw is a small buffalo). In the 1977 season, the name was shortened to the Toyota Tamaraws. That same year, the Silverio group debuted its new MICAA team, Crown Motor Sales (later playing in 1979 as Frigidaire and MAN Diesel). The MICAA team, like their PBA counterparts, were likewise successful in the MICAA and was one of three the powerhouse teams of the MICAA, along with Solid Mills and Imperial Textile Mills (ITM).

In 1978, FILMANBANK, a bank owned by the Silverio group, joined the PBA after acquiring the 7-Up Uncolas' franchise.

In 1981, the team was renamed the Toyota “Super Diesels,” and in 1982 as the “Super Corollas.” When the 1983 season unfolded, they again changed their name to the Toyota “Silver Coronas” but reverted to the Toyota Super Corollas during the 1983 Open Conference. After the 1983 season, they traded longtime starting power forward Abe King to the San Miguel in order to cut the total payroll.

However, due to corporate losses caused by the prevailing economic crisis, the team came to an end when Delta Motors Corporation sold its PBA franchise to the Lucio Tan group on February 14, 1984. The new franchise debuted in the PBA as Beer Hausen in 1984.

In February 1984, the Toyota franchise officially took a leave of absence from the league after suffering from huge losses in terms of revenues.

== Season-by-season records ==
Legend
Champion

Runner-up

Third place

Season	Conference	Team name	Overall record			Finals
Season	Conference	Team name	W	L	%	Finals
1975	First Conference	Toyota Comets	42	15	.737	Toyota 3, Crispa 1
1975	Second Conference	Toyota Comets	42	15	.737	Toyota 2, Crispa 1
1975	All-Philippine	Toyota Comets	42	15	.737	Crispa 3, Toyota 2
1976	First Conference	Toyota Comets	46	15	.754	Crispa 3, Toyota 1
1976	Second Conference	Toyota Comets	46	15	.754	Crispa 3, Toyota 1
1976	All-Philippine	Toyota Comets / Silver Tamaraws	46	15	.754	Crispa 3, Toyota 2
1977	All-Filipino Conference	Toyota Tamaraws	41	22	.651	
1977	Open Conference	Toyota Tamaraws	41	22	.651	
1977	Invitational Conference	Toyota Tamaraws	41	22	.651	Toyota 3, Emtex/Brazil 0
1978	All-Filipino Conference	Toyota Tamaraws	40	15	.727	Toyota 3, Filmanbank 1
1978	Open Conference	Toyota Tamaraws	40	15	.727	
1978	Invitational Conference	Toyota Tamaraws	40	15	.727	Toyota 3, Tanduay 1
1979	All-Filipino Conference	Toyota Tamaraws	44	18	.656	Crispa 3, Toyota 2
1979	Open Conference	Toyota Tamaraws	44	18	.656	Royal 3, Toyota 1
1979	Invitational Conference	Toyota Tamaraws	44	18	.656	Toyota 3, Crispa 1
1980	Open Conference	Toyota Tamaraws	40	21	.674	U/Tex 3, Toyota 2
1980	Invitational Conference	Toyota Tamaraws	40	21	.674	N. Stoodley/USA 2, Toyota 0
1980	All-Filipino Conference	Toyota Tamaraws	40	21	.674	Crispa 3, Toyota 1
1981	Open Conference	Toyota Super Diesels	29	14	.519	Toyota 3, Crispa 2
1981	Reinforced Filipino Conference	Toyota Super Diesels	29	14	.519	
1982	Reinforced Filipino Conference	Toyota Super Corollas	38	31	.551	Toyota 4, San Miguel 3
1982	Invitational Conference	Toyota Super Corollas	38	31	.551	
1982	Open Conference	Toyota Super Corollas	38	31	.551	Toyota 3, Gilbey's 0
1983	All-Filipino Conference	Toyota Silver Coronas	18	27	.400	
1983	Reinforced Filipino Conference	Toyota Silver Coronas	18	27	.400	
1983	Open Conference	Toyota Super Corollas	18	27	.400	
Overall record			322	184	.636	9 championships

== Awards ==
=== Individual awards ===
PBA Most Valuable Player	PBA Rookie of the Year Award	PBA Mythical First Team
Robert Jaworski - 1978; Ramon Fernandez - 1982	Gil Cortez - 1976; Arnie Tuadles - 1979	Francis Arnaiz - 1975-1976, 1982; Ramon Fernandez - 1976-1982; Robert Jaworski - 1977-1981; Arnie Tuadles - 1979; Abe King - 1982
PBA Most Improved Player	PBA Best Import	PBA Scoring Leader
	Andrew Fields - 1981 Open; Donnie Ray Koonce - 1982 Open	Ramon Fernandez - 1983, 1984

== Notable players ==
In alphabetical order. Members of PBA Hall of Fame and PBA's Greatest Players are in boldface.

- **Francis Arnaiz** - #8 (1973-1983)
- **Ramon Fernandez** - #10 (1973-1983)
- **Danilo "Danny" Florencio** - #22, #44 (1978-1982)
- **Robert Jaworski** - #7 (1973-1983)
- Fortunato Acuña - #17 (1973-1978)
- Orlando Bauzon - #9 (1973-1977)
- Nicanor "Nick" Bulaong - #20 (1977-1983)
- Aurelio "Boy" Clariño - #23 (1975-1976)
- Timoteo "Tim" Coloso - #13 (1982-1983)
- Roberto Concepcion - #5 (1973-1975)
- Edgardo Cordero - #88 (1983)
- Virgilio "Gil" Cortez - #16 (1976-1977) 1976 PBA Rookie of the Year
- Ernesto "Estoy" Estrada - #5 (1978-1979)
- Leopoldo "Pol" Herrera - #41 (1980-1983)
- Pablo Javier - #12 (1977-1980)
- Abe King, Jr. - #6 (1977-1983)
- Emerito "Emer" Legaspi - #18 (1977-1983)
- Joaquin "Chito" Loyzaga - #4 (1983)
- Rolly Marcelo - #6 (1975)
- Eduardo Merced - #9 (1980-1981)
- Ricardo "Ricky" Relosa - #15 (1982-1983)
- Alberto "Big Boy" Reynoso - #4 (1973-1976)
- Cristino "Tino" Reynoso - #14 (1973-1976)
- Oscar Rocha - #11, #45 (1977)
- Ulysses Rodriguez - #6 (1973-1975)
- Joaquin "Jake" Rojas - #22 (1975-1976)
- Quirino "Rino" Salazar - #14 (1977-1981)
- Antero "Terry" Saldana - #17 (1982-1983)
- Rodolfo "Ompong" Segura - #15 (1973-1976)
- Jess Sta. Maria - #13 (1977-1979)
- Elias Tolentino - #21 (1975)
- Arnulfo "Arnie" Tuadles - #11 (1979-1983) 1979 PBA Rookie of the Year

MICAA (1973-1974):

- Ed Camus - #13 (1973-1974)
- Nat Canson - #12 (1973-1974)
- Joseph Galonga - #18 (1973)
- Bot Acosta - #16 (1973)

=== Imports ===
- Ralph Brewster - #34 (1983)
- Stan "Sweet" Cherry - #30 (1975)
- Arnold Dugger - #30 (1982)
- Andrew Fields - #1 (1979-1983)
- John Irving - #34 (1977)
- Byron "Snake" Jones - #33 (1975-1976)
- Bruce "Sky" King - #11, #111, #43 (1977-1980)
- Victor King - #34 (1981, replacement of Melton Wertz)
- Donnie Ray Koonce - #30 (1982, replacement of Arnold Dugger)
- Kevin Porter - #2 (1983)
- TJ Robinson - #33 (1978)
- Howard Smith - #35 (1976)
- Archie Talley - #13 (1981)
- Carlos Terry - #42 (1978, replacement of TJ Robinson)
- Julius Wayne - #3 (1983, replacement of Kevin Porter)
- Melton Wertz - #33 (1981)

== Head coaches ==
- Nilo Verona - 1973
- Dante Silverio - 1974-1979
- Fortunato Acuña - 1979-1980
- Edgardo Ocampo - 1981-1983

== Team managers ==
- Dante Silverio - 1973
- Butch SyQuia - 1974-1979
- Pablo P. Carlos Jr. - 1979-1980
- Ricardo S. Silverio, Jr. - 1981-1982
- Joaquín C. Rodríguez - 1983

== See also ==
- Crispa–Toyota rivalry

Preceded by (start)	PBA teams genealogies 1975-83	Succeeded by Beer Hausen Brewmasters
