= Crispa Redmanizers =

Philippine basketball team

- Founded: 1956
- Dissolved: 1984
- History: Crispa Redmanizers (1956-1977, 1979, 1980-1984); Crispa Denims (1976); Crispa 400 (1978); Walk Tall Jeansmakers (1979-1980)
- Team colors: Forest Green, Gold, White
- Head coach: Baby Dalupan; Tommy Manotoc; Narciso Bernardo
- Ownership: P. Floro and Sons, Inc.
- Championships: Philippine Basketball Association (13): * 1975 All-Philippine * 1976 First Conference * 1976 Second Conference * 1976 All-Philippine * 1977 All-Filipino * 1977 Open * 1979 All-Filipino * 1980 All-Filipino * 1981 Reinforced * 1983 All-Filipino * 1983 Reinforced Filipino * 1983 Open * 1984 First All-Filipino
Light	Dark

The Crispa Redmanizers were a multi-titled Filipino basketball team that played in the Philippine Basketball Association (PBA) from 1975 to 1984. It was one of the nine founding teams of the PBA, winning a total of thirteen PBA championships, including two grand slams. Founded in 1956 by businessman Valeriano "Danny" Floro, the team was owned by P. Floro and Sons, Inc. (defunct).

== Profile and history ==
Named after the retail store and textile manufacturing company owned by the Floro family, the Redmanizers were managed by sportsman Danny Floro and coached for many years by the legendary Virgilio "Baby" Dalupan.

The Redmanizer moniker was a reference to the Redmanization process used in Crispa's textile manufacturing to make the cloth dimensionally stable and more resilient to unwanted shrinking after washing. Crispa's garment and textile products were marketed as "Redmanized", "shrunk-to-fit".

Crispa won 13 Philippine Basketball Association (PBA) championships over a span of nine years. The team's roster during the PBA's inaugural 1975 season included five players who would later be named the league's Most Valuable Player.

Crispa's beginnings were rooted in 1956 in the Businessman Athletic Association (BAA), a minor league. In 1958, it transferred to the now-defunct Manila Industrial and Commercial Athletic Association (MICAA). In 1971, the team composed of Reynaldo Alcantara, Rudolph Kutch, Ernesto de Leon, Rodolfo Soriano, Danilo Florencio, Johnny Revilla, Adriano Papa, Jr., William "Bogs" Adornado, Virgilio Abarrientos, Danilo Pecache, Domingo Celis, Jr. and Rey Franco lost to the Meralco Reddy Kilowatts in the MICAA championships.

In 1973, authorities discovered that six of the team's players had conspired with gamblers to drop the 1972 MICAA All-Filipino championship series against underdog Mariwasa. These six players, including four of the five starters (only Adornado was found innocent among the starting five), were served lifetime suspensions. With its lineup depleted, manager Valeriano "Danny" Floro and coach Virgilio "Baby" Dalupan were forced to rebuild. They opted to go with younger players, bringing in Mapúa Institute of Technology hotshot Fortunato "Atoy" Co, Jr. and Colegio de San Jose Recoletos standout Abet Guidaben in 1973, and Jose Rizal College’s Philip Cezar and RP Youth Team players Bernie Fabiosa and Alfredo "Freddie" Hubalde in 1974.

In 1974, Crispa began a rivalry for basketball supremacy with Toyota – a team spearheaded by Robert Jaworski, Francis Arnaiz, Abe King, and Ramon Fernandez, stars of the old Meralco franchise. Nothing came close to the Crispa-Toyota Rivalry. The two teams really hated each other and would rather lose to other teams than to each other. It was not uncommon to have games marred by bench clearing brawls. The two teams also had very different personalities with the fair haired and fair skinned Toyota players appealing more to the upper crust of Philippine society whereas the Redmanizers were perceived to be the team of the masses.

Toyota won the first two PBA conferences in 1975, beating Crispa both times. Crispa finally sneaked in and clinched the Third Conference in a battle so fierce it got marred by a free-for-all. Once the Redmanizers got a taste of the championship, however, they simply did not let go. They won all three conferences in 1976, being the first PBA team to win a "grand slam". They won another two championships in 1977, despite the loss of leading scorer and reigning MVP Adornado to a knee injury at the start of the year.

From 1978 to 1982, however, Crispa went into a title slump. They won no championships in 1978, only the All-Filipino championships in 1979 to 1981, and were blanked once again in 1982. Three conference championships in five years may be good enough for most teams, but not for the powerful Redmanizers.

The team rectified the situation by dissolving the Floro-Dalupan partnership and bringing in former U/Tex coach and president Ferdinand Marcos' son-in-law Tomas "Tommy" Manotoc to serve as coach. The team also got an infusion of young talent as amateur standouts Arturo "Bay" Cristobal, Elpidio "Yoyoy" Villamin, Padim Israel, and Mon Cruz became the newest Redmanizers. To top it all off, Crispa hired import Billy Ray Bates to augment an already awesome cast. The Redmanizers proceeded to dominate the competition, sweeping all three conference championships in 1983, another grand slam.

Crispa's 1983 grand slam campaign, however, could not prevent the inevitable break-up of the team. Arch-rival Toyota had already disbanded prior to the start of the 1984 season as the political and economic turmoil following the assassination of opposition stalwart Senator Ninoy Aquino made it increasingly difficult for companies to finance professional basketball teams. Crispa won the first conference All-Filipino title for a total of 13 franchise titles but played poorly in the remainder of 1984 campaign. On February 1, 1985, PBA Commissioner Mariano Yenko announced the sale of Crispa's PBA franchise to Pilipinas Shell. The sports pages of the day read out the sad and anticlimactic manner by which the legendary team was dismantled.

== Season-by-season records ==
Legend
Champion

Runner-up

Third place

Season	Conference	Team name	Overall record			Finals
Season	Conference	Team name	W	L	%	Finals
1975	First Conference	Crispa Redmanizers	38	19	.667	Toyota 3, Crispa 1
1975	Second Conference	Crispa Redmanizers	38	19	.667	Toyota 2, Crispa 1
1975	All-Philippine	Crispa Redmanizers	38	19	.667	Crispa 3, Toyota 2
1976	First Conference	Crispa Redmanizers	47	15	.758	Crispa 3, Toyota 1
1976	Second Conference	Crispa Redmanizers	47	15	.758	Crispa 3, Toyota 1
1976	All-Philippine	Crispa Redmanizers	47	15	.758	Crispa 3, Toyota 2
1977	All-Filipino Conference	Crispa Redmanizers	49	15	.766	Crispa 3, Mariwasa 1
1977	Open Conference	Crispa Redmanizers	49	15	.766	Crispa 3, U/Tex 2
1977	Invitational Conference	Crispa Redmanizers	49	15	.766	
1978	All-Filipino Conference	Crispa Redmanizers	35	19	.648	
1978	Open Conference	Crispa Redmanizers	35	19	.648	U/Tex 3, Crispa 0
1978	Invitational Conference	Crispa Redmanizers	35	19	.648	
1979	All-Filipino Conference	Crispa Redmanizers	42	20	.667	Crispa 3, Toyota 2
1979	Open Conference	Walk Tall Jeans	42	20	.667	
1979	Invitational Conference	Crispa Redmanziers	42	20	.667	Toyota 3, Crispa 1
1980	Open Conference	Crispa Redmanziers	44	15	.746	
1980	Invitational Conference	Crispa Redmanziers	44	15	.746	
1980	All-Filipino Conference	Crispa Redmanziers	44	15	.746	Crispa 3, Toyota 1
1981	Open Conference	Crispa Redmanziers	28	24	.519	Toyota 3, Crispa 2
1981	Reinforced Filipino Conference	Crispa Redmanziers	28	24	.519	Crispa 3, U/Tex 1
1982	Reinforced Filipino Conference	Crispa Redmanziers	28	26	.519	
1982	Invitational Conference	Crispa Redmanziers	28	26	.519	San Miguel 2, Crispa 1
1982	Open Conference	Crispa Redmanziers	28	26	.519	
1983	All-Filipino Conference	Crispa Redmanziers	46	16	.741	Crispa 3, Gilbey's 0
1983	Reinforced Filipino Conference	Crispa Redmanziers	46	16	.741	Crispa 3, Great Taste 2
1983	Open Conference	Crispa Redmanziers	46	16	.741	Crispa 3, Great Taste 0
1984	First All-Filipino Conference	Crispa Redmanziers	38	23	.623	Crispa 4, Gilbey's 1
1984	Second All-Filipino Conference	Crispa Redmanziers	38	23	.623	
1984	Invitational Conference	Crispa Redmanziers	38	23	.623	Great Taste 3, Crispa 2
Overall record			395	192	.673	13 championships

== Awards ==
=== Individual awards ===
PBA Most Valuable Player	PBA Rookie of the Year Award	PBA Mythical First Team
Bogs Adornado - 1975-1976; Freddie Hubalde - 1977; Atoy Co - 1979; Philip Cezar - 1980; Abet Guidaben - 1983	Willie Pearson - 1984	Bogs Adornado - 1975-1976; Atoy Co - 1975-1977, 1979-1984; Philip Cezar - 1976, 1978-1981, 1983; Freddie Hubalde - 1977-1978; Abet Guidaben - 1983-1984
PBA Mythical Second Team	PBA Best Import	PBA Scoring Leader
Philip Cezar - 1984; Bernie Fabiosa - 1984; Willie Pearson - 1984	Billy Ray Bates - 1983 Reinforced Filipino, 1983 Open	Atoy Co - 1979

== Notable players ==
In alphabetical order. Members of PBA Hall of Fame and PBA Greatest Players are in boldface.

- **Fortunato "Atoy" Co, Jr.** - #5, #6 (1972-1984)
- **William "Bogs" Adornado** - #11 (1970-1979)
- **Philip Cezar** - #18 (1973-1984)
- **Abet Guidaben** - #14, #5 (1973-1984)
- **Freddie Hubalde** - #10 (1974-1984)
- **Bernie Fabiosa** - #21, #15 (1974-1984)
- Alex Azurin (1975)
- Cris Calilan - #23 (1974-1976)
- Jose Bernardo "Joy" Carpio - #29 (1981-1984)
- David Cezar - #16 (1974-1976)
- Arturo "Bay" Cristobal - #8, #7 (1981-1984)
- Ramon "Mon" Cruz - #14, #4 (1981-1984)
- Virgilio "Bong" dela Cruz - #12 (1974-1981)
- Gregorio "Joy" Dionisio - #9 (1976-1981)
- Rudy Distrito - #19 (1981-1984)
- Rod Co - #16 (1983-1984)
- Eduardo "Ed" Espinosa - #34 (1979)
- Reynaldo "Rey" Franco - #19 (1971-1977)
- Matthew "Fritz" Gaston - #14 (1983-1984)
- Filomeno "Fil" Gulfin - #24 (1979)
- Joel Gomez- #22(1975)
- Cesar Ijares - #9 (1974-1975)
- Federico "Padim" Israel - #9 (1981-1984)
- Jaime "Jimmy" Javier - #8, #25 (1978-1979, 1984)
- Eric Leaño - #17, #8 (1973-1975)
- Lim Eng Beng - #17 (1984)
- Romulo Mamaril - #17 (1980-1983)
- Frank Natividad - #16 (1981)
- Reynaldo Pages - #8 (1973-1978)
- William "Willie" Pearson - #11 (1984)
- Johnny Revilla - #9, #23, #16 (1970-1975)
- Jesus Santa Maria - #17 (1975)
- Rodolfo "Rudy" Soriano - #7 (1970-1977)
- Wilfredo "Willy" Tanduyan - #19 (1978)
- Armando Torres - #17 (1977-1978)
- Reynaldo "Rey" Vallejo - #12, #4 (1974-1975)
- Luis "Tito" Varela - #9, #14, #33 (1976-1981, 1983–1984)
- Elpidio "Yoyoy" Villamin - #12, #13 (1981-1984)

BAA/MBA (1956-1957):

- Carlos Badion
- Gerry Cruz
- Charlie Dudds
- Andy de Jesus
- Dominador Lauron
- Mike Littaua
- Jaime Lucas - #11, #7
- Alberto Nicdao
- Eddie Pacheco
- Eddie Rivera
- Willie Sotelo
- Mario Uson

MICAA (1958-1974):

- Virgilio "Billy" Abarrientos - #14 (1969-1973)
- Luis Afable (1973)
- Reynaldo "Epoy" Alcantara - #4 (1969-1973)
- Guillermo Baz
- Narciso Bernardo (1970)
- Dave Brodett - #10 (1974)
- Edgardo "Ed" Carvajal - #14 (1973-1974)
- Domingo "Jun" Celis, Jr. - #17 (1970)
- Aniceto Chambers
- Romy Diaz - #7
- Cesar Dignos
- Danny Florencio - #8 (1970-1973)
- Robert Flores
- Priscilo Gabuya
- Francisco Henares
- Robert Jaworski (1965)
- Manuel Jocson (1969-1970)
- Rudolf Kutch - #13, #5 (1969-1973)
- Ernesto "Ernie" de Leon - #6 (1970-1973)
- Roehl Nadurata - #13
- Abelardo Ortiz
- Constancio Ortiz - #10
- Adriano "Jun" Papa, Jr. - #10 (1969-1973)
- Bienvenido Papa
- Tomas Paredes
- Herschel Raquel - #15 (1973-1974)
- Leonardo del Pilar
- Dominador Servillano
- Reynaldo Sigua - #22 (1971)
- Pelagio Simon
- Mike Taquintic
- Mariano Tolentino
- James Yap
- Roberto Yburan

=== Imports ===
- Herman Barnes (1984)
- Billy Ray Bates "The Black Superman" - #2 (1983)
- Lawrence Boston - #43 (1980)
- Lewis Brown - #11 (1982)
- Bill Bunton - #33 (1976)
- Johnny Burkes - #24 (1975)
- Irving Chatmann - #55 (1979)
- Pete Crotty - #25 (1975)
- Sylvester Cuyler - #11 (1980)
- Larry Demic - #25 (1983)
- Mike Gibson (1982)
- Al Green - #12 (1981)
- Glenn Hagan - #12 (1982)
- James Hardy - #11 (1981)
- Bernard Harris - #42 (1979)
- Ricky Hicks (1977)
- Byron "Snake" Jones - #33 (1980-1981)
- Clarence Kea - #3 (1982)
- Cyrus Mann - #25, #27 (1976-1977, 1979)
- Cris McMurray (1977)
- Paul Mills - #32 (1978)
- Glenn Mosley (1980)
- DeWayne Scales - #35 (1983)
- Mike Schultz (1982)
- Ansley Truitt - #43 (1978)
- Cornell Warner - #42 (1979)
- Carlton Willis - #22 (1984)
- James Wright (1982)

MICAA:

- Frank Bucher (1969)
- Larry Bunce (1971; Crispa's tallest import at 7'1")
- Harold Bunton (1969)
- Tom Cowart - #18 (1971)
- Gary Cunningham
- Tine Hardeman
- Bill Jankans (1971)
- Bill Leedom (1969)
- Paul Scranton - #16 (1971)

== Head coaches ==
- Cesar Baldueza (1956)
- Crispin Aldiosa (1956-1957)
- Valerio "Amang" López (1958-1959)
- Francisco Calilan (1960-1961)
- Virgilio "Baby" Dalupan (1962-1982)
- Tommy Manotoc (1983-1984)
- Narciso Bernardo (1984)

== Team managers ==
- Valeriano "Danny" L. Floro
- Ernesto "Ting" L. Floro (1983)

== See also ==
- Crispa 400
- Crispa–Toyota rivalry
- Crispa (clothing brand)

Preceded by (start)	PBA teams genealogies 1975-84	Succeeded by Shell Azodrin Bugbusters
