= 1975 Mariwasa-Noritake Porcelainmakers season =

- Head coach: Felicisimo Fajardo Emerson Coseteng
- Owner(s): Mariwasa Group

First Conference results
- Record: 8–8 (50%)
- Place: 5th
- Playoff finish: DNQ

Second Conference results
- Record: 13–9 (59.1%)
- Place: 5th
- Playoff finish: DNQ

All-Philippine Championship results
- Record: 0–2 (0%)
- Place: 8th
- Playoff finish: DNQ

Mariwasa-Noritake Porcelainmakers seasons

The 1975 Mariwasa-Noritake Porcelainmakers season was the 1st season of the franchise in the Philippine Basketball Association (PBA).

== Colors ==
Noritake
(dark)
(light)

== First Conference standings ==
#	Teams	W	L	PCT	GB
1	Toyota Comets	13	3	.812	–-
2	Crispa Redmanizers	12	4	.750	1
3	U-Tex Weavers	10	6	.625	3
4	Royal Tru-Orange	10	6	.625	3
5	Mariwasa-Noritake	8	8	.500	5
6	Concepcion Carrier	7	9	.438	6
7	Tanduay Distillers	5	11	.312	8
8	Presto Ice Cream Flavorites	5	11	.312	8
9	Seven-Up	2	14	.125	11

== Notable dates ==
- April 9: The PBA opens with its inaugural double-header at the Araneta Coliseum, with a sellout crowd of 18,000 watching, the Noritake Porcelainmakers defeated the Carrier Weathermakers, 101-98.

== Summary ==
The Porcelainmakers were a steady and average team, hovering around a .500 record for almost each conference in the season. In the First Conference, Noritake almost made the playoffs with a record of 8-8 (.500), two games shy behind the Royal Tru-Orange. The team was led by all-star Rey Alcantara and imports Cisco Oliver and Billy Robinson.

In the Second Conference, they their best record of the season going 13-9 (.591), but still missed the playoffs, they finished as the 5th seed also again behind the Royal Tru-Orange.

In the All-Philippine Championship Conference, Noritake lose their last 2 games of the season and again missed the playoffs.

== Roster ==
Roster	#	Position	Height
Rey Alcantara	4	Guard	6 ft 2 in (1.88 m)
Gavino Amomonpon		Forward	6 ft 0 in (1.83 m)
Mark Arriola	16	Guard	5 ft 8 in (1.73 m)
Lucrecio Dacula	21	Guard	5 ft 11 in (1.80 m)
Mariano Figuracion	11	Forward	6 ft 2 in (1.88 m)
Hubert Filipinas	8	Forward	6 ft 2 in (1.88 m)
Roberto Legaspi	15	Center	6 ft 2 in (1.88 m)
Albert Manalo	7/42	Guard	6 ft 2 in (1.88 m)
Van Samson Nery	17	Forward	5 ft 10 in (1.78 m)
Cisco Oliver ^{Import}	23	Forward-Center	6 ft 6 in (1.98 m)
Adriano Papa	10	Forward	5 ft 11 in (1.80 m)
Ulysses Rodriguez	6	Forward	6 ft 0 in (1.83 m)
Jesse Sullano	14	Guard	5 ft 9 in (1.75 m)
Edmundo Tierra	18	Forward-Center	6 ft 1 in (1.85 m)
Billy Robinson ^{Import}	13	Center	6 ft 7 in (2.01 m)
James Cornelious ^{Import}	27	Forward-Center	6 ft 5 in (1.96 m)

Sources:

- Edmon1974's Blog: 1975 Philippine Basketball Association (PBA) Team Rosters

== See also ==
- 1975 PBA season
