= 1975 Carrier Weathermakers season =

- Head coach: Valentin Eduque
- Owner(s): Concepcion Industries, Inc.

First Conference results
- Record: 7–9 (43.8%)
- Place: 6th
- Playoff finish: N/A

Second Conference results
- Record: 6–15 (28.6%)
- Place: 6th
- Playoff finish: N/A

All-Philippine Championship results
- Record: 0–1 (0%)
- Place: 9th
- Playoff finish: N/A

Carrier Weathermakers seasons

The 1975 Carrier Weathermakers season was the 1st season of the franchise in the Philippine Basketball Association (PBA).

== Colors ==
Carrier Weathermakers
(dark)
(light)

== First Conference standings ==
#	Teams	W	L	PCT	GB
1	Toyota Tamaraws	13	3	.812	–-
2	Crispa Redmanizers	12	4	.750	1
3	U-Tex Weavers	10	6	.625	3
4	Royal Tru-Orange	10	6	.625	3
5	Mariwasa-Noritake	8	8	.500	5
6	Concepcion Carrier	7	9	.438	6
7	Tanduay Distillery	5	11	.312	8
8	CFC-Presto	5	11	.312	8
9	Seven-Up	2	14	.125	11

== Summary ==
On April 9, the Weathermakers faced the Noritake Porcelainmakers in the inaugural double-header of the PBA at the Araneta Coliseum with a sellout crowd of 18,000 watching, the Carrier Weathermakers lost the game with a score of 101–98. Gregorio "Joy" Dionisio scored the very first basket in PBA history.

The Weathermakers struggled throughout the First Conference hovering around a .500 record, they missed the playoffs entirely and finished as the 5th seed. In the Second Conference, they struggled even more and finished with a disappointing 6–15 record and missed the playoffs again.

Lim Eng Beng, Gregorio Dionisio, and Ramon Lucindo were all selected to participate in the PBA Ovaltine dream games.

== Roster ==
Roster	#	Position	Height
Romualdo Cabading	12	Center-Forward	6 ft 2 in (1.88 m)
Roy Deles	5	Forward	6 ft 0 in (1.83 m)
Gregorio Dionisio	10	Guard	5 ft 9 in (1.75 m)
Jesus Dungo	7	Guard-Forward	5 ft 9 in (1.75 m)
Felix Flores	9	Guard-Center	6 ft 0 in (1.83 m)
Francisco Henares	13	Guard	6 ft 3 in (1.91 m)
Lim Eng Beng	24/14	Guard	5 ft 11 in (1.80 m)
Ramon Lucindo	16	Forward	6 ft 3 in (1.91 m)
Jimmy Mariano	6	Forward	6 ft 4 in (1.93 m)
Alfonso Mora	11	Forward	6 ft 0 in (1.83 m)
Jaime Noblezada	8	Forward	6 ft 2 in (1.88 m)
Roberto Salonga	4	Guard	5 ft 11 in (1.80 m)
Nate Stephens ^{Import}	52	Center	6 ft 11 in (2.11 m)
Remel Diggs ^{Import}	44	Center-Forward	6 ft 8 in (2.03 m)

Sources:

- Edmon1974's Blog: 1975 Philippine Basketball Association (PBA) Team Rosters

== See also ==
- 1975 PBA season
