= List of Philippine Basketball Association career minutes played leaders =

This is a list of Philippine Basketball Association players by total career minutes played.

Statistics accurate as of January 16, 2023.

Italics^	Active PBA player
*	Named as one of the “40 Greatest Players in PBA History”

Rank	Player	Position(s)	Years played	Team(s) played	Games played	Minutes played	Minutes per game average
1	Ramon Fernandez*	C/PF	1975–1994	Toyota, Manila Beer, Tanduay, Purefoods, San Miguel	1,074	36,624	34.1
2	Alvin Patrimonio*	PF/SF	1988–2005	Purefoods	857	30,478	35.6
3	Jerry Codiñera*	C	1988–2005	Purefoods, Mobiline, FedEx	871	29,664	34.1
4	Abet Guidaben*	C/PF	1975–1996	Crispa, Manila Beer, San Miguel, Tanduay, Purefoods, Alaska, Pepsi, Shell	1,081	29,577	27.4
5	Robert Jaworski*	PG	1975–1998	Toyota, Ginebra	958	28,915	30.2
6	Philip Cezar*	PF/C	1975–1990	Crispa, Shell, Great Taste, Ginebra	918	28,127	30.6
7	Jojo Lastimosa*	SG	1988–2002	Purefoods, Alaska, Pop Cola	789	25,085	31.8
8	Olsen Racela	PG	1993–2011	Purefoods, San Miguel	925	24,972	27.0
9	Johnny Abarrientos*	PG	1993–2010	Alaska, Pop Cola/Coca-Cola, Barangay Ginebra	742	24,453	33.0
10	Atoy Co*	SG	1975–1988	Crispa, Great Taste	749	24,395	32.6
11	LA Tenorio^	PG	2006–present	San Miguel/Magnolia, Alaska, Barangay Ginebra	738	24,283	32.9
12	Arwind Santos*^	PF/SF	2006–present	Air21, San Miguel/Petron, NorthPort	730	23,639	32.4
13	Yoyoy Villamin	PF	1981–1998	Crispa, Manila Beer, Alaska, Swift/Sunkist, Mobiline, San Miguel	871	22,675	26.0
14	Nelson Asaytono	PF/SF	1989–2005	Purefoods, Swift/Sunkist/Pop Cola, San Miguel, Red Bull	820	22,584	27.5
15	James Yap*^	SG/SF	2004–present	Purefoods/B-Meg Derby Ace/B-Meg/San Mig Coffee/San Mig Super Coffee/Star, Rain or Shine	734	22,496	30.6
16	Alex Cabagnot^	PG	2005–present	Sta. Lucia, Coca-Cola, Burger King, San Miguel/Petron, GlobalPort, Terrafirma	689	21,865	31.7
17	Dennis Espino	C/PF	1995–2011	Sta. Lucia, Coca-Cola/Powerade	669	21,507	32.2
18	Jeffrey Cariaso	SG	1995–2010	Alaska, Mobiline, Tanduay, Coca-Cola	686	21,477	31.3
19	Benjie Paras*	C/PF	1989–2003	Shell, San Miguel	586	21,444	36.6
20	Abe King	PF/C	1977–1994	Toyota, Gold Eagle, Great Taste, Purefoods	782	21,433	27.4

== See also ==
- List of Philippine Basketball Association players
