= List of Philippine Basketball Association career blocks leaders =

This is a list of Philippine Basketball Association players by total career blocks.

Statistics accurate as of December 22, 2022.

Italics^	Active PBA player
*	Named as one of the "40 Greatest Players in PBA History”
^{~}	Played as import

Rank	Player	Position(s)	Years played	Team(s) played	Games played	Total blocks	Blocks per game average
1	Ramon Fernandez*	C/PF	1975–1994	Toyota, Manila Beer, Tanduay, Purefoods, San Miguel	1,074	1,853	1.7
2	Philip Cezar*	PF/C	1975–1990	Crispa, Shell, Great Taste, Ginebra	918	1,370	1.5
3	Benjie Paras*	C/PF	1989–2003	Shell, San Miguel	586	1,333	2.3
4	Jerry Codiñera*	C	1988–2005	Purefoods, Mobiline, FedEx	871	1,221	1.4
5	Marlou Aquino*	C	1996–2010	Ginebra/Gordon's Gin, Sta. Lucia, Meralco	648	1,131	1.8
6	Arwind Santos*^	PF/SF	2006–present	Air21, San Miguel/Petron, NorthPort	730	938	1.3
7	Abet Guidaben*	C/PF	1975–1996	Crispa, Manila Beer, San Miguel, Tanduay, Purefoods, Alaska, Pepsi, Shell	1,081	922	0.9
8	Manny Victorino	C	1981–1996	Great Taste/Presto, Shell, Pepsi/7-Up, Ginebra, Purefoods, Sunkist	727	817	1.1
9	Ali Peek	C/PF	1998–2014	Pop Cola, Alaska, Coca-Cola, Sta. Lucia, Talk 'N Text	649	784	1.2
10	Japeth Aguilar^	C/PF	2009–present	Burger King, Talk 'N Text, GlobalPort, Barangay Ginebra	441	711	1.6
11	Yoyoy Villamin	PF	1981–1998	Crispa, Manila Beer, Alaska, Swift/Sunkist, Mobiline, San Miguel	871	709	0.8
12	Billy Robinson^{~}	C	1975–1979	U/Tex, FilmanBank, Mariwasa	NA	627	NA
13	Poch Juinio	C/PF	1994–2007	Alaska, Coca-Cola, Talk 'N Text	721	582	0.8
14	Abe King	PF/C	1977–1994	Toyota, Gold Eagle, Great Taste, Purefoods	782	580	0.7
15	Alvin Patrimonio*	PF/SF	1988–2005	Purefoods/Coney Island	857	576	0.7
16	Ricky Relosa	PF	1982–1993	Toyota, Beer Hausen, Ginebra, Alaska, Pepsi, Shell	566	574	1.0
17	Romulo Mamaril	C	1975–1991	Crispa, Manhattan, Tanduay, Añejo Rhum, Shell	NA	565	NA
18	Bobby Parks^{~}	SF/PF	1987–1998	San Miguel, Shell	NA	563	NA
19	Andrew Fields^{~}	SF/PF	1979–1983	Toyota	NA	554	NA
20	Norman Black^{~}	SF/PF	1981–1990	Tefilin, San Miguel/Magnolia, Great Taste, Alaska	NA	530	NA

== See also ==
- List of Philippine Basketball Association players
