= List of Philippine Basketball Association career free throw scoring leaders =

This is a list of Philippine Basketball Association players by total career free throws made.

Statistics accurate as of December 22, 2022.

Italics^	Active PBA player
*	Named as one of the “40 Greatest Players in PBA History”
^{~}	Played as import

Rank	Player	Position(s)	Years played	Team(s) played	Games played	Total free throws made	Total free throws attempted	Free throw percentage
1	Ramon Fernandez*	C/PF	1975–1994	Toyota, Manila Beer, Tanduay, Purefoods, San Miguel	1,074	3,848	NA	NA
2	Alvin Patrimonio*	PF/SF	1988–2005	Purefoods	857	3,640	4,244	0.858
3	Jojo Lastimosa*	SG	1988–2002	Purefoods, Alaska, Pop Cola	789	3,133	NA	NA
4	Nelson Asaytono	PF/SF	1989–2005	Purefoods, Swift/Sunkist/Pop Cola, San Miguel, Red Bull	820	2,999	3,227	0.794
5	Abet Guidaben*	C/PF	1975–1996	Crispa, Manila Beer, San Miguel, Tanduay, Purefoods, Alaska, Pepsi, Shell	1,081	2,875	NA	NA
6	Bobby Parks^{~}	SF/PF	1987–1998	San Miguel, Shell	NA	2,352	NA	NA
7	Asi Taulava*^	C	1999–present	Mobiline/Talk 'N Text, Coca-Cola, Meralco, Air21, NLEX	624	2,224	3,859	0.576
8	Bogs Adornado*	SF	1975–1987	Crispa, U/Tex, Great Taste, Shell, Hills Bros.	586	2,169	NA	NA
9	Danny Seigle	PF/SF	1999–2017	San Miguel/Magnolia, Air21/Barako Bull, Talk 'N Text/TNT	558	2,096	2,739	0.765
10	Jerry Codiñera*	C	1988–2005	Purefoods, Mobiline, FedEx	871	2,093	2,826	0.741
11	Philip Cezar*	PF/C	1975–1990	Crispa, Shell, Great Taste, Ginebra	918	2,066	NA	NA
12	Robert Jaworski*	PG	1975–1998	Toyota, Ginebra	958	2,057	NA	NA
13	Jun Limpot	PF/C	1979–2007	Sta. Lucia, Barangay Ginebra, Alaska, Purefoods	558	2,048	2,516	0.814
14	Ato Agustin*	PG/SG	1989–2001	San Miguel, Pop Cola, Sta. Lucia, Red Bull	569	2,043	NA	NA
15	Dennis Espino	C/PF	1995–2011	Sta. Lucia, Coca-Cola/Powerade	669	2,001	2,753	0.727
16	James Yap*^	SG/SF	2004–present	Purefoods/B-Meg/San Mig Coffee/San Mig Super Coffee/Star, Rain or Shine	734	1,970	2,742	0.718
17	Jeffrey Cariaso	SG	1995–2010	Alaska, Mobiline, Tanduay, Coca-Cola	686	1,952	2,433	0.802
18	Manny Victorino	C	1981–1996	Great Taste/Presto, Shell, Pepsi/7-Up, Ginebra, Purefoods, Sunkist	727	1,905	NA	NA
19	Allan Caidic*	SG	1987–1999	Great Taste, San Miguel, Barangay Ginebra	598	1,835	NA	NA
20	Freddie Hubalde*	SG/SF	1975–1989	Crispa, Tanduay, Purefoods, Shell	793	1,794	NA	NA

== See also ==
- List of Philippine Basketball Association players
