= List of Philippine Basketball Association career steals leaders =

This is a list of Philippine Basketball Association players by total career steals.

Statistics accurate as of January 16, 2023.

Italics^	Active PBA player
*	Named as one of the “40 Greatest Players in PBA History”

Rank	Player	Position(s)	Years played	Team(s) played	Games played	Total steals	Steals per game average
1	Johnny Abarrientos*	PG	1993–2010	Alaska, Pop Cola/Coca-Cola, Ginebra	742	1,358	1.8
2	Ramon Fernandez*	C/PF	1975–1994	Toyota, Manila Beer, Tanduay, Purefoods, San Miguel	1,074	1,302	1.2
3	Bernie Fabiosa*	PG	1975–1991	Crispa, Shell, Great Taste, Purefoods, Pop Cola	788	1,235	1.6
4	Chris Ross^	PG	2009–present	Coca-Cola, Sta. Lucia, Meralco, San Miguel/Petron	528	978	1.9
5	Robert Jaworski*	PG	1975–1998	Toyota, Ginebra	958	937	1.0
6	Dindo Pumaren	PG	1989–2000	Purefoods, Pepsi	692	902	1.3
7	LA Tenorio^	PG	2006–present	San Miguel/Magnolia, Alaska, Barangay Ginebra	738	883	1.2
8	Alex Cabagnot^	PG	2005–present	Sta. Lucia, Coca-Cola, Burger King, San Miguel/Petron, GlobalPort, Terrafirma	689	759	1.1
9	Yoyong Martirez	PG	1979–1984	San Miguel, Country Fair	NA	753	NA
10	Olsen Racela	PG	1993–2011	Purefoods, San Miguel/Magnolia/Petron	925	751	0.8
11	Ryan Reyes^	SG	2007–present	Sta. Lucia, Talk 'N Text/TNT	589	741	1.3
12	Wynne Arboleda	PG	2000–2016	Pop Cola, Tanduay, FedEx/Air21/Barako Bull, NLEX	526	711	1.4
13	Cyrus Baguio	SG	2003–2019	Red Bull, Barangay Ginebra, Burger King, Alaska, Phoenix, NLEX	741	685	0.9
14	Willie Generalao	PG	1980–1991	Gilbey’s Gin, Tanduay, Purefoods, Pepsi	550	639	1.2
15	Mike Cortez	PG	2003–2019	Alaska, San Miguel, Barangay Ginebra, Meralco, Blackwater, GlobalPort	620	602	0.9
16	Philip Cezar*	PF/C	1975–1990	Crispa, Shell, Great Taste, Ginebra	918	599	0.7
17	Ronnie Magsanoc*	PG	1989–2002	Shell, Sta. Lucia, Purefoods	618	571	0.9
18	Jojo Lastimosa*	SG	1988–2002	Purefoods, Alaska, Pop Cola	789	556	0.7
19	Willie Miller*	SG/PG	2003–2015	Red Bull, Talk 'N Text, Alaska, Ginebra, Barako Bull, GlobalPort	643	550	0.9
20	Roger Yap	PG	2001–2013	Purefoods/B-Meg, FedEx/Barako Bull, Shell	489	548	1.1
21	Chito Loyzaga	PF/SF	1981–1993	YCO-Tanduay, Toyota, Great Taste, Ginebra	566	538	1.0

== See also ==
- List of Philippine Basketball Association players
