= List of Philippine Basketball Association career free throw percentage leaders =

This is a list of Philippine Basketball Association players by the highest free throw percentage in their PBA career.

Statistics accurate as of December 23, 2022.

Italics^	Active PBA player
*	Named as one of the “40 Greatest Players in PBA History”
^{~}	Played as import

Rank	Player	Position(s)	Years played	Team(s) played	Games played	Total free throws made	Total free throws attempted	Free throw percentage	Reference
1	Tony Harris	SG	1992–1998	Swift Mighty Meaties, Sunkist Orange Juicers, Pop Cola 800s	59	904	1,030	87.8	
2	Ricardo Brown*	PG	1983–1990	Great Taste Coffee Makers, San Miguel Beermen	340	1,436	1,639	87.6	
3	Allan Caidic*	SG	1987–1999	Great Taste Coffee Makers, San Miguel Beermen, Ginebra San Miguel	598	1,835	2,108	87.1	
4	Garvo Lanete	SG	2016–2021	NLEX Road Warriors, Meralco Bolts, NorthPort Batang Pier	163	136	157	86.7	
5	Renato Agustin	PG/SG	1989–2001	San Miguel Beermen, Pop Cola Panthers, Mobiline Phone Pals, Sta. Lucia Realtors, Batang Red Bull Thunder	569	2,043	2,364	86.4	
6	Ronnie Magsanoc*	PG	1989–2002	Shell Turbo Chargers, Sta. Lucia Realtors, Purefoods Tender Juicy Hotdogs	618	1,381	1,603	86.2	
7	Alvin Patrimonio*	PF	1988–2004	Purefoods Hotshots	857	3,640	4,244	85.8	
8	Johnny Abarrientos*	PG	1993–2007, 2010	Alaska Milkmen, Pop Cola Panthers, Coca-Cola Tigers, Ginebra San Miguel	742	1,594	1,875	85.1	
9	Paul Lee	SG/PG	2011–Present	Rain or Shine Elasto Painters, Magnolia Hotshots	474	1,471	1,743	84.4	
10	Olsen Racela	PG	1993–2011	Purefoods Tender Juicy Hotdogs, San Miguel Beermen	925	1,444	1,716	84.2	
11	Jojo Lastimosa*	SG	1988–2002	Purefoods Hotdogs, Alaska Milkmen, Pop Cola Panthers, Alaska Aces	789	3,133	3,763	83.3	
12	Bobby Parks*	PG/SG	1988–1993, 1997–1999	San Miguel Beermen, Shell Turbo Chargers	221	2,352	2,826	83.2	
13	Renren Ritualo	SG	2002–2014	Air 21 Express, TNT Text Phone Pals, Powerade Tigers, Meralco Bolts	429	605	730	82.9	
14	Lamont Strothers	SG	1997–2002	San Miguel Beermen	119	882	1,068	82.6	

== See also ==
- List of Philippine Basketball Association players
