= List of Philippine Basketball Association career games played leaders =

This is a list of Philippine Basketball Association players by total career games played.

Statistics accurate as of March 22, 2023.

Italics^	Active PBA player
*	Named as one of the “40 Greatest Players in PBA History”

Rank	Player	Position(s)	Years played	Team(s) played	Games played
1	Abet Guidaben*	C/PF	1975–1996	Crispa, Manila Beer, San Miguel, Tanduay, Purefoods, Alaska, Pepsi/7–Up, Shell	1,081
2	Ramon Fernandez*	C/PF	1975–1994	Toyota, Manila Beer, Tanduay, Purefoods, San Miguel	1,074
3	Robert Jaworski*	PG	1975–1998	Toyota, Ginebra/Añejo Rum/Tondeña 65	958
4	Olsen Racela	PG	1993–2011	Coney Island/Purefoods, San Miguel	925
5	Philip Cezar*	PF/C	1975–1990	Crispa, Shell, Great Taste/Presto, Ginebra/Añejo Rum	918
6	Yoyoy Villamin	PF	1981–1998	Crispa, Manila Beer, Hills Bros./Alaska, Swift/Sunkist, Pepsi/Mobiline, San Miguel	871
7	Jerry Codiñera*	C/PF	1988–2005	Purefoods/Coney Island, Mobiline/Talk 'N Text, FedEx	871
8	Alvin Patrimonio*	PF/SF	1988–2005	Purefoods/Coney Island	857
9	Rafi Reavis^	C/PF	2002–present	Coca-Cola, Barangay Ginebra, Purefoods/B-Meg Derby Ace/B-Meg/San Mig Coffee/San Mig Super Coffee/Star/Magnolia	842
10	Nelson Asaytono	PF/SF	1989–2005	Purefoods, Swift/Sunkist/Pop Cola, San Miguel, Red Bull	820
11	Freddie Hubalde*	SF/SG	1975–1990	Crispa, Tanduay, Purefoods, Shell, Añejo Rum	793
12	Jojo Lastimosa*	SG	1988–2002	Purefoods, Alaska, Pop Cola	789
13	Bernie Fabiosa*	PG	1975–1991	Crispa, Shell, Great Taste, Purefoods, Pop Cola	788
14	Abe King	PF/C	1977–1994	Toyota, Gold Eagle, Great Taste, Purefoods	782
15	Terry Saldaña	PF	1982–1998	Toyota, Gilbey’s Gin/Ginebra/Gordon’s Gin, Pop Cola/Swift, Shell	766
16	Atoy Co*	SG	1975–1988	Crispa, Great Taste	749
17	Biboy Ravanes	SG/SF	1979– 1991	Royal Tru-Orange/San Miguel, Shell, Alaska	745
18	Mark Caguioa*	SG	2001–2020	Barangay Ginebra	744
19	Johnny Abarrientos*	PG	1993–2010	Alaska, Pop Cola/Coca-Cola, Barangay Ginebra	742
20	Cyrus Baguio	SG	2003–2019	Red Bull, Burger King, Barangay Ginebra, Alaska, Phoenix, NLEX	741

== See also ==
- List of Philippine Basketball Association players
