= List of nicknames used in Philippine basketball =

This is a list of nicknames in the sport of basketball in the Philippines. Most are related to professional basketball leagues such as the Philippine Basketball Association, Metropolitan Basketball Association and others, although a few notable nicknames from the University Athletic Association of the Philippines and National Collegiate Athletic Association (Philippines) are included.

== Players ==
=== A ===
- Aaron Aban - "Triple A"
- Billy Abarrientos - "Haba-Haba"
- Johnny Abarrientos - "The Flying A"
- Dylan Ababou - "Super Ababou"
- Freddie Abuda - "The Scavenger"
- Calvin Abueva - "The Beast"
- Rommel Adducul - "The General"
- William "Bogs" Adornado - "Mr. Nice Guy"
- Japeth Aguilar - "Jumping Japeth", "The Eagle"
- Ato Agustin - "The Atom Bomb"
- Rabeh Al-Hussaini - "Rabehlation"
- Jimmy Alapag - "The Mighty Mouse"
- Kevin Alas - "The Ace Player"
- Raymond Almazan - "Rock N' Roll"
- Paul Alvarez - "Mr. Excitement"
- Baser Amer - "The Hammer"
- Dondon Ampalayo - "The Magic Man"
- Mark Andaya - "Big Mac"
- Marlou Aquino - "The Skyscraper"
- Wynne Arboleda - "The Snatcher"
- John Arigo - "The Arsenal"
- Francis Arnaiz - "Mr. Clutch"
- Paul Artadi - "Kid Lightning"
- Nelson Asaytono - "The Bull"

=== B ===
- Gido Babilonia - "Prinsipe K, "The Babylon"
- Nonoy Baclao - "Mr. Swat"
- Cyrus Baguio - "Skyrus"
- Bonel Balingit - "Mt. Balingit", "Man Mountain"
- Estong Ballesteros - "Estrong"
- Jason Ballesteros - "Gagamboy"
- Mac Baracael - "Kalibre 45"
- Mark Barroca - "Coffee Prince", "Hotdog Prince", "Star Barroca"
- Billy Ray Bates - "Black Superman"
- Felix "Donbel" Belano - "Felix The Cat"
- Nic Belasco - "St. Nic"
- Beau Belga - "Big Beau", "Extra Rice"
- Mac Belo - "Big Mac"
- Egay Billones - "Billion Dollar Man"
- Norman Black - "That Old Black Magic", "Mr.100%"
- Cris Bolado - "Jumbo", "Lucky Charm"
- Ken Bono - "The Fertilizer"
- Ricky Brown - "The Quick Brown Fox"
- Ronjay Buenafe - "The Red Dragon"
- Paolo Bugia - "The Boogey Man"

=== C ===
- Alex Cabagnot - "The Crunchman"
- Elmer "Boy" Cabahug - "The Hitman", "The Silencer"
- Sonny Cabatu - "Mr. Quality Minutes"
- Brandon Cablay - "Black Cat", "Sky High"
- Mark Caguioa - "The Spark", "MC47", "The Furious", "The Blonde Bomber"
- Allan Caidic - "The Triggerman"
- Chris Calaguio - "Hot Hands"
- Hector Calma - "The Director"
- Nino Canaleta - "KG" "Da Vinci of Dunks"
- Jeffrey Cariaso - "The Jet"
- Mark Cardona - "Captain Hook"
- Noy Castillo - "The Golden Boy"
- Jayson Castro - "The Blur"
- Philip Cezar - "The Scholar", “Mr. Stretch”, "Tapal King"
- Sean Chambers - "Mr. 100%"
- Jeff Chan - "The Negros Sniper"
- Justin Chua - "The Great Wall of Chua"
- Atoy Co - “The Fortune Cookie”
- Jerry Codiñera - "The Defense Minister"
- Jackson Corpuz - "Pinoy Fukuda"
- Mike Cortez - "Cool Cat"
- Carl Bryan Cruz - "CBC"
- Jacinto Ciria Cruz - "Jumping Jack"
- Mark Cruz - "The Antman"

=== D ===
- Gary David - "El Granada"
- Bal David - "The Flash"
- Ranidel De Ocampo - "RDO", "Hodor", "Pambansang Siko"
- Anthony "Tony" Dela Cruz - "TDLC"
- Maximo "Max" Delantes - "Mad Max"
- Joe Devance - "JDV"
- Yves Dignadice - "Mr. Adonis of PBA"
- Jared Dillinger - "The Daredevil"
- Rudy Distrito - “The Destroyer”
- Marcus Douthit - "Big Daddy"
- Joel Dualan - "El Aparador"
- Kenneth Duremdes - "Captain Marbel"

=== E ===
- Chris Ellis - "Air Force Ellis"
- Itoy Esguerra - "Rifleman"
- Dennis Espino - "Dennis the Menace"
- Gerry Esplana - "Mr. Cool"

=== F ===
- Bernie Fabiosa - "The Sultan of Swipe", "The Fabulous"
- June Mar Fajardo - "The Kraken"
- Mon Fernandez - "El Presidente"
- Danny Florencio - "Daredevil" "Daredevil Danny"
- Larry Fonacier - "The Baby-faced Assassin"

=== G ===
- Matt Ganuelas-Rosser - "Black Panther" "The Manager"
- Jayvee Gayoso - "Mr. Adrenaline"
- Willie Generalao - "The Little General"
- Isaac Go - "The Big Chill"
- Wesley Gonzales - "Wild Wild Wes"
- Dante Gonzalgo - "Iron Man"
- Joey Guanio - "Cha -Cha"
- Rey Guevarra - "Fafa Rey"

=== H ===
- Tony Harris - "The Hurricane"
- Rudy Hatfield - "The H-Bomb"
- Bong Hawkins - "The Hawk"
- Jayjay Helterbrand - "The Fast", "Helter Skelter"
- Vince Hizon - "The Prince"
- Dondon Hontiveros - "The Cebuano Hotshot"
- Maui Huelar - "Flying Fish"

=== I ===
- Danny Ildefonso - "Lakay", “Demolition Man”
- JC Intal - "The Rocket"

=== J ===
- Chris Jackson - "Stonewall"
- Pido Jarencio - "The Fireman"
- Robert Jaworski - "Big J", "The Living Legend", "Sonny"
- Jio Jalalon - "Cyclone", "The Bus Driver"
- Bobby Jose - "The Firecracker"

=== L ===
- Garvo Lanete - "Gabo"
- Marcio Lassiter - "Super Marcio"
- Jojo Lastimosa - "Jolas", "4th Quarterman", "Mr. Clutch"
- Paul Lee - "Lethal Weapon" ,"Ang Angas ng Tondo", "Leethal Star",
- Samboy Lim - "The Sky Walker", "The Dragon"
- Jun Limpot - "The Main Man", "The Big Deal"
- Rudy Lingganay - "Anay"
- Renato Lobo - "Etok"
- Noli Locsin - "The Tank"
- Caloy Loyzaga - "The Big Difference"
- Chito Loyzaga - "The Dynamite"

=== M ===
- Ronnie Magsanoc - "The Point Laureate"
- Romulo "Romy" Mamaril - "Mama"
- Jett Manuel - "Gingineer"
- Vic Manuel - "The Muscle Man"
- Dave Marcelo - "Dave Gwapo"
- Ronnie Matias - "Batas ni Matias"
- Justin Melton - "QuickMelt", "Flying Minion"
- Eric Menk - “Major Pain”, "Sgt. Rock"
- Vergel Meneses - "The Aerial Voyager"
- Joey Mente - "Kuryente"
- Sol Mercado - "Sol Train"
- Willie Miller - "The Thriller"
- Emman Monfort - "The Minion"
- Kib Montalbo - "Man of Steal"
- Rafael Morales - "Baby Boy"
- Lauro Mumar - "The Fox"
- Larry Mumar - "The Little Fox"

=== N ===
- Gabe Norwood - "Mr. President"
- Rey Nambatac - " Stingrey "

=== P ===
- Manny Pacquiao - "Pacman"
- Victor Pablo - "The Conqueror"
- Jun Papa - "Deadshot Rifleman"
- Benjie Paras - "The Tower of Power", "Dunkin' Donato"
- Alvin Patrimonio - "The Captain", "Captain Lion Heart"
- Ali Peek - "Man Mountain"
- CJ Perez - "Baby Beast", "The Predator"
- Mick Pennisi - "The Slick" & "Big Daddy P", "Mr. Flop"
- Dorian Peña - "The Big Dawg"
- Jason Perkins - "Hefty Lefty"
- Marc Pingris - "Pinoy Sakuragi"
- Davon Potts – "Mr. Fourth Quarter"
- Stanley Pringle - "Stan The Man"
- Dindo Pumaren - “The Bullet”

=== R ===
- Francisco Rabat - "Rajah of Rebounds"
- Kevin Racal - "K-Racs"
- Olsen Racela - "Ra-Ra-Racela"
- Bong Ravena - "The Raven"
- Kiefer Ravena - "The Phenom"
- Kerby Raymundo- "The Kid"
- Rafi Reavis - "The Ostrich"
- Aldrich Reyes - "Moking"
- Alberto Reynoso - "Big Boy"
- Billy Ray Robles - "Ilonggo Superman"
- Topex Robinson - "The Pitbull"
- Terrence Romeo - "The Bro", "Swaggy T"
- Renren Ritualo - "The Rainman"
- Troy Rosario - "The Terminator "

=== Q ===
- J.R. Quinahan - other half of "Extra Rice, Inc.", with Beau Belga, "Baby Shaq"

=== S ===
- Sunday Salvacion - "Sunday's Special"
- Terry Saldana - "The Plastic Man"
- Kent Salado - "Conductor"
- Arwind Santos - "The Spiderman"
- Rodney Santos - "The Slasher"
- Danny Seigle - "Dynamite"
- Oscar "Biboy" Simon - "The Assassin"
- Herminio Silva - "Herr" Silva
- Peter June Simon - "The Scoring Apostle"
- Greg Slaughter - "Gregzilla"
- Christian Standhardinger - "The Bulldozer"
- Rudy Soriano - "Magic Man"
- Roi Sumang - "Super Sumang"

=== T ===
- Asi Taulava - "The Rock", "Ageless Rock"
- Moala Tautuaa - "Big Mo" "Pebbles"
- Alvin Teng - "RoboCop"
- Jeron Teng - "Intengsity",
- LA Tenorio - "The Lieutenant", "Teniente, "Showtime", "Mr. Showtime", "The Gineral", "Ironman Of PBA",
- Scottie Thompson - "The Hustle Man"
- Sonny Thoss - "The Boss"
- Richie Ticzon - "The Velvet Touch"
- Chester Tolomia - "Elevator"
- Jimwell Torion - "Tora-Tora"
- Norbert Torres - "The Bear"
- Ronald Tubid - "The Saint", "The Fearless"
- Lordy Tugade - "The Alaminos Assassin"

=== U ===
- Josh Urbiztondo - "The Fireball"

=== V ===
- Junthy Valenzuela - "Hitman"
- Luis "Tito" Varela - "Kojak"
- Arnold Van Opstal - "AVO"
- Emmanuel Victoria - "Boybits", "Boy Bitin"
- Yoyoy Villamin- “Bicolano Superman”
- Enrico Villanueva - "The Raging Bull", "E.Vill"

=== W ===
- Jay Washington - "J-Wash"
- Steve Watson - "Bandana Kid"
- Freddie Webb - "Fastbreak Freddie"
- Matthew Wright - "Mr. Wright"
- William Wilson - "Double W"
- Kelly Williams - "Machine Gun Kelly"

=== Y ===
- James Yap - "Big Game James", "The Man With A Million Moves"
- Roger Yap - "Roger Rabbit"
- Joseph Yeo - "The Ninja"

== Coaches ==
- Virgilio "Baby" Dalupan - "Maestro"

== Sportscasters and other personalities ==
- Ramon Ang - "RSA"
- Quinito Henson - "The Dean"
- Joe Cantada - "Smokin' Joe"
- Andy Jao - "Dr. J"
- Manny Pangilinan - "MVP"
- Randy Sacdalan - "The Professor"

== Tandems ==
- Beau Belga and JR Quiñahan - "Extra Rice, Inc."
- Mark Caguioa and Jayjay Helterbrand - "The Fast and the Furious"
- Jio Jalalon and Kent Salado - "The Bus Driver and the Conductor"
- Evan Nelle and James Kwekuteye - "The Bandana Bros."
- Ricky Relosa and Yoyoy Villamin - "Bruise Brothers"
- Terrence Romeo and Stanley Pringle - "Slash Brothers"

== Teams ==
=== Collegiate ===
- 1950 Letran Knights - "Murder, Inc."
- Ateneo–UP rivalry - "The Battle of Katipunan"
- Ateneo–La Salle rivalry - "The Mother of all Rivalries"
- FEU–UE rivalry - "The Battle of the East / Battle of Morayta"
- Letran–Mapua rivalry - "The Battle of Intramuros"
- UP–UST rivalry - "Battle of the Church and State"
- Ateneo–Adamson rivalry- "Battle of the Birds"

=== Professional ===
- Alaska Aces - "The Team of the 90's", "#WeNotMe"
- Barangay Ginebra San Miguel - "Brgy. Ginebra", "NSD (Never-Say-Die)"
- Ginebra–Purefoods rivalry - "Manila Clasico"
- Purefoods–Rain or Shine rivalry - "New-age Rivalry", "KontraPelo"

=== National teams ===
- 1936 men's Summer Olympics team - "The Islanders"
- 1992 men's Asian Games team - "The Philippine Dream Team"
- 1998 men's Asian Games team - "The Philippine Centennial Team"
- 2018 men's Asian Games team - "GilastoPainters"
- Men's junior national basketball team - "Batang Gilas"
- Men's national basketball team - "Gilas"
- Men's national basketball "B" team - "Gilas Cadets" / "Sinag"
- Women's junior national basketball team - "Batang Perlas"
- Women's national basketball team - "Perlas" / "Gilas Women"

== Locations ==
- Smart Araneta Coliseum - The Big Dome
- PhilSports Arena - The ULTRA

== Leagues ==
- National Collegiate Athletic Association (Philippines) - "The Grand Old League"

== Items ==
- Jun Bernardino Trophy - "The Perpetual Trophy"
- Philippine Basketball Association player awards - "The Leo"

== See also ==
- Nickname
- List of athletes by nickname
- Lists of nicknames – nickname list articles on Wikipedia
