= List of Philippine Basketball Association career assists leaders =

This is a list of Philippine Basketball Association players by total career assists.

Statistics accurate as of January 16, 2023.

Italics^	Active PBA player
*	Named as one of the “40 Greatest Players in PBA History”

Rank	Player	Position(s)	Years played	Team(s) played	Games played	Total assists	Assists per game average
1	Robert Jaworski*	PG	1975–1998	Toyota, Ginebra/Añejo Rum/Tondeña 65/Gordon's Gin	958	5,825	6.1
2	Ramon Fernandez*	C/PF	1975–1994	Toyota, Beer Hausen/Manila Beer, Tanduay, Purefoods, San Miguel	1,074	5,220	4.9
3	Dindo Pumaren	PG	1989–2002	Purefoods/Coney Island, Pepsi, Tanduay, FedEx	692	4,043	5.8
4	Johnny Abarrientos*	PG	1993–2010	Alaska, Pop Cola, Coca-Cola, Barangay Ginebra	742	3,757	5.1
5	Alex Cabagnot^	PG	2005–present	Sta. Lucia, Coca-Cola, Burger King, San Miguel/Petron, GlobalPort, Terrafirma	689	3,470	5.0
6	Jimmy Alapag*	PG	2003–2016	Talk 'N Text/TNT, Meralco	601	3,406	5.7
7	LA Tenorio^	PG	2006–present	San Miguel/Magnolia, Alaska, Barangay Ginebra	738	3,390	4.6
8	Willie Generalao	PG	1980–1991	Gilbey’s Gin/St. George Whiskies, Tanduay, Purefoods, Pepsi	550	3,256	5.9
9	Ronnie Magsanoc*	PG	1989–2002	Shell, Sta. Lucia, Purefoods	618	3,228	5.2
10	Philip Cezar*	PF/C	1975–1991	Crispa/Walk Tall, Shell, Great Taste/Presto, Añejo Rum/Ginebra	918	3,130	3.4
11	Olsen Racela	PG	1993–2011	Coney Island/Purefoods, San Miguel/Magnolia	925	3,085	3.4
12	Francis Arnaiz*	SG/PG	1975–1986	Toyota, Ginebra	613	2,938	4.6
13	Bernie Fabiosa*	PG	1975–1991	Crispa/Walk Tall, Shell, Great Taste/Presto, Purefoods, Diet Sarsi/Swift	788	2,853	3.6
14	Jayson Castro*^	PG	2008–present	Talk 'N Text/TNT	628	2,936	4.7
15	Chris Ross^	PG	2010–present	Coca-Cola, Sta. Lucia, Meralco, San Miguel/Petron	528	2,666	5.0
16	Atoy Co*	SG	1975–1988	Crispa/Walk Tall, Manila Beer, Great Taste/Presto	749	2,640	3.5
17	Ricardo Brown*	PG	1983– 1989	Great Taste, Northern Cement, San Miguel	NA	2,480	7.3
18	Gerry Esplana	PG	1990–2003	Presto, Sta. Lucia, Shell	577	2,459	4.3
19	Willie Miller*	SG/PG	2003–2015	Red Bull, Talk 'N Text, Alaska, Barangay Ginebra, Barako Bull, GlobalPort	643	2,442	3.8
20	Frankie Lim	PG	1982–1996	Tanduay, Great Taste, Alaska, Coney Island/Purefoods, Shell, San Miguel	695	2,395	3.5

== See also ==
- List of Philippine Basketball Association players
