= List of Philippine Basketball Association career rebounding leaders =

This is a list of the Philippine Basketball Association players in total career rebounds.

Statistics accurate and correct as of February 1, 2026.

| Italics^ | Active PBA player |
| * | Named as one of the “50 Greatest Players in PBA History” |
| ^{~} | Played as import |

| Rank | Player | Position(s) | Years played | Team(s) played | Games played | Offensive rebounds | Defensive rebounds | Total rebounds | Rebounds per game average |
|---|---|---|---|---|---|---|---|---|---|
| 1 | Ramon Fernandez* | C/PF | 1975–1994 | Toyota, Beer Hausen/Manila Beer, Tanduay, Purefoods, San Miguel | 1,074 | 2,217 | 6,435 | 8,652 | 8.1 |
| 2 | Abet Guidaben* | C/PF | 1975–1995 | Crispa/Walk Tall, Tanduay, Manila Beer, Magnolia/San Miguel, Purefoods, Alaska, Pepsi/7–Up, Shell | 1,081 | 2,373 | 6,197 | 8,570 | 7.9 |
| 3 | June Mar Fajardo* | C | 2013–present | Petron/San Miguel | 550 | 2,415 | 4,625 | 7,040 | 12.6 |
| 4 | Jerry Codiñera* | C | 1988–2005 | Purefoods/Coney Island, Mobiline/Talk 'N Text, FedEx | 871 | 2,411 | 4,623 | 7,034 | 8.1 |
| 5 | Asi Taulava* | C | 1999–2023 | Mobiline/Talk 'N Text, Coca-Cola, Meralco, Air21, NLEX | 624 | NA | NA | 6,412 | 10.3 |
| 6 | Alvin Patrimonio* | PF/SF | 1988–2005 | Purefoods/Coney Island | 857 | 1,706 | 4,446 | 6,152 | 7.2 |
| 7 | Arwind Santos*^ | PF/SF | 2006–present | Air21/Burger King, San Miguel/Petron, NorthPort | 730 | NA | NA | 5,987 | 8.2 |
| 8 | Philip Cezar* | PF/C | 1975–1991 | Crispa/Walk Tall, Shell, Great Taste/Presto, Añejo Rum/Ginebra | 918 | 1,626 | 4,208 | 5,834 | 6.4 |
| 9 | Robert Jaworski* | PG | 1975–1998 | Toyota, Ginebra/Añejo Rum/Tondeña 65/Gordon's Gin | 958 | 1,781 | 3,586 | 5,367 | 5.6 |
| 10 | Norman Black^{~} | PF/SF | 1981–1990 | Tefilin, San Miguel/Magnolia, Great Taste, Alaska, Pop Cola | 282 | 1,407 | 3,926 | 5,333 | 18.9 |
| 11 | Abe King | PF/C | 1977–1994 | Toyota, Gold Eagle, Great Taste/Presto, Coney Island/Purefoods | 782 | 1,942 | 3,280 | 5,222 | 6.7 |
| 12 | Yoyoy Villamin | PF | 1981–1998 | Crispa, Manila Beer, Alaska, Diet Sarsi/Swift/Sunkist, Pepsi/Mobiline, San Miguel | 871 | 1,766 | 3,397 | 5,163 | 5.9 |
| 13 | Ali Peek | C/PF | 1998–2014 | Pop Cola, Alaska, Coca-Cola, Talk 'N Text, Sta. Lucia | 649 | 2,010 | 3,148 | 5,158 | 8.0 |
| 14 | Rafi Reavis^ | C/PF | 2002–present | Coca-Cola, Barangay Ginebra, Purefoods/B-Meg Derby Ace/B-Meg/San Mig Coffee/San Mig Super Coffee/Star/Magnolia | 835 | NA | NA | 4,910 | 5.9 |
| 15 | Marc Pingris* | PF/C | 2004–2019 | FedEx, Purefoods/B-Meg Derby Ace/B-Meg/San Mig Coffee/San Mig Super Coffee/Star/Magnolia, Magnolia/San Miguel | 658 | NA | NA | 4,773 | 7.3 |
| 16 | Nic Belasco | PF | 1997–2014 | Pop Cola, San Miguel, Alaska, Welcoat, Coca-Cola/Powerade, Talk 'N Text, Sta. Lucia | 689 | 1,474 | 3,276 | 4,750 | 6.9 |
| 17 | Dorian Peña | C | 2001–2016 | San Miguel/Petron, Air21/Barako Bull, Barangay Ginebra, GlobalPort | 623 | 1,974 | 2,644 | 4,618 | 7.4 |
| 18 | Terry Saldaña | PF | 1982–1998 | Toyota, Gilbey’s Gin/Ginebra/Gordon’s Gin, Alaska, Pop Cola/Sarsi/Diet Sarsi/Swift, Shell | 766 | 1,802 | 2,736 | 4,538 | 5.9 |
| 19 | Nelson Asaytono | PF/SF | 1989–2005 | Purefoods, Swift/Sunkist/Pop Cola, San Miguel, Red Bull | 820 | 1,242 | 3,227 | 4,469 | 5.5 |
| 20 | Eric Menk | C/PF | 1999–2016 | Tanduay, Barangay Ginebra, GlobalPort, Alaska | 553 | 1,647 | 2,809 | 4,456 | 8.1 |
| 21 | Manny Victorino | C | 1981–1996 | Presto/Great Taste/N-Rich, Shell, Pepsi/7-Up, Ginebra, Purefoods, Sunkist | 727 | 1,583 | 2,867 | 4,450 | 6.1 |

== See also ==
- List of Philippine Basketball Association players
