= List of Philippine Basketball Association career 3-point scoring leaders =

This is a list of the Philippine Basketball Association players by total three-point field goals made.

Statistics accurate as of September 15, 2024.

Italics^	Active PBA player
*	Named as one of the “40 Greatest Players in PBA History”

Rank	Player	Position(s)	Years played	Team(s) played	Games played	Total 3-point field goals made	Total 3-point field goals attempted	3-point field goal percentage
1	Marcio Lassiter^	SF/SG	2011–present	Powerade, San Miguel/Petron	538	1,254	2,935	0.390
2	Jimmy Alapag*	PG	2003–2016	Talk 'N Text, Meralco	601	1,250	3,472	0.360
3	Allan Caidic*	SG	1987–1999	Great Taste/Presto, San Miguel	598	1,242	3,375	0.368
4	LA Tenorio^	PG	2006–present	San Miguel/Magnolia, Alaska, Barangay Ginebra	738	1,219	3,617	0.337
5	James Yap*^	SG/SF	2004–present	Purefoods/B-Meg Derby Ace/B-Meg/San Mig Coffee/San Mig Super Coffee/Star, Rain or Shine	734	1,178	3,747	0.314
6	Ronnie Magsanoc*	PG	1989–2002	Shell, Sta. Lucia, Purefoods	618	1,171	3,057	0.383
7	Dondon Hontiveros	SG/SF	2000–2017	Tanduay, San Miguel/Petron, Air21, Alaska	736	1,133	3,293	0.344
8	Arwind Santos*^	PF/SF	2006–present	Air21, San Miguel/Petron, NorthPort	730	1,088	3,865	0.282
9	Alfonso Solis	PG	1987–2001	Formula Shell, Purefoods, Swift/Sunkist, Pepsi/Mobiline, Batang Red Bull	680	1,000	2,745	0.364
10	Paul Lee^	SG/PG	2011–present	Rain or Shine, Star/Magnolia	520	976	2,750	0.353
11	Mick Pennisi	C/PF	2000–2017	Red Bull, San Miguel/Petron, Barako Bull, Purefoods Star/Star, Phoenix, GlobalPort	664	958	2,703	0.354
12	Alex Cabagnot^	PG	2005–present	Sta. Lucia, Coca-Cola, Burger King, San Miguel/Petron, GlobalPort, Terrafirma, Converge	689	947	2,978	0.318
13	Ronald Tubid	SG/SF	2003–2019	Shell, Air21, Barangay Ginebra, Barako Bull Energy, Petron/San Miguel, Columbian	720	920	2,795	0.329
14	Larry Fonacier	SG/SF	2005–2022	Red Bull, Magnolia, Alaska, Talk 'N Text/TNT, NLEX	683	870	2,475	0.352
15	KG Canaleta	SF/PF	2005–2021	Air21, Purefoods/B-Meg Derby Ace/B-Meg, Air21, Barangay Ginebra, Talk 'N Text, NLEX, Mahindra, GlobalPort, Blackwater	594	846	2,480	0.341
16	Jayson Castro*^	PG	2008–present	Talk 'N Text/TNT	628	834	2,439	0.342
17	Willie Miller*	SG/PG	2003–2015	Red Bull, Talk 'N Text, Alaska, Barangay Ginebra, Barako Bull, GlobalPort	643	821	2,478	0.331
18	Ranidel de Ocampo	PF	2004–2019	FedEx/Air21, Talk 'N Text/TNT, Meralco	647	818	2,312	0.354
19	Renren Ritualo	SG	2002–2014	FedEx, Talk 'N Text, Powerade, Meralco, Shopinas.com/Air21	429	773	2,366	0.327
20	Mark Caguioa*	SG	2001–2020	Barangay Ginebra	744	703	2,288	0.307
21	Jayjay Helterbrand*	PG/SG	2000–2017	Barangay Ginebra	590	701	2,131	0.329
22	Gary David	SG	2004–2017	Coca-Cola/Powerade, Air21, GlobalPort, Meralco, San Miguel, Mahindra	465	680	2,078	0.327
23	Sunday Salvacion	SF	2003–2016	Barangay Ginebra, Barako Bull, San Miguel/Petron, Barako Bull, Meralco, Blackwater, GlobalPort	492	668	2,106	0.317
24	Olsen Racela	PG	1993–2011	Coney Island/Purefoods, San Miguel	925	655	1,961	0.334
25	Robert Jaworski*	PG	1975–1998	Toyota, Ginebra/Añejo Rhum/Tondeña 65/Gordon's Gin	958	649	2,061	0.315
26	Lordy Tugade	SG/SF	1993–2012	Red Bull, San Miguel, Powerade	463	614	1,864	0.329

== See also ==
- List of Philippine Basketball Association players
