= Ronnie Magsanoc =

Filipino basketball player and coach

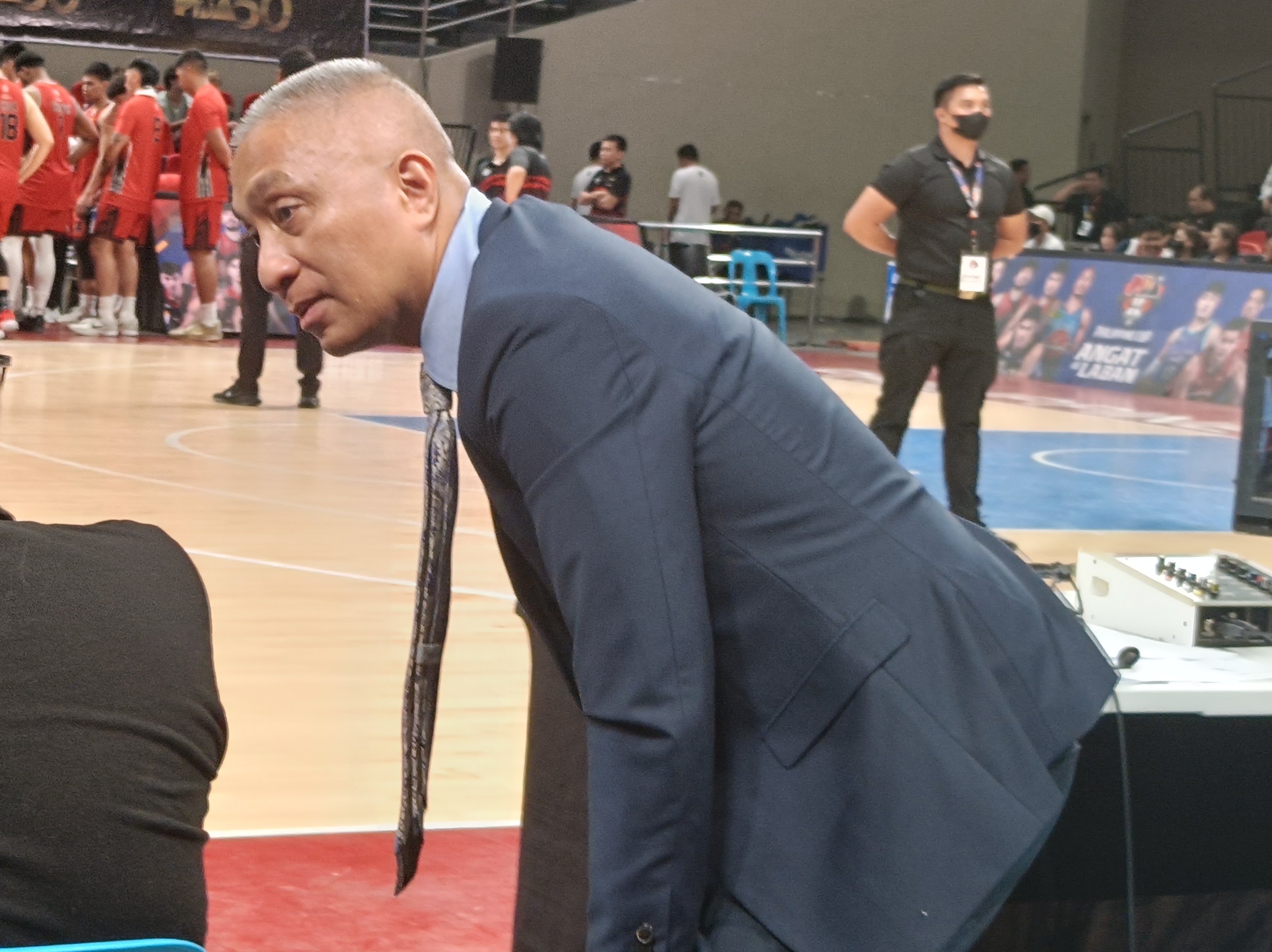
- Magsanoc in 2025

Personal information
- Born: April 11, 1966 (age 60)
- Listed height: 5 ft 9 in (1.75 m)
- Listed weight: 155 lb (70 kg)

Career information
- High school: San Beda (Manila)
- College: UP
- PBA draft: 1988: 1st round, 2nd overall pick
- Drafted by: Shell Oilers
- Playing career: 1988–2002
- Position: Point guard
- Coaching career: 2002–present

Career history

Playing
- 1988–1998: Formula Shell
- 1998–2000: Sta. Lucia Realtors
- 2001–2002: Purefoods Tender Juicy Hotdogs

Coaching
- 2002–2010: Purefoods (assistant)
- 2010–2023: Meralco Bolts (assistant)
- 2012–2013: San Beda
- 2014–2015: Hapee Fresh Fighters
- 2014–2015: Ateneo (assistant)

Career highlights
- As player: 3× PBA champion (1990 First Conference, 1992 First Conference, 2002 Governors'); PBA Mythical First Team (1990); 3× PBA Mythical Second Team (1989, 1991, 1992); 7× PBA All-Star (1989, 1990, 1991, 1992, 1993, 1994, 1995); 50 Greatest Players in PBA History (2000 selection); PBA Comeback Player of the Year (2002); UAAP champion (1986); PBA Hall of Famer (2013); As coach: NCAA champion (2012); As assistant coach: 2x PBA champion (2006 Philippine, 2009–10 Philippine)
Medals
Men's basketball
Representing Philippines
Asian Games
Bronze medal – third place	1986 Seoul	Team
Silver medal – second place	1990 Beijing	Team
SEA Games
Gold medal – first place	1987 Jakarta	Team

Ronald Magsanoc is a Filipino professional basketball coach, analyst, and former player in the Philippine Basketball Association (PBA). He was known for his moniker "The Point Laureate".

== Early life and high school career ==
Magsanoc grew up a sports fan. He attended San Beda ever since grade school. Wanting to join San Beda's sports teams and own one of their jerseys, he first tried out for their basketball team. He was cut from the team, which led him to join San Beda's volleyball team. A year later, he finally made the basketball team. Aside from those two sports, he also played football and track and field.

Together with head coach Ato Badolato, they won several NCAA juniors titles. In his fourth year of high school, Magsanoc became teammates with Benjie Paras in basketball and track and field. They won a gold medal together in track and field, then won the 1982 NCAA juniors title. In his last year with San Beda, he suffered from tendinitis.

== Collegiate career ==
Magsanoc enrolled in the University of the Philippines, as he wanted to study physical therapy while playing basketball. He then switched course to philosophy to balance his studies and commitments with the UP Fighting Maroons.

In 1986, Magsanoc reunited with Paras. Alongside Eric Altamirano, future UP head coach Goldwin Monteverde, Joey Guanio, and coach Joe Lipa, they helped the Maroons win the UAAP championship that year, their first basketball championship in 48 years. They also won the National Inter-collegiate championship that year. He graduated with a degree in philosophy after studying for five years. According to him, had he not played in the PBA, he would have used his degree in philosophy to teach either logic in UP, or theology in San Beda.

== Amateur career ==
Magsanoc saw action for YCO Shine Masters and Philips Sardines in the PABL.

== Professional career ==
=== Formula Shell (1989–1998) ===
Magsanoc joined the Philippine Basketball Association in 1988 and was picked by Formula Shell in that year's draft. Purefoods considered drafting him then trading him for Al Solis. In his rookie season, they made the 1988 Reinforced Conference finals.

The following season in his sophomore year, Magsanoc was reunited with former UP teammate Benjie Paras, who was the number one overall draft pick that year. The triumvirate of Magsanoc, Paras and seven-time best import Bobby Parks led Shell to the finals in the first conference each year from 1989 to 1992, winning two championships and placing runner-up twice. Magsanoc was considered by fans and experts alike as one of the best point guards in the league at the turn of the decade.

From 1993 to 1995, he remained one of the top point guards despite Shell missing the finals for three seasons and with the emergence of Alaska's Johnny Abarrientos. In 1996, Shell returned to the finals but Magsanoc missed out playing in the championship because of a knee injury.

In his last seasons with Shell, he struggled with injuries, eventually losing his starting role to Richie Ticzon.

=== Sta. Lucia Realtors (1998–2000) ===
In 1998, Magsanoc was traded to Sta. Lucia Realtors for Gerry Esplana. It was seen as one of the most surprising PBA trades of the decade. In his first conference with the team, the All-Filipino Cup, he contributed to their league-leading 4–0 start as one of the veteran leaders on the team. He was with Sta. Lucia for three seasons.

=== Purefoods Tender Juicy Hotdogs (2001–2002) ===
In 2001, Magsanoc considered retirement to become a sports analyst, as no team had signed him after his contract ended with Sta. Lucia. He then joined the Purefoods Tender Juicy Hotdogs as their point guard Dindo Pumaren had requested a trade. There, he was reunited with former YCO teammate in the PABL and national teammate Alvin Patrimonio. Together they won their final championship in the PBA in the 2002 Governors Cup despite their head coach and their most important players being lent to the national team. For his contributions to Purefoods' title that season, he was awarded Comeback Player of the Year.

In 2003, Magsanoc retired from the PBA, the same year Paras also retired from the league. He retired holding the record for all-time highest three-point field goal percentage with 38.3%. This record would not be broken until Marcio Lassiter in 2024 with 39%. He also retired with 1,171 three-pointers made, second only to Allan Caidic's 1,242.

== National team career ==
As a college player, Magsanoc had stints with the Philippine national team in the 1986 Asian Games, 1987 Jones Cup, ABC championships and SEA Games under coach Joe Lipa. Alongside Paras, they won a gold medal in the 1986 Guam Invitational and the 1987 SEA Games.

He was also a member of the all-professional Philippine National Team that took home the silver medal in the 1990 Asian Games.

== Coaching career ==
After retiring, Magsanoc focused mostly on raising his family. He started out as an assistant coach with the Purefoods Tender Juicy Giants, working alongside Ryan Gregorio. Later on, he would work with Gregorio again when Gregorio was named head coach of the Meralco Bolts. After Gregorio stepped down from the position, he remained as an assistant coach to Norman Black until Black was demoted in 2023. In addition to coaching, he appeared in several exhibition games including the NBA Asia Challenge in 2009 and the 2019 PBA All-Star Game.

In 2012, 10 years after retiring from the PBA, Magsanoc became the head coach of the San Beda Red Lions for the 88th season of the NCAA. He resigned from his coaching job in San Beda after winning a championship in his rookie year.

Magsanoc also worked as an assistant coach for the Ateneo Blue Eagles from 2014 to 2015. He also was the head coach for the Hapee Fresh Fighters of the PBA D-League. Under his guidance, Hapee won the 2014–15 PBA D-League Aspirants Cup.

Magsanoc was also the program director of the national 3x3 basketball program from 2019 to 2026. In 2023, he served as the UAAP basketball commissioner, overseeing junior basketball and 3x3 basketball.

== Broadcasting career ==
Magsanoc is a color commentator for the television coverage of the PBA from the mid-2000s, when his team was not playing. He also a color commentator to UAAP basketball and volleyball games in mid-2000s. He also served as a pre-game reporter for the Game 7 of 1998 PBA All-Filipino Cup finals. He returned to the PBA as a color analyst during the 2020s, commentating games for PBA Rush. When NBA games were being broadcast on S+A during the 2010s, he and Benjie Paras commentated the games.

Magsanoc formerly served as a play-by-play commentator in the Shakey's V-League 12th Season Collegiate Conference and in the Solar Sports coverage of the 2015 PSL Grand Prix Conference. He served as a color commentator when the league was changed as the Premier Volleyball League and being broadcast on S+A, (now in One Sports).

Since his start as a television commentator, he has also covered baseball, football, track and field, and major events such as the Olympics and Grand Slam tennis matches.

In 2026, Magsanoc will served as co-host along with Benjie Paras for a weekly sports talk show Walang Bolahan that aired Every Saturday afternoon from 4:00 PM to 5:00 PM over DWIZ and Aliw Channel 23.

== Personal life ==
Since 1988, Magsanoc has been married to Bing Badillo. They have three daughters. His brother is a former basketball coach. He is also the godfather of Bobby Ray Parks Jr.

== Awards and honors ==
PBA

- Five-time PBA champion
  - Three as a player (1990, 1992, 2002)
  - Two as an assistant coach (2006, 2009–10)
- Four-time PBA Mythical Team member
  - 1st Team (1990)
  - 2nd Team (1989, 1991–92)
- Seven-time PBA All-Star (1989–95)
- PBA's 25 Greatest Players
- PBA Hall of Fame
- PBA D-League champion (as coach - 2015)

Philippine national team

- 1987 SEA Games (as an amateur player)
- Head coach of 2019 SEA Games 3x3 Gold medal-winning team

High school and college

- NCAA juniors champion (1981, 1982)
- UAAP champion (1986)
- NCAA champion (2012)
- National Inter-collegiate champion (1986)

== Career statistics ==
Legend
GP	Games played	MPG	Minutes per game
FG%	Field-goal percentage	3P%	3-point field-goal percentage	FT%	Free-throw percentage
RPG	Rebounds per game	APG	Assists per game	SPG	Steals per game
BPG	Blocks per game	PPG	Points per game	**Bold**	Career high

=== Season-by-season averages ===
Year	Team	GP	MPG	FG%	3P%	FT%	RPG	APG	SPG	BPG	PPG
1988	Shell	37	33.0	.435	.364	.893	3.4	5.8	1.1	**.1**	14.8
1989	Shell	55	34.6	.495	.438	.874	2.8	6.7	1.0	.0	14.8
1990	Shell	52	40.2	.485	.440	.867	**4.4**	7.5	1.8	.0	19.8
1991	Shell	45	**43.1**	**.518**	.420	.891	3.9	**9.6**	1.5	.0	**20.0**
1992	Shell	46	40.6	.475	.404	.907	3.5	8.1	**1.7**	.0	17.0
1993	Shell	34	37.9	.480	.439	.880	3.4	7.6	1.0	.0	19.6
1994	Shell	44	38.0	.360	.272	.845	3.2	5.2	.6	.0	16.0
1995	Shell	43	31.8	.455	.399	.894	2.6	5.8	.7	.0	11.1
1996	Shell	**53**	31.0	.436	.382	.839	2.8	4.3	.6	.0	11.1
1997	Shell	44	24.3	.454	.413	.723	2.0	2.7	.5	.0	7.4
1998	Sta. Lucia	40	28.9	.397	.359	.795	2.1	3.4	.8	.0	8.6
1999	Sta. Lucia	35	30.1	.412	.385	.775	2.8	2.8	.7	**.1**	7.6
2000	Sta. Lucia	43	17.5	.313	.276	.750	1.7	1.4	.4	.0	4.6
2001	Purefoods	10	10.7	.333	**.500**	**1.000**	1.0	.6	.2	.0	1.4
2002	Purefoods	37	23.7	.376	.361	.906	1.6	2.1	.4	.0	5.0
Career		618	32.4	.449	.383	.862	2.9	5.2	.9	.0	12.7

== Head coaching record ==
=== Collegiate career ===
Season	Team	GP	W	L	PCT	Finish	PG	PW	PL	PCT	Results
2012	SBC	18	15	3	.833	2nd	4	3	1	.750	Champions
Totals		18	15	3	.833		4	3	1	.750	1 championship

== See also ==
- List of Philippine Basketball Association career assists leaders
- List of Philippine Basketball Association career steals leaders
- List of Philippine Basketball Association career 3-point scoring leaders
- List of Philippine Basketball Association career free throw percentage leaders
