= Lists of Philippine Basketball Association players =

This Philippine Basketball Association (PBA) page is used for splitting purposes to prevent this list from becoming too large. The following list articles have been created for easier navigation among all-time PBA players:

== Alphabetical ==
- List of Philippine Basketball Association players (A–E)
- List of Philippine Basketball Association players (F–J)
- List of Philippine Basketball Association players (K–O)
- List of Philippine Basketball Association players (P–T)
- List of Philippine Basketball Association players (U–Z)

== Specialty ==
- List of Philippine Basketball Association career steals leaders
- List of Philippine Basketball Association career scoring leaders
- List of Philippine Basketball Association career rebounding leaders
- List of Philippine Basketball Association career minutes played leaders
- List of Philippine Basketball Association career games played leaders
- List of Philippine Basketball Association career free throw scoring leaders
- List of Philippine Basketball Association career blocks leaders
- List of Philippine Basketball Association career assists leaders
- List of Philippine Basketball Association career 3-point scoring leaders
- 40 Greatest Players in PBA History
- List of Philippine Basketball Association imports
