= Alaska–San Miguel rivalry =

Defunct rivaly in the Philippine Basketball Association

- Teams: Alaska Aces; San Miguel Beermen
- First meeting: October 7, 1986; Magnolia 123, Alaska 110 (Note: The two only met at 1986 Open Conference due to Magnolia/San Miguel's leave of absence in first two conferences)
- Latest meeting: September 22, 2021; San Miguel 100, Alaska 101

Statistics
- Total meetings: 276 meetings (1986–2021)
- Largest victory: 38 (99–61), Alaska
- Longest win streak: 10, San Miguel (October 30, 1988 – August 3, 1989)

Postseason history
PBA Finals
- Series record: 5–4 (San Miguel leads)
- Win–loss record: 30–25 (San Miguel leads)
- 1987 Reinforced finals: San Miguel won, 4–1
- 1995 Governors' Cup Finals: Alaska won, 4–3
- 1998 All-Filipino: Alaska won, 4–3
- 1998 Commissioner's: Alaska won, 4–2
- 1999 Governors' Cup Finals: San Miguel won, 4–2
- 2010 Fiesta Finals: Alaska won, 4–2
- 2014–15 Philippine Cup Finals: San Miguel won, 4–3
- 2015 Governors' Cup Finals: San Miguel won, 4–0
- 2015–16 Philippine Cup Finals: San Miguel won, 4–3
PBA Playoffs
- Series record: 14–11 (San Miguel leads)
- Win–loss record: 37–34 (San Miguel leads)
- 1987 All-Filipino Round Robin Semifinals tie, 1–1
- 1987 Reinforced Round Robin Semifinals San Miguel won, 2–0
- 1988 Open Round Robin Semifinals San Miguel won, 2–0
- 1988 All-Filipino Third Place Alaska won, 3–2 (Note: The Third Place is best-of-3 series, added the 1-1 tie record for Semifinal round)
- 1988 Reinforced Round Robin Semifinals San Miguel won, 2–0
- 1989 Open Round Robin Semifinals San Miguel won, 2–0
- 1989 All-Filipino Round Robin Semifinals San Miguel won, 2–0
- 1989 Reinforced Round Robin Semifinals San Miguel won, 2–0
- 1990 First Conf. Round Robin Semifinals San Miguel won, 2–0
- 1990 All-Filipino Round Robin Semifinals San Miguel won, 2–0
- 1991 All-Filipino Third Place Alaska won, 3–2
- 1991 Third Conf. Round Robin Semifinals Alaska won, 2–0
- 1992 First Conf. Round Robin Semifinals Alaska won, 2–1 (Note: Alaska won two games of the Semifinal round, but lost on the Finals playoff berth)
- 1993 Commissioner's Cup Round Robin Semifinals Alaska won, 2–0
- 1994 All-Filipino Cup Round Robin Semifinals tie, 1–1
- 1994 Commissioner's Cup Round Robin Semifinals Alaska won, 2–0
- 1994 Governors' Cup Round Robin Semifinals tie, 1–1
- 1995 Commissioner's Cup Round Robin Semifinals San Miguel won, 102–95
- 1996 All-Filipino Cup Round Robin Semifinals San Miguel won, 2–0
- 1997 Commissioner's Cup Round Robin Semifinals tie, 1–1
- 1999 Commissioner's Cup Semifinals San Miguel won, 3–2
- 2000 All-Filipino Cup Semifinals Alaska won, 3–1
- 2000 Commissioner's Cup Semifinals San Miguel won, 3–0
- 2001 Commissioner's Cup Semifinals San Miguel won, 3–2
- 2002 Commissioner's Cup Semifinals Alaska won, 3–2
- 2005 PBA Fiesta playoff seeding San Miguel won, 73–71
- 2006 Philippine Cup Third Place Alaska won, 102–95
- 2007 PBA Fiesta Semifinals Alaska won, 4–2
- 2018 Governors' Cup Quarterfinals Alaska won, 96–85*

The Alaska–San Miguel rivalry is one of the former rivalries in the Philippine Basketball Association between Alaska Aces and San Miguel Beermen. The rivalry followed the popularity of Añejo–Purefoods rivalry (Manila Clasico) and probably one of the league's best rivalry especially in 1990s and mid 2010s.

== History ==
=== Post-EDSA & San Miguel's dominance ===
The two teams only started to face each other at the 1986 Open Conference due to San Miguel (then known as Magnolia) took leave of absence due to People Power Revolution and flight of owner Danding Cojuangco to Australia. The San Miguel/Magnolia franchise at this time are now owned by Sorianos (which also owned the team since its inaugural season). But while Magnolia is at leave of absence, Alaska hired former's Norman Black as their import, with Magnolia temporarily assigned Derrick Pumaren as the head coach. At their first conference together, Alaska reached quarterfinals while Magnolia dumped into last place.

In 1987 Reinforced Conference finals, San Miguel met Alaska, which under the banner of Hills Bros Coffee Kings. Alaska/Hill Bros, was led by Bogs Adornado and coached by Nat Canson who formerly served as San Miguel's head coach. The San Miguel won via a gentlemen's sweep, and Adornado retired to coach the team. After the finals bout, the two teams frequently facing each other at round-robin semifinals from 1987 until early 1990s. San Miguel is notable for clinching GrandSlam in 1989.

=== 1990s: Alaska's decade ===
After the 1989 first conference, Alaska tapped Vintage Television analyst Tim Cone and steered the team into multiple playoff rounds, a finals appearance in last conference of 1990, and a championship in 1991 of the same conference. But Alaska also faced setback, as Basketball Coaches Association of the Philippines (BCAP) filed a temporary restraining order against Tim Cone in some games of second conference. Cone's top lieutenant Chot Reyes will be tapped as interim head coach.

Both Alaska and San Miguel did not reached finals of any conferences in early 1990s, only met each other in round robin semifinals. But when Alaska acquired Jojo Lastimosa from Purefoods in 1991, with drafting Johnny Abarrientos in 1993, and trading high-flying Bong Alvarez to Sta. Lucia Realtors for mid-range assassin Bong Hawkins, Alaska started to improve and won a championship in 1994 Governors' Cup.

By 1995, the two met in the Governors' Cup Finals after eight years of their first finals match with Alaska, entered as defending champion of the conference. Bong Alvarez and Dong Polistico, now playing for San Miguel, contributed for their new team to lead 3-2 against Alaska. But Alaska's import Sean Chambers led his team to a two straight victories to topple San Miguel in Game 7. Alaska got their own GrandSlam run in 1996. By 1997, Norman Black quits and former national team head coach Ron Jacobs was tapped as new head coach. San Miguel only reached semifinals, while Alaska won last conference after letting Jeffrey Cariaso and acquiring Kenneth Duremdes.

In 1998, the two met at the first two conferences' finals. In the first conference, the San Miguel blew up another 3-2 finals series lead. In Game 7 of the said series, Alaska start strong but San Miguel worked their way back and made the scoring gap close. From a 43-all count, a 9–0 run by the Milkmen gave them a 52–43 lead going into the final quarter. Alaska was protecting a 10-point lead, 64–54, when San Miguel battled back with seven straight points anchored on a three-point play from Nelson Asaytono and a jumper by rookie Danny Ildefonso to close the gap, 61–64, entering the final two minutes. Two crucial errors by Asaytono where he lost the ball twice and a clutch basket by Alaska's Johnny Abarrientos sealed the outcome at 70–63. Kenneth Duremdes won on his first Finals MVP and Alaska captures on his eighth championship title.

In the 1998 Commissioner's Cup, Alaska defeated San Miguel in consecutive conferences, 4-2. In Game 6 of the said series, Alaska throw a 24-8 blast in first quarter, but San Miguel rallied and tied at 59 by early fourth quarter. As the score reads 74-71 in favor of Alaska, Kenneth Duremdes spark a 6-0 run and iced the game for the Milkmen, 80-71. Kenneth Duremdes won on his second back-to-back finals MVP and Alaska captures on his ninth championship title.

By 1999, San Miguel's Ron Jacobs faced issue on BCAP, and later replaced by his protégé Jong Uichico. In the 1999 Governors' Cup finals, Alaska and San Miguel faced each other again, with the latter come off from championship of the previous conference. San Miguel prevailed in the series 4-2.

=== 2000s: San Miguel early decade dominance ===
By 2000 to 2001, San Miguel dominated the league led by Ildefonso and Danny Seigle. Alaska managed to rebuild by early 2000s and stayed as one of the contenders in the league. The two teams did not met in a finals match until 2010 Fiesta, when LA Tenorio (a player drafted and played for San Miguel in his rookie year) and Cyrus Baguio led Alaska to dismantle San Miguel, 4-2.

=== 2010s: Tim Cone out, Petronovela, and Beeracle ===
With Tim Cone left Alaska, his long time assistant Joel Banal promoted to head coach. San Miguel become Petron Blaze Boosters, after acquiring the petroleum brand in 2011. The two rarely met in a playoff match, with Alaska winning a championship in 2013 Commissioner's Cup against Tenorio-led Ginebra.

In the 2014–15 Philippine Cup finals, as the league celebrates its 40th season, the two most successful franchises in league history battled for the Philippine Cup crown, with the Beermen once again almost blew a 3–2 series lead but relied on the heroics of Finals MVP Arwind Santos in the final 43 seconds of the seventh and deciding game to win, 80–78, and their first Game 7 finals victory over the Alaska. They faced once again in the 2015 Governors' Cup finals where the Beermen swept the Aces in four games, and June Mar Fajardo was awarded as the Finals MVP.

For the third time in the last four conferences, the San Miguel Beermen and the Alaska played in the championship anew in the finals rematch for the 2015–16 PBA Philippine Cup trophy. San Miguel achieved a historic feat of sorts, never before done in the whole history of the sport by coming back from a 0-3 series deficit to win four straight games over the Aces and successfully retain the crown. As the Beermen lost Fajardo due to injury for first four games of the series, the team were given up for lost in Game four before coming back and winning in overtime for their first victory in the best-of-seven series, two more victories, another overtime win in Game five and a morale and confidence-booster triumph in Game six put the Beermen to just a win away from making a historic comeback. This is the last time were the two ballclubs met in a finals series.

The two met again in a quarterfinal game in 2018 PBA Governors' Cup, with Alaska held twice-to-beat advantage and defeated 96-85. This serves as their final meeting in a playoff series.

=== 2020s: End of the rivalry ===
With rumors speculating around Alaska, the team officially announced by 2021 ending their rivalry with San Miguel.

== Notable last games ==
- 2017–18
  - Philippine Cup: 96–109 SMB
  - Commissioner's Cup: 105–103 ALASKA
  - Governors' Cup: 127–119 ALASKA
- 2019
  - Philippine Cup: 96–114 SMB
  - Commissioner's Cup: 107–119 SMB
  - Governors' Cup: 83–109 SMB
- 2020
  - Philippine Cup: 88–92 SMB
- 2021
  - Philippine Cup: 100–101 SMB
  - Governors' Cup: 99–94 ALA

== Personnel who served for both teams ==
=== Players ===
- Elpidio Villamin
- Frankie Lim
- Abet Guidaben
- Biboy Ravanes
- Paul Alvarez
- Dong Polistico
- Alvin Teng
- Frankie Lim
- Dwight Lago
- LA Tenorio
- Brandon Cablay
- Mike Cortez
- Bonbon Custodio
- Bryan Faundo
- Jay-R Reyes
- Wesley Gonzales
- Nonoy Baclao
- Gabby Espinas
- Samigue Eman
- Yousef Taha
- Dondon Hontiveros
- Vic Manuel
- Ronald Pascual
- Simon Enciso
- Robbie Herndon
- Jeron Teng
- Norman Black (Import)

=== Coaches ===
- Nat Canson
- Chot Reyes, served as Alaska's assistant coach (before 1993) and as San Miguel's head coach (2006–07)

=== Other occurrence ===
- Danny Ildefonso, played as San Miguel and later served as an assistant coach for Alaska
