= Joy Dionisio =

Filipino basketball player

Gregorio "Joy" Dionisio
Personal information
- Born: April 4 Bocaue, Bulacan, Philippines
- Listed height: 5 ft 9 in (1.75 m)

Career information
- College: Adamson
- PBA draft: 1975 Elevated
- Drafted by: Concepcion Carrier Weathermakers
- Playing career: 1975–1983
- Position: Point guard
- Number: 10 (Concepcion Carrier Weathermakers); 9 (Crispa Redmanizers)

Career history
- 1975-1976: Concepcion Carrier Weathermakers
- 1976–1981: Crispa Redmanizers
- 1982–1983: U/Tex Wranglers
- 1983: Galerie Dominique Artists

Career highlights
- Scored first basket in PBA history (1975); 8x PBA champion
Medals
Men's basketball
Representing the Philippines
Gold medal – first place	1972 Asian Basketball Confederation	Team competition

Gregorio "Joy" Dionisio (born April 4) is a retired Filipino professional basketball player. He was a guard and forward for the Adamson Falcons in the University Athletic Association of the Philippines (UAAP). In the pro ranks, he played much with the Crispa Redmanizers in the PBA.

== Playing career ==
After playing his last UAAP year, Dionisio reunited with his fellow Adamson star Ompong Segura when they played in the Asian Basketball Confederation (ABC) and won gold for the Philippine national team in 1972. His other teammates included Atoy Co, Ramon Fernandez, Philip Cezar, and Rino Salazar.

At PBA's inaugural season, Dionisio hit the first basket on April 9, 1975, at the Araneta Coliseum and went on to become an eight-time champion in the pro league.

== See also ==
- Philippine Basketball Association
- Philippine national basketball team
- History of Philippine Basketball

== Notes ==
- 1989-1990 PBA Annual. Philippines: Philippine Basketball Association. 1990.
- Liwayway. Liwayway Pub., 1971. 1971.
- Stamps of the Philippines: Historical and Topical Collections, 1854-2004. Philippine Small and Medium Business Development Foundation. 2008. ISBN 978-971-92464-1-1.
