= Cisco Oliver =

American basketball player

Israel "Cisco" Oliver Jr. (born December 28, 1947) is a retired American professional basketball player.

Oliver stood 6'6" tall and weighed 210 lbs. He played for Elizabeth City State University and was drafted by the Portland Trail Blazers in the tenth round of the 1970 NBA draft. He later played in the very first season of Asia's first professional basketball league, the Philippine Basketball Association during its inaugural season in 1975 with the Mariwasa-Noritake Porcelain makers. Oliver spent three more seasons in the PBA with two teams, also playing for Presto/Great Taste in his final year in 1978, and appeared in TV commercials.

== PBA Career stats ==
Season	Team	GP	FG-PCT	REBS.	PTS	AVE.
1975	Noritake	16	49.20	210	546	34.10
1977	Presto	19	51.33	170	628	33.05
1978	Honda	11	50.46	155	412	37.45
1978	Great Taste	13	49.10	145	416	31.92
