= 1975 PBA season =

First PBA season

- Duration: April 9 – December 14, 1975
- Teams: 9
- TV partner: BBC
- Season MVP: Bogs Adornado (Crispa Redmanizers)
- First Conference champions: Toyota Comets
- First Conference runners-up: Crispa Redmanizers
- Second Conference champions: Toyota Comets
- Second Conference runners-up: Crispa Redmanizers
- All-Philippine Championship champions: Crispa Redmanizers
- All-Philippine Championship runners-up: Toyota Comets

Seasons
- Inaugural Season 1976 →

The 1975 PBA season was the inaugural season of the Philippine Basketball Association.

== Notable events ==
In 1975, nine big corporations with basketball teams in the Manila Industrial Commercial Athletic Association (MICAA) declared their independence from the Basketball Association of the Philippines and formed the first professional basketball league in Asia, the Philippine Basketball Association (PBA).

On April 9, the PBA opened with its inaugural double-header at the Araneta Coliseum, with a sellout crowd of 18,000 watching, the Marisawa-Noritake Porcelain Makers defeated Concepcion Carrier, 101–98, in the opening game while Toyota Comets won over U/Tex Weavers, 105–101, in the main game. Gregorio "Joy" Dionisio of Carrier scored the first basket in PBA history.

In front of 11,000 fans at the Rizal Memorial Coliseum on May 10, the Crispa-Floro Redmanizers and Toyota Comets clash for the first time in what could be the start of their long-storied rivalry. The Redmanizers hacked out a 139–133 victory to hand the Comets their first loss of the season and halted their seven-game winning streak. Bogs Adornado topscored for Crispa with 29 points.

== All-Star games ==
In pioneering version of All-star games on December 23, the Brown team coach by Baby Dalupan beats Dante Silverio's Yellow squad, 126–123, in the third and deciding match of the PBA Ovaltine dream games. Members of the Brown team were Ramon Fernandez, William Adornado, Rudolf Kutch, Rudy Soriano, Atoy Co, Francis Arnaiz, Larry Mumar, Dave Regullano, Freddie Hubalde, Reynaldo Alcantara, Estoy Estrada, Rey Franco, Cristino Reynoso, Jimmy Noblezada and Romy Cabading, the Yellow team were composed of Robert Jaworski, Rosalio Martirez, Bernie Fabiosa, Johnny Revilla, Lim Eng Beng, Gregorio Dionisio, Danny Florencio, Jimmy Mariano, Adriano Papa, Manny Paner, Abet Guidaben, Rodolfo Segura, Ricardo Cleofas, Ramon Lucindo and Romeo Frank, who replaced the suspended Philip Cezar.

== Champions ==
- First Conference: Toyota Comets
- Second Conference: Toyota Comets
- All-Philippine Championship: Crispa Redmanizers
- Team with best win–loss percentage: Toyota Comets (42–15, .737)
- Best Team of the Year: Toyota Comets (1st)

== Individual awards ==
- Most Valuable Player: Bogs Adornado (Crispa)
- Mythical Five:
  - Francis Arnaiz (Toyota)
  - Atoy Co (Crispa)
  - Manny Paner (Royal)
  - Ernesto Estrada (Royal)
  - Bogs Adornado (Crispa)

== Cumulative standings ==
Team	GP	W	L	PCT
Toyota Comets	57	42	15	.737
Crispa Redmanizers	57	38	19	.667
U/Tex Weavers	49	26	23	.531
Mariwasa-Noritake	40	21	19	.525
Concepcion Carrier	29	13	16	.448
Royal Tru-Orange	56	25	31	.446
Tanduay Distillery	24	6	18	.250
Presto Ice Cream Makers	24	6	18	.250
7-Up Uncolas	24	3	21	.125

Elimination Round (First And Second Conferences)
Team	W	L	PCT
Toyota Comets	19	5	.792
Crispa Redmanizers	18	6	.750
Royal Tru-Orange	16	8	.667
U/Tex Weavers	15	9	.625
Mariwasa-Noritake Porcelainmakers	13	11	.542
Carrier Weathermakers	12	12	.500
Tanduay Distillery	6	18	.250
Presto Ice Cream	6	18	.250
7-Up Uncolas	3	21	.125

== Board of governors ==
- Leopoldo Prieto – Commissioner
- Emerson Coseteng – President (Mariwasa Group)
- Walter Euyang (Universal Textile Mills, Inc.)
- Domingo Itchon (Elizalde and Co., Inc.)
- Leonardo "Skip" Guinto (San Miguel Corporation)
- Jose "Dondo" Lim III (Concepcion Industries, Inc.)
- Enrico Villaflor (Seven-Up Bottling Company of the Philippines)
- Porfirio Zablan (CFC Corporation)
- Pablo Carlos (Delta Motor Corporation)
- Valeriano "Danny" Floro (P. Floro and Sons)

== Notes ==
The first and second conference of the season were officially named as All-Filipino Conference and Open Conference respectively. The first All-Filipino Conference was reclassified as an import-laced tournament since the league gave teams the option to hire foreign players or "imports". Both tournaments were renamed as First and Second Conference based on the records under the "Winners circle over the years" section of the official PBA Annual, Hardcourt, since its 2001 edition.
