= Philippine Basketball Association =

Men's professional basketball league in the Philippines

Philippine Basketball Association (PBA)
- Sport: Basketball
- Founded: April 9, 1975; 51 years ago
- First season: 1975
- Commissioner: Willie Marcial
- Motto: Solid (Note: In some instances, the "Solid" motto may be referred to as "Solid ang Laban" (lit. The Competition/Fight is Solid). The motto changes per season.)
- No. of teams: 13
- Country: Philippines
- Headquarters: Eulogio Rodriguez Jr. Avenue (C-5 road), Eastwood City, Bagumbayan, Quezon City
- Continent: FIBA Asia
- Most recent champions: 2024 Governors' – TNT Tropang Giga; 2025–26 Philippine – San Miguel Beermen; 2026 Commissioner's – Barangay Ginebra San Miguel
- Most titles: San Miguel Beermen (31 titles)
- Broadcasters: RPTV; PBA Rush (HD)
- Streaming partners: Cignal Play; One Sports YouTube Channel
- International cup: East Asia Super League
- Website: pba.ph
- 2026 PBA Governors' Cup; 2025–26 PBA season

The Philippine Basketball Association (PBA) is a men's professional basketball league in the Philippines, composed of twelve company-branded franchise teams. Founded in 1975, it is the first professional basketball league in Asia and the second-oldest in the world after the National Basketball Association (NBA). (Note: The PBA was established as a professional league before the "professional era" of basketball in 1989, when FIBA dropped the distinction between amateurs and professionals. Previously, professionals were not allowed to play in FIBA sanctioned leagues.)

The league played its first game at the Araneta Coliseum in Quezon City on April 9, 1975, and its regulations are a hybrid of rules from the NBA and FIBA. As of the 2022–23 season, the PBA season consists of three tournaments known as "conferences": the Philippine Cup, the Commissioner's Cup, and the Governors' Cup. The Commissioner's and Governors' Cups allow each team to sign a single foreign player known as an "import". Meanwhile, the Philippine Cup is exclusive for Filipino players and is considered the most prestigious of the three conferences. Although the three conferences have minor variations in format and rules, each consists of a single round-robin elimination round followed by playoffs to determine the champion. The winners of the conference cups do not face each other at the end of the season to determine the season champion; instead, each conference champion team are considered PBA champions. The achievement of a team winning all three conferences in a season is called the Grand Slam.

The San Miguel Beermen are the most successful team with a total of 31 championships, including a Grand Slam in 1989. They have also won the most titles in each of the three active conferences: 12 Philippine Cups, 5 Commissioner's Cups, and 5 Governors' Cups. Meanwhile, the defunct Crispa Redmanizers are the only team to have achieved two Grand Slams.

As of 2022–23, the PBA earned ₱200 million in net revenue and had an average television audience of 4 million per game. The PBA also has an official developmental league, the PBA D-League.

== History ==
=== Founding ===
Ms. PBA, Mia Montemayor tosses the ceremonial ball between Mariwasa's Cisco Oliver and Concepcion's Ramon Lucindo during the opening ceremonies of the Philippine Basketball Association on April 9, 1975. Looking on are PBA commissioner Leo Prieto and PBA president Emerson Coseteng.

The first PBA logo primarily used from 1975 to 1988. The logo is currently being used for the league's marketing materials since 2017.

The Philippine Basketball Association was founded when nine teams left the now-defunct Manila Industrial and Commercial Athletic Association (MICAA), which was tightly controlled by the Basketball Association of the Philippines (BAP), the FIBA-recognized national association at the time. With the BAP controlling the MICAA, the league was de jure amateur, as players were only paid allowances. This is much like what was done in other countries to circumvent the amateur requirement and to play in FIBA-sanctioned tournaments such as the Olympics. MICAA team owners were not pleased with how BAP (then led by Gonzalo "Lito" Puyat) were taking away their players to join the national team without consulting them first. On January 23, 1975, Mariwasa-Noritake Porcelainmakers' team owner, Emerson Coseteng, together with Carrier Weathermakers, Toyota Comets, Seven-Up Uncolas and Presto Ice Cream announced the formation of the PBA. The Crispa Redmanizers, Royal Tru-Orange, Tanduay Distillery, and the U/Tex Weavers later joined the upcoming professional league. Leopoldo Prieto, the coach for the Philippines at the 1956 Melbourne Olympics, was appointed as the first commissioner and Coseteng was chosen as the first president of the league's Board of Governors. The first game of the league was held at the Araneta Coliseum on April 9, 1975, featuring Mariwasa-Noritake and Concepcion Carrier with Miss PBA Mia Montemayor conducting the ceremonial ball toss.

=== Early years ===
The league's first 10 years was known for the intense rivalry of the Crispa Redmanizers and the Toyota Tamaraws, still considered one of the greatest rivalries in league history. Big names such as Robert Jaworski, Ramon Fernandez, Francis Arnaiz, Atoy Co, Bogs Adornado and Philip Cezar played for those squads before the two teams disbanded in 1983 and 1984 respectively. Following their disbandment, the league moved from the Araneta Coliseum to ULTRA in Pasig. There, the league continued to be popular, as several former Toyota and Crispa players suited up for different teams.

During the mid to late 1980s, Jaworski and Ginebra San Miguel became the league's most popular squad for their "never say die" attitude. The team had intense rivalries with the Tanduay Rhum Masters, which was led by Jaworski's ex-Toyota teammate-turned-rival Fernandez, and later the expansion Purefoods Corporation and younger players Alvin Patrimonio, Jerry Codiñera, Jojo Lastimosa and Fernandez (who moved from Tanduay). By the end of the 1980s, San Miguel Beer won numerous championships that included the 1989 Grand Slam, led by coach Norman Black and former national team stars Samboy Lim and Hector Calma.

Second PBA logo officially used from 1989 to 1992 (used as secondary logo from 1985 to 1988)

In 1989, FIBA voted to allow professionals to play in their sanctioned tournaments, hence the PBA's players are now able to represent the country internationally. In 1990, the league sent its first all-professional squad to the Asian Games, earning a silver medal. The PBA would later send three more all-pro squads to the event.

The early 1990s saw Ginebra and Shell forming an intense rivalry that included Ginebra's walkout in 1990 finals against Shell and the team's dramatic comeback from a 3–1 deficit to beat Shell in the 1991 First Conference. Patrimonio, Allan Caidic, and a host of others became the league's main attraction. By 1993, the league moved to the Cuneta Astrodome in Pasay and later saw the Alaska Milkmen win the 1996 grand slam and nine titles in the decade.

=== Competition and scheduling changes ===
From 1999 to 2000, the PBA endured controversy. Several expatriate cagers arrived on the scene (such as Asi Taulava, Danny Seigle and Eric Menk). Their lineage was questionable and most of them were deported for falsifying documents. The arrival of dozens of these players was a counter to the fledgling Metropolitan Basketball Association, a regional-based professional league formed in 1998. After ABS-CBN's 2001 abandonment, the MBA faced mounting expenses and would fold within a year. Despite the MBA's disbandment and the arrival of those players to the PBA, attendance went sour for the PBA in 2002 and was even worse the following year.

In 2004, the league introduced drastic scheduling changes, when it decided to begin the season in October instead of January. The change in starting the season allowed the league to accommodate international tournaments held from June to September and it fit better with college hoops, the NCAA and the UAAP, whose seasons run from June to October. The league also reduced the number of conferences from three to two, renaming the All-Filipino Cup as the Philippine Cup and introducing a new import laden tournament named as the Fiesta Conference. To accommodate these changes, a transitional tournament, the 2004 PBA Fiesta Conference was held from February to July, which was won by the Barangay Ginebra Kings. The league also began to hold the annual All-Star weekend in the provinces, alternating from Luzon and Visayas/Mindanao provinces every year.

The league regained some popularity by this year, thanks in large part to Barangay Ginebra's three PBA championships led by Eric Menk, Jayjay Helterbrand and Mark Caguioa. Solid marketing and arrival of collegiate stars from the UAAP and the NCAA also worked in the PBA's favor.

By 2005, the league would take on the role of Philippine national representation under Chot Reyes, when FIBA lifted the suspension of the country following the formation of the Samahang Basketbol ng Pilipinas despite a ninth-place finish in the 2007 FIBA Asia Championship. In 2009, however, the all-amateur Smart Gilas team became the country's official representative in international competitions. The PBA's role in forming a national team was thus reduced to sending up reinforcements to beef up the national squad.

=== Modern era and expansion ===
After the appointment of Chito Salud, son of former commissioner Rudy Salud as the commissioner of the PBA, the league returned the three-conference format starting in the 2010–11 season. This also ushered the return of the previously retired conferences, the Commissioner's and Governors' cups.

The beginning of the 2010s also saw the dominance of the Talk 'N Text Tropang Texters, who nearly got the Grand Slam in the 2010–11 season and won the Philippine Cup in three consecutive years (2010–11, 2011–12, 2012–13) enabling them to permanently keep possession of the Jun Bernardino Trophy, the trophy given to the Philippine Cup champions.

On May 19, 2013, the third game of the PBA Commissioner's Cup Finals between the Alaska Aces and the Barangay Ginebra San Miguel set the all-time basketball attendance record of 23,436 at the Smart Araneta Coliseum, which broke the previous record of 23,108 set 11 days earlier that featured the semifinals series doubleheader between Alaska vs. San Mig Coffee and Barangay Ginebra vs. Talk 'N Text. This record was eventually broken on February 12, 2014, when the seventh game of the 2013–14 PBA Philippine Cup Semifinals series between Barangay Ginebra San Miguel and San Mig Super Coffee Mixers set the all-time basketball attendance record of 24,883.

The 2013–14 season became historic as the San Mig Super Coffee Mixers became the fourth team to win the Grand Slam. Tim Cone, the coach of the Coffee Mixers also made history when he became the first coach to win two Grand Slams.

For the 2014–15 season, the league expanded to twelve teams, after accepting two new franchises: Kia Sorento and Blackwater Elite. The league held its opening ceremonies at the Philippine Arena and set an all-time Philippine basketball attendance record of 52,612. This record was eventually broken during the Game 7 of the 2022–23 Commissioner's Cup Finals, contested between the Barangay Ginebra San Miguel and guest team Bay Area Dragons, which was also held in the Philippine Arena with an attendance of 54,589.

On February 15, 2015, in the middle of the 2014–15 PBA season, commissioner Chito Salud announced that he would step down as the league's commissioner and was succeeded by Chito Narvasa starting the 2015–16 PBA season. Salud was then appointed as the president and CEO of the league, when the board of governors decided to restructure the league and create the president and CEO position to manage the league's marketing, expansion and business-related matters. The commissioner (who will also be the league's chief operating officer) will handle game-related matters.

Salud, however, also stepped down as the league's president and CEO on December 31, 2015, and was replaced by incumbent PBA chairman Robert Non. The board of governors later appointed Chito Narvasa as the president and CEO. The said position was eventually dissolved before the start of the 2016 Governors' Cup.

Amid controversies during his term, Narvasa stepped down on December 31, 2017. The board appointed Media Bureau chief Willie Marcial as his replacement on January 25, 2018.

=== PBA bubble and declining attendance ===
Upon the onset of the COVID-19 pandemic in March 2020, the league was forced to postpone their games for the 2020 season just three days after holding their opening ceremonies. It is not until October that the league was able to resume the Philippine Cup at Angeles, Pampanga in a bubble setup. This was the first time that the league held only one tournament in a season.

The opening of the 2021 season was planned to open in January 2021 but was also delayed to July 2021 due to the rising cases of COVID-19 caused by the virus' Delta variant. The games were initially played at the Ynares Sports Arena in Pasig in a semi-bubble type setup but due to another case surge in Metro Manila in August, the games were moved to the Don Honorio Ventura State University in Bacolor, Pampanga. The 2021 Governors' Cup started in December in a semi-bubble type setup at the Ynares Sports Arena in Pasig. After two weeks, the Quezon City government approved the league's proposal to play their games with a limited number of audience at the Smart Araneta Coliseum. The league postponed indefinitely the scheduled games for January 2022 due to the increasing number of COVID-19 cases brought by the Omicron variant.

On February 16, 2022, Alaska Milk Corporation which owned the Alaska Aces announced that the team would leave the PBA at the end of the 2021 Governors' Cup after 35 years in the league and winning 14 championships. Alaska played their last game on March 19, 2022, with a loss to the NLEX Road Warriors in the quarterfinals. A ceremony was held shortly after the game to mark the Alaska's departure from the PBA. The team was later sold to Converge ICT, to which it was named Converge FiberXers.

The league's modern history is noted for its declining attendance, despite still pulling high television viewership. Journalists, team owners, and coaches have noted the dominance of SMC/RSA and MVP teams as a potential reason, with some calling for parity in the league. The low attendance has also been compared to the high figures of collegiate and professional volleyball in the country. The Samahang Basketbol ng Pilipinas has since stated that they will help address these concerns.

== Teams ==
All franchises are owned by corporations since the league's inception in 1975, being the successor of the Manila Industrial and Commercial Athletic Association, an amateur league which also featured corporate teams. They are not based on geographic locale, so they do not play in a home arena.

A team's name is often divided into two parts; the first is the company or brand name, then the product or a moniker – usually connected to the business of the company. In some cases, the brand name and the moniker can be fused. For example, the San Miguel Beermen is a team owned by the San Miguel Brewery of the San Miguel Corporation, makers of the popular San Miguel Beer brand. The names of the teams often changes, often depending on what product or service the owners like to advertise. A name change could be drastic, to the point of switching industries entirely, such as in the case of the Pepsi Mega Bottlers which changed their names to the Mobiline Cellulars (now TNT Tropang 5G).

Overview of PBA teams
Team	Company	Colors	Founded	Joined	Titles	Head coach
Barangay Ginebra San Miguel	Ginebra San Miguel, Inc. (Note: Denotes a San Miguel Corporation subsidiary)		1979		16	Tim Cone
Blackwater Bossing	Ever Bilena Cosmetics, Inc.		2006	2014	0	Patrick Aquino (interim)
Converge FiberXers	Converge ICT Solutions, Inc.		2022		0	Dennis Pineda
Magnolia Chicken Timplados Hotshots	San Miguel Food and Beverage		1986	1988	14	LA Tenorio
Meralco Bolts	Manila Electric Company (Note: Denotes a team owned by Manny Pangilinan)		1968	2010	1	Luigi Trillo
NLEX Road Warriors	NLEX Corporation		2011	2014	0	Jimmy Alapag
Phoenix Super LPG Fuel Masters	Phoenix Petroleum Philippines, Inc.		2016		0	Charles Tiu
Rain or Shine Elasto Painters	Asian Coatings Philippines, Inc.		1996	2006	2	Yeng Guiao
San Miguel Beermen	San Miguel Brewery, Inc.		1938	1975 (Note: The San Miguel franchise took a leave of absence on the first two conferences of the 1986 season.)	31	Leo Austria
Terrafirma Dyip	Terrafirma Realty Development Corporation		2014		0	Ronald Tubid
Titan Ultra Giant Risers	Pureblends Corporation		2016	2025	0	Rensy Bajar
TNT Tropang 5G	Smart Communications		1990		11	Chot Reyes

=== Team popularity ===
In 2008, a survey by the Social Weather Stations showed that Purefoods shares the honor of the league's most popular team along with Barangay Ginebra. It appeared that Ginebra was the most popular team among men, while Purefoods was the most popular among women. Also, Ginebra was more popular in Metro Manila and Luzon and in classes ABC, while Purefoods was more popular in Visayas and Mindanao and in class D. The two teams were tied for most supporters in class E. In terms of percentage of supporters, the survey showed that, after Ginebra and Purefoods (which both got 31%), are San Miguel Beermen (21%), Alaska (13%), Sta. Lucia (5%), Red Bull (4%), Talk N' Text (3%), Coca-Cola (1%), and Air 21 (1%). Notably, the top three teams that have the most supporters have also been considered the most talent-laden teams. They also fall under the San Miguel Corporation umbrella.

=== Team rivalries ===
The most famous matchup was the Crispa-Toyota rivalry of the 1970s. Fans faithfully supported their favorite squads and appeared in the multitudes at the Araneta Coliseum, or wherever the archrivals had met. In those days, the players were very passionate. On one occasion, they engaged in a major brawl, leading to the arrest and detention of several players from both clubs at Fort Bonifacio.

The most heated rivalry in the PBA today is that of two teams representing the Ginebra franchise and the Purefoods franchise. The rivalry is now commonly known as the Manila Clasico. It traces its roots on the original Añejo–Purefoods rivalry of the late 1980s to early 1990s.

Other intense and/or short-lived rivalries include:

- Ginebra vs. Tanduay (1986–1987 rivalry)
- Ginebra–Shell rivalry (1990s rivalry)
- Purefoods–Swift (1990s corporate rivalry)
- Magnolia franchise vs. San Miguel franchise (late-1980s–present)
- Barangay Ginebra vs. San Miguel (late-1980s–present)
- Alaska/Hills Bros. vs. Barangay Ginebra (late-1980s–2022)
- Alaska vs. Purefoods (late-1980s–2022)
- Alaska–San Miguel (late 1980s–2022)
- Red Bull vs. the SMC franchises (Barangay Ginebra, San Miguel and Purefoods, 2000–2008)
- Barangay Ginebra–TNT rivalry (late-1990s–present, "Royal Rivalry")
- Magnolia vs. Rain or Shine (2009–present, "New Age Rivalry or Kontrapelo")
- San Miguel–TNT rivalry (2010–present, "Bad Blood")
- Barangay Ginebra–Meralco rivalry (2016–present)

== Arenas ==
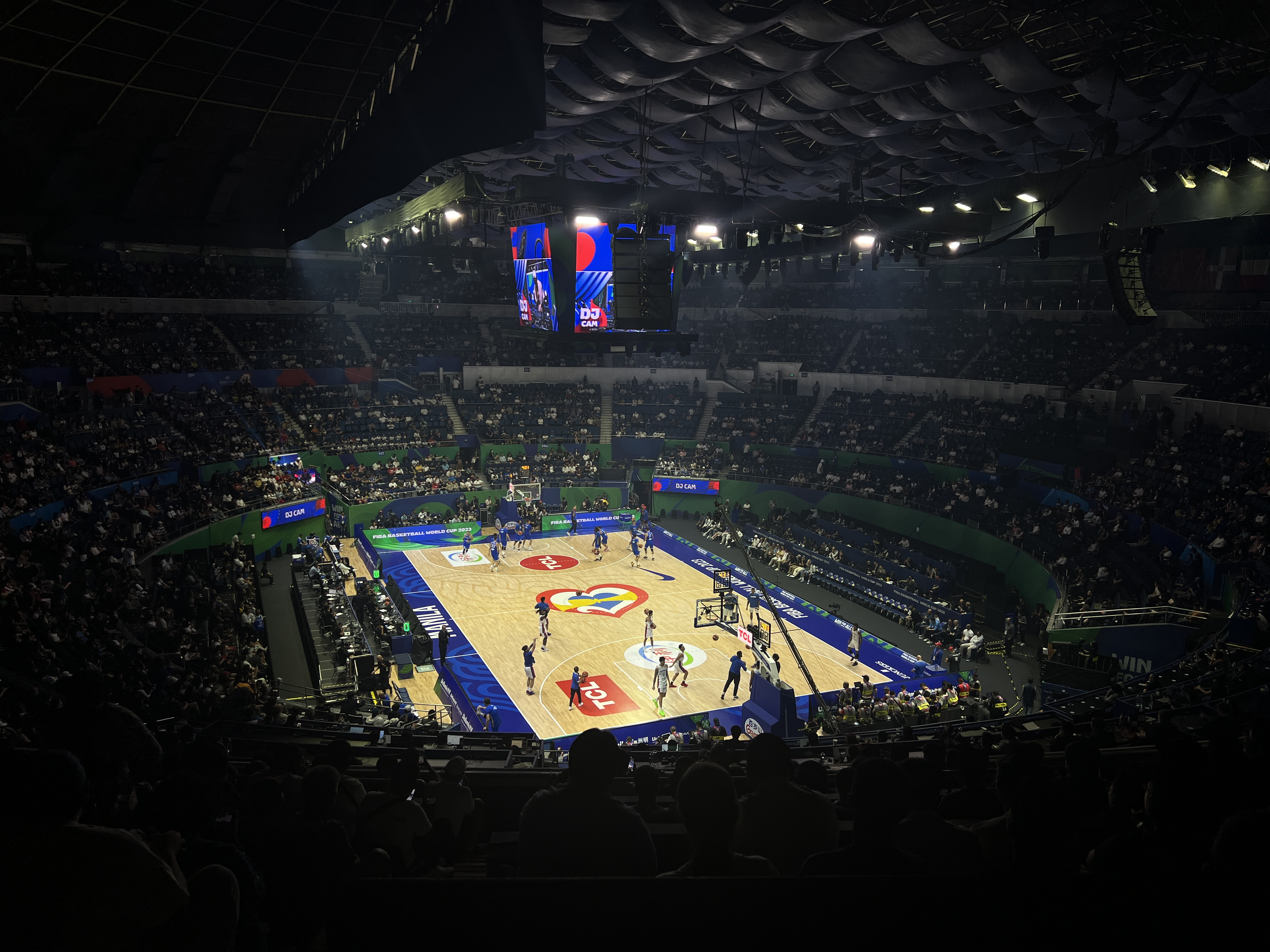
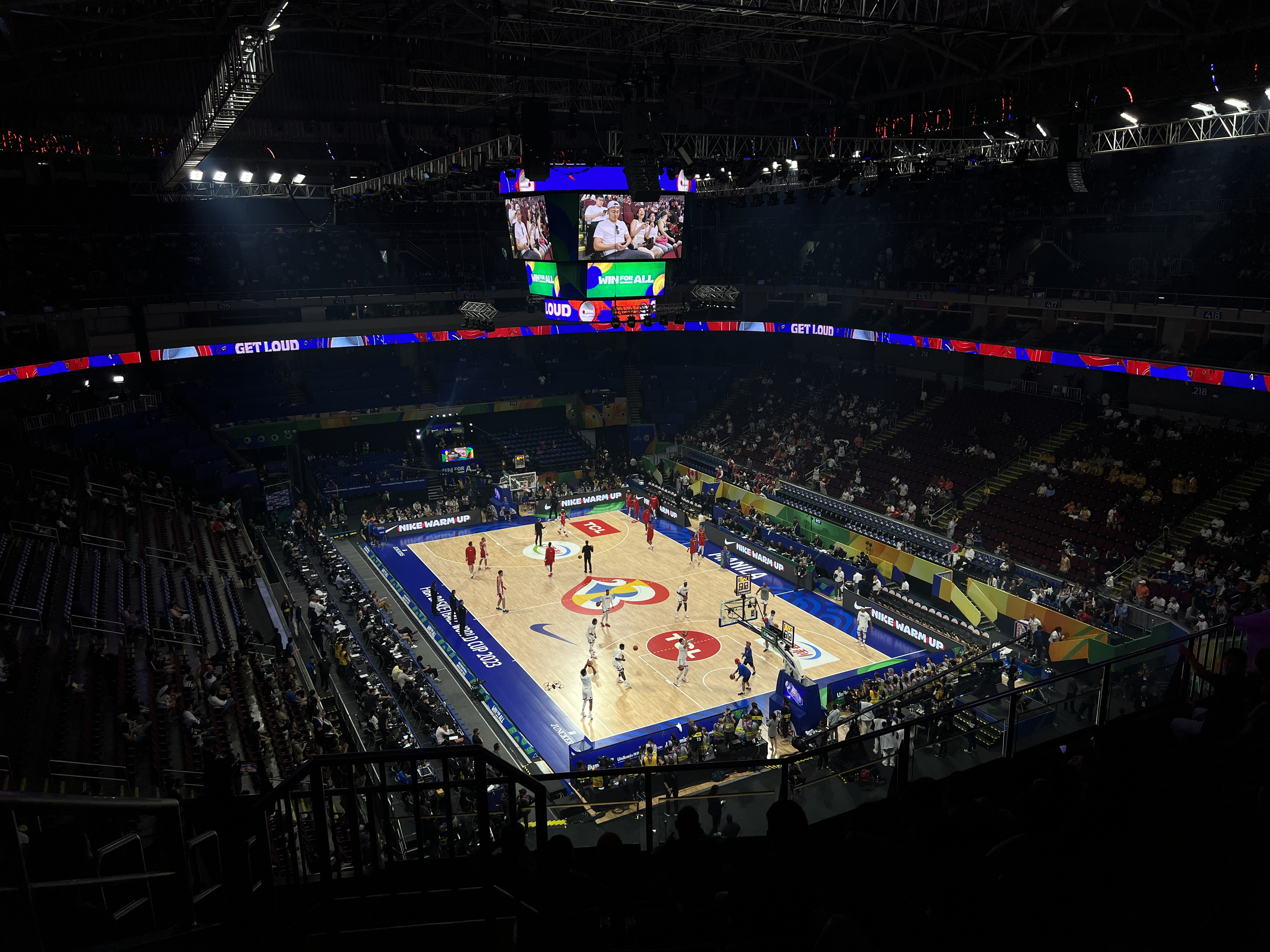
The Smart Araneta Coliseum and the SM Mall of Asia Arena, two of the main playing venues of the PBA

As teams do not represent geographic locales, the league itself rents venues for games. The PBA usually plays a doubleheader three times a week at the arenas in Metro Manila, and a game on Saturdays at the provinces, popularly known as "out-of-town" games.

The majority of games are at the Araneta Coliseum in Quezon City and the SM Mall of Asia Arena in Pasay. When both arenas are unavailable, the alternate venues are the Ynares Center in Antipolo, Rizal, PhilSports Arena in Pasig, and the Filoil EcoOil Centre in San Juan. Occasionally, provincial games are hosted in selected venues throughout the country. Playoff games are usually held at venues in Metro Manila, most often at the Araneta Coliseum. However, recent incentives to promote the league throughout the country have resulted in out-of-town playoff games.

The league has also a planned to have a regular season games in the newly open state of the art SM Arena Seaside Cebu. This will be the first regular games that will be played outside of metro manila.

The league has also played several times outside the Philippines, the majority in Dubai where there is a large Filipino community.

Likewise the PBA had plans to construct its own indoor arena as early as 2007. The most recent plan is in 2024, with the league looking to build a venue in Metro Manila.

== Competition format ==
=== Selection of teams ===
When the PBA was created, it was from the nine clubs representing different companies that seceded from the Manila Industrial and Commercial Athletic Association (MICAA). The PBA adopted the MICAA's "franchise system" akin to North American sports, only that instead of geographic regions, teams represent companies. Several teams have disbanded and entered the league. Disbandment of a team usually occurs if its mother company regularly sustains financial losses, or for non-sporting reasons, causing it to sell the team to another company. Aside from buying an already-existing team, a company can enter the PBA via an expansion team.

An aspiring team seeking to join the PBA had to be approved by majority of the existing teams. There is a lockout provision, which enables a team to veto the entry of a franchise team whose company is a direct competitor that of one of the existing team's business.

Previously, a company is allowed only one team, with each team having one vote in the Board of Governors; with the acquisition of La Tondeña Distillers (now Ginebra San Miguel) by the San Miguel Corporation (SMC) in 1987, this caused the SMC to have two "sister" teams: the San Miguel Beermen and the Ginebra San Miguel (now the Barangay Ginebra San Miguel). At this point, Ginebra coach Robert Jaworski had autonomy on the decisions on his team, so the situation of SMC having sister teams was tolerated. In 1998, Jaworski ran and won for a Senate seat; this caused him to delegate coaching duties to his longtime deputy Rino Salazar. By this time, Danding Cojuangco has seized control of SMC, and he added Allan Caidic to Ginebra from San Miguel. Jaworski disapproved of this, and resigned.

In 2001 the Ayala Corporation sold its Purefoods-Hormel unit, which included the Purefoods TJ Hotdogs team, to SMC. Later that year, RFM Corporation sold its Cosmos Bottling Corporation, including the Pop Cola Panthers team, to Coca-Cola Bottlers Philippines, a subsidiary of SMC, rechristening them as the Coca-Cola Tigers, and giving SMC four teams. The PBA approved this arrangement, with SMC getting two votes in the Board of Governors instead of four. In 2006, SMC sold back its Coca-Cola unit to the Atlanta-based Coca-Cola Company, and sold the now renamed Powerade Tigers to Sultan 900, Inc., becoming the GlobalPort Batang Pier, decreasing their teams to three.

By 2010, Manuel V. Pangilinan has owned the Talk 'N Text Phone Pals team via the Pilipino Telephone Company. Pangilinan, who had controlling ownership in Meralco, bought the Sta. Lucia Realtors team, rechristening them as the Meralco Bolts. His NLEX Corporation then bought the Air21 Express team in 2014, becoming the NLEX Road Warriors. This has made Cojuangco and Pangilinan own three teams each out of the 12 teams in the PBA by 2014.

This closed system, while unlike the open European model of promotion and relegation, allows teams from other leagues to carryover some of players to the PBA, if they are given this concession, such as in 2006 when the Welcoat Dragons were allowed to carry over three players from their Philippine Basketball League team.

The PBA also allows "guest teams", or teams not represented in the Board of Governors, to play in certain conferences. The most recent guest team is the now-defunct Bay Area Dragons, who took part in the 2022–23 PBA Commissioner's Cup.

=== Season format ===
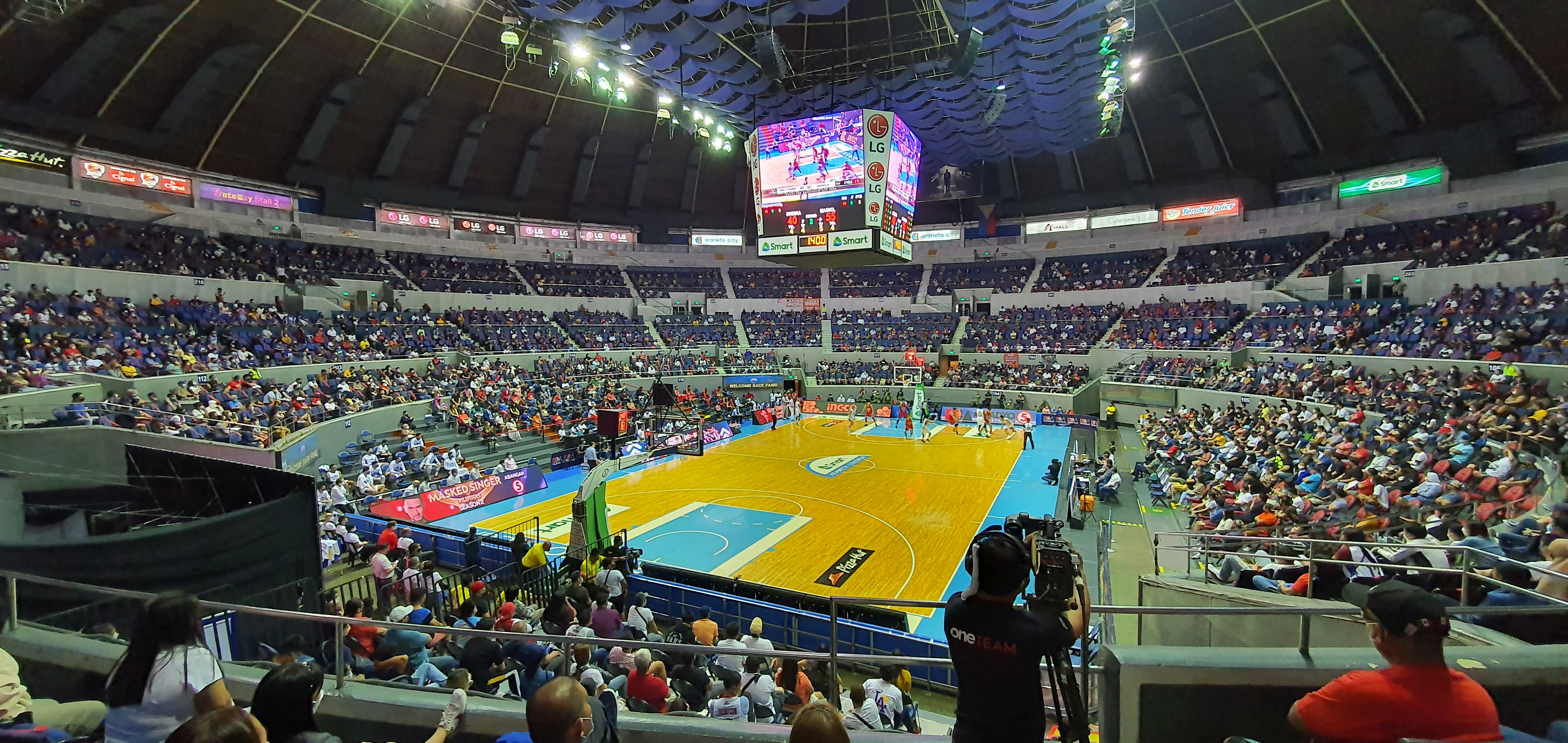
A photo inside the Smart Araneta Coliseum during the 2021 PBA Governors' elimination round game between the Barangay Ginebra San Miguel and the Magnolia Pambansang Manok Hotshots. This is the first time that the two teams played with a live audience since the COVID-19 pandemic began in March 2020.

Since the 2010–11 season, three conferences are usually held. Unlike in most leagues where a "conference" refers to the grouping of teams based on historical or geographical context, PBA conferences are tournaments each consisting of an elimination round and playoffs, similar to the Apertura and Clausura format in Latin American football. There may be fewer conferences in a season, such as the 2020 and 2021 seasons having one and two conferences, respectively, due to the COVID-19 pandemic. The three conferences are the Philippine Cup, Commissioner's Cup and Governors' Cup, with the Philippine Cup being considered the most prestigious of the three. The season begins with an opening ceremony consisting of the presentation of the team's roster and their respective muses followed by the Leo Awards, the league's awarding ceremony, all before the start of the first game of the season.

The Philippine and Commissioner's Cups begin with a single round-robin elimination round, where every team plays against each other once with the top eight teams advancing to the playoffs while the rest are eliminated. The Governors' Cup splits the teams into a two groups that will play in a double round-robin with the top four from each group advancing to the playoffs. The format of the playoffs depends on the conference being held and has varied over the years. The Finals, regardless of conference, is a best-of-seven series to determine the conference champion. Previous conferences featured a group stage where teams play against their group opponents twice or a second elimination round for the top teams serving as the conference semifinals. The conference champions don't meet at the end of the season to determine an overall champion, instead, all of them are declared league champions. If a single team manages to win every conference in a single season, the team earns the rare distinction of being a Grand Slam champion. At the end of the conference, the league holds an awarding ceremony to honor the best players of the conference.

Once the season concludes, the league holds its rookie draft. Most draft applicants have played in the collegiate ranks (either in the Philippines or the United States), the PBA D-League, or in other domestic and international leagues. The off-season usually lasts a couple of months before the next season begins. In some cases, there may be a mid-season break to give way for players who are members of the Philippine national team to play in FIBA tournaments, as such the season may be lengthened. There have been calls from within the league to revert to the two-conference format used from 2004 to 2010 to shorten the season and have it in sync with the FIBA calendar again.

=== Game rules ===
The PBA uses its own rules for its games, independent from FIBA or the NBA. Most non-professional leagues in the Philippines primarily use FIBA rules, so called "amateur rules", although recent professional leagues, such as the MPBL and PSL, have used FIBA rules for its games. The Games and Amusements Board (GAB) has its rules for the size of the basketball court and equipment, which the PBA adapts.

Game rules have previously been predominantly influenced by the NBA, such as the rules on illegal defenses. After PBA players have been allowed to represent the Philippines in FIBA tournaments, the league adopted a portion of the FIBA rules, including allowing zone defenses, so that the Philippine national team will not be disadvantaged in FIBA competitions.

The PBA implemented a four-point shot, 27 feet from the basket, for its regular-season and playoff games, starting in its 49th season in 2024–25.

Rule differences between FIBA, PBA, and NBA
Rule	FIBA	PBA	NBA
Tournament classification	Tournament points	Winning percentage	
Length of quarters/periods	10 minutes	12 minutes	
Maximum personal fouls before disqualification	5 personal fouls	6 personal fouls	
Defensive three seconds	No		Yes
Goaltending	Can touch the ball while on the rim		Cannot touch the ball within the rim or on the imaginary cylinder above the rim
Jump ball situation	No; alternating possession between teams		Yes
Three-point line	0.9 meters (2 feet, 11 inches) from sideline, 6.6 meters (21 feet, 8 inches)	3 feet from sideline, 22 feet. Four-point shot, 27 feet.	3 feet from sideline, 23 feet and 9 inches
Team foul penalty (bonus)	4th foul in a quarter, overtime periods included in allocation of fouls from 4th quarter	5th foul in a quarter, 4th foul in every overtime period	
Players calling time outs	No; coaches only		Yes

=== Player eligibility ===
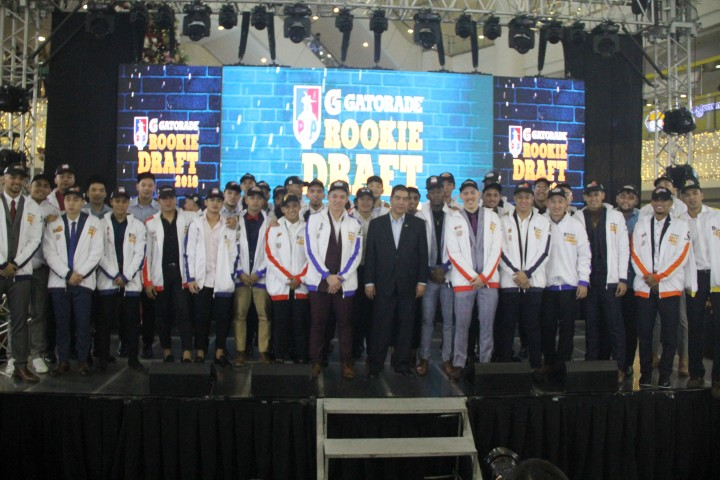
The 2018 iteration of the PBA Draft.

Eligibility to participate in the PBA is generally limited to natural born Filipino citizens born in the Philippines. There are player quotas for natural born Filipinos born outside the Philippines, while naturalized Filipinos and foreigners can only play in certain conferences. Coaching is restricted to Filipinos, although longtime foreigner residents and holders of certain visas have been granted exemptions.

Natural-born Filipino citizens are generally eligible to become part of a PBA team through the PBA draft. Foreigners as well as naturalized Filipino citizens with no Filipino parents can not join the league through the PBA draft; both who could only play as imports, and only on certain conferences.

Filipino players who are aspiring to join the PBA through the draft and are born outside the Philippines are classed as Filipino-foreigners regardless if both their parents are Filipino citizens at the time of their birth. They have to submit documentary proof of their Filipino citizenship from the Department of Justice and the Bureau of Immigration prior to their rookie draft. Filipinos with foreign ancestry who are born in the Philippines are not subject to the same requirements. A team can have a maximum of five Filipino-foreigners players in its roster. Starting the draft for the 2022 season, the Filipino-foreigner cap was increased to seven. Filipino-foreigners would only need a passport and be of Filipino heritage.

Foreigners and naturalized Filipinos can play as imports, but only on import-laden conferences. If a player who is not a natural-born Filipino plays in an all-Filipino conference, it can lead his team forfeiting the wins in games where he took part. Imports are directly hired by teams, and are not drafted. In some conferences where imports are allowed, a height limit is imposed. An import who is over the height limit will not be allowed to play. Most imports are African Americans, but there had been tournaments where other nationalities have played in.

=== Coach eligibility ===
Head coaching role for teams in the PBA is generally only available to Filipino citizens since foreigners who are classified as non-resident aliens are barred from serving the role as head coach. It is possible for a foreigner to be a head coach of a PBA team by acquiring permanent residency such as in the case of Tim Cone and Norman Black who married Filipinos and being a holder of a Special Resident Retiree's Visa (SRRV) such as in the case of Rajko Toroman who became eligible for an SRRV after residing in the country for at least five years. The restriction on foreigners has been in place since 1991.

=== Other regulations ===
Players of the PBA sign a Uniform Players' Contract (UPC) when they sign in with a team franchise which plays in the league. The team manager of the concerned team also signs this contract. The UPC includes the bill of rights and privileges as well as obligations and responsibilities of the PBA's players and teams. Players under an active UPC cannot transfer to a team outside the PBA. Consequentially, this prohibits players from taking part in a league other than the PBA (also known colloquially as ligang labas or "outside league"). Although occasionally, players are allowed to temporarily suit up in such games if they secure permission from both their teams and the league management, especially for participations involving charity.

== Honors ==
=== Championships ===
Team	Titles	2nd places	Winning conferences
San Miguel Beermen	31	16	1979 Open, 1982 Invitational, 1987 Reinforced, 1988 Open, 1988 Reinforced, 1989 Open, 1989 All-Filipino, 1989 Reinforced, 1992 All-Filipino, 1993 Governors', 1994 All-Filipino, 1999 Commissioner's, 1999 Governors', 2000 Commissioner's, 2000 Governors', 2001 All-Filipino, 2005 Fiesta, 2009 Fiesta, 2011 Governors', 2014–15 Philippine, 2015 Governors', 2015–16 Philippine, 2016–17 Philippine, 2017 Commissioner's, 2017–18 Philippine, 2019 Philippine, 2019 Commissioner's, 2022 Philippine, 2023–24 Commissioner's, 2025 Philippine, 2025–26 Philippine
Barangay Ginebra San Miguel	16	17	1986 Open, 1988 All-Filipino, 1991 First, 1997 Commissioner's, 2004 Fiesta, 2004–05 Philippine, 2006–07 Philippine, 2008 Fiesta, 2016 Governors', 2017 Governors', 2018 Commissioner's, 2019 Governors', 2020 Philippine, 2021 Governors', 2022–23 Commissioner's, 2026 Commissioner's
Alaska Aces (Note: Defunct franchise)	14	17	1991 Third, 1994 Governors', 1995 Governors', 1996 All-Filipino, 1996 Commissioner's, 1996 Governors', 1997 Governors', 1998 All-Filipino, 1998 Commissioner's, 2000 All-Filipino, 2003 Invitational, 2007 Fiesta, 2010 Fiesta, 2013 Commissioner's
Magnolia Chicken Timplados Hotshots	14	18	1990 Third, 1991 All-Filipino, 1993 All-Filipino, 1994 Commissioner's, 1997 All-Filipino, 2002 Governors', 2006 Philippine, 2009–10 Philippine, 2012 Commissioner's, 2013 Governors', 2013–14 Philippine, 2014 Commissioner's, 2014 Governors', 2018 Governors'
Crispa Redmanizers	13	7	1975 All-Philippine, 1976 First, 1976 Second, 1976 All-Philippine, 1977 All-Filipino, 1977 Open, 1979 All-Filipino, 1980 All-Filipino, 1981 Reinforced Filipino, 1983 All-Filipino, 1983 Reinforced Filipino, 1983 Open, 1984 First All-Filipino
TNT Tropang 5G	11	14	2003 All-Filipino, 2008–09 Philippine, 2010–11 Philippine, 2011 Commissioner's, 2011–12 Philippine, 2012–13 Philippine, 2015 Commissioner's, 2021 Philippine, 2023 Governors', 2024 Governors', 2024–25 Commissioner's
Toyota Super Corollas	9	9	1975 First, 1975 Second, 1977 Invitational, 1978 All-Filipino, 1978 Invitational, 1979 Invitational, 1981 Open, 1982 Reinforced Filipino, 1982 Open
Great Taste Coffee Makers	6	4	1984 Second All-Filipino, 1984 Invitational, 1985 Open, 1985 All-Filipino, 1987 All-Filipino, 1990 All-Filipino
Shell Turbo Chargers	4	5	1990 First, 1992 First, 1998 Governors', 1999 All-Filipino
Pop Cola Panthers	4	3	1992 Third, 1993 Commissioner's, 1995 All-Filipino, 1995 Commissioner's
Barako Bull Energy Boosters	3	2	2001 Commissioner's, 2002 Commissioner's, 2005–06 Fiesta
Tanduay Rhum Masters	3	2	1986 Reinforced, 1986 All-Filipino, 1987 Open
Rain or Shine Elasto Painters	2	4	2012 Governors', 2016 Commissioner's
Powerade Tigers	2	3	2002 All-Filipino, 2003 Reinforced
U/Tex Wranglers	2	2	1978 Open, 1980 Open
Sta. Lucia Realtors	2	1	2001 Governors', 2007–08 Philippine
Meralco Bolts	1	4	2024 Philippine
Northern Consolidated Cement (Note: Guest team)	1	0	1985 Reinforced
Nicholas Stoodley	1	0	1980 Invitational

=== Awards ===
The league awards outstanding Filipino players of the season in the annual Leo Awards. The awards include the Most Valuable Player and the Rookie of the Year. At the end of each conference, the league also awards the Best Player of the Conference for Filipinos and the Bobby Parks Best Import for foreigners.

The PBA Hall of Fame was instituted in 2005 during the 30th anniversary celebration of the league.

=== Records ===
There are all-time records written in Philippine Basketball Association records, as well as distinctions like the PBA career scoring leaders, PBA 2,000 Assists Club, PBA 500 Three-Points Club, PBA 600 Most Games Club, and PBA Top 40 Rebounders. Unlike other leagues, the PBA records of individual players combine both elimination round and playoff round statistics instead of placing them in separate categories.

== Media coverage ==
The PBA has been covered by television networks and other media companies since its opening day. One Sports is their current television partner. Games are being aired on live television via One Sports and PBA Rush, with livestreaming via Cignal Play, One Sports YouTube channel, Pilipinas Live app (worldwide), and Smart LiveStream. Following their departure from TV5, the PBA games are currently broadcast on RPTV.

=== 1975–1999 ===
The PBA's first broadcast partner was Banahaw Broadcasting Corporation (BBC) in 1975. Government Television (GTV) broadcast the PBA in 1976 before moved to Kanlaon Broadcasting System (KBS; now known as Radio Philippines Network or RPN) in 1977. This is then followed by a four-year stint and moved back to Government Television (GTV), later renamed to Maharlika Broadcasting System (MBS) in 1980, which lasted from 1978 until 1981.

In 1982, the league awarded the broadcast rights to Vintage Enterprises, Inc. to produce the broadcasts for various television networks under the network's Vintage Sports brand. The PBA on Vintage Sports was first aired on BBC in 1982 and 1983. This is then followed by MBS, later renamed to People's Television Network (PTV), from 1984 until 1995. Vintage's last stint came with the Intercontinental Broadcasting Corporation (IBC), which broadcast the PBA from 1996 until 1999. In 1997 and 1998, ESPN Asia also aired PBA games in a "parallel broadcast".

=== 2000–2011 ===
Vintage would go on to be acquired by Viva Entertainment in 1999. From 2000 until 2002, PBA games were aired under the PBA on Viva TV branding but remained on IBC. IBC would then join forces with the National Broadcasting Network (NBN; PTV's previous identity from 2001 to 2011) in 2003, but the former would drop out the same year in October.

For the 2004–05 season, the PBA awarded the broadcast rights to the Associated Broadcasting Company (ABC), which would go on to become what is now known as TV5 in August 2008. The 2007–08 season would also be the last season of ABC/TV5's first stint with the league. Solar Entertainment Corporation then won a bid for the league's broadcasting rights, which saw the network split the games between C/S 9 (later renamed to Solar TV and Basketball TV). In February 2011, Solar was looking to find a new broadcast partner, thus for the remainder of its contract, ABS-CBN's sister channel Studio 23 (later ABS-CBN Sports and Action from 2014 to 2020) would be broadcasting the two remaining conferences of the 2010–11 season.

=== 2011–present ===
After the expiration of Solar's contract, TV5 became the league's broadcast partner once again. It first began under the AKTV programming block of IBC in the 2011–12 season and would run until the 2013 Commissioner's Cup due to the expiration of a blocktime agreement between MediaQuest Holdings (owner of TV5) and IBC. Although IBC would go on to also broadcast the 2013 Governors' Cup with TV5 broadcasting the Finals of both Commissioner's and Governors' Cups. AksyonTV simulcasted TV5's coverage for the 2013–14 and 2014–15 seasons, followed by Hyper beginning in January 2016 and ending with the 2016 Commissioner's Cup. From 2013 until 2016, select games were also simulcasted on Fox Sports Asia.

Shortly after the opening of the 2016 Governors' Cup, PBA Rush was launched, which is a PBA-dedicated cable channel that features game simulcasts and replays as well as its own dedicated programming. Sports5 then partnered with ESPN to broadcast games on the newly created ESPN5 channel ahead of the 2017 Governors' Cup Finals.

Beginning with the 2023–24 season, TV5 has partnered up with multiple networks to broadcast the PBA games as TV5 President Guido Zaballero stated that the channel began shifting its focus on entertainment and news programs such as the Korean dramas Revolutionary Love and Diary of a Prosecutor. The PBA entered into an acquired agreement with ZOE Broadcasting Network and ABS-CBN Corporation to air the league's games on A2Z starting November 5, 2023, until February 11, 2024. TV5 Network, Inc. entered into an acquired agreement with Nine Media Corporation (NMC) to broadcast the selected PBA games on CNN Philippines every Saturday and Sunday beginning in January 2024, a deal that was cut short due to the network's shut at the end of that month.

==== Current broadcasters ====
ESPN5 would be renamed to its current form One Sports for the PBA's 2020 season, giving the league its own current branding, PBA on One Sports. Following the shut down of CNN Philippines at the end of January, RPTV took over all live broadcasts, weekdays and weekends, beginning in February.

=== Streaming and radio ===
TV5's stint brought the PBA into the streaming scene. The PBA games can be viewed on One Sports YouTube channel, Cignal Play and Pilipinas Live. The worldwide broadcast for PBA on TV5 is also aired on Kapatid Channel and AksyonTV International. Radio broadcast are being aired on Radyo Pilipinas 2 (DZSR) selected provincial stations of the Presidential Broadcasting Service.

== Administration ==
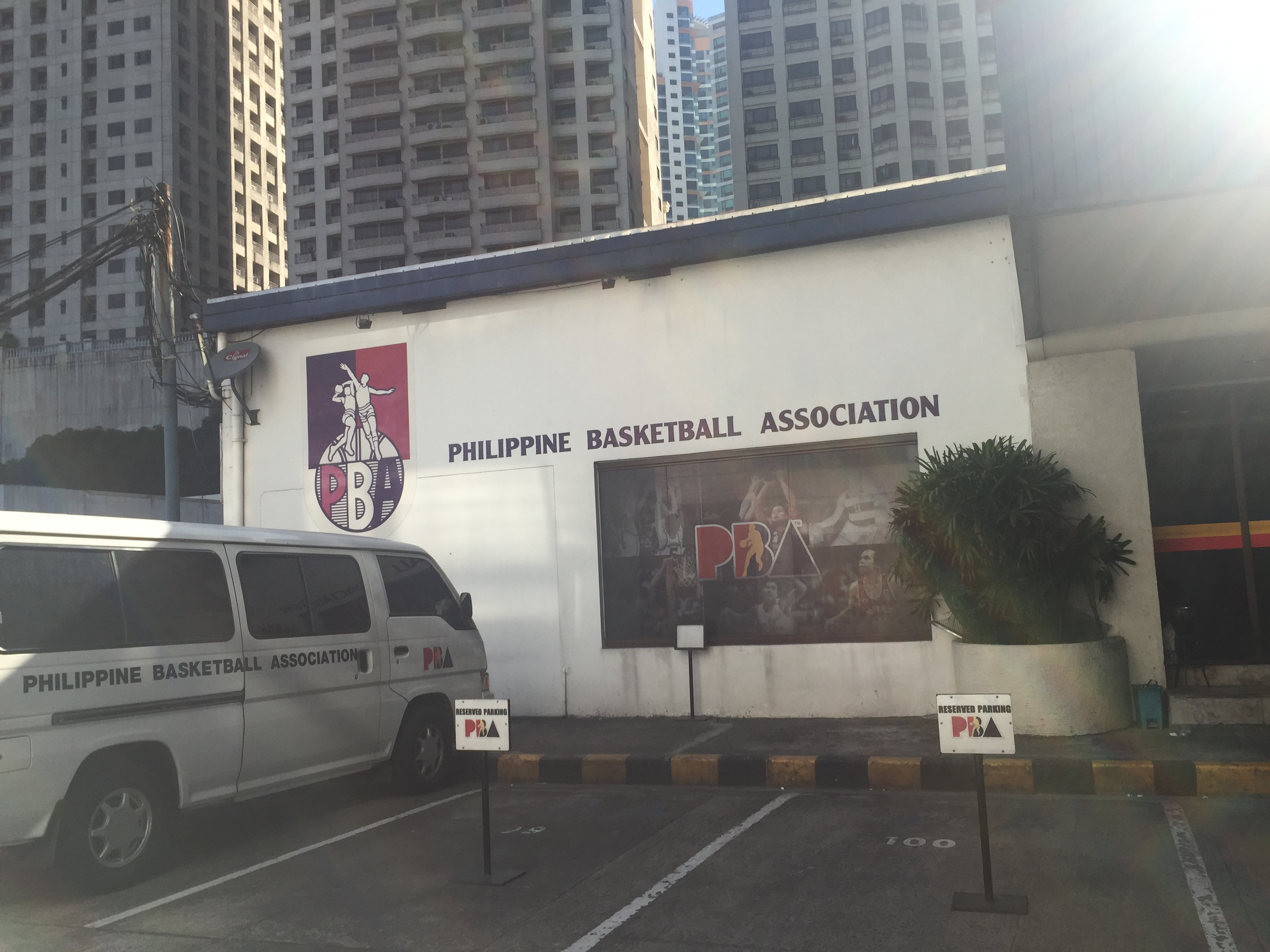
Main office of the PBA.

The league is currently headed by a commissioner, and the chairman of the PBA board of governors. The commissioner handles the marketing and administration aspects as well as the technical, game-related concerns of the PBA and its developmental league. The chairman of the PBA board of governors is elected, together with the vice chairman and board treasurer before the start of the season among each of the league's representatives to the board.

By tradition, from 1994 to 2017, the incumbent vice chairman and treasurer will assume the chairmanship and the vice-chairmanship respectively the following season.

=== Commissioners ===
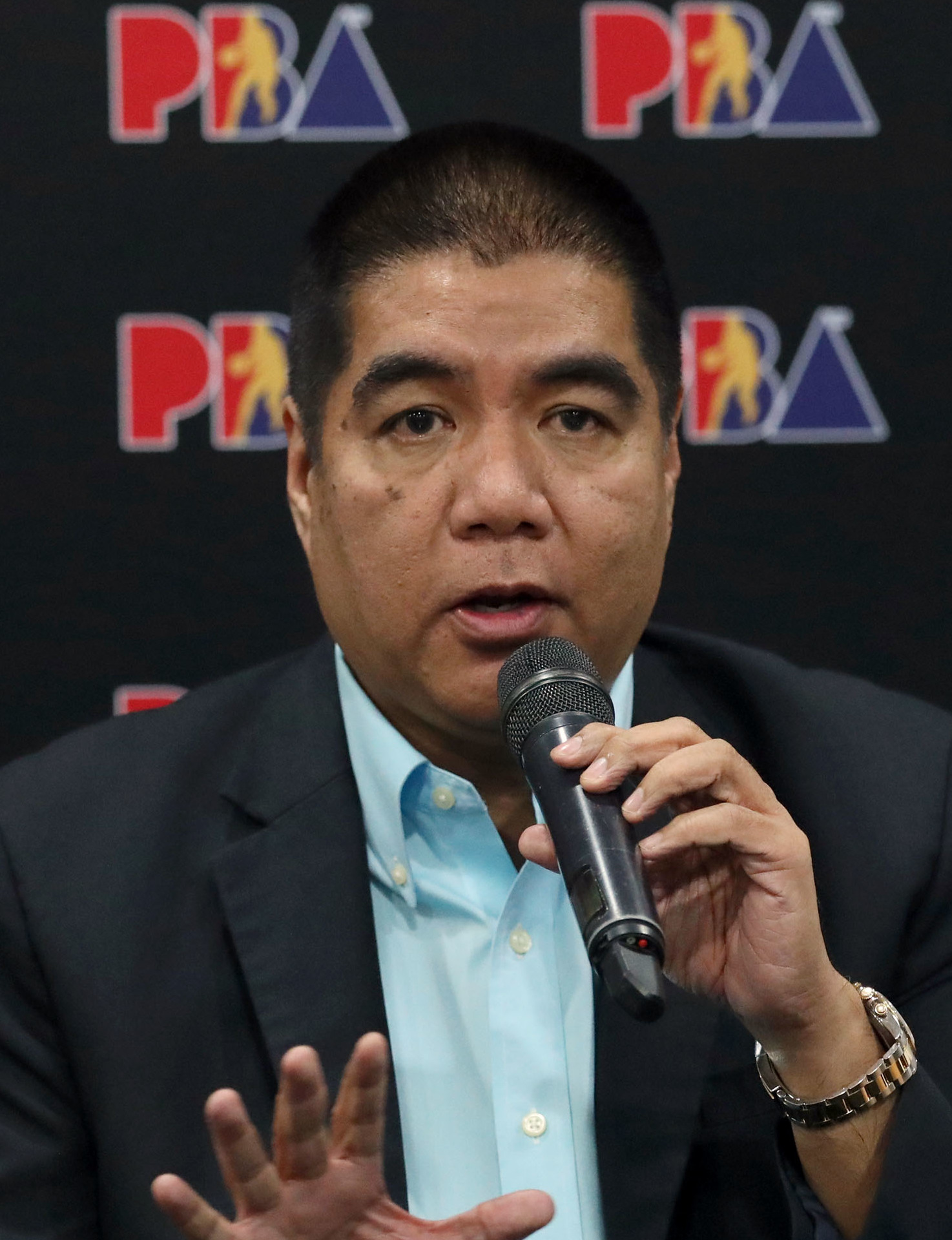
Willie Marcial, commissioner of the PBA since 2018

Commissioner		Term	
Commissioner		From	Until
1	Leo Prieto	April 9, 1975	December 1982
2	Mariano Yenko	January 1983	December 1987
3	Rodrigo Salud	January 21, 1988	January 10, 1992
4	Rey Marquez	January 10, 1992	December 23, 1993
5	Jun Bernardino	January 14, 1994	December 31, 2002
6	Noli Eala	January 1, 2003	August 7, 2007
Sonny Barrios was officer-in-charge or acting commissioner from August 2007 – January 2008
7	Sonny Barrios	January 24, 2008	August 26, 2010
8	Chito Salud	August 26, 2010	July 31, 2015
9	Chito Narvasa	August 1, 2015	December 31, 2017
Willie Marcial was officer-in-charge or acting commissioner from January 1–25, 2018
10	Willie Marcial	January 25, 2018	Present

=== Presidents and chairmen of the board of governors ===
President of the Board of Governors (1975–1985)
Season/s	President	Team
1975	Emerson Coseteng	Mariwasa-Norikate Porcelainmakers
1976–1982	Domingo Itchon	Tanduay Rhum Esquires
1983–1985	Carlos Palanca III	Ginebra San Miguel
Chairman of the Board of Governors (1986–present)
1986	Carlos Palanca III	Ginebra San Miguel
1987–1990	Rey Marquez	Formula Shell Spark Aiders
1991–1993	Moro Lorenzo	Pepsi Hotshots
1994	Wilfred Steven Uytengsu	Alaska Milkmen
1995	Jose Concepcion III	Sunkist Orange Juicers
1996	Teodoro Dimayuga	Purefoods TJ Hotdogs
1997	Nazario Avendaño	San Miguel Beermen
1998	Bernabe Navarro	Ginebra San Miguel
1999	Reynaldo Gamboa	Formula Shell Zoom Masters
2000	Wilfred Steven Uytengsu	Alaska Milkmen
2001	Ignatius Yengco	Talk 'N Text Phone Pals
2002	Francisco Alejo III	Purefoods TJ Hotdogs
2003	Casiano Cabalan Jr.	Barangay Ginebra Kings
2004–05	Manuel Encarnado	Sta. Lucia Realtors
2005–06	Eliezer Capacio	San Miguel Beermen
2006–07	Ricky Vargas	Talk 'N Text Phone Pals
2007–08	Tony Chua	Red Bull Barako
2008–09	Joaqui Trillo	Alaska Aces
2009–10	Alberto Alvarez	Air21 Express
2010–11	Rene Pardo	B-Meg Llamados
2011–12	Mamerto Mondragon	Rain or Shine Elasto Painters
2012–13	Robert Non	Barangay Ginebra San Miguel
2013–14	Ramon Segismundo	Meralco Bolts
2014–15	Patrick Gregorio	Talk 'N Text Tropang Texters
2015–16	Robert Non	San Miguel Beermen
2016–17	Mikee Romero	GlobalPort Batang Pier
2017–present	Ricky Vargas	TNT KaTropa

== See also ==
- PBA Leo Awards
- List of sports attendance figures
- PBA D-League
- PBA Rush
- PBA 3x3
- List of nicknames used in Philippine basketball
- Four-point field goal
