= List of Philippine Basketball Association seasons =

This is a list of Philippine Basketball Association seasons.

== List of seasons ==
Each season is composed of 2 or more conferences; in the PBA where teams are owned by corporations and do not reside in a geographical area, "conferences" are tournaments held during a season.

Winning a conference is considered a greater honor than having the best record in the season; the most prestigious conference is the All-Filipino Cup. If a team wins all three conferences in a single season from 1975 to 2003 and since 2010, winning three consecutive championships, the team is said to have won the "Grand Slam" and is a greatest honor a team can achieve in a single season. Four teams in five different seasons have completed this achievement. During 2004–2010, when the league shifted into a two-conference format, three consecutive championships contribute into a Grand Slam. However, this feat was not accomplished.

Won the Grand Slam
Won two championships
Won one championship
Won no championships

Season	Duration		GP	Conf	Commissioner	TV partner(s)	Teams				
Season	Start	End	GP	Conf	Commissioner	TV partner(s)	Total	Best overall record	PCT	Most wins	Total wins
1975	April 9, 1975	December 14, 1975	179	3	Leo Prieto	KBS	9	Toyota	73.7%	Toyota	42
1976	March 21, 1976	December 21, 1976	196	3	Leo Prieto	BBC	9	Crispa	75.8%	Crispa	47
1977	April 17, 1977	December 18, 1977	199	3	Leo Prieto	KBS	8+2	Crispa	76.6%	Crispa	49
1978	April 16, 1978	December 14, 1978	168	3	Leo Prieto	GTV	8	Toyota	72.7%	Toyota	40
1979	April 1, 1979	December 15, 1979	218	3	Leo Prieto	GTV	9	Toyota	71.0%	Toyota	44
1980	March 16, 1980	December 13, 1980	215	3	Leo Prieto	MBS	10+2	Crispa/Walk Tall	74.6%	Crispa/Walk Tall	44
1981	March 8. 1981	November 28, 1981	206	2	Leo Prieto	MBS	10	Toyota	67.4%	Crispa/Walk Tall	36
1982	March 7, 1982	December 14, 1982	227	3	Mariano Yenko	Vintage on City2	8+1	San Miguel	70.6%	San Miguel	40
1983	March 6, 1983	December 1, 1983	220	3	Mariano Yenko	Vintage on City2, later on MBS	8	Crispa	74.2%	Crispa	46
1984	March 25, 1984	December 18, 1984	194	3	Mariano Yenko	Vintage on MBS	7+1	Great Taste	73.6%	Great Taste	39
1985	March 3, 1985	November 28, 1985	196	3	Mariano Yenko	Vintage on MBS	6+1	Great Taste	62.0%	Great Taste	44
1986	April 6, 1986	December 11, 1986	177	3	Mariano Yenko	Vintage on PTV	7+1	Ginebra	64.6%	Ginebra	42
1987	March 22, 1987	December 13, 1987	182	3	Mariano Yenko	Vintage on PTV	6+1	Magnolia	65.2%	Magnolia	43
1988	March 20, 1988	December 13, 1988	191	3	Rodrigo Salud	Vintage on PTV	6+1	San Miguel	63.9%	San Miguel	46
1989	March 5, 1989	December 12, 1989	186	3	Rodrigo Salud	Vintage on PTV	6+1	San Miguel	70.4%	San Miguel	50
1990	February 18, 1990	December 20, 1990	212	3	Rodrigo Salud	Vintage on PTV	8	Shell	62.5%	Presto	40
1991	February 17, 1991	December 15, 1991	218	3	Rodrigo Salud	Vintage on PTV	8	Alaska	55.4%	Ginebra	33
1991	February 17, 1991	December 15, 1991	218	3	Rodrigo Salud	Vintage on PTV	8	Alaska	55.4%	San Miguel	33
1992	February 9, 1992	December 13, 1992	221	3	Rey Marquez	Vintage on PTV	8	Swift	62.3%	Swift, San Miguel	43
1993	February 28, 1993	December 14, 1993	212	3	Rey Marquez	Vintage on PTV	8	San Miguel	64.8%	Swift, San Miguel	46
1994	March 6, 1994	December 18, 1994	216	3	Jun Bernardino	Vintage on PTV	8	Alaska	61.6%	Alaska	45
1995	February 19, 1995	December 19, 1995	211	3	Jun Bernardino	Vintage on PTV	8	Sunkist	68.1%	Sunkist	49
1996	February 18, 1996	December 17, 1996	216	3	Jun Bernardino	Vintage on IBC	8	Alaska	70.8%	Alaska	51
1997	February 16, 1997	December 14, 1997	223	3	Jun Bernardino	Vintage on IBC	8	Alaska	58.3%	Gordon's Gin	39
1998	February 1, 1998	December 9, 1998	240	4	Jun Bernardino	Vintage on IBC	8+1	Alaska	62.1%	San Miguel	43
1999	February 7, 1999	December 12, 1999	205	3	Jun Bernardino	Vintage on IBC	9	San Miguel	63.6%	San Miguel	35
2000	February 20, 2000	December 20, 2000	218	3	Jun Bernardino	Viva TV on IBC	10	San Miguel	69.0%	San Miguel	40
2001	January 28, 2001	December 16, 2001	247	3	Jun Bernardino	Viva TV on IBC	10	San Miguel	61.4%	San Miguel	43
2002	February 10, 2002	December 25, 2002	227	3	Jun Bernardino	Viva TV on IBC	10+2	Coca-Cola	66.0%	Coca-Cola	31
2003	February 23, 2003	December 14, 2003	245	3	Noli Eala	NBN and IBC	10+4	Red Bull	69.0%	Coca-Cola	44
2004 Fiesta	February 22, 2004	July 7, 2004	118	1	Noli Eala	ABC	10+2	San Miguel	81.0%	San Miguel	16
2004–05	October 3, 2004	July 10, 2005	237	2	Noli Eala	ABC	10	Talk 'N Text	61.8%	Talk 'N Text	34
2005–06	October 2, 2005	July 21, 2006	218	2	Noli Eala	ABC	9	Purefoods	63.2%	Red Bull	38
2006–07	September 28, 2006	July 20, 2007	245	2	Noli Eala	ABC	10	Barangay Ginebra	65.4%	Barangay Ginebra	34
2007–08	October 14, 2007	August 20, 2008	244	2	Sonny Barrios	ABC (TV5)	10	Red Bull	58.5%	Red Bull	31
2008–09	October 4, 2008	July 17, 2009	218	2	Sonny Barrios	Solar Sports on C/S9	10	San Miguel	59.0%	San Miguel	36
2009–10	October 11, 2009	August 18, 2010	241	2	Sonny Barrios	Solar Sports on Solar TV (C/S9)	10+1	Talk 'N Text	65.3%	B-Meg	41
2010–11	October 3, 2010	August 21, 2011	216	3	Chito Salud	Solar Sports on Solar TV/Studio 23	10+1	Talk 'N Text	72.3%	Talk 'N Text	47
2011–12	October 2, 2011	August 5, 2012	233	3	Chito Salud	Sports5 (AKTV on IBC)	10	Talk 'N Text	64.5%	Talk 'N Text	40
2012–13	September 30, 2012	October 25, 2013	249	3	Chito Salud	Sports5 on IBC (AKTV) and TV5	10	Alaska	63.6%	San Mig Coffee	38
2013–14	November 17, 2013	July 9, 2014	227	3	Chito Salud	Sports5 on TV5	10	Talk 'N Text	67.3%	San Mig Super Coffee	41
2014–15	October 19, 2014	July 17, 2015	257	3	Chito Salud	Sports5 on TV5	12	San Miguel	67.9%	San Miguel	37
2015–16	October 21, 2015	October 19, 2016	266	3	Chito Narvasa	Sports5 on TV5	12	San Miguel	65.5%	San Miguel	38
2016–17	November 20, 2016	October 27, 2017	267	3	Chito Narvasa	Sports5 on TV5	12	San Miguel	74.1%	San Miguel	43
2017–18	December 17, 2017	December 19, 2018	261	3	Willie Marcial	ESPN 5 on TV5	12	San Miguel, Magnolia	63.2%	San Miguel, Magnolia	36
2019	January 13, 2019	January 17, 2020	269	3	Willie Marcial	ESPN 5 on TV5	12	TNT	64.8%	San Miguel	37
2020	March 8, 2020	December 9, 2020	86	1	Willie Marcial	One Sports on TV5 and One Sports	12	Barangay Ginebra	72.7%	Barangay Ginebra	16
2021	July 16, 2021	April 22, 2022	180	2	Willie Marcial	One Sports on TV5 and One Sports	12	TNT	70.3%	Magnolia	27
2022–23	June 5, 2022	April 21, 2023	277	3	Willie Marcial	One Sports on TV5 and One Sports	12+1	Bay Area	70.8%	Barangay Ginebra	41
2023–24	November 5, 2023	June 16, 2024	176	2	Willie Marcial	A2Z and RPTV	12	San Miguel	75.0%	San Miguel	33
2024–25	August 18, 2024	July 25, 2025	286	3	Willie Marcial	RPTV	12+1	TNT	66.7%	TNT	50
2025–26	October 5, 2025			3	Willie Marcial	RPTV	12+1				

=== Notes ===
- In 1981, only two conferences were held as the Philippines was the host of the 1981 Southeast Asian Games.
- In 1998, four conferences were held to celebrate the 100th anniversary of the Philippine Declaration of Independence. The group stage results of the third conference (1998 PBA Centennial Cup) were carried over to the fourth (1998 PBA Governors' Cup).
- In 2004, the league shifted to an October–June two-conference calendar from a January–December three-conference calendar to allow players to participate in FIBA tournaments. As a result, the 2004 PBA Fiesta Conference was held to smoothen the transition.
- In 2020, only one conference was held due to the effects of the COVID-19 pandemic in the Philippines.
- In 2021, two conferences were played due to the effects of the COVID-19 pandemic in the Philippines.
- In 2023–24 season, two conferences were held due to the Philippines' hosting of the 2023 FIBA Basketball World Cup and the 2022 Asian Games in China in 2023.
