= 1979 PBA Invitational championship =

- Duration: November 20 – December 15, 1979
- TV partner(s): MBS

Finals
- Champions: Toyota Tamaraws
- Runners-up: Walk Tall Jeansmakers

PBA Invitational championship chronology
- < 1978 1980 >

PBA conference chronology
- < 1979 Open 1980 Open >

The 1979 PBA Invitational championship was the third conference of the 1979 PBA season. It started on November 20 and ended on December 15, 1979.

Toyota Tamaraws won the Invitational crown for the third straight year, defeating arch rival Crispa Walk Tall Jeans, three games to one.

== Format ==
The following format will be observed for the duration of the tournament:

- Top four teams in the second conference are qualified in the Invitational championship. The five eliminated ballclubs in the second conference earlier played in a single round robin to determined the other two qualifiers.
- The top two teams at the end of the single round eliminations advance to the best-of-five finals. The third and fourth-place finishers play in the best-of-five series for third place.

== Elimination round ==
Qualified for finals
Qualified for battle for third

#	Team standings	W	L	PCT	GB
1	Walk Tall Jeans	4	1	.800	--
2	Toyota Tamaraws	4	1	.800	--
3	Gilbey's Gin	3	2	.600	1
4	U/Tex Wranglers	2	3	.400	2
5	Royal Tru-Orange	1	4	.200	3
6	Great Taste Discoverers	1	4	.200	3

== Battle for third ==
GTV

December 8

U/Tex Wranglers 129, Gilbey's Gin 123

Araneta Coliseum, Quezon City

GTV

December 11

U/Tex Wranglers 122, Gilbey's Gin 119

Araneta Coliseum, Quezon City

GTV

December 13

U/Tex Wranglers 123, Gilbey's Gin 115
Pts: James Robinson 47	Pts: Larry McNeill 48
U/Tex wins series, 3-0

Araneta Coliseum, Quezon City

== Finals ==
1979 PBA Invitational Championship finals
Team	Coach	Wins
Toyota Tamaraws	Dante Silverio	3
Walk Tall Jeansmakers	Baby Dalupan	1
- Dates: December 8 to 15, 1979
- Television: MBS

PBA Invitational Championship finals chronology
- < 1978 1982 >

PBA finals chronology
- < 1979 Open 1980 Open >

The 1979 Philippine Basketball Association (PBA) Invitational Championship finals was the best-of-5 basketball championship series of the 1979 PBA Invitational Conference, and the conclusion of the conference's playoffs. Toyota and Crispa Redmanizers played for the 25th championship contested by the league.

Toyota Tamaraws won the championship.

=== Series scoring summary ===
The following scoring summary is written in a line score format, except that the quarter numbers are replaced by game numbers.

Team	Game 1	Game 2	Game 3	Game 4	Wins
Toyota	101	123	107	98	3
Walk Tall	129	95	102	87	1

† denotes the number of overtimes

GTV

December 8

Toyota Tamaraws 101, Walk Tall Jeans 129
Scoring by quarter: 22-33, 25-25, 31-32, 23-39
Pts: Robert Jaworski 23	Pts: Bernard Harris 38

Araneta Coliseum, Quezon City

Fortunato Co shot 22 points and Abet Guidaben added 10 as half of the players fielded by Crispa coach Baby Dalupan hit in double figures. Philip Cezar also starred with 18 points for the Jeansmakers, nine in the second quarter as Walk Tall took the half by 11 points, 58–47.

GTV

December 11

Toyota Tamaraws 123, Walk Tall Jeans 95
Scoring by quarter: 34-26, 32-14, 28-27, 29-28
Pts: Francis Arnaiz 25	Pts: Harris 18 Hubalde 18

Araneta Coliseum, Quezon City

Walk Tall Jeans faced an intact Toyota lineup by virtue of a management decision to reactivate three players suspended at the start of the third conference by coach Dante Silverio. Ramon Fernandez, Abe King and Estoy Estrada reported for their first game but the Tamaraws found themselves without a coach as Dante Silverio resigned earlier in the day as both manager and coach.

Crispa played with only one import as Irvin Chatman was in sick bay. Toyota led by 10 points, 36–26 at the end of the first quarter. The Tamaraws went full steam in the second quarter and posted a 22-point lead at the half. With Andy Fields and Bruce King running rings around the lone Walk Tall Jeans import Bernard Harris, the Tamaraws upped their lead to 27 at the close of the third quarter, 94–67. Early in the fourth, Crispa coach Baby Dalupan went All-Filipino to signify he was throwing in the towel. With still 6:30 to go, Toyota held its biggest lead in the game at 37 points, 107–70.

GTV

December 13

Toyota Tamaraws 107, Walk Tall Jeans 102
Scoring by quarter: 21-22, 31-20, 32-29, 23-31
Pts: Andrew Fields 29	Pts: Philip Cezar 30

Araneta Coliseum, Quezon City

The Tamaraws outscored the Jeansmakers, 31–20, in the second quarter for a 52–42 halftime lead from which Crispa never recovered. The defending champions went on to post their biggest lead, 82–63, and then held off a rally by the Jeansmakers in the closing minutes.

GTV

December 15

Toyota Tamaraws 98, Walk Tall Jeans 87
Scoring by quarter: 21-17, 29-28, 17-14, 31-28
Pts: Robert Jaworski 30	Pts: Bernard Harris 19
Toyota wins series, 3-1

Araneta Coliseum, Quezon City

Robert Jaworski lobbed in seven straight points as Toyota tried to breakaway, 83–75, midway in the final quarter. The Tamaraws were up by four points when Andrew Fields capped a 9-4 binge with a towering dunkshot that took out the pressure, 94–85, with 1:54 to go.
