= Salud =

Salud ("health" in Spanish) may refer to:

== Music ==
- ¡Salud! João Gilberto, Originator of the Bossa Nova, 1963 studio album by Jon Hendricks
- Salud, dinero y dinero, 1991 Trotsky Vengarán album
- "Salud", song by RJD2 from Deadringer
- "Salud", song by Sky Blu featuring Reek Rude, Sensato, and Wilmer Valderrama

== People ==
- Salud Algabre (1894—1979), Filipina revolutionary
- Salud Carbajal (born 1964), American politician serving as U.S. Representative for California
- Salud (surname), a surname

== Other uses ==
- Salud, Colón, Panama
- "Salud" (Breaking Bad), a 2011 episode of the TV series Breaking Bad
- Salud (sculpture), a bronze sculpture by Jim Demetro
