= Salud (surname) =

Salud is a surname. Notable people with the surname include:

- Rudy Salud (1938–2011), Filipino boxing manager and commissioner of the Philippine Basketball Association from 1988 to 1992
- Chito Salud (born 1962), current commissioner of the Philippine Basketball Association and son of Rudy Salud.
