= 1978 Toyota Tamaraws season =

- Head coach: Dante Silverio; Fort Acuña
- Owner: Delta Motor Corporation

All-Filipino Conference results
- Record: 19–5 (79.2%)
- Place: 1st
- Playoff finish: Finals

Open Conference results
- Record: 14–9 (60.9%)
- Place: 3rd
- Playoff finish: Semifinals

Invitational Conference results
- Record: 7–1 (87.5%)
- Place: 1st
- Playoff finish: Finals

Toyota Tamaraws seasons

The 1978 Toyota Tamaraws season was the fourth season of the franchise in the Philippine Basketball Association (PBA).

== Colors ==
(dark)
(light)

== Championships ==
The Toyota Tamaraws had a manpower build-up at the start of the season by acquiring forwards Danny Florencio and Estoy Estrada. The Tamaraws capped their year-run by winning two titles.

On July 15, Toyota defeated new team Filmanbank, 132–113 in Game four to win the PBA All Filipino crown, three games to one. The Tamaraws won the first two games of the series easily but the Bankers avoided a sweep by taking the third game.

After failing to land in the finals berth of the Second Conference, the Tamaraws captured the Invitational championship behind imports Carlos Terry and Bruce "Sky" King. On December 14, Toyota defeated Tanduay, 108–98 in Game four of the finals series for a 3–1 victory as the Tamaraws won their 5th PBA title.

== Awards ==
Robert Jaworski was named the league's Most Valuable Player (MVP).

== Summary ==
The Tamaraws easily made it to the All-Filipino Conference semifinals with 12 wins and two losses at the end of the two-round eliminations and tied with their rivals Crispa Redmanizers. In the semifinal round, Toyota eliminated Crispa, finishing with a 4-2 won-loss record along with Filmanbank, which occupied the first finals berth. The Tamaraws scored a 3-1 finals victory against a Filmanbank squad led by American Billy Robinson and local standouts Larry Mumar and Jun Papa.

Toyota brought in two Americans for the Open Conference, 6-10 Bruce King and 6-11 T.J. Robinson. The Tamaraws won six of their seven games in the second round of eliminations with Carlos Terry replacing Robinson. They shove out Royal Tru-Orange to salvage the last semifinals berth. Toyota started with two straight defeats in the semifinal round and were knock off from the finals picture, winning only two of their six outings. Under assistant coach Fort Acuña, the Tamaraws swept Tanduay in three games in their series for third place.

With their victories against Yugoslavia and Canada in exhibition games, the Tamaraws were again installed as favorites to defend the Invitational crown they won last season, although Danny Florencio was not able to play anymore and Estoy Estrada was not to recover from his slump. Toyota grabbed the first seat of the championship with ease by winning all of its four games in the round-robin among five teams and bested second qualifier Tanduay (3-1) in four games of their best-of-five final series.

== Roster ==
Toyota Tamaraws roster
Players
Coaches

| Pos. | No. | Nat. | Name | Ht. | Wt. |
|---|---|---|---|---|---|---|
| F | 5 | (Philippines) | Ernesto Estrada | 5 ft 11 in (1.80 m) | | Visayas |
| F/C | 6 | (Philippines) | Abe King | 6 ft 3 in (1.91 m) | | San Beda |
| G | 7 | (Philippines) | Robert Jaworski | 6 ft 0 in (1.83 m) | | UE |
| G | 8 | (Philippines) | Francis Arnaiz | 5 ft 10 in (1.78 m) | | Ateneo |
| F/C | 10 | (Philippines) | Ramon Fernandez | 6 ft 4 in (1.93 m) | | San Carlos |
| F/C | 11 | (United States) | Bruce King (I) | 6 ft 8 in (2.03 m) | | Iowa |
| G | 12 | (Philippines) | Pablo Javier | 5 ft 11 in (1.80 m) | | Far Eastern |
| G/F | 13 | (Philippines) | Jesus Sta.Maria | 5 ft 11 in (1.80 m) | | José Rizal |
| G | 14 | (Philippines) | Rino Salazar | 5 ft 9 in (1.75 m) | | Letran |
| G/F | 17 | (Philippines) | Fort Acuña | 6 ft 1 in (1.85 m) | | Philippines |
| F | 18 | (Philippines) | Emerito Legaspi | 5 ft 11 in (1.80 m) | | UE |
| F | 20 | (Philippines) | Nicanor Bulaong | 6 ft 3 in (1.91 m) | | Far Eastern |
| G/F | 22 | (Philippines) | Danny Florencio | 5 ft 10 in (1.78 m) | | UST |
| C | 33 | (United States) | T.J. Robinson (I) | 6 ft 11 in (2.11 m) |
| F | 42 | (United States) | Carlos Terry (I) | 6 ft 5 in (1.96 m) | | Winston-Salem State |

Head coach

- (Philippines) Dante Silverio

Assistant coach(es)

- (Philippines) Fort Acuña

Legend

- (C) Team captain
- (I) Import
- Injured
