= 1978 PBA Invitational championship =

Basketball championship event

- Duration: November 25 – December 14, 1978
- TV partner(s): GTV

Finals
- Champions: Toyota Tamaraws
- Runners-up: Tanduay Esquires

PBA Invitational championship chronology
- < 1977 1979 >

PBA conference chronology
- < 1978 Open 1979 All-Filipino >

The 1978 PBA Invitational championship was the third conference of the 1978 PBA season. It started on November 25 and ended on December 14, 1978.

The Toyota Tamaraws retains the Invitational crown with a 3–1 series victory over first-time finalist Tanduay Esquires.

== Format ==
The following format will be observed for the duration of the tournament:

- Top five teams in the first two conferences are qualified in the Invitational championship.
- The top two teams at the end of the single round eliminations advance to the best-of-five finals. The third and fourth-place finishers play in the best-of-five series for third place.

== Elimination round ==
Qualified for finals
Qualified for battle for third

#	Team Standings	W	L	PCT	GB
1	Toyota Tamaraws	4	0	.1000	–
2	Tanduay ESQ	3	1	.750	–
3	U/Tex Wranglers	2	2	.500	–
4	Crispa 400	1	3	.250	–
5	Filmanbank Bankers	0	4	.000	–

== Battle for third ==
GTV

December 7

Crispa 400 107, U/Tex Wranglers 96

Araneta Coliseum, Quezon City

GTV

December 9

Crispa 400 121, U/Tex Wranglers 101

Araneta Coliseum, Quezon City

GTV

December 12

Crispa 400 94, U/Tex Wranglers 82
Crispa wins series, 3–0

Araneta Coliseum, Quezon City

== Finals ==
1978 PBA Invitational Championship finals
Team	Coach	Wins
Toyota Tamaraws	Dante Silverio	3
Tanduay ESQ	Carlos Loyzaga	1
- Dates: December 7 to 14, 1979
- Television: MBS

PBA Invitational Championship finals chronology
- < 1977 1979 >

PBA finals chronology
- < 1978 Open 1979 All-Filipino >

The 1978 Philippine Basketball Association (PBA) Invitational Championship finals was the best-of-5 basketball championship series of the 1979 PBA Invitational Conference, and the conclusion of the conference's playoffs.

Toyota Tamaraws won the championship.

=== Series scoring summary ===
The following scoring summary is written in a line score format, except that the quarter numbers are replaced by game numbers.

Team	Game 1	Game 2	Game 3	Game 4	Wins
Toyota	129	80	128	108	3
Tanduay	123	92	118	98	1

† denotes the number of overtimes

GTV

December 7

Toyota Tamaraws 129, Tanduay ESQ 123
Scoring by quarter: 42–36, 27–28, 34–35, 26–24
Pts: Francis Arnaiz 31

Araneta Coliseum, Quezon City

GTV

December 9

Toyota Tamaraws 80, Tanduay ESQ 92

Araneta Coliseum, Quezon City

GTV

December 12

Toyota Tamaraws 128, Tanduay ESQ 118
Scoring by quarter: 38–20, 27–37, 31–35, 32–26
Pts: Carlos Terry 41	Pts: Gene Moore 41

Araneta Coliseum, Quezon City

GTV

December 14

Toyota Tamaraws 108, Tanduay ESQ 98
Scoring by quarter: 30–15, 28–25, 25–22, 25–36
Pts: Carlos Terry 36
Toyota wins series, 3–1

Araneta Coliseum, Quezon City
