= 2013–14 PBA season =

39th PBA season

- Duration: November 17, 2013 – July 9, 2014
- Teams: 10
- TV partner(s): Local: Sports5; TV5; AksyonTV; Cignal PPV (HD); International: Fox Sports Asia; AksyonTV International

2013 PBA draft
- Top draft pick: Greg Slaughter
- Picked by: Barangay Ginebra
- Season MVP: June Mar Fajardo (San Miguel Beermen)
- Top scorer: Jayson Castro (Talk N' Text Tropang Texters)
- Philippine Cup champions: San Mig Super Coffee Mixers
- Philippine Cup runners-up: Rain or Shine Elasto Painters
- Commissioner's Cup champions: San Mig Super Coffee Mixers
- Commissioner's Cup runners-up: Talk 'N Text Tropang Texters
- Governors' Cup champions: San Mig Super Coffee Mixers
- Governors' Cup runners-up: Rain or Shine Elasto Painters

Seasons
- ← 2012–13 2014–15 →

The 2013–14 PBA season was the 39th season of the Philippine Basketball Association (PBA). The season formally opened on November 17, 2013, and finished on July 9, 2014. The league continued to use the three-conference format, starting with the Philippine Cup, or the traditional All-Filipino Conference. The Commissioner's Cup and the Governors' Cup is the second and third conferences for this season. Originally scheduled to end on August 13, the season schedule was shortened to allow more time for Gilas Pilipinas to prepare for the 2014 FIBA Basketball World Cup and the 2014 Asian Games.

Due to the Philippines' hosting of the 2013 FIBA Asia Championship last August, the third conference of the previous season, the 2013 PBA Governors' Cup was rescheduled to start on August 13. Subsequently, the annual draft and the opening of the new season, which is usually held every last week of August and first week of October respectively since 2004, was moved to November.

The first activity of the season was the 2013 PBA draft held on November 3.

== Board of governors ==
=== Executive committee ===
- Angelico Salud (Commissioner)
- Ramon Segismundo (chairman, representing Meralco Bolts)
- Patrick Gregorio (Vice-chairman, representing Talk 'N Text Tropang Texters)
- Robert Non (Treasurer, representing San Miguel Beermen)

== Teams ==
Team	Company	Governor	Alternate Governor
Air21 Express	Airfrieght 2100, Inc.	Angelito Alvarez	Jerry Jara
Alaska Aces	Alaska Milk Corporation	Richard Bachmann	
Barako Bull Energy	Energy Food and Drinks Inc.	Manuel Alvarez	
Barangay Ginebra San Miguel	Ginebra San Miguel, Inc.	Bernie Marquez	Alfrancis Chua
GlobalPort Batang Pier	Sultan 900 Capital, Inc.	Michael Romero	Nathaniel Romero / Erick Arejola
Meralco Bolts	Manila Electric Company	Ramon Segismundo	Al Panlilio / Betty Siy-Yap
Rain or Shine Elasto Painters	Asian Coatings Philippines, Inc.	Mamerto Mondragon	Edison Orbania
San Mig Super Coffee Mixers	San Miguel Pure Foods Company, Inc.	Rene Pardo	
San Miguel Beermen	San Miguel Brewery, Inc.	Roberto Huang	Robert Non
Talk 'N Text Tropang Texters	Smart Communications	Manuel V. Pangilinan	Victorino Vargas

== Arenas ==
Metro Manila venues of the PBA.
Provincial venues of the PBA that hosted one game day (red), and two or more game days (blue).

Like several Metro Manila-centric leagues, most games are held at arenas within Metro Manila, and sometimes, Antipolo. Games outside this area are called "out-of-town" games, and are usually played on Saturdays. Provincial arenas usually host one game, rarely two; these arenas typically host only once per season, but could return occasionally.

=== Main arenas ===
Arena	City
Cuneta Astrodome	Pasay
Mall of Asia Arena	Pasay
Smart Araneta Coliseum	Quezon City
PhilSports Arena	Pasig

=== Out-of-town arenas ===
Arena	City	Date	Match-up
Cebu Coliseum	Cebu City	November 17, 2013	Meralco vs. Talk 'N Text
University of Southeastern Philippines Gym	Davao City	November 17, 2013	Alaska vs. Rain or Shine
Dipolog Sports Center	Dipolog, Zamboanga del Norte	December 14, 2013	Meralco vs. Petron
Alonte Sports Arena	Biñan, Laguna	March 29, 2014	Alaska vs. San Miguel
Alonte Sports Arena	Biñan, Laguna	May 28, 2014	San Miguel vs. Barako Bull; Rain or Shine vs. Talk 'N Text
Alonte Sports Arena	Biñan, Laguna	June 8, 2014	Barako Bull vs. GlobalPort; Rain or Shine vs. Barangay Ginebra
Alonte Sports Arena	Biñan, Laguna	June 14, 2014	Meralco vs. GlobalPort; Air21 vs. San Miguel
Xavier University – Ateneo de Cagayan Gym	Cagayan de Oro	June 7, 2014	San Miguel vs. Meralco

== Pre-season events ==
=== Player movement ===
Key transactions:

=== Notable occurrences ===
- The fifth PBA Hall of Fame ceremony was held during the opening ceremonies of the 2013−14 PBA season. This year's inductees includes players Benjie Paras, Ronnie Magsanoc, Lim Eng Beng and coach Ed Ocampo
- The PBA's developmental league held its first draft on September 19. Subsequently, the new D-League season began on October 24.
- Possible changes of the season calendar will be further discussed between the league and the Samahang Basketbol ng Pilipinas for the preparation of the Philippines men's national basketball team for the 2014 FIBA Basketball World Cup, which was scheduled to be held in Spain from August 30 to September 14, 2014.
- Sports5 transferred the broadcast of the PBA games to their main network TV5. Also, Fox Sports will air live simulcasts of the Wednesday doubleheaders in English commentary, starting November 20, 2013.
- A second version of the Jun Bernardino Trophy was created after the 2006 trophy was awarded to the Talk 'N Text Tropang Texters after they won the Philippine Cup for the third consecutive year last season.

=== Coaching changes ===
- Junel Baculi is replaced by Richie Ticzon as head coach of the GlobalPort Batang Pier.

== Opening ceremonies ==
The opening ceremonies for this season were held in three different locations, one each representing Luzon (Smart Araneta Coliseum, Quezon City), Visayas (Cebu Coliseum), and Mindanao (USEP Gymnasium, Davao City), while the main ceremonies was held at the Smart Araneta Coliseum in Quezon City.

The muses for the participating teams are as follows:

Team	Muse
Air21 Express	Lauren Young
Alaska Aces	Fila Guia Hidalgo
Barako Bull Energy	Tereza Fajksova
Barangay Ginebra San Miguel	Marian Rivera
GlobalPort Batang Pier	Maxene Magalona
Meralco Bolts	Sophie Albert and Stephanie Rowe
Petron Blaze Boosters	Gretchen Ho
Rain or Shine Elasto Painters	Koreen Medina
San Mig Coffee Mixers	Isabel Oli
Talk 'N Text Tropang Texters	Chanel Morales and Danielle Montano Lee

== 2013–14 Philippine Cup ==
=== Notable events ===
- On January 13, 2014, San Miguel Corporation president Ramon S. Ang announced that the Petron Blaze Boosters will revert to its iconic name "San Miguel Beermen" starting in the 2014 PBA Commissioner's Cup.
- On January 29, 2014, GlobalPort owner Mikee Romero announced that interim coach Richie Ticzon would be replaced by Pido Jarencio as head coach of GlobalPort Batang Pier starting next conference.
- The league's board of governors approved the proposal of shortening the finals series of the Commissioner's and Governors' Cups to a best-of-five to give time for the Philippine men's national basketball team time to prepare for the 2014 FIBA Basketball World Cup and the 2014 Asian Games. The opening of the 2014–15 season will also be moved to October 19. The format was shortened to a best-of-5 format instead of the usual best-of-7 due to changes in the season calendar to accommodate Gilas Pilipinas's participation in the 2014 FIBA Basketball World Cup and the 2014 Asian Games.
- On February 12, 2014, the seventh game of the 2013-14 PBA Philippine Cup Semifinals series between Barangay Ginebra San Miguel and San Mig Super Coffee Mixers set the all-time basketball attendance record of 24,883, which broke the previous record of 23,436 set on May 19, 2013, that featured Game Three of the PBA Commissioner's Cup finals between the Alaska Aces and the Barangay Ginebra San Miguel.
- The Rain or Shine Elasto Painters staged a "partial walkout" during game 6 of their finals series against the San Mig Super Coffee Mixers at the 10:59 mark of the second quarter. Rain or Shine returned to the playing court before the 15-minute time limit given to teams who walks out of the playing court and eventually lost to San Mig Super Coffee.
- On February 25, 2014, Petron Blaze/San Miguel Beer board governor Ely Capacio died following a stroke The league paid tribute to him before the start of game 5 of the Philippine Cup finals. Also, the San Mig Super Coffee Mixers, which was coached by Capacio in 1991, had black patches in their jerseys as a sign of mourning.
- San Mig Super Coffee coach Tim Cone became the winning-est coach in PBA history after his team clinched his 16th title. He surpassed the record of 15 championships set by Baby Dalupan before he retired as a coach in 1991.
- The San Mig Super Coffee Mixers became the team with most All-Filipino/Philippine Cup championships after winning their sixth Philippine Cup, surpassing the Crispa Redmanizers with five All-Filipino titles.
- PBA Commissioner Chito Salud penalized the Rain or Shine Elasto Painters with a P2 million for their "partial walkout" during the 2nd quarter (11:49) of their finals in game 6 against the San Mig Super Coffee Mixers.
- Rain or Shine coach Yeng Guiao accumulated a record total of P426,400 worth of fines due to a league rule that penalizes a coach, player or official that receives more than nine technical fouls in a conference after incurring 13 technicals during the tournament (P50,000 each technical foul), and the P100,000 fine sanctioned to him after flashing the finger at league officials during the semifinals.

=== Elimination round ===
Pos	Team	W	L	PCT	GB	Qualification
1	Barangay Ginebra San Miguel	11	3	.786 (Note: Head-to-head record: Barangay Ginebra 1–0 Rain or Shine)	—	Twice-to-beat in the quarterfinals
2	Rain or Shine Elasto Painters	11	3	.786	—	Twice-to-beat in the quarterfinals
3	Petron Blaze Boosters	10	4	.714	1	Best-of-three quarterfinals
4	Talk 'N Text Tropang Texters	8	6	.571	3	Best-of-three quarterfinals
5	San Mig Super Coffee Mixers	7	7	.500	4	Best-of-three quarterfinals
6	Barako Bull Energy	5	9	.357 (Note: Head-to-head quotient: Barako Bull 1.06, GlobalPort 1.01, Alaska 0.99, Meralco 0.95; eighth seed playoff: Alaska 94–91 Meralco)	6	Best-of-three quarterfinals
7	GlobalPort Batang Pier	5	9	.357	6	Twice-to-win in the quarterfinals
8	Alaska Aces	5	9	.357	6	Twice-to-win in the quarterfinals
9	Meralco Bolts	5	9	.357	6	
10	Air21 Express	3	11	.214	8	

Source: PBA.ph

=== Playoffs ===
Quarterfinals
(#1 twice-to-beat)
1	Barangay Ginebra	97	108
8	Alaska	104	95
(Best-of-3)
4	Talk 'N Text	1
5	San Mig Coffee	2
(#2 twice-to-beat)
2	Rain or Shine	106
7	GlobalPort	96
(Best-of-3)
3	Petron Blaze	2
6	Barako Bull	0

Semifinals (Best-of-7)
1	Barangay Ginebra	3
5	San Mig Coffee	4
2	Rain or Shine	4
3	Petron Blaze	1

Finals (Best-of-7)
5	San Mig Coffee	4
2	Rain or Shine	2

==== Quarterfinals ====
Team 1	Series	Team 2	Game 1	Game 2
(1) Barangay Ginebra San Miguel*	1–1	(8) Alaska Aces	97–104	108–95
(2) Rain or Shine Elasto Painters*	1–0	(7) GlobalPort Batang Pier	106–96	—

Team 1	Series	Team 2	Game 1	Game 2	Game 3
(3) Petron Blaze Boosters	2–0	(6) Barako Bull Energy	101–88	107–100	—
(4) Talk 'N Text Tropang Texters	1–2	(5) San Mig Super Coffee Mixers	83–90	82–77	82–90

*Team has twice-to-beat advantage. Team #1 only has to win once, while Team #2 has to win twice.

==== Semifinals ====
Team 1	Series	Team 2	Game 1	Game 2	Game 3	Game 4	Game 5	Game 6	Game 7
(1) Barangay Ginebra San Miguel	3–4	(5) San Mig Super Coffee Mixers	83–85	93–64	89–97	85–82	76–79	94–91	87–110
(2) Rain or Shine Elasto Painters	4–1	(3) Petron Blaze Boosters	103–95	103–94	73–106	88–83	97–88	—	—

=== Finals ===
Team 1	Series	Team 2	Game 1	Game 2	Game 3	Game 4	Game 5	Game 6	Game 7
(2) Rain or Shine Elasto Painters	2–4	(5) San Mig Super Coffee Mixers	83–80	70–80	76–77	90–93	81–74	87–93	—

- Finals MVP: Mark Barroca (San Mig Super Coffee Mixers)
- Best Player of the Conference: June Mar Fajardo (Petron Blaze Boosters)

== 2014 Commissioner's Cup ==
=== Notable events ===
- Ever Bilena Incorporated owner Dioceldo Sy submitted a letter of intent for the application of his PBA D-League team, Black Water Sports in joining as an expansion team for the 2014–15 season. This was after Ever Bilena was given clearance of its financial capability to put up a PBA team.
- Columbian Autocar Corporation (CAC), the distributor of Kia cars in the Philippines submitted its letter of intent to join the PBA starting in the next 2014–15 season.
- Metro Pacific Investments Corporation, owners of the NLEX Road Warriors team in the PBA D-League has submitted its letter of intent to join the PBA as an expansion team.
- After the regular meeting of the PBA Board of Governors last March 6, PBA commissioner Chito Salud announced that he will review the submitted requirements of the three companies that applied for an expansion team to determine their financial and operating capability in having a PBA team. He will send his recommendations by April to the board of governors.
- The league's Board of Governors unanimously approved the application of Blackwater, Kia, and NLEX as expansion teams for the 2014–15 PBA season during their meeting on April 10. As a concession with Kia, who does not have a basketball team in the PBA D-League, the Board of Governors did not allow Blackwater and NLEX to sign up their players from their D-League teams. Instead, the expansion teams will build their teams through an expansion draft with the 10 existing teams will protect 14 players in their roster, the free agency and the rookie draft, in which the expansion teams will be given the 11th, 12th and 13th pick in the first round of the 2014 PBA draft.
- Additional concessions were given to the three expansion teams at the conclusion of the special meeting by the league's Board of Governors. These include the revision of the expansion draft in which the 10 existing teams will protect 12 players from the previous 14, and the first three picks of the second round of the 2014 PBA draft. Only the three expansion teams will be allowed to pick players after the third round of the rookie draft.
- Rain or Shine Elasto Painters coach Yeng Guiao was slapped with a P100,000 fine after an altercation with Meralco Bolts player Cliff Hodge and calling him "mongoloid" (a derogatory word used in the Philippines for persons who has Down syndrome) after the second game of their best-of-three quarterfinals game. Meanwhile, Hodge's flagrant foul on Raymond Almazan on the same game was upgraded to flagrant foul penalty two and was fined with P20,000
- Air21 Express made their first semifinals appearance in franchise history, after beating second-seeded San Miguel Beermen with the knockout game ending in two overtimes.
- Sports5 head Chot Reyes announced via Twitter that the PBA games will now be aired in high definition for Cignal Digital TV subscribers starting with the 2014 Commissioner's Cup finals.

=== Elimination round ===
Pos	Team	W	L	PCT	GB	Qualification
1	Talk 'N Text Tropang Texters	9	0	1.000	—	Twice-to-beat in the quarterfinals
2	San Miguel Beermen	7	2	.778	2	Twice-to-beat in the quarterfinals
3	Alaska Aces	6	3	.667	3	Best-of-three quarterfinals
4	Rain or Shine Elasto Painters	5	4	.556 (Note: Head-to-head record: Rain or Shine 1–0 Meralco)	4	Best-of-three quarterfinals
5	Meralco Bolts	5	4	.556	4	Best-of-three quarterfinals
6	San Mig Super Coffee Mixers	4	5	.444	5	Best-of-three quarterfinals
7	Air21 Express	3	6	.333 (Note: Head-to-head record: Air21 1–0 Barangay Ginebra)	6	Twice-to-win in the quarterfinals
8	Barangay Ginebra San Miguel	3	6	.333	6	Twice-to-win in the quarterfinals
9	Barako Bull Energy	2	7	.222	7	
10	GlobalPort Batang Pier	1	8	.111	8	

Source: PBA.ph

=== Playoffs ===
Quarterfinals
(#1 twice-to-beat)
1	Talk 'N Text	97
8	Barangay Ginebra	84
(Best-of-3)
4	Rain or Shine	2
5	Meralco	1
(#2 twice-to-beat)
2	San Miguel	79	95
7	Air21	92	101**
(Best-of-3)
3	Alaska	1
6	San Mig Coffee	2

Semifinals (Best-of-5)
1	Talk 'N Text	3
4	Rain or Shine	0
7	Air21	2
6	San Mig Coffee	3

Finals (Best-of-5)
1	Talk 'N Text	1
6	San Mig Coffee	3

**double overtime

==== Quarterfinals ====
Team 1	Series	Team 2	Game 1	Game 2
(1) Talk 'N Text Tropang Texters*	1–0	(8) Barangay Ginebra San Miguel	97–84	—
(2) San Miguel Beermen*	0–2	(7) Air21 Express	79–92	95–101 (2OT)

Team 1	Series	Team 2	Game 1	Game 2	Game 3
(3) Alaska Aces	1–2	(6) San Mig Super Coffee Mixers	86–77	65–70	65–79
(4) Rain or Shine Elasto Painters	2–1	(5) Meralco Bolts	91–94	102–93	97–96 (OT)

*Team has twice-to-beat advantage. Team #1 only has to win once, while Team #2 has to win twice.

==== Semifinals ====
Team 1	Series	Team 2	Game 1	Game 2	Game 3	Game 4	Game 5
(1) Talk 'N Text Tropang Texters	3–0	(4) Rain or Shine Elasto Painters	91–85	94–87	99–91	—	—
(6) San Mig Super Coffee Mixers	3–2	(7) Air21 Express	100–103	82–75	84–73	91–94	99–83

==== Finals ====
Team 1	Series	Team 2	Game 1	Game 2	Game 3	Game 4	Game 5
(1) Talk 'N Text Tropang Texters	1–3	(6) San Mig Super Coffee Mixers	80–95	86–76	75–77	91–100	—

- Finals MVP: James Yap (San Mig Super Coffee)
- Best Player of the Conference: Jayson Castro (Talk 'N Text)
- Bobby Parks Best Import of the Conference: Richard Howell (Talk 'N Text)

== 2014 Governors' Cup ==
=== Notable events ===
- Jeffrey Cariaso was named as the head coach of Barangay Ginebra San Miguel. Olsen Racela was also transferred from San Mig Super Coffee to Barangay Ginebra to become the lead assistant coach.
- Luigi Trillo resigned as head coach of the Alaska Aces due to family reasons and was replaced by Alex Compton.
- The sale of the Air21 Express franchise to Metro Pacific Investments Corporation, owners of the NLEX Road Warriors has been approved by the PBA Board of Governors on June 26, 2014.

=== Elimination round ===
Pos	Team	W	L	PCT	GB	Qualification
1	Talk 'N Text Tropang Texters	7	2	.778	—	Twice-to-beat in the quarterfinals
2	Rain or Shine Elasto Painters	6	3	.667	1	Twice-to-beat in the quarterfinals
3	Alaska Aces	5	4	.556 (Note: Head-to-head quotient: Alaska 1.08, San Mig 1.02, San Miguel 0.99, Barangay Ginebra 0.97, Air21 0.94)	2	Twice-to-beat in the quarterfinals
4	San Mig Super Coffee Mixers	5	4	.556	2	Twice-to-beat in the quarterfinals
5	Petron Blaze Boosters	5	4	.556	2	Twice-to-win in the quarterfinals
6	Barangay Ginebra San Miguel	5	4	.556	2	Twice-to-win in the quarterfinals
7	Air21 Express	5	4	.556	2	Twice-to-win in the quarterfinals
8	Barako Bull Energy	3	6	.333 (Note: Head-to-head record: Barako Bull 95–94 Meralco)	4	Twice-to-win in the quarterfinals
9	Meralco Bolts	3	6	.333	4	
10	GlobalPort Batang Pier	1	8	.111	6	

Source: PBA.ph

=== Playoffs ===
Quarterfinals (Top 4 twice-to-beat)
1	Talk 'N Text	99
8	Barako Bull	84
4	San Mig Coffee	97
5	San Miguel	90
2	Rain or Shine	111
7	Air21	90
3	Alaska	92
6	Barangay Ginebra	81

Semifinals (Best-of-5)
1	Talk 'N Text	2
4	San Mig Coffee	3
2	Rain or Shine	3
3	Alaska	2

Finals (Best-of-5)
4	San Mig Coffee	3
2	Rain or Shine	2

==== Quarterfinals ====
Team 1	Series	Team 2	Game 1	Game 2
(1) Talk 'N Text Tropang Texters	1–0	(8) Barako Bull Energy	99–84	—
(2) Rain or Shine Elasto Painters*	1–0	(7) Air21 Express	111–90	—
(3) Alaska Aces*	1–0	(6) Barangay Ginebra San Miguel	92–81	—
(4) San Mig Super Coffee Mixers*	1–0	(5) San Miguel Beermen	97–90	—

*Team has twice-to-beat advantage. Team #1 only has to win once, while Team #2 has to win twice.

==== Semifinals ====
Team 1	Series	Team 2	Game 1	Game 2	Game 3	Game 4	Game 5
(1) Talk 'N Text Tropang Texters	2–3	(4) San Mig Super Coffee Mixers	88–92 (OT)	85–93	112–86	84–81 (OT)	87–93
(2) Rain or Shine Elasto Painters	3–2	(3) Alaska Aces	93–97	99–87	94–104	123–121 (OT)	97–94

==== Finals ====
Team 1	Series	Team 2	Game 1	Game 2	Game 3	Game 4	Game 5
(2) Rain or Shine Elasto Painters	2–3	(4) San Mig Super Coffee Mixers	101–104	89–87 (OT)	69–78	88–79	89–92

- Finals MVP: James Yap (San Mig Super Coffee)
- Best Player of the Conference: Ranidel de Ocampo (Talk 'N Text)
- Bobby Parks Best Import of the Conference: Arizona Reid (Rain or Shine)

== Individual awards ==
=== Leo Awards ===
- Most Valuable Player: June Mar Fajardo (San Miguel)
- Rookie of the Year: Greg Slaughter (Barangay Ginebra)
- First Mythical Team:
  - Jayson Castro (Talk 'N Text)
  - Mark Barroca (San Mig Super Coffee)
  - June Mar Fajardo (San Miguel)
  - Ranidel de Ocampo (Talk 'N Text)
  - Asi Taulava (Air21)
- Second Mythical Team:
  - Paul Lee (Rain or Shine)
  - PJ Simon (San Mig Super Coffee)
  - Greg Slaughter (Barangay Ginebra)
  - Marc Pingris (San Mig Super Coffee)
  - Sonny Thoss (Alaska)
- All-Defensive Team:
  - Mark Barroca (San Mig Super Coffee)
  - Gabe Norwood (Rain or Shine)
  - June Mar Fajardo (San Miguel)
  - Jireh Ibañes (Rain or Shine)
  - Marc Pingris (San Mig Super Coffee)
- Most Improved Player: June Mar Fajardo (San Miguel)
- Sportsmanship Award: Willie Miller (Barako Bull)

=== Awards given by the PBA Press Corps ===
- Defensive Player of the Year: Marc Pingris (San Mig Super Coffee)
- Scoring Champion: Jayson Castro (Talk 'N Text)
- Baby Dalupan Coach of the Year: Tim Cone (San Mig Super Coffee)
- Mr. Quality Minutes: PJ Simon (San Mig Super Coffee)
- Comeback Player of the Year: Asi Taulava (Air21)
- Danny Floro Executive of the Year: Ramon S. Ang
- Order of Merit: Mark Barroca (San Mig Super Coffee)
- All-Rookie Team
  - Greg Slaughter (Barangay Ginebra)
  - Ian Sangalang (San Mig Super Coffee)
  - Justin Melton (San Mig Super Coffee)
  - Terrence Romeo (GlobalPort)
  - Raymond Almazan (Rain or Shine)

== Cumulative standings ==
Pos	Team	Pld	W	L	PCT	Best finish
1	Talk 'N Text Tropang Texters	49	33	16	.673	Finalist
2	Rain or Shine Elasto Painters	61	37	24	.607	Finalist
3	Petron Blaze Boosters/San Miguel Beermen	42	25	17	.595	Semifinalist
4	San Mig Super Coffee Mixers	71	41	30	.577	Champions
5	Barangay Ginebra San Miguel	43	23	20	.535	Semifinalist
6	Alaska Aces	44	22	22	.500	Semifinalist
7	Meralco Bolts	36	14	22	.389	Quarterfinalist
8	Air21 Express	40	15	25	.375	Semifinalist
9	Barako Bull Energy	35	10	25	.286	Quarterfinalist
10	GlobalPort Batang Pier	33	7	26	.212	Quarterfinalist

=== Elimination rounds ===
Pos	Team	Pld	W	L	PCT
1	Talk 'N Text Tropang Texters	32	24	8	.750
2	Rain or Shine Elasto Painters	32	22	10	.688 (Note: Elimination round head-to-head record: Rain or Shine 2–1 San Miguel)
3	Petron Blaze Boosters/San Miguel Beermen	32	22	10	.688
4	Barangay Ginebra San Miguel	32	19	13	.594
5	Alaska Aces	32	16	16	.500 (Note: Elimination round head-to-head record: Alaska 3–1 San Mig)
6	San Mig Super Coffee Mixers	32	16	16	.500
7	Meralco Bolts	32	13	19	.406
8	Air21 Express	32	11	21	.344
9	Barako Bull Energy	32	10	22	.313
10	GlobalPort Batang Pier	32	7	25	.219

=== Playoffs ===
Pos	Team	Pld	W	L
1	San Mig Super Coffee Mixers	39	25	14
2	Rain or Shine Elasto Painters	29	15	14
3	Talk 'N Text Tropang Texters	17	9	8
4	Alaska Aces	12	6	6
5	Barangay Ginebra San Miguel	11	4	7
6	Air21 Express	8	4	4
7	Petron Blaze Boosters/San Miguel Beermen	10	3	7
8	Meralco Bolts	4	1	3
9	GlobalPort Batang Pier	1	0	1
10	Barako Bull Energy	3	0	3
