= 1989 PBA All-Star Game =

Veterans	Rookies-Sophomores
132	130
	1	2	3	4	Total
Veterans	35	24	40	33	132
Rookies-Sophomores	21	38	34	37	130
- Date: June 4, 1989
- Venue: The ULTRA, Pasig
- MVP: Boy Cabahug
- Network: Vintage Sports (PTV)

The 1989 PBA All-Star Game is the first all-star weekend of the Philippine Basketball Association (PBA), coinciding the 1989 PBA season.

== Background ==
PBA Commissioner Rudy Salud organized the league's first all-star game to showcase the younger players that have joined the league from 1988 and 1989, who became standouts in their respective teams against the veteran players, who are mostly in the league since its founding in 1975.

Before 1989, exhibition games were held in the provinces, notably in 1982, where the league's players from Luzon (named North All-Stars) were pitted against the league's players from Visayas and Mindanao (South All-Stars) in Cebu.

== All-Star Game ==
=== Coaches ===
Dante Silverio of Formula Shell Zoom Masters and Baby Dalupan of Purefoods Hotdogs were selected as the head coaches of the Veterans' and Rookies-Sophomores teams respectively. Both coaches were at the helm during the Crispa-Toyota rivalry, where Silverio coached the Toyota Super Corollas and Dalupan coached the Crispa Redmanizers.

=== Rosters ===
Rookies-Sophomores
Pos	Player	Team
Starters
G	Jojo Lastimosa	Purefoods Hotdogs
G	Ronnie Magsanoc	Formula Shell Zoom Masters
C	Benjie Paras	Formula Shell Zoom Masters
F	Alvin Patrimonio	Purefoods Hotdogs
F	Paul Alvarez	Alaska Milkmen
Reserves
G	Elmer Cabahug	Alaska Milkmen
G	Dindo Pumaren	Purefoods Hotdogs
C	Jerry Codiñera	Purefoods Hotdogs
F	Nelson Asaytono	Purefoods Hotdogs
F	Romeo dela Rosa	Formula Shell Zoom Masters
F	Bobby Jose	San Miguel Beermen
C	Zaldy Realubit	Presto Tivolis
Head coach: Dante Silverio (Formula Shell Zoom Masters)

Veterans
Pos	Player	Team
Starters
G	Allan Caidic	Presto Tivolis
G	Hector Calma	San Miguel Beermen
C	Ramon Fernandez	San Miguel Beermen
F	Yves Dignadice	San Miguel Beermen
F	Samboy Lim	San Miguel Beermen
Reserves
G	Arnie Tuadles	Formula Shell Zoom Masters
G	Robert Jaworski	Añejo Rum 65ers
C	Manny Victorino	Presto Tivolis
F	Philip Cezar	Añejo Rum 65ers
F	Elmer Reyes	San Miguel Beermen
G	Joey Loyzaga	Añejo Rum 65ers
F	Elpidio Villamin	Alaska Milkmen
Head coach: Baby Dalupan (Purefoods Hotdogs)

=== Game ===
Vintage Sports (PTV)

June 4
6:20 p.m.

Veterans 132, Rookies-Sophomores 130
Scoring by quarter: 35–21, 24–38, 40–34, 33–37
Pts: Ramon Fernandez 20	Pts: Boy Cabahug 24
Boy Cabahug was named the game's most valuable player.

The ULTRA, Pasig, Metro Manila
