= 1979 Crispa Redmanizers season =

- Head coach: Baby Dalupan
- Owner(s): P. Floro and Sons, Inc.

All Filipino Conference results
- Record: 22–5 (81.5%)
- Place: 1st
- Playoff finish: Finals

Open Conference results
- Record: 15–11 (57.7%)
- Place: 4th
- Playoff finish: Semifinals

Invitational Conference results
- Record: 5–4 (55.6%)
- Place: 2nd
- Playoff finish: Finals

Crispa Redmanizers seasons

The 1979 Crispa Redmanizers season was the 5th season of the franchise in the Philippine Basketball Association (PBA). It was known as Walk Tall Jeans in the Third Conference.

== Colors ==
Crispa Redmanizers (All-Filipino and Open Conferences)
(dark)
(light)
Crispa Redmanizers (Invitational Conference)
(dark)
(light)
Walk Tall Jeans (Invitational Conference)
(dark)
(light)

== Notable dates ==
May 19: Fortunato "Atoy" Co became the first PBA player to score 5,000 points by pouring in 37 points in Crispa's 119-110 win over Tanduay.

June 21: Crispa defeats Toyota in a semifinal game, 172-142, as Atoy Co scored 50 points while Abe King of Toyota set the record for the conference highest total output of 60 points.

== Summary ==
The Crispa Redmanizers were tied with defending champion Toyota Tamaraws on top of the standings after 16 games in the eliminations with a 14–2 won-loss slate. In the four-team semifinal round, the Redmanizers easily won their first two assignments against Tanduay and Filmanbank before losing to Toyota in the battle of unbeaten teams in the first round of the semifinals. Five days later, Crispa sealed a finals showdown with Toyota as the Tamaraws gave away the contest in losing 142-172 to the Redmanizers. Both teams had a 4-1 card going into the last playing date of the semifinals. Crispa won their last game against winless Filmanbank to finish with five wins and one loss.

After a crownless season last year and a two-year absence of the league's most notable rivalry, Crispa and Toyota once again played against each other for the All-Filipino Conference finals. On July 7, the Crispa Redmanizers wins the All-Filipino crown and clinch their seventh league title by defeating Toyota Tamaraws, 118-111, in the deciding fifth game to win the series, 3 games to 2.

The Redmanizers opted again for Cyrus Mann, along with former Los Angeles Laker Cornell Warner, as their imports for the Open Conference. Warner played only in the first round of eliminations since he was bothered by a leg injury, his replacement was Irvin Chatman, who never got to play at once because of a sprained ankle. Crispa finish third in the eliminations with an 11-5 won-loss card, behind RTO's 13-3 and Toyota's 12-4. After posting two victories against a lone defeat in the first round of the semifinals, the Redmanizers lost twice in succession to Toyota and Royal and despite the 155–127 win over Great Taste in their last outing on October 25, the Toyota Tamaraws shut the door on Crispa's finals hopes with a win over first finalist Royal Tru-Orange later that night. Crispa lost to Great Taste in their playoff for third place with Cyrus Mann out as team owner Danny Floro announced they was sacking their import for the past four seasons.

Known as Walk Tall Jeans in the Invitational championship, the ballclub got Bernard Harris from Tanduay as their import to team up with Irvin Chatman and they made it to the finals against old rival Toyota Tamaraws. The Jeansmakers won Game One of the title series but lost the next three games to settle for runner-up trophy.

== Award ==
Fortunato "Atoy" Co, Jr. won the Most Valuable Player (MVP) trophy in a closely fought and controversial race between him and Toyota center Ramon Fernandez for the prestigious award.

== Roster ==
Crispa Redmanizers roster
Players
Coaches

Pos.	No.	Nat.	Name	Ht.	Wt.
C	5	(Philippines)	Abet Guidaben	6 ft 5 in (1.96 m)		USJ–R
G	6	(Philippines)	Fortunato Co, Jr	6 ft 1 in (1.85 m)		Mapúa
F	7	(Philippines)	Rodolfo Soriano	6 ft 2 in (1.88 m)		UE
C	8	(Philippines)	Jaime Javier	6 ft 5 in (1.96 m)		José Rizal
G	9	(Philippines)	Gregorio Dionisio	5 ft 9 in (1.75 m)		Adamson
G/F	10	(Philippines)	Freddie Hubalde	6 ft 1 in (1.85 m)		Mapúa
G/F	11	(Philippines)	Bogs Adornado	6 ft 1 in (1.85 m)		UST
G/F	12	(Philippines)	Virgilio Dela Cruz	6 ft 3 in (1.91 m)		Mapúa
G	14	(Philippines)	Luis Varela	6 ft 1 in (1.85 m)		UE
G	15	(Philippines)	Bernie Fabiosa	5 ft 9 in (1.75 m)		UE
F	18	(Philippines)	Philip Cezar	6 ft 3 in (1.91 m)		José Rizal
F	24	(Philippines)	Filomeno Gulfin	6 ft 2 in (1.88 m)		Southwestern-U
C	27	(United States)	Cyrus Mann (I)	6 ft 10 in (2.08 m)		Illinois State
G	34	(Philippines)	Edmundo Espinosa	5 ft 9 in (1.75 m)		Southwestern-U
F/C	42	(United States)	Cornell Warner (I)	6 ft 9 in (2.06 m)		Jackson State
F	42	(United States)	Bernie Harris (I)	6 ft 10 in (2.08 m)		VCU
F	55	(United States)	Irving Chatman (I)	6 ft 9 in (2.06 m)		Rhode Island

Head coach

- (Philippines) Baby Dalupan

Assistant coach(es)

Legend

- (C) Team captain
- (I) Import
- Injured
