= Willie Marcial =

Filipino sports executive

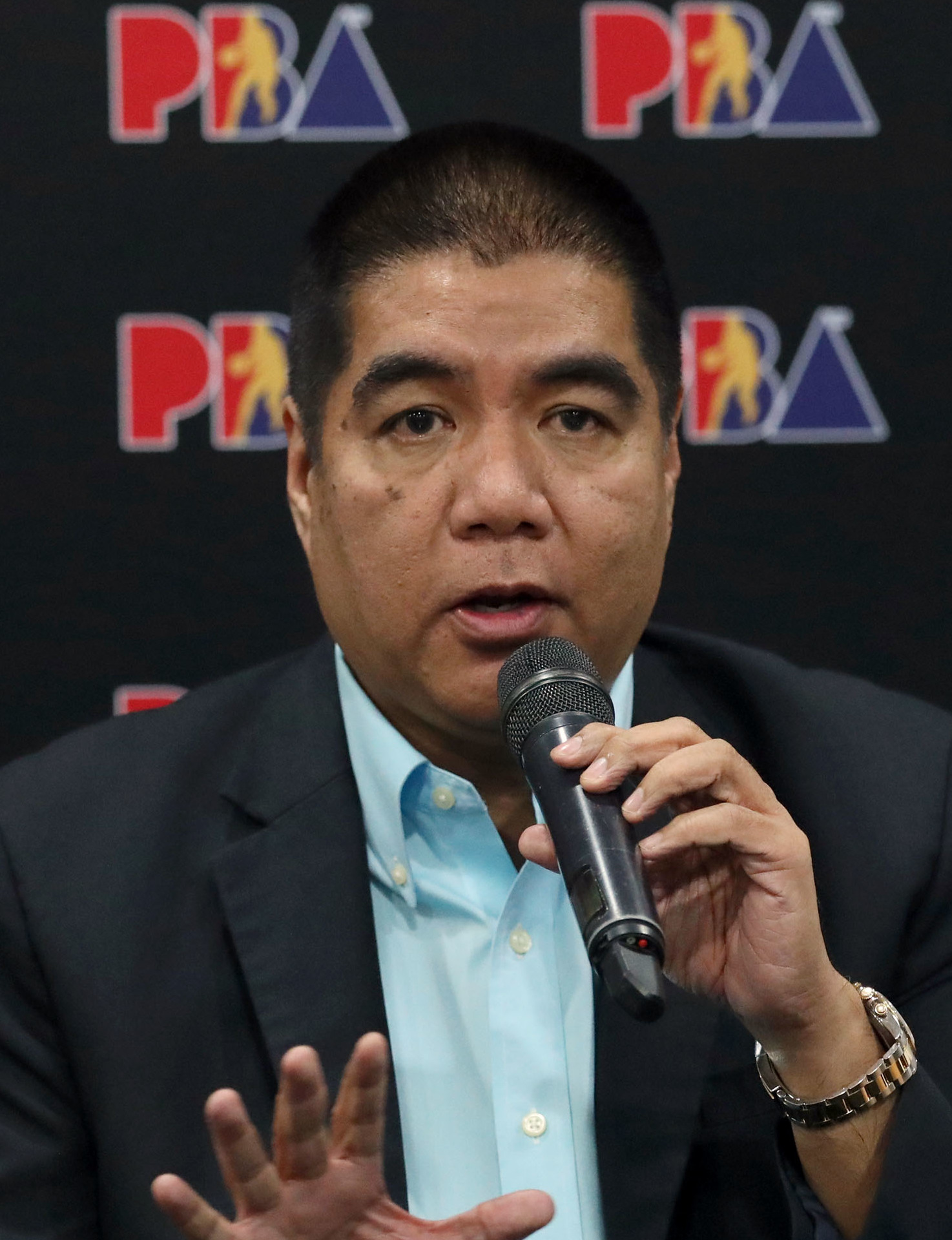
- Marcial in 2018

10th Commissioner of the PBA
- Incumbent
- Assumed office January 25, 2018
- Preceded by: Chito Narvasa

Personal details
- Born: October 12, 1961 (age 64)
- Occupation: Sports executive, businessman

Wilfrido "Willie" O. Marcial (born October 12, 1961) is a Filipino sports executive who serves as the tenth commissioner of the Philippine Basketball Association. He became the league's officer-in-charge after Chito Narvasa resigned on December 31, 2017. On January 25, 2018, he was appointed by the PBA Board of Governors as the 10th commissioner of the league.

== PBA career ==
Marcial, a native of Batangas, started as a statistician in 1983 during the time of former PBA Commissioner Leo Prieto. He also worked with the league's former TV partner, Vintage Television, as a floor director and also became a co-head statistician (alongside current head statistician Fidel Mangonon III) before being appointed as the league's Media Bureau Chief and Special Assistant to the Commissioner in 2003 during the time of former commissioner Noli Eala.

He is contracted to be the PBA commissioner until the end of the 2026–27 PBA season.

Preceded by Chito Narvasa	PBA Commissioner; 2018–present	Incumbent
