= 1979 Toyota Tamaraws season =

- Head coach: Dante Silverio; Fort Acuña
- Owner(s): Delta Motor Corporation

All-Filipino Conference results
- Record: 20–7 (74.1%)
- Place: 2nd
- Playoff finish: Finals

Open Conference results
- Record: 17–9 (65.4%)
- Place: 2nd
- Playoff finish: Finals

Invitational Conference results
- Record: 7–2 (77.8%)
- Place: 1st
- Playoff finish: Finals

Toyota Tamaraws seasons

The 1979 Toyota Tamaraws season was the fifth season of the franchise in the Philippine Basketball Association (PBA).

== Colors ==
(dark)
(light)

== Summary ==
The defending All-Filipino Conference champions had one new acquisition during the off-season, former University of Visayas cager Arnie Tuadles, taking the spot left by Fort Acuña, who retired to become coach Dante Silverio's assistant on the bench. The Tamaraws were tied with rival Crispa Redmanizers on top of the standings with 14 wins and 2 losses after 16 games. In the semifinal round, Toyota scored four straight victories to become the first team to enter the finals. On June 21, the Crispa Redmanizers formalized a return match with Toyota in the final playoffs after two years and six conferences with a 172-142 victory over the Tamaraws for their fourth win in five games on the night Atoy Co scored 50 points while Abe King of Toyota scored a season-high 60 points. The Tamaraws lost to Crispa in the championship series in five games.

Bruce "Sky" King return for Toyota in the Open Conference and his import partner was 6-8 Andrew Fields, a former standout of Pennsylvania's Cheyney College. Fields debut with 16 points in Toyota's 124-118 overtime win over Gilbey's Gin, which got a combined 89-point output from their two imports, Larry McNeill and Dean Tolson, in the opening game of the second conference on August 5. Toyota finish a game behind Royal Tru-Orange after the two-round eliminations with 12 wins and 4 losses. Toyota makes it to the championship round against RTO, who were led by imports Larry Pounds and Otto Moore. The Tamaraws ended up bridesmaid for the second straight conference by losing to the Orangemen in four games of the title series.

Three Toyota players namely Ramon Fernandez, Abe King and Ernesto Estrada skipped action in the round-robin of six teams in the Invitational championship, they were being sideline because of the disciplinary measures instituted by coach Dante Silverio, who felt the three did not play their best on several occasions in the second conference where Toyota lost in the finals to Royal. Despite their absence, the Tamaraws still made it to the championship for the third time in the season and played against rival Crispa Walk Tall Jeans. After the Tamaraws lost Game one by a whooping 28-point margin, the Toyota management decided to reactivate Fernandez, King and Estrada. Coach Dante Silverio resigned earlier in the day as both manager and coach upon learning on the management decision.

Toyota retains the crown they won from last season and avoided a repeat of three runner-up finishes back in 1976 by defeating Crispa Walk Tall Jeans in the finals series, 3 games to 1, winning Game four, 98-87 on December 15 for their 6th PBA title. The victory snapped Toyota's five straight finals losses to Crispa, they won the championship this time under new coach Fort Acuña.

== Notable dates ==
June 21: Abe King scored a conference-high 60 points in Toyota's 142-172 semifinal loss to Crispa. The 60-point output broke the previous record of 51 points set by Tony Torrente of RTO.

November 27: Francis Arnaiz became the second player to reach 5,000 career points in Toyota's 88-81 win over Royal Tru Orange.

December 11: Dante Silverio resigns as Toyota head coach after management reinstates Ramon Fernandez, Ernesto Estrada and Abe King in Game Two of the Invitational Conference finals.

== Awards ==
Arnie Tuadles was voted the season's Rookie of the year. Tuadles was also named in the mythical first team.

Ramon Fernandez lost out to Atoy Co in a close balloting for the season's Most Valuable Player award and settled for the mythical first team award along with Arnie Tuadles and Robert Jaworski.

== Roster ==
Toyota Tamaraws roster
Players

Pos.	#	POB	Name	Height	Weight	DOB (YYYY–MM–DD)	From
C	1	(United States)	Andrew Fields (I)	6 ft 8 in (2.03 m)			Cheyney
F	5	(Philippines)	Ernesto Estrada	5 ft 11 in (1.80 m)			Visayas
F/C	6	(Philippines)	Abe King	6 ft 3 in (1.91 m)			San Beda
G	7	(Philippines)	Robert Jaworski	6 ft 0 in (1.83 m)			UE
G	8	(Philippines)	Francis Arnaiz	5 ft 10 in (1.78 m)			Ateneo
F/C	10	(Philippines)	Ramon Fernandez	6 ft 4 in (1.93 m)			San Carlos
G/F	11	(Philippines)	Arnie Tuadles	6 ft 2 in (1.88 m)			Visayas
G	12	(Philippines)	Pablo Javier	5 ft 11 in (1.80 m)			Far Eastern
G/F	13	(Philippines)	Jesus Sta.Maria	5 ft 11 in (1.80 m)			José Rizal
G	14	(Philippines)	Rino Salazar	5 ft 9 in (1.75 m)			Letran
F	18	(Philippines)	Emerito Legaspi	5 ft 11 in (1.80 m)			UE
F	20	(Philippines)	Nicanor Bulaong	6 ft 3 in (1.91 m)			Far Eastern
F/C	111	(United States)	Bruce King (I)	6 ft 8 in (2.03 m)			Iowa

Coaches

Head coach

- (Philippines) Dante Silverio
- (Philippines) Fort Acuña

Assistant coach(es)

Legend

- (C) Team captain
- (I) Import
- Injured
