= Jun Bernardino =

Filipino sports executive and former commissioner of PBA (1947 – 2007)

- Bernardino in 2000

5th Commissioner of the PBA
- In office January 14, 1994 – December 31, 2002
- Preceded by: Rey Marquez
- Succeeded by: Noli Eala

Personal details
- Born: Emilio P. Bernardino, Jr. November 9, 1947 Philippines
- Died: March 3, 2007 (aged 59)
- Occupation: Sideline reporter, Sports executive

Emilio "Jun" Bernardino, Jr. (November 9, 1947 – March 24, 2007) was the fifth commissioner of the Philippine Basketball Association (PBA). He was elected as commissioner of the league in 1994 and retired in 2002. He served as the commissioner of the Shakey's V-League and of the 2006-07 season of the National Collegiate Athletic Association (Philippines).

== Early life ==
Bernardino was a member of the Ateneo de Manila High School Blue Eaglets basketball team. He played collegiate ball for the University of the Philippines, Diliman Fighting Maroons, and graduated with a degree in Sports Management.

== Career ==
=== Early days ===
Bernardino rose through the ranks of the Philippine Basketball Association during the 1970s and 1980s. At first, he was with the coverage team of Vintage Sports and later became the Executive Director of the league.

In 1994, he became the fifth commissioner of the PBA replacing Rey Marquez. Bernardino presided the league during the title reigns of the Sunkist Orange Juicers, Alaska Milkmen and resurgence of the Ginebra San Miguel franchise from 1994 to 1998.

=== Fil-Ams and Fil-Sham controversy ===
However, with the rise of the newly formed Metropolitan Basketball Association in 1998, a regional-based professional league, Bernardino implemented a direct Filipino-American (Fil-Am) rule for each team for the 1999 season. This led to easy signing of players such as Asi Taulava, Danny Seigle and Eric Menk. But, this led to the league entering into controversies of alleged fake Filipino-American players. The PBA had strict rules in which only Filipinos were allowed to play as locals, other nationalities were allowed to play as "imports" and only on designated tournaments, with teams only recruiting one import on their roster.

In 2000, rules were implemented on not allowing alleged Fil-Shams (non-Filipinos posing as Filipinos) to play until their cases are resolved. Two incidents happened during the season. The first one surrounded on-court controversy, as Tanduay fielded an already questioned fil-am Earl Sonny Alvarado in Games Two and Three of the All-Filipino Cup semifinal series against the Purefoods Tender Juicy Hotdogs, despite the league's warning. Without Alvarado in Game 1, the Rhum Masters won, and defeated Purefoods in Games 2 and 3 to sweep the series. However, with Alvarado found fake and was deported, Bernardino nullify Tanduay's two victories with Alvarado, resulting in a RTO order, later dropped, by team management.

Later that year, he suspended players indefinitely those who have not prove their Filipino citizenship that began in the 2000 Commissioners Cup. Those suspended were Danny Seigle, Chris Jackson, Rudy Hatfield and Menk, among others. However, Menk would suffer the worst as he spend more than a year to prove his case until the latter stages of the 2001 season.

=== Latter years ===
In Bernardino's latter years in the PBA, two expansion franchises, Tanduay and Red Bull entered the league in 1999 and 2000, respectively, bringing the league number from eight to 10. The San Miguel Beermen rose into power as the league's new dynasty, winning five titles in two seasons.

In 2001, Bernardino went through minor health problems and was forced to temporarily hand the reins to deputy commissioner Sonny Barrios to recuperate. In 2002, he announced that he was stepping aside as commissioner after the end of the season. His successor was Viva TV sports anchor and lawyer, Noli Eala.

=== After the PBA ===
In 2004, Bernardino, along with Ricky Palou and other former PBA executives, formed Sports Vision Management and was responsible for the formation of the school-themed Shakey's V-League that began in 2004.

In 2006, he was the commissioner of the 82nd NCAA season, the first time in four years he was commissioner of a basketball tournament.

He was also considered to be the executive director of the Samahang Basketbol ng Pilipinas.

=== Death ===
Jun Bernardino died at 1:30 a.m. on March 24, 2007 at the Makati Medical Center, from a heart attack after organizing a surprise birthday celebration for Philippine basketball pioneer Moying Martelino.

As a tribute to Bernardino, the league renamed the Perpetual Trophy, the award given to the champions of the PBA Philippine Cup as the Jun Bernardino Trophy. All 10 teams also worn a black patch in their uniforms during the 2007 PBA Fiesta Conference as a tribute while commemorating the life and times of the late commissioner in a tribute during the PBA Hall of Fame induction ceremony.

The Shakey's V-League also paid tribute to Bernardino during the opening rites of the tournament in May.

== See also ==
- Philippine Basketball Association

Preceded by Reynaldo Marquez	PBA Commissioner; 1993–2002	Succeeded by Jose Emmanuel Eala
Preceded by Joe Lipa	Philippine NCAA basketball Commissioner; 2006	Succeeded by Chito Narvasa
