= Rey Marquez =

Filipino basketball executive

4th Commissioner of the PBA
- In office January 10, 1992 – December 23, 1993
- Preceded by: Rudy Salud
- Succeeded by: Jun Bernardino

1st Chairman of the PBA Board of Governors
- In office 1987–1990
- Preceded by: Carlos Palanca III (as PBA president)
- Succeeded by: Luis "Moro" Lorenzo Sr.
- PBA Team: Formula Shell Zoom Masters

Personal details
- Born: Reynaldo Marquez; 1932 Philippines
- Died: November 11, 2018 (aged 85–86)
- Occupation: Sports executive

Reynaldo Marquez was the fourth commissioner of the Philippine Basketball Association. He also served as a member of the league's board of governors, representing Formula Shell before being appointed as commissioner.

== PBA Commissioner ==
Despite only lasting two seasons, Marquez made significant changes that continues to affect the league until today. Marquez changed the schedule of the All-Filipino Conference to the beginning of the season in what is now the Philippine Cup. Marquez also started the Commissioner's Cup and the Governor's Cup.

| Preceded by Rodrigo Salud | PBA Commissioner; 1992–1993 | Succeeded by Jun Bernardino |
