= Sonny Barrios =

Filipino basketball commissioner

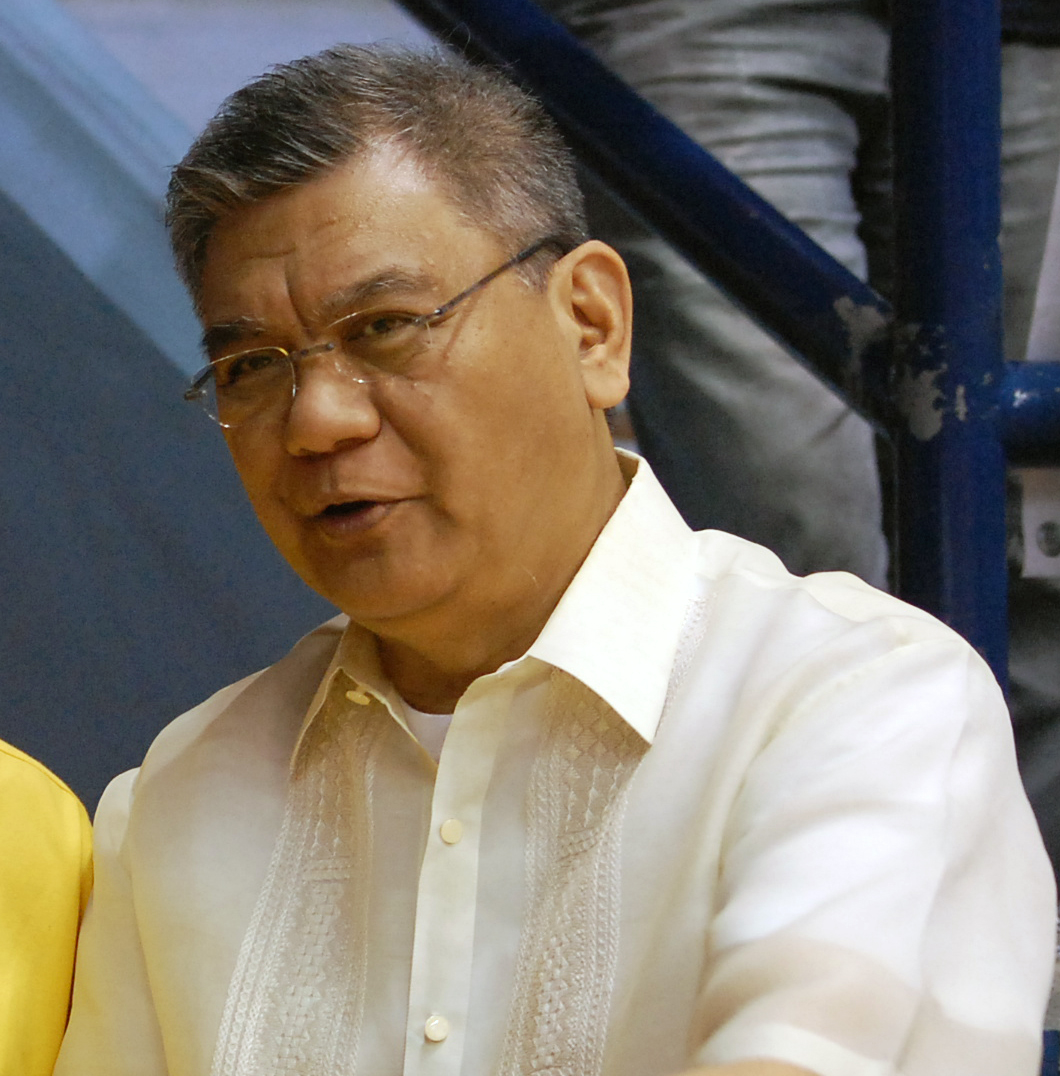
- Barrios in 2010

7th Commissioner of the PBA
- In office January 24, 2008 – August 26, 2010
- Preceded by: Noli Eala
- Succeeded by: Chito Salud

Personal details
- Born: Renauld N. Barrios Philippines
- Occupation: Sports executive

Renauld N. Barrios, better known as Sonny Barrios, is the seventh commissioner of the Philippine Basketball Association and the current executive director of Samahang Basketbol ng Pilipinas. Before serving as commissioner, he took on the role in an acting capacity in August 2007 when his predecessor Noli Eala resigned after being disbarred by the Supreme Court. He accepted his election as the commissioner on January 24, 2008, after a deadlock ensued between the league's governors that supported Atty. Chito Salud and Lambert Ramos. The board instead named Barrios as the commissioner.

In August 2010, it is announced that he will be replaced by deputy commissioner Chito Salud. The official turnover ceremony took place on August 26 at the PBA office.

Barrios was later named as the executive director of the Samahang Basketbol ng Pilipinas, the country's national basketball federation, on March 31, 2011, replacing Noli Eala. On January 8, 2024, he was replaced by Erika Dy as the executive director of SBP.

Preceded by Noli Eala	PBA Commissioner; 2008–2010	Succeeded by Chito Salud
