= Chito Narvasa =

Filipino lawyer, sports executive and basketball coach

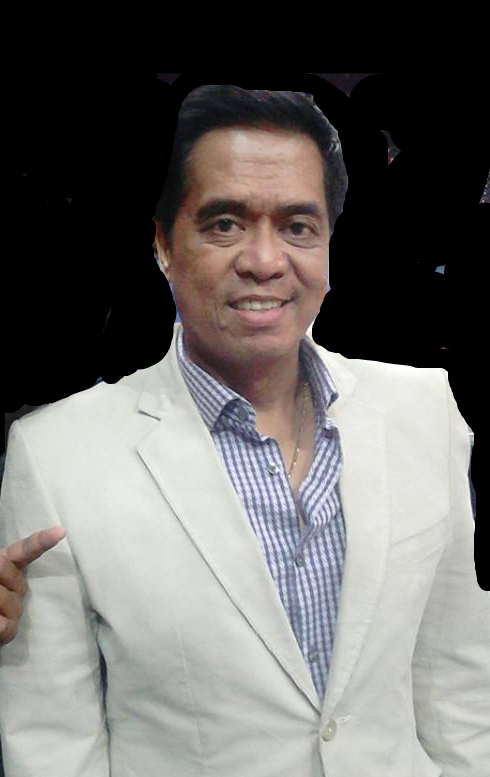

9th Commissioner of the PBA
- In office August 1, 2015 – December 31, 2017
- Preceded by: Chito Salud
- Succeeded by: Willie Marcial

Personal details
- Born: Andres Yuseco Narvasa Jr. October 18, 1956 (age 70)
- Education: Ateneo de Manila University
- Basketball career

Career information
- College: Ateneo
- Coaching career: 1989; 1992–1998

Career history

Coaching
- 1989: Ateneo
- 1992–1994: Purefoods/Coney Island (assistant)
- 1995–1998: Formula Shell Zoom Masters
- 1998: Purefoods Carne Norte Beefies

Career highlights
- As assistant coach: 2× PBA champion (1993 All-Filipino, 1994 Commissioner's)

Andres "Chito" Yuseco Narvasa Jr. (born October 18, 1956) is a Filipino business executive and former basketball player and coach. He is best known as the ninth commissioner of the Philippine Basketball Association (PBA).

== Personal life ==
He is the son of Andres Narvasa, a former Chief Justice of the Supreme Court of the Philippines, and Janina Yuseco. He is also the brother of former MBA and PBL commissioner Ogie Narvasa.

== Basketball ==
Narvasa, along with his brother, Ogie, played for the Ateneo Blue Eagles. The Narvasa brothers were also part of the Philippine national teams of 1977 and 1978. They jointly coached the Blue Eagles from the early to late 1980s.

Narvasa coached the Formula Shell and Purefoods franchises in the PBA from 1995 to 1998.

He was also the president of the Basketball Coaches Association of the Philippines (BCAP).

=== PBA Commissioner ===
On May 14, 2015, Narvasa was appointed as the ninth league commissioner via a unanimous 12–0 vote by the PBA Board of Governors. He took the post vacated by Chito Salud, who would serve as the first PBA president and chief executive officer (CEO). He officially took over from Salud on August 1, in time for the Rookie Draft of the 2015–16 PBA season.

On March 7, 2016, Narvasa was appointed as Chief Executive Officer of the PBA, replacing officer-in-charge Robert Non, which gave Narvasa a dual role as the CEO and commissioner of the league. However, CEO position was dissolved before the start of the 2016 Governors' Cup.

==== Notable changes and events ====
Narvasa's first order of business as commissioner was to look into league's officiating, which has been a source of controversy in the past years. Hours before the 2015 draft, he issued an order to teams disallowing trading of players and draft picks during draft day, but would be done in the next few days after the draft. Before the start of the 2015–16 PBA season, he introduced some changes in officiating, particularly on deliberate fouls, as well as adapting the referee substitution rule and FIBA's rule of 14-second shot clock reset after offensive boards.

During his tenure, the PBA broke its game attendance records for a finals game. games five, six and seven of the 2017 Governors' Cup finals between Barangay Ginebra San Miguel and the Meralco Bolts were all held at the Philippine Arena. On October 22, 2017, game 5 set the all-time PBA finals attendance record of 36,445, breaking the previous record of 23,436 fans during game 3 of the 2013 Commissioner's Cup between Alaska and Barangay Ginebra. The game 5 record was later broken three days later on October 25 as 53,642 fans watched game 6 of the Governors' Cup ginals. The record also broke the all-time PBA attendance record of 52,612, set during the opening of the 2014–15 season on October 19, 2014. The record was surpassed on October 27, 2017, during game 7 of the Governors' Cup finals as 54,086 fans watched the series-clinching game between Barangay Ginebra and Meralco.

==== Controversies ====
Narvasa has been the center of numerous controversies since the start of his tenure as commissioner.

He handed an indefinite ban on SPIN.ph beat reporter Snow Badua after the latter wrote an article and posted Twitter tweets accusing Barangay Ginebra San Miguel team governor and close friend Alfrancis Chua for having an extramarital affair with model Abby Poblador. In his letter to Badua, “It has come to my attention that you had used different media platforms to malign, embarrass and mortify a person of authority of this association. Your incessant attacks on Twitter on Mr. Alfrancis Chua, team governor of Ginebra San Miguel, has caused distress, embarrassment and disharmony with his family”. His ban on Badua angered many journalists, accusing him as violating press freedom using his power as commissioner.

In November 2015, when asked by reporters about Mahindra Enforcers playing-coach Manny Pacquiao's no-show during the Alaska-Mahindra overseas game in Dubai, he quoted as saying that Pacquiao was feeling under the weather, has had prior engagements, and that he is not a basketball player but a boxer, yet he still acknowledged Pacquiao's value to the league as a sports personality who can draw crowds to the game. Such comments he gave to Dubai-based Gulf News angered Mahindra team consultant Joe Lipa, who defended Pacquiao and accused Narvasa's remarks as degrading and uncalled for. Narvasa made a mandatory summon over Lipa's remarks, but Lipa did not honor it. As a consequence, he suspended Lipa from attending Mahindra games.

He was also accused of power play by his predecessor, Chito Salud, when the latter announced his resignation as president and CEO and revealed the reason behind his resignation. According to sources of Spin.ph, Narvasa bypassed Salud in handing down key decisions, primarily the banning of Badua and Lipa.

On December 5, 2015, Ginebra team governor Alfrancis Chua was caught vaping inside the arena on national television, which prompted the Department of Health and other anti-smoking advocates to talk to Commissioner Narvasa regarding his unhealthy and unethical actions. As a result of the incident, Narvasa only admonished Chua, but gave him a warning, after the latter apologized for his actions.

On December 29, 2015, he handed down bans on both referees Edward Aquino and Rommel Gruta for the rest of the PBA Philippine Cup conference, even when the two officials admitted lapse on officiating - a non-call on a supposed five-second violation and a stepping infraction on GlobalPort guard Stanley Pringle in the final play of an 84–83 overtime win over Ginebra two days before.

During Narvasa's tenure as commissioner he issued fines from violating coaches and players, from small violations such as pulling down shorts during the game to severe technical fouls, more than his predecessors. He is also known on pointing fingers, notably at Dondon Hontiveros during a scuffle in the GlobalPort-Alaska semifinals game in the 2015-16 Philippine Cup. The game also had 16 technical fouls called, the most in any single PBA game in history.

Narvasa hastily issued a lifetime ban on TNT import Ivan Johnson on February 13, 2016, after Johnson cursed Narvasa as the former was leaving the playing court after being ejected for incurring his second flagrant foul penalty one at the 2nd quarter of their game against Meralco during the 2016 Commissioner's Cup. The decision was announced during the game's halftime break. The penalty was downgraded into a season ban and P150,000 after Johnson voluntarily appeared on February 17 before Commissioner Narvasa and personally apologized for the infraction during the TNT-Meralco game.

On March 31, 2016, Narvasa issued a memorandum order that prevent players who have boy-cut hairdos to play in the PBA Women's 3x3 Basketball tournament, the memorandum has received negative feedback from the players and the Gabriela's women's group for being "discriminatory". Commissioner Narvasa defended the league's decision to ban boy-cut hairdos in the women's league.

On October 27, 2017, Narvasa approved the trade proposal that sent Kia Picanto's first round pick (first overall) in the 2017 draft, which is used to draft Christian Standhardinger, in exchange of Ronald Tubid, Jay-R Reyes, Rashawn McCarthy and San Miguel's 2019 first round draft, with minimal revisions from the original trade proposal that originally involving Keith Agovida, Reyes, McCarthy and a San Miguel draft pick. The trade proposal already earned the ire of the fans as well as Wilfred Steven Uytengsu, team owner of the Alaska Aces, and Dioceldo Sy, team owner of the Blackwater Elite, since Kia is trading their opportunity to pick a potential starter in exchange of role players.

In defense of approving the controversial Kia-San Miguel trade, Narvasa cited that TNT KaTropa also tried to make a deal with Kia's first round pick. Narvasa also stated that TNT's manager Magnum Membrere submitted draft application papers on behalf of Standhardinger, even if Standhardinger already submitted his own papers three weeks before the September 4 draft application deadline for Fil-foreign applicants.

TNT management then released a statement hours after the 2017 draft concluded, blasting Narvasa for being biased and questioned his credibility as the league's commissioner. TNT also clarified that the actions done by Magnum Membrere when submitting Standhardinger's draft application papers were done as the representative of Gilas Pilipinas.

==== 2017 leadership crisis ====
On November 2, 2017, seven members of the PBA Board of Governors passed a resolution stating that they will no longer support or endorse the renewal of Narvasa's tenure as commissioner due to "loss of confidence". Representatives from Alaska, Blackwater, Meralco, NLEX, Rain or Shine, Phoenix and TNT attended a special board meeting on November 2 that passed this resolution. According to the passed resolution, Deputy Commissioner and Technical Head Rickie Santos will be the league's officer-in-charge while the board will still tackle who will replace Narvasa as commissioner. The group also reached out to the five teams that were unable to attend the meeting but they received no response from their team governors.

Later in the afternoon, the bloc that composes the three San Miguel Corporation (SMC) teams (San Miguel Beermen, Barangay Ginebra San Miguel and Star Hotshots), as well as independent teams GlobalPort Batang Pier and Kia Picanto, issued a statement for their continued support for Narvasa.

Former PBA chairman Robert Non in a statement criticized the move done by the seven board members for making a "whimsical" decision in ousting Narvasa and mentioned that the move was unauthorized and non-binding as per the league's by-laws. According to the PBA by-laws, a two-thirds vote (eight out of twelve) of its current membership is necessary to remove or appoint a commissioner. Non also criticized the timing of the meeting as the notice was only sent to all board representatives on Monday, October 30. According to the rules, the board representatives should have been notified seven days before the date of the meeting.

Narvasa later called a press conference at the PBA office in Libis and indicated that he will not step down and "will fight for the Office of the Commissioner". He is also requesting the seven teams that will not endorse his term renewal to explain the grounds of their "loss of confidence" to the current commissioner. He also stated that he is willing to resign the commissioner post, but after consultation with his family and lawyers, he will hold on as commissioner, given that any move to oust him should follow the rules stated in the league's by-laws.

In response, the seven teams that met on November 2, issued a statement the following day to clarify that they did not move to remove Narvasa as the commissioner, but they only stated that they would not support a renewal of his tenure, which expired at the end of the 2016–17 season. The statement also said that Narvasa is clearly aware that his term renewal is on a yearly basis as indicated to the Meeting Minutes of the Board and upon assuming the COO (commissioner) post in 2015. The action the seven governors made on November 2 is to prevent Narvasa's re-appointment, which needs two-thirds votes (8 out of 12), which obviously Narvasa will not get given the non-support of the majority.

==== Resignation and transition ====
Narvasa submitted his resignation letter, hours before the opening of the 2017–2018 PBA season on December 17, 2017. The board however asked Narvasa to stay until December 31, 2017, to have a smooth transition to his successor. PBA media bureau chief Willie Marcial will serve as officer-in-charge effective January 1, 2018, until Narvasa's successor will be named. Marcial eventually became the tenth commissioner of the PBA on January 25, 2018.

== Corporate career ==
In addition to his involvement in the Philippines' basketball scene, Narvasa is also an expert in the field of finance. He served as the chief trader in various firms in the United States in the '80s, after which he came back to the Philippines to serve as an executive in multiple financial firms. He was also a lecturer at the Ateneo BAP - Institute of Banking from 1996 to 2003. In the year 2000, he put up his own consultancy firm, the AYN Resource Management Group where he served as the president and CEO. He also served as the Vice-Chairman and CEO of Citystate Savings Bank from 2014 to 2015, after which he became PBA Commissioner.

After his time as the Commissioner of the PBA, Narvasa returned to his executive duties as the president and CEO of AYN Resource Management Group. In August 2018, he was appointed by President Rodrigo Duterte as part of the board of directors of United Coconut Planters Bank (UCPB). He was the former president of UCPB General Insurance Company, Inc. (COCOGEN) serving from May 2019 to June 2020.

Preceded by Fritz Gaston	Ateneo Blue Eagles head coach 1989	Succeeded by Chot Reyes
Preceded by Joe Lipa	Formula Shell head coach 1995–1998	Succeeded by Perry Ronquillo
Preceded by Eric Altamirano	Purefoods TJ Hotdogs head coach 1998	Succeeded by Derrick Pumaren
Preceded by Jun Bernardino	Philippine NCAA basketball commissioner 2007	Succeeded by Joe Lipa
Preceded by Ed Cordero	UAAP basketball commissioner 2008	Succeeded by Joe Lipa
Preceded by Chito Salud	PBA Commissioner; 2015–2017	Succeeded by Willie Marcial
