= Mariano Yenko =

Philippines basketball executive

2nd Commissioner of the PBA
- In office January 1983 – December 1987
- Deputy: Tommy Manotoc (1985-1986)
- Preceded by: Leo Prieto
- Succeeded by: Rodrigo Salud

Personal details
- Born: Mariano Quijano Yenko Jr. Philippines
- Education: Ateneo de Manila University
- Occupation: Sports executive

Colonel Mariano Quijano Yenko Jr. was the second commissioner of the Philippine Basketball Association. He served as the Defense Assistant Executive Secretary under Executive Secretary Fred Ruiz Castro and Philippine President Ramon Magsaysay, and Undersecretary under Carlos P. Garcia, and as Philippine Airlines' Vice-President Corporate Secretary. The Ateneo de Manila University's Audio-Visual Room at the Moro Lorenzo Sports Complex was named after him. His son Ignatius Yenko served as PBA's Chairman and as PLDT's First Vice President.

== PBA Commissioner ==
Yenko became the second PBA commissioner in 1983 and under his term the PBA entered its second phase, the post-EDSA era after the disbandment of Crispa-Toyota. Yenko managed to turn around the league's fortunes by popularizing the Ginebra San Miguel team during his tenure. Revenue remained strong and the PBA welcomed new legends such as Allan Caidic to carry the new generation. He was succeeded as the Commissioner by Rodrigo Salud during the start of PBA's 1988 season.

== Awards and honors ==
Yenko was posthumously inducted into the Philippine Basketball Association Hall of Fame in 2011.

Preceded by Leo Prieto	PBA Commissioner; 1983–1987	Succeeded by Rodrigo Salud
