= Carlos Terry =

American basketball player (1956–1989)

- Terry as a member of the Washington Bullets

Personal information
- Born: June 22, 1956 Lexington, North Carolina, U.S.
- Died: March 12, 1989 (aged 32)
- Listed height: 6 ft 5 in (1.96 m)
- Listed weight: 210 lb (95 kg)

Career information
- High school: Lexington (Lexington, North Carolina)
- College: Winston-Salem State (1974–1978)
- NBA draft: 1978: 5th round, 104th overall pick
- Drafted by: Los Angeles Lakers
- Playing career: 1978–1983
- Position: Shooting guard
- Number: 12

Career history
- 1978: Allentown Jets
- 1978: Toyota Super Corollas
- 1979–1980: Lehigh Valley Jets
- 1980–1983: Washington Bullets
- 1983: Albuquerque Silvers

Career highlights
- PBA champion (1978 Invitational); All-CBA Second Team (1980); 2× NAIA All-American (1977, 1978); CIAA Player of the Year (1978); 3× All-CIAA (1976–1978)
- Stats at NBA.com
- Stats at Basketball Reference

Carlos Fernando Terry (June 22, 1956 – March 12, 1989) was an American professional basketball shooting guard who spent three seasons in the National Basketball Association (NBA) with the Washington Bullets. He played college basketball at Winston-Salem State University.

== Early years ==
Terry attended Lexington Senior High School. He accepted a basketball scholarship from then-Division II Winston-Salem State University, to play under legendary coach Clarence "Big House" Gaines. As a freshman, he was the team's sixth man. As a sophomore, he was named a starter at forward.

As a senior, he averaged 20.9 points and 10.7 rebounds per game, while leading the team to the 1977 CIAA Men's Basketball Championship. He received CIAA Player of the Year and CIAA All-Tournament Team honors.

He appeared in 115 games, averaging 18.7 points and 11.8 rebounds. He finished as the school's all-time leader in rebounds (1,467) and ranked third in points scored (2,151).

In 2001, he was inducted into the WSSU C.E. “Big House” Gaines Athletic Hall of Fame. In 2005, he was inducted into the CIAA 60th Anniversary All-Tournament team. In 2009, he was inducted into the CIAA Athletic Hall of Fame. He was named one of the CIAA's "60 Greatest Players".

While enrolled at WSSU, Terry became an active member of the Kappa (undergraduate) chapter of Iota Phi Theta fraternity.

== Professional career ==
Terry was selected by Los Angeles Lakers in the fifth round (104^{th} overall) of the 1978 NBA draft. He played at center in the summer league and struggled before being cut on September 14, 1978.

He then took his talents to the Philippine Basketball Association (PBA) where he played for the popular Toyota team, which he led to a conference championship (1978 PBA Invitational Conference).

In 1978, he signed with the Allentown Jets in the Continental Basketball Association, missing seven weeks of the season when he got hit in the mouth by an opponent elbow that broke his jaw. He played for the Lehigh Valley Jets of the CBA during the 1979–80 season and was selected to the All-CBA Second Team.

On September 8, 1980, after tryouts with a half dozen NBA teams, he was signed as a free agent by the Washington Bullets. He averaged 7.2 points and 4.5 rebounds per game, suffering a torn cruciate ligament in his left knee and was placed on the injured reserve list.

In the 1981–82 season, he contributed the Bullets qualifying for the playoffs and reaching the East Conference Semifinals. He was released on October 28, 1982. He was re-signed on November 16. Although he measured at 6 feet 5, he played center and forward for three seasons. He wasn't re-signed after the season.

In October 1983, he signed with the Louisville Catbirds of the Continental Basketball Association, before being released on November 20. On November 22, 1983, he signed with the Albuquerque Silvers of the Continental Basketball Association.

== Personal life ==
After his playing career, Terry dealt with alcohol and drugs issues, culminating with a drug conviction. Terry, intending on correcting course, expressed hope of "learning from mistakes and starting over." He refocused his efforts by working with children with disabilities and/or mental health issues at the National Children's Center in early 1988, as well as serving food for a Metro Health Association program at the Capital City Inn, a D.C. homeless shelter.

On March 12, 1989 (at the age of 32), he was killed in a car accident on the Capital Beltway in Prince George's County, Maryland. Police said that alcohol and speed were contributing factors.

== Career statistics ==
Legend
GP	Games played	GS	Games started	MPG	Minutes per game
FG%	Field goal percentage	3P%	3-point field goal percentage	FT%	Free throw percentage
RPG	Rebounds per game	APG	Assists per game	SPG	Steals per game
BPG	Blocks per game	PPG	Points per game	**Bold**	Career high

=== NBA ===
==== Regular season ====
Year	Team	GP	GS	MPG	FG%	3P%	FT%	RPG	APG	SPG	BPG	PPG
1980–81	Washington	26		**19.4**	**.500**	.000	.667	**4.5**	**2.7**	**1.0**	**.5**	**7.2**
1981–82	Washington	13	0	4.6	.200	.000	**.750**	.9	.6	.2	.1	.7
1982–83	Washington	**55**	**3**	9.3	.368	.000	.667	1.8	.8	.4	.2	1.6
Career		94	3	11.5	.434	.000	.672	2.4	1.3	.6	.3	3.0

==== Playoffs ====
Year	Team	GP	MPG	FG%	3P%	FT%	RPG	APG	SPG	BPG	PPG
1982	Washington	3	1.7	–	–	–	.3	.0	.0	.0	.0
