= Salud (sculpture) =

Statue by Jim Demetro

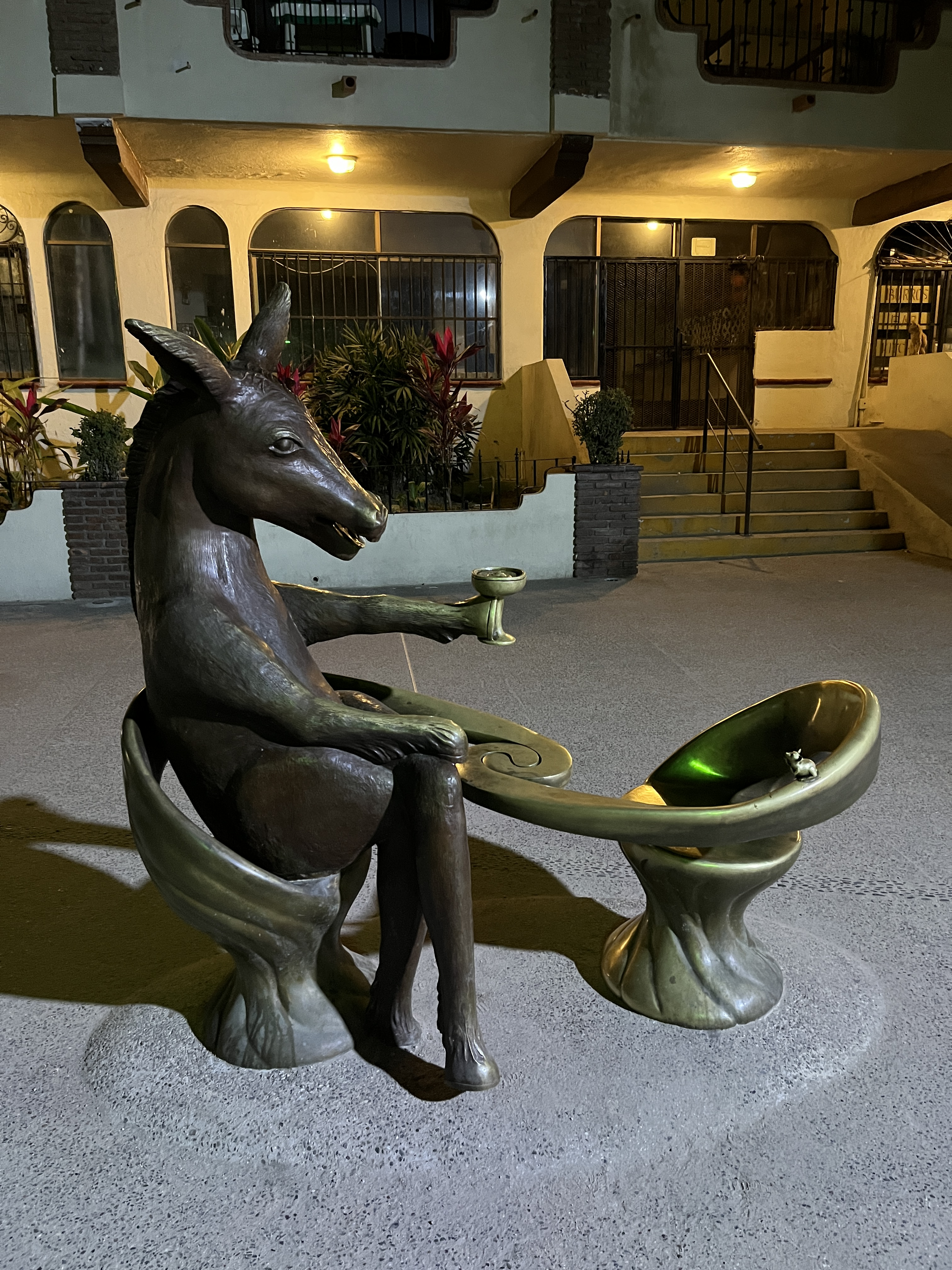
- The sculpture at night, 2024
- Artist: Jim Demetro
- Medium: Bronze sculpture
- Location: Puerto Vallarta, Jalisco, Mexico; 20°36′12″N 105°14′17″W

Salud is a bronze sculpture by Jim Demetro, installed in Puerto Vallarta's Zona Romántica, in the Mexican state of Jalisco.

== Description and history ==
Installed in 2023, the work depicts a donkey sitting in a chair and drinking a margarita. It is 1.8 meters tall and 1.7 meters wide.

Friends and family members of Demetro were present at the statue's unveiling, as were municipal officials and members of the Vallarta Institute of Culture's Governing Board.

Statuettes in Demetro Galeria, Puerto Vallarta

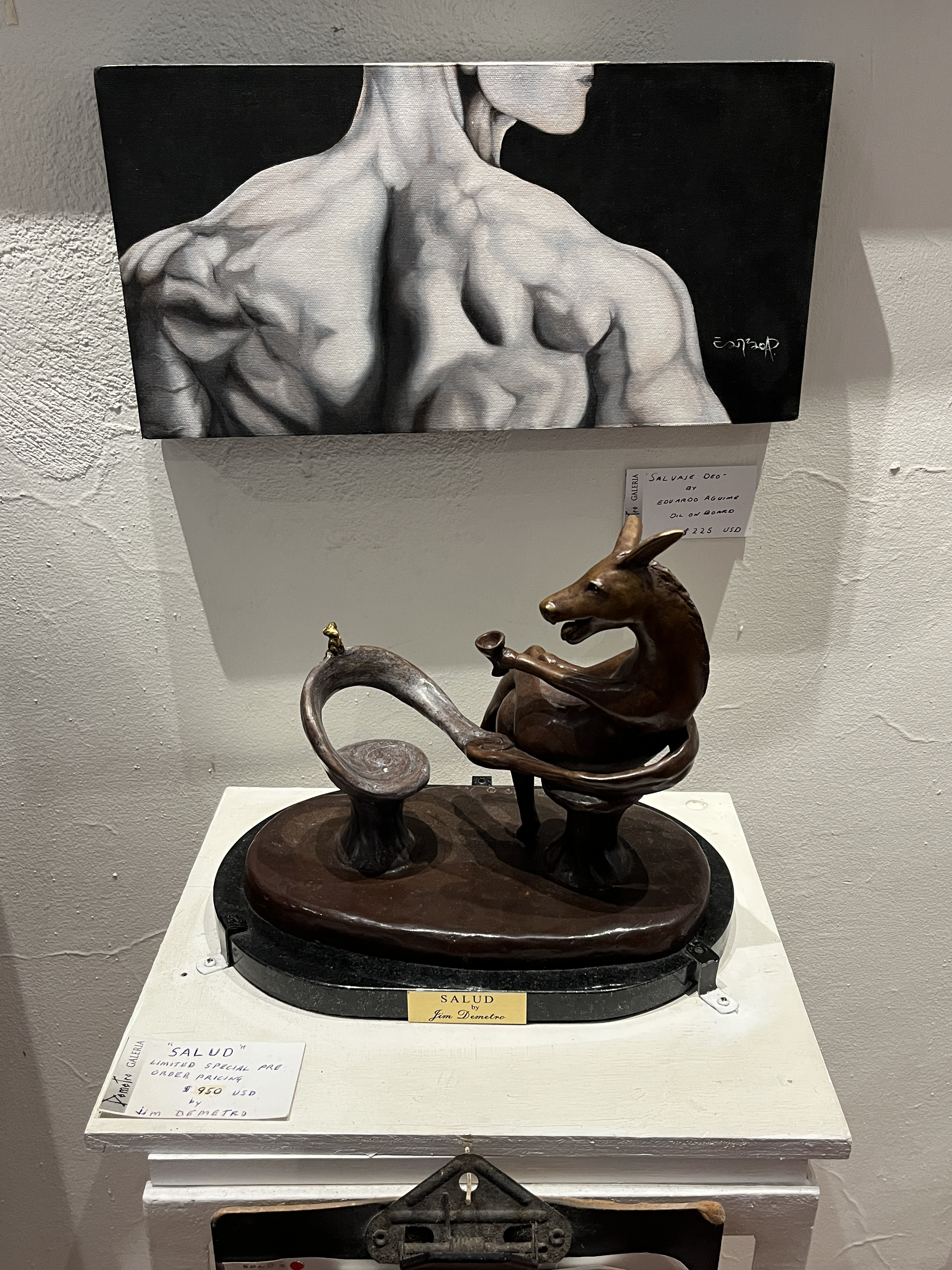

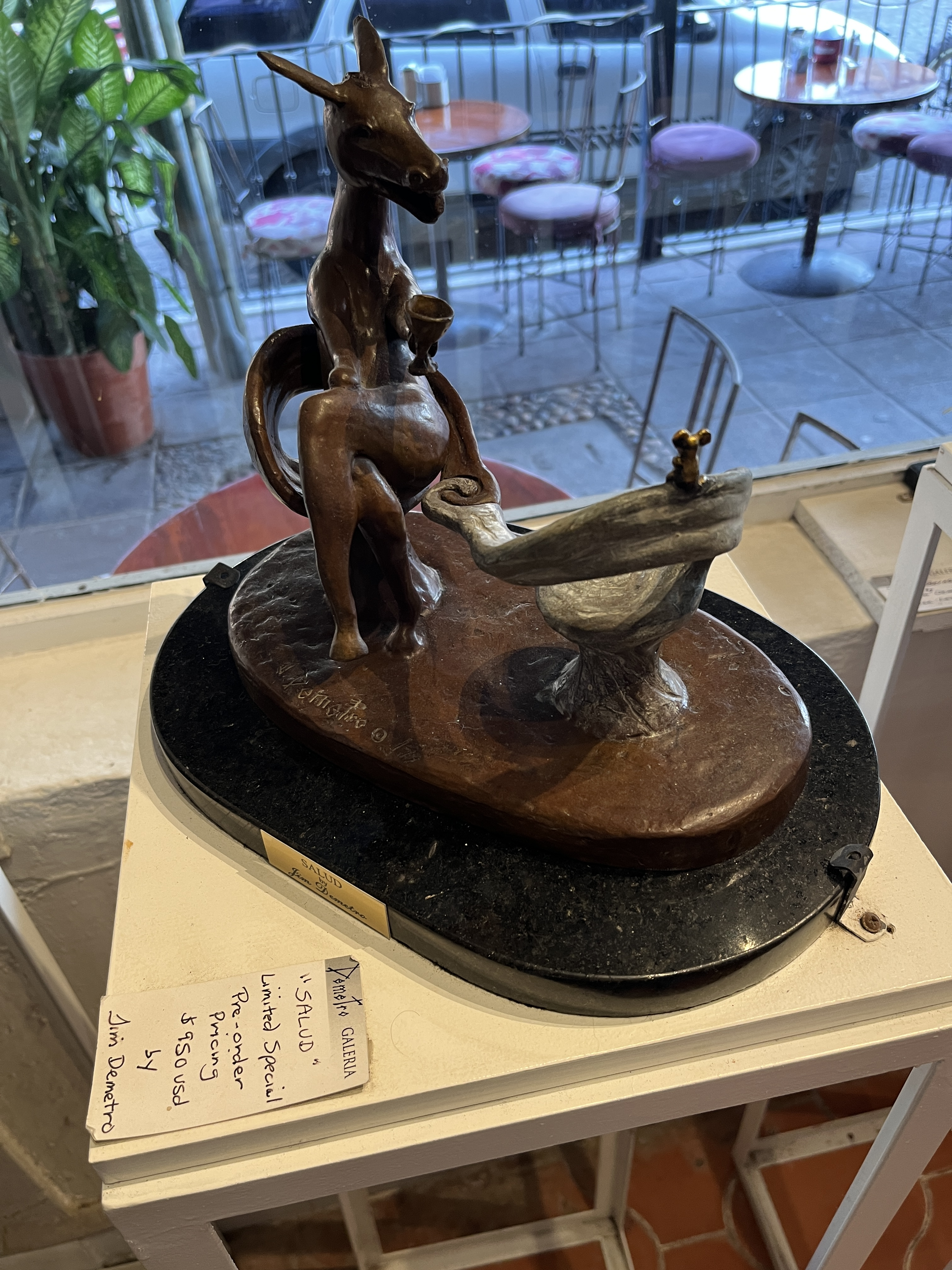

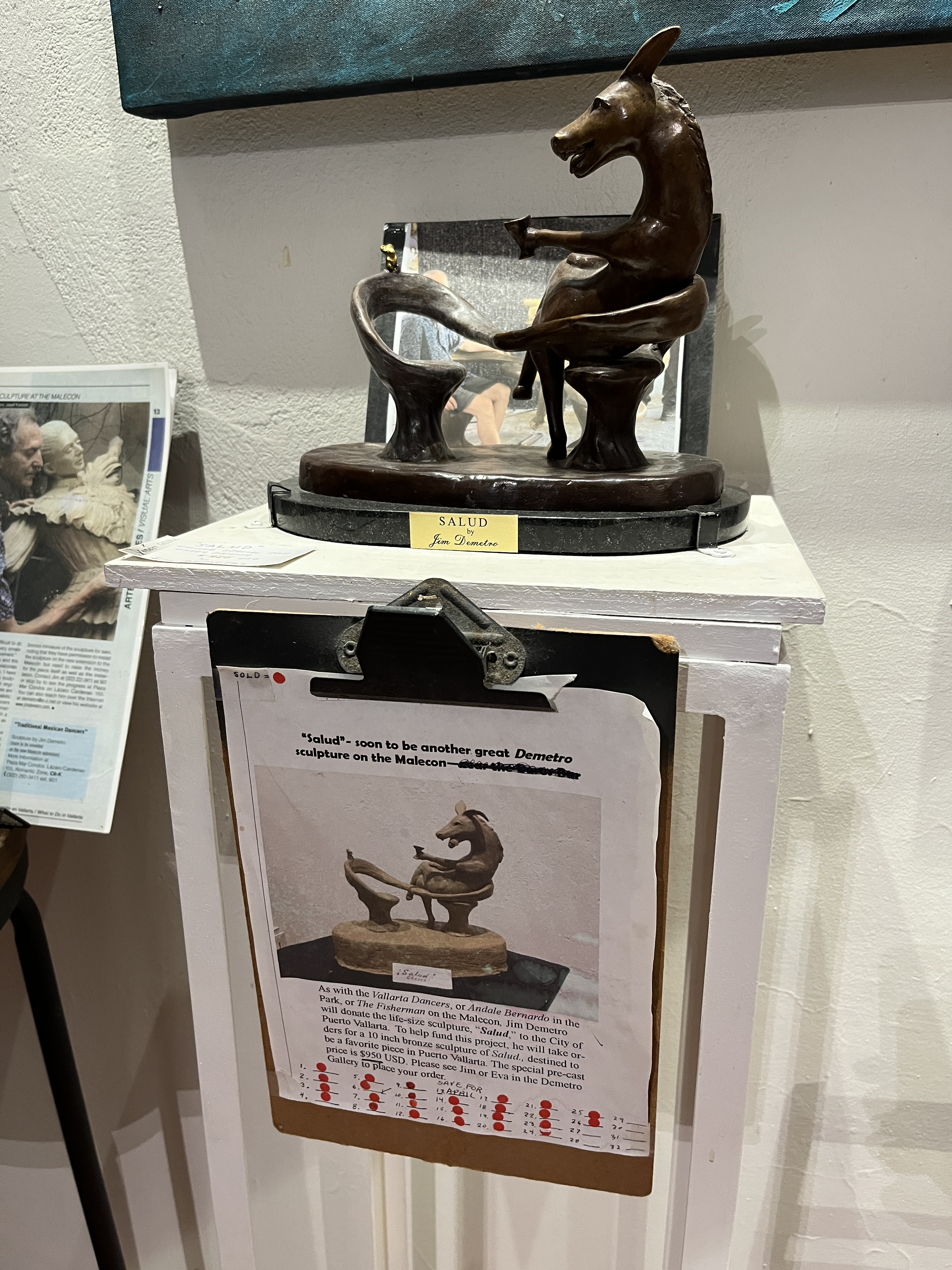
