= Bernie Harris (basketball) =

American basketball player (born 1950)

Personal information
- Born: November 26, 1950 (age 75) Roanoke, Virginia, U.S.
- Listed height: 6 ft 10 in (2.08 m)
- Listed weight: 200 lb (91 kg)

Career information
- High school: Northside (Roanoke, Virginia)
- College: VCU (1970–1974)
- NBA draft: 1974: 4th round, 63rd overall pick
- Drafted by: Buffalo Braves
- Position: Power forward
- Number: 34

Career history
- 1974–1975: Buffalo Braves
- 1975-1977: Scranton Apollos
- 1977-1978: Wilkes-Barre Barons
- 1978: Richmond Virginians
- 1978: Tanduay Esquire
- 1978-1979: Wilkes-Barre Barons
- 1979: Crispa Redmanizers
- 1979-1980: Wilkes-Barre Barons
- 1980-1983: Turun NMKY
- 1983-1986: Espoon Honka
- 1986-1987: Turun NMKY
- 1987-1989: Salon Palloilijat
- 1989-1990: Salon Vilpas
- 1990-1993: Turun NMKY
- 1996-1999: Salon Vilpas
- 2002-2003: Forssa Koripojat

Career highlights
- Finnish championship (1982)
- Stats at NBA.com
- Stats at Basketball Reference

Clarence Bernard Harris (born November 26, 1950, in Roanoke, Virginia) is an American former professional basketball power forward who played one season in the National Basketball Association (NBA) as a member of the Buffalo Braves during the 1974–75 season. He was drafted from Virginia Commonwealth University by the Braves during the fourth round of the 1974 NBA draft by the Braves. Harris played 11 games for the Braves before being waived on January 20, 1975.

Following his release from the NBA, Harris spent five years of bouncing around the CBA and with pro leagues in Switzerland, Germany, and Israel. Harris also played in the Philippines for the Tanduay Esquires in 1978 and the Crispa Redmanizers in 1979.

From 1980 onwards, Harris played in the SM-sarja in Finland, winning the Finnish Championship in 1982. He would play in this league for 15 years and later received Finnish citizenship in 1990. Harris would also coach in this league for 5 years.

Harris currently resides near the capital city of Helsinki with his family. He serves as the president of the "Get In The Game" program, a youth sports initiative sponsored by Finland’s Ministry of Education.

== Career statistics ==
Legend
GP	Games played	GS	Games started	MPG	Minutes per game
FG%	Field goal percentage	3P%	3-point field goal percentage	FT%	Free throw percentage
RPG	Rebounds per game	APG	Assists per game	SPG	Steals per game
BPG	Blocks per game	PPG	Points per game	**Bold**	Career high

=== NBA ===
==== Regular season ====
Year	Team	GP	MPG	FG%	FT%	RPG	APG	SPG	BPG	PPG
1974–75	Buffalo	11	2.3	.182	.500	.7	.1	.0	.1	.5
