= Rudy Salud =

Filipino basketball commissioner

3rd Commissioner of the PBA
- In office January 21, 1988 – January 10, 1992
- Preceded by: Mariano Yenko
- Succeeded by: Rey Marquez

Personal details
- Born: Rodrigo Salud; March 13, 1938 Philippines
- Died: March 7, 2011 (aged 72)
- Party: Nationalist People's Coalition
- Children: including Chito
- Occupation: Sports executive

Rodrigo Salud (March 13, 1938 – March 7, 2011) was the third commissioner of the Philippine Basketball Association from 1988 to 1992 and the founding secretary-general of the World Boxing Council. His son, Chito, was also a former commissioner of the PBA.

== PBA Commissioner ==
He was appointed as the third commissioner of the Philippine Basketball Association after his predecessor, Col. Mariano Yenko retired from his post. Before serving as the commissioner in 1988, he was PBA legal counsel in 1975 and deputy commissioner in 1986.

During his tenure, the league saw growth from six teams in 1986 to eight teams in 1992. He was the author of the league's constitution and by-laws. He also implemented rules to keep the balance of the league, one of which is the protected players list, in which any of the following players cannot be on one team; Ramon Fernandez, Abet Guidaben, Manny Victorino, and Yoyoy Villamin.

It was also during his time that the PBA All-Star Game was institutionalized in 1989.

He resigned from his post in 1992 and became the campaign manager of Danding Cojuangco during the 1992 presidential elections.

== World Boxing Council ==
Salud was the founding secretary-general of the World Boxing Council (WBC) in the 1960s.

| Preceded by Mariano Yenko | PBA Commissioner; 1988–1992 | Succeeded by Reynaldo Marquez |
