= Noli Eala =

Former Chairman of the Philippine Sports Commission

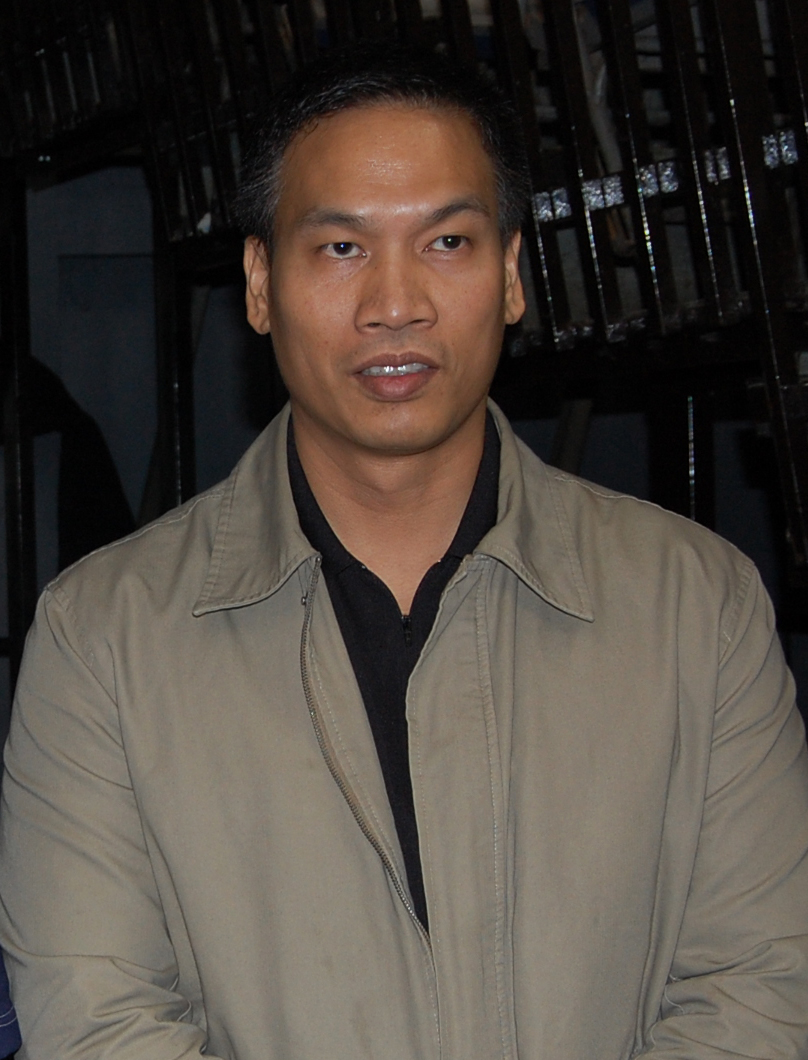
- Eala in 2007

11th Chairperson of the Philippine Sports Commission
- Ad interim
- In office August 30, 2022 – December 28, 2022
- President: Bongbong Marcos
- Preceded by: Guillermo Iroy (officer-in-charge)
- Succeeded by: Dickie Bachmann (ad interim)

6th Commissioner of the Philippine Basketball Association
- In office January 1, 2003 – August 7, 2007
- Preceded by: Jun Bernardino
- Succeeded by: Sonny Barrios

Personal details
- Born: Jose Emmanuel Macasaet Eala Philippines
- Relatives: Alex Eala (niece); Rizza Maniego-Eala (sister-in-law)
- Occupation: Play-by-play commentator, lawyer (disbarred), sports executive

Jose Emmanuel "Noli" Macasaet Eala is a Filipino sports executive and disbarred lawyer who served as the 11th chairperson of the Philippine Sports Commission from August 30 to December 28, 2022. He previously served as the sixth commissioner of the Philippine Basketball Association from 2003 to 2007. Before he became the commissioner of the league, he was a play-by-play commentator of Viva-Vintage Sports, which broadcasts the PBA Games, from the early 1990s until 2002. He was elected as commissioner of the league in 2002 after his predecessor, Emilio "Jun" Bernardino, retired from his post.

== Early life ==
Eala studied high school at La Salle Green Hills before studying at the Ateneo de Manila University, when he obtained his Law degree. He was also a team manager for the Ateneo Blue Eagles. Eala's niece is tennis player Alexandra Eala.

== Play-by-play commentator ==
In his collegiate years, Eala used to call on the Man on the Ball radio show of Romy Kintanar. This later helped land him a job as commentator for PBA games on radio before joining Vintage Sports, later renamed as Viva-Vintage Sports on its TV panel. Eala started as an analyst from 1992 to 1994, then becoming a play-by-play commentator by 1995. Later on, Eala became one of the most popular commentators in the league with his famous lines such as Susmaryosep (a well known Filipino expression) and Nobody does it better, which drew raves and rants from fans.

Eala also became the news anchor of IBC's early evening newscast, IBC Express Balita in 2002 together with Precious Hipolito-Castelo. He later left the newscast to anchor the late-night newscast, IBC News Tonight from 2002 to 2003.

Eala had Andy Jao, Quinito Henson and Tommy Manotoc as color commentators during his years. However, in 2002, he was named as the sixth commissioner of the PBA. It also marked Viva-Vintage's last season as PBA TV coverer. He, alongside Manotoc, called Viva-Vintage's last PBA coverage during Game four of the All-Filipino Finals series between Coca-Cola and Alaska.

Even with his current role as commissioner, Eala had brief appearances on the mic. He was one of the commentators during the 2005 Southeast Asian Games, calling mostly Badminton and Boxing matches. He also called a June 2005 Ateneo-La Salle Reunion Game for Studio 23. He also became one of the commentators for the MVP Cup 2 Badminton tournament. He also served as the play-by-play commentator on FIBA 3x3 and certain Gilas Pilipinas games during the 2018 FIBA World Cup and 2019 Southeast Asian Games.

== PBA commissioner ==
Eala won the commissionership job in 2002 after a series of interviews by the PBA Board of Governors. He beat former Shell head coach and BCAP chair Chito Narvasa and Pilipinas Shell executive Rey Gamboa for the post.

=== Disappointing first season ===
Eala began his stint as commissioner in 2003, replacing Jun Bernardino as commissioner. Eala's first season was frustrating as the league was involved in several controversies. Early in the season, Talk N' Text's Asi Taulava and San Miguel's Dorian Pena were found to have tested positive of taking illegal substances by the Games and Amusements Board. This suspend both players for two games by the league. After this, Eala imposed a new drug testing policy on all PBA players. It led to massive discovery of less than 10 players testing positive, which drew several criticisms from fans and media alike.

Attendance woes also affected the league during the said season. While the All-Filipino Conference had a decent number of attendance, the special Invitational tournament and the import-laiden Reinforced Conference drew disappointing numbers at the gate. One of Eala's plans to revive the league is by holding a tournament with foreign teams matching against PBA squads. This led to the Invitational tournament, in which four foreign squads were invited to join. However, Yonsei University, Novi Sad, Magnolia Jilin Tigers combined to win only a single game in the tournament, that drew another criticism on the league. While the Reinforced Conference had a decent success, the best-of-seven finals series between sister teams Coca Cola and San Miguel had a disappointing attendance during the full seven game series.

=== New format ===
Before the end of the 2003 season, Eala proposed a new format to the PBA Board of Governors. While Eala's plan was to have a one conference season for the league, instead of the usual three conference format, the Board decided to have two conferences in a season. The board also approved Eala's plan to move the league calendar from February to December to October to July, which took effect in 2004. One of the reason's for the move is for the PBA to take an active part in the formation of the national team in future international competitions. As part of the preparation for the new format, the league held a transitional conference known as the Fiesta Conference, which was held from February 22, 2004, until July 7, which was won by crowd-favorite Barangay Ginebra Kings, which drew a crowd of over 10,000 in the four games played at the Araneta Coliseum. The league's format during the said conference is to give the top two teams after the classification phase an outright quarterfinals berth, while the bottom eight will compete in a wildcard phase, with the winners facing off in the round robin quarterfinals format, joining two foreign teams, the University of British Columbia and a US-led squad. However, the format was criticized after the two foreign teams showed up losing all of their games in the quarterfinals. Aside from this, San Miguel, who had 16-2 record, was eliminated from the tournament.

In the 2004-05 Philippine Cup, Eala changed the tournament format, to avoid top teams being eliminated early. The format would give the top two teams an outright semifinals berth, while the three to ten teams will play in a wildcard phase, with the winners advancing in the quarterfinals before facing the two teams in the semifinals.

=== Fil-sham controversy ===
Eala also made noise during the well-publicized Fil-sham (foreigners posing as Filipinos; only Filipinos can play as locals in the PBA, foreigners play as imports) controversy that has hounded the league for years. In 2004, Eala suspended six foreign cagers because of lack of documents to prove their Filipino blood. This also led to a controversial decision by Talk N' Text to suit up Asi Taulava during Game One of the Philippine Cup championship series against Ginebra. Taulava played for the Phone Pals, that resulted in a win. Two days later, however, the commissioner reversed the decision and awarded Ginebra the win.

In 2005, Eala indefinitely suspended several Filipino-Americans, notably Eric Menk, for failing to secure additional documents to the league on time. In June 2005, after Taulava's citizenship was proven, Eala lifted the ban on the 6 ft 9 in center. Later in the year, the commissioner imposed an amnesty act that gave Menk and Mick Pennisi full authority to return and play for their mother teams.

=== Reunion games ===
In 2003, Eala announced a reunion game between Crispa and Toyota as part of the all-Star festivities at the Araneta Coliseum, featuring past players from both the Redmanizers and the Tamaraws. Toyota won the game 65-61, on the late-game heroics of Robert Jaworski. In 2005, the TM Legends Game was held, in which two teams composed of the league's 25 greatest players will play at each other. The team of coach Baby Dalupan won 96-92, with Allan Caidic named as MVP.

Eala, also played a part in forming the Ateneo-La Salle (Ateneo and La Salle are fierce rivals in the UAAP) Dream Games on December 8, 2005, which pit a group of PBA players and current players from both schools to face each others. The main event saw Ateneo defeating La Salle by three points.

=== Marketing ===
Under his watch, the league saw an improvement on its marketing aspects. An example of this are lowering of ticket prices that began in the 2005-06 PBA season, particularly on the Upper Box levels to only five pesos.

This helped the league improved its average attendance from an estimated 4,000 in 2005 to more than 7,000 after the said season.

Promotion was also imposed in the league with the help of several advertisements, TV programs like the league's in-house show iPBA and other gimmicks.

=== Involvement with the national team ===
In late 2004, Eala and the Basketball Association of the Philippines signed a memorandum of agreement for the pro league to send their players in international tournaments such as the FIBA-Asia Champions Cup, the William Jones Cup, the FIBA Asia Championship, and, if possible, the FIBA World Championship and the Olympics. Eala was given authority to choose then-Coca-Cola mentor Chot Reyes as the coach of Team Pilipinas.

However, when the basketball crisis happened in April 2005, Eala sided with the Philippine Olympic Committee, instead of the heavily criticized BAP. Eala also made the constitution for the proposed new basketball body, known as Pilipinas Basketball. As it turned out, the BAP and Pilipinas Basketball were instead ordered by the FIBA to merge into a new body called the Samahang Basketbol ng Pilipinas, of which Eala is a member.

Under his watch, the national team suffered a 9th place showing in the recent 2007 FIBA Asia Championship in Tokushima, Japan, after failing to enter the next round with losses to eventual champion Iran and Jordan.

In several interviews, Eala is urging for the implementation of the FIBA rules in the league in order for the players to easily adjust once they are called for the national squad.

== Disbarment and resignation ==
On August 1, 2007, Eala was disbarred by the Supreme Court of the Philippines in a 9-page per curiam decision due to "grossly immoral conduct" that stemmed from an extramarital affair with a woman named Irene Moje prior to the judicial declaration that her marriage was null and void, which violated Canons 1 and 7 of Rule 1.01 of the Code of Professional Responsibility. On September 20, 2007, the Court dismissed Eala's motion for reconsideration with finality, ruling that, in engaging in an affair, Eala ridiculed marriage as mere "scrap of paper", and violated his lawyer's oath to uphold the Constitution of the Philippines and the laws.

This resulted in the PBA board, during an emergency meeting on August 7, 2007, voting 5-3 to sack Eala as commissioner. On the same day, Eala announced his resignation from his post due to the circumstances of his disbarment case.

The league appointed former PBA executive director Sonny Barrios to act as interim commissioner pending an election. On January 17, 2008, Barrios was named new PBA commissioner by the board (after Chito Salud and Lambert Santos did not get enough votes) until 2009.

== Post PBA commissioner activities ==
On January 21, 2008, New Jersey promoter Gary Shaw confirmed (in Manila) IBF flyweight champion Nonito Donaire's title defense versus Hussein Hussein in Dubai on April 4. Third Force Promotions per president Noli Eala will stage the triple world championship card. The 2 other world title fights include - WBO minimumweight champion Donnie Nietes against No. 1 contender Daniel Reyes of Colombia and IBF lightflyweight titlist Ulises Solís of Mexico against OPBF Juanito Rubillar.

On May 31, 2008, Eala launched Liga Pilipinas, a regional basketball league. It folded in 2011, following the failed merger of the league with the Philippine Basketball League.

He became the Executive Director of Samahang Basketbol ng Pilipinas. Then in the late 2000s he was hired by the San Miguel Corporation to oversee the operations of their three PBA ballclubs: Barangay Ginebra, San Miguel/Petron and Purefoods/B-Meg. In 2013, he was relieved from his post to help out SMC's infrastructure businesses.

He is currently having a radio show named Power and Play, a sports-oriented show telecasts every Saturday mornings on 92.3 Radyo5 True FM (now 105.9 True FM) and One PH.

He also currently serves as the Vice President for Corporate Affairs of JoyRide motorcycle firm.

== PSC chairmanship ==
On August 30, 2022, President Bongbong Marcos appointed Eala to be the 11th chairperson of the Philippine Sports Commission (PSC).

On December 28, 2022, President Marcos appointed former Alaska Aces board governor and team manager Dickie Bachmann to replace Eala as chairperson of the PSC. No reason has been given for the decision.

== Criticisms ==
Eala has been criticized by numerous fans for some of the decisions he made during his three-year run as commissioner. Eala was questioned in 2003 and 2004 for inviting ragtag foreign teams in a PBA sanctioned event. Eala was also questioned for the Fil-sham controversy while some also questioned his role in the POC-BAP crisis. During his days as a commentator, some questioned his way of calling the games on television.

However, some praised Eala for his role in the national teams initiative, the new league format, as well as the two reunion games held in 2003 and 2005. His decision to have the league hold its annual All-Star Games outside Metro Manila, pitting the North and South All-Stars, was well received.

Eala was also in hot water after the Eugene Tejada incident, when the latter suffered a life-threatening incident against Red Bull on May 14, 2006. In a column for the Philippine Daily Inquirer, Beth Celis wrote a piece in which claims that Eala was not in the venue and was "probably tired". After the piece was written, Eala reportedly complained to Celis for her somewhat poor judgment on the commissioner and also aired his side about his absence with Celis and in a separate article written by Quinito Henson. This was confirmed by Celis a later column, which accused Eala of having a "bad side". Eala also did not sanction Red Bull's Mick Pennisi and Enrico Villanueva after Pennisi landed on Tejada, both were accused of planning to injure Tejada, since "there was no malice on the incident."

Eala was also questioned for his proposed "3-point dunk" for the 2006-07 season. This proposal drew criticism from most PBA coaches and basketball purists, who believe that the league should focus on rules applicable to the international game.

The rule was in fact used during the season in the April 2007 PBA All-Star Game in Baguio City.

== See also ==
- Philippine Basketball Association

== Related links ==
- PBA Official Website

Preceded by Emilio Bernardino, Jr.	PBA Commissioner; 2003–2007	Succeeded by Sonny Barrios
