= Chito Salud =

Filipino basketball commissioner

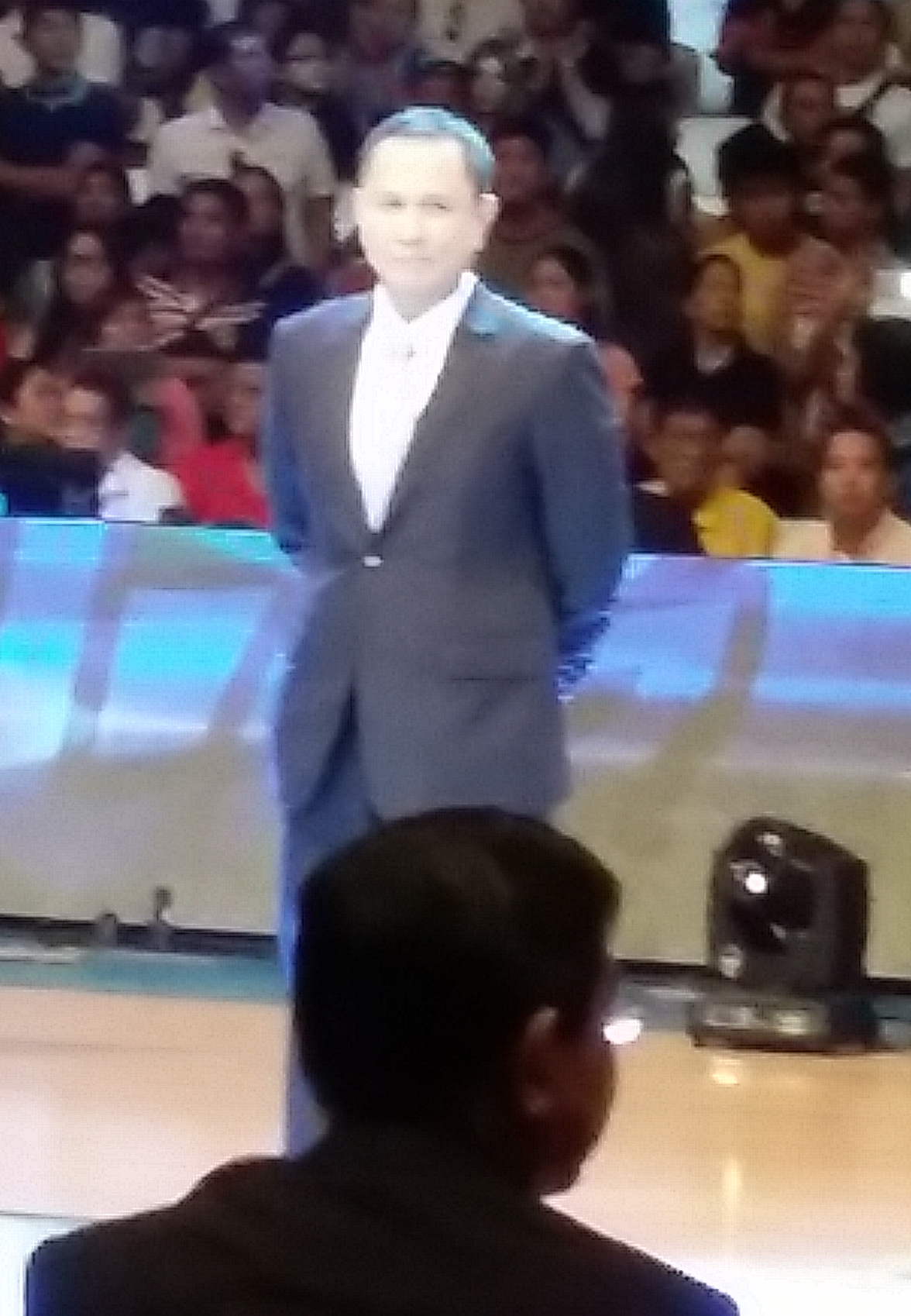
- Salud in 2014

8th Commissioner of the PBA
- In office August 26, 2010 – July 31, 2015
- Preceded by: Sonny Barrios
- Succeeded by: Chito Narvasa

Personal details
- Born: Angelico Tiu Salud; June 17, 1962 (age 64) Philippines
- Parent: Rudy Salud (father)
- Education: Ateneo de Manila University; University of the Philippines College of Law
- Occupation: Lawyer; sports executive

Angelico Tiu Salud (born June 17, 1962), better known as Chito Salud, is a Filipino lawyer and sports executive who currently serves as team governor of the Converge Fiber Xers in PBA. He was the first president and CEO of the Philippine Basketball Association and previously served as its eighth commissioner. He is the son of Rudy Salud, who was the commissioner of the PBA from 1988 to 1992.

== Education ==
Salud is a graduate of a Bachelor of Science degree in Legal Management at the Ateneo de Manila University and a Bachelor of Laws degree from the University of the Philippines College of Law. He is a member of the Upsilon Sigma Phi.

== Career ==
=== Professional ===
Prior to his involvement with the PBA, Salud has had extensive work experience in both government and private sectors:

- Appointed as president of the National Home Mortgage Finance Corporation, a government owned and controlled corporation (GOCC), in September 2000 by former president Joseph Estrada.
- Appointed as President of the Natural Resources Development Corporation, another GOCC.
- Served as legal consultant for the Office of the Mayor in Makati.
- Member of his father's organization called Volunteer Movement for Good Governance.
- Served as independent director of Petron Corporation.

=== PBA ===
In August 2010, it was announced that Salud would succeed Sonny Barrios as PBA commissioner. He officially took over on August 26, 2010. He institutionalized various developments in the league during his five-year term.

On February 15, 2015, Salud announced that he will resign as commissioner of the league by the end of the 2014-2015 season for personal reasons. However, on March 7, 2015, during the 2015 PBA All-Star Weekend in Palawan, PBA chairman Patrick Gregorio announced that the PBA Board of Governors has appointed Salud to be the first president and CEO of the PBA, whose task includes corporate communications, finance, marketing, administrative, human resources and legal relations, which Salud accepted.

On December 1, 2015, Salud announced his resignation as president and CEO of the PBA that took effect at the end of December 2015. On March 23, 2022, Salud made his return to the PBA, as the governor of the Converge PBA team. He resigned as governor of Converge in 2023.

| Preceded by Sonny Barrios | PBA Commissioner; 2010–2015 | Succeeded by Chito Narvasa |
