= Dante Silverio =

Filipino racecar driver and basketball coach

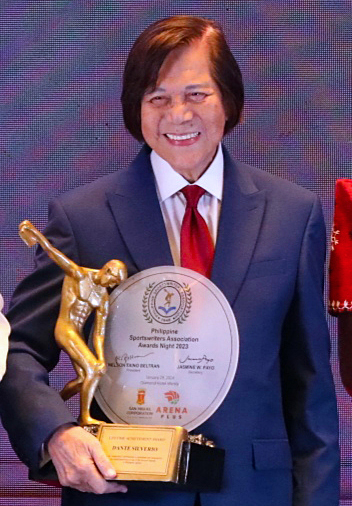
- Silverio in 2024

Personal information
- Born: October 17, 1937 (age 89)
- Coaching career: 1974–1979; 1987–1989

Career history

Coaching
- 1974–1979: Toyota
- 1987–1989: Shell

Career highlights
- As head coach: 5x PBA champion (1975 First Conference, 1975 Second Conference, 1977 Invitational, 1978 All-Filipino, 1978 Invitational); PBA All-Star Game head coach (1989)
Medals
Men's basketball
Team manager for Philippines
ABC Championship
Gold medal – first place	1973 Manila	team

Edmundo "Dante" S. Silverio Sr. (born October 17, 1937), is a Filipino painter, former basketball coach and former champion race car driver.

== Motorsports ==
Silverio rose to prominence in 1972, when he captured a rare double feat, winning the International Greenhills Grand Prix and, two months later, the Royal Rally of Champions.

== Basketball ==
=== Toyota (1973–1979) ===
Silverio became involved in basketball when he formed the Toyota Athletic Club (Komatsu Komets/Toyota Comets) in 1973 which participated in the MICAA. From being its team manager, he became its head coach in 1974 after coach Nilo Verona left the team. In the PBA, he led the franchise to five championships and six runner-up finishes.

In December 1979, Silverio resigned from the team after corporate management decided to reinstate players Ramon Fernandez, Ernesto Estrada and Abe King in Game 2 of the Invitational (3rd) Conference championship finals. Silverio did not field these players in during the conference, claiming the three deliberately “didn't play their best” in a losing finals stint against Royal Tru Orange during the previous conference (1979 Open (2nd) Conference). Toyota eventually won the title on December 15, 1979, under assistant coach Fort Acuña, beating arch-rival Crispa in four games.

=== Formula Shell (1988–1989) ===
He returned to the PBA in 1988-1989 as head coach of Shell. He piloted the franchise to runner-up finishes in the 1988 PBA Reinforced Conference and 1989 PBA Open Conference.

=== PBA All-Star Games (1975, 1989) ===
During the PBA's inaugural season, Silverio coached in the pioneering version of the PBA All-Star Games on December 23, 1975, called the PBA Ovaltine Dream Games. Silverio's Ovaltine Yellow squad lost to the Ovaltine Brown team coached by Baby Dalupan, 126-123 in the third and deciding match.

In 1989, Silverio coached the Rookie-Sophomores-Juniors All-Stars during the 1989 PBA All-Star Weekend, losing to the Veteran All-Stars coached by Baby Dalupan, 132-130.

=== Crispa–Toyota Reunion Game (2003) ===
In 2003, Silverio participated in the Crispa–Toyota reunion game during the 2003 PBA All-Star Weekend, coaching the Toyota team to a 65-61 victory.

=== Philippine Men's Basketball Team (1973) ===
Silverio was the team manager of the Philippines men's national basketball team which captured the 1973 FIBA Asia Championship.

== Hall of Fame ==
- Philippine Basketball Association (April 8, 2007)
- Golden Wheel Awards (February 23, 2009)
- Automobile Association Philippines (AAP) (May 9, 2011)
