= 1987 Great Taste Coffee Makers season =

- Head coach: Baby Dalupan
- General manager: Ignacio Gotao
- Owner: CFC Corporation

Open Conference results
- Record: 15–8 (65.2%)
- Place: 2nd
- Playoff finish: Finals (lost to Tanduay)

All-Filipino Conference results
- Record: 14–5 (73.7%)
- Place: 1st
- Playoff finish: Champions (Def. Hills Bros, 3-0)

Reinforced Conference results
- Record: 6–12 (33.3%)
- Place: 5th
- Playoff finish: Semifinals

Great Taste Coffee Makers seasons

The 1987 Great Taste Coffee Makers season was the 13th season of the franchise in the Philippine Basketball Association (PBA). They were known as Great Taste Instant Milk in the Reinforced Conference.

== Transactions ==
Players added	Signed	Former team
Allan Caidic ^{Rookie}	Off-season	N/A
Fortunato Co, Jr	Off-season	Manila Beer (disbanded)
Ranulfo Robles	Off-season	Manila Beer (disbanded)
Noli Banate	Off-season	Alaska Milk
Reynaldo Ramos	Off-season	Alaska Milk
Arnie Tuadles	Off-season	Alaska Milk
Aldo Perez	Off-season	Formula Shell

=== Trades ===
Off-season	To Shell Manny Victorino, Jaime Manansala	To Great Taste Philip Cezar, Bernie Fabiosa

== Awards ==
- Allan Caidic was named the season's Rookie of the Year.
- Forward Abe King was voted SCOOP Most Outstanding player of the All-Filipino finals series.
- Rookie of the Year winner Allan Caidic, along with teammate Philip Cezar, made it to the Mythical first team selection.

== Championship ==
The Great Taste Coffee Makers regain the All-Filipino Conference crown, scoring a 3-0 sweep over Hills Bros. Coffee Kings for their fifth PBA title as coach Baby Dalupan won his 14th overall championship.

== PBA-IBA series ==
On September 20, the PBA stage a special tournament in partnership with a new league in the United States called International Basketball Association (IBA) for players 6'4" and below. The top three teams in the All-Filipino Conference participated in a four-team field, along with the IBA Selection. PBA teams fielded two imports, and Great Taste paraded Dexter Shouse, on loan to Shell, and Dwight Moody. Great Taste unveiled its new product and renamed its team Great Taste Instant Milk starting with this one-week sideshow. The Milk Masters landed in a one-game championship and lost to the IBA All Stars.

== Notable dates ==
April 2: Great Taste humiliated Ginebra San Miguel, 145-121, for their third straight win after an opening day loss and forged a three-way tie for leadership with Tanduay and Magnolia with similar 3-1 win-loss slates. Import Michael Young led the Coffee Makers with 46 points and got ample support from rookie Allan Caidic's 28 points.

April 7: Great Taste overwhelmed Magnolia Ice Cream, 119-106, leading by as many as 23 points in the final quarter. Michael Young and Allan Caidic's three-point bombs ripped the game apart from a 69-all deadlock in the third period.

April 30: Great Taste pulled off a 152-140 overtime win over Ginebra San Miguel to move into a share of the lead with Tanduay at seven wins and two losses in the Open Conference. Rookie Allan Caidic scored 16 of the Coffee Makers' amazing 26 points in the extension period and finished with 32 points. Michael Young and Ricardo Brown, whose combined last 8 points in regulation forced an overtime, scored 59 and 33 points respectively.

July 21: Great Taste seized solo leadership and remained unbeaten in three starts in the All-Filipino Conference, topping Hills Bros. Coffee Kings, 102-90.

July 30: Allan Caidic scored 27 points and hit a clutch triple as Great Taste held off Tanduay, 116-113, for their fifth win in six games and pushed the Rhum Makers to the brink of elimination in the All-Filipino Conference with their fifth loss with only one win.

October 15: Drawing inspiration from the return of Ricardo Brown, the Great Taste Milk Masters turned back Tanduay Rhum Makers, 143-124, for their first win in the Reinforced Conference after losing their first three games. The Milk Masters withstood the torrid shooting of Tanduay import Freeman Williams in the third quarter, which gave him a total of 72 points.

October 25: Darryl Kennedy scored 43 points to lead Great Taste to a 114-105 win over San Miguel Beer for only their second victory in seven games. Kennedy replaced Jeff Taylor after the Milk Masters posted a 1-4 win-loss card in the first round of eliminations.

== Win-loss records vs opponents ==
Team	Win	Loss	1st (Open)	2nd (All-Filipino)	3rd (Reinforced)
Ginebra	7	4	3-1	2-1	2-2
Hills Bros	6	7	2-0	4-3	0-4
Magnolia / San Miguel	8	4	4-0	3-1	1-3
Shell	6	3	2-0	3-0	1-3
Tanduay	6	7	2-7	2-0	2-0
RP Team	2	0	2-0	N/A	N/A
Total	35	25	15-8	14-5	6-12

== Roster ==
Great Taste Coffee roster
Players
Coaches

Pos.	No.	Nat.	Name	Ht.	Wt.
G	5	(Philippines)	Aaron Torres	5 ft 10 in (1.78 m)		UE
F	6	(Philippines)	Abe King	6 ft 3 in (1.91 m)		San Beda
G/F	8	(Philippines)	Allan Caidic	6 ft 2 in (1.88 m)		UE
G/F	11	(Philippines)	Arnie Tuadles	6 ft 2 in (1.88 m)		Visayas
F	13	(Philippines)	Rey Ramos	6 ft 2 in (1.88 m)		TUA
C	14	(Philippines)	Noli Banate	6 ft 5 in (1.96 m)		Mindanao
G	15	(Philippines)	Bernie Fabiosa	5 ft 9 in (1.75 m)		UE
G	16	(Philippines)	Ranulfo Robles	6 ft 0 in (1.83 m)		Letran
F	18	(Philippines)	Philip Cezar	6 ft 2 in (1.88 m)		José Rizal
G	23	(United States)	Ricardo Brown	5 ft 11 in (1.80 m)		Pepperdine
F	24	(Philippines)	Aldo Perez	6 ft 3 in (1.91 m)		De La Salle
F	29	(Philippines)	Bernardo Carpio	6 ft 3 in (1.91 m)		Ateneo
G	60	(Philippines)	Fortunato Co, Jr	6 ft 0 in (1.83 m)		Mapúa

Head coach

- (Philippines) Baby Dalupan

Assistant coach(es)

- (Philippines) Bong Go

Team manager

- (Philippines) Ignacio Gotao

Legend

- (C) Team captain
- Injured

=== Imports ===
Name	Conference	No.	Pos.	Ht.	College
Michael Young	Open Conference	42	Forward	6"5'	University of Houston
Dexter Shouse ^{Borrowed from Shell}	1987 PBA/IBA World Challenge Cup	10	Guard-forward	6"3'	South Alabama
Dwight Moody	1987 PBA/IBA World Challenge Cup	21	Guard	6"4'	LSU
Jeff Taylor ^{played five games}	Reinforced Conference	44	Guard-forward	6"3'	Texas Tech
Darryl Kennedy ^{replaced Taylor}	Reinforced Conference	30	Guard-forward	6"3'	University of Oklahoma
