= 1987 PBA All-Filipino Conference =

- Duration: July 12 – September 8, 1987
- TV partner(s): Vintage Sports (PTV)

Finals
- Champions: Great Taste Coffee Makers
- Runners-up: Hills Bros. Coffee Kings

PBA All-Filipino Conference chronology
- < 1986 1988 >

PBA conference chronology
- < 1987 Open 1987 PBA/IBA >

The 1987 Philippine Basketball Association (PBA) All-Filipino Conference was the second conference of the 1987 PBA season. It started on July 12 and ended on September 8, 1987. The tournament is an All-Filipino format, which doesn't require an import or a pure-foreign player for each team.

== Format ==
The following format will be observed for the duration of the conference:

- The teams were divided into 2 groups.

Group A:

1. Hills Bros. Coffee Kings
2. Magnolia Ice Cream Makers
3. Tanduay Rhum Makers

Group B:

1. Formula Shell Spark Aiders
2. Ginebra San Miguel
3. Great Taste Coffee Makers

- Teams in a group will play against each other once and against teams in the other group twice; 8 games per team; Teams are then seeded by basis on win–loss records. Ties are broken among point differentials of the tied teams. Standings will be determined in one league table; teams do not qualify by basis of groupings.
- The team with the worst record will be eliminated after the elimination round.
- Semifinals will be two round robin affairs with the remaining five teams.
- The top two teams in the semifinals advance to the best of five Finals. The last two teams dispute the third-place trophy in a best of five playoff and the right to the last slot allocated for the IBA-PBA tournament.

== Elimination round ==
Pos	Team	W	L	PCT	GB	Qualification
1	Hills Bros. Coffee Kings	5	3	.625	—	Semifinal round
2	Great Taste Coffee Makers	5	3	.625	—	Semifinal round
3	Magnolia Ice Cream Makers	4	4	.500	1	Semifinal round
4	Formula Shell Spark Aiders	4	4	.500	1	Semifinal round
5	Ginebra San Miguel	4	4	.500	1	Semifinal round
6	Tanduay Rhum Makers	2	6	.250	3	

== Semifinal round ==
Pos	Team	W	L	PCT	GB	Qualification
1	Hills Bros. Coffee Kings	7	1	.875	—	Advance to the Finals
2	Great Taste Coffee Makers	6	2	.750	1	Advance to the Finals
3	Magnolia Ice Cream Makers	3	5	.375	4	Proceed to third place playoffs
4	Ginebra San Miguel	3	5	.375	4	Proceed to third place playoffs
5	Formula Shell Spark Aiders	1	7	.125	6	

== Third place playoffs ==
Vintage

September 3

Magnolia Ice Cream 102, Ginebra San Miguel 98 (OT)
Scoring by quarter: 29–18, 24–21, 11–22, 28–31, Overtime: 10–6
Pts: Guidaben, Cui & Yturri 15	Pts: Dondon Ampalayo 32

The ULTRA, Pasig

Vintage

September 6

Magnolia Ice Cream 101, Ginebra San Miguel 98 (OT)
Scoring by quarter: 23–18, 20–20, 29–22, 20–32, Overtime: 9–6
Pts: Yves Dignadice 21	Pts: Joey Loyzaga 27

The ULTRA, Pasig

Vintage

September 8

Magnolia Ice Cream 106, Ginebra San Miguel 105
Magnolia wins series, 3–0

The ULTRA, Pasig

== Finals ==
Vintage

September 3

Hills Bros. Coffee Kings 94, Great Taste Coffee Makers 124

The ULTRA, Pasig

Vintage

September 6

Hills Bros. Coffee Kings 110, Great Taste Coffee Makers 114

The ULTRA, Pasig

Vintage

September 8

Hills Bros. Coffee Kings 108, Great Taste Coffee Makers 109
Great Taste wins series, 3–0

The ULTRA, Pasig
