= 1987 PBA All-Filipino Conference finals =

Basketball cup finals

Team	Coach	Wins
Great Taste Coffee Makers	Baby Dalupan	3
Hills Bros. Coffee Kings	Nat Canson	0
- Dates: September 3–8, 1987
- Television: Vintage Sports (PTV)
- Radio network: DZSR

PBA All-Filipino Conference finals chronology
- < 1986 1988 >

The 1987 PBA All-Filipino Conference finals was the best-of-5 basketball championship series of the 1987 PBA All-Filipino Conference, and the conclusion of the conference playoffs. The Great Taste Coffee Makers and Hills Bros. Coffee Kings played for the 37th championship contested by the league.

Great Taste Coffee Makers won their fifth PBA title and third All-Filipino crown, scoring a 3–0 sweep over Hills Bros. Coffee Kings.

== Qualification ==
Great Taste		Hills Bros.
Finished 5–3 (.625), tied for 1st	Eliminations	Finished 5–3 (.625), tied for 1st
Finished 6–2 (.750), 2nd	Semifinals	Finished 7–1 (.875), 1st

== Series scoring summary ==
Team	Game 1	Game 2	Game 3	Wins
Great Taste	124	114	109	3
Hills Bros.	94	110	108	0
Venue	ULTRA	ULTRA	ULTRA

== Games summary ==
=== Game 1 ===
Vintage

September 3

recap

Great Taste Coffee Makers 124, Hills Bros. Coffee Kings 94
Scoring by quarter: 28–25, 26–15, 36–17, 34–37
Pts: Allan Caidic 23	Pts: Bogs Adornado 18

The ULTRA, Pasig

Great taste had their largest lead at 109–70, in a surprising lopsided win.

=== Game 2 ===
Vintage

September 6

Great Taste Coffee Makers 114, Hills Bros. Coffee Kings 110
Scoring by quarter: 32–22, 28–27, 31–31, 23–30
Pts: Ricardo Brown 23	Pts: Alejo Alolor 27

The ULTRA, Pasig

Great Taste leads by as much as 16 points in the final quarter but got a scare from a three-point shooting of Naning Valenciano. The Coffee Makers answered every short-lived uprising in the last two minutes with clutch hits by Ricardo Brown and Allan Caidic.

=== Game 3 ===
Vintage

September 8

recap

Great Taste Coffee Makers 109, Hills Bros. Coffee Kings 108
Scoring by quarter: 22–24, 32–19, 26–32, 29–33
Great Taste wins series, 3–0

The ULTRA, Pasig

Going into the last 12 minutes of the game with Great Taste up by five points, 80–75, a 16–4 run by the Coffee Makers open up a 17-point deficit, 96–79, and looks headed for an easy win and a victory celebration until the Coffee Kings, behind the blazing hands of Bogs Adornado and Ludovico "Naning" Valenciano, suddenly trimmed down the lead to a single margin. The score was 107–99 in favor of Great Taste when Naning Valenciano drained in three consecutive triples in a 9–2 burst as the Coffee Kings came within a point, 108–109, the Coffee Makers didn't call a timeout and Abe King was fouled with four seconds remaining, King muffed his two free throws that gave Hills Bros a chance to reverse the outcome of the game, unfortunately, time ran out as Marte Saldaña failed to score as the buzzer sounded.

1987 PBA All-Filipino Conference Champions

Great Taste Coffee Makers
Fifth title

== Rosters ==
Great Taste Coffee roster
Players
Coaches

Pos.	No.	Nat.	Name	Ht.	Wt.
F	5	(Philippines)	Aaron Torres	6 ft 2 in (1.88 m)		UE
F	6	(Philippines)	Abe King	6 ft 3 in (1.91 m)		San Beda
G/F	8	(Philippines)	Allan Caidic	6 ft 2 in (1.88 m)		UE
G/F	11	(Philippines)	Arnie Tuadles	6 ft 2 in (1.88 m)		Visayas
F	13	(Philippines)	Rey Ramos	6 ft 2 in (1.88 m)		TUA
C	14	(Philippines)	Noli Banate	6 ft 5 in (1.96 m)		Mindanao
G	15	(Philippines)	Bernie Fabiosa	5 ft 9 in (1.75 m)		UE
F	16	(Philippines)	Ranulfo Robles	6 ft 3 in (1.91 m)		Letran
F	18	(Philippines)	Philip Cezar	6 ft 2 in (1.88 m)		José Rizal
G	23	(United States)	Ricardo Brown	5 ft 11 in (1.80 m)		Pepperdine
F	24	(Philippines)	Aldo Perez	6 ft 3 in (1.91 m)		De La Salle
F	29	(Philippines)	Bernardo Carpio	6 ft 3 in (1.91 m)		Ateneo
G	60	(Philippines)	Fortunato Co, Jr	6 ft 0 in (1.83 m)		Mapúa

Head coach

- (Philippines) Baby Dalupan

Assistant coach(es)

- (Philippines) Bong Go

Legend

- (C) Team captain
- Injured

Hills Bros. Coffee roster
Players
Coaches

Pos.	No.	Nat.	Name	Ht.	Wt.
F	2	(Philippines)	Alejo Alolor	6 ft 1 in (1.85 m)		Visayas
G	4	(Philippines)	Frankie Lim	5 ft 11 in (1.80 m)		San Beda
G	7	(Philippines)	Marte Saldaña	5 ft 11 in (1.80 m)		Far Eastern
F	9	(Philippines)	Naning Valenciano	6 ft 1 in (1.85 m)		USLS
C	12	(Philippines)	Teddy Alfarero	6 ft 4 in (1.93 m)		De La Salle
F	13	(Philippines)	Elpidio Villamin	6 ft 3 in (1.91 m)
F	15	(Philippines)	Ricky Relosa	6 ft 3 in (1.91 m)		Mapúa
F	22	(Philippines)	Dennis Abbatuan	6 ft 2 in (1.88 m)		José Rizal
G	26	(Philippines)	Adonis Tierra	5 ft 9 in (1.75 m)		FEATI
G	32	(Philippines)	Tim Coloso	6 ft 2 in (1.88 m)		Letran
F	33	(Philippines)	Bogs Adornado	6 ft 1 in (1.85 m)		UST

Head coach

- (Philippines) Nat Canson

Assistant coach(es)

- (Philippines) Cholo Martin

Legend

- (C) Team captain
- Injured

== Broadcast notes ==
Game	Play-by-play	Analyst
Game 1		
Game 2		
Game 3	Joe Cantada	Andy Jao
