= List of Alaska Aces (PBA) seasons =

The Alaska Aces, owned by Alaska Milk Corporation, joined the Philippine Basketball Association (PBA) in 1986 as an expansion team. The team began play as the Alaska Milkmen in the 1986 PBA season. After the 2021 PBA season, the team was sold to Converge ICT, becoming the Converge FiberXers from 2022 onwards.

== Records per conference ==
Grand Slam champion	Conference champions	Conference runners-up	Conference third-place/semifinalists

=== Three-conference era (1986–2003) ===
Season	Conference	Team name	Elimination round						Playoffs	
Season	Conference	Team name	Finish	GP	W	L	PCT	GB	Stage	Results
1986	Open Conference	Alaska Milkmen	2nd/6	10	6	4	.600	2	Semifinals; 3rd-place playoff	4th overall (9–9), 3–5 on semifinals Ginebra 4, Alaska 2
1986	All-Filipino Cup	Alaska Milkmen	6th/7	6	1	5	.167	4	Quarterfinals	3rd overall (3–6), 2–1 in quarterfinals
1986	Reinforced Conference	Alaska Milkmen	6th/7	12	4	8	.333	5	Quarterfinals	6th overall (5–10), 1–2 in quarterfinals
1987	Open Conference	Hills Bros. Coffee Kings	4th/7	12	4	8	.333	6	Quarterfinals	3rd overall (5–10), 1–2 in quarterfinals
1987	All-Filipino Cup	Hills Bros. Coffee Kings	1st/6	8	5	3	.625	--	Semifinals; Finals	1st overall (7–1); Great Taste 3, Hills Bros. 0
1987	Reinforced Conference	Hills Bros. Coffee Kings	3rd/6	10	6	4	.600	1	Semifinals; Finals berth playoff Finals	2nd overall (10–8), 5–3 in semifinals Hills Bros. 89, Ginebra 87; Magnolia 4, Hills Bros. 1
1988	Open Conference	Alaska Milkmen	4th/6	10	6	4	.600	1	Semifinals; 3rd-place playoff	3rd overall (9–9), 3–5 in semifinals Alaska 3, Ginebra 2
1988	All-Filipino Cup	Alaska Milkmen	3rd/6	12	7	5	.583	1	Semifinals; 3rd-place playoff	4th overall (10–10), 3–5 in semifinals San Miguel 2, Alaska 1
1988	Reinforced Conference	Alaska Milkmen	4th/6	10	5	5	.500	2	Semifinals	5th overall (6–12), 1–7 in semifinals
1989	Open Conference	Alaska Milkmen	5th/6	10	3	7	.300	7	6th-seed playoff Semifinals; 3rd-place playoff	Alaska 133, Añejo Rum 120; 4th overall (7–11), 4–4 in semifinals Alaska 3, Presto 0
1989	All-Filipino Cup	Alaska Milkmen	5th/6	11	5	6	.454	4	Semifinals	5th overall (8–11), 4–4 in semifinals
1989	Reinforced Conference	Alaska Milkmen	5th/6	10	5	5	.500	1	Semifinals; 3rd-place playoff	4th overall (8–10), 3–5 in semifinals Alaska 3, Purefoods 1
1990	First Conference	Alaska Air Force	4th/8	10	6	4	.600	2	Semifinals	5th overall (9–9), 3–5 in semifinals
1990	All-Filipino Cup	Alaska Air Force	4th/8	10	6	4	.600	4	Semifinals	5th overall (6–12), 0–8 in semifinals
1990	Third Conference	Alaska Air Force	1st/8	10	8	2	.800	--	Semifinals; Finals	1st overall (12–6), 4–4 in semifinals Purefoods 3, Alaska 2
1991	First Conference	Alaska Milkmen	7th/8	11	4	7	.364	4	Did not qualify	
1991	All-Filipino Cup	Alaska Milkmen	5th/8	11	6	5	.545	2	Semifinals; 3rd-place playoff	4th overall (10–9), 4–4 in semifinals Alaska 2, San Miguel 1
1991	Third Conference	Alaska Milkmen	2nd/8	11	7	4	.636	2	Semifinals; Finals	1st overall (12–7), 5–3 in semifinals Alaska 3, Añejo 1
1992	First Conference	Alaska Milkmen	4th/8	11	6	5	.545	1	Semifinals; Finals berth playoff	2nd overall (11–8), 5–3 in semifinals San Miguel def. Alaska*
1992	All-Filipino Cup	Alaska Milkmen	7th/8	11	6	5	.545	2	Semifinals; 3rd-place playoff	4th overall (10–9), 4–4 in semifinals Alaska 2, San Miguel 1
1992	Third Conference	Alaska Milkmen	6th/8	13	5	8	.455	4	Elimination playoff	Purefoods 119. Alaska 110*
1993	All-Filipino Cup	Alaska Milkmen	6th/8	10	4	6	.400	4	Did not qualify	
1993	Commissioner's Cup	Alaska Milkmen	5th/8	11	6	5	.545	3	Semifinals	5th overall (10–9), 4–4 in semifinals
1993	Governors Cup	Alaska Milkmen	6th/8	10	4	6	.400	4	Did not qualify	
1994	All-Filipino Cup	Alaska Milkmen	3rd/8	10	6	4	.600	2	Semifinals; 3rd-place playoff	4th overall (10–8), 4–4 in semifinals Alaska def. Swift
1994	Commissioner's Cup	Alaska Milkmen	1st/8	11	9	2	.818	--	Semifinals; Finals	1st overall (14–5), 5–3 in semifinals Coney Island 4, Alaska 1
1994	Governors Cup	Alaska Milkmen	2nd/8	10	6	4	.600	1	Semifinals; Finals	7–3 in semifinals Alaska 4, Swift 2
1995	All-Filipino Cup	Alaska Milkmen	3rd/8	10	5	5	.500	2	Semifinals; Finals berth playoff Finals	2nd overall (10–8), 5–3 in semifinals Alaska 111, Purefoods 89; Sunkist 4, Alaska 3
1995	Commissioner's Cup	Alaska Milkmen	3rd/8	10	7	3	.700	2	Quarterfinals; Semifinals; Finals	3rd overall (10–5), 3–2 in quarterfinals Alaska 3, Sta. Lucia Realtors 0 Sunkist 4, Alaska 2
1995	Governors Cup	Alaska Milkmen	3rd/8	10	7	3	.700	1	Semifinals; Finals	1st overall (13–5), 6–2 in semifinals Alaska 4, San Miguel 3
1996	All-Filipino Cup	Alaska Milkmen	1st/8	14	10	4	.714	--	Semifinals; Finals berth playoff Finals	2nd overall (13–9), 3–5 in semifinals Alaska 96, Ginebra 83*; Alaska 4, Purefoods 1
1996	Commissioner's Cup	Alaska Milkmen	1st/8	10	8	2	.800	--	Semifinals; Finals	1st overall (14–4), 6–2 in semifinals Alaska 4, Shell 3
1996	Governors Cup	Alaska Milkmen	2nd/8	14	9	5	.643	--	Semifinals; Finals	Alaska 3, Sta. Lucia 0 Alaska 4, Purefoods 1
1997	All-Filipino Cup	Alaska Milkmen	6th/8	14	6	8	.429	4	Did not qualify	
1997	Commissioner's Cup	Alaska Milkmen	5th/8	10	5	5	.500	1	Semifinals; Finals	1st overall (11–7), 6–2 in semifinals Gordon's 4, Alaska 2
1997	Governors Cup	Alaska Milkmen	3rd/8	10	7	3	.700	1	Semifinals; Finals	1st overall (13–5), 6–2 in semifinals Alaska 4, Purefoods 1
1998	All-Filipino Cup	Alaska Milkmen	1st/8	11	9	2	.818	--	Semifinals; Finals berth playoff Finals	2nd overall (14–7), 5–5 in semifinals Alaska 77, Sta. Lucia 69*; Alaska 4, San Miguel 3
1998	Commissioner's Cup	Alaska Milkmen	3rd/8	11	10	1	.909	--	Semifinals; Finals	Alaska 3, Shell 2 Alaska 4, San Miguel 2
1998	Centennial Cup	Alaska Milkmen	7th/9	8	3	5	.375	3	Did not qualify	
1998	Governors Cup	Alaska Milkmen	8th/8	(7); 15	(2); 5	(5); 10	(.286).333	4	(Records carried over from Centennial Cup); Did not qualify	
1999	All-Filipino Cup	Alaska Milkmen	3rd/9	16	9	7	.563	2	Quarterfinals; Semifinals; 3rd-place playoff	Alaska** def. Purefoods in 2 games Tanduay 3, Alaska 1 Barangay Ginebra 95, Alaska 73*
1999	Commissioner's Cup	Alaska Milkmen	1st/9	8	6	2	.750	--	Quarterfinals; Semifinals; 3rd-place playoff	Alaska** def. Mobiline in 1 game San Miguel 3, Alaska 2 Alaska def. Sta. Lucia*
1999	Governors Cup	Alaska Milkmen	4th/9	8	5	3	.625	2	Quarterfinals; Semifinals; Finals	Alaska 77, Shell 65*; Alaska 3, B-Meg 0 San Miguel 4, Alaska 2
2000	All-Filipino Cup	Alaska Milkmen	3rd/10	14	10	4	.714	2	Quarterfinals; Semifinals; Finals	Alaska** def. Sta. Lucia in 1 game Alaska 3, San Miguel 1 Alaska 4, Purefoods 1
2000	Commissioner's Cup	Alaska Milkmen	4th/10	9	5	4	.556	2	Quarterfinals; Semifinals; 3rd-place playoff	Alaska def. Purefoods; San Miguel 3, Alaska 0 Alaska def. Tanduay*
2000	Governors Cup	Alaska Milkmen	5th/10	9	5	4	.556	2	Quarterfinals	Purefoods** def. Alaska in 2 games
2001	All-Filipino Cup	Alaska Aces	5th/10	14	7	7	.500	2	Quarterfinals	Pop Cola def. Alaska in 2 games
2001	Commissioner's Cup	Alaska Aces	4th/10	9	5	4	.556	2	Quarterfinals; Semifinals; 3rd-place playoff	Alaska 78, Sta. Lucia 68*; San Miguel 3, Alaska 2 Alaska def. Purefoods*
2001	Governors Cup	Alaska Aces	6th/9	13	6	7	.462	2	Quarterfinals	Pop Cola 88, Alaska 78*
2002	Governors Cup	Alaska Aces	4th/12	11	6	5	.545	3	Quarterfinals; Semifinals; Finals	Alaska 74, FedEx 71*; Alaska 3, San Miguel 2 Purefoods 4, Alaska 3
2002	Commissioner's Cup	Alaska Aces	3rd/11	10	6	4	.600	1	Quarterfinals; Semifinals; 3rd-place playoff	Alaska** def. FedEx in 2 games Talk 'N Text 3, Alaska 2 San Miguel def. Alaska*
2002	All-Filipino Cup	Alaska Aces	5th/10	9	5	4	.556	3	Quarterfinals; Semifinals; Finals	Alaska 82, Talk 'N Text 63; Alaska 2, Red Bull 1 Coca-Cola 3, Alaska 1
2003	All-Filipino Cup	Alaska Aces	3rd/5	18	9	9	.500	3	Quarterfinals; Semifinals; 3rd-place playoff	1st in Group A (2–1); Talk 'N Text 3, Alaska 0 Alaska 102, Sta. Lucia 79*
2003	Invitational Cup	Alaska Aces	1st/5	4	4	0	1.000	--	Mabuhay Cup Semifinals; Finals	4–0 in qualifying Alaska 95, Red Bull 87*; Alaska 3, Coca-Cola 1
2003	Reinforced Conference	Alaska Aces	4th/5	13	4	9	.308	4	Elimination playoff Quarterfinals	Alaska 93, Purefoods 88; Sta. Lucia 2, Alaska 1
Elimination round				589	330	259	.560	—	41 semifinal appearances	
Playoffs				458	248	210	.541	—	19 Finals appearances	
Cumulative totals				1047	578	469	.552	—	11 championships	

=== Two-conference era (2004–2010) ===
Season	Conference	Team name	Elimination/classification round						Playoffs	
Season	Conference	Team name	Finish	GP	W	L	PCT	GB	Stage	Results
(2004)	Fiesta Conference	Alaska Aces	2nd	18	12	6	.667	4	Quarterfinals	3rd in Group B (1–2)
2004-05	Philippine Cup	Alaska Aces	4th	18	9	9	.500	4	4th-seed playoff Wildcard phase Quarterfinals	Alaska 98, San Miguel 91*; Alaska** 96, FedEx 93; San Miguel 2, Alaska 0
2004-05	Fiesta Conference	Alaska Aces	3rd	18	11	7	.611	1	2nd-seed playoff Wildcard phase Quarterfinals	San Miguel 73, Alaska 71*; Alaska** 86, Coca-Cola 66; Red Bull 2, Alaska 1
2005-06	Fiesta Conference	Alaska Aces	7th	16	7	9	.438	3	Wildcard phase Quarterfinals	Alaska 2, Sta. Lucia 1 Red Bull 3, Alaska 0
2005-06	Philippine Cup	Alaska Aces	4th	16	9	7	.563	3	Quarterfinals; Semifinals; 3rd-place playoff	Alaska 3, Coca-Cola 1 Purefoods 4, Alaska 3 Alaska 102, San Miguel 95*
2006-07	Philippine Cup	Alaska Aces	7th	18	8	10	.444	5	Wildcard phase	3rd overall (9–12), 3rd in wildcards (1–2)
2006-07	Fiesta Conference	Alaska Aces	2nd	18	12	6	.667	1	2nd-seed playoff Semifinals; Finals	Alaska 103, Barangay Ginebra 95*; Alaska 4, San Miguel 2 Alaska 4, Talk 'N Text 3
2007-08	Philippine Cup	Alaska Aces	3rd	18	11	7	.611	1	Quarterfinals; Semifinals; 3rd-place playoff	Alaska 2, Coca-Cola 0 Sta. Lucia 4, Alaska 3 Red Bull 125, Alaska 104*
2007-08	Fiesta Conference	Alaska Aces	6th	18	9	9	.500	3	1st wildcard round	Sta. Lucia 99, Alaska 86*
2008-09	Philippine Cup	Alaska Aces	1st	18	12	6	.667	--	Semifinals; Finals	Alaska 4, Sta. Lucia 2 Talk 'N Text 4, Alaska 3
2008-09	Fiesta Conference	Alaska Aces	9th	14	6	8	.429	5	8th-seed playoff Wildcard phase	Coca-Cola 81, Alaska 74; Burger King** 96, Alaska 90
2009-10 (details)	Philippine Cup	Alaska Aces	1st/10	18	13	5	.722	--	Semifinals; Finals	Alaska 4, Barangay Ginebra 0 Purefoods 4, Alaska 0
2009-10 (details)	Fiesta Conference	Alaska Aces	4th/10	18	11	7	.611	4	Quarterfinals; Semifinals; Finals	Alaska 3, Barangay Ginebra 2 Alaska 4, Talk 'N Text 3 Alaska 4, San Miguel 2
Elimination/classification round				226	130	96	.575	—	10 post-wildcard appearances	
Playoffs				99	51	48	.515	—	3 Finals appearances	
Cumulative totals				325	181	144	.557	—	2 championship	

*one-game playoffs
**team had twice-to-beat advantage

=== Three-conference era (2010–2022) ===
Season	Conference	Team name	Elimination round						Playoffs	
Season	Conference	Team name	Finish	GP	W	L	PCT	GB	Stage	Results
2010-11	Philippine	Alaska Aces	6th/10	14	7	7	.500	4	Quarterfinals	Barangay Ginebra 2, Alaska 1
2010-11	Commissioner's	Alaska Aces	5th/10	9	5	4	.556	3	Quarterfinals	Air21 2, Alaska 1
2010-11	Governors'	Alaska Aces	3rd/9	8	5	3	.625	1	Semifinals	3rd overall (8–5), 3–2 in semifinals
2011-12	Philippine	Alaska Aces	9th/10	14	3	11	.214	7	Did not qualify	
2011-12	Commissioner's	Alaska Aces	4th/10	9	5	4	.556	2	Quarterfinals	Barako Bull 2, Alaska 1
2011-12	Governors'	Alaska Aces	9th/10	9	2	7	.222	6	Did not qualify	
2012-13	Philippine	Alaska Aces	5th/10	14	8	6	.571	4	Quarterfinals; Semifinals	Alaska 2, Meralco 0 Talk 'N Text 4, Alaska 2
2012-13	Commissioner's	Alaska Aces	1st/10	14	11	3	.786	--	Quarterfinals; Semifinals; Finals	Alaska** 87, Air21 81; Alaska 3, San Mig Coffee, 1 Alaska 3, Barangay Ginebra 0
2012-13	Governors'	Alaska Aces	3rd/10	9	4	5	.444	4	Quarterfinals	San Mig Coffee** def. Alaska in 2 games
2013-14	Philippine	Alaska Aces	8th/10	14	5	9	.357	6	8th-seed playoff Quarterfinals	Alaska 94, Meralco 91*; Barangay Ginebra** def. Alaska in 2 games
2013-14	Commissioner's	Alaska Aces	3rd/10	9	6	3	.667	3	Quarterfinals	San Mig Coffee 2, Alaska 1
2013-14	Governors'	Alaska Aces	3rd/10	9	5	4	.556	2	Quarterfinals; Semifinals	Alaska** 92, Barangay Ginebra 81; Rain or Shine 3, Alaska 2
2014-15	Philippine	Alaska Aces	3rd/12	11	8	3	.727	1	Quarterfinals; Semifinals; Finals	1st phase: Alaska** 82, NLEX 78; 2nd phase: Alaska 87, Meralco 69*; Alaska 4, Rain or Shine 2 San Miguel 4, Alaska 3
2014-15	Commissioner's	Alaska Aces	6th/12	11	5	6	.455	3	Quarterfinals	Purefoods 2, Alaska 0
2014-15	Governors'	Alaska Aces	1st/12	11	8	3	.727	--	Quarterfinals; Semifinals; Finals	Alaska** 114, Barangay Ginebra 108; Alaska 3, Star 0 San Miguel 4, Alaska 0
2015-16	Philippine	Alaska Aces	1st/12	11	9	2	.818	--	Semifinals; Finals	Alaska 4, GlobalPort 1 San Miguel 4, Alaska 3
2015-16	Commissioner's	Alaska Aces	3rd/12	11	7	4	.636	1	Quarterfinals; Semifinals; Finals	Alaska 2, TNT 1 Alaska 3, Meralco 2 Rain or Shine 4, Alaska 2
2015-16	Governors'	Alaska Aces	6th/12	11	6	5	.545	4	Quarterfinals	Barangay Ginebra** 109, Alaska 104
2016-17	Philippine	Alaska Aces	2nd/12	11	7	4	.636	3	Quarterfinals	Barangay Ginebra def. Alaska** in 2 games
2016-17	Commissioner's	Alaska Aces	8th/12	11	4	7	.364	5	8th-seed playoffs	GlobalPort 107, Alaska 106*
2016-17	Governors'	Alaska Aces	9th/12	11	3	8	.273	6	Did not qualify	
2017-18	Philippine	Alaska Aces	3rd/12	11	7	4	.636	1	Quarterfinals	NLEX 2, Alaska 0
2017-18	Commissioner's	Alaska Aces	2nd/12	11	8	3	.727	1	Quarterfinals; Semifinals	Alaska** 89, Magnolia 78; San Miguel 3, Alaska 1
2017-18	Governors'	Alaska Aces	3rd/12	11	8	3	.727	1	Quarterfinals; Semifinals; Finals	Alaska** 96, San Miguel 85; Alaska 3, Meralco 1 Magnolia 4, Alaska 2
2019	Philippine	Alaska Aces	9th/12	11	4	7	.364	5	8th-seed playoffs Quarterfinals	Alaska 88, NLEX 80*; Phoenix Pulse** 91, Alaska 76
2019	Commissioner's	Alaska Aces	8th/12	11	4	7	.364	6	8th-seed playoffs Quarterfinals	Alaska 108, Meralco 103*; TNT** def. Alaska in 2 games
2019	Governors'	Alaska Aces	7th/12	11	5	6	.455	3	Quarterfinals	Meralco** 94, Alaska 84
2020	Philippine	Alaska Aces	6th/12	11	7	4	.636	1	Quarterfinals	TNT** 104, Alaska 83
2021	Philippine	Alaska Aces	11th/12	11	3	8	.278	7	Did not qualify	
2021	Governors'	Alaska Aces	7th/12	11	6	5	.545	3	Quarterfinals	NLEX** def. Alaska in 2 games
Elimination round				330	175	155	.539	—	10 semifinal appearances	
Playoffs				126	63	63	.500	—	6 Finals appearances	
Cumulative records				456	238	218	.522	—	1 championship	

* One-game Playoffs
** Team had the Twice-to-Beat Advantage

== Cumulative records ==
Era	GP	W	L	PCT
Three-conference era (1986–2003)	1,047	578	469	.552
Two-conference era (2004–2010)	325	181	144	.557
Three-conference era (2010–2022)	456	238	218	.522
Total	1,828	997	831	.545
