= 1987 Hills Bros. Coffee Kings season =

- Head coach: Nat Canson; Arturo Valenzona (3rd Conference)
- General manager: Joel Aquino
- Owner: Holland Milk Products, Inc.

Open Conference results
- Record: 5–10 (33.3%)
- Place: 5th
- Playoff finish: Quarterfinals

All-Filipino Conference results
- Record: 12–7 (63.2%)
- Place: 2nd
- Playoff finish: Finals (lost to Great Taste)

Reinforced Conference results
- Record: 12–12 (50%)
- Place: 2nd
- Playoff finish: Finals (lost to SMB)

Hills Bros. Coffee Kings seasons

The 1987 Hills Bros. Coffee Kings season was the 2nd season of the franchise in the Philippine Basketball Association (PBA).

== Transactions ==
Players Added	Signed	Former team
William Adornado ^{Acquired when they traded Rey Cuenco and rookie pick Al Solis}	Off-season	Formula Shell
Joey Marquez	Off-season	Ginebra
Tim Coloso	Off-season	Manila Beer (disbanded)
Adonis Tierra	Off-season	Manila Beer (disbanded)
Elpidio Villamin	Off-season	Manila Beer (disbanded)

== Awards ==
Elpidio "Yoyoy" Villamin was awarded Most Outstanding Pro Player of the year for the 1987 season by the Sports and Columnist Organization of the Philippines (SCOOP). Villamin was also named Most Improved Player for the season by the PBA and he made it to the Mythical five selection, placing second to Alberto Guidaben for the Most Valuable Player (MVP) plum.

== Notable dates ==
March 31: Import Francois Wise scored 46 points as Hills Bros carved out a come-from-behind 102–98 win over Formula Shell. Both teams were winless in two games before their match. Wise came back with his fourth team in five years, replacing Tony Neal.

July 12: Bogs Adornado scored on a jumper and a foul from Leo Austria with two seconds left as the Coffee Kings eked out a 104–101 win over Formula Shell at the start of the All-Filipino Conference. The Spark Aiders battled back from a 94–101 deficit to level the count at 101-all with 20 seconds remaining on a rare four-point play and a three-pointer from Leo Austria.

August 9: Yoyoy Villamin produced his first triple-double performance of 20 points, 16 rebounds and 11 assists to power Hills Bros to a 107–103 victory over Great Taste at the start of the semifinal round in the All-Filipino Conference.

October 13: After two losses, Hills Bros scored their first win in the Reinforced Conference, routing San Miguel Beermen, 129–94. Import Jose Slaughter scored 52 points for the Coffee Kings. The Beermen absorbed its first setback in four games.

October 18: Jose Slaughter scored 79 points and a record-breaking 14 triples in Hills Bros' 129–115 win over Great Taste Instant Milk. Slaughter's feat surpasses the 13 three-pointers previously made by Rob Williams of Tanduay Rhum last season.

December 1: Jose Slaughter sank in the follow-up shot with two seconds left that carried Hills Bros to an 89–87 victory over Ginebra San Miguel in their knockout game and sent the Coffee Kings into the championship playoffs against San Miguel Beermen.

== Occurrences ==
Former Tanduay coach Arturo Valenzona takes over from Nat Canson, who resigned as the Coffee Kings head coach after the PBA/IBA series, Canson led Hills Bros to a runner-up finish in the All-Filipino Conference.

== Finals stint ==
The Coffee Kings had two bridesmaid finishes for the season, losing to Great Taste Coffee in the All-Filipino Conference and San Miguel Beermen in the Reinforced Conference.

== Won–loss records vs opponents ==
Team	Win	Loss	1st (Open)	2nd (All-Filipino)	3rd (Reinforced)
Ginebra	6	6	0-3	3-1	3–2
Great Taste	7	6	0-2	3-4	4–0
Magnolia / San Miguel	4	10	0-2	2-1	2–7
Shell	8	3	3-0	3-1	2-2
Tanduay	2	4	0-3	1-0	1-1
RP Team	2	0	2-0	N/A	N/A
Total	29	29	5-10	12-7	12-12

== Roster ==
1987 Hills Bros. Coffee Kings roster
Players

Pos.	#	POB	Name	Height	Weight	DOB (YYYY–MM–DD)	From
F	2	(Philippines)	Alejo Alolor	6 ft 1 in (1.85 m)			Visayas
G	4	(Philippines)	Frankie Lim	5 ft 11 in (1.80 m)			San Beda
G	6	(Philippines)	Joey Marquez	6 ft 1 in (1.85 m)			Angeles
G	7	(Philippines)	Marte Saldaña	5 ft 11 in (1.80 m)			Far Eastern
F	9	(Philippines)	Ludovico Valenciano	6 ft 1 in (1.85 m)			USLS
C	12	(Philippines)	Teodicio Alfarero	6 ft 4 in (1.93 m)			De La Salle
F	13	(Philippines)	Elpidio Villamin	6 ft 3 in (1.91 m)
F	15	(Philippines)	Ricardo Relosa	6 ft 3 in (1.91 m)			Mapúa
F	22	(Philippines)	Dennis Abbatuan	6 ft 2 in (1.88 m)			José Rizal
G	26	(Philippines)	Adonis Tierra	5 ft 9 in (1.75 m)			FEATI
G	32	(Philippines)	Timoteo Coloso	6 ft 2 in (1.88 m)			Letran
F	33	(Philippines)	Bogs Adornado	6 ft 1 in (1.85 m)			UST

Coaches

Head coach

- (Philippines) Arturo Valenzona

Assistant coach(es)

- (Philippines) Cholo Martin

Team manager

- (Philippines) Joel Aquino

Legend

- (C) Team captain
- Injured

=== Imports ===
Name	Conference	No.	Pos.	Ht.	College
Tony Neal ^{played two games}	Open Conference	44	Forward-Center	6"6'	Cal State Fullerton
Francois Wise ^{Replaces Neal}	Open Conference	5	Forward-Center	6"5'	Long Beach State
Alexander Adams	1987 PBA/IBA World Challenge Cup	42	Forward	6"4'	
McKinley Singleton	1987 PBA/IBA World Challenge Cup	44	Guard	6"3'	UAB
Jose Slaughter	Reinforced Conference	21	Guard-Forward	6"3'	University of Portland
