= 1987 Shell Azocord Super Bugbusters season =

- Head coach: Edgardo Ocampo; Joe Lipa
- Owners: Pilipinas Shell, Inc.

Open Conference results
- Record: 4–12 (25%)
- Place: 6th
- Playoff finish: Quarterfinals

All-Filipino Conference results
- Record: 5–11 (31.3%)
- Place: 5th
- Playoff finish: Semifinals

Reinforced Conference results
- Record: 9–13 (40.9%)
- Place: 4th
- Playoff finish: Semifinals

Shell Azocord Super Bugbusters seasons

The 1987 Shell Azocord Super Bugbusters season was the 3rd season of the franchise in the Philippine Basketball Association (PBA). Known as Formula Shell Spark Aiders in the Open and All-Filipino Conference.

== Transactions ==
Players Added	Signed	Former team
Leopoldo Herrera	Off-season	Great Taste
Willie Pearson	Off-season	Great Taste

=== Trades ===
Off-season	To Great Taste Philip Cezar, Bernie Fabiosa	To Shell Manny Victorino, Jaime Manansala
Off-season	To Hills Bros Bogs Adornado	To Shell Rey Cuenco, Al Solis

== Occurrences ==
Head coach Edgardo Ocampo was replaced by national team coach Joe Lipa starting the Third Conference after two dismal conferences by the team.

Import Dexter Shouse suddenly left after leading Shell to six wins and two losses in the Third Conference, taking his place is another former Shell import Dwight Anderson.

== Notable dates ==
April 26: Formula Shell finally found a redeemer in import Calvin Thompson and struck a first-ever triumph in the Open Conference at the expense of Ginebra San Miguel, 107-104. The debuting Thompson dumped in 19 of his 44 points in the final quarter. The Spark Aiders were winless in six starts where imports Dwayne Randall and Michael Clarke played three games each and failed to lead the team to a victory.

October 4: With new coach Joe Lipa, Shell Azocord blew out defending champion Tanduay Rhum, 121-78, at the start of the Reinforced Conference. The Super Bugbusters wrapped up the contest as early in the third period and had their largest lead of 45 points four times.

October 11: Shell Azocord remains unbeaten with their third straight victory, a 109-101 win over Ginebra San Miguel.

October 17: The Super Bugbusters keeps its clean slate with five wins and sweeps the first round of eliminations by turning back San Miguel Beermen, 112-104, in an out-of-town game at the San Agustin gym in Iloilo City.

November 5: Dwight Anderson, returning as Shell's import after Dexter Shouse left, powered the Super Bugbusters to a 114-110 win over San Miguel Beermen and put Shell on top of the standings after the eliminations with a 7-3 won-loss slate.

November 12: On the eve of coach Joe Lipa's departure in Thailand to join the Philippine men's national team in defending the Cage Crown in the Southeast Asian Games, Shell nips Hills Bros, 108-106, and improved their semifinal slate to eight wins and five losses. Assistant coach Freddie Gonzales takes over for a while at the Shell bench.

== Won-loss records vs Opponents ==
Team	Win	Loss	1st (Open)	2nd (All-Filipino)	3rd (Reinforced)
Ginebra	3	11	1-2	1-2	1-7
Great Taste	3	6	0-2	0-3	3-1
Hills Bros	3	8	0-3	1-3	2-2
Magnolia / San Miguel	4	6	0-2	2-2	2-2
Tanduay	3	4	1-2	1-1	1-1
RP Team	2	1	2-1	N/A	N/A
Total	18	36	4-12	5-11	9-13

== Roster ==
1987 Shell Azocord Super Bugbusters roster
Players

Pos.	#	POB	Name	Height	Weight	DOB (YYYY–MM–DD)	From
C	1	(Philippines)	Manny Victorino	6 ft 5 in (1.96 m)			José Rizal
C	5	(Philippines)	Sonny Cabatu	6 ft 5 in (1.96 m)			PSBA
G	6	(Philippines)	Biboy Ravanes	6 ft 0 in (1.83 m)			Cebu
G	7	(Philippines)	Arturo Cristobal	6 ft 1 in (1.85 m)			Far Eastern
G	8	(Philippines)	Al Solis	5 ft 11 in (1.80 m)			Visayas
F/C	9	(Philippines)	Rey Cuenco	6 ft 4 in (1.93 m)			De La Salle Araneta
G	10	(Philippines)	Romeo Ang	6 ft 1 in (1.85 m)			Letran
G	11	(Philippines)	Jaime Manansala	5 ft 11 in (1.80 m)			UE
F	12	(Philippines)	Rey Lazaro	6 ft 2 in (1.88 m)			Far Eastern
G	13	(Philippines)	Leo Austria	5 ft 10 in (1.78 m)			Lyceum
F	14	(Philippines)	Leopoldo Herrera	6 ft 3 in (1.91 m)			Wesleyan Philippines
F	33	(United States)	Willie Pearson	6 ft 0 in (1.83 m)			Chaminade
F	71	(Philippines)	Manuel Marquez	6 ft 2 in (1.88 m)			San Beda

Coaches

Head coach

- (Philippines) Edgardo Ocampo
- (Philippines) Joe Lipa (3rd Conference)

Assistant coach(es)

- (Philippines) Freddie Gonzales

Team manager

- (Philippines) Marion Macalalad

Legend

- (C) Team captain
- Injured

=== Imports ===
Name	Conference	No.	Pos.	Ht.	College
Dwayne Randall	Open Conference	30	Forward	6"6'	Nevada-Reno
Michael Clarke	Open Conference	30	Forward	6"5'	
Calvin Thompson	Open Conference	35	Forward-Center	6"5'	University of Kansas
Dexter Shouse	Reinforced Conference	21	Guard-Forward	6"3'	University of South Alabama
Dwight Anderson	Reinforced Conference	0	Guard-Forward	6"3'	USC
