= 1987 Tanduay Rhum Makers season =

- Head coach: Arturo Valenzona; Eliezer Capacio
- Owners: Elizalde & Co.

Open Conference results
- Record: 18–9 (66.7%)
- Place: 1st
- Playoff finish: Champions

All-Filipino Conference results
- Record: 2–6 (25%)
- Place: 6th
- Playoff finish: N/A

Reinforced Conference results
- Record: 2–8 (20%)
- Place: 6th
- Playoff finish: N/A

Tanduay Rhum Makers seasons

The 1987 Tanduay Rhum Makers season was the 13th and final season of the franchise in the Philippine Basketball Association (PBA).

== Transactions ==
Players Added	Signed	Former team
Edgardo Cordero	Off-season	Manila Beer (disbanded)
Angelito Esguerra	Off-season	Manila Beer (disbanded)
Romulo Mamaril	Off-season	Ginebra
Cayetano Salazar ^{Rookie}	Off-season	N/A
Steve Watson	Off-season	Great Taste

== Notable dates ==
March 22: Tanduay overturned Great Taste on import David Thirdkill's shot with a foul from Michael Young in the last three seconds to escape with a 105-104 protested win in the second game of the season opener. The Rhum Makers rallied from 16 points down in the final quarter and Thirdkill intentionally missed his free throw and the ball didn't hit the rim, the referees failed to see the violation resulting to Great Taste's Ricardo Brown missing a hurried three-point attempt at the buzzer.

April 12: David Thirdkill scored 61 points as Tanduay pulled off a 129-124 double overtime triumph over arch rival Ginebra San Miguel in their first meeting of the season.

April 21: Willie Generalao struck with an off-balance desperation shot in the final second as Tanduay repeated over Great Taste, 121-120, and moved out front with six wins and one defeat at the start of the second round of eliminations of the Open Conference.

June 2: David Thirdkill scored his personal-best and conference-high 72 points to power the Rhum Makers past Great Taste, 136-124, for their second win in three games in the semifinals of the Open Conference.

June 9: Tanduay Rhum Makers overwhelmed Ginebra San Miguel, 122-104, to arrange a second finals meeting with Great Taste Coffee Makers for the Open Conference crown.

July 23: Ramon Fernandez scored 40 points as Tanduay ends their three-game slump in the All-Filipino Conference with their first victory, a 118-115 win over Magnolia.

October 6: After scoring only 11 points in his debut, Import Freeman Williams hit 10 three-point shots and finish with a season-high 82 points to lift Tanduay to a 129-122 victory over Hills Bros, now mentored by their former coach Arturo Valenzona. Williams' 82 point output was the league's all-time fourth-best at that time, behind Michael Hackett's 103 in 1985, Larry McNeill's 88 in 1983 and Lew Massey's 85 in 1982.

== Championship ==
The Tanduay Rhum Makers won its third PBA title in the last four conferences by winning the Open Conference crown over Great Taste Coffee, four games to one.

== Occurrences ==
Coach Arturo Valenzona was sacked and replaced by assistant coach Ely Capacio after Tanduay performed poorly in the All-Filipino Conference, winning only twice in eight games and were eliminated from the semifinal round. The Rhum Makers ended up last place again in the Reinforced Conference and bowed out with a humiliating 127-145 loss to Ginebra San Miguel on November 3.

The following year on January 16, 1988, the Elizalde-owned ballclub announced that they are taking a leave of absence from the PBA.

== Won-loss records vs Opponents ==
Team	Win	Loss	1st (Open)	2nd (All-Filipino)	3rd (Reinforced)
Ginebra	2	7	2-3	0-2	0-2
Great Taste	7	6	7-2	0-2	0-2
Hills Bros	4	2	3-0	0-1	1-1
Magnolia / San Miguel	4	4	3-2	1-0	0-2
Shell	4	3	2-1	1-1	1-1
RP Team	1	1	1-1	N/A	N/A
Total	22	23	18-9	2-6	2-8

== Roster ==
Tanduay Rhum Makers roster
Players
Coaches

Pos.	No.	Nat.	Name	Ht.	Wt.
F	3	(Philippines)	Edgardo Cordero	6 ft 4 in (1.93 m)		UST
F	5	(Philippines)	Steve Watson	6 ft 2 in (1.88 m)		Ateneo
G	7	(Philippines)	Antonio Torrente	6 ft 1 in (1.85 m)
G	9	(Philippines)	Onchie Dela Cruz	5 ft 11 in (1.80 m)		Philippine Christian
F	10	(Philippines)	Freddie Hubalde	6 ft 1 in (1.85 m)		Mapúa
C	11	(Philippines)	Cayetano Salazar	6 ft 5 in (1.96 m)		Letran
F	12	(Philippines)	Victor Sanchez	6 ft 3 in (1.91 m)		Mapúa
F	16	(Philippines)	Angelito Esguerra	6 ft 3 in (1.91 m)		Letran
F	17	(Philippines)	Padim Israel	6 ft 3 in (1.91 m)		Ateneo
C	19	(Philippines)	Ramon Fernandez	6 ft 4 in (1.93 m)		San Carlos
F	24	(Philippines)	Jose Yango	6 ft 3 in (1.91 m)		San Beda
C	33	(Philippines)	Romulo Mamaril	6 ft 6 in (1.98 m)		Mapúa
G	42	(Philippines)	Willie Generalao	5 ft 8 in (1.73 m)		Visayas

Head coach

- (Philippines) Arturo Valenzona
- (Philippines) Ely Capacio (3rd Conference)

Assistant coach(es)

- (Philippines) Ely Capacio
- (Philippines) Egay Gomez (3rd Conference)

Team manager

- (Philippines) Eddie Rivera

Legend

- (C) Team captain
- Injured

=== Imports ===
Name	Conference	No.	Pos.	Ht.	College
David Thirdkill	Open Conference	22	Center-Forward	6"6'	Bradley
Freeman Williams	Reinforced Conference	20	Forward	6"3'	PSU
