= 1987 Ginebra San Miguel season =

- Head coach: Robert Jaworski
- Owner: La Tondeña Distillers Inc.

Open Conference results
- Record: 12–14 (46.2%)
- Place: 4th
- Playoff finish: Semifinals

All-Filipino Conference results
- Record: 7–12 (36.8%)
- Place: 4th
- Playoff finish: Semifinals

Reinforced Conference results
- Record: 14–9 (60.9%)
- Place: 3rd
- Playoff finish: Semifinals

Ginebra San Miguel seasons

The 1987 Ginebra San Miguel season was the 9th season of the franchise in the Philippine Basketball Association (PBA).

== Transactions ==
Players Added	Signed	Former team
Harmon Codiñera ^{Rookie}	Off-season	N/A
Anthony Mendoza ^{Rookie}	Off-season	N/A
Zaldy Latoza	Off-season	Tanduay
Dennis Carbonilla ^{Rookie free agent}	July 1987	N/A
Rudy Distrito	July 1987	Alaska

== Notable dates ==
March 24: Defending Open Conference champion Ginebra San Miguel came back from 18 points down in the final period to roll back Formula Shell, 100-99 in overtime.

May 10: The Ginebras clawed back from 15 points down in the first half and caught up with Tanduay at 97-all at the end of the third quarter, then hung tough in the stretch for a 127-124 win to gain their fifth win against six defeats.

May 24: Ginebra came back strong from 15 points down in the final period to nip Hills Bros, 97-95, dropping a 16-0 bomb to wiped out an 81-95 deficit and silence the Coffee Kings in the last six minutes to pick up their eight win in 14 games and complete the semifinal cast of the Open Conference. The Ginebras lost forward Terry Saldaña for the entire season when he tore a cartilage in his left knee after a bad fall during the third quarter.

May 28: Michael Hackett calmly sank two free throws with 18 seconds left as the Ginebras stunned Great Taste, 119-118, at the start of the semifinal round in the Open Conference. The victory was the seventh straight for Ginebra.

May 31: Ageless Robert Jaworski pumped in three triples in the fourth quarter and import Michael Hackett's steal off David Thirdkill put the icing on Ginebra's 110-102 victory over Tanduay for their second win in the semifinals and extended their winning streak to eight.

July 12: Playing with only eight men, minus playing-coach Sonny Jaworski, who is still in the United States, the Ginebras stunned defending champion Tanduay Rhum Makers, 109-100, at the start of the All-Filipino Conference. Dondon Ampalayo topscored for Ginebra with 29 points while comebacking Rudy Distrito debut in Ginebra uniform tallying 18 points.

July 23: Rudy Distrito scored 42 points and hit the marginal basket with two seconds to go in overtime as Ginebra nips Great Taste, 120-119, for their second win in four starts while the Coffee Makers suffered their first defeat after three victories.

August 6: Ginebra eliminates the defending champions Tanduay Rhum Makers from the semifinals berth in a heart-stopping 106-103 victory on the last playing date of the eliminations in the All-Filipino Conference.

October 6: Ginebra repulses Great Taste Instant Milk, 125-122 in overtime, for their first win in the Reinforced Conference after losing their first game to San Miguel. Billy Ray Bates scored 52 points while Chito Loyzaga forces extension period when he nailed a three-pointer from the side that tied the count at 109-all with still 20 seconds to go in regulation.

October 25: The Ginebras rekindled the old fire in Billy Ray Bates to survive Shell Azocord's repeated rallies, 132-123, and collect their third win in seven outings. Bates match his career-highest of 69 points and fired five of seven three-pointers to power Ginebra to its biggest lead of 33 points, 72-39, early in the third quarter.

October 27: Billy Ray Bates scored 61 points as Ginebra clinch the fourth semifinals slot in the Reinforced Conference with a 125-101 win over Hills Bros.

November 8: Billy Ray Bates surpassed his personal best of 69-point output by scoring 71 points in Ginebras' 118–106 win over Shell Azocord at the start of the semifinals.

November 22: Billy Ray Bates equalled his personal high of 71 points as Ginebra foiled San Miguel Beer's quest for a finals berth with a 143-121 triumph. The win was only the third for Ginebra in 20 meetings against their sister team, it also snapped their seven straight losses to San Miguel counting the previous All-Filipino Conference.

November 29: Ginebra forces a winner-take-all, sudden death playoff for the second finals slot against Hills Bros by defeating the Coffee Kings, 90-85.

== Occurrences ==
Before the PBA Third Conference started on October 4, the league mourns the loss of Ginebra team manager Adolf Ferrer, who was a victim of a brutal slaying by robbers headed by his own driver.

== Won-loss records vs Opponents ==
Team	Win	Loss	1st (Open)	2nd (All-Filipino)	3rd (Reinforced)
Great Taste	4	7	1-3	1-2	2-2
Hills Bros	6	6	3-0	1-3	2-3
Magnolia / San Miguel	3	17	1-8	1-6	1-3
Shell	11	3	2-1	2-1	7-1
Tanduay	7	2	3-2	2-0	2-0
RP Team	2	0	2-0	N/A	N/A
Total	33	35	12-14	7-12	14-9

== Roster ==
1987 Ginebra San Miguel roster
Players

Pos.	#	POB	Name	Height	Weight	DOB (YYYY–MM–DD)	From
G	5	(Philippines)	Mukesh Advani	5 ft 11 in (1.80 m)			San Beda
F	6	(Philippines)	Dondon Ampalayo	6 ft 3 in (1.91 m)			USJ–R
G	7	(Philippines)	Robert Jaworski	6 ft 1 in (1.85 m)			UE
G	9	(Philippines)	Leo Isaac	6 ft 1 in (1.85 m)			Mapúa
C	10	(Philippines)	Eduardo Ducut	6 ft 5 in (1.96 m)			Letran
F	11	(Philippines)	Zaldy Latoza	6 ft 2 in (1.88 m)			Trinity
F	12	(Philippines)	Dante Gonzalgo	6 ft 2 in (1.88 m)			Lyceum
F	13	(Philippines)	Antero Saldaña	6 ft 3 in (1.91 m)			Letran
G	14	(Philippines)	Joey Loyzaga	6 ft 0 in (1.83 m)			San Beda
F	15	(Philippines)	Anthony Mendoza	6 ft 4 in (1.93 m)			Visayas
G	17	(Philippines)	Rudy Distrito	5 ft 11 in (1.80 m)			UE
F	18	(Philippines)	Dennis Carbonilla	6 ft 4 in (1.93 m)			Letran
F	41	(Philippines)	Chito Loyzaga	6 ft 2 in (1.88 m)			San Beda
F	50	(Philippines)	Harmon Codiñera	6 ft 4 in (1.93 m)			Far Eastern

Coaches

Head coach

- (Philippines) Robert Jaworski

Assistant coach(es)

- (Philippines) Rino Salazar

Team manager

- (Philippines) Adolf Ferrer

Legend

- (C) Team captain
- Injured

=== Imports ===
Name	Conference	No.	Pos.	Ht.	College
Michael Hackett	Open Conference	00	Forward-Center	6"5'	Jacksonville University
Billy Ray Bates	Reinforced Conference	2	Guard-Forward	6"3'	Kentucky State University
