= Allan Caidic =

Filipino basketball player, coach and executive

UE Red Warriors
- Title: Team consultant
- League: UAAP

Personal information
- Born: June 15, 1963 (age 63) Pasig, Rizal, Philippines
- Listed height: 6 ft 2 in (1.88 m)
- Listed weight: 173 lb (78 kg)

Career information
- High school: Roosevelt College (Cainta, Rizal)
- College: UE
- PBA draft: 1987: 1st round1st overall
- Drafted by: Great Taste Coffee Makers
- Playing career: 1987–1999
- Position: Shooting guard

Career history

Playing
- 1987–1992: Great Taste Coffee Makers/Presto Tivoli
- 1993–1998: San Miguel Beermen
- 1999: Barangay Ginebra Kings

Career highlights
- As player: 5× PBA champion (1985 Reinforced, 1987 All-Filipino, 1990 All-Filipino, 1993 Governors', 1994 All-Filipino); PBA Most Valuable Player (1990); PBA Rookie of the Year (1987); 6× PBA Mythical First Team (1987–1991, 1995); 2× PBA Mythical Second Team (1993–1994); PBA Best Player of the Conference (1995 Governors'); 5× PBA scoring champion (1988–1991, 1995); 8× PBA All-Star (1989, 1990, 1991, 1992, 1993, 1994, 1995, 1998); PBA All-Star Game MVP (1993); PBA Three-Point Shootout champion (1992); 50 Greatest Players in PBA History (2000 selection); PBA Hall of Fame Class of 2009; 3x UAAP champion (1982, 1984, 1985); 3x UAAP Most Valuable Player (1982, 1984, 1985); 4x UAAP Mythical Five (1982, 1984–1986); 2x Asian Games Basketball Mythical Five Selection; PBL 20 Greatest Players of All-Time; FIBA Asia Cup MVP (1985); As assistant coach: PBA champion (2008 Fiesta); UAAP champion (2013); As executive (team manager): 2× PBA champion (2004 Fiesta, 2004–05 Philippine)
Medals
Men's basketball
Representing Philippines
ABC Championship
Gold medal – first place	1985 Kuala Lumpur	Team
Asian Games
Bronze medal – third place	1986 Seoul	Team
Silver medal – second place	1990 Beijing	Team
Bronze medal – third place	1998 Bangkok	Team
SEA Games
Gold medal – first place	1985 Bangkok	Team
William Jones Cup
Gold medal – first place	1998 Taipei	Team

Allan Vito Flores Caidic (born June 15, 1963) is a Filipino former professional basketball player, coach and executive who is currently serving as team consultant for UE Red Warriors of the University Athletic Association of the Philippines (UAAP). He is considered by many to be the greatest shooter the country has ever produced, thus, earning the moniker, "The Triggerman".

He played college hoops at the University of the East before joining the PBA in 1987, where he broke several Philippine and PBA all-time records—including the most points scored in a single game (79 points), the most three-point field goals made in a single game (17 triples; breaking his previous record of 15 triples), the most consecutive freethrows made (76), and the most three-point field goals in a career (1,242 triples; later surpassed by Jimmy Alapag and Marcio Lassiter). He has played with several PBA teams and won numerous championships. He played for the Philippine national basketball team including the 1998 Philippine Centennial Team.

While in the league, he was considered one of the best three-point shooters in Asia. The vaunted Chinese national basketball team recognized his ability by always reminding their players to be on the lookout for "Philippine No. 8", referring to Caidic's regular jersey number while playing for the National Team.

== Playing career ==
=== High school, college and amateur career ===
Caidic is from Paete, Laguna and started playing basketball when he was in his fifth grade at Roosevelt College and in the Inter Subdivision Leagues at Brookside in Cainta before trying out for college teams such as the Ateneo Blue Eagles and the Mapua Cardinals but was unsuccessful. He then tried out for the Letran Knights and was accepted. But after realizing that Letran does not have an engineering program, he left. Allan was then taking up Mechanical Engineering. He was later accepted in University of the East (UE) but had to sit out on the reserve list as UE's lineup was already complete. Finally in 1981 under coach Roberto Flores, Caidic got his break and delivered well. In a deciding game between the UE Red Warriors and the FEU Tamaraws, Caidic missed two crucial free throws that handed the UAAP championship to the unbeaten Tamaraws. In 1982, he bounced back by leading the Red Warriors to a comeback win against the UP Fighting Maroons in the finals, scoring 30 points to capture the UAAP basketball championship and won the Most Valuable Player award.

In 1983, Caidic was seeded number one in the UAAP one-on-one championships. Unfortunately, he only placed second to UST's rookie Silverio Palad. In his final two years, he, along with Jerry Codiñera, led the Red Warriors to back-to-back championships in 1984–1985, the last University of the East basketball team ever to win a championship in the 20th Century. At the same time, he played for several teams in the Philippine Amateur Basketball League while playing for the national team.

He played for several PABL teams such as CF Sharp, ESQ Marketing and the Magnolia Ice Cream/Lagerlite. He also played for commercial teams internationally, notably the Development Bank of Rizal (1983) that finished third in an invitational tournament in Malaysia and the Country Fair Hotdogs in the 1984 William Jones Cup tournament.

=== Northern Consolidated National Team ===
In 1984–1985, Caidic was part of Danding Cojuangco's national basketball development program, which formed a team that represented the Philippines in international competitions, which aimed win the 1986 Asian Basketball Confederation crown (now known as the FIBA Asia Championship) which was last won by the Philippines in 1973.

In the 1985 William Jones Cup, Caidic played in the San Miguel Beer-Philippines' overtime victory against the US, coached by Gene Keady, in the finals. His shooting mentor, Arthur "Chip" Engelland, scored 43 points while Caidic scored 21, to lead the Filipinos in a 108–100 overtime victory to capture the Jones Cup title. Keady, later, told Ron Jacobs that he had the highest respect for two Filipino cagers whom he called 'Heckle and Jeckle' (referring to Allan Caidic and Samboy Lim).

He led the Philippines in capturing the 1985 South East Asian Games Gold Medal and in 1986, he led the last all-amateur national team to capture the FIBA Asia Championship gold medal and scored 22 points in an 82–72 win over China in the finals. After winning the Asian Championship, the Philippines qualified for the 1986 FIBA World Championship at Madrid, Spain, but due to the political crisis in the country (that led to the 1986 Philippine People Power EDSA Revolution), the national team did not participate in the tournament. He is a four-time Asian Games veteran as a player and shared this distinction with Alvin Patrimonio, as the only PBA players to play in four Asiads (1986, 1990, 1994, 1998). In 1986, he led an all-amateur national team to an Asian Games bronze medal, after a heart breaking controversial loss to South Korea in the semi-final. He is also the only Filipino player to win the William Jones Cup championships twice, once as an amateur in 1985 and once as a professional in 1998.

=== PBA career ===
==== Great Taste/Presto Tivoli ====
In 1984–1985, Caidic played in the PBA for the all-amateur guest NCC national team, preparing for international competitions, and went on to win the 1985 PBA Reinforced Conference. In 1986, he returned to the PBA playing for the all-amateur Magnolia-Philippines who were at that time preparing for the 1986 Asian Games.

In 1987, he was drafted first overall by the Great Taste Coffee Makers and played alongside Ricardo Brown to lead the team to the PBA Open Conference finals (In Game 3, he equalled Brown's PBA all-time record for the most points scored by a Filipino in a single finals game – 48 points) and later captured his first PBA-All Filipino Cup championship. In his rookie season, he earned the 1987 PBA Rookie of the Year award and was named in the All-Star Mythical Five Selection, where he became the third first year-rookie player ever to be named in the Mythical Five Selection after Arnie Tuadles (1979) and Ricardo Brown (1983). He also finished the season as the first rookie player ever to lead the league in scoring.

On November 2, 1989, Caidic scored 68 points and 15 three-point field goals made in a single game to lead Presto Tivoli past the Alaska Air Force in a high-scoring overtime game 175–159. Both teams' combined points was one of the most in the PBA history.

In 1990, he set the PBA all-time record for the most three-point field goals made in a single season (160 triples) and led Presto Tivoli to a championship title. He was named the 1990 PBA Most Valuable Player and was selected to play for the first all-pro national team coached by Robert Jaworski, bound for the Asian Games. In one of his Asian Games appearances, he led the national team's second half comeback win, 86–78, against Japan with 34 points despite playing with a broken hand and held scoreless in the first half. The Philippines went on to win the silver medal after losing to China in the finals with Caidic and Samboy Lim named in the mythical 5 selection.

On October 15, 1991, he broke the PBA all-time record for the most three-point field goals made in a career with 594 three-point conversions after scoring 9 triples in Tivoli's 125–142 loss to Pepsi.

One month later, on November 21, 1991, Caidic sets the PBA all-time records of the most points in a single game by a homegrown Filipino player (79 points), the most points in a single half (53 points), the most points in a single quarter (37 points), the most three-point field goals made and attempts in a game (17/27 triples), the most three-point field goals made in a quarter (8 triples) and the most consecutive three-point field goals made in a single game (8 triples), to lead Presto Tivoli against Ginebra San Miguel. His performance remains as one of the greatest individual performances in the PBA history. What makes it more remarkable is that while he was playing in the court, his wife Millote was giving birth to their first daughter. He came off the bench late in the first quarter and left the game in the middle of the fourth, in a game where he could have possibly scored 100 points or more.

==== San Miguel Beermen ====
In 1993, Caidic was acquired by the San Miguel Beermen after his former team was sold to Sta. Lucia Realty & Development, Inc. and renamed Sta. Lucia Realtors. During his time with San Miguel, he teamed up with Samboy Lim to form the league's deadliest scoring duo in the 1990s and led the Beermen to the 1993 All-Filipino Cup finals. He ended the season winning the PBA Governor's Cup championship with San Miguel and earned the 1993 PBA All-Star Most Valuable Player award after leading his team (North All-Star) to victory, scoring 40 points (second highest points scored in a single All-Star game) and 9 triples (the most three-point field goals made in a single All-Star game). He became the first PBA player ever to win the MVP awards in the regular season and in the All-Star Game.

In 1994, San Miguel won the right to represent the country in the Asian Games after winning the PBA All-Filipino Cup conference title. In the Asian Games, the Beermen formed the core of the national team with some loaned players from the other PBA ballclubs like Alvin Patrimonio and Johnny Abarrientos. The national team finished fourth but he finished as the Asian Games basketball tournament leading scorer and was named in the all-tournament Mythical Five Selection.

In 1995, he became the eighth player to score 10,000 career points in the PBA history and the league's first player to score 1,000 career three-point field goals. He went on to win the PBA Governor's Cup Best Player of the Conference after leading the San Miguel Beermen to the finals. He finished the season as the league's leading point scorer with 20.9 points per game, the last guard ever to lead the league in season-best points scoring average in the 20th century.

On April 29, 1997, in a game between the Gordon's Gin and the San Miguel Beermen, he suffered a serious career-threatening injury. The incident took place when he jumped for a rebound, he collided with teammate Nelson Asaytono, fell on the floor headfirst, vomited, and remained on the court motionless before he was removed from the arena and taken to the hospital.

He made a successful recovery from that injury and in 1998, he was selected by Tim Cone for the Philippine Centennial Team bound for the William Jones Cup (where he scored 25 points with six triples against South East Asian rival, Thailand) and the Asian Games. The team started their international campaign against China and a PBA All-Star Selection but had a dismal display in the PBA Centennial Cup. They went to a tough United States midwest tour and won the William Jones Cup in Taiwan. In the Asian Games, the nationals easily won their group stage but lost in the semi-final and settled for third after beating Kazakhstan in their final game.

== Post-playing career, retirement and coaching ==
In 1999, Caidic became the playing coach of the Barangay Ginebra Kings after a sudden resignation of interim coach Rino Salazar.

In 2000, as a playing coach, he placed himself in the reserved unprotected player list for the Barangay Ginebra Kings to protect other important players in the team. The expansion team Red Bull picked unprotected players from the dispersal draft, which includes himself and got his rights. To avoid leaving Ginebra and playing for Red Bull, he announced his retirement and decided to hang up his jersey that year. His early retirement ended a long distinguished career that started in 1984 as an amateur guest player in the PBA. He also became the third PBA player after Ramon Fernandez and Bogs Adornado to be given the honor of retiring the jersey number by a PBA team and was the first by two PBA teams, the San Miguel Beermen and the Barangay Ginebra Kings. Both franchises retired his number 8 jersey in honor of his legacy in the PBA. In the same year, he was named in the PBA 25 greatest players ever to play in the league's history after the PBA celebrated its 25th year as the first professional basketball league in Asia.

After his retirement, he remained with Ginebra as a full-time head coach and despite reaching the 2001 PBA All-Filipino Cup finals, he piloted Ginebra to one of its worst season runs in its franchise history. Due to fans' uproar, management blinked and promoted him as Team Manager in 2004. He also served as the national team's assistant coach in 2002 and was an active participant of the San Miguel Corporation All-Stars, a group composed of several former professional basketball players.

In May 2005, he took part in the PBA's 30th Anniversary, leading Virgilio Dalupan's Legends Team to victory, 96–92, in the PBA's Classic Greatest Game with an MVP performance, scoring 30 points (4 triples, 8 rebounds). He also led the PBA Legends Team to a two-game Australian Tour Series and earned himself the series Most Valuable Player award. He was then appointed Sports Ambassador to represent the Philippines in the 23rd South East Asian Games alongside some of the Philippines' greatest athletes (Efren Reyes, Rafael Nepomuceno) to promote the event throughout the country. Aside from being one of the country's Sports Ambassador, he also served as San Miguel Corporation's Philippine Baseball and Boxing Project Director/Liaison Officer for the South East Asian Games. His teams brought 10 gold medals (1 from baseball and 9 from boxing) for the country.

On June 15, 2006, on his 43rd birthday, he fittingly released his autobiographical book, "My Life Allan Caidic, The Triggerman", one of the first sports biographies by a Filipino athlete. In November 2006, after a reshuffling between the then-four San Miguel Corporation teams, he became the team manager of the Coca-Cola Tigers. But he left in March 2007 to become assistant coach of the Barangay Ginebra Kings.

In January 2007, he joined with former national teammates Hector Calma and Samboy Lim, as well as former national team head coaches, current national team members and head coach Chot Reyes in expressing their support to Samahang Basketbol ng Pilipinas (SBP) and for the lifting of suspension of the country from FIBA-sanctioned tournaments.

In 2008, he joined several PBA legends in a charity Tour of California but played a minor role due to personal commitments. Later that year, he led the PBA Legends to victory over the Manny Pacquiao-led Philippine Army Basketball Team to commemorate the 75th anniversary of the army.

In August 2009, he joined another PBA legends' tour in North America, and weeks later he led a PBA All-Star Selection (scoring five straight triples in the quarter) against Dominique Wilkins'-led NBA Generations.

On August 27, 2010, he scored 54 points during the 2010 NBA Asia Basketball Challenge held at Araneta Coliseum in Quezon City. He also defeated Glen Rice, 7–5 in a three-point shooting contest. Their team won 177–167.

He was formally an assistant coach of the Barangay Ginebra San Miguel under coach Tim Cone in the PBA and the De La Salle Green Archers in the UAAP.

On December 11, 2018, he scored 146 points in an exhibition game in Ilocos Sur and having 46 three-pointers in a game. His team won 184–73.

On October 24, 2023, he was appointed as the commissioner for the Pilipinas Super League.

== Awards and achievements ==
=== Career PBA highlights ===
==== Individual achievements ====
- PBA Hall of Fame (2009)
- PBA Top 25 Greatest Players of all time (2000)
- PBA Most Valuable Player 1990
- PBA Rookie of the Year 1987
- PBA Mythical First Team Selection in 1987, 1988, 1989, 1990, 1991, and 1995
- PBA Mythical Second Team Selection in 1993 and 1994
- PBA Best Player of the Conference (1995 PBA Governor's Cup)
- PBA All-Star Games (1989, 1990, 1991, 1992, 1993, 1994, 1995)
- PBA All-Star Game Most Valuable Player (1993)
- PBA All-Star Three-Points Shootout Challenge champion (individual event) 1991 and 1992
- PBA All-Star Three-Points Shootout Challenge champion (team event) 1991
- PBA Career Achievement Award 10,000 Points
- PBA Career Achievement Award 5,000 Points
- PBA Career Achievement Award 1,000 Three-Points
- PBA Career Achievement Award 500 Steals

==== Team achievements ====
- 1985 PBA Reinforced Conference champions
- 1987 PBA-IBA World Challenge Cup finalists
- 1987 PBA Open Conference finalists
- 1987 PBA All-Filipino Cup Conference champions
- 1990 PBA All-Filipino Cup Conference champions
- 1993 PBA All-Filipino Cup Conference finalists
- 1993 PBA Governor's Cup Conference champions
- 1994 PBA All-Filipino Cup Conference champions
- 1995 PBA Governor's Cup Conference finalists
- 1998 PBA All-Filipino Cup Conference finalists – playing assistant coach
- 1998 PBA Commissioner's Cup Conference finalists – playing assistant coach
- 1998 PBA Governor's Cup Conference, fourth place – playing assistant coach
- 1999 PBA All-Filipino Cup Conference, third place – playing assistant coach

==== Philippine Basketball Association all-time records ====
- Most points scored in a single game by a Filipino (79) - November 21, 1991
- Most points scored in a single half (53) - November 21, 1991
- Most points scored in a single quarter (37) - November 21, 1991
- Most points scored in a single finals game by a Filipino (48) - 1987 PBA Open Conference
- Most number of three-point field goals made in a single game (17) - November 21, 1991
- Most number of three-point field goals attempts in a single game (27) - November 21, 1991
- Most number of three-point field goals made in a single quarter (9) - November 21, 1991
- Most number of three-point field goals made in a single All-Star game (9) - June 6, 1993
- Most consecutive free-throw shots made (76) - October 22, 1992 - May 11, 1993
- Most number of three-point shots made in a single season (160) - 1990 PBA season
- First Player to score 1000 career three-points field goal made in the PBA history - July 12, 1995
- Third highest points scored in a single game scored by a Filipino (68) - November 2, 1989
- Third highest points scored in a single quarter (27) - November 2, 1989
- Third highest points scored in a single All-Star game (40) - June 6, 1993
- Second highest number of three-point field goals made in a single game (15) - November 2, 1989
- Sixth highest points scored in a single game by a Filipino (59) - 1988
- Sixth highest points scored in a single game by a player (both locals/imports) (79) – November 21, 1991

===== Former records =====
- Most number of three-point shots made in a career (1,242) - 1987-1999 (surpassed by Jimmy Alapag)

=== College achievements ===
==== Individual achievements ====
- University Athletic Association of the Philippines College Basketball Most Valuable Player (1982, 1984, 1985)
- UAAP College Basketball Mythical Five Selection (1982, 1984, 1985, 1986)
- PABL Mythical Five Selection (1985, 1986)
- Philippine Basketball League Top 20 Greatest Players of all time (2003)
- PBL Legacy Team: 12 All-time Best players in history (2000)

==== Team achievements ====
- 1982 UAAP-Manila College Basketball Champions
- 1982 UAAP National College Basketball third place
- 1983 UAAP-Manila College Basketball third place
- 1984 UAAP-Manila College Basketball Champions
- 1984 UAAP National College Basketball Champions
- 1985 UAAP-Manila College Basketball Champions
- 1985 UAAP National College Basketball Champions
- 1985 Philippine Association of Colleges and Universities Basketball Champions
- 1985 Philippine Amateur Basketball League (PABL) Invitational Cup Finalists
- 1986 UAAP-Manila College Basketball Champions
- 1986 UAAP National College Basketball second place
- 1986 Philippine Amateur Basketball League Champions

==== College and amateur basketball all-time records ====
- Career all-time PBL record leader for most three-point field goals made in a single game (15 triples) - 1986
- Career all-time UAAP record leader for most three-point field goals made in a single game (10 triples) - August 1985
- Career all-time National UAAP leader for most three-point field goals made in a single game (9 triples) - UAAP
- Second career all-time UAAP record leader for most points scored in a single finals game (48 points) - 1985
- Third career all-time UAAP record leader for most points scored in a single finals game (42 points) - 1985

=== International career highlights ===
Club and Country

- 1982 ASEAN School Youth Basketball Championship champions
- 1983 Asian Invitational Basketball Tournament, third place
- 1984 William Jones Cup
- 1985 Pesta Sukan Basketball Championship champions
- 1985 William Jones Cup champions
- 1985 FIBA Club World Cup, 7th place
- 1985 South East Asian Games champions
- 1985 ABC Championship champions
  - 1985 ABC Championship Most Valuable Player
  - 1985 ABC Championship Mythical Team member
- 1986 Asian Games, third place (bronze medal)
- 1986 Guam Friendship Games Basketball Tournament champions
  - 1986 Guam Tournament Most Valuable Player (1986)
- 1990 Asian Games, second place (silver medal)
  - 1990 Asian Games Mythical Team member
- 1991 China-PBA All-Stars Goodwill Exhibition Series
- 1994 Asian Games, fourth place
  - 1994 Asian Games Tournament top scorer
  - 1994 Asian Games Mythical Team member
- 1998 Philippines-PBA All-Stars Selection Goodwill Series
- 1998 PBA Centennial Cup
- 1998 William Jones Cup champions
- 1998 Philippine Tour of the United States
- 1998 Asian Games, third place (bronze medal)

=== Coaching/managerial career achievements ===
- 1998 PBA All-Filipino Cup Conference Finalists – playing assistant coach
- 1998 PBA Commissioner's Cup Conference Finalists – playing assistant coach
- 1998 PBA Governor's Cup Conference, fourth place – playing assistant coach
- 1999 PBA All-Filipino Cup Conference, third place – playing assistant coach
- 2001 PBA All-Filipino Cup Conference Finalists - Head Coach
- 2001 PBA All-Stars Game Head Coach
- 2002 Philippines-Chinese-Taipei Goodwill Series winner, Assistant Coach
- 2002 Philippines-Qatar Goodwill Series winner, Assistant Coach
- 2002 Philippines-Melbourne Tigers Goodwill Series, Assistant Coach
- 2002 Euro Basketball Challenge Four Nations Invitational (Philippines Tour of Europe), third place, Assistant Coach
- 2002 Asian Games, fourth place, Assistant Coach
- 2004 PBA Fiesta Cup Conference Champions - Team Manager
- 2004-05 PBA All-Filipino Cup Conference Champions - Team Manager
- 2005-06 PBA Fiesta Cup Conference, fourth place - Team Manager
- 2008 PBA Fiesta Cup Conference Champions - Assistant Coach
- 2009 PBA Fiesta Cup Conference Finalists - Assistant Coach
- 2011 PBA Commissioner's Cup Conference Finalists - Assistant Coach
- 2012 PBA Legends Game - Playing Coach of the Stalwart Team
- 2013 PBA Commissioner's Cup Conference Finalists - Assistant Coach
- 2013 University Athletics Association of the Philippines (UAAP) Champions - Assistant Coach
- 2013 Philippine Collegiate Champions League (PCCL) Champions - Assistant Coach

=== Other achievements ===
- PBA All-Star Legends Shootout Challenge champion (2004)
- PBA Classic All-Star Greatest Game (2005)
- PBA Classic All-Star Greatest Game Most Valuable Player (2005)
- PBA Legends Tour of Australia (2005)
- PBA Legends Tour of Australia Series Most Valuable Player (2005)
- 2005 Philippine South East Asian Games Sports Ambassador
- NBA Asia Challenge (2009, 2010)
- ASEAN Chinese Veterans Basketball Championship Over-50 champions (2016, 2017)
- World Chinese Veterans Basketball Championship Over-50 champions (2016)

== See also ==
- Philippine Basketball Association
- Philippine national basketball team
- Northern Consolidated Cement / San Miguel Beer
- Barangay Ginebra Kings
- San Miguel Beermen
- Great Taste Coffee Makers/Presto Tivoli
- Philippine Centennial Team
- History of Philippine Basketball

== Publications and articles ==
- Bocobo, Christian and Celis, Beth, Legends and Heroes of Philippine Basketball, (Philippines, 2004)
- Caidic, Allan, My Life: Allan Caidic The Triggerman, (Philippines, 2006)
- Dela Cruz, Juan, Book of Pinoy Facts and Records, (National Bookstore, Mandaluyong, Philippines, 2004)
- King, Jenny, Great and Famous Filipinos, 2nd Edition, (Worldlink Books, Philippines, 2002)
- OFW Guardian, Mr. Inside and Mr. Out, Sport, OFW Guardian, https://web.archive.org/web/20070930003521/http://www.ofwguardian.com/article.php/I29mrinside, (2006)
- Philippine Basketball Association, The First 25 Years, (Philippines, 2000)
