= 1987 PBA season =

13th PBA season

- Duration: March 22 – December 13, 1987
- Teams: 6
- TV partner: Vintage Sports (PTV)

1987 PBA Draft
- Top draft pick: Allan Caidic
- Picked by: Great Taste Coffee Makers
- Season MVP: Abet Guidaben (San Miguel Beermen)
- Open Conference champions: Tanduay Rhum Makers
- Open Conference runners-up: Great Taste Coffee Makers
- All-Filipino Conference champions: Great Taste Coffee Makers
- All-Filipino Conference runners-up: Hills Bros. Coffee Kings
- Reinforced Conference champions: San Miguel Beermen
- Reinforced Conference runners-up: Hills Bros. Coffee Kings

Seasons
- ← 1986 1988 →

The 1987 PBA season was the 13th season of the Philippine Basketball Association (PBA).

== Board of governors ==
=== Executive committee ===
- Mariano A. Yenko, Jr. (Commissioner)
- Rodriguo Salud (Deputy Commissioner)
- Reynaldo Marquez (Chairman, representing Formula Shell)
- Jose Ibazeta (Vice Chairman, representing Magnolia Ice Cream)
- Wilfred Steven Uytengsu (Treasurer, representing Hills Bros. Coffee Kings)

=== Teams ===
Team	Company	Governor
Forumula Shell	Pilipinas Shell Petroleum Corporation	Reynaldo Marquez
Ginebra San Miguel	La Tondeña Incorporada	Carlos Palanca III
Great Taste Coffee Makers	Consolidated Foods Corporation	James Go
Hills Bros. Coffee Kings	G.F. Equity Inc.	Wilfred Steven Uytengsu
Magnolia Ice Cream Makers	San Miguel Corporation	Jose C. Ibazeta
Tanduay Rhum Makers	Elizalde & Company; Tanduay Distillers, Inc.	Renato Reyes

== Season highlights ==
- Manila Beer disbanded its franchise at the start of the season, reducing the league's membership to only 6 teams, their players were absorbed by the rest of the PBA ballclubs.
- The PBA, in partnership with a newly formed league called International Basketball Association (IBA) of the United States for players 6–4 and below, staged a successful mini-tournament for one week, featuring the top PBA All-Filipino teams and the US (IBA) Selection.
- Tanduay Rhum Makers, which won the Open Conference crown, were eliminated and finish last in the succeeding two conferences, announces that the team is headed for disbandment the following year, leaving only two founding members of the PBA (San Miguel and Great Taste).
- The San Miguel Beermen, behind best import Bobby Parks, won the Reinforced Conference crown and their third PBA title since returning in the third conference of last year. SMB coach Norman Black won his first championship as a mentor and he became the third American to steer his team to a PBA title after Jerry Webber and Ron Jacobs.

== Opening ceremonies ==
The muses for the participating teams are as follows:

Team	Muse
Formula Shell	Pinky Amador
Ginebra San Miguel	Bing Loyzaga
Great Taste Coffee Makers	Tina Abad
Hills Bros. Coffee Kings	Joey Albert
Magnolia Ice Cream	Rachel Ann Wolfe
Philippine Team	Marichit Vergara
Tanduay Rhum Makers	Cassandra Romero

== Champions ==
- Open Conference: Tanduay Rhum Makers
- All-Filipino Conference: Great Taste Coffee Makers
- Reinforced Conference: San Miguel Beermen
- Team with best win–loss percentage: Magnolia/San Miguel Beermen (43–23, .652)
- Best Team of the Year: Great Taste Coffee Makers (3rd & Final)

== Open Conference ==
=== Elimination round ===
Pos	Team	W	L	PCT	GB	Qualification
1	Great Taste Coffee Makers	10	2	.833	—	Advance to semifinal round
2	Magnolia Ice Cream Makers	9	3	.750 (Note: Semifinal berth playoff: Magnolia 108–98 Tanduay)	1	Advance to semifinal round
3	Tanduay Rhum Makers	9	3	.750	1	Proceed to quarterfinal round
4	Ginebra San Miguel	6	6	.500	4	Proceed to quarterfinal round
5	Hills Bros. Coffee Kings	4	8	.333	6	Proceed to quarterfinal round
6	Formula Shell Spark Aiders	2	10	.167 (Note: Quarterfinal berth playoff: Shell 120–111 Philippine team)	8	Proceed to quarterfinal round
7	Philippine national team (G)	2	10	.167	8	

(G) Guests

=== Quarterfinal round ===
Pos	Team	W	L	PCT	GB	Qualification
3	Tanduay Rhum Makers	10	5	.667	—	Semifinal round
4	Ginebra San Miguel	9	6	.600	1	Semifinal round
5	Hills Bros. Coffee Kings	5	10	.333	5	
6	Formula Shell Spark Aiders	3	12	.200	7	

=== Semifinal round ===
Pos	Team	W	L	PCT	GB	Qualification
1	Great Taste Coffee Makers	4	2	.667 (Note: Head-to-head record: Great Taste 1–1 Tanduay, Great Taste +2)	—	Advance to the Finals
2	Tanduay Rhum Makers	4	2	.667	—	Advance to the Finals
3	Magnolia Ice Cream Makers	2	4	.333 (Note: Head-to-head record: Magnolia 2–0 Ginebra)	2	Proceed to third place playoffs
4	Ginebra San Miguel	2	4	.333	2	Proceed to third place playoffs

=== Third place playoffs ===
Team 1	Series	Team 2	Game 1	Game 2	Game 3	Game 4	Game 5	Game 6	Game 7
(3) Magnolia Ice Cream Makers	4–1	(4) Ginebra San Miguel	103–96	91–97	105–76	98–91	106–101	—	—

=== Finals ===
Team 1	Series	Team 2	Game 1	Game 2	Game 3	Game 4	Game 5	Game 6	Game 7
(1) Great Taste Coffee Makers	1–4	(2) Tanduay Rhum Makers	114–118	134–135 (OT)	120–114	112–113	120–134	—	—

- Best Import of the Conference: David Thirdkill (Tanduay)

== All-Filipino Conference ==
=== Elimination round ===
Pos	Team	W	L	PCT	GB	Qualification
1	Hills Bros. Coffee Kings	5	3	.625	—	Semifinal round
2	Great Taste Coffee Makers	5	3	.625	—	Semifinal round
3	Magnolia Ice Cream Makers	4	4	.500	1	Semifinal round
4	Formula Shell Spark Aiders	4	4	.500	1	Semifinal round
5	Ginebra San Miguel	4	4	.500	1	Semifinal round
6	Tanduay Rhum Makers	2	6	.250	3	

=== Semifinal round ===
Pos	Team	W	L	PCT	GB	Qualification
1	Hills Bros. Coffee Kings	7	1	.875	—	Advance to the Finals
2	Great Taste Coffee Makers	6	2	.750	1	Advance to the Finals
3	Magnolia Ice Cream Makers	3	5	.375	4	Proceed to third place playoffs
4	Ginebra San Miguel	3	5	.375	4	Proceed to third place playoffs
5	Formula Shell Spark Aiders	1	7	.125	6	

=== Third place playoffs ===
Team 1	Series	Team 2	Game 1	Game 2	Game 3	Game 4	Game 5
(3) Magnolia Ice Cream Makers	3–0	(4) Ginebra San Miguel	102–98 (OT)	101–98 (OT)	106–105	—	—

=== Finals ===
Team 1	Series	Team 2	Game 1	Game 2	Game 3	Game 4	Game 5
(1) Hills Bros. Coffee Kings	0–3	(2) Great Taste Coffee Makers	94–124	110–114	108–109	—	—

== Reinforced Conference ==
=== Elimination round ===
Pos	Team	W	L	PCT	GB	Qualification
1	Shell Azocord Super Bugbusters	7	3	.700	—	Semifinal round
2	San Miguel Beermen	6	4	.600	1	Semifinal round
3	Hills Bros. Coffee Kings	6	4	.600	1	Semifinal round
4	Ginebra San Miguel	5	5	.500	2	Semifinal round
5	Great Taste Instant Milk	4	6	.400	3	Semifinal round
6	Tanduay Rhum Makers	2	8	.200	5	

=== Semifinal round ===
Overall record
Pos	Team	W	L	PCT	GB	Qualification
1	San Miguel Beermen	13	5	.722	—	Advance to the Finals (Note: If a team outside the top two teams wins at least five semifinal round games, then it and the second-placed team will playoff for the last Finals berth; otherwise, the top 2 teams qualify outright.)
2	Hills Bros. Coffee Kings	10	8	.556 (Note: Second seed playoff: Hills Bros. 89–87 Ginebra)	3	Guaranteed Finals berth playoff
3	Ginebra San Miguel	10	8	.556	3	Qualify to Finals berth playoff
4	Shell Azocord Super Bugbusters	9	9	.500	4	Proceed to third place playoffs
5	Great Taste Instant Milk	6	12	.333	7	

Notes:

Semifinal round record
Pos	Team	W	L	Qualification
1	San Miguel Beermen	7	1	
2	Ginebra San Miguel	5	3	Qualify to Finals berth playoff (Note: San Miguel advanced to the Finals outright as #1 seeded team; Ginebra, aside from winning earning the semifinal bonus, also ended up tied for #2.)
3	Hills Bros. Coffee Kings	4	4	
4	Shell Azocord Super Bugbusters	2	6	
5	Great Taste Instant Milk	2	6	

=== Third place playoffs ===
Team 1	Series	Team 2	Game 1	Game 2	Game 3	Game 4	Game 5	Game 6	Game 7
(3) Ginebra San Miguel	4–0	(4) Shell Azocord Super Bugbusters	134–127	127–123	166–132	153–109	—	—	—

=== Finals ===
Team 1	Series	Team 2	Game 1	Game 2	Game 3	Game 4	Game 5	Game 6	Game 7
(1) San Miguel Beermen	4–1	(2) Hills Bros. Coffee Kings	97–110	123–100	114–92	113–105	96–86	—	—

- Best Import of the Conference: Bobby Parks (San Miguel)

== Awards ==
- Most Valuable Player: Abet Guidaben (San Miguel)
- Rookie of the Year: Allan Caidic (Great Taste)
- Most Improved Player: Elpidio Villamin (Hills Bros.)
- Best Import-Open Conference: David Thirdkill (Tanduay)
- Best Import-Reinforced Conference: Bobby Parks (San Miguel)
- Mythical Five:
  - Philip Cezar (Great Taste)
  - Hector Calma (San Miguel)
  - Abet Guidaben (San Miguel)
  - Elpidio Villamin (Hills Bros.)
  - Allan Caidic (Great Taste)
- Mythical Second Team:
  - Ricardo Brown (Great Taste)
  - Arnie Tuadles (Great Taste)
  - Ramon Fernandez (Tanduay)
  - Bernardo Carpio (Great Taste)
  - Ricky Relosa (Hills Bros.)
- All-Defensive Team:
  - Chito Loyzaga (Ginebra)
  - Philip Cezar (Great Taste)
  - Elpidio Villamin (Hills Bros.)
  - Ricky Relosa (Hills Bros.)
  - Biboy Ravanes (Shell)

== Cumulative standings ==
Pos	Team	Pld	W	L	PCT	Best finish
1	Magnolia Ice Cream Makers/San Miguel Beermen	66	43	23	.652	Champions
2	Great Taste Coffee Makers/Instant Milk	60	35	25	.583	Champions
3	Ginebra San Miguel	68	33	35	.485	Third place
4	Tanduay Rhum Makers	45	22	23	.489	Champions
5	Hills Bros. Coffee Kings	58	29	29	.500	Finalist
6	Formula Shell Spark Aiders/Shell Azocord Super Bugbusters	54	18	36	.333	Semifinalist
7	Philippine national team (G)	13	2	11	.154	Elimination round

(G) Guests

=== Elimination round ===
Pos	Team	Pld	W	L	PCT
1	Great Taste Coffee Makers/Instant Milk	30	19	11	.633
2	Magnplia Ice Cream Makers/San Miguel Beermen	30	19	11	.633
3	Ginebra San Miguel	30	15	15	.500
4	Hills Bros. Coffee Kings	30	15	15	.500
5	Formula Shell Spark Aiders/Shell Azocord Super Bugbusters	30	13	17	.433
6	Tanduay Rhum Makers	30	13	17	.433
7	Philippine national team (G)	12	2	10	.167

(G) Guests

=== Playoffs ===
Pos	Team	Pld	W	L
1	Magnplia Ice Cream Makers/San Miguel Beermen	36	24	12
2	Ginebra San Miguel	38	18	20
3	Great Taste Coffee Makers/Instant Milk	30	16	14
4	Hills Bros. Coffee Kings	28	14	14
5	Tanduay Rhum Makers	15	9	6
6	Formula Shell Spark Aiders/Shell Azocord Super Bugbusters	24	5	19
7	Philippine national team (G)	1	0	1

(G) Guests
