= 1987 San Miguel Beermen season =

- Head coach: Norman Black
- Owner: San Miguel Corporation

Open Conference results
- Record: 16–8 (66.7%)
- Place: 3rd
- Playoff finish: Semifinals

All-Filipino Conference results
- Record: 10–9 (52.6%)
- Place: 3rd
- Playoff finish: Semifinals

Reinforced Conference results
- Record: 17–6 (73.9%)
- Place: 1st
- Playoff finish: Champions (Def.Hills Bros, 4-1)

San Miguel Beermen seasons

The 1987 San Miguel Beermen season was the 13th season of the franchise in the Philippine Basketball Association (PBA). The team was known as Magnolia Ice Cream Makers in the first two conferences.

== Transactions ==
Players Added	Signed	Former team
Ricardo Cui	Off-season	Manila Beer (disbanded)
Abet Guidaben	Off-season	Manila Beer (disbanded)

== Awards ==
- Alberto Guidaben won his second Most Valuable Player (MVP) award.
- Bobby Parks was named Best Import of the Reinforced Conference.
- Hector Calma was voted SCOOP Most Outstanding player of the Reinforced Conference finals series.

== Notable dates ==
March 22: In the first game of the season, the Magnolia Ice Cream Makers welcomes the return of Norman Black as their coach and import by routing Hills Bros. (formerly Alaska), 124-88. The Coffee Kings were limited to just nine points in the second quarter and Magnolia had their biggest lead of 40 points in the last minute of the game.

March 29: Magnolia rolled to its third straight win and solo leadership in the Open Conference with a 108-91 romp over Ginebra San Miguel, which absorbed its first loss in two outings.

April 28: Magnolia weathered a desperate Tanduay rally to win, 109-101, and halted the Rhum Makers' six-game winning streak and stay in strong contention for an outright semifinals slot.

June 2: The Ice Cream Makers beat Ginebra San Miguel, 112-105, for their first win in three games in the semifinal round as they snapped the Ginebras' eight-game winning run.

June 7: Franz Pumaren drilled in two pressure charity shots with no time left to forge a second extension as Magnolia escaped with a 134-130 double-overtime win over Ginebra San Miguel and tied the Gins with two wins and three losses with one scheduled playing date left in the semifinal round of the Open Conference.

July 30: Abet Guidaben's last second follow up off a miss by Yves Dignadice saved Magnolia from a brink of elimination in the All-Filipino Conference as the Ice Cream Makers turn back Ginebra San Miguel, 94-93, and tied them in the standings with two wins and four losses.

October 4: Behind Bobby Parks and Samboy Lim, who is returning from an ankle injury, the San Miguel Beermen posted a 123-113 win over sister team Ginebra San Miguel in the second game at the start of the Reinforced Conference. Parks topscored for the Beermen with 39 points while Samboy Lim added 25 markers. The Ginebras were led by Billy Ray Bates with 44 points, followed by Chito Loyzaga with 25 points.

November 10: The Beermen kept its poise in the face of Ginebra's third quarter rally to win pulling away, 129-113. Bobby Parks banged in 63 points and outscored his counterpart Billy Ray Bates with 54 points. San Miguel won their first game in the semifinals and their 17th victory in 19 meetings with Ginebra in the season.

== Championship ==
The San Miguel Beermen went home with the Reinforced Conference title behind best import Bobby Parks, they defeated Hills Bros. Coffee Kings, four games to one. The Beermen won their third PBA crown and their first since 1982.

== Won–loss records vs opponents ==
Team	Win	Loss	1st (Open)	2nd (All-Filipino)	3rd (Reinforced)
Ginebra	17	3	8-1	6-1	3-1
Great Taste	4	8	0-4	1-3	3-1
Hills Bros	10	4	2-0	1-2	7-2
Shell	6	4	2-0	2-2	2-2
Tanduay	4	4	2-3	0-1	2-0
RP Team	2	0	2-0	N/A	N/A
Total	43	23	16-8	10-9	17-6

== Roster ==
1987 San Miguel Beermen roster
Players

Pos.	#	POB	Name	Height	Weight	DOB (YYYY–MM–DD)	From
F	4	(Philippines)	Elmer Reyes	6 ft 1 in (1.85 m)			San Beda
G	5	(Philippines)	Franz Pumaren	5 ft 9 in (1.75 m)			De La Salle
G	6	(Philippines)	Pido Jarencio	5 ft 10 in (1.78 m)			UST
G	7	(Philippines)	Alfie Almario	6 ft 0 in (1.83 m)			De La Salle
F	9	(Philippines)	Samboy Lim	6 ft 0 in (1.83 m)			Letran
F	10	(Philippines)	Alvin Teng	6 ft 4 in (1.93 m)			Arellano
C	11	(Philippines)	Tonichi Yturri	6 ft 5 in (1.96 m)			De La Salle
F	12	(Philippines)	Yves Dignadice	6 ft 4 in (1.93 m)			STI WNU
G	14	(Philippines)	Hector Calma	5 ft 9 in (1.75 m)			Adamson
F	15	(Philippines)	Ricardo Cui	6 ft 3 in (1.91 m)			Lyceum
F	17	(Philippines)	Jeffrey Graves	6 ft 3 in (1.91 m)			Angeles
C	32	(Philippines)	Abet Guidaben	6 ft 5 in (1.96 m)			USJ–R

Coaches

Head coach

- (United States) Norman Black

Assistant coach(es)

- (Philippines) Derrick Pumaren
- (Philippines) Pilo Pumaren

Team manager

- (Philippines) Sonny Valencia

Legend

- (C) Team captain
- Injured

=== Imports ===
Name	Conference	No.	Pos.	Ht.	College
Norman Black	Open Conference	24	Forward	6"5'	SJU
Dwayne Polee	1987 PBA/IBA World Challenge Cup	21	Forward	6"4'	Pepperdine
Bobby Parks	1987 PBA/IBA World Challenge Cup; Reinforced Conference	22	Guard-Forward	6"3'	MSU
