= 1987 PBA/IBA World Challenge Cup =

1987 PBA PBA/IBA Cup
- Duration: September 20–27, 1987
- TV partner(s): Vintage Sports (PTV)

Finals
- Champions: IBA Selection
- Runners-up: Great Taste Instant Milk

Awards
- Finals MVP: Ray Hall

PBA PBA/IBA Cup chronology
- 1988 >

PBA conference chronology
- < 1987 All-Filipino 1987 Reinforced >

The 1987 Coca-Cola PBA/IBA World Challenge Cup was the one-week special tournament put together by the Philippine Basketball Association (PBA) and the newly formed league in the United States for players standing 6'4" and below called International Basketball Association (IBA). The one-week event took place from September 20–27 and features PBA teams along with an IBA Selection in a four-team field.

== Tournament details ==
Sponsored by Coca-Cola Bottlers Inc., the first staging had the top three PBA teams in the All-Filipino Conference; Champion Great Taste Instant Milk (formerly Great Taste Coffee), Runner-up Hills Bros Coffee Kings and third placer San Miguel Beer (formerly Magnolia), qualified in the said tournament, together with the IBA All-Stars, coach by Ted Owens, noteworthy of that selection includes future PBA imports "Sugar" Ray Hall and Sean Chambers, Russell Brown, a backcourt star from Arizona State University, and Sam Smith. PBA teams were allowed two imports each, from Great Taste Instant Milk; Dexter Shouse, on loan to Shell, and Dwight Moody, San Miguel Beer; Bobby Parks and Dwayne Polee, and Hills Bros. Coffee Kings; Alexander Adams and McKinley Singleton.

== Results ==
Vintage

September 20

San Miguel Beermen 128, Hills Bros Coffee Kings 73

The ULTRA, Pasig

Vintage

September 20

boxscores

IBA All-Stars 139, Great Taste Milkmasters 135

The ULTRA, Pasig

Vintage

September 22

boxscores

Great Taste Milkmasters 114, San Miguel Beermen 106

The ULTRA, Pasig

Vintage

September 22

IBA All-Stars 141, Hills Bros Coffee Kings 117

The ULTRA, Pasig

Vintage

September 24

Great Taste Milkmasters 122, Hills Bros Coffee Kings 110

The ULTRA, Pasig

Vintage

September 24

San Miguel Beermen 118, IBA All-Stars 114

The ULTRA, Pasig

Note: Great Taste, San Miguel and the IBA Selection finished with identical 2-1 won-loss slates, despite the Beermen's 55-point winning margin over Hills Bros, the quotient system says San Miguel has to win over the IBA stars by at least 8 points. Great Taste and IBA All-Stars played in a one-game finale.

== Battle for third place ==
Vintage

September 27

San Miguel Beermen 102, Hills Bros Coffee Kings 100
Scoring by quarter: 28-22, 28-22, 32-23, 14-33
Pts: Bobby Parks 32	Pts: Alex Adams 44

The ULTRA, Pasig

== Finals ==
Vintage

September 27

IBA All-Stars 130, Great Taste Milkmasters 112
Scoring by quarter: 26-41, 34-20, 33-34, 37-17

The ULTRA, Pasig

Ray Hall of the IBA Selection was named the Most Valuable Player of the PBA/IBA Challenge Cup.

== Slam Dunk contest ==
A sideshow event in the PBA/IBA series was the Kiwi Sneaker Champoo Slam Dunk Competition. In the final round, Sean Chambers of the IBA All-Stars, romped off with the P 50,000 top pot, outjumping the legendary Billy Ray Bates of Ginebra San Miguel, 28-25, who missed his last dunk, a two-handed reverse slam, placing third on the three judges scores was Bobby Parks of San Miguel Beer.
