= 1987 PBA Open Conference =

- Duration: March 22 – June 23, 1987
- TV partner(s): Vintage Sports (PTV)

Finals
- Champions: Tanduay Rhum Makers
- Runners-up: Great Taste Coffee Makers

Awards
- Best Import: David Thirdkill (Tanduay Rhum Makers)

PBA Open Conference chronology
- < 1986 1988 >

PBA conference chronology
- < 1986 Open 1987 All-Filipino >

The 1987 Philippine Basketball Association (PBA) Open Conference was the first conference of the 1987 PBA season. It started on March 22 and ended on June 23, 1987. The tournament is an import-laden format, which requires an import or a pure-foreign player for each team.

== Format ==
The following format will be observed for the duration of the conference:

- Double-round robin eliminations; 12 games per team; Teams are then seeded by basis on win–loss records.
- #1 and #2 teams automatically advance to the semifinals.
- Teams seeded #3, #4, #5 and #6 will dispute in the last two semifinals berth in a one round-robin quarterfinals (results from the eliminations will be carried over).
- Semifinals will be two round robin affairs
- The top two teams in the semifinals advance to the best of seven finals. The last two teams dispute the third-place trophy in a best of seven playoff.

== Elimination round ==
Pos	Team	W	L	PCT	GB	Qualification
1	Great Taste Coffee Makers	10	2	.833	—	Advance to semifinal round
2	Magnolia Ice Cream Makers	9	3	.750 (Note: Semifinal berth playoff: Magnolia 108–98 Tanduay)	1	Advance to semifinal round
3	Tanduay Rhum Makers	9	3	.750	1	Proceed to quarterfinal round
4	Ginebra San Miguel	6	6	.500	4	Proceed to quarterfinal round
5	Hills Bros. Coffee Kings	4	8	.333	6	Proceed to quarterfinal round
6	Formula Shell Spark Aiders	2	10	.167 (Note: Quarterfinal berth playoff: Shell 120–111 Philippine team)	8	Proceed to quarterfinal round
7	Philippine national team (G)	2	10	.167	8	

(G) Guests

== Quarterfinal round ==
Pos	Team	W	L	PCT	GB	Qualification
3	Tanduay Rhum Makers	10	5	.667	—	Semifinal round
4	Ginebra San Miguel	9	6	.600	1	Semifinal round
5	Hills Bros. Coffee Kings	5	10	.333	5	
6	Formula Shell Spark Aiders	3	12	.200	7	

== Semifinal round ==
Pos	Team	W	L	PCT	GB	Qualification
1	Great Taste Coffee Makers	4	2	.667 (Note: Head-to-head record: Great Taste 1–1 Tanduay, Great Taste +2)	—	Advance to the Finals
2	Tanduay Rhum Makers	4	2	.667	—	Advance to the Finals
3	Magnolia Ice Cream Makers	2	4	.333 (Note: Head-to-head record: Magnolia 2–0 Ginebra)	2	Proceed to third place playoffs
4	Ginebra San Miguel	2	4	.333	2	Proceed to third place playoffs

=== Results ===
Teams	GIN	GTC	MAG	TAN
Ginebra San Miguel	—	119–118	105–112	110–102
Great Taste Coffee Makers	154–127	—	112–106	124–136
Magnolia Ice Cream Makers	134–130**	107–114	—	91–101
Tanduay Rhum Makers	122–104	119–131	106–100	—

Legend: Blue = left column team win; Red = top row team win.
Matches with lighter background shading were decided after overtime.

== Third place playoffs ==
Vintage

June 14

Magnolia Ice Cream Makers 103, Ginebra San Miguel 96
Scoring by quarter: 26-21, 23–25, 30-24, 24–26
Pts: Norman Black 46	Pts: Michael Hackett 38

The ULTRA, Pasig

Vintage

June 16

Magnolia Ice Cream Makers 91, Ginebra San Miguel 97
Scoring by quarter: 21–25, 20-14, 34-22, 16–36
Pts: Norman Black 33	Pts: Michael Hackett 43

The ULTRA, Pasig

Vintage

June 18

Magnolia Ice Cream Makers 105, Ginebra San Miguel 76
Scoring by quarter: 28-16, 23-19, 22-22, 32-19
Pts: Norman Black 46	Pts: Michael Hackett 23

The ULTRA, Pasig

Vintage

June 21

Magnolia Ice Cream Makers 98, Ginebra San Miguel 91
Scoring by quarter: 31-25, 23–24, 19-18, 25-24
Pts: Norman Black 33	Pts: Michael Hackett 48

The ULTRA, Pasig

Vintage

June 23

Magnolia Ice Cream Makers 106, Ginebra San Miguel 101
Scoring by quarter: 27-16, 19–24, 33-26, 27–35
Pts: Norman Black 39	Pts: Joey Loyzaga 24
Magnolia wins series, 4–1

The ULTRA, Pasig

== Finals ==
Vintage

June 14

Great Taste Coffee Makers 114, Tanduay Rhum Makers 118

The ULTRA, Pasig

Vintage

June 16

Great Taste Coffee Makers 134, Tanduay Rhum Makers 135 (OT)

The ULTRA, Pasig

Vintage

June 18

Great Taste Coffee Makers 120, Tanduay Rhum Makers 114

The ULTRA, Pasig

Vintage

June 21

Great Taste Coffee Makers 112, Tanduay Rhum Makers 113

The ULTRA, Pasig

Vintage

June 23

Great Taste Coffee Makers 120, Tanduay Rhum Makers 134
Tanduay wins series, 4–1

The ULTRA, Pasig
