= PBA Open Conference =

Philippine basketball tournament

The PBA Open Conference was a tournament held during a Philippine Basketball Association season from 1977-1983 and 1985-1989.

== History ==
While PBA annuals states in the league's first two seasons in 1975-1976 referred to the second conference as "Open Conference", it has since been reclassified. The PBA Open Conference started in the second offing of the 1977 season through 1979. In 1980-1981, the Open Conference became the PBA's first tournament of the season and in 1985, 1987-1989. Three times in 1982-1983 and 1986, the Open Conference was the season-ending tournament. The only time it was not held was in 1984 where the league had two All-Filipino Conferences.

The PBA Open Conferences from 1978-1987 had four semifinalists in a double-round robin, back-to-zero standings to determined the two finalist. The previous year had the first-ever, six-team semifinal cast where Crispa and U/tex played in the finals which the Redmanizers took in the deciding fifth game to win their six straight PBA title. The last two Open Conferences from 1988-1989 had five teams entering the semifinal round. The First Conferences from 1990-1992 may still be considered "Open" as well as the Third Conference being called "Reinforced" but like in the first two years of the league in the 1970s, the word "Open" was rarely written in newspaper articles.

=== Trivias / Teams' first championships ===
The U/tex Wranglers in 1978, Royal Tru-Orangemen (former team name of San Miguel Beermen) in 1979 and Ginebra San Miguel in 1986 have all won their first PBA championship in the Open tournament.

In 1978, U/tex won their first five semifinal assignments to clinch the first finals seat and lost their last game to Crispa, denying the Toyota Tamaraws of a chance to tie Crispa and forge a playoff for the second finals berth. It was a similar case the following year when Royal Tru-Orange won their first five games in the semifinals and it was Toyota's turn to beat the Orangemen in their last outing and nailed the second finals seat and avoid a possible playoff with Crispa.

Two of the best final four semifinals took place when the Open Conference was the last conference of the season in 1982-1983. Only one point separates a possible four-way deadlock when Gilbey's Gin beat San Miguel to booked their first finals appearance in 1982. The following year, it happened as all four teams ended up with three wins and three losses each, thus resulting to the first-ever, double-playoff match. Incidentally, three of the four semifinalist in the Open Conferences from 1982 and 1983 were Great Taste (N-Rich in 1982), Gilbey's Gin and San Miguel Beer. The two traditional powerhouses that won the Open title, Toyota Super Corollas in 1982 with Crispa having their worst finish in that conference, and in 1983, Crispa won the Grandslam while Toyota have their worst finish too in their final conference.

=== Open Conference Imports ===
Two imports were allowed from 1977 to 1983 and again in 1986. While only one import per team in 1985, 1987-1989. In the 1982 Open Conference, six of the eight American reinforcements playing in the semifinals were returning imports. The Toyota-Gilbey's finale were the only time that four returning imports (Andrew Fields, Donnie Ray Koonce, Lew Massey and Larry McNeill) were playing in the PBA championship. The 1983 Open Conference semifinals had five returnees (Billy Ray Bates, Norman Black, Lew Massey, Donnie Ray Koonce and Rich Adams) among the eight imports.

== Memorable Open finals ==
1980: The last 16 seconds of Game five of the U-Tex vs Toyota championship series.

1981: The last Toyota vs Crispa finale

1985: The first PBA finals in the league's new home, the ULTRA in Pasig. The Great Taste Coffee Makers' only best-of-seven playoffs victory in the Ricardo Brown era.

1986: Ginebra San Miguel's first PBA championship after 7 seasons. Sonny Jaworski becoming the first playing-coach to steered his team to a PBA crown.

1988: The Purefoods Hotdogs' near-cinderella finish by playing in the finals against San Miguel Beermen in their maiden conference and only the second time a best-of-seven title series went into a deciding seventh game.

== See also ==
- Philippine Basketball Association Champions
