= Jeff Taylor (basketball) =

American basketball player (1960–2020)

Personal information
- Born: January 1, 1960 Blytheville, Arkansas, U.S.
- Died: March 2020 (aged 60) Sweden
- Listed height: 6 ft 4 in (1.93 m)
- Listed weight: 175 lb (79 kg)

Career information
- High school: Hobbs (Hobbs, New Mexico)
- College: Texas Tech (1978–1982)
- NBA draft: 1982: 2nd round, 42nd overall pick
- Drafted by: Houston Rockets
- Position: Point guard / shooting guard
- Number: 13, 35

Career history
- 1982–1983: Houston Rockets
- 1986–1987: Detroit Pistons
- Stats at NBA.com
- Stats at Basketball Reference

Jeffrey Taylor (January 1, 1960 – March 2020) was an American professional basketball player. He played for three years at Texas Tech University, before being drafted by the Houston Rockets in the 1982 NBA draft. Taylor played one season with the Rockets in the 1982-83 NBA season, and another with the Detroit Pistons in the 1986-87 NBA season.

After his NBA career ended, he continued playing in Europe, eventually settling in Sweden, in 1998 he led the Norrköping Dolphins to a Swedish championship. His son, Jeffery played college basketball at Vanderbilt, and was selected in the 2012 NBA draft by the Charlotte Bobcats.

Taylor's death was announced by Texas Tech on March 5, 2020. No exact death date was given. He was 60 years old.

== Career statistics ==
Legend
GP	Games played	GS	Games started	MPG	Minutes per game
FG%	Field goal percentage	3P%	3-point field goal percentage	FT%	Free throw percentage
RPG	Rebounds per game	APG	Assists per game	SPG	Steals per game
BPG	Blocks per game	PPG	Points per game	**Bold**	Career high

=== NBA ===
==== Regular season ====
Year	Team	GP	GS	MPG	FG%	3P%	FT%	RPG	APG	SPG	BPG	PPG
1982–83	Houston	**44**	**5**	**17.6**	.400	.000	.652	**1.8**	**2.5**	**.9**	**.3**	**3.6**
1986–87	Detroit	12	0	3.7	**.600**	–	**.900**	.3	.3	.2	.1	1.8
Career		56	5	14.6	.412	.000	.696	1.5	2.0	.8	.3	3.2
