= David Thirdkill =

American basketball player (born 1960)

Personal information
- Born: April 12, 1960 (age 66) St. Louis, Missouri, U.S.
- Listed height: 6 ft 7 in (2.01 m)
- Listed weight: 196 lb (89 kg)

Career information
- High school: Soldan (St. Louis, Missouri)
- College: College of Southern Idaho (1978–1979); Bradley (1979–1982)
- NBA draft: 1982: 1st round, 15th overall pick
- Drafted by: Phoenix Suns
- Playing career: 1982–1996
- Position: Small forward / shooting guard
- Number: 40, 22, 21, 45

Career history
- 1982–1983: Phoenix Suns
- 1983–1984: Detroit Pistons
- 1985: Milwaukee Bucks
- 1985: San Antonio Spurs
- 1985–1986: Boston Celtics
- 1986–1987: Tanduay Rhum Masters
- 1988: Purefoods TJ Hotdogs
- 1987–1988: Rochester Flyers
- 1989: Virtus Roma
- 1989–1990: Chorale Roanne Basket
- 1991–1994: Hapoel Tel Aviv
- 1994–1995: Hapoel Holon
- 1995–1996: Bnei Herzelia

Career highlights
- CBA All-Star (1988); NBA champion (1986); Israeli Basketball Premier League MVP (1993); Israeli Cup Champion (1993); PBA Champion (1987 Open); PBA Best Import of the Conference (1987 Open); 2× Second-team All-MVC (1981, 1982)
- Stats at NBA.com
- Stats at Basketball Reference

David Thirdkill (born April 12, 1960) is an American former professional basketball player. He played in the NBA, and was the 1993 Israeli Basketball Premier League MVP.

== NBA career ==
He was selected by the Phoenix Suns in the first round (15th overall) of the 1982 NBA draft. A 6 ft 7 in (2.01 m) small forward from the College of Southern Idaho and Bradley University, Thirdkill played in five NBA seasons from 1982 to 1987.

Born in St. Louis, Missouri and nicknamed "The Sheriff", he played for the Suns, Detroit Pistons, Milwaukee Bucks, San Antonio Spurs and Boston Celtics. On January 24, 1986, he scored a career-high 20 points and grabbed a career-high 8 rebounds in a 135–114 win over the Golden State Warriors. He earned a championship ring with the 1985–86 Celtics.

In his NBA career, Thirdkill played in 179 games and scored a total of 510 points. Thirdkill made one 3 point shot as a rookie with Phoenix, then never made another three pointer. He finished his career one for 11 from three point land.

== NBA career statistics ==
Legend
GP	Games played	GS	Games started	MPG	Minutes per game
FG%	Field goal percentage	3P%	3-point field goal percentage	FT%	Free throw percentage
RPG	Rebounds per game	APG	Assists per game	SPG	Steals per game
BPG	Blocks per game	PPG	Points per game	**Bold**	Career high
†	Won an NBA championship

=== Regular season ===
Year	Team	GP	GS	MPG	FG%	3P%	FT%	RPG	APG	SPG	BPG	PPG
1982–83	Phoenix	**49**	**2**	10.6	.435	**.143**	.577	1.5	0.7	0.4	0.1	4.0
1983–84	Detroit	46	0	6.3	.431	.000	.484	0.7	0.6	0.2	0.1	1.7
1984–85	Detroit	10	1	11.5	.522	.000	.455	0.8	0.1	0.3	0.2	2.9
1984–85	Milwaukee	6	0	2.7	**.750**	.000	.500	0.3	0.0	0.0	0.0	1.2
1984–85	San Antonio	2	**2**	**26.0**	.455	.000	**.833**	**3.5**	**1.5**	**1.0**	**0.5**	**7.5**
1985–86†	Boston	**49**	0	7.9	.491	.000	.625	1.4	0.3	0.2	0.1	3.3
1986–87	Boston	17	0	5.2	.417	.000	.313	1.1	0.1	0.1	0.0	1.5
Career		179	5	8.2	.457	.091	.565	1.2	0.5	0.3	0.1	2.8

=== Playoffs ===
Year	Team	GP	GS	MPG	FG%	3P%	FT%	RPG	APG	SPG	BPG	PPG
1984–85	San Antonio	5	0	**4.4**	.250	.000	**.500**	0.4	**0.4**	0.0	0.0	0.8
1985–86†	Boston	**13**	0	3.6	**.333**	.000	.455	**0.6**	0.2	**0.2**	0.0	**1.3**
Career		18	0	3.8	.318	.000	.467	0.6	0.3	0.1	0.0	1.2

== International career ==
In 1987, Thirdkill played in a tournament (Open Conference) for the Tanduay Rhum Masters team in the Philippine Basketball Association and won the championship aside from being named "Best Import" of the conference. He returned for another conference in 1988, this time for the newly formed Purefoods team, which he led to another finals appearance. Thereafter, he played in Italy for Virtus Roma, in France for Chorale Roanne Basket and Saint-Quentin Basket-Ball.

He then played most notably in Israel for a spell of five years, mainly for Hapoel Tel Aviv, finally retiring in 1996. He was the 1993 Israeli Basketball Premier League MVP.
