= 1987 PBA draft =

Player selection in Philippine basketball

General information
- Date: February 16, 1987

Overview
- League: Philippine Basketball Association
- First selection: Allan Caidic (Great Taste)

The 1987 Philippine Basketball Association (PBA) rookie draft was an event in which teams drafted players from the amateur ranks. The draft was held on February 16, 1987.

== Round 1 ==
Pick	Player	Country of origin*	PBA team	College
1	Allan Caidic	Philippines	Great Taste Coffee Makers (from Formula Shell)	East
2	Al Solis	Philippines	Hills Bros. Coffee Kings	Visayas
3	Harmon Codiñera	Philippines	Ginebra San Miguel	Far Eastern
4	Cayetano Salazar	Philippines	Tanduay Rhum Makers	Letran

== Round 2 ==
Pick	Player	Country of origin*	PBA team	College
	Anthony Mendoza	Philippines	Ginebra San Miguel	Visayas

== Notes ==
- Shell traded their first round pick, along with Bernie Fabiosa and Philip Cezar, to Great Taste in exchange for Manny Victorino and Jimmy Manansala a week before the draft.
- Magnolia and Shell waived their rights to the amateur pool.

== Undrafted players ==
- Dennis Carbonilla
- Benjie Gutierrez
- Guillermo Valerio
