= 1987 PBA Reinforced Conference =

Basketball in Philippines

- Duration: October 4 – December 13, 1987
- TV partner(s): Vintage Sports (PTV)

Finals
- Champions: San Miguel Beermen
- Runners-up: Hills Bros. Coffee Kings

Awards
- Best Import: Bobby Parks (San Miguel Beermen)

PBA Reinforced Conference chronology
- < 1986 1988 >

PBA conference chronology
- < 1987 PBA/IBA 1988 Open >

The 1987 Philippine Basketball Association (PBA) Reinforced Conference was the third and last conference of the 1987 PBA season. It started on October 4 and ended on December 13, 1987. The tournament is an import-laden format, which requires an import or a pure-foreign player for each team with a 6'4" height limit.

== Format ==
The following format will be observed for the duration of the conference:

- Double-round robin eliminations; 10 games per team; Teams are then seeded by basis on win–loss records.
- Team with the worst record after the elimination round will be eliminated.
- Semifinals will be two round robin affairs with the five remaining teams. Results from the elimination round will be carried over.
- The top two teams in the semifinals advance to the best of seven finals. The last two teams dispute the third-place trophy in a best-of-seven playoff.

== Elimination round ==
| Pos | Team | W | L | PCT | GB | Qualification |
|---|---|---|---|---|---|---|
| 1 | Shell Azocord Super Bugbusters | 7 | 3 | .700 | — | Semifinal round |
| 2 | San Miguel Beermen | 6 | 4 | .600 | 1 | Semifinal round |
| 3 | Hills Bros. Coffee Kings | 6 | 4 | .600 | 1 | Semifinal round |
| 4 | Ginebra San Miguel | 5 | 5 | .500 | 2 | Semifinal round |
| 5 | Great Taste Instant Milk | 4 | 6 | .400 | 3 | Semifinal round |
| 6 | Tanduay Rhum Makers | 2 | 8 | .200 | 5 | |

== Semifinal round ==
Overall record
| Pos | Team | W | L | PCT | GB | Qualification |
|---|---|---|---|---|---|---|
| 1 | San Miguel Beermen | 13 | 5 | .722 | — | Advance to the Finals (Note: If a team outside the top two teams wins at least five semifinal round games, then it and the second-placed team will playoff for the last Finals berth; otherwise, the top 2 teams qualify outright.) |
| 2 | Hills Bros. Coffee Kings | 10 | 8 | .556 (Note: Second seed playoff: Hills Bros. 89–87 Ginebra) | 3 | Guaranteed Finals berth playoff |
| 3 | Ginebra San Miguel | 10 | 8 | .556 | 3 | Qualify to Finals berth playoff |
| 4 | Shell Azocord Super Bugbusters | 9 | 9 | .500 | 4 | Proceed to third place playoffs |
| 5 | Great Taste Instant Milk | 6 | 12 | .333 | 7 | |

Notes:

Semifinal round record
| Pos | Team | W | L | Qualification |
|---|---|---|---|---|
| 1 | San Miguel Beermen | 7 | 1 | |
| 2 | Ginebra San Miguel | 5 | 3 | Qualify to Finals berth playoff (Note: San Miguel advanced to the Finals outright as #1 seeded team; Ginebra, aside from winning earning the semifinal bonus, also ended up tied for #2.) |
| 3 | Hills Bros. Coffee Kings | 4 | 4 | |
| 4 | Shell Azocord Super Bugbusters | 2 | 6 | |
| 5 | Great Taste Instant Milk | 2 | 6 | |

== Second seed playoff ==
Vintage

December 1

Hills Bros. Coffee Kings 89, Ginebra San Miguel 87

The ULTRA, Pasig

== Third place playoffs ==
Vintage

December 3

Ginebra San Miguel 134, Shell Azocord Super Bugbusters 127

The ULTRA, Pasig

Vintage

December 6

Ginebra San Miguel 127, Shell Azocord Super Bugbusters 123

The ULTRA, Pasig

Vintage

December 8

Ginebra San Miguel 166, Shell Azocord Super Bugbusters 132

The ULTRA, Pasig

Vintage

December 10

Ginebra San Miguel 153, Shell Azocord Super Bugbusters 109
Ginebra wins series, 4–0

The ULTRA, Pasig

== Finals ==
Vintage

December 3

San Miguel Beermen 97, Hills Bros. Coffee Kings 110

The ULTRA, Pasig

Vintage

December 6

San Miguel Beermen 123, Hills Bros. Coffee Kings 100

The ULTRA, Pasig

Vintage

December 8

San Miguel Beermen 114, Hills Bros. Coffee Kings 92

The ULTRA, Pasig

Vintage

December 10

San Miguel Beermen 113, Hills Bros. Coffee Kings 105

The ULTRA, Pasig

Vintage

December 13

San Miguel Beermen 96, Hills Bros. Coffee Kings 86
San Miguel wins series, 4–1

The ULTRA, Pasig
