= Alejo Alolor =

Filipino basketball player

Personal information
- Born: 28 March 1958 (age 68)
- Listed height: 6 ft 1 in (1.85 m)
- Listed weight: 160 lb (73 kg)

Career information
- College: Southwestern University
- Playing career: 1981–1993
- Position: Forward / Guard

Career history
- 1981–1982: Finance Funders
- 1983–1985: Great Taste Coffeemakers
- 1986–1988: Alaska Air Force
- 1989–1990: Purefoods Hotdogs
- 1991–1992: 7-Up Uncolas
- 1993: Ginebra San Miguel

Alejo "Ponky" Alolor (born 28 March 1958) is a Filipino former professional basketball player. He played 12 seasons in the Philippine Basketball Association (PBA), representing various franchises as a guard and forward.

== Career ==
Alolor played collegiate basketball for Southwestern University in Cebu before entering the professional ranks.

He made his professional debut in the PBA in 1981, signing as a rookie with the Finance Funders franchise. After two seasons with the Funders, he was acquired by the Great Taste Coffeemakers under manager Ignacio Gotao, playing for the team from 1983 to 1985 and appearing in multiple championship series.

In 1986, Alolor joined the newly formed Alaska Air Force franchise. He continued his career with stints at Purefoods Hotdogs starting in 1989, and later played for 7-Up Uncolas and Ginebra San Miguel before retiring from professional basketball in 1993.
