= Bernardo Carpio (basketball) =

Filipino basketball player

Personal information
- Born: May 7, 1958 (age 68)
- Listed height: 6 ft 4 in (1.93 m)
- Listed weight: 188 lb (85 kg)

Career information
- High school: UST (Manila)
- College: Ateneo
- Playing career: 1980–1992
- Position: Power forward / center
- Number: 29

Career history
- 1980–1982: Crispa Redmanizers
- 1983–1990: Great Taste Coffee Makers/Presto Tivolis
- 1991–1992: Pepsi/7-Up Uncolas
Medals
Men's basketball
Representing Philippines
SEA Games
Gold medal – first place	1977 Kuala Lumpur	Team
Silver medal – second place	1979 Jakarta	Team

Jose Bernardo "Joy" Carpio (born May 7, 1958) is a retired Filipino professional basketball player who played in the Philippine Basketball Association (PBA).

== High school and college career ==
Carpio teamed up with Fritz Gaston, Steve Watson, future pro teammate Padim Israel and Chito Narvasa as a 6’4” center-forward for the Ateneo Blue Eagles from 1974 to 1977, winning back-to-back NCAA titles in 1975 and 1976. He also earned Most Valuable Player honors in 1977.

== Professional career ==
Carpio joined the Crispa Redmanizers and learned from the team's resident stars like Atoy Co, Freddie Hubalde, Abet Guidaben and Philip Cezar. He was a reliable off-the-bench player as Crispa constantly battled Toyota for PBA trophies. In 1983, he would join a powerhouse offensive team in Great Taste, which boasted of a very promising center in Manny Victorino, 3-time MVP Bogs Adornado (acquired from the disbanded U/tex team) and sensational Fil-Am rookie Ricardo Brown. Carpio faced his former team in two straight championship series (the Reinforced and the Open), losing both to the Grand Slam-winning Redmanizers. Great Taste, however, exacted sweet revenge against Crispa in the Third Conference of the following year, en route to three straight titles extending all the way to the 1985 season. While playing for the Coffee Makers, he earned the moniker "The Scavenger" from commentator Pinggoy Pengson for his penchant for collaring offensive rebounds and following up on missed shots as well as recovering loose balls. After spending the tailend of his career with Seven-Up, he was forced to end his playing days after nagging knee injuries could no longer be repaired. He spent 13 seasons in the PBA.

== Life after basketball ==
Carpio currently works as a public relations officer in the Commission on Elections.
