= Great Taste Coffee Makers =

- Founded: 1975
- Dissolved: Sold in 1993
- History: Presto Ice Cream (1975, 1977, 1988–1989, 1992); N-Rich Coffee Creamers (1976, 1982); Presto Fun Drinks (1980–1981); Great Taste Discoverers (1978–1980, 1983); Great Taste Coffee Makers (1982, 1983–1987); Great Taste Instant Milk (1987–1988); Presto Tivolis (1989–1991); Tivoli Milk Masters (1991)
- Team colors: Great Taste Coffee Great Taste Milk Presto Fun Drinks Presto Ice Cream Presto Tivoli
- Main sponsor: CFC Corporation (now merged with Universal Robina Corporation)
- Head coach: Felicisimo Fajardo; Tony Genato; Nilo Verona; Alfonso Marquez; Baby Dalupan; Jimmy Mariano; Tommy Manotoc
- Ownership: John Gokongwei
- Championships: 6 championships 1984 Second All-Filipino; 1984 Invitational; 1985 Open; 1985 All-Filipino; 1987 All-Filipino; 1990 All-Filipino 10 finals appearances
Dark uniform

The Great Taste Coffee Makers were a basketball team that played in the Philippine Basketball Association (PBA) from 1975 to 1992. It was one of the founding members of the PBA, Asia's first and oldest professional league. The franchise was owned by CFC Corporation (now merged with Universal Robina Corporation) and named after its brand of instant coffee, Great Taste Coffee. The franchise also played under other CFC brands such as N-Rich, Presto and Tivoli.

The franchise won six PBA championships, mostly under coach Baby Dalupan.

In 1993, CFC sold its PBA franchise to Sta. Lucia Realty & Development, Inc., which absorbed several Presto players.

== History ==
=== Early years (1975–1978) ===
Great Taste became a dominant team in the early 1980s. Started in the MICAA under coach Narciso Bernardo in 1973, notable players who wore the Presto/Great Taste jersey in the 1970s included the Aldanese brothers Noli and Jing (who replaced Fely Fajardo as coach in the second conference of 1976), Manny Paner, Florendo Ritualo (the father of Ren-Ren), Danny Pribhdas (the father of Danilo, Jr of the UST Growling Tigers), and Johnny Revilla. Coaches included Tony Genato (Quinito Henson's father-in-law), Chino Marquinez (who also served as team manager), and Nilo Verona.

=== Breakthrough (1979–1982) ===
In the second conference of 1979, the team reached the final four behind imports Jim Hearns and Darryl Smith. The following year, with the acquisition of Jun Papa and Estoy Estrada, the team again reached the semifinals of the Open Conference. In mid-season 1981, they signed center-forwards Manny Victorino and Joel Banal. That same year, the team had its first individual award winner in Rafael "Cho" Sison, voted the 1981 Rookie of the Year. In the final conference of both the 1981 and 1982 seasons, the team reached a playoff for a finals berth but fell short each time.

=== The Ricardo Brown era (1983–1987) ===
The team signed Filipino-American rookie Ricardo Brown in 1983, following negotiations involving Great Taste manager Ignacio Gotao and Crispa owner Danny Floro. Brown joined the Coffeemakers alongside Bogs Adornado from the disbanded U-Tex Wranglers, Manny Victorino, Joel Banal, Alejo Alolor, Joy Carpio, and import Norman Black. Great Taste reached the finals of the second conference that season, losing to the Billy Ray Bates-led Crispa.

Prior to the third conference, Coach Baby Dalupan joined the team, initially as a team consultant under Jimmy Mariano. Dalupan subsequently took over as head coach after Mariano was dismissed following a public comment, "we didn't intend to win," made after a loss to Galerie Dominique.

The team improved significantly the following year, acquiring players such as Arnie Tuadles, Frankie Lim, and Chito Loyzaga, and in 1985, signing Abe King and Willie Pearson. Great Taste won four straight championships between 1984 and 1985, combining a strong local lineup with imports Joe Binion and Jeff Collins.

=== The Allan Caidic era (1987–1992) ===
After failing to win a championship in 1986, the team traded two of its key players, Manny Victorino and Jimmy Manansala, to Shell for Philip Cezar and Bernie Fabiosa. With Atoy Co joining the team following the disbandment of the Manila Beer franchise, the three former Crispa players were reunited at Great Taste under their former coach, Baby Dalupan.

The team also drafted rookie Allan Caidic, and became one of the league's strongest teams that year. Great Taste regained the All-Filipino crown and won their fifth championship. The following season, franchise player Ricardo Brown left the team and signed with San Miguel Beer.

Presto won its final championship in 1990, featuring veteran Allan Caidic (named Most Valuable Player of the Year) and rookies Gerald Esplana (named Rookie of the Year) and Apet Jao (the top draft pick). The team added players including Bong Hawkins in 1991 and Vergel Meneses in 1992, before disbanding at the end of the 1992 season, when Sta. Lucia bought the franchise rights, including the rights to the first pick of the 1993 draft.

== Season-by-season records ==
Legend
Champion

Runner-up

Third place

Season	Conference	Team name	Overall record			Finals
Season	Conference	Team name	W	L	%	Finals
1975	First Conference	Presto Ice Cream Makers	6	18	.250	
1975	Second Conference	Presto Ice Cream Makers	6	18	.250	
1975	All-Philippine	Presto Ice Cream Makers	6	18	.250	
1976	First Conference	N-Rich	3	29	.094	
1976	Second Conference	N-Rich	3	29	.094	
1976	All-Philippine	N-Rich	3	29	.094	
1977	All-Filipino Conference	Presto Ice Cream Makers	15	30	.333	
1977	Open Conference	Presto Ice Cream Makers	15	30	.333	
1977	Invitational Conference	Presto Ice Cream Makers	15	30	.333	
1978	All-Filipino Conference	Great Taste Coffee Makers	5	23	.179	
1978	Open Conference	Great Taste Coffee Makers	5	23	.179	
1978	Invitational Conference	Great Taste Coffee Makers	5	23	.179	
1979	All-Filipino Conference	Great Taste Coffee Makers	21	26	.447	
1979	Open Conference	Great Taste Coffee Makers	21	26	.447	
1979	Invitational Conference	Great Taste Coffee Makers	21	26	.447	
1980	Open Conference	Great Taste Coffee Makers	14	25	.359	
1980	Invitational Conference	Great Taste Coffee Makers	14	25	.359	
1980	All-Filipino Conference	Great Taste Coffee Makers	14	25	.359	
1981	Open Conference	Presto Ice Cream Makers	17	26	.395	
1981	Reinforced Filipino	Presto Ice Cream Makers	17	26	.395	
1982	Reinforced Filipino	Great Taste Coffee Makers	19	27	.413	
1982	Invitational Conference	Great Taste Coffee Makers	19	27	.413	
1982	Open Conference	N-Rich	19	27	.413	
1983	All-Filipino Conference	Great Taste Coffee Makers	38	25	.603	
1983	Reinforced Filipino	Great Taste Coffee Makers	38	25	.603	Crispa 3, Great Taste 2
1983	Open Conference	Great Taste Coffee Makers	38	25	.603	Crispa 3, Great Taste 0
1984	First All-Filipino Conference	Great Taste Coffee Makers	39	14	.736	
1984	Second All-Filipino Conference	Great Taste Coffee Makers	39	14	.736	Great Taste 3, Beer Hausen 0
1984	Invitational Conference	Great Taste Coffee Makers	39	14	.736	Great Taste 3, Crispa 2
1985	Open Conference	Great Taste Coffee Makers	44	27	.620	Great Taste 4, Magnolia 2
1985	All-Filipino Conference	Great Taste Coffee Makers	44	27	.620	Great Taste 3, Shell 1
1985	Reinforced Conference	Great Taste Coffee Makers	44	27	.620	
1986	Reinforced Conference	Great Taste Coffee Makers	36	28	.563	Tanduay 4, Great Taste 2
1986	All-Filipino Conference	Great Taste Coffee Makers	36	28	.563	
1986	Open Conference	Great Taste Coffee Makers	36	28	.563	
1987	Open Conference	Great Taste Coffee Makers	35	25	.583	Tanduay 4, Great Taste 1
1987	All-Filipino Conference	Great Taste Coffee Makers	35	25	.583	Great Taste 3, Hills Bros. 0
1987	Reinforced Conference	Great Taste Coffee Makers	35	25	.583	
1988	Open Conference	Great Taste Coffee Makers	26	34	.433	
1988	All-Filipino Conference	Presto Ice Cream Makers	26	34	.433	
1988	Third Conference	Presto Ice Cream Makers	26	34	.433	
1989	Open Conference	Presto Ice Cream Makers	18	32	.360	
1989	All-Filipino Conference	Presto Ice Cream Makers	18	32	.360	
1989	Reinforced Conference	Presto Ice Cream Makers	18	32	.360	
1990	First Conference	Presto Ice Cream Makers	40	29	.580	
1990	All-Filipino Conference	Presto Tivolis	40	29	.580	Presto 4, Purefoods 3
1990	Third Conference		40	29	.580	
1991	First Conference	Presto Tivoli	21	29	.420	
1991	All-Filipino Conference	Presto Tivoli	21	29	.420	
1991	Third Conference	Presto Tivoli	21	29	.420	
1992	First Conference	Presto Ice Cream Kings	11	29	.275	
1992	All-Filipino Conference	Presto Ice Cream Kings	11	29	.275	
1992	Third Conference	Presto Ice Cream Kings	11	29	.275	
Overall record			408	476	.462	6 championships

== Awards ==
=== Individual awards ===
PBA Most Valuable Player	PBA Rookie of the Year Award	PBA All-Defensive Team
Ricardo Brown – 1985; Allan Caidic – 1990	Raphael Sison – 1981; Ricardo Brown – 1983; Allan Caidic – 1987; Gerry Esplana – 1990	Abe King – 1985; Philip Cezar – 1987–1988
PBA Mythical First Team	PBA Mythical Second Team	PBA Most Improved Player
Ricardo Brown – 1983–1986; Bogs Adornado – 1983; Manny Victorino – 1984–1986; Willie Pearson – 1985; Philip Cezar – 1987; Allan Caidic – 1987–1991	Bogs Adornado – 1984; Abe King – 1985; Ricardo Brown – 1987; Arnie Tuadles – 1987; Bernardo Carpio – 1987	Manny Victorino – 1984
PBA Best Import	PBA Scoring Leader	
Jeff Collins – 1984 Invitational	Ricardo Brown – 1985–1987; Allan Caidic – 1988–1991	

=== All-Star Weekend ===
All Star MVP	Obstacle Challenge	Three-point Shootout	Slam Dunk Contest
		Allan Caidic – 1992	Vergel Meneses – 1992

== Notable players ==
=== PBA Greatest players ===
In alphabetical order. Members of PBA Hall of Fame are in boldface.

- **William "Bogs" Adornado** #33
- **Ricardo Brown** #23 – "The Quick Brown Fox" named 1985 PBA Most Valuable Player
- **Allan Caidic** #8 – "The Triggerman" named 1987 PBA Rookie of the Year & 1990 PBA Most Valuable Player
- **Philip Cezar** #18 – "The Scholar"
- **Atoy Co** #60 and #6 – "The Fortune Cookie" played his final years in the league with the team.
- Bernie Fabiosa #15 – "The Sultan of Swipe"
- Vergel Meneses #4 – "The Aerial Voyager" was the #1 draft pick of the 1992 draft.
- **Manny Paner** #5 & #13 – Became the highest paid Filipino player in 1977, signed a 4-year contract called for P 8,000 a month.

=== Other notable players ===
- Jose "Jing" Aldanese #4
- Manuel "Noli" Aldanese #11
- Teodocio "Teddy" Alfarero #20+
- Alejo "Pongkee" Alolor #2
- Leonardo "Leo" Aranzaso #9
- Cesar "Kia" Arpilleda #17
- Woodrow Balani #19
- Joel Banal #26, #6, #7 & #28
- Danilo "Danny" Basilan #14
- Santiago "Sonny" Cabatu #5
- Bernardo "Joy" Carpio #29 – "The Scavenger"
- Israel "Ric" Catacutan #15
- Jacinto" Bong" Chua #8 & #9+
- Aurelio "Boy" Clarino #56
- Fortunato "Atoy" Co Jr. #6 #60 – "The Fortune Cookie"
- Arturo "Bai" Cristobal #7
- Carlito "Lito" Cruz #12
- Oliveros "Nonoy" Dalman #3
- Ramon "Onchie" Dela Cruz #9
- Danilo "Danny" De Guzman #10
- Valeriano "Botchok" Delos Santos #10+
- Hernani "Nani Demegillo #15
- Jaime "Jimmy" Dungca #6
- Gerald "Gerry" Esplana #14 – 1990 PBA Rookie of the Year – "Mr. Cool"
- Ernesto "Estoy" Estrada+ #6 & #44
- Reynaldo "Rey" Franco #20
- Wilfredo "Willy" Generalao #42 – "The General"
- Filomeno "Fil" Gulfin #8
- Noel Guzman #8
- Rene "Bong" Hawkins Jr. #16 – "The Hawk"
- Arthur "Art" Herrera #8
- Federico "Padim" Israel #17
- Peter "Apet" Jao #5 – #1 draft pick of 1990 PBA Draft
– “The Howitser"
- Alfredo "Pido" Jarencio #25 – "The Fireman"
- Woodrow "Totoy" Jaymalin #5
- Alfonso "Al" Jovero #12
- Abraham "Abe" King #6 #66 – "The Chairman of the Board"
- Francisco "Frankie" Lim #22
- Joaquin "Chito" Loyzaga #41 – "The Dynamite"
- Jaime "Jimmy" Manansala #11
- Joselito "Joey" Marquez #66
- Manuel "Totoy" Marquez #71
- Eduardo "Eddieboy" Mendoza #10
- Lawrence "Tata" Merced #18
- Jose Cadel Mosqueda #12
- Ruben "Benjie" Pablo #6
- Adriano "Jun" Papa, Jr. #55+
- Leonardo "Leo" Paguntalan #16
- Willie Pearson #33
- Danilo "Danny" Pribhdas, Jr+(father of Danilo, Jr. of the UST Growling Tigers) #13
- Zaldy Realubit #28
- Johnny Revilla #16+
- Florendo "Dante" Ritualo #20 / #11+
- Ranulfo "Noni" Robles #16
- Ricafort "Ric" Roces #15
- Jose "Joe" Roslin #19 & #14
- Rafael "Cho" Sison #12
- Loreto" Ato"Tolentino #7
- Tomasito "Sito" Tolentino #5
- Oscar "Oca" Tuazon #19
- Arnulfo "Arnie Tuadles" #11 & #22+
- Redentor "Red" Vicente, Sr. #45
- Manny Victorino #1

=== Imports ===
- Rich Adams #32 (1982)
- George Almones #32 (1988)
- Terrance Bailey #21 (1989 & 1991)
- Joe Binion #30 (1985)
- Norman Black #24 (1983)
- Cory Blackwell #30 (1985)
- Michael Britt #21 (1985)
- Johnny Brown #3 (1986)
- Lewis "Lew" Brown #24 (1980)
- Derwin "Tank" Collins #3 (1992)
- James Collins #13 (1978)
- Jeff Collins #24 (1984)
- Winston Crite #31 (1990)
- Perry Davis #30 (1982)
- Kenny Fields #54 (1988)
- Alvin Franklin #20 (1986)
- Jerome Harmon #32 (1992)
- Jim Hearns #33 (1979 & 1980)
- Michael Holton #14 (1986)
- Lewis Jackson #24 (1986)
- Harold Johnson #33 (1981)
- Napoleon Johnson #00 (1985)
- Greg Jones #3 (1986)
- Darryl "Choo" Kennedy #30 (1987)
- Dana Lewis #3 (1977)
- Lew Massey #23 (1981)
- Dwayne McClain #44 (1991)
- Dwight Moody #(1987 PBA/IBA series)
- Cisco Oliver #6 (1978)
- Myles Patrick #32 (1981)
- Wally Rank #21 (1985)
- Eldridge Recasner #7 (1992)
- Angelo Robinson #34 (1984)
- Walker Russell #3 (1989)
- Danny Salisbery #31 (1982)
- Niño Samuel #44 (1977)
- Dawan Scott #7 (1983)
- Dexter Shouse (1987 PBA/IBA series)
- Darryl Smith #68 (1979)
- Everette Stephens #21 (1990)
- Earl Tatum #42 (1981)
- Jeff Taylor #44 (1987)
- Charles Thompson #18 (1983)
- Eric Turner #12 (1986)
- Tony White #4 (1988)
- Mike Wilson #2 (1986)
- Ennis Whatley
- Joey Wright #5 (1992)
- Michael Young #42 (1987)

== Coaches ==
- Felicisimo Fajardo
- Tony Genato
- Nilo Verona
- Alfonso Marquez
- Baby Dalupan
- Jimmy Mariano
- Tommy Manotoc

== Team managers ==
- Ignacio Gotao
- Chino Marquinez

Preceded by (start)	PBA teams genealogies 1975–1992	Succeeded by Sta. Lucia Realtors
