= Dexter Shouse =

American basketball player (born 1963)

Personal information
- Born: March 24, 1963 (age 63) Terre Haute, Indiana, U.S.
- Listed height: 6 ft 2 in (1.88 m)
- Listed weight: 200 lb (91 kg)

Career information
- High school: North (Terre Haute, Indiana)
- College: Panola (1981–1983); South Alabama (1983–1985)
- NBA draft: 1985: 4th round, 92nd overall pick
- Drafted by: Los Angeles Lakers
- Playing career: 1985–1999
- Position: Point guard
- Number: 14

Career history
- 1985–1986: Kansas City Sizzlers
- 1985–1986: Baltimore Lightning
- 1986-1987: Formula Shell Oilers
- 1988–1990: Tulsa Fast Breakers
- 1989: Purefoods Tender Juicy Giants
- 1989: Philadelphia 76ers
- 1992-1993: Franca Basquetebol Clube
- 1995-1999: Panteras de Miranda

Career highlights
- CBA champion (1989); CBA Playoff/Finals MVP (1989)
- Stats at NBA.com
- Stats at Basketball Reference

Dexter Wayne Shouse (born March 24, 1963) is an American former basketball player who played college basketball for the South Alabama Jaguars and professionally in the National Basketball Association (NBA) for the Philadelphia 76ers during the 1989-90 NBA season.

Born in Terre Haute, Indiana, Shouse played in the Continental Basketball Association (CBA) for the Tulsa Fast Breakers from 1988 to 1990 and was selected as the CBA Playoff/Finals Most Valuable Player in 1989. He won a CBA championship with the Fast Breakers in 1989.

Shouse played basketball in the Philippines for the Formula Shell Oilers (1986-87) and the Purefoods Tender Juicy Giants (1989). Known for playing with a perpetual scowl which became a signature trademark of his "bad boy" and highly competitive persona on the court. Shouse caught the attention of the NBA's Philadelphia 76ers by averaging 50 points per game in Manila during the 1989 Philippine Basketball Association season. Shouse was signed by the 76ers during the 1989–90 season. Unfortunately for Shouse, his NBA career did not take off as hoped.

Brazilian coaching legend Helio Rubens Garcia called Shouse the most talented player whom he ever had the privilege of coaching.
