= Ramon Fernandez =

Filipino basketball player (born 1953)

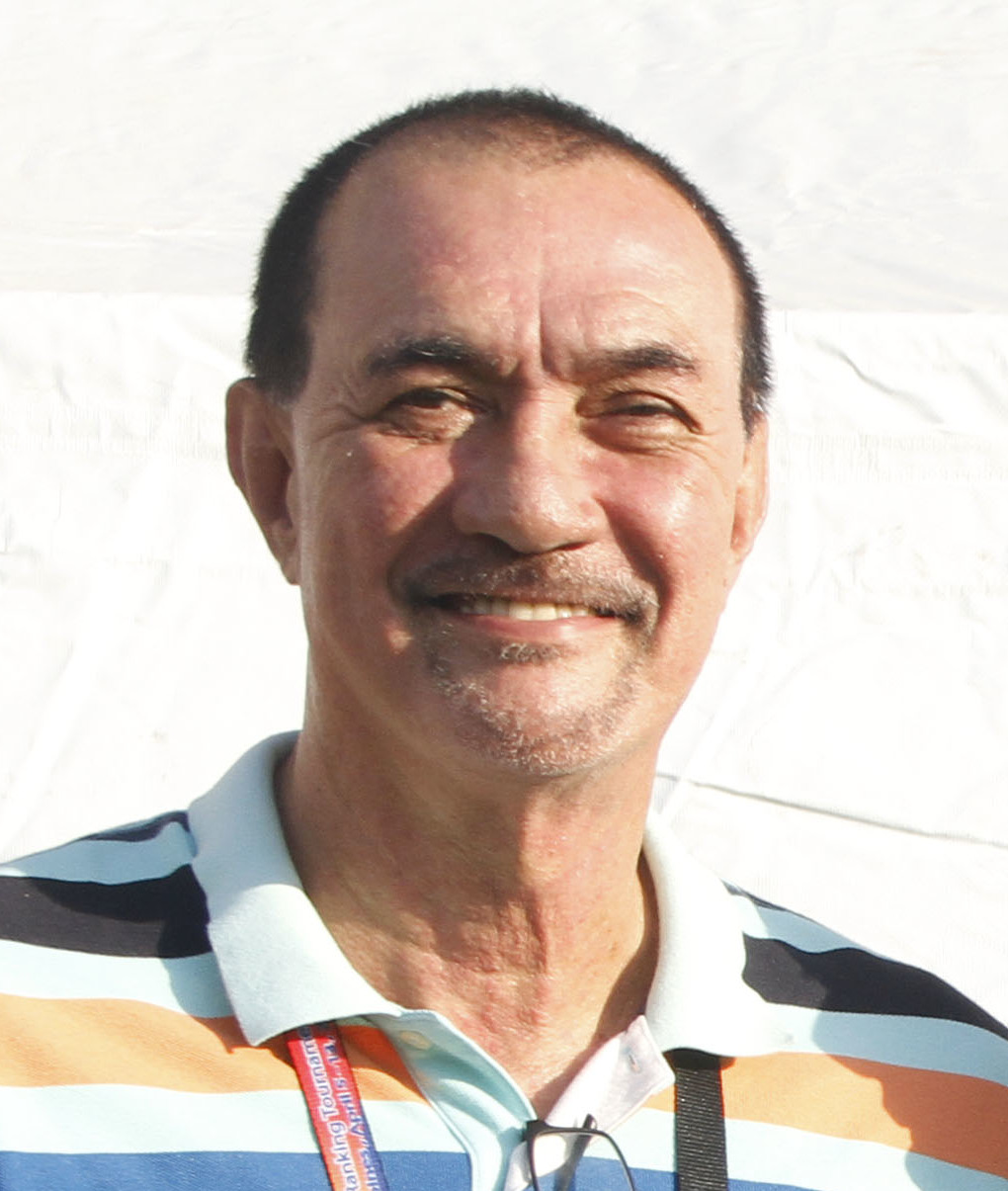
- Fernandez in 2018

Commissioner of the Philippine Sports Commission
- In office 2016–2022

Personal details
- Party: NPC
- Basketball career

Personal information
- Born: 3 October 1953 (age 73) Maasin, Leyte, Philippines
- Listed height: 6 ft 4 in (1.93 m)
- Listed weight: 178 lb (81 kg)

Career information
- College: USC
- PBA draft: 1975 Elevated
- Drafted by: Toyota Comets
- Playing career: 1972–1994
- Position: Center / power forward
- Number: 10, 19

Career history

Playing
- 1972: San Miguel Corporation Braves
- 1973–1984: Toyota
- 1984–1985: Beer Hausen/Manila Beer
- 1985–1987: Tanduay Rhum Makers
- 1988: Purefoods Hotdogs
- 1988–1994: San Miguel Beermen

Coaching
- 1988: Purefoods Hotdogs

Career highlights
- 19× PBA champion (1975 First, 1975 Second, 1977 Invitational, 1978 All-Filipino, 1978 Invitational, 1979 Invitational, 1981 Open, 1982 Reinforced Filipino, 1982 Open, 1986 Reinforced, 1986 All-Filipino, 1987 Open, 1988 Reinforced, 1989 Open, 1989 All-Filipino, 1989 Reinforced, 1992 All-Filipino, 1993 Governors', 1994 All-Filipino); 5× PBA All-Star (1989, 1990, 1991, 1993, 1994); 4× PBA Most Valuable Player (1982, 1984, 1986, 1988); 13× PBA Mythical First Team (1976–1982, 1984, 1986, 1988, 1989, 1991, 1992); 3× PBA Mythical Second Team (1985, 1987, 1990); 2× PBA scoring champion (1983–1984); PBA All-Time Scoring Leader; 50 Greatest Players in PBA History (2000 selection); PBA Hall of Fame Class of 2005; No. 19 retired by the San Miguel Beermen
Medals
Men's basketball
Representing Philippines
FIBA Asia Under-18 Championship
| Gold medal – first place | 1972 Manila | Team |
FIBA Asia Championship
| Gold medal – first place | 1973 Manila | Team |
Asian Games
| Silver medal – second place | 1990 Beijing | Team |

Ramon Sadaya Fernandez (Tagalog: [raˈmon feɾˈnandes]; born October 3, 1953) is a Filipino former professional basketball player and former commissioner of the Philippine Sports Commission. Fernandez won four PBA Most Valuable Player awards and a record of 19 PBA titles. Fernandez stood at 6'4 barefoot for much of his career but due to mild gigantism, he grew to 6'5 during his final seasons. He scored 18,996 points to finish as the PBA's all-time scoring leader. He is also the PBA's all-time leader in rebounds, blocked shots, and free throws made, playing minutes and second all-time in assists, games played and steals. He played for five teams in his entire PBA career starting with the Toyota, Manila Beer, Tanduay, Purefoods and San Miguel. Fernandez also played in multiple international tournaments as a member of the Philippine basketball team.

He is regarded as one of the greatest players to have ever played in the Philippine Basketball Association with analysts and former players citing him as arguably the greatest ever. He was one of the original 25 players selected in the PBA's list of Greatest Players. In 2026, the trophy given to the PBA Finals MVP was named in his honor.

After retiring, Fernandez became a commissioners of several basketball leagues, including the Metropolitan Basketball Association. In 2016, he was appointed as one of the four commissioners of the Philippine Sports Commission.

== Early life and amateur career ==
Fernandez was born in Maasin, Leyte as the youngest of nine siblings. He first played basketball at five years old, as he was influenced by his older brothers. After two years studying at a seminary, he graduated from University of San Carlos in Cebu, playing for their Warriors from 1970 to 1972.

In 1972, with intentions of joining either San Sebastian, Fernandez joined the San Miguel Braves, playing in the Manila Industrial and Commercial Athletic Association (MICAA). The following year, after the Braves won the 1973 MICAA National Open, he transferred to the newly formed Komatsu Komets (later renamed the Toyota Comets). He then underwent residency at San Sebastian, but then attempted to transfer to DLSU. When Toyota joined the Philippine Basketball Association (PBA), Fernandez joined them as well, foregoing plans for a stint in the NCAA or UAAP.

== Professional career ==
=== Toyota Comets ===
Fernandez moved to the PBA in 1975, when the Toyota Comets became one of the nine pioneer teams of the league. Playing in the very first game of the inaugural season, he debuted with 13 points for a winning debut. With his teammates Robert Jaworski, Francis Arnáiz, Arnie Tuadles, Danny Florencio, Emerito "Emer" Legaspi and Abe King, Toyota won nine titles from 1975-1983. However, they also lost in several finals, such as three straight sweeps in 1976 and in the 1980 Open Conference finals, when they lost Game 5 to the U/Tex Wranglers despite holding a four-point lead with 16 seconds remaining. He was the 1982 PBA Most Valuable Player, the only time he achieved the award during his days with the fabled Toyota team as he led Toyota to win two of their nine titles that season (the Reinforced Conference and the Open Conference) despite injuries to Jaworski. When Jaworski returned in the 1983 season, tension began brewing between him and Fernandez, which was fueled by the media.

=== Beer Hausen ===
After Toyota's disbandment in 1984, Fernandez and several former Toyota teammates joined Beer Hausen. With Toyota's disbandment, the ongoing feud between Fernandez and Jaworski became public. Fernandez won the 1984 MVP award, his second, during his first season with the Lucio Tan-owned franchise in which he had over 20 triple-doubles. He was not able to win a championship with the team.

=== Tanduay Rhum Makers ===
Fernandez was shipped in the middle of the 1985 season to Tanduay for Abet Guidaben. From 1986–1987, he along with former Crispa rivals Freddie Hubalde and Padim Israel, J.B. Yango, Willie Generalao, Onchie dela Cruz and imports Rob Williams, Andre McKoy and later, David Thirdkill, led the Rhum Masters to three PBA titles in two seasons, including one over Jaworski in the 1986 All-Filipino Conference. Fernandez won his third MVP award in 1986.

=== Purefoods Hotdogs ===
Tanduay would disband before the 1988 season, but the franchise rights were bought by Purefoods. Fernandez would become playing coach, his first coaching stint, of a young team composed of Jerry Codiñera, Jojo Lastimosa, Al Solis, Glenn Capacio and later Alvin Patrimonio. In the 1988 Open Conference, he led his new team to a runner-up finish against San Miguel. However, midway through the All-Filipino Conference, he would relinquish his coaching duties to his assistant, Cris Calilan, to concentrate on his game. But in a controversial move, Fernandez was benched during the finals against the Añejo Rhum 65ers as there were allegations of game fixing, which led to Añejo Rhum winning the title.

=== San Miguel Beermen ===
The said event led to his transfer to San Miguel Beer in exchange for, the second time, Abet Guidaben. Fernandez would later lead the Beermen to the 1988 Reinforced Conference title and also won his fourth MVP Award, becoming the first and only player to win four MVP awards with four teams.

Fernandez was a vital cog in San Miguel's historic grand slam run in 1989, and also made the Mythical First Team that season. He also made amends with rival Jaworski during the All-Star Game of the same season, when he scored an under goal stab off a Jaworski inbound pass at half court, to lead the Veterans to a 132-130 win over the Rookie-Sophomores team. Legendary coach Baby Dalupan, then coaching the Veterans, summoned both players to a historic handshake at centercourt, signaling the end of their bitter feud. However, despite leading his team to the "triple crown" that season, he narrowly lost to rookie Benjie Paras in the MVP balloting, denying the then 36-year old veteran a fifth MVP plum.

In 1994, Fernandez retired after a 20-year PBA career. He ended his PBA career as the all-time leader in most points scored with 18,996, second in assists with 5,220, first in defensive rebounds with 6,435, second in offensive rebounds behind Guidaben with 2,217, first in overall rebounds with 8,652, first in minutes played with 36624:30, second in games played, first in blocks with 1,853, and second in steals with 1,302 (first at retirement in 1994). He and Jaworski are the only players with 10,000 points, 5,000 rebounds, and 5,000 assists in their careers. He ended with career averages of 17.7 points per game, 8.1 rebounds per game, 4.9 assists per game, 1.2 steals per game, and 1.7 blocks per game in 1,074 games.

== National team career ==
Fernandez was a member of several Philippine national teams. These include the teams for the 1972 ABC Under-18 Championship, the 1974 FIBA World Championship, and the 1974 Asian Games. He was also on the team that won the 1973 ABC Championship.

In 1990, Fernandez was a member of the first Philippine national team that was composed of professional players. Coached by Jaowrski, the team won a silver medal in the Beijing Asian Games. He was supposed to participate on the 1994 Asian Games team, but begged off due to an injury. That year also saw the final season of Fernandez's PBA career when he announced his retirement.

== Post-PBA career ==
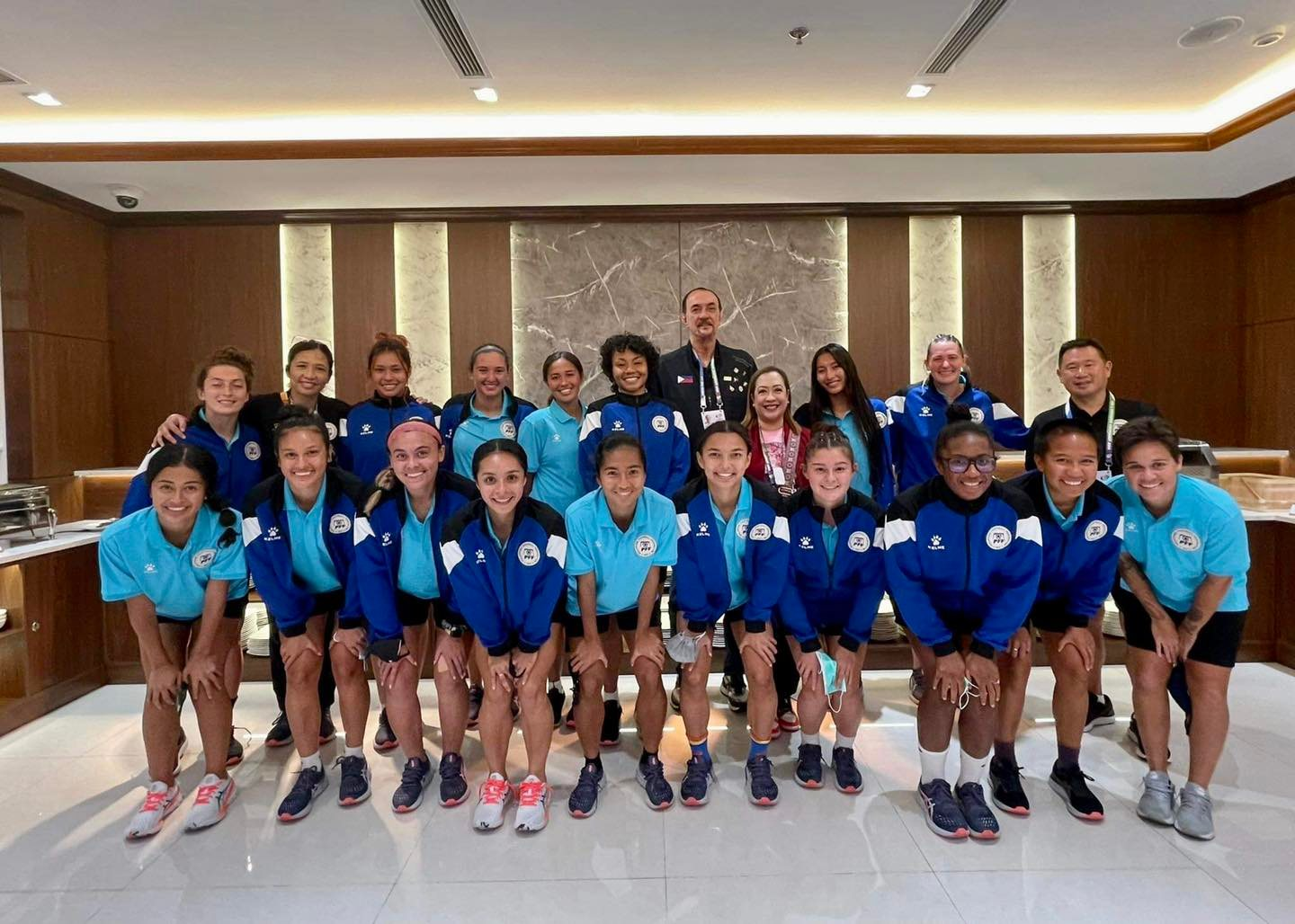
Fernandez with the Philippines women's national football team at the 2021 Southeast Asian Games in Hanoi

After his playing career, Fernandez ran for a senatorial seat under the Nationalist People's Coalition in 1995 but lost. In 1998, he became the first commissioner of the defunct professional league, the Metropolitan Basketball Association. In 2003, Fernandez was named the Commissioner of the Collegiate Champions League tournament. He also became the Commissioner of the now-inactive United Regional Basketball League during its only run in 2004. In 2015, Fernandez was considered a possible candidate to become the PBA's commissioner after the resignation of Chito Salud.

Fernandez has frequently appeared in PBA Legends Reunion games held in the Philippines and internationally. Fernandez was part of the Toyota Tamaraws in the Crispa-Toyota Reunion Game. The highlight of the event was the kick out pass of Fernandez to Jaworski, who sank a three-pointer to seal the Tamaraws' 65–61 win over their bitter rivals, the Redmanizers. When Fernandez was inducted in the PBA Hall of Fame, he participated in the Greatest Game, a reunion of several members of the league's 25 Greatest Players, on May 30, 2005 when they lost to the TM Greats team, 96–92. In 2019, he coached Purefoods in a "Return of the Rivals" exhibition game.

Fernandez also ventured in several business opportunities and is currently based in Cebu, managing his "Suka ni El Presidente" brand of bottled spiced vinegar. In 2018, Fernandez was appointed to the Board of Directors for UGE Philippines, a local leader in solar energy solutions for the commercial and industrial sector - a subsidiary of UGE International. He first became involved with UGE in 2015 due to an interest in renewable energy advocacy. He also runs a foundation, the Ramon Fernandez Sports and Youth Development Foundation, that supports athletes' welfare.

In 2016, Fernandez was appointed as one of the four commissioners of the Philippine Sports Commission (PSC). In his tenure, he advocated for grassroots sports development, athlete welfare, and training programs for young athletes. On June 29, 2020, he became the Officer in Charge of the PSC in lieu of Chairperson William "Butch" Ramirez. Ramirez went on leave until July 20 to attend to his sick wife. During the 2021 Hanoi SEA Games, Fernandez served as chef de mission of the Philippine delegation.

== Personal life ==
=== Marriage ===
Fernandez has been married to Karla Kintanar, who comes from a prominent family in Argao, Cebu, since 2007. He was previously married to a woman named Marissa, who accused him in 2005 of physical abuse, which Fernandez has denied. They had four children together.

=== Gigantism ===
In a September 2015 interview, Fernandez revealed that he has a mild case of gigantism after discovering he had grown to 6'7". During his PBA career, his listed height was only between 6'4" and 6'5".

== Player profile ==
Fernandez could play all five positions on the basketball court. In high school, he played as a point guard before he grew tall enough for his era to man the frontcourt, retaining his ball-handling and passing skills. He was often taller than most players on his team, which made him play center. Almost always, whenever he would get the defensive rebound, he would assume the role of "point-center" and start a fastbreak, either hitting a full-court pass or scoring it himself.

Offensively, he could play facing the basket or with his back to it. His ambidexterity, which was compared to Carlos Loyzaga's, allowed him to switch the ball in mid-air to draw fouls or finish through contact. An example of this was seen in his "kili-kili" (armpit) shot, which he set up by driving down the middle of the lane coming from the right side of the court, faking a right-handed shot and then, at the last second when the defender has committed himself, switching the ball to his left hand for a scoop shot under the armpit of the same defender. He is also well known for his trademark one handed running shot dubbed as "the elegant shot". Aside from these, he had a variety of hook shots, pivot moves, pump fakes, no-look passes, looping shots, fadeaways and an array of what seemed to be trick shots from near or under the basket that he executed to get his shot off. He could also shoot jumpers from inside the arc. His ability to create scoring opportunities for both himself and his teammates distinguished him from most centers of his era, who typically played primarily in the low post.

Although he did not possess exceptional athleticism when compared with foreign imports and with his peers, he relied on skill, footwork, court vision, basketball intelligence, and composure to control the game. His versatility enabled him to excel as both a scorer and playmaker, making him one of the league's most complete players. This was seen in the 1984 PBA season, where he averaged 27.8 points, 11.2 rebounds, and 9.9 assists, narrowly missing a season-long triple-double as he won his second MVP.

== Legacy ==
Fernandez is regarded as one of the prominent players of the PBA’s golden era and remains a well-known figure in Philippine basketball. Throughout his career, he was known by several nicknames including nicknames "The Franchise," "El Presidente," and "Don Ramon". His resume includes 19 PBA championships, the most for any player in league history, 30 PBA finals appearances, and four MVPs, each with a different team. His no. 19 jersey was also retired by San Miguel.

In 2000, Fernandez was included in the PBA's 25 Greatest Players' list and was awarded during the league's anniversary on April 9, 2000. He was also inducted in the PBA Hall of Fame. He was on the committee that selected the next batch for the PBA's 50 Greatest list.

On January 15, 2026, the PBA Press Corps announced that the trophy awarded to the PBA Finals MVP will be known as the Ramon Fernandez Trophy starting with the 2025–26 PBA Philippine Cup finals. Later that year, he and six other athletes were inducted into the Philippine Sports Hall of Fame.

== Basketball achievements ==
=== PBA ===
- 4-time Most Valuable Player (1982, 1984, 1986, 1988)
- Member of the 1989 San Miguel Grand Slam Team
- 13-time Mythical First Team Selection (1976, 1977, 1978, 1979, 1980, 1981, 1982, 1984, 1986, 1988, 1989, 1991, 1992)
- 3-time Mythical Second Team Selection (1985, 1987, and 1990)
- 6-time PBA All-Star
- PBA All-Time Scoring Leader
- Member of PBA's 25 Greatest Players
- Member of PBA's 40 Greatest Players
- PBA Hall of Fame Class of 2005
- No. 19 retired by San Miguel Beermen

=== Philippine Sports ===
- PSA Lifetime Achievement Award – as individual and as member of the 1973 ABC Championship team
- Philippine Sports Hall of Fame – Batch of 2026

== PBA career statistics ==
Legend
| GP | Games played | MPG | Minutes per game |
| FG% | Field-goal percentage | 3P% | 3-point field-goal percentage | FT% | Free-throw percentage |
| RPG | Rebounds per game | APG | Assists per game | SPG | Steals per game |
| BPG | Blocks per game | PPG | Points per game | **Bold** | Career high |

| Year | Team | GP | MPG | FG% | 3P% | FT% | RPG | APG | SPG | BPG | PPG |
|---|---|---|---|---|---|---|---|---|---|---|---|
| 1975 | Toyota | 56 | 31.43 | .428 | .000 | .787 | 8.64 | 3.77 | 1.13 | 2.38 | 13.16 |
| 1976 | Toyota | 58 | 30.93 | .469 | .000 | .625 | 8.45 | 3.41 | 1.57 | 2.26 | 16.17 |
| 1977 | Toyota | 53 | 32.83 | .480 | .000 | .652 | 6.91 | 3.17 | 1.43 | 2.47 | 18.23 |
| 1978 | Toyota | 54 | 36.0 | .502 | .000 | .792 | 9.7 | 4.28 | **1.87** | 2.46 | 20.65 |
| 1979 | Toyota | 53 | 33.0 | .494 | .000 | .783 | 9.36 | 4.04 | 1.38 | **2.51** | 18.85 |
| 1980 | Toyota | 53 | 32.55 | .487 | .375 | .728 | 8.83 | 3.70 | 1.45 | 1.79 | 15.85 |
| 1981 | Toyota | 43 | 33.7 | .488 | .000 | .803 | 8.05 | 4.14 | 1.26 | 1.74 | 19.65 |
| 1982 | Toyota | 67 | 36.97 | .486 | .177 | .739 | 8.01 | 5.16 | 1.27 | 1.61 | 20.31 |
| 1983 | Toyota | 38 | 37.32 | .524 | .077 | .791 | 10.95 | 5.71 | 1.29 | 1.89 | 24.16 |
| 1984 | Beer Hausen | 64 | **40.8** | **.525** | .000 | .808 | **11.17** | **9.92** | 1.53 | 2.09 | **27.80** |
| 1985 | Manila Beer / Tanduay | 37 | 39.32 | .490 | .000 | .720 | 8.81 | 6.51 | 1.24 | 1.22 | 19.65 |
| 1986 | Tanduay | 62 | 39.19 | .451 | .000 | .707 | 9.92 | 5.77 | 1.27 | 2.35 | 18.32 |
| 1987 | Tanduay | 43 | 40.49 | .464 | .259 | .729 | 10.56 | 5.56 | 1.40 | 2.02 | 19.49 |
| 1988 | Purefoods / San Miguel | 67 | 33.52 | .436 | .000 | .803 | 7.51 | 4.36 | 0.94 | 1.10 | 14.45 |
| 1989 | San Miguel Beer | 69 | 33.43 | .467 | .154 | .785 | 7.55 | 5.01 | 1.01 | 1.23 | 18.57 |
| 1990 | San Miguel Beer | 49 | 36.22 | .506 | .286 | **.836** | 6.63 | 5.63 | 0.90 | 1.14 | 21.53 |
| 1991 | San Miguel Beer | 64 | 37.33 | .440 | .222 | **.836** | 7.19 | 5.03 | 1.16 | 1.67 | 18.83 |
| 1992 | San Miguel Beer | **71** | 31.10 | .419 | .389 | .810 | 5.83 | 5.04 | 0.90 | 1.01 | 12.48 |
| 1993 | San Miguel Beer | 42 | 19.36 | .387 | .000 | .609 | 3.14 | 2.83 | 0.52 | 0.43 | 5.33 |
| 1994 | San Miguel Beer | 31 | 17.16 | .413 | **1.000** | .674 | 2.52 | 2.42 | 0.42 | 0.58 | 5.74 |
| Career | | 1074 | 34.10 | .473 | .175 | .768 | 8.06 | 4.86 | 1.21 | 1.73 | 17.69 |

== Coaching career ==
=== PBA ===
| Season | Team | Conference | Elims./clas. round | | | | | Playoffs | | | | |
| Season | Team | Conference | GP | W | L | PCT | Finish | PG | W | L | PCT | Results |
|---|---|---|---|---|---|---|---|---|---|---|---|---|
| 1988 | Purefoods | Open | 10 | 6 | 4 | .600 | 3rd | 15 | 9 | 6 | .600 | Lost in the finals |
| 1988 | Purefoods | All-Filipino | 14 | 8 | 4 | .667 | 1st | 9 | 5 | 4 | .556 | Fired (Note: Dismissed after finals game 1.) |
| Career Total | | | 24 | 14 | 8 | .429 | Playoff Total | 24 | 14 | 10 | .583 | 0 championship |

Notes

| Preceded by First | Purefoods head coach 1988 | Succeeded by Cris Calilan |
| Preceded by First | Metropolitan Basketball Association Commissioner; 1998-1999 | Succeeded by Ogie Narvasa |
