= Joe Lipa =

Filipino basketball coach and executive

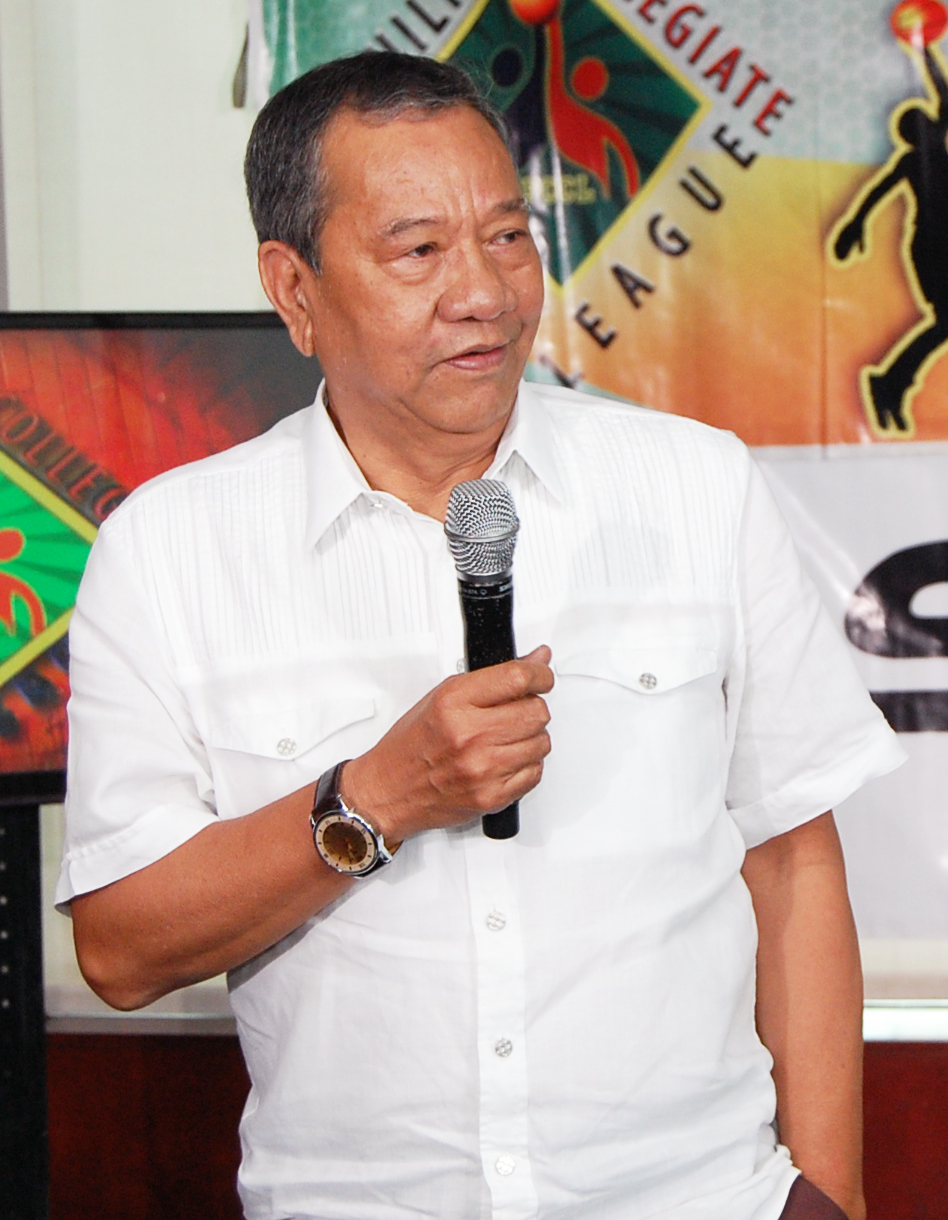

Commissioner of the National Collegiate Athletic Association Basketball
- In office 2012–2013
- Preceded by: Aric del Rosario
- Succeeded by: Bai Cristobal
- In office 2008–2009
- Preceded by: Chito Narvasa
- Succeeded by: Aric del Rosario

Commissioner of the University Athletic Association of the Philippines Basketball
- In office 2009–2010
- Preceded by: Chito Narvasa
- Succeeded by: Ato Badolato
- In office 2005–2006
- Preceded by: Ato Badolato
- Succeeded by: Elmer Yanga
- In office 1998–1999

Personal details
- Occupation: Basketball coach and executive
- Basketball career

Personal information
- Born: November 1, 1943 (age 83)

Career information
- College: UP

Career history

Playing
- 1965–1966: San Miguel

Coaching
- 1981–1986: UP
- 1986: Manila Beer Brewmasters
- 1986–1989: Philippines
- 1987–1988; 1994: Shell
- 1995: Philippines
- 1995: UP
- 1999–2001: Ateneo / Ateneo-Pioneer
- 1999–2001: Nueva Ejica Patriots
- 2004–2005: FedEx Express
- 2006–2007: UP
- 2014–2017: Columbian Dyip (consultant)
- 2022–2024: Terrafirma 3x3

Career highlights
- As head coach: UAAP champion (1986)
Medals
Men's basketball
Head coach for Philippines
Asian Games
Bronze medal – third place	1986 Seoul	Team
SEA Games
Gold medal – first place	1987 Jakarta	Team
Gold medal – first place	1995 Chiang Mai	Team

Jose "Joe" Lipa, Jr. is a Filipino basketball former coach and executive.

Lipa formerly coached his alma mater, the University of the Philippines, in the University Athletic Association of the Philippines men's basketball. He also had a head coaching stint for the Manila Beer Brewmasters, Ateneo Blue Eagles, the Shell Turbo Chargers and the FedEx Express of the professional Philippine Basketball Association. Lipa is also a former head coach of the national basketball team of the Philippines, coaching the team to a bronze medal finish in the 1986 Asian Games. He was also named the Commissioner of the UAAP for its basketball tournament in 2005. He currently serves as the tournament director and commissioner of the Philippine Collegiate Champions League and the Filoil EcoOil Preseason Cup.

== Profile ==
An Economics graduate at the State University, Joe Lipa played with the Maroons in 1963–66. He also donned the San Miguel jersey in the MICAA in 1965–66, where he played as a power forward. Starting in 1981, he was assigned to handle the UP Maroons after serving as assistant coach way back in 1978, Lipa was sent on a basketball scholarship to the United States in 1984, where he observed the coaching prowess of famed mentor Bobby Knight of Indiana University during sessions at the University of Southern California. He made the trip through the help of the UP Sports Foundation, courtesy of the UP President, and his Sigma Rho fraternity brothers. In 1986, Joe led his alumni, the UP Maroons to its first UAAP championship after 47 years.

== Coaching record ==
=== Collegiate record ===
Season	Team	Eliminations					Playoffs				
Season	Team	GP	W	L	PCT	Finish	PG	W	L	PCT	Results
1995	UP	14	5	9	.357	5th	—	—	—	—	Eliminated
1999	ADMU	14	10	4	.722	3rd	1	0	1	.000	Semifinals
2000	ADMU	14	11	3	.786	2nd	2	0	2	.000	Semifinals
2001	ADMU	14	10	4	.714	2nd	4	2	2	.250	Finals
2006	UP	14	4	8	.333	6th	—	—	—	—	Eliminated
2007	UP	14	0	14	.000	8th	—	—	—	—	Eliminated
Totals since 1995		82	40	42	.488		7	2	5	.286	0 championship

=== Philippine Basketball Association record ===
Season	Conference	Team	Elimination/Classification round					Playoffs				
Season	Conference	Team	GP	W	L	PCT	Finish	PG	W	L	PCT	Result
1986	Reinforced	Manila Beer	10	2	8	.200	6th	—	—	—	—	Eliminated
1987	Reinforced	Formula Shell	10	7	3	.700	1st	12	2	10	.167	Fourth place
1988	Open	Shell	10	1	9	.100	6th	—	—	—	—	Eliminated
1988	All-Filipino	Shell	12	3	9	.250	6th	—	—	—	—	Eliminated
1994	Commissioner's Cup	Shell	11	6	5	.545	5th	8	2	6	.250	Semifinals
1994	Governor's Cup	Shell	10	5	5	.500	4th	11	4	7	.364	Semifinals
2004–05	Philippine Cup	FedEx	18	6	12	.333	9th	1	0	1	.000	Wildcard round
Career total			81	30	51	.370	Playoff total	32	8	24	.250	0 PBA championships

=== Metropolitan Basketball Association record ===
Season	Conference	Team	Elimination/Classification round					Playoffs				
Season	Conference	Team	GP	W	L	PCT	Finish	PG	W	L	PCT	Result
1999	National Conference	Nueva Ejica Patriots	30	7	23		13th	—	—	—	—	Eliminated
2000	The Cross Over Cup		13	5	9		11th					Eliminated
2000	Intracon Conference Challege		12	5	7		9th					Eliminated
2001	1st Phase		14	3	11		7th					Eliminated
2001	2nd Phase		14	3	11		8th					Eliminated
Career total			83	23	61		Playoff total	0	0	0	0	0 MBA championships

Preceded by Dave Perez	UP Fighting Maroons men's basketball head coach 1981-1986	Succeeded by Mon Bernabe
Preceded by Ed Ocampo	Formula Shell head coach 1987-1988	Succeeded by Dante Silverio
Preceded by Rino Salazar	Formula Shell head coach 1994	Succeeded by Chito Narvasa
Preceded by -	UP Fighting Maroons men's basketball head coach 1995	Succeeded by Eric Altamirano
Preceded by	UAAP basketball commissioner 1998	Succeeded by -
Preceded by Mark Molina	Ateneo Blue Eagles men's basketball head coach 1999-2001	Succeeded by Joel Banal
Preceded by first	Ateneo-Pioneer head coach 1999-2001	Succeeded by Ricky Dandan
Preceded by Ato Badolato	UAAP basketball commissioner 2005	Succeeded by Elmer Yanga
Preceded by Lito Vergara	UP Fighting Maroons men's basketball head coach 2006-2007	Succeeded by Aboy Castro
Preceded by Chito Narvasa	Philippine NCAA basketball commissioner 2008	Succeeded by Aric del Rosario
Preceded by Chito Narvasa	UAAP basketball commissioner 2009	Succeeded by Ato Badolato
Preceded by Aric del Rosario	Philippine NCAA basketball commissioner 2012	Succeeded by
Preceded by Raymond Tiongco	Terrafirma 3x3 head coach 2022–present	Succeeded by
