= 1988 PBA All-Filipino Conference =

- Duration: June 26 - September 13, 1988
- TV partner(s): Vintage Sports (PTV)

Finals
- Champions: Añejo Rum 65ers
- Runners-up: Purefoods Hotdogs

PBA All-Filipino Conference chronology
- < 1987 1989 >

PBA conference chronology
- < 1988 Open 1988 PBA/IBA >

The 1988 Philippine Basketball Association (PBA) All-Filipino Conference was the second conference of the 1988 PBA season. It started on June 26 and ended on September 13, 1988. The tournament is an All-Filipino format, which does not allow an import for each team. The Philippine national basketball team played as guest team for this conference.

== Format ==
The following format will be observed for the duration of the conference:

- Double-round robin eliminations; 12 games per team; Teams are then seeded by basis on win–loss records.
- The two teams with the worst record after the elimination round will be eliminated.
- Semifinals will be two round robin affairs with the five remaining teams. Results from the elimination round will be carried over.
- The top two teams in the semifinals advance to the best of five finals. The last two teams dispute the third-place trophy in a best-of-three playoff.

== Elimination round ==
Pos	Team	W	L	PCT	GB	Qualification
1	Purefoods Hotdogs	8	4	.667	—	Semifinal round
2	San Miguel Beermen	8	4	.667	—	Semifinal round
3	Alaska Milkmen	7	5	.583	1	Semifinal round
4	Añejo Rum 65ers	7	5	.583	1	Semifinal round
5	Great Taste Instant Milk	6	6	.500	2	Semifinal round
6	Shell Rimula X Diesel Oilers	3	9	.250	5	
7	Philippine national team (G)	3	9	.250	5	

(G) Guests

== Semifinal round ==
Overall standings
Pos	Team	W	L	PCT	GB	Qualification
1	Purefoods Hotdogs	13	7	.650	—	Advance to the Finals
2	Añejo Rum 65ers	12	8	.600 (Note: Second-seed playoff: Añejo 102–100 San Miguel)	1	Advance to the Finals
3	San Miguel Beermen	12	8	.600	1	Proceed to third place playoffs
4	Alaska Milkmen	10	10	.500	3	Proceed to third place playoffs
5	Great Taste Instant Milk	9	11	.450	4	

Notes:

Semifinal round standings
Pos	Team	W	L
1	Añejo Rum 65ers	5	3
2	Purefoods Hotdogs	5	3
3	San Miguel Beermen	4	4
4	Alaska Milkmen	3	5
5	Great Taste Instant Milk	3	5

== Third place playoffs ==
Vintage

September 6

San Miguel Beermen 112, Alaska Milkmen 108

The ULTRA, Pasig

Vintage

September 8

San Miguel Beermen 115, Alaska Milkmen 121

The ULTRA, Pasig

Vintage

September 11

San Miguel Beermen 87, Alaska Milkmen 98
Alaska wins series, 2–1

The ULTRA, Pasig

== Finals ==
Vintage

September 6

Purefoods Hotdogs 105, Añejo Rum 65ers 111

The ULTRA, Pasig

Vintage

September 8

Purefoods Hotdogs 117, Añejo Rum 65ers 112

The ULTRA, Pasig

Vintage

September 11

Purefoods Hotdogs 110, Añejo Rum 65ers 112

The ULTRA, Pasig

Vintage

September 13

Purefoods Hotdogs 124, Añejo Rum 65ers 135 (OT)
Añejo Rum wins series, 3–1

The ULTRA, Pasig
