= Cris Calilan =

Filipino basketball player and coach

Personal information
- Born: July 8, 1952 (age 74) Quezon City, Philippines
- Listed height: 5 ft 8 in (1.73 m)
- Listed weight: 165 lb (75 kg)

Career information
- College: JRC
- Playing career: 1974–1979
- Position: Point guard
- Number: 23
- Coaching career: 1987–2006

Career history

Playing
- 1974–1977: Crispa Redmanizers
- 1978: Filmanbank

Coaching
- 1987: Ateneo
- 1988; 1989–1991: Purefoods Hotdogs (assistant)
- 1988–1989: Purefoods Hotdogs
- 1992–1994: Shell Rimula X/Helix Oilers (assistant)
- 1994: Ateneo
- 1999–2001: Barangay Ginebra Kings (assistant)
- 2004–2006: JRU

Career highlights
- As player: NCAA champions (1972); 6× PBA champion (1975 All-Philippine, 1976 First Conference, 1976 Second Conference, 1976 All-Philippine, 1977 All-Filipino, 1977 Open); PBA Grand Slam champion (1976); As assistant coach: 2× PBA champion (1990 Third, 1992 First); As head coach: UAAP champion (1987)

Cristino Calilan (born July 8, 1952) is a Filipino former basketball coach and former player.

== Playing career ==
Calilan played for his alma mater Jose Rizal College (JRC; now known as Jose Rizal University or JRU) varsity basketball team JRC Heavy Bombers in the National Collegiate Athletic Association (Philippines) (NCAA). The team won the 1972 NCAA championship, when they were led by Philip Cezar, his brother David, and Jimmy Santos. Calilan was coached by his father Francisco while in JRC. Calilan later played for Crispa and Filmanbank in the professional Philippine Basketball Association (PBA).

== Coaching career ==
Calilan coached the Ateneo Blue Eagles and led them to their first University Athletic Association of the Philippines championship in 1987. The team was packed by future PBA players Olsen Racela, Eric Reyes, and Danny Francisco defeating Jerry Codiñera-led UE in 1987.

After winning the UAAP championship, he also coached the Purefoods franchise in the PBA, served an assistant to the Shell, and Barangay Ginebra. He lastly served as the head coach of his alma mater JRU.

== Coaching record ==
=== PBA ===
Season	Team	Conference	Elims./Clas. round					Playoffs				
Season	Team	Conference	GP	W	L	PCT	Finish	PG	W	L	PCT	Results
1988	Purefoods	All-Filipino	—	—	—	—	(DNC) (Note: Did not coach.)	2	1	2	.333	Lost in the Finals
1988	Purefoods	Reinforced	10	1	9	.100	6th	—	—	—	—	Missed playoffs
1989	Purefoods	Open	10	4	6	.400	4th	1	0	1	.000	(Demoted)
Totals			20	5	15	.250		4	1	3	.250	0 PBA championship

=== Collegiate record ===
Season	Eliminations						Playoffs				
Season	Team	Finish	GP	W	L	PCT	PG	W	L	PCT	Results
1987	ADMU	1st	14	13	1	.929	1	1	0	1.000	Champion
1994	ADMU	6th	12	4	8	.333	—	—	—	—	Eliminated
2004	JRU	7th	14	4	10	.286	—	—	—	—	Eliminated
2005	JRU	8th	14	2	12	.143	—	—	—	—	Eliminated
Totals			54	23	31	.426	1	1	0	1.000	1 championship
