= 1988 PBA Open Conference finals =

Basketball tournament in the Philippines

Team	Coach	Wins
San Miguel Beermen	Norman Black	4
Purefoods Hotdogs	Ramon Fernandez	3
- Dates: May 26 – June 9, 1988
- Television: Vintage Sports (PTV)
- Radio network: DZSR

PBA Open Conference finals chronology
- < 1987 1989 >

The 1988 PBA Open Conference finals was the basketball championship of the 1988 PBA Open Conference, and the conclusion of the conference playoffs. The San Miguel Beermen and Purefoods Hotdogs, aiming for victory, played for the 39th championship contested by the league.

The San Miguel Beermen repeated as back-to-back champions, denying the Purefoods Hotdogs a first title in its maiden season in the PBA, the Beermen won in a seven-game series by taking the last two games. The best-of-seven finals went the full distance for only the second time in league history.

== Qualification ==
San Miguel		Purefoods
Finished 7–3 (.700), 1st	Eliminations	Finished 6–4 (.600), tied for 2nd
Finished 12–6 (.667), tied for 1st	Semifinals	Finished 12–6 (.667), tied for 1st

== Series scoring summary ==
Team	Game 1	Game 2	Game 3	Game 4	Game 5	Game 6	Game 7	Wins
San Miguel	129	101	88	93	97	105	94	4
Purefoods	116	107	96	88	103	85	92	3
Venue	ULTRA	ULTRA	ULTRA	ULTRA	ULTRA	ULTRA	ULTRA

== Games summary ==
=== Game 1 ===
Vintage

May 26

San Miguel Beermen 129, Purefoods Hotdogs 116
Scoring by quarter: 30–20, 32–27, 24–31, 43–38
Pts: Ricardo Brown 31	Pts: David Thirdkill 40
San Miguel leads series, 1–0

The ULTRA, Pasig

San Miguel took advantage of the Hotdogs' sluggish start and led 27–11 early, the Beermen padded their margin to 23 points at 51–28 in the second quarter and took a 62–47 lead at halftime. Purefoods could only come closer to six points, 80–86, barely a minute into the fourth period.

=== Game 2 ===
Vintage

May 29

San Miguel Beermen 101, Purefoods Hotdogs 107
Pts: Norman Black 32	Pts: David Thirdkill 52
Series tied at 1–1

The ULTRA, Pasig

After allowing the Beermen to score lots of points in the series opener, the Hotdogs put up a tough, defensive stand to limit San Miguel's output. Purefoods led by 18 points at 72–54 in the third quarter but the Beermen reduced their lead to just two in the final period, David Thirdkill came to the rescue and score seven of the Hotdogs' last nine points to seal the victory.

=== Game 3 ===
Vintage

May 31

San Miguel Beermen 88, Purefoods Hotdogs 96
Purefoods leads series, 2–1

The ULTRA, Pasig

Rookie Jojo Lastimosa put on a show as he led Purefoods to a 22–4 blitz that turn an 84–74 San Miguel lead to a 96–88 Purefoods win. Back-to-back triples by Lastimosa and Al Solis pushed the Hotdogs to within four, 80–84. The Beermen were ahead by three points, 88–85, when Purefoods called a timeout and eleven unanswered points by the Hotdogs followed with Lastimosa's three-point play gave them the lead for good at 90–88.

=== Game 4 ===
Vintage

June 2

San Miguel Beermen 93, Purefoods Hotdogs 88
Series tied at 2–2

The ULTRA, Pasig

San Miguel led by 17 points early in the third quarter. But down the stretch was another Purefoods comeback. A three-point play by Jojo Lastimosa tied the count at 84-all. Elmer Reyes sent the Beermen back on top with a lay-up, successive hits by Lastimosa and Jerry Codinera put the Hotdogs out front, 88–86, with just a little over two minutes left in the fourth period. David Thirdkill was saddled with five fouls and had only scored 18 points. San Miguel got a lift on the next play as Abet Guidaben knocked in a 12-footer and drew a foul from Ramon Fernandez. Abet made the free throw for a one-point lead by San Miguel, 89–88. On the next play, Thirdkill muffed a jumper, Guidaben came back with another basket to give the Beermen a three-point margin, 91–88. Again, Purefoods went to Thirdkill for the hit and he failed. With the time down to eight seconds, Hector Calma drove in and got a foul from Al Solis, he converted both of his free throws for a finishing 7–0 run as San Miguel level the series at two games apiece. Playing coach Norman Black outscored Thirdkill, 20–18, for the second time in the playoffs. The Beermen were unable to field Ricardo Brown, who had to sit out the game on his physician's orders.

=== Game 5 ===
Vintage

June 5

San Miguel Beermen 97, Purefoods Hotdogs 103
Pts: Norman Black 29	Pts: David Thirdkill 36
Purefoods leads series, 3–2

The ULTRA, Pasig

Veterans Ramon Fernandez and Abet Guidaben got into several ugly plays early, the Hotdogs were on top by 16 points, 80–64, after three quarters. The Beermen threatened twice in the final period, the last at 94–95 when Jojo Lastimosa banged in a three-point shot and on the next play, Lastimosa sink both his charities to give Purefoods a six-point edge, 100–94.

=== Game 6 ===
Vintage

June 7

San Miguel Beermen 105, Purefoods Hotdogs 85
Pts: Norman Black 42	Pts: David Thirdkill 31
Series tied at 3–3

The ULTRA, Pasig

After a 42-all standoff at halftime, the Beermen outscored the Hotdogs by 17 points in the third quarter for a 77–60 advantage going into the last 12 minutes of play. Purefoods' Al Solis tried to keep the Hotdogs into the thick of the fight with booming triples, including three straight midway in the fourth quarter, San Miguel answered every baskets Purefoods made to force a decisive seventh game.

=== Game 7 ===
Vintage

June 9

San Miguel Beermen 94, Purefoods Hotdogs 92
Scoring by quarter: 25–26, 22–18, 24–26, 23–22
Pts: Norman Black 38 Abet Guidaben 28	Pts: Al Solis 23
San Miguel wins series, 4–3

The ULTRA, Pasig

Before a capacity crowd of more than 12,000 at the ULTRA in the deciding Game 7, San Miguel open the third quarter with six straight points to take the biggest lead for the night at 53–44. The Hotdogs on the heroics of Al Solis keeps coming back, Purefoods last tasted the lead, 73–71, early in the fourth period, an 8–0 blast by the Beermen gave them a six-point edge, 79–73. With the score standing at 88–80 for San Miguel, Al Solis drained his fifth triple that started an 8–2 run for the Hotdogs and trimmed the deficit to two points, 88–90, with only 11 seconds remaining. Purefoods playing coach Ramon Fernandez was called for his sixth and final foul off Ricardo Brown, San Miguel leading, 92–90. Brown converted his two charities to give the Beermen a four-point edge, 94–90.

Showing championship composure, San Miguel eked out a 94–92 win in the seventh and final game of the series. Abet Guidaben had a seventh game with 28 points, Norman Black came up with 38 points and held Purefoods import David Thirdkill to 16 points in the final game, the lowest in his entire playing career in the PBA. Ricardo Brown scored only nine points but his two free throws off the sixth foul of Ramon Fernandez secured the victory for the Beermen. On Purefoods' side, it was Al Solis who emerged as his team's best local scorer with an average of 16.1 points in that seven-game stretch, Solis topscored for the Hotdogs in the seventh game with 23 points, shooting an amazing 71 percent from the three-point range on five-of-seven shooting.

1988 PBA Open Conference Champions

San Miguel Beermen
Fourth title

== Rosters ==
San Miguel Beermen roster
Players

Pos.	#	POB	Name	Height	Weight	DOB (YYYY–MM–DD)	From
F	4	(Philippines)	Elmer Reyes	6 ft 1 in (1.85 m)			San Beda
G	5	(Philippines)	Franz Pumaren	5 ft 9 in (1.75 m)			De La Salle
G	7	(Philippines)	Alfie Almario	6 ft 0 in (1.83 m)			De La Salle
F	10	(Philippines)	Alvin Teng	6 ft 4 in (1.93 m)			Arellano
C	11	(Philippines)	Tonichi Yturri	6 ft 5 in (1.96 m)			De La Salle
F	12	(Philippines)	Yves Dignadice	6 ft 4 in (1.93 m)			STI WNU
G	14	(Philippines)	Hector Calma	5 ft 9 in (1.75 m)			Adamson
F	15	(Philippines)	Ricardo Cui	6 ft 3 in (1.91 m)			Lyceum
F	17	(Philippines)	Jeffrey Graves	6 ft 3 in (1.91 m)			Angeles
G	23	(United States)	Ricardo Brown	5 ft 11 in (1.80 m)			Pepperdine
F/C	24	(United States)	Norman Black (I)	6 ft 5 in (1.96 m)			Saint Joseph's
C	32	(Philippines)	Abet Guidaben	6 ft 5 in (1.96 m)			USJ–R

Coaches

Head coach

- (United States) Norman Black

Assistant coach(es)

- (Philippines) Derrick Pumaren

Legend

- (C) Team captain
- Injured

Purefoods Hotdogs roster
Players

Pos.	#	POB	Name	Height	Weight	DOB (YYYY–MM–DD)	From
G	6	(Philippines)	Jojo Lastimosa	6 ft 1 in (1.85 m)			USJ–R
G	8	(Philippines)	Al Solis	5 ft 11 in (1.80 m)			Visayas
G	9	(Philippines)	Onchie Dela Cruz	5 ft 11 in (1.80 m)			Philippine Christian
F	10	(Philippines)	Freddie Hubalde	6 ft 1 in (1.85 m)			Mapúa
G	12	(Philippines)	Glenn Capacio	6 ft 1 in (1.85 m)			Far Eastern
C	14	(Philippines)	Jack Tanuan	6 ft 6 in (1.98 m)			Far Eastern
F	17	(Philippines)	Padim Israel	6 ft 3 in (1.91 m)			Ateneo
C	19	(Philippines)	Ramon Fernandez	6 ft 4 in (1.93 m)			San Carlos
F/C	22	(United States)	David Thirdkill (I)	6 ft 6 in (1.98 m)			Bradley
F	24	(Philippines)	Jose Yango	6 ft 3 in (1.91 m)			San Beda
G	42	(Philippines)	Willie Generalao	5 ft 8 in (1.73 m)			Visayas
C	44	(Philippines)	Jerry Codiñera	6 ft 5 in (1.96 m)			UE
F	71	(Philippines)	Manuel Marquez	6 ft 2 in (1.88 m)			San Beda

Coaches

Head coach

- (Philippines) Ramon Fernandez

Assistant coach(es)

- (Philippines) Cris Calilan
- (Philippines) Ely Capacio

Legend

- (C) Team captain
- Injured

== Occurrences ==
Just before Game 7, PBA Commissioner Rudy Salud summoned Ramon Fernandez and Abet Guidaben for separate offenses in Games 5 and 6, Fernandez was taken to task for not just blaming the referees but accusing them of favoring Purefoods' opponent- San Miguel Beer, while Guidaben was summoned for his reaction at the endgame elbow thrown at him by Fernandez in Game 6 but also his behavior in Game 5. both were fined by the Commissioner's Office.

== Broadcast notes ==
Game	Play-by-play	Analyst
Game 1		
Game 2		
Game 3	Pinggoy Pengson	Tim Cone
Game 4		
Game 5		
Game 6	Sev Sarmenta	Andy Jao
Game 7	Joe Cantada	Joaqui Trillo
