= List of Philippine Basketball Association career scoring leaders =

This is a list of the top 20 Philippine Basketball Association player statistical leaders by total career points scored.

As of today, Ramon Fernandez still leads the all-time scoring list. James Yap is the leading scorer for active players and is twelfth all-time.

== Scoring leaders ==
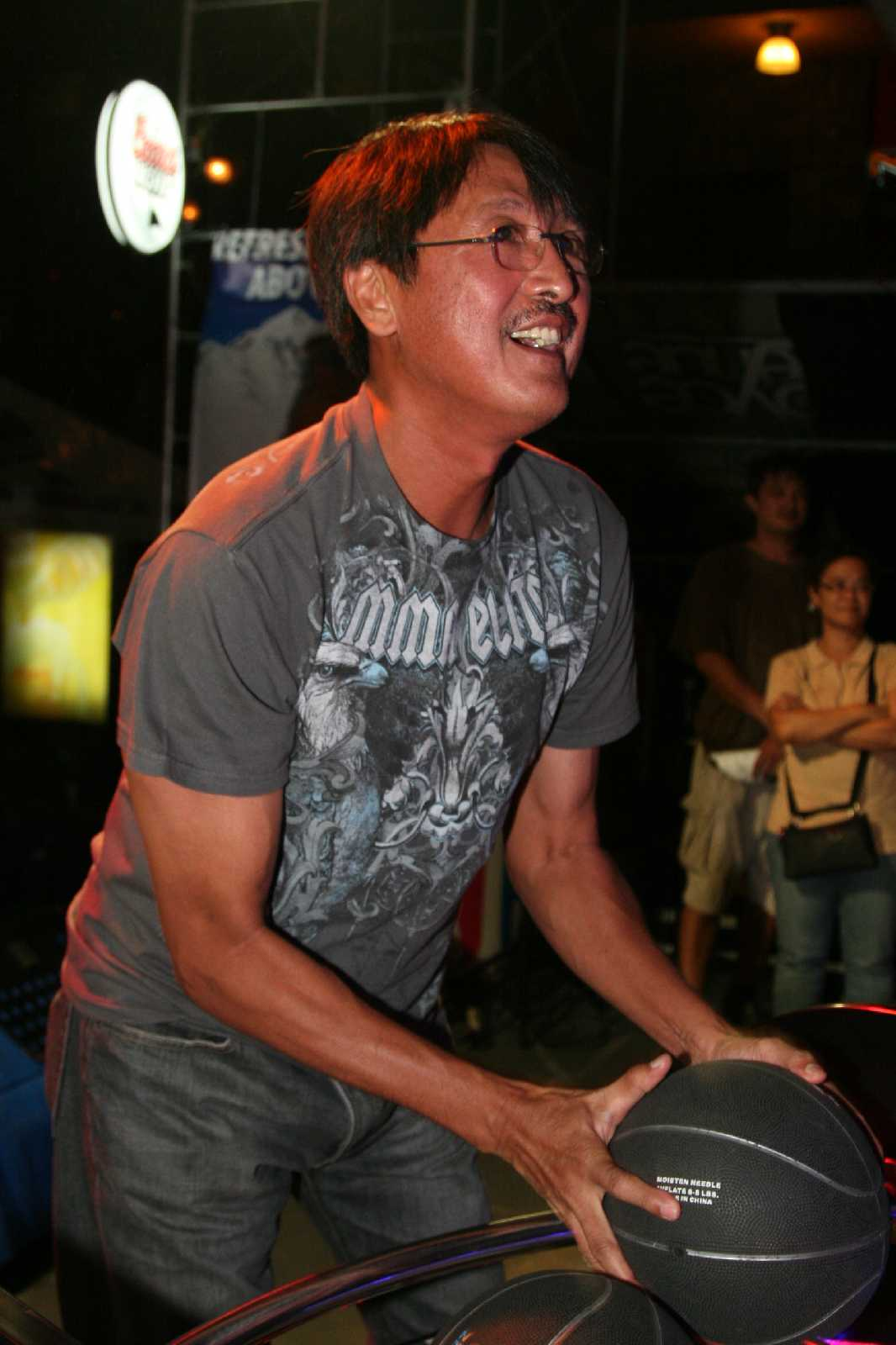
Atoy Co is the fourth all-time career scoring leader of the league.

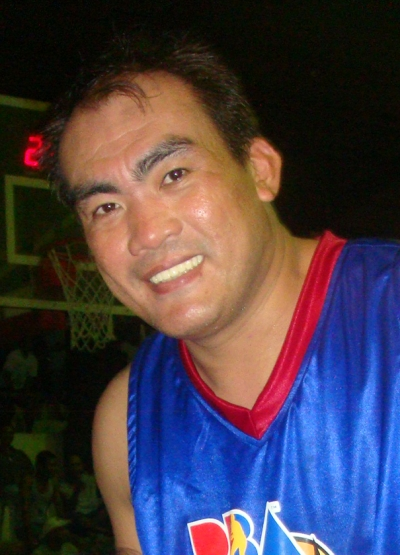
Nelson Asaytono is the fifth all-time career scoring leader of the league.

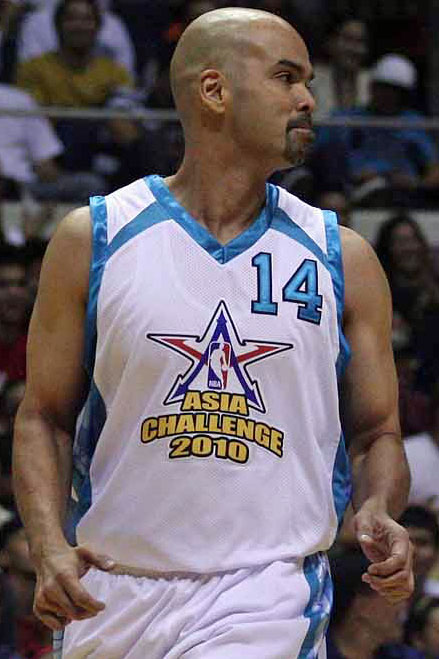
Benjie Paras is the thirteenth all-time career scoring leader of the league.

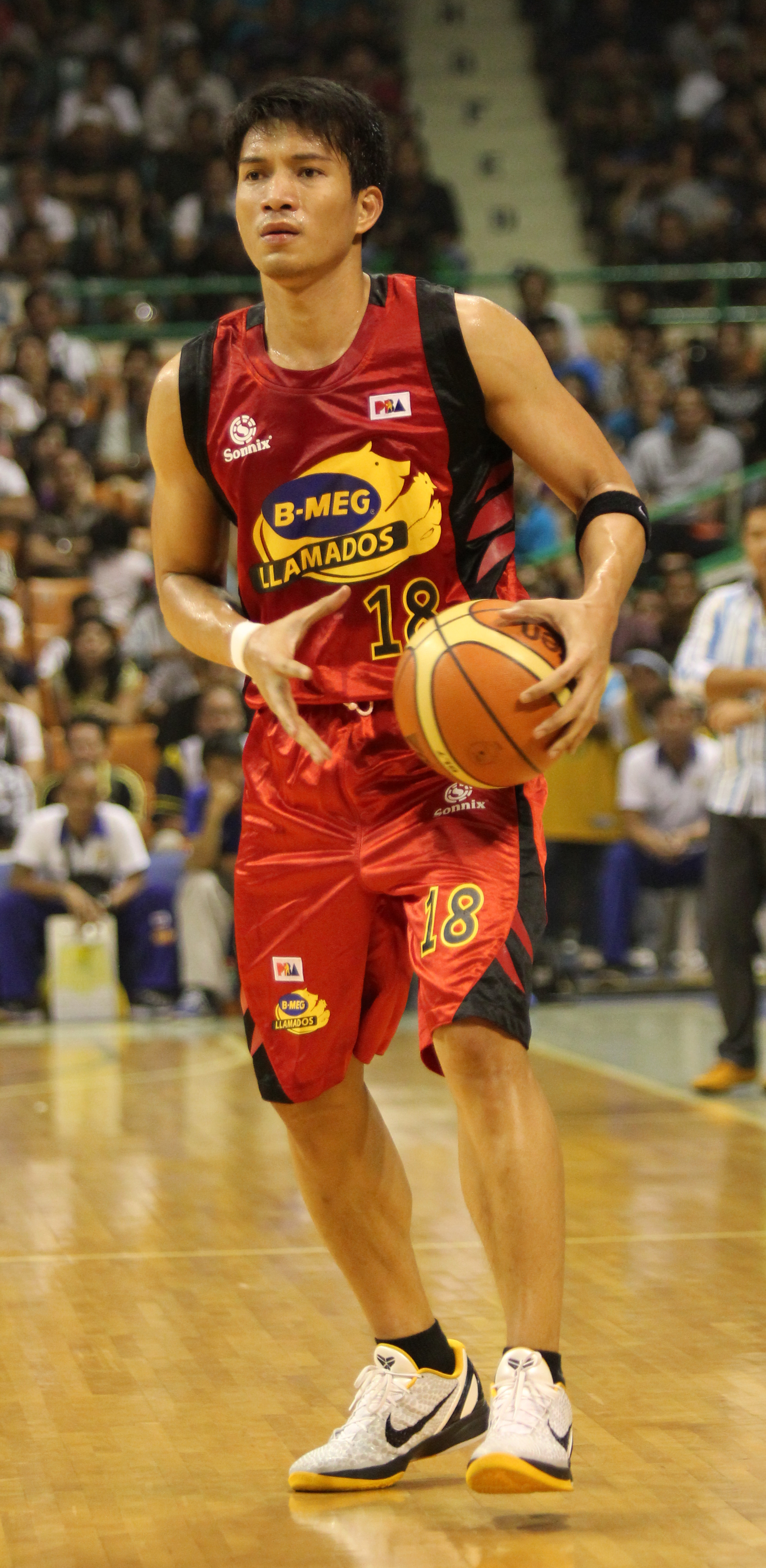
James Yap is the twelfth all-time career scoring leader of the league. Yap also leads the scoring sheet for all active players.

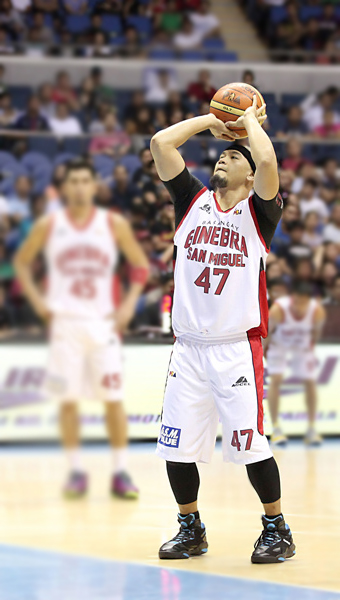
Mark Caguioa is the eighteenth all-time career scoring leader of the league.

Statistics accurate as of December 14, 2022

Italics	Active PBA player
*	Inducted into the PBA Hall of Fame or named as one of the 40 Greatest Players in PBA History.

Rank	Player	Position(s)	Team(s) played for (years)	Total points	Games played	Points per game average
1	Ramon Fernandez*	C/PF	Toyota (1975–1984); Beer Hausen/Manila Beer (1984–1985); Tanduay (1985–1987); Purefoods (1988); San Miguel (1988–1994)	18,996	1,074	17.7
2	Abet Guidaben*	C/PF	Crispa/Walk Tall (1975–1984); Tanduay (1985); Manila Beer (1986); Magnolia/San Miguel (1987–1988); Purefoods (1988); Alaska (1989); Pepsi/7–Up (1990–1993); Shell (1994–1995)	15,775	1,081	14.6
3	Alvin Patrimonio*	PF/SF	Purefoods/Coney Island (1988–2004)	15,091	857	17.6
4	Atoy Co*	SG	Crispa/Walk Tall (1975–1984); Manila Beer (1985–1986); Great Taste/Presto (1987–1988)	12,994	749	17.4
5	Nelson Asaytono	PF/SF	Purefoods (1989–1991); Swift/Sunkist (1992–1996); San Miguel (1996–1999); Pop Cola (2000–2001); Red Bull (2002–2006)	12,668	820	15.0
6	Philip Cezar*	PF/C	Crispa/Walk Tall (1975–1984); Shell (1985–1986); Great Taste/Presto (1987–1988); Añejo Rum/Ginebra (1989–1991)	12,077	918	13.1
7	Jojo Lastimosa*	SG	Purefoods (1988–1991); Alaska (1991–2000, 2002–2003); Pop Cola (2000–2002)	12,008	789	15.2
8	Bogs Adornado*	SF	Crispa/Walk Tall (1975–1979); U/Tex (1980–1982); Great Taste (1983–1984); Shell (1985–1986); Hills Bros. (1987)	11,967	586	20.4
9	Robert Jaworski*	PG	Toyota (1975–1984); Ginebra/Añejo Rum/Tondeña 65/Gordon's Gin (1984–1998)	11,760	958	12.3
10	Allan Caidic*	SG	Northern Consolidated Cement (1984–1985); Great Taste/Presto (1987–1992); San Miguel (1993–1998); Barangay Ginebra (1999)	11,719	598	19.6
11	Norman Black^{~}	PF/SF	Tefilin, San Miguel/Magnolia, Great Taste, Alaska, Pop Cola	11,329	282	40.2
12	James Yap*	SG/SF	Purefoods/B-Meg Derby Ace/B-Meg/San Mig Coffee/San Mig Super Coffee/Star (2004–2016); Rain or Shine (2016–2024); Blackwater Bossing (2024-present)	10,978	734	14.9
13	Jerry Codiñera*	C	Purefoods/Coney Island (1988–1999); Mobiline/Talk 'N Text (1999–2002); FedEx (2002–2005)	10,868	871	12.5
14	Benjie Paras*	C/PF	Shell (1989–2002); San Miguel (2002–2003)	10,322	586	17.7
15	Francis Arnaiz*	SG/PG	Toyota (1975–1983); Ginebra (1984–1986)	10,292	613	16.8
16	Arwind Santos*	PF/SF	Air21/Burger King (2006–2009); San Miguel/Petron (2009–2021); NorthPort (2021–present)	10,120	720	13.9
17	Mark Caguioa*	SG	Barangay Ginebra (2001–2020)	10,075	744	13.5
18	Freddie Hubalde*	SF/SG	Crispa/Walk Tall (1975–1984); Tanduay (1985–1987); Purefoods (1988); Shell (1988–1989); Añejo Rum (1990)	9,927	793	12.5
19	Manny Victorino	PF/C	Presto/Great Taste/N-Rich (1981–1986); Shell (1987–1988); Presto (1989–1990); Pepsi/7-Up (1991–1992); Ginebra (1993); Purefoods (1994–1995); Sunkist (1996)	9,596	727	13.2
20	Vergel Meneses*	SF/SG	Presto (1992); Sta. Lucia (1993); Swift/Sunkist/Pop Cola (1993–1999); Barangay Ginebra (1999–2002); FedEx (2002–2004); Red Bull (2004–2005); Talk N' Text (2006)	9,453	590	16.0
21	Arnie Tuadles	SF	Toyota (1979–1983); Great Taste (1984, 1987–1988); Ginebra (1985); Alaska (1986); Shell (1989–1990); Presto (1990–1992)	9,430	692	13.6
