= 1988 PBA/IBA World Challenge Cup =

1988 PBA PBA/IBA Cup
- Duration: September 18–25, 1988
- TV partner(s): Vintage Sports (PTV)

Finals
- Champions: Añejo Rum 65ers
- Runners-up: Alaska Milkmen

PBA PBA/IBA Cup chronology
- < 1987

PBA conference chronology
- < 1988 All-Filipino 1988 Reinforced >

The 1988 Coca-Cola PBA/IBA World Challenge Cup was the 2nd staging of the PBA/IBA series hosted by the Philippine Basketball Association (PBA) and the International Basketball Association. The one-week event took place on September 18–25.

== Tournament details ==
Two PBA basketball clubs; All-Filipino Conference champion Añejo Rum 65ers and All-Filipino Conference third placer Alaska Milkmen were joined by the IBA representative, Los Angeles Jaguars, coached by Paul Howards, and the Australian selection, Aussie All-Stars, coached by Ken Cole. Among those playing for the Jaguars were Sean Chambers, 6'2" NBA veteran Rudy White, Tran Sawyer, Quintin Stephens. The Australian All-star team had two Americans, Jerry Everett and Rick Sharp, although a third American scheduled to play, Mark Davis was unable to make the trip. The 65ers played with only one import, Bobby Parks, borrowed from Shell, while the Milkmen were reinforced by Willie Bland and Eddie Cox.

== Results ==
Vintage

September 18

boxscores

Añejo Rum 65ers 121, Aussie All-Stars 105

The ULTRA, Pasig

Vintage

September 18

Alaska Milkmen 135, Los Angeles Jaguars 118

The ULTRA, Pasig

Vintage

September 20

boxscores

Aussie All-Stars 134, Alaska Milkmen 132

The ULTRA, Pasig

Vintage

September 20

Añejo Rum 65ers 116, Los Angeles Jaguars 113

The ULTRA, Pasig

Vintage

September 22

boxscores

Los Angeles Jaguars 115, Aussie All-Stars 110

The ULTRA, Pasig

Vintage

September 22

Alaska Milkmen 126, Añejo Rum 65ers 113

The ULTRA, Pasig

== Battle for third place ==
Vintage

September 25

Los Angeles Jaguars 129, Aussie All-Stars 123
Scoring by quarter: 32-31, 28-29, 30-36, 39-27

The ULTRA, Pasig

== Finals ==
Vintage

September 25

Añejo Rum 65ers 128, Alaska Milkmen 126
Scoring by quarter: 36-23, 35-30, 28-46, 29-27
Pts: Bobby Parks 59	Pts: Willie Bland 44

The ULTRA, Pasig

Romulo Mamaril came from nowhere to deliver the winning basket, struck with a lay-up in the last three seconds that shattered the 126-all deadlock and power Añejo to a 128-126 triumph over Alaska for the PBA/IBA championship. The Rum Masters led by 14 points in the third quarter but Alaska's Willie Bland rallied the Airmen back to tie the count at 97-all, a seesaw battle ensued in the final six minutes before Mamaril came through with his heroics. Añejo's Bobby Parks was named Most Valuable Player of the 2nd PBA/IBA Cup.

== Philips Sardines Slam Dunk competition ==
- Champion: Willie Bland of Alaska (144 points)
- Runner-up: Sean Chambers of LA Jaguars (133 points)
- Third place: Eddie Cox of Alaska (122 points)
