= 1988 Añejo Rum 65ers season =

- Head coach: Robert Jaworski
- General manager: Bernabe Navarro
- Owners: La Tondeña Distillers, Inc.

Open Conference results
- Record: 12–11 (52.2%)
- Place: 4th
- Playoff finish: Semifinals

All-Filipino Conference results
- Record: 16–9 (64%)
- Place: 1st
- Playoff finish: Champions (def.Purefoods, 3-1)

Reinforced Conference results
- Record: 12–10 (54.5%)
- Place: 3rd
- Playoff finish: Semifinals

Añejo Rum 65ers seasons

The 1988 Añejo Rum 65ers season was the 10th season of the franchise in the Philippine Basketball Association (PBA). Formerly known as Ginebra San Miguel in the Open Conference.

== Transactions ==
Players Added	Signed	Former team
Romulo Mamaril ^{Re-acquired}	Off-season	Tanduay (disbanded)
Cayetano Salazar	Off-season	Tanduay (disbanded)

== Championships ==
On September 13, 1988, Game four of the All-Filipino Conference finals between Añejo Rum 65 and Purefoods Hotdogs with the Rum Masters leading the best-of-five series, two games to one, they came back from 19 points down in the third quarter and forces overtime at 119-all on playing-coach Sonny Jaworski's game-tying basket with two seconds to go in regulation, a 16-5 windup in the extension period gave the Rum Masters their second PBA title and became the fifth team to win the All-Filipino diadem.

Añejo Rum won the one-week PBA/IBA World Challenge Cup, with Bobby Parks, on loan from Shell, as their import. The Rum Masters defeated Alaska Milkmen in the one-game finale, 128-126.

== Awards ==
- Jamie Waller was voted Best Import of the Open Conference.
- By the end of the year, Añejo playing coach Robert Jaworski was honored by the Philippine Sportswriters Association (PSA) as Pro basketball player of the year. The Big J was voted as Most Outstanding Player during the All-Filipino Conference finals series.

== Notable dates ==
March 24: Ginebra scored their first win of the season, winning over San Miguel Beermen, 118–113, import Jamie Waller tallied 55 points.

April 17: Ginebra repeated over their sister team San Miguel, 115-104, behind a 17–5 blast in the last five minutes of the ballgame in their most impressive win in the conference against the team that beat them in 17 out of 20 meetings last season.

April 24: Jamie Waller scored 57 points as Ginebra got back at their arch-rival Purefoods Hotdogs in the second round of eliminations via 127-122 win, playing-coach Sonny Jaworski was chosen best player of the game. It was the fifth straight victory by Ginebra as they raised their standings to six wins and three losses.

May 12: Ginebra defeated San Miguel Beermen for the fourth time in the conference, 114-108, a 6-0 windup in the final two minutes with Sonny Jaworski stealing the ball from Hector Calma from a San Miguel inbound and converted on a lay-up that broke the 108-all deadlock.

August 4: Sonny Jaworski's buzzer-beating follow-up lifted Añejo to a 115-113 win over Great Taste and clinched the fifth and last semifinals berth. The Big J came from nowhere to grab an offensive rebound and a winning basket off Philip Cezar and Abe King after Joey Loyzaga's jumper and Dondon Ampalayo's follow up both rimmed out.

September 4: Trailing by 11 points at the start of the fourth quarter of their playoff game against San Miguel for the right to face Purefoods in the finals, the Rum Masters banked on Romulo Mamaril's buzzer-beating basket off a feed from Joey Loyzaga in the last five seconds (described by the Big J as "God's play") to repulse the Beermen, 102-100, and arrange a dream finals match with the Purefoods Hotdogs.

October 30: Añejo Rum formally enters the semifinal round in the Reinforced Conference and ended Purefoods' amazing run in their very first season, along with Abet Guidaben's hopes for a back-to-back MVP award, in a 157-150 overtime victory. Imports Joe Ward and Tommy Davis scored 63 and 59 points respectively for a combined output of 122 points.

December 11: As the season comes to a close, Game four of the battle for third place between Añejo and Presto had another free-for-all and bench-clearing incident, following import Tommy Davis' hard foul on Philip Cezar in the third quarter, cooler heads intervened after. The Rum Masters prevailed, 171-145, for a 3-1 series win, a total of nine players were fined for that melee, with the stiffest fine on both Añejo imports Tommy Davis and Joe Ward.

== Occurrences ==
On July 26, Añejo lost a won-ballgame against San Miguel Beermen, with five seconds left and the 65ers leading, 103-102, Abet Guidaben almost fumbled the ball but threw a bank shot with one second left as the Beermen won the game, 104-103, for their first win in the season over their sister team after losing five straight. It was later discovered that a scoring error occurred late in the first quarter crediting two points for the Beermen. The Commissioners' office turned down the Añejo protest.

On the second playing day of the semifinals in the All-Filipino Conference on August 14, the Añejo Rum 65ers and Great Taste Milkmasters figured in a basketbrawl involving Sonny Cabatu, Dennis Abbatuan and Abe King of Great Taste and Dante Gonzalgo of Añejo, who crashed into a seated Dennis Abbatuan on the Great taste' bench while going for the loose ball and became a target of ire by the Great Taste players with seconds remaining before halftime and the Milkmasters up, 58-43. The 65ers were down by 17 points at the start of the fourth period but rallied to win, 111-104. Emotions ran so high after the game where Great Taste' shooting forward Allan Caidic beat up a basketball fan from the stands.

Billy Ray Bates played his last PBA game on October 13, sitting on the bench for most of the minutes and scoring a miserable 16 points as Añejo bowed to Presto Ice Cream, 105-122. On that night, brownouts hit the nation and the whole parts of Metro Manila were covered with darkness and that game was neither televised or shown on TV.

On the morning of October 16, Open Conference best import Jamie Waller arrived as one of the two replacement imports for Billy Ray Bates and Kevin Gamble. However, a note from the NBA expansion team Miami Heat on a $200,000 guaranteed one-year contract waited for him at the airport. Waller decided to return home. Kevin Gamble, who was on his way out, suited up for his last game later that evening against Shell Rimula-X, together with new Anejo import Tommy Davis.

== Won-loss records vs Opponents ==
Team	Win	Loss	1st (Open)	2nd (All-Filipino)	3rd (Reinforced)
Alaska	7	10	3-6	2-2	2-2
Great Taste / Presto	9	7	1-3	3-1	5-3
Purefoods	9	5	2-2	5-3	2-0
San Miguel	8	5	4-0	3-2	1-3
Shell	5	3	2-0	1-1	2-2
RP Team	2	0	N/A	2-0	N/A
Total	40	30	12-11	16-9	12-10

== Roster ==
1988 Añejo Rum 65ers roster
Players

Pos.	#	POB	Name	Height	Weight	DOB (YYYY–MM–DD)	From
G	5	(Philippines)	Mukesh Advani	5 ft 11 in (1.80 m)			San Beda
F	6	(Philippines)	Dondon Ampalayo	6 ft 3 in (1.91 m)			USJ–R
G	7	(Philippines)	Robert Jaworski	6 ft 1 in (1.85 m)			UE
G	9	(Philippines)	Leo Isaac	6 ft 1 in (1.85 m)			Mapúa
C	10	(Philippines)	Eduardo Ducut	6 ft 5 in (1.96 m)			Letran
F	11	(Philippines)	Zaldy Latoza	6 ft 1 in (1.85 m)			Trinity
F	12	(Philippines)	Dante Gonzalgo	6 ft 2 in (1.88 m)			Lyceum
F	13	(Philippines)	Harmon Codiñera	6 ft 4 in (1.93 m)			Far Eastern
G	14	(Philippines)	Joey Loyzaga	6 ft 0 in (1.83 m)			San Beda
G	17	(Philippines)	Rudy Distrito	5 ft 11 in (1.80 m)			UE
F	18	(Philippines)	Dennis Carbonilla	6 ft 3 in (1.91 m)			Letran
C	22	(Philippines)	Romulo Mamaril	6 ft 6 in (1.98 m)			Mapúa
C	30	(Philippines)	Cayetano Salazar	6 ft 5 in (1.96 m)			Letran
F	41	(Philippines)	Chito Loyzaga	6 ft 2 in (1.88 m)			San Beda

Coaches

Head coach

- (Philippines) Robert Jaworski

Assistant coach(es)

- (Philippines) Rino Salazar

Team manager

- (Philippines) Bernabe Navarro

Legend

- (C) Team captain
- Injured

=== Imports ===
Name	Conference	No.	Pos.	Ht.	College
Jamie Waller	Open Conference	25	Forward	6'4"	Virginia Union University
Billy Ray Bates ^{played four games}	Reinforced Conference	2	Guard-Forward	6'3"	Kentucky State University
Kevin Gamble ^{played five games}	Reinforced Conference	35	Forward	6'4"	University of Iowa
Tommy Davis ^{replaces Billy Ray Bates}	Reinforced Conference	34	Forward-Guard	6'3"	University of Minnesota
Joe Ward ^{replaces Kevin Gamble}	Reinforced Conference	32	Forward-Center	6'4"	University of Georgia
