= List of Philippine Basketball Association retired numbers =

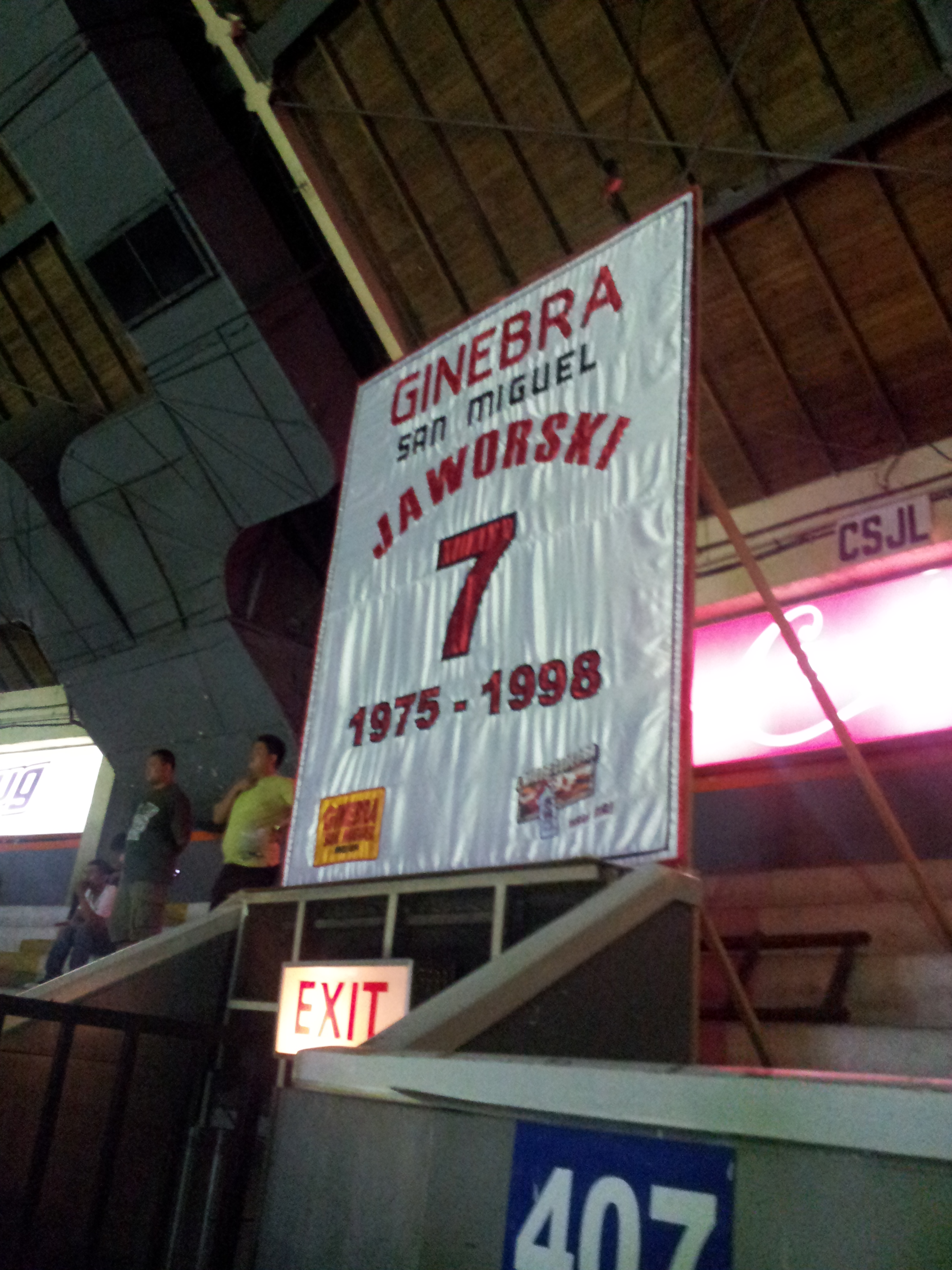
Robert Jaworski's retired jersey banner at the rafters of the Smart Araneta Coliseum during his retirement ceremonies in 2012.

Teams in the Philippine Basketball Association retire the jersey numbers of players who are attributed to the team's success. They are usually no longer available for future players to wear. Since there are no home arenas, numbers are rarely hung in arenas and, more often, teams award players with a framed jersey during the retirement ceremony.

As of 2026, seven of the twelve active teams have retired numbers. The San Miguel Beermen and the defunct Alaska Aces have retired seven numbers each, though three numbers from the former are not officially retired.

Two players have their numbers retired by multiple teams: Allan Caidic for Barangay Ginebra San Miguel and San Miguel Beermen, and Jeffrey Cariaso for Alaska and the Powerade Tigers.

== List ==
=== Active teams ===
Elected to the PBA Hall of Fame

Number	Name	Team	Position	Years with franchise	Year retired	Note	Refs
7	Robert Jaworski	Barangay Ginebra San Miguel	G	1984–1998	2012	Also served as playing coach (1985–1998)	
8	Allan Caidic	Barangay Ginebra San Miguel	G	1998–1999	2000	Also served as head coach (2000–2003)	
11	Gilbert Bulawan	Blackwater Bossing	F/C	2014–2016	2016	Died while still playing for the team; number retired posthumously.	
7	Rey Evangelista	Magnolia Chicken Timplados Hotshots	F	1994–2009	2014		
8	Peter June Simon	Magnolia Chicken Timplados Hotshots	G	2004–2020	2021		
15	Marc Pingris	Magnolia Chicken Timplados Hotshots	F	2005–2008, 2009–2019	2021		
16	Alvin Patrimonio	Magnolia Chicken Timplados Hotshots	F	1988–2004	2004	Currently serves as team manager	
44	Jerry Codiñera	Magnolia Chicken Timplados Hotshots	C	1988–1999	2014		
88	Asi Taulava	NLEX Road Warriors	C	2014–2023	2023	Jersey number retired during Taulava's final PBA game	
5	Gabe Norwood	Rain or Shine Elasto Painters	F	2008–2025	2026		
8	Allan Caidic	San Miguel Beermen	G	1993–1998	2000		
9	Samboy Lim	San Miguel Beermen	G	1987–1997	n/a	Unofficially retired	
12	Yves Dignadice	San Miguel Beermen	F	1987–1997	n/a	Unofficially retired	
14	Hector Calma	San Miguel Beermen	G	1986–1994	n/a	Unofficially retired	
17	Olsen Racela	San Miguel Beermen	G	1997–2011	2011		
19	Ramon Fernandez	San Miguel Beermen	C	1988–1994	1995		
29	Arwind Santos	San Miguel Beermen	F	2009–2021	2024		
3	Jimmy Alapag	TNT Tropang 5G	G	2003–2015	2015	Also served as team manager (2015)	
4	Harvey Carey	TNT Tropang 5G	F	2003–2020	2023	Retired during a preseason "PBA on Tour" game	
33	Ranidel de Ocampo	TNT Tropang 5G	F	2008–2017	2026	Also serves as an assistant coach for the team during jersey retirement	

=== Defunct teams ===
Elected to the PBA Hall of Fame

Number	Name	Team	Position	Years with franchise	Year retired	Note	Refs
18	Vergel Meneses	Air21 Express	G	2002–2004	2013	Meneses wore #18 during his stint for the Swift/Sunkist/Pop Cola franchise from 1993 to 1999. He played for the old FedEx/Air21 franchise (known as the Barako Bull Energy during the jersey retirement), wearing jersey #8. The team was sold in 2014.	
6	Jojo Lastimosa	Alaska Aces	G	1991–1999, 2002–2003	2003	The team was sold in 2022.	
7	Sonny Thoss	Alaska Aces	C	2004–2019	2022	The team was sold in 2022.	
14	Johnny Abarrientos	Alaska Aces	G	1993–2000	2011	The team was sold in 2022.	
16	Bong Hawkins	Alaska Aces	F	1993–2000, 2005–2006	2011	The team was sold in 2022.	
20	Sean Chambers	Alaska Aces	G	1989–2001	2001	Played for Alaska during the import-laden conferences. The team was sold in 2022.	
22	Jeffrey Cariaso	Alaska Aces	G	1995–1997, 2004–2010	2010	The team was sold in 2022.	
33	Bogs Adornado	Alaska Aces	F	1987	1988	Also served as head coach (1988–1989). The team was sold in 2022.	
19	Kenneth Duremdes	Powerade Tigers	G	2007–2008	2012	The team was sold in 2012.	
22	Jeffrey Cariaso	Powerade Tigers	G	2002–2004	2010	The team was sold in 2012.	
14	Benjie Paras	Shell Turbo Chargers	C	1989–2001	2001	The team was sold in 2005.	
