= 1988 Alaska Milkmen season =

- Head coach: Arturo Valenzona; Bogs Adornado (Reinforced Conference)
- General manager: Joel Aquino
- Owner: Holland Milk Products, Inc.

Open Conference results
- Record: 12–11 (52.2%)
- Place: 3rd
- Playoff finish: Semifinals

All-Filipino Conference results
- Record: 12–11 (52.2%)
- Place: 3rd
- Playoff finish: Semifinals

Reinforced Conference results
- Record: 6–12 (33.3%)
- Place: 5th
- Playoff finish: Semifinals

Alaska Milkmen seasons

The 1988 Alaska Milkmen season was the 3rd season of the franchise in the Philippine Basketball Association (PBA).

== Transactions ==
Players Added	Signed	Former team
Adriano Polistico ^{Rookie}	Off-season	N/A
Rey Lazaro	Off-season	Shell
Willie Pearson	Off-season	Shell
Biboy Ravanes	Off-season	Shell

== Notable dates ==
March 22: Alaska Milkmen came back from 11 points down early in the fourth quarter and lean on the charities of import Andrew Kennedy, who scored 50 points, in the closing seconds to eked out a 124–119 win over Ginebra San Miguel in both teams' first game of the season.

April 28: On the final playing date of the elimination round in the Open Conference, Alaska rout Shell Helix, 147–119, as import Andrew Kennedy scored a conference-high 73 points.

July 14: Yoyoy Villamin scored a career-high 44 points as Alaska beats Great Taste, 135–122 in overtime. The Airmen now share top spot with San Miguel and Great Taste, which absorbed their second straight loss, with a 4-2 won-loss slate.

October 4: Willie Bland scored 65 points to lead Alaska to a 136–131 win over Añejo Rum 65, giving new head coach Bogs Adornado his first win, the Rum Masters got 36 points each from their imports Billy Ray Bates and Kevin Gamble.

October 13: After back-to-back losses to Presto and Shell, the Airmen came back with a 128–116 win over unbeaten San Miguel Beermen, which suffered its first setback in four games.

October 20: Willie Bland scored 49 points while new import David Boone, who replaces Eddie Cox, added 28 markers as Alaska scored their fourth win in six games in the Reinforced Conference, winning over Shell, 134–115.

== Occurrences ==
On March 20, during the opening ceremonies of the league's 14th season, the PBA honors three-time MVP William "Bogs" Adornado, giving him a plaque of recognition, as one of the only few remaining pioneers in the league. Adornado announces his retirement from active playing at age 36, he last played for Hills Bros (now Alaska) in the previous season.

Coach Arturo Valenzona resigned from the team a few days after Alaska lost to All-Filipino champion Añejo Rum in the finale of the one-week PBA/IBA Challenge Cup, replacing him from the bench beginning the Third Conference is assistant coach William "Bogs" Adornado.

During the Third Conference, Alaska raced to four wins and two losses, but towards the end of the elimination round, the Airmen lost their last two matches for an even five victories against five defeats. After dropping their first two outings in the semifinals for a four-game losing streak, the last one where import Willie Bland made a crucial error in the closing seconds of Alaska's 106–111 loss to Presto on November 15 put to rest the suspicions that something smells "fishy", the Alaska management went to look into import Willie Bland's controversial plays in the closing minutes wherein the team lost, it was found out Bland was involved in game-fixing, PBA Commissioner Rudy Salud reviewed the tapes and sought assistance of the NBI and CIS to look into suspected game-fixers and Bland was under surveillance and was seen talking to shady characters prior to Alaska's next game, Willie Bland was allowed to slip the country and no case was filed.

== Won-loss records vs Opponents ==
Team	Win	Loss	1st (Open)	2nd (All-Filipino)	3rd (Reinforced)
Ginebra / Anejo	10	7	6-3	2-2	2-2
Great Taste / Presto	6	6	3-1	2-2	1-3
Purefoods	2	8	0-4	1-3	1-1
San Miguel	6	9	1-3	4-3	1-3
Shell	4	4	2-0	1-1	1-3
RP Team	2	0	N/A	2-0	N/A
Total	30	34	12-11	12-11	6-12

== Roster ==
1988 Alaska Milkmen roster
Players

Pos.	#	POB	Name	Height	Weight	DOB (YYYY–MM–DD)	From
F	2	(Philippines)	Alejo Alolor	6 ft 1 in (1.85 m)			Visayas
F	3	(United States)	Willie Pearson	6 ft 0 in (1.83 m)			Chaminade
G	4	(Philippines)	Frankie Lim	5 ft 11 in (1.80 m)			San Beda
G	6	(Philippines)	Biboy Ravanes	6 ft 0 in (1.83 m)			Cebu
G	7	(Philippines)	Marte Saldaña	5 ft 11 in (1.80 m)			Far Eastern
F	9	(Philippines)	Ludovico Valenciano	6 ft 1 in (1.85 m)			USLS
C	10	(Philippines)	Adriano Polistico	6 ft 7 in (2.01 m)			Letran
F	12	(Philippines)	Rey Lazaro	6 ft 2 in (1.88 m)			Far Eastern
F	13	(Philippines)	Elpidio Villamin	6 ft 3 in (1.91 m)
F	15	(Philippines)	Ricardo Relosa	6 ft 3 in (1.91 m)			Mapúa
F	17	(Philippines)	Antero Saldaña	6 ft 3 in (1.91 m)			Letran
G	32	(Philippines)	Timoteo Coloso	6 ft 2 in (1.88 m)			Letran

Coaches

Head coach

- (Philippines) Arturo Valenzona
- (Philippines) Bogs Adornado

Assistant coach(es)

- (Philippines) Cholo Martin

Team manager

- (Philippines) Joel Aquino

Legend

- (C) Team captain
- Injured

=== Additions ===
Player	Signed	Former team
Terry Saldana	June 1988	Ginebra

=== Subtractions ===
Player	Signed	New team
Dennis Abbatuan	June 1988	Great Taste

=== Imports ===
Name	Conference	No.	Pos.	Ht.	College
Andrew Kennedy	Open Conference	25	Center-Forward	6"6'	University of Virginia
Willie Bland	Reinforced Conference	31	Forward	6"3'	Louisiana Tech University
Eddie Cox ^{played five games}	Reinforced Conference	20	Forward	6"2'	University of North Dakota
David Boone ^{replaces Eddie Cox}	Reinforced Conference	25	Center	6"4'	Marquette University
