= 1988 Presto Ice Cream Makers season =

- Head coach: Baby Dalupan
- General manager: Ignacio Gotao
- Owner: CFC Corporation

Open Conference results
- Record: 6–12 (33.3%)
- Place: 5th
- Playoff finish: Semifinals

All-Filipino Conference results
- Record: 9–11 (45%)
- Place: 5th
- Playoff finish: Semifinals

Reinforced Conference results
- Record: 11–11 (50%)
- Place: 4th
- Playoff finish: Semifinals

Presto Ice Cream Makers seasons

The 1988 Presto Ice Cream Makers season was the 14th season of the franchise in the Philippine Basketball Association (PBA). Formerly known as Great Taste Milkmasters in the first two conferences.

== Transactions ==
Players Added	Signed	Former team
Pido Jarencio	Off-season	San Miguel Beer
Sonny Cabatu	Off-season	Shell
Arturo Cristobal	Off-season	Shell

== Notable dates ==
March 20: Great Taste Instant Milk showed up without an import but its local crew was enough to roll back Shell Helix, 132-113, in the opening game of the season. The PBA found the Milkmasters import Charles Davis too tall for the 6-6 ceiling for imports and was forced to return home.

June 30: Pido Jarencio banged in a buzzer-beating side jumper to lift Great Taste to a 102-100 victory over Purefoods Hotdogs. The Milkmasters squandered a 19-point spread, 89-70, as the Hotdogs starring the debuting Alvin Patrimonio and Jojo Lastimosa clawed back to level at 100-all with 18 seconds left.

July 7: Great Taste scored a 125-121 win over Añejo Rum 65 for a fourth straight triumph in the All-Filipino Conference and remain unbeaten and on top of the standings. Allan Caidic scored 15 of his 34 points in the final quarter while Philip Cezar and Atoy Co provided the defensive gems to frustrate the Rum Masters comeback.

August 23: Allan Caidic fired a season high of 49 points and buried nine triples to power Great Taste to a 143-114 win over Alaska Milk in the second round of the All-Filipino Conference semifinals.

October 20: Import George Almones scored 45 points to lead Presto to a 143-130 win over Añejo Rum, spoiling the debut of Rum Masters import Joe Ward, who scored 55 points. The Ice Cream Makers improved to four wins and two losses while Añejo dropped to one win and five losses. Almones played his last game in the PBA and was replaced by Tony White in Presto's next game.

== Occurrences ==
During the first round of eliminations match between Great Taste and Ginebra on April 7, a near-fight took place with less than a minute left in a close game when Milk Masters' Reynaldo Ramos threw a sneaky punch on Ginebra import Jamie Waller's face, apparently in retaliation for what Waller did to his teammate Pido Jarencio, whose head was bumped by Waller on the floor during the battle for the loose ball.

Coach Baby Dalupan was suspended by Commissioner Rudy Salud for one game for throwing into towel and deliberately lose their April 21 match against Alaska.

Great Taste import Kenny Fields left the team without notice at the start of the second round of the semifinals in the Open Conference. The Milk Masters, which split their first four games in the semifinals, lost a chance for a playoff berth and played their last four games without an import.

Forward Abe King returned to the team and played his first game of the season during the All-Filipino Conference, leading Great Taste to a 112-108 win over Alaska on July 28.

With one week left before the start of the semifinal round of the All-Filipino Conference, point guard Bernie Fabiosa dislocated his shoulder in a rough, physical play during the second half of the game between Great Taste and Añejo on August 4, won by the Rum Masters on Robert Jaworski's buzzer-beating follow-up, Fabiosa's injury put him out for the rest of the season.

During the Milkmasters' second outing in the semifinal round against Añejo Rum 65 on August 14, a brawl ensued in the Great Taste' bench late in the second quarter when Añejo's Dante Gonzalgo crashed into a seated Dennis Abbatuan and was on the receiving end of the blows dealt by Great Taste players Dennis Abbatuan, Abe King and Sonny Cabatu. The Milkmasters, which led by as many as 17 points and were up, 92-77, at the start of the final period, lost the game, 104-111, on a big, fourth quarter rally by the Rum Masters. Triggerman Allan Caidic went up to the stands after the game and mauled a heckler/Añejo fan, Caidic was not able to participate in the three-point shootout contest and was fined and suspended for one game by the Great Taste management for that mauling incident.

On the last playing date of the semifinal round in the All-Filipino Conference on September 1, the Milkmasters were already out of contention from the finals race and they almost turn into a spoiler's role in San Miguel Beermen's quest for a playoff for the second finals berth. There was no time left and the score tied at 126 when Sonny Cabatu was fouled, sending him to the free throw line, a dejected beermen coach Norman Black was headed for exits when Cabatu missed his two charities and the game went into overtime. San Miguel escaped with a 138-137 win in the extension period.

On December 11, the season's rivalry of the year comes to a close in Game four of the battle for third place between the now Presto Ice Cream (formerly Great Taste) and Añejo Rum 65, a free-for-all erupted in the third quarter when Añejo import Tommy Davis committed a dangerous foul on Philip Cezar, who crashed to the floor when Davis pulled his left shoulder, everything seems to be in order until Joe Ward confronted Cezar and Sonny Cabatu grabbed Ward's neck and hell broke lose after that with players from both squads joining in, including Atoy Co, who was in street clothes. the melee spilled all over the ringside area, engaging in punching, kicking and chair-throwing.

== Won-loss records vs Opponents ==
Team	Win	Loss	1st (Open)	2nd (All-Filipino)	3rd (Reinforced)
Alaska	6	6	1-3	2-2	3-1
Ginebra / Anejo	7	9	3-1	1-3	3-5
Purefoods	5	5	0-4	3-1	2-0
San Miguel	1	11	0-4	0-4	1-3
Shell	5	3	2-0	1-1	2-2
RP Team	2	0	N/A	2-0	N/A
Total	26	34	6-12	9-11	11-11

== Roster ==
Presto Ice Cream roster
Players
Coaches

Pos.	No.	Nat.	Name	Ht.	Wt.
C	5	(Philippines)	Sonny Cabatu	6 ft 5 in (1.96 m)		PSBA
G	6	(Philippines)	Fortunato Co, Jr	6 ft 0 in (1.83 m)		Mapúa
G	7	(Philippines)	Arturo Cristobal	6 ft 1 in (1.85 m)		Far Eastern
G/F	8	(Philippines)	Allan Caidic	6 ft 2 in (1.88 m)		UE
F	10	(Philippines)	Joel Santos	6 ft 3 in (1.91 m)		San Beda
G/F	11	(Philippines)	Arnie Tuadles	6 ft 2 in (1.88 m)		Visayas
F	13	(Philippines)	Rey Ramos	6 ft 2 in (1.88 m)		TUA
G	15	(Philippines)	Bernie Fabiosa	5 ft 9 in (1.75 m)		UE
G	16	(Philippines)	Ranulfo Robles	6 ft 0 in (1.83 m)		Letran
F	18	(Philippines)	Philip Cezar	6 ft 2 in (1.88 m)		José Rizal
F	23	(Philippines)	Dennis Abbatuan	6 ft 2 in (1.88 m)		José Rizal
F	24	(Philippines)	Aldo Perez	6 ft 3 in (1.91 m)		De La Salle
G	25	(Philippines)	Pido Jarencio	5 ft 10 in (1.78 m)		UST
F	29	(Philippines)	Bernardo Carpio	6 ft 3 in (1.91 m)		Ateneo
F	66 & 1	(Philippines)	Abe King	6 ft 3 in (1.91 m)		San Beda

Head coach

- (Philippines) Baby Dalupan

Assistant coach(es)

- (Philippines) Bong Go

Team manager

- (Philippines) Ignacio Gotao

Legend

- (C) Team captain
- Injured

=== Additions ===
Player	Signed	Former team
Dennis Abbatuan	June 1988	Alaska
Joel Santos ^{Rookie free agent}	June 1988	N/A

=== Imports ===
Name	Conference	No.	Pos.	Ht.	College
Kenny Fields	Open Conference	54	Center-Forward	6"5'	University of California, Los Angeles
Lewis Jackson	Reinforced Conference	30	Center	6"6'	Alabama State University
George Almones ^{played six games}	Reinforced Conference	32	Forward-Guard	6"2'	Southwestern Louisiana University
Tony White ^{replaces George Almones}	Reinforced Conference	4	Guard	6"2'	University of Tennessee
