= 1988 PBA Reinforced Conference =

Philippine basketball tournament

- Duration: October 2 – December 13, 1988
- TV partner(s): Vintage Sports (PTV)

Finals
- Champions: San Miguel Beermen
- Runners-up: Shell Rimula X Oilers

Awards
- Best Import: Bobby Parks (Shell Rimula X Oilers)

PBA Reinforced Conference chronology
- < 1987 1989 >

PBA conference chronology
- < 1988 PBA/IBA 1989 Open >

The 1988 Philippine Basketball Association (PBA) Reinforced Conference was the third and last conference of the 1988 PBA season. It started on October 2 and ended on December 13, 1988. The tournament is an import-laden format, which requires two imports with a combined ceiling of 12 ft. 8 in. for each team.

== Format ==
The following format will be observed for the duration of the conference:

- Double-round robin eliminations; 10 games per team; Teams are then seeded by basis on win–loss records.
- Team with the worst record after the elimination round will be eliminated.
- Semifinals will be two round robin affairs with the five remaining teams. Results from the elimination round will be carried over.
- The top two teams in the semifinals advance to the best of seven finals. The last two teams dispute the third-place trophy in a best-of-five playoff.

== Imports ==
Each team was allowed two imports. The first line in the table are the original reinforcements of the teams. Below the name are the replacement of the import above. Same with the third replacement that is also highlighted with a different color. GP is the number of games played.

Team	Name	GP	Name	GP
Alaska Milkmen	Eddie Cox	5	Willie Bland	12
Alaska Milkmen	David Boone	13		
Añejo Rum 65	Billy Ray Bates	4	Kevin Gamble	5
Añejo Rum 65	Tommy Davis	18	Joe Ward	17
Presto Ice Cream	George Almones	6	Lewis Jackson	22
Presto Ice Cream	Tony White	15		
Purefoods Hotdogs	Ray Hall	5	Tim McCalister	3
Purefoods Hotdogs	Kenny Travis	3	Perry Young	6
San Miguel Beermen	Michael Phelps	23	Norman Black	23
Shell Rimula-X	Bobby Parks	23	Derrick Rowland	23

== Elimination round ==
Pos	Team	W	L	PCT	GB	Qualification
1	San Miguel Beermen	7	3	.700	—	Semifinal round
2	Presto Ice Cream Makers	7	3	.700	—	Semifinal round
3	Shell Rimula X Oilers	5	5	.500	2	Semifinal round
4	Alaska Milkmen	5	5	.500	2	Semifinal round
5	Añejo Rum 65ers	5	5	.500	2	Semifinal round
6	Purefoods Hotdogs	1	9	.100	6	

== Semifinal round ==
Overall standings
Pos	Team	W	L	PCT	GB	Qualification
1	San Miguel Beermen	13	5	.722	—	Advance to the Finals
2	Shell Rimula X Oilers	11	7	.611	2	Advance to the Finals
3	Presto Ice Cream Makers	10	8	.556	3	Proceed to third place playoffs
4	Añejo Rum 65ers	9	9	.500	4	Proceed to third place playoffs
5	Alaska Milkmen	6	12	.333	7	

Semifinal round standings
Pos	Team	W	L
1	San Miguel Beermen	6	2
2	Shell Rimula X Oilers	6	2
3	Añejo Rum 65ers	4	4
4	Presto Ice Cream Makers	3	5
5	Alaska Milkmen	1	7

== Third place playoffs ==
Vintage

December 4

Presto Ice Cream 141, Añejo Rum 65ers 150
Scoring by quarter: 37-34, 32–38, 35–43, 46-26
Pts: Lewis Jackson 41 Tony White 41	Pts: Tommy Davis 73

The ULTRA, Pasig

Vintage

December 6

Presto Ice Cream 138, Añejo Rum 65ers 147
Scoring by quarter: 27–34, 42-31, 43-41, 35-32
Pts: Lewis Jackson 42 Allan Caidic 31	Pts: Joe Ward 59 Tommy Davis 46

The ULTRA, Pasig

Vintage

December 8

Presto Ice Cream 138, Añejo Rum 65ers 131
Scoring by quarter: 38-28, 36-29, 27–33, 30–48
Pts: Lewis Jackson 49	Pts: Tommy Davis 51 Joe Ward 43

The ULTRA, Pasig

Vintage

December 11

Presto Ice Cream 145, Añejo Rum 65ers 171
Scoring by quarter: 40-21, 30–36, 41-35, 60-53
Pts: Lewis Jackson 33 Tony White 31	Pts: Tommy Davis 65 Joe Ward 61
Añejo Rum wins series, 3–1

The ULTRA, Pasig

== Finals ==
Vintage

December 4

San Miguel Beermen 134, Shell Rimula X 111

The ULTRA, Pasig

Vintage

December 6

San Miguel Beermen 119, Shell Rimula X 111

The ULTRA, Pasig

Vintage

December 8

San Miguel Beermen 126, Shell Rimula X 137

The ULTRA, Pasig

Vintage

December 11

San Miguel Beermen 144, Shell Rimula X 119

The ULTRA, Pasig

Vintage

December 13

San Miguel Beermen 151, Shell Rimula X 142
San Miguel wins series, 4–1

The ULTRA, Pasig
