= 1988 Purefoods Hotdogs season =

- Head coach: Ramon Fernandez (until September 8, 1988); Cris Calilan
- General manager: Domingo Panganiban
- Owner: Ayala Corporation

Open Conference results
- Record: 15–10 (60%)
- Place: 2nd
- Playoff finish: Finals (lost to SMB)

All-Filipino Conference results
- Record: 14–10 (58.3%)
- Place: 2nd
- Playoff finish: Finals (lost to Añejo)

Reinforced Conference results
- Record: 1–9 (10%)
- Place: 6th
- Playoff finish: Eliminated

Purefoods Hotdogs seasons

The 1988 Purefoods Hotdogs season was the 1st season of the franchise in the Philippine Basketball Association (PBA).

== Transactions ==
Players Added	Signed	Former team
Glenn Capacio ^{Rookie}	Off-season	N/A
Jerry Codiñera ^{Rookie}	Off-season	N/A
Jojo Lastimosa ^{Rookie}	Off-season	N/A
Jack Tanuan^{Rookie}	Off-season	N/A
Al Solis	Off-season	Shell
Manuel Marquez	Off-season	Shell
Alvin Patrimonio	June 1988	N/A

== Newest member ==
The Purefoods Corporation burst into the basketball scene when they joined the Philippine Amateur Basketball League (PABL) two years ago in 1986. When the Tanduay ballclub announces its gonna take a leave of absence beginning the 1988 PBA season, Purefoods acquired its rights and the contracts of six of the Tanduay players namely; Ramon Fernandez, Freddie Hubalde, Padim Israel, Willie Generalao, Jose Yango and Onchie Dela Cruz, and were able to lure the best amateur standouts for its maiden appearance in the PBA. An added bonus was the offer for Fernandez to serve as the team's playing-coach of the team, thus becoming the third player-coach in the league following Anejo Rhum's Robert Jaworski and San Miguel Beer's Norman Black. As for their import in the Open Conference, company officials Rene Montemayor and Chot Reyes beat other teams in hiring the services of David Thirdkill, the previous year's Open's Best Import who led Tanduay Rhum to the championship. One player Purefoods wanted to sign up was Alvin Patrimonio, and a tug-of-war between his amateur team RFM-Swifts and Purefoods has drawn reactions from both PBA and amateur cage officials, led by BAP president Lito Puyat. Patrimonio's projected stint in the pro league was finalized when the PBA and the BAP adopted a compromise apprenticeship program that would enable the likes of Patrimonio, Jerry Codinera, Jojo Lastimosa and Glenn Capacio to play in the pro league and at the same time still be available for international tournaments. The BAP ordered RFM-Swift's, Patrimonio's PABL team, to release him to the PBA without any conditions as he is set to don Purefoods' jersey come June 30.

== Finals stint ==
Purefoods Hotdogs placed runner-up in the first two conferences of the season, they came so close of winning their first championship in a Cinderella fashion against San Miguel Beermen, the Hotdogs went up, 3–2 in the series but lost the final two games.

As the odds-on favorite to win the All-Filipino title, the Hotdogs lost to crowd-favorite and arch-rival Añejo Rum 65 in the finals where the center of controversy was the management's decision to bench their former playing-coach Ramon Fernandez starting Game two of the championship series.

== Notable dates ==
March 22: Purefoods playing coach Ramon Fernandez concentrate on his bench chores because of a slight left ankle injury and he tasted his first win as a coach and the Hotdogs their franchise' first victory, a 119-107 humbling of Shell Helix. The win erased the stigma of an opening day blowout loss to San Miguel Beermen.

April 5: In the much-awaited first meeting between Purefoods and Ginebra San Miguel, the Hotdogs carved out a 116–110 win and climb into a share of the lead with San Miguel Beermen with their third straight win. Purefoods limited the Ginebras to a single three-pointer by Joey Loyzaga in a five-minute spell in the third quarter to erase a 68–57 deficit and surge in front, 78–71.

May 8: David Thirdkill hit a buzzer-beating jumper as Purefoods nip Alaska, 120–119, for their third straight win in the semifinals of the Open Conference. The Hotdogs retain solo leadership with nine wins and four losses.

May 22: Purefoods had to overcome a four-point deficit in the last two minutes of regulation period and forces extension with arch rival Ginebra San Miguel and squeezes through with a 111–109 overtime triumph that sends the Hotdogs to the Open Conference finals and a championship date with San Miguel Beermen in their maiden appearance in the league.

July 3: In his second game as a pro, prize rookie Alvin Patrimonio scored 22 points as Purefoods scored a 110–106 win over Shell.

July 12: Purefoods rallies from 19 points down to pull off a 114-110 come-from behind win over Añejo Rum 65 (formerly Ginebra San Miguel) in their first meeting in the All-Filipino Conference.

August 11: Ramon Fernandez scored a conference-high 47 points in leading the Hotdogs to a 132–125 victory over San Miguel Beermen at the start of the All-Filipino Conference semifinals.

August 18: Purefoods turn back Añejo Rum, 109–106, for their 11th victory in 16 games. The Hotdogs trailed, 102–106, with one minute left in the ballgame. Al Solis buried a triple to cut the deficit to a point with 50 seconds remaining which started Purefoods' final 7-0 windup.

August 23: Purefoods preserve a 119–116 triumph over San Miguel Beermen for their 12th win in 17 games at the start of the second round of the semifinals and moved within a win of nailing the first finals berth in the All-Filipino Conference. It was the fourth straight victory by the Hotdogs over the Beermen since losing to San Miguel in the Open finals.

October 23: Purefoods snapped out of their eight-game losing streak since the All-Filipino title playoffs with their first win in the Third Conference after six losses. The Hotdogs overcame Alaska import Willie Bland's 70 points in scoring a pulsating 148–147 overtime win over the Airmen. New hotdogs' import Kenny Travis played the hero's role and finished with 35 points while Perry Young was the top scorer for Purefoods with 50 points.

== Occurrences ==
Amateur standout Alvin Patrimonio finally debuted in the PBA on June 30.

After four games in the All-Filipino Conference and leading his team to two victories and two losses, playing-coach Ramon Fernandez gave up his coaching chores to assistant coach Cris Calilan.

Purefoods management bench Ramon Fernandez starting Game two of the All-Filipino championship against Añejo Rum, Fernandez watch his team lose the finals series in Game four while sitting at courtside.

Barely a week after Purefoods lost to Añejo Rum 65 in the All-Filipino finals series, Ramon Fernandez was traded to San Miguel Beermen in exchange for Abet Guidaben in a repeat of a similar trade that took place three years ago.

== Won–loss records vs opponents ==
Team	Win	Loss	1st (Open)	2nd (All-Filipino)	3rd (Reinforced)
Alaska	8	2	4-0	3-1	1-1
Ginebra / Anejo	5	9	2-2	3-5	0-2
Great Taste / Presto	5	5	4-0	1-3	0-2
San Miguel	8	9	4-7	4-0	0-2
Shell	3	3	1-1	2-0	0-2
RP Team	1	1	N/A	1-1	N/A
Total	30	29	15-10	14-10	1-9

== Roster ==
1988 Purefoods Hotdogs roster
Players

Pos.	#	POB	Name	Height	Weight	DOB (YYYY–MM–DD)	From
G	6	(Philippines)	Jojo Lastimosa	6 ft 1 in (1.85 m)			USJ–R
G	8	(Philippines)	Al Solis	5 ft 11 in (1.80 m)			Visayas
G	9	(Philippines)	Joshua Villapando	6 ft 1 in (1.85 m)			PSBA
G	3 & 12	(Philippines)	Glenn Capacio	6 ft 1 in (1.85 m)			Far Eastern
C	14	(Philippines)	Jack Tanuan	6 ft 6 in (1.98 m)			Far Eastern
F	16	(Philippines)	Alvin Patrimonio	6 ft 3 in (1.91 m)			Mapúa
F	17	(Philippines)	Padim Israel	6 ft 3 in (1.91 m)			Ateneo
F	24	(Philippines)	Jose Yango	6 ft 3 in (1.91 m)			San Beda
C	32	(Philippines)	Abet Guidaben	6 ft 5 in (1.96 m)			USJ–R
G	42	(Philippines)	Willie Generalao	5 ft 8 in (1.73 m)			Visayas
C	44	(Philippines)	Jerry Codinera	6 ft 5 in (1.96 m)			UE
F	71	(Philippines)	Manuel Marquez	6 ft 2 in (1.88 m)			San Beda

Coaches

Head coach

- (Philippines) Cris Calilan

Assistant coach(es)

- (Philippines) Ely Capacio

Legend

- (C) Team captain
- Injured

=== Subtractions ===
Player	Signed	New team
Onchie dela Cruz	July 1988	Shell Rimula-X

=== Trades ===
July 1988	To Shell Rimula-X Freddie Hubalde	To Purefoods Hotdogs Jojo Villapando
September 1988	To San Miguel Beermen Ramon Fernandez	To Purefoods Hotdogs Abet Guidaben

=== Imports ===
Name	Conference	No.	Pos.	Ht.	College
David Thirdkill	Open Conference	22	Center-Forward	6"6'	Bradley University
Tim McCalister ^{played three games}	Reinforced Conference	13	Forward	6"3'	University of Oklahoma
Ray Hall ^{played six games}	Reinforced Conference	21	Forward	6"3'	Canisius College
Perry Young ^{replaces Tim McCalister}	Reinforced Conference	23	Forward-Center	6"5'	Virginia State University
Kenny Travis ^{replaces Ray Hall}	Reinforced Conference	10	Forward-Guard	6"1'	New Mexico State University

== Win–loss record ==
Season Rank	GP	Win	Lost	Pct.
3rd Overall	59	30	29	0.508
