= 1988 Shell Rimula X Diesel Oilers season =

- Head coach: Joe Lipa; Dante Silverio
- General manager: Charlie Favis
- Owners: Pilipinas Shell, Inc.

Open Conference results
- Record: 1–9 (10%)
- Place: 6th
- Playoff finish: N/A

All-Filipino Conference results
- Record: 3–9 (25%)
- Place: 7th
- Playoff finish: N/A

Reinforced Conference results
- Record: 12–11 (52.2%)
- Place: 2nd
- Playoff finish: Finals (lost to SMB, 1-4)

Shell Rimula X Diesel Oilers seasons

The 1988 Shell Rimula X Diesel Oilers season was the 4th season of the franchise in the Philippine Basketball Association (PBA). Known as Shell Helix Oilers in the Open Conference.

== Transactions ==
Players Added	Signed	Former team
Ronnie Magsanoc ^{Rookie}	Off-season	N/A
Aurelio Jalmasco ^{Rookie}	Off-season	N/A
Demetrio Antonio ^{Rookie}	Off-season	N/A
Joshua Villapando ^{Rookie free agent}	Off-season	N/A
Edgardo Cordero	Off-season	Tanduay Rhum (disbanded)
Angelito Esguerra	Off-season	Tanduay Rhum (disbanded)
Victor Sanchez	Off-season	Tanduay Rhum (disbanded)

== Notable dates ==
April 17: The Shell Helix Oilers rode high on the heroics of Leo Austria's back-to-back triples going into the last two minutes to prevail over Purefoods Hotdogs, 125–119, for their first victory of the season after six losses. Import Vincent Askew, who replaces Durand Macklin after four games, topscored with 31 points.

July 30: Leo Austria sank a jumper with a second left in the extension period as Shell ends its woes with a 117–116 overtime victory over Añejo Rum in Batangas City for their second win in eight outings in the All-Filipino Conference, snapping their five-game losing streak and give acting coach Charlie Favis his first win since taking over the post vacated by Joe Lipa. New recruit Freddie Hubalde, formerly of Purefoods, now playing with the Oilers, topscored with 29 points.

October 2: Ronnie Magsanoc scored 12 of his 15 points in the last period to lift Shell past Presto Ice Cream, 125–120, at the start of the Reinforced Conference.

October 18: Bobby Parks scored a career-high 63 points to give Shell its fifth win in six games, a 134–124 victory over winless Purefoods Hotdogs.

November 24: Shell moves closer to one of the two finals berth in the Reinforced Conference, repeating over San Miguel in the semifinals, 124–122, it was their fifth win in six outings in the semifinal round.

== Occurrences ==
Former Toyota coach Dante Silverio return to coaching during the Third Conference, replacing Joe Lipa after Shell had a forgettable first two conferences, placing last both times with a combined record of 4 wins and 18 losses. The Diesel Oilers beat the other teams in securing last year's Reinforced Conference best import Bobby Parks, who was prevented from returning to the ballclub he led to the championship last season; San Miguel Beermen, due to the PBA ruling of one old, one new import per team. Parks teamed up with Continental Basketball Association (CBA) standout Derrick Rowland.

In Game five of the Reinforced Conference finals, the San Miguel Beermen had the championship all wrapped up with a minute left and started prematurely celebrating; confetti and balloons were already released from the ceiling. Irked by what the SMB people did, Shell coach Dante Silverio ordered his team to walk out and headed to the dugout with still 36 seconds remaining, the Beermen on top, 147–138. The last game of the season almost ended on a bizarre note, league officials were able to convince coach Dante Silverio and the Shell team to come back and finish the game, the clock was reset at 1:11 and the score 145-134 for San Miguel.

== Finals stint ==
Under new coach Dante Silverio, Shell began winning with their new-found character, the Diesel Oilers made it all the way to the Third Conference finals against defending champion San Miguel Beermen, played well as an underdog in eventually losing 1–4 in the best-of-seven series.

== Won–loss records vs opponents ==
Team	Win	Loss	1st (Open)	2nd (All-Filipino)	3rd (Reinforced)
Alaska	4	4	0-2	1-1	3–1
Ginebra / Anejo	3	5	0-2	1-1	2-2
Great Taste / Presto	3	5	0-2	1-1	2-2
Purefoods	3	3	1-1	0-2	2–0
San Miguel	3	10	0-2	0-2	3–6
RP Team	0	2	N/A	0-2	N/A
Total	16	29	1-9	3-9	12-11

== Roster ==
1988 Shell Rimula X Diesel Oilers roster
Players

Pos.	#	POB	Name	Height	Weight	DOB (YYYY–MM–DD)	From
C	1	(Philippines)	Manny Victorino	6 ft 5 in (1.96 m)			José Rizal
F	2	(Philippines)	Jay Ramirez	6 ft 2 in (1.88 m)			Visayas
F	3	(Philippines)	Edgardo Cordero	6 ft 3 in (1.91 m)			UST
G	5	(Philippines)	Ronnie Magsanoc	5 ft 9 in (1.75 m)			UP Diliman
G/F	6	(Philippines)	Aurelio Jalmasco	5 ft 11 in (1.80 m)			FEATI University
G	7	(Philippines)	Ramon Dela Cruz	5 ft 11 in (1.80 m)			Philippine Christian
F/C	9	(Philippines)	Rey Cuenco	6 ft 4 in (1.93 m)			De La Salle Araneta
G	10	(Philippines)	Romeo Ang	6 ft 1 in (1.85 m)			Letran
G	11	(Philippines)	Jaime Manansala	5 ft 11 in (1.80 m)			UE
F	12	(Philippines)	Victor Sanchez	6 ft 2 in (1.88 m)			Mapúa
G	13	(Philippines)	Leo Austria	5 ft 10 in (1.78 m)			Lyceum
F	14	(Philippines)	Leopoldo Herrera	6 ft 2 in (1.88 m)			Wesleyan Philippines
F	16	(Philippines)	Angelito Esguerra	6 ft 1 in (1.85 m)			Letran
G/F	19	(Philippines)	Freddie Hubalde	6 ft 1 in (1.85 m)			Mapúa
F		(Philippines)	Demetrio Antonio	6 ft 3 in (1.91 m)			Cebu

Coaches

Head coach

- (Philippines) Joe Lipa
- (Philippines) Dante Silverio

Assistant coach(es)

- (Philippines) Arlene Rodriguez

Legend

- (C) Team captain
- Injured

=== Additions ===
Player	Signed	Former team
Onchie Dela Cruz	July 1988	Purefoods
Jay Ramirez ^{Rookie free agent}	October 1988	N/A

=== Trades ===
July 1988	To Purefoods Hotdogs Jojo Villapando	To Shell Rimula-X Freddie Hubalde

=== Imports ===
Name	Conference	No.	Pos.	Ht.	College
Durand Macklin ^{played four games}	Open Conference	40	Forward-Center	6"5'	Louisiana State University
Vincent Askew ^{replaces Rudy Macklin}	Open Conference	30	Center-Forward	6"6'	Memphis State University
Bobby Parks	Reinforced Conference	22	Forward	6"3'	Memphis State University
Derrick Rowland	Reinforced Conference	44	Center	6"5'	State University of New York
