= 1988 San Miguel Beermen season =

- Head coach: Norman Black
- Owner: San Miguel Corporation

Open Conference results
- Record: 16–9 (64%)
- Place: 1st
- Playoff finish: Champions

All-Filipino Conference results
- Record: 13–11 (54.2%)
- Place: 4th
- Playoff finish: Semifinals

Reinforced Conference results
- Record: 17–6 (73.9%)
- Place: 1st
- Playoff finish: Champions

San Miguel Beermen seasons

The 1988 San Miguel Beermen season was the 14th season of the franchise in the Philippine Basketball Association (PBA).

== Transactions ==
Players Added	Signed	Former team
Ricardo Brown	Off-season	Great Taste

== Occurrences ==
When Purefoods center Ramon Fernandez was benched in game two of the All-Filipino Conference finals and subsequently banished for the rest of the series, San Miguel began to ponder the possibilities. On September 15, San Miguel Beer representative Jose "Nono" Ibazeta reportedly called Purefoods chairman and president Rene Buhain on a possible swap between Ramon Fernandez and their center, two-time MVP Abet Guidaben; the next morning, a deal was sealed sending Guidaben to the Purefoods Hotdogs and a homecoming for Ramon Fernandez, who first played with San Miguel in the early 1970s, the trade between the two league pioneers was a repeat of a similar swapped that took place in 1985.

== Championships ==
For only the second time in PBA history, the best-of-seven finals went into a full route. San Miguel Beermen came back from a 2-3 deficit and won the final series against Purefoods, denying the Hotdogs a championship in their first try. The Beermen won back-to-back titles and duplicated the feat achieved by the famed Toyota Super Corollas back in 1982, by winning the last two games of the seven-game series.

With a new ruling of one-old, one-new import for the Third Conference, disallowing playing-coach Norman Black to teamed up with last year's reinforcement and best import Bobby Parks. Black opted for former Seattle Supersonic and Los Angeles Clipper Michael Phelps as his partner. San Miguel had an easier time winning the championship in the season-ending conference, defeating Shell Rimula-X, led by imports Bobby Parks and Derrick Rowland, 4 games to 1, to retain the title they won last season.

== Awards ==
- Ramon Fernandez, who played for Purefoods in the first two conferences until he was traded to San Miguel Beer before the third conference, won his record-breaking fourth Most Valuable Player (MVP) award.
- Alvin Teng was named the Most Improved Player of the season.
- Two other beermen; Hector Calma and Ricardo Brown, were named in the Mythical team first five selection.

== Notable dates ==
March 20: San Miguel Beer spoiled the debut of newcomer Purefoods Hotdogs in the main game of the league's 14th season opening, leading by as many as 30 points in the fourth quarter and coast to an easy 119-104 victory. Norman Black scored 33 points and Abet Guidaben added 28 points.

May 19: Norman Black scored 45 points as San Miguel clinch the first finals berth in the Open Conference with its 12th victory in 18 games, winning over Great Taste, 173-137.

July 10: San Miguel Beer handed Great Taste their first loss in the All-Filipino Conference after a 4-0 start, scoring a 139-132 win for their second victory after losing their first two games.

July 26: Abet Guidaben topscored with 30 points and scored on a marginal basket from 20 feet after he fumbled the ball with five seconds left to give the beermen a 104-103 win over Añejo Rum, that ended their five-game losing misery against their sister team.

October 2: Import Michael Phelps scored 50 points to lead San Miguel to a 150–122 rout of listless Purefoods Hotdogs at the start of the Reinforced Conference as all eyes were focused on the two players involved in the blockbuster trade, former Purefoods playing-coach Ramon Fernandez played his first game as a Beerman while leading MVP candidate Abet Guidaben is now playing for the Hotdogs.

October 9: San Miguel kept its unbeaten slate to three wins without a loss, beating Shell Rimula-X, 124–115. Norman Black scored 30 points and grabbed 20 rebounds while Bobby Parks, playing against his former teammates for the first time, scored 42 points for the Diesel Oilers.

November 10: In the battle of league-leaders at the beginning of the semifinal round, San Miguel blasts Presto Ice Cream, 144-117. Both teams carry a 7-3 won-loss slate before their game.

November 22: San Miguel ousted Añejo Rum from the finals race with a 127-118 victory for their 11th win at the start of the second round of the semifinals.

== Won–loss records vs opponents ==
Team	Win	Loss	1st (Open)	2nd (All-Filipino)	3rd (Reinforced)
Alaska	9	6	3-1	3-4	3-1
Ginebra / Anejo	5	8	0-4	2-3	3-1
Great Taste / Presto	11	1	4-0	4-0	3-1
Purefoods	9	8	7-4	0-4	2-0
Shell	10	3	2-0	2-0	6-3
RP Team	2	0	N/A	2-0	N/A
Total	46	26	16-9	13-11	17-6

== Roster ==
1988 San Miguel Beermen roster
Players

Pos.	#	POB	Name	Height	Weight	DOB (YYYY–MM–DD)	From
F	4	(Philippines)	Elmer Reyes	6 ft 1 in (1.85 m)			San Beda
G	5	(Philippines)	Franz Pumaren	5 ft 9 in (1.75 m)			De La Salle
G	7	(Philippines)	Alfie Almario	6 ft 0 in (1.83 m)			De La Salle
F	9	(Philippines)	Samboy Lim	6 ft 0 in (1.83 m)			Letran
F	10	(Philippines)	Alvin Teng	6 ft 4 in (1.93 m)			Arellano
C	11	(Philippines)	Tonichi Yturri	6 ft 5 in (1.96 m)			De La Salle
F	12	(Philippines)	Yves Dignadice	6 ft 4 in (1.93 m)			STI WNU
G	14	(Philippines)	Hector Calma	5 ft 9 in (1.75 m)			Adamson
F	15	(Philippines)	Ricardo Cui	6 ft 3 in (1.91 m)			Lyceum
F	17	(Philippines)	Jeffrey Graves	6 ft 3 in (1.91 m)			Angeles
C	19	(Philippines)	Ramon Fernandez	6 ft 4 in (1.93 m)			San Carlos
G	23	(United States)	Ricardo Brown	5 ft 11 in (1.80 m)			Pepperdine

Coaches

Head coach

- (United States) Norman Black

Assistant coach(es)

- (Philippines) Derrick Pumaren
- (Philippines) Pilo Pumaren

Legend

- (C) Team captain
- Injured

=== Trades ===
September 1988	To Purefoods Hotdogs Abet Guidaben	To San Miguel Beermen Ramon Fernandez

=== Imports ===
Name	Conference	No.	Pos.	Ht.	College
Norman Black	Open Conference; Reinforced Conference	24	Center-Forward	6"5'	Saint Joseph's University
Michael Phelps	Reinforced Conference	25	Guard-Forward	6"3'	Alcorn State University
