= Joe Ward (basketball) =

American basketball player (born 1963)

Personal information
- Born: January 21, 1963 (age 63) Barnesville, Georgia
- Listed height: 6 ft 6 in (1.98 m)
- Listed weight: 210 lb (95 kg)

Career information
- High school: Griffin (Griffin, Georgia)
- College: Clemson (1981–1982); Georgia (1983–1986)
- NBA draft: 1986: 2nd round, 31st overall pick
- Drafted by: Phoenix Suns
- Position: Small forward

Career history

Playing
- 1987–1989: Savannah Spirits / Tulsa Fast Breakers
- 1988: Añejo Rum 65ers
- 1989–1991: Rapid City Thrillers
- 1993: Yakima Sun Kings
- 1994: Oklahoma City Cavalry

Coaching
- 2000–2007: Mesa Community College
- 2014–2018: UP (assistant)
- 2019: Adamson (assistant)

Career highlights
- CBA champion (1989); All-CBA Second Team (1991); Second-team All-SEC (1986); Fourth-team Parade All-American (1981)
- Stats at Basketball Reference

Joseph Nathan Ward (born January 21, 1963) is a retired American professional basketball player. He was the Phoenix Suns' second round draft pick in the 1986 NBA draft.

== Early life ==
As an 11-year-old in the mid-1970s, Ward first played basketball games in the Griffin (Ga.) Spalding County Parks and Recreation Department's youth program.

== College basketball career ==
Ward first played at Clemson University as a freshman. He transferred to the University of Georgia and sat out the 1983 season. He became a starter five games into his sophomore season and made 90% of his free throws as a sophomore as well. He remained a starter for the next three years. As a senior under coach Hugh Durham in 1985–86, Ward was named to the Coaches' All-SEC first team with averages of 15.6 points and 5.3 rebounds per game.

He averaged a combined 11.2 points in his college playing career, shot 53.7% from the field, and was known to have great jumping ability. Being a favorite of Georgia Bulldog fans in the mid-1980s, Ward was honored as part of the Chick-Fil-A SEC Basketball Legends program at the 2006 SEC Tournament.

== CBA career ==
Ward also played in the Continental Basketball Association (CBA) with the Savannah Spirits, Tulsa Fast Breakers, Rapid City Thrillers, Yakima Sun Kings and Oklahoma City Cavalry. In total, Ward played six seasons in the CBA, averaging 15.3 points and 5.5 rebounds per game for his career. He won a league championship with Tulsa in 1989 and was a second team All-CBA pick in 1991 with Rapid City.

== PBA stint ==
Ward played in the Philippines for the Añejo Rum 65 ballclub in the Philippine Basketball Association (PBA). When he arrived in Manila, Ward was fresh from the Philadelphia 76ers camp. He displayed guts in his PBA debut on October 20, 1988, battling cramps in tossing 55 points, his highest total output in his PBA stint was 78 points on December 1, 1988.

== Coaching career ==
=== High school ranks ===
After a nine-year playing career in 1994, Ward arrived in the Knoxville area and started coaching with the Rule Christian Academy (RCA) recreation program. In nine years there, he won championships as he guided RCA's 15 to 17-year-olds and would sometimes coach three different teams in a season.

=== UAAP ===
In 2014, Ward was recruited to join the UP Fighting Maroons men's basketball coaching staff of Rey Madrid. He was brought in primarily to train two bigs from UP's Team B. Due to the Madrid's departure from the team in 2015, Ward began to coach the Maroons on an interim basis. A few months later, while also being the UP-affiliated Diliman Fighting Maroons coach in the Filsports Basketball Association, he was promoted as head coach of the Maroons. But he was relaged to assistant for UAAP Season 78 when Rensy Bajar was designated as head coach.

In 2019, Ward joined the Adamson Falcons men's basketball coaching staff under head coach Franz Pumaren.

=== Return to high school ranks ===
In 2022, Ward became the Head Coach of (Knoxville) Central High School boys' basketball team.
