= 1988 PBA season =

14th PBA season

- Duration: March 20 – December 13, 1988
- Teams: 6
- TV partner: Vintage Sports (PTV)

1988 PBA Draft
- Top draft pick: Edgar Tanuan
- Picked by: Purefoods Hotdogs
- Season MVP: Ramon Fernandez (San Miguel Beermen)
- Open Conference champions: San Miguel Beermen
- Open Conference runners-up: Purefoods Hotdogs
- All-Filipino Conference champions: Añejo Rum 65ers
- All-Filipino Conference runners-up: Purefoods Hotdogs
- Reinforced Conference champions: San Miguel Beermen
- Reinforced Conference runners-up: Shell Rimula X Diesel Oilers

Seasons
- ← 1987 1989 →

The 1988 PBA season was the 14th season of the Philippine Basketball Association (PBA).

== Board of governors ==
=== Executive committee ===
- Rodrigo L. Salud (Commissioner)
- Reynaldo Marquez (Chairman, representing Shell Rimula-X Diesel Oilers)
- Jose C. Ibazeta (Vice-Chairman, representing San Miguel Beermen)
- Wilfred Steven Uytengsu (Treasurer, representing Alaska Milkmen)

=== Teams ===
Team	Company	Governor
Alaska Milkmen	General Milling Corporation	Wilfred Steven Uytengsu
Añejo Rhum 65ers	La Tondeña Incorporada	Carlos Palanca III
Purefoods TJ Hotdogs	Purefoods Corporation	Renato Buhain
Presto Ice Cream Makers	Consolidated Foods Corporation	Lance Gokongwei
San Miguel Beermen	San Miguel Corporation	Jose Ibazeta
Shell Rimula-X Diesel Oilers	Pilipinas Shell Petroleum Corporation	Reynaldo Marquez

== Season highlights ==
- The Tanduay Rhum Makers filed a leave on absence for the 1988 season on January 16, 1988, citing realignment of corporate objectives. After Tanduay filed a leave, some remnants were absorbed, along with several amateur prospects by Purefoods Corporation, which joined the league after buying a franchise worth P300,000.
- PBA deputy commissioner Rudy Salud became the league's third commissioner. Under Salud's leadership, the PBA soared to greater heights, the Purefoods Hotdogs' entry, along with the never-say-die attitude of the league's most popular team Añejo Rum 65ers, contributed largely to a box-office success in gate attendance.
- Amateur standout Alvin Patrimonio, who was a subject of a bitter tug-of-war between the PBA's newest team Purefoods Hotdogs and his mother ballclub in the PABL, corporate rival RFM-Swifts, finally made his PBA debut on June 30.
- A blockbuster trade took place before the opening of the Third Conference as veterans Ramon Fernandez of Purefoods, who was bench in the All-Filipino title-series, and Abet Guidaben of San Miguel were traded to each other by their respective ballclubs.
- Ramon Fernandez won his fourth Most Valuable Player trophy as he continued his tradition of winning the prestigious award every two years starting in 1982.

== Opening ceremonies ==
The muses for the participating teams are as follows:

Team	Muse
Alaska Milkmen	Lydia de Vega
Ginebra San Miguel	Monina Tan
Great Taste Instant Milk	Alice Dixson
Purefoods Hotdogs	Aiza Seguerra & Tweety de Leon
San Miguel Beermen	Rowena Moran
Shell Helix	

== Champions ==
- Open Conference: San Miguel Beermen
- All-Filipino Conference: Añejo Rum 65
- Reinforced Conference: San Miguel Beermen
- Team with best win–loss percentage: San Miguel Beermen (46–26, .639)
- Best Team of the Year: San Miguel Beermen (1st)

== Open Conference ==
=== Elimination round ===
Pos	Team	W	L	PCT	GB	Qualification
1	San Miguel Beermen	7	3	.700	—	Semifinal round
2	Ginebra San Miguel	6	4	.600	1	Semifinal round
3	Purefoods Hotdogs	6	4	.600	1	Semifinal round
4	Alaska Milkmen	6	4	.600	1	Semifinal round
5	Great Taste Instant Milk	4	6	.400	3	Semifinal round
6	Shell Helix Oilers	1	9	.100	6	

=== Semifinal round ===
Overall standings
Pos	Team	W	L	PCT	GB	Qualification
1	San Miguel Beermen	12	6	.667 (Note: Head-to-head record: San Miguel 3–1 Purefoods)	—	Advance to the Finals
2	Purefoods Hotdogs	12	6	.667	—	Advance to the Finals
3	Ginebra San Miguel	10	8	.556	2	Proceed to third place playoffs
4	Alaska Milkmen	9	9	.500	3	Proceed to third place playoffs
5	Great Taste Instant Milk	6	12	.333	6	

Notes:

Semifinal round standings
Pos	Team	W	L
1	Purefoods Hotdogs	6	2
2	San Miguel Beermen	5	3
3	Ginebra San Miguel	4	4
4	Alaska Milkmen	3	5
5	Great Taste Instant Milk	2	6

=== Third place playoffs ===
Team 1	Series	Team 2	Game 1	Game 2	Game 3	Game 4	Game 5
(3) Ginebra San Miguel	2–3	(4) Alaska Milkmen	119–121 (OT)	115–112	118–130	127–100	104–117

=== Finals ===
Team 1	Series	Team 2	Game 1	Game 2	Game 3	Game 4	Game 5	Game 6	Game 7
(1) San Miguel Beermen	4–3	(2) Purefoods Hotdogs	129–116	101–107	88–96	93–88	97–103	105–85	94–92

- Best Import of the Conference: Jamie Waller (Ginebra)

== All-Filipino Conference ==
=== Elimination round ===
Pos	Team	W	L	PCT	GB	Qualification
1	Purefoods Hotdogs	8	4	.667	—	Semifinal round
2	San Miguel Beermen	8	4	.667	—	Semifinal round
3	Alaska Milkmen	7	5	.583	1	Semifinal round
4	Añejo Rum 65ers	7	5	.583	1	Semifinal round
5	Great Taste Instant Milk	6	6	.500	2	Semifinal round
6	Shell Rimula X Diesel Oilers	3	9	.250	5	
7	Philippine national team (G)	3	9	.250	5	

(G) Guests

=== Semifinal round ===
Overall standings
Pos	Team	W	L	PCT	GB	Qualification
1	Purefoods Hotdogs	13	7	.650	—	Advance to the Finals
2	Añejo Rum 65ers	12	8	.600 (Note: Second-seed playoff: Añejo 102–100 San Miguel)	1	Advance to the Finals
3	San Miguel Beermen	12	8	.600	1	Proceed to third place playoffs
4	Alaska Milkmen	10	10	.500	3	Proceed to third place playoffs
5	Great Taste Instant Milk	9	11	.450	4	

Notes:

Semifinal round standings
Pos	Team	W	L
1	Añejo Rum 65ers	5	3
2	Purefoods Hotdogs	5	3
3	San Miguel Beermen	4	4
4	Alaska Milkmen	3	5
5	Great Taste Instant Milk	3	5

=== Third place playoffs ===
Team 1	Series	Team 2	Game 1	Game 2	Game 3
(3) San Miguel Beermen	2–1	(4) Alaska Milkmen	112–108	115–121	87–98

=== Finals ===
Team 1	Series	Team 2	Game 1	Game 2	Game 3	Game 4	Game 5
(1) Purefoods Hotdogs	1–3	(2) Añejo Rum 65ers	105–111	117–112	110–112	124–135 (OT)	—

== Reinforced Conference ==
=== Elimination round ===
Pos	Team	W	L	PCT	GB	Qualification
1	San Miguel Beermen	7	3	.700	—	Semifinal round
2	Presto Ice Cream Makers	7	3	.700	—	Semifinal round
3	Shell Rimula X Oilers	5	5	.500	2	Semifinal round
4	Alaska Milkmen	5	5	.500	2	Semifinal round
5	Añejo Rum 65ers	5	5	.500	2	Semifinal round
6	Purefoods Hotdogs	1	9	.100	6	

=== Semifinal round ===
Overall standings
Pos	Team	W	L	PCT	GB	Qualification
1	San Miguel Beermen	13	5	.722	—	Advance to the Finals
2	Shell Rimula X Oilers	11	7	.611	2	Advance to the Finals
3	Presto Ice Cream Makers	10	8	.556	3	Proceed to third place playoffs
4	Añejo Rum 65ers	9	9	.500	4	Proceed to third place playoffs
5	Alaska Milkmen	6	12	.333	7	

Semifinal round standings
Pos	Team	W	L
1	San Miguel Beermen	6	2
2	Shell Rimula X Oilers	6	2
3	Añejo Rum 65ers	4	4
4	Presto Ice Cream Makers	3	5
5	Alaska Milkmen	1	7

=== Third place playoffs ===
Team 1	Series	Team 2	Game 1	Game 2	Game 3	Game 4	Game 5
(3) Presto Ice Cream Makers	1–3	(4) Añejo Rum 65ers	141–150	138–147	138–131	145–171	—

=== Finals ===
Team 1	Series	Team 2	Game 1	Game 2	Game 3	Game 4	Game 5	Game 6	Game 7
(1) San Miguel Beermen	4–1	(2) Shell Rimula X Oilers	134–111	119–111	126–137	144–119	151–142	—	—

- Best Import of the Conference: Bobby Parks (Shell)

== Awards ==
- Most Valuable Player: Ramon Fernandez (Purefoods, San Miguel)
- Rookie of the Year: Jojo Lastimosa (Purefoods)
- Most Improved Player: Alvin Teng (San Miguel)
- Best Import-Open Conference: Jamie Waller (Ginebra)
- Best Import-Reinforced Conference: Bobby Parks (Shell)
- Mythical Five:
  - Ricardo Brown (San Miguel)
  - Hector Calma (San Miguel)
  - Abet Guidaben (San Miguel, Purefoods)
  - Ramon Fernandez (Purefoods, San Miguel)
  - Allan Caidic (Great Taste/Presto)
- Mythical Second Team:
  - Robert Jaworski (Añejo)
  - Jojo Lastimosa (Purefoods)
  - Jerry Codiñera (Purefoods)
  - Elpidio Villamin (Alaska)
  - Dondon Ampalayo (Añejo)
- All-Defensive Team:
  - Abe King (Great Taste/Presto)
  - Philip Cezar (Great Taste/Presto)
  - Elpidio Villamin (Alaska)
  - Robert Jaworski (Añejo)
  - Biboy Ravanes (Alaska)

== Cumulative standings ==
Pos	Team	Pld	W	L	PCT	Best finish
1	San Miguel Beermen	71	47	24	.662	Champions
2	Ginebra San Miguel/Añejo Rum 65ers	69	39	30	.565	Champions
3	Purefoods Hotdogs	59	30	29	.508	Finalist
4	Alaska Milkmen/Air Force	64	29	35	.453	Third place
5	Great Taste Instant Milk/Presto Ice Cream Makers	60	26	34	.433	Semifinalist
6	Shell Helix Oilers/Rimula X Diesel Oilers/Oilers	45	16	29	.356	Finalist
7	Philippine national team (G)	12	3	9	.250	Elimination round

(G) Guests

=== Elimination round ===
Pos	Team	Pld	W	L	PCT
1	San Miguel Beermen	32	22	10	.688
2	Ginebra San Miguel/Añejo Rum 65ers	32	18	14	.563
3	Alaska Milkmen/Air Force	32	18	14	.563
4	Great Taste Instant Milk/Presto Ice Cream Makers	32	17	15	.531
5	Purefoods Hotdogs	32	15	17	.469
6	Shell Helix Oilers/Rimula X Diesel Oilers/Oilers	32	9	23	.281
7	Philippine national team (G)	12	3	9	.250

(G) Guests

=== Playoffs ===
Pos	Team	Pld	W	L
1	San Miguel Beermen	39	25	14
2	Ginebra San Miguel/Añejo Rum 65ers	37	21	16
3	Purefoods Hotdogs	27	15	12
4	Alaska Milkmen/Air Force	32	11	21
5	Great Taste Instant Milk/Presto Ice Cream Makers	28	9	19
6	Shell Helix Oilers/Rimula X Diesel Oilers/Oilers	13	7	6
