= 1988 PBA Open Conference =

- Duration: March 20 – June 9, 1988
- TV partner(s): Vintage Sports (PTV)

Finals
- Champions: San Miguel Beermen
- Runners-up: Purefoods Hotdogs

Awards
- Best Import: Jamie Waller (Ginebra San Miguel)

PBA Open Conference chronology
- < 1987 1989 >

PBA conference chronology
- < 1987 Reinforced 1988 All-Filipino >

The 1988 Philippine Basketball Association (PBA) Open Conference was the first conference of the 1988 PBA season. It started on March 20 and ended on June 9, 1988. The tournament is an import-laden format, which requires an import or a pure-foreign player for each team.

== Format ==
The following format will be observed for the duration of the conference:

- Double-round robin eliminations; 10 games per team; Teams are then seeded by basis on win–loss records.
- Team with the worst record after the elimination round will be eliminated.
- Semifinals will be two round robin affairs with the five remaining teams. Results from the elimination round will be carried over.
- The top two teams in the semifinals advance to the best of seven finals. The last two teams dispute the third-place trophy in a best-of-five playoff.

== Elimination round ==
Pos	Team	W	L	PCT	GB	Qualification
1	San Miguel Beermen	7	3	.700	—	Semifinal round
2	Ginebra San Miguel	6	4	.600	1	Semifinal round
3	Purefoods Hotdogs	6	4	.600	1	Semifinal round
4	Alaska Milkmen	6	4	.600	1	Semifinal round
5	Great Taste Instant Milk	4	6	.400	3	Semifinal round
6	Shell Helix Oilers	1	9	.100	6	

== Semifinal round ==
Overall standings
Pos	Team	W	L	PCT	GB	Qualification
1	San Miguel Beermen	12	6	.667 (Note: Head-to-head record: San Miguel 3–1 Purefoods)	—	Advance to the Finals
2	Purefoods Hotdogs	12	6	.667	—	Advance to the Finals
3	Ginebra San Miguel	10	8	.556	2	Proceed to third place playoffs
4	Alaska Milkmen	9	9	.500	3	Proceed to third place playoffs
5	Great Taste Instant Milk	6	12	.333	6	

Notes:

Semifinal round standings
Pos	Team	W	L
1	Purefoods Hotdogs	6	2
2	San Miguel Beermen	5	3
3	Ginebra San Miguel	4	4
4	Alaska Milkmen	3	5
5	Great Taste Instant Milk	2	6

== Third place playoffs ==
Vintage

May 26

Ginebra San Miguel 119, Alaska Milkmen 121 (OT)

The ULTRA, Pasig

Vintage

May 29

Ginebra San Miguel 115, Alaska Milkmen 112

The ULTRA, Pasig

Vintage

May 31

Ginebra San Miguel 118, Alaska Milkmen 130

The ULTRA, Pasig

Vintage

June 2

Ginebra San Miguel 127, Alaska Milkmen 100

The ULTRA, Pasig

Vintage

June 5

Ginebra San Miguel 104, Alaska Milkmen 117
Alaska wins series, 3–2

The ULTRA, Pasig

== Finals ==
Vintage

May 26

San Miguel Beermen 129, Purefoods Hotdogs 116

The ULTRA, Pasig

Vintage

May 29

San Miguel Beermen 101, Purefoods Hotdogs 107

The ULTRA, Pasig

Vintage

May 31

San Miguel Beermen 88, Purefoods Hotdogs 96

The ULTRA, Pasig

Vintage

June 2

San Miguel Beermen 93, Purefoods Hotdogs 88

The ULTRA, Pasig

Vintage

June 5

San Miguel Beermen 97, Purefoods Hotdogs 103

The ULTRA, Pasig

Vintage

June 7

San Miguel Beermen 105, Purefoods Hotdogs 85

The ULTRA, Pasig

Vintage

June 9

San Miguel Beermen 94, Purefoods Hotdogs 92
San Miguel wins series, 4–3

The ULTRA, Pasig
