= 1985 PBA Reinforced Conference =

Philippine basketball tournament

- Duration: September 8 – November 28, 1985
- TV partner(s): Vintage Sports (MBS)

Finals
- Champions: Northern Cement (NCC)
- Runners-up: Manila Beer Brewmasters

Awards
- Best Import: Michael Hackett (Ginebra San Miguel)

PBA Reinforced Conference chronology
- 1986 >

PBA conference chronology
- < 1985 All-Filipino 1986 Reinforced >

The 1985 Philippine Basketball Association (PBA) Reinforced Conference was the third and last conference of the 1985 PBA season. It started on September 8 and ended on November 28, 1985. The tournament is an import-laden format, which requires an import or a pure-foreign player for each team.

== Format ==
The following format was observed for the duration of the conference:

- Double-round robin eliminations; 12 games per team; Teams were then seeded by basis on win–loss records.
- Team with the worst record after the elimination round was eliminated. The top two teams advanced outright to the semifinals.
- The next four teams qualified to the single round robin quarterfinals. Results from the eliminations were carried over. The top two teams advanced to the semifinals.
- Semifinals were a double round robin affair with the four remaining teams. The top two teams in the semifinals advanced to the best-of-seven finals. The last two teams disputed the third-place trophy in a best-of-seven series.

== Elimination round ==
Pos	Team	W	L	PCT	GB	Qualification
1	Manila Beer Brewmasters	9	3	.750	—	Advance to semifinal round
2	Ginebra San Miguel	7	5	.583 (Note: Head-to-head quotient: Magnolia 1.033, Ginebra 1.000, Northern 0.967; semifinal berth playoffs: Ginebra 99–96 Northern, Ginebra 106–98 Magnolia)	2	Advance to semifinal round
3	Magnolia Quench Plus	7	5	.583	2	Proceed to quarterfinal round
4	Northern Cement (G)	7	5	.583	2	Proceed to quarterfinal round
5	Great Taste Coffee Makers	6	6	.500	3	Proceed to quarterfinal round
6	Tanduay Rhum Makers	4	8	.333	5	Proceed to quarterfinal round
7	Shell Azodrin Bugbusters	2	10	.167	7	

(G) Guests

== Semifinal round berth playoffs ==
With the three-way tie for second and the last outright semifinal round berth, a two-round playoff was held to determine which team will qualify to the semifinals outright; the losers in each round proceed to the quarterfinals.

=== First round ===
Vintage

October 22

Ginebra San Miguel 99, Northern Cement 96
Scoring by quarter: 23-22, 23–28, 22–24, 31-22
Pts: Michael Hackett 34

The ULTRA, Pasig

With 4:52 left in the second period, Jaworski caught a wayward elbow from Jeff Moore during a rebound play. This opened a big cut on Big J's upper lip. He had to be rushed at the Medical City hospital for treatment. The cut lip allegedly required nine stitches.

Jaworski return to the game late in the third quarter. The Gins were only down by six, 68–74, at the end of the quarter. Teaming up with Francis Arnaiz, the Big J put Ginebra ahead, 89–86, after completing a three-point play with 6:08 left. From there, it was nip and tuck, Jaworski nailed Ginebra's final basket for the final count.

=== Second round ===
Vintage

October 24

Ginebra San Miguel 106, Magnolia Quench Plus 98
Scoring by quarter: 27-26, 23-21, 25–27, 31-24
Pts: Michael Hackett 48; Rebs: Michael Hackett 25	Pts: Norman Black 45

The ULTRA, Pasig

Ginebra took a commanding 12-point advantage, 63-51, in the early going of the third period. The lead was narrowed to a solitary point by the Thirst Quenchers at the end of the third quarter.

== Quarterfinal round ==
Pos	Team	W	L	PCT	GB	Qualification
3	Northern Cement (G)	9	6	.600	—	Semifinal round
4	Great Taste Coffee Makers	8	7	.533 (Note: Semifinal berth playoff: Great Taste 99–95 Magnolia)	1	Semifinal round
5	Magnolia Quench Plus	8	7	.533	1	
6	Tanduay Rhum Makers	5	10	.333	4	

(G) Guests

== Semifinal round berth playoff ==
Vintage

November 3

Great Taste Coffee Makers 99, Magnolia Quench Plus 95

The ULTRA, Pasig

== Semifinal round ==
Pos	Team	W	L	PCT	GB	Qualification
1	Manila Beer Brewmasters	4	2	.667	—	Advance to the finals
2	Northern Cement (G)	3	3	.500 (Note: Second-seed playoff, Northern 123–107 Great Taste)	1	Advance to the finals
3	Great Taste Coffee Makers	3	3	.500	1	Proceed to third-place playoff
4	Ginebra San Miguel	2	4	.333	2	Proceed to third-place playoff

(G) Guests

=== Results ===
Teams	GIN	GTC	MB	NCC
Ginebra San Miguel	—	117–124	121–107	101–97
Great Taste Coffee Makers	138–130	—	126–130	102–97
Manila Beer Brewmasters	127–117	117–105	—	95–130
Northern Consolidated Cement	115–108	125–102	93–99	—

Legend: Blue = left column team win; Red = top row team win.
Matches with lighter background shading were decided after overtime.

== Second seed playoff ==
Vintage

November 19

Northern Cement 123, Great Taste Coffee Makers 107

The ULTRA, Pasig

== Third place playoffs ==
Vintage

November 21

Great Taste Coffee Makers 168, Ginebra San Miguel 197
Scoring by quarter: 36–53, 28-32, 42–57, 62–55
Pts: Ricardo Brown 42 Abe King 40	Pts: Michael Hackett 103

The ULTRA, Pasig

Vintage

November 24

Great Taste Coffee Makers 133, Ginebra San Miguel 139
Scoring by quarter: 24–34, 29–31, 39–38, 41–36
Pts: Ricardo Brown 57	Pts: Arnie Tuadles 42 Michael Hackett 35

The ULTRA, Pasig

Vintage

November 26

Great Taste Coffee Makers 126, Ginebra San Miguel 155
Scoring by quarter: 29–34, 32–38, 23–39, 42–44
Pts: Ricardo Brown 22	Pts: Michael Hackett 52

The ULTRA, Pasig

Vintage

November 28

Great Taste Coffee Makers 124, Ginebra San Miguel 145
Scoring by quarter: 29–34, 25–34, 33–45, 37–32
Pts: Abe King 28	Pts: Michael Hackett 40 Joey Marquez 26
Ginebra wins series, 4–0

The ULTRA, Pasig

== Finals ==
Vintage

November 21

Northern Cement 139, Manila Beer Brewmasters 102

The ULTRA, Pasig

Vintage

November 24

Northern Cement 133, Manila Beer Brewmasters 117

The ULTRA, Pasig

Vintage

November 26

Northern Cement 130, Manila Beer Brewmasters 113

The ULTRA, Pasig

Vintage

November 28

Northern Cement 138, Manila Beer Brewmasters 106
Northern wins series, 4–0

The ULTRA, Pasig
