= 1985 PBA All-Filipino Conference =

- Duration: June 23 – August 20, 1985
- TV partner(s): Vintage Sports (MBS)

Finals
- Champions: Great Taste Coffee Makers
- Runners-up: Shell Azodrin Bugbusters

PBA All-Filipino Conference chronology
- 1986 >

PBA conference chronology
- < 1985 Open 1985 Reinforced >

The 1985 Philippine Basketball Association (PBA) PBA All-Filipino Conference was the second conference of the 1985 PBA season. It started on June 23 and ended on August 20, 1985. The tournament is an All-Filipino format, which doesn't require an import or a pure-foreign player for each team.

== Format ==
The following format will be observed for the duration of the conference:

- Double-round robin eliminations; 10 games per team.
- The top four teams will qualify in a double round carry-over semifinals.
- The top two teams in the semifinals advance to the best-of-five finals. The last two teams dispute the third-place trophy in a best-of-five series.

== Elimination round ==
Pos	Team	W	L	PCT	GB	Qualification
1	Great Taste Coffee Makers	8	2	.800	—	Semifinal round
2	Shell Azodrin Bugbusters	5	5	.500	3	Semifinal round
3	Tanduay Rhum Makers	5	5	.500	3	Semifinal round
4	Ginebra San Miguel	5	5	.500	3	Semifinal round
5	Manila Beer Brewmasters	4	6	.400	4	
6	Magnolia Ice Cream Makers	3	7	.300	5	

== Semifinal round ==
Pos	Team	W	L	PCT	GB	Qualification
1	Great Taste Coffee Makers	12	4	.750	—	Advance to the finals
2	Shell Azodrin Bugbusters	8	8	.500 (Note: Second-seed playoff: Shell 89–76 Ginebra)	4	Advance to the finals
3	Ginebra San Miguel	8	8	.500	4	Proceed to third-place playoff
4	Tanduay Rhum Makers	7	9	.438	5	Proceed to third-place playoff

== Second seed playoff ==
Vintage

August 11

Shell Azodrin 89, Ginebra San Miguel 76

The ULTRA, Pasig

== Third place playoffs ==
Vintage

August 13

Tanduay Rhum Makers 115, Ginebra San Miguel 122 (OT)
Scoring by quarter: 24–21, 28–29, 29–17, 25–39, Overtime: 9–16
Pts: Abet Guidaben 28	Pts: Arnaiz 21 Clarino 21

The ULTRA, Pasig

Vintage

August 15

Tanduay Rhum Makers 110, Ginebra San Miguel 108
Scoring by quarter: 29–23, 28–32, 24–30, 29–23
Pts: Hubalde 31 Guidaben 30	Pts: Francis Arnaiz 23

The ULTRA, Pasig

Vintage

August 18

Tanduay Rhum Makers 106, Ginebra San Miguel 97
Scoring by quarter: 23–21, 22–25, 22–24, 39–27
Pts: Guidaben 30 Generalao 26	Pts: Francis Arnaiz 24

The ULTRA, Pasig

Vintage

August 20

Tanduay Rhum Makers 102, Ginebra San Miguel 104
Scoring by quarter: 26–26, 26–28, 23–27, 27–23
Pts: Abet Guidaben 38	Pts: Joey Marquez 20
Series aborted with series tied 2–2; Tanduay wins series by scoring more points 433–431 when series was aborted

The ULTRA, Pasig

== Finals ==
Vintage

August 13

Great Taste Coffee Makers 103, Shell Azodrin 98

The ULTRA, Pasig

Vintage

August 15

Great Taste Coffee Makers 113, Shell Azodrin 106

The ULTRA, Pasig

Vintage

August 18

Great Taste Coffee Makers 102, Shell Azodrin 103

The ULTRA, Pasig

Vintage

August 20

Great Taste Coffee Makers 110, Shell Azodrin 91
Great Taste wins series, 3–1

The ULTRA, Pasig
