= 1985 Shell Azodrin Bugbusters season =

- Head coach: Freddie Webb
- General manager: Ernie Inocencio
- Owners: Pilipinas Shell, Inc.

Open Conference results
- Record: 4–11 (26.7%)
- Place: 6th
- Playoff finish: Quarterfinals

All-Filipino Conference results
- Record: 10–11 (47.6%)
- Place: 2nd
- Playoff finish: Finals (lost to Great Taste)

Reinforced Conference results
- Record: 2–10 (16.7%)
- Place: 7th
- Playoff finish: Eliminated

Shell Azodrin Bugbusters seasons

The 1985 Shell Azodrin Bugbusters season was the 1st season of the franchise in the Philippine Basketball Association (PBA).

== New team ==
Pilipinas Shell Corporation bought out the lock, stock and barrel of the famed Crispa Redmanizers, the winningest ballclub which disbanded as the league enters its 11th season. The newest member to be known as Shell Chemicals or Shell Azodrin retained only four Redmanizers namely Philip Cezar, Bernie Fabiosa, Arturo Cristobal and Willie Pearson. They were able to acquire three-time MVP William Adornado from Great Taste when they traded the 1984 Rookie of the year Willie Pearson in exchange.

Shell got six rookies who were amateur standouts, three of them were former PABL MVPs, 6-5 center Sonny Cabatu, the two-time PABL MVP and the pro league's number one overall pick in the first-ever rookie draft, 1983 PABL Founders Cup MVP Manuel Luis Marquez, a 1984 youth campaigner, and 1984 PABL Ambassador's Cup MVP Leo Austria, a 1982 RP Youth stalwart. Their other three top-rated rookies were Romeo Ang, Aldo Perez and Menardo Jubinal.

Former Yco amateur team coach Freddie Webb, who last coached the Tanduay team in 1983 and who wound up as Vintage panelist in the previous year was Shell's choice to call the shots for the Bugbusters, which got their monicker through the megahit film Ghostbusters. Shell opened their first conference campaign with Kevin Graham as its import, they lost their first two games and Graham was replaced by the returning, former N-Rich and SMB import Rich Adams.

== Finals stint ==
The Shell Bugbusters played in the PBA finals in only their second participated tournament during the All-Filipino Conference. They lost to defending champion Great Taste Coffee Makers in four games of the best-of-five title playoffs.

== Awards ==
- Bogs Adornado made it to the Mythical five selection as he finish second to eventual MVP winner Ricardo Brown of Great Taste in the race for the Most Valuable Player trophy.
- Leo Austria won the season's Rookie of the year honors.

== Won-loss records vs Opponents ==
Team	Win	Loss	1st (Open)	2nd (All-Filipino)	3rd (Reinforced)
Ginebra	4	5	2-0	2-3	0-2
Great Taste	4	8	1-1	3-5	0-2
Magnolia	4	3	1-2	2-0	1-1
Manila Beer	1	6	0-3	1-1	0-2
Northern (NCC)	1	4	0-3	N/A	1-1
Tanduay	2	6	0-2	2-2	0-2
Total	16	32	4-11	10-11	2-10

== Roster ==
1985 Shell Azodrin Bugbusters roster
Players

Pos.	#	POB	Name	Height	Weight	DOB (YYYY–MM–DD)	From
C	5	(Philippines)	Sonny Cabatu	6 ft 5 in (1.96 m)			PSBA
G	7	(Philippines)	Arturo Cristobal	6 ft 1 in (1.85 m)			Far Eastern
G	10	(Philippines)	Romeo Ang	6 ft 1 in (1.85 m)			Letran
C	11	(Philippines)	Menardo Jubinal	6 ft 4 in (1.93 m)			Mapúa
F	12	(Philippines)	Rey Lazaro	6 ft 2 in (1.88 m)			Far Eastern
G	13	(Philippines)	Leo Austria	5 ft 10 in (1.78 m)			Lyceum
F	17	(Philippines)	Manuel Marquez	6 ft 2 in (1.88 m)			San Beda
F	26	(Philippines)	Aldo Perez	6 ft 3 in (1.91 m)			De La Salle
G/F	33	(Philippines)	Bogs Adornado	6 ft 1 in (1.85 m)			UST
F	42	(Philippines)	Dennis Abbatuan	6 ft 2 in (1.88 m)			José Rizal
G	51	(Philippines)	Bernie Fabiosa	5 ft 9 in (1.75 m)			UE
C	52	(Philippines)	Jaime Javier	6 ft 5 in (1.96 m)			José Rizal
F	81	(Philippines)	Philip Cezar	6 ft 3 in (1.91 m)			José Rizal

Coaches

Head coach

- (Philippines) Freddie Webb

Assistant coach(es)

- (Philippines) Frederick Gonzales

Legend

- (C) Team captain
- Injured

=== Subtraction ===
Player	Number	Position	Height	New Team
Alberto Gutierrez	3	Forward	6 ft 2 in (1.88 m)	Tanduay Rhum

=== Imports ===
Name	Conference	No.	Pos.	Ht.	College
Kevin Graham	Open Conference	32	Center-Forward	6"8'	GWU
Rich Adams	Open Conference	40	Center-Forward	6"9'	UIUC
Howard Carter	Reinforced Conference	32	Forward	6"5'	LSU
Lester Rowe	Reinforced Conference	24	Forward	6"5'	WVU
