= 1985 PBA Open Conference finals =

Team	Coach	Wins
Great Taste Coffee Makers	Baby Dalupan	4
Magnolia Ice Cream Makers	Norman Black	2
- Dates: May 19–30, 1985
- Television: Vintage Sports (MBS)
- Radio network: DZRP/DZFM

PBA Open Conference finals chronology
- 1986 >

The 1985 PBA Open Conference finals was the best-of-7 basketball championship series of the 1985 PBA Open Conference, and the conclusion of the conference playoffs. The Great Taste Coffee Makers and Magnolia Ice Cream Makers played for the 30th championship contested by the league.

The Great Taste Coffee Makers captured their third straight PBA title with a 4–2 series win against Magnolia Ice Cream.

== Qualification ==
Great Taste		Magnolia
Finished 8–4 (.667), tied for 1st	Eliminations	Finished 7–5 (.583), tied for 2nd
Outright semis	Quarterfinals	Finished 9–6 (.600)
Finished 5–1 (.833), 1st	Semifinals	Finished 4–2 (.667), 2nd

== Series scoring summary ==
Team	Game 1	Game 2	Game 3	Game 4	Game 5	Game 6	Wins
Great Taste	108	105	103	93	121	122	4
Magnolia	99	111	97	95	95	104	2
Venue	ULTRA	ULTRA	ULTRA	ULTRA	ULTRA	ULTRA

== Games summary ==
=== Game 1 ===
Vintage

May 19

Great Taste Coffee Makers 108, Magnolia Ice Cream 99
Scoring by quarter: 25–22, 24–22, 37–21, 22–34
Pts: Ricardo Brown 27	Pts: Norman Black 32

The ULTRA, Pasig

Great Taste were only up by five points at halftime, 49–44, Ricardo Brown got the Coffee Makers to a 6–0 start in the opening minutes of the third period, by the end of the quarter, the Coffee Makers erected a 21-point lead at 86–65. Magnolia were able to narrowed down the gap with barely three minutes remaining in the game when Great Taste coach Baby Dalupan pulled out his starters with the Coffee Makers still enjoying a 19-point bubble, a finishing 11–2 run by the Ice Cream Makers in the last 60 seconds made their defeat a more respectable tally.

=== Game 2 ===
Vintage

May 21

Great Taste Coffee Makers 105, Magnolia Ice Cream 111
Scoring by quarter: 23–27, 28–26, 24–23, 30–35

The ULTRA, Pasig

From an 81-all deadlock with 9:41 to go in the final period, Norman Black scored five straight points that started several eight-point margins by Magnolia, just before the last two minutes of the ballgame, the Coffee Makers were able to close within 98–101, on Willie Pearson's jumper. Biboy Ravanes scored the last 11 points for Magnolia, six of which from the foul line during the final 56 seconds.

=== Game 3 ===
Vintage

May 23

Great Taste Coffee Makers 103, Magnolia Ice Cream 97
Scoring by quarter: 29–27, 26–23, 27–25, 21–22
Pts: Joe Binion 38	Pts: Norman Black 35

The ULTRA, Pasig

Marte Saldaña racked up seven consecutive points at the start of the fourth period to spark a Magnolia rally, the game remain close until the last five minutes, Abe King scored on a follow-up which gave the Coffee Makers a 100–93 lead for good.

=== Game 4 ===
Vintage

May 26

Great Taste Coffee Makers 93, Magnolia Ice Cream 95
Scoring by quarter: 20–25, 25–29, 27–20, 21–21
Pts: Joe Binion 30	Pts: Norman Black 37

The ULTRA, Pasig

Magnolia established their biggest lead of 13 points at 58–45, early in the third period, Great Taste rallied to within two points, 72–74, after three quarters, the Coffee Makers grab the lead twice in the fourth period, the last at 83–82 with 6:51 left. Magnolia simply wouldn't buckle under pressure, Rudy Distrito hit a triple and Noli Banate converted on the assist by Joey Loyzaga to give the Ice Cream Makers more breathing room, Magnolia went ahead by eight points, 95–87, with two minutes remaining, and just when they had the game in the bag, the Coffee Makers answered with Joel Banal hitting a three-pointer, Ricardo Brown converting two free throws and Joe Binion's split charities makes it 95–93 for Magnolia with 1:09 left, Dante Gonzalgo of Magnolia missed a jumper with 22 seconds to go but they prevent Great Taste from making a field goal by fouling and the Ice Cream Makers not yet in penalty situation, Ricardo Brown missed his final attempt and Biboy Ravanes came down with the rebound at the buzzer.

=== Game 5 ===
Vintage

May 28

Great Taste Coffee Makers 121, Magnolia Ice Cream 95
Scoring by quarter: 32–15, 24–19, 31–28, 34–33
Pts: Ricardo Brown 41	Pts: Black 21 E. Loyzaga 21

The ULTRA, Pasig

Great Taste took an early 21-point lead in the first quarter, 32–11, the Coffee Makers padded that margin to as large as 32 points, 78–46 in the third quarter, the closest Magnolia could get within was 17 points at 80–97. Ricardo Brown had a conference-high of 41 points for Great Taste while Norman Black of Magnolia was held down to his conference low of 21 points.

=== Game 6 ===
Vintage

May 30

Great Taste Coffee Makers 122, Magnolia Ice Cream 104
Scoring by quarter: 37–29, 19–23, 30–28, 36–24
Pts: Ricardo Brown 39	Pts: Norman Black 44
Great Taste wins series, 4–2

The ULTRA, Pasig

The Coffee Makers unveiled its superiority and withstood the pressure, after being threatened twice in the game, Magnolia came back from an eight-point deficit in the third quarter to grab the upper hand, 70–68, the Ice Cream Makers last tasted the lead at 87–86, when Great Taste came up with a 9–0 blast to take a 95–87 advantage, another 10–3 run by the Coffee Makers stretched their lead to 105–90 as the sell-out crowd on hand smells victory for Great Taste.

1985 PBA Open Conference Champions

Great Taste Coffee Makers
Third title

== Rosters ==
Great Taste Coffee roster
Players
Coaches

Pos.	No.	Nat.	Name	Ht.	Wt.
C	1	(Philippines)	Manny Victorino	6 ft 5 in (1.96 m)		José Rizal
G/F	2	(Philippines)	Alejo Alolor	6 ft 1 in (1.85 m)		Visayas
G/F	3	(Philippines)	Oliveros Dalman	6 ft 2 in (1.88 m)		Visayas
G	4	(Philippines)	Frankie Lim (injured)	5 ft 11 in (1.80 m)		San Beda
F	6	(Philippines)	Abe King	6 ft 3 in (1.91 m)		San Beda
C	7	(Philippines)	Joel Banal	6 ft 5 in (1.96 m)		Mapúa
G	11	(Philippines)	Jaime Manansala	5 ft 11 in (1.80 m)		UE
F	14	(Philippines)	Chito Loyzaga	6 ft 3 in (1.91 m)		San Beda
G	18	(Philippines)	Lawrence Merced	6 ft 0 in (1.83 m)		Adamson
C	20	(Philippines)	Teodicio Alfarero	6 ft 4 in (1.93 m)		De La Salle
G	23	(United States)	Ricardo Brown	5 ft 11 in (1.80 m)		Pepperdine
F	29	(Philippines)	Bernardo Carpio	6 ft 3 in (1.91 m)		Ateneo
C	30	(United States)	Joe Binion (I)	6 ft 8 in (2.03 m)		North Carolina A&T
F	33	(United States)	William Pearson	6 ft 1 in (1.85 m)		Chaminade

Head coach

- (Philippines) Baby Dalupan

Assistant coach(es)

- (Philippines) Jimmy Mariano

Legend

- (C) Team captain
- (I) Import
- Injured

Magnolia Ice Cream roster
Players
Coaches

Pos.	No.	Nat.	Name	Ht.	Wt.
G	5	(Philippines)	Biboy Ravanes	6 ft 0 in (1.83 m)		Cebu
F	6	(Philippines)	Jesus Migalbin	6 ft 3 in (1.91 m)		San Agustin
G	7	(Philippines)	Marte Saldaña	5 ft 11 in (1.80 m)		Far Eastern
C	8	(Philippines)	Noli Banate	6 ft 5 in (1.96 m)		Mindanao
F	9	(Philippines)	Renato Lobo	6 ft 2 in (1.88 m)		Far Eastern
G/F	10	(Philippines)	Dante Gonzalgo	6 ft 1 in (1.85 m)		Lyceum
F	13	(Philippines)	Manny Paner	6 ft 3 in (1.91 m)		Visayas
G	14	(Philippines)	Joey Loyzaga	6 ft 1 in (1.85 m)		San Beda
C	20	(Philippines)	Carlson Samlani	6 ft 5 in (1.96 m)		San Sebastian
F/C	24	(United States)	Norman Black (I)	6 ft 5 in (1.96 m)		Saint Joseph's
G	37	(Philippines)	Bokyo Lauchengco	6 ft 0 in (1.83 m)		Far Eastern
G	44	(Philippines)	Rudy Distrito	5 ft 11 in (1.80 m)		UE

Head coach

- (United States) Norman Black

Assistant coach(es)

- (Philippines) Derrick Pumaren

Legend

- (C) Team captain
- (I) Import
- Injured

== Broadcast notes ==
Game	Play-by-play	Analyst
Game 1		
Game 2		
Game 3		
Game 4		
Game 5		
Game 6	Joe Cantada	Andy Jao
