= 1985 PBA Open Conference =

- Duration: March 3 – May 30, 1985
- TV partner(s): Vintage Sports (MBS)

Finals
- Champions: Great Taste Coffee Makers
- Runners-up: Magnolia Ice Cream Makers

Awards
- Best Import: Norman Black (Magnolia Ice Cream Makers)

PBA Open Conference chronology
- 1986 >

PBA conference chronology
- < 1984 Invitational 1985 All-Filipino >

The 1985 Philippine Basketball Association (PBA) Open Conference was the first conference of the 1985 PBA season. It started on March 3 and ended on May 30, 1985. The tournament is an import-laden format, which requires an import or a pure-foreign player for each team.

== Format ==
The following format will be observed for the duration of the conference:

- Double-round robin eliminations; 12 games per team; Teams are then seeded by basis on win–loss records.
- Team with the worst record after the elimination round will be eliminated. The top two teams will advance outright to the semifinals.
- The next four teams will qualify to the single round robin quarterfinals. Results from the eliminations will be carried over. The top two teams will advance to the semifinals.
- Semifinals will be a double round robin affair with the four remaining teams. The top two teams in the semifinals advance to the best-of-seven finals. The last two teams dispute the third-place trophy in a best-of-seven series.

== Elimination round ==
Pos	Team	W	L	PCT	GB	Qualification
1	Great Taste Coffee Makers	8	4	.667	—	Advance to semifinal round
2	Tanduay Rhum Makers	8	4	.667	—	Advance to semifinal round
3	Magnolia Ice Cream Makers	7	5	.583	1	Proceed to quarterfinal round
4	Northern Cement (G)	7	5	.583	1	Proceed to quarterfinal round
5	Manila Beer Brewmasters	5	7	.417	3	Proceed to quarterfinal round
6	Shell Azodrin Bugbusters	4	8	.333	4	Proceed to quarterfinal round
7	Ginebra San Miguel	3	9	.250	5	

(G) Guests

== Quarterfinal round ==
Pos	Team	W	L	PCT	GB	Qualification
3	Magnolia Ice Cream Makers	9	6	.600	—	Semifinal round
4	Northern Cement (G)	8	7	.533 (Note: Semifinal berth playoff: Northern Cement 98–75 Manila Beer)	1	Semifinal round
5	Manila Beer Brewmasters	8	7	.533	1	
6	Shell Azodrin Bugbusters	4	11	.267	5	

(G) Guests

== Semifinal round berth playoff ==
Vintage

May 2

Northern (NCC) 98, Manila Beer Brewmasters 75

The ULTRA, Pasig

== Semifinal round ==
Pos	Team	W	L	PCT	GB	Qualification
1	Great Taste Coffee Makers	5	1	.833	—	Advance to the Finals
2	Magnolia Ice Cream Makers	4	2	.667	1	Advance to the Finals
3	Northern Cement (G)	3	3	.500	2	Proceed to third place playoff
4	Tanduay Rhum Makers	0	6	.000	5	Proceed to third place playoff

(G) Guests

== Third place playoffs ==
Vintage

May 19

Northern (NCC) 107, Tanduay Rhum Makers 112

The ULTRA, Pasig

Vintage

May 21

Northern (NCC) 110, Tanduay Rhum Makers 98
Scoring by quarter: 26-19, 21–27, 30-28, 33-24
Pts: Jeff Moore 36	Pts: David Pope 36

The ULTRA, Pasig

Vintage

May 23

Northern (NCC) 100, Tanduay Rhum Makers 93
Scoring by quarter: 32-20, 19–26, 24–25, 25-22
Pts: Allan Caidic 21	Pts: David Pope 27

The ULTRA, Pasig

Vintage

May 26

Northern (NCC) 104, Tanduay Rhum Makers 110
Scoring by quarter: 27-27, 29-27, 22–31, 26-25
Pts: Dennis Still 24	Pts: Guidaben 22 Hubalde 22

The ULTRA, Pasig

Vintage

May 28

Northern (NCC) 113, Tanduay Rhum Makers 82
Scoring by quarter: 20–29, 28-13, 28-23, 37-17
Pts: Samboy Lim 22	Pts: David Pope 22

The ULTRA, Pasig

Vintage

May 30

Northern (NCC) 121, Tanduay Rhum Makers 110
Scoring by quarter: 39-32, 27-21, 29–32, 26-25
Pts: Samboy Lim 34	Pts: David Pope 40
Northern wins series, 4–2

The ULTRA, Pasig

== Finals ==
Vintage

May 19

Great Taste Coffee Makers 108, Magnolia Ice Cream 99

The ULTRA, Pasig

Vintage

May 21

Great Taste Coffee Makers 105, Magnolia Ice Cream 111

The ULTRA, Pasig

Vintage

May 23

Great Taste Coffee Makers 103, Magnolia Ice Cream 97

The ULTRA, Pasig

Vintage

May 26

Great Taste Coffee Makers 93, Magnolia Ice Cream 95

The ULTRA, Pasig

Vintage

May 28

Great Taste Coffee Makers 121, Magnolia Ice Cream 95

The ULTRA, Pasig

Vintage

May 30

Great Taste Coffee Makers 122, Magnolia Ice Cream 104
Great Taste wins series, 4–2

The ULTRA, Pasig
