= 1986 PBA Open Conference finals =

Team	Coach	Wins
Ginebra San Miguel	Robert Jaworski	4
Manila Beer Brewmasters	Tito Eduque	1
- Dates: December 2–11, 1986
- Television: Vintage Sports (PTV)
- Radio network: DZSR

PBA Open Conference finals chronology
- < 1985 1987 >

The 1986 PBA Open Conference finals was the best-of-7 series basketball championship of the 1986 PBA Open Conference, and the conclusion of the conference playoffs. Ginebra San Miguel and Manila Beer Brewmasters played for the 35th championship contested by the league.

Ginebra San Miguel won their first championship since joining the league in 1979 with a 4–1 series victory over Manila Beer Brewmasters.

== Qualification ==
Ginebra		Manila Beer
Finished 9–3 (.750)	Eliminations	Finished 9–3 (.750)
Outright semis	Quarterfinals	Outright semis
Finished 4–1 (.800)	Semifinals	Finished 4–1 (.800)

== Series scoring summary ==
Team	Game 1	Game 2	Game 3	Game 4	Game 5	Wins
Ginebra	135	111	139	145	130	4
Manila Beer	133	121	130	135	120	1
Venue	ULTRA	ULTRA	ULTRA	ULTRA	ULTRA

== Games summary ==
=== Game 1 ===
Vintage

December 2

Ginebra San Miguel 135, Manila Beer Brewmasters 133
Scoring by quarter: 33–31, 23–34, 33–39, 46–29
Pts: Billy Ray Bates 52	Pts: Michael Young 50 Harold Keeling 50

The ULTRA, Pasig

Ginebra came roaring back from a 20-point deficit and won on a shattering dunk by Billy Ray Bates at the buzzer, It was a bitter defeat for the Brewmasters, which led 91–71 with five minutes left in the third quarter and were ahead, 104–89, going into the final period, Bates and Hackett teamed up with Terry Saldaña to put Ginebra within striking distance, 108–120, going into the last six minutes of play, a 13–6 attack sparked by Michael Hackett put the Gins only within five points, 121–126, with three minutes to go and the crowd on the edge of their seats, bracing for that impending pulsating finish.

Chito Loyzaga hit a three-pointer to level the score at 131-all in the last 53 seconds, Michael Young struck on a pressure-filled jumper to make it 133–131 for Manila Beer, but the Ginebras came out of a timeout and tied the count at 133-all, through Billy Ray Bates' unchallenged drive with 33 seconds remaining, the Brewmasters worked out a make-or-break offensive that Harold Keeling fumbled on a drive, the Gins controlled possession in the last eight seconds, Robert Jaworski raced down the court and issued a crucial pass on Billy Ray Bates, who converted the game winning slam dunk. The loss by Manila Beer squandered the combined 100-point output of Harold Keeling and Michael Young, Manila Beer coach Tito Eduque left the venue in a huff after the Brewmasters' devastating loss.

=== Game 2 ===
Vintage

December 4

Ginebra San Miguel 111, Manila Beer Brewmasters 121
Scoring by quarter: 20–28, 34–28, 21–38, 36–27
Pts: Billy Ray Bates 45	Pts: Michael Young 43

The ULTRA, Pasig

The Brewmasters went up by 19 points after three quarters, 94–75, as in their previous encounters, the never-say-die Ginebras keeps coming back, the Gins close to within four points, 101–105, Michael Young converted on a basket that started a 9–1 run by Manila Beer and pushed their lead back to 12 points at 114–102, the Brewmasters weathered the storm and survived the Ginebra juggernaut to finally prevail over the Gins for the first time in the conference.

=== Game 3 ===
Vintage

December 7

Ginebra San Miguel 139, Manila Beer Brewmasters 130
Scoring by quarter: 34–30, 33–29, 34–39, 38–32
Pts: Billy Ray Bates 51 Robert Jaworski 28	Pts: Michael Young 51

The ULTRA, Pasig

A jumpshot by Harold Keeling made it 110–107 for the Brewmasters. Billy Ray Bates went on a scoring rampage by pumping in 11 big points to put Ginebra on top, 120–115. The Ginebras went up by 10, 129–119, on Sonny Jaworski's triple, who punctuated a high scoring performance of 28 points with six triples.

=== Game 4 ===
Vintage

December 9

Ginebra San Miguel 145, Manila Beer Brewmasters 135 (2OT)
Pts: Billy Ray Bates 59	Pts: Michael Young 63

The ULTRA, Pasig

Ginebra streak to a 99–91 margin midway in the fourth period, but a fired-up Michael Young struck on four three-point shots in the fourth quarter and put the Brewmasters ahead, 116–114, on a looping jumper from the side with 12 seconds remaining in regulation, Robert Jaworski split his charities with nine seconds to go but Harold Keeling could also hit only one of two free throws for a 117–115 lead for Manila Beer, the Gins mounted a go-ahead offensive until Atoy Co fouled Billy Ray Bates with two seconds left, Ginebra sued for time to plot a game-tying offensive play, Michael Hackett rescued the Gins from an impending defeat with a turnaround jumper in the last two seconds against three Manila Beer defenders to send the game into overtime at 117-all.

In the extension period, with the score at 127–125 in favor of Ginebra, Michael Young hit two of his 63 points in the last six seconds as he translate two errors by Ginebra playing coach Robert Jaworski to tie the count at 127-all, Young was fouled with one second remaining while attempting a three-pointer, sending him to the free throw line, Young converted his two charities and the game went into second overtime after Billy Ray Bates missed on an alley-hoop in the last offensive play, a decisive burst of six points from Dondon Ampalayo and Chito Loyzaga in the second extension finally give Ginebra the momentum at 135–129, the Brewmasters ran out of steam and gave up from sheer exhaustion in the gruelling overtime of a heart-stopping contest as Ginebra moved to within a win of capturing their first title, Billy Ray Bates and Michael Hackett played the whole game without relief and Robert Jaworski became the first local player to have played non-stop for 58 minutes.

=== Game 5 ===
Vintage

December 11

Ginebra San Miguel 130, Manila Beer Brewmasters 120
Scoring by quarter: 28–33, 35–21, 33–36, 34–30
Pts: Michael Hackett 45 Billy Ray Bates 31	Pts: Michael Young 43 Harold Keeling 35
Ginebra wins series, 4–1

The ULTRA, Pasig

Ginebra allowed Manila Beer to take the first quarter and then dominated the last 36 minutes of play, the Gins were up by nine, 63–54 at halftime, and got their biggest lead of 14 points in the third period, 75–61, the Brewmasters put up its own rally and were down by only six, 90–96, at the start of the final period, a triple by Billy Ray Bates gave Ginebra a 102–92 lead and their margin went back to 12 points at 108–96, in the first three minutes of the fourth quarter, the Brewmasters twice close the gap to within five points, 107–112, after Michael Young hit a three-pointer, and 109–114, Michael Hackett got away with an easy shot that started a breakaway of five straight points for Ginebra to up their lead to ten, 119–109, before a wildly cheering crowd of 12,000, Ginebra and Manila Beer traded baskets in a free-wheeling windup in the last two minutes and at the final buzzer, Billy Ray Bates and Michael Hackett poured champaigns to each other at center court as Ginebra celebrates their first championship after eight long years, Michael Hackett outscored Billy Ray Bates for only the second time in the conference, finishing with 45 points while Bates could only tally 31 markers.

1986 PBA Open Conference Champions

Ginebra San Miguel
First title

== Rosters ==
Ginebra San Miguel roster
Players
Coaches

Pos.	#	POB	Name	Height	Weight	DOB (YYYY–MM–DD)	From
F/C	00	(United States)	Michael Hackett (I)	6 ft 5 in (1.96 m)			Jacksonville
G/F	2	(United States)	Billy Ray Bates (I)	6 ft 3 in (1.91 m)			Kentucky State
G/F	3	(Philippines)	Joey Marquez	6 ft 1 in (1.85 m)			Angeles
G	5	(Philippines)	Mukesh Advani	5 ft 11 in (1.80 m)			San Beda
F	6	(Philippines)	Dondon Ampalayo	6 ft 3 in (1.91 m)			USJ–R
G	7	(Philippines)	Robert Jaworski	6 ft 1 in (1.85 m)			UE
G	9	(Philippines)	Leo Isaac	6 ft 1 in (1.85 m)			Mapúa
C	10	(Philippines)	Eduardo Ducut	6 ft 5 in (1.96 m)			Letran
C	11	(Philippines)	Romulo Mamaril	6 ft 6 in (1.98 m)			Mapúa
G/F	12	(Philippines)	Dante Gonzalgo	6 ft 2 in (1.88 m)			Lyceum
F	13	(Philippines)	Terry Saldaña	6 ft 3 in (1.91 m)			Letran
G	14	(Philippines)	Joey Loyzaga	6 ft 0 in (1.83 m)			San Beda
F	20	(Philippines)	Rolando Buhay	6 ft 3 in (1.91 m)			NCBA
F	41	(Philippines)	Chito Loyzaga	6 ft 3 in (1.91 m)			San Beda
G	77	(Philippines)	Rey Perez	6 ft 1 in (1.85 m)			Mapúa

Head coach

- (Philippines) Robert Jaworski

Assistant coach(es)

- (Philippines) Rino Salazar

Team manager

- (Philippines) Adolf Ferrer

Legend

- (C) Team captain
- (CI) Commissioner's Cup Import
- (GI) Governors' Cup Import
- (EI) EASL Import
- (DP) Unsigned draft pick
- (FA) Free agent
- (IN) Inactive
- (S) Suspended
- (R) Rookie
- (I) Import
- Injured

Manila Beer roster
Players
Coaches

Pos.	No.	Nat.	Name	Ht.	Wt.	Age
G/F	1	(United States)	Harold Keeling (I)	6 ft 3 in (1.91 m)			Santa Clara
F	2	(Philippines)	Jesus Migalbin	6 ft 3 in (1.91 m)			San Agustin
F	3	(Philippines)	Edgardo Cordero	6 ft 3 in (1.91 m)			UST
G	4	(Philippines)	Adonis Tierra	5 ft 10 in (1.78 m)			FEATI
C	5	(Philippines)	Abet Guidaben	6 ft 5 in (1.96 m)			USJ–R
G	6	(Philippines)	Fortunato Co, Jr	6 ft 0 in (1.83 m)			Mapúa
F	11	(Philippines)	Ricardo Cui	6 ft 3 in (1.91 m)			Lyceum
F	13	(Philippines)	Elpidio Villamin	6 ft 3 in (1.91 m)
F	16	(Philippines)	Angelito Esguerra	6 ft 2 in (1.88 m)			Letran
G	17	(Philippines)	Tito Varela	5 ft 11 in (1.80 m)			UE
G	24	(Philippines)	Ramon Cruz	5 ft 11 in (1.80 m)			UE
G/F	32	(Philippines)	Timoteo Coloso	6 ft 2 in (1.88 m)			Letran
G	36	(Philippines)	Ranulfo Robles	6 ft 1 in (1.85 m)			Letran
F	42	(United States)	Michael Young (I)	6 ft 6 in (1.98 m)			Houston

Head coach

- (Philippines) Tito Eduque

Assistant coach(es)

- (Philippines) Jun Celis
- (Philippines) Nemie Villegas

Legend

- (C) Team captain
- (I) Import
- Injured

== Broadcast notes ==
Game	Play-by-play	Analyst
Game 1	Joe Cantada	Norman Black
Game 2	Pinggoy Pengson	Steve Kattan
Game 3	Joe Cantada	Joaquin Henson
Game 4	Pinggoy Pengson	Quinito Henson
Game 5	Joe Cantada	Norman Black
