= List of Philippine Basketball Association season scoring leaders =

The Philippine Basketball Association season scoring leaders are the season by season individual scoring leaders of the Philippine Basketball Association (PBA) by a local (natural born Filipino). It originally started during the 1975 season, but it became an official award when the PBA Awards Press Corps started its official recognition of the award during the 2011–12 season.

Arvin Tolentino formerly of NorthPort Batang Pier will be honored as the PBA scoring champion by the PBA Press Corps (PBAPC).

== Scoring leaders ==
^	Denotes player who is still active in the PBA
*	Inducted into the Philippine Basketball Association Hall of Fame
†	Denotes player who won the Most Valuable Player award that year
Player (X)	Denotes the number of times the player had been the scoring leader up to and including that season

Season	Top Scorer	Team	PPG
1979†	Atoy Co*	Crispa Redmanizers	23.2
1980	Bogs Adornado*	U/Tex Wranglers	23.9
1981†	Bogs Adornado* (2)	U/Tex Wranglers	26.1
1982	Bogs Adornado* (3)	U/Tex Wranglers	27.4
1983	Ramon Fernandez*	Toyota Super Corollas	24.1
1984	Chip Engelland	Northern Cement	29.0
1984†	Ramon Fernandez* (2)	Toyota Super Corollas	27.8
1985†	Ricardo Brown*	Great Taste Coffee Makers	27.9
1986	Ricardo Brown* (2)	Great Taste Coffee Makers	23.9
1987	Ricardo Brown* (3)	Great Taste Coffee Makers	21.5
1988	Allan Caidic*	Presto Ice Cream Makers	21.8
1989	Allan Caidic* (2)	Presto Ice Cream Makers	27.4
1990†	Allan Caidic* (3)	Presto Tivolis	26.6
1991	Allan Caidic* (4)	Presto Tivolis	27.1
1992	Alvin Patrimonio*	Purefoods Tender Juicy Hotdogs	25.2
1993†	Alvin Patrimonio* (2)	Purefoods Tender Juicy Hotdogs	21.6
1994	Zandro Limpot	Sta. Lucia Realtors	22.0
1995	Allan Caidic* (5)	San Miguel Beermen	20.9
1996	Vergel Meneses	Sunkist Orange Bottlers	19.6
1997	Nelson Asaytono	San Miguel Beermen	23.1
1998	Alvin Patrimonio* (3)	Purefoods Tender Juicy Hotdogs	19.1
1999	Eric Menk	Tanduay Rhum Masters	20.1
2000	Eric Menk (2)	Tanduay Rhum Masters	24.2
2001	Eric Menk (3)	Tanduay Rhum Masters / Barangay Ginebra Kings	22.6
2002	Asi Taulava	Talk 'N Text Phone Pals	21.3
2003†	Asi Taulava (2)	Talk 'N Text Phone Pals	23.4
2004–05	Mark Caguioa	Barangay Ginebra Kings	18.7
2005–06	Mark Caguioa (2)	Barangay Ginebra Kings	20.6
2006–07	Mark Caguioa (3)	Barangay Ginebra Kings	24.6
2007–08	James Yap	Purefoods Tender Juicy Giants	21.3
2008–09	Mark Cardona	Talk 'N Text Tropang Texters	20.0
2009–10	Gary David	Coca-Cola Tigers	18.2
2010–11	Gary David (2)	Powerade Tigers	21.8
2011–12	Gary David (3)	Powerade Tigers	25.8
2012–13	Gary David (4)	GlobalPort Batang Pier	18.8
2013–14	Jayson Castro	Talk 'N Text Tropang Texters	16.8
2014–15	Terrence Romeo	GlobalPort Batang Pier	19.5
2015–16	Terrence Romeo (2)	GlobalPort Batang Pier	25.4
2016–17	Terrence Romeo (3)	GlobalPort Batang Pier	23.2
2017–18	Stanley Pringle	NorthPort Batang Pier	21.0
2019	CJ Perez	Columbian Dyip	20.8
2020	CJ Perez (2)	Terrafirma Dyip	24.4
2021	Mikey Williams	TNT Tropang Giga	19.8
2022–23	CJ Perez (3)	San Miguel Beermen	18.8
2023–24	Robert Bolick	NLEX Road Warriors	25.3
2024–25	Arvin Tolentino	NorthPort Batang Pier	21.2

== Multiple time winners ==
Total	Player	Years
5	(Philippines) Allan Caidic	1988-1991, 1995
4	(Philippines) Gary David	2010-2013
3	(United States) (Philippines) Ricardo Brown	1985-1987
3	(Philippines) Mark Caguioa	2005-2007
3	(Philippines) Bogs Adornado	1980-1982
3	(Philippines) Eric Menk	1999-2001
3	(Philippines) Alvin Patrimonio	1992, 1993, 1998
3	(Philippines) CJ Perez	2019, 2020, 2023
3	(Philippines) Terrence Romeo	2015, 2016, 2017
2	(Philippines) Ramon Fernandez	1983, 1984 (II)
2	(Philippines) Asi Taulava	2002, 2003

== See also ==
- List of Philippine Basketball Association awards
