= 1987 PBA Open Conference finals =

Team	Coach	Wins
Tanduay Rhum Makers	Arturo Valenzona	4
Great Taste Coffee Makers	Baby Dalupan	1
- Dates: June 14–23, 1987
- Television: Vintage Sports (PTV)
- Radio network: DZSR

Referees
- Game 2: G. Ledesma, E. Cruz, M. Felipe
- Game 4: G. Ledesma, E. Cruz, R. Besabe
- Game 5: G. Ledesma, D. Bayais, R. Besabe

PBA Open Conference finals chronology
- < 1986 1988 >

The 1987 PBA Open Conference finals was the best-of-7 series basketball championship of the 1987 PBA Open Conference, and the conclusion of the conference playoffs. The Tanduay Rhum Makers and Great Taste Coffee Makers played for the 36th championship contested by the league.

Tanduay Rhum Makers captured their third PBA title with a 4–1 series victory over Great Taste Coffee Makers.

== Qualification ==
Great Taste		Tanduay
Finished 10–2 (.833), 1st	Eliminations	Finished 9–3 (.750), tied for 2nd
Bye	Tiebreaker	Lost to Magnolia, 98–108
Bye	Quarterfinals	Finished 10–5 (.667), 1st
Finished 4–2 (.667), tied for 1st	Semifinals	Finished 4–2 (.667), tied for 1st

== Series scoring summary ==
Team	Game 1	Game 2	Game 3	Game 4	Game 5	Wins
Tanduay	118	135	114	113	134	4
Great Taste	114	134	120	112	120	1
Venue	ULTRA	ULTRA	ULTRA	ULTRA	ULTRA

== Games summary ==
=== Game 1 ===
Vintage

June 14
6:35 pm

Tanduay Rhum Makers 118, Great Taste Coffee Makers 114
Scoring by quarter: 21–28, 24–29, 38–32, 35–25
Pts: David Thirdkill 61	Pts: Michael Young 40 Ricardo Brown 30
Tanduay leads series, 1–0

The ULTRA, Pasig, Metro Manila

The Rhum Makers trailed by 16 points, 37–53, late in the second quarter, but were able to work their way back into the game as David Thirdkill exploded with 61 points, 37 of them in the final half as he outperformed his counterpart Michael Young, who was limited to only 8 points in the fourth quarter. The Coffee Makers had a chance to tie the count with the score at 116–114 in favor of Tanduay. Thirdkill's two free throws off a foul by Philip Cezar with five seconds left sealed the ballgame.

=== Game 2 ===
Vintage

June 16
6:35 pm

Tanduay Rhum Makers 135, Great Taste Coffee Makers 134 (OT)
Scoring by quarter: 23–35, 32–30, 33–30, 35–28, Overtime: 12–11
Pts: David Thirdkill 42 Freddie Hubalde 33	Pts: Allan Caidic 48 Michael Young 42
Tanduay leads series, 2–0

The ULTRA, Pasig, Metro Manila
Referees: G. Ledesma, E. Cruz, M. Felipe

The Rhum Makers battled back from several 16-point deficits, rookie Allan Caidic's hot hands, finishing with a conference-best 48 points, and an overtime period to break Great Taste's record of not being defeated twice in a row this season. Thirdkill had the chance of wrapping the game up for Tanduay in regulation but he missed the second of two free throw shots off Michael Young's fifth foul with eight seconds left, enabling Allan Caidic to force the game into overtime at 123-all with a fastbreak lay-up as the buzzer sounded. The Coffee Makers led, 132–129, with two minutes left in the extension period when Thirdkill scored four straight points as the Rhum Makers regain the upper hand. Freddie Hubalde, who scored 33 points, sink a jumper to give Tanduay a 135–132 edge with 29 seconds left. After a Great Taste timeout, a quick two points by Michael Young cut the deficit to just one, 134–135, but the Coffee Makers wasted so much time not fouling to stop the clock. With seven second left and Great Taste not yet in penalty situation, the Rhum Makers just dribbled the remaining seconds away.

=== Game 3 ===
Vintage

June 18
6:35 pm

Tanduay Rhum Makers 114, Great Taste Coffee Makers 120
Scoring by quarter: 18–36, 39–17, 29–30, 28–37
Pts: David Thirdkill 52	Pts: Michael Young 50
Tanduay leads series, 2–1

The ULTRA, Pasig, Metro Manila

Great Taste took an early 33–11 lead behind the perimeter shooting of Allan Caidic, Ricardo Brown and Michael Young. The Rhum Makers battled back and even led at halftime, 57–53. In the fourth period, the Coffee Makers went up, 115–108, with 2:10 remaining but David Thirdkill's pair of dunks closed the gap at 114–117. Ricardo Brown's three free throws, first from a technical foul on Thirdkill, and the last two on a chopping foul by Onchie Dela Cruz, sealed the win for Great Taste.

=== Game 4 ===
Vintage

June 21
6:35 pm

Tanduay Rhum Makers 113, Great Taste Coffee Makers 112
Scoring by quarter: 29–29, 32–33, 35–27, 17–23
Pts: David Thirdkill 48	Pts: Michael Young 32
Tanduay leads series, 3–1

The ULTRA, Pasig, Metro Manila
Referees: G. Ledesma, E. Cruz, R. Besabe

The Rhum Makers trailed, 100–106, with barely six minutes remaining when David Thirdkill took charge, firing half of his team's next 12 points and Great Taste was limited to a solitary point as Tanduay surge ahead, 112–107. Allan Caidic buried the last of his four triples to trimmed down Tanduay's deficit to two, 110–112. Thirdkill split his free throws off Michael Young's fifth foul to place the Rhum Makers ahead by three, 113–110, with nine seconds remaining. Michael Young came through with his own two free throws off a foul from Thirdkill with five seconds left, after converting his first bonus shot, Young intentionally miss his second free throw but the ball bounced high up and went in. Tanduay calls a timeout and from the inbound play, the Rhum Makers dribbled out the remaining seconds.

=== Game 5 ===
Vintage

June 23
6:35 pm

Tanduay Rhum Makers 134, Great Taste Coffee Makers 120
Scoring by quarter: 31–30, 29–35, 40–27, 34–28
Pts: David Thirdkill 59	Pts: Michael Young 42 Ricardo Brown 36
Tanduay wins series, 4–1

The ULTRA, Pasig, Metro Manila
Referees: G. Ledesma, D. Bayais, R. Besabe

Tanduay took a 27–17 lead in the first quarter but the Coffee Makers came to within a point, 30–31, at the end of first 12 minutes of play. Great Taste were up, 65–60 at halftime. In the third quarter, a big 18–2 run by the Rhum Makers to start the period gave them a 78–67 lead. The Rhum Makers answered every last-ditch effort by the Coffee Makers in the final quarter as Tanduay fans began celebrating with still two minutes left in the game on a well-preserved 14-point edge. The predominantly Tanduay crowd were singing the song "We Will Rock You" blasting through the loud speaker. The last five points of the Rhum Makers were highlighted by a triple from Ramon Fernandez and a dunk from David Thirdkill, there was still one second left when Great Taste players left the court as confetti rained the hardcourt celebrating the Elizalde ballclub's third championship in the last four conferences.

1987 PBA Open Conference Champions

Tanduay Rhum Makers
Third title

== Rosters ==
Tanduay Rhum Makers roster
Players
Coaches

Pos.	No.	Nat.	Name	Ht.	Wt.
F	3	(Philippines)	Edgardo Cordero	6 ft 3 in (1.91 m)		UST
G/F	5	(Philippines)	Steve Watson	6 ft 2 in (1.88 m)		Ateneo
G	7	(Philippines)	Antonio Torrente	6 ft 1 in (1.85 m)
G	9	(Philippines)	Ramon Dela Cruz	5 ft 11 in (1.80 m)		Philippine Christian
G/F	10	(Philippines)	Freddie Hubalde	6 ft 1 in (1.85 m)		Mapúa
C	11	(Philippines)	Cayetano Salazar	6 ft 5 in (1.96 m)		Letran
F	12	(Philippines)	Victor Sanchez	6 ft 3 in (1.91 m)		Mapúa
F	16	(Philippines)	Angelito Esguerra	6 ft 3 in (1.91 m)		Letran
F	17	(Philippines)	Padim Israel	6 ft 2 in (1.88 m)		Ateneo
C	19	(Philippines)	Ramon Fernandez	6 ft 4 in (1.93 m)		San Carlos
C	22	(United States)	David Thirdkill (I)	6 ft 6 in (1.98 m)		Bradley
F	24	(Philippines)	Jose Yango	6 ft 3 in (1.91 m)		San Beda
C	33	(Philippines)	Romulo Mamaril	6 ft 6 in (1.98 m)		Mapúa
G	42	(Philippines)	Willie Generalao	5 ft 9 in (1.75 m)		Visayas

Head coach

- (Philippines) Arturo Valenzona

Assistant coach(es)

- (Philippines) Ely Capacio

Legend

- (C) Team captain
- (I) Import
- Injured

Great Taste Coffee roster
Players
Coaches

Pos.	No.	Nat.	Name	Ht.	Wt.
F	5	(Philippines)	Aaron Torres	6 ft 2 in (1.88 m)		UE
F	6	(Philippines)	Abe King (injured)	6 ft 3 in (1.91 m)		San Beda
G/F	8	(Philippines)	Allan Caidic	6 ft 2 in (1.88 m)		UE
G/F	11	(Philippines)	Arnie Tuadles	6 ft 2 in (1.88 m)		Visayas
F	13	(Philippines)	Rey Ramos	6 ft 2 in (1.88 m)		TUA
C	14	(Philippines)	Noli Banate	6 ft 5 in (1.96 m)		Mindanao
G	15	(Philippines)	Bernie Fabiosa	5 ft 9 in (1.75 m)		UE
F	16	(Philippines)	Ranulfo Robles	6 ft 3 in (1.91 m)		Letran
F	18	(Philippines)	Philip Cezar	6 ft 2 in (1.88 m)		José Rizal
G	23	(United States)	Ricardo Brown	5 ft 11 in (1.80 m)		Pepperdine
F	24	(Philippines)	Aldo Perez	6 ft 3 in (1.91 m)		De La Salle
F	29	(Philippines)	Bernardo Carpio	6 ft 3 in (1.91 m)		Ateneo
F/C	42	(United States)	Michael Young (I)	6 ft 6 in (1.98 m)		Houston
G	60	(Philippines)	Fortunato Co, Jr	6 ft 0 in (1.83 m)		Mapúa

Head coach

- (Philippines) Baby Dalupan

Assistant coach(es)

- (Philippines) Bong Go

Legend

- (C) Team captain
- (I) Import
- Injured

== Broadcast notes ==
Game	Play-by-play	Analyst
Game 1	Pinggoy Pengson	Andy Jao
Game 2	Joe Cantada	Joaqui Trillo
Game 3		
Game 4		
Game 5		
