= 1985 Manila Beer Brewmasters season =

- Head coach: Loreto Carbonell; Aaron James; Edgardo Ocampo
- Owner: Asia Brewery

Open Conference results
- Record: 8–8 (50%)
- Place: 5th
- Playoff finish: Quarterfinals

All Filipino Conference results
- Record: 4–6 (40%)
- Place: 5th
- Playoff finish: Eliminated

Reinforced Conference results
- Record: 13–9 (59.1%)
- Place: 2nd
- Playoff finish: Finals (lost to NCC)

Manila Beer Brewmasters seasons

The 1985 Manila Beer Brewmasters season was the 2nd season of the franchise in the Philippine Basketball Association (PBA).

== Transactions ==
Players Added	Signed	Former team
Fortunato Co, Jr	Off-season	Crispa (disbanded)
Matthew Gaston	Off-season	Crispa (disbanded)
Elpidio Villamin	Off-season	Crispa (disbanded)
Rodolfo Lalota	Off-season	Tanduay
Eduardo Mendoza	Off-season	Tanduay
Gary Vargas	Off-season	Gilbey's Gin

== Occurrences ==
Manila Beer's first import in the Open Conference, Doug Harris, played seven games and was replaced by the comebacking Lew Brown, who is on his third PBA stint after playing previously with Great Taste in 1980 and Crispa in 1982.

Coach Loreto Carbonell was replaced by former U-Tex import Aaron James to be the team's new head coach starting the All-Filipino Conference. After three straight losses, James was given his walking papers and former Toyota coach Edgardo Ocampo takes over the coaching chores for the Brewmasters, Carbonell remains on the bench as the assistant coach.

On September 25, two-time MVP Ramon Fernandez was sent by Manila Beer to Tanduay Rhum Makers in exchange for one-time MVP Abet Guidaben in a blockbuster trade that took place in two and a half weeks after the start of the PBA Third Conference.

== Notable dates ==
September 26: Abet Guidaben played his first game in Manila Beer uniform as the Brewmasters beat Magnolia, 93-91, for their fifth win in six games.

October 17: Manila Beer turned back Northern Consolidated, 126-121, to make it as the first outright semifinalist in the Third Conference and with the best record after the double round eliminations with nine wins and three losses.

November 17: In a match to decide the first finalist, Manila Beer trailed by nine points against Northern in the fourth period when they banked on an 18-2 salvo and posted a 98-91 lead with 30 seconds left in the ballgame. The Brewmasters enters the finals with a 99-93 win, sending NCC to a playoff match with Great Taste to determine the other finalist.

== Finals stint ==
Heavily fancied at the start of the season, but struck out twice in their cracks for a round of four berth in the Open and All-Filipino Conferences and the crisis which ultimately resulted in the decision to trade Ramon Fernandez, Manila Beer came back in the Third Conference and pulled a hat trick as they will be playing in their second finals appearance.

Manila Beer were swept in four games by the guest national team Northern Consolidated, coach by Ron Jacobs and with two naturalized players; Jeff Moore and Dennis Still. The Brewmasters lost in the four-game series by an average of 25.5 points and were routed in Games One and Four. The finals sweep by NCC was the first time in PBA history that it happen in a best-of-seven series.

== Won-loss records vs Opponents ==
Team	Win	Loss	1st (Open)	2nd (All-Filipino)	3rd (Reinforced)
Ginebra	4	4	1-1	1-1	2-2
Great Taste	4	4	0-2	0-2	4-0
Magnolia	4	3	2-1	1-1	1-1
Northern (NCC)	4	8	2-2	N/A	2-6
Shell	6	1	3-0	1-1	2-0
Tanduay	3	3	0-2	1-1	2-0
Total	25	23	8-8	4-6	13-9

== Roster ==
Manila Beer roster
Players
Coaches

Pos.	No.	Nat.	Name	Ht.	Wt.
G/F	3	(Philippines)	Edgardo Cordero	6 ft 3 in (1.91 m)		UST
G	6	(Philippines)	Fortunato Co, Jr	6 ft 0 in (1.83 m)		Mapúa
F	9	(Philippines)	Rodolfo Lalota	6 ft 2 in (1.88 m)		Mapúa
G/F	11	(Philippines)	Gary Vargas	6 ft 2 in (1.88 m)		PSBA
F	13	(Philippines)	Elpidio Villamin	6 ft 3 in (1.91 m)
F	14	(Philippines)	Leopoldo Herrera	6 ft 3 in (1.91 m)		Wesleyan Philippines
F	16	(Philippines)	Angelito Esguerra	6 ft 2 in (1.88 m)		Letran
G	17	(Philippines)	Eduardo Mendoza	6 ft 0 in (1.83 m)		Visayas
G	18	(Philippines)	Emerito Legaspi	6 ft 0 in (1.83 m)		UE
G	22	(Philippines)	Matthew Gaston	6 ft 1 in (1.85 m)		Ateneo
G	24	(Philippines)	Ramon Cruz	5 ft 11 in (1.80 m)		UE
G/F	32	(Philippines)	Timoteo Coloso	6 ft 2 in (1.88 m)		Letran
C	55	(Philippines)	Abet Guidaben	6 ft 5 in (1.96 m)		USJ–R

Head coach

- (Philippines) Loreto Carbonell
- (United States) Aaron James
- (Philippines) Edgardo Ocampo

Assistant coach(es)

- (Philippines) Loreto Carbonell

Team manager

- (Philippines) Andy Jao

Legend

- (C) Team captain
- Injured

=== Trades ===
September 24, 1985	To Tanduay Rhum Makers Ramon Fernandez	To Manila Beer Abet Guidaben

=== Imports ===
Name	Conference	No.	Pos.	Ht.	College
Doug Harris	Open Conference	50	Forward-Center	6"6'	CWU
Lewis Brown	Open Conference	33	Center-Forward	6"11'	UNLV
Francois Wise	Reinforced Conference	5	Forward	6"5'	CSULB
