= 1985 PBA All-Filipino Conference finals =

Basketball cup finals

Team	Coach	Wins
Great Taste Coffee Makers	Baby Dalupan	3
Shell Azodrin Bugbusters	Freddie Webb	1
- Dates: August 13–20, 1985
- Television: Vintage Sports (MBS)
- Radio network: DZRP/DZFM

PBA All-Filipino Conference finals chronology
- < 1984 Second 1986 >

The 1985 PBA All-Filipino Conference finals was the best-of-5 basketball championship series of the 1985 PBA All-Filipino Conference, and the conclusion of the conference playoffs. The Great Taste Coffee Makers and Shell Azodrin Bugbusters played for the 31st championship contested by the league.

The Great Taste Coffee Makers won their finals series against Shell Azodrin Bugbusters, three games to one, for their fourth straight PBA title.

== Qualification ==
Great Taste		Shell
Finished 8–2 (.800), 1st	Eliminations	Finished 5–5 (.500), tied for 2nd
Finished 12–4 (.750), 1st	Semifinals	Finished 8–8 (.500), tied for 2nd
Finished 12–4 (.750), 1st	Tiebreaker	Won against Ginebra, 89–76

== Series scoring summary ==
Team	Game 1	Game 2	Game 3	Game 4	Wins
Great Taste	103	113	102	110	3
Shell Azodrin	98	106	103	91	1
Venue	ULTRA	ULTRA	ULTRA	ULTRA

== Games summary ==
=== Game 1 ===
Vintage

August 13

recap

Great Taste Coffee Makers 103, Shell Azodrin 98
Scoring by quarter: 26–16, 27–29, 20–22, 30–31
Pts: Pongkee Alolor 23	Pts: Bogs Adornado 28

The ULTRA, Pasig

Ricardo Brown was taken out at 7:36 in the second period after he sustained a bad fall while going for a layup. The Coffee Makers dominated the first half despite the loss of Brown and took the fight out of the rallying Bugbusters midway in the final period with a 9–2 spurt to open a 91–80 lead, time down to five minutes.

=== Game 2 ===
Vintage

August 15

Great Taste Coffee Makers 113, Shell Azodrin 106
Scoring by quarter: 29–28, 29–26, 25–26, 30–26
Pts: Manny Victorino 35	Pts: Bogs Adornado 46

The ULTRA, Pasig

Manny Victorino shot a team-high 35 points but it was the presence of Ricardo Brown that led to the Coffee Makers' surge in the final period, Brown sparked an 11–2 blast to turn an 87–90 deficit to a 98–92 lead with 5:23 left. The bugbusters lapsed into series of errors as Great Taste went to pad its lead to 12 points at 111–99 with 42 seconds remaining. Bogs Adornado shot a conference-high 46 points for Shell but the Coffee Makers' defense held other bugbusters in check.

=== Game 3 ===
Vintage

August 18

recap

Great Taste Coffee Makers 102, Shell Azodrin 103
Scoring by quarter: 20–32, 24–22, 26–17, 32–32
Pts: Willie Pearson 22	Pts: Bogs Adornado 32

The ULTRA, Pasig

Ricardo Brown missed what could have been a winning shot at the buzzer. In the last five seconds, Brown moved out of a double team by Bernie Fabiosa and Romy Ang and jumped at the left side of the key hole but the ball rimmed out as the buzzer sounded. The bugbusters almost let a won game slipped away, the Coffee Makers were behind by 10 points at halftime but came back with Brown hitting four three-point shots in the last nine minutes. Great Taste moved to within 102–103 on the last of Brown's triple and Willie Pearson intercepted a pass by Philip Cezar with 27 seconds to go.

=== Game 4 ===
Vintage

August 20

Great Taste Coffee Makers 110, Shell Azodrin 91
Scoring by quarter: 19–24, 35–14, 29–19, 27–34
Pts: Ricardo Brown 23	Pts: Bogs Adornado 32
Great Taste wins series, 3–1

The ULTRA, Pasig

An explosive second quarter blitz by Great Taste opened up a 54–38 halftime advantage. Ricardo Brown, who shot 15 points in the second quarter alone, including three triples, spearheaded a decisive 23–5 splurge as the Coffee Makers took a 16-point lead at the break. The bugbusters never recovered from there as the lead of Great Taste balloon to as many as 30 points in the second half, the last at 110–80 and with the championship wrapped up, the Coffee Makers relaxed allowing the Bugbusters to score eleven straight points for the final count.

1985 PBA All-Filipino Conference Champions

Great Taste Coffee Makers
Fourth title

== Rosters ==
Great Taste Coffee roster
Players
Coaches

Pos.	No.	Nat.	Name	Ht.	Wt.
C	1	(Philippines)	Manny Victorino	6 ft 5 in (1.96 m)		José Rizal
G/F	2	(Philippines)	Alejo Alolor	6 ft 1 in (1.85 m)		Visayas
G/F	3	(Philippines)	Oliveros Dalman	6 ft 2 in (1.88 m)		Visayas
G	4	(Philippines)	Frankie Lim (injured)	5 ft 11 in (1.80 m)		San Beda
F	6	(Philippines)	Abe King	6 ft 3 in (1.91 m)		San Beda
C	7	(Philippines)	Joel Banal	6 ft 5 in (1.96 m)		Mapúa
G	11	(Philippines)	Jaime Manansala	5 ft 11 in (1.80 m)		UE
F	14	(Philippines)	Chito Loyzaga	6 ft 3 in (1.91 m)		San Beda
G	18	(Philippines)	Lawrence Merced	6 ft 0 in (1.83 m)		Adamson
C	20	(Philippines)	Teodicio Alfarero	6 ft 4 in (1.93 m)		De La Salle
G	23	(United States)	Ricardo Brown	5 ft 11 in (1.80 m)		Pepperdine
F	29	(Philippines)	Bernardo Carpio	6 ft 3 in (1.91 m)		Ateneo
F	33	(United States)	William Pearson	6 ft 1 in (1.85 m)		Chaminade

Head coach

- (Philippines) Baby Dalupan

Assistant coach(es)

- (Philippines) Jimmy Mariano

Legend

- (C) Team captain
- Injured

Shell Azodrin roster
Players
Coaches

Pos.	No.	Nat.	Name	Ht.	Wt.
F	3	(Philippines)	Alberto Gutierrez	6 ft 2 in (1.88 m)		Ateneo de Davao
C	5	(Philippines)	Sonny Cabatu	6 ft 5 in (1.96 m)		PSBA
G	7	(Philippines)	Arturo Cristobal	6 ft 1 in (1.85 m)		Far Eastern
G	10	(Philippines)	Romeo Ang	6 ft 1 in (1.85 m)		Letran
C	11	(Philippines)	Menardo Jubinal	6 ft 4 in (1.93 m)		Mapúa
F	12	(Philippines)	Rey Lazaro	6 ft 2 in (1.88 m)		Far Eastern
G	13	(Philippines)	Leo Austria	5 ft 10 in (1.78 m)		Lyceum
F	17	(Philippines)	Manuel Marquez	6 ft 2 in (1.88 m)		San Beda
F	26	(Philippines)	Aldo Perez	6 ft 3 in (1.91 m)		De La Salle
G/F	33	(Philippines)	Bogs Adornado	6 ft 1 in (1.85 m)		UST
F	42	(Philippines)	Dennis Abbatuan	6 ft 2 in (1.88 m)		José Rizal
G	51	(Philippines)	Bernie Fabiosa	5 ft 9 in (1.75 m)		UE
F	81	(Philippines)	Philip Cezar	6 ft 3 in (1.91 m)		José Rizal

Head coach

- (Philippines) Freddie Webb

Assistant coach(es)

- (Philippines) Frederick Gonzales

Legend

- (C) Team captain
- Injured

== Broadcast notes ==
Game	Play-by-play	Analyst
Game 1		
Game 2		
Game 3		
Game 4		
