= PBA Reinforced Conference =

Philippines basketball tournament

- Founded: 1985; 41 years ago
- First season: 1985
- Folded: 2003; 23 years ago
- Last champion: Coca-Cola Tigers (1st title) (2003)

The PBA Reinforced Conference was a tournament held during a Philippine Basketball Association season from 1985–1989, and again in 2003. The tournament usually allows team to hire one or two imports, although the 2003 edition rules that teams sign foreign players with a height-limit of 6'4" below.

== History ==
The first edition of the tournament began in the 1985 PBA season with guest team, the famed Northern Consolidated RP national squad winning over Manila Beer, via a four-game sweep.

A year later, Tanduay defeated Great Taste to win the title. But, from 1987-1989, San Miguel Beer dominated the tournament. In 1987, they defeated the Hills Bros Coffee Kings in five games. A season later, the Beermen beat Shell, 4–1, and in 1989, they beat arch-rival Anejo Rhum, to complete the 1989 grand slam.

The tournament took a hiatus for the next 14-years, before new commissioner Noli Eala, revived the conference in 2003. The tournament allowed teams to take an import, with a maximum height limit of 6-4 below. The Coca-Cola Tigers, defeated sister team, and defending champion San Miguel Beermen (technically defending the titles won from 1987 to 1989) in seven games.

In 2004, the league scrapped the said name, replacing it with the PBA Fiesta Conference.

== Reinforced Conference Champions ==
- 1985: Northern Consolidated Cement def. Manila Beer, 4–0
- 1986: Tanduay Rhum def. Great Taste, 4–2
- 1987: San Miguel Beer def. Hills Bros Coffee Kings, 4–1
- 1988: San Miguel Beer def. Shell, 4–1
- 1989: San Miguel Beer def. Añejo Rhum 65, 4–1
- 1990–2002 PBA season: Not played
- 2003: Coca-Cola Tigers def. San Miguel Beermen, 4–3

== Reinforced Conference individual awards ==
- 1985
  - Best Import Award: Michael Hackett (Ginebra San Miguel)
- 1986
  - Best Import Award: Rob Williams (Tanduay)
- 1987
  - Best Import Award: David Thirdkill (Tanduay)
- 1988
  - Best Import Award: Jamie Walker (Ginebra San Miguel)
- 1989
  - Best Import Award: Bobby Parks (Shell)
- 2003
  - Best Player of the Conference: Rudy Hatfield (Coca-Cola)
  - Best Import Award: Artemus McClary (Coca-Cola)

== See also ==
- Philippine Basketball Association Champions
