= 1985 Great Taste Coffee Makers season =

- Head coach: Baby Dalupan
- Owner: CFC Corporation

Open Conference results
- Record: 17–7 (70.8%)
- Place: 1st
- Playoff finish: Champion

All Filipino Conference results
- Record: 15–5 (75%)
- Place: 1st
- Playoff finish: Champion

Reinforced Conference results
- Record: 12–15 (44.4%)
- Place: 4th
- Playoff finish: Semifinals

Great Taste Coffee Makers seasons

The 1985 Great Taste Coffee Makers season was the 11th season of the franchise in the Philippine Basketball Association (PBA).

== Transactions ==
Players Added	Signed	Former team
Abe King	Off-season	Gold Eagle
Willie Pearson	Off-season	Crispa (disbanded)
Teddy Alfarero ^{Rookie, originally drafted by Gold Eagle}	Off-season	N/A
Lawrence Merced ^{Rookie}	Off-season	N/A
Oliver Dalman	June 1985	Country Fair Hotdogs

== Championships ==
The Great Taste Coffee Makers have emerged as the new dynasty in winning their third straight PBA crown with a 4-2 series win over Magnolia Ice Cream. The title playoffs where Great Taste were prohibitive picks to win easily have turned out to be the toughest. The series are tied at two games apiece before Great Taste scored runaway victories in Games five and six.

The defending All-Filipino champions went on to play surprise finalist and first-year ballclub Shell Azodrin in the All-Filipino finals. The Coffee Makers easily won the first two games but the Bugbusters extended the series by winning the third game by one point. Great Taste won their fourth straight title on August 20, routing Shell Azodrin, 110-91, in Game four for a 3-1 series victory.

== Occurrences ==
On March 19, Great Taste point guard Ricardo Brown played in his first game in the 1985 season upon returning from an extended furlough in the US. The Coffee Makers will also have a new import Joe Binion (3rd round pick by San Antonio Spurs in the 1984 NBA draft), who will make his debut against Magnolia when Great Taste management decided to send home Napoleon Johnson after four games.

In the Third Conference, Great Taste played their last two games in the first round of eliminations without an import when their original choice Wally Rank refused to play after four appearances unless he was paid in advance. Rank was replaced by Michael Britt, who also saw action for four games before Great Taste had to settled for a former Seattle Supersonic Cory Blackwell.

== Notable dates ==
March 3: With 15,000 fans who filled the new venue ULTRA to the rafters on opening day twinbill, Great Taste hammered out a 102-99 victory over Ginebra San Miguel in the nightcap. Import Napoleon Johnson scored 39 points while transferees Abe King and Willie Pearson proved their worth with 17 and 16 points respectively. The Coffee Makers played without Ricardo Brown, Frankie Lim and Jaime Manansala.

November 3: Great Taste keeps its grandslam hopes alive with a 99-95 win over Magnolia in the sudden-death playoff for the last berth in the semifinal round, despite being handicapped with import Cory Blackwell still not in tip-top condition and only saw action briefly in the first half. Abe King topscored for Great Taste with 28 points.

November 17: In the last game of the semifinal playdate, both Great Taste and Ginebra toted a 2-3 won-loss card and needed a win to stay on track for a finals berth. Great Taste prevailed over Ginebra in the knockout match, 138-130. Ricardo Brown knocked in 39 points, Cory Blackwell had 33 points and Jaime Manansala added 29 markers.

== Awards ==
- In his third year in the league, Ricardo Brown won the league's Most Valuable Player (MVP) award.
- Center Manny Victorino and forward Willie Pearson along with MVP winner Ricardo Brown made it to the Mythical Five selection.

== Won-loss records vs Opponents ==
Team	Win	Loss	1st (Open)	2nd (All-Filipino)	3rd (Reinforced)
Ginebra	8	6	2-0	3-1	3-5
Magnolia	13	3	7-3	2-0	4-0
Manila Beer	4	4	2-0	2-0	0-4
Northern (NCC)	3	7	2-2	N/A	1-5
Shell	8	4	1-1	5-3	2-0
Tanduay	8	3	3-1	3-1	2-1
Total	44	27	17-7	15-5	12-15

== Roster ==
Great Taste Coffee roster
Players
Coaches

Pos.	No.	Nat.	Name	Ht.	Wt.
C	1	(Philippines)	Manny Victorino	6 ft 5 in (1.96 m)		José Rizal
G/F	2	(Philippines)	Alejo Alolor	6 ft 1 in (1.85 m)		Visayas
G/F	3	(Philippines)	Oliveros Dalman	6 ft 2 in (1.88 m)		Visayas
G	4	(Philippines)	Frankie Lim (injured)	5 ft 11 in (1.80 m)		San Beda
F	6	(Philippines)	Abe King	6 ft 3 in (1.91 m)		San Beda
C	7	(Philippines)	Joel Banal	6 ft 5 in (1.96 m)		Mapúa
G	11	(Philippines)	Jaime Manansala	5 ft 11 in (1.80 m)		UE
F	14	(Philippines)	Chito Loyzaga	6 ft 3 in (1.91 m)		San Beda
G	18	(Philippines)	Lawrence Merced	6 ft 0 in (1.83 m)		Adamson
C	20	(Philippines)	Teodicio Alfarero	6 ft 4 in (1.93 m)		De La Salle
G	23	(United States)	Ricardo Brown	5 ft 11 in (1.80 m)		Pepperdine
F	29	(Philippines)	Bernardo Carpio	6 ft 3 in (1.91 m)		Ateneo
F	33	(United States)	William Pearson	6 ft 1 in (1.85 m)		Chaminade

Head coach

- (Philippines) Baby Dalupan

Assistant coach(es)

- (Philippines) Jimmy Mariano

Team manager

- (Philippines) Ignacio Gotao

Legend

- (C) Team captain
- Injured

=== Imports ===
Name	Conference	No.	Pos.	Ht.	College
Napoleon Johnson	Open Conference	00	Center	6"9'	GSU
Joe Binion	Open Conference	30	Center-Forward	6"8'	North Carolina A&T
Wally Rank	Reinforced Conference	21	Forward	6"5'	SJSU
Michael Britt	Reinforced Conference	21	Forward	6"5'	UDC
Cory Blackwell	Reinforced Conference	30	Forward	6"5'	UW-Madison
