= 1985 Ginebra San Miguel season =

- Head coach: Robert Jaworski
- Owner: La Tondeña Incorporada

Open Conference results
- Record: 3–9 (25%)
- Place: 7th
- Playoff finish: Eliminated

All Filipino Conference results
- Record: 10–11 (47.6%)
- Place: 4th
- Playoff finish: Semifinals

Reinforced Conference results
- Record: 15–9 (62.5%)
- Place: 3rd
- Playoff finish: Semifinals

Ginebra San Miguel seasons

The 1985 Ginebra San Miguel season was the 7th season of the franchise in the Philippine Basketball Association (PBA).

== Transactions ==
Players Added	Signed	Former team
Arnie Tuadles	Off-season	Great Taste
Ricky Relosa	Off-season	Beer Hausen
Nicanor Bulaong	Off-season	Beer Hausen
Rey Perez ^{Rookie}	Off-season	N/A

== New team name ==
The new name of the Gilbey's Gin was announced by team manager Adolf Ferrer during the formal turnover ceremonies witnessed by Ginebra playing coach Sonny Jaworski and PBA president Carlos "Honeyboy" Palanca.

After two months of negotiations between W & A Gilbey's Ltd. of London and LA Tondeña Inc., Gilbey's International Managing Director John Townsend "finally agreed to sell the team name rights to Ginebra San Miguel."

== Occurrences ==
Team owner Carlos Palanca offered a role of playing-coach to Robert Jaworski and handle the team beginning the season, replacing their former coach Arturo Valenzona. The Big J brought along his former Toyota teammate Rino Salazar to be his assistant coach and the Ginebra ballclub was a Toyota reincarnation with five former Toyota players with the acquisition of Arnie Tuadles from Great Taste and Ricky Relosa of Beer Hausen.

On the third playing date of the Open Conference on March 7, Ginebra beat Tanduay, 89–86, only to lose that victory when the PBA commissioner uphold the Tanduay protest, citing a fatal error by the referees in the dying seconds of the game. The replay was set on April 14 in a triple-header with the Ginebra-Tanduay game scheduled at 3pm. Unlike when the two teams first met, Ginebra import Harold Driver and Tanduay import Merlin Wilson will no longer be around in the replayed game as they were both already been replaced, Driver was sent home after four games and Ginebra brought in John Campbell.

On October 22, Ginebra beat Northern (NCC), 99–96, in a match wherein Ginebra playing-coach Robert Jaworski was hit by an elbow from naturalized player Jeff Moore late in the second quarter which caused him to bleed from the mouth that requires 9 stitches, the Big J had to come back from the hospital and fielded himself in during the third quarter to lead the Ginebras back in the game along with his backcourt partner Francis Arnaiz. This was said to be the memorable night that give birth to the "never-say-die" spirit.

== Notable dates ==
April 11: Ginebra scored their first win of the season after seven losses and the Big J finally had his first victory as playing coach in their 118–104 triumph over Manila Beer.

August 8: Ginebra forces a knockout game with Shell for the second finals berth and the right to meet defending champion Great Taste for the All-Filipino championship following a 101–93 victory over the Bugbusters.

September 10: Ginebra import Michael Hackett, a third round pick by the Los Angeles Lakers in the 1982 draft, debut with 48 points and 27 rebounds in the Gins' 107–106 squeaker over Northern Consolidated (NCC).

September 28: Michael Hackett scored 70 points and pulled down 27 rebounds in Ginebra's 137–122 win over Shell in Cabanatuan City.

October 3: Michael Hackett scored 76 points as Ginebra defeated Manila Beer, 143–127, giving the Beermen their second loss in eight games while Ginebra raised their record to four wins and three losses.

October 22: In the first of two playoff games to determined the second outright semifinalist, the Ginebras, starring the ageless Sonny Jaworski, completed a pass from Michael Hackett with a go-ahead basket plus a foul from Dennis Still as Ginebra escaped with a 99–96 win over Northern.

October 24: Ginebra advances to the semifinal round with a 106–98 victory over Magnolia Quench Plus.

November 5: Ginebra opened their semifinal assignment with a repeat win over Northern, 101–97, reminiscent of their playoff match two weeks before with the Ginebras coming up with big plays in the final period to turn back NCC.

== Records ==
November 21: Game One of the showdown for third place in the Reinforced Conference saw Ginebra down Great Taste in lopsided fashion, 197–168, Michael Hackett, who was voted Best Import of the Reinforced Conference, scored 103 points in the highest-scoring game in PBA History. Hackett's 103-point output broke the previous record of 88 points set by Larry McNeill in 1983. Ginebra's 197 was the highest score and the 112 points (57 in the 3rd and 55 in the 4th) scored by Ginebra in the second half broke the previous record. Great Taste' 62 points in the fourth quarter was an all-time high.

Ginebra took a commanding 85–64 edge at the end of the first half and Hackett contributed 48 points of the team's total output after 24 minutes of play. Hackett hit the century mark with still 4:36 to go in the game, he was finally relieve as the clock reads 1:07.

== Won-loss records vs Opponents ==
Team	Win	Loss	1st (Open)	2nd (All-Filipino)	3rd (Reinforced)
Great Taste	6	8	0-2	1-3	5-3
Magnolia	3	4	0-2	1-1	2-1
Manila Beer	4	4	1-1	1-1	2-2
Northern (NCC)	4	3	1-1	N/A	3-2
Shell	5	4	0-2	3-2	2-0
Tanduay	6	6	1-1	4-4	1-1
Total	28	29	3-9	10-11	15-9

== Roster ==
1985 Ginebra San Miguel roster
Players

Pos.	#	POB	Name	Height	Weight	DOB (YYYY–MM–DD)	From
F	5	(Philippines)	Stephen Watson	6 ft 2 in (1.88 m)			Ateneo
G	7	(Philippines)	Robert Jaworski	6 ft 1 in (1.85 m)			UE
G	8	(Philippines)	Francis Arnaiz	5 ft 11 in (1.80 m)			Ateneo
C	10	(Philippines)	Eduardo Ducut	6 ft 5 in (1.96 m)			Letran
F	11	(Philippines)	Arnie Tuadles	6 ft 1 in (1.85 m)			Visayas
G	12	(Philippines)	Alex Clariño	6 ft 1 in (1.85 m)			Lyceum
F	13	(Philippines)	Antero Saldaña	6 ft 3 in (1.91 m)			Letran
C	14	(Philippines)	Romulo Mamaril	6 ft 6 in (1.98 m)			Mapúa
F	15	(Philippines)	Ricky Relosa	6 ft 3 in (1.91 m)			Mapúa
F	17	(Philippines)	Joseph Herrera	6 ft 2 in (1.88 m)			Letran
F	19	(Philippines)	Nicanor Bulaong	6 ft 3 in (1.91 m)			Far Eastern
F	20	(Philippines)	Rolando Buhay	6 ft 3 in (1.91 m)			NCBA
G/F	33	(Philippines)	Joey Marquez	6 ft 1 in (1.85 m)			Angeles
G	77	(Philippines)	Reynaldo Perez	6 ft 1 in (1.85 m)			Mapúa

Coaches

Head coach

- (Philippines) Robert Jaworski

Assistant coach(es)

- (Philippines) Rino Salazar

Team manager

- (Philippines) Adolf Ferrer

Legend

- (C) Team captain
- Injured

=== Imports ===
Name	Conference	No.	Pos.	Ht.	College
Harold Driver	Open Conference	9	Forward-Center	6"6'	Quinnipiac University
John Campbell	Open Conference	23	Center-Forward	6"9'	Clemson University
Michael Hackett	Reinforced Conference	00	Forward-Center	6"5'	Jacksonville University
