= List of Philippine Basketball Association awards =

The Philippine Basketball Association (PBA) presents twelve annual awards to recognize its teams, players, and coaches for their accomplishments. An additional seven awards officially recognized by the PBA were also given annually by the PBA Press Corps during a season break. This does not include the championship trophies for the Philippine, Commissioner's and Governors' Cups which are given to the winning team of its respective finals.

The league awarded trophies with varying designs for their tournament/conference champions from 1975 to 1993 until the trophy designs were standardized in 1994 for the All-Filipino, Commissioner's and Governors' Cups.

The Commissioner's and Governors' Cups were deactivated in 2003, when the name of the second and third conferences were changed to Invitational and Reinforced Conferences. Further changes in the tournament calendar were made in 2004 when the league decided to hold only two tournaments per season; the All-Filipino Cup, renamed as the Philippine Cup and the import-laced Fiesta Conference.

The Philippine Cup trophy design also varied from 2003 to 2006. In 2007, a new trophy, named the "Perpetual Trophy", later named as the Jun Bernardino Trophy was made for the winners of the said tournament. In 2010, the league re-adopted the three-conference season format and reactivated the Commissioner's and Governors' Cups as the second and third conference of the PBA season.

Aside from these annual awards, the league also has weekly honors during the conference for its players.

Each individual award, with the exception of the Best Player of the Conference, Best Import and Finals MVP (which are given near the conclusion of the conference), is awarded during the PBA Leo Awards, which is held before the start of the fourth game (or third game if it is a best-of-five) of the third conference's finals series.

== Team trophies ==
Note: The league awarded different trophy designs for the All-Filipino Conference/Philippine Cup from 1975 to 1994 and from 2003 to 2007. The other import-laced, non-consecutive and special conferences from 1975 to 2010 such as the Open, Reinforced, Invitational, and Fiesta Conferences have different trophy designs per tournament. The Commissioner's and Governors' Cups were first awarded in 1993, albeit a different trophy design.

Image	Award	Created	Description	Most recent winner	Notes
the second incarnation of the Jun Bernardino Trophy	Jun Bernardino Trophy	2007	The PBA's championship trophy awarded to the winning team of the Philippine Cup Finals.	San Miguel Beermen	
	All-Filipino Cup	1994	The PBA's championship trophy awarded to the winning team of the All-Filipino Cup Finals. It was replaced by the Jun Bernardino Trophy.	N/A; trophy retired after 2002	
The PBA Commissioner's Cup trophy won by the Alaska Aces in 2013.	PBA Commissioner's Cup	1994	The PBA's championship trophy awarded to the winning team of the Commissioner's Cup Finals.	TNT Tropang Giga	
The PBA Governors' Cup trophy won by the Barangay Ginebra San Miguel in 2016.	PBA Governors' Cup	1994	The PBA's championship trophy awarded to the winning team of the Governors' Cup Finals.	TNT Tropang Giga	

== Honors ==
Honor	Created	Description	Notes
Mythical Team	1975	Two 5-player teams (a first and second team) composed of the best players in the league following every PBA season. From 1975 to 1983 only five players were selected.	
All-Rookie Team	2004–05	A 5-player team composed of the top rookies during the season. This award is given by the PBA Press Corps	
All-Defensive Team	1985	A 5-player team composed of the best defensive players during the season.	

== Individual season awards ==
Award	Created	Description	Most recent winner(s)	Notes
All-Star Game MVP	1989	Awarded to the best performing player of the annual PBA All-Star Game as voted by a panel of media members.	Japeth Aguilar (Barangay Ginebra San Miguel); Robert Bolick (NLEX Road Warriors) (co-winners)	
Rookie of the Year	1976	Awarded to the top rookie of the season.	RJ Abarrientos (Barangay Ginebra San Miguel)	
Most Valuable Player	1975	Awarded to the best performing player of the season as voted by a panel of sportswriters and media members.	June Mar Fajardo (San Miguel Beermen)	
Most Improved Player	1983	Awarded to the most improved player in the league.	Joshua Munzon (NorthPort Batang Pier)	
Samboy Lim Sportsmanship award	1993	Named in 2016 after its first awardee, Samboy Lim. Awarded to the player who displays "the ideals of sportsmanship on the court with ethical behavior, fair play and integrity".	Gian Mamuyac (Rain or Shine Elasto Painters)	
Coach of the Year (Baby Dalupan Trophy)	1993	Named after Baby Dalupan; awarded to the best coach of the season as voted by a panel of sportswriters and media members. This award is given annually by the PBA Press Corps.	Chot Reyes (TNT Tropang 5G)	
Executive of the Year (Danny Floro Trophy)	2008–09	Named after Danny Floro; awarded to the PBA top front office executive as voted by a panel of sportswriters and media. This award is given annually by the PBA Press Corps.	Manny Pangilinan (TNT Tropang 5G)	
Defensive Player of the Year	1993	Awarded to the top defensive player of the season as voted by a panel of sportswriters and media. This award is given annually by the PBA Press Corps.	Zavier Lucero (Magnolia Chicken Timplados Hotshots)	
Order of Merit	2008–09	Awarded to the player who had the most "Best Player of the Week" awards in a season. This award is given annually by the PBA Press Corps.	Calvin Oftana (TNT Tropang 5G)	
Scoring Champion	2011–12	Awarded to the player who has the highest points per game (ppg) average in a season. This award is given annually by the PBA Press Corps.	Arvin Tolentino (NorthPort Batang Pier)	
Comeback Player of the Year (Bogs Adornado Trophy)	1993	Named after Bogs Adornado; awarded to the player who made an astounding comeback and created a huge impact with his performance in a season. This award is given annually by the PBA Press Corps.	Brandon Ganuelas-Rosser (TNT Tropang 5G)	
Mr. Quality Minutes	1993	Awarded to the best performing player as a substitute (or sixth man) during the season. This award is given annually by the PBA Press Corps.	Don Trollano (San Miguel Beermen)	

== Individual conference awards ==
Award	Created	Description	Most recent winner(s)	Notes
Ramon Fernandez Finals Most Valuable Player	1996	Awarded to the best performing player of the conference's Finals as voted by a panel of sportswriters and media.	Jericho Cruz (San Miguel Beermen); 2025 PBA Philippine Cup	
Best Player of the Conference	1994	Awarded to the best performing player of the conference.	June Mar Fajardo (San Miguel Beermen); 2025 PBA Philippine Cup	
Bobby Parks Best Import the Conference	1981	Named after Bobby Parks; awarded to the best performing non-local player (import) of the conference.	Rondae Hollis-Jefferson (TNT Tropang Giga); 2024–25 Commissioner's Cup	

== See also ==
- 50 Greatest Players in PBA History
- PBA Hall of Fame
