= 1985 Tanduay Rhum Makers season =

- Head coach: Orly Castelo; Arturo Valenzona
- Owners: Elizalde & Co.

Open Conference results
- Record: 10–14 (41.7%)
- Place: 4th
- Playoff finish: Semifinals

All Filipino Conference results
- Record: 9–11 (45%)
- Place: 3rd
- Playoff finish: Semifinals

Reinforced Conference results
- Record: 5–10 (33.3%)
- Place: 6th
- Playoff finish: Quarterfinals

Tanduay Rhum Makers seasons

The 1985 Tanduay Rhum Makers season was the 11th season of the franchise in the Philippine Basketball Association (PBA).

== Transactions ==
Players Added	Signed	Former team
Abet Guidaben	Off-season	Crispa (disbanded)
Freddie Hubalde	Off-season	Crispa (disbanded)
Padim Israel	Off-season	Crispa (disbanded)
Onchie Dela Cruz	Off-season	N/A
Willie Generalao	Off-season	Gilbey's Gin
Victor Sanchez	Off-season	Beer Hausen

== Occurrences ==
Merlin Wilson, who was Tanduay's import back in 1979, returns after six years and played for the Rhum Makers in their first two games (only one game officially when their second outing vs Ginebra was ordered replayed) in the Open Conference. He was replaced by David Pope.

After the first round of eliminations in the Third Conference with Tanduay having only one win in six games, a blockbuster trade took place sending their center Abet Guidaben to Manila Beer in favor of Ramon Fernandez. On October 1, Fernandez debut in Tanduay uniform in the Rhum Makers' 106–112 loss to Magnolia.

Coach Orly Castelo was assigned by the ballclub to be the team's athletic director going into their last five games in the elimination round of the Third Conference, he was replaced by former Gilbey's coach Arturo Valenzona.

== Won-loss records vs Opponents ==
Team	Win	Loss	1st (Open)	2nd (All-Filipino)	3rd (Reinforced)
Ginebra	6	6	1-1	4-4	1-1
Great Taste	3	8	1-3	1-3	1-2
Magnolia	3	6	1-3	1-1	1-2
Manila Beer	3	3	2-0	1-1	0-2
Northern (NCC)	3	10	3-7	N/A	0-3
Shell	6	2	2-0	2-2	2-0
Total	24	35	10-14	9-11	5-10

== Roster ==
Tanduay Rhum Makers roster
Players
Coaches

Pos.	No.	Nat.	Name	Ht.	Wt.
G		(Philippines)	Roberto De la Rosa	5 ft 11 in (1.80 m)		Far Eastern
G	7	(Philippines)	Antonio Torrente	6 ft 1 in (1.85 m)
G	9	(Philippines)	Onchie Dela Cruz	5 ft 11 in (1.80 m)		Philippine Christian
G	10	(Philippines)	Freddie Hubalde	6 ft 1 in (1.85 m)		Mapúa
F	12	(Philippines)	Victor Sanchez	6 ft 3 in (1.91 m)		Mapúa
F	13	(Philippines)	Alberto Gutierrez	6 ft 2 in (1.88 m)		Ateneo de Davao
F/C	15	(Philippines)	Ely Capacio	6 ft 4 in (1.93 m)
F	17	(Philippines)	Padim Israel	6 ft 2 in (1.88 m)		Ateneo
C	19	(Philippines)	Ramon Fernandez	6 ft 4 in (1.93 m)		San Carlos
F	24	(Philippines)	Jose Yango	6 ft 3 in (1.91 m)		San Beda
G	32	(Philippines)	Tito Varela	6 ft 1 in (1.85 m)		UE
G	34	(Philippines)	Allan Abelgas	5 ft 10 in (1.78 m)		USJ–R
G	40	(Philippines)	Alex Tan	6 ft 0 in (1.83 m)		UE
G	42	(Philippines)	Willie Generalao	5 ft 9 in (1.75 m)		Visayas

Head coach

- (Philippines) Orly Castelo
- (Philippines) Arturo Valenzona

Assistant coach(es)

- (Philippines) Ely Tolentino

Team manager

- (Philippines) Eddie Rivera

Legend

- (C) Team captain
- Injured

=== Trades ===
September 24, 1985	To Manila Beer Abet Guidaben	To Tanduay Rhum Makers Ramon Fernandez

=== Imports ===
Name	Conference	No.	Pos.	Ht.	From
Merlin Wilson	Open Conference	44	Center-forward	6'7"/2.01 m	Georgetown
David Pope	Open Conference	66	Center-forward	6'7"/2.01 m	NSU
Ronnie Valentine	Reinforced Conference	44	Forward-center	6'6"/1.98 m	ODU
