= Northern Cement basketball team =

- Leagues: Philippine Basketball Association (1984–1985)
- Founded: 1980
- Dissolved: 1986
- Location: Philippines
- Team colors: Red, white and black
- President: Eduardo M. Cojuangco, Jr.
- Head coach: Ron Jacobs
- Championships: Northern Cement: 1981 William Jones Cup; 1985 William Jones Cup (playing as San Miguel Beer); 1985 PBA Reinforced Conference; As the Philippine national team: 1981 Southeast Asian Games; 1982 ABC Juniors Championship; 1985 Southeast Asian Games; 1985 ABC Championship
- Website: http://www.ncc.com.ph
Home	Away

The Northern Cement basketball team (popularly known as "the NCC basketball team") refers to the team that represented the national basketball program and training pool for the Philippines men's national basketball team from 1980 to 1986. The team was owned by businessman Eduardo "Danding" Cojuangco, Jr. through his company, Northern Cement Corporation (NCC).

== Beginnings ==
In 1980, businessman and ambassador Eduardo "Danding" Cojuangco, founder and owner of Northern Cement Corporation, was appointed by the Philippine President Ferdinand E. Marcos to become the project director for basketball in the country. Cojuangco (despite not being an officer or member of the national basketball governing body at that time - the Basketball Association of the Philippines) was tasked to set up, finance, and develop the national basketball team to represent the country internationally. During that time, the best players in the country were playing in the Philippine Basketball Association (PBA), the first professional basketball league in the Philippines, and in Asia. With the Fédération Internationale de Basketball Amateur ruling that only amateur basketball players would be allowed to participate in national basketball team tournaments, Cojuangco sought a way to keep the Philippine basketball competitive on the international stage, without the country's best players.

American collegiate coaches Ron Jacobs and Ben Lindsey were brought in to handle the team. Eventually, Jacobs became NCC's head coach.

=== The first NCC team (1981-1982) ===
Seeking to fast-track the success of the program, the first team formed in 1981 (known as the RP Training Team) was mainly made up of eight American players who became naturalized Filipinos (a practice also common to European national teams at that time) which included Dennis Still and Jeff Moore. Two Filipino-Americans, Willie Pearson, and National Basketball Association Filipino-American draftee Ricardo Brown were included, along with two local players in JB Yango and Frankie Lim, both from San Beda College. This was done with the intention of passing on new basketball technology to the Filipino cagers.

The team (playing as Northern Cement) easily won the 4th William Jones Cup in 1981, but failed to gain support among Filipino fans, as they viewed the program as merely having foreigners represent the country. This team was eventually scrapped, and Jacobs was then asked to develop local talents instead.

In 1981, at the Southeast Asian Games held in Manila, Jacobs was tasked to retain the country's gold medal in men's basketball. Noting the lack of competition, Jacobs decided to appoint former UE Red Warriors head coach Pilo Pumaren as coach for the Philippine team, made up of players from the Manila Industrial and Commercial Athletic Association. The team successfully retained the gold medal.

In 1982, Jacobs mentored the Philippines' under-19 basketball team to the Asian Basketball Confederation Juniors Championship in his first official tournament as head coach for the Philippines' teams. The team included players such as Alfie Almario, Elmer Reyes, Tonichi Ytturi, Franz Pumaren, Teddy Alfarero, Rey Cuenco, Leo Austria, Jong Uichico, Hector Calma, and Louie Brill. The team beat China in the final at the Araneta Coliseum in Manila. However, even as Jacobs went about developing local talents, the players were still deemed "raw".

=== The second NCC team (1983 ABC championships) ===
In 1983, some recruits from the De La Salle squad that was also under the wings of Danding Cojuangco and five naturalized players began training for their ultimate goal of regaining the Asian Basketball Confederation (ABC) title in Hong Kong. The team was composed of Hector Calma, Franz Pumaren, Tonichi Yturri, Alfie Almario, Jun Tan, Joseph Uichico, Teddy Alfarero and naturalized players Dennis Still, Jeff Moore, Chip Engelland, Johnny Nash and John Hegwood.

Upon arrival, they learned that their naturalized Filipinos were not recognized by the ABC and were therefore disallowed from playing. It was resolved by allowing only two of the five to play and this only because they had field in the minimum residency required by the statutes of law for naturalizing foreigners. Using only Dennis Still and Jeff Moore, coach Ron Jacobs piloted the team to a sweep of its qualifying matches and were all set for a showdown with China when the decision come out that the RP squad had used illegal players and therefore - all their games in which the naturalized players were fielded in were forfeited.

The Philippine contingent accepted the decision with bowed heads and finished the tournament in ninth place despite a clean slate.

== PBA (1984–1985) ==
NCC competed as a guest team for four conferences during the 1984 and 1985 PBA seasons and they won the 1985 PBA Reinforced Conference championship. The team went on to represent the Philippines and captured the 1984 Asian Basketball Club Championship in Ipoh, Malaysia, as well as the 1985 William Jones Cup championship (playing as San Miguel Beer). Because of their win at the Asian Interclub Championship, the team represented the Asian region at the 1985 FIBA Club World Cup at Girona, Spain (playing as Northern Consolidated Cement).

The 1984 roster that first participated in the PBA:

Northern Consolidated roster
Players
Coaches

Pos.	No.	Nat.	Name	Ht.	Wt.
F	4	(Philippines)	Jong Uichico	6 ft 1 in (1.85 m)		De La Salle
G	5	(Philippines)	Franz Pumaren	5 ft 9 in (1.75 m)		De La Salle
G	6	(Philippines)	Leoncio Tan	6 ft 0 in (1.83 m)		De La Salle
F	7	(Philippines)	Alfie Almario	6 ft 3 in (1.91 m)		De La Salle
F	8	(Philippines)	Elmer Reyes	6 ft 1 in (1.85 m)		San Beda
F	9	(Philippines)	Ludovico Valenciano	6 ft 1 in (1.85 m)		USLS
F	10	(United States)	Chip Engelland	6 ft 4 in (1.93 m)		Duke
C	11	(Philippines)	Tonichi Yturri	6 ft 5 in (1.96 m)		De La Salle
G	12	(Philippines)	Louie Brill	5 ft 9 in (1.75 m)		San Beda
G	14	(Philippines)	Hector Calma	5 ft 8 in (1.73 m)		Adamson
F	15	(United States)	Jeffrey Moore	6 ft 3 in (1.91 m)		Loyola (MD)
F	16	(Philippines)	Yves Dignadice	6 ft 4 in (1.93 m)		STI WNU
F	17	(Philippines)	Rey Cuenco	6 ft 4 in (1.93 m)		De La Salle Araneta
F	18	(Philippines)	Anthony Mendoza	6 ft 4 in (1.93 m)		Visayas
F/C	19	(Philippines)	Peter Aguilar	6 ft 5 in (1.96 m)		TUA
G	20	(Philippines)	Al Solis	5 ft 11 in (1.80 m)		Visayas
C	18 & 21	(Philippines)	Teddy Alfarero	6 ft 4 in (1.93 m)		De La Salle

Head coach

- (United States) Ron Jacobs

Assistant coach(es)

- (Philippines) Filomeno Pumaren
- (Philippines) Francisco Calilan (Trainer)

Legend

- (C) Team captain
- Injured

In December 1984, UAAP stars Allan Caidic, Pido Jarencio, Benji Gutierrez, Jerry Codiñera, and Leo Austria joined the NCC team playing exhibition games against PBA clubs during the third conference. Northerns second team was coached by veteran coach Francisco Calilan. The first team that went to Malaysia for the Asian Interclub championship were composed of Moore, Engelland, Calma, Joseph Uichico, Franz Pumaren, Leoncio Tan, Elmer Reyes, Tonichi Yturri, Avelino "Samboy" Lim and Yves Dignadice.

Caidic, Jarencio and Codiñera became regular members of the national team in the following year while Leo Austria went on to join the first-ever PBA draft.

== 1985 FIBA Asia Championship ==
In 1985, the members of the NCC team played for the country's national basketball team. The NCC-powered national team won the 1985 Southeast Asian Games basketball tournament and the Asian Basketball Confederation Championship on January 5, 1986, at Kuala Lumpur, Malaysia, tournament which the country had not won since 1973. In winning the ABC Championship, the team qualified for the 1986 World Basketball Championship in Madrid, Spain and the 1986 Goodwill Games. At this time, Jacobs mapped out a new plan to ensure continuity in the national team program. New local players such as Benjie Paras, Alvin Patrimonio, Jerry Codiñera were already being eyed to replace the aging Still and Moore. Engelland, on the other hand, was already honing the shooting skills of Allan Caidic, Naning Valenciano and Pido Jarencio. Amateur star Jojo Lastimosa was expected to fill Engelland's slot on the team in the future (Engelland eventually became the shooting coach of the San Antonio Spurs). However, the NCC program was scrapped in the aftermath of the 1986 People Power Revolution in the Philippines. The Philippines was forced to withdraw from the World Championship as a result.

== Disbandment ==
After the fall of the Marcos government in 1986, the program was scrapped by the Basketball Association of the Philippines (BAP), which was the national basketball governing body of the country at that time. The players of NCC went on to play in the Philippine Basketball Association, with most of them ending up in Cojuangco's San Miguel Beer team. Some of the NCC players would again see action for the national team at the 1990 Asian Games in Beijing, China, which copped a silver medal.

In 1994, the San Miguel Beer PBA team won the 1994 PBA All-Filipino Cup championship and earned the right to represent the country in the upcoming Asian Games, held at Hiroshima, Japan. The national team was composed of the San Miguel players serving as the core of the team and other PBA players (notably Alvin Patrimonio from Purefoods and Johnny Abarrientos from Alaska) and amateur standouts (notably Marlou Aquino from the Philippine Basketball League). The team, led by NCC alumni Allan Caidic and Hector Calma, went on to finish fourth with Caidic finishing as the Asian Games basketball tournament top scorer.

== List of players ==
- Peter Aguilar
- Teddy Alfarero
- Alfie Almario
- Joel Banal
- Louie Brill
- Ricardo Brown
- Allan Caidic
- Hector Calma
- Jerry Codiñera
- Bruce Collins
- Edgardo Cordero
- Rey Cuenco
- Eddie Joe Chavez
- Yves Dignadice
- Arthur "Chip" Engelland
- Angelito Esguerra
- Benjie Gutierrez
- Pido Jarencio
- Federico Lauchengco
- Frankie Lim
- Avelino "Samboy" Lim
- Steve Lingenfelter
- Anthony Mendoza
- Jeffrey Moore
- William Pearson
- Franz Pumaren
- Elmer Reyes
- Steve Schall
- Alfonso Solis
- Dennis Still
- Leoncio "Jun" Tan, Jr.
- Jong Uichico
- Ludovico Valenciano
- Manny Victorino
- Robert Worthy
- Jose Bernardo Yango
- Tonichi Yturri

== PBA season-by-season records ==
Legend
Champion

Runner-up

Semifinalist

Season	Conference	Team name	Elimination round					Playoffs	
Season	Conference	Team name	Finish	GP	W	L	%	Stage	Results
1984	First All-Filipino	Northern Cement	1st/8	14	11	3	.786	Semifinal round Third place playoffs	4th (2–4); Northern Cement 3, Beer Hausen 2
1984	Second All-Filipino	Northern Cement	2nd/8	11	8	3	.727	Semifinal round Second seed playoff Third place playoffs	Tied for 2nd (5–3); Beer Hausen 122, Northern Cement 117; Tanduay 2, Northern Cement 1
1984	Invitational	Northern Cement	Not invited						
1985	Open Conference	Northern Cement	4th/7	12	7	5	.583	Quarterfinal round Semifinal berth playoff Semifinal round Third place playoffs	Tied for 2nd (8–7 overall, 2–1 in round); Northern Cement 98, Manila Beer 75; 3rd (3–3); Northern Cement 4, Tanduay 2
1985	All-Filipino Conference	Northern Cement	Not invited						
1985	Reinforced Conference	Northern Cement	4th/7	12	7	5	.583	Semifinal berth playoffs round 1 Quarterfinal round Semifinal round Second seed playoff Finals	Ginebra 99, Northern Cement 96; 1st (9–6 overall, 2–1 in round); Tied for 2nd (3–3); Northern Cement 123, Great Taste 107; Northern Cement 4, Manila Beer 0
Overall record					63	40	.611		1 championship

== See also ==
- Philippines men's national basketball team
- San Miguel Beermen
