= Teddy Alfarero =

Filipino basketball player

Teodicio Alfarero
Personal information
- Born: April 2, 1963 Baroy, Lanao del Norte, Philippines
- Died: May 5, 2004 (aged 41) Dasmariñas, Cavite, Philippines
- Listed height: 6 ft 4 in (1.93 m)
- Listed weight: 185 lb (84 kg)

Career information
- High school: Lanao del Norte National Comprehensive High School (Baroy, Lanao del Norte)
- College: De La Salle
- PBA draft: 1985: 1st round, 3rd overall pick
- Drafted by: Magnolia Ice Cream
- Playing career: 1985–1987
- Position: Center / power forward
- Number: 14, 20

Career history
- 1985: Great Taste Coffee Makers
- 1986–1987: Alaska Milkmen/Hills Bros
- 1990: Presto Tivoli
Medals
Men's basketball
Representing Philippines
SEA Games
Gold medal – first place	1981 Manila	Team
Gold medal – first place	1983 Singapore	Team

Teddy Alfarero (April 2, 1963 – May 5, 2004) was a Filipino former professional basketball player in the Philippine Basketball Association (PBA).

== Early life ==
Alfarero didn't play organized basketball until his senior year at Lanao del Norte National Comprehensive High School. As a boy, he was tuned into music and played cymbals in his grandfather Enrique's 30-man orchestra that performed in town fiestas and weddings. His father was a saxophonist. He learned to play the sax and trumpet. He grew to 6-1 1/2 as a high school senior and was encouraged by brother Cipriano to take up basketball.

== Collegiate/amateur career ==
In 1978, Alfarero took a 12-hour boat ride from Lanao to Cebu and reported to University of the Visayas coach Jake Rojas for a tryout. Alfarero played a year for the Green Lancers then was recruited to play for La Salle in 1980, where he played for four years.

He was an alternate on the Philippine youth team under coach Turo Valenzona in 1980 and a reliever on the national squad that saw action at the Asian Basketball Confederation (ABC) championships in Calcutta in 1981. He joined Elmer Reyes, Ed Cordero and Franz Pumaren on the Philippine team that won the gold medal at the Southeast Asian Games in 1981. He also took trips to Kuwait, Singapore and China to play hoops.

His most memorable experience was playing as the starting center for the Ron Jacobs-coached Philippine team that captured the Asian Youth crown in Manila in 1982. In the title game, he compiled 10 points and six rebounds in 24 minutes as the Philippines downed China, 74–63.

== Professional career ==
In 1985, Alfarero turned pro and wore the Great Taste colors after a brief stint with Northern Cement as a PBA guest club the year before. He was then acquired by Alaska (a new franchise back then) in 1986 to be part of their inaugural roster. He went on to play for the Alaska Milkmen/Hills Bros. in a three-year pro career. Alfarero briefly returned to the PBA in the 1990 Reinforced Conference playing for Presto Tivoli.

== Death ==
On May 5, 2004, Alfarero died of complications from a liver ailment at the Rizal Memorial Hospital in Dasmariñas, Cavite.
