= David Pope (basketball) =

American basketball player (1962–2016)

- Pope in 1981

Personal information
- Born: April 15, 1962 Newport News, Virginia, U.S.
- Died: October 21, 2016 (aged 54) Hampton, Virginia, U.S.
- Listed height: 6 ft 7 in (2.01 m)
- Listed weight: 220 lb (100 kg)

Career information
- High school: Menchville (Newport News, Virginia)
- College: Norfolk State (1980–1984)
- NBA draft: 1984: 3rd round, 62nd overall pick
- Drafted by: Utah Jazz
- Position: Small forward
- Number: 30, 51

Career history
- 1984: Albuquerque Silvers
- 1984–1985: Kansas City Kings
- 1985–1986: Wyoming Wildcatters
- 1986: Seattle SuperSonics
- 1986–1987: Wyoming Wildcatters

Career highlights
- No. 34 retired by Norfolk State Spartans
- Stats at NBA.com
- Stats at Basketball Reference

David Pope (April 15, 1962 – October 21, 2016) was an American basketball player who played in the National Basketball Association (NBA). Born in Newport News, Virginia, he attended Norfolk State University.

A 6 ft 7 in (2.01 m), 220 lb (100 kg) small forward, Pope was selected in the third round (62nd overall) of the 1984 NBA draft by the Utah Jazz. His short playing career lasted from 1984–86 with the Kansas City Kings and the Seattle SuperSonics. He died at the age of 54 on October 21, 2016.

== Career statistics ==
Legend
GP	Games played	GS	Games started	MPG	Minutes per game
FG%	Field goal percentage	3P%	3-point field goal percentage	FT%	Free throw percentage
RPG	Rebounds per game	APG	Assists per game	SPG	Steals per game
BPG	Blocks per game	PPG	Points per game	**Bold**	Career high

=== NBA ===
==== Regular season ====
Year	Team	GP	GS	MPG	FG%	3P%	FT%	RPG	APG	SPG	BPG	PPG
1984–85	Kansas City	**22**	0	5.9	.321	.000	**.538**	.8	.2	.1	**.1**	**1.9**
1985–86	Seattle	11	0	**6.7**	**.450**	**1.000**	.500	**1.0**	**.4**	**.2**	**.1**	**1.9**
Career		33	0	6.2	.356	.500	.529	.9	.3	.2	.1	1.9
