= Joey Loyzaga =

Filipino basketball player (born 1961)

Personal information
- Born: September 23, 1961 (age 65)
- Listed height: 6 ft 0 in (1.83 m)

Career information
- High school: San Beda (Manila)
- College: San Beda; Arellano
- Playing career: 1984–2000
- Position: Shooting guard
- Number: 14, 17, 41

Career history
- 1984-1985: Magnolia Ice Cream
- 1986–1989: Ginebra San Miguel
- 1990-1991: Pop Cola/Diet Sarsi
- 1992-1993: Shell Turbo Chargers
- 1994: Ginebra San Miguel
- 1998–2000: Alaska Aces

Career highlights
- 4× PBA champion (1986 Open, 1988 All-Filipino, 1992 First, 2000 All-Filipino)
Medals
Men's basketball
Representing Philippines
SEA Games
| Gold medal – first place | 1983 Singapore | Team |

Ernesto Jose Francisco "Joey" Cuerva Loyzaga (born September 23, 1961) is a Filipino retired professional basketball player.

== Collegiate / amateur career ==
Loyzaga broke into the hoops limelight as a Red Cub for San Beda College in the National Collegiate Athletic Association (Philippines). He was elevated to the senior Red Lions where he spent the next three years as a starter for then-SBC coach Loreto Carbonell.

Starting in 1980, Loyzaga saw action in the Interclub and MICAA tournaments. He moved from Mendiola to the Legarda campus of the Arellano University because of the strict policy of the NCAA regarding participation in commercial leagues.

== National team career ==
Loyzaga also saw action as a national team campaigner in the 1982 Asian Games in New Delhi, India, under coach Nat Canson, as well as being part of the champion Philippine squad of coach Larry Albano, which brought home the 1983 SEA Games basketball crown.

== PBA career ==
Loyzaga played professional basketball in the Philippine Basketball Association starting in 1984. He was one of the two rookies signed by Gold Eagle Beer that season and reunited with former mentor Nat Canson. When the SMC franchise took a leave of absence in the 1986 PBA season, Loyzaga found his way with the league's most popular team; Ginebra San Miguel, and became teammates with older brother Chito Loyzaga. They won two championships together at Ginebra and Joey's most memorable finals performance was the title-clinching Game four of the 1988 All-Filipino finals against Purefoods where he topscored for the team, together with playing-coach Robert Jaworski, with 28 points apiece.

Loyzaga was dropped from the Añejo (formerly Ginebra) lineup beginning the 1990 PBA season and was picked by expansion franchise Pop Cola from the pool. He spent two seasons with the RFM ballclub before moving to Shell and played for two years as well. Loyzaga did return to Ginebra for one season in 1994 but his career was already downhill at that point, he managed to stage a comeback four years later with Alaska.

== Personal life ==
Loyzaga is the son of Philippine basketball great Carlos Loyzaga and Vicky Cuerva. He and brother Chito Loyzaga became one of the few siblings to have played in the PBA, eventually playing together with Ginebra San Miguel. He was once romantically linked to actress Gretchen Barretto.

Loyzaga currently lives in Australia with his family.
