= 1985 PBA season =

11th PBA season

- Duration: March 3 – November 28, 1985
- Teams: 6 + 1
- TV partner: Vintage Sports (MBS)

1985 PBA Draft
- Top draft pick: Sonny Cabatu
- Picked by: Shell Azodrin Bugbusters
- Season MVP: Ricardo Brown (Great Taste Coffee Makers)
- Open Conference champions: Great Taste Coffee Makers
- Open Conference runners-up: Magnolia Ice Cream Makers
- All-Filipino Conference champions: Great Taste Coffee Makers
- All-Filipino Conference runners-up: Shell Azodrin Bugbusters
- Reinforced Conference champions: Northern Consolidated (NCC)
- Reinforced Conference runners-up: Manila Beer Brewmasters

Seasons
- ← 1984 1986 →

The 1985 PBA season was the 11th season of the Philippine Basketball Association (PBA).

== Board of governors ==
=== Executive committee ===
- Mariano A. Yenko, Jr. (Commissioner)
- Tomas L. Manotoc (Deputy Commissioner)
- Carlos Palanca III (President, representing Ginebra San Miguel)
- Qurino Marquinez (Vice-President, representing Great Taste Coffee Makers)
- Andrew H. Jao (Treasurer, representing Manila Beer Brewmasters)

=== Teams ===
Team	Company	Governor
Ginebra San Miguel	La Tondeña Incorporada	Carlos Palanca III
Great Taste Coffee Makers	Consolidated Foods Corporation	Quirino Marquinez
Manila Beer Brewmasters	Shareholdings, Inc.	Andrew H. Jao
San Miguel Beermen	San Miguel Corporation	Leonides Valencia
Shell Azodrin Bugbusters	Shell Chemicals Philippines	Rafael Hernaez
Tanduay Rhum Makers	Elizalde & Company; Tanduay Distillers, Inc.	Johnny Jose

== Season highlights ==
- The season marked the first time without the famed Crispa Redmanizers participating in the league. New team Shell Azodrin Bugbusters takes over the franchise of the defunct winningest ballclub.
- The PBA found a new home in the University of Life Theater and Recreational Arena (ULTRA) in Pasig after 10 years of playing at the Araneta Coliseum.
- The Great Taste Coffee Makers continued its dynasty as they won their fourth straight title during the season and almost a Grandslam of sorts.
- A blockbuster trade took place between two-time MVP Ramon Fernandez of Manila Beer switching places with one-time MVP Abet Guidaben of Tanduay. Fernandez played his first game with the Rhum Makers starting in October.
- The year saw the birth of a never-say-die squad known as Ginebra San Miguel with the 'Big J' Sonny Jaworski becoming the player-coach of the team starting the season. The Magnolia ballclub also offered the role of playing-coach to their returning import Norman Black at the start of the year.
- Guest amateur team Northern Consolidated (NCC) won the PBA Third Conference crown over the Manila Beer Brewmasters and recorded the first-ever 4–0 finals sweep in league history.

== Opening ceremonies ==
The muses for the participating teams are as follows:

Team	Muse
Ginebra San Miguel	Katherine Sta.Maria
Great Taste Coffee Makers	Lisa Stanley
Magnolia Ice Cream	Desiree Verdadero
Manila Beer Brewmasters	Lani Mercado
Northern Consolidated (NCC)	Marivic Roldan
Shell Azodrin Bugbusters	Lyka Ugarte
Tanduay Rhum Makers	

== Champions ==
- Open Conference: Great Taste Coffee Makers
- All-Filipino Conference: Great Taste Coffee Makers
- Reinforced Conference: Northern Consolidated (NCC)
- Team with best win–loss percentage: Great Taste Coffee Makers (44–27, .620)
- Best Team of the Year: Great Taste Coffee Makers (2nd)

== Open Conference ==
=== Elimination round ===
Pos	Team	W	L	PCT	GB	Qualification
1	Great Taste Coffee Makers	8	4	.667	—	Advance to semifinal round
2	Tanduay Rhum Makers	8	4	.667	—	Advance to semifinal round
3	Magnolia Ice Cream Makers	7	5	.583	1	Proceed to quarterfinal round
4	Northern Cement (G)	7	5	.583	1	Proceed to quarterfinal round
5	Manila Beer Brewmasters	5	7	.417	3	Proceed to quarterfinal round
6	Shell Azodrin Bugbusters	4	8	.333	4	Proceed to quarterfinal round
7	Ginebra San Miguel	3	9	.250	5	

(G) Guests

=== Quarterfinal round ===
Pos	Team	W	L	PCT	GB	Qualification
3	Magnolia Ice Cream Makers	9	6	.600	—	Semifinal round
4	Northern Cement (G)	8	7	.533 (Note: Semifinal berth playoff: Northern Cement 98–75 Manila Beer)	1	Semifinal round
5	Manila Beer Brewmasters	8	7	.533	1	
6	Shell Azodrin Bugbusters	4	11	.267	5	

(G) Guests

=== Semifinal round ===
Pos	Team	W	L	PCT	GB	Qualification
1	Great Taste Coffee Makers	5	1	.833	—	Advance to the Finals
2	Magnolia Ice Cream Makers	4	2	.667	1	Advance to the Finals
3	Northern Cement (G)	3	3	.500	2	Proceed to third place playoff
4	Tanduay Rhum Makers	0	6	.000	5	Proceed to third place playoff

(G) Guests

=== Third place playoffs ===
Team 1	Series	Team 2	Game 1	Game 2	Game 3	Game 4	Game 5	Game 6	Game 7
(3) Northern Cement	4–2	(4) Tanduay Rhum Makers	107–112	110–98	100–93	104–110	113–82	121–110	—

=== Finals ===
Team 1	Series	Team 2	Game 1	Game 2	Game 3	Game 4	Game 5	Game 6	Game 7
(1) Great Taste Coffee Makers	4–2	(2) Magnolia Ice Cream Makers	108–99	105–111	103–97	93–95	121–95	122–104	—

- Best Import of the Conference: Norman Black (Magnolia)

== All-Filipino Conference ==
=== Elimination round ===
Pos	Team	W	L	PCT	GB	Qualification
1	Great Taste Coffee Makers	8	2	.800	—	Semifinal round
2	Shell Azodrin Bugbusters	5	5	.500	3	Semifinal round
3	Tanduay Rhum Makers	5	5	.500	3	Semifinal round
4	Ginebra San Miguel	5	5	.500	3	Semifinal round
5	Manila Beer Brewmasters	4	6	.400	4	
6	Magnolia Ice Cream Makers	3	7	.300	5	

=== Semifinal round ===
Pos	Team	W	L	PCT	GB	Qualification
1	Great Taste Coffee Makers	12	4	.750	—	Advance to the finals
2	Shell Azodrin Bugbusters	8	8	.500 (Note: Second-seed playoff: Shell 89–76 Ginebra)	4	Advance to the finals
3	Ginebra San Miguel	8	8	.500	4	Proceed to third-place playoff
4	Tanduay Rhum Makers	7	9	.438	5	Proceed to third-place playoff

=== Third place playoffs ===
Team 1	Series	Team 2	Game 1	Game 2	Game 3	Game 4	Game 5
(3) Ginebra San Miguel	2–2 (Note: The PBA finals ended earlier than the third-place playoffs. Rather than continue the series, the team that won more games in the series was named third place. As both teams won an identical number of games (2), the team that scored the most points in the series up to that point (Ginebra 431–433 Tanduay) was named third place.)	(4) Tanduay Rhum Makers	115–122 (OT)	110–108	106–97	102–104	—

=== Finals ===
Team 1	Series	Team 2	Game 1	Game 2	Game 3	Game 4	Game 5
(1) Great Taste Coffee Makers	3–1	(2) Shell Azodrin Bugbusters	103–98	113–106	102–103	110–91	—

== Reinforced Conference ==
=== Elimination round ===
Pos	Team	W	L	PCT	GB	Qualification
1	Manila Beer Brewmasters	9	3	.750	—	Advance to semifinal round
2	Ginebra San Miguel	7	5	.583 (Note: Head-to-head quotient: Magnolia 1.033, Ginebra 1.000, Northern 0.967; semifinal berth playoffs: Ginebra 99–96 Northern, Ginebra 106–98 Magnolia)	2	Advance to semifinal round
3	Magnolia Quench Plus	7	5	.583	2	Proceed to quarterfinal round
4	Northern Cement (G)	7	5	.583	2	Proceed to quarterfinal round
5	Great Taste Coffee Makers	6	6	.500	3	Proceed to quarterfinal round
6	Tanduay Rhum Makers	4	8	.333	5	Proceed to quarterfinal round
7	Shell Azodrin Bugbusters	2	10	.167	7	

(G) Guests

=== Quarterfinal round ===
Pos	Team	W	L	PCT	GB	Qualification
3	Northern Cement (G)	9	6	.600	—	Semifinal round
4	Great Taste Coffee Makers	8	7	.533 (Note: Semifinal berth playoff: Great Taste 99–95 Magnolia)	1	Semifinal round
5	Magnolia Quench Plus	8	7	.533	1	
6	Tanduay Rhum Makers	5	10	.333	4	

(G) Guests

=== Semifinal round ===
Pos	Team	W	L	PCT	GB	Qualification
1	Manila Beer Brewmasters	4	2	.667	—	Advance to the finals
2	Northern Cement (G)	3	3	.500 (Note: Second-seed playoff, Northern 123–107 Great Taste)	1	Advance to the finals
3	Great Taste Coffee Makers	3	3	.500	1	Proceed to third-place playoff
4	Ginebra San Miguel	2	4	.333	2	Proceed to third-place playoff

(G) Guests

=== Third place playoffs ===
Team 1	Series	Team 2	Game 1	Game 2	Game 3	Game 4	Game 5	Game 6	Game 7
(3) Great Taste Coffee Makers	0–4	(4) Ginebra San Miguel	168–197	133–139	126–155	124–145	—	—	—

=== Finals ===
Team 1	Series	Team 2	Game 1	Game 2	Game 3	Game 4	Game 5	Game 6	Game 7
(1) Manila Beer Brewmasters	0–4	(2) Northern Cement	102–139	117–133	113–130	106–138	—	—	—

- Best Import of the Conference: Michael Hackett (Ginebra)

== Awards ==
- Most Valuable Player: Ricardo Brown (Great Taste)
- Rookie of the Year: Leo Austria (Shell)
- Most Improved Player: Padim Israel (Tanduay)
- Best Import (Open): Norman Black (Magnolia)
- Best Import (Reinforced): Michael Hackett (Ginebra)
- Mythical Five:
  - Ricardo Brown (Great Taste)
  - Willie Pearson (Great Taste)
  - Abet Guidaben (Tanduay/Manila Beer)
  - Manny Victorino (Great Taste)
  - Bogs Adornado (Shell)
- Mythical Second Team:
  - Robert Jaworski (Ginebra)
  - Willie Generalao (Tanduay)
  - Ramon Fernandez (Manila Beer/Tanduay)
  - Philip Cezar (Shell)
  - Abe King (Great Taste)
- All-Defensive Team:
  - Chito Loyzaga (Ginebra)
  - Philip Cezar (Shell)
  - Elpidio Villamin (Manila Beer)
  - Robert Jaworski (Ginebra)
  - Abe King (Great Taste)

== Cumulative standings ==
Pos	Team	Pld	W	L	PCT	Best finish
1	Great Taste Coffee Makers	71	44	27	.620	Champions
2	Northern Cement (G)	55	34	21	.618	Champions
3	Ginebra San Miguel	56	28	28	.500	Third place
4	Manila Beer Brewmasters	48	24	24	.500	Finalist
5	Magnolia Ice Cream Makers/Quench Plus	54	26	28	.481	Finalist
6	Tanduay Rhum Makers	47	15	32	.319	Third place
7	Shell Azodrin Bugbusters	47	15	32	.319	Finalist

(G) Guests

=== Elimination round ===
Pos	Team	Pld	W	L	PCT
1	Great Taste Coffee Makers	34	22	12	.647
2	Northern Cement (G)	24	14	10	.583
3	Manila Beer Brewmasters	34	18	16	.529
4	Tanduay Rhum Makers	34	17	17	.500
5	Magnolia Ice Cream Makers/Quench Plus	34	17	17	.500
6	Ginebra San Miguel	34	15	19	.441
7	Shell Azodrin Bugbusters	34	11	23	.324

(G) Guests

=== Playoffs ===
Pos	Team	Pld	W	L
1	Great Taste Coffee Makers	37	22	15
2	Northern Cement (G)	31	20	11
3	Ginebra San Miguel	22	13	9
4	Magnolia Ice Cream Makers/Quench Plus	20	9	11
5	Tanduay Rhum Makers	25	7	18
6	Manila Beer Brewmasters	14	6	8
7	Shell Azodrin Bugbusters	13	4	9

(G) Guests
