= 1985 Magnolia Quench Plus season =

- Head coach: Norman Black
- Owner: San Miguel Corporation

Open Conference results
- Record: 15–12 (55.6%)
- Place: 2nd
- Playoff finish: Finals (lost to Great Taste)

All Filipino Conference results
- Record: 3–7 (30%)
- Place: 6th
- Playoff finish: N/A

Reinforced Conference results
- Record: 8–9 (47.1%)
- Place: 5th
- Playoff finish: Quarterfinals

Magnolia Quench Plus seasons

The 1985 Magnolia Quench Plus season was the 11th season of the franchise in the Philippine Basketball Association (PBA). Known as Magnolia Ice Cream Makers in the Open Conference and All Filipino Conference.

== Award ==
Playing-coach Norman Black won Best Import honors in the Open Conference.

== Finals stint ==
Magnolia Ice Cream Makers, the former Gold Eagle Beermen in the previous year, started the 1985 PBA season with a bang with returning import Norman Black now as the team's playing coach. In the Open Conference, Magnolia battled tremendous odds in reaching the finals with Black leading the charge. Standing only at 6-5, Black outhustled and outwitted opposing imports who were taller than him in steering Magnolia to a best-of-seven finals showdown with powerhouse Great Taste for the first conference crown.

A decided underdog, Magnolia defied the skeptics and held Great Taste on even terms with two wins apiece before folding up to lose the series in six games. It was the ballclub's second runner-up finish in 11 years as a PBA founding franchise.

== The end of the road ==
In the Reinforced Conference, Magnolia carry a new product as Quench Plus. After losing their first game to Great Taste by one point, the Thirst Quenchers won seven of their next eight games to overtake Manila Beer on top of the standings. But Magnolia blew hot and cold, dropping their last three matches in the eliminations and lost to Ginebra in the playoff for an outright semifinals berth on October 24. The Thirst Quenchers' 105-93 win over NCC at the start of the quarterfinal round proved to be their last hurrah. Magnolia lost three chances to clinch a semifinals seat when they were beaten by Tanduay Rhum Makers, who played a spoiler's role, and losing twice to Great Taste.

On October 31, Magnolia took the first three quarters against Great Taste, who were forced to go all-filipino the rest of the way when import Cory Blackwell sprained his left ankle in the second quarter. The Coffee Makers seems all set to bid their grandslam hopes goodbye when things suddenly looked up for them in the fourth quarter when Norman Black fouled out and Magnolia's strength waned. Great Taste won in the end, 106-101. The victory by the Coffee Makers forces a do-or-die playoff game with Magnolia for the last semifinals berth.

The end of the match saw Magnolia's Biboy Ravanes confronting Chito Loyzaga of Great Taste. Ravanes' teammate Joey Loyzaga tried to pacify the protagonists in the post-game when an irate Rudy Distrito let go a kick that landed on his teammate Joey Loyzaga. GAB representative Caloy Loyzaga, seeing the injustice done to his sons, joined the fracas and hit Distrito. An unidentified spectator fired three shots in the air to halt the commotion. A day later, Distrito, Ravanes and the Loyzagas were summoned to the PBA Commissioner's office. Distrito was given a stiff fine plus a three-game suspension.

Rudy Distrito serve a suspension meted for sparking a melee and sat out in the knockout game on November 3, the lack of local support for Norman Black was clearly evident in Magnolia's final appearance in the third conference. The depleted-Magnolia lost to Great Taste for the fourth time in the conference, 95-99, to seal its fate as a semifinal outcast.

== Won-loss records vs Opponents ==
Team	Win	Loss	1st (Open)	2nd (All-Filipino)	3rd (Reinforced)
Ginebra	4	3	2-0	1-1	1-2
Great Taste	3	13	3-7	0-2	0-4
Manila Beer	4	3	1-2	1-1	1-1
Northern (NCC)	7	1	4-1	N/A	3-0
Shell	3	4	2-1	0-2	1-1
Tanduay	5	4	3-1	1-1	2-1
Total	26	28	15-12	3-7	8-9

== Roster ==
1985 Magnolia Quench Plus roster
Players

Pos.	#	POB	Name	Height	Weight	DOB (YYYY–MM–DD)	From
G	5	(Philippines)	Biboy Ravanes	6 ft 0 in (1.83 m)			Cebu
F	6 & 11	(Philippines)	Jesus Migalbin	6 ft 3 in (1.91 m)			San Agustin
G	7	(Philippines)	Marte Saldaña	5 ft 11 in (1.80 m)			Far Eastern
C	8	(Philippines)	Noli Banate	6 ft 5 in (1.96 m)			Mindanao
F	9	(Philippines)	Renato Lobo	6 ft 2 in (1.88 m)			Far Eastern
G/F	10	(Philippines)	Dante Gonzalgo	6 ft 1 in (1.85 m)			Lyceum
F	13	(Philippines)	Manny Paner	6 ft 3 in (1.91 m)			Visayas
G	14	(Philippines)	Joey Loyzaga	6 ft 1 in (1.85 m)			San Beda
C	20	(Philippines)	Carlson Samlani	6 ft 5 in (1.96 m)			San Sebastian
F/C	24	(United States)	Norman Black (I)	6 ft 5 in (1.96 m)			Saint Joseph's
G	37	(Philippines)	Federico Lauchengco	6 ft 0 in (1.83 m)			Far Eastern
G	44	(Philippines)	Rudy Distrito	5 ft 11 in (1.80 m)			UE

Coaches

Head coach

- (United States) Norman Black

Assistant coach(es)

- (Philippines) Derrick Pumaren

Team manager

- (Philippines) Sonny Valencia

Legend

- (C) Team captain
- (I) Import
- Injured
