= Ed Cordero =

Filipino basketball player, coach and executive (b. 1955)

Commissioner of the University Athletic Association of the Philippines Basketball
- In office 2007–2008
- Preceded by: Elmer Yanga
- Succeeded by: Chito Narvasa
- Basketball career

Personal information
- Born: November 29, 1955 (age 70)
- Listed height: 6 ft 3 in (1.91 m)
- Listed weight: 180 lb (82 kg)

Career information
- College: UST
- Position: Power forward/Center
- Number: 3, 88

Career history

Playing
- 1982–1983: Toyota Super Corollas
- 1984–1986: Manila Beer Brewmasters
- 1987: Tanduay Rhum Makers
- 1988–1989: Shell Rimula X
- 1990: Alaska Milkmen

Coaching
- 2012–2018: Mapua (assistant)
- 2018–2020: Perpetual (assistant)

Career highlights
- As executive: 3x PBA champion (1982 Reinforced Filipino, 1982 Open, 1987 Open)
Medals
Men's basketball
Representing Philippines
SEA Games
Gold medal – first place	1981 Manila	Team

Edgardo "Ed" Cordero (November 29, 1955) is a Filipino basketball player, coach, and executive.

== Playing career ==
=== Collegiate ===
Cordero played college ball for UST, and made history by scoring a career-high of 54 points in a victory against Adamson in Loyola Center on July 29, 1979. He also played for the 1981 Philippine team who competed at the 1981 SEA Games, which the country hosted.

=== Professional ===
Cordero started to play professionally in 1982 at Toyota Super Corollas, and played on the team until its disbandment. In 1984, he played for Manila Beer Brewmasters until its disbandment in 1986. In 1987, he played for the Tanduay Rhum Makers and won a championship on its last season. In 1988 until 1989, he played for Formula Shell and in 1990 at Alaska Air Force.

== Coaching career ==
Cordero served as an assistant coach for Mapúa Cardinals under Atoy Co, and Perpetual Altas. There's an instance in Mapúa that he coached the team for a game and lead them to victory in 2015. While as an assistant at Perpetual, he applied to be his alma mater's head coach, but wasn't chosen. He is one of the coaching staff members of Perpetual who wasn't renewed or retained.

== Executive career ==
In 2004, he served as general manager of the Purefoods Tender Juicy Hotdogs until 2005.

Cordero served as the commissioner for the 70th season of the UAAP basketball.

He is currently serves as the commissioner of the UNTV Cup.
