= Abe King =

Filipino basketball player

Personal information
- Born: July 23, 1957 (age 69)
- Listed height: 6 ft 3 in (1.91 m)
- Listed weight: 192 lb (87 kg)

Career information
- College: San Beda
- PBA draft: 1977
- Drafted by: Toyota Super Corollas
- Playing career: 1977–1994
- Position: Forward/center

Career history
- 1977–1983: Toyota
- 1984: Gold Eagle
- 1985–1992: Great Taste
- 1993–1994: Purefoods

Career highlights
- 13x PBA champion; PBA Mythical First Team (1982); PBA Mythical Second Team (1985); 50 Greatest Players in PBA History (2025 selection)

Abraham Columbus M. King, Jr. (born July 23, 1957) is a Filipino former basketball player who was part of the champion Philippine Basketball Association (PBA) ballclub Toyota Tamaraws. He was the starting center of 1976 MICAA champion Crown Motors before its PBA parent team, the Toyota Tamaraws, called upon his services at the start of the 1977 PBA season. Despite being renowned for his defensive prowess, King had recorded a 60-point game.

== PBA career ==
King was an instant starter for the Tamaraws as resident power forward when Alberto "Big Boy" Reynoso retired at the end of the 1976 season. King joined forces with Ramon Fernandez, Robert Jaworski, Francis Arnaiz and 1976 Rookie Of The Year Virgilio "Gil" Cortez in the starting unit of the Tamaraws (original starting forward Rodolfo "Ompong Segura suffered a knee injury during the 1976 season that allowed Cortez to blossom that season). King became a major force to reckon with, and almost won ROY honors, barely losing to eventual winner and co-power forward Jimmy Taguines of Yco-Tanduay in a tight race.

King's accomplishments, though, were somewhat diminished by the performance of his more accomplished teammates. The year after he joined the league, Jaworski ruled the roost by averaging close to triple-double the entire season en route to the MVP award. In 1979, Fernandez narrowly lost out to Fortunato "Atoy" Co, Jr. in a tight MVP race that was decided by the media votes. Fernandez, though, proved that he was the best player of the season as he powered the Tamaraws to a runner-up and championship finish in the succeeding two conferences. Co won the MVP title after the 1st Conference—one of the quirks of the PBA rules back then – and since Crispa won the title, the Fortune Cookie, despite ending up second to Fernandez in the stats race in the AFC, romped away with the honors.

1982 was considered as King's best year with Toyota. The same year when Jaworski was riding the bench because of an assortment of injuries, it was the quartet of Fernandez, Arnaiz, and 1979 ROY Arnie Tuadles and King, who starred in Toyota's two championships that season —the same year when Fernandez finally nailed his first of four MVP plums, with King being named to the season's Mythical Five. What made King's accomplishments impressive was that he did this on the other side of the game —his defence. While every player was getting recognition for their offence, King did so on defense , a skill further enhanced by his coach, Edgardo Ocampo – acknowledged as the 1960s best two-way player. King was the nemesis not only of the best local players around, but he also took it upon himself to defend against the best imports. Norman Black, Lew Massey, Lew Brown, and Clarence Kea, among others, were surprised at how a bulky local player could actually hold his own against them. Black intimated once in an interview that King was "the best local defender, whoever guarded him." Alvin Patrimonio, during his peak in the early 1990s, badly wanted an ageing king to be part of Purefoods simply because he feared having a king on the other side of the court defending him. Finally, a PBA player was recognized for his ability to defend players and King became the yardstick of what defenders should be in the coming years.

=== Out of the shadows of Jaworski and Fernandez ===
When Toyota disbanded prior to the start of the 1984 season, there was much outcry regarding the transfer of the players to Beer Hausen, the team that bought the Silverio franchise. Jaworski and Arnaiz eventually went to Ginebra San Miguel while King became the first "franchise player" in the history of the league when he signed up with Beer Hausen's corporate rival Gold Eagle Beer. King latched upon the deal with Gold Eagle Beer prior to the disbandment of Toyota, which excluded him in that "lock, stock and barrel" purchase by Basic Holdings of Toyota's franchise.

Since King wasn't a noted scorer, he needed players who could take over the offensive positions, as he took it upon himself to lead the Gold Eagle team on the defensive end. However, his teammates were also more defense-based, and less skilled at offense, so Gold Eagle struggled big time. San Miguel, the mother company of Gold Eagle, was also focusing its resources more on the PBL and NCC teams, so Gold Eagle couldn't get the players they wanted to be competitive against teams such as Great Taste Coffee, Beer Hausen and Tanduay Rhum.

Eventually, King moved to Great Taste in the succeeding year with manager Ignacio Gotao spearheading this transfer. King found himself in unfamiliar company with past Crispa rivals Co, Bernie Fabiosa and Philip Cezar, as well as super rookie Allan Caidic. He, along with Cezar, became the team's leaders.

King only had one contrapelo among the players during his time, his own Toyota teammate, Fernandez, who knew King's moves extremely well. Ditto the other way, as King was also equally successful in guarding against Fernandez, although the latter had more success in their matchups. This wasn't really surprising, as King wasn't the only player who had Don Ramon as a contrapelo or scourge. The top centers and power forwards back then also suffered offensively when ranged against El Presidente – Gary Vargas, Rey Lazaro, Abet Guidaben, Terry Saldaña, Manny Victorino and Dondon Ampalayo feared Fernandez like a plague. King, though, wasn't far behind in the intimidation factor as he was also the scourge of many slotmen.

=== Twilight ===
However, an ageing King suddenly found no takers during the early 1990s. Patrimonio heard of King's interest in joining Tondeña and pleaded with Purefoods management to get King "at all costs." Purefoods relented and signed up King for a one-season contract with the Hotdogs where he played a major role as the defensive player assigned to guard the imports of the other teams. From a one-season stint with Purefoods, King's contract with the team was extended to another year. He won his last two PBA championships with the Hotdogs.

King faded from the limelight in the mid-1990s and decided to move to the United States. He was the president of the PBA Legends Foundation USA.
