= Ricardo Brown (basketball) =

Filipino-American basketball player (born 1957)

Personal information
- Born: May 22, 1957 (age 69) Brooklyn, New York, U.S.
- Listed height: 6 ft 1 in (1.85 m)

Career information
- High school: Edwardsville (Edwardsville, Illinois)
- College: Centenary (1975–1976); Yavapai JC (1976–1977); Pepperdine (1978–1980); De La Salle
- NBA draft: 1979: 3rd round, 59th overall pick
- Drafted by: Houston Rockets
- Playing career: 1980–1990
- Position: Point guard
- Number: 23

Career history
- 1983–1987: Great Taste Coffee Makers
- 1988–1990: San Miguel Beermen

Career highlights
- 8× PBA champion (1984 Second All-Filipino, 1984 Invitational, 1985 Open, 1985 All-Filipino, 1987 All-Filipino, 1988 Open, 1988 Reinforced, 1989 Reinforced); PBA Most Valuable Player (1985); PBA Rookie of the Year (1983); PBA Mythical Five (1983); 4× PBA Mythical First Team (1984–1986, 1988); PBA Mythical Second Team (1987); 3× PBA scoring champion (1985–1987); PBA All-time Scoring Average leader; PBA All-time Assists Average leader; 50 Greatest Players in PBA History (2000 selection); PBA Hall of Fame in 2009
- Stats at Basketball Reference

Ricardo Vidal Brown (born May 22, 1957) is a Filipino-American former professional basketball player. His moniker was The Quick Brown Fox.

== Career ==
Brown played for a diverse set of colleges in the United States. His performances became notable that he would later be drafted by the Houston Rockets for the 59th overall pick in the 3rd Round of the 1979 NBA Draft. Though he was not signed to any team, Brown continued to play collegiate basketball, eventually being discovered by Eduardo Cojuangco Jr. in the United States and would thereafter move to the Philippines. He had a notable career playing for the De La Salle Green Archers during many different tournaments in 1982. He would simultaneously enroll and take classes there for the remainder of the year before declaring his intention to enter the PBA.

A year after his notable college career in DLSU, Brown moved on to play professional basketball in the PBA in 1983. It was here where he became famous in the professional stage as the first-ever Filipino-American to play as a 'local' in the league. He was the 1983 Rookie of the Year and 1985 MVP. He was also included in the Mythical Five selection in 1983, 1984, 1985, 1986, and 1988. In 1983, he was only the 2nd player ever to win the coveted Rookie of the Year Award and also be named to the Mythical Five Team. In that same Rookie Year, Ricky was in a close race for league MVP with teammate Bogs Adornado and eventual MVP, Abet Guidaben. In 1985, Ricky's best year in the PBA, The Quick Brown Fox was simply awesome. He regularly scored more than 30 points per game as well as have double figures in assists. His high game that year was 56 points against Ginebra, but what many people forget is that Ricky had back-to-back 40+ games in the PBA Open Championship versus Norman Black and Magnolia. During Ricky's somewhat brief career in the PBA (only 7 years and 19 Conferences), Ricky played for the Great Taste Coffee Makers and the San Miguel Beermen, where he won a total of 9 championships during his PBA career. His ball handling skills, without question head and shoulders more advanced than any Filipino in the PBA during that era, his ability to evade defenders with intelligence and quickness, the skillset to score at will from anywhere on the court, and great presence and vision on the court to produce pin point assists made him one of the best point guards and combo guards ever to play in the PBA. Even though Ricky last played more than 27 years ago, he still holds the All-time PBA career scoring average (23.1 ppg) and PBA All-time Best Assist Average (7.3 per game), as well as the best FT percentage over a career at 87.9%.

In 1989, the year of San Miguel's Grand Slam (three championships in one year), he was an integral member of a powerhouse squad that included future Hall of Famers Hector Calma, Samboy Lim, and Ramon Fernandez. Brown would eventually go down in PBA history as one of the finest players and sportsmen to ever grace the hardcourts of the Philippines.

== Legacy ==
In 2000, Brown was named a member of the PBA's 25 Greatest Players. In 2009, he was inducted into the PBA Hall of Fame along with former teammates Allan Caidic, Samboy Lim, and Hector Calma. Ricky's honors in the PBA are numerous. Among these awards include Rookie of the Year and Mythical Five (1983) in the same year becoming only the 2nd player to ever achieve that honor; a Mythical Five selection in 1984, 1985, 1986, and 1988; Most Valuable Player in 1985; and 7 PBA Championships with both Great Taste and San Miguel Beer. To this day, Ricky still holds the highest career average for points per game (23) and assists (7) and the highest FT percentage.

== Personal life ==
Brown's parents were married in Manila in 1945 and moved to the United States the next year. His father Lee Brown was an American serviceman and a former major leaguer with the St. Louis Cardinals in the MLB. Brown's mother, the former Conrada Vidal, had a family-owned photography shop in Santa Cruz, Manila. Brown has two brothers and a sister born in the Philippines. Ricardo is married to the former Lorma Sahagun, a Filipina from Ilocos Norte, and has two sons, Justin and Kevan. Kevan was born in Cardinal Santos Hospital in Greenhills, San Juan, located in Metro Manila.

== In other media ==
Brown made a movie with the comedy king, Dolphy, in 1987 titled Action is Not Missing, which was an entry to the Metro Manila Film Festival and a box-office hit.

== Post-retirement ==
Ricky has been in education since 1981, first as a teacher, then a dean of students, assistant principal, and principal. In 2008, he became the first Filipino-American principal in the ABC Unified School District. Brown remained principal at Ross Academy of Creative and Media Arts, a school that became a California School To Watch and a California Gold Ribbon School during his tenure, for nine years. In June 2017, Brown became principal of Tracy High School, a Continuation School and Alternative Education Program, also in the ABC Unified School District. In 2019, Tracy was selected as a California Model Continuation School for excellence in providing a quality education and experience for its students.
