= Michael Hackett (basketball) =

American basketball player (born 1960)

Personal information
- Born: May 11, 1960 (age 66) Orangeburg, South Carolina, U.S.
- Listed height: 6 ft 5 in (1.96 m)
- Listed weight: 210 lb (95 kg)

Career information
- High school: Wilkinson (Orangeburg, South Carolina)
- College: Jacksonville (1978–1982)
- NBA draft: 1982: 3rd round, 67th overall pick
- Drafted by: Los Angeles Lakers
- Playing career: 1984–1988
- Position: Center / power forward
- Number: 00

Career history
- 1984: Guaiqueríes de Margarita
- 1985–1988: Ginebra San Miguel
- 1990–1991: Beitar Tel Aviv
- 1993–1994: Hapoel Afula

Career highlights
- Israeli League Top Scorer (1991); PBA champion (1986 Open, 1988 PBA-IBA Cup (Special Conference)); PBA Best Import of the Conference (1985); Liga Profesional de Baloncesto MVP (1984)
- Stats at Basketball Reference

Michael Hackett (born May 11, 1960) is an American former professional basketball player. He was the Liga Profesional de Baloncesto MVP in 1984, and the Israeli League Top Scorer in 1991.

== Basketball career ==
He attended Jacksonville University, where he was considered by University of Alabama at Birmingham coach Gene Bartow as "the best 6-5 player in America."

Hackett was drafted in 1982 by the Los Angeles Lakers with the 21st pick of the 3rd round of that year's National Basketball Association draft but was released before the season started. He also played overseas, including in the Philippines for Ginebra San Miguel of the Philippine Basketball Association.

He was among the highest scoring imports in PBA history setting a then PBA record of 103 points against Great Taste in a game on November 21, 1985. This was later broken by Tony Harris' 105 points. In that same conference, he won the PBA's Best Import of the Conference Award. The following year, he teamed up with Billy Ray Bates, forming what is considered to be the greatest import tandem in PBA history, leading Ginebra to the 1986 Open Conference title.

He was the Israeli League Top Scorer in 1991.

== See also ==
- List of basketball players who have scored 100 points in a single game
