= 1990 PBA Third Conference =

- Duration: September 30 - December 20, 1990
- TV partner(s): Vintage Sports (PTV)

Finals
- Champions: Purefoods Hotdogs
- Runners-up: Alaska Air Force

Awards
- Best Import: Bobby Parks (Formula Shell Zoom Masters)

PBA Third Conference chronology
- 1991 >

PBA conference chronology
- < 1990 All-Filipino 1991 First >

The 1990 Philippine Basketball Association (PBA) Third Conference was the third and last conference of the 1990 PBA season. It started on September 30 and ended on December 20, 1990. The tournament is a two-import format, which requires each team to have two American reinforcements.

== Format ==
The following format will be observed for the duration of the conference:

- The teams were divided into 2 groups.

Group A:

1. Shell Rimula X
2. Pepsi Hotshots
3. Presto Tivolis
4. San Miguel Beermen

Group B:

1. Alaska Air Force
2. Añejo Rum 65ers
3. Purefoods Hotdogs
4. Sarsi Sizzlers

- Teams in a group will play against each other twice and against teams in the other group once; 10 games per team; Teams are then seeded by basis on win–loss records. Ties are broken among point differentials of the tied teams. Standings will be determined in one league table; teams do not qualify by basis of groupings.
- The top five teams after the eliminations will advance to the semifinals.
- Semifinals will be two round robin affairs with the remaining teams. Results from the elimination round will be carried over. A playoff incentive for a finals berth will be given to the team that will win five of their eight semifinal games.
- The top two teams (or the top team and the winner of the playoff incentive) will face each other in a best-of-five championship series. The next two teams will qualify for a best-of-three playoff for third place.

== Elimination round ==
=== Team standings ===
Pos	Team	W	L	PCT	GB	Qualification
1	Alaska Air Force	8	2	.800	—	Semifinal round
2	Formula Shell Zoom Masters	7	3	.700	1	Semifinal round
3	Presto Tivolis	6	4	.600	2	Semifinal round
4	Purefoods Hotdogs	6	4	.600	2	Semifinal round
5	Sarsi Sizzlers	5	5	.500	3	Semifinal round
6	San Miguel Beermen	4	6	.400	4	
7	Añejo Rum 65ers	4	6	.400	4	
8	Pepsi Hotshots	0	10	.000	8	

== Semifinal round ==
=== Team standings ===
Overall standings
Pos	Team	W	L	PCT	GB	Qualification
1	Alaska Air Force	12	6	.667	—	Advance to the Finals
2	Purefoods Hotdogs	11	7	.611 (Note: Head-to-head quotient: Purefoods 1.031, Shell 0.991, Presto 0.977; second seed playoffs: Shell 137–114 Presto, Purefoods 121–101 Shell)	1	Advance to the Finals
3	Shell Rimula X	11	7	.611	1	Proceed to third place playoffs
4	Presto Tivolis	11	7	.611	1	Proceed to third place playoffs
5	Sarsi Sizzlers	7	11	.389	5	

Notes:

Semifinal round standings
Pos	Team	W	L
1	Purefoods Hotdogs	5	3
2	Presto Tivolis	5	3
3	Shell Rimula X	4	4
4	Alaska Air Force	4	4
5	Sarsi Sizzlers	2	6

== Second seed playoffs ==
Three teams finished tied for second. The three teams were ranked via head-to-head quotient, with the best performing team drawing a bye to the second round.

=== First round ===
Vintage

December 4

recap

Shell Rimula X 137, Presto Tivolis 114

The ULTRA, Pasig

=== Second round ===
Vintage

December 6

recap

Purefoods Hotdogs 121, Shell Rimula X 101

The ULTRA, Pasig

== Third place playoffs ==
Vintage

December 11

recap

Shell Rimula X 139, Presto Tivolis 123

The ULTRA, Pasig

Vintage

December 13

recap

Shell Rimula X 141, Presto Tivolis 132
Shell wins series, 2–0

The ULTRA, Pasig

== Finals ==
Vintage

December 11

Purefoods Hotdogs 103, Alaska Air Force 105

The ULTRA, Pasig

Vintage

December 13

Purefoods Hotdogs 112, Alaska Air Force 118

The ULTRA, Pasig

Vintage

December 16

Purefoods Hotdogs 117, Alaska Air Force 103

The ULTRA, Pasig

Vintage

December 18

Purefoods Hotdogs 104, Alaska Air Force 99 (OT)

The ULTRA, Pasig

Vintage

December 20

Purefoods Hotdogs 99, Alaska Air Force 98
Purefoods wins series, 3–2

The ULTRA, Pasig
