= List of TNT Tropang 5G seasons =

The TNT Tropang 5G joined the Philippine Basketball Association (PBA) in 1990 after Pepsi-Cola Products Philippines, Inc. was granted an expansion team. The team began play as the Pepsi Hotsots in the 1990 PBA season. In 1996, the team was sold to the Pilipino Telephone Corporation. Five years later, in 2001, the team came under the control of Smart Communications.

== Records per conference ==
Conference champions	Conference runners-up	Conference semifinalists

=== Three-conference era (1990–2003) ===
Season	Conference	Team name	Elimination round						Playoffs	
Season	Conference	Team name	Finish	GP	W	L	PCT	GB	Stage	Results
1990	First Conference	Pepsi Hotshots	8th/8	10	1	9	.100	7	Did not qualify	
1990	All-Filipino Cup	Pepsi Hotshots	8th/8	10	1	9	.100	9	Did not qualify	
1990	Third Conference	Pepsi Hotshots	8th/8	10	0	10	.000	8	Did not qualify	
1991	First Conference	Pepsi Hotshots	8th/8	11	4	7	.364	4	Did not qualify	
1991	All-Filipino Cup	Pepsi Hotshots	8th/8	11	3	8	.273	5	Did not qualify	
1991	Third Conference	Pepsi Hotshots	1st/8	11	8	3	.727	--	Semifinals; 3rd place playoff	3rd overall (11–8), 3–5 in semifinals San Miguel 2, Pepsi 1
1992	First Conference	Pepsi Hotshots	7th/8	11	4	7	.364	3	Did not qualify	
1992	All-Filipino Cup	7-Up Uncolas	4th/8	10	6	4	.600	2	Semifinals; Finals berth playoff 3rd-place playoff	Tied-2nd overall (12–6), 6–2 in semifinals Purefoods 81, 7-Up 77*; Swift 3, 7-Up 0
1992	Third Conference	7-Up Uncolas	2nd/8	11	7	4	.636	2	Semifinals; Finals berth playoff Finals	2nd overall (12–7), 5–3 in semifinals 7-Up 102, San Miguel 91*; Swift 4, 7-Up 0
1993	All-Filipino Cup	7-Up Uncolas	7th/8	10	3	7	.300	5	Did not qualify	
1993	Commissioner's Cup	7-Up Uncolas	7th/8	11	3	8	.273	6	Did not qualify	
1993	Governors Cup	Pepsi Mega Bottlers	4th/8	10	7	3	.700	1	Semifinals; 2nd-seed playoff 3rd-place playoff	Tied-2nd overall (11–7), 4–4 in semifinals Swift 124, Pepsi 122*; Sta. Lucia 3, Pepsi 0
1994	All-Filipino Cup	Pepsi Mega Bottlers	7th/8	10	3	7	.300	5	Did not qualify	
1994	Commissioner's Cup	Pepsi Mega Bottlers	8th/8	11	2	9	.182	7	Did not qualify	
1994	Governors Cup	Pepsi Mega Bottlers	4th/8	10	7	3	.700	1	Semifinals; 3rd-place playoff	3rd in semifinals (5–5); Pepsi 3, Purefoods 1
1995	All-Filipino Cup	Pepsi Mega Bottlers	7th/8	10	4	6	.400	3	Did not qualify	
1995	Commissioner's Cup	Pepsi Mega Bottlers	7th/8	10	1	9	.100	8	Did not qualify	
1995	Governors Cup	Pepsi Mega Bottlers	7th/8	10	2	8	.200	6	Did not qualify	
1996	All-Filipino Cup	Pepsi Mega Bottlers	8th/8	14	4	10	.286	6	Did not qualify	
1996	Commissioner's Cup	Mobiline Cellulars	8th/8	10	1	9	.100	7	Did not qualify	
1996	Governors Cup	Mobiline Cellulars	8th/8	11	2	9	.182	6	Did not qualify	
1997	All-Filipino Cup	Mobiline Cellulars	5th/8	14	7	7	.500	3	Semifinals	5th overall (9–13), 2–6 in semifinals
1997	Commissioner's Cup	Mobiline Cellulars	6th/8	10	4	6	.400	5	Did not qualify	
1997	Governors Cup	Mobiline Phone Pals	5th/8	14	7	7	.500	2	Quarterfinals	Purefoods** 93, Mobiline 81
1998	All-Filipino Cup	Mobiline Phone Pals	7th/8	11	4	7	.364	5	Did not qualify	
1998	Commissioner's Cup	Mobiline Phone Pals	6th/8	11	5	6	.455	5	Quarterfinals	San Miguel** 95, Mobiline 89
1998	Centennial Cup	Mobiline Phone Pals	2nd/9	8	5	3	.625	1	Semifinals; Finals	Mobiline 74, Pop Cola 71*; Mobiline 67, Shell 66 (OT)*
1998	Governors Cup	Mobiline Phone Pals	1st/8	(7); 15	(4); 9	(3); 6	.571.600	--	Semifinals; Finals berth playoff Finals	Tied-1st overall (12–9). 3–3 in semifinals Mobiline 84, Purefoods 80*; Shell 4, Mobiline 3
1999	All-Filipino Cup	Mobiline Phone Pals	1st/9	16	11	5	.688	--	Quarterfinals	Barangay Ginebra def. Mobiline** in 2 games
1999	Commissioner's Cup	Mobiline Phone Pals	8th/9	8	3	5	.375	3	Quarterfinals	Alaska** 88, Mobiline 77
1999	Governors Cup	Mobiline Phone Pals	7th/9	8	3	5	.375	4	Quarterfinals	Tanduay** def. Mobiline in 2 games
2000	All-Filipino Cup	Mobiline Phone Pals	7th/10	14	5	9	.357	7	Quarterfinals	San Miguel** 82, Mobiline 61
2000	Commissioner's Cup	Mobiline Phone Pals	6th/10	9	4	5	.444	3	Quarterfinals	Tanduay** 77, Mobiline 66
2000	Governors Cup	Mobiline Phone Pals	1st/10	9	7	2	.778	--	Quarterfinals; Semifinals; 3rd-place playoff	Mobiline** def. Barangay Ginebra in 2 games Purefoods 3, Mobiline 1 Red Bull def. Mobiline
2001	All-Filipino Cup	Mobiline Phone Pals	8th/10	14	6	8	.429	3	Quarterfinals	Shell** def. Mobiline in 2 games
2001	Commissioner's Cup	Mobiline Phone Pals	8th/10	9	3	6	.333	4	Quarterfinals	San Miguel** 81, Mobiline 71
2001	Governors Cup	Talk 'N Text Phone Pals	5th/10	13	7	6	.538	1	Quarterfinals	San Miguel** 77, Talk 'N Text 63
2002	Governors Cup	Talk 'N Text Phone Pals	1st/12	11	9	2	.818	--	Quarterfinals	San Miguel def. Talk 'N Text** in 2 games
2002	Commissioner's Cup	Talk 'N Text Phone Pals	7th/11	10	5	5	.500	2	Quarterfinals; Semifinals; Finals	Talk 'N Text def. Sta. Lucia** in 2 games Talk 'N Text 3, Alaska 2 Red Bull 4, Talk 'N Text 3
2002	All-Filipino Cup	Talk 'N Text Phone Pals	4th/10	9	5	4	.556	3	Quarterfinals	Alaska 82, Talk 'N Text 63*
2003	All-Filipino Cup	Talk 'N Text Phone Pals	3rd/5	18	10	8	.556	4	Quarterfinals; Semifinals; Finals	2nd in Group B (2–1); Talk 'N Text 3, Alaska 2 Talk 'N Text 4, Coca-Cola 2
2003	Invitational Cup	Talk 'N Text Phone Pals	3rd/5	4	3	1	.750	--	Did not qualify	
2003	Reinforced Conference	Talk 'N Text Phone Pals	4th/5	13	7	6	.538	4	Quarterfinals; Semifinals	Talk 'N Text 2, Red Bull 1 Coca-Cola 3, Talk 'N Text 0
Elimination/classification round				463	198	265	.428	12 semifinal appearances		
Playoffs				143	63	80	.441	5 Finals appearances		
Cumulative records				605	260	345	.430	2 championships		

=== Two-conference era (2004–2010) ===
Season	Conference	Team name	Elimination/classification round						Playoffs	
Season	Conference	Team name	Finish	GP	W	L	PCT	GB	Stage	Results
(2004)	Fiesta Conference	Talk 'N Text Phone Pals	4th/10	18	11	7	.611	5	Wildcard phase Quarterfinals; Semifinals; 3rd-place playoff	Talk 'N Text 105, FedEx 103; 1st in Group A (3–0); Barangay Ginebra 2, Talk 'N Text 1 Talk 'N Text 113, Shell 104*
2004-05	Philippine Cup	Talk 'N Text Phone Pals	2nd/10	18	12	6	.667	1	Semifinals; Finals	2nd overall (15–8), 3–2 in semifinals Barangay Ginebra 4, Talk 'N Text 2
2004-05	Fiesta Conference	Talk 'N Text Phone Pals	1st/10	18	12	6	.667	--	Semifinals; Finals	Talk 'N Text 3, Shell 1 San Miguel 4, Talk 'N Text 1
2005-06	Fiesta Conference	Talk 'N Text Phone Pals	4th/9	16	9	7	.563	1	Quarterfinals	Air21 3, Talk 'N Text 2
2005-06	Philippine Cup	Talk 'N Text Phone Pals	8th/9	16	6	10	.375	6	Wildcard phase	3rd overall (6–13), 4th in wildcards (0–3)
2006-07	Philippine Cup	Talk 'N Text Phone Pals	4th/10	18	10	8	.556	3	Quarterfinals; Semifinals; 3rd-place playoff	Talk 'N Text 3, Purefoods 1 Barangay Ginebra 4, Talk 'N Text 2 Talk 'N Text 124, Red Bull 111*
2006-07	Fiesta Conference	Talk 'N Text Phone Pals	4th/10	18	11	7	.611	2	Quarterfinals; Semifinals; Finals	Talk 'N Text 2, Air21 1 Talk 'N Text 4, Red Bull 2 Alaska 4, Talk 'N Text 3
2007-08	Philippine Cup	Talk 'N Text Phone Pals	6th/10	18	9	9	.500	3	1st wildcard round	Coca-Cola 81, Talk 'N Text 73*
2007-08	Fiesta Conference	Talk 'N Text Phone Pals	7th/10	18	9	9	.500	3	1st wildcard round 2nd wildcard round	Talk 'N Text 98, Purefoods 83*; Sta. Lucia 111, Talk 'N Text 96*
2008-09	Philippine Cup	Talk 'N Text Tropang Texters	2nd/10	18	11	7	.611	1	Semifinals; Finals	Talk 'N Text 4, San Miguel 2 Talk 'N Text 4, Alaska 3
2008-09	Fiesta Conference	Talk 'N Text Tropang Texters	7th/10	14	7	7	.500	4	Wildcard phase	Purefoods 126, Talk 'N Text 123 (2OT)*
2009-10	Philippine Cup	Talk 'N Text Tropang Texters	5th/10	18	11	7	.611	2	Quarterfinals	Barangay Ginebra 3, Talk 'N Text 2
2009-10	Fiesta Conference	Talk 'N Text Tropang Texters	1st/10	18	15	3	.833	--	Semifinals; 3rd-place playoff	Alaska 4, Talk 'N Text 3 Talk 'N Text 113, B-Meg Derby Ace 95*
Elimination/classification round				226	133	93	.588	7 semifinal appearances		
Playoffs				91	48	43	.527	4 Finals appearances		
Cumulative records				317	181	136	.571	1 championship		

*one-game playoffs

=== Three-conference era (2010–present) ===
Season	Conference	Team name	Elimination round						Playoffs	
Season	Conference	Team name	Finish	GP	W	L	PCT	GB	Stage	Results
2010-11	Philippine Cup	Talk 'N Text Tropang Texters	1st/10	14	11	3	.786	--	Quarterfinals; Semifinals; Finals	Talk 'N Text** 107, Rain or Shine 92; Talk 'N Text 4, B-Meg Derby Ace 2 Talk 'N Text 4, San Miguel 2
2010-11	Commissioner's Cup	Talk 'N Text Tropang Texters	1st/10	9	8	1	.889	--	Semifinals; Finals	Talk 'N Text 3, Air21 0 Talk 'N Text 4, Barangay Ginebra 2
2010-11	Governors Cup	Talk 'N Text Tropang Texters	1st/9	8	6	2	.750	--	Semifinals; Finals	1st overall (9–4), 3–2 in semifinals Petron 4, Talk 'N Text 3
2011-12	Philippine Cup	Talk 'N Text Tropang Texters	2nd/10	14	10	4	.714	--	Quarterfinals; Semifinals; Finals	Talk 'N Text** 81, Barako Bull 79; Talk 'N Text 4, Petron 3 Talk 'N Text 4, Powerade 1
2011-12	Commissioner's Cup	Talk 'N Text Tropang Texters	1st/10	9	7	2	.778	--	Semifinals; Finals	Talk 'N Text 3, Barako Bull 2 B-Meg 4, Talk 'N Text 3
2011-12	Governors Cup	Talk 'N Text Tropang Texters	3rd/10	9	5	4	.556	3	Semifinals	3rd overall (8–6), 3–2 in semifinals
2012-13	Philippine Cup	Talk 'N Text Tropang Texters	1st/10	14	12	2	.857	--	Quarterfinals; Semifinals; Finals	Talk 'N Text** 105, Air21 100; Talk 'N Text 4, Alaska 2 Talk 'N Text 4, Rain or Shine 0
2012-13	Commissioner's Cup	Talk 'N Text Tropang Texters	6th/10	14	7	7	.500	4	Quarterfinals; Semifinals	Talk 'N Text 2, Petron 0 Barangay Ginebra 3, Talk 'N Text 2
2012-13	Governors Cup	Talk 'N Text Tropang Texters	9th/10	9	3	6	.333	5	8th-seed playoff	Barangay Ginebra 110, Talk 'N Text 102*
2013-14	Philippine Cup	Talk 'N Text Tropang Texters	4th/10	14	8	6	.571	3	Quarterfinals	San Mig Coffee 2, Talk 'N Text 1
2013-14	Commissioner's Cup	Talk 'N Text Tropang Texters	1st/10	9	9	0	1.000	--	Quarterfinals; Semifinals; Finals	Talk 'N Text 97**, Barangay Ginebra 84; Talk 'N Text 3, Rain or Shine 0 San Mig Coffee 3, Talk 'N Text 1
2013-14	Governors Cup	Talk 'N Text Tropang Texters	1st/10	9	7	2	.778	--	Quarterfinals; Semifinals	Talk 'N Text 99**, Barako Bull 84; San Mig Coffee 3, Talk 'N Text 2
2014-15	Philippine Cup	Talk 'N Text Tropang Texters	4th/12	11	8	3	.727	1	Quarterfinals 1st phase Quarterfinals 2nd phase Semifinals	Talk 'N Text 105**, Barako Bull 76; Talk 'N Text 83, Barangay Ginebra 67*; San Miguel 4, Talk 'N Text 0
2014-15	Commissioner's Cup	Talk 'N Text Tropang Texters	2nd/12	11	8	3	.727	--	Quarterfinals; Semifinals; Finals	Talk 'N Text 127**, Barako Bull 97; Talk 'N Text 3, Purefoods 1 Talk 'N Text 4, Rain or Shine 3
2014-15	Governors Cup	Talk 'N Text Tropang Texters	10th/12	11	5	6	.455	3	Did not qualify	
2015-16	Philippine Cup	TNT Tropang Texters	6th/12	11	6	5	.545	3	Quarterfinals 1st phase Quarterfinals 2nd phase	TNT 90**, NLEX 88; Rain or Shine 104, TNT 89*
2015-16	Commissioner's Cup	Tropang TNT	6th/12	11	6	5	.545	2	Quarterfinals	Alaska 2, TNT 1
2015-16	Governors' Cup	TNT KaTropa	1st / 12	11	10	1	.909	-	Quarterfinals; Semifinals	TNT 136**, Phoenix 124; Meralco 3, TNT 1
2016-17	Philippine Cup	TNT KaTropa	4th/12	11	6	5	.545	4	Quarterfinals; Semifinals	TNT 2, GlobalPort 0 San Miguel 4, TNT 3
2016-17	Commissioner's Cup	TNT KaTropa	4th/12	11	8	3	.727	1	Quarterfinals; Semifinals; Finals	TNT 2, Meralco 1 TNT 3, Barangay Ginebra 1 San Miguel 4, TNT 2
2016-17	Governors' Cup	TNT KaTropa	2nd/12	11	8	3	.727	1	Quarterfinals; Semifinals	TNT** def. Rain or Shine in 2 games Barangay Ginebra 3, TNT 1
2017-18	Philippine Cup	TNT KaTropa	9th/12	11	5	6	.455	3	8th-seed playoff Quarterfinals	TNT 118, Phoenix 97*; San Miguel** 106, TNT 93
2017-18	Commissioner's Cup	TNT KaTropa	3rd/12	11	8	3	.727	1	Quarterfinals	San Miguel 2, TNT 0
2017-18	Governors' Cup	TNT KaTropa	9th/12	11	4	7	.364	5	Did not qualify	
2019	Philippine Cup	TNT KaTropa	4th/12	11	7	4	.636	2	Quarterfinals	San Miguel 2, TNT 1
2019	Commissioner's Cup	TNT KaTropa	1st/12	11	10	1	.909	-	Quarterfinals; Semifinals; Finals	TNT** def. Alaska in 2 games TNT 3, Barangay Ginebra 1 San Miguel 4, TNT 2
2019	Governors' Cup	TNT KaTropa	3rd/12	11	8	3	.727	-	Quarterfinals; Semifinals	TNT** 98, Magnolia 97; Meralco 3, TNT 2
2020	Philippine Cup	TNT Tropang Giga	3rd/12	11	7	4	.636	1	Quarterfinals; Semifinals; Finals	TNT** 104, Alaska 83; TNT 3, Phoenix Super LPG 2 Barangay Ginebra 4, TNT 1
2021	Philippine Cup	TNT Tropang Giga	1st/12	11	10	1	.909	-	Quarterfinals; Semifinals; Finals	TNT** 84, Barangay Ginebra 71; TNT 4, San Miguel 3 TNT 4, Magnolia 1
2021	Governors' Cup	TNT Tropang Giga	3rd/12	11	7	4	.636	2	Quarterfinals	Barangay Ginebra def. TNT** in 2 games
2022–23	Philippine Cup	TNT Tropang Giga	2nd/12	11	8	3	.727	1	Quarterfinals; Semifinals; Finals	TNT** 116, Converge 95; TNT 4, Magnolia 2 San Miguel 4, TNT 3
2022–23	Commissioner's Cup	TNT Tropang Giga	11th/13	12	4	8	.333	6	Did not qualify	
2022–23	Governors' Cup	TNT Tropang Giga	1st/12	11	10	1	.909	-	Quarterfinals; Semifinals; Finals	TNT** 132, Phoenix Super LPG 105; TNT 3, Meralco 1 TNT 4, Barangay Ginebra 2
2023–24	Commissioner's Cup	TNT Tropang Giga	8th/12	11	5	6	.455	4	Quarterfinals	Magnolia** 109, TNT 94
2023–24	Philippine Cup	TNT Tropang Giga	4th/12	11	6	5	.545	4	Quarterfinals	Rain or Shine 2, TNT 1
2024–25	Governors' Cup	TNT Tropang Giga	1st in Group A	10	8	2	.800	-	Quarterfinals; Semifinals; Finals	TNT 3, NLEX 1 TNT 4, Rain or Shine 1 TNT 4, Barangay Ginebra 2
2024–25	Commissioner's Cup	TNT Tropang Giga	2nd/13	12	8	4	.667	1	Quarterfinals; Semifinals; Finals	TNT** 109, Eastern 93; TNT 4, Rain or Shine 1 TNT 4, Barangay Ginebra 3
2024–25	Philippine Cup	TNT Tropang 5G	6th/12	11	6	5	.545	2	Quarterfinals; Semifinals; Finals	TNT def. Magnolia** in 2 games TNT 4, Rain or Shine 2 San Miguel 4, TNT 2
Elimination round				419	279	140	.666	25 Semifinals appearances		
Playoffs				286	164	122	.573	17 Finals appearances		
Cumulative records				705	443	262	.628	9 championships		

*one-game playoffs
**team had the twice-to-beat advantage

== Records per season ==
PBA season	Team season	GP	W	L	PCT	Best finish
1990	1990	30	2	28	.067	Elimination round
1991	1991	44	19	25	.432	Fourth place (Third)
1992	1992	57	29	28	.509	Runner-up (Third)
1993	1993	43	17	26	.395	Fourth place (Third)
1994	1994	45	20	25	.444	Third place (Third)
1995	1995	30	7	23	.233	Elimination round
1996	1996	35	7	28	.200	Elimination round
1997	1997	47	20	27	.426	Semifinals (all)
1998	1998	54	27	27	.500	Champions (Centennial)
1999	1999	37	18	19	.486	Quarterfinals (all)
2000	2000	41	18	23	.439	4th place (Governors')
2001	2001	40	17	23	.425	Quarterfinals (all)
2002	2002	47	27	20	.574	Runner-up (Commissioner's)
2003	2003	55	31	24	.564	Champions (All-Filipino)
2004 Fiesta	2004–05	26	17	9	.654	Third place
2004–05	2004–05	54	33	21	.611	Runner-up (all)
2005–06	2005–06	40	17	23	.425	Quarterfinals (Fiesta)
2006–07	2006–07	63	36	27	.571	Runner-up (Fiesta)
2007–08	2007–08	39	19	20	.487	2nd wildcard round (Fiesta)
2008–09	2008–09	46	26	20	.565	Champions (Philippine)
2009–10	2009–10	49	32	17	.653	Fourth place (Fiesta)
2010–11	2010–11	65	47	18	.723	Champions (Philippine & Commissioner's)
2011–12	2011–12	62	40	22	.645	Champions (Philippine)
2012–13	2012–13	56	35	21	.625	Champions (Philippine)
2013–14	2013–14	49	33	16	.673	Runner-up (Commissioner's)
2014–15	2014–15	59	35	24	.593	Champions (Commissioner's)
2015–16	2015–16	43	26	17	.605	Semifinals (Governors')
2016–17	2016–17	61	36	25	.590	Runner-up (Commissioner's)
2017–18	2017–18	37	18	19	.486	Quarterfinals (Commissioner's)
2019	2019	54	35	19	.648	Runner-up (Commissioner's)
2020	2020	22	12	10	.545	Runner-up (Philippine)
2021	2021	37	26	11	.703	Champions (Philippine)
2022–23	2022–23	59	38	21	.644	Champions (Governors')
2023–24	2023–24	26	12	14	.462	Quarterfinals (Commissioner's & Philippine)
2024–25	2024–25	75	50	25	.667	Champions (Governors' & Commissioner's)
Total		1,627	884	743	.543	

== Cumulative records ==
Era	GP	W	L	PCT
Three-conference era (1990–2003)	605	260	345	.430
Two-conference era (2004–2010)	317	181	136	.571
Three-conference era (2010–present)	705	443	262	.628
Total	1,627	884	743	.543
