= 1990 PBA First Conference =

- Duration: February 18 - May 15, 1990
- TV partner(s): Vintage Sports (PTV)

Finals
- Champions: Formula Shell Zoom Masters
- Runners-up: Añejo Rum 65ers

Awards
- Best Import: Bobby Parks (Formula Shell Zoom Masters)

PBA First Conference chronology
- 1991 >

PBA conference chronology
- < 1989 Reinforced 1990 All-Filipino >

The 1990 Philippine Basketball Association (PBA) First Conference was the opening conference of the 1990 PBA season. It started on February 18 and ended on May 15, 1990. The tournament allows one-import each per team.

== Format ==
The following format will be observed for the duration of the conference:

- The teams were divided into 2 groups.

Group A:

1. Formula Shell Zoom Masters
2. Pepsi Hotshots
3. Presto Tivolis
4. San Miguel Beermen

Group B:

1. Alaska Air Force
2. Añejo Rum 65ers
3. Purefoods Hotdogs
4. Pop Cola Sizzlers

- Teams in a group will play against each other twice and against teams in the other group once; 10 games per team; Teams are then seeded by basis on win–loss records. Ties are broken among point differentials of the tied teams. Standings will be determined in one league table; teams do not qualify by basis of groupings.
- The top five teams after the eliminations will advance to the semifinals.
- Semifinals will be two round robin affairs with the remaining teams. Results from the elimination round will be carried over. A playoff incentive for a finals berth will be given to the team that will win five of their eight semifinal games.
- The top two teams (or the top team and the winner of the playoff incentive) will face each other in a best-of-seven championship series. The next two teams will qualify for a best-of-five playoff for third place.

== Elimination round ==
=== Team standings ===
Pos	Team	W	L	PCT	GB	Qualification
1	Añejo Rum 65ers	8	2	.800	—	Semifinal round
2	Formula Shell Zoom Masters	8	2	.800	—	Semifinal round
3	Presto Tivolis	7	3	.700	1	Semifinal round
4	Alaska Air Force	6	4	.600	2	Semifinal round
5	San Miguel Beermen	5	5	.500	3	Semifinal round
6	Purefoods Hotdogs	3	7	.300	5	
7	Pop Cola Sizzlers	2	8	.200	6	
8	Pepsi Hotshots	1	9	.100	7	

== Semifinal round ==
=== Team standings ===
Overall standings
Pos	Team	W	L	PCT	GB	Qualification
1	Formula Shell Zoom Masters	14	4	.778	—	Advance to the finals
2	Añejo Rum 65ers	12	6	.667	2	Advance to the finals
3	Presto Tivolis	10	8	.556	4	Proceed to third place playoffs
4	San Miguel Beermen	9	9	.500 (Note: Head-to-head record: San Miguel 2–1 Alaska)	5	Proceed to third place playoffs
5	Alaska Air Force	9	9	.500	5	

Notes:

Semifinal round standings
Pos	Team	W	L
1	Formula Shell Zoom Masters	6	2
2	Añejo Rum 65ers	4	4
3	San Miguel Beermen	4	4
4	Presto Tivolis	3	5
5	Alaska Air Force	3	5

== Third place playoffs ==
Vintage

May 3

Presto Tivolis 101, San Miguel Beermen 102

The ULTRA, Pasig

Vintage

May 6

Presto Tivolis 114, San Miguel Beermen 127

The ULTRA, Pasig

Vintage

May 8

Presto Tivolis 106, San Miguel Beermen 97

The ULTRA, Pasig

Vintage

May 10

Presto Tivolis 105, San Miguel Beermen 111
San Miguel Beer wins series, 3–1

The ULTRA, Pasig

== Finals ==
Vintage

May 3

Formula Shell Zoom Masters 134, Añejo Rum 65ers 131

The ULTRA, Pasig

Vintage

May 6

Formula Shell Zoom Masters 127, Añejo Rum 65ers 135

The ULTRA, Pasig

Vintage

May 8

Formula Shell Zoom Masters 156, Añejo Rum 65ers 134

The ULTRA, Pasig

Vintage

May 10

Formula Shell Zoom Masters 138, Añejo Rum 65ers 135 (OT)

The ULTRA, Pasig

Vintage

May 13

Formula Shell Zoom Masters 101, Añejo Rum 65ers 130

The ULTRA, Pasig

Vintage

May 15

Formula Shell Zoom Masters 62, Añejo Rum 65ers 47 (forfeit)
Formula Shell wins series, 4–2

The ULTRA, Pasig
