= 1990 PBA All-Filipino Conference =

- Duration: June 10 – September 4, 1990
- TV partner(s): Vintage Sports (PTV)

Finals
- Champions: Presto Tivolis
- Runners-up: Purefoods Hotdogs

PBA All-Filipino Conference chronology
- < 1989 1991 >

PBA conference chronology
- < 1990 First 1990 Third >

The 1990 Philippine Basketball Association (PBA) All-Filipino Conference was the second conference of the 1990 PBA season. It started on June 10 and ended on September 4, 1990. The tournament is an All-Filipino format, which doesn't require an import or a pure-foreign player for each team.

== Format ==
The following format will be observed for the duration of the conference:

- The teams were divided into 2 groups.

Group A:

1. Formula Shell Zoom Masters
2. Pepsi Hotshots
3. Presto Tivolis
4. San Miguel Beermen

Group B:

1. Alaska Air Force
2. Añejo Rum 65ers
3. Purefoods Hotdogs
4. Pop Cola Sizzlers

- Teams in a group will play against each other twice and against teams in the other group once; 10 games per team; Teams are then seeded by basis on win–loss records. Ties are broken among point differentials of the tied teams. Standings will be determined in one league table; teams do not qualify by basis of groupings.
- The top five teams after the eliminations will advance to the semifinals.
- Semifinals will be two round robin affairs with the remaining five teams. Results from the eliminations will be carried over. A playoff incentive for a finals berth will be given to the team that will win at least five of their eight semifinal games.
- The top two teams (or the top team and the winner of the playoff incentive) will face each other in a best-of-seven championship series. The next two teams (or the loser of the playoff incentive and the fourth seeded team) dispute the third-place trophy in a best of five playoff.

== Elimination round ==
=== Team standings ===
Pos	Team	W	L	PCT	GB	Qualification
1	Presto Tivolis	10	0	1.000	—	Semifinal round
2	Purefoods Hotdogs	7	3	.700	3	Semifinal round
3	Añejo Rum 65ers	7	3	.700	3	Semifinal round
4	Alaska Air Force	6	4	.600	4	Semifinal round
5	San Miguel Beermen	5	5	.500	5	Semifinal round
6	Formula Shell Zoom Masters	3	7	.300	7	
7	Pepsi Hotshots	1	9	.100	9	
8	Pop Cola Sizzlers	1	9	.100	9	

== Semifinal round ==
=== Team standings ===
Overall standings
Pos	Team	W	L	PCT	GB	Qualification
1	Purefoods Hotdogs	13	5	.722 (Note: Head-to-head record: Purefoods 2–1 Presto)	—	Advance to the finals (Note: If a team outside the top two teams wins at least five semifinal round games, then it and the second-placed team will playoff for the last finals berth; otherwise, the top 2 teams qualify outright.)
2	Presto Tivolis	13	5	.722	—	Guaranteed finals berth playoff
3	Añejo Rum 65ers	12	6	.667	1	Proceed to third place playoffs
4	San Miguel Beermen	11	7	.611	2	Qualify to finals berth playoff
5	Alaska Air Force	6	12	.333	7	

Notes:

Semifinal round standings
Pos	Team	W	L	Qualification
1	Purefoods Hotdogs	6	2	
2	San Miguel Beermen	6	2	Qualify to finals berth playoffs (Note: Purefoods advanced to the finals outright as #1 seeded team; Añejo and San Miguel played off in the first round of the finals berth playoffs for winning at least five semifinal games and finishing outside of the top 2; finals playoffs: San Miguel 132–117 Añejo, Presto 117–115 San Miguel)
3	Añejo Rum 65ers	5	3	Qualify to finals berth playoffs
4	Presto Tivolis	3	5	
5	Alaska Air Force	0	8	

== Finals berth playoffs ==
Two teams had more than 5 wins in the semifinal round and did not finish in the top 2 places in the overall standings. Those two teams played off in the first round to determine which team will play against the second seeded team.

=== First round ===
Vintage

August 16

San Miguel Beermen 132, Añejo Rum 65ers 117

The ULTRA, Pasig

=== Second round ===
Vintage

August 19

Presto Tivolis 117, San Miguel Beermen 115

The ULTRA, Pasig

== Third place playoffs ==
Vintage

August 21

Añejo Rum 65ers 131, San Miguel Beermen 125

The ULTRA, Pasig

Vintage

August 23

Añejo Rum 65ers 125, San Miguel Beermen 146

The ULTRA, Pasig

Vintage

August 26

Añejo Rum 65ers 123, San Miguel Beermen 114

The ULTRA, Pasig

Vintage

August 28

Añejo Rum 65ers 129, San Miguel Beermen 123
Añejo Rum wins series, 3–1

The ULTRA, Pasig

== Finals ==
Vintage

August 21

Purefoods Hotdogs 95, Presto Tivolis 99

The ULTRA, Pasig

Vintage

August 23

Purefoods Hotdogs 125, Presto Tivolis 124

The ULTRA, Pasig

Vintage

August 26

Purefoods Hotdogs 111, Presto Tivolis 115

The ULTRA, Pasig

Vintage

August 28

Purefoods Hotdogs 139, Presto Tivolis 123

The ULTRA, Pasig

Vintage

August 30

Purefoods Hotdogs 119, Presto Tivolis 123

The ULTRA, Pasig

Vintage

September 2

Purefoods Hotdogs 128, Presto Tivolis 117

The ULTRA, Pasig

Vintage

September 4

Purefoods Hotdogs 96, Presto Tivolis 115
Presto Tivoli wins series, 4–3

The ULTRA, Pasig
