= List of Barangay Ginebra San Miguel seasons =

The Barangay Ginebra San Miguel, owned by Ginebra San Miguel, joined the Philippine Basketball Association (PBA) in 1979. The team began play as Gilbey's Gin in the 1979 PBA season.

== Records per conference ==
Conference champions	Conference runners-up	Conference third-place/semifinalists

=== Three-conference era (1979–2003) ===
Season	Conference	Team name	Elimination/classification round						Playoffs	
Season	Conference	Team name	Finish	GP	W	L	PCT	GB	Stage	Results
1979	All-Filipino	Gilbey's Gin		44	13	31	.295			
1979	Open	Gilbey's Gin		44	13	31	.295			
1979	Invitational	Gilbey's Gin		44	13	31	.295			
1980	Open	Gilbey's Gin		39	16	23	.410			
1980	Invitational	Gilbey's Gin		39	16	23	.410			
1980	All-Filipino	Gilbey's Gin		39	16	23	.410			
1981	Open	Gilbey's Gin		30	8	22	.267			
1981	Reinforced Filipino	St. George Whiskies		30	8	22	.267			
1982	Reinforced Filipino	Gilbey's Gin	2nd/4 (Group A)	18	11	7	.611	1	Quarterfinals	U/Tex 2, Gilbey's Gin 0
1982	Invitational	Gilbey's Gin	Did not qualify							
1982	Open	Gilbey's Gin	2nd/4 (Group A)	18	13	5	.722	–	Semifinals; Finals	1st in semifinals (4–2); Toyota 3, Gilbey's Gin 0
1983	All-Filipino	Gilbey's Gin	3rd/8	7	4	3	.571	2	Semifinals; Finals	2nd in semifinals (2–1); Crispa 3, Gilbey's Gin 0
1983	Reinforced Filipino	Gilbey's Gin Gimlets	5th/8	14	7	7	.500	4	Quarterfinals; Semifinals; Finals berth playoff 3rd-place playoff	1st in quarterfinals (3–0); 3rd in semifinals (4–2); Great Taste 129, Gilbey's Gin 123*; Tanduay 3, Gilbey's Gin 1
1983	Open	Gilbey's Gin Tonics	5th/8	14	7	7	.500	2	Quarterfinals; Semifinals; Finals berth playoff 3rd-place playoff	1st in quarterfinals (2–1); 4th in semifinals (3–3); Great Taste 126, Gilbey's Gin 118*; San Miguel 2, Gilbey's Gin 1
1984	First All-Filipino	Gilbey's Gin Tonics	5th/8	14	8	6	.571	3	Quarterfinals; Semifinals; Finals berth playoff Finals	2nd in quarterfinals (2–1); 2nd in semifinals (3–3); Gilbey's Gin 115, Beer Hausen 109*; Crispa 4, Gilbey's Gin 1
1984	Second All-Filipino	Gilbey's Gin Tonics	4th/8	11	6	5	.545	3	Quarterfinals	Tanduay 2, Gilbey's Gin 1
1984	Invitational	Gilbey's Gin Tonics	4th/5	8	2	6	.250	5	3rd-place playoff	Beer Hausen 3, Gilbey's Gin 1
1985	Open	Ginebra San Miguel	7th/7	12	3	9	.250	5	Did not qualify	
1985	All-Filipino	Ginebra San Miguel	4th/6	10	5	5	.500	3	Semifinals; Finals berth playoff 3rd-place playoff	3rd overall (8–8), 3–3 in semifinals Shell 89, Ginebra 76*; Tanduay 2, Ginebra 2 (Tanduay clinch third by higher quotient)
1985	Reinforced	Ginebra San Miguel	2nd/7	12	7	5	.583	2	Seeding playoff Seeding playoff Semifinals; 3rd-place playoff	Ginebra 99, Northern Cement 96*; Ginebra 106, Magnolia 98*; 4th in semifinals (2–4); Ginebra 4, Great Taste 0
1986	Reinforced	Ginebra San Miguel	4th/6	10	5	5	.500	3	Semifinals; 3rd-place playoff	3rd overall (11–7), 6–2 in semifinals Ginebra 4, Alaska 2
1986	All-Filipino	Ginebra San Miguel	5th/7	6	2	4	.333	3	Quarterfinals; Semifinals; Finals	1st overall (5–4), 3–0 in quarterfinals 2nd in semifinals (4–2); Tanduay 3, Ginebra 1
1986	Open	Ginebra San Miguel	1st/7	12	9	3	.750	–	Semifinals; Finals	1st in semifinals (4–1); Ginebra 4, Manila Beer 1
1987	Open	Ginebra San Miguel	4th/7	12	6	6	.500	4	Quarterfinals; Semifinals; 3rd-place playoff	2nd overall (9–6), 3–0 in quarterfinals 4th in semifinals (2–4); Magnolia 4, Ginebra 1
1987	All-Filipino	Ginebra San Miguel	5th/6	8	4	4	.500	1	Semifinals; 3rd-place playoff	4th in semifinals (3–5); Magnolia 3, Ginebra 0
1987	Reinforced	Ginebra San Miguel	4th/6	10	5	5	.500	2	Semifinals; Finals berth playoff 3rd-place playoff	2nd overall (10–8), 4–4 in semifinals Hills Bros. 89, Ginebra 87*; Ginebra 4, Shell 0
1988	Open	Ginebra San Miguel	2nd/6	10	6	4	.600	1	Semifinals; 3rd-place playoff	3rd overall (10–8), 4–4 in semifinals Alaska 3, Ginebra 2
1988	All-Filipino	Añejo Rum 65ers	4th/7	12	7	5	.583	1	Semifinals; Finals berth playoff Finals	2nd overall (12–8), 5–3 in semifinals Añejo 102, San Miguel 100*; Añejo 3, Purefoods 1
1988	Reinforced	Añejo Rum 65ers	5th/6	10	5	5	.500	2	Semifinals; 3rd-place playoff	4th overall (9–9), 4–4 in semifinals Añejo 3, Presto 1
1989	Open	Añejo Rum 65ers	6th/6	10	3	7	.300	7	Elimination playoff	Alaska 133, Añejo 120*
1989	All-Filipino	Añejo Rum 65ers	4th/6	11	6	5	.545	3	Semifinals; 3rd-place playoff	4th overall (10–9), 4–4 in semifinals Shell 3, Añejo 2
1989	Reinforced	Añejo Rum 65ers	4th/6	10	5	5	.500	1	Semifinals; Finals berth playoff Finals	2nd overall (10–8), 5–3 in semifinals Añejo 113, Purefoods 112*; San Miguel 4, Añejo 1
1990	First Conf.	Añejo Rum 65ers	1st/8	10	8	2	.800	–	Semifinals; Finals	3rd overall (12–6), 4–4 in semifinals Shell 4, Añejo 2
1990	All-Filipino	Añejo Rum 65ers	3rd/8	10	7	3	.700	3	Semifinals; Incentive playoff 3rd-place playoff	3rd overall (12–6), 5–3 in semifinals San Miguel 132, Añejo 117*; Añejo 3, San Miguel 1
1990	Third Conf.	Añejo Rum 65ers	7th/8	10	4	6	.400	4	Did not qualify	
1991	First Conf.	Ginebra San Miguel	5th/8	11	5	6	.455	3	Semifinals; Finals	2nd overall (12–7), 7–1 in semifinals Ginebra 4, Shell 3
1991	All-Filipino	Ginebra San Miguel	6th/8	11	4	7	.364	4	Did not qualify	
1991	Third Conf.	Ginebra San Miguel	3rd/8	11	7	4	.636	1	Semifinals; Finals	2nd overall (12–7), 5–3 in semifinals Alaska 3, Ginebra 1
1992	First Conf.	Ginebra San Miguel	8th/8	11	3	8	.273	4	Did not qualify	
1992	All-Filipino	Ginebra San Miguel	6th/8	10	3	7	.300	5	Did not qualify	
1992	Third Conf.	Ginebra San Miguel	3rd/8	11	7	4	.636	2	Semifinals; 3rd-place playoff	4th overall (10–9), 3–5 in semifinals Ginebra 3, San Miguel 0
1993	All-Filipino	Ginebra San Miguel	5th/8	10	5	5	.500	3	Quarterfinals	5th overall (5–9), 0–4 in quarterfinals
1993	Commissioner's	Ginebra San Miguel	6th/8	11	3	8	.273	6	Did not qualify	
1993	Governors'	Ginebra San Miguel	8th/8	10	1	9	.100	7	Did not qualify	
1994	All-Filipino	Tondeña 65 Rum Masters	8th/8	10	2	8	.200	6	Did not qualify	
1994	Commissioner's	Tondeña 65 Rum Masters	6th/8	11	5	6	.455	4	Did not qualify	
1994	Governors'	Tondeña 65 Rum Masters	5th/8	10	5	5	.500	2	Elimination playoff	Shell 125, Tondeña 123*
1995	All-Filipino	Ginebra San Miguel	8th/8	10	4	6	.400	3	Did not qualify	
1995	Commissioner's	Ginebra San Miguel	8th/8	10	1	9	.100	8	Did not qualify	
1995	Governors'	Ginebra San Miguel	8th/8	10	0	10	.000	8	Did not qualify	
1996	All-Filipino	Ginebra San Miguel	5th/8	14	7	7	.500	3	Semifinals; Finals berth playoff 3rd-place playoff	3rd overall (12–10), 5–3 in semifinals Alaska 96, Ginebra 83; San Miguel 100, Ginebra 99*
1996	Commissioner's	Ginebra San Miguel	3rd/8	10	6	4	.600	2	Semifinals; Finals berth playoff 3rd-place playoff	2nd overall (12–6), 6–2 in semifinals Shell 89, Ginebra 86*; Sta. Lucia 111, Ginebra 106*
1996	Governors'	Ginebra San Miguel	2nd/8	11	7	4	.636	1	Semifinals; Finals	Ginebra 3, San Miguel 1 Alaska 4, Ginebra 1
1997	All-Filipino	Gordon's Gin Boars	1st/8	14	10	4	.714	–	Semifinals; Finals	1st overall (14–8), 4–4 in semifinals Purefoods 4, Gordon's Gin 2
1997	Commissioner's	Gordon's Gin Boars	1st/8	10	6	4	.600	–	Semifinals; Finals berth playoff Finals	3rd overall (11–7), 5–3 in semifinals Gordon's Gin 106, San Miguel 100; Gordon's Gin 4, Alaska 2
1997	Governors'	Gordon's Gin Boars	6th/8	14	7	7	.500	2	Quarterfinals	Sta. Lucia** 102, Gordon's Gin 93
1998	All-Filipino	Gordon's Gin Boars	6th/8	11	5	6	.455	4	Semifinals	6th overall (7–14), 2–8 in semifinals
1998	Commissioner's	Gordon's Gin Boars	8th/8	11	4	7	.364	6	Did not qualify	
1998	Centennial	Ginebra San Miguel	1st/9	8	6	2	.750	–	Semifinals; 3rd-place playoff	Shell 78, Ginebra 75*; Pop Cola 85, Ginebra 71*
1998	Governors'	Ginebra San Miguel	6th/8	(7); 15	(1); 7	(6); 8	.143.467	2	(Records carried over from Centennial Cup); Did not qualify	
1999	All-Filipino	Barangay Ginebra Kings	8th/9	16	6	10	.375	5	8th-seed playoff Quarterfinals; Semifinals; 3rd-place playoff	Barangay Ginebra 77, Sta. Lucia 74*; Barangay Ginebra def. Mobiline** in 2 games Shell 3, Barangay Ginebra 0 Barangay Ginebra 95, Alaska 73*
1999	Commissioner's	Barangay Ginebra Kings	6th/9	8	3	5	.375	3	Quarterfinals	Sta. Lucia** 96, Barangay Ginebra 75
1999	Governors'	Barangay Ginebra Kings	8th/9	8	1	7	.125	6	Quarterfinals	Purefoods** 80. Barangay Ginebra 74
2000	All-Filipino	Barangay Ginebra Kings	8th/10	14	5	9	.357	7	8th-seed playoff Quarterfinals	Barangay Ginebra 71, Shell 68*; Tanduay** 101, Barangay Ginebra 78
2000	Commissioner's	Barangay Ginebra Kings	8th/10	9	4	5	.444	3	Quarterfinals	San Miguel** 90, Barangay Ginebra 89
2000	Governors'	Barangay Ginebra Kings	8th/10	9	4	5	.444	3	Quarterfinals	Mobiline** def. Barangay Ginebra in 2 games
2001	All-Filipino	Barangay Ginebra Kings	5th/10	14	7	7	.500	2	Quarterfinals; Semifinals; Finals	Barangay Ginebra def. Purefoods** in 2 games Barangay Ginebra 3, Shell 2 San Miguel 4, Barangay Ginebra 2
2001	Commissioner's	Barangay Ginebra Kings	6th/10	9	4	5	.444	3	Quarterfinals	Red Bull** 82, Barangay Ginebra 70
2001	Governors'	Barangay Ginebra Kings	8th/10	13	6	7	.462	2	Quarterfinals	Shell** def. Barangay Ginebra in 2 games
2002	Governors'	Barangay Ginebra Kings	11th/12	11	3	8	.273	6	Did not qualify	
2002	Commissioner's	Barangay Ginebra Kings	11th/11	10	2	8	.200	5	Did not qualify	
2002	All-Filipino	Barangay Ginebra Kings	9th/10	9	3	6	.333	5	Did not qualify	
2003	All-Filipino	Barangay Ginebra Kings	4th/5 (Group B)	18	6	12	.333	8	Quarterfinals	0–3 in Group A
2003	Invitational	Barangay Ginebra Kings	2nd/5	4	2	2	.500	2	Did not qualify	
2003	Reinforced	Barangay Ginebra Kings	3rd/5 (Group B)	13	7	6	.538	4	Quarterfinals	Coca-Cola 2, Barangay Ginebra 1
Elimination round (1986–2003)				585	272	313	.465	—	25 Semifinals appearances	
1979–85 totals and 1986–2003 playoffs				654	303	351	.463	—	9 Finals appearances	
Cumulative totals				1,239	575	664	.464	—	4 Championships	

*One-game playoff
**Team had twice-to-beat advantage

=== Two-conference era (2004–2010) ===
Season	Conference	Team name	Elimination/classification round						Playoffs	
Season	Conference	Team name	Finish	GP	W	L	PCT	GB	Stage	Results
(2004)	Fiesta	Barangay Ginebra Kings	7th/10	18	7	11	.389	9	Wildcard phase Quarterfinals; Semifinals; Finals	Barangay Ginebra 108, Sta. Lucia 105*; 2nd in Group B (2–1); Barangay Ginebra 2, Talk 'N Text 1 Barangay Ginebra 3, Red Bull 1
2004-05	Philippine	Barangay Ginebra Kings	1st/10	18	13	5	.722	–	Semifinals; Finals	1st overall (17-6), 4-1 in semifinals Barangay Ginebra 4, Talk 'N Text 2
2004-05	Fiesta	Barangay Ginebra Kings	7th/10	18	8	10	.444	4	Wildcard phase	Red Bull 2, Barangay Ginebra 0
2005-06	Fiesta	Barangay Ginebra Kings	2nd/9	16	9	7	.563	1	2nd-seed playoff Semifinals; 3rd-place playoff	Barangay Ginebra 109, Red Bull 102*; Red Bull 4, Barangay Ginebra 3 Air21 108, Barangay Ginebra 98*
2005-06	Philippine	Barangay Ginebra Kings	7th/9	16	7	9	.438	5	Wildcard phase Quarterfinals	1st overall (10–9), 1st in wildcards (3–0); Red Bull 3, Barangay Ginebra 2
2006-07	Philippine	Barangay Ginebra Kings	1st/10	18	13	5	.722	–	Semifinals; Finals	Barangay Ginebra 4, Talk 'N Text 2 Barangay Ginebra 4, San Miguel 2
2006-07	Fiesta	Barangay Ginebra Kings	3rd/10	18	12	6	.667	1	2nd-seed playoff Quarterfinals	Alaska 103, Barangay Ginebra 95*; San Miguel 2, Barangay Ginebra 1
2007-08	Philippine	Barangay Ginebra Kings	7th/10	18	8	10	.444	4	1st wildcard round	Air21 119, Barangay Ginebra 110*
2007-08	Fiesta	Barangay Ginebra Kings	3rd/10	18	10	8	.556	2	Quarterfinals; Semifinals; Finals	Barangay Ginebra 2, Sta. Lucia 0 Barangay Ginebra 4, Red Bull 0 Barangay Ginebra 4, Air21 3
2008-09	Philippine	Barangay Ginebra Kings	3rd/10	18	10	8	.556	2	Quarterfinals	San Miguel 2, Barangay Ginebra 1
2008-09	Fiesta	Barangay Ginebra Kings	2nd/10	14	8	6	.571	3	2nd-seed playoff Semifinals; Finals	Barangay Ginebra 114, Rain or Shine 71*; Barangay Ginebra 4, Rain or Shine 2 San Miguel 4, Barangay Ginebra 3
2009-10	Philippine	Barangay Ginebra Kings	4th/10	18	12	6	.667	1	Quarterfinals; Semifinals; 3rd-place playoff	Barangay Ginebra 3, Talk 'N Text 2 Alaska 4, Barangay Ginebra 0 San Miguel 95, Barangay Ginebra 88*
2009-10	Fiesta	Barangay Ginebra Kings	5th/10	18	9	9	.500	6	5th-seed playoff Quarterfinals	Barangay Ginebra 115, Rain or Shine 88*; Alaska 3, Barangay Ginebra 2
Elimination/classification round				226	126	100	.558	—	7 Semifinals appearances	
Playoffs				104	58	46	.558	—	5 Finals appearances	
Cumulative totals				330	184	146	.558	—	4 Championships	

*one-game playoffs

=== Three-conference era (2010–present) ===
Season	Conference	Team name	Elimination round						Playoffs	
Season	Conference	Team name	Finish	GP	W	L	PCT	GB	Stage	Results
2010-11	Philippine	Barangay Ginebra Kings	3rd/10	14	10	4	.714	1	Quarterfinals; Semifinals	Barangay Ginebra 2, Alaska 1 San Miguel 4, Barangay Ginebra 2
2010-11	Commissioner's	Barangay Ginebra Kings	3rd/10	9	5	4	.556	3	Quarterfinals; Semifinals; Finals	Barangay Ginebra 2, Rain or Shine 1 Barangay Ginebra 3, Smart Gilas 1 Talk 'N Text 4, Barangay Ginebra 2
2010-11	Governors'	Barangay Ginebra Kings	4th/9	8	5	3	.625	1	Semifinals	4th overall (8–5), 3–2 in semifinals
2011-12	Philippine	Barangay Ginebra Kings	4th/10	14	9	5	.643	1	Quarterfinals	Rain or Shine 2, Barangay Ginebra 0
2011-12	Commissioner's	Barangay Ginebra Kings	2nd/10	9	6	3	.667	1	2nd-seed playoff Semifinals	Barangay Ginebra 93, B-Meg 84*; B-Meg 3, Barangay Ginebra 1
2011-12	Governors'	Barangay Ginebra Kings	4th/10	9	5	4	.556	3	Semifinals; Finals berth playoff	T-2nd overall (9–5), 4–1 in semifinals B-Meg 74, Barangay Ginebra 72*
2012-13	Philippine	Barangay Ginebra San Miguel	6th/10	14	7	7	.500	5	Quarterfinals	Rain or Shine 2, Barangay Ginebra 1
2012-13	Commissioner's	Barangay Ginebra San Miguel	7th/10	14	7	7	.500	4	Quarterfinals; Semifinals; Finals	Barangay Ginebra def. Rain or Shine** in 2 games Barangay Ginebra 3, Talk 'N Text 2 Alaska 3, Barangay Ginebra 0
2012-13	Governors'	Barangay Ginebra San Miguel	9th/10	9	3	6	.333	5	8th-seed playoff Quarterfinals	Barangay Ginebra 110, Talk 'N Text 102*; Petron** 101, Barangay Ginebra 94
2013-14	Philippine	Barangay Ginebra San Miguel	1st/10	14	11	3	.786	–	Quarterfinals; Semifinals	Barangay Ginebra** def. Alaska in 2 games San Mig Super Coffee 4, Barangay Ginebra 3
2013-14	Commissioner's	Barangay Ginebra San Miguel	8th/10	9	3	6	.333	6	Quarterfinals	Talk 'N Text** 97, Barangay Ginebra 84
2013-14	Governors'	Barangay Ginebra San Miguel	6th/10	9	5	4	.556	2	Quarterfinals	Alaska** 92, Barangay Ginebra 81
2014–15	Philippine	Barangay Ginebra San Miguel	5th/12	11	6	5	.545	3	Quarterfinals; 2 phases	1st: Barangay Ginebra** 95, GlobalPort 78; 2nd: Talk 'N Text 83, Barangay Ginebra 67*
2014–15	Commissioner's	Barangay Ginebra San Miguel	8th/12	11	5	6	.455	3	Quarterfinals	Rain or Shine** 92, Barangay Ginebra 91
2014–15	Governors'	Barangay Ginebra San Miguel	8th/12	11	5	6	.455	3	Quarterfinals	Alaska** 114, Barangay Ginebra 108
2015-16	Philippine	Barangay Ginebra San Miguel	4th/12	11	7	4	.636	2	Quarterfinals; 2 Phases	1st: Barangay Ginebra** 92, Star 89; 2nd: GlobalPort 84, Barangay Ginebra 83*
2015-16	Commissioner's	Barangay Ginebra San Miguel	4th/12	11	7	4	.636	1	Quarterfinals	Rain or Shine 2, Barangay Ginebra 0
2015-16	Governors'	Barangay Ginebra San Miguel	3rd/12	11	8	3	.727	2	Quarterfinals; Semifinals; Finals	Barangay Ginebra** 109, Alaska 104; Barangay Ginebra 3, San Miguel 2 Barangay Ginebra 4, Meralco 2
2016-17	Philippine	Barangay Ginebra San Miguel	7th/12	11	6	5	.545	4	Quarterfinals; Semifinals; Finals	Barangay Ginebra def. Alaska** in 2 games Barangay Ginebra 4, Star 3 San Miguel 4, Barangay Ginebra 1
2016-17	Commissioner's	Barangay Ginebra San Miguel	1st/12	11	9	2	.818	–	Quarterfinals; Semifinals	Barangay Ginebra** 96, GlobalPort 85; TNT 3, Barangay Ginebra 1
2016-17	Governors'	Barangay Ginebra San Miguel	3rd/12	11	8	3	.727	1	Quarterfinals; Semifinals; Finals	Barangay Ginebra** 104, San Miguel 84; Barangay Ginebra 3, TNT 1 Barangay Ginebra 4, Meralco 3
2017-18	Philippine	Barangay Ginebra San Miguel	4th/12	11	6	5	.545	2	Quarterfinals; Semifinals	Barangay Ginebra 2, Rain or Shine 0 San Miguel 4, Barangay Ginebra 1
2017-18	Commissioner's	Barangay Ginebra San Miguel	5th/12	11	6	5	.545	3	Quarterfinals; Semifinals; Finals	Barangay Ginebra 2, Meralco 0 Barangay Ginebra 3, Rain or Shine 1 Barangay Ginebra 4, San Miguel 2
2017-18	Governors'	Barangay Ginebra San Miguel	1st/12	11	9	2	.818	–	Quarterfinals; Semifinals	Barangay Ginebra** 111, NLEX 75; Magnolia 3, Barangay Ginebra 1
2019	Philippine	Barangay Ginebra San Miguel	3rd/12	11	7	4	.636	2	Quarterfinals	Magnolia 2, Barangay Ginebra 1
2019	Commissioner's	Barangay Ginebra San Miguel	4th/12	11	7	4	.636	3	Quarterfinals; Semifinals	Barangay Ginebra 2, Magnolia 0 TNT 3, Barangay Ginebra 1
2019	Governors'	Barangay Ginebra San Miguel	4th/12	11	7	4	.636	1	Quarterfinals; Semifinals; Finals	Barangay Ginebra** 100, San Miguel 97; Barangay Ginebra 3, NorthPort 1 Barangay Ginebra 4, Meralco 1
2020	Philippine	Barangay Ginebra San Miguel	1st/12	11	8	3	.727	–	Quarterfinals; Semifinals; Finals	Barangay Ginebra** 81, Rain or Shine 73; Barangay Ginebra 3, Meralco 2 Barangay Ginebra 4, TNT 1
2021	Philippine	Barangay Ginebra San Miguel	8th/12	11	4	7	.364	6	8th-seed playoff Quarterfinals	Barangay Ginebra 95, Phoenix Super LPG 85; TNT** 84, Barangay Ginebra 71
2021	Governors'	Barangay Ginebra San Miguel	6th/12	11	6	5	.545	3	Quarterfinals; Semifinals; Finals	Barangay Ginebra def. TNT** in 2 games Barangay Ginebra 3, NLEX 1 Barangay Ginebra 4, Meralco 2
2022–23	Philippine	Barangay Ginebra San Miguel	4th/12	11	8	3	.727	1	Quarterfinals	Meralco 2, Barangay Ginebra 1
2022–23	Commissioner's	Barangay Ginebra San Miguel	3rd/13	12	9	3	.750	1	Quarterfinals; Semifinals; Finals	Barangay Ginebra 2, NorthPort 0 Barangay Ginebra 3, Magnolia 1 Barangay Ginebra 4, Bay Area 3
2022–23	Governors'	Barangay Ginebra San Miguel	3rd/12	11	8	3	.727	2	Quarterfinals; Semifinals; Finals	Barangay Ginebra** 127, NLEX 93; Barangay Ginebra 3, San Miguel 0 TNT 4, Barangay Ginebra 2
2023–24	Commissioner's	Barangay Ginebra San Miguel	3rd/12	11	8	3	.727	1	Quarterfinals; Semifinals	Barangay Ginebra** 106, NorthPort 93; San Miguel 3, Barangay Ginebra 0
2023–24	Philippine	Barangay Ginebra San Miguel	2nd/12	11	7	4	.636	3	Quarterfinals; Semifinals	Barangay Ginebra** 99, Magnolia 77; Meralco 4, Barangay Ginebra 3
2024–25	Governors'	Barangay Ginebra San Miguel	3rd in Group B	10	6	4	.600	1	Quarterfinals; Semifinals; Finals	Barangay Ginebra 3, Meralco 0 Barangay Ginebra 4, San Miguel 2 TNT 4, Barangay Ginebra 2
2024–25	Commissioner's	Barangay Ginebra San Miguel	4th/13	12	8	4	.667	1	Quarterfinals; Semifinals; Finals	Barangay Ginebra 2, Meralco 1 Barangay Ginebra 4, NorthPort 1 TNT 4, Barangay Ginebra 3
2024–25	Philippine	Barangay Ginebra San Miguel	4th/12	11	8	3	.727	–	Quarterfinals; Semifinals	Barangay Ginebra** 88, Converge 80; San Miguel 4, Barangay Ginebra 3
Elimination round				419	259	160	.618	—	25 Semifinals appearances	
Playoffs				262	145	117	.553	—	13 Finals appearances	
Cumulative records				681	404	277	.593	—	7 Championships	

*one-game playoffs
**team had the twice-to-beat advantage

== Records per season ==
PBA season	Team season	GP	W	L	PCT	Best finish
1979	1979	44	13	31	.295	Quarterfinals
1980	1980	39	16	23	.410	Semifinals
1981	1981	30	8	22	.267	Elimination round
1982	1982	47	28	19	.596	Finals
1983	1983	68	34	34	.500	Finals
1984	1984	55	25	30	.455	Finals
1985	1985	57	28	29	.491	Semifinals
1986	1986	65	42	23	.646	Champions
1987	1987	68	33	35	.485	Semifinals
1988	1988	70	40	30	.571	Champions
1989	1989	59	27	32	.458	Finals
1990	1989	57	33	24	.579	Finals
1991	1991	60	33	27	.550	Champions
1992	1992	43	19	24	.442	Semifinals
1993	1993	35	9	26	.257	Quarterfinals
1994	1994	32	12	20	.375	Elimination round
1995	1995	30	5	25	.167	Elimination round
1996	1996	64	35	29	.547	Finals
1997	1997	68	39	29	.574	Champions
1998	1998	49	18	31	.367	Semifinals
1999	1999	42	15	27	.357	Semifinals
2000	2000	37	15	22	.405	Quarterfinals
2001	2001	52	25	27	.481	Finals
2002	2002	30	8	22	.267	Elimination round
2003	2003	41	16	25	.390	Quarterfinals
2004 Fiesta	2004–05	29	15	14	.517	Champions
2004–05	2004–05	49	28	21	.571	Champions
2005–06	2005–06	49	25	24	.510	Semifinals
2006–07	2006–07	52	34	18	.654	Champions
2007–08	2007–08	50	28	22	.560	Champions
2008–09	2008–09	49	27	22	.551	Finals
2009–10	2009–10	52	27	25	.519	Semifinals
2010–11	2010–11	58	34	24	.586	Finals
2011–12	2011–12	45	26	19	.578	Semifinals
2012–13	2012–13	52	24	28	.462	Finals
2013–14	2013–14	43	23	20	.535	Semifinals
2014–15	2014–15	37	17	20	.459	Quarterfinals
2015–16	2015–16	49	31	18	.633	Champions
2016–17	2016–17	64	40	24	.625	Champions
2017–18	2017–18	57	35	22	.614	Champions
2019	2019	52	33	19	.635	Champions
2020	2020	22	16	6	.727	Champions
2021	2021	36	20	16	.556	Champions
2022–23	2022–23	60	41	19	.683	Champions
2023–24	2023–24	34	20	14	.588	Semifinals
2024–25	2024–25	71	44	27	.620	Finals
Total		2,250	1,163	1,087	.517	

== Cumulative records ==
Era	GP	W	L	PCT
Three-conference era (1979–2003)	1,239	575	664	.464
Two-conference era (2004–2010)	330	184	146	.558
Three-conference era (2010–present)	681	404	277	.593
Total	2,250	1,163	1,087	.517
