= 1980 Gilbey's Gin season =

- Head coach: Filomeno Pumaren; Nemie Villegas

Open Conference results
- Record: 7–11 (38.9%)
- Place: 7th
- Playoff finish: N/A

Invitational Championship results
- Record: 0–0
- Place: N/A
- Playoff finish: N/A

All Filipino Conference results
- Record: 9–12 (42.9%)
- Place: 4th
- Playoff finish: Semifinals

Gilbey's Gin seasons

The 1980 Gilbey's Gin season was the 2nd season of the franchise in the Philippine Basketball Association (PBA).

== Transactions ==
ADDITIONS
Wilfredo Generalao ^{Rookie signed}
Orlando Delos Santos ^{Acquired from defunct Filmanbank}
Wilfredo Tanduyan and Armando Torres ^{Acquired from Crispa}
Marlowe Jacutin ^{Acquired from Royal}

== Win–loss record vs opponents ==
Teams	Win	Loss	1st (Open)	3rd (All-Filipino)
Galleon Shippers	2	1	1-1	1-0
Great Taste / Presto	2	1	1-1	1-0
Honda	2	1	2-0	0-1
Royal / San Miguel	2	2	1-1	1-1
Tanduay	4	5	2-0	2-5
Tefilin	1	2	0-2	1-0
Toyota Tamaraws	1	4	0-2	1-2
U-Tex Wranglers	2	2	0-2	2-0
Walk Tall / Crispa	0	5	0-2	0-3
Total	16	23	7-11	9-12

== Semifinal stint ==
Coach Pilo Pumaren was replaced by Nemie Villegas as the team's head coach in the season-ending All-Filipino Conference. Gilbey's posted a 5-4 and 3-2 won-loss cards in the elimination and quarterfinal phase and they made it to the four-team semifinals for the first time in five conferences. The Gins didn't win any match in the single round-robin and they placed fourth by losing to Tanduay in four games of their best-of-five series for third place.

== Awards ==
Willie Generalao was named the season's Rookie of the year

== Roster ==
1980 Gilbey's Gin roster
Players

Pos.	#	POB	Name	Height	Weight	DOB (YYYY–MM–DD)	From
G		(Philippines)	Orlando Delos Santos	5 ft 8 in (1.73 m)			Philippines
F	3	(Philippines)	Norberto Rivera	5 ft 11 in (1.80 m)			San Sebastian
G	5	(Philippines)	Bienvenido Dela Cruz	5 ft 11 in (1.80 m)			Mindanao
G	7	(Philippines)	Armando Torres	6 ft 1 in (1.85 m)			FEATI
F	8	(Philippines)	Marlowe Jacutin	6 ft 0 in (1.83 m)			Visayas
F/C	10	(Philippines)	Jesusito Martin	6 ft 3 in (1.91 m)			JRC
F	16	(Philippines)	Porfirio Rodriguez	6 ft 3 in (1.91 m)
F/C	18	(Philippines)	Eusebio Del Rosario	6 ft 2 in (1.88 m)			UE
G	19	(Philippines)	Wilfredo Tanduyan	5 ft 10 in (1.78 m)			Southwestern-U
G	21	(Philippines)	Lucrecio Dator	5 ft 11 in (1.80 m)			Southwestern-U
G	24	(Philippines)	Wilfredo Generalao	5 ft 8 in (1.73 m)			Visayas
G	30	(Philippines)	Javier Garcia	5 ft 9 in (1.75 m)			Adamson
C	31	(United States)	Larry McNeill (I)	6 ft 9 in (2.06 m)			Marquette
F/C	34	(United States)	Jim Bradley (I)	6 ft 8 in (2.03 m)			Northern Illinois

Coaches

Head coach

- (Philippines) Filomeno Pumaren
- (Philippines) Nemie Villegas

Assistant coach(es)

Legend

- (C) Team captain
- (I) Import
- Injured
