= 1990 San Miguel Beermen season =

- Head coach: Norman Black
- General manager: Eddie Veneracion
- Owner: San Miguel Corporation

First Conference results
- Record: 12–10 (54.5%)
- Place: 3rd
- Playoff finish: Semifinals

All-Filipino Conference results
- Record: 13–11 (54.2%)
- Place: 4th
- Playoff finish: Semifinals

Third Conference results
- Record: 4–6 (40%)
- Place: 7th
- Playoff finish: Eliminated

San Miguel Beermen seasons

The 1990 San Miguel Beermen season was the 16th season of the franchise in the Philippine Basketball Association (PBA).

== Draft picks ==
Round	Pick	Player	Details
1	8	Edgardo Postanes	Signed
2	16	Romeo Lopez	Unsigned, free agent
3	22	Josel Angeles	Signed

== Notable dates ==
February 22: The Grandslam champions San Miguel Beermen scored their second win without a loss by turning back Pop Cola, 113–108.

July 26: Ato Agustin wriggled his way in for a twinner with nine seconds left, lifting the Beermen to a 125–123 victory over Presto as the Tivolis absorbed their second straight loss in the semifinals of the All-Filipino Conference after sweeping the eliminations with 10 straight victories.

August 7: The Beermen clinch the win-five incentive and a playoff for one of the two finals berth by winning over Presto Tivoli, 110–109, on Alvin Teng's two free throws with no time left.

November 6: The Beermen outclassed Shell Rimula-X, 148–132, to close out their stint in the third conference with four wins against six losses, winning their last three matches. Their victory was rendered meaningless when the Sarsi Sizzlers triumph over Purefoods earlier in the first game. San Miguel will have their worst finish as they failed to advance into the next round for the first time since the 1986 Third Conference when the ballclub return to the league after a two-conference leave.

== Occurrences ==
San Miguel played without four key men in their first three outings in the third conference. Ramon Fernandez, Samboy Lim, Hector Calma and Yves Dignadice, along with coach Norman Black, were all part of the PBA-backed National team in the Beijing Asian Games. The Beermen did welcome the return of Ricardo Brown from the lineup but he only saw action in their first game, a 147–149 loss to Añejo Rum on October 2.

== Roster ==
1990 San Miguel Beermen roster
Players

Pos.	#	POB	Name	Height	Weight	DOB (YYYY–MM–DD)	From
G	5	(Philippines)	Franz Pumaren	5 ft 9 in (1.75 m)			De La Salle
G	6	(Philippines)	Ato Agustin	5 ft 11 in (1.80 m)			Lyceum
F	7	(Philippines)	Alfie Almario	6 ft 0 in (1.83 m)			De La Salle
F	8	(Philippines)	Bobby Jose	6 ft 3 in (1.91 m)			UST
F	9	(Philippines)	Samboy Lim	6 ft 0 in (1.83 m)			Letran
F/C	10	(Philippines)	Alvin Teng	6 ft 4 in (1.93 m)			Arellano
F/C	12	(Philippines)	Yves Dignadice	6 ft 4 in (1.93 m)			STI WNU
G	14	(Philippines)	Hector Calma	5 ft 9 in (1.75 m)			Adamson
C	19	(Philippines)	Ramon Fernandez	6 ft 4 in (1.93 m)			San Carlos
F	22	(Philippines)	Edgardo Postanes	6 ft 1 in (1.85 m)			Far Eastern
G	23	(United States)	Ricardo Brown	6 ft 0 in (1.83 m)			Pepperdine
F	29	(Philippines)	Josel Angeles	6 ft 3 in (1.91 m)			Lyceum

Coaches

Head coach

- (United States) Norman Black

Assistant coach(es)

- (Philippines) Derrick Pumaren
- (Philippines) Filomeno Pumaren

Team manager

- (Philippines) Eddie Veneracion

Legend

- (C) Team captain
- Injured

=== Recruited imports ===
Name	Conference	No.	Pos.	Ht.	College	Duration
Norman Black	First Conference	24	Center-Forward	6"5'	Saint Joseph's University	February 18 to May 10
Michael Phelps	Third Conference	25	Forward	6"3'	Alcorn State University	October 2 to November 6
Richard Morton	Third Conference	21	Forward	6"3'	Cal State-Fullerton	October 2–23
Ricky Wilson	Third Conference	15	Forward-Center	6"3'	George Mason University	October 28 to November 6
