= 2003 Barangay Ginebra Kings season =

- Head coach: Allan Caidic
- General manager: Ira Maniquis
- Owner: Danding Cojuangco

All-Filipino Cup results
- Record: 6–15 (28.6%)
- Place: N/A
- Playoff finish: N/A

Mabuhay Cup results
- Record: 2–2 (50%)
- Place: N/A
- Playoff finish: N/A

Reinforced Conference results
- Record: 8–8 (50%)
- Place: N/A
- Playoff finish: QF (lost to Coca Cola)

Barangay Ginebra Kings seasons

The 2003 Barangay Ginebra Kings season was the 25th season of the franchise in the Philippine Basketball Association (PBA).

== Transactions ==
Players Added

Via Draft

- Rommel Adducul
- Sunday Salvacion
- Rob Johnson

Via Free Agency

- Ernesto Ballesteros (From Coca-Cola Tigers)
- Alex Crisano (From Talk 'N Text Phone Pals)
- Aries Dimaunahan (Drafted by Ginebra last season)
- Jeffrey Sanders (Formerly of MBA)
Players Lost

Via Free Agency

- Jayjay Helterbrand (Released; couldn't agree on a pay cut)
- Ronald Magtulis (To Purefoods TJ Hotdogs)
- Wilmer Ong (To Sta. Lucia Realtors)

== Occurrences ==
Barangay Ginebra was coming off a three-game losing streak when they defeated Talk 'N Text, 122–117 in double overtime on March 21, with Eric Menk scoring a personal high 45 points while TNT rookie Jimmy Alapag scored 40 points. That game was forfeited and ordered replayed upon protest by the Phone Pals as Barangay Ginebra failed to free itself from a three-game slide.

== Roster ==
2003 Barangay Ginebra Kings roster
Players

Pos.	#	POB	Name	Height	Weight	DOB (YYYY–MM–DD)	From
G	1	(Philippines)	Bal David	5 ft 9 in (1.75 m)			UST
G/F	3	(Philippines)	Elmer Lago	6 ft 2 in (1.88 m)			De La Salle
F/C	9	(Philippines)	Jun Limpot	6 ft 5 in (1.96 m)			De La Salle
C	10	(Philippines)	Rommel Adducul	6 ft 6 in (1.98 m)			San Sebastian
C	14	(Philippines)	Aramis Calpito	6 ft 5 in (1.96 m)			San Sebastian
F	16	(Philippines)	Estong Ballesteros	6 ft 3 in (1.91 m)			UST
F	17	(Philippines)	Chester Tolomia	6 ft 2 in (1.88 m)			UPHSD
F	19	(Philippines)	Gilbert Malabanan	6 ft 4 in (1.93 m)			UPHSD
F		(United States)	Jeffrey Sanders	6 ft 3 in (1.91 m)
G	25	(United States)	Rob Johnson	6 ft 0 in (1.83 m)			Bellevue
F/C	30	(United States)	Eric Menk	6 ft 6 in (1.98 m)			Lake Superior State
C	43	(United States)	Alex Crisano	6 ft 5 in (1.96 m)			Brooklyn
G	47	(Philippines)	Mark Caguioa	6 ft 0 in (1.83 m)			Glendale CC (CA)
F	80	(Philippines)	Sunday Salvacion	6 ft 3 in (1.91 m)			St. Benilde
G	88	(Philippines)	Aries Dimaunahan	6 ft 0 in (1.83 m)			UST
F	6	(United States)	Ricky Price (I)	6 ft 4 in (1.93 m)
F	26	(United States)	Rosell Ellis (I)	6 ft 6 in (1.98 m)			McNeese State

Coaches
Head coach
- (Philippines) Allan Caidic
Assistant(s)
- (Philippines) Binky Favis
- (Philippines) George Ella
- (Philippines) Juno Sauler

Legend
- (DP) Unsigned draft pick
- (FA) Free agent
- (S) Suspended
- (I) Import
- Injured

== Game results ==
=== All-Filipino Cup ===
Date	Opponent	Score	Top scorer	Venue	Location
February 26	Purefoods	84–76	Limpot (30 pts)	Philsports Arena	Pasig
March 1	Sta.Lucia	89–82			Baguio City
March 7	Alaska	91–95	Limpot (26 pts)	Ynares Center	Antipolo City
March 14	San Miguel	76–80		Philsports Arena	Pasig
March 16	Coca-Cola	79–83	Menk (24 pts)	Araneta Coliseum	Quezon City
March 21 (Ordered replay)	Talk 'N Text	122–117 2OT	Menk (45 pts)	Araneta Coliseum	Quezon City
March 28	Sta.Lucia	97–103		Araneta Coliseum	Quezon City
March 30	FedEx	101–81	Menk (38 pts)	Araneta Coliseum	Quezon City
April 5	Purefoods	69–73			Lucena City
April 9	Alaska			Philsports Arena	Pasig
April 13	Red Bull	97–105	Menk (38 pts)	Philsports Arena	Pasig
April 20	Shell	76–71		Araneta Coliseum	Quezon City
April 22 (Replay)	Talk 'N Text	87–90	Caguioa (26 pts)	Araneta Coliseum	Quezon City
April 26	Coca-Cola	54–83		Ynares Center	Antipolo City
May 2	FedEx	81–85		Philsports Arena	Pasig
May 7	San Miguel	97–103		Philsports Arena	Pasig
May 11	Talk 'N Text	99–82	Menk (30 pts)	Araneta Coliseum	Quezon City
May 16	Red Bull	83–101		Ynares Center	Antipolo City
May 25	Shell	69–64	Menk (31 pts)	Araneta Coliseum	Quezon City

Win
Win via OT
loss
loss via OT
