= Bobby Parks =

American basketball player (1961–2013)

Personal information
- Born: November 26, 1961 Grand Junction, Tennessee, U.S.
- Died: March 30, 2013 (aged 51) Pasay, Philippines
- Listed height: 6 ft 3 in (1.91 m)

Career information
- High school: Middleton (Middleton, Tennessee)
- College: Memphis State (1980–1984)
- NBA draft: 1984: 3rd round, 58th overall pick
- Drafted by: Atlanta Hawks
- Playing career: 1984–1999
- Position: Guard
- Number: 22

Career history

Playing
- 1985–1986: Pensacola Tornados
- 1986–1987: Mississippi Jets
- 1987: San Miguel Beer
- 1988–1989: Formula Shell
- 1988: Anejo Rhum 65ers
- 1989–1990: Rockford Lightning
- 1990–1993: Formula Shell
- 1993–1994: Rochester Renegade
- 1994–1997: Aspac Jakarta
- 1997–1999: Formula Shell

Coaching
- 1990: Formula Shell
- 2011–2012: Petron Blaze Boosters (assistant)
- 2012: San Miguel Beermen

Career highlights
- As player: 3× PBA champion (1987 Reinforced, 1990 First Conference, 1992 First Conference); 7× PBA Best Import Award (1987–1992); 1988 PBA/IBA World Challenge Cup champion (Special conference); 2x Kobatama champion (1995, 1996); CBA All-Defensive Second Team (1986); As assistant coach: PBA champion (2011 Governors')
- Stats at Basketball Reference

Bobby Ray Parks Sr. (November 26, 1961 – March 30, 2013) was an American professional basketball player from Grand Junction, Tennessee. He played for Memphis State University (now the University of Memphis) from 1980 to 1984 and played internationally in the Philippines, Indonesia and France. As one of the most celebrated "import" players in the Philippine Basketball Association (PBA), Parks became the second American ever inducted into the PBA Hall of Fame in 2009.

== College career ==
Bobby Parks came to Memphis State University in the fall of 1980 under head coach Dana Kirk. Over the next four seasons he helped the Tigers to an 86–34 record, two Metro Conference Championships and three appearances in the NCAA Tournament. He appeared in 27 games as a freshman and totaled 238 points.

During his second season with the Tigers, 1981–82, Parks upped his scoring average to 11.4 points per game in leading the team to a 24–5 record. As a junior, Parks received All-America honors from The Sporting News after scoring 488 points and helping his team to an NCAA Midwest Region invitation. He capped his Memphis career by again averaging in double figures in scoring and finished his senior season with a Sweet 16 appearance in the NCAA Tournament. Parks is now ranked 15th in his alma mater's career scoring with 1,266 points.

== Professional career ==
=== Continental Basketball Association ===
Parks was chosen in the third round by the Atlanta Hawks in the 1984 NBA draft, the 58th player of 228 chosen in the draft. Wearing his trademark no. 22, Parks played for the Hawks in the NBA pre-season but was cut before the regular campaign started. He also played parts of four seasons in the Continental Basketball Association, appearing in 83 games for the Pensacola Tornados, Mississippi Jets, Rockford Lightning and Rochester Renegade between 1985 and 1994. He was selected to the CBA All-Defensive Second Team in 1986.

=== Philippines ===
Parks began his professional basketball career overseas, playing in France in 1986 before moving to the Philippines in 1987, where he would eventually become one of the greatest imports in PBA history. He made his PBA debut with the San Miguel Beer in 1987 and, the following year, joined Formula Shell, where he played until 1999. Over a remarkable 12-year PBA career, Parks amassed nearly 9,000 points, more than 3,000 rebounds, and over 1,000 assists in 220 games. His most prolific season came in 1989, when he averaged an astounding 52.6 points per game in 23 games, including a career-high 72-point performance.

Parks captured a record seven Best Import awards and helped lead San Miguel and Shell to a combined three PBA championships. Beyond basketball, he also appeared in several Filipino films, further cementing his popularity and legacy in the Philippines.

=== Indonesia ===
After his PBA stint, Parks went to Indonesia to play for Aspac Jakarta in the Kobatama (Kompetisi Bola Basket Utama) competition. Parks, called by Indonesian fans as 'The Ice Man' or 'Uncle Bob,' suited up as import for the Indonesian club teams in the Seaba tournament and Asian Basketball Confederation (now FIBA-Asia) Champions Cup. Parks involved in bringing Aspac to final since 1994 and dedicated two titles in 1995 and 1996. Parks sweetly closed his stint in Indonesia in 1997, when Aspac defeated Indonesia Muda with 112–99. Parks made 12 3-point shots to break the previous record set by Pelita Jaya's Aprijadi who made 10. Parks dominated the Indonesian league.

== Coaching record ==
=== PBA ===
Team	Season	Conference	Elims./Clas. round					Playoffs				
Team	Season	Conference	GP	W	L	PCT	Finish	PG	W	L	PCT	Results
Formula Shell	1990	First	10	8	2	.800	2nd	8	6	2	.750	Replaced after the semifinal round
Career total			10	8	2	.800	Playoff Total	8	6	2	.750	0 PBA championship

== Retirement ==
He returned to Memphis in 2005, partly to finish his degree under the invitation of coach John Calipari and the athletic department. Another motivation for the move was to bring his son Bobby Jr. (also known as "Ray Ray"), a promising teenage player, to Memphis to expose him to better basketball competition. Parks also served as the personal assistant to John Paul "Jack" Jones, a wealthy University of Virginia alumnus from Memphis who is the namesake for UVA's current basketball arena.

On June 2, 2010, Parks and his family moved back to the Philippines. Parks accepted a position as athletics director at National University in Manila. During that time, he was suffering from laryngeal cancer; his treatment was reported to be successful in April 2011. In November 2010, Bobby Jr. signed a letter of intent to play basketball at Georgia Tech, but then disappeared from the view of both Tech and the American media for several months. Eventually, Luke Winn of Sports Illustrated tracked the younger Parks down, discovering in April 2011 that Bobby Jr. had enrolled at NU and was expected to lead the Bulldogs in the upcoming UAAP season.

In 2011, the San Miguel Beermen (ABL) joined the ASEAN Basketball League and named Parks its first head coach. He led the team to a finals appearance, losing to the Indonesia Warriors.

== Death ==
On March 30, 2013 (Black Saturday), Parks died after a lengthy period suffering from lung cancer, which developed from his previously untreated laryngeal cancer.

== Legacy ==
To commemorate Parks' legacy, the PBA renamed the prestigious "PBA Best Import of the Conference Award" to the "Bobby Parks PBA Best Import of the Conference Award". The award was renamed on March 31, 2013, a day after Parks' death, as it coincided with the scheduled awarding during the 2013 PBA Commissioner's Cup. The first recipient of the renamed award was Robert Dozier of the Alaska Aces—coincidentally, also a former Memphis player.

Parks became the second American and the first import ever inducted into the PBA Hall of Fame on October 9, 2009.

Parks was inducted into the University of Memphis' M Club Hall of Fame on September 10, 2004.
