= 1990 PBA season =

16th PBA season

- Duration: February 18, 1990 – December 20, 1990
- Teams: 8
- TV partner: Vintage Sports (PTV)

1990 PBA Draft
- Top draft pick: Peter Jao
- Picked by: Presto Tivolis
- Season MVP: Allan Caidic (Presto Tivolis)
- First Conference champions: Formula Shell Zoom Masters
- First Conference runners-up: Añejo Rum 65ers
- All-Filipino Conference champions: Presto Tivolis
- All-Filipino Conference runners-up: Purefoods Hotdogs
- Third Conference champions: Purefoods Hotdogs
- Third Conference runners-up: Alaska Air Force

Seasons
- ← 1989 1991 →

The 1990 PBA season was the 16th season of the Philippine Basketball Association (PBA).

== Board of governors ==
=== Executive committee ===
- Rudy Salud (Commissioner)
- Rey Marquez (Chairman, representing Formula Shell Zoom Masters)
- Wilfred Steven Uytengsu, representing Alaska Milkmen)
- Lance Gokongwei (Treasurer, representing Presto Tivolis)

=== Teams ===
Team	Company	Governor
Alaska Milkmen	General Milling Corporation	Wilfred Steven Uytengsu
Añejo Rum 65ers	La Tondeña Distillers, Inc.	Carlos Palanca III
Pepsi Hotshots	Pepsi-Cola Products Philippines, Inc.	Luis Lorenzo, Sr.
Pop Cola Sizzlers	Republic Flour Mills Corporation	Elmer Yanga
Presto Tivolis	Consolidated Foods Corporation	Lance Gokongwei
Purefoods Hotdogs	Purefoods Corporation	Renato Buhain
San Miguel Beermen	San Miguel Corporation	Nazario Avendaño
Formula Shell Zoom Masters	Pilipinas Shell Petroleum Corporation	Reynaldo Marquez

== Season highlights ==
- The PBA increased its membership from 6 to 8 teams, with the entry of expansion franchises RFM/Cosmos Bottling, Inc. and Pepsi-Cola. The 6 regular PBA ballclubs were allowed to protect 9 players from its rosters, the two new teams will pick those players in the expansion pool.
- Formula Shell won their first PBA title after five years of participation, but the biggest story of the year was the walkout of Añejo Rum 65 in Game 6 of the First Conference finals, the 65ers were heavily fined a total of P550,000.
- Presto Tivolis won the All-Filipino crown at the expense of Purefoods Hotdogs for their first title in three years and sixth overall.
- With the advent of "Open basketball" being approved, professional basketball players are now allowed to play in the international tournaments such as the Olympics and World championships, the PBA send an all-pro team to the Beijing Asian Games in September and chosen to coach the PBA-backed national team is Añejo playing coach Robert Jaworski. Despite only two weeks to prepare and injuries and problems hounding the team even from the time it was formed, the All-Pro nationals won a silver medal finish, behind host China.
- Purefoods Hotdogs came back from a 0-2 overhaul to win the Third Conference title and their first championship with a 3-2 series win over Alaska Milk, becoming only the second team to have won three straight after falling behind two games to none, the Hotdogs duplicated the feat achieved by the Crispa Redmanizers in 1976. Coach Baby Dalupan, the league's winningest coach, won his 15th title.

== Opening ceremonies ==
The muses for the participating teams are as follows:

Team	Muse
Alaska Milkmen	Lara Melissa de Leon
Añejo Rum 65	Connie Fortaleza
Formula Shell	Sarah Jane Paez and Precious Tongko
Pepsi Hotshots	Dina Bonnevie
Pop Cola	Aiko Melendez
Presto Tivolis	Gem Padilla (Bb.Pilipinas-Universe)
Purefoods Hotdogs	Sharon Cuneta
San Miguel Beermen	Marilen Gonzales and Star Querubin

== Champions ==
- First Conference: Formula Shell Zoom Masters
- All-Filipino Conference: Presto Tivolis
- Third Conference: Purefoods Hotdogs
- Team with best win–loss percentage: Formula Shell Zoom Masters (35-21, .625)
- Best Team of the Year: Purefoods Hotdogs (1st)

== First Conference ==
=== Elimination round ===
Pos	Team	W	L	PCT	GB	Qualification
1	Añejo Rum 65ers	8	2	.800	—	Semifinal round
2	Formula Shell Zoom Masters	8	2	.800	—	Semifinal round
3	Presto Tivolis	7	3	.700	1	Semifinal round
4	Alaska Air Force	6	4	.600	2	Semifinal round
5	San Miguel Beermen	5	5	.500	3	Semifinal round
6	Purefoods Hotdogs	3	7	.300	5	
7	Pop Cola Sizzlers	2	8	.200	6	
8	Pepsi Hotshots	1	9	.100	7	

=== Semifinal round ===
Overall standings
Pos	Team	W	L	PCT	GB	Qualification
1	Formula Shell Zoom Masters	14	4	.778	—	Advance to the finals
2	Añejo Rum 65ers	12	6	.667	2	Advance to the finals
3	Presto Tivolis	10	8	.556	4	Proceed to third place playoffs
4	San Miguel Beermen	9	9	.500 (Note: Head-to-head record: San Miguel 2–1 Alaska)	5	Proceed to third place playoffs
5	Alaska Air Force	9	9	.500	5	

Notes:

Semifinal round standings
Pos	Team	W	L
1	Formula Shell Zoom Masters	6	2
2	Añejo Rum 65ers	4	4
3	San Miguel Beermen	4	4
4	Presto Tivolis	3	5
5	Alaska Air Force	3	5

=== Third place playoffs ===
Team 1	Series	Team 2	Game 1	Game 2	Game 3	Game 4	Game 5
(3) Presto Tivolis	1–3	(4) San Miguel Beermen	101–102	114–127	106–97	105–111	—

=== Finals ===
Team 1	Series	Team 2	Game 1	Game 2	Game 3	Game 4	Game 5	Game 6	Game 7
(1) Formula Shell Zoom Masters	4–2	(2) Añejo Rum 65ers	134–131	127–135	156–134	138–135 (OT)	101–130	62–47 (Note: Añejo Rum walked out of the game with 2:52 left in the second quarter. The league awarded Shell with a Game 6 title-clinching win by forfeiture.)	—

- Best Import of the Conference: Bobby Parks (Shell)

== All-Filipino Conference ==
=== Elimination round ===
Pos	Team	W	L	PCT	GB	Qualification
1	Presto Tivolis	10	0	1.000	—	Semifinal round
2	Purefoods Hotdogs	7	3	.700	3	Semifinal round
3	Añejo Rum 65ers	7	3	.700	3	Semifinal round
4	Alaska Air Force	6	4	.600	4	Semifinal round
5	San Miguel Beermen	5	5	.500	5	Semifinal round
6	Formula Shell Zoom Masters	3	7	.300	7	
7	Pepsi Hotshots	1	9	.100	9	
8	Pop Cola Sizzlers	1	9	.100	9	

=== Semifinal round ===
Overall standings
Pos	Team	W	L	PCT	GB	Qualification
1	Purefoods Hotdogs	13	5	.722 (Note: Head-to-head record: Purefoods 2–1 Presto)	—	Advance to the finals (Note: If a team outside the top two teams wins at least five semifinal round games, then it and the second-placed team will playoff for the last finals berth; otherwise, the top 2 teams qualify outright.)
2	Presto Tivolis	13	5	.722	—	Guaranteed finals berth playoff
3	Añejo Rum 65ers	12	6	.667	1	Proceed to third place playoffs
4	San Miguel Beermen	11	7	.611	2	Qualify to finals berth playoff
5	Alaska Air Force	6	12	.333	7	

Notes:

Semifinal round standings
Pos	Team	W	L	Qualification
1	Purefoods Hotdogs	6	2	
2	San Miguel Beermen	6	2	Qualify to finals berth playoffs (Note: Purefoods advanced to the finals outright as #1 seeded team; Añejo and San Miguel played off in the first round of the finals berth playoffs for winning at least five semifinal games and finishing outside of the top 2; finals playoffs: San Miguel 132–117 Añejo, Presto 117–115 San Miguel)
3	Añejo Rum 65ers	5	3	Qualify to finals berth playoffs
4	Presto Tivolis	3	5	
5	Alaska Air Force	0	8	

=== Third place playoffs ===
Team 1	Series	Team 2	Game 1	Game 2	Game 3	Game 4	Game 5
(3) Añejo Rum 65ers	3–1	(4) San Miguel Beermen	131–125	125–146	123–114	129–123	—

=== Finals ===
Team 1	Series	Team 2	Game 1	Game 2	Game 3	Game 4	Game 5	Game 6	Game 7
(1) Purefoods Hotdogs	3–4	(2) Presto Tivolis	95–99	125–124	111–115	139–125	119–123	128–117	96–115

== Third Conference ==
=== Elimination round ===
Pos	Team	W	L	PCT	GB	Qualification
1	Alaska Air Force	8	2	.800	—	Semifinal round
2	Formula Shell Zoom Masters	7	3	.700	1	Semifinal round
3	Presto Tivolis	6	4	.600	2	Semifinal round
4	Purefoods Hotdogs	6	4	.600	2	Semifinal round
5	Sarsi Sizzlers	5	5	.500	3	Semifinal round
6	San Miguel Beermen	4	6	.400	4	
7	Añejo Rum 65ers	4	6	.400	4	
8	Pepsi Hotshots	0	10	.000	8	

=== Semifinal round ===
Overall standings
Pos	Team	W	L	PCT	GB	Qualification
1	Alaska Air Force	12	6	.667	—	Advance to the Finals
2	Purefoods Hotdogs	11	7	.611 (Note: Head-to-head quotient: Purefoods 1.031, Shell 0.991, Presto 0.977; second seed playoffs: Shell 137–114 Presto, Purefoods 121–101 Shell)	1	Advance to the Finals
3	Shell Rimula X	11	7	.611	1	Proceed to third place playoffs
4	Presto Tivolis	11	7	.611	1	Proceed to third place playoffs
5	Sarsi Sizzlers	7	11	.389	5	

Notes:

Semifinal round standings
Pos	Team	W	L
1	Purefoods Hotdogs	5	3
2	Presto Tivolis	5	3
3	Shell Rimula X	4	4
4	Alaska Air Force	4	4
5	Sarsi Sizzlers	2	6

=== Third place playoffs ===
Team 1	Series	Team 2	Game 1	Game 2	Game 3
(3) Shell Rimula X	2–0	(4) Presto Tivolis	139–123	141–132	—

=== Finals ===
Team 1	Series	Team 2	Game 1	Game 2	Game 3	Game 4	Game 5
(1) Alaska Air Force	2–3	(2) Purefoods Hotdogs	105–103	118–112	103–117	99–104 (OT)	98–99

- Best Import of the Conference: Bobby Parks (Shell)

== Awards ==
- Most Valuable Player: Allan Caidic (Presto)
- Rookie of the Year: Gerry Esplana (Presto)
- Most Improved Player: Rey Cuenco (Añejo)
- Mythical Five:
  - Ronnie Magsanoc (Shell)
  - Paul Alvarez (Alaska)
  - Benjie Paras (Shell)
  - Alvin Patrimonio (Purefoods)
  - Allan Caidic (Presto)
- Mythical Second Team:
  - Samboy Lim (San Miguel)
  - Rudy Distrito (Añejo)
  - Ramon Fernandez (San Miguel)
  - Elpidio Villamin (Alaska)
  - Rey Cuenco (Añejo)
- All-Defensive Team:
  - Abe King (Presto)
  - Glenn Capacio (Purefoods)
  - Alvin Teng (San Miguel)
  - Elpidio Villamin (Alaska)
  - Chito Loyzaga (Añejo)

== Cumulative standings ==
Pos	Team	Pld	W	L	PCT	Best finish
1	Formula Shell Zoom Masters	56	35	21	.625	Champions
2	Presto Tivolis	69	40	29	.580	Champions
3	Añejo Rum 65ers	57	33	24	.579	Finalist
4	Purefoods Hotdogs	59	34	25	.576	Champions
5	San Miguel Beermen	56	29	27	.518	Third place
6	Alaska Air Force	59	29	30	.492	Finalist
7	Pop Cola/Sarsi Sizzlers	39	10	29	.256	Semifinalist
8	Pepsi Hotshots	30	2	28	.067	Elimination round

=== Elimination round ===
Pos	Team	Pld	W	L	PCT
1	Presto Tivolis	30	23	7	.767
2	Alaska Air Force	30	20	10	.667
3	Añejo Rum 65ers	30	19	11	.633
4	Formula Shell Zoom Masters	30	18	12	.600
5	Purefoods Hotdogs	30	16	14	.533
6	San Miguel Beermen	30	14	16	.467
7	Pop Cola/Sarsi Sizzlers	30	8	22	.267
8	Pepsi Hotshots	30	2	28	.067

=== Playoffs ===
Pos	Team	Pld	W	L
1	Purefoods Hotdogs	29	18	11
2	Formula Shell Zoom Masters	26	17	9
3	Presto Tivolis	39	17	22
4	San Miguel Beermen	26	15	11
5	Añejo Rum 65ers	27	14	13
6	Alaska Air Force	29	9	20
7	Pop Cola/Sarsi Sizzlers	8	2	6
8	Pepsi Hotshots	0	0	0
