= 1990 Añejo Rum 65ers season =

- Head coach: Robert Jaworski
- General manager: Bernabe Navarro
- Owners: La Tondeña Distillers, Inc.

First Conference results
- Record: 14–10 (58.3%)
- Place: 2nd
- Playoff finish: Finals

All-Filipino Conference results
- Record: 15–8 (65.2%)
- Place: 3rd
- Playoff finish: Semifinals

Third Conference results
- Record: 4–6 (40%)
- Place: 6th
- Playoff finish: Eliminated

Añejo Rum 65ers seasons

The 1990 Añejo Rum 65ers season was the 12th season of the franchise in the Philippine Basketball Association (PBA).

== Draft picks ==
Round	Pick	Player	Details
1	6	Hilario Villanil	Signed
2	14	Fernando Libed	Unsigned, free agent

== The finals walkout ==
In the first championship of the 1990s era, crowd-favorite Añejo Rum lost to Formula Shell in the finals which ended in a walkout by the 65ers in Game Six. The Añejo coaching staff found the officiating too close for comfort as they were assessed a total of 20 fouls with import Sylvester Gray saddled with five fouls with still four minutes left in the second quarter. The two technicals slapped by referees Rudy Hines and Ernie De leon on Añejo forward Rey Cuenco triggered the walkout with still 2:52 left in the second period of Game Six, the Shell Zoom Masters on top, 62–47.

== Occurrences ==
Last year's best import Carlos Briggs return and teamed up with Toney Mack for the Third Conference. The 65ers missed the services early of playing-coach Jaworski, assistant coach Rino Salazar and three key players, Chito Loyzaga, Dante Gonzalgo and Rey Cuenco, who were members of the all-pro team in the Beijing Asian Games. Compounding their woes was the exit of Carlos Briggs, whose attitude problems convince management to replace him after just three games in favor of Darryl Joe.

Sonny Jaworski committed a punching foul on new Purefoods import Robert Paul Rose in their last game of the season as the 65ers were eliminated by Purefoods from the Third Conference semis. The Big J let go of a flying elbow with seconds left of an already won ballgame by the Hotdogs. The Añejo playing-coach was fined and suspended for one game, which took effect the following season.

== Notable dates ==
March 20: New Anejo import Sylvester Gray, who replaces Glenn Dedmon after six games, had an excellent debut in Anejo's 120–106 win over league-leading Shell. The former Miami Heat scored 26 points on top of 27 rebounds.

April 5: Dante Gonzalgo buried a gun-beating triple made possible by Yves Dignadice's two misses from the stripe as Añejo escape with a 123–122 victory over San Miguel Beermen. It was the 65ers seventh straight win and second victory in the semifinals that pushed their won-loss slate to 10-2 while the Beermen fell to five wins and seven losses.

April 24: Anejo sealed a finals clash with Shell Zoom Masters in the first conference following a 150–113 rout over Presto Tivolis for their 12th win in 17 games. The 65ers were coming off a three-game losing streak after an eight-game winning run.

June 12: In their first game since the walkout in game six of the First Conference finals, Añejo Rum won against sister team San Miguel Beermen, 105–89.

June 21: Philip Cezar drove in a twinner with one second left and lifted Añejo Rum 65 to a 143–141 overtime victory over Pop Cola.

July 6: Sonny Jaworski scored 29 points and made his second attempt from the free throw line with a second left that won the game for Añejo in a pulsating 101–100 victory over Pop Cola in Cagayan de Oro.

August 14: Anejo finally broke a three-game losing spell to Purefoods by downing the Hotdogs, 136–125, to gain a playoff for the second finals berth in the All-Filipino Conference. Rudy Distrito exploded with a high of 47 points as the 65ers completed an amazing run of five straight wins after losing their first three games in the semifinals.

== Roster ==
1990 Añejo Rum 65ers roster
Players

Pos.	#	POB	Name	Height	Weight	DOB (YYYY–MM–DD)	From
C	4	(Philippines)	Peter Aguilar	6 ft 5 in (1.96 m)			Trinity
G	5	(Philippines)	Mukesh Advani	5 ft 10 in (1.78 m)			San Beda
F	6	(Philippines)	Dondon Ampalayo	6 ft 3 in (1.91 m)			USJ–R
G	7	(Philippines)	Robert Jaworski	6 ft 1 in (1.85 m)			UE
G	9	(Philippines)	Leo Isaac	6 ft 1 in (1.85 m)			Mapúa
F	10	(Philippines)	Freddie Hubalde	6 ft 1 in (1.85 m)			Mapúa
F	12	(Philippines)	Dante Gonzalgo	6 ft 2 in (1.88 m)			Lyceum
F	14	(Philippines)	Larry Villanil	6 ft 1 in (1.85 m)			Visayas
C	15	(Philippines)	Rey Cuenco	6 ft 4 in (1.93 m)			GAUF
G	17	(Philippines)	Rudy Distrito	5 ft 11 in (1.80 m)			UE
F	18	(Philippines)	Philip Cezar	6 ft 3 in (1.91 m)			JRC
C	22	(Philippines)	Romulo Mamaril	6 ft 6 in (1.98 m)			Mapúa
G/F	41	(Philippines)	Chito Loyzaga	6 ft 2 in (1.88 m)			San Beda

Coaches

Head coach

- (Philippines) Robert Jaworski

Assistant coach(es)

- (Philippines) Rino Salazar

Team manager

- (Philippines) Bernabe Navarro

Legend

- (C) Team captain
- Injured

== Transactions ==
=== Additions ===
Player	Signed	Former team
Freddie Hubalde	Off-season	Shell
Mukesh Advani	Off-season	Re-signed, activate from reserve list

=== Recruited imports ===
Name	Conference	No.	Pos.	Ht.	College	Duration
Glenn Dedmon	First Conference	32	Center-Forward	6"5'	Southern University	February 20 to March 15
Sylvester Gray	First Conference	00	Center-Forward	6"5'	Memphis State	March 20 to May 15
Toney Mack	Third Conference	21	Center-Forward	6"5'	University of Georgia	October 2 to November 8
Carlos Briggs	Third Conference	24	Guard-Forward	5"11'	Baylor University	October 2–11
Darryl Joe	Third Conference	3	Guard-Forward	6"1'	Louisiana State	October 18 to November 8
