= 1990 Alaska Air Force season =

- Head coach: Tim Cone
- General Manager: Joaqui Trillo
- Owner(s): Alaska Milk Corporation

First Conference results
- Record: 9–9 (50%)
- Place: 5th
- Playoff finish: Semifinals

All-Filipino Conference results
- Record: 6–12 (33.3%)
- Place: 5th
- Playoff finish: Semifinals

Third Conference results
- Record: 14–9 (60.9%)
- Place: 2nd
- Playoff finish: Runner Up

Alaska Air Force seasons

The 1990 Alaska Air Force season was the 5th season of the franchise in the Philippine Basketball Association (PBA).

== Draft picks ==
Round	Pick	Player	Details
2	12	Macario Torres	Signed
3	19	Loreto Manaog	Signed
4	25	David Zamar	Unsigned, free agent

== Scoring record ==
April 26: Paul Alvarez scored a record-breaking 71 points in Alaska's 169-138 win over Shell. The 71-point output by Mr.Excitement surpass Allan Caidic's 68 points set in November of last year.

== Occurrences ==
Assistant coach Chot Reyes took over the coaching duties from coach Tim Cone for a couple of games in the All-Filipino Conference following the Basketball Coaches of the Philippines (BCOP) decision issuing a temporary restraining order preventing coach Tim Cone from handling the team. Reyes led Alaska to its first win in the conference with a 100-99 squeaker over Purefoods on June 17.

== Runner-up finish ==
Sean Chambers return as their import in the Third Conference and along with Carlos Clark, a member of the 1984 NBA World Champions Boston Celtics. The Airmen were the top team in the elimination round with eight wins and two losses, they scored their 12th victory in 17 games against Shell, 114-94 on November 27. The Airmen got a free ride for the first finals berth when Purefoods lost to Sarsi in their last game in the semifinals on December 2.

Alaska went on to battle the Purefoods Hotdogs for the Third Conference championship and came so close in winning their first PBA title after surging ahead, 2-0 in the best-of-five finals series, only to lose the remaining three games. High-leaping Paul Alvarez, who played the hero's role in their first two victories, was injured in Game three and was out for the rest of the final playoffs.

== Roster ==
1990 Alaska Air Force roster
Players

Pos.	#	POB	Name	Height	Weight	DOB (YYYY–MM–DD)	From
F	3	(Philippines)	Edgardo Cordero	6 ft 0 in (1.83 m)			UST
G/F	6	(Philippines)	Biboy Ravanes	6 ft 0 in (1.83 m)			Cebu
G/F	8	(Philippines)	Loreto Manaog	6 ft 1 in (1.85 m)
G/F	9	(Philippines)	Boy Cabahug	5 ft 11 in (1.80 m)			Visayas
C	10	(Philippines)	Adriano Polistico	6 ft 7 in (2.01 m)			Letran
G	11	(Philippines)	Eric Altamirano	5 ft 9 in (1.75 m)			UP Diliman
F	12	(Philippines)	Rey Lazaro	6 ft 1 in (1.85 m)			Far Eastern
F/C	13	(Philippines)	Elpidio Villamin	6 ft 3 in (1.91 m)
C	16	(Philippines)	Macario Torres	6 ft 4 in (1.93 m)			Far Eastern
F	21	(Philippines)	Paul Alvarez	6 ft 0 in (1.83 m)			San Sebastian
G	22	(Philippines)	Frankie Lim	5 ft 10 in (1.78 m)			San Beda
G	23	(Philippines)	Ric-Ric Marata	5 ft 8 in (1.73 m)			Southwestern-U
F	24	(Philippines)	Harmon Codinera	6 ft 3 in (1.91 m)			Far Eastern

Coaches

Head coach

- (United States) Tim Cone

Assistant coach(es)

- (Philippines) Chot Reyes
- (Philippines) Aric del Rosario

Legend

- (C) Team captain
- Injured

== Transactions ==
=== Mid-season acquisition ===
Player	Signed	Details
Edgardo Cordero	July 1990	Signed up to replace the injured Macario Torres

=== Trades ===
September 1990	To Pepsi #32 Abet Guidaben	To Alaska Harmon Codinera

=== Recruited imports ===
Name	Conference	No.	Pos.	Ht.	College	Duration
Anthony Simms	First Conference	34	Forward	6"5'	Boston University	February 20 to April 29
Sean Chambers	Third Conference	20	Forward	6"1'	Cal Poly San Luis Obispo	September 30 to December 20
Carlos Clark	Third Conference	4	Forward	6"4'	University of Mississippi	October 7 to December 20
