= 1990 Shell Rimula X season =

- Head coach: Bobby Parks; Arlene Rodriguez
- General Manager: Charlie Favis
- Owner(s): Pilipinas Shell, Inc.

First Conference results
- Record: 18–6 (75%)
- Place: 1st
- Playoff finish: Finals

All-Filipino Conference results
- Record: 3–7 (30%)
- Place: 6th
- Playoff finish: Eliminated

Third Conference results
- Record: 14–8 (63.6%)
- Place: 3rd
- Playoff finish: Semifinals

Shell Rimula X seasons

The 1990 Formula Shell Zoom Masters season was the 6th season of the franchise in the Philippine Basketball Association (PBA). Formerly known as Formula Shell Zoom Masters in the First and All-Filipino Conference.

== Draft picks ==
Round	Pick	Player	Details
1	5	Richard Bognot	Signed
2	13	Aristotle Franco	Signed
3	20	Aurelio Gamit	Unsigned, free agent

== Notable dates ==
February 20: Three-time best import Bobby Parks won his first game as playing-coach of the team with Shell having an easy 126-105 victory over Presto Tivoli.

April 22: The Zoom Masters clinch the first finals seat of the Open Conference with their 13th win in 16 games, beating Presto Tivoli, 114-111.

October 28: Shell rolled to its seventh straight victory after an opening day blowout loss to Purefoods at the start of the Third Conference by routing Añejo Rum 65ers, 156-131.

November 18: Shell posted a 121-119 overtime victory over Alaska Milkmen for their third straight victory in the semifinals as they moved on top of the standings with 10 wins and three losses while Alaska dropped to second place at 10 wins and four defeats.

December 4: Shell eliminates Presto, 137-114, to set up a do-or-die game with Purefoods Hotdogs for the right to meet Alaska Milk in the Third Conference championship.

== First title ==
Formula Shell emerge with the best won-loss record in the first conference with 14 wins and four losses and will go up against the league's most popular team Añejo Rum 65 in the finals. The explosive and riotous championship series ended in a walkout by the 65ers in the second quarter of Game Six with Shell on top, 62-47, with 2:52 remaining. The Zoom Masters won their first-ever PBA title since joining the league in 1985 with a 4-2 series win.

== Occurrences ==
Assistant coach Arlene Rodriguez has taken over the coaching job from Bobby Parks during the First Conference finals following the protest by the Basketball coaches of the Philippines (BCOP) against hiring American coaches.

== Awards ==
- Bobby Parks won Best Import Honors in both the First and Third Conferences, he became the second import to have swept the award for the whole season since Billy Ray Bates in 1983.
- Ronnie Magsanoc was named Most Outstanding Player of the finals series in the First Conference. Magsanoc and Benjie Paras were chosen in the year-end awards for the Mythical first team selection.

== Roster ==
1990 Shell Rimula X roster
Players

Pos.	#	POB	Name	Height	Weight	DOB (YYYY–MM–DD)	From
G/F	2	(Philippines)	Jay Ramirez	6 ft 2 in (1.88 m)			Visayas
G	5	(Philippines)	Ronnie Magsanoc	5 ft 9 in (1.75 m)			UP Diliman
F	8	(Philippines)	Jing Ruiz	6 ft 2 in (1.88 m)			Letran
G	9	(Philippines)	Aris Franco	5 ft 11 in (1.80 m)			Lyceum
F	10	(Philippines)	Jojo Martin	6 ft 3 in (1.91 m)			NCBA
F	12	(Philippines)	Romeo Dela Rosa	6 ft 2 in (1.88 m)			Southwestern-U
G	13	(Philippines)	Leo Austria	5 ft 10 in (1.78 m)			Lyceum
C	14	(Philippines)	Benjie Paras	6 ft 5 in (1.96 m)			UP Diliman
C	19	(Philippines)	Eduardo Ducut	6 ft 5 in (1.96 m)			Letran
F	24	(Philippines)	Richard Bognot	6 ft 3 in (1.91 m)
F	32	(Philippines)	Primitivo Mutia	6 ft 3 in (1.91 m)			Southwestern-U
G	33	(Philippines)	Calvin Tuadles	5 ft 11 in (1.80 m)			Southwestern-U

Coaches

Head coach

- (United States) Bobby Parks
- (Philippines) Arlene Rodriguez

Assistant coach(es)

- (Philippines) Herc Callanta

Team manager

- (Philippines) Charlie Favis

Legend

- (C) Team captain
- Injured

== Transactions ==
=== Rookie free agents ===
Player	Signed	Former team
Joselito Martin	Off-season	N/A
Primitivo Mutia	Off-season	N/A

=== Subtractions ===
#	Player	Signed	New team
11	Arnie Tuadles	July 1990	Presto Tivolis

=== Recruited imports ===
Name	Conference	No.	Pos.	Ht.	College	Duration
Bobby Parks	First Conference; Third Conference	22	Forward	6"3'	Memphis State	February 20-May 15; September 30-December 13
Kevin Williams	Third Conference	7	Guard	6"2'	Saint John's	September 30 to December 13
