= 1990 Purefoods Hotdogs season =

- Head coach: Baby Dalupan
- General manager: Domingo Panganiban
- Owner: Ayala Corporation

First Conference results
- Record: 3–7 (30%)
- Place: 6th
- Playoff finish: Eliminated

All-Filipino Conference results
- Record: 16–9 (64%)
- Place: 2nd
- Playoff finish: Finals

Third Conference results
- Record: 15–9 (62.5%)
- Place: 1st
- Playoff finish: Finals

Purefoods Hotdogs seasons

The 1990 Purefoods Hotdogs season was the 3rd season of the franchise in the Philippine Basketball Association (PBA).

== Draft picks ==
Round	Pick	Player	Details
1	4	Gido Babilonia	Signed
1	7	Vernie Villarias	Traded to Pepsi for 1991 1st round pick
2	15	Carlito Mejos	Traded to Pepsi for 1991 2nd round pick
3	21	Louie Alas	Unsigned

== Occurrences ==
In the first conference, the Hotdogs played their last four games without an import when the team decided to release their reinforcement Dwayne Johnson after a 120–138 loss to winless Pop Cola on March 13. They lost all their remaining matches and were fined by the PBA.

Former imports Daren Queenan and Walker Russell, who both played last season with Añejo and Presto respectively, were the Hotdogs imports for the Third Conference. After eight games with Purefoods carrying a 5-win, 3-loss slate, the management and coaching staff decided to replace Walker Russell in favor of Robert Paul Rose.

== Notable dates ==
July 3: Purefoods upended a game Añejo Rum 65ers, 131–117, to moved up to second place behind unbeaten Presto Tivolis. Nelson Asaytono topscored for the Hotdogs with 29 points.

July 24: The Hotdogs hang on to scuttle Presto, 120–113, snapping the Tivolis' 10-game, unbeaten streak at the start of the semifinal round of the All-Filipino Conference. Dindo Pumaren fired the insurance basket from close range with 12 seconds remaining which gave the Hotdogs a safe 118–113 lead. Purefoods assumed solo second place with eight wins against three losses.

August 12: Purefoods makes a return trip to the All-Filipino finals and shoved Presto Tivolis at second place by scoring a 116–107 victory with Glenn Capacio hitting 31 points.

== 3rd straight All-Filipino runner-up finish ==
In the championship series against Presto Tivolis, the Hotdogs were slightly favored to end frustrations and win their first title, but the experience Presto lineup defied the odds by taking the crown in a seven-game series as Purefoods ended up bridesmaid for the fourth time.

== First title ==
In the Third Conference, Purefoods made it to the championship round against Alaska Milkmen. The Hotdogs finally won their first PBA title in three years of participation by coming back from a 0-2 overhaul to win the best-of-five finals series, three games to two, sweeping the last three games to become the second team to pull the feat since the famed Crispa Redmanizers in 1976. Coach Baby Dalupan won his 15th league title and the Hotdogs' main man Alvin Patrimonio was voted finals MVP.

== Roster ==
1990 Purefoods Hotdogs roster
Players

Pos.	#	POB	Name	Height	Weight	DOB (YYYY–MM–DD)	From
C	5	(Philippines)	Gido Babilonia	6 ft 6 in (1.98 m)			UST
G/F	6	(Philippines)	Jojo Lastimosa	6 ft 1 in (1.85 m)			USJ–R
G	77 & 7	(Philippines)	Arturo Cristobal	6 ft 1 in (1.85 m)			Far Eastern
G	8	(Philippines)	Al Solis	5 ft 11 in (1.80 m)			Visayas
G/F	9	(Philippines)	Naning Valenciano	6 ft 1 in (1.85 m)			USLS
G	10	(Philippines)	Dindo Pumaren	5 ft 9 in (1.75 m)			De La Salle
F	11	(Philippines)	Nelson Asaytono	6 ft 3 in (1.91 m)			Manila
G/F	12	(Philippines)	Glenn Capacio	6 ft 1 in (1.85 m)			Far Eastern
C	14	(Philippines)	Jack Tanuan	6 ft 6 in (1.98 m)			Far Eastern
G	15	(Philippines)	Bernie Fabiosa	5 ft 9 in (1.75 m)			UE
F	16	(Philippines)	Alvin Patrimonio	6 ft 3 in (1.91 m)			Mapúa
C	44	(Philippines)	Jerry Codinera	6 ft 5 in (1.96 m)			UE

Coaches

Head coach

- (Philippines) Baby Dalupan

Assistant coach(es)

- (Philippines) Ely Capacio
- (Philippines) Cris Calilan

Legend

- (C) Team captain
- Injured

== Transactions ==
=== Additions ===
Player	Signed	Former team
Arturo Cristobal	Off-season	Presto Tivoli
Bernie Fabiosa	Off-season	Presto Tivoli

=== Recruited imports ===
Name	Conference	No.	Pos.	Ht.	College	Duration
Dwayne Johnson	First Conference	25	Center-Forward	6"5'	Marquette University	February 18 to March 13
Daren Queenan	Third Conference	24	Forward	6"4'	Lehigh University	September 30 to December 20
Walker Russell	Third Conference	3	Guard	6"3'	Oakland Community College	September 30 to October 30
Robert Rose	Third Conference	33	Forward	6"5'	George Mason University	November 6 to December 20

== Win–loss record ==
Season Rank	GP	Win	Lost	Pct.
4th Overall	59	34	25	0.576
