= 1990 Sarsi Sizzlers season =

- Head coach: Yeng Guiao
- General Manager: Elmer Yanga
- Owner(s): RFM Corporation

First Conference results
- Record: 2–8 (20%)
- Place: 7th
- Playoff finish: N/A

All-Filipino Conference results
- Record: 1–9 (10%)
- Place: 8th
- Playoff finish: N/A

Third Conference results
- Record: 7–11 (38.9%)
- Place: 5th
- Playoff finish: Semifinals

Sarsi Sizzlers seasons

The 1990 Sarsi Sizzlers season was the 1st season of the franchise in the Philippine Basketball Association (PBA). Known as the Pop Cola Sizzlers in the First and All-Filipino Conference.

== Expansion pool ==
Pick #	Player	Former team
2	Elmer Reyes	San Miguel Beermen
4	Cayetano Salazar	Añejo Rum 65
6	Pido Jarencio	Purefoods Hotdogs
8	Sonny Cabatu	Purefoods Hotdogs
10	Fernando Garcia	Añejo Rum 65

== Draft picks ==
Round	Pick	Player	Details
1	2	Alejandro de Guzman	Signed
2	10	Napoleon Hatton	Signed
3	18	Edgar Macaraya	Unsigned
4	24	Ferdinand Santos	Unsigned

== New ballclub ==
RFM Corporation, which brought the Cosmos Bottling, Inc. was one of the two newcomers that joined the PBA as the league enters its 16th season. The team will be known as Pop Cola Sizzlers. Their first official game shown on TV took place in the RP-China goodwill series in the first week of February, featuring a Chinese Selection going up against PBA teams in exhibition games held at the Ninoy Aquino Stadium. Pop Cola paraded an import named Willie Glass and lost to the powerhouse Chinese quintet, 73-93. Glass was sent home before the season started.

The Sizzlers played All-Filipino in their opening game against fellow expansion team and softdrink rival Pepsi Cola when their choice for an import, Fennis Dembo, backed out at the last minute, Pop Cola lost to the Pepsi Hotshots, 130-149.

== Notable dates ==
March 13: Winless in five outings, Pop Cola finally scored their first victory in the pro league by beating Purefoods Hotdogs, 138-120.

June 10: Pop Cola scored a surprising 131-121 win over Alaska Milkmen at the start of the All-Filipino Conference.

October 2: Bannered by NBA veteran Lewis Lloyd, along with Michael Anderson as their imports. The Sizzlers defeated reigning All-Filipino Champion Presto Tivolis, 141-138, in their first game in the Third Conference.

November 6: Sarsi advances in the semifinal round with five wins and five loss record, defeating Purefoods Hotdogs, 148-143, as Lloyd and Anderson scored 59 and 56 points respectively for a combined 115-point output of the two imports.

November 13: The Sizzlers rallied to beat Alaska Milkmen, 123-120, in their second outing in the semifinals.

December 2: The Sarsi Sizzlers ended the year on a high note, denying corporate rival Purefoods Hotdogs a finals seat with a 138-131 victory.

== Roster ==
1990 Sarsi Sizzlers roster
Players

Pos.	#	POB	Name	Height	Weight	DOB (YYYY–MM–DD)	From
F	4	(Philippines)	Elmer Reyes	6 ft 1 in (1.85 m)			San Beda
C	5	(Philippines)	Sonny Cabatu	6 ft 5 in (1.96 m)			PSBA
G/F	6	(Philippines)	Ricardo Cui	6 ft 3 in (1.91 m)			Lyceum
G	7	(Philippines)	Marte Saldaña	5 ft 11 in (1.80 m)			Far Eastern
F	8	(Philippines)	Nandy Garcia	6 ft 2 in (1.88 m)			Adamson
C	11	(Philippines)	Joseph Pelaez	6 ft 5 in (1.96 m)			Manila
F	13	(Philippines)	Andy De Guzman	6 ft 2 in (1.88 m)			Far Eastern
G	14	(Philippines)	Joey Loyzaga	6 ft 1 in (1.85 m)			San Beda
G	16	(Philippines)	Leoncio Tan	6 ft 0 in (1.83 m)			De La Salle
F	17	(Philippines)	Terry Saldaña	6 ft 3 in (1.91 m)			Letran
F	18	(Philippines)	Nap Hatton	6 ft 1 in (1.85 m)			San Sebastian
C	19	(Philippines)	Cayetano Salazar	6 ft 5 in (1.96 m)			Letran
G	25	(Philippines)	Pido Jarencio	5 ft 10 in (1.78 m)			UST

Coaches

Head coach

- (Philippines) Yeng Guiao

Assistant coach(es)

- (Philippines) Rogelio Melencio

Legend

- (C) Team captain
- Injured

== Transactions ==
=== Additions ===
Name	Deal Information	Former team
Joey Loyzaga	Acquired via trade, originally chosen by Pepsi in the expansion pool	Anejo Rum 65
Joseph Pelaez	Rookie free agent	N/A
Anthony Poblador	Rookie free agent, placed on reserve list	N/A
Terry Saldaña	Comebacking player signed via free agency	N/A
Marte Saldaña	Signed via free agency	Presto Tivoli
Leoncio Tan, Jr	Rookie free agent	N/A

=== Recruited imports ===
Name	Conference	No.	Pos.	Ht.	College	Duration
Alfredrick Hughes	First Conference	21	Center-Forward	6"5'	Loyola University	February 22 to April 1
Lewis Lloyd	Third Conference	32	Center-Forward	6"5'	Drake University	October 2 to December 2
Michael Anderson	Third Conference	10	Guard	6"1'	Drexel University	October 2 to December 2
