= 1990 Presto Tivolis season =

- Head coach: Jimmy Mariano
- General manager: Ignacio Gotao
- Owner: CFC Corporation

First Conference results
- Record: 11–11 (50%)
- Place: 4th
- Playoff finish: Semifinals

All-Filipino Conference results
- Record: 18–8 (69.2%)
- Place: 1st
- Playoff finish: Finals

Third Conference results
- Record: 11–10 (52.4%)
- Place: 4th
- Playoff finish: Semifinals

Presto Tivolis seasons

The 1990 Presto Tivolis season was the 16th season of the franchise in the Philippine Basketball Association (PBA).

== Draft picks ==
Round	Pick	Player	Details
1	1	Peter Jao	Signed
2	9	Gerry Esplana	Signed
3	17	Joey Mendoza	Unsigned, free agent
4	23	Ruel Papa	Unsigned, free agent

== Notable dates ==
March 25: Presto import Winston Crite recorded a conference-high 10 shot blocks aside from 35 points and 19 rebounds in a triple-double showing as the Tivolis ousted the importless-Purefoods Hotdogs, 113-107.

April 1: Allan Caidic set a conference-high 46 points for the locals as Presto ended their elimination round assignments with their fifth straight win, a 115-113 victory over San Miguel, as they finished with a 7-3 won-loss slate, just a game behind leaders Anejo and Shell.

April 17: The Tivolis snapped the eight-game winning streak of Añejo Rum with a 115–113 victory as import Winston Crite scored 56 points. Presto improved to nine wins and five losses as they split their first four games in the first round of the semifinals.

June 12: Allan Caidic scored 40 points as the Tivolis defeated Pepsi Hotshots in their first game in the All-Filipino, 113–95.

June 24: The Tivolis scored the last seven points as they remained unbeaten with their fourth win in a 115-112 victory over Purefoods Hotdogs.

July 8: Allan Caidic scored a conference-high 57 points as Presto rolled to its seventh straight win, defeating Alaska, 134-128.

July 22: Presto completed a 10-game sweep in the elimination round as the Tivolis repeated over San Miguel Beermen, 130-119 in overtime.

July 31: Allan Caidic poured in 47 points as Presto hacked out a 131-128 win over skidding Anejo Rum after trailing by as much as 18 points in the third period. The Tivolis keep its lead with a 12-win, 2-loss slate after the first round of the semifinals in the All-Filipino Conference.

== Championship ==
Presto acquired Arnie Tuadles at the start of the semifinal round of the All-Filipino Conference after a contract dispute with his former team Shell. Tuadles is now on his third stint with the CFC ballclub. The Tivolis' unbeaten streak was halted by Purefoods in their first outing in the semis and they lost their next game to San Miguel for a two-game losing skid. Presto won their next three matches for its 13th win but lost the last three of their semifinal assignments and were forced into a sudden-death playoff for the second finals berth with either San Miguel Beer or Añejo Rum 65 after losing to the Purefoods Hotdogs, 107–116, which nailed the first finals seat on August 12. The Tivolis finally made it to the championship series by nipping San Miguel, 117-115, in a knockout game a week later on August 19.

The best-of-seven finals between Presto Tivolis and Purefoods Hotdogs went into a deciding seventh game, Arnie Tuadles filled in the shoes for the injured Allan Caidic in the winner-take-all Game Seven by scoring 33 points as Presto won by a big margin, 115-96.

Presto Tivolis won their fourth All-Filipino title and sixth crown overall. Coach Jimmy Mariano won his first title while Arnie Tuadles become the first player to win two championships with two different teams in one season.

== Awards ==
- Allan Caidic won the Most Valuable Player (MVP) Award, the triggerman also emerged scoring champion for the fourth straight season, averaging 26.6 points per game in 65 appearances during the season.
- Gerald Esplana won the Rookie of the Year (ROY) Honors.
- Arnie Tuadles was awarded by the Sports and Columnist Organization of the Philippines (SCOOP) as the Most Outstanding Player of the All-Filipino finals series.

== Roster ==
Presto Tivolis roster
Players
Coaches

Pos.	No.	Nat.	Name	Ht.	Wt.
C	1	(Philippines)	Manny Victorino	6 ft 5 in (1.96 m)		José Rizal
G/F	5	(Philippines)	Peter Jao	6 ft 0 in (1.83 m)		USJ–R
F/C	6	(Philippines)	Abe King	6 ft 3 in (1.91 m)		San Beda
F	8	(Philippines)	Allan Caidic	6 ft 2 in (1.88 m)		UE
G	9	(Philippines)	Onchie Dela Cruz	5 ft 11 in (1.80 m)		Philippine Christian
F	11	(Philippines)	Arnie Tuadles	6 ft 2 in (1.88 m)		Visayas
G	14	(Philippines)	Gerry Esplana	5 ft 9 in (1.75 m)		Far Eastern
C	15	(Philippines)	Hernani Demigillo	6 ft 5 in (1.96 m)		San Sebastian
G/F	17	(Philippines)	Padim Israel	6 ft 2 in (1.88 m)		Ateneo
C	28	(Philippines)	Zaldy Realubit	6 ft 5 in (1.96 m)		USJ–R
F	29	(Philippines)	Bernardo Carpio	6 ft 3 in (1.91 m)		Ateneo
G	42	(Philippines)	Willie Generalao	5 ft 8 in (1.73 m)		Visayas
F	71	(Philippines)	Manuel Marquez	6 ft 2 in (1.88 m)		San Beda

Head coach

- (Philippines) Jimmy Mariano

Assistant coach(es)

- (Philippines) Adriano "Bong" Go
- (Philippines) Nap Flores

Team manager

- (Philippines) Ignacio Gotao

Legend

- (C) Team captain
- Injured

== Transactions ==
=== Mid-season acquisition ===
Player	Signed	Details
Arnie Tuadles	July 23, 1990	Reacquired following a contract dispute with previous team Formula Shell

=== Recruited imports ===
Name	Conference	No.	Pos.	Ht.	College	Duration
Winston Crite	First Conference; Third Conference	31	Center-Forward	6"5'	Texas A&M University	February 20-May 10; October 2-December 13
Everette Stephens	Third Conference	21	Guard	6"1'	Purdue University	October 2-4
Ennis Whatley	Third Conference	3	Guard-Forward	6"1'	University of Alabama	October 9 to December 13
