= 1990 Pepsi Hotshots season =

- Head coach: Edgardo Ocampo; Derrick Pumaren
- General manager: Steve Watson
- Owner: Pepsi Philippines

First Conference results
- Record: 1–9 (10%)
- Place: 8th
- Playoff finish: N/A

All-Filipino Conference results
- Record: 1–9 (10%)
- Place: 7th
- Playoff finish: N/A

Third Conference results
- Record: 0–10 (0%)
- Place: 8th
- Playoff finish: N/A

Pepsi Hotshots seasons

The 1990 Pepsi Hotshots season was the 1st season of the franchise in the Philippine Basketball Association (PBA).

== Expansion pool ==
Pick #	Player	Former team
1	Tonichi Yturri	San Miguel Beermen
3	Jeffrey Graves	San Miguel Beermen
5	Ricky Relosa	Alaska Milkmen
7	Joey Loyzaga (Traded to Pop Cola)	Añejo Rum 65
9	Harmon Codiñera	Añejo Rum 65
11	Alejo Alolor	Purefoods Hotdogs

^{Pepsi won the toss over Pop Cola to pick first, both teams took turns in choosing players}

== Draft picks ==
Round	Pick	Player	Details
1	3	Gilbert Reyes Jr	Signed
2	11	Cadel Mosqueda	Signed

== New ballclub ==
Newcomer Pepsi Cola had a forgettable campaign in their first year of participation in the PBA. The Hotshots finished with a lowly 2–28 record with two wins coming at the hands of fellow expansion team Pop Cola.

The Hotshots scored their first win in the opening game of the season on February 18 with a rousing 149–130 victory over importless Pop Cola Sizzlers. Pepsi Import Derrick Hamilton scored 77 big points. They lost the rest of their nine outings in the first conference and their first six matches in the All-Filipino. On July 3, the Hotshots finally broke the long slump of a 15-game losing streak with a come-from-behind 117–111 win over Pop Cola.

Former Hills Bros. import Jose Slaughter came back in the Third Conference to replace Alyun Taylor, who was only good for two games. Slaughter teamed up with Jeff Hodge and the Hotshots failed to score a single victory and were shut out in 10 games in the eliminations.

== Occurrences ==
San Miguel assistant coach Derrick Pumaren accepted the offer to coach the Pepsi Hotshots, replacing Ed Ocampo at the start of the Third Conference. The Hotshots acquired veteran center Abet Guidaben, who was traded by Alaska in exchange for Harmon Codiñera.

== Roster ==
1990 Pepsi Hotshots roster
Players

Pos.	#	POB	Name	Height	Weight	DOB (YYYY–MM–DD)	From
G/F	2	(Philippines)	Alejo Alolor	6 ft 1 in (1.85 m)			Visayas
G	5	(Philippines)	Gilbert Reyes	5 ft 8 in (1.73 m)			Ateneo
F/C	7	(Philippines)	Ricky Relosa	6 ft 3 in (1.91 m)			Mapúa
G	8	(Philippines)	Rey Yncierto	6 ft 0 in (1.83 m)			Cebu
G	10	(Philippines)	Carlito Mejos	5 ft 11 in (1.80 m)			Visayas
C	11	(Philippines)	Tonichi Yturri	6 ft 5 in (1.96 m)			De La Salle
F/C	12	(Philippines)	Cadel Mosqueda	6 ft 3 in (1.91 m)			Arellano
G	14	(Philippines)	Vernie Villarias	6 ft 1 in (1.85 m)			UE
F	15	(Philippines)	Salvador Ramos	6 ft 3 in (1.91 m)			Letran
F	17	(Philippines)	Jeffrey Graves	6 ft 3 in (1.91 m)			Angeles
C	23	(Philippines)	Abet Guidaben	6 ft 5 in (1.96 m)			USJ–R
F	30	(Philippines)	Dennis Abbatuan	6 ft 2 in (1.88 m)			José Rizal
G/F	32	(Philippines)	Tim Coloso	6 ft 2 in (1.88 m)			Letran

Coaches

Head coach

- (Philippines) Edgardo Ocampo
- (Philippines) Derrick Pumaren

Assistant coach(es)

- (Philippines) Bobby Littaua
- (Philippines) Gabby Velasco

Legend

- (C) Team captain
- Injured

== Transactions ==
=== Additions ===
Name	Deal Information	Former team
Dennis Abbatuan	Signed via free agency	Presto Tivoli
Carlito Mejos	Draft Rights acquired from Purefoods in exchange for 1991 first-round pick	N/A
Salvador Ramos	Rookie free agent	N/A
Vernie Villarias	Draft Rights acquired from Purefoods in exchange for 1991 second-round pick	N/A
Rey Yncierto	Rookie free agent	N/A

=== Trades ===
September 1990	To Alaska Harmon Codinera	To Pepsi Abet Guidaben

=== Recruited imports ===
Name	Conference	No.	Pos.	Ht.	College	Duration
Derrick Hamilton	First Conference	3	Center-Forward	6"5'	Southern Mississippi	February 18 to March 29
Jeff Hodge	Third Conference	3	Guard	6"3'	South Alabama	September 30 to November 8
Alyun Taylor	Third Conference	21	Forward	6"1'		September 30 to October 4
Jose Slaughter	Third Conference	21	Forward-Guard	6"3'	University of Portland	October 9 to November 8
