= Grand Slam (Philippines) =

Achievement in Philippine sports leagues

In Philippine sports leagues, a Grand Slam is the achievement of a team winning all three conferences (or tournaments) in a single season. The term originated in the Philippine Basketball Association (PBA), as a traditional season is composed of three separate conferences rather than a single regular season and postseason. The term has since expanded into other leagues such as the Premier Volleyball League (PVL) and the now-defunct Philippine Basketball League (PBL).

== Philippine Basketball Association ==
From 1975 to 2003, and again from 2010 onwards, a traditional Philippine Basketball Association season is composed of three conferences. Currently, these three are the Philippine Cup, Commissioner's Cup, and Governors' Cup.

In certain circumstances, the PBA may hold less than three conferences in a season. To pave the way for the Philippines' hosting of the 1981 SEA Games and 2023 FIBA Basketball World Cup, two conferences were held in the 1981 and 2023–24 seasons. Due to restrictions during the COVID-19 pandemic, the 2020 season was reduced from three conferences to one while only two were held for the following 2021 season.

From 2004 to 2009, the league switched to a two-conference format consisting of the Philippine Cup and the import-laden Fiesta Conference. A Grand Slam can still be achieved by winning both titles but this was never done.

As of 2024, the PBA Grand Slam has been accomplished five times by four teams and four coaches since the league's inception in 1975. The Crispa Redmanizers are the only team to win two Grand Slams while Tim Cone is the only coach to win two, doing so with the Alaska Milkmen and San Mig Super Coffee Mixers in 1996 and 2014, respectively.

=== Winners ===
| Season | Team | Coach | Defeated finalists | | | Season record | Ref. |
| Season | Team | Coach | First | Second | Third | Season record | Ref. |
|---|---|---|---|---|---|---|---|
| 1976 | Crispa Redmanizers | Baby Dalupan | Toyota | Toyota | Toyota | 47–15 (75.8%) | |
| 1983 | Crispa Redmanizers | Tommy Manotoc | Gilbey's | Great Taste | Great Taste | 46–16 (74.2%) | |
| 1989 | San Miguel Beermen | Norman Black | Shell | Purefoods | Añejo | 50–21 (70.4%) | |
| 1996 | Alaska Milkmen | Tim Cone | Purefoods | Shell | Ginebra | 51–21 (70.8%) | |
| 2013–14 | San Mig Super Coffee Mixers | Tim Cone | Rain or Shine | Talk 'N Text | Rain or Shine | 41–30 (57.7%) | |

==== 1976 Crispa Redmanizers ====
In the league's second season, the Crispa Redmanizers became the first team to win all of the conference championships in a single season. Before the start of the 1976 season, they had won the All-Philippine Championship, the third conference of the PBA's maiden season. The Redmanizers won all of the 1976 season conferences—the All-Filipino (reclassified as the First Conference in 2010), the Open (reclassified as the Second Conference), and the All-Philippine Championship—with an overall season record of 47–15. All of their championships were won against the Toyota Comets, who have been the Crispa Redmanizers' rivals since both teams played in MICAA. The Crispa Redmanizers' team was composed of future Hall of Famers Bogs Adornado, Atoy Co, Abet Guidaben, and Philip Cezar, and was coached by Baby Dalupan.

==== 1983 Crispa Redmanizers ====
Crispa Redmanizers achieved the Grand Slam again in the 1983 season. The team still comprised many of the same players as the 1976 Grand Slam team, but they were now coached by former U/Tex Wranglers tactician Tommy Manotoc. Crispa began the season by winning 12 consecutive games in the All-Filipino Conference, losing only their first game to Toyota in the start of the group stage. They finished the group stage with a 7–1 record, then won all of their playoff games, including their best-of-five series against Gilbey's Gin Tonics. The team's winning streak continued into the next conference, the Reinforced Filipino Conference, as Crispa won their first nine games in the group stage and ended their streak with 21 wins. Also this conference, they hired former Portland Trail Blazer player Billy Ray Bates as their import. Crispa Redmanizers have won the conference championship against former Redmanizer Bogs Adornado and the Great Taste Coffee Makers by three games to two.

In the Open Conference, the final conference of the season, the Redmanizers again hired Bates as their import. They entered the finals against Great Taste. The Redmanizers again defeated the Coffee Makers in their best-of-five finals series. Bates won Best Import of the Conference awards for the Reinforced Filipino and Open Conferences. Abet Guidaben won the Most Valuable Player award at the end of the season.

==== 1989 San Miguel Beermen ====
The San Miguel Beermen won the 1988 PBA Reinforced Conference championship before winning the 1989 Grand Slam. The San Miguel team formed the core of the Northern Consolidated Cement team, which represented the Philippines in international tournaments. The NCC team also captured the 1985 PBA Reinforced Conference championship as a guest team. The players formerly of the NCC team were Hector Calma, Yves Dignadice, Samboy Lim, and Elmer Reyes. The team was coached by Norman Black, who twice won the best importee award. The San Miguel Beermen also acquired former Purefoods Hotdogs center and playing coach Ramon Fernandez, controversially trading him for Abet Guidaben with the Hotdogs.

With import Michael Phelps, San Miguel won the Open Conference—the first conference championship of the season—against Formula Shell Zoom Masters led by Bobby Parks. The Beermen struggled in the group stage of the All-Filipino Conference but went into the final against Purefoods Hotdogs and won the championship series in six games. In the final conference of the season, the Reinforced Conference, the Beermen performed poorly in the group stage and won most of their games in the semifinal round. They advanced to the finals against sister team Añejo Rum 65ers. They have won their best-of-seven series against the 65ers in five games.

==== 1996 Alaska Milkmen ====
The Alaska Milkmen won the Governors' Cup, the championship of the third conference of the 1995 season. The team comprised Johnny Abarrientos, Jojo Lastimosa, Bong Hawkins, and Jeffrey Cariaso. They were coached by Tim Cone, who was the first coach to implement the Triangle Offense system in the PBA.

In the first conference of the 1996 season, the All-Filipino Cup, the Milkmen played the Purefoods TJ Hotdogs in the best-of-seven finals. In Game 5 of the championship series, Purefoods forced the game into overtime and held a one-point lead against Alaska, 92–91, with 10.3 seconds remaining. In the next play, Alaska was inbounding from their baseline behind the basket. Jeffrey Cariaso caught the ball in an alley-oop attempt but was fouled by Bong Ravena while trying to block the shot with 0.6 seconds left. Cariaso sank both of his free throws and gave Alaska the lead, 93–92. With no timeouts left, the TJ Hotdogs threw a desperate attempt from the opposite side of their basket and missed, giving the Milkmen the All-Filipino championship.

In the second conference, the Commissioner's Cup, the Milkmen hired Derrick Hamilton as their import for the tournament. After the league found out about Hamilton's marijuana use, the Milkmen hired their resident import Sean Chambers to replace Hamilton. The Milkmen played against the Formula Shell Zoom Masters in the finals and won the championship in seven games. In the third and final conference of the season, the Governors' Cup, the Milkmen played Barangay Ginebra San Miguel. The Milkmen won their series against the Gin Kings in five games. Johnny Abarrientos won the MVP award at the end of the season.

==== 2013–14 San Mig Super Coffee Mixers ====
In 2011, the former Alaska coach Tim Cone took over the coaching duties of the B-Meg Llamados team—later renamed the San Mig Super Coffee Mixers. The team's core comprised twice-league MVP James Yap, Marc Pingris, and PJ Simon.

In the first conference of the 2013–14 season, the Philippine Cup, the Coffee Mixers performed poorly in their first games of the tournament and were ranked in fifth place at the end of the group stage. They faced arch-rivals Barangay Ginebra San Miguel in the semifinals and won their series in seven games. They beat the Rain or Shine Elasto Painters in the finals and won the championship by four games to two.

In the Commissioner's Cup, the Coffee Mixers hired James Mays as their reinforcement for the tournament. Still struggling in the regular conference, the Coffee Mixers finished in sixth place with a 4–5 record. The team played the defending champions Alaska Milkmen in a best-of-three quarterfinal series. Alaska Milkmen won the first game 86–77, and were on verge of eliminating the Coffee Mixers. The Coffee Mixers won the next two games to advance to the semifinal round against Air21 Express, an unexpected semifinalist who had eliminated the second-seeded San Miguel Beermen, who had twice-to-beat advantage (equivalent to a 1–0 lead in a best-of-three series). Air21 Express, led by Asi Taulava, won the first game against the Mixers, 103–100. The Coffee Mixers won the next two games; they took the series lead and were one win away from a place in the finals. Air21 Express scored 94 points in Game 4 and forced a rubber match. Game 5 was won by the Coffee Mixers 99–83. In the finals, they faced the Talk 'N Text Tropang Texters, who had a 13–0 record before the start of their championship series. The Coffee Mixers won the first game of the series. Talk 'N Text won Game 2 of the finals but the Coffee Mixers won the next two games and their third consecutive championship.

In the Governors' Cup, the Coffee Mixers hired their import Marqus Blakely as their reinforcement for the tournament. The team finished the group stage with a 5–4 record and tied with Alaska, San Miguel, Barangay Ginebra, and Air21 in third place. Because of the quotient system imposed for tiebreakers in this conference, the Coffee Mixers were in fourth place, having the second-best quotient among the five teams. The Coffee Mixers defeated fifth-seeded San Miguel Beermen in the quarterfinals in one game (SMC had a twice-to-beat advantage), 97–90. The Coffee Mixers advanced to the semifinal round, where they played their Commissioner's Cup finals opponent the Talk 'N Text Tropang Texters. The Coffee Mixers won the first two games of their best-of-five series, giving them a lead to close the series and eliminate Talk 'N Text. However, the Tropang Texters won games 3 and 4, forcing a deciding Game 5. The deciding Game 5 was very close and no team led their opponent for more than seven points in the first three quarters. In the fourth quarter, the free-throw shooting problems and missed attempts in Talk 'N Text's paint allowed Coffee Mixers win the game and secure a place in the finals. They played their Philippine Cup opponents, Rain or Shine. The Coffee Mixers won the series and the Grand Slam after five games.

=== Failed bids ===
The following teams won the championship in the first two conferences of the season but missed out in the third and final conference.

- 1975 Toyota Tamaraws (lost to Crispa in the All-Philippine Championship finals)
- 1977 Crispa Redmanizers (missed finals berth in the Invitational Conference)
- 1985 Great Taste Coffee Makers (missed finals berth in the Reinforced Conference)
- 1986 Tanduay Rhum Masters (missed finals berth in the Open Conference)
- 1995 Sunkist Orange Juicers (missed finals berth in the Governors' Cup)
- 1998 Alaska Milkmen (missed finals berth in the Governors' Cup)
- 2010–11 Talk 'N Text Tropang Texters (lost to Petron in the Governors' Cup finals)
- 2016–17 San Miguel Beermen (missed finals berth in the Governors' Cup)
- 2019 San Miguel Beermen (missed finals berth in the Governors' Cup)
- 2024–25 TNT Tropang 5G (lost to San Miguel in the Philippine Cup finals)

==== At least three consecutive championships ====
The following teams won at least three consecutive championships across two seasons, but neither included a Grand Slam.

- 1984–1985 Great Taste Coffee Makers (four straight championships: 1984 Second All-Filipino Conference, 1984 Invitational Championship, 1985 Open Conference, 1985 All-Filipino Conference)
- 1997–1998 Alaska Milkmen (three straight championships: 1997 Governors' Cup, 1998 All-Filipino Cup and 1998 PBA Commissioner's Cup)
- 2000–2001 San Miguel Beermen (three straight championships: 2000 Commissioner's Cup, 2000 Governors' Cup, 2001 All-Filipino Cup)

=== PBA 3x3 ===
In the PBA 3x3, this feat only occurred once when the TNT Tropang Giga (later known as the TNT Triple Giga) won all three conferences of the 2022–23 season. The team was also one conference away from achieving back-to-back Grand Slams at the end of the 2023–24 season, but lost to the Meralco Bolts in the finals of the Third Conference.

== Philippine Basketball League ==
In the defunct Philippine Basketball League (PBL), a Grand Slam could be won because the amateur league also has a three-conference format similar to that of the PBA. The Stag Pale Pilseners led by future Barangay Ginebra San Miguel players Marlou Aquino and Bal David won the PBL version of the Grand Slam in the league's 1995–96 season, coached by Alfrancis Chua the Stags dominated the said Season.

By 2001, the PBL only had two conferences in a season. This means winning a grand slam encompasses an adjoining season. The Harbour Centre Batang Pier won seven consecutive titles from 2005 to 2009, a grand slam encompassing 4 seasons.

=== Winners ===
| Season/s | Team | Coach | Defeated finalists | | |
| Season/s | Team | Coach | First | Second | Third |
|---|---|---|---|---|---|
| 1995–96 | Stag Pale Pilseners | Alfrancis Chua | Red Bull | Casino | Red Bull |
| 1997–98 | Tanduay Gold Rhum | Alfrancis Chua | Dazz | Agfa | Red Bull |
| 1999–2000 to 2000–01 | Welcoat House Paints | Junel Baculi | Red Bull | ANA | Shark |
| 2005–06 to 2006–07 | Harbour Centre Port Masters/Batang Pier | Jorge Gallent | Toyota Otis | Hapee | Cebuana Lhuillier |
| 2007–08 to 2008–09 | Harbour Centre Port Masters/Batang Pier | Jorge Gallent | Hapee | Hapee | Magnolia |

== Premier Volleyball League ==
With the exception of the 2021, 2024–25, and 2025–26 seasons, a Premier Volleyball League season has always had three conferences, but from 2017 to 2019, the league held the Collegiate Conference which was reserved for collegiate teams, thus a Grand Slam cannot be done at the time.

After the league turned pro, the Collegiate Conference was replaced by the Invitational Conference, which was first introduced in the 2022 season. Since member clubs could participate in the Invitational Conference, this made a Grand Slam in the PVL possible. Since then, a traditional PVL season comprises the All-Filipino Conference, Reinforced Conference, and Invitational Conference.

=== Winners ===
| Season | Team | Coach | Defeated finalists | | |
| Season | Team | Coach | First | Second | Third |
|---|---|---|---|---|---|
| 2024 | Creamline Cool Smashers | Sherwin Meneses | Choco Mucho | Akari | Cignal |

==== 2024–25 Creamline Cool Smashers ====
Despite the 2024–25 PVL season having four conferences, the league didn't clarify the extension to the season until January 2026. Since the Creamline Cool Smashers won all three conferences in 2024 and the old calendar used until 2023 ran through a full calendar year, they are considered by multiple publications to have achieved the first PVL Grand Slam. The team included players such as Michele Gumabao, Bernadeth Pons, Jema Galanza, Jeanette Panaga, and Tots Carlos among others.

In the 2024 All-Filipino Conference, the top four teams would advance to the final round. Creamline were tied with the PLDT High Speed Hitters in match wins for the fourth-place spot, and clinched the final berth with a lead in match points (24–23). In the championship, the team were matched against sister team Choco Mucho Flying Titans, who they swept in two games to win the first conference title of the season.

In the Reinforced Conference, the team won eight of their ten games during the first two rounds, enough to rank Creamline third place overall and advance to the final round. In the semifinal match, the Cool Smashers faced the Cignal HD Spikers. After the first two sets, Creamline were down 0–2 but miraculously completed a reverse sweep to defeat Cignal in five sets and advance to the championship against the Akari Chargers. They defeated Akari in straight sets to win the second conference title of the season.

By reaching the semifinals of the Reinforced Conference, the team qualified and participated in the 2024 Invitational Conference. The team went undefeated in the preliminary round before once again facing off against Cignal for the championship. Creamline were once again trailing, going 1–2 after three sets, but went on to win the next two sets to accomplish the first Grand Slam in Premier Volleyball League history.

=== Failed bids ===
The following teams won the championship in the first two conferences of the season but missed out in the third and final conference.

- 2022 Creamline Cool Smashers (missed championship berth in the Reinforced Conference)

=== Golden Double ===
From 2017 to 2019, while the Collegiate Conference was active, the feat of winning two conferences in a season was known as the Golden Double. This feat was only done twice across both the women's and men's divisions. The Cignal HD Spikers won the first Golden Double in either division and the only one in the men's division while Creamline won the other Golden Double in the women's division.

==== Winners ====
| Season | Division | Team | Coach | Defeated finalists | |
| Season | Division | Team | Coach | First | Second |
|---|---|---|---|---|---|
| 2017 | Men's | Cignal HD Spikers | Oliver Almadro | Air Force | Megabuilders |
| 2018 | Women's | Creamline Cool Smashers | Anusorn Bundit | PayMaya | Ateneo–Motolite |

== See also ==
- List of Philippine Basketball Association champions
- List of Philippine Basketball League champions
- List of Premier Volleyball League champion teams
