= 1989 PBA All-Filipino Conference =

- Duration: June 18 – September 3, 1989
- TV partner(s): Vintage Sports (PTV)

Finals
- Champions: San Miguel Beermen
- Runners-up: Purefoods Hotdogs

PBA All-Filipino Conference chronology
- < 1988 1990 >

PBA conference chronology
- < 1989 Open 1989 Reinforced >

The 1989 Philippine Basketball Association (PBA) All-Filipino Conference (also known as the 1989 PBA Fiesta All-Filipino Conference) was the second conference of the 1989 PBA season. It started on June 18 and ended on September 3, 1989. The tournament is an All-Filipino format, which doesn't require an import or a pure-foreign player for each team.

The Philippine national team, bound for SEA Games and ABC championships, participated as guest team, playing only in the first round of the eliminations and went winless in all their six games against PBA ballclubs.

== Format ==
The following format will be observed for the duration of the conference:

- Double-round robin eliminations; 11 games per team; Teams are then seeded by basis on win–loss records.
- Teams with the worst record after the elimination round will be eliminated.
- Semifinals will be two round robin affairs with the five remaining teams. Results from the elimination round will be carried over.
- The top two teams in the semifinals advance to the best-of-seven finals. The last two teams dispute the third-place trophy in a best-of-five playoff.

== Elimination round ==
Pos	Team	W	L	PCT	GB	Qualification
1	Purefoods Hotdogs	9	2	.818	—	Semifinal round
2	San Miguel Beermen	8	3	.727	1	Semifinal round
3	Formula Shell Zoom Masters	6	5	.545	3	Semifinal round
4	Añejo Rum 65ers	6	5	.545	3	Semifinal round
5	Alaska Milkmen	5	6	.455	4	Semifinal round
6	Presto Ice Cream	2	9	.182	7	
—	Team Philippines (Note: Team Philippines could only participate in the first round robin of games, and all results counted in the standings for their opponents; the team cannot participate in the semifinals.) (G)	0	6	.000	6.5	

(G) Guests

== Semifinal round ==
Overall standings
Pos	Team	W	L	PCT	GB	Qualification
1	Purefoods Hotdogs	14	5	.737	—	Advance to the Finals
2	San Miguel Beermen	12	7	.632	2	Advance to the Finals
3	Añejo Rum 65ers	10	9	.526 (Note: Head-to-head record: Añejo 2–2 Shell, Añejo +5)	4	Proceed to third place playoffs
4	Formula Shell Zoom Masters	10	9	.526	4	Proceed to third place playoffs
5	Alaska Milkmen	8	11	.421	6	

Notes:

Semifinal round standings
Pos	Team	W	L
1	Purefoods Hotdogs	5	3
2	San Miguel Beermen	4	4
3	Añejo Rum 65ers	4	4
4	Formula Shell Zoom Masters	4	4
5	Alaska Milkmen	3	5

== Third place playoffs ==
Vintage

August 22

Añejo Rum 65ers 121, Formula Shell Zoom Masters 114
Scoring by quarter: 19–27, 23–32, 41–32, 31–30
Pts: Rey Cuenco 32	Pts: Benjie Paras 26

The ULTRA, Pasig

Vintage

August 24

Añejo Rum 65ers 107, Formula Shell Zoom Masters 121
Scoring by quarter: 29–22, 31–21, 31–35, 30–29
Pts: Rudy Distrito 23	Pts: Calvin Tuadles 27

The ULTRA, Pasig

Vintage

August 27

Añejo Rum 65ers 138, Formula Shell Zoom Masters 128
Scoring by quarter: 29–32, 33–34, 29–34, 37–38
Pts: Rey Cuenco 27	Pts: Arnie Tuadles 32

The ULTRA, Pasig

Vintage

August 29

Añejo Rum 65ers 120, Formula Shell Zoom Masters 124

The ULTRA, Pasig

Vintage

August 31

Añejo Rum 65ers 114, Formula Shell Zoom Masters 116
Shell wins series, 3–2

The ULTRA, Pasig

== Finals ==
Vintage

August 22

Purefoods Hotdogs 120, San Miguel Beermen 112

The ULTRA, Pasig

Vintage

August 24

Purefoods Hotdogs 111, San Miguel Beermen 119

The ULTRA, Pasig

Vintage

August 27

Purefoods Hotdogs 109, San Miguel Beermen 122

The ULTRA, Pasig

Vintage

August 29

Purefoods Hotdogs 113, San Miguel Beermen 119

The ULTRA, Pasig

Vintage

August 31

Purefoods Hotdogs 142, San Miguel Beermen 136 (OT)

The ULTRA, Pasig

Vintage

September 3

Purefoods Hotdogs 109, San Miguel Beermen 128
San Miguel wins series, 4–2

The ULTRA, Pasig
