= Keith Smart =

American basketball player and coach

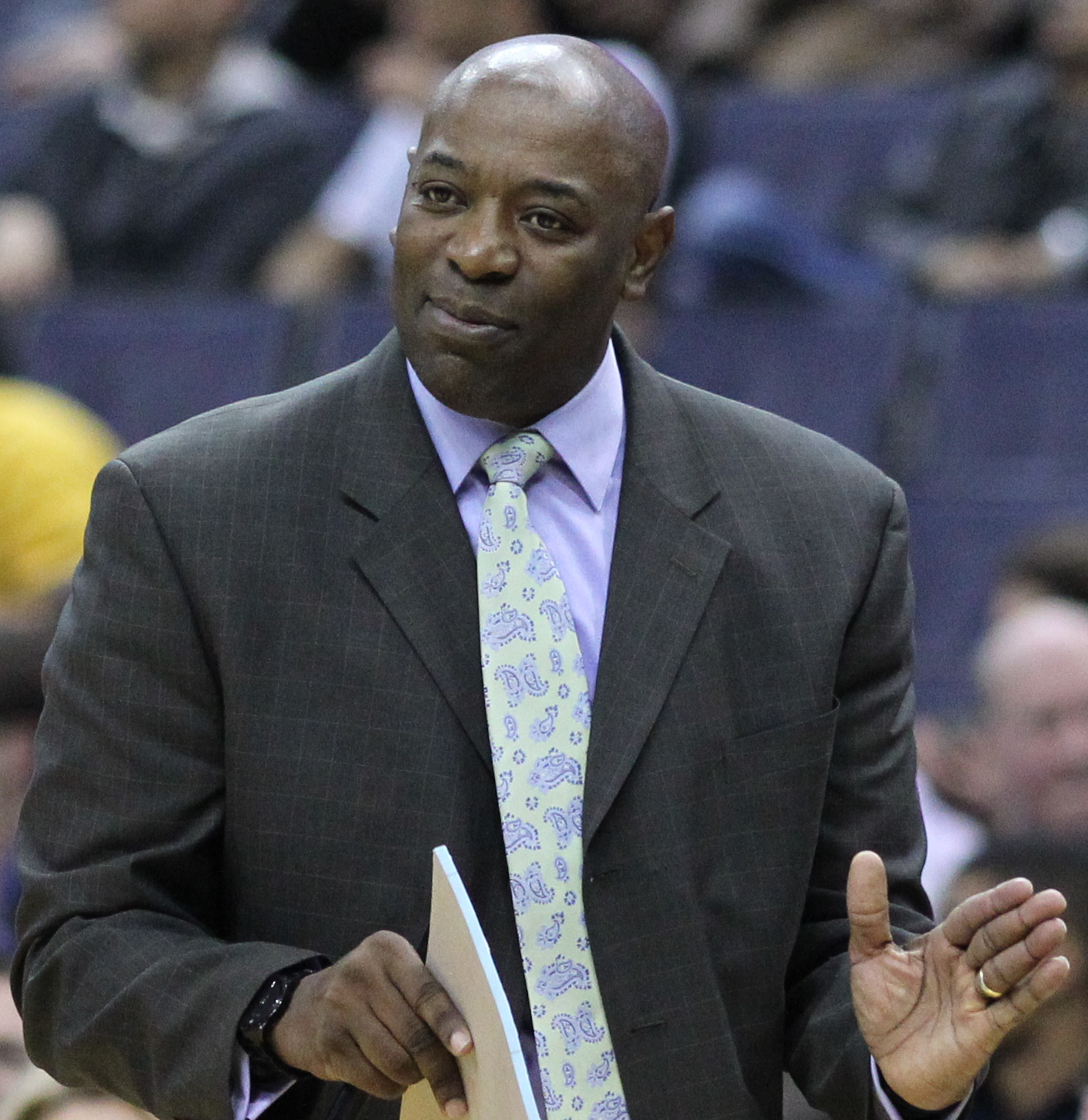
- Smart as head coach of the Golden State Warriors in 2011

Personal information
- Born: September 21, 1964 (age 62) Baton Rouge, Louisiana, U.S.
- Listed height: 6 ft 1 in (1.85 m)
- Listed weight: 175 lb (79 kg)

Career information
- High school: McKinley (Baton Rouge, Louisiana)
- College: Garden City CC (1984–1986); Indiana (1986–1988)
- NBA draft: 1988: 2nd round, 41st overall pick
- Drafted by: Golden State Warriors
- Playing career: 1988–1997
- Position: Point guard
- Number: 3
- Coaching career: 1997–2024

Career history

Playing
- 1988: San Antonio Spurs
- 1989: San Miguel Beermen
- 1989: Worcester Counts
- 1990: Youngstown Pride
- 1991: Halifax Windjammers
- 1993: Bravo de Lara
- 1994: Cambrais Basket
- 1995: Trotamundos de Carabobo
- 1995–1996: Florida Beachdogs
- 1996–1997: Fort Wayne Fury

Coaching
- 1997–2000: Fort Wayne Fury
- 2000–2003: Cleveland Cavaliers (assistant)
- 2003: Cleveland Cavaliers
- 2003–2010: Golden State Warriors (assistant)
- 2010–2011: Golden State Warriors
- 2011–2012: Sacramento Kings (assistant)
- 2011–2013: Sacramento Kings
- 2014–2016: Miami Heat (assistant)
- 2016–2018: Memphis Grizzlies (assistant)
- 2018–2019: New York Knicks (assistant)
- 2021–2024: Arkansas (assistant)

Career highlights
- As player: WBL champion (1990); NCAA champion (1987); NCAA final Four Most Outstanding Player (1987)
- Stats at NBA.com
- Stats at Basketball Reference
Medals
Men's basketball
Representing United States
Pan American Games
Silver medal – second place	1987 Indianapolis	Team competition

Jonathan Keith Smart (born September 21, 1964) is an American former basketball coach and player.

== Playing career ==
He is perhaps best remembered for hitting the game-winning shot in the 1987 NCAA championship game that gave the Indiana Hoosiers a 74–73 victory over the Syracuse Orangemen. He had transferred to Indiana from Garden City Community College in Kansas where he was a two-year standout and Jayhawk Conference Player of the Year.

After two seasons at Indiana, Smart was signed by the San Antonio Spurs, with whom he played two games in the 1988–89 season. In 12 minutes, Smart scored two points and had two assists and one rebound. Smart later played in the Philippines, with the San Miguel Beermen of the PBA, in the 1989 Reinforced Conference, where he played through an injury and was eventually replaced by Ennis Whatley after only five games. After the PBA, he played in the World Basketball League: first with the Worcester Counts in 1989. He then played for the Youngstown Pride and was traded to the Halifax Windjammers in March 1991. Smart later played in the Continental Basketball Association with the Rapid City Thrillers (1995–96) and Fort Wayne Fury (1996–97). He also played two seasons in France and one in Venezuela.

== Coaching career ==
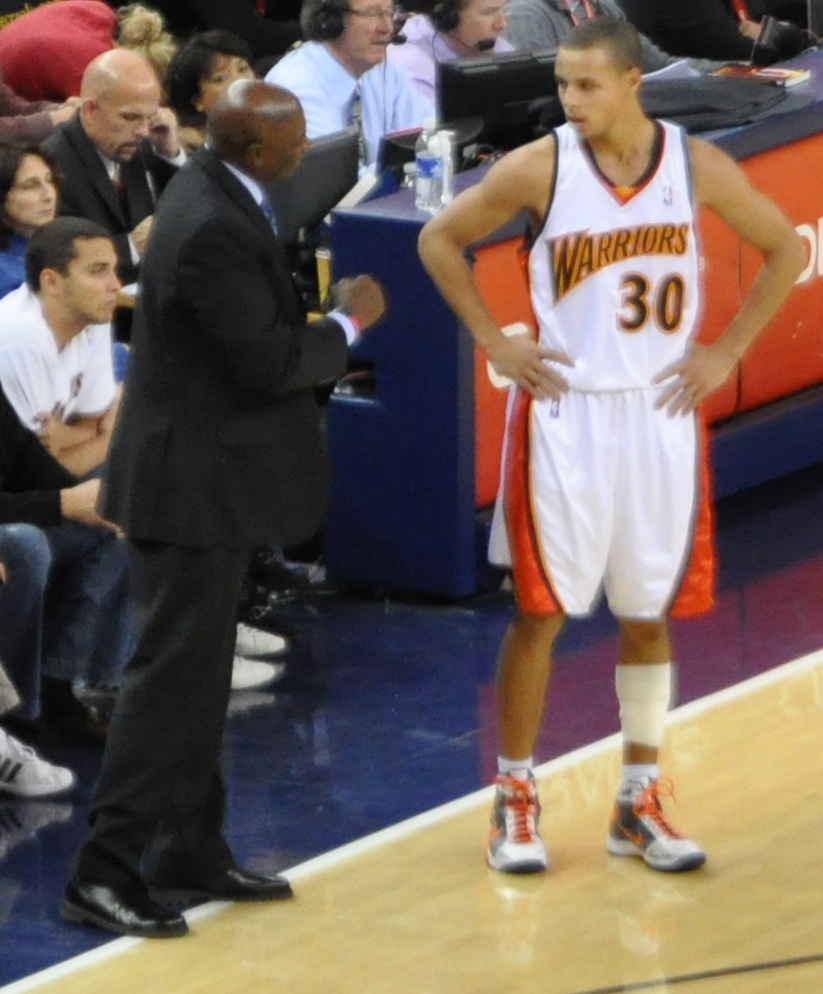
Smart as an assistant coach with the Golden State Warriors in 2009, instructing Stephen Curry

In 2002, Smart finished the season as interim coach of the Cleveland Cavaliers. His record was 9–31 with the club. In 2003, he became an assistant with the Golden State Warriors.

In 2010, Smart took over for Golden State Warriors head coach Don Nelson before the start of the 2010–11 training camp.

The Warriors fired Smart on April 27, 2011, following a 36-win season, a 10-game improvement from the previous season. He joined the Sacramento Kings as an assistant coach in November 2011. On January 5, 2012, the Kings named Smart head coach after firing Paul Westphal. He recorded a 48–93 record over parts of two seasons with the team. On May 31, 2013, the Kings fired Smart with one year remaining on his contract. On September 17, 2014, the Miami Heat announced they had hired Smart as an assistant coach.

On December 6, 2019, Smart was fired by the New York Knicks.

On May 12, 2021, Smart was announced as Assistant Coach of the Arkansas Razorbacks under Head Coach Eric Musselman. On January 15, 2022, Smart served one game as the Arkansas interim coach while Musselman was out with shoulder surgery. Smart led the unranked Razorbacks to a thrilling 65–58 victory over No. 12 LSU in Baton Rouge.

On January 13, 2025, Smart was announced as the head coach for Utah Prep Academy in Hurricane, Utah.

== Personal life ==
Smart and his wife Carol have two children. His son Jared is currently a wide receiver for the University of Hawaii.

== Career playing statistics ==
Legend
GP	Games played	GS	Games started	MPG	Minutes per game
FG%	Field goal percentage	3P%	3-point field goal percentage	FT%	Free throw percentage
RPG	Rebounds per game	APG	Assists per game	SPG	Steals per game
BPG	Blocks per game	PPG	Points per game	**Bold**	Career high

=== NBA ===
==== Regular season ====
Year	Team	GP	GS	MPG	FG%	3P%	FT%	RPG	APG	SPG	BPG	PPG
1988–89	San Antonio	2	0	6.0	.000	.000	1.000	.5	1.0	.0	.0	1.0

== Head coaching record ==
Legend
Regular season	G	Games coached	W	Games won	L	Games lost	W–L %	Win–loss %
Playoffs	PG	Playoff games	PW	Playoff wins	PL	Playoff losses	PW–L %	Playoff win–loss %

Team	Year	G	W	L	W–L%	Finish	PG	PW	PL	PW–L%	Result
Cleveland	2002–03	40	9	31	.225	8th in Central	—	—	—	—	Missed Playoffs
Golden State	2010–11	82	36	46	.439	3rd in Pacific	—	—	—	—	Missed Playoffs
Sacramento	2011–12	59	20	39	.339	5th in Pacific	—	—	—	—	Missed Playoffs
Sacramento	2012–13	82	28	54	.341	4th in Pacific	—	—	—	—	Missed Playoffs
**Career**		263	93	170	.354	—	—	—	—		
