= 1989 San Miguel Beermen season =

- Head coach: Norman Black
- General manager: Augusto Gregorio
- Owner: San Miguel Corporation

Open Conference results
- Record: 18–5 (78.3%)
- Place: 1st
- Playoff finish: Champions

All-Filipino Conference results
- Record: 16–9 (64%)
- Place: 1st
- Playoff finish: Champions

Reinforced Conference results
- Record: 16–7 (69.6%)
- Place: 1st
- Playoff finish: Champions

San Miguel Beermen seasons

The 1989 San Miguel Beermen season was the 15th season of the franchise in the Philippine Basketball Association (PBA).

== Transactions ==
Players Added	Signed	Former team
Ato Agustin	Off-season	N/A
Bobby Jose	Off-season	N/A

== Notable achievement ==
The San Miguel Beermen became the third team in PBA Annals History to win the Grandslam, duplicating the feat achieved by the famed Crispa Redmanizers, first in 1976 and in 1983. It also made Norman Black the 3rd. PBA coach to win the said feat behind Baby Dalupan & Tommy Manotoc.

== Awards ==
- Hector Calma was voted finals MVP in the three Conference-sweep by the Beermen.
- Ramon Fernandez lost out in the MVP honors and settled for the Mythical Five Selection along with Hector Calma.
- Two other beermen; Elmer Reyes and Alvin Teng, made it to the Mythical Second Team.

== Championships ==
Import Michael Phelps returns in the Open Conference. The Beermen completed a 10-game sweep in the elimination round and advances into the finals with ease with still four scheduled playing dates left in the semifinals. San Miguel easily retains the Open Conference crown with a 4–1 series victory over Formula Shell.

San Miguel and Purefoods Hotdogs played in the championship series in a highly anticipated All-Filipino finals affair. The Beermen prevailed in six games to win their first All-Filipino crown and seventh league title as they achieved step number two towards a grand slam.

The Beermen welcomes the return of Ricardo Brown from the lineup after skipping the first two conferences, they brought in Indiana's Keith Smart, best remembered for hitting the marginal basket that gave Indiana the 1987 NCAA championship, as their import. After the first round of eliminations, Smart was replaced by Ennis Whatley. San Miguel are tied with Purefoods Hotdogs with six wins and four losses after the elimination round. They lost their first two games in the semifinals in overtime, both by two points to Añejo Rum and Purefoods, before winning six in a row for a third trip in the finals series. San Miguel won the Grandslam with a 4–1 series win over sister team Añejo Rum 65.

== Occurrences ==
In their second meeting with the hot-streaking Purefoods Hotdogs during the All-Filipino Conference on July 18, the Beermen lost Samboy Lim to an injury due to a bad fall late in the fourth quarter after going up against three hotdogs' defenders, San Miguel lost the match, 115–125, for their second defeat in nine games while the Hotdogs avenged their one-point loss to the Beermen in the first round and won for the fifth straight time and tied San Miguel on top of the standings.

== Notable dates ==
March 5: The defending champions opened its title-retention campaign with a thrilling 140-136 come-from-behind victory over Formula Shell in the second game of the league opening before a jampacked crowd at the ULTRA. The Beermen overcame Bobby Parks' 72 points for Shell and spoiled the debut of prize rookie center Benjie Paras, who tallied only 8 points in his first game.

March 16: San Miguel carved out a 118–107 win over Presto Ice Cream as the Beermen swept the first round of eliminations in the Open Conference.

April 9: The Beermen's three-point bombs in the final stretch took the sting out of sizzling Purefoods rally. Ahead by only three, 105–102, the Beermen banked on a three-point scoring spree of Ricky Cui, Franz Pumaren and import Michael Phelps to post a commanding 114–102 lead with 5:21 to go as the Beermen fashioned out a 122–116 victory over Purefoods to complete a rare 10-game sweep in the elimination round.

April 27: Yves Dignadice struck with a 16-foot fall-away jumper from the right side with five seconds left to lift the Beermen to their 13th win in 15 games, a 101–99 victory over Presto Ice Cream as the Beermen claim the first finals berth in the Open Conference.

July 2: Franz Pumaren scored on a go-ahead layup with three ticks left as San Miguel nip Purefoods, 117–116, in the first meeting between two-highly rated teams in the All-Filipino Conference. Pumaren scored the last five points for the Beermen. The Hotdogs trailed for most of the way but grab the upperhand twice in the final two minutes, the last at 116–115 on Nelson Asaytono's follow-up shot with six seconds to go.

July 25: The Beermen snapped a two-game losing streak with a 123–115 win over eliminated-Presto Tivolis and avenged their first round loss to this same team last June 29. San Miguel finish the eliminations with eight wins and three losses.

July 27: San Miguel halted Purefoods' seven-game winning run and tied their won-loss standings at nine wins and three losses with a 112–108 victory on the first day of the semifinal round.

August 6: The "Skywalker" returns as the buzzer-beating basket by Samboy Lim on a perfect pass by Bobby Jose gave San Miguel a narrow 121–120 win over Formula Shell, which placed the game under protest.

October 15: San Miguel notch its third win in a row after losing their first two games in the Reinforced Conference by beating Presto Tivoli, 139–136. Beermen import Keith Smart completed a three-point play with five seconds to go in a bizarre ending placed under protest by the Tivolis, citing the grievous error and judgment call by referee Rudy Hines, who ruled a sideline inbound in favor of the Beermen when the ball clearly bounced off the foot of Smart with six seconds remaining and the score tied at 136-all.

November 21: San Miguel secured a finals seat and a quest for a Grandslam bid alive, defeating Alaska Milkmen, 124–119, for its 12th win in 18 games, leaving the other seat contested by Purefoods Hotdogs and Añejo Rum 65.

== Won–loss records vs opponents ==
Team	Win	Loss	1st (Open)	2nd (All-Filipino)	3rd (Reinforced)
Alaska	11	1	4-0	3-1	4-0
Anejo	9	6	2-0	2-2	5-4
Presto	8	2	3-1	1-1	4-0
Purefoods	11	7	3-1	6-4	2-2
Shell	10	5	6-3	3-1	1-1
RP Team	1	0	N/A	1-0	N/A
Total	50	21	18-5	16-9	16-7

== Roster ==
1989 San Miguel Beermen roster
Players

Pos.	#	POB	Name	Height	Weight	DOB (YYYY–MM–DD)	From
F	4	(Philippines)	Elmer Reyes	6 ft 1 in (1.85 m)			San Beda
G	5	(Philippines)	Franz Pumaren	5 ft 9 in (1.75 m)			De La Salle
G	6	(Philippines)	Ato Agustin	5 ft 11 in (1.80 m)			Lyceum
G	7	(Philippines)	Alfie Almario	6 ft 0 in (1.83 m)			De La Salle
F	8	(Philippines)	Bobby Jose	6 ft 3 in (1.91 m)			UST
F	9	(Philippines)	Samboy Lim	6 ft 0 in (1.83 m)			Letran
F	10	(Philippines)	Alvin Teng	6 ft 4 in (1.93 m)			Arellano
C	11	(Philippines)	Tonichi Yturri	6 ft 5 in (1.96 m)			De La Salle
F	12	(Philippines)	Yves Dignadice	6 ft 4 in (1.93 m)			STI WNU
G	14	(Philippines)	Hector Calma	5 ft 9 in (1.75 m)			Adamson
F	15	(Philippines)	Ricardo Cui	6 ft 3 in (1.91 m)			Lyceum
F	17	(Philippines)	Jeffrey Graves	6 ft 3 in (1.91 m)			Angeles
C	19	(Philippines)	Ramon Fernandez	6 ft 4 in (1.93 m)			San Carlos
G	23	(United States)	Ricardo Brown	6 ft 0 in (1.83 m)			Pepperdine

Coaches

Head coach

- (United States) Norman Black

Assistant coach(es)

- (Philippines) Derrick Pumaren
- (Philippines) Pilo Pumaren

Team manager

- (Philippines) Augusto Gregorio

Legend

- (C) Team captain
- Injured

=== Imports ===
Name	Conference	No.	Pos.	Ht.	College
Michael Phelps	Open Conference	25	Forward	6"3'	Alcorn State University
Keith Smart ^{played five games}	Reinforced Conference	22	Guard-Forward	6"0'	University of Indiana
Ennis Whatley ^{replaces Keith Smart}	Reinforced Conference	3	Guard-Forward	6"1'	University of Alabama
