= 1989 PBA Reinforced Conference finals =

Philippine basketball tournament

Team	Coach	Wins
San Miguel Beermen	Norman Black	4
Añejo Rum 65ers	Robert Jaworski	1
- Dates: November 28 – December 12, 1989
- Television: Vintage Sports (PTV)
- Radio network: DZSR

PBA Reinforced Conference finals chronology
- < 1988

The 1989 PBA Reinforced Conference finals was the best-of-7 series basketball championship of the 1989 PBA Reinforced Conference, and the conclusion of the conference's playoffs. The San Miguel Beermen and the Añejo Rum 65ers played for the 44th championship contested by the league.

The San Miguel Beermen won their finals series against Añejo Rum 65ers, four games to one, becoming the third team in PBA history to achieve the distinction of capturing the Grandslam.

== Qualification ==
San Miguel		Añejo
Finished 6–4 (.600), tied for 1st	Eliminations	Finished 5–5 (.500), tied for 2nd
Finished 12–6 (.667), 1st	Semifinals	Finished 10–8 (.556), tied for 2nd
Finished 12–6 (.667), 1st	Tiebreaker	Won against Purefoods, 113–112

== Series scoring summary ==
Team	Game 1	Game 2	Game 3	Game 4	Game 5	Wins
San Miguel Beer	134	140	134	150	122	4
Anejo Rum 65	125	134	138	134	111	1
Venue	ULTRA	ULTRA	ULTRA	ULTRA	ULTRA

== Games summary ==
=== Game 1 ===
Vintage

November 28
7:30 pm

San Miguel Beermen 134, Añejo Rum 65ers 125
Pts: Ennis Whatley 52	Pts: Carlos Briggs 56
San Miguel leads series, 1–0

The ULTRA, Pasig, Metro Manila

Elmer Reyes opened up with a booming triple, Yves Dignadice knock in an 18-foot jumper and Ramon Fernandez came off the bench to sizzle with a perimeter basket that highlighted a nine-point blast from a 110–111 deficit that sent the Beermen ahead at 119–111, 4:03 left in the game, with 25 seconds left to play, the Beermen ahead, 132–122, Rudy Distrito hit Alvin Teng on a rebound play, forcing the San Miguel player to retaliate with a shove.

=== Game 2 ===
Vintage

November 30
7:30 pm

San Miguel Beermen 140, Añejo Rum 65ers 134
Pts: Carlos Briggs 84
San Miguel leads series, 2–0

The ULTRA, Pasig, Metro Manila

The second game was poorly officiated as rookie referees, Benjie Chua, Bernie de Dios and Gregorio Llaguno, failed to keep the game under control. San Miguel went up 74–66 at halftime and 108–100 at the end of the third quarter, a total of four technicals were given to Añejo while the referees give San Miguel only one warning through a deliberate foul by Ramon Fernandez against Carlos Briggs, the Añejo import, who scored a record 84 points, was clobbered by a triple-man defense during driving plays and no fouls were called, at the final buzzer, Rudy Distrito flung his elbows wildly at Fernandez, unruly fans triggered off a riotous protest against poor officiating, the aftermath of Game 2 had debris-throwing incident and bloody fighting among spectators.

=== Game 3 ===
Vintage

December 7
7:30 pm

San Miguel Beermen 134, Añejo Rum 65ers 138
Pts: Ennis Whatley 41	Pts: Carlos Briggs 71
San Miguel leads series, 2–1

The ULTRA, Pasig, Metro Manila

Game 3 had two postponements because of the impending coup against the Philippine government. Prior to the third game, PBA Commissioner Rudy Salud issued a summon for Añejo playing coach Robert Jaworski and coach Norman Black of San Miguel in an effort to crush the brewing violence-related crisis within the pro-league, the 65ers' Rudy Distrito was suspended in Game three after Salud found him guilty of rough plays against Ennis Whatley in the chaotic Game two. Carlos Briggs scored 71 points but it was reserve-center Peter Aguilar's three-point play that broke the last deadlock at 133-all, as Añejo escaped with a victory to cut the series deficit to 2–1.

=== Game 4 ===
Vintage

December 10
6:30 pm

San Miguel Beermen 150, Añejo Rum 65ers 134
Pts: Ennis Whatley 50	Pts: Carlos Briggs 60
San Miguel leads series, 3–1

The ULTRA, Pasig, Metro Manila

Ricardo Brown and Ennis Whatley combined for 71 points as San Miguel led from start to finish, Yves Dignadice sparked a 16–4 run that gave the Beermen a 17-point spread, 62–45, with 1:33 left before halftime. San Miguel enjoyed leads as much as 22 points with the last at 95–73.

=== Game 5 ===
Vintage

December 12
6:30 pm

San Miguel Beermen 122, Añejo Rum 65ers 111
Pts: Carlos Briggs 52
San Miguel wins series, 4–1

The ULTRA, Pasig, Metro Manila

Trailing by six points, 43–49 at halftime, San Miguel broke even at 78-all going into the last 12 minutes of play, a 9–3 burst opened a six-point advantage for the beermen at 87–81. With 8:53 left in the final period and the Beermen ahead by only two points, 87–85, import Ennis Whatley committed his sixth and final foul off a driving Joey Loyzaga, the Beermen had to play all-Filipino in the last 8:42 and Ricardo Brown combined with Hector Calma and Samboy Lim as San Miguel began pulling away with a 15-point margin at 116–101.

1989 PBA Reinforced Conference Champions

San Miguel Beermen
Eight title

== Rosters ==
San Miguel Beermen roster
Players
Coaches

Pos.	#	POB	Name	Height	Weight	DOB (YYYY–MM–DD)	From
G	3	(United States)	Ennis Whatley (I)	6 ft 1 in (1.85 m)			Alabama
F	4	(Philippines)	Elmer Reyes	6 ft 1 in (1.85 m)			San Beda
G	5	(Philippines)	Franz Pumaren	5 ft 9 in (1.75 m)			De La Salle
G	6	(Philippines)	Ato Agustin	5 ft 11 in (1.80 m)			Lyceum
G	7	(Philippines)	Alfie Almario	6 ft 0 in (1.83 m)			De La Salle
F	8	(Philippines)	Bobby Jose	6 ft 3 in (1.91 m)			UST
F	9	(Philippines)	Samboy Lim	6 ft 0 in (1.83 m)			Letran
F	10	(Philippines)	Alvin Teng	6 ft 4 in (1.93 m)			Arellano
C	11	(Philippines)	Tonichi Yturri	6 ft 5 in (1.96 m)			De La Salle
F	12	(Philippines)	Yves Dignadice	6 ft 4 in (1.93 m)			STI WNU
G	14	(Philippines)	Hector Calma	5 ft 9 in (1.75 m)			Adamson
F	17	(Philippines)	Jeffrey Graves	6 ft 3 in (1.91 m)			Angeles
C	19	(Philippines)	Ramon Fernandez	6 ft 4 in (1.93 m)			San Carlos
G	23	(United States)	Ricardo Brown	5 ft 11 in (1.80 m)			Pepperdine

Head coach

- (United States) Norman Black

Assistant coach(es)

- (Philippines) Derrick Pumaren

Legend

- (C) Team captain
- (CI) Commissioner's Cup Import
- (GI) Governors' Cup Import
- (EI) EASL Import
- (DP) Unsigned draft pick
- (FA) Free agent
- (IN) Inactive
- (S) Suspended
- (R) Rookie
- (I) Import
- Injured

Añejo Rum 65ers roster
Players
Coaches

Pos.	#	POB	Name	Height	Weight	DOB (YYYY–MM–DD)	From
C	4	(Philippines)	Peter Aguilar	6 ft 5 in (1.96 m)			TUA
F	6	(Philippines)	Dondon Ampalayo	6 ft 3 in (1.91 m)			USJ–R
G	7	(Philippines)	Robert Jaworski	6 ft 1 in (1.85 m)			UE
G	9	(Philippines)	Leo Isaac	6 ft 1 in (1.85 m)			Mapúa
F	12	(Philippines)	Dante Gonzalgo	6 ft 2 in (1.88 m)			Lyceum
F	13	(Philippines)	Harmon Codinera	6 ft 3 in (1.91 m)			Far Eastern
G	14	(Philippines)	Joey Loyzaga	6 ft 1 in (1.85 m)			San Beda
F/C	15	(Philippines)	Rey Cuenco	6 ft 4 in (1.93 m)			De La Salle Araneta
G	17	(Philippines)	Rudy Distrito	5 ft 11 in (1.80 m)			UE
F	18	(Philippines)	Philip Cezar	6 ft 3 in (1.91 m)			José Rizal
C	22	(Philippines)	Romulo Mamaril	6 ft 6 in (1.98 m)			Mapúa
G	24	(United States)	Carlos Briggs (I)	5 ft 11 in (1.80 m)			Baylor
F	41	(Philippines)	Chito Loyzaga	6 ft 2 in (1.88 m)			San Beda

Head coach

- (Philippines) Robert Jaworski

Assistant coach(es)

- (Philippines) Rino Salazar

Legend

- (C) Team captain
- (CI) Commissioner's Cup Import
- (GI) Governors' Cup Import
- (EI) EASL Import
- (DP) Unsigned draft pick
- (FA) Free agent
- (IN) Inactive
- (S) Suspended
- (R) Rookie
- (I) Import
- Injured

== Broadcast notes ==
Game	Play-by-play	Analyst
Game 1		
Game 2		
Game 3		
Game 4		
Game 5	Joe Cantada	Andy Jao
