= Worcester Counts =

The Worcester Counts were a professional basketball franchise based in Worcester, Massachusetts in 1989. The team played its inaugural season in the World Basketball League before folding. The Worcester Counts were one of numerous failed minor league franchises in Worcester, including the Bay State Bombardiers, a Continental Basketball League team, which lasted only two seasons in Worcester.

Former Indiana University star Keith Smart, who hit the game winning shot for the Hoosiers in the 1987 NCAA Championship Game, played for the Counts during the 1989 season.

The Worcester Counts game program features the Counts logo and drawing of the Worcester Centrum.

The Counts played its home games at the Centrum in Worcester.

== Season by season record ==
Season	GP	W	L	Pct.	GB	Finish	Playoffs
1989	44	18	26	.409	13	5th WBL	Did Not Qualify
Totals	44	18	26	.409	–	–	Playoff Record 0–0
