= 1989 PBA season =

15th PBA season

- Duration: March 5 – December 12, 1989
- Teams: 6
- TV partner: Vintage Sports (PTV)

1989 PBA Draft
- Top draft pick: Benjie Paras
- Picked by: Formula Shell
- Season MVP: Benjie Paras (Formula Shell Zoom Masters)
- Open Conference champions: San Miguel Beermen
- Open Conference runners-up: Formula Shell Zoom Masters
- All-Filipino Conference champions: San Miguel Beermen
- All-Filipino Conference runners-up: Purefoods Hotdogs
- Reinforced Conference champions: San Miguel Beermen
- Reinforced Conference runners-up: Añejo Rum 65ers

Seasons
- ← 1988 1990 →

The 1989 PBA season was the 15th season of the Philippine Basketball Association (PBA).

== Board of governors ==
=== Executive committee ===
- Rodrigo L. Salud (Commissioner)
- Reynaldo Marquez (Chairman, representing Formula Shell Zoom Masters)
- Jose C. Ibazeta (Vice-Chairman, representing San Miguel Beermen)
- Wilfred Steven Uytengsu (Treasurer, representing Alaska Milkmen)

=== Teams ===
Team	Company	Governor
Alaska Milkmen	General Milling Corporation	Wilfred Steven Uytengsu
Añejo Rhum 65ers	La Tondeña Incorporada	Carlos Palanca III
Purefoods TJ Hotdogs	Purefoods Corporation	Renato Buhain
Presto Ice Cream Makers	Consolidated Foods Corporation	Lance Gokongwei
San Miguel Beermen	San Miguel Corporation	Jose Ibazeta
Formula Shell Zoom Masters	Pilipinas Shell Petroleum Corporation	Reynaldo Marquez

== Season highlights ==
- The league picked up the concessionaire franchise fee in The ULTRA worth P1.5 million and agreed with member teams that sells food products (Alaska, Purefoods, San Miguel and Presto) to sell their products inside the venue at factory price. Likewise, Shell and Anejo will shoulder the cost of building pedestrian walkways outside of the arena.
- The richest crop of rookies and the most talented PBA batch of draftees came to the PBA in its 15th season, most notable names were Benjie Paras, Nelson Asaytono, Dindo Pumaren, Paul Alvarez, Zaldy Realubit, Elmer Cabahug, Romeo Dela Rosa, Renato Agustin and Ricric Marata.
- The PBA logo was prominently displayed on the uniforms for the first time (usually on the left side of the jersey) at the start of the All-Filipino Conference, becoming the first sports league in the Philippines to do so. The practice of placing the league logo on the jerseys eventually spreads to the PABL, UAAP, and NCAA.
- The PBA All-Star game was held on June 4, featuring the Veterans, coach by Baby Dalupan, against the Rookies/Sophomores of coach Dante Silverio. The Veterans won the game on Ramon Fernandez's last-second basket on an inbound pass from former Toyota teammate Sonny Jaworski. The All-Star MVP was awarded to Elmer Cabahug of the Rookies/Sophomores team.
- The San Miguel Beermen completed a three-conference sweep, becoming the second team to win the third Grand Slam in the League. Beermen coach Norman Black was the third coach to win the said feat, following the footsteps of Baby Dalupan in 1976 and Tommy Manotoc in 1983, who both achieved the Grand Slam with the Crispa Redmanizers.
- Shell rookie center Benjie Paras, the first overall draft pick of the season, made history by winning both the Most Valuable Player and the Rookie of the Year awards, the only occurrence in the league.

== Opening ceremonies ==
The muses for the participating teams are as follows:

Team	Muse
Alaska Milkmen	Debbie Po
Añejo Rum 65	Gretchen Barretto
Formula Shell	Leah Orosa
Presto Ice Cream	Dina Bonnevie
Purefoods Hotdogs	Lea Salonga
San Miguel Beermen	Marilou Gonzales and Rachel Lobangco

== Champions ==
- Open Conference: San Miguel Beermen
- All-Filipino Conference: San Miguel Beermen
- Reinforced Conference: San Miguel Beermen
- Team with best win–loss percentage: San Miguel Beermen (50-21, .704)
- Best Team of the Year: San Miguel Beermen (2nd)

== Open Conference ==
=== Elimination round ===
Pos	Team	W	L	PCT	GB	Qualification
1	San Miguel Beermen	10	0	1.000	—	Semifinal round
2	Presto Ice Cream	5	5	.500	5	Semifinal round
3	Formula Shell Zoom Masters	5	5	.500	5	Semifinal round
4	Purefoods Hotdogs	4	6	.400	6	Semifinal round
5	Alaska Milkmen	3	7	.300 (Note: Semifinal berth playoff: Alaska 133–120 Añejo)	7	Semifinal round
6	Añejo Rum 65ers	3	7	.300	7	

=== Semifinal round ===
Overall standings
Pos	Team	W	L	PCT	GB	Qualification
1	San Miguel Beermen	14	4	.778	—	Advance to the Finals
2	Formula Shell Zoom Masters	10	8	.556	4	Advance to the Finals
3	Presto Ice Cream	9	9	.500	5	Proceed to third place playoffs
4	Alaska Milkmen	7	11	.389 (Note: Head-to-head record: Alaska 2–2 Purefoods, Alaska +9)	7	Proceed to third place playoffs
5	Purefoods Hotdogs	7	11	.389	7	

Notes:

Semifinal round standings
Pos	Team	W	L
1	Formula Shell Zoom Masters	5	3
2	San Miguel Beermen	4	4
3	Presto Ice Cream	4	4
4	Alaska Milkmen	4	4
5	Purefoods Hotdogs	3	5

=== Third place playoffs ===
Team 1	Series	Team 2	Game 1	Game 2	Game 3	Game 4	Game 5
(3) Presto Ice Cream	0–3	(4) Alaska Milkmen	112–133	126–135	129–135	—	—

=== Finals ===
Team 1	Series	Team 2	Game 1	Game 2	Game 3	Game 4	Game 5	Game 6	Game 7
(1) San Miguel Beermen	4–1	(2) Formula Shell Zoom Masters	146–132	114–107	130–124	104–115	123–105	—	—

- Best Import of the Conference: Bobby Parks (Shell)

== All-Filipino Conference ==
=== Elimination round ===
Pos	Team	W	L	PCT	GB	Qualification
1	Purefoods Hotdogs	9	2	.818	—	Semifinal round
2	San Miguel Beermen	8	3	.727	1	Semifinal round
3	Formula Shell Zoom Masters	6	5	.545	3	Semifinal round
4	Añejo Rum 65ers	6	5	.545	3	Semifinal round
5	Alaska Milkmen	5	6	.455	4	Semifinal round
6	Presto Ice Cream	2	9	.182	7	
—	Team Philippines (Note: Team Philippines could only participate in the first round robin of games, and all results counted in the standings for their opponents; the team cannot participate in the semifinals.) (G)	0	6	.000	6.5	

(G) Guests

=== Semifinal round ===
Overall standings
Pos	Team	W	L	PCT	GB	Qualification
1	Purefoods Hotdogs	14	5	.737	—	Advance to the Finals
2	San Miguel Beermen	12	7	.632	2	Advance to the Finals
3	Añejo Rum 65ers	10	9	.526 (Note: Head-to-head record: Añejo 2–2 Shell, Añejo +5)	4	Proceed to third place playoffs
4	Formula Shell Zoom Masters	10	9	.526	4	Proceed to third place playoffs
5	Alaska Milkmen	8	11	.421	6	

Notes:

Semifinal round standings
Pos	Team	W	L
1	Purefoods Hotdogs	5	3
2	San Miguel Beermen	4	4
3	Añejo Rum 65ers	4	4
4	Formula Shell Zoom Masters	4	4
5	Alaska Milkmen	3	5

=== Third place playoffs ===
Team 1	Series	Team 2	Game 1	Game 2	Game 3	Game 4	Game 5
(3) Añejo Rum 65ers	2–3	(4) Formula Shell Zoom Masters	121–114	107–121	138–128	120–124	114–116

=== Finals ===
Team 1	Series	Team 2	Game 1	Game 2	Game 3	Game 4	Game 5	Game 6	Game 7
(1) Purefoods Hotdogs	2–4	(2) San Miguel Beermen	120–112	111–119	109–122	113–119	142–136 (OT)	109–128	—

== Reinforced Conference ==
=== Elimination round ===
Pos	Team	W	L	PCT	GB	Qualification
1	San Miguel Beermen	6	4	.600	—	Semifinal round
2	Purefoods Hotdogs	6	4	.600	—	Semifinal round
3	Presto Tivolis	5	5	.500	1	Semifinal round
4	Añejo Rum 65ers	5	5	.500	1	Semifinal round
5	Alaska Milkmen	5	5	.500	1	Semifinal round
6	Formula Shell Zoom Masters	3	7	.300	3	

=== Semifinal round ===
Overall standings
Pos	Team	W	L	PCT	GB	Qualification
1	San Miguel Beermen	12	6	.667	—	Advance to the Finals (Note: If a team outside the top two teams wins at least five semifinal round games, then it and the second-placed team will playoff for the last Finals berth; otherwise, the top 2 teams qualify outright.)
2	Purefoods Hotdogs	10	8	.556 (Note: Head-to-head record: Purefoods 2–2 Añejo, Purefoods +6)	2	Guaranteed Finals berth playoff
3	Añejo Rum 65ers	10	8	.556	2	Qualify to Finals berth playoff
4	Alaska Milkmen	8	10	.444	4	Proceed to third place playoffs
5	Presto Tivolis	7	11	.389	5	

Notes:

Semifinal round standings
Pos	Team	W	L	Qualification
1	San Miguel Beermen	6	2	
2	Añejo Rum 65ers	5	3	Qualify to Finals berth playoff (Note: San Miguel advanced to the Finals outright as #1 seeded team; Finals berth playoff: Añejo 113–112 Purefoods)
3	Purefoods Hotdogs	4	4	
4	Alaska Milkmen	3	5	
5	Presto Tivolis	2	6	

=== Third place playoffs ===
Team 1	Series	Team 2	Game 1	Game 2	Game 3	Game 4	Game 5
(2) Purefoods Hotdogs	1–3	(4) Alaska Milkmen	109–116	114–108	112–123	102–126	—

=== Finals ===
Team 1	Series	Team 2	Game 1	Game 2	Game 3	Game 4	Game 5	Game 6	Game 7
(1) San Miguel Beermen	4–1	(3) Añejo Rum 65ers	134–125	140–134	134–138	150–134	122–111	—	—

- Best Import of the Conference: Carlos Briggs (Shell)

== Awards ==
- Most Valuable Player: Benjie Paras (Shell)
- Rookie of the Year: Benjie Paras (Shell)
- Most Improved Player: Dante Gonzalgo (Añejo)
- Best Import-Open Conference: Bobby Parks (Shell)
- Best Import-Reinforced Conference: Carlos Briggs (Añejo)
- Mythical Five:
  - Hector Calma (San Miguel)
  - Ramon Fernandez (San Miguel)
  - Benjie Paras (Shell)
  - Alvin Patrimonio (Purefoods)
  - Allan Caidic (Presto)
- Mythical Second Team:
  - Elmer Reyes (San Miguel)
  - Ronnie Magsanoc (Shell)
  - Jerry Codiñera (Purefoods)
  - Paul Alvarez (Alaska)
  - Alvin Teng (San Miguel)
- All-Defensive Team:
  - Jerry Codiñera (Purefoods)
  - Glenn Capacio (Purefoods)
  - Alvin Teng (San Miguel)
  - Elpidio Villamin (Alaska)
  - Chito Loyzaga (Añejo)

== Board of Governors ==
- Rudy Salud (Commissioner)
- Rey Marquez (Chairman, Pilipinas Shell Petroleum Corp.)
- Jose Ibazeta (Vice-Chairman, San Miguel Corp.)
- Ruben Cleofe (Secretary)
- Wilfred Steven Uytengsu (Treasurer, General Milling Corp.)
- Lance Gokongwei (Consolidated Food Corp.)
- Carlos Palanca III (La Tondeña Distillers, Inc.)
- Renato Buhain (Purefoods Corp.)

== Cumulative standings ==
Pos	Team	Pld	W	L	PCT	Best finish
1	San Miguel Beermen	71	50	21	.704	Champions
2	Purefoods Hotdogs	66	34	32	.515	Finalist
3	Alaska Air Force	63	30	33	.476	Third place
4	Formula Shell Zoom Masters	57	27	30	.474	Finalist
5	Añejo Rum 65ers	59	27	32	.458	Finalist
6	Presto Ice Cream/Tivolis	50	18	32	.360	Semifinalist
7	Team Philippines (G)	6	0	6	.000	Elimination round

(G) Guests

=== Elimination round ===
Pos	Team	Pld	W	L	PCT
1	San Miguel Beermen	31	24	7	.774
2	Purefoods Hotdogs	31	19	12	.613
3	Añejo Rum 65ers	31	14	17	.452
4	Formula Shell Zoom Masters	31	14	17	.452
5	Alaska Air Force	31	13	18	.419
6	Presto Ice Cream/Tivolis	31	12	19	.387
7	Team Philippines (G)	6	0	6	.000

(G) Guests

=== Playoffs ===
Pos	Team	Pld	W	L
1	San Miguel Beermen	40	26	14
2	Alaska Air Force	32	17	15
3	Purefoods Hotdogs	35	15	20
4	Formula Shell Zoom Masters	26	13	13
5	Añejo Rum 65ers	28	13	15
6	Presto Ice Cream/Tivolis	19	6	13
