= 1976 Toyota Tamaraws season =

- Head coach: Dante Silverio
- Owner(s): Delta Motor Corporation

First Conference results
- Record: 20–6 (76.9%)
- Place: 2nd
- Playoff finish: Finals

Second Conference results
- Record: 20–6 (76.9%)
- Place: 2nd
- Playoff finish: Finals

All-Philippine Championship results
- Record: 6–3 (66.7%)
- Place: 2nd
- Playoff finish: Finals

Toyota Tamaraws seasons

The 1976 Toyota Tamaraws season was the second season of the franchise in the Philippine Basketball Association (PBA).

== Names and colors ==
Toyota Comets (First and Second conferences)
(dark)
(light)

Toyota Silver Tamaraws (All-Philippine Championship)
(dark)
(light)

NOTE: Toyota changed their monicker from the Comets to the Silver Tamaraws during the 1976 PBA Second Conference finals, but would still wear the Comets uniform used during the first and second conferences of the 1976 season.

== Off-season transactions ==
TRANSACTIONS
Gil Cortez ^{Rookie;} ^{former national team mainstay}
Rollie Marcelo ^{Acquired from Royal Tru-Orange}
Elias Tolentino ^{Rookie; acquired from Yco Painters in the MICAA}

== Finals stint ==
Toyota placed runner-up to Crispa in all three contested championships for the season. In the first conference finals, the Comets won the series opener but were beaten three straight by the Redmanizers.

In the second conference, Crispa and Toyota meet again in the final series. The Redmanizers took the first two games but the Silver Tamaraws avoided a sweep by taking the third game. Two nights later on November 18, Crispa clinch its third straight crown with a 3-1 series victory.

In the All-Philippine championship, Toyota led the series, two games to none, but Crispa came back and win the final three games to capture the league's first Grandslam as the Tamaraws ended up bridesmaid for the third time in the year and had lost to their archrivals in the last four conferences.

== Roster ==
Roster	#	Position	Height
Rolando Marcelo	6	Forward-Guard	5 ft 10 in (1.78 m)
Robert Jaworski	7	Guard	6 ft 1 in (1.85 m)
Francis Arnaiz	8	Guard	5 ft 11 in (1.80 m)
Orlando Bauzon	9	Guard	6 ft 1 in (1.85 m)
Ramon Fernandez	10	Center	6 ft 4 in (1.93 m)
Rodolfo Segura	15	Forward	6 ft 2 in (1.88 m)
Virgilio Cortez	16	Center-Forward	6 ft 4 in (1.93 m)
Fort Acuña	17	Forward	6 ft 1 in (1.85 m)
Elias Tolentino	21	Center-Forward	6 ft 2 in (1.88 m)
Joaquín Rojas	22	Guard	5 ft 7 in (1.70 m)
Aurelio Clariño	23	Center	6 ft 2 in (1.88 m)
Byron Jones ^{Import}	33	Center	6 ft 8 in (2.03 m)
Howard Smith ^{Import}	35	Forward	6 ft 5 in (1.96 m)

== Awards ==
- Virgilio "Gil" Cortez became the PBA's first-ever Rookie of the Year.
