= 1976 Crispa Redmanizers season =

- Head coach: Baby Dalupan
- Owner(s): P. Floro and Sons, Inc.

First Conference results
- Record: 22–4 (84.6%)
- Place: 1st
- Playoff finish: Finals

Second Conference results
- Record: 19–7 (73.1%)
- Place: 1st
- Playoff finish: Finals

All-Philippine Championship results
- Record: 6–4 (60%)
- Place: 1st
- Playoff finish: Finals

Crispa Redmanizers seasons

The 1976 Crispa Redmanizers season was the 2nd season of the franchise in the Philippine Basketball Association (PBA). Also known as Crispa Denims.

== Colors ==
Crispa-Floro Redmanizers (First and Second Conferences)
(dark)
(light)
Crispa-Floro Denims (All-Philippine Conference)
(dark)
(light)

== Notable achievements ==
- The Crispa Redmanizers became the league's first-ever Grandslam champion by winning all three conferences.
- William "Bogs" Adornado won his second Most Valuable Player (MVP) award.

== Summary ==
1st Conference: Crispa finished the eliminations with a near-perfect record of 15-1 won-loss slate, losing only to the U/Tex Wranglers in the first round. The Toyota Comets were at second with 14-2, with two losses coming from the Redmanizers. In the four-team semifinal round, along with Noritake Festivals and Quasar TV Makers, the Comets (5-1) and the Redmanizers (4-2) made it to the championship as expected. In the finals series, Toyota took Game one, 119-115, but Crispa bounces back with victories in Game two, 117-112, and Game three, 121-114. In the fourth game of the series on July 11, the Redmanizers erected an 18-point lead at the end of the third quarter, 91-73. The Comets came back in the last quarter with a furious rally engineered by their two shooting guards; Sonny Jaworski and Francis Arnaiz. The Comets were down by only two points, 95-97, with three minutes left in the ballgame and had the chance to send the game into overtime with eight seconds remaining in regulation and the score standing at 101-99 for Crispa, but Toyota center Ramon Fernandez missed the first of his two charity shots and sink the second for the final count, 101-100, as the Redmanizers dribbled away the remaining seconds for the victory. Crispa won the finals series, three games to one.

2nd Conference: Reinforced by Cyrus Mann and William "Bill" Bunton, the Redmanizers, known as Crispa Denims at the start of the conference, finished the eliminations at 12-4, behind Toyota's 14-2 won-loss card. In the semifinal round, Toyota and Crispa pulled away in the second round against the two other semifinalist, U/Tex and Royal Tru-Orangemen, with two victories in provincial outings. Toyota again finished with a 5-1 record in the semifinals as to Crispa's 4-2. The Redmanizers repeated over their arch rivals Toyota Tamaraws, which had Byron "Snake" Jones and Howard Smith as their imports, in the championship series. Crispa won the first two games, 95-92 and 98-93, the Tamaraws avoided a sweep by taking Game three, 108-98. On November 18, Crispa captured their third straight title with a 103-94 victory over Toyota for another 3-1 series win.

All-Philippine championship: In a round-robin among five teams, Toyota were unblemished at 4-0, Crispa were tied with Noritake with two wins against two losses, Royal and U/Tex were at the bottom with 1-3. The Redmanizers had to beat Noritake Porcelain Makers in a playoff to advance into the finals and play Toyota for the sixth time in the championship series. Crispa overcame a 0-2 deficit against Toyota and won the last three games to achieve the league's first Grandslam. The Redmanizers clinch their fourth consecutive crown on December 21, winning 110-92 over Toyota as Atoy Co scored 39 points in the deciding game of the best-of-five series.

== Roster ==
Roster	#	Position	Height
Abet Guidaben	5	Center	6 ft 5 in (1.96 m)
Fortunato Co, Jr	6	Guard	6 ft 1 in (1.85 m)
Rodolfo Soriano	7	Forward	6 ft 2 in (1.88 m)
Reynaldo Pages	8	Forward	6 ft 1 in (1.85 m)
Gregorio Dionisio	9	Guard	5 ft 9 in (1.75 m)
Freddie Hubalde	10	Guard-Forward	6 ft 1 in (1.85 m)
William Adornado	11	Forward	6 ft 1 in (1.85 m)
Virgilio Dela Cruz	12	Guard-Forward	6 ft 3 in (1.91 m)
Tito Varela	14	Guard	6 ft 1 in (1.85 m)
Bernie Fabiosa	15	Guard	5 ft 9 in (1.75 m)
David Cezar	16	Guard	5 ft 11 in (1.80 m)
Philip Cezar	18	Forward	6 ft 3 in (1.91 m)
Reynaldo Franco	19	Guard	5 ft 9 in (1.75 m)
Cristino Calilan	23	Guard	5 ft 8 in (1.73 m)
Cyrus Mann ^{Import}	25	Center	6 ft 10 in (2.08 m)
William Bunton ^{Import}	33	Forward-Center	6 ft 8 in (2.03 m)
