= 1976 PBA Second Conference finals =

Team	Coach	Wins
Crispa Redmanizers	Baby Dalupan	3
Toyota Silver Tamaraws	Dante Silverio	1
- Dates: November 12 – 18, 1976
- Television: GTV
- Announcers: DWXL

PBA Second Conference finals chronology
- < 1975

The 1976 PBA Second Conference finals was the best-of-5 basketball championship series of the 1976 PBA Second Conference, and the conclusion of the conference's playoffs. The Crispa Redmanizers and Toyota Silver Tamaraws played in the finals for the fifth straight time.

The Crispa Redmanizers won their second championship of the season and third in a row, scoring a similar three games to one series victory against the Toyota Silver Tamaraws.

== Qualification ==
Crispa Redmanizers		Toyota Silver Tamaraws
Finished 12–4 (.750), 2nd	Eliminations	Finished 14–2 (.875), 1st
Finished 4–2 (.667), 2nd	Semifinals	Finished 5–1 (.833), 1st

== Games summary ==
GTV

November 12

Crispa Redmanizers 95, Toyota Silver Tamaraws 92
Scoring by quarter: 16–24, 21–16, 30–30, 28–22
Pts: Atoy Co 30	Pts: Ramon Fernandez 22

Araneta Coliseum, Quezon City

GTV

November 14

Crispa Redmanizers 98, Toyota Silver Tamaraws 93
Scoring by quarter: 24–23, 20–15, 26–26, 28–29
Pts: Bernie Fabiosa 18	Pts: Arnaiz, Fernandez & Jaworski 19

Araneta Coliseum, Quezon City

GTV

November 16

Crispa Redmanizers 98, Toyota Silver Tamaraws 108
Scoring by quarter: 26–25, 28–31, 28–24, 16–28
Pts: Atoy Co 32	Pts: Ompong Segura 24

Araneta Coliseum, Quezon City

GTV

November 18

Crispa Redmanizers 103, Toyota Silver Tamaraws 94
Scoring by quarter: 27–19, 24–25, 28–28, 24–22
Pts: Co 17 Hubalde 17	Pts: Robert Jaworski 19
Crispa wins series, 3–1

Araneta Coliseum, Quezon City

== Notes ==
During the championship series, Toyota changed their monicker from the Comets to the Silver Tamaraws but would still wear the Comets uniform used during the conference.

== Broadcast notes ==
Game	Play-by-play	Color commentator
Game 1	Dick Ildefonso	Emy Arcilla
Game 2	Dick Ildefonso	Emy Arcilla
Game 3	Dick Ildefonso	Emy Arcilla
Game 4	Dick Ildefonso	Emy Arcilla
