= 1989 Añejo Rum 65ers season =

- Head coach: Robert Jaworski
- General manager: Bernabe Navarro
- Owners: La Tondeña Distillers, Inc.

Open Conference results
- Record: 3–8 (27.3%)
- Place: 6th
- Playoff finish: Eliminated

All-Filipino Conference results
- Record: 12–12 (50%)
- Place: 4th
- Playoff finish: Semifinals

Reinforced Conference results
- Record: 12–12 (50%)
- Place: 2nd
- Playoff finish: Finals (lost to SMB)

Añejo Rum 65ers seasons

The 1989 Añejo Rum 65ers season was the 11th season of the franchise in the Philippine Basketball Association (PBA).

== Transactions ==
Players Added	Signed	Former team
Philip Cezar	Off-season	Presto
Peter Aguilar ^{Rookie}	Off-season	N/A
Fernando Garcia ^{Rookie}	Off-season	N/A

== Occurrences ==
During the first week of April, the Añejo Rum 65ers acquired Rey Cuenco from Shell in a trade that sent the team's first-round pick Romeo Dela Rosa to the Zoom Masters. Dela Rosa decided to sit out and opted not to sign a contract with Añejo before the season started. Cuenco played his first game with Añejo in a must-win situation against his former team Shell and the Rum Masters responded with a 155–135 victory.

Añejo playing-coach Sonny Jaworski was fined and suspended for one game due to the punching foul he committed against Jojo Lastimosa of Purefoods in their second-round elimination match on April 4.

In the Open Conference, Añejo Rum 65ers failed to advance in the semifinal round for the first time since Jaworski handled the team starting in 1985, after losing to Alaska in the knockout game on April 13.

== Awards ==
- Dante Gonzalgo was the season's Most Improved Player.
- Carlos Briggs was named Best Import of the Reinforced Conference.

== Notable dates ==
March 9: Import Carlton McKinney scored when it mattered most as Añejo Rum 65ers slipped past Presto Ice Cream, 119-117, for their first win of the season in two games, after losing to sister team San Miguel Beer two nights before.

April 11: Añejo survived another do-or-die situation in their last game in the eliminations against Alaska, the Rum Masters stayed alive and force a playoff with the Airmen following a 117-107 victory.

August 1: Robert Jaworski topscored with 18 points and starred in two crucial plays in the last minute, resulted to a triple by Chito Loyzaga and a runaway basket by Philip Cezar for the final count, a 101-98 victory over San Miguel for their second win in the semifinals of the All-Filipino Conference and their fourth straight triumph since the eliminations.

October 15: Carlos Briggs sizzled for 81 points with five three-point shots in a dazzling one-man show, leading Añejo to a pulsating 135-132 victory over Formula Shell. Briggs became the fifth player in PBA history to pass the 80-point mark.

October 24: Carlos Briggs converted nine three-point shots and finished with 64 points as Añejo got back at Purefoods, 150-137, in the second round of eliminations. The win was the fourth straight for the Rum Masters and improved their won-loss standings to 5-3.

November 5: Añejo beats Presto Tivoli in another overtime-thriller, 144-143, for their second win in the semifinals, Carlos Briggs was the top scorer with 71 points.

November 19: Añejo Rum needed an extra five minutes to outlast Alaska Milk, 145-142, as the Rum Masters keeps its hopes alive for a finals seat.

November 21: In yet another great escape, Carlos Briggs' late-game heroics kept Añejo's finals hopes alive with a 135-134 triumph over Purefoods, the Hotdogs were 21 seconds away from a finals clash with San Miguel Beer when they led by four, 134-130, on Alvin Patrimonio's short stab. Briggs, who finish with 75 points, stole the ball from Dindo Pumaren with 18 seconds left and completed a three-point play off a foul by Jojo Lastimosa with eight seconds remaining that capped a stirring comeback by the Rum Masters.

November 26: Añejo advances into the Third Conference finals with a 113-112 win over Purefoods Hotdogs, which played sans import Dexter Shouse in their knockout game. The Rum Masters will play sister team and grandslam-bound San Miguel Beermen in the finals of the season-ending conference.

== Won-loss records vs Opponents ==
Team	Win	Loss	1st (Open)	2nd (All-Filipino)	3rd (Reinforced)
Alaska	3	8	1-2	1-3	1-3
Presto	5	3	1-1	2-0	2-2
Purefoods	5	6	0-2	2-2	3-2
San Miguel	6	9	0-2	2-2	4-5
Shell	7	6	1-1	4-5	2-0
RP Team	1	0	N/A	1-0	N/A
Total	27	32	3-8	12-12	12-12

== Roster ==
1989 Añejo Rum 65ers roster
Players

Pos.	#	POB	Name	Height	Weight	DOB (YYYY–MM–DD)	From
C	4	(Philippines)	Peter Aguilar	6 ft 5 in (1.96 m)			Trinity
F	6	(Philippines)	Dondon Ampalayo	6 ft 3 in (1.91 m)	190 lb (86 kg)		USJ–R
G	7	(Philippines)	Robert Jaworski	6 ft 1 in (1.85 m)	192 lb (87 kg)		UE
G	9	(Philippines)	Leo Isaac	6 ft 1 in (1.85 m)	172 lb (78 kg)		Mapúa
F	10	(Philippines)	Nandy Garcia	6 ft 2 in (1.88 m)			Adamson
F	12	(Philippines)	Dante Gonzalgo	6 ft 2 in (1.88 m)	185 lb (84 kg)		Lyceum
F	13	(Philippines)	Harmon Codinera	6 ft 3 in (1.91 m)			Far Eastern
G	14	(Philippines)	Joey Loyzaga	6 ft 1 in (1.85 m)			San Beda
F/C	15	(Philippines)	Rey Cuenco	6 ft 4 in (1.93 m)	175 lb (79 kg)		GAUF
G	17	(Philippines)	Rudy Distrito	5 ft 11 in (1.80 m)	165 lb (75 kg)		UE
F	18	(Philippines)	Philip Cezar	6 ft 3 in (1.91 m)	180 lb (82 kg)		JRC
C	22	(Philippines)	Romulo Mamaril	6 ft 6 in (1.98 m)			Mapúa
F/C	30	(Philippines)	Cayetano Salazar	6 ft 5 in (1.96 m)			Letran
F	41	(Philippines)	Chito Loyzaga	6 ft 2 in (1.88 m)	210 lb (95 kg)		San Beda

Coaches

Head coach

- (Philippines) Robert Jaworski

Assistant coach(es)

- (Philippines) Rino Salazar

Team manager

- (Philippines) Bernabe Navarro

Legend

- (C) Team captain
- Injured

=== Imports ===
Name	Conference	No.	Pos.	Ht.	College
Carlton McKinney ^{played two games}	Open Conference	24	Guard-Forward	6"3'	Southern Methodist University
Daren Queenan ^{replaces Carlton McKinney}	Open Conference	24	Forward	6"3'	Lehigh University
Carlos Briggs	Reinforced Conference	24	Guard-Forward	5"11'	Baylor University
