= Ennis Whatley =

American basketball player (born 1962)

Personal information
- Born: August 11, 1962 (age 64) Birmingham, Alabama, U.S.
- Listed height: 6 ft 3 in (1.91 m)
- Listed weight: 178 lb (81 kg)

Career information
- High school: Phillips (Birmingham, Alabama)
- College: Alabama (1981–1983)
- NBA draft: 1983: 1st round, 13th overall pick
- Drafted by: Kansas City Kings
- Playing career: 1983–1998
- Position: Point guard
- Number: 3, 2, 1, 4, 8

Career history
- 1983–1985: Chicago Bulls
- 1985: Cleveland Cavaliers
- 1986: Washington Bullets
- 1986: San Antonio Spurs
- 1986–1987: Washington Bullets
- 1987–1988: Mississippi Jets
- 1988: Atlanta Hawks
- 1988–1989: Wichita Falls Texans
- 1989: Los Angeles Clippers
- 1989: San Miguel Beermen
- 1990: Presto Tivolis
- 1990–1991: Wichita Falls Texans
- 1992: Portland Trail Blazers
- 1992–1993: Hapoel Gvat/Yagur
- 1993–1995: Atlanta Hawks
- 1996–1997: Connecticut Pride
- 1997: Portland Trail Blazers
- 1997–1998: Žalgiris Kaunas

Career highlights
- Lithuanian League champion (1998); PBA champion (1989 Reinforced); CBA Playoff/Finals MVP (1991); All-CBA Second Team (1989); Second-team All-American – NABC (1983); Third-team All-American – AP, UPI (1983); First-team All-SEC (1983); First-team Parade All-American (1981); Fourth-team Parade All-American (1980); Alabama Mr. Basketball (1981); McDonald's All-American (1981)
- Stats at NBA.com
- Stats at Basketball Reference

Ennis Whatley (born August 11, 1962) is an American former professional basketball player who was selected by the Kansas City Kings in the first round (13th pick overall) of the 1983 NBA draft. Whatley played in ten National Basketball Association (NBA) seasons. A 6-foot-3-inch (1.91 m), 177-pound (80 kg) guard, he played for the Chicago Bulls, the Cleveland Cavaliers, Washington Bullets, San Antonio Spurs, Atlanta Hawks, Los Angeles Clippers and Portland Trail Blazers.

Whatley's best year as a professional came during the 1986–87 season as a Bullet, when he appeared in 73 games and averaged 8.5 points per game (PPG). In 10 NBA seasons, Whatley played in a total of 385 games and scored 2,150 points, (5.6 PPG).

He also held the Bulls franchise career record of 7.0 assists per game (1,043 assists in 150 games), until Josh Giddey surpassed the record since joining the Bulls in 2024.

Born and raised in Birmingham, Alabama, Whatley attended Phillips High School and the University of Alabama. He was friends with NBA player Matt Fish growing up.

Whatley played in the Continental Basketball Association (CBA) for the Mississippi Monarchs during the 1987–88 season, the Wichita Falls Texans during the 1988–89 and 1990–91 seasons, and the Connecticut Pride during the 1996–97 season. He was selected as the CBA Playoff/Finals Most Valuable Player in 1991 and named to the All-CBA Second Team in 1989.

== Career in the Philippines ==
Whatley had experienced some success in the Philippines when he played as an import in the Philippine Basketball Association in 1989. In the Reinforced Conference of that season, he helped the San Miguel Beermen become only the second team in PBA history to achieve the Grand Slam by leading them to the third and final conference championship. He came in as a replacement for former Indiana University standout and future Sacramento Kings coach Keith Smart, who was sent home after five games.

Whatley would return to the PBA in 1990, playing for Presto Tivoli.

== Life After Basketball ==
Whatley is now a public speaker for Inspire LLP.

== Career statistics ==
Legend
GP	Games played	GS	Games started	MPG	Minutes per game
FG%	Field goal percentage	3P%	3-point field goal percentage	FT%	Free throw percentage
RPG	Rebounds per game	APG	Assists per game	SPG	Steals per game
BPG	Blocks per game	PPG	Points per game	**Bold**	Career high
*	Led the league

=== NBA ===
==== Regular season ====
Year	Team	GP	GS	MPG	FG%	3P%	FT%	RPG	APG	SPG	BPG	PPG
1983–84	Chicago	80	**73**	**27.0**	.469	.000	.730	2.5	**8.3**	**1.5**	.2	8.4
1984–85	Chicago	70	44	19.8	.447	.111	.791	1.4	5.4	.9	.1	5.0
1985–86	Cleveland	8	0	8.3	.474	–	.571	.9	1.6	.6	.0	2.8
1985–86	Washington	4	0	6.8	.357	–	.333	1.8	1.8	.0	**.3**	2.8
1985–86	San Antonio	2	1	7.0	.500	–	–	.0	1.5	.0	.0	1.0
1986–87	Washington	73	72	24.9	.478	.000	.764	**2.7**	5.4	1.3	.1	**8.5**
1987–88	Atlanta	5	0	4.8	.444	–	.750	.8	.4	.4	.0	2.2
1988–89	L.A. Clippers	8	0	11.3	.364	–	**.909**	2.0	2.8	.9	.1	4.3
1991–92	Portland	23	0	9.1	.412	.000	.871	.9	1.5	.6	.1	3.0
1993–94	Atlanta	**82***	1	12.2	**.508**	.000	.788	1.2	2.2	.7	.0	3.6
1994–95	Atlanta	27	2	10.8	.453	**.250**	.625	1.1	2.0	.7	.0	2.6
1996–97	Portland	3	0	7.3	.500	–	–	1.0	1.0	.0	.0	1.3
Career		385	193	18.5	.468	.097	.755	1.8	4.6	1.0	.1	5.6

==== Playoffs ====
Year	Team	GP	GS	MPG	FG%	3P%	FT%	RPG	APG	SPG	BPG	PPG
1987	Washington	2	**2**	**16.0**	.250	–	–	**1.5**	**3.0**	**1.0**	.0	**3.0**
1992	Portland	**15**	0	6.4	.300	.000	**1.000**	.7	.9	.5	.0	1.1
1994	Atlanta	11	0	10.3	**.321**	–	.750	1.3	1.1	.6	.0	2.2
1995	Atlanta	3	0	6.3	.000	–	–	1.3	.3	.0	.0	.0
Career		31	2	8.4	.281	.000	.833	1.0	1.0	.5	.0	1.5

== See also ==
- List of National Basketball Association players with most assists in a game
