= 1989 PBA Open Conference =

- Duration: March 5 – May 21, 1989
- TV partner(s): Vintage Sports (PTV)

Finals
- Champions: San Miguel Beermen
- Runners-up: Formula Shell Zoom Masters

Awards
- Best Import: Bobby Parks (Formula Shell Zoom Masters)

PBA Open Conference chronology
- < 1988 1990 >

PBA conference chronology
- < 1988 Reinforced 1989 All-Filipino >

The 1989 Philippine Basketball Association (PBA) Open Conference was the first conference of the 1989 PBA season. It started on March 5 and ended on May 21, 1989. The tournament is an import-laden format, which requires an import or a pure-foreign player for each team.

== Format ==
The following format will be observed for the duration of the conference:

- Double-round robin eliminations; 10 games per team; Teams are then seeded by basis on win–loss records.
- Team with the worst record after the elimination round will be eliminated.
- Semifinals will be two round robin affairs with the five remaining teams. Results from the elimination round will be carried over.
- The top two teams in the semifinals advance to the best of seven finals. The last two teams dispute the third-place trophy in a best-of-five playoff.

== Elimination round ==
Pos	Team	W	L	PCT	GB	Qualification
1	San Miguel Beermen	10	0	1.000	—	Semifinal round
2	Presto Ice Cream	5	5	.500	5	Semifinal round
3	Formula Shell Zoom Masters	5	5	.500	5	Semifinal round
4	Purefoods Hotdogs	4	6	.400	6	Semifinal round
5	Alaska Milkmen	3	7	.300 (Note: Semifinal berth playoff: Alaska 133–120 Añejo)	7	Semifinal round
6	Añejo Rum 65ers	3	7	.300	7	

== Semifinal round ==
Overall standings
Pos	Team	W	L	PCT	GB	Qualification
1	San Miguel Beermen	14	4	.778	—	Advance to the Finals
2	Formula Shell Zoom Masters	10	8	.556	4	Advance to the Finals
3	Presto Ice Cream	9	9	.500	5	Proceed to third place playoffs
4	Alaska Milkmen	7	11	.389 (Note: Head-to-head record: Alaska 2–2 Purefoods, Alaska +9)	7	Proceed to third place playoffs
5	Purefoods Hotdogs	7	11	.389	7	

Notes:

Semifinal round standings
Pos	Team	W	L
1	Formula Shell Zoom Masters	5	3
2	San Miguel Beermen	4	4
3	Presto Ice Cream	4	4
4	Alaska Milkmen	4	4
5	Purefoods Hotdogs	3	5

== Third place playoffs ==
Vintage

May 11

Presto Ice Cream 112, Alaska Milkmen 133

The ULTRA, Pasig

Vintage

May 14

Presto Ice Cream 126, Alaska Milkmen 135

The ULTRA, Pasig

Vintage

May 16

Presto Ice Cream 129, Alaska Milkmen 135
Alaska wins series, 3–0

The ULTRA, Pasig

== Finals ==
Vintage

May 11

San Miguel Beermen 146, Formula Shell Zoom Masters 132

The ULTRA, Pasig

Vintage

May 14

San Miguel Beermen 114, Formula Shell Zoom Masters 107

The ULTRA, Pasig

Vintage

May 16

San Miguel Beermen 130, Formula Shell Zoom Masters 124

The ULTRA, Pasig

Vintage

May 18

San Miguel Beermen 104, Formula Shell Zoom Masters 115

The ULTRA, Pasig

Vintage

May 21

San Miguel Beermen 123, Formula Shell Zoom Masters 105
San Miguel wins series, 4–1

The ULTRA, Pasig
