= 1989 Alaska Milkmen season =

- Head coach: Bogs Adornado (First Conference); Joel Aquino (interim, First Conference); Tim Cone
- General manager: Joel Aquino
- Owner: Alaska Milk Corporation

Open Conference results
- Record: 11–11 (50%)
- Place: 3rd
- Playoff finish: Semifinals

All-Filipino Conference results
- Record: 8–11 (42.1%)
- Place: 5th
- Playoff finish: Semifinals

Reinforced Conference results
- Record: 11–11 (50%)
- Place: 3rd
- Playoff finish: Semifinals

Alaska Milkmen seasons

The 1989 Alaska Milkmen season was the 4th season of the franchise in the Philippine Basketball Association (PBA).

== Transactions ==
Players Added	Signed	Former team
Paul Alvarez ^{Rookie}	Off-season	N/A
Boy Cabahug ^{Rookie}	Off-season	N/A
Ric-Ric Marata ^{Rookie}	Off-season	N/A
Edgardo Roque, Jr ^{Rookie}	Off-season	N/A
Eric Altamirano ^{Rookie free agent}	Off-season	N/A
Abet Guidaben	Off-season	Purefoods Hotdogs

== Occurrences ==
Going into their April 13 do-or-die encounter for the last semifinals berth against Añejo Rum 65, coach William "Bogs" Adornado was asked not to sit on the Alaska bench, the Airmen had an "open coaching among players" during that game with assistant Aric del Rosario and team owner Wilfred Uytengsu calling the shots. The next day in a meeting between Adornado, team manager Joel Aquino and owner Wilfred Uytengsu, Adornado was advised by the Alaska management to resign and gave up his position. In a letter of resignation, Adornado accepted responsibility for the team's dismal showing but blamed the management for their failure to get the services of a suitable import, Aquino handled the team starting the semifinals and for the rest of the first conference.

Tim Cone, a member of the vintage panelists, guided the Airmen to a third-place finish in the Open Conference and soon accepted coaching chores for Alaska starting the Fiesta All-Filipino.

== Notable dates ==
March 21: Alaska snapped a four-game losing skein with a 105–104 squeaker over Añejo Rum 65. Rookie Elmer Cabahug banged in a 15-foot jumper in the last five seconds to salvage the victory and dealt Añejo its fourth loss in five outings.

March 28: Rookies Paul Alvarez and Ricric Marata didn't disappoint when the Milkmen preserve a 131–129 victory over Purefoods for their second win in a row. The Hotdogs came back from 20 points down in the last four minutes and Alaska coach Bogs Adornado failed to call a timeout on time when Purefoods gunner Al Solis sunk a three-pointer that closed the gap at 125–127 with 31 seconds left. Alaska import Carl Lott scored his highest output of 40 points in six games he played.

April 4: Sean Chambers, who first came to the Philippines two years ago as part of the IBA selection and who replaces Carl Lott, scored five of Alaska's 10 points in the last 1:18 as they roll back Presto Ice Cream, 124-120, to register their third win against five losses.

April 13: Alaska Milk overwhelmed Añejo Rum, 133-120, in the playoff for the fifth and last seat in the semifinal round.

August 13: Alaska did a favor for San Miguel and Purefoods with its 105–97 win over Añejo that dashed the finals hopes of the 65ers. Milkmen Willie Pearson provided the big difference in the last 1:20 with his three-pointer and his daring drive off Dante Gonzalgo for a 102–97 advantage.

== Won-loss records vs Opponents ==
Team	Win	Loss	1st (Open)	2nd (All-Filipino)	3rd (Reinforced)
Anejo	8	3	2-1	3-1	3-1
Presto	11	2	6-1	2-0	3-1
Purefoods	7	9	2-2	0-4	5-3
San Miguel	1	11	0-4	1-3	0-4
Shell	2	8	1-3	1-3	0-2
RP Team	1	0	N/A	1-0	N/A
Total	30	33	11-11	8-11	11-11

== Roster ==
1989 Alaska Milkmen roster
Players

Pos.	#	POB	Name	Height	Weight	DOB (YYYY–MM–DD)	From
F	3	(United States)	William Pearson	6 ft 2 in (1.88 m)			Chaminade
G	6	(Philippines)	Biboy Ravanes	6 ft 0 in (1.83 m)			Cebu
G	9	(Philippines)	Boy Cabahug	5 ft 11 in (1.80 m)			Visayas
C	10	(Philippines)	Adriano Polistico	6 ft 7 in (2.01 m)			Letran
G	11	(Philippines)	Eric Altamirano	5 ft 9 in (1.75 m)			UP Diliman
F	12	(Philippines)	Rey Lazaro	6 ft 1 in (1.85 m)			Far Eastern
F	13	(Philippines)	Elpidio Villamin	6 ft 3 in (1.91 m)
C	14	(Philippines)	Abet Guidaben	6 ft 5 in (1.96 m)			USJ–R
F/C	15	(Philippines)	Ricky Relosa	6 ft 3 in (1.91 m)			Mapúa
F	21	(Philippines)	Paul Alvarez	6 ft 0 in (1.83 m)			San Sebastian
G	22	(Philippines)	Frankie Lim	5 ft 10 in (1.78 m)			San Beda
G	23	(Philippines)	Ric-Ric Marata	5 ft 8 in (1.73 m)			Southwestern-U
G/F	25	(Philippines)	Dondi Roque	6 ft 2 in (1.88 m)			UP Diliman
F	26	(Philippines)	Joel Santos	6 ft 3 in (1.91 m)			San Beda

Coaches

Head coach

- (United States) Tim Cone

Assistant coach(es)

- (Philippines) Chot Reyes
- (Philippines) Aric del Rosario

Legend

- (C) Team captain
- Injured

=== Additions ===
Player	Signed	Former team
Joel Santos	October 1989	Presto Tivoli

=== Imports ===
Name	Conference	No.	Pos.	Ht.	College
Carl Lott	Open Conference	7	Forward	6"3'	Texas Christian University
Sean Chambers	Open Conference; Reinforced Conference	20	Forward	6"1'	Cal Poly San Luis Obispo
