= 1989 Purefoods Hotdogs season =

- Head coach: Cris Calilan (until April 18, 1989); Baby Dalupan
- General manager: Domingo Panganiban
- Owner: Ayala Corporation

Open Conference results
- Record: 7–11 (38.9%)
- Place: 5th
- Playoff finish: Semifinals

All-Filipino Conference results
- Record: 16–9 (64%)
- Place: 2nd
- Playoff finish: Finals (lost to SMB)

Reinforced Conference results
- Record: 11–12 (47.8%)
- Place: 4th
- Playoff finish: Semifinals

Purefoods Hotdogs seasons

The 1989 Purefoods Hotdogs season was the 2nd season of the franchise in the Philippine Basketball Association (PBA).

== Transactions ==
Players Added	Signed	Former team
Nelson Asaytono ^{Rookie}	Off-season	N/A
Dindo Pumaren ^{Rookie}	Off-season	N/A
Antonio Dela Cerna ^{Rookie}	Off-season	N/A
Ludovico Valenciano ^{Acquired by giving up their 2nd round pick}	Off-season	Alaska Milkmen

=== Trades ===
Off-season	To Presto Ice Cream Padim Israel, Willie Generalao, Manuel Marquez	To Purefoods Hotdogs Sonny Cabatu, Pido Jarencio

== Occurrences ==
Former Presto coach Baby Dalupan moved over to coach the Purefoods Hotdogs, replacing Cris Calilan, who return to his position as assistant coach. The Maestro began coaching the Hotdogs in their second game in the semifinal round of the Open Conference.

During the third conference, their import Dexter Shouse left the team on a crucial stages in the semifinals with a playoff game against Añejo for the second finals berth looms. Shouse signed a contract to play in the NBA and was banned by the PBA for a repeat of his similar actions in the league, leaving his team first with Shell in 1987.

== Notable dates ==
May 2: Alvin Patrimonio scored 40 points as Purefoods won for the first time over San Miguel in four meetings in the Open Conference via 126–115 victory.

July 18: Purefoods avenged their first round elimination loss to San Miguel by overpowering the Beermen, 125–115, and tied them on top of the standings with seven wins and two losses.

July 23: The Hotdogs' winning streak reach to seven games in a 117–106 victory over Formula Shell and close out the eliminations on top with nine wins and two losses.

October 3: Dexter Shouse scored 38 points, 21 in the first quarter, and Jerry Codinera made an all-time record 11 shot blocks as the Hotdogs gave the San Miguel Beermen their worst beating in a 126–94 rout in both teams' first game in the Reinforced Conference.

November 5: Dindo Pumaren converted on a 20-foot jumper with two seconds left to lift the Hotdogs to a 121–119 overtime win over San Miguel Beermen for their seventh win in 11 games, snapping a three-game slump and regain solo leadership in the semifinal round.

November 9: Purefoods scored their third straight win in the semifinals by winning against Alaska, 116–111, to remain on top of the standings with nine wins and four losses.

== Won-loss records vs Opponents ==
Team	Win	Loss	1st (Open)	2nd (All-Filipino)	3rd (Reinforced)
Alaska	9	7	2-2	4-0	3-5
Anejo	6	5	2-0	2-2	2-3
Presto	6	4	2-2	2-0	2-2
San Miguel	7	11	1-3	4-6	2-2
Shell	5	5	0-4	3-1	2-2
RP Team	1	0	N/A	1-0	N/A
Total	34	32	7-11	16-9	11-12

== Roster ==
1989 Purefoods Hotdogs roster
Players

Pos.	#	POB	Name	Height	Weight	DOB (YYYY–MM–DD)	From
G/F	2	(Philippines)	Alejo Alolor	6 ft 1 in (1.85 m)	160 lb (73 kg)		Visayas
C	5	(Philippines)	Sonny Cabatu	6 ft 5 in (1.96 m)	205 lb (93 kg)		PSBA
G	6	(Philippines)	Jojo Lastimosa	6 ft 1 in (1.85 m)	180 lb (82 kg)		USJ–R
F	7	(Philippines)	Tony Dela Cerna	6 ft 0 in (1.83 m)	170 lb (77 kg)		Baguio
G	8	(Philippines)	Al Solis	5 ft 11 in (1.80 m)	180 lb (82 kg)		Visayas
G	9	(Philippines)	Joshua Villapando	6 ft 1 in (1.85 m)	175 lb (79 kg)		PSBA
G	10	(Philippines)	Dindo Pumaren	5 ft 9 in (1.75 m)	170 lb (77 kg)		La Salle
F	11	(Philippines)	Nelson Asaytono	6 ft 3 in (1.91 m)	220 lb (100 kg)		Manila
G	12	(Philippines)	Glenn Capacio	6 ft 1 in (1.85 m)	185 lb (84 kg)		Far Eastern
C	14	(Philippines)	Jack Tanuan	6 ft 6 in (1.98 m)	215 lb (98 kg)		Far Eastern
F	16	(Philippines)	Alvin Patrimonio	6 ft 3 in (1.91 m)	215 lb (98 kg)		Mapúa
F	17 & 9	(Philippines)	Ludovico Valenciano	6 ft 3 in (1.91 m)	185 lb (84 kg)		USLS
G	25	(Philippines)	Pido Jarencio	5 ft 9 in (1.75 m)	170 lb (77 kg)		UST
C	44	(Philippines)	Jerry Codinera	6 ft 5 in (1.96 m)	245 lb (111 kg)		UE

Coaches

Head coach

- (Philippines) Baby Dalupan

Assistant coach(es)

- (Philippines) Cris Calilan
- (Philippines) Ely Capacio

Legend

- (C) Team captain
- Injured

=== Addition ===
Player	Signed	Former team
Alejo Alolor	June 1989	Crispa 400 (PABL)

=== Imports ===
Name	Conference	No.	Pos.	Ht.	College
Jimmy McClain ^{played five games}	Open Conference	23	Forward	6"3'	University of Central Arkansas
Perry Moss ^{replaces Jimmy McClain}	Open Conference	4	Guard-Forward	6"1'	Northeastern University
Dexter Shouse	Reinforced Conference	3	Guard-Forward	6"1'	University of South Alabama

== Win–loss record ==
Season Rank	GP	Win	Lost	Pct.
2nd Overall	66	34	32	0.515

== Team Milestones ==
1st Runner-Up: All-Filipino Conference
Mythical 1st Team Alvin Patrimonio
Mythical 2nd Team Jerry Codiñera
All Defensive Team Jerry Codiñera, Glenn Capacio
