= 1989 Presto Tivolis season =

- Head coach: Adriano Go; Jimmy Mariano
- General manager: Ignacio Gotao
- Owner: CFC Corporation

Open Conference results
- Record: 9–12 (42.9%)
- Place: 4th
- Playoff finish: Semifinals

All-Filipino Conference results
- Record: 2–9 (18.2%)
- Place: 6th
- Playoff finish: Eliminated

Reinforced Conference results
- Record: 7–11 (38.9%)
- Place: 5th
- Playoff finish: Semifinals

Presto Tivolis seasons

The 1989 Presto Tivolis season was the 15th season of the franchise in the Philippine Basketball Association (PBA). Previously known as Presto Ice Cream Flavor Specialist in the Open Conference.

== Transactions ==
Players Added	Signed	Former team
Manny Victorino ^{Former Presto player, Re-acquired}	Off-season	Shell Rimula-X
Romeo Ang	Off-season	Shell Rimula-X
Zaldy Realubit ^{Rookie}	Off-season	N/A
Hernani Demigillo ^{Rookie}	Off-season	N/A
Marte Saldaña	Off-season	Alaska Milkmen

=== Trades ===
Off-season	To Purefoods Hotdogs Sonny Cabatu, Pido Jarencio	To Presto Ice Cream Padim Israel, Willie Generalao, Manuel Marquez

== Occurrences ==
Assistant Coach Adriano "Bong" Go was named the new head coach of Presto at the start of the season.

Former Presto coach Baby Dalupan, who was given a new task as team manager, accepted the offer to coach the Purefoods Hotdogs during the second week of April, the "Maestro" left the Gokongwei ballclub he led to five championships from 1984 to 1987.

Coach Bong Go was replaced by the comebacking Jimmy Mariano, the team's mentor from 1981 to 1983, at the start of the Third Conference.

== Notable dates ==
March 5: Presto Ice Cream clobbered Alaska Milk, 118–108, at the start of the PBA Open Conference. The Flavor Specialists got off to a rousing start with import Walker Russell, a six-year NBA veteran providing the spark and rookies Zaldy Realubit and Hernani Demigillo adding muscle underneath and trade recruits Manny Victorino and Marte Saldaña scoring the much needed points.

March 12: Rookie Zaldy Realubit leaped from behind Rey Cuenco and Bobby Parks to pluck the big offensive rebound, then scored the marginal gun-beating basket for a 134–132 win by Presto over Formula Shell and gave the Flavor Specialists its second win in three starts.

March 28: Allan Caidic equalled the most points in one quarter (first set by Atoy Co in 1982) by scoring 26 points in the first quarter alone and finish with 42 points to lead Presto Ice Cream to a 123–112 win over Añejo Rum. Import Walker Russell registered his second triple-double of 30 points, 12 rebounds and 12 assists.

April 16: Presto Ice Cream started their semifinal assignment on a high note as they defeated San Miguel Beermen, 109–100, handed the defending Open Conference champions their first taste of defeat after a 10-game sweep in the eliminations.

April 18: The Flavor Specialist scored their second victory in the semifinals with a 131–124 win over Purefoods Hotdogs, spoiling the debut of their former coach Baby Dalupan, who now calls the shots for the Hotdogs.

April 25: Allan Caidic erupted for a conference-high 45 points while Walker Russell dished out his seventh triple-double performance of 41 points, 10 rebounds and 12 assists to bolster Presto's finals chances in a 143–135 win over Formula Shell.

June 29: The Tivolis eked out a 113–108 victory over San Miguel as they snapped the Beermen's three-game winning skein in the All-Filipino Conference. The win was Presto's second in three games.

October 1: In the first game at the start of the third conference, Presto import Terrance Bailey debut with 61 points as the Tivolis defeated Añejo Rum, 153–142, the Rum Masters got an impressive 68 points from Carlos Briggs, their debuting import who is the shortest among the six reinforcements.

November 2: Allan Caidic broke the all-time high scoring mark for locals by scoring 68 of the points in Presto's 175–159 victory over Alaska Milk at the start of the Reinforced Conference semifinal round. Caidic reset Atoy Co's record in individual scoring in one quarter by one point as he finished with 27 and became the league's undoubted top three-point gunner with a record 15 triples, breaking Hills Bros' import Jose Slaughter's 14 hits that was registered two years ago, Caidic also tied Ricardo Brown's output of 41 points in a half in a display of marksmanship that had the capacity crowd roaring in approval, and with Caidic's 15 triples, Presto set an all-time high of 18 three-pointers with Bailey converting two, and Bernardo Carpio converting one, while Terrance Bailey also set an all-time high of 20 assists in that game.

November 12: Terrance Bailey riddled the hotdogs' defenses with smashing drives and stunning dunks and Allan Caidic came alive with 11 points in the fourth quarter as Presto's 1-2 punch led the Tivolis to a come-from-behind 161–153 victory over Purefoods. Bailey topscored with 63 points as he joined forces with Caidic in towing Presto back from a 115–128 deficit in the fourth quarter. The Tivolis stopped the three-game winning run by Purefoods and gained their seventh win in 14 games.

== Won-loss records vs Opponents ==
Team	Win	Loss	1st (Open)	2nd (All-Filipino)	3rd (Reinforced)
Alaska	2	11	1-6	0-2	1-3
Anejo	3	5	1-1	0-2	2-2
Purefoods	4	6	2-2	0-2	2-2
San Miguel	2	8	1-3	1-1	0-4
Shell	6	2	4-0	0-2	2-0
RP Team	1	0	N/A	1-0	N/A
Total	18	32	9-12	2-9	7-11

== Roster ==
Presto Tivoli roster
Players
Coaches

Pos.	No.	Nat.	Name	Ht.	Wt.
C	1	(Philippines)	Manny Victorino	6 ft 5 in (1.96 m)		José Rizal
F	6	(Philippines)	Abe King	6 ft 3 in (1.91 m)		San Beda
G	7	(Philippines)	Arturo Cristobal	6 ft 1 in (1.85 m)		Far Eastern
G/F	8	(Philippines)	Allan Caidic	6 ft 2 in (1.88 m)		UE
G	9	(Philippines)	Onchie dela Cruz	5 ft 11 in (1.80 m)		Philippine Christian
G	10	(Philippines)	Romeo Ang	6 ft 1 in (1.85 m)		Letran
C	15	(Philippines)	Hernani Demigillo	6 ft 5 in (1.96 m)		San Sebastian
F	17	(Philippines)	Padim Israel	6 ft 2 in (1.88 m)		Ateneo
G	18	(Philippines)	Lawrence Merced	6 ft 0 in (1.83 m)		Adamson
G	24	(Philippines)	Willie Generalao	5 ft 8 in (1.73 m)		Visayas
F	25	(Philippines)	Dennis Abbatuan	6 ft 2 in (1.88 m)		José Rizal
C	28	(Philippines)	Zaldy Realubit	6 ft 5 in (1.96 m)		USJ–R
F	29	(Philippines)	Bernardo Carpio	6 ft 3 in (1.91 m)		Ateneo
G	51	(Philippines)	Bernie Fabiosa	5 ft 9 in (1.75 m)		UE
F	71	(Philippines)	Manuel Marquez	6 ft 2 in (1.88 m)		San Beda
G	77	(Philippines)	Marte Saldaña	5 ft 11 in (1.80 m)		Far Eastern

Head coach

- (Philippines) Jimmy Mariano

Assistant coach(es)

- (Philippines) Bong Go
- (Philippines) Nap Flores

Team manager

- (Philippines) Ignacio Gotao

Legend

- (C) Team captain
- Injured

=== Additions ===
Player	Signed	Former team
Lawrence Merced ^{Former player signed to a short-term contract}	July 1989	N/A
Bernie Fabiosa ^{Re-acquired}	July 1989	Crispa 400 (PABL)
Onchie Dela Cruz	October 1989	Shell

=== Subtraction ===
Player	Signed	New team
Joel Santos	October 1989	Alaska

=== Imports ===
Name	Conference	No.	Pos.	Ht.	College
Walker Russell	Open Conference	3	Guard	6"3'	Western Michigan University
Terrance Bailey	Reinforced Conference	21	Forward-Guard	6"1'	Wagner College
