= 1989 PBA Reinforced Conference =

Philippine basketball tournament

- Duration: October 1 – December 12, 1989
- TV partner(s): Vintage Sports (PTV)

Finals
- Champions: San Miguel Beermen
- Runners-up: Añejo Rum 65ers

Awards
- Best Import: Carlos Briggs (Añejo Rum 65ers)

PBA Reinforced Conference chronology
- < 1988 2003 >

PBA conference chronology
- < 1989 All-Filipino 1990 First >

The 1989 Philippine Basketball Association (PBA) Reinforced Conference was the third and last conference of the 1989 PBA season. It started on October 1 and ended on December 12, 1989. The tournament is an import-laden format, which requires each team to have an import standing 6 feet 1 inch.

== Format ==
The following format will be observed for the duration of the conference:

- Double-round robin eliminations; 10 games per team; Teams are then seeded by basis on win–loss records.
- Team with the worst record after the elimination round will be eliminated.
- Semifinals will be two round robin affairs with the five remaining teams. Results from the elimination round will be carried over.
- The top two teams in the semifinals advance to the best of seven finals. The last two teams dispute the third-place trophy in a best-of-five playoff.

== Elimination round ==
Pos	Team	W	L	PCT	GB	Qualification
1	San Miguel Beermen	6	4	.600	—	Semifinal round
2	Purefoods Hotdogs	6	4	.600	—	Semifinal round
3	Presto Tivolis	5	5	.500	1	Semifinal round
4	Añejo Rum 65ers	5	5	.500	1	Semifinal round
5	Alaska Milkmen	5	5	.500	1	Semifinal round
6	Formula Shell Zoom Masters	3	7	.300	3	

== Semifinal round ==
Overall standings
Pos	Team	W	L	PCT	GB	Qualification
1	San Miguel Beermen	12	6	.667	—	Advance to the Finals (Note: If a team outside the top two teams wins at least five semifinal round games, then it and the second-placed team will playoff for the last Finals berth; otherwise, the top 2 teams qualify outright.)
2	Purefoods Hotdogs	10	8	.556 (Note: Head-to-head record: Purefoods 2–2 Añejo, Purefoods +6)	2	Guaranteed Finals berth playoff
3	Añejo Rum 65ers	10	8	.556	2	Qualify to Finals berth playoff
4	Alaska Milkmen	8	10	.444	4	Proceed to third place playoffs
5	Presto Tivolis	7	11	.389	5	

Notes:

Semifinal round standings
Pos	Team	W	L	Qualification
1	San Miguel Beermen	6	2	
2	Añejo Rum 65ers	5	3	Qualify to Finals berth playoff (Note: San Miguel advanced to the Finals outright as #1 seeded team; Finals berth playoff: Añejo 113–112 Purefoods)
3	Purefoods Hotdogs	4	4	
4	Alaska Milkmen	3	5	
5	Presto Tivolis	2	6	

== Third place playoffs ==
Vintage

November 28

Purefoods Hotdogs 109, Alaska Milkmen 116
Scoring by quarter: 30-16, 27-31, 38-32, 21-30
Pts: Alvin Patrimonio 31	Pts: Sean Chambers 53

The ULTRA, Pasig

Vintage

November 30

Purefoods Hotdogs 114, Alaska Milkmen 108

The ULTRA, Pasig

Vintage

December 7

Purefoods Hotdogs 112, Alaska Milkmen 123
Scoring by quarter: 30-24, 30-30, 34-31, 29-27
Pts: Jojo Lastimosa 30	Pts: Sean Chambers 34

The ULTRA, Pasig

Vintage

December 10

Purefoods Hotdogs 102, Alaska Milkmen 126
Alaska wins series, 3–1

The ULTRA, Pasig

== Finals ==
Vintage

November 28

San Miguel Beermen 134, Añejo Rum 65ers 125

The ULTRA, Pasig

Vintage

November 30

San Miguel Beermen 140, Añejo Rum 65ers 134

The ULTRA, Pasig

Vintage

December 7

San Miguel Beermen 134, Añejo Rum 65ers 138

The ULTRA, Pasig

Vintage

December 10

San Miguel Beermen 150, Añejo Rum 65ers 134

The ULTRA, Pasig

Vintage

December 12

San Miguel Beermen 122, Añejo Rum 65ers 111
San Miguel wins series, 4–1

The ULTRA, Pasig
