= 1989 Formula Shell Zoom Masters season =

- Head coach: Dante Silverio
- General manager: Charlie Favis
- Owner: Pilipinas Shell Inc.

Open Conference results
- Record: 11–12 (47.8%)
- Place: 2nd
- Playoff finish: Finals (lost to SMB)

All-Filipino Conference results
- Record: 13–11 (54.2%)
- Place: 3rd
- Playoff finish: Semifinals

Reinforced Conference results
- Record: 3–7 (30%)
- Place: 6th
- Playoff finish: Eliminated

Formula Shell Zoom Masters seasons

The 1989 Formula Shell Zoom Masters season was the 5th season of the franchise in the Philippine Basketball Association (PBA).

== Transactions ==
Players Added	Signed	Former team
Benjie Paras ^{Rookie}	Off-season	N/A
Jerry Ruiz ^{Rookie}	Off-season	N/A
Calvin Tuadles ^{Rookie}	Off-season	N/A
Tim Coloso	Off-season	Alaska Milk
Arnie Tuadles	Off-season	Presto Ice Cream

== Awards ==
- Benjie Paras makes history by becoming the first PBA player to win both Rookie of the year (ROY) honors and the Most Valuable Player (MVP) trophy.
- Bobby Parks won his third Best Import Award during the PBA Open Conference.

== Notable dates ==
March 7: Rookie and number one draft pick Benjie Paras made up for uninspiring debut in their losing cause to San Miguel in the opener by scoring 23 points and team up with Bobby Parks, who poured in 61 points to give the Zoom Masters their first win of the season, routing an off-form Purefoods Hotdogs, 142-110.

March 14: Bobby Parks scored 58 points as Formula Shell beats Alaska, which absorbed its fourth setback, 168-157 in overtime, for their second win in four games.

May 4: Formula Shell arranged a finals rematch with San Miguel in the Open Conference by beating the Beermen, 148-125, and ended the hopes of Presto Ice Cream, which lost to Alaska two days before, to gain at least a tie for a playoff.

June 22: The Zoom Masters scored their first win in two outings in the All-Filipino Conference, routing the Philippine national team, 151-124.

July 11: Rookie Romeo dela Rosa fired 39 points to lead the Zoom Masters to a 124-122 win over Añejo Rum and improved their standings to four wins and three losses.

August 10: Coming off four straight losses in the semifinals and already out of the finals contention, the Zoom Masters upsets Purefoods Hotdogs, 113-106. Rookie Romeo dela Rosa scored his personal-best 40 points.

August 15: Rookie Benjie Paras banged in a conference-high 44 points and fellow rookie Romeo dela Rosa added 34 points as Shell defeats Alaska, 136-129, and finish the semifinal round of the All-Filipino Conference with a 10-9 won-loss slate, winning their last three games.

October 1: Import Steve Burtt scored 43 points while Benjie Paras added 39 points and grabbed 22 rebounds as Formula Shell beats Alaska, 128-117, for their first win at the start of the Reinforced Conference.

October 26: Formula Shell defeated San Miguel, 136-123, as they finally snapped out of a seven-game losing streak after an opening day win. The victory was the Zoom Masters' second in nine games as rookie Benjie Paras scored a conference-high 50 points, duplicating his earlier 50-point output in the first conference.

== Won-loss records vs Opponents ==
Team	Win	Loss	1st (Open)	2nd (All-Filipino)	3rd (Reinforced)
Alaska	8	2	3-1	3-1	2-0
Anejo	6	7	1-1	5-4	0-2
Presto	2	6	0-4	2-0	0-2
Purefoods	5	5	4-0	1-3	0-2
San Miguel	5	10	3-6	1-3	1-1
RP Team	1	0	N/A	1-0	N/A
Total	27	30	11-12	13-11	3-7

== Roster ==
1989 Formula Shell Zoom Masters roster
Players

Pos.	#	POB	Name	Height	Weight	DOB (YYYY–MM–DD)	From
G	1	(Philippines)	Jaime Manansala	5 ft 11 in (1.80 m)			UE
F	2	(Philippines)	Jay Ramirez	6 ft 2 in (1.88 m)			Visayas
F	3	(Philippines)	Edgardo Cordero	6 ft 4 in (1.93 m)			UST
G	5	(Philippines)	Ronnie Magsanoc	5 ft 9 in (1.75 m)			UP Diliman
G/F	6	(Philippines)	Aurelio Jalmasco	5 ft 11 in (1.80 m)			FEATI
F	8	(Philippines)	Jerry Ruiz	6 ft 2 in (1.88 m)			Letran
G	9	(Philippines)	Onchie dela Cruz	5 ft 11 in (1.80 m)			Philippine Christian
G/F	10	(Philippines)	Freddie Hubalde	6 ft 1 in (1.85 m)			Mapúa
F	11	(Philippines)	Arnie Tuadles	6 ft 2 in (1.88 m)			Visayas
F	12	(Philippines)	Romeo Dela Rosa	6 ft 2 in (1.88 m)			Southwestern-U
G	13	(Philippines)	Leo Austria	5 ft 10 in (1.78 m)			Lyceum
C	14	(Philippines)	Benjie Paras	6 ft 5 in (1.96 m)			UP Diliman
F	16	(Philippines)	Angelito Esguerra	6 ft 1 in (1.85 m)			Letran
C	19	(Philippines)	Ed Ducut	6 ft 5 in (1.96 m)			Letran
G/F	32	(Philippines)	Timoteo Coloso	6 ft 2 in (1.88 m)			Letran
G	33	(Philippines)	Calvin Tuadles	5 ft 11 in (1.80 m)			Southwestern-U

Coaches

Head coach

- (Philippines) Dante Silverio

Assistant coach(es)

- (Philippines) Arlene Rodriguez

Legend

- (C) Team captain
- Injured

=== Trades ===
April 1989	To Añejo Rum Rey Cuenco	To Shell Romeo dela Rosa ^{Añejo draftee}

=== Additions ===
Player	Signed	Former team
Ed Ducut	June 1989	Agfa Colors (PABL)

=== Subtractions ===
Player	Signed	New team
Onchie dela Cruz	October 1989	Presto Tivolis

=== Imports ===
Name	Conference	No.	Pos.	Ht.	College
Bobby Parks	Open Conference	22	Forward	6"3'	Memphis State University
Steve Burtt ^{played five games}	Reinforced Conference	15	Guard-Forward	6"1'	Iona College
Andy Grosvenor ^{replaces Steve Burtt}	Reinforced Conference	21	Guard-Forward	6"1'	
