= Carlos Briggs =

American basketball player and coach (born 1963)

Personal information
- Born: March 2, 1963 (age 63) Nashua, New Hampshire, U.S.
- Listed height: 6 ft 1 in (1.85 m)
- Listed weight: 185 lb (84 kg)

Career information
- High school: Benedictine (Detroit, Michigan)
- College: Schoolcraft (1982–1984) Baylor (1984–1986)
- NBA draft: 1986: 4th round, 79th overall pick
- Drafted by: San Antonio Spurs
- Playing career: 1986–1989
- Position: Point guard
- Coaching career: 1995–present

Career history

Playing
- 1988–1989: Rockford Lightning
- 1989: Añejo Rum 65

Coaching
- 1995–1996: Waxahachie HS (asst.)
- 1996–1997: Cedar Hill HS (asst.)
- 1997–2006: Schoolcraft College
- 2007–2012: Detroit Mercy (asst.)
- 2014–2015: Trinity Valley CC (asst.)
- 2015–2017: McLennan CC (asst.)
- 2017–2019: Florida A&M (asst.)
- Stats at Basketball Reference

Carlos Mitchell Briggs (born March 2, 1963) is an American former professional basketball player from Detroit, Michigan. Since retiring from professional basketball, Carlos Briggs has enjoyed a successful coaching career at the high school and collegiate levels, and was most recently an assistant coach at Florida A&M.

== Basketball career ==
After high school, he stayed in Michigan to play two years for Schoolcraft College during his freshman (1982–83) and sophomore (1983–84) seasons. Briggs led the nation in scoring both years, averaging 30.1 points per game his freshman year and 34.2 points his sophomore year. He was a JUCO All-American in 1983–84.

Briggs transferred to Baylor University (an NCAA Division I school) in 1984–85 and contributed 20.4 ppg and 3.5 apg for the Bears. Briggs was the fourth round draft pick for the San Antonio Spurs in 1986.

He played for the Rockford Lightning in the Continental Basketball Association in the 1988–89 season and had a brief stint with the Youngstown Pride in the World Basketball League.

== Philippine stint ==
Carlos Briggs went to play for the most popular ballclub Añejo Rum 65 in the Philippine Basketball Association from October to December 1989, averaging an incredible 62.1 points in 24 games, leading his team to a second-place finish, he made a personal record in that conference, once hitting 89 points in a single game.
