= 1980 U-Tex Wranglers season =

1980 U/Tex Wranglers season
- Head coach: Tommy Manotoc
- Owner(s): Universal Textile Mills

Open Conference results
- Record: 18–11 (62.1%)
- Place: 1st
- Playoff finish: Champion

Invitational Conference results
- Record: 0–8 (0%)
- Place: 5th
- Playoff finish: N/A

All Filipino Conference results
- Record: 6–9 (40%)
- Place: 5th
- Playoff finish: Round of six

U/Tex Wranglers seasons

The 1980 U/Tex Wranglers season was the 6th season of the franchise in the Philippine Basketball Association (PBA).

== Transactions ==
After playing seven games with Crispa Walk Tall in the Open Conference, the Jeans Makers gave up and released two-time MVP William "Bogs" Adornado to U/Tex Wranglers.

== Championship ==
U/Tex won the Open Conference title for their second PBA crown in three years by defeating Toyota Tamaraws, 99–98, in the deciding Game Five of the finals series best known for the "last 16 seconds". The Wranglers finish the four-team semifinals in a tie with Walk Tall Jeans and Toyota with similar four wins and two losses. U/Tex enters the championship round with a superior quotient, leaving the other two teams to dispute the second finals berth.

== Scoring record ==
November 23: William "Bogs" Adornado achieved a milestone by tying the record for most points by a local player shared with Danny Florencio while playing for Seven-up in 1977 by scoring 64 points in U/Tex' 126–111 win over San Miguel Beer.

== Win–loss record vs opponents ==
| Teams | Win | Loss | 1st (Open) | 2nd (Invitational) | 3rd (All-Filipino) |
| Galleon Shippers | 1 | 2 | 1-1 | N/A | 0–1 |
| Gilbey’s Gin | 2 | 2 | 2-0 | N/A | 0–2 |
| Great Taste / Presto | 3 | 2 | 2-2 | N/A | 1–0 |
| Honda | 3 | 1 | 1-1 | N/A | 2–0 |
| Royal / San Miguel | 4 | 0 | 2-0 | N/A | 2–0 |
| Tanduay | 2 | 2 | 2-0 | N/A | 0–2 |
| Tefilin | 3 | 0 | 2-0 | N/A | 1–0 |
| Toyota | 4 | 9 | 4–5 | 0–2 | 0–2 |
| Walk Tall / Crispa | 2 | 6 | 2-2 | 0–2 | 0–2 |
| Adidas (France) | 0 | 2 | N/A | 0–2 | N/A |
| Nicholas Stoodley (USA) | 0 | 2 | N/A | 0–2 | N/A |
| Total | 24 | 28 | 18-11 | 0–8 | 6–9 |

== Roster ==
U/Tex Wranglers roster
Players
Coaches

| Pos. | No. | Nat. | Name | Ht. | Wt. |
|---|---|---|---|---|---|---|
| G | 4 | (Philippines) | Benjamin Chua | 5 ft 10 in (1.78 m) | | UE |
| F | 5 | (Philippines) | Roy Deles | 6 ft 0 in (1.83 m) | | San Beda |
| G | 6 | (Philippines) | Ricardo Pineda | 5 ft 9 in (1.75 m) | | Letran |
| G | 7 | (Philippines) | Manuel Pineda | 5 ft 8 in (1.73 m) | | Letran |
| F | 8 | (Philippines) | Jaime Noblezada | 6 ft 2 in (1.88 m) | | San Agustin |
| F/C | 9 | (Philippines) | Jaime Taguines | 6 ft 3 in (1.91 m) | | Holy Angel |
| F | 12 | (Philippines) | Reynaldo Pages | 6 ft 1 in (1.85 m) | | De La Salle |
| G/F | 13 | (Philippines) | Oscar Rocha | 6 ft 1 in (1.85 m) | | San Sebastian |
| G | 14 | (Philippines) | Lim Eng Beng | 5 ft 11 in (1.80 m) | | De La Salle |
| F | 15 | (Philippines) | Rodolfo Segura | 6 ft 2 in (1.88 m) | | Adamson |
| F/C | 16 | (Philippines) | Virgilio Cortez | 6 ft 4 in (1.93 m) | | José Rizal |
| F/C | 17 | (Philippines) | David Regullano | 6 ft 4 in (1.93 m) | | Letran |
| F | 20 | (United States) | Glenn McDonald (I) | 6 ft 6 in (1.98 m) | | Long Beach State |
| G | 22 | (Philippines) | Matthew Gaston | 6 ft 1 in (1.85 m) | | Ateneo |
| F/C | 23 | (United States) | Aaron James (I) | 6 ft 8 in (2.03 m) | | Grambling State |
| G/F | 33 | (Philippines) | Bogs Adornado | 6 ft 1 in (1.85 m) | | UST |

Head coach

- (Philippines) Tommy Manotoc

Assistant coach(es)

Legend

- (C) Team captain
- (I) Import
- Injured
