= San Miguel Beermen all-time roster =

Roster of the Philippine basketball team

The following is a list of players, both past and current, who appeared at least in one game for the San Miguel Beermen PBA franchise.

== A ==
Name	Position	School/University	Nickname	Years with SMB		No. of seasons	Ref.
Name	Position	School/University	Nickname	From	To	No. of seasons	Ref.
Mahmoud Abdeen (Asian import)	PG	ASU		2016		1	
Freddie Abuda	PF / C	University of Cebu	The Scavenger	1994	2001	8	
Rommel Adducul	C	San Sebastian College - Recoletos		2006	2008	1	
Eusebio Adolfo				1975		1	
Francis Adriano	SG	Far Eastern University		2004	2005	1	
Keith Agovida	SG / SF	Arellano University		2016	2018	2	
Ato Agustin	PG / SG	Lyceum of the Philippines University	Atom Bomb	1989	1996	8	
Bienvenido Alenton				1975		1	
Alfie Almario	SF / PF	De La Salle University		1986	1990	5	
Gelo Alolino	PG / SG	National U		2020		1	
Paul Alvarez	SF	San Sebastian College	Mr. Excitement	1995	1997	3	
Rabeh Al-Hussaini	C	Ateneo de Manila University		2011	2012	1	
William Antonio	SG	Chaminade University		1998	1999	2	
Ryan Araña	SG	De La Salle University-Manila	The Whirlwind	2015	2016	1	
Paul Artadi	PG	University of the East	The Kid Lightning	2010	2011	1	
Nelson Asaytono	PF	University of Manila	The Bull	1996	1999	4	

== B ==
Name	Position	School/University	Nickname	Years with SMB		No. of seasons	Ref.
Name	Position	School/University	Nickname	From	To	No. of seasons	Ref.
Gido Babilonia	C	University of Santo Tomas		1995	1996	2	
Nonoy Baclao	C / PF	Ateneo de Manila University	Mr. Swat	2011	2012	1	
Maximino Baguio		Cebu Institute of Technology		1975		1	
Froilan Baguion	PG	National University		2008	2009	1	
Renaldo Balkman (Import)	F	South Carolina		2013 2018		2	
Eddie Basden	SG	Charlotte		2012		1	
Nic Belasco	SF / PF	Notre Dame de Namur		1999	2006	6	
Norman Black (Import)	G / F	St. Joseph's University		1982	1985		
Ken Bono	PF / C	Adamson University		2008	2009	1	
Josh Boone	PF / C	UConn		2014		1	
Terick Bridgeman (Import)	G / F	William Peterson		2017		1	
Rodney Brondial	PF / C	Adamson		2021	present	-	
Brandon Brown (Import)	PF / C	Cal State San Bernardino		2021		1	
Ricardo Brown	PG	Pepperdine University	The Quick Brown Fox	1988	1990	3	
Allyn Bulanadi	SG	San Sebastian College-Recoletos		2023	present	-	

== C ==
Name	Position	School/University	Nickname	Years with SMB		No. of seasons	Ref.
Name	Position	School/University	Nickname	From	To	No. of seasons	Ref.
Alex Cabagnot	PG / SG	Hawaii-Hilo	The Crunchman	2010; 2014	2014; 2021	12	
Brandon Cablay	SG	Vanguard University		2006	2007	1	
Allan Caidic	SG	University of the East	The Triggerman	1993	1998	6	
Chris Calaguio	SG / SF	Colegio de San Juan de Letran		2005	2010	4	
Hector Calma	PG	Adamson University	The Director	1986	1994		
Arnold Calo		MLQU					
Michael Cañete	F	Arellano University		2022	present	-	
Frederick Canlas		St. Francis of Assisi					
Santiago Capa				1975		1	
Alvin Castro		De La Salle University					
Justin Chua	C / PF	Ateneo De Manila University	Great Wall of Chua	2014	2015	1	
Cameron Clark	F	Oklahoma		2023		1	
Wendell Comboy	G	Far Eastern		2020	2022	2	
Mike Cortez	PG	De La Salle University	Cool Cat	2008	2011	2	
Jericho Cruz	SG	Adamson University		2022	present	-	
Worley Cuevas				1975		1	
Bonbon Custodio	SG	University of the East	Bonfire	2008	2010	1	

== D ==
Name	Position	School/University	Nickname	Years with SMB		No. of seasons	Ref.
Name	Position	School/University	Nickname	From	To	No. of seasons	Ref.
Gary David	SG	Lyceum of the Philippines University	El Granada	2016		1	
Daniel de Guzman		NEUST		2020	2021	1	
Yancy De Ocampo	C	Saint Francis of Assisi	YDO	2015	2019	4	
Arturo dela Cruz	F						
Ricardo dela Pena				1978		1	
Valerio delos Santos				1978		1	
Jason Deutchman	SF / PF	San Diego State		2013	2014	1	
Yves Dignadice	PF / C	De La Salle University		1986	1998	13	
Ramon Dizon		PSBA		1979			
Axel Doruelo	PG	University of the Philippines		2011 2012	2012 2014	2	
Rob Duat	F	Menlo		1999	2002	3	
Jojo Duncil	SG / PG	University of Santo Tomas		2012; 2013	2013; 2014	2	

== E ==
Name	Position	School/University	Nickname	Years with SMB		No. of seasons	Ref.
Name	Position	School/University	Nickname	From	To	No. of seasons	Ref.
Samigue Eman	C	University of Mindanao		2007	2010	2	
Simon Enciso	PG / SG	Notre Dame de Namur		2021	present	-	
Russel Escoto	C / PF	Far Eastern		2020		1	
Gabby Espinas	PF	Philippine Christian University		2006; 2015	2007; 2018	3	
Ernesto Estrada	SF	University of Visayas		1975	1977	3	

== F ==
Name	Position	School/University	Nickname	Years with SMB		No. of seasons	Ref.
Name	Position	School/University	Nickname	From	To	No. of seasons	Ref.
Marcus Faison (Import)	SG / SF	Siena		2012		1	
June Mar Fajardo	C	University of Cebu	The Kraken	2012	present	-	
Bryan Faundo	C / PF	Colegio de San Juan de Letran		2012	2013	1	
Jeepy Faundo	F / C	University of Santo Tomas		2022	present	-	
Ramon Fernandez	C / PF	University of San Carlos	El Presidente	1972; 1988	1972; 1994	8	
Jeric Fortuna	PG	University of Santo Tomas		2014	2015	1	
Gabe Freeman (Import)	F	Mesa Community College		2009		1	

== G ==
Name	Position	School/University	Nickname	Years with SMB		No. of seasons	Ref.
Name	Position	School/University	Nickname	From	To	No. of seasons	Ref.
Bryan Gahol	PF / C	University of the Philippines		2002	2005		
Bambam Gamalinda	SF	San Beda		2020	present	-	
Arnold Gamboa		University of the East					
Matt Ganuelas-Rosser	SF / SG	Cal Poly Pomona	M.G.R, The Black Panther	2017	2020	3	
RR Garcia	PG / SG	Far Eastern University		2016	2017	1	
Troy Gillenwater (Import)	F	New Mexico State		2018		1	
Alfonzo Gotladera	C / PF	Ateneo		2021		1	
Frank Gugliotta (Import)				1978		1	
Abet Guidaben	C / PF	University of San Jose-Recoletos		1987	1988	2	
Wesley Gonzales	SF	Ateneo de Manila University	Wild Wild Wes	2006	2009	4	
Jeffrey Graves		Angeles University Foundation					
Rey Guevarra	SF / SG	Colegio de San Juan de Letran	Papa Rey	2011	2012	1	

== H ==
Name	Position	School/University	Nickname	Years with SMB		No. of seasons	Ref.
Name	Position	School/University	Nickname	From	To	No. of seasons	Ref.
Robbie Herndon	SF / SG	San Francisco State University		2022	present	-	
Brian Heruela	PG	University of Cebu		2015	2018	3	
John Holland (Import)	SF / SG	Boston University		2019		1	
Michael Holper	PF / C	San Diego State University		2009	2010	1	
Dondon Hontiveros	SG / SF	University of Cebu	The Cebuano Hotshot	2002	2012	10	
Paolo Hubalde	PG / SG	University of the East		2005; 2011; 2012	2006; 2011; 2014	4	

== I ==
Name	Position	School/University	Nickname	Years with SMB		No. of seasons	Ref.
Name	Position	School/University	Nickname	From	To	No. of seasons	Ref.
Danny Ildefonso	C / PF	National University	The Demolition Man	1998	2013	15	
Mark Isip	PF	Far Eastern		2013		1	

== J ==
Name	Position	School/University	Nickname	Years with SMB		No. of seasons	Ref.
Name	Position	School/University	Nickname	From	To	No. of seasons	Ref.
Marlowe Jacutin				1978		1	
Pido Jarencio	PG / SG	University of Santo Tomas	The Fireman	1986	1987	2	
Orlando Johnson	SG / SF	UC Santa Barbara		2022		1	
Kevin Jones (Import)	PF	West Virginia		2014		1	

== K ==
Name	Position	School/University	Nickname	Years with SMB		No. of seasons	Ref.
Name	Position	School/University	Nickname	From	To	No. of seasons	Ref.
Doug Kramer	C / PF	Ateneo de Manila University		2013	2015	3	

== L ==
Name	Position	School/University	Nickname	Years with SMB		No. of seasons	Ref.
Name	Position	School/University	Nickname	From	To	No. of seasons	Ref.
Dwight Lago	F	De La Salle University		1999	2002	4	
Rudy Lalota				1978		1	
Chico Lanete	G	Lyceum	Chico Balboa	2012; 2017	2014; 2019	5	
Marcio Lassiter	SG	Cal State Fullerton	Super Marcio	2012	present	-	
Marlon Legazpi		MLQU					
Frankie Lim	PG	San Beda College		1996		1	
Samboy Lim	SF / SG	Colegio de San Juan de Letran	The Sky Walker	1988	1997	10	
Denver Lopez	PG / SG	Cal State Fullerton		2005	2006	1	
Chris Lutz	SG / SF	Marshall	KidLutz	2011	2017	5	

== M ==
Name	Position	School/University	Nickname	Years with SMB		No. of seasons	Ref.
Name	Position	School/University	Nickname	From	To	No. of seasons	Ref.
Michael Mabulac	PF	Jose Rizal University		2015	2018	3	
Rico Maierhofer	PF	De La Salle University	The Kite, Rico Mambo	2014	2015	1	
Gilbert Malabanan		UPHSD					
Alex Mallari	G / SF	Lewis–Clark		2012	2013	1	
Billy Mamaril	C / PF	Bakersfield	Billy Mama	2017	2020	3	
Vic Manuel	PF	PSBA	The Muscleman	2021	present	-	
Sam Marata	SG	University of the Philippines		2013	2014	1	
Rolando Marcelo				1975			
Rosalio Martires				1975	1982		
Rashawn McCarthy	SG	Old-Westbury		2016	2017	1	
Chris McCullough (Import)	PF	Syracuse		2019		1	
Wendell McKines (Import)	PF	New Mexico State		2017		1	
Sol Mercado	PG / SG	Biola University	Sol Train	2014		2	
Joey Mente	SG	Lyceum of the Philippines University		2001	2005	4	
Alejandrito Miego				1975			
Jesus Migalbin				1978			
Dennis Miranda	PG / SG	Far Eastern University		2009	2013	4	
Elijah Millsap (Import)	SG / SF	University of Alabama at Birmingham		2013; 2016		2	
Billy Moody		Letran College					
Otto Moore (Import)	PF / C	University of Texas		1979		1	
Marcelino Morelos		University of the East					
Terquin Mott (Import)	PF / C	Coppin State		1999		1	
Shabazz Muhammad (Import)	SG / SF	UCLA		2022		1	
Kevin Murphy (Import)	SG	Tennessee Tech		2018		1	
Michael Mustre	F	Letran College					

== N ==
Name	Position	School/University	Nickname	Years with SMB		No. of seasons	Ref.
Name	Position	School/University	Nickname	From	To	No. of seasons	Ref.
Kelly Nabong	PF / C	Santa Rosa JC		2018	2020	2	
Edward Naron		University of Visayas		1997		1	

== O ==
Name	Position	School/University	Nickname	Years with SMB		No. of seasons	Ref.
Name	Position	School/University	Nickname	From	To	No. of seasons	Ref.
Nelbert Omolon	SF	PCU		2014	2016	2	

== P ==
Name	Position	School/University	Nickname	Years with SMB		No. of seasons	Ref.
Name	Position	School/University	Nickname	From	To	No. of seasons	Ref.
Victor Pablo	SF	Far Eastern University		1995		1	
Onie Padilla	C / PF	Cebu College of Commerce		1997	2003	7	
Leonardo Paguntalan		Western Institute of Technology		1978		1	
Manny Paner	PF / C	University of Visayas		1975	1977	3	
Benjie Paras	C	UP Diliman	The Tower of Power	2002	2003	2	
Bobby Parks (Import)	G	Memphis		1987		1	
Ronald Pascual	SF / SG	San Sebastian College-Recoletos		2014	2015	1	
Mick Pennisi	C	Michigan		2008	2011	3	
Dorian Peña	C	Coppin State		2001; 2011	2011; 2012	12	
CJ Perez	SG / SF	Lyceum of the Philippines University	Baby Beast	2021	present	-	
Von Pessumal	SG / SF	Ateneo de Manila University	Vonfire, Tressumal	2017	2022	5	
Mike Phelps (Import)	SG	Alcorn State		1988	1990	3	
Manuel Pineda				1975			
Marc Pingris	PF	Far Eastern University	Pinoy Sakuragi	2008	2009	1	
Larry Pounds (Import)		University of Washington		1979		1	
Franz Pumaren	PG	De La Salle University	The Missile	1986	1997	12	

== R ==
Name	Position	School/University	Nickname	Years with SMB		No. of seasons	Ref.
Name	Position	School/University	Nickname	From	To	No. of seasons	Ref.
Olsen Racela	PG	Ateneo de Manila University	Rah-Rah	1997	2011	14	
Salvador Ramas		Cebu Central College		1980		1	
Biboy Ravanes	SG / SF	University of Cebu		1980; 1992	1985; 1994	9	
Bong Ravena	G	University of the East	The Raven	1992	1994	3	
David Regullano				1975			
Arizona Reid (Import)	SF / PF	High Point		2015	2016	2	
Jay-R Reyes	PF / C	University of the Philippines		2015	2017	3	
Rob Reyes	C / PF	Flagler College		2011	2012	1	
Charles Rhodes (Import)	PF / C	Mississippi State	Colossus	2017	2019	3	
Norberto Rivera				1975		1	
Ronald Roberts (Import)	PF / C	Saint Joseph's		2015		1	
Terrence Romeo	G	Far Eastern	The Bro, Swaggy T	2018	present	-	
Chris Ross	G	Marshall	Man of Steal	2013	present	-	

== S ==
Name	Position	School/University	Nickname	Years with SMB		No. of seasons	Ref.
Name	Position	School/University	Nickname	From	To	No. of seasons	Ref.
Sunday Salvacion	SF / SG	College of Saint Benilde	Sunday Special	2010	2011	1	
Danilo Salvador				1979		1	
Marte Samson				1978		1	
Arwind Santos	SF / PF	Far Eastern University	The Spiderman	2009	2021	12	
Devon Scott	PF / C	Philander Smith		2022		1	
Danny Seigle	PF	Wagner	The Dynamite	1999	2011	10	
David Semerad	PF	San Beda College		2014	2018	4	
James Sena	PF / C	José Rizal		2021	2022	1	
Henry Sims (Import)	C / PF	Georgetown		2013		1	
Mike Singletary (Import)	SF / PF	Texas Tech		2016		1	
Dale Singson	PG / SG	University of Santo Tomas		2004	2005	1	
Magi Sison	C	University of the Philippines		2012	2013	1	
Christian Standhardinger	PF / C	Hawaii	C-Stand, The Bulldozer	2018	2019	2	
Diamond Stone (import)	C	Maryland		2022		1	
Lamont Strothers (Import)	G	Christopher Newport University		1997	2002	6	

== T ==
Name	Position	School/University	Nickname	Years with SMB		No. of seasons	Ref.
Name	Position	School/University	Nickname	From	To	No. of seasons	Ref.
John Taft (Import)	G	Marshall		1991		1	
Yousef Taha	C	Mapúa		2013	2014	1	
Siot Tanquincen	PG	University of Santo Tomas		1997	1998	2	
Moala Tautuaa	C / PF	Chadron State	Big Mo	2019	present	-	
Alvin Teng	PF / C	Arellano University	The Robocop	1986	1994	9	
LA Tenorio	PG	Ateneo de Manila University	Teniente	2006	2008	2	
Antonio Torrente				1978			
Kenny Travis (Import)	G / F	New Mexico		1992	1995	4	
Lordy Tugade	SG / SF	National University	The Alaminos Assassin	2006	2012	6	
Ronald Tubid	SG / SF	University of the East	The Fearless	2013; 2018	2017; 2019	7	

== V ==
Name	Position	School/University	Nickname	Years with SMB		No. of seasons	Ref.
Name	Position	School/University	Nickname	From	To	No. of seasons	Ref.
Evalson Valencia		Western Institute of Technology		1979		1	
Arnold Van Opstal	C	De La Salle University	AVO	2016	2017		
Wilfredo Velasco				1975		1	
Boybits Victoria	G	San Beda College		1998		1	
Louie Vigil	SG / SF	UST		2017	2019	2	
Elpidio Villamin	F / C		The Bicolano Superman	1998		1	
Enrico Villanueva	C	Ateneo de Manila University	The Raging Bull	2007	2008	2	
Jonas Villanueva	PG / SG	Far Eastern University		2007	2010	3	
Anton Viloria		Letran College					

== W ==
Name	Position	School/University	Nickname	Years with SMB		No. of seasons	Ref.
Name	Position	School/University	Nickname	From	To	No. of seasons	Ref.
Jay Washington	F	Eckerd Tritons	J-Wash	2008	2013	5	
Dez Wells (Import)	SG / SF	Maryland	Dez	2019		1	
Terrence Waymond Watson (Import)	SF	Ball State University		2017		1	
Rodney White	SF / PF	Charlotte		2013		1	
Tyler Wilkerson (Import)	PF	Marshall University		2016		1	
Reggie Williams (Import)	SG / SF	VMI		2014		1	
Bubba Wilson (Import)	SG	Western Carolina University		1980		1	
Willy Wilson	F	De La Salle University-Manila		2006	2008	2	

== Y ==
Name	Position	School/University	Nickname	Years with SMB		No. of season	Ref.
Name	Position	School/University	Nickname	From	To	No. of season	Ref.
Joseph Yeo	SG	De La Salle University-Manila	The Ninja	2010	2013	3	

== Z ==
Name	Position	School/University	Nickname	Years with SMB		No. of seasons	Ref.
Name	Position	School/University	Nickname	From	To	No. of seasons	Ref.
Paul Zamar	SG	UE		2019	2022	4	
