= 1981 U-Tex Wranglers season =

1981 U/Tex Wranglers season
- Head coach: Glenn McDonald

Open Conference results
- Record: 19–10 (65.5%)
- Place: 3rd
- Playoff finish: Semifinals

Reinforced Filipino results
- Record: 15–9 (62.5%)
- Place: 2nd
- Playoff finish: Runner-up

U/Tex Wranglers seasons

The 1981 U/Tex Wranglers season was the 7th season of the franchise in the Philippine Basketball Association (PBA).

== Colors ==
Open Conference
(dark)
(light)
Reinforced All-Filipino Conference
(dark)
(light)

== Transactions ==
ADDITIONS
Armando Arce ^{Rookie signed, played for St.George Whisky in the MICAA}
Alberto Ortiz ^{Rookie signed, played for Crispa in the MICAA}
Jesusito Martin ^{Acquired from Gilbey's Gin}
Danilo Pribhdas ^{Acquired from Presto}

== Summary ==
Former Boston Celtic Glenn McDonald, who won two titles with U/Tex as their import, became the new head coach of the Wranglers, replacing his former coach Tommy Manotoc, who transferred to San Miguel Beer.

The Wranglers had a pair of 6-5 Francois Wise and 6-9 Darrell Allums as their imports for the Open Conference. U/Tex finish in a tie with San Miguel Beermen on top of the standings after 18 games in the eliminations. Both teams were left out by traditional powerhouses Toyota and Crispa during the semifinal round. U/Tex placed third by winning their series over the Beermen in five games.

U/Tex lost their first two games in the Reinforced Filipino Conference with John Kazmer as their import, but since the arrival of Leroy Jackson, the Wranglers went on a six-game winning streak and placed third behind Toyota and Crispa at the end of the elimination phase. The Wranglers continued its winning run in the round of six and was the first team to land one of the two finals berth during the semifinal round.

U/Tex and Crispa played in the PBA finals for the third time in the last five years. The Wranglers lost to the Redmanizers in four games in their best-of-five title series.

== Win–loss record vs opponents ==
| Teams | Win | Loss | 1st (Open) | 2nd (RAF) |
| CDCP Road Builders | 3 | 0 | 2-0 | 1–0 |
| Crispa Redmanizers | 7 | 5 | 3-1 | 4-4 |
| Finance Funders | 3 | 0 | 2-0 | 1–0 |
| Gilbey's Gin / St.George | 3 | 0 | 2-0 | 1–0 |
| Presto Fun Drinks | 4 | 2 | 2-0 | 2-2 |
| San Miguel Beermen | 6 | 4 | 5-4 | 1–0 |
| Tefilin Polyesters | 3 | 1 | 1-1 | 2–0 |
| Toyota Super Diesels | 1 | 5 | 0-4 | 1-1 |
| YCO-Tanduay | 4 | 2 | 2-0 | 2-2 |
| Total | 34 | 19 | 19-10 | 15-9 |

== Awards ==
William "Bogs" Adornado received his third MVP plum, becoming the PBA's first three-time Most Valuable Player Awardee. Adornado won his first two during the league's first two seasons in 1975–1976 while playing for Crispa Redmanizers.

== Roster ==
U/Tex Wranglers roster
Players
Coaches

| Pos. | No. | Nat. | Name | Ht. | Wt. |
|---|---|---|---|---|---|---|
| F | 5 | (Philippines) | Roy Deles | 6 ft 0 in (1.83 m) | | San Beda |
| G | 6 | (Philippines) | Ricardo Pineda | 5 ft 9 in (1.75 m) | | Letran |
| G | 7 | (Philippines) | Manuel Pineda | 5 ft 8 in (1.73 m) | | Letran |
| F | 8 | (Philippines) | Jaime Noblezada | 6 ft 2 in (1.88 m) | | San Agustin |
| F/C | 9 | (Philippines) | Jaime Taguines | 6 ft 3 in (1.91 m) | | Holy Angel |
| F/C | 10 | (Philippines) | Jesusito Martin | 6 ft 3 in (1.91 m) | | José Rizal |
| F | 12 | (Philippines) | Reynaldo Pages | 6 ft 1 in (1.85 m) | | De La Salle |
| G/F | 13 | (Philippines) | Danny Pribhdas | 6 ft 1 in (1.85 m) | | PCC |
| G | 14 | (Philippines) | Lim Eng Beng | 5 ft 11 in (1.80 m) | | De La Salle |
| F/C | 17 | (Philippines) | David Regullano | 6 ft 4 in (1.93 m) | | Letran |
| F/C | 18 | (Philippines) | Armando Arce | 6 ft 3 in (1.91 m) |
| G | 21 | (Philippines) | Albert Ortiz | 6 ft 0 in (1.83 m) | | Philippines |
| G | 22 | (Philippines) | Matthew Gaston | 6 ft 1 in (1.85 m) | | Ateneo |
| G/F | 33 | (Philippines) | Bogs Adornado | 6 ft 1 in (1.85 m) | | UST |
| C | 32 | (United States) | Darrell Allums (I) | 6 ft 9 in (2.06 m) | | UCLA |
| F/C | 6 | (United States) | Francois Wise (I) | 6 ft 5 in (1.96 m) | | Long Beach State |
| G/F | 34 | (United States) | John Kazmer (I) | 6 ft 3 in (1.91 m) | | Long Beach State |
| G/F | 4 | (United States) | Leroy Jackson (I) | 6 ft 3 in (1.91 m) | | Cameron |

Head coach

- (United States) Glenn McDonald

Assistant coach(es)

Legend

- (C) Team captain
- (I) Import
- Injured
