= 1978 U-Tex Wranglers season =

- Head coach: Tommy Manotoc

All-Filipino Conference results
- Record: 7–8 (46.7%)
- Place: 5th
- Playoff finish: N/A

Open Conference results
- Record: 18–5 (78.3%)
- Place: 1st
- Playoff finish: Finals

Invitational Conference results
- Record: 2–5 (28.6%)
- Place: 4th
- Playoff finish: N/A

U-Tex Wranglers seasons

The 1978 U-Tex Wranglers season was the 4th season of the franchise in the Philippine Basketball Association (PBA).

== Off-season transactions ==
Signed Renato Lobo and Anthony Dasalla, formerly of Solidenims in the MICAA.

== Championship ==
The second conference of the season had U-Tex being given the option to use two imports simultaneously, the Wranglers were reinforced by the returning Byron "Snake" Jones playing at center and Henry Williams to quarterback and shoot. After four games, coach Tommy Manotoc decided to replace Williams in favor of Glenn McDonald, a member of the 1976 NBA champion Boston Celtics. The formidable combination of Jones, McDonald and Lim Eng Beng led the Wranglers to a 10-4 won-loss slate in the eliminations and breezed into the finals with a 5–1 record in the semifinal round and will play defending champion Crispa 400s in a rematch of last year's Open championship.

The U-Tex Wranglers won the Open Conference title and made history by surprisingly scoring a clean 3–0 sweep over Crispa 400s. After winning the series opener by a point in overtime, 95–94, U-Tex won games two and three, 100-93 and 104–96, to finally break the stranglehold of Crispa and Toyota for winning titles and becoming the first team outside of the two ballclubs to win a PBA crown.

== Roster ==
U/Tex Wranglers roster
Players
Coaches

| Pos. | No. | Nat. | Name | Ht. | Wt. |
|---|---|---|---|---|---|---|
| G | 5 | (Philippines) | Roy Deles | 6 ft 0 in (1.83 m) | | San Beda |
| G | 6 | (Philippines) | Ricardo Pineda | 5 ft 9 in (1.75 m) | | Letran |
| F | 7 | (Philippines) | Renato Lobo | 6 ft 2 in (1.88 m) | | Far Eastern |
| F | 8 | (Philippines) | Jaime Noblezada | 6 ft 2 in (1.88 m) | | San Agustin |
| F/C | 9 | (Philippines) | Anthony Dasalla | 6 ft 3 in (1.91 m) | | Far Eastern |
| G | 11 | (Philippines) | Rudolf Hines | 5 ft 9 in (1.75 m) | | Letran |
| F/C | 12 | (Philippines) | Romualdo Cabading | 6 ft 2 in (1.88 m) | | Baguio |
| F/C | 13 | (Philippines) | Rudolf Kutch | 6 ft 2 in (1.88 m) | | UE |
| G | 14 | (Philippines) | Lim Eng Beng | 5 ft 11 in (1.80 m) | | De La Salle |
| F/C | 25−15 | (Philippines) | Romeo Frank | 6 ft 2 in (1.88 m) |
| C | 15 | (Philippines) | Edward Camus | 6 ft 3 in (1.91 m) |
| F | 16 | (Philippines) | Alfonso Mora | 6 ft 0 in (1.83 m) | | San Sebastian |
| F | 3 | (United States) | Hank Williams (I) | 6 ft 6 in (1.98 m) | | Jacksonville |
| F | 20 | (United States) | Glenn McDonald (I) | 6 ft 6 in (1.98 m) | | Long Beach State |
| F/C | 33 | (United States) | Byron Jones (I) | 6 ft 8 in (2.03 m) | | San Francisco |

Head coach

- (Philippines) Tommy Manotoc

Assistant coach(es)

- (Philippines) Nap Flores

Legend

- (C) Team captain
- (I) Import
- Injured
