= List of San Miguel Beermen seasons =

The San Miguel Beermen, owned by San Miguel Brewery, joined the Philippine Basketball Association (PBA) in 1975, making them the only surviving original team to date. The team began play as the Royal Tru Orange in the 1975 PBA season.

== Records per conference ==
Grand Slam champion	Conference champions	Conference runners-up	Conference third-place/semifinalists

=== Three-conference era (1975–2003) ===
Season	Conference	Team name	Overall record			Finals
Season	Conference	Team name	W	L	%	Finals
1975	First Conference	Royal Tru-Orange	25	31	.446	
1975	Second Conference	Royal Tru-Orange	25	31	.446	
1975	All-Philippine	Royal Tru-Orange	25	31	.446	
1976	First Conference	Royal Tru-Orange	22	24	.408	
1976	Second Conference	Royal Tru-Orange	22	24	.408	
1976	All-Philippine	Royal Tru-Orange	22	24	.408	
1977	All-Filipino Conference	Royal Tru-Orange	5	23	.179	
1977	Open Conference	Royal Tru-Orange	5	23	.179	
1977	Invitational Conference	Royal Tru-Orange	5	23	.179	
1978	All-Filipino Conference	Royal Tru-Orange	12	16	.429	
1978	Open Conference	Royal Tru-Orange	12	16	.429	
1978	Invitational Conference	Royal Tru-Orange	12	16	.429	
1979	All-Filipino Conference	Royal Tru-Orange	28	19	.596	
1979	Open Conference	Royal Tru-Orange	28	19	.596	Royal 3, Toyota 1
1979	Invitational Conference	Royal Tru-Orange	28	19	.596	
1980	Open Conference	Royal Tru-Orange	9	23	.281	
1980	Invitational Conference	San Miguel Beermen	9	23	.281	
1980	All-Filipino Conference	San Miguel Beermen	9	23	.281	
1981	Open Conference	San Miguel Beermen	22	19	.537	
1981	Reinforced Filipino Conference	San Miguel Beermen	22	19	.537	
1982	Reinforced Filipino Conference	San Miguel Beermen	40	26	.606	Toyota 4, San Miguel 3
1982	Invitational Conference	San Miguel Beermen	40	26	.606	San Miguel 2, Crispa 1
1982	Open Conference	San Miguel Beermen	40	26	.606	
1983	All-Filipino Conference	San Miguel Beermen	26	27	.491	
1983	Reinforced Filipino Conference	San Miguel Beermen	26	27	.491	
1983	Open Conference	San Miguel Beermen	26	27	.491	
1984	First All-Filipino Conference	Gold Eagle Beermen	11	27	.289	
1984	Second All-Filipino Conference	Gold Eagle Beermen	11	27	.289	
1984	Invitational Conference	Gold Eagle Beermen	11	27	.289	
1985	Open Conference	Magnolia Ice Cream Makers	26	28	.481	Great Taste 4, Magnolia 2
1985	All-Filipino Conference	Magnolia Ice Cream Makers	26	28	.481	
1985	Reinforced Conference	Magnolia Quench Plus	26	28	.481	
1986	Reinforced Conference	San Miguel franchise took a leave of absence.				
1986	All-Filipino Conference	San Miguel franchise took a leave of absence.				
1986	Open Conference	Magnolia Cheese Makers	2	10	.167	
1987	Open Conference	Magnolia Ice Cream Makers	43	23	.652	
1987	All-Filipino Conference	Magnolia Ice Cream Makers	43	23	.652	
1987	Reinforced Conference	San Miguel Beermen	43	23	.652	San Miguel 4, Hills Bros. 1
1988	Open Conference	San Miguel Beermen	46	26	.639	San Miguel 4, Purefoods 3
1988	All-Filipino Conference	San Miguel Beermen	46	26	.639	
1988	Reinforced Conference	San Miguel Beermen	46	26	.639	San Miguel 4, Shell 1
1989	Open Conference	San Miguel Beermen	50	21	.704	San Miguel 4, Shell 1
1989	All-Filipino Conference	San Miguel Beermen	50	21	.704	San Miguel 4, Purefoods 2
1989	Reinforced Conference	San Miguel Beermen	50	21	.704	San Miguel 4, Añejo 1
1990	First Conference	San Miguel Beermen	29	27	.518	
1990	All-Filipino Conference	San Miguel Beermen	29	27	.518	
1990	Third Conference	San Miguel Beermen	29	27	.518	
1991	First Conference	San Miguel Beermen	33	27	.550	
1991	All-Filipino Conference	San Miguel Beermen	33	27	.550	
1991	Third Conference	San Miguel Beermen	33	27	.550	
1992	First Conference	San Miguel Beermen	43	31	.581	Shell 4, San Miguel 1
1992	All-Filipino Conference	San Miguel Beermen	43	31	.581	San Miguel 4, Purefoods 3
1992	Third Conference	San Miguel Beermen	43	31	.581	
1993	All-Filipino Cup	San Miguel Beermen	46	25	.648	Coney Island 4, San Miguel 2
1993	Commissioner's Cup	San Miguel Beermen	46	25	.648	
1993	Governors Cup	San Miguel Beermen	46	25	.648	San Miguel 4, Swift 1
1994	All-Filipino Cup	San Miguel Beermen	31	26	.544	San Miguel 4, Coney Island 2
1994	Commissioner's Cup	San Miguel Beermen	31	26	.544	
1994	Governors Cup	San Miguel Beermen	31	26	.544	
1995	All-Filipino Cup	San Miguel Beermen	27	23	.540	
1995	Commissioner's Cup	San Miguel Beermen	27	23	.540	
1995	Governors Cup	San Miguel Beermen	27	23	.540	Alaska 4, San Miguel 3
1996	All-Filipino Cup	San Miguel Beermen	25	26	.490	
1996	Commissioner's Cup	San Miguel Beermen	25	26	.490	
1996	Governors Cup	San Miguel Beermen	25	26	.490	
1997	All-Filipino Cup	San Miguel Beermen	35	28	.556	
1997	Commissioner's Cup	San Miguel Beermen	35	28	.556	
1997	Governors Cup	San Miguel Beermen	35	28	.556	
1998	All-Filipino Cup	San Miguel Beermen	43	31	.581	Alaska 4, San Miguel 3
1998	Commissioner's Cup	San Miguel Beermen	43	31	.581	Alaska 4, San Miguel 2
1998	Centennial Cup	San Miguel Beermen	43	31	.581	
1998	Governors Cup	San Miguel Beermen	43	31	.581	
1999	All-Filipino Cup	San Miguel Beermen	35	20	.636	
1999	Commissioner's Cup	San Miguel Beermen	35	20	.636	San Miguel 4, Shell 2
1999	Governors Cup	San Miguel Beermen	35	20	.636	San Miguel 4, Alaska 2
2000	All-Filipino Cup	San Miguel Beermen	12	8	.600	
2000	Commissioner's Cup	San Miguel Beermen	15	3	.833	San Miguel 4, Sta. Lucia 1
2000	Governors Cup	San Miguel Beermen	13	7	.650	San Miguel 4, Purefoods 1
2001	All-Filipino Cup	San Miguel Beermen	17	9	.654	San Miguel 4, Barangay Ginebra 2
2001	Commissioner's Cup	San Miguel Beermen	13	8	.619	Red Bull 4, San Miguel 2
2001	Governors Cup	San Miguel Beermen	13	10	.565	Sta. Lucia 4, San Miguel 2
2002	Governors Cup	San Miguel Beermen	9	10	.474	
2002	Commissioner's Cup	San Miguel Beermen	9	8	.529	
2002	All-Filipino Cup	San Miguel Beermen	8	5	.615	
2003	All-Filipino Cup	San Miguel Beermen	13	8	.619	
2003	Invitational Conference	San Miguel Beermen	2	2	.500	
2003	Reinforced Conference	San Miguel Beermen	13	12	.520	Coca-Cola 4, San Miguel 3
Overall record			851	697	.550	16 championships

=== Two-conference era (2004–2010) ===
Season	Conference	Team name	Elimination/classification round						Playoffs	
Season	Conference	Team name	Finish	GP	W	L	PCT	GB	Stage	Results
(2004)	Fiesta Conference	San Miguel Beermen	1st/10	18	16	2	.889	--	Quarterfinals	3rd in Group A (1–2)
2004–05	Philippine Cup	San Miguel Beermen	5th/10	18	9	9	.500	4	Semifinals; 3rd-place playoff	4th overall (11-12) 2-3 in Semifinals; San Miguel 105, Shell 100*
2004–05	Fiesta Conference	San Miguel Beermen	2nd/10	18	11	7	.611	1	2nd seed playoff Semifinals; Finals	San Miguel 73, Alaska 71*; San Miguel 3, Red Bull 1 San Miguel 4, Talk 'N Text 1
2005–06	Fiesta Conference	San Miguel Beermen	8th/9	16	6	10	.375	4	Survivor playoffs Wildcard phase	San Miguel** def. Coca-Cola 82–85 (OT), 69–67; Air21 2, San Miguel 1
2005–06	Philippine Cup	San Miguel Beermen	2nd/9	16	11	5	.689	1	Semifinals; 3rd-place playoff	Red Bull 4, San Miguel 3 Alaska 102, San Miguel 95*
2006–07	Philippine Cup	San Miguel Beermen	2nd/10	18	13	5	.722	--	Semifinals; Finals	San Miguel 4, Red Bull 3 Barangay Ginebra 4, San Miguel 2
2006–07	Fiesta Conference	San Miguel Beermen	6th/10	18	10	8	.556	3	5th-seed playoff 1st wildcard round 2nd wildcard round Quarterfinals; Semifinals; 3rd-place playoff	Air21 103, San Miguel 99*; San Miguel 102, Sta. Lucia 85*; San Miguel 102, Coca-Cola 101*; San Miguel 2, Barangay Ginebra 1 Alaska 4, San Miguel 2 Red Bull 103, San Miguel 96*
2007–08	Philippine Cup	Magnolia Beverage Masters	5th/10	18	10	8	.556	2	Quarterfinals	Red Bull 2, Magnolia 0
2007–08	Fiesta Conference	Magnolia Beverage Masters	5th/10	18	10	8	.556	2	Quarterfinals; Semifinals; 3rd-place playoff	Magnolia 2, Coca-Cola 1 Air21 4, Magnolia 2 Red Bull 102, Magnolia 90*
2008–09	Philippine Cup	San Miguel Beermen	6th/10	18	9	9	.500	3	1st wildcard round 2nd wildcard round Quarterfinals; Semifinals; 3rd-place playoff	San Miguel 99, Coca-Cola 89*; San Miguel 105, Air21 86*; San Miguel 2, Barangay Ginebra 1 Talk 'N Text 4, San Miguel 2 Sta. Lucia 99, San Miguel 97 (OT)*
2008–09	Fiesta Conference	San Miguel Beermen	1st/10	14	11	3	.786	--	Semifinals; Finals	San Miguel 4, Burger King 2 San Miguel 4, Barangay Ginebra 3
2009–10	Philippine Cup	San Miguel Beermen	2nd/10	18	13	5	.722	--	Semifinals; 3rd-place playoff	Purefoods 4, San Miguel 2 San Miguel 95 Barangay Ginebra 88*
2009–10	Fiesta Conference	San Miguel Beermen	2nd/10	18	13	5	.722	2	2nd-seed playoff Semifinals; Finals	San Miguel 88, B-Meg Derby Ace 83*; San Miguel 4, B-Meg Derby Ace 2 Alaska 4, San Miguel 2
Elimination/classification round				226	142	84	.628	—	12 post-wildcard appearances	
Playoffs				117	59	59	.500	—	4 Finals appearances	
Cumulative totals				344	201	143	.584	—	2 championships	

- one-game playoffs
  **team had twice-to-beat advantage

=== Three-conference era (2010–present) ===
Season	Conference	Team name	Elimination round						Playoffs	
Season	Conference	Team name	Finish	GP	W	L	PCT	GB	Stage	Results
2010–11	Philippine	San Miguel Beermen	2nd/10	14	11	3	.786	—	Quarterfinals; Semifinals; Finals	San Miguel** 95, Air21 75; San Miguel 4, Barangay Ginebra 2 Talk 'N Text 4, San Miguel 2
2010–11	Commissioner's	San Miguel Beermen	10th/10	9	2	7	.286	6	Did not qualify	
2010–11	Governors'	Petron Blaze Boosters	2nd/9	8	5	3	.625	1	Semifinals; Finals	2nd overall (8–5), 3–2 in semifinals Petron 4, Talk 'N Text 3
2011–12	Philippine	Petron Blaze Boosters	3rd/10	14	9	5	.643	1	Quarterfinals; Semifinals	Petron 2, Meralco 0 Talk 'N Text 4, Petron 3
2011–12	Commissioner's	Petron Blaze Boosters	9th/10	9	3	6	.333	4	Did not qualify	
2011–12	Governors'	Petron Blaze Boosters	5th/10	9	5	4	.555	3	Semifinals	5th overall (6–8), 1–4 in semifinals
2012–13	Philippine	Petron Blaze Boosters	7th/10	14	6	8	.357	7	Quarterfinals	San Mig Coffee** 92, Petron 87
2012–13	Commissioner's	Petron Blaze Boosters	3rd/10	14	8	6	.571	3	Quarterfinals	Talk 'N Text 2, Petron 0
2012–13	Governors'	Petron Blaze Boosters	1st/10	9	8	1	.889	—	Quarterfinals; Semifinals; Finals	Petron** 101, Barangay Ginebra 94; Petron 3, Rain or Shine 1 San Mig Coffee 4, Petron 3
2013–14	Philippine	Petron Blaze Boosters	3rd/10	14	10	4	.714	1	Quarterfinals; Semifinals	Petron 2, Barako Bull 0 Rain or Shine 4, Petron 1
2013–14	Commissioner's	San Miguel Beermen	2nd/10	9	7	2	.778	2	Quarterfinals	Air21 def. San Miguel** in 2 games
2013–14	Governors'	San Miguel Beermen	5th/10	9	5	4	.554	—	Quarterfinals	San Mig Super Coffee** 97, San Miguel 90
2014–15	Philippine	San Miguel Beermen	1st/12	11	9	2	.818	—	Semifinals; Finals	San Miguel 4, Talk N' Text 0 San Miguel 4, Alaska 3
2014–15	Commissioner's	San Miguel Beermen	9th/12	11	4	7	.364	4	Did not qualify	
2014–15	Governors'	San Miguel Beermen	2nd/12	11	8	3	.727	—	Quarterfinals; Semifinals; Finals	San Miguel** def. Meralco in 2 games San Miguel 3, Rain or Shine 1 San Miguel 4, Alaska 0
2015–16	Philippine	San Miguel Beermen	2nd/12	11	9	2	.818	—	Semifinals; Finals	San Miguel 4, Rain or Shine 2 San Miguel 4, Alaska 3
2015–16	Commissioner's	San Miguel Beermen	1st/12	11	8	3	.727	—	Quarterfinals; Semifinals	San Miguel** def. Star in 3 games Rain or Shine 3, San Miguel 1
2015–16	Governors'	San Miguel Beermen	2nd/12	11	8	3	.727	2	Quarterfinals; Semifinals	San Miguel** 114, NLEX 110; Barangay Ginebra 3, San Miguel 2
2016–17	Philippine	San Miguel Beermen	1st/12	11	10	1	.909	—	Quarterfinals; Semifinals; Finals	San Miguel** 98, Rain or Shine 91; San Miguel 4, TNT 3 San Miguel 4, Barangay Ginebra 1
2016–17	Commissioner's	San Miguel Beermen	2nd/12	11	9	2	.818	—	Quarterfinals; Semifinals; Finals	San Miguel** 115, Phoenix 96; San Miguel 3, Star 1 San Miguel 4, TNT 2
2016–17	Governors'	San Miguel Beermen	6th/12	11	7	4	.636	2	Quarterfinals	Barangay Ginebra** 104, San Miguel 84
2017–18	Philippine	San Miguel Beermen	1st/12	11	8	3	.727	—	Quarterfinals; Semifinals; Finals	San Miguel** 106, TNT 93; San Miguel 4, Barangay Ginebra 1 San Miguel 4, Magnolia 1
2017–18	Commissioner's	San Miguel Beermen	6th/12	11	6	5	.545	3	Quarterfinals; Semifinals; Finals	San Miguel 2, TNT 0 San Miguel 3, Alaska 1 Barangay Ginebra 4, San Miguel 2
2017–18	Governors'	San Miguel Beermen	6th/12	11	6	5	.545	3	Quarterfinals	Alaska** 96, San Miguel 85
2019	Philippine	San Miguel Beermen	5th/12	11	7	4	.636	2	Quarterfinals; Semifinals; Finals	San Miguel 2, TNT 1 San Miguel 4, Phoenix Pulse 1 San Miguel 4, Magnolia 3
2019	Commissioner's	San Miguel Beermen	7th/12	11	5	6	.455	5	Quarterfinals; Semifinals; Finals	San Miguel def. NorthPort** in 2 games San Miguel 3, Rain or Shine 1 San Miguel 4, TNT 2
2019	Governors'	San Miguel Beermen	5th/12	11	6	5	.545	2	Quarterfinals	Barangay Ginebra** 100, San Miguel 97
2020	Philippine	San Miguel Beermen	4th/12	11	7	4	.636	1	Quarterfinals	Meralco def. San Miguel** in 2 games
2021	Philippine	San Miguel Beermen	4th/12	11	7	4	.636	3	Quarterfinals; Semifinals	San Miguel 2, NorthPort 0 TNT 4, San Miguel 3
2021	Governors'	San Miguel Beermen	5th/12	11	7	4	.636	2	Quarterfinals	Meralco** 100, San Miguel 85
2022–23	Philippine	San Miguel Beermen	1st/12	11	9	2	.818	—	Quarterfinals; Semifinals; Finals	San Miguel** 123, Blackwater 93; San Miguel 4, Meralco 3 San Miguel 4, TNT 3
2022–23	Commissioner's	San Miguel Beermen	5th/13	12	7	5	.583	3	Quarterfinals; Semifinals	San Miguel 2, Converge 0 Bay Area 3, San Miguel 1
2022–23	Governors'	San Miguel Beermen	2nd/12	11	9	2	.818	1	Quarterfinals; Semifinals	San Miguel** 121, Converge 105; Barangay Ginebra 3, San Miguel 0
2023–24	Commissioner's	San Miguel Beermen	2nd/12	11	8	3	.727	1	Quarterfinals; Semifinals; Finals	San Miguel** 127, Rain or Shine 122; San Miguel 3, Barangay Ginebra 0 San Miguel 4, Magnolia 2
2023–24	Philippine	San Miguel Beermen	1st/12	11	10	1	.909	—	Quarterfinals; Semifinals; Finals	San Miguel** def. Terrafirma in 2 games San Miguel 4, Rain or Shine 0 Meralco 4, San Miguel 2
2024–25	Governors'	San Miguel Beermen	2nd in Group B	10	6	4	.600	1	Quarterfinals; Semifinals	San Miguel 3, Converge 2 Barangay Ginebra 4, San Miguel 2
2024–25	Commissioner's	San Miguel Beermen	10th/13	12	5	7	.417	4	Did not qualify	
2024–25	Philippine	San Miguel Beermen	1st/12	11	8	3	.727	—	Quarterfinals; Semifinals	San Miguel** 108, Meralco 97; San Miguel 4, Barangay Ginebra 3 San Miguel 4, TNT 2
Elimination round				419	272	147	.649	—	34 Playoff appearances	
Playoffs				271	158	113	.583	—	25 Semifinals appearances 16 Finals appearances	
Cumulative records				690	430	260	.623	—	12 Championships	

*one-game playoffs
**team had the twice-to-beat advantage

== Cumulative records ==
Era	GP	W	L	PCT
Three-conference era (1975–2003)	1,548	851	697	.550
Two-conference era (2004–2010)	344	201	143	.584
Three-conference era (2010–present)	690	430	260	.623
Total	2,582	1,482	1,100	.574
