= 1975 Royal Tru-Orange season =

- Head coach: Ignacio Ramos
- Owner(s): San Miguel Corporation

First Conference results
- Record: 11–15 (42.3%)
- Place: 4th
- Playoff finish: Semis

Second Conference results
- Record: 11–11 (50%)
- Place: 4th
- Playoff finish: Semis

All-Philippine Championship results
- Record: 3–5 (37.5%)
- Place: 4th
- Playoff finish: N/A

Royal Tru-Orange seasons

The 1975 Royal Tru-Orange season was the 1st season of the franchise in the Philippine Basketball Association (PBA).

== First Conference standings ==
#	Teams	W	L	PCT	GB
1	Toyota Tamaraws	13	3	.812	–-
2	Crispa Redmanizers	12	4	.750	1
3	U-Tex Weavers	10	6	.625	3
4	Royal Tru-Orange	10	6	.625	3
5	Mariwasa-Noritake	8	8	.500	5
6	Concepcion Carrier	7	9	.438	6
7	Tanduay Distillery	5	11	.312	8
8	CFC-Presto	5	11	.312	8
9	Seven-Up	2	14	.125	11

== Summary ==
The Royal Tru-Orangemen were among the top four teams which made it to semifinal round in the PBA's very first conference. They lost all their six games in the two-round semifinals and placed fourth behind champion Toyota, runner-up Crispa, and third place U-Tex. In the second conference, Royal had a pair of Harry Brown and Steve Smith as their imports. The Orangemen were in their second semifinal stint and this time, they won two out of their six assignments, not enough to make it even in a playoff berth. Royal played Noritake in the best-of-five series for third place and after winning Game One, 125-122, the Orangemen lost the next two games and with Crispa forfeiting Game four of the finals against Toyota, the Orangemen ended up fourth place again. They completed a fourth place finish in all three conferences of the season as the Orangemen, despite beating U-Tex in the round-robin All-Philippine championship, they lost to U-Tex in five games in their series for third place.

== Roster ==
Roster	#	Position	Height
Bienvenido Alenton	4	Center-Forward	6 ft 1 in (1.85 m)
Maximino Baguio	2	Guard	6 ft 0 in (1.83 m)
Santiago Capa	9	Center	6 ft 2 in (1.88 m)
Worley Cuevas	11	Forward	6 ft 0 in (1.83 m)
Ernesto Estrada	5	Forward	5 ft 11 in (1.80 m)
Rolando Marcelo	6	Guard-Forward	5 ft 10 in (1.78 m)
Rosalio Martirez	14	Guard	5 ft 8 in (1.73 m)
Alejandrito Miego	1	Guard	5 ft 6 in (1.68 m)
Manny Paner	13	Forward-Center	6 ft 2 in (1.88 m)
Manuel Pineda	8	Guard	5 ft 8 in (1.73 m)
David Regullano	15	Center-Forward	6 ft 4 in (1.93 m)
Norberto Rivera	3	Forward	5 ft 11 in (1.80 m)
Wilfredo Velasco	7	Forward	6 ft 0 in (1.83 m)
Stephen Smith ^{Import}	10	Forward	6 ft 8 in (2.03 m)
Harry Brown ^{Import}	12	Guard-Forward	6 ft 6 in (1.98 m)
