= 1981 PBA Reinforced Filipino Conference finals =

Team	Coach	Wins
Crispa Redmanizers	Baby Dalupan	3
U-Tex Wranglers	Glenn McDonald	1
- Dates: November 19–28, 1981
- Television: MBS
- Radio network: DWXL

PBA Reinforced Filipino Conference finals chronology
- 1982 >

The 1981 PBA Reinforced Filipino Conference finals was the best-of-5 basketball championship series of the 1981 PBA Reinforced Filipino Conference, and the conclusion of the conference's playoffs.

The Crispa Redmanizers captured their 9th PBA title with a 3–1 series win against the U/Tex Wranglers.

== Qualification ==
U-Tex Wranglers		Crispa Redmanizers
Finished 6–3 (.667)	Eliminations	Finished 7–2 (.778)
Finished 4–1 (.800)	Quarterfinals	Finished 3–2 (.600)
Finished 4–2 (.667), 1st	Semifinals	Finished 3–3 (.500), tied for 2nd
Finished 4–2 (.667), 1st	Tiebreaker	Won against Presto Fun Drinks, 119–114

== Games summary ==
=== Game 1 ===
MBS

November 19

Crispa Redmanizers 113, U-Tex Wranglers 108
Crispa leads series, 1–0

Araneta Coliseum, Quezon City

The Redmanizers outscored the Wranglers, 33–18 in the second quarter to take a 62–45 lead at halftime. Crispa kept U/Tex at a 15-point distance in the first seven minutes of play in the third period before Bogs Adornado and Lim Eng Beng scored successively from the field to get the Wranglers to within seven points, 73–80. The Wranglers threaten once more in the final quarter with Leroy Jackson, Adornado and Lim combined for 26 points but Abet Guidaben scored twice to stop their rally as Crispa leads, 110–99. U/Tex kept on fighting back with a 9–2 run, Al Green's basket was countered by a three-point goal from Ricky Pineda to trim the lead further at 108–112, luckily for the Redmanizers, time has run out on U/Tex, Green made a charity from Jackson's backcourt foul for the final count.

=== Game 2 ===
MBS

November 21

Crispa Redmanizers 91, U-Tex Wranglers 95
Series tied, 1–1

Araneta Coliseum, Quezon City

The Wranglers trailed for most part of the first half, reversed the trend in the second half and even led by eight points, 89–81, Freddie Hubalde spark a rally for Crispa that tied the count for the last time at 91–all, Wranglers' import Leroy Jackson came up with the key points in the last two minutes of play, after he put U/Tex back on top, Hubalde missed tying the game when he muffed an easy layup, Jackson scored on a fastbreak hit that iced the game for U/Tex with 10 seconds left.

=== Game 3 ===
MBS

November 26

Crispa Redmanizers 116, U-Tex Wranglers 112
Crispa leads series, 2–1

Araneta Coliseum, Quezon City

Al Green, coming out of the bench in the last four minutes, tallied two three-point plays against Leroy Jackson to give Crispa a 114–108 margin, the Wranglers fell behind by 14 points in the first half and 13 in the final period. Bogs Adornado shot the last six of his 34 points in a U/Tex rally that cut down Crispa's lead to two, 101–103. It was then when Green made the first of his three-point plays.

=== Game 4 ===
MBS

November 28

recap

Crispa Redmanizers 124, U-Tex Wranglers 119
Crispa wins series, 3–1

Araneta Coliseum, Quezon City

A 23–10 run by Crispa in the second quarter with Atoy Co catching fire, gave them leads by 15 points, 52–37, the Wranglers fought back to within eight points at halftime, 55–63. The Redmanizers had entered penalty situation midway in the third quarter, Leroy Jackson got away with 16 points, 10 of which came from the foul line, coach Baby Dalupan was so mad at the way officiating was going that he yelled at the referees during a U/Tex timeout. Crispa led by only one, 91–90, at the end of the first 36 minutes of play. In the final quarter, the Wranglers, starring Jackson and Jimmy Noblezada, grabbed the lead and held it several times, the last at 105–103, gutsy plays gave the Redmanizers a 109–106 lead before Philip Cezar made a clever move that caused Adornado to charge into him for an offensive foul and Adornado's sixth foul to bowed out in the ballgame, a 7–4 burst gave Crispa a comfortable 119–114 edge with less than two minutes remaining.

1981 PBA Reinforced Filipino Conference Champions

Crispa Redmanizers
Ninth title

== Rosters ==
Crispa Redmanizers roster
Players
Coaches

Pos.	No.	Nat.	Name	Ht.	Wt.
C	5	(Philippines)	Abet Guidaben	6 ft 5 in (1.96 m)		USJ–R
G	6	(Philippines)	Fortunato Co, Jr	6 ft 1 in (1.85 m)		Mapúa
G	7	(Philippines)	Arturo Cristobal	6 ft 1 in (1.85 m)		Far Eastern
F	9	(Philippines)	Padim Israel	6 ft 2 in (1.88 m)		Ateneo
G/F	10	(Philippines)	Freddie Hubalde	6 ft 1 in (1.85 m)		Mapúa
G/F	11	(United States)	Al Green (I)	6 ft 1 in (1.85 m)		LSU
F	13	(Philippines)	Elpidio Villamin	6 ft 2 in (1.88 m)
G	14	(Philippines)	Ramon Cruz	5 ft 11 in (1.80 m)		UE
G	15	(Philippines)	Bernie Fabiosa	5 ft 9 in (1.75 m)		UE
C	17	(Philippines)	Romulo Mamaril	6 ft 6 in (1.98 m)		Mapúa
F	18	(Philippines)	Philip Cezar	6 ft 3 in (1.91 m)		José Rizal
G	19	(Philippines)	Rudy Distrito	5 ft 11 in (1.80 m)		UE
F	23	(Philippines)	Bernardo Carpio	6 ft 3 in (1.91 m)		Ateneo

Head coach

- (Philippines) Baby Dalupan

Assistant coach(es)

Legend

- (C) Team captain
- (I) Import
- Injured

U/Tex Wranglers roster
Players
Coaches

Pos.	No.	Nat.	Name	Ht.	Wt.
G/F	4	(United States)	Leroy Jackson (I)	6 ft 3 in (1.91 m)		Cameron
F	5	(Philippines)	Roy Deles	6 ft 0 in (1.83 m)		San Beda
G	6	(Philippines)	Ricardo Pineda	5 ft 9 in (1.75 m)		Letran
G	7	(Philippines)	Manuel Pineda	5 ft 8 in (1.73 m)		Letran
F	8	(Philippines)	Jaime Noblezada	6 ft 2 in (1.88 m)		San Agustin
F/C	9	(Philippines)	Jaime Taguines	6 ft 3 in (1.91 m)		Holy Angel
F/C	10	(Philippines)	Jesusito Martin	6 ft 3 in (1.91 m)		José Rizal
F	12	(Philippines)	Reynaldo Pages	6 ft 1 in (1.85 m)		De La Salle
G/F	13	(Philippines)	Danny Pribhdas	6 ft 1 in (1.85 m)		PCC
G	14	(Philippines)	Lim Eng Beng	5 ft 11 in (1.80 m)		De La Salle
F/C	18	(Philippines)	Armando Arce	6 ft 3 in (1.91 m)
G	21	(Philippines)	Albert Ortiz	6 ft 0 in (1.83 m)		Philippines
G	22	(Philippines)	Matthew Gaston	6 ft 1 in (1.85 m)		Ateneo
G/F	33	(Philippines)	Bogs Adornado	6 ft 1 in (1.85 m)		UST

Head coach

- (United States) Glenn McDonald

Assistant coach(es)

Legend

- (C) Team captain
- (I) Import
- Injured

== Broadcast notes ==
Game	Play-by-play	Analyst
Game 1		
Game 2		
Game 3		
Game 4		
