= 1980 Crispa Redmanizers season =

- Head coach: Baby Dalupan
- Owner(s): P. Floro and Sons, inc

Open Conference results
- Record: 19–9 (67.9%)
- Place: 3rd
- Playoff finish: Semifinals

Invitational Conference results
- Record: 5–5 (50%)
- Place: 4th
- Playoff finish: N/A

All-Filipino Conference results
- Record: 20–1 (95.2%)
- Place: 1st
- Playoff finish: Champion

Crispa Redmanizers seasons

The 1980 Crispa Redmanizers season was the 6th season of the franchise in the Philippine Basketball Association (PBA). The team was known as Walk Tall Jeans in the first two conferences.

== Colors ==
Walk Tall Jeans (Open Conference)
(dark)
(light)
Walk Tall Jeans (Open and Invitational Conferences)

Crispa Redmanizers (All-Filipino Conference)
(dark)
(light)

== Summary ==
Crispa Walk Tall Jeans had the pair of Glenn Mosley and Sylvester Cuyler as their imports for the Open Conference. After five games, Mosley was replaced by Larry Boston. Two-time PBA Most Valuable Player William "Bogs" Adornado was released by Crispa to U/tex Wranglers after playing only seven games for the Jeans Makers. The team finish third behind Toyota and Great Taste after 18 games in the elimination phase. In the four-team semifinal round, the Jeans Makers swept the first round with three straight victories but lost their next two games before routing Great Taste in the last playing date on July 20 to create a triple-tie for the two finals berth. The U/Tex Wranglers secured the first finals seat, leaving Toyota and Walk Tall to dispute the other berth via playoff. The Jeans Makers lost to Toyota Tamaraws, 100–102, in the do-or-die game on July 22.

Byron "Snake" Jones, who previously played for Toyota and U/Tex and was Honda's import in the Open Conference, was acquired by Walk Tall for the Invitational championship to team up with Sylvester Cuyler. Walk Tall Jeans were denied of a finals seat for the second time by their arch rivals Toyota Tamaraws and place fourth after being swept in two games by the visiting Adidas/France in their series for third place.

=== 19-game win streak & 8th PBA title ===
Two players namely Bernardo Carpio and Frank Natividad from Crispa's farm team in the MICAA were elevated to the pros as the ballclub return to Crispa Redmanizers in the All-Filipino Third Conference. They capped the season-ending conference with an incredible 19-game winning streak, sweeping their games in the eliminations, round of six, semifinals and the first two games of the finals. The Redmanizers failed to sweep the whole conference when they lost Game three of the finals series against Toyota that snapped their winning run. Two nights later in Game four on December 13, the Redmanizers didn't allow the Tamaraws to gain momentum as they raced to a 24-point lead in the second quarter and coasted to a 105–91 victory and a 3–1 series win for their 8th league championship.

== Notable dates ==
November 18: Philip Cezar scored 29 points and becomes the fifth player to hit 5,000 point career mark as Crispa beats Tanduay, 151–113.

December 2: Freddie Hubalde scored a personal-high 45 points while Atoy Co added 32 points as the Redmanizers clinch the first finals seat in the All-Filipino Conference, routing Toyota Tamaraws, 143–114. Crispa remained unbeaten in the conference, winning their 16th straight game.

== Award ==
Philip Cezar was voted as the season's Most Valuable Player (MVP).

== Win–loss record vs opponents ==
Teams	Win	Loss	1st (Open)	2nd (Invitational)	3rd (All-Filipino)
Galleon Shippers	3	0	2-0	N/A	1-0
Gilbey's Gin	5	0	2-0	N/A	3-0
Great Taste / Presto	7	1	6-1	N/A	1-0
Honda	3	0	2-0	N/A	1-0
Royal / San Miguel	4	0	2-0	N/A	2-0
Tanduay	4	1	1-1	N/A	3-0
Tefilin	2	1	1-1	N/A	1-0
Toyota Tamaraws	8	6	1-4	1-1	6-1
U-Tex Wranglers	6	2	2-2	2-0	2-0
Adidas (France)	1	3	N/A	1-3	N/A
Nicholas Stoodley (USA)	1	1	N/A	1-1	N/A
Total	44	15	19-9	5-5	20-1

== Roster ==
Crispa Redmanizers roster
Players
Coaches

Pos.	No.	Nat.	Name	Ht.	Wt.
C	5	(Philippines)	Abet Guidaben	6 ft 5 in (1.96 m)		USJ–R
G	6	(Philippines)	Fortunato Co, Jr	6 ft 1 in (1.85 m)		Mapúa
F	7	(Philippines)	Rodolfo Soriano	6 ft 2 in (1.88 m)		UE
C	8	(Philippines)	Jaime Javier	6 ft 5 in (1.96 m)		José Rizal
G	9	(Philippines)	Gregorio Dionisio	5 ft 9 in (1.75 m)		Adamson
G/F	10	(Philippines)	Freddie Hubalde	6 ft 1 in (1.85 m)		Mapúa
F	2 & 11	(United States)	Sylvester Cuyler (I)	6 ft 8 in (2.03 m)		Marymount (KS)
G/F	12	(Philippines)	Virgilio Dela Cruz	6 ft 3 in (1.91 m)		Mapúa
G	14	(Philippines)	Tito Varela	6 ft 1 in (1.85 m)		UE
G	15	(Philippines)	Bernie Fabiosa	5 ft 9 in (1.75 m)		UE
G	16	(Philippines)	Frank Natividad	6 ft 1 in (1.85 m)		UST
C	17	(Philippines)	Romulo Mamaril	6 ft 6 in (1.98 m)		Mapúa
F	18	(Philippines)	Philip Cezar	6 ft 3 in (1.91 m)		José Rizal
F	19	(Philippines)	Bernardo Carpio	6 ft 3 in (1.91 m)		Ateneo
F	24	(Philippines)	Filomeno Gulfin	6 ft 2 in (1.88 m)		Southwestern-U
F/C	33	(United States)	Byron Jones (I)	6 ft 9 in (2.06 m)		San Francisco
G	34	(Philippines)	Edmundo Espinosa	5 ft 9 in (1.75 m)		Southwestern-U
F	35	(United States)	Glenn Mosley (I)	6 ft 8 in (2.03 m)		Seton Hall
F/C	43	(United States)	Larry Boston (I)	6 ft 8 in (2.03 m)		Maryland

Head coach

- (Philippines) Baby Dalupan

Assistant coach(es)

Legend

- (C) Team captain
- (I) Import
- Injured

=== Subtraction ===
Player	Number	Position	Height	New Team
Bogs Adornado	11	Guard-Forward	6 ft 1 in (1.85 m)	U-Tex Wranglers
