= 1975 U-Tex Weavers season =

1975 U/Tex Weavers season
- Head coach: Carlos Loyzaga; Napoleon Flores; Narciso Bernardo

First Conference results
- Record: 16–11 (59.3%)
- Place: 3rd
- Playoff finish: Semifinals

Second Conference results
- Record: 7–7 (50%)
- Place: 5th
- Playoff finish: Round of six

All-Philippine Championship results
- Record: 3–5 (37.5%)
- Place: 3rd
- Playoff finish: N/A

U/Tex Weavers seasons

The 1975 U-Tex Weavers season was the 1st season of the franchise in the Philippine Basketball Association (PBA).

== First Conference standings ==
#	Teams	W	L	PCT	GB
1	Toyota Tamaraws	13	3	.812	–-
2	Crispa Redmanizers	12	4	.750	1
3	U-Tex Weavers	10	6	.625	3
4	Royal Tru-Orange	10	6	.625	3
5	Mariwasa-Noritake	8	8	.500	5
6	Concepcion Carrier	7	9	.438	6
7	Tanduay Distillery	5	11	.312	8
8	CFC-Presto	5	11	.312	8
9	Seven-Up	2	14	.125	11

== Summary ==
The U-Tex Weavers played in the main game of the PBA's inaugural day on April 9, losing to Toyota Comets, 101-105, Danny Florencio and Larry Mumar topscored for the Weavers with 29 points each. Just like Toyota and Noritake, which acquired American reinforcements in the first conference in Byron 'Snake' Jones and Cisco Oliver respectively, the Weavers would soon signed Charles Walker to beefed up the local squad. The Weavers finishes with 10 wins and six losses after the two-round eliminations. In the semifinals, the Weavers forged a tie with Crispa for second place as both teams ended up with a 3-3 win-loss card as first finalist Toyota completed a two-round semifinals sweep. The first-ever playoff match in PBA history took place on July 22. U-Tex lost to Crispa, 113-121, as the Redmanizers earned the right to meet Toyota in the first conference finals. U-Tex placed third with a 3-1 series victory over Royal Tru-Orange.

Team	Game				Series
Team	1	2	3	4	Series
U-Tex Weavers	110	122	121	125	3
Royal Tru-Orange	116	113	118	113	1

In the second conference, the Weavers had Lee Haven and Michael Truell as their imports. U-Tex finished with five wins and three losses in a triple-tie for second place along with Noritake and Carrier and a game behind Toyota, Crispa and Royal with six wins and two losses in the one-round eliminations. In the round of six, the Weavers lost to Noritake, 105-107, in a playoff for the fourth and last semifinals berth. U-Tex played that game without their coach, Caloy Loyzaga, who resigned and former national player Nap Flores calls the shots for the Weavers.

U-Tex qualified in the All-Philippine championship in the third conference and placed third behind Crispa and Toyota. The Weavers defeated Royal Tru-Orange again and the series for third place went the full route of five games.

== Roster ==
Roster	#	Position	Height
Virgilio Abarrientos	9	Guard	5 ft 5 in (1.65 m)
Danilo Basilan	14	Guard	5 ft 9 in (1.75 m)
Roehl Deles	12	Center-Forward	6 ft 3 in (1.91 m)
Orlando Delos Santos	10	Guard	5 ft 8 in (1.73 m)
Danny Florencio	8	Guard-Forward	5 ft 10 in (1.78 m)
Romeo Frank	15	Center-Forward	6 ft 2 in (1.88 m)
Edgardo Gomez	17	Center-Forward	6 ft 2 in (1.88 m)
Rudolf Kutch	13	Center-Forward	6 ft 3 in (1.91 m)
George Lizares	11	Forward	5 ft 10 in (1.78 m)
Lawrence Mumar	7	Guard	5 ft 11 in (1.80 m)
Jaime Otazu	18	Guard	5 ft 9 in (1.75 m)
Ricardo Pineda	6	Guard	5 ft 9 in (1.75 m)
Arturo Valenzona	21	Forward	5 ft 9 in (1.75 m)
Roberto Victorino	19	Center	6 ft 2 in (1.88 m)
Lee Haven ^{Import}	22	Guard-Forward	6 ft 4 in (1.93 m)
Mike Truell ^{Import}	23	Center-Forward	6 ft 9 in (2.06 m)
