= PBA Rookie of the Year award =

The Philippine Basketball Association's Rookie of the Year award is an annual Philippine Basketball Association (PBA) award given to the top rookie(s) of the regular season. The award was first given in 1976.

The award is decided using criteria introduced for the 2011–12 season, which include accumulated statistical points, votes from media, players and the league's Commissioner's Office.

The most recent Rookie of the Year winner is RJ Abarrientos. Twelve winners were drafted first overall (the league started its draft in the 1985 season). Six winners have also won the PBA Most Valuable Player (MVP) award in their careers; with Benjie Paras earning the honors the same season. Three winners have been elected to the PBA Hall of Fame.

== Winners ==
Key
^	Denotes player who is still active in the PBA
*	Elected to the PBA Hall of Fame
DP #	Draft pick number
DY	Draft year
D	direct hire

Rookie of the Year
Season	Player	Position	Country of birth	Team	School	DP #	DY (Note: The PBA draft was instituted in 1985.)	Ref.
1976	Gil Cortez	Center / Power forward	Philippines	Toyota Super Corollas	San Beda	n/a	n/a	
1977	Jimmy Taguines	Center / Power forward	Philippines	Tanduay Rhum Makers	San Beda	n/a	n/a	
1978	Jimmy Manansala	Shooting guard / Small forward	Philippines	Tanduay Rhum Makers	UE	n/a	n/a	
1979	Arnie Tuadles	Small forward	Philippines	Toyota Super Corollas	UV	n/a	n/a	
1980	Willie Generalao	Point guard	Philippines	Gilbey's Gin	UV	n/a	n/a	
1981	Rafael Sison	Shooting guard	Philippines	Presto Fun Drinks	Ateneo de Davao	n/a	n/a	
1982	Marte Saldaña	Point guard	Philippines	San Miguel Beermen	FEU	n/a	n/a	
1983	Ricardo Brown*	Point guard	United States	Great Taste Coffee Makers	Pepperdine	n/a	n/a	
1984	Willie Pearson	Shooting guard / Small forward	United States	Crispa Redmanizers	Chaminade	n/a	n/a	
1985	Leo Austria	Point guard	Philippines	Shell Azodrin Bugbusters	Lyceum	10	1985	
1986	Dondon Ampalayo	Power forward	Philippines	Ginebra San Miguel	USJ-R	2	1986	
1987	Allan Caidic*	Shooting guard	Philippines	Great Taste Coffee Makers	UE	1	1987	
1988	Jojo Lastimosa	Shooting guard	Philippines	Purefoods Hotdogs	Ateneo/USJ-R	D	1988	
1989	Benjie Paras*	Center	Philippines	Formula Shell Zoom Masters	UP Diliman	1	1989	
1990	Gerry Esplana	Point guard	Philippines	Presto Tivolis	FEU	9	1990	
1991	Eugene Quilban	Point guard	Philippines	Alaska Milkmen	San Sebastian	3	1991	
1992	Bong Ravena	Shooting guard / Small forward	Philippines	San Miguel Beermen	UE	5	1992	
1993	Jun Limpot	Center	Philippines	Sta. Lucia Realtors	De La Salle	1	1993	
1994	Boybits Victoria	Point guard	Philippines	Swift Mighty Meaties	San Beda	3	1994	
1995	Jeffrey Cariaso	Shooting guard / Small forward	United States	Alaska Milkmen	Sonoma State	6	1995	
1996	Marlou Aquino	Center	Philippines	Ginebra San Miguel	Adamson	1	1996	
1997	Andy Seigle	Center	United States	Mobiline Phone Pals	New Orleans	1	1997	
1998	Danny Ildefonso	Center	Philippines	San Miguel Beermen	NU	1	1998	
1999	Danny Seigle	Small forward	United States	San Miguel Beermen	Wagner	D	1999	
2000	Davonn Harp	Center	United States	Batang Red Bull Energizers	Kutztown	D	2000	
2001	Mark Caguioa	Shooting guard	Philippines	Barangay Ginebra Kings	Glendale Community College	3	2001	
2002	Renren Ritualo	Shooting guard	Philippines	FedEx Express	De La Salle	8	2002	
2003	Jimmy Alapag	Point guard	United States	Talk 'N Text Phone Pals	Cal State San Bernardino	10	2003	
2004–05	Rich Alvarez	Power forward / Small forward	Japan	Shell Turbo Chargers	Ateneo	1	2004	
2005–06	Larry Fonacier	Shooting guard / Small forward	Philippines	Red Bull Barako	Ateneo	14	2005	
2006–07	Kelly Williams^	Power forward	United States	Sta. Lucia Realtors	Oakland	1	2006	
2007–08	Ryan Reyes	Shooting guard	United States	Sta. Lucia Realtors	Cal State Fullerton	3	2007	
2008–09	Gabe Norwood	Small forward	United States	Rain or Shine Elasto Painters	George Mason	1	2008	
2009–10	Rico Maierhofer	Power forward	Philippines	B-Meg Derby Ace Llamados	De La Salle	2	2009	
2010–11	Rabeh Al-Hussaini	Center	Philippines	Petron Blaze Boosters	Ateneo	2	2010	
2011–12	Paul Lee^	Point guard / Shooting guard	Philippines	Rain or Shine Elasto Painters	UE	2	2011	
2012–13	Calvin Abueva^	Small forward / Power forward	Philippines	Alaska Aces	San Sebastian	2	2012	
2013–14	Greg Slaughter	Center	United States	Barangay Ginebra San Miguel	Ateneo	1	2013	
2014–15	Stanley Pringle^	Point guard / Shooting guard	United States	GlobalPort Batang Pier	Penn State	1	2014	
2015–16	Chris Newsome^	Shooting guard / Small forward	United States	Meralco Bolts	Ateneo	4	2015	
2016–17	Roger Pogoy^	Shooting guard / Small forward	Philippines	TNT KaTropa	FEU	n/a	2016	
2017–18	Jason Perkins^	Power forward	Philippines	Phoenix Fuel Masters	De La Salle	4	2017	
2019	CJ Perez^	Shooting guard / Small forward	Hong Kong	Columbian Dyip	Lyceum/San Sebastian	1	2018	
2020 (Note: The 2020 season only had one conference. The award was renamed as "Outstanding Rookie" for this season.)	Aaron Black^	Point guard / Shooting guard	Philippines	Meralco Bolts	Ateneo	18	2019	
2021	Mikey Williams^	Point guard / Shooting guard	United States	TNT Tropang Giga	Cal State Fullerton	4	2020	
2022–23	Justin Arana^	Center	Philippines	Converge FiberXers	Arellano/UST	4	2021	
2023–24	Stephen Holt^	Shooting guard / Small forward	United States	Terrafirma Dyip	Saint Mary's	1	2023	
2024–25	RJ Abarrientos^	Point guard	Philippines	Barangay Ginebra San Miguel	FEU	3	2024	
