= Philippine Basketball Association Hall of Fame =

Institution that honors selected former players and personalities

The Philippine Basketball Association Hall of Fame is an institution that honors selected former players and personalities of the Philippine Basketball Association. It was launched on May 29, 2005, during the Reunion Game pitting two teams consisting of the 25 Greatest Players in PBA History. In 2005, it inducted its first 12 members to the group.

== Inductees ==
Year	Inductee	Achievements
2005	Robert Jaworski	1978 PBA Most Valuable Player. 23 seasons in the PBA as player and coach.
2005	Ramon Fernandez	Four-time PBA Most Valuable Player (1982, 1984, 1986, 1988)
2005	Atoy Co	1979 PBA Most Valuable Player
2005	Philip Cezar	1980 PBA Most Valuable Player
2005	Bogs Adornado	Three-time PBA Most Valuable Player (1975, 1976, 1981)
2005	Francis Arnaiz	Three-time Mythical Five member. Played 12 seasons for Toyota and Ginebra San Miguel
2005	Baby Dalupan	Led three teams (Crispa, Great Taste & Purefoods) to PBA titles as coach. The first grand slam winning coach (1976)
2005	Leo Prieto	Founding PBA Commissioner
2005	Emerson Coseteng	Founding PBA President (1975)
2005	Rudy Salud	Third PBA commissioner; drafted league constitution
2005	Danny Floro	Crispa Redmanizers team manager
2005	José María "Joe" Cantada	Play-by-play commentator for Vintage Sports during the 1980s
2007	Abet Guidaben	Two-time PBA Most Valuable Player (1983, 1987)
2007	Manny Paner	One of the top big men in the league's early years.
2007	Danny Florencio	Played several years with Toyota.
2007	Norman Black	PBA import and later coach of the grand slam winning San Miguel Beermen in 1989
2007	Ron Jacobs	Head coach (Northern Cement and San Miguel).
2007	Domingo Itchon	Second PBA president (1976-1982), Tanduay (Elizalde era) team manager, Philippines men's national basketball team manager
2007	Danding Cojuangco	Team owner (Northern Cement, San Miguel Beermen, Barangay Ginebra San Miguel, and Star Hotshots)
2007	Dante Silverio	Head coach (Toyota, Shell). Winning coach of five PBA titles.
2007	Tony Siddayao	Sportswriter
2007	Delfin "Pinggoy" Pengson	Play-by-play commentator for Vintage Sports during the 1980s
2009	Bobby Parks	Seven-time Best Import awardee.
2009	Allan Caidic	1987 Rookie of the Year, 1990 PBA Most Valuable Player
2009	Samboy Lim	Known as The Skywalker for his daredevil drives to the basket.
2009	Hector Calma	Known as The Director for his manning at the point guard spot.
2009	Ricardo Brown	Rookie of the Year (1983), MVP (1985), the first Filipino-American to play in the PBA, drafted by Houston Rockets in 1979.
2009	Jun Bernardino	Fifth commissioner of the PBA
2009	Carlos "Honeyboy" Palanca III	PBA president and former team governor of Ginebra San Miguel.
2011	Alvin Patrimonio	Four-time PBA Most Valuable Player (1991, 1993, 1994, 1997)
2011	Billy Ray Bates	Import of the 1983 Crispa Redmanizers grand slam squad
2011	Freddie Hubalde	1977 PBA Most Valuable Player
2011	Tommy Manotoc	Head coach (U/Tex, San Miguel Beer, Crispa).
2011	Valentin "Tito" Eduque	Head coach (Concepcion/Carrier, Mariwasa-Honda, YCO-Tanduay, Galerie Dominique, Manila Beer).
2011	Mariano Yenko	Second commissioner of the PBA.
2011	Carlos "Bobong" Velez	CEO of Vintage Enterprises, Inc., the coverer of the PBA games from 1982 to 2002.
2013	Lim Eng Beng	1978 mythical five member, one of the 25 Greatest Players in PBA History.
2013	Ed Ocampo	Head coach (Royal Tru-Orange, Toyota, Pepsi).
2013	Ronnie Magsanoc	Four-time mythical team member (1989, 1990, 1991, 1992). One of the 25 Greatest Players in PBA History.
2013	Benjie Paras	Two-time MVP awardee (1989, 1999). The only Rookie to win the MVP award. One of the 25 Greatest Players in PBA History.

== Ceremony dates and locations ==
Date	Location	Venue
May 2005	Quezon City	Araneta Coliseum
April 8, 2007	Quezon City	Araneta Coliseum
October 9, 2009	Makati	Makati Shangri-La, Manila
October 2, 2011	Quezon City	Smart Araneta Coliseum
November 17, 2013	Quezon City	Smart Araneta Coliseum
