= PBA Most Valuable Player award =

Annual Philippine Basketball Association (PBA) award

The Philippine Basketball Association Most Valuable Player (MVP) is an annual Philippine Basketball Association (PBA) award given since the start of the league in 1975 to the best performing player of the season. The award is decided using criteria introduced since the 2011–12 season, which include accumulated statistical points, votes from media, players and the league's Commissioner's Office. The current holder of the award is June Mar Fajardo.

The season MVP is for the whole season, which has two to three conferences, including the regular season, the playoffs and the Finals, while there is a Best Player of the Conference award for each conference, and a Best Import award for conferences where imports are allowed to play.

June Mar Fajardo won the MVP award a record nine times, while both Ramon Fernandez and Alvin Patrimonio won the award four times. Benjie Paras remains the only rookie to have ever won the award to date, which he did during the 1989 season.

As with the other annual awards given by the league, the winner receives The Leo Trophy, which is named in honor of Leo Prieto, the first commissioner of the PBA who served from 1975 until his retirement in 1983.

== Criteria ==
The criteria used since the 2022–23 PBA season are as follows:

- 45% average statistical points
- 30% press and media votes
- 25% players' votes

Statistical points (SP) are computed as follows:

- 1 SP for every point scored, rebound assist, steal and shot blocked.
- 10 bonus points for every game won where the player played up to the semifinals.
- 15 bonus points for every game won where the player played in the Finals
- Deduction of 1 SP for every turnover, 5 SP for every technical or flagrant foul without ejection, and 15 SP for any technical or flagrant foul that results in an ejection.

In addition, a Filipino player can only be eligible for awards if he played in at least 70% of his team's games.

MVP voting begins at the start of the Finals series of the last conference. All statistical points gathered from all levels of competition (elimination/classification round and playoffs) are included.

=== Previous criteria ===
The winner was selected by the following format (before 2006):

- 30% cumulative statistical points (points, rebounds, assists, blocks, turnovers etc.)
- 30% press and media votes
- 30% players' votes
- 10% four-man committee (representatives from the PBA Photographer's Group, SCOOP, the TV coverer and the Philippine Sportswriters Association)

With controversies with the selections, a new format was created starting at the 2006–07 season:

- 30% average statistical points
- 30% press and media votes
- 25% players' votes
- 10% TV coverer
- 5% Commissioner's Office

The criteria used since from the 2011–12 PBA season until the 2021 PBA season are as follows:

- 40% average statistical points
- 30% press and media votes
- 25% players' votes
- 5% Commissioner's Office

== Winners ==
^	Denotes player who is still active in the PBA
*	Inducted into the PBA Hall of Fame
Player (X)	Denotes the number of times the player has been named MVP
Team (X)	Denotes the number of times a player from this team has won

Season	Player	Position	Country of birth	Team	Ref.
1975	Bogs Adornado*	Small forward	Philippines	Crispa Redmanizers	
1976	Bogs Adornado* (2)	Small forward	Philippines	Crispa Redmanizers (2)	
1977	Freddie Hubalde*	Small forward / Shooting guard	Philippines	Crispa Redmanizers (3)	
1978	Robert Jaworski*	Point guard	Philippines	Toyota Super Corollas	
1979	Atoy Co*	Shooting guard	Philippines	Crispa Redmanizers (4)	
1980	Philip Cezar*	Power forward	Philippines	Crispa Redmanizers (5)	
1981	Bogs Adornado* (3)	Small forward	Philippines	U/Tex Wranglers	
1982	Ramon Fernandez*	Center / Power forward	Philippines	Toyota Super Corollas (2)	
1983	Abet Guidaben*	Center	Philippines	Crispa Redmanizers (6)	
1984	Ramon Fernandez* (2)	Center / Power forward	Philippines	Beer Hausen Brewmasters	
1985	Ricardo Brown*	Point guard	United States	Great Taste Coffee Makers	
1986	Ramon Fernandez* (3)	Center / Power forward	Philippines	Tanduay Rhum Makers	
1987	Abet Guidaben* (2)	Center	Philippines	San Miguel Beermen	
1988	Ramon Fernandez* (4)	Center / Power forward	Philippines	San Miguel Beermen (2)	
1989	Benjie Paras*	Center	Philippines	Formula Shell Zoom Masters	
1990	Allan Caidic*	Shooting guard	Philippines	Presto Tivolis	
1991	Alvin Patrimonio*	Power forward	Philippines	Purefoods Tender Juicy Hotdogs	
1992	Ato Agustin	Shooting guard / Point guard	Philippines	San Miguel Beermen (3)	
1993	Alvin Patrimonio* (2)	Power forward	Philippines	Purefoods Tender Juicy Hotdogs (2)	
1994	Alvin Patrimonio* (3)	Power forward	Philippines	Purefoods Tender Juicy Hotdogs (3)	
1995	Vergel Meneses	Shooting guard / Small forward	Philippines	Sunkist Orange Juicers	
1996	Johnny Abarrientos	Point guard	Philippines	Alaska Milkmen	
1997	Alvin Patrimonio* (4)	Power forward	Philippines	Purefoods Carne Norte Beefies (4)	
1998	Kenneth Duremdes	Small forward / Shooting guard	Philippines	Alaska Milkmen (2)	
1999	Benjie Paras* (2)	Center	Philippines	Shell Velocity (2)	
2000	Danny Ildefonso	Power forward / Center	Philippines	San Miguel Beermen (4)	
2001	Danny Ildefonso (2)	Power forward / Center	Philippines	San Miguel Beermen (5)	
2002	Willie Miller	Shooting guard	Philippines	Red Bull Thunder	
2003	Asi Taulava	Center	Tonga	Talk 'N Text Phone Pals	
2004–05	Eric Menk	Power forward / Center	United States	Barangay Ginebra Kings	
2005–06	James Yap	Shooting guard / Small forward	Philippines	Purefoods Chunkee Giants (5)	
2006–07	Willie Miller (2)	Shooting guard	Philippines	Alaska Aces (3)	
2007–08	Kelly Williams^	Power forward	United States	Sta. Lucia Realtors	
2008–09	Jayjay Helterbrand	Point guard / Shooting guard	Philippines	Barangay Ginebra Kings (2)	
2009–10	James Yap (2)	Shooting guard / Small forward	Philippines	B-Meg Derby Ace Llamados (6)	
2010–11	Jimmy Alapag	Point guard	United States	Talk 'N Text Tropang Texters (2)	
2011–12	Mark Caguioa	Shooting guard	Philippines	Barangay Ginebra Kings (3)	
2012–13	Arwind Santos	Power forward	Philippines	Petron Blaze Boosters (6)	
2013–14	June Mar Fajardo^	Center	Philippines	San Miguel Beermen (7)	
2014–15	June Mar Fajardo^ (2)	Center	Philippines	San Miguel Beermen (8)	
2015–16	June Mar Fajardo^ (3)	Center	Philippines	San Miguel Beermen (9)	
2016–17	June Mar Fajardo^ (4)	Center	Philippines	San Miguel Beermen (10)	
2017–18	June Mar Fajardo^ (5)	Center	Philippines	San Miguel Beermen (11)	
2019	June Mar Fajardo^ (6)	Center	Philippines	San Miguel Beermen (12)	
2020	not awarded				
2021	Scottie Thompson^	Shooting guard / Point guard	Philippines	Barangay Ginebra San Miguel (4)	
2022–23	June Mar Fajardo^ (7)	Center	Philippines	San Miguel Beermen (13)	
2023–24	June Mar Fajardo^ (8)	Center	Philippines	San Miguel Beermen (14)	
2024–25	June Mar Fajardo^ (9)	Center	Philippines	San Miguel Beermen (15)	

== Multiple-time winners ==
Total	Player	Years
9	(Philippines) June Mar Fajardo	2014–2019, 2022–2025
4	(Philippines) Ramon Fernandez	1982, 1984, 1986, 1988
4	(Philippines) Alvin Patrimonio	1991, 1993, 1994, 1997
3	(Philippines) Bogs Adornado	1975, 1976, 1981
2	(Philippines) Abet Guidaben	1983, 1987
2	(Philippines) Danny Ildefonso	2000, 2001
2	(Philippines) Willie Miller	2002, 2007
2	(Philippines) Benjie Paras	1989, 1999
2	(Philippines) James Yap	2006, 2010
