= 1979 PBA season =

Fifth PBA season

- Duration: April 1 – December 15, 1979
- Teams: 9
- TV partner: GTV
- Season MVP: Fortunato Co, Jr. (Crispa Redmanizers)
- All-Filipino Conference champions: Crispa Redmanizers
- All-Filipino Conference runners-up: Toyota Tamaraws
- Open Conference champions: Royal Tru-Orange
- Open Conference runners-up: Toyota Tamaraws
- Invitational championship champions: Toyota Tamaraws
- Invitational championship runners-up: Walk Tall Jeansmakers

Seasons
- ← 1978 1980 →

The 1979 PBA season was the fifth season of the Philippine Basketball Association (PBA).

== Season highlights ==
- After a two-year absence of playing against each other in the championship between the league's most noted rivalry, Crispa and Toyota played once again in the finals during the All-Filipino Conference. Crispa prevailed in five games, winning the deciding game, 118–111 on July 7.
- On September 4, the visiting Washington Bullets, which lost to Seattle SuperSonics in the 1979 NBA Finals, played against a PBA All-Star Selection at the Araneta Coliseum in an exhibition game attended by Philippines First Lady Imelda Marcos, the Bullets with the line-up of hall of famers Elvin Hayes, Wes Unseld and among others, Greg Ballard, Dave Corzine and coach by Dick Motta, won the match, 133–123. The PBA selection, made up of one local player from each of the nine PBA teams that year, was coached by Baby Dalupan and reinforced by five imports.
- Royal Tru-Orange won their first PBA title in the Open Conference by defeating Toyota Tamaraws, 102–101 in Game 4 for a 3–1 series win. Imports Otto Moore and Larry Pounds led the Orangemen as they became only the fourth team to win a championship in the 1970s apart from Toyota, Crispa and U/tex.
- Three different teams emerged champions in the league's fifth season as the Toyota Tamaraws avoided a third runner-up finish by winning the invitational championship against rival Crispa Walk Tall Jeans.

== Opening ceremonies ==
The muses for the participating teams are as follows:

Team	Muse
Crispa Redmanizers	Pearl Razon
Filmanbank	Regina Prada
Gilbey's Gin	Chris Stuttard and Ann Rose Blas
Great Taste Discoverers	Carolina Lacap
Honda Wildcats	Beth de Mesa
Royal Tru-Orange	Joanna Paras
Tanduay Esquires	Bessie Badilla and Diane Benisano
Toyota Tamaraws	Alicia Cuenca
U/Tex Wranglers	Janet Bordon

== Champions ==
- All Filipino Conference: Crispa Redmanizers
- Open Conference: Royal Tru-Orange
- Invitational championship: Toyota Tamaraws
- Team with best win–loss percentage: Toyota Tamaraws (44–18, .710)
- Best Team of the Year: Toyota Tamaraws (3rd)

== Individual awards ==
- Most Valuable Player: Atoy Co (Crispa)
- Rookie of the Year: Arnie Tuadles (Toyota)
- Mythical Five:
  - Robert Jaworski (Toyota)
  - Atoy Co (Crispa)
  - Ramon Fernandez (Toyota)
  - Arnie Tuadles (Toyota)
  - Philip Cezar (Crispa)

== Board of governors ==
- Leopoldo Prieto (Commissioner)
- Domingo Itchon (President, Elizalde and Co., Inc.)
- Dante Silverio (Vice-President, Delta Motor Corporation)
- Walter Euyang (Treasurer, Universal Textile Mills)
- Jose Castro, Jr. (Executive Secretary)
- Pablo Carlos (Delta Motor Corporation)
- Valeriano "Danny" Floro (P. Floro and Sons)
- Emerson Coseteng (Mariwasa Group)
- Leonardo "Skip" Guinto (San Miguel Corporation)
- Porfirio Zablan (CFC Corporation)
- Carlos Palanca III (La Tondeña, Inc.)

== Cumulative standings ==
Team	GP	W	L	PCT
Toyota Tamaraws	62	44	18	.710
Crispa Redmanizers/Walk Tall Jeansmakers	62	42	20	.677
Royal Tru-Orange	47	28	19	.596
U/Tex Wranglers	44	23	21	.528
Tanduay Esquires	47	24	23	.511
Great Taste Discoverers	47	21	26	.447
Filmanbank Bankers	47	16	31	.340
Gilbey's Gin	44	13	31	.295
Honda Wildcats	36	7	29	.194

Elimination Round (All-Filipino Conference / Open Conference)
Team	W	L	PCT
Toyota	26	6	.813
Crispa	25	7	.781
Royal	19	13	.594
Great Taste	17	15	.531
Tanduay	16	16	.500
U/Tex	16	16	.500
Filmanbank	14	18	.438
Honda	6	26	.188
Gilbey's	6	26	.188
