= 1977 PBA season =

Third PBA season

- Duration: April 17 – December 18, 1977
- Teams: 8
- TV partner: KBS/RPN
- Season MVP: Freddie Hubalde (Crispa Redmanizers)
- All-Filipino Conference champions: Crispa Redmanizers
- All-Filipino Conference runners-up: Mariwasa/Honda Panthers
- Open Conference champions: Crispa Redmanizers
- Open Conference runners-up: U/Tex Wranglers
- Invitational Championship champions: Toyota Tamaraws
- Invitational Championship runners-up: Emtex Sacronels/Brazil

Seasons
- ← 1976 1978 →

The 1977 PBA season was the third season of the Philippine Basketball Association (PBA).

== Season highlights ==
- The league's third season started on April 17 and for the first time, three referees were called to officiate the games. The opening game between Crispa and Toyota, where the Redmanizers edged out the Tamaraws, 122–121, was marred by a post-game rumble involving players from both teams that erupted at the Araneta Coliseum hardcourt and extended to the dugout. The brawl resulted in the arrest and booking of all 13 Crispa and 10 Toyota players at the stockade of Camp Crame where they were held for 13 hours. PBA Commissioner Leo Prieto fined both teams ₱5,000 (equivalent to ₱141,210 in 2021) each for that melee.
- On July 12, Mariwasa beats Toyota, 121–114, to set the stage for the first non Crispa-Toyota title-showdown.
- Crispa wins the All-Filipino crown and their fifth consecutive championship by defeating Mariwasa-Honda Panthers. The Redmanizers continued its dynasty and a quest for another grandslam by winning its sixth straight title, defeating U/Tex Wranglers for the Open crown.
- Toyota Tamaraws ended Crispa's reign by winning the Invitational championship, sweeping Emtex Sacronels (Palmeiras) of Brazil, bannered by Oscar Schmidt, to complete the first ever 3–0 finals sweep in PBA history. Also seeing action in that conference were the Ramrod Blocks (Melbourne Panthers) of Australia.

== All-star games ==
On August 7, Trust beats More, 135–124, to win the P82,000 battle of PBA superstars at the Araneta Coliseum on a 2–1 score. Players for Trust were Rudolf Kutch, Rosalio Martirez, Jun Papa, Jesse Sullano, Estoy Estrada, Romy Cabading, Danilo Basilan, Atoy Co, Philip Cezar, Bernie Fabiosa, Freddie Hubalde and Rudy Soriano, while the More line-up were consist of Manny Paner, Jimmy Mariano, Freddie Webb, Jaime Taguines, Larry Mumar, Johnny Revilla, Robert Jaworski, Francis Arnaiz, Ramon Fernandez, Jess Sta. Maria and Abe King.

== Champions ==
- All-Filipino Conference: Crispa Redmanizers
- Open Conference: Crispa Redmanizers
- Invitational Championship: Toyota Tamaraws
- Team with best win–loss percentage: Crispa Redmanizers (49–15, .766)
- Best Team of the Year: Crispa Redmanizers (2nd)

== Individual awards ==
- Most Valuable Player: Freddie Hubalde (Crispa)
- Rookie of the Year: Jimmy Taguines (Tanduay)
- Mythical Five:
  - Robert Jaworski (Toyota)
  - Atoy Co (Crispa)
  - Ramon Fernandez (Toyota)
  - Freddie Hubalde (Crispa)
  - Adriano Papa, Jr. (Mariwasa)

== Cumulative standings ==
Team	GP	W	L	PCT
Crispa Redmanizers	64	49	15	.766
Emtex Sacronels/Brazil	10	7	3	.700
Toyota Tamaraws	63	41	22	.651
U/Tex Wranglers	50	27	23	.540
Tanduay Distillery	57	29	28	.509
Mariwasa/Honda Panthers	45	16	29	.355
Seven-Up Uncolas	43	15	28	.349
Presto Ice Cream	45	15	30	.333
Ramrod Blocks/Australia	7	2	5	.286
Royal Tru-Orange	28	5	23	.178

Elimination Round All-Filipino Conference / Open Conference
Team	W	L	PCT
Crispa	24	4	.857
Toyota	18	10	.643
Tanduay	18	10	.643
Presto	14	14	.500
U/Tex	14	14	.500
Mariwasa/Honda	10	18	.357
7-Up	9	19	.321
Royal	5	23	.178
