= Jimmy Noblezada =

Filipino former basketball player (born 1950)

Personal information
- Born: December 26, 1950 (age 75) Miagao, Iloilo, Philippines
- Listed height: 6 ft 2 in (1.88 m)
- Listed weight: 178 lb (81 kg)

Career information
- College: University of San Agustin
- Position: Forward

Career history
- ?–1977: Concepcion
- 1977–1981: U/Tex Wranglers

Career highlights
- 2× PBA champion (1978 Open, 1980 Open)
Medals
Men's basketball
Representing Philippines
ABC Under-18 Championship
Gold medal – first place	1972 Manila	Team

Jaime "Jimmy" Noblezada (born December 26, 1950) is a Filipino retired professional basketball player who played for Concepcion Carrier and the U/Tex Wranglers in the Philippine Basketball Association (PBA).

== Early life and education ==
Noblezada was born on December 26, 1950 in Miagao, Iloilo. He studied at the University of San Agustin. He also worked as a kargador at a seaport in Bacolod.

== Career ==
=== Concepcion at MICAA ===
Noblezada played in the Manila Industrial Commercial Athletic Association (MICAA) for Concepcion Industries. He was known by the moniker "Taong Bato" (lit. 'stone man')

=== PBA career ===
Noblezada is among the first players of the Philippine Basketball Association playing in the inaugural game April 9, 1975 for Concepcion Carrier against Mariwasa Noritake. He is the original "Iron Man" in the PBA, a moniker given to him by league broadcaster Dick Ildefonso.

He is also the first local player to score more than 20-points, featuring in a 98–101 loss for Concepcion.

He moved to U/Tex Wranglers in 1977. He won the 1978 and 1980 Open Conferences

Noblezada retired in 1981 having played 275 games and averaging 10.5 points in the PBA, to focus on his family life.

== National team ==
Noblezada is a member of the Philippine youth national team which won the 1972 ABC Under-18 Championship.

== Personal life ==
Noblezada is married to a woman who was an alumna of Saint Paul College in Quezon City, with whom he had three daughters. Noblezada married his wife at age 36, a few years after his retirement.
