= Danny Florencio =

Filipino basketball player (1947–2018)

Personal information
- Born: September 5, 1947 Quiapo, Manila, Philippines
- Died: February 25, 2018 (aged 70) Pittsburg, California, U.S.
- Listed height: 5 ft 10 in (1.78 m)
- Listed weight: 165 lb (75 kg)

Career information
- College: UST
- Drafted by: U-Tex Weavers
- Playing career: 1975–1983
- Position: Shooting guard / small forward
- Number: 8, 44, 22

Career history
- 1968–1969: YCO Painters
- 1970–1973: Crispa
- 1974–1976: U/Tex
- 1977: 7-Up
- 1978–1982: Toyota
- 1983: Galerie Dominique

Career highlights
- PBA Hall of Fame (2007); 50 Greatest Players in PBA History (2000 selection); Top 10: Scoring Average; Top 25: Free Throw Percentage; 2x Season Champion: Scoring Average; Season Champion: 2-Points Made
Medals
Men's basketball
Representing Philippines
ABC Championship
Gold medal – first place	1967 Seoul	Team
Bronze medal – third place	1969 Bangkok	Team
Silver medal – second place	1971 Tokyo	Team

Danilo Zoleta Florencio (September 5, 1947 – February 25, 2018) was a Filipino professional basketball player in the Philippine Basketball Association (PBA). He was known as "Daredevil Danny" and the original "Skywalker" in Philippine basketball.

== Amateur career ==
Florencio played for the UST Glowing Goldies from 1965–1967. After he left UST, joined the national team soon after, and became a member of the RP Team that finished second in the 1971 ABC Championships in Tokyo, which earned them a berth in the 1972 Munich Olympics. This was the last time the Philippine national basketball team qualified for the Olympics. He was also part of the national team that won gold in 1967 ABC Championship and earned the berth for the 1968 Summer Olympics in Mexico.

While donning the national team colors, he also played in the MICAA via the YCO Painters in the late 1960s, which was coached by no less than the great Caloy Loyzaga. In the early 1970s, he, along with Jun Papa, became the cornerstones of the powerhouse Crispa squad. However, in 1973, he, along with four others, were meted a lifetime ban by the MICAA due to game-fixing allegations, which was later lifted.

He was the hero of the Philippine team that beat South Korea in the 1967 FIBA Asia Championship, scoring the Philippines' last four points, including two clinching free throws for an 83-80 win.

== Professional career ==
Florencio played in the PBA from 1975 to 1983 with the U/Tex Wranglers, the Toyota Super Corollas, 7-Up, and the Galerie Dominique Artistas. Though generously listed as 5'10", he stood 5'9" at the most, but he distinguished himself with daring drives to the hoop capped by never-before-seen hangtime moves and twisting undergoal stabs. He also had an accurate jumpshot from up to 18 feet. His aerial feats earned him the nicknames "Daredevil Danny" and, decades after hanging up his sneakers, the "Original Skywalker", in reference to the more popular Samboy Lim, who admitted idolizing Florencio.

Florencio's eight seasons in the league were highlighted by numerous all-time records. In 1977, he averaged a 32.3 points per game in 39 games played, the highest tallied by any local player in a season. He was also the ninth player to achieve the 5,000 point-plateau, reaching the milestone on his birthday in 1981. He scored at least 50 points four times, at least 40 points six times, and at least 30 points eight times in his eight-year stint as a pro.

On November 5, 1977, he became the first local player in the PBA to score more than 60 points in a game. He tallied 64 points in an import-laden conference and led all locals in scoring that year. This was later broken by Allan Caidic.

At the end of his career, he ranked 11th in the all-time scoring plateau with 5,791 points, eighth in scoring average, and 13th all time in steals.

== Retirement and later life ==
Florencio would later be recognized as one of the PBA's Greatest Players in 2000 and was inducted into the PBA Hall of Fame in 2007. He moved to California after his retirement from basketball and permanently settled there. He occasionally returned to the Philippines after retiring from working several years in a hospital in San Francisco.

== Death ==
In Pittsburgh, California, he suffered a stroke and he died on February 25, 2018.
