= Domingo Itchon =

Filipino business executive

Domingo Yulo Itchon (1924–2004) was a Filipino business executive and best known as the second president of the Philippine Basketball Association (PBA). Itchon played a key role in organizing the PBA, Asia's first professional basketball league.

A cum laude from the University of the East (Business Administration), CPA board topnotcher and Harvard University graduate, he became the Elizalde Group of Companies' controller and was Don Manolo Elizalde's most trusted finance executive.

In 1962, Itchon was appointed team manager of the Elizalde-owned YCO Painters in the Manila Industrial and Commercial Athletic Association (MICAA), serving for over 20 years. Itchon was also MICAA president from 1971-1974. Itchon also became team manager of four Philippines men's national basketball teams. This includes the 1972 team that competed at the 1972 Summer Olympics, noted as the last time the Philippines has qualified for a basketball Olympiad.

In 1975, Itchon, Emerson Coseteng and Danny Floro hatched the idea of forming the PBA. He was elected as PBA's president from 1976 to 1982. Itchon also served as team manager of the Elizalde-owned Tanduay Rhum Masters.

Itchon was posthumously inducted into the PBA Hall of Fame on April 8, 2007.
