= 1978 PBA season =

- Duration: April 16 – December 14, 1978
- Teams: 8
- TV partner: GTV
- Season MVP: Robert Jaworski (Toyota Tamaraws)
- All-Filipino Conference champions: Toyota Tamaraws
- All-Filipino Conference runners-up: Filmanbank Bankers
- Open Conference champions: U/Tex Wranglers
- Open Conference runners-up: Crispa 400
- Invitational championship champions: Toyota Tamaraws
- Invitational championship runners-up: Tanduay Esquires

Seasons
- ← 1977 1979 →

The 1978 PBA season was the fourth season of the Philippine Basketball Association (PBA).

== Executive board ==
- Leopoldo L. Prieto (Commissioner)
- Domingo Y. Itchon (President, representing Elizalde & Co., Inc.)
- Dante Silverio (Vice President, representing Delta Motor Corporation)
- Walter Euyang (Treasurer, representing Universal Textile Mills, Inc.)

== Season highlights ==
- In a special pre-season event, a Crispa-PBA All-Star series was played, a five-game duel decided by cumulative scores which raked in more funds to the PBA players' trust fund. Crispa won three games but lost by 12 points in the cumulative scoring. On February 26, Crispa beat the PBA-All Stars, 99–90, for a 3–2 victory in a series played in Davao, Iloilo, Cebu and Manila. The All-Stars lineup were Robert Jaworski, Francis Arnaiz, Danny Florencio, Manny Paner, Ramon Fernandez, Rudolf Kutch, Abe King, Estoy Estrada, Jun Papa, Lim Eng Beng, Freddie Webb and Johnny Revilla. Their coach was Dante Silverio.
- Toyota Tamaraws wins the All-Filipino title and their fourth championship, winning in four games over newcomer Filmanbank, which reach the finals in their maiden year.
- In late September, the Toyota Tamaraws with imports Bruce "Sky" King and Carlos Terry, defeated the national teams of Yugoslavia and Canada in exhibition match prior to the World Basketball Championship held in Manila, an event Yugoslavia tops and saw Canada placing fifth.
- U/Tex became the first team to break the monopoly of titles by Toyota and Crispa by winning the Open Conference crown via 3–0 sweep over Crispa 400s. The Wranglers were coach by Tommy Manotoc and reinforced by Glenn McDonald and Byron "Snake" Jones.
- Toyota won their second title of the season by winning the invitational championship against Tanduay Esquires for their 5th PBA crown.

== Opening ceremonies ==
The muses for the participating teams are as follows:

Team	Muse
Crispa Redmanizers	Meg Paris
Filmanbank	Regina Prada
Great Taste Discoverers	Vilma Santos
Honda Wildcats	Maria Pilar Menendrez
Royal Tru-Orange	Mary Massab (Miss Magnolia)
Tanduay ESQ	Maja Bambi Arambulo (Binibining Pilipinas)
Toyota Tamaraws	Charo Santos and Dianne Jose
U/Tex Wranglers	Monette Arquiza

== Champions ==
- All Filipino Conference: Toyota Tamaraws
- Open Conference: U/Tex Wranglers
- Invitational championship: Toyota Tamaraws
- Team with best win–loss percentage: Toyota Tamaraws (40–15, .727)
- Best Team of the Year: Toyota Tamaraws (2nd)

== Individual awards ==
- Most Valuable Player: Robert Jaworski (Toyota)
- Rookie of the Year: Jimmy Manansala (Tanduay)
- Mythical Five:
  - Robert Jaworski (Toyota)
  - Lim Eng Beng (U/Tex)
  - Ramon Fernandez (Toyota)
  - Freddie Hubalde (Crispa)
  - Philip Cezar (Crispa)

== Cumulative standings ==
Team	GP	W	L	PCT
Toyota Tamaraws	55	40	15	.727
Crispa Redmanizers/400s	54	35	19	.648
U/Tex Wranglers	44	27	17	.614
Tanduay Esquires	55	24	31	.436
Royal Tru-Orange	28	12	16	.428
Filmanbank Bankers	42	16	26	.381
Honda Wildcats	28	8	20	.285
Great Taste Discoverers	28	5	23	.178

Elimination Round (All-Filipino Conference / Open Conference)
Team	W	L	PCT
Crispa	22	6	.786
Toyota	21	7	.750
U/Tex	17	11	.607
Tanduay	16	12	.571
Royal	12	16	.429
Filmanbank	11	17	.393
Honda	8	20	.285
Great Taste	5	23	.178
