= Glenn McDonald (basketball) =

American basketball player and coach (born 1952)

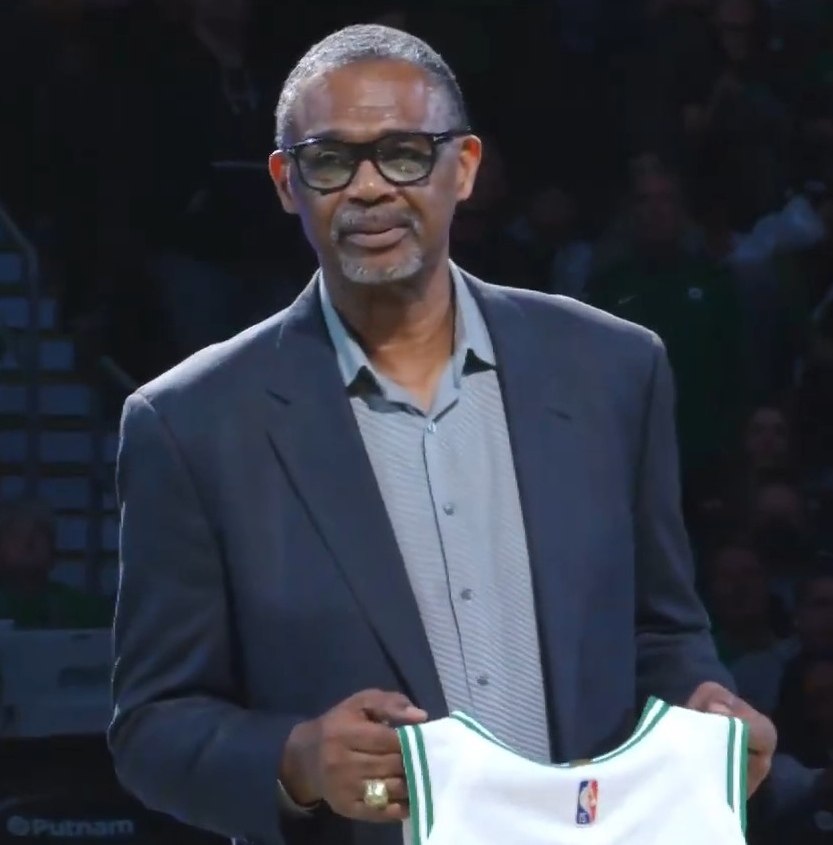
- McDonald in 2022

Personal information
- Born: March 21, 1952 (age 74) Kewanee, Illinois, U.S.
- Listed height: 6 ft 5 in (1.96 m)
- Listed weight: 190 lb (86 kg)

Career information
- High school: Jefferson (Los Angeles, California)
- College: Long Beach State (1971–1974)
- NBA draft: 1974: 1st round, 17th overall pick
- Drafted by: Boston Celtics
- Playing career: 1974–1980
- Position: Small forward / shooting guard
- Number: 30, 13

Career history

Playing
- 1974–1976: Boston Celtics
- 1976–1977: Milwaukee Bucks
- 1977–1978: Alviks BK
- 1978–1980: U/Tex Wranglers
- 1983: Sunkist Juice Lovers

Coaching
- 1981–1982: U/Tex Wranglers
- 1983: Sunkist Juice Lovers
- 2001–2002: Los Angeles Sparks (assistant)

Career highlights
- NBA champion (1976); PBA champion (1978 Open, 1980 Open)
- Stats at NBA.com
- Stats at Basketball Reference

Glenn McDonald (born March 18, 1952) is an American former professional basketball player. He played three seasons for the Boston Celtics and the Milwaukee Bucks before going overseas most notably in the Philippines, with the U/Tex Wranglers in the early-80's. He averaged 4.2 points in 146 games played in his NBA career.

== Professional career ==
He played a huge role in Game 5 of the 1976 NBA Finals, scoring eight points in the third overtime period as the Celtics won 128–126 before eventually winning the championship in six games.

After winning the title with Boston, McDonald was cut by the Celtics. He was later picked up by Don Nelson to play for the Milwaukee Bucks to replace an injured Fred Carter. McDonald was again cut after Carter was able to play. The forward tried out with the Phoenix Suns, yet ultimately wasn't signed. The sequence of events lead the American to pursue opportunities overseas and he ended up signing for Alvik BK in Sweden.

McDonald was then invited to come to the Philippines by a team owner in the PBA with a promise of good treatment for him and his family. Upon arrival, he immediately felt welcomed and then the invitation was parlayed to a stint in the Philippines. In the PBA, McDonald was instrumental in U/Tex's 1980 PBA Open Conference championship against Toyota Tamaraws. He scored two free-throws to send the fifth game into overtime after Toyota led by four with 16 seconds left in regulation. U/Tex eventually won the championship, 99–98. In 1981, he became the head coach of the U/Tex franchise after playing for the franchise for three consecutive seasons. He coached in the Philippines for two years, being a player-coach at one point. He has been introduced as the first NBA and PBA champion who has both played and coached in a national professional league.

McDonald went back to the United States after his coaching stint in the Philippines. Since he wanted to coach, his wife encouraged him to complete his degree to finish his degree as he had about a year left before leaving school for the NBA. He eventually completed his degree in sociology, and got involved with the men's basketball program at Long Beach State as a part-time assistant for two years.

McDonald transferred to Long Beach State's women's program as an assistant and later became its head coach for four years. He became an assistant coach under Michael Cooper for the Los Angeles Sparks of the WNBA, where they won two back-to-back championships. He was an advanced scout for the Utah Jazz for six years, and was the Director of Intramural Programs at Long Beach State.

== Personal life ==
McDonlad has been married to his wife for fifty years. In retirement, he still attends men's and women's games as a fan. From his time in the Philippines, he has maintained friendships with his former teammates and staff. He is friends with Tommy Manotoc and is a godfather to Matthew Manotoc, vice-governor of Ilocos Norte.

== Career statistics ==
Legend
GP	Games played	GS	Games started	MPG	Minutes per game
FG%	Field goal percentage	3P%	3-point field goal percentage	FT%	Free throw percentage
RPG	Rebounds per game	APG	Assists per game	SPG	Steals per game
BPG	Blocks per game	PPG	Points per game	**Bold**	Career high
†	Won an NBA championship

=== NBA ===
==== Regular season ====
Year	Team	GP	GS	MPG	FG%	3P%	FT%	RPG	APG	SPG	BPG	PPG
1974–75	Boston	62	-	6.4	.385	-	**.757**	1.1	0.4	0.1	0.1	2.7
1975–76†	Boston	**75**	-	**13.6**	**.419**	-	.714	**1.8**	**0.9**	**0.5**	**0.3**	**5.6**
1976–77	Milwaukee	9	-	8.8	.235	-	.750	1.3	0.8	0.4	0.0	2.1
Career		146	-	10.2	.400	-	.732	1.5	0.7	0.3	0.2	4.2

==== Playoffs ====
Year	Team	GP	GS	MPG	FG%	3P%	FT%	RPG	APG	SPG	BPG	PPG
1974–75	Boston	6	-	5.0	.167	-	.333	**1.0**	**0.3**	**0.2**	0.0	0.8
1975–76†	Boston	**13**	-	**5.2**	**.308**	-	**.833**	0.6	**0.3**	0.1	0.0	**1.6**
Career		19	-	5.2	.263	-	.667	0.7	0.3	0.1	0.0	1.4

=== PBA ===
Season	Team	GP	REB	PTS	PPG
1978	U-Tex	24	304	734	30.6
1979	U-Tex	27	288	825	30.6
1980	U-Tex	37	470	910	24.6
1983	Sunkist	2	35	58	29.0
Total		90	1,097	2,527	28.1
