= Lim Eng Beng =

Filipino basketball player

Lim Eng Beng 林嚶鳴 (Chinese)
Personal information
- Born: November 10, 1951 Tondo, Manila, Philippines
- Died: December 21, 2015 (aged 64) Manila, Philippines
- Listed height: 5 ft 11 in (1.80 m)
- Listed weight: 175 lb (79 kg)

Career information
- High school: Chiang Kai Shek College (Manila)
- College: De La Salle
- Playing career: 1975–1986
- Position: Guard
- Number: 14 and 17

Career history
- 1975-1976: Concepcion Carrier / Quasar
- 1976–1982: U/Tex Wranglers
- 1982–1983: San Miguel Beermen
- 1984: Crispa Redmanizers
- 1986: Manila Beer Brewmasters

Career highlights
- PBA Hall of Fame (2013); 50 Greatest Players in PBA History (2000 selection); PBA Awarded for Career 5,000 pts mark (1982); PBA Sportsmanship Award (1980); PBA Mythical Five (1978); PBA All-Star Mythical Five (1975); No. 14 jersey retired by De La Salle Green Archers; DLSU Sports Hall of Fame (1998)

Lim Eng Beng (Chinese: 林嚶鳴; November 10, 1951 – December 21, 2015) was a Filipino basketball player who spent twelve seasons in the Philippine Basketball Association (PBA) from 1975-1986.

== Early life ==
Lim was born and raised in Tondo, Manila from an impoverished family. When he was 5 or 6 years old, his family stayed in an informal settlement. It was around this time where the young Lim would use his passion in basketball as a means to climb out of hardship and support his family.

== Collegiate career ==
Lim played for the De La Salle Green Archers of "Man In White" Coach Valentin Eduque from 1971 to 1974 in the National Collegiate Athletic Association (Philippines). In his rookie year, the Green Archers, led by himself and Mike Bilbao, won the 1971 NCAA men's basketball championship which was De La Salle's first NCAA title in 15 years. Lim, who stood at 5'11 barefoot, was a deadly scorer that could single-handedly changed the complexion of a game. By the time he was a junior in 1973, he was getting various offers from several teams in the Manila Industrial and Commercial Athletic Association. However, Lim opted to stay for one more year upon the proddings of the late Br. Gabriel Connon FSC, the president of De La Salle College, promising that he would be getting something special in return. So for the final time, De La Salle's "Eagle Slayer", suited up for his beloved Green Archers. In his senior year, he averaged 32 points per outing in the 1974 season and set a single-game record for the most points (men's basketball), which is 55 - a record that stands to this day. He was adjudged the Most Popular NCAA Player, was cast into the Mythical Five, received the Sportsmanship Award, and ultimately won the Most Valuable Player (MVP) award. To cap his stellar collegiate career, he steered the Green Archers to the 1974 championship.

As a reward for winning the 1974 NCAA men's basketball championship, Br. Connon declared that his jersey number, 14, would be retired. In 1998, he was inducted into the DLSAA Sports Hall of Fame.

He claimed to have never missed a free throw during his college career.

== PBA career ==
Lim first played for Concepcion-Carrier Weathermakers (known as Quasar TV Makers in the following year) in the PBA's inaugural season.

He was traded to U/Tex Wranglers after the first conference of the 1976 season. As a wrangler, Lim won two PBA championships both in the Open Conference, first in 1978 and again in 1980 with Bogs Adornado as his teammate. After seven seasons with U/Tex from 1976-1982, Lim found himself being traded to San Miguel Beermen for Alex Tan prior to the start of the 1982 Third Conference.

Lim was the Beermen's top scorer in the first two conferences of the 1983 season. He moved to Crispa in his 10th year as a pro, getting an opportunity to play for the winningest ballclub and won a championship with the Redmanizers.

Retiring from the PBA in 1984 after 10 straight seasons, the former Green Archer return to action in the 1986 All-Filipino Conference with Manila Beer and played in all of their nine games. In his disappointing comeback with the Brewmasters, Lim could only sink a dismal eight-of-20 from the floor.

Lim was named as one of the PBA's Greatest Players and inducted into the PBA Hall of Fame in 2013.

=== Career highlights ===
- PBA Mythical Team (1978)
- Member, PBA 5,000 point club (1982)

== Post-PBA career ==
In 1988, Lim became player/coach of AGFA Color in the Philippine Basketball League (PBL) until 1990.

=== Chinese Filipino basketball leagues ===
Lim started playing for Chiang Kai Shek College in 1968. With the help of his elder brother, he was recruited to its high school varsity squad where he led the team three consecutive championships. His team often travelled to Taipei, Taiwan each year to play for an invitational basketball tournament, where his shooting skills earned him great reputation among the Taiwanese youth. During his senior year after leading his school team to the championships for the third consecutive year, he was awarded the Most Outstanding Varsity Player by the school principal.

He joined China Bank in Manila, in 1970, to play in the inter-bank tournament and won the championship trophy.

In 1975, when he started playing in the newly created PBA (Philippine Basketball Association), the Federation of Filipino-Chinese Chamber of Commerce quickly awarded him as one of the four Most Outstanding Youth in the Chinese Filipino community.

Playing continuously in professional basketball from 1975 to 1986, he was one of the few Chinese Filipino athletes in the Philippines to be recognized as a notable athlete.

In 1989, the Chiang Kai Shek Alumni Association awarded him a plaque of appreciation for the Most Outstanding Player representing the Philippines in International Tournaments. From 1990 to 1999, he played as playing coach for his Batch 31 basketball team.

From 1997 to 2001, he represented the PCFBL (Philippine Chinese Filipino Basketball League), as playing coach in the World Chinese Basketball Tournament and in the ASEAN Chinese Basketball League. Following are his and his team's accomplishments:

World Chinese Basketball Tournament:

Year 1997- 3rd placer held in Thailand Year 1998- 5th placer held in Beijing, China Year 1999- 2nd placer held in Malaysia Year 2000- Champions held in Sydney, Australia Year 2001- 3rd placer held in Thailand

ASEAN Chinese Basketball League:

Year 2000- Champions held in Thailand Year 2001- Champions held in Singapore Year 2002-2nd placer held in Indonesia

== Personal life ==
He married his wife Eleanor, a graduate of the Immaculate Conception Academy, in the late 1970s. His children have all gone to work for some of the largest conglomerates in the banking and telecommunication industries. Bryan (born 1981) works for RCBC, Erin (born 1988) is under BDO, and Ervin (born 1989) is stationed at Nokia.

In January 2013, Lim was diagnosed with Stage 3 liver cancer. On top of this, he was already suffering liver cirrhosis and was given three years to live.

== Death ==
Lim died on December 21, 2015, after a three-year battle against liver cancer.

Preceded by Freddie Hubalde	NCAA Seniors' Basketball Most Valuable Player; 1974	Succeeded by Alex Marquez
