= David Regullano =

Filipino basketball player

Career information
- College: Letran

Career history
- San Miguel
Medals
Men's basketball
Representing Philippines
ABC Championship
| Gold medal – first place | 1973 Manila | Team |

David Regullano is a former Filipino basketball player. He played for San Miguel in the Manila Industrial and Commercial Athletic Association. Regullano also appeared at the 1973 ABC Championship and 1974 FIBA World Championship as a member of the country's national basketball team. In the Philippine Basketball Association, he again suited up for his San Miguel team, then carrying the name Royal Tru-Orange, and later, with the U/tex Wranglers, where he won a championship in 1980 after beating the fabled Toyota Tamaraws in the Open Conference championship.

Regullano was well known among basketball fans for wearing old-school black high-top Chuck Taylors during games instead of the leather basketball sneakers that became popular in the 1970s and 1980s.
