= U/Tex Wranglers =

- Founded: 1975
- Withdrew: 1983
- History: U/Tex Weavers (1975–1976); U/Tex Wranglers (1976–1982)
- Team colors: Blue and yellow (1975–1979) Blue, yellow and red (1977–1978) Black and gold (1980) Blue, yellow, gray and white (1981–1982)
- Company: Universal Textile Mills, Inc.
- Head coaches: Caloy Loyzaga; Napoleon Flores; Narciso Bernardo; Tommy Manotoc; Glenn McDonald
- Ownership: Walter Euyang
- Championships: 2 championships 1978 Open; 1980 Open 4 Finals Appearances
Light uniform	Dark uniform

The U/Tex Wranglers were a professional basketball team and one of the pioneers of the Philippine Basketball Association (PBA) in its maiden season in 1975.

== History ==
Universal Textile Mills, Inc., a company owned by Patricio Luis "P. L." Lim and Walter Euyang, formed the U-Tex Spinners in 1960, playing in the Businessman Athletic Association (BAA), a minor league. It transferred to the MICAA in 1961.

By the 1970s, the team was competing in the MICAA as the U/Tex Weavers. They were bannered by the likes of Lawrence "Larry" Mumar, Danny Basilan and Lucio Lim. Others who donned the Weavers jersey were Francis Arnaiz, Jumbo Salvador, Roehl Nadurata, Clemente Bargas, Orly de los Santos and Domingo Celis.

The Weavers were led by Freddie Hubalde, Danny Basilan, and Ricky Pineda when they won the 1973 Dona Edralin Marcos Cup held at the Loyola Center. The Weavers' four-overtime win over Manilabank was a forgotten classic mainly because of the absence of stars who were preparing for the 1973 ABC Championship and unavailable for their mother teams. Others in the Weavers championship team were former college standouts Jess Sta. Maria, Virgilio "Bong" de la Cruz, Roehl Deles and Romeo Frank.

The team had its big break in 1974 when BAP President Gonzalo "Lito" Puyat pardoned players previously banned for game-fixing and awarded former Crispa players Danilo Florencio and Rudolf Kutch to U/Tex. Both players debuted with U/Tex during the 1974 National Seniors against MLQU. Overall, they finished 2nd next to champion YCO Painters by virtue of tie-breaking rules as a muffed free throw by Redmanizers' Philip Cezar gave them a win over Crispa.

=== 1974 MICAA playoff controversy ===
In the MICAA All-Filipino tournament in 1974, the Weavers nosed out defending champion Toyota Comets in a playoff game on October 8, a heart-stopping 74–73 victory on an undergoal shot by Danny Florencio at the buzzer from a long pitch by Rudolf Kutch, and made it to their first-ever MICAA finals series against first finalist Crispa Redmanizers.

The Toyota Comets placed the game under protest and the MICAA board ordered a replay of their rubbermatch. MICAA president Emerson Coseteng, upon the meeting with the officials, which included the timekeeper, the referees and three U/Tex representatives, found out in the stop watches that 20.5 seconds had already elapsed before Florencio could release the ball. Counter-checking, it was observed that 21 seconds was consumed when Florencio released the ball from the time he had put in his two free throws off Cristino Reynoso with 20 ticks to go and Toyota still up by one at 73–72.

The replay was set on October 12, 1974, but a U/Tex spokesperson said the Weavers wouldn't show up in the game. As such, U/Tex defaulted the rematch. The following day, the MICAA board announced the best-of-three title series would be between Crispa and Toyota. The Basketball Association of the Philippines (BAP) decided to act on the appeal of U/Tex, which actually requested a postponement of the replay, but was denied.

=== PBA season (first two seasons, 1975-1976) ===
As one of the founding members of Asia's first play-for-pay league, U/Tex was often hailed as the third best team behind Crispa and Toyota during the 1970s. They finished third place in the first and third conferences of the league's inaugural season. The Weavers were involved in the first-ever PBA playoff game in the first conference, losing to Crispa for the right to meet Toyota in the championship. Their lineup aside from Danny Florencio and Rudolf Kutch were consist of Danny Basilan, Roehl Deles, Romeo Frank, Larry Mumar, Jaime Otazu and Ricky Pineda.

In 1976, now known as U/Tex Wranglers, the team finished in the top four in the second and third conferences. The Wranglers acquired Lim Eng Beng, Jaime Noblezada, Romualdo Cabading and Roy Deles from the soon-to-be defunct ballclub Quasar TV Makers in the second conference.

=== Finals stint and first PBA championship ===
The year 1977 saw Tommy Manotoc, a two-time former national golf champion, taking over the U/Tex coaching chores from Narciso Bernardo at the beginning of the second conference. The Wranglers were earlier involved in the league's first-ever trade where they shipped Danny Florencio and Jaime Otazu to 7-Up Uncolas for veterans Carlos Rodriguez and Cristino Reynoso. They finally had a breakthrough when the Wranglers became the second team after Mariwasa-Honda to break the Crispa-Toyota monopoly in the PBA Finals. U/Tex lost to Crispa in the Open Conference finals in five games, the Redmanizers had only Cyrus Mann as their import since his partner, Ricky Hicks, have long left. Mann went up against the Wranglers' imports Charlie Neal and Byron "Snake" Jones.

In 1978, U/Tex bolster its lineup with the acquisition of rookies Anthony Dasalla and Renato Lobo, both from FEU Tamaraws. The Wranglers finally won their first title in the second conference – the first for a team not named either Crispa or Toyota. It was a sweet championship victory for U/Tex over Crispa, scoring a 3–0 sweep and avenged their loss to the same Redmanizers in the previous Open conference, this time, the Wranglers were powered by the pair of Bryon "Snake" Jones and former Boston Celtic Glenn McDonald. Their top local player Lim Eng Beng made it to the year's best Mythical first team.

=== 2nd PBA title in 1980 ===
After a not-so-good 1979 season for U/Tex where at the start of the year, they lost some key players to other teams like Rudolf Kutch, who moved over to Filmanbank. The Wranglers came back in 1980 and in the Open Conference, their import Glenn McDonald returns anew and this time, he will be teaming up alongside the 6'8" Aaron James, another legitimate NBA veteran who played with the New Orleans Jazz. The Wranglers makes a return trip to the PBA finals. Earlier in the conference, they traded for Bogs Adornado in exchange for P 100,000 with Crispa. Manotoc and Andy Jao (then the team's assistant manager and assistant coach) were more than happy to accommodate the two-time MVP although a lot of experts were skeptical of Adornado's capability to come back in his old form. By that time, U/Tex's motley set of local players included, apart from Adornado and Lim Eng Beng, brothers Ricky and Mollet Pineda, Jimmy Noblezada, Fritz Gaston, Ompong Segura and David Regullano. The Wranglers lost Anthony Dasalla and Renato Lobo to Galleon Shippers via free agency and signed former Toyota players Gil Cortez, Oscar Rocha and 1977 PBA rookie of the year Jaime Taguines to fill their shoes.

Two major incidents happened in the 1980 Open Conference finals against Toyota Tamaraws. The first one was the famous quote of Coach Tommy Manotoc after Game four of the championship series. In that game, with less than seven minutes left and the Tamaraws ahead by 11 points (U/Tex was ahead in the best of five series, 2–1), Manotoc pulled out all his starters including the two imports in an apparent sign of surrender. After the game, when asked by reporters why he gave up with so much time remaining, Manotoc quipped, "one step back, two steps forward", referring to his tactic of reserving his players' energy in preparation for sudden death Game five. Manotoc was severely criticized for this and to the point that reporters were suggesting to then Commissioner Leo Prieto to sanction him. But two days after, Manotoc justified his actions when Game five went into overtime. This is when the second incident happened. Prior to the overtime, the Tamaraws were ahead by four points with 16 seconds left. The Wranglers overhauled a four-point deficit and sent the game into overtime, winning by one point, 99–98. Coach Tommy Manotoc just gave the Walter Euyang franchise its second title in three years. Bogs Adornado cracked the Mythical five for the third time in his PBA career.

=== Last two seasons (1981-1982) ===
Coach Tommy Manotoc left the team to join the San Miguel Beermen as their new mentor beginning the 1981 PBA season, replacing him on the U/Tex bench is their former import Glenn McDonald. The Wranglers made it to the Reinforced Filipino Conference championship, the second and final conference of the season as they played the Crispa Redmanizers in the finals for the third time in five years. U/Tex had 6'3" Leroy Jackson as their import pitted against 6'1" Al Green and they lost to the Redmanizers in four games. As a Wrangler, William 'Bogs' Adornado won his third Most Valuable Player (MVP) award at the end of the season.

In 1982, the Wranglers released some of its veterans from the lineup during the off-season, among them were Roy Deles, the Pineda brothers Ricky and Molet, Danny Pribhdas and David Regullano. The team signed rookies Steve Watson and Carlson Samlani and acquired Gary Vargas from the disbanded CDCP ballclub, along with Evalson Valencia from San Miguel, Bong dela Cruz and Tito Varela from Crispa.

U/Tex enlisted the services of Julius Wayne as their import in the First Conference and the team had their last best finish, upsetting the Lew Massey-powered Gilbey's Gin in the best-of-three quarterfinal series but lost to San Miguel Beermen in four games in the best-of-five semifinal series. Before the start of the Third Conference, Lim Eng Beng was traded and reunited with coach Tommy Manotoc at San Miguel, the Wranglers got Alex Tan from the Beermen in return. U/tex placed sixth in their final PBA conference.

Universal Textile Mills Inc. was brought down by the economic crisis (Dewey Dee, PhilFinance) that befell the country. The team disbanded at the end of the 1982 PBA season and their players were spread out to different teams in the following season with Bogs Adornado going to Great Taste, Fritz Gaston and Carlson Samlani joining San Miguel, and Gary Vargas and Steve Watson to Gilbey's Gin.

== Season-by-season records ==
Legend
Champion

Runner-up

Third place

Season	Conference	Team name	Overall record			Finals
Season	Conference	Team name	W	L	%	Finals
1975	First Conference	U/Tex Weavers	26	23	.531	
1975	Second Conference	U/Tex Weavers	26	23	.531	
1975	All-Philippine	U/Tex Weavers	26	23	.531	
1976	First Conference	U/Tex Weavers	27	23	.540	
1976	Second Conference	U/Tex Weavers	27	23	.540	
1976	All-Philippine	U/Tex Weavers	27	23	.540	
1977	All-Filipino Conference	U/Tex Wranglers	27	23	.540	
1977	Open Conference	U/Tex Wranglers	27	23	.540	Crispa 3, U/Tex 2
1977	Invitational championship	U/Tex Wranglers	27	23	.540	
1978	All-Filipino Conference	U/Tex Wranglers	27	17	.614	
1978	Open Conference	U/Tex Wranglers	27	17	.614	U/Tex 3, Crispa 0
1978	Invitational championship	U/Tex Wranglers	27	17	.614	
1979	All-Filipino Conference	U/Tex Wranglers	23	21	.523	
1979	Open Conference	U/Tex Wranglers	23	21	.523	
1979	Invitational championship	U/Tex Wranglers	23	21	.523	
1980	Open Conference	U/Tex Wranglers	24	28	.462	U/Tex 3, Toyota 2
1980	Invitational championship	U/Tex Wranglers	24	28	.462	
1980	All-Filipino Conference	U/Tex Wranglers	24	28	.462	
1981	Open Conference	U/Tex Wranglers	34	19	.642	
1981	Reinforced Filipino Conference	U/Tex Wranglers	34	19	.642	Crispa 3, U/Tex 1
1982	Reinforced Filipino Conference	U/Tex Wranglers	22	33	.400	
1982	Invitational championship	U/Tex Wranglers	22	33	.400	
1982	Open Conference	U/Tex Wranglers	22	33	.400	
Overall record			213	184	.537	2 championships

== Notable players ==
In alphabetical order. Members of PBA Hall of Fame and PBA's Greatest Players are in boldface.

- **William "Bogs" Adornado** #33
- **Danny Florencio** #8
- **Lim Eng Beng** #14 & #24
- Virgilio "Billy" Abarrientos #9
- Armando Arce #18
- Danny Basilan #14
- Romualdo Cabading #12
- Edward Camus #15
- Aurelio "Boy" Clariño #23
- Gil Cortez #13 & #16
- Benjamin Chua #4
- Anthony Dasalla #9
- Virgilio "Bong" dela Cruz #12
- Roehl Deles #12
- Roy Deles #5
- Orly delos Santos #10
- Gregorio Dionisio #30
- Romeo Frank #15 & #25
- Fritz Gaston #10 & #22
- Edgardo Gomez #17
- Rudy Hines #11
- Rudolf Kutch #13
- George Lizares #11 & #5
- Renato Lobo #7
- Jesusito Martin #10
- Alfonso Mora #11
- Larry Mumar #7
- Jimmy Noblezada #19 & #8
- Albert Ortiz #21 & #6
- Jaime Otazu #18
- Rey Pages #12
- Ricky Pineda #9 & #6
- Molet Pineda #7
- Danny Pribhdas #13
- David Regullano #17
- Cristino Reynoso #18
- Oscar Rocha #13
- Carlos Rodriguez #19
- Carlson Samlani #7
- Ompong Segura #18 & #15
- Jaime Taguines #9
- Alex Tan #5
- Marty Tierra #50
- Evalson Valencia #17
- Arturo Valenzona #21
- Tito Varela #13
- Gary Vargas #11
- Roberto Victorino #19
- Steve Watson #44

== Imports ==
- Charles Walker #30 (1975)
- Mike Truell #23 (1975)
- Lee Haven #25 #22 (1975–1976)
- Dan Knight #1(1976)
- Charlie Neal #30 (1977)
- Byron "Snake" Jones #33 (1977–1978)
- Henry Williams (1978)
- James Robinson #21(1979)
- George Q. Trapp #19 (1979)
- Glenn McDonald #20 (1978–1980)
- Aaron James #23 (1980)
- Darrell Allums #32 (1981)
- Francois Wise #6 #8 (1981–82)
- John Kazmer #34 (1981)
- Leroy Jackson #4 (1981–82)
- Julius Wayne #8 (1982)
- Ira Terrell #32 (1982)
- Leo Cunningham #32 (1982)

Preceded by (start)	PBA teams genealogies 1975–82	Succeeded by Manhattan
