= 1980 PBA season =

Sixth PBA season

- Duration: March 16 – December 13, 1980
- Teams: 10
- TV partner: GTV/MBS
- Season MVP: Philip Cezar (Crispa Redmanizers)
- Open Conference champions: U/Tex Wranglers
- Open Conference runners-up: Toyota Tamaraws
- Invitational championship champions: Nicholas Stoodley (USA)
- Invitational championship runners-up: Toyota Tamaraws
- All-Filipino Conference champions: Crispa Redmanizers
- All-Filipino Conference runners-up: Toyota Tamaraws

Seasons
- ← 1979 1981 →

The 1980 PBA season was the sixth season of the Philippine Basketball Association (PBA).

== Season highlights ==
- The three-point field goal was introduced at the start of the year.
- From July 3 to 7, two PBA selections hosted the visiting Golden State Warriors in a series of exhibition games. Their four-game series ends in a tie with two wins apiece.
- The U/tex Wranglers wins the Open Conference title by beating Toyota in overtime, 99–98 in the deciding fifth game, best remembered for the famous "Last 16 seconds" when coach Tommy Manotoc's team wiped out a four-point deficit with 16 seconds left in regulation and winning in the extension period.
- Nicholas Stoodley/USA wins the Invitational championship with a two-game sweep over Toyota Tamaraws to become the first foreign team to capture a PBA title.
- The season-ending tournament marked the Crispa Redmanizers' incredible 20–1 record in the All-Filipino Conference, winning their first 19 games and almost completed a conference sweep, if not for Toyota's victory in Game 3 of the finals, which saw the dismissal of their head coach Fort Acuña.

== Opening ceremonies ==
The muses for the participating teams are as follows:

Team	Muse
Galleon Shippers	
Gilbey's Gin	
Great Taste Discoverers	
Honda Hagibis	Leah Navarro
Royal Tru-Orange	Dina Bonnevie
Tanduay Esquires	Gina Aragon and Zalda Aragon
Tefilin Fibermakers	Charo Santos
Toyota Tamaraws	Anna Menendrez
U/Tex Wranglers	Alma Moreno
Walk Tall Jeansmakers	Vilma Santos

== Champions ==
- Open Conference: U/Tex Wranglers
- Invitational championship: Nicholas Stoodley USA
- All-Filipino Conference: Crispa Redmanizers
- Team with best win–loss percentage: Crispa Redmanizers (44–15, .746)
- Best Team of the Year: Crispa Redmanizers (3rd)

== Individual awards ==
- Most Valuable Player: Philip Cezar (Crispa)
- Rookie of the Year: Willie Generalao (Gilbey's Gin)
- Mythical Five:
  - Robert Jaworski (Toyota)
  - Atoy Co (Crispa)
  - Ramon Fernandez (Toyota)
  - Bogs Adornado (U/Tex)
  - Philip Cezar (Crispa)

== Cumulative standings ==
Team	GP	W	L	PCT
Walk Tall Jeansmakers / Crispa Redmanizers	59	44	15	.746
Nicholas Stoodley/USA	10	7	3	.700
Adidas/France	10	7	3	.700
Toyota Tamaraws	61	40	21	.656
Galleon Shippers	30	16	14	.533
Tefilin Fibermakers	30	14	16	.467
U/Tex Wranglers	52	24	28	.461
Tanduay Esquires	39	16	23	.410
Gilbey's Gin	39	16	23	.410
Great Taste Discoverers / Presto Fun Drinks	39	14	25	.359
Honda Hagibis	31	9	22	.290
Royal Tru-Orange / San Miguel Beermen	32	9	23	.281

Elimination Round (Open Conference/All-Filipino Conference)
Team	W	L	PCT
Toyota	22	5	.815
Crispa/Walk Tall	21	6	.778
U/Tex	15	12	.556
Great Taste/Presto	13	14	.482
Galleon	13	14	.482
Tefilin	12	15	.444
Gilbey's Gin	12	15	.444
Honda	9	18	.333
Tanduay	9	18	.333
Royal	9	18	.333
