= Freddie Hubalde =

Filipino basketball player

Personal information
- Born: September 14, 1953 (age 73)
- Listed height: 6 ft 1 in (1.85 m)
- Listed weight: 175 lb (79 kg)

Career information
- College: Mapúa
- PBA draft: 1975 Elevated
- Drafted by: Crispa Redmanizers
- Playing career: 1975–1990
- Position: Small forward / shooting guard
- Number: 10

Career history
- 1974: U/Tex Weavers
- 1975–1984: Crispa Redmanizers
- 1985–1987: Tanduay Rhum Makers
- 1988: Purefoods Hotdogs
- 1988–1989: Formula Shell
- 1990: Añejo Rhum 65

Career highlights
- 16× PBA champion; 2× Grand Slam champion (1976, 1983); PBA Most Valuable Player (1977); 3× PBA Mythical First Team (1977, 1978, 1986); 50 Greatest Players in PBA History (2000 selection)

Alfredo Hubalde (born September 14, 1953), also known as Freddie Hubalde, is a retired Filipino professional basketball player in the PBA.

== Collegiate career ==
Hubalde played college ball for the Mapúa Institute of Technology, before eventually moving on to play professional basketball in the PBA. He also has the distinction of being one of the few NCAA high school players playing for the senior team during his stay with Mapua.

== Professional career ==
Hubalde started his PBA career with the Crispa Redmanizers, and was part of two Crispa grand slam teams in 1976 and 1983. He was a low key but reliable offensive player who could turn the game around with his deadly shooting both from the perimeter and, in his later years, from three-point range. He became famous for his off-the-glass jumpers and tight undergoal stabs ("dukot"). On defense, he utilized his patented "back tap" when stripping the player he is guarding of possession.

In 1977, he was the awarded as the league's season Most Valuable Player.

When Crispa folded at the end of the 1984 season, he and Crispa teammate Abet Guidaben moved to Tanduay and instantly transformed the team into a playoff contender. Before the start of the 1985 Third Conference, Guidaben was traded to Manila Beer in exchange for Ramon Fernandez, thus ushering a bright new era for the team still in search of a championship. In the 1986 Reinforced (First) Conference, Tanduay, now led by himself and Fernandez with supporting casts point guard Willie Generalao, forwards Jayvee Yango and Padim Israel and imports Rob Williams and Andre McKoy, finally won its first ever PBA title. With his steady play and clutch shooting, he led Tanduay to its second title the following conference, capturing the All-Filipino championship at the expense of Robert Jaworski and Ginebra San Miguel. In the title-clinching game, he sank two free throws off a Jaworski foul in the waning seconds to win the game for Tanduay. Tanduay would fail in its bid for a grand slam as Ginebra easily won the Open (Third) Conference, thanks to its devastating import combination in Billy Ray Bates and Michael Hackett. The Rhum Makers, however, would bounce back the following year as they dominated the 1987 Open (First) Conference with former Celtic David Thirdkill as import en route to their third championship in the last four conferences. This would be his 16th and last championship (He won 13 with Crispa) in the PBA, making him the second winningest behind Fernandez's 19.

In 2000, he was named a member of the PBA's 25 Greatest Players.

== Personal life ==
Hubalde is the father of basketball players Frederick "Derrick" Hubalde and Paolo Hubalde.
