= Lists of Philippine Basketball Association imports =

This Philippine Basketball Association (PBA) page is used for splitting purposes to prevent this list from becoming too large. The following list articles have been created for easier navigation among all-time PBA imports, or players who are considered as foreigners in the league.

- List of Philippine Basketball Association imports (A–E)
- List of Philippine Basketball Association imports (F–J)
- List of Philippine Basketball Association imports (K–O)
- List of Philippine Basketball Association imports (P–T)
- List of Philippine Basketball Association imports (U–Z)

== See also ==
- List of Philippine Basketball Association players
