= 1982 U-Tex Wranglers season =

- Head coach: Glenn McDonald
- Owner: Universal Textile Mills

Reinforced All-Filipino Conference results
- Record: 13–17 (43.3%)
- Place: 4th
- Playoff finish: Semifinals

Invitational Conference results
- Record: 0–4 (0%)
- Place: 5th
- Playoff finish: N/A

Open Conference results
- Record: 9–12 (42.9%)
- Place: 6th
- Playoff finish: Quarterfinals

U-Tex Wranglers seasons

The 1982 U/Tex Wranglers season was the 8th and final season of the franchise in the Philippine Basketball Association (PBA).

== Transactions ==
Players Added	Signed	Former team
Virgilio dela Cruz	Off-season	Crispa
Tito Varela	Off-season	Crispa
Evalson Valencia	Off-season	San Miguel Beer
Gary Vargas	Off-season	CDCP (disbanded)
Gerry Samlani ^{Rookie}	Off-season	N/A
Steve Watson ^{Rookie}	Off-season	N/A

== Summary ==
The Wranglers had Julius Wayne, a seventh-round draft pick by the Portland Trail Blazers in the 1981 NBA draft, as their import for the Reinforced Filipino Conference. U/Tex finish the elimination phase with an 8-10 won-loss card. The Wranglers scored an upset 2–0 sweep off Gilbey's Gin in the best-of-three quarterfinals. They lost to top-seeded San Miguel Beermen in four games in the best-of-five semifinal series. Wayne return to play four more games in the Second Conference Asian Invitationals where U/Tex failed to score a single victory.

Coach Glenn McDonald opted for Leroy Jackson, who led the Wranglers to the finals last season, and Ira Terrell, a former Tefilin import, as their two reinforcements in the Open Conference. After 11 games in the elimination phase, Terrell was replaced by Leo Cunningham, who played only two games before another U/Tex returnee Francois Wise came in to replace Cunningham and teamed up with Jackson for the rest of the conference. U/Tex were tied with three other teams going into the last scheduled quarterfinal matches. The Wranglers lost to San Miguel, 112–118 on November 23, in what turn out to be their final game. The Walter Euyang ballclub would disband its franchise the following season.

== Won-loss records vs Opponents ==
Team	Win	Loss	1st (Reinforced)	2nd (Invitational)	3rd (Open)
Crispa Redmanizers	3	9	2-6	0-1	1–2
Mariwasa-Honda / Galerie Dominique	4	2	1-2	N/A	3–0
Gilbey's Gin	3	3	2-2	N/A	1-1
Great Taste / N-Rich Coffee	3	2	3-0	N/A	0–2
San Miguel Beermen	4	8	3-4	0-1	1–3
Toyota Super Corollas	3	4	1-2	0-1	2–1
YCO-Tanduay	2	4	1-1	N/A	1–3
Korea (Guest squad)	0	1	N/A	0-1	N/A
Total	22	33	13-17	0-4	9-12

== Roster ==
U-Tex Wranglers roster
Players
Coaches

Pos.	No.	Nat.	Name	Ht.	Wt.
G	5	(Philippines)	Alex Tan	6 ft 1 in (1.85 m)		UE
G	6	(Philippines)	Albert Ortiz	6 ft 0 in (1.83 m)		Philippines
F/C	7	(Philippines)	Carlson Samlani	6 ft 4 in (1.93 m)		San Sebastian
F/C	9	(Philippines)	Jaime Taguines	6 ft 3 in (1.91 m)		Holy Angel
F/C	10	(Philippines)	Jesusito Martin	6 ft 3 in (1.91 m)		José Rizal
F	11	(Philippines)	Gary Vargas	6 ft 2 in (1.88 m)		PSBA
G	12	(Philippines)	Virgilio Dela Cruz	6 ft 3 in (1.91 m)		Mapúa
G	13	(Philippines)	Tito Varela	6 ft 1 in (1.85 m)		UE
F	17	(Philippines)	Evalson Valencia	6 ft 1 in (1.85 m)		Western Institute
F/C	18	(Philippines)	Armando Arce	6 ft 3 in (1.91 m)
G	22	(Philippines)	Matthew Gaston	6 ft 1 in (1.85 m)		Ateneo
G	30	(Philippines)	Gregorio Dionisio	5 ft 10 in (1.78 m)		Adamson
G/F	33	(Philippines)	Bogs Adornado	6 ft 1 in (1.85 m)		UST
F	44	(Philippines)	Steve Watson	6 ft 2 in (1.88 m)		Ateneo
G	50	(Philippines)	Marty Tierra	5 ft 11 in (1.80 m)		José Rizal
G/F	8	(United States)	Julius Wayne (I)	6 ft 1 in (1.85 m)		UTEP
G	4	(United States)	Leroy Jackson (I)	6 ft 3 in (1.91 m)		Cameron
F/C	32	(United States)	Ira Terrell (I)	6 ft 8 in (2.03 m)		SMU
F/C	32	(United States)	Leo Cunningham (I)	6 ft 7 in (2.01 m)		Utah State
F	8	(United States)	Francois Wise (I)	6 ft 4 in (1.93 m)		Long Beach State

Head coach

- (United States) Glenn McDonald

Assistant coach(es)

Legend

- (C) Team captain
- (I) Import
- Injured

=== Trades ===
August 1982	To San Miguel Beermen Lim Eng Beng	To U-Tex Wranglers Alex Tan

=== Additions ===
Player	Signed	Former team
Gregorio Dionisio	August 1982	Crispa
Marty Tierra	August 1982	Tefilin (disbanded)
