= 1981 PBA season =

Seventh PBA season

- Duration: March 8 – November 28, 1981
- Teams: 10
- TV partner: MBS
- Season MVP: Bogs Adornado (U/Tex Wranglers)
- Open Conference champions: Toyota Super Diesels
- Open Conference runners-up: Crispa Redmanizers
- Reinforced Filipino Conference champions: Crispa Redmanizers
- Reinforced Filipino Conference runners-up: U/Tex Wranglers

Seasons
- ← 1980 1982 →

The 1981 PBA season was the seventh season of the Philippine Basketball Association (PBA).

== Board of governors ==
=== Executive committee ===
- Leopoldo L. Prieto (Commissioner)
- Domingo Y. Itchon (President, representing YCO-Tanduay)

=== Teams ===
Team	Company	Governor
Crispa Redmanizers	P. Floro and Sons	Virgilio A. Dalupan
CDCP Road Builders	Construction Development Corporation of the Philippines	Roberto S. Cuenca
Finance Funders	Finance Inc.	Emerson Coseteng
Gilbey's Gin Tonics/St. George Whiskies	La Tondeña Incorporada	Carlos Palanca III
Great Taste Coffee Makers	Consolidated Foods Corporation	Porfirio G. Zablan
San Miguel Beermen	San Miguel Corporation	Leonardo M. Guinto
Tefilin Polyesters	Filipinas Synthetic Fiber Corporation	Frank R. Ham
Toyota Super Corollas	Delta Motor Corporation	Ricardo C. Silverio, Jr.
YCO-Tanduay	Elizalde & Company; Tanduay Distillers, Inc.	Domingo Y. Itchon
U/Tex Wranglers	Universal Textile Mills	Walter Euyang
	Canlubang Sugar Estate	Harold Hoffman

== Season highlights ==
- Instead of the usual three-conference format, the season was shortened to two conferences to give way for the Philippines' hosting of the SEA Games in Manila.
- Rivals Toyota and Crispa played in the finals for the 10th and what turn out to be the last time during the PBA Open Conference championship series. The Super Diesels finally ended a string of three runner-up finishes from last year by winning against the Redmanizers in five games.
- Toyota import Andrew Fields became the first recipient of the PBA Best Import Award.
- William "Bogs" Adornado of U/Tex Wranglers won his 3rd Most Valuable Player Award.

== Champions ==
- Open Conference: Toyota Super Diesels
- Reinforced Filipino Conference: Crispa Redmanizers
- Team with best win–loss percentage: Toyota Super Diesels (29–14, .674)
- Best Team of the Year: Crispa Redmanizers (4th)

== Open Conference ==
=== Elimination round ===
Pos	Team	W	L	PCT	GB	Qualification
1	San Miguel Beermen	14	4	.778	—	Semifinal round
2	U-Tex Wranglers	14	4	.778	—	Semifinal round
3	Crispa Redmanizers	13	5	.722	1	Semifinal round
4	Toyota Super Diesels	12	6	.667	2	Semifinal round
5	Tefilin Polyesters	10	8	.556	4	
6	CDCP Road Builders	10	8	.556	4	
7	Gilbey's Gin	7	11	.389	7	
8	Finance Funders	5	13	.278	9	
9	Presto Fun Drinks	4	14	.222	10	
10	YCO-Tanduay	1	17	.056	13	

=== Semifinal round ===
Pos	Team	W	L	PCT	GB	Qualification
1	Toyota Super Diesels	5	1	.833	—	Advance to the Finals
2	Crispa Redmanizers	4	2	.667	1	Advance to the Finals
3	U-Tex Wranglers	2	4	.333	3	Proceed to third place playoff
4	San Miguel Beermen	1	5	.167	4	Proceed to third place playoff

=== Finals ===
Team 1	Series	Team 2	Game 1	Game 2	Game 3	Game 4	Game 5
(1) Toyota Super Diesels	3–2	(2) Crispa Redmanizers	123–116	124–126	116–126	116–98	103–97

- Best Import of the Conference: Andrew Fields (Toyota)

== Reinforced Filipino Conference ==
=== Elimination round ===
Pos	Team	W	L	PCT	GB	Qualification
1	Crispa Redmanizers	7	2	.778	—	Quarterfinal round
2	Toyota Super Diesels	7	2	.778	—	Quarterfinal round
3	U-Tex Wranglers	6	3	.667	1	Quarterfinal round
4	Presto Fun Drinks	5	4	.556	2	Quarterfinal round
5	YCO-Tanduay	5	4	.556	2	Quarterfinal round
6	Tefilin Polyesters	5	4	.556	2	Quarterfinal round
7	CDCP Road Builders	4	5	.444	3	
8	Finance Funders	3	6	.333	4	
9	San Miguel Beermen	2	7	.222	5	
10	St. George Whiskies	1	8	.111	6	

=== Quarterfinal round ===
Pos	Team	W	L	PCT	GB	Qualification
1	U-Tex Wranglers	4	1	.800	—	Semifinal round
2	Crispa Redmanizers	3	2	.600	1	Semifinal round
3	YCO-Tanduay	3	2	.600	1	Semifinal round
4	Presto Fun Drinks	3	2	.600	1	Semifinal round
5	Toyota Super Diesels	2	3	.400	2	
6	Tefilin Polyesters	0	5	.000	4	

=== Semifinal round ===
Pos	Team	W	L	PCT	GB	Qualification
1	U-Tex Wranglers	4	2	.667	—	Advance to the finals
2	Crispa Redmanizers	3	3	.500 (Note: Second seed playoff: Crispa 119–114 Presto)	1	Advance to the finals
3	Presto Fun Drinks	3	3	.500	1	Proceed to third-place playoff
4	YCO-Tanduay	2	4	.333	2	Proceed to third-place playoff

=== Finals ===
Team 1	Series	Team 2	Game 1	Game 2	Game 3	Game 4	Game 5
(1) U-Tex Wranglers	1–3	(2) Crispa Redmanizers	108–113	95–91	112–116	119–124	—

- Best Import of the Conference: Russell Murray (Tanduay)

== Awards ==
- Most Valuable Player: Bogs Adornado (U/Tex)
- Rookie of the Year: Rafael Sison (Presto)
- Best Import-Open Conference: Andrew Fields (Toyota)
- Best Import-Reinforced Conference: Russell Murray (Yco-Tanduay)
- Mythical Five:
  - Robert Jaworski (Toyota)
  - Atoy Co (Crispa)
  - Ramon Fernandez (Toyota)
  - Bogs Adornado (U/Tex)
  - Philip Cezar (Crispa)

== Cumulative standings ==
Team	GP	W	L	PCT
Toyota Super Diesels	43	29	14	.674
Crispa Redmanizers	54	36	18	.667
U/Tex Wranglers	53	34	19	.641
San Miguel Beermen	41	22	19	.536
CDCP Road Builders	30	16	14	.533
Tefilin Polyesters	32	15	17	.469
Presto Fun Drinks	43	17	26	.395
YCO-Tanduay	42	13	29	.309
Finance Funders	30	9	21	.300
Gilbey's Gin/St.George Whiskies	30	8	22	.267
