= 1981 Toyota Super Diesels season =

- Head coach: Ed Ocampo
- Owner(s): Delta Motor Corporation

Open Conference results
- Record: 20–9 (69%)
- Place: 1st
- Playoff finish: Champion

Reinforced Filipino results
- Record: 9–5 (64.3%)
- Place: 5th
- Playoff finish: Round of six

Toyota Super Diesels seasons

The 1981 Toyota Super Diesels season was the seventh season of the franchise in the Philippine Basketball Association (PBA).

== Colors ==
For the Open Conference:
(dark)
(light)
For the Reinforced All-Filipino:
(dark)
(light)

== Summary ==
Former Royal Tru-Orange coach Ed Ocampo is the new head coach of Toyota now with a new moniker "Super Diesels". Import Andrew Fields is on his third year of duty, teaming up with Melton Wertz. The Superdiesels lost to Crispa, 97–112, in the opening day on March 8. After four games, Melton Wertz was replaced by Victor King. The Superdiesels were the last team to enter the four-team semifinal round. Toyota finished with an impressive five wins and one loss slate in the semifinals and played their arch rival the Crispa Redmanizers in the Open Conference finals.

The championship series between Toyota and Crispa was the 10th and what turned out to be the final time the two rivals met in the finale. The Super Diesels won the series opener, but lost the next two games and trailed 1–2 against Crispa. The Superdiesels won Game Four 116–98 to force a deciding match.

On July 25, a huge turnout of fans were on hand to witness the final game of the series which were officiated by two NBA referees, Jim Capers and Lee Jones. Toyota won over Crispa, 103-97, with Andrew Fields' three-point play in the last one minute and twenty seconds of the game turning out to be the winning basket for the Superdiesels. Center Ramon Fernandez was the top local scorer for his team, averaging 23 points per game and posting his highest output in Game Two with 29 points and tallying 20 points in Game Five.

Toyota had the smallest of imports due to the handicap ruling in the Reinforced Filipino Conference in 6–0 Archie Talley. The Super Diesels were tied with Crispa on top of the one-round elimination phase.

In the round of six, the Super Diesels lost their first two matches against the Redmanizers, 110–111, and U-Tex Wranglers, 121–125. They were booted out of contention by Yco-Tanduay after suffering their third loss in four games at the hands of the Esquires. It marks the first time in seven seasons and 20 conferences that Toyota failed to advance in the semifinal round.

== Occurrences ==
After back-to-back wins at the start of the semifinal round in the Open Conference, the Toyota Superdiesels went down to its first setback as they bowed to Crispa, 118–133 on July 7. The Superdiesels were seemingly affected by the shocking news a day earlier upon learning the death of their former coach Fort Acuña. The team showed up in their red uniforms with a piece of black cloth attached to their jerseys as a sign of mourning to the demise of their former coach.

== Award ==
Andrew Fields became the first recipient of the PBA Best Import Award when he powered Toyota to the Open Conference championship.

== Win–loss record vs opponents ==
Teams	Win	Loss	1st (Open)	2nd (RAF)
CDCP Road Builders	2	1	1-1	1-0
Crispa Redmanizers	5	6	4–5	1-1
Finance Funders	3	0	2-0	1-0
Gilbey’s Gin / St.George	3	0	2-0	1-0
Presto Fun Drinks	3	1	1-1	2-0
San Miguel Beermen	3	2	3-1	0–1
Tefilin Polyesters	2	2	1-1	1-1
U-Tex Wranglers	5	1	4-0	1-1
YCO-Tanduay	3	1	2-0	1-1
Total	29	14	20-9	9-5

== Roster ==
Toyota Superdiesels roster
Players
Coaches

Pos.	No.	Nat.	Name	Ht.	Wt.
F	6	(Philippines)	Abe King	6 ft 3 in (1.91 m)		San Beda
G	7	(Philippines)	Robert Jaworski	6 ft 1 in (1.85 m)		UE
G	8	(Philippines)	Francis Arnaiz	5 ft 11 in (1.80 m)		Ateneo
G	9	(Philippines)	Eduardo Merced	6 ft 0 in (1.83 m)		José Rizal
C	10	(Philippines)	Ramon Fernandez	6 ft 4 in (1.93 m)		San Carlos
F	11	(Philippines)	Arnie Tuadles	6 ft 2 in (1.88 m)		Visayas
G	14	(Philippines)	Rino Salazar	5 ft 9 in (1.75 m)		Letran
G/F	18	(Philippines)	Emerito Legaspi	5 ft 11 in (1.80 m)		UE
F	20	(Philippines)	Nicanor Bulaong	6 ft 4 in (1.93 m)		Far Eastern
G/F	22	(Philippines)	Danny Florencio	5 ft 10 in (1.78 m)		UST
F	41	(Philippines)	Leopoldo Herrera	6 ft 3 in (1.91 m)		Wesleyan Philippines
C	1	(United States)	Andrew Fields (I)	6 ft 9 in (2.06 m)		Cheyney
F/C	33	(United States)	Melton Wertz (I)	6 ft 9 in (2.06 m)
F/C	34	(United States)	Victor King (I)	6 ft 8 in (2.03 m)		Louisiana Tech
G	13	(United States)	Archie Talley (I)	6 ft 0 in (1.83 m)		Salem International

Head coach

- (Philippines) Ed Ocampo

Assistant coach(es)

Legend

- (C) Team captain
- (I) Import
- Injured
