= 1981 Finance Funders season =

- Head coach: Alberto Reynoso

Open Conference results
- Record: 5–13 (27.8%)
- Place: 8th
- Playoff finish: N/A

Reinforced Filipino results
- Record: 4–8 (33.3%)
- Place: 9th
- Playoff finish: N/A

Finance Funders seasons

The 1981 Finance Funders season was the 7th season of the franchise in the Philippine Basketball Association (PBA).

== Transactions ==
- Signed rookie Alejo Alolor, who previously played in Cebu and briefly saw action in the MICAA.
- Later acquired Frank Natividad from Crispa.

== Imports ==
Finance, Inc. (formerly Honda Hagibis) had 7-foot-1 Canadian Olympian Jim Zoet and 6–8 Michael Carter as their imports for the Open Conference. Carter played four games and was replaced by James Woods while his partner Jim Zoet played nine games and was replaced by B.B. Davis.

In the Reinforced Filipino Conference, the Funders import was the high-scoring Jessie Boyd.

== Win–loss record vs opponents ==
Teams	Win	Loss	1st (Open)	2nd (RAF)
CDCP Road Builders	0	4	0–2	0–2
Crispa Redmanizers	0	3	0–2	0–1
Gilbey’s Gin / St.George	4	0	2-0	2-0
Presto Fun Drinks	2	1	1-1	1-0
San Miguel Beermen	0	4	0–2	0–2
Tefilin Polyesters	0	3	0–2	0–1
Toyota Super Diesels	0	3	0–2	0–1
U-Tex Wranglers	0	3	0–2	0–1
YCO-Tanduay	3	0	2-0	1-0
Total	9	21	5–13	4–8

== Roster ==
Finance Funders roster
Players
Coaches

Pos.	No.	Nat.	Name	Ht.	Wt.
F	7	(Philippines)	Frederick Adams	6 ft 0 in (1.83 m)		TUA
F	8	(Philippines)	Teofilo Dela Cruz	5 ft 11 in (1.80 m)		Southwestern-U
G	13	(Philippines)	Mario Marasigan	5 ft 11 in (1.80 m)		UST
G	14	(Philippines)	Jesse Sullano	5 ft 9 in (1.75 m)		Southwestern-U
F	16	(Philippines)	Ronnie Albor	6 ft 2 in (1.88 m)		Southwestern-U
G/F	17	(Philippines)	Roberto Poblete	6 ft 3 in (1.91 m)		Adamson
G/F	18	(Philippines)	Alejo Alolor	6 ft 1 in (1.85 m)		Visayas
G	22	(Philippines)	Francisco Natividad	6 ft 1 in (1.85 m)		UST
G	23	(Philippines)	Oliveros Dalman	6 ft 3 in (1.91 m)		Visayas
F	24	(Philippines)	Monico Martinez	6 ft 2 in (1.88 m)		PSBA
C	45	(Philippines)	Redentor Vicente	6 ft 5 in (1.96 m)		José Rizal
F/C		(United States)	Michael Carter (I)	6 ft 8 in (2.03 m)		Drury
C	12	(Canada)	Jim Zoet (I)	7 ft 1 in (2.16 m)		Kent State
F	1	(United States)	James Woods (I)	6 ft 7 in (2.01 m)
F/C	44	(United States)	B.B. Davis (I)	6 ft 8 in (2.03 m)		Lamar
F	6	(United States)	Jessie Boyd (I)	6 ft 5 in (1.96 m)

Head coach

- (Philippines) Alberto Reynoso

Assistant coach(es)

Legend

- (C) Team captain
- (I) Import
- Injured
