= List of Philippine Basketball Association imports (A–E) =

This is a list of imports who have played or currently playing in the Philippine Basketball Association.

^	Denotes player who won the PBA Best Import Award.
*	Denotes player who has been inducted to the PBA Hall of Fame.

== A ==
Nat.	Name	Pos.	Ht.	Wt.	Playing years	College/University	Ref.
(Jordan)	Mahmoud Abdeen	G	6 ft 3 in (1.91 m)	193 lb (88 kg)	2016	ASPU	
(Iceland)	Kristófer Acox	F	6 ft 6 in (1.98 m)	216 lb (98 kg)	2017	Furman	
(United States)	Hassan Adams	G/F	6 ft 4 in (1.93 m)	220 lb (100 kg)	2011	Arizona	
(United States)	Rich Adams	F/C	6 ft 9 in (2.06 m)	205 lb (93 kg)	1982–83; 1985	Illinois	No information
(Nigeria)	Kenny Adeleke	F/C	6 ft 9 in (2.06 m)	240 lb (109 kg)	2016	Hofstra; Hartford	
(United States)	C. J. Aiken	F	6 ft 9 in (2.06 m)	200 lb (91 kg)	2018	St. Joseph's	
(Lebanon)	Rodrigue Akl	G	6 ft 1 in (1.85 m)	181 lb (82 kg)	2016	No information	
(Nigeria)	Solomon Alabi	C	7 ft 1 in (2.16 m)	250 lb (113 kg)	2015	Florida State	
(United States)	Kwame Alexander	F	6 ft 5 in (1.96 m)	240 lb (109 kg)	2015; 2019	Irvine Valley; Cal State San Bernardino	
(Canada)	Bobby Allen	G	6 ft 3 in (1.91 m)	205 lb (93 kg)	1995; 1998	Spoon River; UT Rio Grande	No information
(United States)	Darrell Allums	F	6 ft 9 in (2.06 m)	220 lb (100 kg)	1981	UCLA	
(United States)	George Almones	G/F	6 ft 4 in (1.93 m)	190 lb (86 kg)	1988	UL Lafayette	
(United States)	Mildon Ambres	G	6 ft 6 in (1.98 m)	213 lb (97 kg)	2010	Louisiana State; Southern Miss; Southern Nazarene	
(United States)	Mychal Ammons	F	6 ft 5 in (1.96 m)	225 lb (102 kg)	2016; 2019	South Alabama	
(United States)	Lou Amundson	F/C	6 ft 9 in (2.06 m)	220 lb (100 kg)	2017	UNLV	
(United States)	Benny Anders	F	6 ft 6 in (1.98 m)	220 lb (100 kg)	1986	Houston	
(United States)	Dwight Anderson	G	6 ft 3 in (1.91 m)	185 lb (84 kg)	1986–87	Kentucky; Southern Cal	No information
(United States)	Michael Anderson	G	5 ft 11 in (1.80 m)	184 lb (83 kg)	1990	Drexel	
(Japan)	Seiya Ando	G	5 ft 11 in (1.80 m)	176 lb (80 kg)	2015	Meiji	
(United States)	Harold Arceneaux	G/F	6 ft 6 in (1.98 m)	215 lb (98 kg)	2003	USU Eastern; Weber State	
(Canada) (Nigeria)	Olu Ashaolu	F	6 ft 7 in (2.01 m)	220 lb (100 kg)	2018–19	Louisiana Tech; Oregon	
(United States)	Vincent Askew	G/F	6 ft 6 in (1.98 m)	235 lb (107 kg)	1988	Memphis	

== B ==
Nat.	Name	Pos.	Ht.	Wt.	Playing years	College/University	Ref.
(United States)	Terrance Bailey	G	6 ft 2 in (1.88 m)	180 lb (82 kg)	1989; 1991	Wagner	
(United States)	Maurice Baker	G	6 ft 1 in (1.85 m)	185 lb (84 kg)	2011	Utah Tech; Oklahoma State	
(Puerto Rico)	Renaldo Balkman	F	6 ft 7 in (2.01 m)	212 lb (96 kg)	2013; 2018	South Carolina	
(United States) (Sierra Leone)	Alpha Bangura	F	6 ft 6 in (1.98 m)	215 lb (98 kg)	2011	Monmouth; St. John's	
(United States)	George Banks	F	6 ft 7 in (2.01 m)	210 lb (95 kg)	2002	Central Arizona; UTEP	
(United States)	Kyle Barone	C	6 ft 10 in (2.08 m)	250 lb (113 kg)	2019	Idaho	
(United States)	Earl Barron	F/C	7 ft 0 in (2.13 m)	250 lb (113 kg)	2005; 2012	Memphis	
(United States)	Eddie Basden	G	6 ft 5 in (1.96 m)	215 lb (98 kg)	2012	UN Charlotte	
(United States)	Billy Ray Bates	C	6 ft 4 in (1.93 m)	211 lb (96 kg)70	1983; 1986–88	Kentucky State	
(United States)	Kenny Battle	F	6 ft 6 in (1.98 m)	210 lb (95 kg)	2012	Northern Illinois; UI Urbana–Champaign	
(United States)	Rashad Bell	F	6 ft 8 in (2.03 m)	212 lb (96 kg)	2007; 2009–10	Boston	
(United States)	Mario Bennett	F	6 ft 9 in (2.06 m)	235 lb (107 kg)	2002	Arizona State	
(United States)	Keith Benson	F/C	6 ft 11 in (2.11 m)	235 lb (107 kg)	2013	Oakland	
(United States)	Curtis Berry	F	6 ft 7 in (2.01 m)	215 lb (98 kg)	1982	Missouri	No information
(United States)	John Best	F	6 ft 8 in (2.03 m)	216 lb (98 kg)	1995; 1997–2000	Tennessee Tech	
(United States)	Joe Binion	F	6 ft 8 in (2.03 m)	235 lb (107 kg)	1985	N.C. A&T	
(United States) (Panama)	Tony Bishop	F	6 ft 7 in (2.01 m)	220 lb (100 kg)	2021–22	Richland; Texas State	
(United States)	Norman Black	C	6 ft 5 in (1.96 m)	186 lb (84 kg)	1981–83; 1985-88; 1990; 1996; 1998	St. Joseph's	
(United States)	Cory Blackwell	F	6 ft 6 in (1.98 m)	210 lb (95 kg)	1985	Madison	
(United States)	Marqus Blakely	G/F	6 ft 5 in (1.96 m)	231 lb (105 kg)	2012–16; 2018–19	Vermont	
(United States)	Micah Blunt	C	6 ft 9 in (2.06 m)	210 lb (95 kg)	1982	Tulane	No information
(United States)	Josh Boone	F/C	6 ft 10 in (2.08 m)	237 lb (108 kg)	2014	Connecticut	
(United States)	Lawrence Boston	F	6 ft 8 in (2.03 m)	225 lb (102 kg)	1982	Vincennes; Maryland	No information
(United States)	Cinmeon Bowers	F	6 ft 7 in (2.01 m)	250 lb (113 kg)	2017	Chipola; Auburn	
(United States)	Denzel Bowles	F/C	6 ft 11 in (2.11 m)	255 lb (116 kg)	2012–13; 2015–16	Texas A&M; James Madison	
(United States)	Cedric Bozeman	G/F	6 ft 6 in (1.98 m)	215 lb (98 kg)	2012	UCLA	
(United States)	Torraye Braggs	F	6 ft 8 in (2.03 m)	245 lb (111 kg)	2004	San Jose CC; Xavier	
(United States)	Tim Breaux	F	6 ft 7 in (2.01 m)	215 lb (98 kg)	2003	Wyoming	
(United States)	Carlos Briggs	G	6 ft 1 in (1.85 m)	185 lb (84 kg)	1989-90	Schoolcaft; Baylor	
(United States)	Michael Britt	F	6 ft 7 in (2.01 m)	185 lb (84 kg)	1985	District of Columbia	
(United States)	Andre Brown	F/C	6 ft 9 in (2.06 m)	245 lb (111 kg)	2005	DePaul	
(United States)	Brandon Brown	F/C	6 ft 6 in (1.98 m)	242 lb (110 kg)	2017	Dallas College; Holmes CC; Cal State San Bernardino	
(Canada)	Denham Brown	G/F	6 ft 6 in (1.98 m)	220 lb (100 kg)	2010	Connecticut	
(United States)	Eric Brown	F	6 ft 6 in (1.98 m)	195 lb (88 kg)	1991	Miami	(no information)
(United States)	Ernest Brown	C	7 ft 0 in (2.13 m)	244 lb (111 kg)	2008	Indian Hills CC	
(Japan)	Ira Brown	F	6 ft 4 in (1.93 m)	231 lb (105 kg)	2011	Phoenix; Gonzaga	
(United States)	Johnny Brown	F	6 ft 6 in (1.98 m)	215 lb (98 kg)	1986	Loyola Marymount; New Mexico	No information
(United States)	Lewis Brown	C	6 ft 11 in (2.11 m)	225 lb (102 kg)	1980; 1982; 1985	UNLV	No information
(United States)	Justin Brownlee	F	6 ft 7 in (2.01 m)	219 lb (99 kg)	2016–20; 2021–22	CC San Francisco; Chipola; St. John's	
(United States)	Rick Brunson	G	6 ft 4 in (1.93 m)	190 lb (86 kg)	1998	Temple	
(United States)	J'Nathan Bullock	F	6 ft 4 in (1.93 m)	240 lb (109 kg)	2017–18	Cleveland State	
(United States)	Joe Bunn	F/C	6 ft 6 in (1.98 m)	232 lb (105 kg)	2002	N.C. A&T; Old Dominion; Phillips	
(United States)	Chris Burgess	F/C	6 ft 10 in (2.08 m)	245 lb (111 kg)	2005	Duke; Utah	
(United States)	Scott Burrell	G/F	6 ft 7 in (2.01 m)	218 lb (99 kg)	2003–04	Connecticut	
(United States)	Steve Burtt Sr.	G	6 ft 2 in (1.88 m)	185 lb (84 kg)	1989	Iona	
(United States)	Brian Butch	C	6 ft 11 in (2.11 m)	240 lb (109 kg)	2014	Madison	

== C ==
Nat.	Name	Pos.	Ht.	Wt.	Playing years	College/University	Ref.
(United States)	Rick Calloway	G	6 ft 6 in (1.98 m)	180 lb (82 kg)	1992	IU Bloomington; Kansas	
(United States)	Antonio Campbell	F	6 ft 8 in (2.03 m)	265 lb (120 kg)	2018	Ohio	
(United States)	Damian Cantrell	F	6 ft 6 in (1.98 m)	233 lb (106 kg)	2003; 2005–06	Ventura; San Francisco	
(United States)	Derrick Caracter	F/C	6 ft 9 in (2.06 m)	125 lb (57 kg)	2015	Louisville; UTEP	
(United States)	Rodney Carney	G/F	6 ft 7 in (2.01 m)	205 lb (93 kg)	2014	Memphis	
(United States)	Chris Carrawell	G	6 ft 6 in (1.98 m)	220 lb (100 kg)	2002	Duke	
(United States) (France)	Howard Carter	G	6 ft 5 in (1.96 m)	215 lb (98 kg)	1985	Louisiana State	No information
(United States)	Russell Carter	G	6 ft 4 in (1.93 m)	200 lb (91 kg)	2011	Notre Dame	
(United States)	Cedric Ceballos	F	6 ft 6 in (1.98 m)	190 lb (86 kg)	2003–04	Ventura; Cal State Fullerton	
(United States)	Sean Chambers	F	6 ft 2 in (1.88 m)	196 lb (89 kg)	1989–01	Cuesta; Cal Poly San Luis Obispo	
(United States)	Marquin Chandler	F	6 ft 8 in (2.03 m)	202 lb (92 kg)	2005–06; 2009	George Washington; San Jose State	
(Taiwan)	Jet Chang	G	6 ft 4 in (1.93 m)	195 lb (88 kg)	2015	BYU Hawaii	
(United States)	Chris Charles	C	7 ft 1 in (2.16 m)	225 lb (102 kg)	2015	Villanova	
(United States)	Mo Charlo	F	6 ft 7 in (2.01 m)	210 lb (95 kg)	2016	Diablo Valley; UN Reno	
(United States)	Irv Chatman	C	6 ft 9 in (2.06 m)	230 lb (104 kg)	1979–80	Tennessee; Rhode Island	No information
(United States)	Derrick Chievous	F	6 ft 7 in (2.01 m)	195 lb (88 kg)	1992	Missouri	
(United States) (Bahrain)	Wayne Chism	F/C	6 ft 8 in (2.03 m)	245 lb (111 kg)	2014–18	Tennessee	
(United States)	Rakeem Christmas	F	6 ft 9 in (2.06 m)	250 lb (113 kg)	2019	Syracuse	
(United States)	Carlos Clark	G	6 ft 2 in (1.88 m)	196 lb (89 kg)	1990	Ole Miss	
(United States)	Joe Ira Clark	F/C	6 ft 8 in (2.03 m)	236 lb (107 kg)	1999–00	Temple; UT Austin	No information
(United States)	Fred Cofield	G	6 ft 3 in (1.91 m)	190 lb (86 kg)	1986–87; 1996	Oregon; Eastern Michigan	
(United States)	Lorenzo Coleman	C	7 ft 1 in (2.16 m)	264 lb (120 kg)	2005	Tennessee Tech	
(United States)	Tank Collins	F	6 ft 5 in (1.96 m)	215 lb (98 kg)	1992	Salt Lake CC; New Orleans	No information
(United States)	Steve Colter	G	6 ft 3 in (1.91 m)	165 lb (75 kg)	1992	NM State	
(United States) (Philippines)	Alex Compton	G	5 ft 11 in (1.80 m)	175 lb (79 kg)	2006–08	St. Joseph's; Cornell	
(United States)	Lenny Cooke	G	6 ft 6 in (1.98 m)	206 lb (93 kg)	2003–04	No information	
(United States) (Australia)	Lanard Copeland	G/F	6 ft 7 in (2.01 m)	194 lb (88 kg)	1991	Georgia State	
(United States)	Jamelle Cornley	F	6 ft 5 in (1.96 m)	215 lb (98 kg)	2012	Pennsylvania State	
(United States)	Marcus Cousin	C	6 ft 11 in (2.11 m)	255 lb (116 kg)	2015	Seton Hall; Houston	
(United States)	D. J. Covington	F/C	6 ft 9 in (2.06 m)	235 lb (107 kg)	2015	VMI	
(United States)	Winston Crite	F	6 ft 7 in (2.01 m)	283 lb (128 kg)	1990; 1992	Texas A&M	
(United States)	Markeith Cummings	F	6 ft 4 in (1.93 m)	229 lb (104 kg)	2013; 2017	Kennesaw	
(United States)	Ace Custis	F	6 ft 7 in (2.01 m)	220 lb (100 kg)	2005	Virginia Tech	

== D ==
Nat.	Name	Pos.	Ht.	Wt.	Playing years	College/University	Ref.
(Jordan)	Sam Daghles	G	6 ft 6 in (1.98 m)	200 lb (91 kg)	2015	Mesa; MSU Texas	
(United States)	Chris Daniels	C	6 ft 10 in (2.08 m)	265 lb (120 kg)	2019	Texas A&M Corpus Christi	
(United States)	Shawn Daniels	F	6 ft 8 in (2.03 m)	250 lb (113 kg)	1999–00; 2006; 2009–11	Bakersfield; Utah State	
(United States)	Ben Davis	F	6 ft 9 in (2.06 m)	242 lb (110 kg)	No information	Kansas; Hutchinson CC; Arizona	
(United States) (Spain)	Devin Davis	F	6 ft 7 in (2.01 m)	235 lb (107 kg)	1998–99	Miami	
(United States)	Josh Davis	F	6 ft 8 in (2.03 m)	214 lb (97 kg)	2016–16	NC State; Tulane; San Diego State	
(United States)	Mark Davis	F	6 ft 7 in (2.01 m)	210 lb (95 kg)	2002	Howard; Texas Tech	
(United States)	Eric Dawson	F/C	6 ft 9 in (2.06 m)	250 lb (113 kg)	2013; 2016	McLennan CC; Midwestern State	
(United States)	Larry Demic	F/C	6 ft 9 in (2.06 m)	225 lb (102 kg)	1983	Arizona	
(United States)	Dell Demps	G	6 ft 3 in (1.91 m)	205 lb (93 kg)	1992; 1994	Pacific	
(United States)	Jason Dixon	C	6 ft 9 in (2.06 m)	242 lb (110 kg)	No information	Eastern Wyoming; Liberty	
(United States) (Philippines)	Marcus Douthit	C	6 ft 11 in (2.11 m)	233 lb (106 kg)	2013; 2015	Providence	
(United States)	Robert Dozier	F	6 ft 9 in (2.06 m)	215 lb (98 kg)	2013–14; 2016; 2019	Memphis	
(United States)	Terry Duerod	G	6 ft 2 in (1.88 m)	189 lb (86 kg)	1986	Detroit Mercy	
(United States)	Michael Dunigan	C	6 ft 9 in (2.06 m)	254 lb (115 kg)	2013; 2015	Oregon	
(United States)	Allen Durham	F/C	6 ft 6 in (1.98 m)	236 lb (107 kg)	2014; 2016–20	Grace Christian	
(United States)	Pat Durham	F	6 ft 7 in (2.01 m)	210 lb (95 kg)	1993	Colorado State	No information

== E ==
Nat.	Name	Pos.	Ht.	Wt.	Playing years	College/University	Ref.
(United States)	Jerry Eaves	G	6 ft 4 in (1.93 m)	180 lb (82 kg)	No information	Louisville	
(United States)	Shane Edwards	F	6 ft 8 in (2.03 m)	220 lb (100 kg)	2016	Northeastern; UA Little Rock	
(United States)	Ed Elisma	F/C	6 ft 9 in (2.06 m)	213 lb (97 kg)	2004–05	Georgia Tech	No information
(United States)	Harold Ellis	G	6 ft 5 in (1.96 m)	225 lb (102 kg)	2001–03; 2007; 2009	Morehouse	
(United States)	Rosell Ellis	F	6 ft 6 in (1.98 m)	209 lb (95 kg)	2001–03; 2007; 2009	Utah State; McNeese	
(United States)	Andre Emmett	G/F	6 ft 5 in (1.96 m)	230 lb (104 kg)	2015	Texas Tech	
(United States) (Philippines)	Chip Engelland	G	6 ft 4 in (1.93 m)	175 lb (79 kg)	1984-86	Duke	
(United States)	Jo Jo English	G	6 ft 4 in (1.93 m)	195 lb (88 kg)	1992–93; 1996	South Carolina	

== More PBA imports lists ==
A–E | F–J | K–O | P–T | U–Z
