= 1981 Tefilin Polyesters season =

- Head coach: Fely Fajardo
- Owner(s): Filipinas Synthetic Fiber Corporation

Open Conference results
- Record: 10–8 (55.6%)
- Place: 5th
- Playoff finish: N/A

Reinforced Filipino results
- Record: 5–9 (35.7%)
- Place: 6th
- Playoff finish: Round of six

Tefilin Polyesters seasons

The 1981 Tefilin Polyesters season was the 2nd and final season of the franchise in the Philippine Basketball Association (PBA).

== Summary ==
Tefilin's import from the previous season – Ira Terrell, returned for the Open Conference, this time teaming up with former Royal Tru-Orange import Larry Pounds. Tefilin was tied with CDCP Road Builders after 18 games in the eliminations. Both sophomore ballclubs missed out a semifinal berth and were two games behind fourth qualifier Toyota Super Diesels.

The Polyesters signed up Norman Black, who played for the Detroit Pistons in the Southern California Summer Pro league, as their import in the Reinforced Filipino Conference. Black led the Polyesters to move into the next round for the first time in four conferences.

== Win–loss record vs opponents ==
Teams	Win	Loss	1st (Open)	2nd (RAF)
CDCP Road Builders	2	1	1-1	1-0
Crispa Redmanizers	0	4	0–2	0–2
Finance Funders	3	0	2-0	1-0
Gilbey’s Gin / St.George	1	2	0–2	1-0
Presto Fun Drinks	2	2	2-0	0–2
San Miguel Beermen	2	1	1-1	1-0
Toyota Super Diesels	2	2	1-1	1-1
U-Tex Wranglers	1	3	1-1	0–2
YCO-Tanduay	2	2	2-0	0–2
Total	15	17	10-8	5–9

== Scoring record ==
Norman Black poured in 71 points in Tefilin's 129–141 loss to Crispa in their quarterfinal game on October 27. Black's 71-point total was four points shy of the 75 points made by CDCP's Ronald McCoy in this same conference just a month before on September 26. Norman Black's total output was the fourth all-time best scoring record behind the 75 points jointly shared by Ronald McCoy and Harry Rogers of 7-Up in 1976, the 74 points made by Yco-Tanduay's Russell Murray, also in this same conference and the 73 points set by Carl Bird of Royal Tru-Orange in 1976.

== Roster ==
Tefilin roster
Players
Coaches

Pos.	No.	Nat.	Name	Ht.	Wt.
G	5	(Philippines)	Marty Tierra	5 ft 11 in (1.80 m)		José Rizal
F	6	(Philippines)	Gregorio Gozum	6 ft 2 in (1.88 m)		Letran
G	7	(Philippines)	Efren Manila	5 ft 11 in (1.80 m)
F	8	(Philippines)	Ricardo Mariano	6 ft 0 in (1.83 m)		Mapúa
G	9	(Philippines)	Joselito Ocampo	6 ft 1 in (1.85 m)		PSBA
C	10	(Philippines)	Danilo Mendoza	6 ft 5 in (1.96 m)		Letran
G	11	(Philippines)	Jose Orozco	5 ft 9 in (1.75 m)		UST
C	14	(Philippines)	Mario Basco	6 ft 3 in (1.91 m)		San Sebastian
G	20	(Philippines)	Fernando De Guzman	5 ft 9 in (1.75 m)		Letran
F	21	(Philippines)	Jovenal Francisco	6 ft 0 in (1.83 m)		Far Eastern
F	24	(Philippines)	Caesar Yabut	6 ft 2 in (1.88 m)		Mapúa
F		(Philippines)	Amadeo Sagarbarria	6 ft 2 in (1.88 m)		De La Salle
F	25	(United States)	Larry Pounds (I)	6 ft 7 in (2.01 m)		Washington
F/C	32	(United States)	Ira Terrell (I)	6 ft 8 in (2.03 m)		SMU
F	15	(United States)	Norman Black (I)	6 ft 5 in (1.96 m)		Saint Joseph's

Head coach

- (Philippines) Fely Fajardo

Assistant coach(es)

- (Philippines) Jun Bernardino

Legend

- (C) Team captain
- (I) Import
- Injured
