= List of Philippine Basketball Association imports (P–T) =

This is a list of imports who have played or currently playing in the Philippine Basketball Association.

^	Denotes player who won the PBA Best Import Award.
*	Denotes player who has been inducted to the PBA Hall of Fame.
†	Denotes player who has been inducted to the 40 Greatest Players in PBA History

== P ==
Nat.	Name	Pos.	Ht.	Wt.	Playing years	College/University	Ref.
(United States)	Victor Page	G	6 ft 3 in (1.91 m)	200 lb (91 kg)	1998	Georgetown	No information
(Mexico)	Adam Parada	C	7 ft 0 in (2.13 m)	265 lb (120 kg)	2012	UC Irvine	
(United States)	Bobby Parks	G	6 ft 4 in (1.93 m)	No information	1987–89; 1990–93; 1997–99	Memphis	
(United States)	Myles Patrick	F/C	6 ft 8 in (2.03 m)	No information	No information	Auburn	No information
(United States)	Kenny Payne	F	6 ft 8 in (2.03 m)	195 lb (88 kg)	1998	Louisville	
(United States)	Frederick Pea	G/F	6 ft 7 in (2.01 m)	233 lb (106 kg)	1995	Tampa; South Florida	No information
(United States)	Steffphon Pettigrew	F/C	6 ft 5 in (1.96 m)	220 lb (100 kg)	2015	Western Kentucky	
(United States)	Eugene Phelps	F	6 ft 6 in (1.98 m)	225 lb (102 kg)	2016–19	The Beach	
(United States)	Mike Phelps	G	6 ft 4 in (1.93 m)	180 lb (82 kg)	1988–90	Alcorn State	
(United States)	Tim Pickett	F	6 ft 4 in (1.93 m)	198 lb (90 kg)	2011	Daytona; Indian River State; Florida State	
(United States)	Kevinn Pinkney	F/C	6 ft 10 in (2.08 m)	245 lb (111 kg)	2016	UN Reno	
(United States)	David Pope	F	6 ft 7 in (2.01 m)	220 lb (100 kg)	No information	Norfolk State	
(United States)	Chris Porter	F	6 ft 7 in (2.01 m)	214 lb (97 kg)	2005–06; 2011	Chipola; Auburn	
(United States)	Kevin Porter	G	6 ft 0 in (1.83 m)	170 lb (77 kg)	1983	St. Francis	
(United States)	Josh Powell	F/C	6 ft 9 in (2.06 m)	240 lb (109 kg)	2014	NC State	

== Q ==
Nat.	Name	Pos.	Ht.	Wt.	Playing years	College/University	Ref.
(United States)	Michael Qualls	G	6 ft 4 in (1.93 m)	202 lb (92 kg)	2019	Arkansas	
(United States)	Daren Queenan	G/F	6 ft 4 in (1.93 m)	170 lb (77 kg)	1989-90	Lehigh	

== R ==
Nat.	Name	Pos.	Ht.	Wt.	Playing years	College/University	Ref.
(United States) (South Korea)	Ra Gun-ah	F	6 ft 8 in (2.03 m)	240 lb (109 kg)	2016–17	CC Florida; Missouri	
(Puerto Rico)	Peter John Ramos	C	7 ft 4 in (2.24 m)	296 lb (134 kg)	2015	No information	
(United States)	Wally Rank	G	6 ft 6 in (1.98 m)	220 lb (100 kg)	1985	San Jose State	
(United States)	Eldridge Recasner	G	6 ft 3 in (1.91 m)	190 lb (86 kg)	1992	Washington	
(United States)	George Reese	F	6 ft 7 in (2.01 m)	233 lb (106 kg)	2004	Ohio State	
(United States)	Arizona Reid	F	6 ft 5 in (1.96 m)	205 lb (93 kg)	2011; 2013–16; 2018	High Point	
(United States)	Fred Reynolds	F	6 ft 6 in (1.98 m)	207 lb (94 kg)	No information	UTEP	
(United States)	Scottie Reynolds	G	6 ft 2 in (1.88 m)	192 lb (87 kg)	2011	Villanova	
(Morocco)	Reda Rhalimi	C	6 ft 8 in (2.03 m)	No information	2008	No information	
(United States)	M. J. Rhett	F/C	6 ft 9 in (2.06 m)	235 lb (107 kg)	2016	Tennessee State; Ole Miss	
(United States)	Charles Rhodes	F/C	6 ft 8 in (2.03 m)	240 lb (109 kg)	2017; 2019	Mississippi State	
(United States)	Rodrick Rhodes	G/F	6 ft 6 in (1.98 m)	225 lb (102 kg)	2002	Kentucky; Southern Cal	
(United States)	Darius Rice	F	6 ft 10 in (2.08 m)	222 lb (101 kg)	2007–08	Miami	
(United States)	Glen Rice Jr.	G/F	6 ft 6 in (1.98 m)	206 lb (93 kg)	2017	Georgia Tech	
(United States)	Ron Riley	F	6 ft 5 in (1.96 m)	200 lb (91 kg)	2002	Arizona State	
(United States)	Anthony Roberts	G/F	6 ft 5 in (1.96 m)	185 lb (84 kg)	No information	Oral Roberts	No information
(United States) (Dominican Republic)	Ronald Roberts	F/C	6 ft 8 in (2.03 m)	225 lb (102 kg)	2015	St. Joseph's	
(United States)	Larry Robinson	G/F	6 ft 3 in (1.91 m)	180 lb (82 kg)	1997; 1999	Eastern Oklahoma; Centenary	
(United States)	Melvin Robinson	C	6 ft 10 in (2.08 m)	No information	2005	St. Louis	
(United States) (Venezuela)	Leon Rodgers	F	6 ft 6 in (1.98 m)	216 lb (98 kg)	2014	Northern Illinois	
(United States) (Australia)	Robert Rose	G	6 ft 5 in (1.96 m)	211 lb (96 kg)	1990	George Mason	
(United States)	Richard Ross	F	6 ft 5 in (1.96 m)	239 lb (108 kg)	2019	Old Dominion	
(United States)	Derrick Rowland	G	6 ft 5 in (1.96 m)	195 lb (88 kg)	No information	SUNY Potsdam	No information
(United States)	Walker Russell	G	6 ft 5 in (1.96 m)	195 lb (88 kg)	1989–90	Oakland CC; Houston; Western Michigan	

== S ==
Nat.	Name	Pos.	Ht.	Wt.	Playing years	College/University	Ref.
(United States) (Egypt)	Omar Samhan	C	6 ft 11 in (2.11 m)	268 lb (122 kg)	2012	St. Mary's Cal	
(United States)	Kenny Sanders	F	6 ft 5 in (1.96 m)	No information	1991	George Mason	No information
(United States)	Mark Sanford	G/F	6 ft 10 in (2.08 m)	230 lb (104 kg)	2004	Washington	
(United States)	Corey Santee	G	6 ft 2 in (1.88 m)	190 lb (86 kg)	2008	Texas Christian	
(United States)	Jason Sasser	F	6 ft 7 in (2.01 m)	225 lb (102 kg)	2001	Texas Tech	
(United States)	DeWayne Scales	F	6 ft 8 in (2.03 m)	208 lb (94 kg)	No information	Louisiana State	
(United States)	Carey Scurry	F	6 ft 7 in (2.01 m)	188 lb (85 kg)	No information	Oklahoma A&M; LIU Brooklyn	No information
(United States)	Shea Seals	G	6 ft 5 in (1.96 m)	210 lb (95 kg)	No information	Tulsa	
(United States)	Ansu Sesay	F	6 ft 6 in (1.98 m)	225 lb (102 kg)	2000	Mississippi	
(United States)	Walter Sharpe	F	6 ft 9 in (2.06 m)	245 lb (111 kg)	2013	Mississippi State; UA Birmingham	
(United States)	Dexter Shouse	G	6 ft 2 in (1.88 m)	200 lb (91 kg)	1986–87; 1989	Panola; South Alabama	
(United States)	Marcus Simmons	G	6 ft 6 in (1.98 m)	220 lb (100 kg)	2016	Southern Cal	
(United States)	David Simon	C	6 ft 9 in (2.06 m)	260 lb (118 kg)	2016	PU Fort Wayne	
(United States)	Melvin Simon	F	6 ft 8 in (2.03 m)	230 lb (104 kg)	No information	New Orleans	No information
(United States)	Dickey Simpkins	F	6 ft 9 in (2.06 m)	248 lb (112 kg)	2005	Providence	
(United States)	Diamon Simpson	F/C	6 ft 7 in (2.01 m)	230 lb (104 kg)	2010; 2018–19	St. Mary's	
(United States)	Trevis Simpson	G/F	6 ft 4 in (1.93 m)	185 lb (84 kg)	2017	UNC Greensboro	
(United States)	Henry Sims	F/C	6 ft 11 in (2.11 m)	247 lb (112 kg)	2013	Georgetown	
(United States)	Mike Singletary	F	6 ft 6 in (1.98 m)	227 lb (103 kg)	2013; 2016	Texas Tech	
(United States)	McKinley Singleton	G	6 ft 5 in (1.96 m)	175 lb (79 kg)	No information	Shelby State; UA Birmingham	
(United States)	Jose Slaughter	G	6 ft 5 in (1.96 m)	205 lb (93 kg)	1987; 1990	Portland	No information
(United States) (Lebanon)	Donald Sloan	G	6 ft 3 in (1.91 m)	205 lb (93 kg)	2011	Texas A&M	
(United States)	Keith Smart	G	6 ft 1 in (1.85 m)	175 lb (79 kg)	1989	Garden City CC; IU Bloomington	
(United States)	Clinton Smith	F	6 ft 6 in (1.98 m)	210 lb (95 kg)	No information	Ohio State; Central Arizona; Cleveland State	No information
(United States)	Greg Smith	F/C	6 ft 11 in (2.11 m)	251 lb (114 kg)	2017	Fresno State	
(United States)	JaJuan Smith	G	6 ft 2 in (1.88 m)	195 lb (88 kg)	2011	Tennessee	
(United States)	Joshua Smith	C	6 ft 10 in (2.08 m)	290 lb (132 kg)	2017–18	UCLA; Georgetown	
(United States)	Stevin Smith	G	6 ft 1 in (1.85 m)	195 lb (88 kg)	1995	Arizona State	
(United States)	Tommy Smith	F	6 ft 10 in (2.08 m)	215 lb (98 kg)	2005	Arizona State	No information
(United States)	Omar Sneed	F	6 ft 6 in (1.98 m)	239 lb (108 kg)	2012	San Jacinto; Memphis	
(United States)	Everette Stephens	G	6 ft 2 in (1.88 m)	175 lb (79 kg)	1990	Purdue	No information
(United States)	Alex Stepheson	F/C	6 ft 10 in (2.08 m)	249 lb (113 kg)	2017; 2019	UNC Chapel Hill; Southern Cal	
(United States)	Curtis Stinson	G	6 ft 3 in (1.91 m)	215 lb (98 kg)	2011	Iowa State	
(United States)	Awvee Storey	G/F	6 ft 6 in (1.98 m)	225 lb (102 kg)	2010	UI Urbana–Champaign; Arizona State	
(United States)	John Strickland	F	6 ft 8 in (2.03 m)	No information	No information	Hawaii Pacific	
(United States)	Lamont Strothers	G	6 ft 5 in (1.96 m)	191 lb (87 kg)	1997–02	CNU	
(United States)	Dominique Sutton	F	6 ft 5 in (1.96 m)	212 lb (96 kg)	2016	Kansas State; NC Central	
(Croatia)	Bruno Šundov	C	7 ft 3 in (2.21 m)	270 lb (122 kg)	2013	No information	

== T ==
Nat.	Name	Pos.	Ht.	Wt.	Playing years	College/University	Ref.
(United States)	John Taft	G	6 ft 2 in (1.88 m)	No information	1991	Marshall	No information
(United States)	Shawn Taggart	F/C	6 ft 9 in (2.06 m)	229 lb (104 kg)	2016–16	Iowa State; Memphis	
(United States)	Archie Talley	F	6 ft 1 in (1.85 m)	170 lb (77 kg)	No information	Salem	No information
(United States)	Earl Tatum	G/F	6 ft 5 in (1.96 m)	185 lb (84 kg)	No information	Marquette	
(United States)	Jay Taylor	G	6 ft 3 in (1.91 m)	199 lb (90 kg)	1991-1992; 1995	Eastern Illinois	
(United States)	Jeff Taylor	G	6 ft 4 in (1.93 m)	175 lb (79 kg)	No information	Texas Tech	No information
(United States)	Jimmie Taylor	C	6 ft 10 in (2.08 m)	248 lb (112 kg)	2019	Alabama	
(United States)	Johnny Taylor	F	6 ft 9 in (2.06 m)	220 lb (100 kg)	2002	Knoxville; Indian Hills CC; UT Chattanooga	
(United States)	Ira Terrell	F/C	6 ft 8 in (2.03 m)	200 lb (91 kg)	No information	Southern Methodist	No information
(United States)	Carlos Terry	G	6 ft 5 in (1.96 m)	210 lb (95 kg)	1978	Salem State	
(United States)	David Thirdkill	G/F	6 ft 7 in (2.01 m)	196 lb (89 kg)	1986–88	Southern Idaho; Bradley	
(United States)	Billy Thomas	G	6 ft 5 in (1.96 m)	220 lb (100 kg)	No information	Kansas	
(United States)	Carl Thomas	G	6 ft 4 in (1.93 m)	174 lb (79 kg)	No information	Eastern Michigan	
(United States)	Omar Thomas	G/F	6 ft 5 in (1.96 m)	232 lb (105 kg)	2005–06	Panola; UTEP	
(United States)	Steven Thomas	F/C	6 ft 9 in (2.06 m)	245 lb (111 kg)	2008; 2014	Georgia; MT State	
(United States)	Bernard Thompson	G/F	6 ft 6 in (1.98 m)	210 lb (95 kg)	1994	Fresno State	
(United States)	Billy Thompson	G/F	6 ft 7 in (2.01 m)	195 lb (88 kg)	1994	Louisville	
(United States)	Calvin Thompson	F	6 ft 6 in (1.98 m)	205 lb (93 kg)	1987	Kansas	No information
(United States)	Al Thornton	F	6 ft 8 in (2.03 m)	235 lb (107 kg)	2015–16	Florida State	
(United States) (Australia)	Marcus Timmons	F/C	6 ft 8 in (2.03 m)	220 lb (100 kg)	No information	SIU Carbondale	
(United States)	Dean Tolson	F	6 ft 8 in (2.03 m)	190 lb (86 kg)	1979; 1981	Arkansas	
(United States)	Kenny Travis	G/F	6 ft 2 in (1.88 m)	175 lb (79 kg)	1988; 1992–95	Fresno City; NM State	
(United States)	Romeo Travis	F	6 ft 6 in (1.98 m)	230 lb (104 kg)	2018–19	Akron	
(United States)	Jabril Trawick	G/F	6 ft 6 in (1.98 m)	215 lb (98 kg)	2017	Georgetown	
(United States)	Ansley Truitt	C	6 ft 9 in (2.06 m)	215 lb (98 kg)	1978	UC Berkeley	
(Mongolia)	Tungalagiin Sanchir	G/F	6 ft 4 in (1.93 m)	200 lb (91 kg)	2015	No information	
(United States)	Eric Turner	G	6 ft 3 in (1.91 m)	180 lb (82 kg)	1986	Michigan	
(United States)	Rahshon Turner	F/C	6 ft 7 in (2.01 m)	200 lb (91 kg)	2008	Fairleigh	
(United States)	Jeremy Tyler	F/C	6 ft 10 in (2.08 m)	250 lb (113 kg)	2018	No information	

== More PBA imports lists ==
A–E | F–J | K–O | P–T | U–Z
