= List of Philippine Basketball Association imports (F–J) =

This is a list of imports who have played or currently playing in the Philippine Basketball Association.

^	Denotes player who won the PBA Best Import Award.
*	Denotes player who has been inducted to the PBA Hall of Fame.
†	Denotes player who has been inducted to the 40 Greatest Players in PBA History

== F ==
Nat.	Name	Pos.	Ht.	Wt.	Playing years	College/University	Ref.
(United States) (Belgium)	Marcus Faison	G/F	6 ft 5 in (1.96 m)	198 lb (90 kg)	2012	Siena	
(United States) (Lebanon)	Jarrid Famous	F/C	6 ft 11 in (2.11 m)	240 lb (109 kg)	2012; 2015; 2018	Westchester CC; Florida	
(United States)	Willie Farley	G/F	6 ft 4 in (1.93 m)	190 lb (86 kg)	2002	Chaffey; Fresno State	
(United States)	James Farr	F	6 ft 10 in (2.08 m)	247 lb (112 kg)	2019	Xavier	
(United States) (Japan)	Nick Fazekas	F/C	6 ft 11 in (2.11 m)	235 lb (107 kg)	2012	UN Reno	
(United States) (Belize)	Noel Felix	F	6 ft 9 in (2.06 m)	225 lb (102 kg)	2004–05	Fresno State	
(United States)	Courtney Fells	G	6 ft 5 in (1.96 m)	205 lb (93 kg)	2013	NC State	
(United States)	Andrew Fields	F/C	6 ft 8 in (2.03 m)	200 lb (91 kg)	1979–83	Cheyney	
(United States)	Kenny Fields	G	6 ft 6 in (1.98 m)	220 lb (100 kg)	1988	UCLA	
(United States)	Ronnie Fields	G	6 ft 3 in (1.91 m)	198 lb (90 kg)	1999	No information	
(United States)	Larry Fogle	G	6 ft 5 in (1.96 m)	205 lb (93 kg)	No information	UL Lafayette; Canisius	No information
(United States)	Isaac Fontaine	G	6 ft 4 in (1.93 m)	210 lb (95 kg)	2003	Washington State	
(Panama)	Gary Forbes	F	6 ft 7 in (2.01 m)	220 lb (100 kg)	2009	Virginia; UM Amherst	
(United States)	Sherell Ford	F	6 ft 7 in (2.01 m)	210 lb (95 kg)	2002	UI Chicago	
(United States)	Tremaine Fowlkes	F	6 ft 7 in (2.01 m)	212 lb (96 kg)	1999	UC Berkeley; Fresno State	
(United States)	Richie Frahm	G	6 ft 5 in (1.96 m)	210 lb (95 kg)	2002	Gonzaga	
(United States)	Gabe Freeman	F	6 ft 6 in (1.98 m)	205 lb (93 kg)	2009; 2012; 2014	Mesa CC	
(United States)	Kevin Freeman	F/C	6 ft 7 in (2.01 m)	235 lb (107 kg)	2001; 2006	Connecticut	
(United States)	Aaron Fuller	F	6 ft 6 in (1.98 m)	235 lb (107 kg)	2017–19	Iowa; Southern Cal	

== G ==
Nat.	Name	Pos.	Ht.	Wt.	Playing years	College/University	Ref.
(United States)	Kevin Gamble	G/F	6 ft 5 in (1.96 m)	210 lb (95 kg)	1988	Lincoln Illinois; Iowa	
(United States) (Belize)	Charles García	F	6 ft 10 in (2.08 m)	230 lb (104 kg)	2018	Riverside; Seattle	
(United States)	Alonzo Gee	G/F	6 ft 6 in (1.98 m)	220 lb (100 kg)	2019	Alabama	
(United States)	Derrick Gervin	F	6 ft 8 in (2.03 m)	200 lb (91 kg)	2018	UT San Antonio	
(United States)	Mike Gibson	F	6 ft 11 in (2.11 m)	205 lb (93 kg)	1982	USC Upstate	No information
(United States)	Augustus Gilchrist	F	6 ft 10 in (2.08 m)	240 lb (109 kg)	2016	South Florida	
(United States)	C. J. Giles	C	6 ft 11 in (2.11 m)	240 lb (109 kg)	2009	Kansas; Oregon State	
(United States)	Mike Glover	F	6 ft 5 in (1.96 m)	215 lb (98 kg)	2016; 2018	ASA; USU Eastern; Louisiana State	
(United States)	Zach Graham	G/F	6 ft 5 in (1.96 m)	210 lb (95 kg)	2012–13	Ole Miss	
(United States)	Ronnie Grandison	F	6 ft 6 in (1.98 m)	215 lb (98 kg)	1993	UC Irvine; New Orleans	
(Canada)	Stewart Granger	G	6 ft 3 in (1.91 m)	190 lb (86 kg)	No information	Villanova	
(United States)	Sylvester Gray	F	6 ft 6 in (1.98 m)	230 lb (104 kg)	1990; 1997	Memphis	
(United States) (Australia)	Al Green	G	6 ft 2 in (1.88 m)	172 lb (78 kg)	1981	AWC; NC State; Louisiana State	No information
(United States)	Sean Green	G	6 ft 5 in (1.96 m)	210 lb (95 kg)	1997	NC State; Iona	
(United States)	Donté Greene	F	6 ft 11 in (2.11 m)	226 lb (103 kg)	2017	Syracuse	
(United States)	Derek Grimm	F	6 ft 9 in (2.06 m)	230 lb (104 kg)	No information	Missouri	
(United States)	Anthony Grundy	G	6 ft 5 in (1.96 m)	185 lb (84 kg)	2011	NC State	

== H ==
Nat.	Name	Pos.	Ht.	Wt.	Playing years	College/University	Ref.
(United States)	Michael Hackett	F/C	6 ft 5 in (1.96 m)	210 lb (95 kg)	1986–88	Jacksonville	
(United States)	Glenn Hagan	G	6 ft 0 in (1.83 m)	170 lb (77 kg)	1982	St. Bonaventure	
(United States)	Darvin Ham	F	6 ft 6 in (1.98 m)	240 lb (109 kg)	2006	Texas Tech	
(United States)	Derrick Hamilton	F	6 ft 7 in (2.01 m)	225 lb (102 kg)	1990; 1997	Southern Miss	
(United States)	Stefhon Hannah	G	6 ft 1 in (1.85 m)	175 lb (79 kg)	2011	Chipola; Missouri	
(United States)	James Hardy	F/C	6 ft 8 in (2.03 m)	220 lb (100 kg)	1981	San Francisco	
(United States)	Jerome Harmon	G	6 ft 4 in (1.93 m)	199 lb (90 kg)	1992	Louisville	
(United States)	Justin Harper	F	6 ft 11 in (2.11 m)	225 lb (102 kg)	2017	Richmond	
(United States) (Finland)	Bernie Harris	F	6 ft 10 in (2.08 m)	200 lb (91 kg)	1978-79	VCU	
(United States)	Manny Harris	G	6 ft 5 in (1.96 m)	185 lb (84 kg)	2019	Michigan	
(United States)	Mike Harris	F	6 ft 6 in (1.98 m)	235 lb (107 kg)	2018; 2021–22	Rice	
(United States)	Paul Harris	F	6 ft 5 in (1.96 m)	230 lb (104 kg)	2011–12; 2014; 2016	Syracuse	
(United States)	Rufus Harris	F	6 ft 4 in (1.93 m)	190 lb (86 kg)	1986	Maine	No information
(United States)	Tony Harris	G	6 ft 3 in (1.91 m)	190 lb (86 kg)	1992-93; 1998	Lamar; Johnson CCC; New Orleans	
(United States)	Donnell Harvey	F	6 ft 8 in (2.03 m)	220 lb (100 kg)	2012–13	Florida	
(United States)	Shawn Harvey	G	6 ft 4 in (1.93 m)	180 lb (82 kg)	No information	Essex; WV State	No information
(United States)	Juaquin Hawkins	F	6 ft 7 in (2.01 m)	205 lb (93 kg)	2001	The Beach	
(United States) (Australia)	Butch Hays	G	6 ft 4 in (1.93 m)	196 lb (89 kg)	No information	UC Berkeley	
(United States)	David Henderson	G	6 ft 5 in (1.96 m)	195 lb (88 kg)	No information	Duke	No information
(United States)	Jerome Henderson	F/C	6 ft 11 in (2.11 m)	230 lb (104 kg)	No information	Wabash Valley; New Mexico	No information
(United States)	LaDontae Henton	F	6 ft 6 in (1.98 m)	215 lb (98 kg)	2016–17	Providence	
(United States)	Sean Higgins	F	6 ft 9 in (2.06 m)	240 lb (109 kg)	No information	Michigan	
(United States)	Herbert Hill	F/C	6 ft 10 in (2.08 m)	249 lb (113 kg)	2013	Providence	
(United States)	Malcolm Hill	F	6 ft 6 in (1.98 m)	220 lb (100 kg)	2017	UI Urbana–Champaign	
(United States)	Rico Hill	F	6 ft 7 in (2.01 m)	No information	2004–06	Illinois State	
(United States)	Darnell Hinson	G	6 ft 1 in (1.85 m)	185 lb (84 kg)	2011	Northeastern State	
(United States)	Jeff Hodge	G	6 ft 3 in (1.91 m)	175 lb (79 kg)	1990	South Alabama	
(United States) (Libya)	Randy Holcomb	F	6 ft 9 in (2.06 m)	225 lb (102 kg)	2002–04; 2008	Fresno State; Los Angeles CC; San Diego State	
(United States) (Puerto Rico)	John Holland	G/F	6 ft 5 in (1.96 m)	205 lb (93 kg)	2019	Boston	
(United States)	Murphy Holloway	F/C	6 ft 7 in (2.01 m)	240 lb (109 kg)	2017	Ole Miss	
(United States)	Michael Holton	G	6 ft 4 in (1.93 m)	185 lb (84 kg)	No information	UCLA	
(United States)	Jerald Honeycutt	F	6 ft 9 in (2.06 m)	245 lb (111 kg)	2002; 2005	Tulane	
(United States)	Steve Hood	G	6 ft 7 in (2.01 m)	185 lb (84 kg)	No information	Maryland; James Madison	No information
(United States)	Dennis Hopson	G/F	6 ft 5 in (1.96 m)	200 lb (91 kg)	1996	Ohio State	
(United States)	Franko House	F	6 ft 6 in (1.98 m)	248 lb (112 kg)	2019	Ball State	
(United States)	Byron Houston	F	6 ft 5 in (1.96 m)	250 lb (113 kg)	No information	Oklahoma State	
(United States)	Stephen Howard	F	6 ft 9 in (2.06 m)	225 lb (102 kg)	2000	DePaul	
(United States)	Richard Howell	F/C	6 ft 8 in (2.03 m)	250 lb (113 kg)	2014–15; 2019	NC State	
(United States)	Alfredrick Hughes	G/F	6 ft 5 in (1.96 m)	215 lb (98 kg)	1990	Loyola	

== I ==
Nat.	Name	Pos.	Ht.	Wt.	Playing years	College/University	Ref.
(United Kingdom) (Rwanda)	Prince Ibeh	C	6 ft 10 in (2.08 m)	243 lb (110 kg)	2019	UT Austin	
(United States)	Byron Irvin	G	6 ft 5 in (1.96 m)	190 lb (86 kg)	1994	Arkansas; Missouri	
(United States)	John Irving	F/C	6 ft 9 in (2.06 m)	215 lb (98 kg)	1977	Arizona; Hofstra	

== J ==
Nat.	Name	Pos.	Ht.	Wt.	Playing years	College/University	Ref.
(United States)	Darnell Jackson	F/C	6 ft 9 in (2.06 m)	253 lb (115 kg)	2014	Kansas	
(United States)	Justin Jackson	F/C	6 ft 9 in (2.06 m)	230 lb (104 kg)	2018	Cincinnati	
(United States)	Rick Jackson	F/C	6 ft 9 in (2.06 m)	235 lb (107 kg)	2015	Syracuse	
(United States)	Aaron James	F	6 ft 8 in (2.03 m)	210 lb (95 kg)	1980	Grambling	
(United States)	Damion James	F	6 ft 7 in (2.01 m)	235 lb (107 kg)	2015	UT Austin	
(United States) (Guyana)	Delroy James	F	6 ft 8 in (2.03 m)	232 lb (105 kg)	2019	Rhode Island	
(United States)	Henry James	F	6 ft 8 in (2.03 m)	220 lb (100 kg)	1996	South Plains; St. Mary's	
(United States)	Nate James	G/F	6 ft 6 in (1.98 m)	200 lb (91 kg)	2003	Duke	
(Iran)	Mohammad Jamshidi	G/F	6 ft 6 in (1.98 m)	200 lb (91 kg)	2016	No information	
(United States)	Othyus Jeffers	G/F	6 ft 5 in (1.96 m)	200 lb (91 kg)	2016	LA Southwest; UI Chicago; Robert Morris	
(United States)	Cory Jefferson	F	6 ft 9 in (2.06 m)	218 lb (99 kg)	2017	Baylor	
(United States)	Darryl Johnson	G	6 ft 1 in (1.85 m)	170 lb (77 kg)	1991	Michigan State	
(United States)	DerMarr Johnson	G/F	6 ft 9 in (2.06 m)	201 lb (91 kg)	2012	Cincinnati	
(United States)	Geron Johnson	G	6 ft 4 in (1.93 m)	202 lb (92 kg)	2017	Chipola; Garden City CC; Memphis	
(United States)	Ivan Johnson	F	6 ft 8 in (2.03 m)	255 lb (116 kg)	2015–16	Cisco; LA Southwest; Oregon; Cal State San Bernardino	
(United States)	Nate Johnson	F	6 ft 7 in (2.01 m)	215 lb (98 kg)	2001	Louisville	
(United States)	Orlando Johnson	G/F	6 ft 5 in (1.96 m)	220 lb (100 kg)	2015	Loyola Marymount; UC Santa Barbara	
(United States)	Reggie Johnson	C	6 ft 10 in (2.08 m)	290 lb (132 kg)	2018	Miami	
(United States)	Steffond Johnson	F	6 ft 8 in (2.03 m)	240 lb (109 kg)	No information	Louisiana State; San Diego State	No information
(United States) (Venezuela)	Askia Jones	G	6 ft 5 in (1.96 m)	200 lb (91 kg)	2001–02	Kansas State	
(United States)	Byron Jones	F	6 ft 8 in (2.03 m)	215 lb (98 kg)	1975–78; 1980–81	Selma; San Francisco	
(United States)	Danny Jones	F	6 ft 6 in (1.98 m)	245 lb (111 kg)	No information	UW Madison	No information
(United States)	Dwayne Jones	F	6 ft 11 in (2.11 m)	250 lb (113 kg)	2012	St. Joseph's	
(United States)	Greg Jones	G	6 ft 2 in (1.88 m)	190 lb (86 kg)	No information	West Virginia	No information
(United States)	Kevin Jones	F	6 ft 8 in (2.03 m)	255 lb (116 kg)	2014	West Virginia	
(United States)	Terrence Jones	F	6 ft 9 in (2.06 m)	255 lb (116 kg)	2019	Kentucky	
(Jamaica)	Jerome Jordan	C	7 ft 3 in (2.21 m)	253 lb (115 kg)	2013	Tulsa	
(United States)	Antoine Joubert	G	6 ft 5 in (1.96 m)	205 lb (93 kg)	No information	Michigan	

== More PBA imports lists ==
A–E | F–J | K–O | P–T | U–Z
