= List of Philippine Basketball Association imports (K–O) =

This is a list of imports who have played or currently playing in the Philippine Basketball Association.

^	Denotes player who won the PBA Best Import Award.
*	Denotes player who has been inducted to the PBA Hall of Fame.
	Denotes player who has been inducted to the 40 Greatest Players in PBA History

== K ==
Nat.	Name	Pos.	Ht.	Wt.	Playing years	College/University	Ref.
(United States)	Clarence Kea	F	6 ft 7 in (2.01 m)	218 lb (99 kg)	No information	Lamar	No information
(United States) (Venezuela)	Harold Keeling	G	6 ft 4 in (1.93 m)	185 lb (84 kg)	1986	Santa Clara	
(United States)	Jason Keep	C	6 ft 11 in (2.11 m)	280 lb (127 kg)	No information	North Idaho; OSU Stillwater; San Diego	No information
(United States)	Curtis Kelly	F/C	6 ft 10 in (2.08 m)	255 lb (116 kg)	2018	Connecticut; Kansas State	
(South Korea)	Kim Jiwan	G	6 ft 2 in (1.88 m)	180 lb (82 kg)	2015	Yonsei	
(United States)	Chris King	F	6 ft 8 in (2.03 m)	215 lb (98 kg)	1997–99	Wake Forest	
(United States)	Kirk King	F	6 ft 8 in (2.03 m)	240 lb (109 kg)	1998; 2000	Connecticut	
(United States)	Victor King	F	6 ft 9 in (2.06 m)	210 lb (95 kg)	1981	Louisiana Tech	
(United States)	Donnie Ray Koonce	G/F	6 ft 3 in (1.91 m)	190 lb (86 kg)	1982–83; 1986	UNC Charlotte	
(United States) (Palestine)	Omar Krayem	G	6 ft 0 in (1.83 m)	180 lb (82 kg)	2015	Lower Columbia; Eastern Washington; Cal Baptist	

== L ==
Nat.	Name	Pos.	Ht.	Wt.	Playing years	College/University	Ref.
(France) (Ivory Coast)	Hervé Lamizana	F/C	6 ft 10 in (2.08 m)	220 lb (100 kg)	2014	RU New Brunswick	
(United States)	Sean Lampley	F	6 ft 7 in (2.01 m)	227 lb (103 kg)	2005–06	UC Berkeley	
(United States)	Jerome Lane	F	6 ft 6 in (1.98 m)	230 lb (104 kg)	1994	Pittsburgh	No information
(United States)	Antonio Lang	F	6 ft 8 in (2.03 m)	205 lb (93 kg)	2001–02	Duke	
(United States) (Nigeria)	Gani Lawal	F/C	6 ft 9 in (2.06 m)	234 lb (106 kg)	2019	Georgia Tech	
(United States)	Edmund Lawrence	C	7 ft 0 in (2.13 m)	228 lb (103 kg)	1981	McNeese State	
(United States)	Clifford Lett	G	6 ft 3 in (1.91 m)	170 lb (77 kg)	1998	Florida	
(United States)	C. J. Leslie	F	6 ft 9 in (2.06 m)	205 lb (93 kg)	2015	NC State	
(United States)	Dana Lewis	C	6 ft 10 in (2.08 m)	240 lb (109 kg)	No information	Oral Roberts; Tulsa	
(United States)	Jai Lewis	F	6 ft 7 in (2.01 m)	275 lb (125 kg)	2009–10	George Mason	
(United States) (New Zealand)	Terrence Lewis	G/F	6 ft 4 in (1.93 m)	209 lb (95 kg)	1994	Howard; Washington State	No information
(United States)	Marcus Liberty	F	6 ft 8 in (2.03 m)	205 lb (93 kg)	2000	UI Urbana–Champaign	No information
(United States)	Mario Little	G/F	6 ft 6 in (1.98 m)	218 lb (99 kg)	2016	Chipola; Kansas	
(United States)	Lewis Lloyd	G/F	6 ft 6 in (1.98 m)	205 lb (93 kg)	1990-91	NMMI; Drake	
(United States)	Kayel Locke	F	6 ft 4 in (1.93 m)	240 lb (109 kg)	2019	UNC Greensboro	
(United States)	Art Long	F	6 ft 9 in (2.06 m)	250 lb (113 kg)	2004	Dodge City CC; Cincinnati; Southeastern CC	
(United States)	Dior Lowhorn	F	6 ft 7 in (2.01 m)	230 lb (104 kg)	2013–14; 2016	Texas Tech; San Francisco	

== M ==
Nat.	Name	Pos.	Ht.	Wt.	Playing years	College/University	Ref.
(United States)	Sam Mack	F	6 ft 7 in (2.01 m)	220 lb (100 kg)	1995	Iowa State; Tyler JC; Houston	No information
(United States)	Rudy Macklin	G/F	6 ft 7 in (2.01 m)	205 lb (93 kg)	No information	Louisiana State	No information
(United States)	Vernon Macklin	F/C	6 ft 10 in (2.08 m)	227 lb (103 kg)	2013; 2018	Georgetown; Florida	
(Syria)	Michael Madanly	G/F	6 ft 5 in (1.96 m)	198 lb (90 kg)	2015–16	No information	
(United States)	Cyrus Mann	C	6 ft 10 in (2.08 m)	230 lb (104 kg)	1976–79	Illinois State	
(United States)	Z. Mason	F/C	6 ft 6 in (1.98 m)	238 lb (108 kg)	2014	UT Chattanooga	
(United States)	Lew Massey	G/F	6 ft 5 in (1.96 m)	215 lb (98 kg)	1981–83	UNC Charlotte	
(United States)	Buster Matheney	F	6 ft 8 in (2.03 m)	212 lb (96 kg)	No information	Utah	No information
(United States)	Wes Matthews	G	6 ft 1 in (1.85 m)	170 lb (77 kg)	1991	UW Madison	
(United States)	Tharon Mayes	G	6 ft 3 in (1.91 m)	175 lb (79 kg)	1993; 1996	Florida State	No information
(United States) (Central African Republic)	James Mays	G/F	6 ft 7 in (2.01 m)	240 lb (109 kg)	2014	Clemson	
(Belgium) (Democratic Republic of the Congo)	D. J. Mbenga	C	7 ft 0 in (2.13 m)	245 lb (111 kg)	2013	No information	
(United States)	Tim McCalister	G	6 ft 4 in (1.93 m)	No information	1988	Oklahoma	No information
(United States)	Bob McCann	F	6 ft 6 in (1.98 m)	244 lb (111 kg)	1998	Upsala; Morehead State	No information
(United States)	Rashad McCants	G	6 ft 4 in (1.93 m)	207 lb (94 kg)	2012	UNC Chapel Hill	
(United States)	Amal McCaskill	C	6 ft 11 in (2.11 m)	235 lb (107 kg)	No information	Marquette	
(United States)	Dwayne McClain	F	6 ft 9 in (2.06 m)	185 lb (84 kg)	1991	Villanova	
(United States)	Paul McCracken	G	6 ft 4 in (1.93 m)	180 lb (82 kg)	1980	Los Angeles CC; Cal State Northridge	No information
(United States)	Chris McCullough	F	6 ft 9 in (2.06 m)	200 lb (91 kg)	2019	Syracuse	
(United States)	K. J. McDaniels	G/F	6 ft 6 in (1.98 m)	205 lb (93 kg)	2019	Clemson	
(United States)	Glenn McDonald	G/F	6 ft 6 in (1.98 m)	190 lb (86 kg)	1979–80	The Beach	
(United States)	Will McDonald	F/C	6 ft 11 in (2.11 m)	265 lb (120 kg)	2012	South Florida	
(United States)	Aaron McGhee	F	6 ft 8 in (2.03 m)	266 lb (121 kg)	2008	Cincinnati; Vincennes; Oklahoma	No information
(United States)	Jameel McKay	F/C	6 ft 9 in (2.06 m)	212 lb (96 kg)	2017	Indian Hills CC; Iowa State	
(United States)	Wendell McKines	F	6 ft 6 in (1.98 m)	230 lb (104 kg)	2013; 2015; 2017	NM State	
(Canada)	Liam McMorrow	C	7 ft 2 in (2.18 m)	275 lb (125 kg)	2015	Durham; Tennessee Tech	
(United States)	Larry McNeill	F/C	6 ft 9 in (2.06 m)	195 lb (88 kg)	1979	Marquette	
(United States)	Pete Mickeal	F	6 ft 7 in (2.01 m)	240 lb (109 kg)	2002	Indian Hills CC; Cincinnati	
(United States)	Elijah Millsap	G/F	6 ft 6 in (1.98 m)	215 lb (98 kg)	2013; 2016	UL Lafayette; UA Birmingham	
(United States)	Tony Mitchell	G/F	6 ft 6 in (1.98 m)	214 lb (97 kg)	2013	Alabama	
(United States)	Tony Mitchell	F	6 ft 8 in (2.03 m)	235 lb (107 kg)	2017; 2019	North Texas	
(United States)	Rodney Monroe	G	6 ft 3 in (1.91 m)	185 lb (84 kg)	No information	NC State	
(United States)	Gene Moore	C	6 ft 9 in (2.06 m)	225 lb (102 kg)	No information	Saint Louis	
(United States)	Otto Moore	F/C	6 ft 11 in (2.11 m)	205 lb (93 kg)	1979–80	UT Rio Grande	
(United States)	Chris Morris	F	6 ft 8 in (2.03 m)	210 lb (95 kg)	2002	Auburn	
(United States)	Mike Morrison	G	6 ft 4 in (1.93 m)	195 lb (88 kg)	1992–94	Loyola Maryland	
(United States)	John Morton	G	6 ft 3 in (1.91 m)	180 lb (82 kg)	1999-2000	Seton Hall	
(United States)	Richard Morton	G	6 ft 3 in (1.91 m)	190 lb (86 kg)	1990	Cal State Fullerton	
(United States)	Glenn Mosley	F	6 ft 8 in (2.03 m)	195 lb (88 kg)	1980	Seton Hall	No information
(United States)	Perry Moss	G	6 ft 2 in (1.88 m)	185 lb (84 kg)	1989	Northeastern	No information
(United States)	Terquin Mott	F/C	6 ft 8 in (2.03 m)	245 lb (111 kg)	1999	La Salle; Coppin State	
(United States)	Arnett Moultrie	F	6 ft 10 in (2.08 m)	249 lb (113 kg)	2018	UTEP; Mississippi State	
(United States)	Gabe Muoneke	G/F	6 ft 6 in (1.98 m)	No information	2002	UT Austin	
(United States)	Kevin Murphy	G	6 ft 4 in (1.93 m)	211 lb (96 kg)	2018	Tennessee Tech	

== N ==
Nat.	Name	Pos.	Ht.	Wt.	Playing years	College/University	Ref.
(Senegal)	Hamady N'Diaye	C	7 ft 0 in (2.13 m)	235 lb (107 kg)	2015	RU New Brunswick	
(United States)	David Noel	F	6 ft 6 in (1.98 m)	230 lb (104 kg)	2009	UNC Chapel Hill	
(Nigeria)	Julius Nwosu	F	6 ft 10 in (2.08 m)	255 lb (116 kg)	2002	Liberty	

== O ==
Nat.	Name	Pos.	Ht.	Wt.	Playing years	College/University	Ref.
(United States) (Central African Republic)	Patrick O'Bryant	C	7 ft 0 in (2.13 m)	250 lb (113 kg)	2015	Bradley	
(United States) (Nigeria)	Chamberlain Oguchi	G/F	6 ft 6 in (1.98 m)	200 lb (91 kg)	2011–12	Oregon; Illinois State	
(United States)	Cisco Oliver	G/F	6 ft 6 in (1.98 m)	210 lb (95 kg)	1975; 1976–78	Elizabeth State	
(United States)	Arinze Onuaku	C	6 ft 9 in (2.06 m)	275 lb (125 kg)	2016; 2018	Syracuse	
(United States)	Daniel Orton	F/C	6 ft 10 in (2.08 m)	265 lb (120 kg)	2015	Kentucky	

== More PBA imports lists ==
A–E | F–J | K–O | P–T | U–Z
