= 1981 YCO-Tanduay season =

- Head coach: Tito Eduque; Freddie Webb

Open Conference results
- Record: 1–17 (5.6%)
- Place: 10th
- Playoff finish: N/A

Reinforced Filipino results
- Record: 12–12 (50%)
- Place: 4th
- Playoff finish: Semifinals

YCO-Tanduay seasons

The 1981 YCO-Tanduay season was the 7th season of the franchise in the Philippine Basketball Association (PBA).

== Transactions ==
ADDITIONS
Chuck Barreiro, Chito Loyzaga (one game only) & Alex Marquez ^{Rookies signed from their farm team YCO Painters in the MICAA}
Rey Lazaro ^{Rookie, formerly of APCOR in the MICAA, started playing in the second conference}

== Summary ==
The two imports of Yco-Tanduay in the Open Conference are Lawyer "Boots" Taylor and Kenneth Austin. Taylor played only two games before being replaced by the comebacking veteran Eugene Moore. Austin played six games and was replaced by Mark Haymore. Yco-Tanduay lost their first 11 games of the season before they finally broke into win column with a 121–104 triumph over fellow tailender Presto Fun Drinks on May 16. Coach Tito Eduque was replaced by former Yco and Tanduay player Freddie Webb on the Esquires bench after 10 games.

In the Reinforced Filipino Conference, Yco-Tanduay signed up Russell Murray as their import and they were the third team to qualify in the round of six by posting a 5–4 won-loss card in the elimination phase. The Esquires enters the four-team semifinal round by ousting Open Conference champion Toyota Super Diesels, 124-118 on October 27. They lost to Presto Fun Drinks in their last semifinal outing on November 14. The winner of their do-or-die match would have advanced to the finals against U-Tex had Crispa Redmanizers lost to the Wranglers in the second game of the double-header.

== Win–loss record vs opponents ==
| Teams | Win | Loss | 1st (Open) | 2nd (RAF) |
| CDCP Road Builders | 1 | 2 | 0–2 | 1-0 |
| Crispa Redmanizers | 2 | 4 | 0–2 | 2-2 |
| Finance Funders | 0 | 3 | 0–2 | 0–1 |
| Gilbey’s Gin / St.George | 1 | 2 | 0–2 | 1-0 |
| Presto Fun Drinks | 3 | 7 | 1-1 | 2–6 |
| San Miguel Beermen | 1 | 2 | 0–2 | 1-0 |
| Tefilin Polyesters | 2 | 2 | 0–2 | 2-0 |
| Toyota Super Diesels | 1 | 3 | 0–2 | 1-1 |
| U-Tex Wranglers | 2 | 4 | 0–2 | 2-2 |
| Total | 13 | 29 | 1–17 | 12-12 |

== Awards ==
Russell Murray won best import honors in the Reinforced Filipino Conference and becomes the second recipient of the award.

== Roster ==
Yco-Tanduay roster
Players
Coaches

| Pos. | No. | Nat. | Name | Ht. | Wt. |
|---|---|---|---|---|---|---|
| F | 2 | (Philippines) | Abelardo Monzon | 6 ft 1 in (1.85 m) | | Letran |
| G | 4 | (Philippines) | Miguel Bilbao | 5 ft 9 in (1.75 m) | | De La Salle |
| G | 7 | (Philippines) | Roberto Dela Rosa | 5 ft 11 in (1.80 m) | | Far Eastern |
| G | 8 | (Philippines) | Alexander Marquez | 5 ft 9 in (1.75 m) | | De La Salle |
| F | 10 | (Philippines) | Victor Sanchez | 6 ft 3 in (1.91 m) | | Mapúa |
| G/F | 11 | (Philippines) | Jaime Manansala | 5 ft 11 in (1.80 m) | | UE |
| F | 12 | (Philippines) | Reynaldo Lazaro | 6 ft 1 in (1.85 m) | | Far Eastern |
| F | 13 | (Philippines) | Alberto Gutierrez | 6 ft 2 in (1.88 m) | | Ateneo de Davao |
| F | 14 | (Philippines) | Chito Loyzaga | 6 ft 2 in (1.88 m) | | San Beda |
| F/C | 15 | (Philippines) | Ely Capacio | 6 ft 4 in (1.93 m) |
| F | 16 | (Philippines) | Ricardo Cleofas | 5 ft 11 in (1.80 m) | | Ateneo |
| G | 17 | (Philippines) | Raymundo Barreiro | 5 ft 11 in (1.80 m) | | San Beda |
| C | 23 | (Philippines) | Rolando Evangelista | 6 ft 3 in (1.91 m) | | San Beda |
| F/C | 24 | (Philippines) | Nathaniel Castillo | 6 ft 2 in (1.88 m) | | Letran |
| G | 25 | (Philippines) | Rolando Pineda | 5 ft 9 in (1.75 m) | | UE |
| F/C | 32 | (United States) | Mark Haymore (I) | 6 ft 8 in (2.03 m) | | UMass |
| G/F | 33 | (United States) | Russell Murray (I) | 6 ft 3 in (1.91 m) | | Montana State Billings |
| C | 44 | (United States) | Lawyer Taylor (I) | 6 ft 10 in (2.08 m) |
| F/C | 50 | (United States) | Ken Austin (I) | 6 ft 8 in (2.03 m) | | Rice |
| C | 55 | (United States) | Gene Moore (I) | 6 ft 9 in (2.06 m) | | Saint Louis |

Head coach

- (Philippines) Valentin Eduque
- (Philippines) Freddie Webb

Assistant coach(es)

Legend

- (C) Team captain
- (I) Import
- Injured
