= 1981 CDCP Road Builders season =

- Head coach: Nic Jorge

Open Conference results
- Record: 10–8 (55.6%)
- Place: 6th
- Playoff finish: N/A

Reinforced Filipino results
- Record: 6–6 (50%)
- Place: 7th
- Playoff finish: N/A

CDCP Road Builders seasons

The 1981 CDCP Road Builders season was the 2nd and final season of the franchise in the Philippine Basketball Association (PBA).

== Colors ==
(dark)
(light)

== Summary ==
The Construction Development Corporation of the Philippines (CDCP), a company owned by Rodolfo Cuenca, assumed the PBA franchise of the Galleon Shippers (a CDCP affiliate) for the 1981 season. The team acquired Manny Paner from Presto and brought in 6-11 Edmund Lawrence and 6-9 James Lister (brother of Alton Lister) for the Open Conference, forming the tallest import combination in PBA history.

On March 10, 1981, CDCP won its first game of the season by limiting Presto to an all-time lowest output of 69 points in the 95–69 victory. After seven games in the elimination round, Lister was replaced by the returning NBA veteran Jeff Wilkins. The Road Builders were contending for one of the four semifinals berth and were a game behind the Toyota Superdiesels with one scheduled assignment left, but the Superdiesels won their last game against the Finance Funders to join U-Tex, San Miguel and Crispa in the semifinal round, thereby eliminating the Road Builders.

In the Reinforced Filipino Conference, CDCP paraded Ronald McCoy as their import, the Road Builders again fell short to advance into the next round, they won their last game against Presto Fun Drinks on October 8 for a 4-5 won-loss card but failed to create a tie with Tefilin, which secured the 6th and last spot in the round of six by winning over San Miguel Beermen two nights later.

CDCP equalled their overall record from last season with 16 wins and 14 losses in 30 games. The two-year ballclub disbanded before the start of the 1982 season.

== Win–loss record vs opponents ==
Teams	Win	Loss	1st (Open)	2nd (RAF)
Crispa Redmanizers	1	2	1-1	0-1
Finance Funders	4	0	2-0	2-0
Gilbey's Gin / St.George	3	1	1-1	2-0
Presto Fun Drinks	3	0	2-0	1-0
San Miguel Beermen	1	3	0-2	1-1
Tefilin Polyesters	1	2	1-1	0-1
Toyota Super Diesels	1	2	1-1	0-1
U-Tex Wranglers	0	3	0-2	0-1
YCO-Tanduay	2	1	2-0	0-1
Total	16	14	10-8	6-6

== Scoring record ==
September 26: Ronald McCoy scored 75 points in CDCP's 149-144 double overtime win over Finance, tying the record for most points set by Harry Rogers of 7-Up back in 1976.

== Roster ==
CDCP Road Builders roster
Players
Coaches

Pos.	No.	Nat.	Name	Ht.	Wt.
F/C	5	(Philippines)	Manny Paner	6 ft 2 in (1.88 m)		Visayas
F	8	(Philippines)	Renato Lobo	6 ft 2 in (1.88 m)		Far Eastern
F	9	(Philippines)	Anthony Dasalla	6 ft 3 in (1.91 m)		Far Eastern
G	10	(Philippines)	Robinson Obrique	5 ft 11 in (1.80 m)		PSBA
F	16	(Philippines)	Romulo Palijo	6 ft 0 in (1.83 m)		PSBA
G	17	(Philippines)	Joseph Herrera	6 ft 0 in (1.83 m)		Letran
F	19	(Philippines)	Gary Vargas	6 ft 2 in (1.88 m)		PSBA
F	27	(Philippines)	Nilo Cruz	6 ft 2 in (1.88 m)
G	21	(Philippines)	Lucrecio Dator	5 ft 11 in (1.80 m)		Southwestern-U
F	13	(Philippines)	Pablo Ocampo	6 ft 2 in (1.88 m)		San Beda
F	6	(Philippines)	Jose Rillo	6 ft 2 in (1.88 m)		PSBA
C	44	(United States)	Jeff Wilkins (I)	7 ft 0 in (2.13 m)		Illinois State
C	21	(United States)	James Lister (I)	6 ft 9 in (2.06 m)		Arizona State
C	45	(United States)	Edmund Lawrence (I)	6 ft 11 in (2.11 m)		McNeese State
F	20	(United States)	Ronald McCoy (I)	6 ft 5 in (1.96 m)		Western Washington

Head coach

- (Philippines) Nic Jorge

Assistant coach(es)

Legend

- (C) Team captain
- (I) Import
- Injured
