= 1981 St. George Whiskies season =

- Head coach: Nemie Villegas
- Owner(s): La Tondeña Incorporada

Open Conference results
- Record: 7–11 (38.9%)
- Place: 7th
- Playoff finish: N/A

Reinforced Filipino results
- Record: 1–11 (8.3%)
- Place: 10th
- Playoff finish: N/A

St. George Whiskies seasons

The 1981 St. George Whiskies season was the 3rd season of the franchise in the Philippine Basketball Association (PBA). The team were known as Gilbey's Gin in the Open Conference.

== Transactions ==
ADDITIONS
Aurelio Clariño ^{Acquired from Presto during the off-season}
Angelito Ladores ^{Acquired from Galleon during the off-season}
Eduardo Ducut and Romeo Valenzuela ^{Rookies signed}
Alex Clariño ^{Rookie, started playing in the 2nd Conference}

== Imports ==
The high-scoring Larry McNeill return for the third straight season with Gilbey's in the Open Conference and along with Dean Tolson, who was also back when he first played together with McNeill as imports for the La Tondeña ballclub in its maiden year in 1979.

In the Reinforced Filipino Conference, the team signed up Kenny Tyler as their import. Tyler played for the visiting Nicholas Stoodley squad from United States that won the Invitational championship last season.

== Win–loss record vs opponents ==
Teams	Win	Loss	1st (Open)	2nd (RAF)
CDCP Road Builders	1	3	1-1	0–2
Crispa Redmanizers	1	2	1-1	0–1
Finance Funders	0	4	0–2	0–2
Presto Fun Drinks	1	2	1-1	0–1
San Miguel Beermen	1	3	0–2	1-1
Tefilin Polyesters	2	1	2-0	0–1
Toyota Super Diesels	0	3	0–2	0–1
U-Tex Wranglers	0	3	0–2	0–1
YCO-Tanduay	2	1	2-0	0–1
Total	8	22	7–11	1–11

== Roster ==
1981 St. George Whiskies roster
Players

Pos.	#	POB	Name	Height	Weight	DOB (YYYY–MM–DD)	From
F	3	(Philippines)	Norberto Rivera	5 ft 11 in (1.80 m)			San Sebastian
F	6	(Philippines)	Romeo Valenzuela	6 ft 2 in (1.88 m)			Letran
G	7	(Philippines)	Armando Torres	6 ft 1 in (1.85 m)			FEATI
F	8	(Philippines)	Marlowe Jacutin	6 ft 0 in (1.83 m)			Visayas
C	10	(Philippines)	Eduardo Ducut	6 ft 5 in (1.96 m)			Letran
F/C	15	(Philippines)	Alex Clariño	6 ft 2 in (1.88 m)			Lyceum
F/C	18	(Philippines)	Eusebio Del Rosario	6 ft 2 in (1.88 m)			UE
G	19	(Philippines)	Wilfredo Tanduyan	5 ft 10 in (1.78 m)			Southwestern-U
C	23	(Philippines)	Aurelio Clariño	6 ft 2 in (1.88 m)			Adamson
G	24	(Philippines)	Wilfredo Generalao	5 ft 8 in (1.73 m)			Visayas
G	30	(Philippines)	Javier Garcia	5 ft 9 in (1.75 m)			Adamson
G/F	44	(Philippines)	Angelito Ladores	5 ft 11 in (1.80 m)			JRC
C	31	(United States)	Larry McNeill (I)	6 ft 9 in (2.06 m)			Marquette
F/C	32	(United States)	Dean Tolson (I)	6 ft 8 in (2.03 m)			Arkansas
G	22	(United States)	Kenny Tyler (I)	6 ft 1 in (1.85 m)			Gonzaga

Coaches

Head coach

- (Philippines) Nemie Villegas

Assistant coach(es)

Legend

- (C) Team captain
- (I) Import
- Injured
