= 1981 Presto Fun Drinks season =

- Head coach: Jimmy Mariano
- Owner(s): CFC Corporation

Open Conference results
- Record: 4–14 (22.2%)
- Place: 9th
- Playoff finish: N/A

Reinforced Filipino results
- Record: 13–12 (52%)
- Place: 3rd
- Playoff finish: Semifinals

Presto Fun Drinks seasons

The 1981 Presto Fun Drinks season was the 7th season of the franchise in the Philippine Basketball Association (PBA).

== Transactions ==
ADDITIONS
Bienvenido dela Cruz ^{Acquired from Gilbey's Gin}
Filomeno Gulfin ^{Acquired from Crispa}
Larry Mumar ^{Acquired from Galleon}

Rookies	Signed	Last MICAA team
Woodrow Jaymalin	Off-season	Presto
Ricardo Roces	Off-season	Presto
Rafael Sison	Off-season	Presto
Joey Marquez	Off-season	Solidenims
Joel Banal	August 1981	Presto
Eddie Mendoza	August 1981	Presto
Jose Roslin	August 1981	Presto
Manny Victorino	August 1981	Presto

== Summary ==
Jimmy Mariano takes over from fellow olympian Alfonso "Boy" Marquez on the Presto bench at the start of the season. The Presto Fun Drinkers had a pair of Harold Johnson and Myles Patrick for their imports in the Open Conference. After two games, Patrick was replaced by Earl Tatum, who played four games before getting injured and left without any replacement.

The handicap ruling favored the team in the Reinforced Filipino Conference as the Fun Drinkers enlisted the services of Lew Massey, often called "Sweet Lew", Massey is a prolific scoring machine from North Carolina State and the second round pick of the Los Angeles Lakers in the 1978 NBA Draft.

The Fun Drinkers enters the quarterfinal phase of the Reinforced Filipino Conference with a 5–4 won-loss slate. Presto made it to the semifinal round along with Crispa, U-Tex and Yco-Tanduay by winning three of their five outings in the round of six.

On the last playing date of the semifinals on November 14, the Fun Drinkers beat Yco-Tanduay, 121–114, to finish with three wins and three losses and tied with Crispa, which beat first finalist U-Tex in the nightcap. The CFC ballclub lost to the Redmanizers, 114–119, in the playoff game on November 17 in their closest bid to advance in the championship for the first time.

== Win–loss record vs opponents ==
Teams	Win	Loss	1st (Open)	2nd (RAF)
CDCP Road Builders	0	3	0–2	0–1
Crispa Redmanizers	1	6	0–2	1–4
Finance Funders	1	2	1-1	0–1
Gilbey's Gin / St.George	2	1	1-1	1-0
San Miguel Beermen	1	2	0–2	1-0
Tefilin Polyesters	2	2	0–2	2-0
Toyota Super Diesels	1	3	1-1	0–2
U-Tex Wranglers	2	4	0–2	2-2
YCO-Tanduay	7	3	1-1	6-2
Total	17	26	4–14	13-12

== Awards ==
Rafael "Cho" Sison was voted the season's Rookie of the year.

== Roster ==
Presto Fun Drinks roster
Players
Coaches

Pos.	No.	Nat.	Name	Ht.	Wt.
C	1	(Philippines)	Manny Victorino	6 ft 5 in (1.96 m)		José Rizal
G/F	5	(Philippines)	Woodrow Jaymalin	5 ft 10 in (1.78 m)		Philippine Christian
F	6	(Philippines)	Ernesto Estrada	5 ft 11 in (1.80 m)		Visayas
G	7	(Philippines)	Lawrence Mumar	5 ft 11 in (1.80 m)		UST
F	8	(Philippines)	Jacinto Chua	6 ft 0 in (1.83 m)		Far Eastern
G	9	(Philippines)	Bienvenido Dela Cruz	6 ft 2 in (1.88 m)
G	10	(Philippines)	Eduardo Mendoza	6 ft 0 in (1.83 m)		Visayas
F/C	11	(Philippines)	Florendo Ritualo	6 ft 3 in (1.91 m)		Baguio
G	12	(Philippines)	Rafael Sison	6 ft 1 in (1.85 m)		Ateneo de Davao
G	14	(Philippines)	Danilo Basilan	5 ft 9 in (1.75 m)		Southwestern-U
G	15	(Philippines)	Ricardo Roces	6 ft 2 in (1.88 m)		Mapúa
F	19−14	(Philippines)	Jose Roslin	6 ft 2 in (1.88 m)		PCCr
G	20	(Philippines)	Reynaldo Franco	5 ft 9 in (1.75 m)		UE
F	22−8	(Philippines)	Filomeno Gulfin	6 ft 2 in (1.88 m)		Southwestern-U
F/C	26	(Philippines)	Joel Banal	6 ft 4 in (1.93 m)		Mapúa
F	66	(Philippines)	Joey Marquez	6 ft 2 in (1.88 m)		Angeles
F	33	(United States)	Harold Johnson (I)	6 ft 5 in (1.96 m)
F/C	32	(United States)	Myles Patrick (I)	6 ft 8 in (2.03 m)		Auburn
F	43	(United States)	Earl Tatum (I)	6 ft 4 in (1.93 m)		Marquette
F	23	(United States)	Lew Massey (I)	6 ft 5 in (1.96 m)		Charlotte

Head coach

- (Philippines) Jimmy Mariano

Assistant coach(es)

Legend

- (C) Team captain
- (I) Import
- Injured
