= 1981 Crispa Redmanizers season =

- Head coach: Baby Dalupan
- Owner(s): P. Floro and Sons, Inc.

Open Conference results
- Record: 19–10 (65.5%)
- Place: 2nd
- Playoff finish: Runner-up

Reinforced Filipino results
- Record: 17–8 (68%)
- Place: 1st
- Playoff finish: Champion

Crispa Redmanizers seasons

The 1981 Crispa Redmanizers season was the 7th season of the franchise in the Philippine Basketball Association (PBA).

== Colors ==
Crispa Redmanizers (Open Conference)
(dark)
(light)
(alternate)
Crispa Redmanizers (Reinforced All-Filipino Conference)
(dark)
(light)

== Transactions ==
During the Reinforced Filipino Conference, the Crispa Redmanizers recruited and signed four players from the Multi-titled APCOR ballclub in the MICAA namely; Ramon Cruz, Arturo Cristobal, Padim Israel and Elpidio Villamin, a fifth recruit from the amateurs was Rudy Distrito.

With the Entry of former APCOR players, four players from Crispa who were part of the Open Conference lineup that lost to Toyota were dropped from the rosters; Virgilio Dela Cruz, Tito Varela, Jaime Javier and Gregorio Dionisio.

== Summary ==
Byron "Snake" Jones is playing in his sixth PBA season and will be returning for the Redmanizers in the Open Conference after seeing action for Crispa in the short Invitational Championship last year. Jones' partner is 6-8 James Hardy, a first round pick of the New Orleans Jazz in the NBA.

Crispa won their first game of the season on March 8 against rival Toyota Super Diesels, 112-97, spoiling the debut of new Toyota coach Ed Ocampo. The Redmanizers placed second in the team standings with 13 wins and five losses, a game behind San Miguel Beermen and U-Tex Wranglers after 18 games in the elimination round. In the semifinals, Crispa and Toyota arranged a title showdown as they raced to a similar 4–1 win–loss slates as opposed to U-Tex and San Miguel's 1-4 card with still one scheduled game left in the semifinal round.

Crispa was a slight favorite to win the championship for having beaten the Super Diesels in three of their four previous meetings. The Redmanizers lost the first game of the series but scored back-to-back victories in Games two and three for a 2–1 lead and a win away from clinching the crown. Toyota came back to win the last two games of the best-of-five finals series and take home the Open Conference title.

In the Reinforced Filipino Conference, the Redmanizers paraded 6–1 Allan Green as their import. Crispa were tied with Toyota at first place with seven wins and two losses after the one-round elimination phase and advances into the semifinals by posting a 3-2 win-loss card in the round of six. In the semifinal round, the Redmanizers had to win two of their last three matches in the second round to force a playoff with Presto Fun Drinks for the second finals berth and the right to play U-Tex, which booked the first finals seat. Crispa defeated Presto, 119-114 on November 17, to arrange a titular showdown with the Wranglers. The Redmanizers won their 9th PBA title with a 3-1 series victory over U-Tex.

== Win–loss record vs opponents ==
Teams	Win	Loss	1st (Open)	2nd (RAF)
CDCP Road Builders	2	1	1-1	1-0
Finance Funders	3	0	2-0	1-0
Gilbey’s Gin / St.George	2	1	1-1	1-0
Presto Fun Drinks	6	1	2-0	4-1
San Miguel Beermen	4	1	3-1	1-0
Tefilin Polyesters	4	0	2-0	2-0
Toyota Super Diesels	6	5	5-4	1-1
U-Tex Wranglers	5	7	1-3	4-4
YCO-Tanduay	4	2	2-0	2-2
Total	36	18	19-10	17-8

== Open Conference roster ==
Crispa Redmanizers roster
Players
Coaches

Pos.	No.	Nat.	Name	Ht.	Wt.
C	5	(Philippines)	Abet Guidaben	6 ft 5 in (1.96 m)		USJ-R
G	6	(Philippines)	Fortunato Co, Jr	6 ft 1 in (1.85 m)		Mapúa
C	8	(Philippines)	Jaime Javier	6 ft 5 in (1.96 m)		José Rizal
G	9	(Philippines)	Gregorio Dionisio	5 ft 9 in (1.75 m)		Adamson
G/F	10	(Philippines)	Freddie Hubalde	6 ft 1 in (1.85 m)		Mapúa
F/C	11	(United States)	James Hardy (I)	6 ft 8 in (2.03 m)		San Francisco
G/F	12	(Philippines)	Virgilio Dela Cruz	6 ft 3 in (1.91 m)		Mapúa
G	14	(Philippines)	Tito Varela	6 ft 1 in (1.85 m)		UE
G	15	(Philippines)	Bernie Fabiosa	5 ft 9 in (1.75 m)		UE
G	16	(Philippines)	Frank Natividad	6 ft 1 in (1.85 m)		UST
C	17	(Philippines)	Romulo Mamaril	6 ft 6 in (1.98 m)		Mapúa
F	18	(Philippines)	Philip Cezar	6 ft 3 in (1.91 m)		José Rizal
F	20	(Philippines)	Bernardo Carpio	6 ft 3 in (1.91 m)		Ateneo
C	33	(United States)	Byron Jones (I)	6 ft 9 in (2.06 m)		San Francisco

Head coach

- (Philippines) Baby Dalupan

Assistant coach(es)

Legend

- (C) Team captain
- (I) Import
- Injured

== Reinforced All-Filipino Conference roster ==
Crispa Redmanizers roster
Players
Coaches

Pos.	No.	Nat.	Name	Ht.	Wt.
C	5	(Philippines)	Abet Guidaben	6 ft 5 in (1.96 m)		USJ-R
G	6	(Philippines)	Fortunato Co, Jr	6 ft 1 in (1.85 m)		Mapúa
G	8 & 7	(Philippines)	Arturo Cristobal	6 ft 1 in (1.85 m)		Far Eastern
F	9	(Philippines)	Padim Israel	6 ft 2 in (1.88 m)		Ateneo
G/F	10	(Philippines)	Freddie Hubalde	6 ft 1 in (1.85 m)		Mapúa
G/F	11	(United States)	Allan Green (I)	6 ft 1 in (1.85 m)		LSU
F	13	(Philippines)	Elpidio Villamin	6 ft 2 in (1.88 m)
G	14 & 4	(Philippines)	Ramon Cruz	5 ft 11 in (1.80 m)		UE
G	15	(Philippines)	Bernie Fabiosa	5 ft 9 in (1.75 m)		UE
C	17	(Philippines)	Romulo Mamaril	6 ft 6 in (1.98 m)		Mapúa
F	18	(Philippines)	Philip Cezar	6 ft 3 in (1.91 m)		José Rizal
G	19	(Philippines)	Rudy Distrito	5 ft 11 in (1.80 m)		UE
F	23	(Philippines)	Bernardo Carpio	6 ft 3 in (1.91 m)		Ateneo

Head coach

- (Philippines) Baby Dalupan

Assistant coach(es)

Legend

- (C) Team captain
- (I) Import
- Injured

^{Note: The four players released after the Open Conference upon the acquisition of five new recruits, may have played a couple of games in the Reinforced All-Filipino but were no longer part of the championship roster.}
