= Irv Chatman =

Irv Chatman was a former professional basketball player. He was considered among the top collegiate player in the New York State area as a Queens August Martin High School senior in 1974-1975. Prior to enrolling as a freshman in the University of Tennessee of Knoxville, Chatman was selected for the outstanding player award at a metropolitan five-star camp. He transferred to the University of Rhode Island at Kingston and attained eligibility in early February 1977, averaging 6.1 points and 5.9 rebounds in seven contests for coach Jack Kraft.

Chatman was not drafted in the NBA but was offered a non-guaranteed pact to play for the New Jersey Nets in the 1979-80 NBA season. He opted to take Crispa Redmanizers' offer to perform in the Philippine Basketball Association instead.
