= Victor King =

American basketball player

Personal information
- Born: July 16, 1957 (age 69) Newellton, Louisiana, U.S.
- Listed height: 6 ft 9 in (2.06 m)
- Listed weight: 210 lb (95 kg)

Career information
- College: Louisiana Tech (1975–1979)
- NBA draft: 1979: 2nd round, 39th overall pick
- Drafted by: Los Angeles Lakers
- Position: Power forward

Career history
- 1980–1981: Maine Lumberjacks
- 1981: Toyota Super Diesels

Career highlights
- PBA champion (1981 Open)
- Stats at Basketball Reference

Victor Bernard King (born July 16, 1957) is an American former professional basketball player. He played collegiately for the Louisiana Tech Bulldogs, where he was a four-year starter and two-time All-Southland Conference selection during his final two seasons. He was selected by the Los Angeles Lakers as the 39th overall pick in the 1979 NBA draft but never played in the National Basketball Association (NBA).

King played for the Maine Lumberjacks of the Continental Basketball Association (CBA) during the 1980–81 season. He played alongside fellow 1979 draftee Andrew Fields for the Toyota Super Diesels of the Philippine Basketball Association (PBA) during the 1981 season, winning the Open Conference championship. King also played in Europe.

Two of King's sons, Bernard King and Kourtney Roberson, are professional basketball players.

== Career statistics ==
Legend
GP	Games played	GS	Games started	MPG	Minutes per game
FG%	Field goal percentage	3P%	3-point field goal percentage	FT%	Free throw percentage
RPG	Rebounds per game	APG	Assists per game	SPG	Steals per game
BPG	Blocks per game	PPG	Points per game	**Bold**	Career high

=== College ===
Year	Team	GP	GS	MPG	FG%	3P%	FT%	RPG	APG	SPG	BPG	PPG
1975–76	Louisiana Tech	**26**	–	–	.543	–	.653	5.7	–	–	–	9.7
1976–77	Louisiana Tech	**26**	–	–	.585	–	.685	5.7	.8	.2	.4	11.6
1977–78	Louisiana Tech	21	–	–	.533	–	.684	**7.9**	**.8**	**.5**	**.6**	17.0
1978–79	Louisiana Tech	25	–	–	**.622**	–	**.717**	6.6	–	–	–	**20.4**
Career		98	–	–	.574	–	.693	6.4	.8	.3	.5	14.5
