= 1981 San Miguel Beermen season =

- Head coach: Tommy Manotoc
- Owner(s): San Miguel Corporation

Open Conference results
- Record: 17–12 (58.6%)
- Place: 4th
- Playoff finish: Semifinals

Reinforced Filipino results
- Record: 5–7 (41.7%)
- Place: 8th
- Playoff finish: N/A

San Miguel Beermen seasons

The 1981 San Miguel Beermen season was the 7th season of the franchise in the Philippine Basketball Association (PBA).

== Transactions ==
ADDITIONS
Alex Tan and Eduardo Dizon ^{Rookies signed, played for San Miguel's farm team in the MICAA}
Raymundo Obias ^{Rookie signed, formerly of Solidenims and Jag Jeans in the MICAA, started playing in the 2nd Conference}

== Summary ==
Former U-Tex coach Tommy Manotoc will now be the new head coach of San Miguel Beermen, Manotoc replaces Edgardo Ocampo, who transferred to Toyota Super Diesels at the beginning of the season.

The Beermen had two returning imports for the Open Conference, Aaron James and James Robinson, both former U-Tex Wranglers under coach Tommy Manotoc. James was part of the champion team from last season while Robinson played for U-Tex in 1979.

After topping the elimination phase in a tie with U-Tex for the best record of 14 wins and four losses in the Open Conference, the Beermen went down at the bottom of the four-team semifinals with one victory against five defeats. They lost to U-Tex, three games to two, in the series for third place.

In the Reinforced Filipino Conference, San Miguel's import Bobby Turner played three games and was replaced by Ron Roberson, who played for the Beermen in the rest of their remaining assignments, including the round-robin among the four teams that didn't advance in the round of six.

== Win–loss record vs opponents ==
Teams	Win	Loss	1st (Open)	2nd (RAF)
CDCP Road Builders	3	1	2-0	1-1
Crispa Redmanizers	1	4	1–3	0–1
Finance Funders	4	0	2-0	2-0
Gilbey's Gin / St.George	3	1	2-0	1-1
Presto Fun Drinks	2	1	2-0	0–1
Tefilin Polyesters	1	2	1-1	0–1
Toyota Super Diesels	2	3	1–3	1-0
U-Tex Wranglers	4	6	4–5	0–1
YCO-Tanduay	2	1	2-0	0–1
Total	22	19	17-12	5–7

== Roster ==
1981 San Miguel Beermen roster
Players

Pos.	#	POB	Name	Height	Weight	DOB (YYYY–MM–DD)	From
G	4	(Philippines)	Alex Tan	6 ft 1 in (1.85 m)			UE
F/C	5	(Philippines)	Jesus Migalbin	6 ft 3 in (1.91 m)			San Agustin
G/F	6	(Philippines)	Biboy Ravanes	6 ft 1 in (1.85 m)			Cebu
G	7	(Philippines)	Antonio Torrente	6 ft 1 in (1.85 m)
F/C	9	(Philippines)	Eduardo Dizon	6 ft 2 in (1.88 m)			José Rizal
F	11	(Philippines)	Salvador Ramas	6 ft 1 in (1.85 m)			Cebu
G	12	(Philippines)	Danilo Salvador	5 ft 9 in (1.75 m)			San Sebastian
G	14	(Philippines)	Yoyong Martirez	5 ft 8 in (1.73 m)			Southwestern-U
F/C	15	(Philippines)	Rodolfo Lalota	6 ft 3 in (1.91 m)			Mapúa
G	16	(Philippines)	Leonardo Paguntalan	6 ft 1 in (1.85 m)			Western Institute
F	17	(Philippines)	Evalson Valencia	6 ft 1 in (1.85 m)			Western Institute
G	19	(Philippines)	Benjamin Chua	5 ft 10 in (1.78 m)			UE
G/F	22	(Philippines)	Ray Obias	5 ft 11 in (1.80 m)			UST
F	21	(United States)	James Robinson (I)	6 ft 7 in (2.01 m)			Fresno State
F/C	23	(United States)	Aaron James (I)	6 ft 8 in (2.03 m)			Grambling State
G	25	(United States)	Bobby Turner (I)	6 ft 3 in (1.91 m)			Louisville
G	21	(United States)	Roderick Roberson (I)	6 ft 3 in (1.91 m)

Coaches

Head coach

- (Philippines) Tommy Manotoc

Assistant coach(es)

Legend

- (C) Team captain
- (I) Import
- Injured
