= Bobby Allen (basketball) =

Canadian basketball player

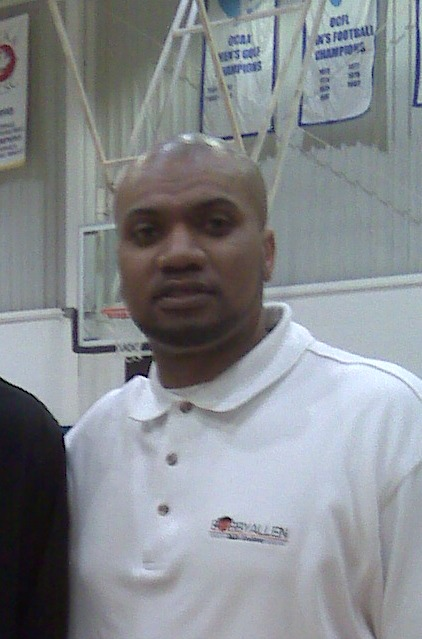

Personal information
- Born: May 12, 1969 (age 57)
- Listed height: 6 ft 3 in (1.91 m)
- Listed weight: 215 lb (98 kg)

Career information
- High school: Morningstar Secondary (Malton, Ontario)
- College: Spoon River CC (1990–1992); Texas–Pan American (1993–1994)
- NBA draft: 1994: undrafted
- Position: Point guard / shooting guard
- Number: 4, 44

Career history
- 1995: Sta. Lucia Realtors
- 1997: Sagesse
- 1998: Sta. Lucia Realtors
- 2000: Pelita Jaya
- 2001: Madrid
- 2003: PAO Panathinaikos Limassol

Robert Allen (born May 12, 1969) is a Canadian retired professional basketball player.

Allen was a 6 ft 3 in (1.91 m) point guard and shooting guard at Morningstar Secondary School in Malton, Ontario, where he averaged close to 50 points per game.

Allen was rated top 2 in Canada high school basketball in 1990 and also went on to become a two-time (JUCO) Junior College All American.

Allen played junior college basketball at Spoon River College, where he averaged 29 points, 8 rebounds and 6 assists and then played at Texas Pan American University, where he averaged 17 points and 6 rebounds. After his college years Allen was inducted into the (JUCO) Junior College Hall of Fame on October 8, 2011.

Allen also played on the Canadian men's national basketball team and was the leading scorer in the 1994–1995 season.
