= List of Philippine Basketball Association imports (U–Z) =

This is a list of imports who have played or currently playing in the Philippine Basketball Association.

^	Denotes player who won the PBA Best Import Award.
*	Denotes player who has been inducted to the PBA Hall of Fame.
†	Denotes player who has been inducted to the 40 Greatest Players in PBA History

== U ==
Nat.	Name	Pos.	Ht.	Wt.	Playing years	College/University	Ref.
(United States)	Kelvin Upshaw	G	6 ft 2 in (1.88 m)	180 lb (82 kg)	1991–92	Oklahoma A&M; Utah	

== V ==
Nat.	Name	Pos.	Ht.	Wt.	Playing years	College/University	Ref.
(Nigeria)	Jeff Varem	F	6 ft 6 in (1.98 m)	245 lb (111 kg)	2006	Vincennes; Washington State	
(United States) (Lebanon)	Jackson Vroman	F/C	6 ft 10 in (2.08 m)	220 lb (100 kg)	2012	Snow; Iowa State	

== W ==
Nat.	Name	Pos.	Ht.	Wt.	Playing years	College/University	Ref.
(United States)	Lorrenzo Wade	G/F	6 ft 6 in (1.98 m)	226 lb (103 kg)	2010	Louisville; San Diego State	
(United States)	Henry Walker	G/F	6 ft 6 in (1.98 m)	220 lb (100 kg)	2014; 2016–18	Kansas State	
(United States)	Jermaine Walker	F	6 ft 6 in (1.98 m)	225 lb (102 kg)	2002	Miami	
(United States)	Jamie Waller	F	6 ft 4 in (1.93 m)	215 lb (98 kg)	1988; 1992	Virginia Union	
(United States)	Jerod Ward	F/C	6 ft 9 in (2.06 m)	235 lb (107 kg)	2001	Michigan	
(United States)	Joe Ward	F	6 ft 6 in (1.98 m)	210 lb (95 kg)	1988	Clemson; Georgia	
(United States)	Cornell Warner	F/C	6 ft 9 in (2.06 m)	220 lb (100 kg)	1978	Jackson State	No information
(United States)	Jameel Watkins	F/C	6 ft 10 in (2.08 m)	255 lb (116 kg)	2004; 2008	Georgetown	
(United States) (Israel)	Terrence Watson	F	6 ft 7 in (2.01 m)	220 lb (100 kg)	2017–18	Mott CC; Ole Miss; Ball State	
(United States)	Justin Watts	G/F	6 ft 5 in (1.96 m)	210 lb (95 kg)	2019	UNC Chapel Hill	
(United States)	Sedric Webber	F	6 ft 6 in (1.98 m)	200 lb (91 kg)	2002	Charleston	
(United States)	Bubba Wells	F	6 ft 5 in (1.96 m)	230 lb (104 kg)	2002–2004	Austin Peay State	
(United States)	Dez Wells	G/F	6 ft 4 in (1.93 m)	215 lb (98 kg)	2019	Xavier; Maryland	
(United States)	Mario West	G/F	6 ft 5 in (1.96 m)	210 lb (95 kg)	2012	Georgia Tech	
(United States)	Ennis Whatley	G	6 ft 3 in (1.91 m)	177 lb (80 kg)	1989-90	Alabama	
(United States)	Clinton Wheeler	G	6 ft 1 in (1.85 m)	185 lb (84 kg)	No information	William Paterson	
(United States)	Leonard White	F	6 ft 5 in (1.96 m)	215 lb (98 kg)	2002	Faulkner State; Southern	
(United States)	Rodney White	F	6 ft 9 in (2.06 m)	240 lb (109 kg)	2012–13	UNC Charlotte	
(United States)	Tony White	G	6 ft 2 in (1.88 m)	170 lb (77 kg)	No information	Tennessee	
(United States)	Willie White	G	6 ft 3 in (1.91 m)	195 lb (88 kg)	No information	UT Chattanooga	
(United States)	Mitchell Wiggins	G	6 ft 4 in (1.93 m)	185 lb (84 kg)	1994	Truett McConnell; Clemson; Florida State	
(United States)	Tyler Wilkerson	F	6 ft 8 in (2.03 m)8th	240 lb (109 kg)	2016	Marshall	
(United States)	Jeff Wilkins	F/C	6 ft 11 in (2.11 m)8th	230 lb (104 kg)	1980–81	Black Hawk; Illinois State	
(United States)	Chris Williams	F	6 ft 6 in (1.98 m)	No information	2009	Virginia	No information
(United States)	Donald Williams	G	6 ft 3 in (1.91 m)	No information	1998–99	UNC Chapel Hill	
(United States)	Freeman Williams	G/F	6 ft 4 in (1.93 m)	190 lb (86 kg)	1987	Portland State	
(United States)	Hank Williams	F	6 ft 5 in (1.96 m)	210 lb (95 kg)	No information	Jacksonville	No information
(United States)	Justin Williams	F/C	6 ft 11 in (2.11 m)	260 lb (118 kg)	2013	Colby CC; Wyoming	
(United States)	Kevin Williams	G	6 ft 2 in (1.88 m)	175 lb (79 kg)	1990	St. John's NYC	
(United States)	L. D. Williams	G/F	6 ft 4 in (1.93 m)	210 lb (95 kg)	2011	Wake Forest	
(United States)	Larry Williams	G	6 ft 0 in (1.83 m)	200 lb (91 kg)	No information	Chaffey; Globe	No information
(United States)	Reggie Williams	G/F	6 ft 6 in (1.98 m)	210 lb (95 kg)	2014	VMI	
(United States)	Rob Williams	G	6 ft 2 in (1.88 m)	175 lb (79 kg)	No information	Houston	
(United States)	Sean Williams	F/C	6 ft 10 in (2.08 m)	235 lb (107 kg)	2017	Boston	
(United States)	Terrence Williams	G/F	6 ft 6 in (1.98 m)	220 lb (100 kg)	2014	Louisville	
(United States)	Bubba Wilson	G	6 ft 3 in (1.91 m)	175 lb (79 kg)	1980	Western Carolina	No information
(United States)	Mike Wilson	G	6 ft 4 in (1.93 m)	175 lb (79 kg)	No information	Marquette	No information
(United States)	Ricky Wilson	G	6 ft 3 in (1.91 m)	195 lb (88 kg)	1990-91	George Mason	
(United States)	Kennard Winchester	F	6 ft 5 in (1.96 m)	210 lb (95 kg)	No information	James Madison; Averett	No information
(United States)	Francois Wise	F	6 ft 6 in (1.98 m)	220 lb (100 kg)	1981–83; 1985; 1987	The Beach	
(United States)	Wesley Witherspoon	G/F	6 ft 9 in (2.06 m)	206 lb (93 kg)	2014	Memphis	
(United States)	David Wood	F	6 ft 6 in (1.98 m)	227 lb (103 kg)	2001	Skagit Valley; UN Reno	
(United States)	Leon Wood	G	6 ft 3 in (1.91 m)	185 lb (84 kg)	No information	Arizona; Cal State Fullerton	
(United States)	Antoine Wright	G/F	6 ft 7 in (2.01 m)	215 lb (98 kg)	2016	Texas A&M	
(United States)	Joey Wright	G	6 ft 3 in (1.91 m)	185 lb (84 kg)	1992	Drake; UT Austin	
(United States)	Keith Wright	F	6 ft 8 in (2.03 m)	240 lb (109 kg)	2017	Harvard	
(United States)	Joe Wylie	F	6 ft 9 in (2.06 m)	210 lb (95 kg)	1999	Miami	

== Y ==
Nat.	Name	Pos.	Ht.	Wt.	Playing years	College/University	Ref.
(United States)	David Young	G/F	6 ft 5 in (1.96 m)	No information	2011	Xavier; NC Central	
(United States)	Galen Young	F	6 ft 6 in (1.98 m)	220 lb (100 kg)	2004; 2007	Northwest Miss; UNC Charlotte	
(United States)	Keena Young	F	6 ft 6 in (1.98 m)	215 lb (98 kg)	2010	South Plains; The Y	
(United States)	Michael Young	G/F	6 ft 7 in (2.01 m)	220 lb (100 kg)	1986–87	Houston	
(United States)	Perry Young	G	6 ft 5 in (1.96 m)	210 lb (95 kg)	1986; 1988	Virginia Tech	

== Z ==
Nat.	Name	Pos.	Ht.	Wt.	Playing years	College/University	Ref.
(Iran)	Iman Zandi	G	6 ft 2 in (1.88 m)	195 lb (88 kg)	2016	No information	
(United States)	Martin Zeno	G	6 ft 5 in (1.96 m)	205 lb (93 kg)	2011	Texas Tech	No information
(Canada)	Jim Zoet	C	7 ft 1 in (2.16 m)	240 lb (109 kg)	1981	Kent State; Lakehead	

== More PBA imports lists ==
A–E | F–J | K–O | P–T | U–Z
