= Archie Talley =

American basketball player and motivational speaker

Archie Talley (born c. 1953) is an American basketball player and motivational speaker.

Talley is a Washington, D.C. native, where he became a Central High School legend. He holds a baccalaureate in human relations and a Master of Arts in education from Salem College. Talley played briefly for the New Jersey Nets only in the preseason before going on to play professionally for ten seasons in Europe, where he continued to be a scoring phenomenon.

Talley led the nation in scoring in 1976 while finishing his career at Salem College (now Salem University) in Salem, West Virginia. In 1976 he was named the Associated Press College Division Basketball Player of the Year and First Team All-American by the National Association of Intercollegiate Athletics (NAIA). In the era before the 3-point shot, he achieved a career average of 41.1 points per game despite being double- and triple-teamed on virtually every play. He still holds the NAIA record for most points in a single season with 1347 (577 FG and 193 FT in 33 games). Since 1984 Talley has been a motivational speaker, giving talks to children and young people and for professional and corporate events.

== See also ==
- List of basketball players who have scored 100 points in a single game
