= Andrew Fields =

American professional basketball player and coach

Personal information
- Born: January 10, 1957 (age 69) Atlantic City, New Jersey, U.S.
- Listed height: 6 ft 8 in (2.03 m)
- Listed weight: 200 lb (91 kg)

Career information
- High school: Atlantic City (Atlantic City, New Jersey)
- College: Cheyney (1975–1979)
- NBA draft: 1979: 2nd round, 40th overall pick
- Drafted by: Portland Trail Blazers
- Position: Center / power forward
- Number: 1

Career history

Playing
- 1979–1983: Toyota Super Corollas

Coaching
- 2011–2015: Atlantic Cape CC

Career highlights
- 3× PBA champion (1979 Invitational, 1981 Open, 1982 Open); PBA Best Import of the Conference (1981)
- Stats at Basketball Reference

Andrew L. Fields (born January 10, 1957) is an American former professional basketball player and coach. As a player, he led Cheyney State to the 1978 NCAA Division II championship, where he was named playoff MVP. His success led him to be drafted with the 18th pick of the second round of the 1979 NBA draft by the Portland Trail Blazers. He however failed to land a contract when Blazers management decided to sign just one player.

A resident of Atlantic City, New Jersey, Fields graduated from Atlantic City High School in 1975.

He played overseas, earning playing contracts in Belgium, the Netherlands, France, Switzerland, and most notably in the Philippines for Toyota in the Philippine Basketball Association (PBA).

In the Philippines, Fields was among the best defensive and rebounding imports in PBA history, with a career average of 15.5 rebounds per game. He was an adept shotblocker, feared by local players and fellow imports. During his stint with Toyota, he sparked the team's dreaded fastbreak either with a shotblock swatted to the direction of a streaking teammate on the wings or a sharp outlet pass which he threw like an American football forward pass to a teammate at the other end, usually Francis Arnaiz or Arnie Tuadles. He was part of the 1981 Toyota team that won the Open Conference championship over arch-rival Crispa Redmanizers, playing alongside fellow import Victor King. In that same conference he won the PBA's Best Import of the Conference Award. The following year, he teamed up with Donnie Ray Koonce to lead Toyota to the 1982 Open Conference title.

On August 19, 2011, Fields was named the Head Men's Basketball Coach at Atlantic Cape Community College. In his first season, he led Atlantic Cape to a 16–15 record and their first Region XIX Final Four appearance in 20 years. In February 2015, Fields was replaced by Marvin Graham as coach after becoming unable to return to coaching due to a car accident in January.
