= Philippine School of Business Administration =

Private college in Quezon City, Philippines

- Paaralang Pamamahala ng Pangangalakal ng Pilipinas (Filipino)
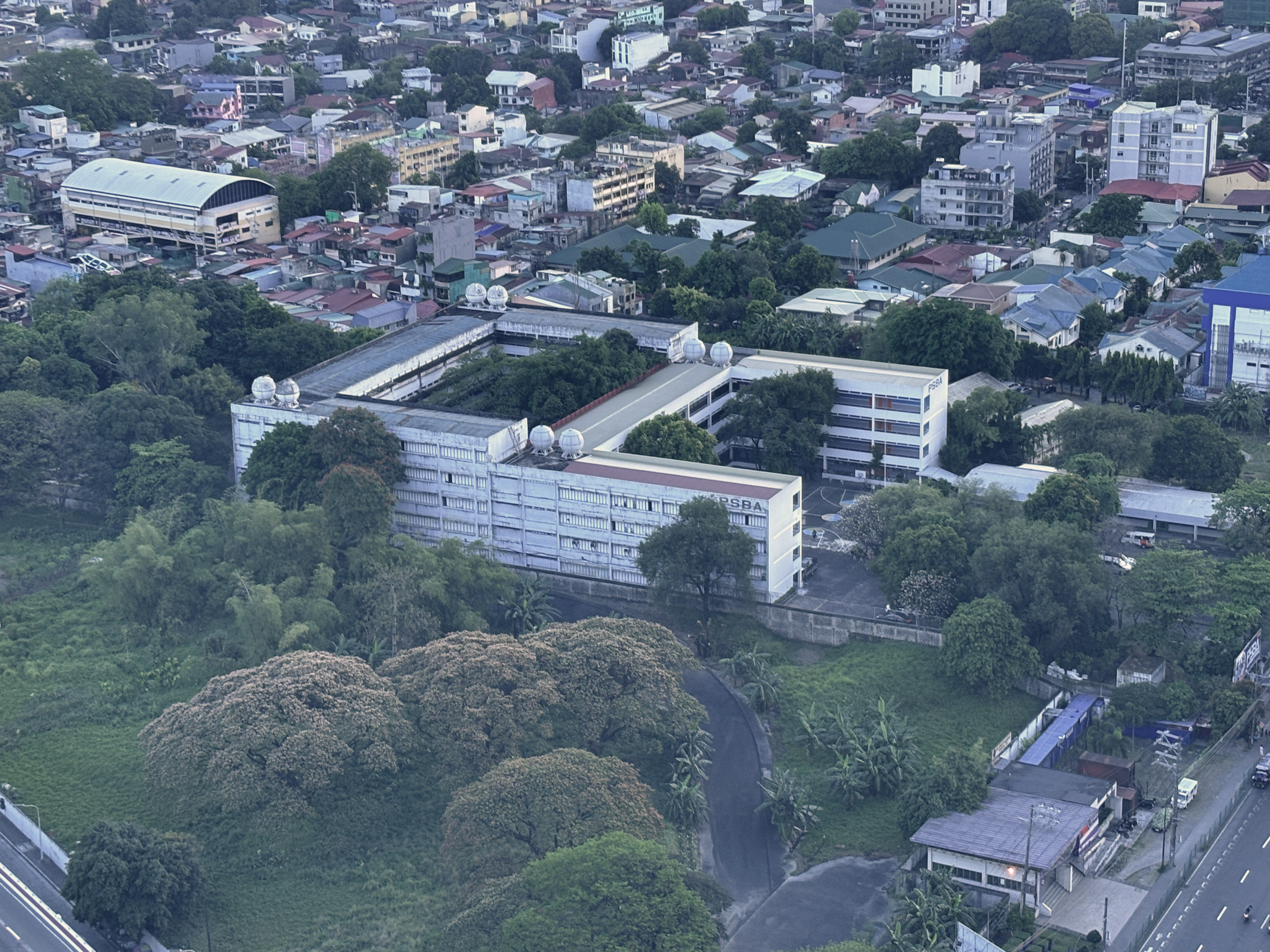
- Quezon City campus of PSBA
- Former names: Philippine Accounting and Taxation Training School
- Motto: Legacy Renewed, Future Redefined.
- Type: Private, For-profit
- Established: October 1963; 62 years ago
- Chairman: Jose F. Peralta
- Location: Quezon City, Metro Manila, Philippines; 14°37′47.36″N 121°4′22.25″E
- Colors: Royal Blue and Bright Orange
- Nickname: Jaguars
- Sporting affiliations: UCAA
- Mascot: Jaguar
- Website: www.psba.edu/en/

- Location of Quezon City campus in Metro Manila Location in Luzon Location in the Philippines

The Philippine School of Business Administration is a college located in Quezon City in Metro Manila, Philippines. The college was established in 1963 in Manila. Its Quezon City campus opened in June 1963. In September 2013, the Quezon City campus was announced to be closed on October for financial losses, but the Quezon City Regional Trial Court prevented the closure.

In February 2024, STI College's Eusebio H. Tanco announced per a Philippine Stock Exchange disclosure, that its Board ratified the execution of a Term sheet with Philippine School of Business Administration (Manila & Quezon City) covering the takeover by STI of the operations of PSBA.

== Campuses ==
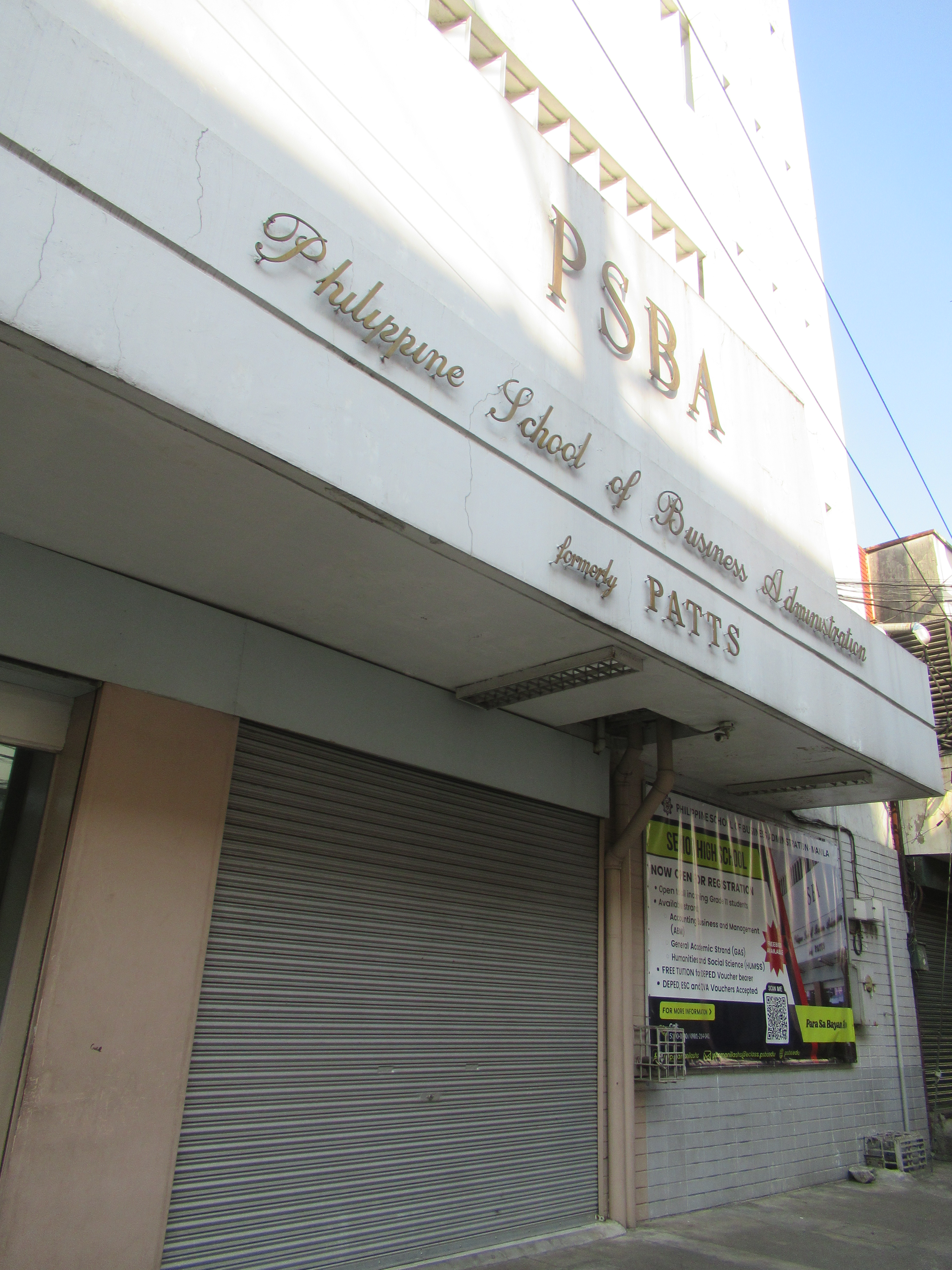
PSBA in Sampaloc, Manila

=== Manila campus ===
The original campus of PSBA is located at 826 R. Papa Street, in Sampaloc.

=== Quezon City campus ===
The Quezon City campus of PSBA, also known as PSBA-QC, opened in June 1981. It is located at 1029 Aurora Boulevard, Quezon City.

== Quezon City campus closure ==
On May 29, 2006, the Quezon City Engineering Office conducted investigations on allegations of illegal digging within the campus to search for Yamashita's gold. The excavation, which did not apply for necessary permits, caused concerns for the safety of the campus. The Quezon City government decided on September not to close PSBA as no evidence of excavation was found.

PSBA announced on September 20, 2013, that the Quezon City campus would be closed in October 18, the end of the academic year's first semester, due to “serious business losses" for the past eight years in a unanimous decision. Students would be admitted to the Manila campus for the second semester, while employment of staff would be terminated in November.

A letter from the Commission on Higher Education stating that PSBA-QC can only close after the end of an academic year was announced in an open forum on September 30. Student groups of PSBA-QC filed a temporary restraining order on the closure of the campus on October 10. The 20-day temporary restraining order was issued on October 17. On November 7, the Quezon City Regional Trial Court decided that the school would remain open indefinitely as there was weak evidence of financial losses.
