= 1982 PBA Open Conference =

- Duration: August 22 – December 14, 1982
- TV partner(s): Vintage Sports (BBC)

Finals
- Champions: Toyota Super Corollas
- Runners-up: Gilbey's Gin

Awards
- Best Import: Donnie Ray Koonce (Toyota Super Corollas)

PBA Open Conference chronology
- < 1981 1983 >

PBA conference chronology
- < 1982 Invitational 1983 All-Filipino >

The 1982 Philippine Basketball Association (PBA) Open Conference was the third conference of the 1982 PBA season. It started on August 22 and ended on December 14, 1982. The tournament is an import-laden format, which requires two imports per each team.

== Format ==
The following format will be observed for the duration of the tournament:

- The 8 participating teams are divided into two groups. Teams in the same group played each other twice while in the other group three times, totalling 18 games.
- Top two teams advances in the semifinals outright and the next four teams will dispute the last two semifinals berth in a one-round quarterfinals (back to zero standings).
- Semifinals will be a double-round robin affairs. The top two teams in the semifinal round advance to the best-of-five finals series. The last two teams dispute the third-place trophy in a best-of-five playoff.

== Imports ==
Each team were allowed two imports. The first line in the table are the original reinforcements of the teams. Below the name are the replacement of the import above. Same with the third replacement that is also highlighted with a different color. GP is the number of games played.

Team	Name	GP	Name	GP
Crispa Redmanizers	Mike Schultz	3	Clarence Kea	1
Crispa Redmanizers	James Wright	5	Lew Brown	12
Crispa Redmanizers	Mike Gibson	8		
Galerie Dominique	James Robinson	4	Kenny Barnes	18
Galerie Dominique	Micah Blunt	14		
Gilbey's Gin	Rickey Brown	3	Lew Massey	27
Gilbey's Gin	Larry McNeill	24		
N-Rich Coffee	Danny Salisbury	27	Rich Adams	28
San Miguel Beermen	Terry Sykes	2	Norman Black	30
San Miguel Beermen	Marvin Johnson	5		
San Miguel Beermen	Aaron James	23		
Toyota Super Corollas	Donnie Ray Koonce	30	Andrew Fields	29
U-Tex Wranglers	Ira Terrell	11	Leroy Jackson	21
U-Tex Wranglers	Leo Cunningham	2		
U-Tex Wranglers	Francois Wise	8		
Yco-Tanduay	Curtis Berry	21	Jerome Henderson	21

== Elimination round ==
Pos	Team	W	L	PCT	GB	Qualification
1	N-Rich Coffee Creamers	13	5	.722	—	Advance to semifinal round
2	Gilbey's Gin	13	5	.722	—	Advance to semifinal round
3	YCO-Tanduay	11	7	.611	2	Proceed to quarterfinal round
4	San Miguel Beermen	10	8	.556	3	Proceed to quarterfinal round
5	Toyota Super Corollas	8	10	.444	5	Proceed to quarterfinal round
6	U-Tex Wranglers	8	10	.444	5	Proceed to quarterfinal round
7	Crispa Redmanizers	6	12	.333	7	
8	Galerie Dominique Artists	3	15	.167	10	

== Quarterfinal round ==
Pos	Team	W	L	PCT	GB	Qualification
3	Toyota Super Corollas	2	1	.667	—	Semifinal round
4	San Miguel Beermen	2	1	.667	—	Semifinal round
5	YCO-Tanduay	1	2	.333	1	
6	U-Tex Wranglers	1	2	.333	1	

== Semifinal round ==
Pos	Team	W	L	PCT	GB	Qualification
1	Gilbey's Gin	4	2	.667	—	Advance to the Finals
2	Toyota Super Corollas	3	3	.500 (Note: Second-seed playoff: Toyota 114–87 N-Rich)	1	Advance to the Finals
3	N-Rich Coffee Creamers	3	3	.500	1	Proceed to third place playoff
4	San Miguel Beermen	2	4	.333	2	Proceed to third place playoff

Notes:

On the final playing day of the semifinals, both Gilbey's and N-Rich were a win away from advancing to the championship in the closest the PBA has ever had a finale without traditional powerhouses Toyota and Crispa, but the Super Corollas forces a playoff with N-Rich Coffee and won their knockout game to play first-time finalist Gilbey's Gin.

== Second seed playoff ==
Vintage

December 9

Toyota Super Corollas 114, N-Rich Coffee Creamers 97

Araneta Coliseum, Quezon City

== Finals ==
Vintage

December 11

Toyota Super Corollas 108, Gilbey's Gin 100

Araneta Coliseum, Quezon City

Vintage

December 12

Toyota Super Corollas 121, Gilbey's Gin 107

Araneta Coliseum, Quezon City

Vintage

December 14

Toyota Super Corollas 122, Gilbey's Gin 109
Toyota wins series, 3–0

Araneta Coliseum, Quezon City
