= 1982 PBA Reinforced Filipino Conference =

- Duration: March 7 – July 13, 1982
- TV partner(s): Vintage Sports (BBC)

Finals
- Champions: Toyota Super Corollas
- Runners-up: San Miguel Beermen

Awards
- Best Import: Norman Black (San Miguel Beermen)

PBA Reinforced Filipino Conference chronology
- 1983 >

PBA conference chronology
- < 1981 Reinforced Filipino 1982 Invitational >

The 1982 Philippine Basketball Association (PBA) Reinforced Filipino Conference was the first conference of the 1982 PBA season. It started on March 7 and ended on July 13, 1982. The tournament is an import-laden format, which requires an import with the height limit of 6"5' and below for each team.

== Format ==
The following format was observed for the duration of the tournament:

- The eight participating teams were divided into two groups; teams in the same group played each other twice, while in the other group three times, totalling 18 games.
- A series of best-of-three quarterfinals, best-of-five semifinals, and the first-ever best-of-seven championship series will determine the PBA First Conference champion.

== Elimination round ==
Pos	Team	W	L	PCT	GB	Qualification
1	San Miguel Beermen	13	5	.722	—	Advance to semifinals
2	Crispa Redmanizers	12	6	.667	1	Advance to semifinals
3	Gilbey's Gin	11	7	.611	2	Proceed to quarterfinals
4	Toyota Super Corollas	10	8	.556	3	Proceed to quarterfinals
5	YCO-Tanduay	9	9	.500	4	Proceed to quarterfinals
6	U-Tex Wranglers	8	10	.444	5	Proceed to quarterfinals
7	Mariwasa-Honda TMXers	7	11	.389	6	
8	Great Taste Coffee Makers	2	16	.111	11	

== Bracket ==
Quarterfinals (Best-of-3)
3	Gilbey's	0
6	U-Tex	2
4	Toyota	2
5	YCO-Tanduay	0

Semifinals (Best-of-5)
1	San Miguel	3
6	U-Tex	1
2	Crispa	2
4	Toyota	3

Finals (Best-of-7)
1	San Miguel	3
4	Toyota	4

== Quarterfinals ==
=== (3) Gilbey's Gin vs. (6) U/Tex ===
Vintage

June 10

Gilbey's Gin 110, U/Tex Wranglers 116

Araneta Coliseum, Quezon City

Vintage

June 12

Gilbey's Gin 100, U/Tex Wranglers 104
U/Tex wins series, 2–0

Araneta Coliseum, Quezon City

Bogs Adornado scored four straight points in the final 30 seconds, including two charities to seal the win and eliminated the Gins.

=== (4) Toyota vs. (5) Yco-Tanduay ===
Vintage

June 10

Toyota Super Corollas 124, Yco-Tanduay 115

Araneta Coliseum, Quezon City

Vintage

June 12

Toyota Super Corollas 128, Yco-Tanduay 120
Toyota wins series, 2–0

Araneta Coliseum, Quezon City

Arnie Tuadles and Donnie Ray Koonce took over in the third quarter and gave Toyota a 95–77 advantage. The Super Corollas trailed by as many as 15 points in the first half.

== Semifinals ==
=== (1) San Miguel vs. (6) U/Tex ===
Vintage

June 15

San Miguel Beermen 119, U/Tex Wranglers 111
Pts: Norman Black 46	Pts: Julius Wayne 31

Araneta Coliseum, Quezon City

Vintage

June 17

San Miguel Beermen 95, U/Tex Wranglers 97
Pts: Norman Black 40	Pts: Bogs Adornado 25

Araneta Coliseum, Quezon City

Vintage

June 19

recap

San Miguel Beermen 122, U/Tex Wranglers 91
Pts: Norman Black 35

Araneta Coliseum, Quezon City

Vintage

June 22

San Miguel Beermen 118, U/Tex Wranglers 99
Pts: Norman Black 45	Pts: Julius Wayne 32
San Miguel wins series, 3–1

Araneta Coliseum, Quezon City

=== (2) Crispa vs. (4) Toyota ===
Vintage

June 15

Crispa Redmanizers 115, Toyota Super Corollas 101
Scoring by quarter: 38–23, 18–30, 21–17, 38–31
Pts: Glenn Hagan 18	Pts: Donnie Ray Koonce 30

Araneta Coliseum, Quezon City

Vintage

June 17

Crispa Redmanizers 114, Toyota Super Corollas 122
Scoring by quarter: 20–27, 33–28, 34–35, 27–32
Pts: Glenn Hagan 41	Pts: Donnie Ray Koonce 41

Araneta Coliseum, Quezon City

Vintage

June 19

Crispa Redmanizers 117, Toyota Super Corollas 114

Araneta Coliseum, Quezon City

Vintage

June 22

Crispa Redmanizers 114, Toyota Super Corollas 125
Scoring by quarter: 23–22, 31–32, 32–36, 28–35
Pts: Atoy Co 27	Pts: Ramon Fernandez 38

Araneta Coliseum, Quezon City

Vintage

June 24

Crispa Redmanizers 104, Toyota Super Corollas 111
Scoring by quarter: 28–23, 26–29, 30–26, 20–33
Pts: Philip Cezar 25	Pts: Donnie Ray Koonce 39
Toyota wins series, 3–2

Araneta Coliseum, Quezon City

Donnie Ray Koonce scored eight crucial points in a 10–2 Toyota run to give the Super Corollas a 107–99 lead in the last two minutes of the deciding fifth game of their semifinal series. Crispa fought back on a five-point burst by Atoy Co to trim down Toyota's margin to three, 104–107, but Ramon Fernandez fired the last two of his 25 points on a hard drive for a 109–104 Toyota lead with 52 seconds left.

== Finals ==
Vintage

June 29

San Miguel Beermen 120, Toyota Super Corollas 110

Araneta Coliseum, Quezon City

Vintage

July 1

San Miguel Beermen 119, Toyota Super Corollas 117

Araneta Coliseum, Quezon City

Vintage

July 3

San Miguel Beermen 87, Toyota Super Corollas 90

Araneta Coliseum, Quezon City

Vintage

July 6

San Miguel Beermen 96, Toyota Super Corollas 98

Araneta Coliseum, Quezon City

Vintage

July 8

San Miguel Beermen 96, Toyota Super Corollas 88

Araneta Coliseum, Quezon City

Vintage

July 10

San Miguel Beermen 99, Toyota Super Corollas 110

Araneta Coliseum, Quezon City

Vintage

July 13

San Miguel Beermen 95, Toyota Super Corollas 101
Toyota wins series, 4–3

Araneta Coliseum, Quezon City
