= 1982 PBA Invitational championship =

Championship

- Duration: July 25 – August 10, 1982
- TV partner(s): Vintage Sports (BBC)

Finals
- Champions: San Miguel Beermen
- Runners-up: Crispa Redmanizers

PBA Invitational championship chronology
- < 1980 1984 >

PBA conference chronology
- < 1982 Reinforced Filipino 1982 Open >

The 1982 PBA Invitational championship was a short tournament featuring the visiting South Korean squad and the top four teams of the Reinforced Filipino Conference. It started on July 25 and ended on August 10, 1982.

== Format ==
The following format will be observed for the duration of the tournament:

- The top four teams of the 1982 PBA Reinforced Filipino Conference and a guest foreign team (Korea national basketball team) will compete for this conference.
- Single-round robin eliminations; 4 games per team; Teams are then seeded by basis on win–loss records.
- The top two teams after the round-robin will advance to the best-of-three finals series.

== Elimination round ==
Pos	Team	W	L	PCT	GB	Qualification
1	San Miguel Beermen	3	1	.750	—	Advance to the finals
2	Crispa Redmanizers	3	1	.750	—	Advance to the finals
3	Nicholas Stoodley (South Korea national team) (G)	2	2	.500	1	Proceed to third-place playoff
4	Toyota Super Corollas	2	2	.500	1	Proceed to third-place playoff
5	U-Tex Wranglers	0	4	.000	3	

(G) Guests

== Third-place playoffs ==
Vintage

August 5

South Korea 115, Toyota Super Corollas 107
Pts: Lee Chung Hee 39	Pts: Cordero 23 Fernandez 22

Araneta Coliseum, Quezon City

The Koreans were comfortably ahead by 21 points at halftime, 65–44, but were limited to only 14 points in the third quarter. They recovered in the final period and won by a safe margin despite losing four men on six fouls each.

Vintage

August 7

South Korea 142, Toyota Super Corollas 107
Pts: Lee Chung Hee 33
South Korea wins series, 2–0

Araneta Coliseum, Quezon City

South Korea clinch third place by outclassing Toyota in a game marred by a violent outburst that saw a provocative Korean and three Super Corollas thrown out midway in the last quarter. The Sokors led all the way and scored this conference's most points and biggest winning margin in the game. Toyota missed Francis Arnaiz, also in the sick list with Robert Jaworski.

== Finals ==
1982 PBA Invitational championship finals
Team	Coach	Wins
San Miguel Beermen	Tommy Manotoc	2
Crispa Redmanizers	Baby Dalupan	1
- Dates: August 5–10, 1982
- Television: Vintage (BBC)

PBA Invitational championship finals chronology
- < 1980 1984 >

PBA finals chronology
- < 1982 Reinforced Filipino 1982 Open >

The 1982 Philippine Basketball Association (PBA) Invitational championship finals was the best-of-3 basketball championship series of the 1982 PBA Invitational Conference, and the conclusion of the conference's playoffs. San Miguel Beermen and Crispa Redmanizers played for the 25th championship contested by the league.

San Miguel Beermen won their 2nd championship.

=== Series scoring summary ===
The following scoring summary is written in a line score format, except that the quarter numbers are replaced by game numbers.

Team	Game 1	Game 2	Game 3	Wins
San Miguel	102	100	103	2
Crispa	96	104	102	1

† denotes the number of overtimes

Vintage

August 5

San Miguel Beermen 102, Crispa Redmanizers 96
Pts: Norman Black 41	Pts: Philip Cezar 20

Araneta Coliseum, Quezon City

Crispa came back from a 10-point deficit, 79–89, to lead 93–92, on a jumper by Atoy Co with 4:43 left in the game, but the Redmanizers did themselves in with passing errors, those turnovers set up back-to-back goals by Beerman Alex Tan, a side jumper by Marte Saldaña and Norman Black scored on another error by Ramon Cruz to give the Beermen a 100–93 lead, time down to 1:06 remaining. The Redmanizers absorbed their fifth loss to the Beermen and has yet to win over San Miguel in this season.

Vintage

August 7

San Miguel Beermen 104, Crispa Redmanizers 110
Pts: Norman Black 37	Pts: Glenn Hagan 26

Araneta Coliseum, Quezon City

Crispa finally won a game against San Miguel this season and stay alive, tying the championship playoff at one game each. Beermen import Norman Black fouled out with a little more than two minutes left in the final quarter. The Redmanizers at one point, trailed by 14 points but the breaks of the game went their way, the Beermen failed to capitalize of free throws, they converted only 3 out of 10 tries in the last minutes of the ballgame.

Vintage

August 10

San Miguel Beermen 103, Crispa Redmanizers 102
Pts: Norman Black 44	Pts: Abet Guidaben 21
San Miguel wins series, 2–1

Araneta Coliseum, Quezon City

The Beermen were down by nine points with 7:57 to go in the final period when an 11–2 run tied the count at 94-all. Norman Black, rookie Marte Saldaña and Manny Paner combined to give the Beermen a 103–98 edge with time down to 1:13 left. The Redmanizers threatened for the last time, 102–103, with 28 seconds remaining on two free throws by Atoy Co and Abet Guidaben, after Norman Black missed on a quartercourt jumper, Glenn Hagan gained possession but the Crispa import ran into a triple team and lost the ball, Hagan inbounded to Philip Cezar with three seconds left, Cezar muffed a short jumper, giving the title to San Miguel Beermen, which bag their second championship in the PBA.
