= List of Philippine Basketball Association imports career scoring leaders =

This is a list of Philippine Basketball Association imports by the highest total number of points scored in their stint or tenure with the league.

Statistics accurate as of January 16, 2023.

Italics^	Active PBA import

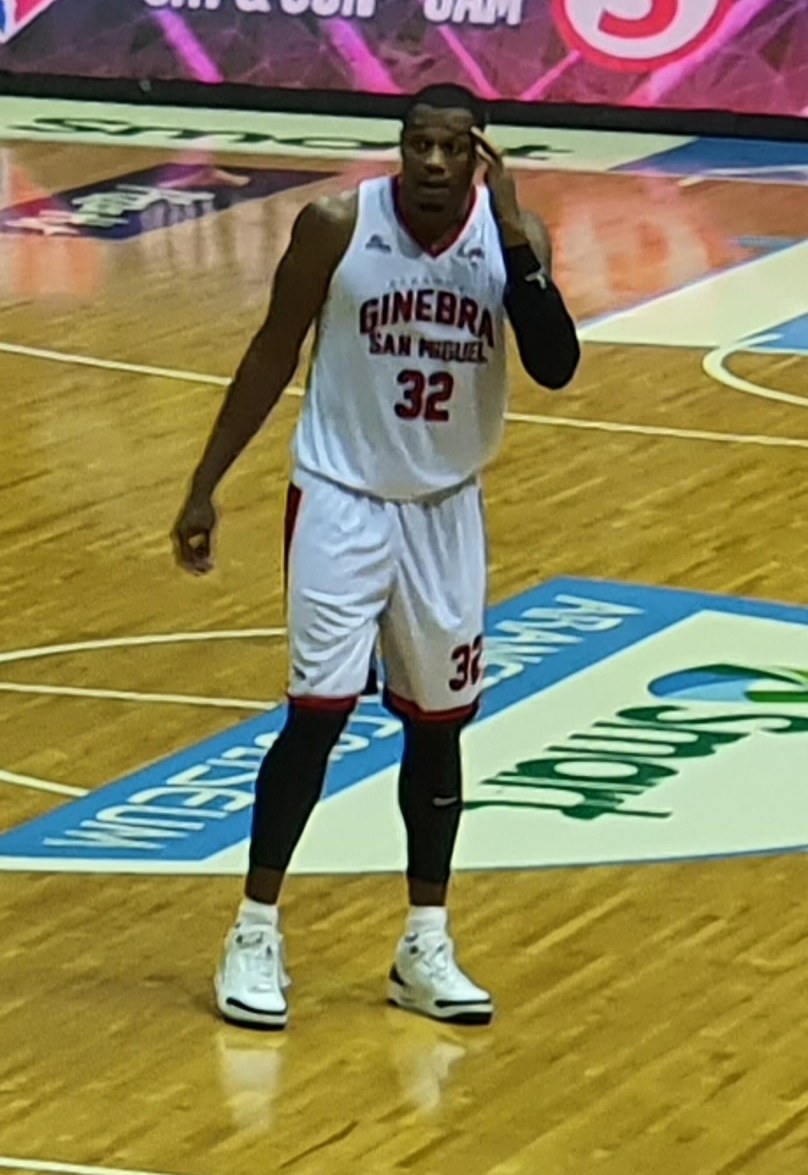
Justin Brownlee is the fifth all-time career scoring leader of the league among imports.

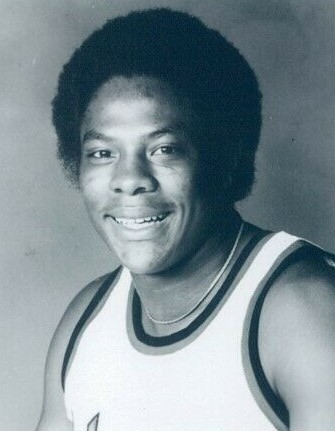
Billy Ray Bates is the sixth all-time career scoring leader of the league among imports.

Rank	Player	Position(s)	Years played	Team(s) played	Total points	Games played	Points per game average	Reference
1	Norman Black	C	1981–1982, 1985–1988, 1990, 1998	Tefilin, San Miguel/Magnolia, Great Taste, Alaska, Pop Cola	11,329	282	40.2	
2	Bobby Parks	C	1987–1993, 1997–1999	San Miguel Beer, Shell	8,955	221	40.5	
3	Sean Chambers	PF/SF	1989–2001	Alaska Milkmen / Aces	8,225	270	30.5	
4	Lew Massey	SG/SF	1981–1983	Presto Fun Drinks, Gilbey's Gin	5,386	124	43.4	
5	Justin Brownlee	SF/PF	2016–present	Barangay Ginebra San Miguel	5,268	182	28.9	
6	Billy Ray Bates	SG/SF	1983, 1986–1988	Crispa Redmanizers, Barangay Ginebra San Miguel	4,523	98	46.2	
7	Francois Wise	PF	1981–1983, 1985, 1987	U-Tex Wranglers, Tanduay Rhum Makers, Manila Beer Brewmasters, Hills Bros. Coffee Kings	4,332	118	36.7	
8	Larry McNeill	PF/C	1979	Gilbey's Gin	4,169	100	41.7	
9	Donnie Ray Koonce	SG/SF	1982–1983, 1986	Toyota Super Corollas, San Miguel Beermen, Alaska Milkmen	4,103	136	30.2	
10	Billy Ray Robinson	C	1975–1979	Mariwasa Panthers, U-Tex Wranglers	4,024	185	21.8	
11	Byron Jones	PF/SF	1975–1981	Toyota Comets, U/Tex Wranglers, Honda Hagibis, Crispa Redmanizers	4,018	198	20.3	
12	Kenny Travis	G	1988–1995	Purefoods Hotdogs, San Miguel Beermen	3,089	80	38.6	
13	Michael Hackett	PF/C	1985–1987	Barangay Ginebra San Miguel	2,949			

== See also ==
- List of Philippine Basketball Association players
