= 1982 PBA Reinforced Filipino Conference finals =

Team	Coach	Wins
Toyota Super Corollas	Edgardo Ocampo	4
San Miguel Beermen	Tommy Manotoc	3
- Dates: June 29 – July 13, 1982
- Television: Vintage Sports (City2)
- Radio network: DWXL

PBA Reinforced Filipino Conference finals chronology
- < 1981 1983 >

The 1982 PBA Reinforced Filipino Conference finals was the best-of-7 basketball championship series of the 1982 PBA Reinforced Filipino Conference, and the conclusion of the conference playoffs. This is the first championship series in the PBA that was contested in a best-of-seven format.

The Toyota Super Corollas won against San Miguel Beermen in the finals series that went the full route of seven games.

== Qualification ==
San Miguel Beermen		Toyota Super Corollas
Finished 13–5 (.722), 1st	Eliminations	Finished 10–8 (.556), 4th
Qualified outright semis	Quarterfinals	2–0 sweep over Yco-Tanduay (best-of-3)
3–1 win over U-Tex (best-of-5)	Semifinals	3–2 win over Crispa (best-of-5)

== Games summary ==
=== Game 1 ===
Vintage

June 29

Toyota Super Corollas 110, San Miguel Beermen 120
Pts: Donnie Ray Koonce 27	Pts: Norman Black 55

Araneta Coliseum, Quezon City

=== Game 2 ===
Vintage

July 1

recap

Toyota Super Corollas 117, San Miguel Beermen 119
Scoring by quarter: 29–27, 35–29, 31–23, 22–40
Pts: Arnie Tuadles 27	Pts: Norman Black 58

Araneta Coliseum, Quezon City

San Miguel rallied from a 19-point deficit, trailed 70–89 in the third period, the Beermen relied on the ballhawking of veteran Yoyong Martirez, the hustling of Melchor Ravanes and the shooting of Manny Paner. Martirez took four crucial steals to move the Beermen to within 90–97, they seize the lead, 116–113, with 37 ticks left. Ramon Fernandez and Terry Saldaña scored on four free throws and Norman Black made one charity for a tie at 117, sending the match to a pulsating finish with 14 seconds to go, the Beermen worked up 12 seconds to set up the final basket and Norman Black responded with his jumper in front of the San Miguel bench.

=== Game 3 ===
Vintage

July 3

recap

Toyota Super Corollas 90, San Miguel Beermen 87
Scoring by quarter: 27–19, 21–22, 22–26, 20–20
Pts: Arnie Tuadles 24	Pts: Norman Black 43

Araneta Coliseum, Quezon City

With Toyota ahead by three, 88–85, in the last 19 seconds, Beermen Alex Tan muffed his charities and Marte Saldaña missed a long three-point attempt, Francis Arnaiz converted his two free throws in the last nine seconds to ice the game, 90–85 for Toyota.

=== Game 4 ===
Vintage

July 6

recap

Toyota Super Corollas 98, San Miguel Beermen 96
Scoring by quarter: 27–26, 31–27, 24–21, 16–22
Pts: Arnie Tuadles 25	Pts: Norman Black 46

Araneta Coliseum, Quezon City

Toyota scored six points in the last 64 seconds with Arnie Tuadles converting on a fastbreak pitch by Abe King in the last 13 seconds to enable the Super Corollas to save a solid game from another disastrous end, the Beermen battled back from a 12-point deficit and had victory on hand with 1:08 left with a four-point margin, 96–92.

=== Game 5 ===
Vintage

July 8

recap

Toyota Super Corollas 88, San Miguel Beermen 96
Scoring by quarter: 21–21, 25–28, 29–23, 13–24
Pts: Ramon Fernandez 33	Pts: Norman Black 44

Araneta Coliseum, Quezon City

San Miguel limited Toyota to only 13 points in the final period, the Corollas got only four field goals, including Ramon Fernandez' three-pointer and four free throws in the last 12 minutes. Arnie Tuadles was ejected from the game with 8:41 left in the fourth quarter for tripping Norman Black.

=== Game 6 ===
Vintage

July 10

recap

Toyota Super Corollas 110, San Miguel Beermen 99
Scoring by quarter: 29–29, 19–18, 35–22, 27–30
Pts: Donnie Ray Koonce 26	Pts: Norman Black 41

Araneta Coliseum, Quezon City

Abe King's defensive chores held Norman Black to his lowest production of 41 points, Toyota forged ahead by 18 points at the start of the third quarter, 81–63, on 12 quick points by King, Tuadles and Koonce, the Beermen struggled to within six points, 86–92, but Koonce and Ramon Fernandez combined for a 100–92 Toyota lead with 2:55 left.

=== Game 7 ===
Vintage

July 13

Toyota Super Corollas 101, San Miguel Beermen 95
Scoring by quarter: 28–25, 23–21, 22–23, 28–26
Pts: Donnie Ray Koonce 27	Pts: Norman Black 50
Toyota wins series, 4–3

Araneta Coliseum, Quezon City

The Super Corollas banked on a series of free throws by Donnie Ray Koonce, who hit 13 of his 27 points in the fourth quarter, Toyota exploited San Miguel's dilemma on penalty situation to keep the lead, 99–91 with 1:02 left. Anthony Dasalla completed a Black' assist under the goal and Rudy Lalota converted on a bad inbound by Koonce as the Beermen put their last stand with 1:42 to go, Toyota was in control by then, the Toyota fans spilled into the hardcourt even before the final buzzer ending the best-of-seven series.

1982 PBA Reinforced Filipino Conference Champions

Toyota Super Corollas
Eight title

== Rosters ==
Toyota Super Corollas roster
Players
Coaches

Pos.	No.	Nat.	Name	Ht.	Wt.
F/C	6	(Philippines)	Abe King	6 ft 3 in (1.91 m)		San Beda
G	7	(Philippines)	Robert Jaworski	6 ft 0 in (1.83 m)		UE
G	8	(Philippines)	Francis Arnaiz	5 ft 10 in (1.78 m)		Ateneo
F/C	10	(Philippines)	Ramon Fernandez	6 ft 4 in (1.93 m)		San Carlos
G/F	11	(Philippines)	Arnie Tuadles	6 ft 2 in (1.88 m)		Visayas
G/F	13	(Philippines)	Timoteo Coloso	6 ft 2 in (1.88 m)		Letran
F	15	(Philippines)	Ricky Relosa	6 ft 4 in (1.93 m)		Mapúa
F/C	17	(Philippines)	Antero Saldaña	6 ft 3 in (1.91 m)		Letran
F	18	(Philippines)	Emerito Legaspi	5 ft 11 in (1.80 m)		UE
F	20	(Philippines)	Nicanor Bulaong	6 ft 3 in (1.91 m)		Far Eastern
G/F	22	(Philippines)	Danny Florencio	5 ft 10 in (1.78 m)		UST
G/F	30	(United States)	Donnie Ray Koonce (I)	6 ft 3 in (1.91 m)		North Carolina
F	41	(Philippines)	Leopoldo Herrera	6 ft 2 in (1.88 m)		Wesleyan Philippines
F/C	88	(Philippines)	Edgardo Cordero	6 ft 4 in (1.93 m)		UST

Head coach

- (Philippines) Ed Ocampo

Assistant coach(es)

- (Philippines) Rino Salazar

Legend

- (C) Team captain
- (I) Import
- Injured

San Miguel Beermen roster
Players
Coaches

Pos.	No.	Nat.	Name	Ht.	Wt.
G	4	(Philippines)	Alex Tan	6 ft 1 in (1.85 m)		UE
F/C	5	(Philippines)	Jesus Migalbin	6 ft 3 in (1.91 m)		San Agustin
G/F	6	(Philippines)	Biboy Ravanes	6 ft 1 in (1.85 m)		Cebu
G	7	(Philippines)	Marte Saldaña	5 ft 11 in (1.80 m)		Far Eastern
F	8	(Philippines)	Renato Lobo	6 ft 2 in (1.88 m)		Far Eastern
F/C	9	(Philippines)	Eduardo Dizon	6 ft 2 in (1.88 m)		José Rizal
F	13	(Philippines)	Manny Paner	6 ft 2 in (1.88 m)		Visayas
G	14	(Philippines)	Yoyong Martirez	5 ft 8 in (1.73 m)		Southwestern-U
F/C	15	(Philippines)	Rodolfo Lalota	6 ft 3 in (1.91 m)		Mapúa
F/C	17	(Philippines)	Kenneth Yap	6 ft 2 in (1.88 m)		De La Salle
G/F	22	(Philippines)	Ray Obias	5 ft 11 in (1.80 m)		UST
F	24	(United States)	Norman Black (I)	6 ft 5 in (1.96 m)		Saint Joseph's
G	34	(Philippines)	Renato Kabigting	6 ft 1 in (1.85 m)		Ateneo
F/C	99	(Philippines)	Anthony Dasalla	6 ft 3 in (1.91 m)		Far Eastern

Head coach

- (Philippines) Tommy Manotoc

Assistant coach(es)

Legend

- (C) Team captain
- (I) Import
- Injured

== Broadcast notes ==
Game	Play-by-play	Analyst	Courtside reporters
Game 1	Pinggoy Pengson	Steve Kattan and Glenn McDonald	Jun Bernardino
Game 2	Joe Cantada	Andy Jao	Jun Bernardino
Game 3	Pinggoy Pengson	Steve Kattan	Jun Bernardino
Game 4	Joe Cantada	Andy Jao	Jun Bernardino
Game 5	Pinggoy Pengson	Steve Kattan and Tito Eduque	Jun Bernardino
Game 6	Joe Cantada	Andy Jao	Jun Bernardino
Game 7	Pinggoy Pengson	Steve Kattan	Jun Bernardino
