= 1983 PBA Reinforced Filipino Conference finals =

Team	Coach	Wins
Crispa Redmanizers	Tommy Manotoc	3
Great Taste Coffee Makers	Jimmy Mariano	2
- Dates: August 11–23, 1983
- Television: Vintage Sports (City2)
- Radio network: DZRP

PBA Reinforced Filipino Conference finals chronology
- < 1982

The 1983 PBA Reinforced Filipino Conference finals was the best-of-5 basketball championship series of the 1983 PBA Reinforced Filipino Conference, and the conclusion of the conference playoffs.

The Crispa Redmanizers won their second championship of the season and 11th league title, winning over first-time finalist Great Taste Coffee Makers, three games to two, in their best-of-five championship series.

== Qualification ==
Crispa Redmanizers		Great Taste Coffee Makers
Finished 11–3 (.786), 1st	Eliminations	Finished 10–4 (.714), 2nd
Outright semis	Quarterfinals	Outright semis
Finished 4–2 (.667), tied for 1st	Semifinals	Finished 4–2 (.667), tied for 1st
Finished 4–2 (.667), tied for 1st	Tiebreaker	Won against Gilbey's Gin Gimlets, 129–123

== Games summary ==
=== Game 1 ===
Vintage

August 11

Crispa Redmanizers 128, Great Taste Coffee Makers 135
Scoring by quarter: 32–41, 34–36, 32–31, 30–27
Pts: Billy Ray Bates 47	Pts: Norman Black 45, Bogs Adornado 36

Araneta Coliseum, Quezon City

=== Game 2 ===
Vintage

August 14

Crispa Redmanizers 105, Great Taste Coffee Makers 102
Scoring by quarter: 26–29, 29–24, 22–29, 28–20
Pts: Billy Ray Bates 43	Pts: Ricardo Brown 29

Araneta Coliseum, Quezon City

=== Game 3 ===
Vintage

August 16

recap

Crispa Redmanizers 123, Great Taste Coffee Makers 128
Scoring by quarter: 33–30, 27–33, 34–32, 29–33
Pts: Billy Ray Bates 47, Abet Guidaben 27	Pts: Norman Black 35, Ricardo Brown 28

Araneta Coliseum, Quezon City

In a closely fought contest, Crispa import Billy Ray Bates got his fifth foul with 4:08 left in the game, the Redmanizers levelled the count for the last time at 115-all with 3:27 remaining, Bogs Adornado and Ricardo Brown unloaded a 6–0 bomb to put Great Taste ahead for good, 121–115 with two minutes left.

=== Game 4 ===
Vintage

August 18

Crispa Redmanizers 142, Great Taste Coffee Makers 113
Scoring by quarter: 31–26, 34–28, 33–26, 44–33
Pts: Billy Ray Bates 52, Abet Guidaben 30	Pts: Norman Black 42

Araneta Coliseum, Quezon City

From a 31–26 advantage for Crispa after the first period, Billy Ray Bates suddenly catch fire in the second quarter, back-to-back three-pointers and a fastbreak lay-up by Bates gave the Redmanizers a 50–32 lead. The Coffee Makers came within eight points, 76–84 in the third quarter, but Bates spearhead a 14–4 Crispa run that sent Great Taste reeling from the onslaught at the end of the crucial third period. Crispa blew the game wide open in the fourth quarter, leading by as many as 26 points, 125–99 with 3:14 left in the game.

=== Game 5 ===
Vintage

August 23

Crispa Redmanizers 139, Great Taste Coffee Makers 120
Scoring by quarter: 29–23, 34–26, 34–36, 42–35
Pts: Billy Ray Bates 50	Pts: Norman Black 45
Crispa wins series, 3–2

Araneta Coliseum, Quezon City

Crispa led 63–49 at halftime of the deciding fifth game, the Redmanizers padded their lead to 17 points, 76–59 in the third quarter, but the Coffee Makers countered with a 12–2 run to trimmed the deficit at 71–78 with 5:52 remaining, Atoy Co's turnaround jumper just before the buzzer sounded ending the third period put Crispa up front, 97–85. Great Taste were down by eight, 94–102, when Bernie Fabiosa got an easy inside basket and Bates hitting one from the left and Yoyoy Villamin making a follow-up shot as Crispa's lead were back to 14 points, 108–94, Billy Ray Bates was unstoppable as the Redmanizers answered every baskets the Coffee Makers made, Abet Guidaben finalized the count with an open lay-up for a 139–120 tally.

1983 PBA Reinforced Filipino Conference Champions

Crispa Redmanizers
11th title

== Rosters ==
Crispa Redmanizers roster
Players
Coaches

Pos.	No.	Nat.	Name	Ht.	Wt.
G/F	2	(United States)	Billy Ray Bates (I)	6 ft 3 in (1.91 m)	212 lb (96 kg)	Kentucky State
F/C	5	(Philippines)	Abet Guidaben	6 ft 5 in (1.96 m)	180 lb (82 kg)	USJ–R
G	6	(Philippines)	Fortunato Co, Jr	6 ft 1 in (1.85 m)	168 lb (76 kg)	Mapúa
G/F	7	(Philippines)	Arturo Cristobal	6 ft 1 in (1.85 m)	170 lb (77 kg)	Far Eastern
G/F	9	(Philippines)	Padim Israel	6 ft 3 in (1.91 m)	160 lb (73 kg)	Ateneo
F	10	(Philippines)	Freddie Hubalde	6 ft 1 in (1.85 m)	175 lb (79 kg)	Mapúa
F/C	13	(Philippines)	Elpidio Villamin	6 ft 2 in (1.88 m)	188 lb (85 kg)
G	14	(Philippines)	Tito Varela	6 ft 1 in (1.85 m)	165 lb (75 kg)	UE
G	15	(Philippines)	Bernie Fabiosa	5 ft 9 in (1.75 m)	160 lb (73 kg)	UE
F	16	(Philippines)	Angelito Esguerra	6 ft 3 in (1.91 m)	180 lb (82 kg)	Letran
F	18	(Philippines)	Philip Cezar	6 ft 3 in (1.91 m)	170 lb (77 kg)	José Rizal
G	24	(Philippines)	Ramon Cruz	5 ft 11 in (1.80 m)	155 lb (70 kg)	UE

Head coach

- (Philippines) Tommy Manotoc

Assistant coach(es)

- (Philippines) Narciso Bernardo

Legend

- (C) Team captain
- (I) Import
- Injured

Great Taste Coffee roster
Players
Coaches

Pos.	No.	Nat.	Name	Ht.	Wt.
F/C	1	(Philippines)	Manny Victorino	6 ft 5 in (1.96 m)	200 lb (91 kg)	José Rizal
G/F	2	(Philippines)	Alejo Alolor	6 ft 1 in (1.85 m)	160 lb (73 kg)	Visayas
F/C	6	(Philippines)	Joel Banal	6 ft 4 in (1.93 m)	163 lb (74 kg)	Mapúa
G	8	(Philippines)	Noel Guzman	5 ft 10 in (1.78 m)	165 lb (75 kg)	San Beda
G	10	(Philippines)	Eduardo Mendoza	6 ft 0 in (1.83 m)	165 lb (75 kg)	Visayas
C	11	(Philippines)	Florendo Ritualo	6 ft 3 in (1.91 m)	190 lb (86 kg)	Baguio
G	16	(Philippines)	Leonardo Paguntalan	6 ft 1 in (1.85 m)	182 lb (83 kg)	Western Institute of Technology (Philippines)
G	23	(United States)	Ricardo Brown	6 ft 0 in (1.83 m)	175 lb (79 kg)	Pepperdine
F	24	(United States)	Norman Black (I)	6 ft 5 in (1.96 m)	190 lb (86 kg)	Saint Joseph's
F	29	(Philippines)	Bernardo Carpio	6 ft 3 in (1.91 m)	188 lb (85 kg)	Ateneo
G/F	33	(Philippines)	Bogs Adornado	6 ft 1 in (1.85 m)	175 lb (79 kg)	UST
F	66	(Philippines)	Joey Marquez	6 ft 2 in (1.88 m)	175 lb (79 kg)	Angeles

Head coach

- (Philippines) Jimmy Mariano

Assistant coach(es)

- (Philippines) Nap Flores

Legend

- (C) Team captain
- (I) Import
- Injured

== Broadcast notes ==
Game	Play-by-play	Analyst
Game 1		
Game 2	Joe Cantada	Steve Kattan and Lauro Mumar
Game 3	Pinggoy Pengson	Andy Jao and Ramon Fernandez
Game 4		
Game 5	Pinggoy Pengson	Andy Jao and Steve Kattan
