= Bobby Parks PBA Best Import of the Conference award =

Award to non-Filipino basketball players

The Bobby Parks Philippine Basketball Association (PBA) Best Import of the Conference award (formerly known as the PBA Best Import of the Conference award) is given to the most outstanding non-Filipino on a team's roster, frequently referred to as the "import." Since imports are restricted to certain conferences, the award is a conference-long award, not a season-long award. The award was renamed on March 31, 2013, after Bobby Parks, a seven-time winner of this award who died a day before due to laryngeal cancer.

== Winners ==
Player (X)	Denotes the number of times the player has received the award
Team (X)	Denotes the number of times a player from this team has won

Season	Conference	Best Import	Team	Ref.
1981	Open	(United States) Andrew Fields	Toyota Super Diesels	
1981	Reinforced Filipino	(United States) Russell Murray	YCO-Tanduay	
1982	Reinforced Filipino	(United States) Norman Black	San Miguel Beermen	
1982	Open	(United States) Donnie Ray Koonce	Toyota Super Corollas (2)	
1983	Reinforced Filipino	(United States) Billy Ray Bates	Crispa Redmanizers	
1983	Open	(United States) Billy Ray Bates (2)	Crispa Redmanizers (2)	
1984	Invitational	(United States) Jeff Collins	Great Taste Coffee Makers	
1985	Open	(United States) Norman Black (2)	Magnolia Ice Cream Makers (2)	
1985	Reinforced	(United States) Michael Hackett	Ginebra San Miguel	
1986	Reinforced	(United States) Rob Williams	Tanduay Rhum Makers (2)	
1986	Open	(United States) Michael Young	Manila Beer Brewmasters	
1987	Open	(United States) David Thirdkill	Tanduay Rhum Makers (3)	
1987	Reinforced	(United States) Bobby Parks	San Miguel Beermen (3)	
1988	Open	(United States) Jamie Waller	Ginebra San Miguel (2)	
1988	Reinforced	(United States) Bobby Parks (2)	Shell Rimula X Diesel Oilers	
1989	Open	(United States) Bobby Parks (3)	Formula Shell Zoom Masters (2)	
1989	Reinforced	(United States) Carlos Briggs	Añejo Rum 65ers (3)	
1990	First Conference	(United States) Bobby Parks (4)	Formula Shell Zoom Masters (3)	
1990	Third Conference	(United States) Bobby Parks (5)	Shell Rimula X (4)	
1991	First Conference	(United States) Bobby Parks (6)	Shell Rimula X (5)	
1991	Third Conference	(United States) Wes Matthews	Ginebra San Miguel (4)	
1992	First Conference	(United States) Bobby Parks (7)	Shell Rimula X (6)	
1992	Third Conference	(United States) Tony Harris	Swift Mighty Meaty Hotdogs	
1993	Commissioner's	(United States) Ronnie Thompkins	Swift Mighty Meaty Hotdogs (2)	
1993	Governors'	(United States) Kenny Travis	San Miguel Beermen (4)	
1994	Commissioner's	(United States) Kenny Redfield	Purefoods Tender Juicy Hotdogs	
1994	Governors'	(United States) Ronnie Coleman	Pepsi Mega Bottlers	
1995	Commissioner's	(United States) Ronnie Grandison	Sunkist Orange Juicers (3)	
1995	Governors'	(United States) Stevin Smith	Sunkist Orange Juicers (4)	
1996	Commissioner's	(United States) Kenny Redfield (2)	Formula Shell Zoom Masters (7)	
1996	Governors'	(United States) Sean Chambers	Alaska Milkmen	
1997	Commissioner's	(United States) Jeff Ward	San Miguel Beermen (5)	
1997	Governors'	(United States) Larry Robinson	San Miguel Beermen (6)	
1998	Commissioner's	(United States) Devin Davis	Alaska Milkmen (2)	
1998	Governors'	(United States) Silas Mills	Mobiline Phone Pals (2)	
1999	Commissioner's	(United States) Terquin Mott	San Miguel Beermen (7)	
1999	Governors'	(United States) Lamont Strothers	San Miguel Beermen (8)	
2000	Commissioner's	(United States) Ansu Sesay	Sta. Lucia Realtors	
2000	Governors'	(United States) Derrick Brown	Purefoods Tender Juicy Hotdogs (2)	
2001	Commissioner's	(United States) Antonio Lang	Red Bull Thunder	
2001	Governors'	(United States) Damian Owens	Sta. Lucia Realtors (2)	
2002	Governors'	(United States) Derrick Brown (2)	Purefoods Tender Juicy Hotdogs (3)	
2002	Commissioner's	(United States) Jerald Honeycutt	Talk 'N Text Phone Pals (3)	
2003	Reinforced	(United States) Tee McClary	Coca-Cola Tigers	
(2004)	Fiesta	(United States) Victor Thomas	Red Bull Barako (2)	
2004–05	Fiesta	(United States) Jerald Honeycutt (2)	Talk 'N Text Phone Pals (4)	
2005–06	Fiesta	(United States) Marquin Chandler	Purefoods Chunkee Giants (4)	
2006–07	Fiesta	(United States) Rosell Ellis	Alaska Aces (3)	
2007–08	Fiesta	(United States) Chris Alexander	Barangay Ginebra Kings (5)	
2008–09	Fiesta	(United States) Gabe Freeman	San Miguel Beermen (9)	
2009–10	Fiesta	(United States) Gabe Freeman (2)	San Miguel Beermen (10)	
2010–11	Commissioner's	(United States) Nate Brumfield	Barangay Ginebra Kings (6)	
2010–11	Governors'	(United States) Arizona Reid	Rain or Shine Elasto Painters	
2011–12	Commissioner's	(United States) Denzel Bowles	B-Meg Llamados (5)	
2011–12	Governors'	(United States) Jamelle Cornley	Rain or Shine Elasto Painters (2)	
2012–13	Commissioner's	(United States) Robert Dozier	Alaska Aces (4)	
2012–13	Governors'	(United States) Marqus Blakely	San Mig Coffee Mixers (6)	
2013–14	Commissioner's	(United States) Richard Howell	Talk 'N Text Tropang Texters (5)	
2013–14	Governors'	(United States) Arizona Reid (2)	Rain or Shine Elasto Painters (3)	
2014–15	Commissioner's	(United States) Wayne Chism	Rain or Shine Elasto Painters (4)	
2014–15	Governors'	(United States) Romeo Travis	Alaska Aces (5)	
2015–16	Commissioner's	(United States) Arinze Onuaku	Meralco Bolts	
2015–16	Governors'	(United States) Allen Durham	Meralco Bolts (2)	
2016–17	Commissioner's	(United States) Charles Rhodes	San Miguel Beermen (11)	
2016–17	Governors'	(United States) Allen Durham (2)	Meralco Bolts (3)	
2017–18	Commissioner's	(United States) Justin Brownlee	Barangay Ginebra San Miguel (7)	
2017–18	Governors'	(United States) Mike Harris	Alaska Aces (6)	
2019	Commissioner's	(United States) Terrence Jones	TNT KaTropa (6)	
2019	Governors'	(United States) Allen Durham (3)	Meralco Bolts (4)	
2021	Governors'	(United States) Justin Brownlee (2)	Barangay Ginebra San Miguel (8)	
2022–23	Commissioner's	(United States) Justin Brownlee (3)	Barangay Ginebra San Miguel (9)	
2022–23	Governors'	(United States) Rondae Hollis-Jefferson	TNT Tropang Giga (7)	
2023–24	Commissioner's	(United States) Johnathan Williams	Phoenix Super LPG Fuel Masters	
2024–25	Governors'	(United States) Rondae Hollis-Jefferson (2)	TNT Tropang Giga (8)	
2024–25	Commissioner's	(United States) Rondae Hollis-Jefferson (3)	TNT Tropang Giga (9)	
2025–26	Commissioner's	(United States) Justin Brownlee (4)	Barangay Ginebra San Miguel (10)	

== Multiple-time winners ==
Total	Player
7	(United States) Bobby Parks
4	(United States) Justin Brownlee
3	(United States) Allen Durham
3	(United States) Rondae Hollis-Jefferson
2	(United States) Billy Ray Bates
2	(United States) Norman Black
2	(United States) Derrick Brown
2	(United States) Gabe Freeman
2	(United States) Jerald Honeycutt
2	(United States) Kenny Redfield
2	(United States) Arizona Reid
