= 1982 N-Rich Coffee Creamers season =

- Head coach: Jimmy Mariano
- Owner(s): CFC Corporation

Reinforced All-Filipino Conference results
- Record: 2–16 (11.1%)
- Place: 8th
- Playoff finish: N/A

Invitational Conference results
- Record: 0–0
- Place: N/A
- Playoff finish: N/A

Open Conference results
- Record: 17–11 (60.7%)
- Place: 4th
- Playoff finish: Semifinals

N-Rich Coffee Creamers seasons

The 1982 N-Rich Coffee Creamers season was the 8th season of the franchise in the Philippine Basketball Association (PBA). Known as Great Taste Coffee Makers in the Reinforced Filipino Conference.

== Transactions ==
Players Added	Signed	Former team
Ronnie Albor	Off-season	Finance
Mario Marasigan	Off-season	Finance
Leonardo Paguntalan	Off-season	San Miguel Beer
Ricardo Mariano	Off-season	Tefilin (disbanded)
Allan Abelgas ^{Rookie}	August 1982	N/A
Noel Guzman ^{Rookie}	August 1982	N/A

== Summary ==
Great Taste manage to win only two of their 18 games in the elimination phase of the Reinforced All-Filipino Conference, both in the first round against Mariwasa-Honda and Toyota. After back-to-back victories, the Coffee Makers lost all of their final 13 outings with import Perry Davis sitting out in their last five games because of an injury.

From a sour campaign of a last place finish, the erstwhile Great Taste Coffee Makers, now known as N-Rich for the Open Conference, come out strong in the last tournament of the season with Danny Salisbury and Rich Adams as their imports. N-Rich had an eye-popping start of a six-game sweep in Phase 1 of their 18-game schedule in the eliminations. The Coffee Creamers were tied with Gilbey’s Gin on top of the standings with 13 wins and five losses for an outright semifinals berth. Going into the last two playdates of the semifinals, N-Rich was a win away from their first-ever trip to the finals, but they lost to Gilbey’s and were forced into a playoff by Toyota Super Corollas. The Coffee Creamers blew their opportunity three times as they lost to the Super Corollas in the knockout game for the right to play Gilbey’s Gin in the final playoffs.

== Win-loss records vs Opponents ==
Teams	Win	Loss	1st (Reinforced)	3rd (Open)
Crispa Redmanizers	2	4	0-3	2-1
Mariwasa-Honda / Galerie Dominique	2	3	1-1	1-2
Gilbey’s Gin	2	5	0-3	2-2
San Miguel Beermen	5	5	0-2	5-3
Toyota Super Corollas	3	4	1-1	2-3
U-Tex Wranglers	2	3	0-3	2-0
YCO-Tanduay	3	3	0-3	3-0
Total	19	27	2-16	17-11

== Reinforced All-Filipino Conference roster ==
Great Taste Coffee roster
Players
Coaches

Pos.	No.	Nat.	Name	Ht.	Wt.
F/C	1	(Philippines)	Manny Victorino	6 ft 5 in (1.96 m)		José Rizal
F	5	(Philippines)	Ricardo Mariano	6 ft 0 in (1.83 m)		Mapúa
F/C	6	(Philippines)	Joel Banal	6 ft 3 in (1.91 m)		Mapúa
G	7	(Philippines)	Bienvenido Dela Cruz	6 ft 2 in (1.88 m)		Mindanao
F	8	(Philippines)	Filomeno Gulfin	6 ft 2 in (1.88 m)		Southwestern-U
G	10	(Philippines)	Eduardo Mendoza	6 ft 0 in (1.83 m)		Visayas
C	11	(Philippines)	Florendo Ritualo	6 ft 2 in (1.88 m)		Baguio
G	12	(Philippines)	Rafael Sison	6 ft 1 in (1.85 m)		Ateneo de Davao
F	14	(Philippines)	Jose Roslin	6 ft 2 in (1.88 m)		PCCr
G	15	(Philippines)	Mario Marasigan	5 ft 11 in (1.80 m)		UST
G	16	(Philippines)	Leonardo Paguntalan	6 ft 1 in (1.85 m)		Western Institute
G/F	17	(Philippines)	Woodrow Jaymalin	5 ft 10 in (1.78 m)		Philippine Christian
C	30	(United States)	Perry Davis (I)	6 ft 9 in (2.06 m)		Rhode Island
F	32	(Philippines)	Ronnie Albor	6 ft 2 in (1.88 m)		Southwestern-U
F	66	(Philippines)	Joey Marquez	6 ft 2 in (1.88 m)		Angeles

Head coach

- (Philippines) Jimmy Mariano

Assistant coach(es)

- (Philippines) Orly Bauzon

Legend

- (C) Team captain
- (I) Import
- Injured

== Open Conference roster ==
N-Rich Coffee Creamers roster
Players
Coaches

Pos.	No.	Nat.	Name	Ht.	Wt.
F/C	1	(Philippines)	Manny Victorino	6 ft 5 in (1.96 m)		José Rizal
F	5	(Philippines)	Ricardo Mariano	6 ft 0 in (1.83 m)		Mapúa
F/C	6	(Philippines)	Joel Banal	6 ft 3 in (1.91 m)		Mapúa
F	8	(Philippines)	Filomeno Gulfin	6 ft 2 in (1.88 m)		Southwestern-U
G	10	(Philippines)	Eduardo Mendoza	6 ft 0 in (1.83 m)		Visayas
C	11	(Philippines)	Florendo Ritualo	6 ft 2 in (1.88 m)		Baguio
G	12	(Philippines)	Rafael Sison	6 ft 1 in (1.85 m)		Ateneo de Davao
G	14	(Philippines)	Noel Guzman	5 ft 10 in (1.78 m)		San Beda
G	15	(Philippines)	Mario Marasigan	5 ft 11 in (1.80 m)		UST
G	16	(Philippines)	Leonardo Paguntalan	6 ft 1 in (1.85 m)		Western Institute
G/F	17	(Philippines)	Woodrow Jaymalin	5 ft 10 in (1.78 m)		Philippine Christian
F	31	(United States)	Danny Salisbury (I)	6 ft 5 in (1.96 m)		Texas–Pan American
C	32	(United States)	Rich Adams (I)	6 ft 9 in (2.06 m)		Illinois
F	33	(Philippines)	Ronnie Albor	6 ft 2 in (1.88 m)		Southwestern-U
G	34	(Philippines)	Allan Abelgas	5 ft 9 in (1.75 m)		USJ–R
F	66	(Philippines)	Joey Marquez	6 ft 2 in (1.88 m)		Angeles

Head coach

- (Philippines) Jimmy Mariano

Assistant coach(es)

- (Philippines) Orly Bauzon

Legend

- (C) Team captain
- (I) Import
- Injured
