= Terry Sykes =

American basketball player

Personal information
- Born: April 5, 1956 (age 70) Colfax, Louisiana, U.S.
- Listed height: 6 ft 7 in (2.01 m)
- Listed weight: 200 lb (91 kg)

Career information
- High school: Dry Prong (Dry Prong, Louisiana)
- College: Grambling State (1974–1978)
- NBA draft: 1978: 2nd round, 37th overall pick
- Drafted by: Washington Bullets
- Position: Power forward

Career history
- 1978–1979: Pallacanestro Chieti
- 1982: San Miguel Beermen
- Stats at Basketball Reference

Terrace Sykes (born April 5, 1956) is an American former professional basketball player. He played college basketball for the Grambling State Tigers. Sykes was a second-round selection by the Washington Bullets in the 1978 NBA draft but played professionally overseas.

== Biography ==
A native of Colfax, Louisiana, Sykes attended Dry Prong High School in nearby Dry Prong, and led the basketball team to a 2A State championship during his senior season. He played college basketball for the Grambling State Tigers with whom he led the Southwestern Athletic Conference (SWAC) in rebounding twice and was a three-time All-SWAC selection.

Sykes was selected by the Washington Bullets as the 37th overall pick in the 1978 NBA draft but he never played in the National Basketball Association (NBA). Instead, he played primarily in Europe. He played in the Philippine Basketball Association (PBA) with the San Miguel Beermen during the 1982 season.

== Legacy ==
Sykes was inducted into the Grambling Legends Hall of Fame in 2019.

== Personal life ==
Sykes' granddaughter, Mya Hollingshed, played college basketball for the Colorado Buffaloes and was selected by the Las Vegas Aces in the 2022 WNBA draft.

== Career statistics ==
Legend
GP	Games played	GS	Games started	MPG	Minutes per game
FG%	Field goal percentage	3P%	3-point field goal percentage	FT%	Free throw percentage
RPG	Rebounds per game	APG	Assists per game	SPG	Steals per game
BPG	Blocks per game	PPG	Points per game	**Bold**	Career high

=== College ===
Year	Team	GP	GS	MPG	FG%	3P%	FT%	RPG	APG	SPG	BPG	PPG
1977–78	Grambling State	23	–	–	.526	–	.706	11.0	–	–	–	23.8
Career		23	–	–	.526	–	.706	11.0	–	–	–	23.8
