= 1982 PBA season =

Eighth PBA season

- Duration: March 7 – December 14, 1982
- Teams: 8
- TV partner: Vintage Sports (City2)
- Season MVP: Ramon Fernandez (Toyota Super Corollas)
- Reinforced Filipino Conference champions: Toyota Super Corollas
- Reinforced Filipino Conference runners-up: San Miguel Beermen
- Invitational Conference champions: San Miguel Beermen
- Invitational Conference runners-up: Crispa Redmanizers
- Open Conference champions: Toyota Super Corollas
- Open Conference runners-up: Gilbey's Gin

Seasons
- ← 1981 1983 →

The 1982 PBA season was the eighth season of the Philippine Basketball Association (PBA).

== Board of governors ==
=== Executive committee ===
- Leopoldo L. Prieto (Commissioner)
- Domingo Y. Itchon (President, representing YCO-Tanduay)

=== Teams ===
Team	Company	Governor
Crispa Redmanizers	P. Floro and Sons	Virgilio A. Dalupan
Galerie Dominique Artists	Galerie Dominique	Anna Dominique Coseteng
Gilbey's Gin Tonics	La Tondeña Incorporada	Carlos Palanca III
Great Taste Coffee Makers	Consolidated Foods Corporation	Porfirio G. Zablan
San Miguel Beermen	San Miguel Corporation	Tomas L. Manotoc
Toyota Super Corollas	Delta Motor Corporation	Ricardo C. Silverio, Jr.
YCO-Tanduay	Elizalde & Company; Tanduay Distillers, Inc.	Johnny Jose
U/Tex Wranglers	Universal Textile Mills	Walter Euyang

== Season highlights ==
- The start of the year saw the league's membership reduced from 10 teams to just 8, following the disbandment of CDCP and Tefilin franchises.
- Vintage Enterprises Inc. took over the league's television coverage beginning this season.
- The PBA implement for the first time a playoff post-eliminations format with a series of best-of-three quarterfinals, best-of-five semifinals and best-of-seven finals to determine the champion in the Reinforced Filipino Conference.
- Toyota Super Corollas won two championships in the year, capped by center Ramon Fernandez winning his first Most Valuable Player Award.
- San Miguel Beer won the Invitational championship over Crispa Redmanizers for the franchise' 2nd PBA title.
- Baby Dalupan resigned as Crispa head coach after the Redmanizers got eliminated in the third conference. This season became the second time the multi-titled ballclub did not win any championship.
- Leo Prieto and Domingo Itchon stepped down as the league commissioner and board president respectively at the end of the season.

== All-Star series ==
A PBA North vs South All-Star series were held in Cebu City and Manila. The North and South team split their two-game series. Emerging as the All-Star MVP was Toyota's Arnie Tuadles, who scored 50 points in the first match.

== Opening ceremonies ==
The muses for the participating teams are as follows:

Team	Muse
Crispa Redmanizers	Sharon Cuneta, Jackie Lou Blanco and Joyce Ann Burton
Gilbey's Gin	Jane Destree and Beth de Mesa
Great Taste Discoverers	Sharon Eddiston
Mariwasa-Honda TMXers	Tina Maristela
San Miguel Beermen	Maya Mahtani
Toyota Super Corollas	Vivian Veloso
U/Tex Wranglers	Rio Locsin
YCO-Tanduay	Maridol Cagdac/Alta Tan/Rosanna Zamora/Nitz Bernardez

== Champions ==
- Reinforced Filipino Conference: Toyota Super Corollas
- Invitational Conference: San Miguel Beermen
- Open Conference: Toyota Super Corollas
- Team with best win–loss percentage: San Miguel Beermen (40-26, .606)
- Best Team of the Year: Toyota Super Corollas (4th & Final)

== Reinforced Filipino Conference ==
=== Elimination round ===
Pos	Team	W	L	PCT	GB	Qualification
1	San Miguel Beermen	13	5	.722	—	Advance to semifinals
2	Crispa Redmanizers	12	6	.667	1	Advance to semifinals
3	Gilbey's Gin	11	7	.611	2	Proceed to quarterfinals
4	Toyota Super Corollas	10	8	.556	3	Proceed to quarterfinals
5	YCO-Tanduay	9	9	.500	4	Proceed to quarterfinals
6	U-Tex Wranglers	8	10	.444	5	Proceed to quarterfinals
7	Mariwasa-Honda TMXers	7	11	.389	6	
8	Great Taste Coffee Makers	2	16	.111	11	

=== Playoffs ===
Quarterfinals (Best-of-3)
3	Gilbey's	0
6	U-Tex	2
4	Toyota	2
5	YCO-Tanduay	0

Semifinals (Best-of-5)
1	San Miguel	3
6	U-Tex	1
2	Crispa	2
4	Toyota	3

Finals (Best-of-7)
1	San Miguel	3
4	Toyota	4

=== Finals ===
Team 1	Series	Team 2	Game 1	Game 2	Game 3	Game 4	Game 5	Game 6	Game 7
(1) San Miguel Beermen	3–4	(4) Toyota Super Corollas	120–110	119–117	87–90	96–98	96–88	99–110	95–101

- Best Import of the Conference: Norman Black (Magnolia)

== Invitational championship ==
=== Elimination round ===
Pos	Team	W	L	PCT	GB	Qualification
1	San Miguel Beermen	3	1	.750	—	Advance to the finals
2	Crispa Redmanizers	3	1	.750	—	Advance to the finals
3	Nicholas Stoodley (South Korea national team) (G)	2	2	.500	1	Proceed to third-place playoff
4	Toyota Super Corollas	2	2	.500	1	Proceed to third-place playoff
5	U-Tex Wranglers	0	4	.000	3	

(G) Guests

=== Third-place playoffs ===
Team 1	Series	Team 2	Game 1	Game 2	Game 3
(3) South Korea	2–0	(4) Toyota Super Corollas	115–107	142–107	—

=== Finals ===
Team 1	Series	Team 2	Game 1	Game 2	Game 3
(1) San Miguel Beermen	2–1	(2) Crispa Redmanizers	102–96	104–110	103–102

== Open Conference ==
=== Elimination round ===
Pos	Team	W	L	PCT	GB	Qualification
1	N-Rich Coffee Creamers	13	5	.722	—	Advance to semifinal round
2	Gilbey's Gin	13	5	.722	—	Advance to semifinal round
3	YCO-Tanduay	11	7	.611	2	Proceed to quarterfinal round
4	San Miguel Beermen	10	8	.556	3	Proceed to quarterfinal round
5	Toyota Super Corollas	8	10	.444	5	Proceed to quarterfinal round
6	U-Tex Wranglers	8	10	.444	5	Proceed to quarterfinal round
7	Crispa Redmanizers	6	12	.333	7	
8	Galerie Dominique Artists	3	15	.167	10	

=== Quarterfinal round ===
Pos	Team	W	L	PCT	GB	Qualification
3	Toyota Super Corollas	2	1	.667	—	Semifinal round
4	San Miguel Beermen	2	1	.667	—	Semifinal round
5	YCO-Tanduay	1	2	.333	1	
6	U-Tex Wranglers	1	2	.333	1	

=== Semifinal round ===
Pos	Team	W	L	PCT	GB	Qualification
1	Gilbey's Gin	4	2	.667	—	Advance to the Finals
2	Toyota Super Corollas	3	3	.500 (Note: Second-seed playoff: Toyota 114–87 N-Rich)	1	Advance to the Finals
3	N-Rich Coffee Creamers	3	3	.500	1	Proceed to third place playoff
4	San Miguel Beermen	2	4	.333	2	Proceed to third place playoff

=== Finals ===
Team 1	Series	Team 2	Game 1	Game 2	Game 3
(1) Gilbey's Gin	0–3	(2) Toyota Super Corollas	100–108	107–121	109–122

- Best Import of the Conference: Donnie Ray Koonce (Toyota)

== Awards ==
- Most Valuable Player: Ramon Fernandez (Toyota)
- Rookie of the Year: Marte Saldaña (San Miguel)
- Best Import-Reinforced Conference: Norman Black (San Miguel)
- Best Import-Open Conference: Donnie Ray Koonce (Toyota)
- Mythical Five:
  - Francis Arnaiz (Toyota)
  - Atoy Co (Crispa)
  - Ramon Fernandez (Toyota)
  - Bogs Adornado (U/Tex)
  - Abe King (Toyota)

== Cumulative standings ==
Team	GP	W	L	PCT
San Miguel Beermen	66	40	26	.606
Gilbey's Gin	47	28	19	.596
Toyota Super Corollas	69	38	31	.551
Crispa Redmanizers	54	28	26	.518
YCO-Tanduay	41	21	20	.512
Great Taste/N-Rich Coffee Creamers	46	19	27	.413
U/Tex Wranglers	55	22	33	.400
Mariwasa-Honda/Galerie Dominique Artists	36	10	26	.278
