= 1982 San Miguel Beermen season =

- Head coach: Tommy Manotoc
- Owner: San Miguel Corporation

Reinforced All-Filipino Conference results
- Record: 19–10 (65.5%)
- Place: 2nd
- Playoff finish: Finals (lost to Toyota)

Invitational Conference results
- Record: 5–2 (71.4%)
- Place: 1st
- Playoff finish: Champions (def. Crispa)

Open Conference results
- Record: 16–14 (53.3%)
- Place: 3rd
- Playoff finish: Semifinals

San Miguel Beermen seasons

The 1982 San Miguel Beermen season was the 8th season of the franchise in the Philippine Basketball Association (PBA)

== Transactions ==
Players Added	Signed	Former team
Anthony Dasalla	Off-season	CDCP (disbanded)
Renato Lobo	Off-season	CDCP (disbanded)
Manny Paner	Off-season	CDCP (disbanded)
Renato Kabigting ^{Rookie}	Off-season	N/A
Marte Saldaña ^{Rookie}	Off-season	N/A
Kenneth Yap ^{Rookie}	Off-season	N/A

== Awards ==
- Marte Saldana was named the season's Rookie of the Year.
- Norman Black was voted the Reinforced Filipino Conference Best Import.

== Summary ==
San Miguel had signed up Norman Black, who played for the disbanded Tefilin ballclub in the previous conference from last season, as their import for all three conferences of the 1982 PBA season. The Beermen emerge with the best record in the elimination phase of the Reinforced Filipino Conference with 13 wins and five losses. San Miguel went on to play the U/tex Wranglers in the best-of-five semifinal series, winning three games to one, to enter the finals against the Toyota Super Corollas. The Beermen led the series by winning the first two games, but Toyota came back to win the championship that went to a full limit of seven games.

In the five-team Asian Invitational Championship that includes a visiting squad from South Korea, the Beermen were on their second straight finals appearance in the season, they played the Crispa Redmanizers in the best-of-three title series. San Miguel beat Crispa, 103–102, in the deciding third game to win the Invitational title and their second PBA crown.

Norman Black would teamed up with Terry Sykes in the Open Conference. Sykes was replaced by Marvin Johnson after the Beermen lost their first two games. Johnson played five games in the elimination phase until former import Aaron James was recalled back and played together with Norman Black for the rest of the conference. San Miguel finish the elimination phase with 10 wins and eight losses and advances to the semifinal round along with Toyota and early qualifiers N-Rich Coffee and Gilbey's by posting a 2-1 won-loss slate in the quarterfinal round and winning their do-or-die encounter with U/tex. In the semifinal round, the Beermen lost to Gilbey's Gin, 101–102, in their last assignment on December 7 and failed to create a four-way tie for the two finals berth.

== Won-loss records vs Opponents ==
Team	Win	Loss	1st (Reinforced)	2nd (Invitational)	3rd (Open)
Crispa Redmanizers	8	1	3-0	3-1	2–0
Mariwasa-Honda / Galerie Dominique	4	0	2-0	N/A	2–0
Gilbey's Gin	3	5	2-1	N/A	1–4
Great Taste / N-Rich Coffee	5	5	2-0	N/A	3–5
Toyota Super Corollas	8	8	4-5	1-0	3-3
U-Tex Wranglers	8	4	4-3	1-0	3–1
YCO-Tanduay	4	2	2-1	N/A	2–1
Korea (Guest squad)	0	1	N/A	0-1	N/A
Total	40	26	19-10	5-2	16-14

== Roster ==
1982 San Miguel Beermen roster
Players

Pos.	#	POB	Name	Height	Weight	DOB (YYYY–MM–DD)	From
G	1	(Philippines)	Lim Eng Beng	5 ft 11 in (1.80 m)			De La Salle
F/C	5	(Philippines)	Jesus Migalbin	6 ft 3 in (1.91 m)			San Agustin
G/F	6	(Philippines)	Biboy Ravanes	6 ft 1 in (1.85 m)			Cebu
G	7	(Philippines)	Marte Saldaña	5 ft 11 in (1.80 m)			Far Eastern
F	8	(Philippines)	Renato Lobo	6 ft 2 in (1.88 m)			Far Eastern
F/C	9	(Philippines)	Eduardo Dizon	6 ft 2 in (1.88 m)			José Rizal
F	13	(Philippines)	Manny Paner	6 ft 2 in (1.88 m)			Visayas
G	14	(Philippines)	Yoyong Martirez	5 ft 8 in (1.73 m)			Southwestern-U
F/C	15	(Philippines)	Rodolfo Lalota	6 ft 3 in (1.91 m)			Mapúa
F/C	17	(Philippines)	Kenneth Yap	6 ft 2 in (1.88 m)			De La Salle
G/F	22	(Philippines)	Ray Obias	5 ft 11 in (1.80 m)			UST
G	34	(Philippines)	Renato Kabigting	6 ft 1 in (1.85 m)			Ateneo
F/C	99	(Philippines)	Anthony Dasalla	6 ft 3 in (1.91 m)			Far Eastern
F	24	(United States)	Norman Black (I)	6 ft 5 in (1.96 m)			Saint Joseph's
F/C	10	(United States)	Terry Sykes (I)	6 ft 7 in (2.01 m)			Grambling State
F/C	21	(United States)	Marvin Johnson (I)	6 ft 8 in (2.03 m)			New Mexico
F/C	23	(United States)	Aaron James (I)	6 ft 8 in (2.03 m)			Grambling State

Coaches

Head coach

- (Philippines) Tommy Manotoc

Assistant coach(es)

Legend

- (C) Team captain
- (I) Import
- Injured

=== Trades ===
August 1982	To U-Tex Wranglers Alex Tan	To San Miguel Beermen Lim Eng Beng
