= 1982 Gilbey's Gin season =

- Head coach: Arturo Valenzona
- Owner(s): La Tondeña Incorporada

Reinforced All-Filipino Conference results
- Record: 11–9 (55%)
- Place: 5th
- Playoff finish: Quarterfinals

Invitational Conference results
- Record: 0–0
- Place: N/A
- Playoff finish: N/A

Open Conference results
- Record: 17–10 (63%)
- Place: 2nd
- Playoff finish: Finals (lost to Toyota)

Gilbey's Gin seasons

The 1982 Gilbey's Gin season was the 4th season of the franchise in the Philippine Basketball Association (PBA).

== Transactions ==
Rookies	Signed	Last MICAA team
Rolando Buhay	Off-season	N/A
Rudy Garcia	Off-season	APCOR
Conrado Pasco	Off-season	APCOR
Jerry Pingoy	Off-season	APCOR

== Summary ==
Gilbey's Gin has signed up former Presto import Lew Massey from last season as their reinforcement in the Reinforced Filipino Conference. The Gins finish third behind San Miguel Beer and Crispa after 18 games in the elimination phase, they were swept in two games by U/Tex Wranglers in their best-of-three quarterfinal series.

Massey return in the Open Conference, together with new recruit Rickey Brown, a Portland Trail Blazers third round draft pick in 1977, who was replaced after three games by Larry McNeill, the Gins resident import for the past three years. Gilbey's were tied with N-Rich Coffee on top of the standings with 13 wins and 5 losses and advances to the semifinal round outright.

=== Finals stint ===
The high-scoring duo of Massey and McNeill led Gilbey's to their first championship appearance in four years of participation. On December 7, Gilbey's escape with a 102-101 win over San Miguel Beermen to gain first entry in the title playoffs. N-Rich and Toyota dispute the second finals seat in a playoff match won by the Super Corollas.

Gilbey's got swept in three games by the powerhouse Toyota ballclub in the finals series.

== Scoring record ==
March 25: Lew Massey surpass the previous all-time one-game scoring record of 75 points set by Harry Rogers in 1976 while playing for 7-Up by tallying 85 points, converting 36-of-70 attempts from the field in Gilbey's 123-126 loss to Crispa. Massey scored 23, 16, 24 and 22 in each of four quarters.

== Won-loss records vs Opponents ==
Teams	Win	Loss	1st (Reinforced)	3rd (Open)
Crispa Redmanizers	3	2	0-2	3-0
Mariwasa-Honda / Galerie Dominique	5	1	2-1	3-0
Great Taste / N-Rich Coffee	5	2	3-0	2-2
San Miguel Beermen	5	3	1-2	4-1
Toyota Super Corollas	5	5	2-1	3-4
U-Tex Wranglers	3	3	2-2	1-1
YCO-Tanduay	2	3	1-1	1-2
Total	28	19	11-9	17-10

== Roster ==
1982 Gilbey's Gin roster
Players

Pos.	#	POB	Name	Height	Weight	DOB (YYYY–MM–DD)	From
G	1	(Philippines)	Joseph Herrera	6 ft 0 in (1.83 m)			Letran
F	5	(Philippines)	Rudy Garcia	6 ft 0 in (1.83 m)
G/F	6	(Philippines)	Conrado Pasco	6 ft 2 in (1.88 m)			Far Eastern
F	8	(Philippines)	Marlowe Jacutin	6 ft 0 in (1.83 m)			Visayas
F/C	10	(Philippines)	Eduardo Ducut	6 ft 5 in (1.96 m)			Letran
F	12	(Philippines)	Valerio Delos Santos	6 ft 2 in (1.88 m)			Far Eastern
G/F	15	(Philippines)	Alex Clariño	6 ft 2 in (1.88 m)			Lyceum
F/C	17	(Philippines)	Eusebio Del Rosario	6 ft 2 in (1.88 m)			UE
F/C	18	(Philippines)	Nathaniel Castillo	6 ft 2 in (1.88 m)			Letran
F	20	(Philippines)	Rolando Buhay	6 ft 3 in (1.91 m)			NCBA
G	21	(Philippines)	Jerry Pingoy	5 ft 10 in (1.78 m)			Visayas
G	24	(Philippines)	Wilfredo Generalao	5 ft 8 in (1.73 m)			Visayas
G/F	23	(United States)	Lew Massey (I)	6 ft 5 in (1.96 m)			North Carolina
C	20	(United States)	Rickey Brown (I)	6 ft 9 in (2.06 m)			Mississippi State
C	31	(United States)	Larry McNeill (I)	6 ft 9 in (2.06 m)			Marquette

Coaches

Head coach

- (Philippines) Arturo Valenzona

Assistant coach(es)

Legend

- (C) Team captain
- (I) Import
- Injured
