= 1982 Crispa Redmanizers season =

- Head coach: Baby Dalupan
- Owners: P. Floro and Sons, Inc.

Reinforced All-Filipino Conference results
- Record: 18–11 (62.1%)
- Place: 3rd
- Playoff finish: Semifinals

Invitational Conference results
- Record: 4–3 (57.1%)
- Place: 2nd
- Playoff finish: Finals (lost to SMB)

Open Conference results
- Record: 6–12 (33.3%)
- Place: 7th
- Playoff finish: N/A

Crispa Redmanizers seasons

The 1982 Crispa Redmanizers season was the 8th season of the franchise in the Philippine Basketball Association (PBA).

== Colors ==
Crispa Redmanizers (Reinforced All-Filipino Conference)
(dark)
(light)
Crispa Redmanizers (Invitational Conference)
(dark)
(light)
Crispa 400 Redmanizers (Open Conference)
(dark)
(light)

== Summary ==
The Crispa Redmanizers were reinforced by CBA veteran Glenn Hagan, who played briefly for the Detroit Pistons in the NBA in 1981. The Redmanizers lost to Toyota, 110–111, at the start of the league's 8th season on March 7. After 18 games in the elimination phase, Crispa advanced to the semifinals outright with a 12–6 win-loss card and a game behind league-leading San Miguel Beer. The Redmanizers and the Toyota Super Corollas renewed their rivalry in a best-of-five semifinal series. Crispa were ahead two games to one but lost the last two games of the series as Toyota came back with victories in Games four and five.

In the Asian Invitational Championship, the Redmanizers played opposite first conference runner-up San Miguel in the finals. Both teams finished with identical 3-win, 1-loss slate in the five-team field. Crispa lost in the best-of-three title series where the Beermen battled back from a nine-point deficit in the final quarter of the deciding third game to win by a point, 103-102.

After losing two of their first three games in the Open Conference, the Redmanizers replaced their imports Mike Schultz and Clarence Kea in favor of James Wright and former Great Taste import Lewis Brown. Wright was also sent home and their fifth reinforcement Mike Gibson arrived and played eight games. Crispa ended up with its worst finish in franchise history by placing seventh and winning just six out of 18 games in the elimination phase.

On November 13, Crispa beat Toyota, 105-103 in overtime, in what turned out to be coach Baby Dalupan's final game as the Redmanizers head mentor. Both teams played without their imports as the Super Corollas opted not to use their two imports while Crispa's two reinforcements left the squad before their last game of the season. Coach Baby Dalupan resigned as head coach of the Redmanizers after the conference, leaving the team he won nine championships, including a Grandslam in 1976, in an eight-year coaching stint from 1975 to 1982.

== Won-loss records vs Opponents ==
| Team | Win | Loss | 1st (Reinforced) | 2nd (Invitational) | 3rd (Open) |
|---|---|---|---|---|---|
| Mariwasa-Honda / Galerie Dominique | 3 | 2 | 2-1 | N/A | 1–1 |
| Gilbey's Gin | 2 | 3 | 2-0 | N/A | 0–3 |
| Great Taste / N-Rich Coffee | 4 | 2 | 3-0 | N/A | 1–2 |
| San Miguel Beermen | 1 | 8 | 0–3 | 1–3 | 0–2 |
| Toyota Super Corollas | 5 | 7 | 3–5 | 1-0 | 1–2 |
| U-Tex Wranglers | 9 | 3 | 6-2 | 1-0 | 2-1 |
| YCO-Tanduay | 3 | 1 | 2-0 | N/A | 1–1 |
| Korea (Guest squad) | 1 | 0 | N/A | 1–0 | N/A |
| Total | 28 | 26 | 18-11 | 4-3 | 6–12 |

== Roster ==
Crispa Redmanizers roster
Players
Coaches

| Pos. | No. | Nat. | Name | Ht. | Wt. |
|---|---|---|---|---|---|---|
| F/C | 5 | (Philippines) | Abet Guidaben | 6 ft 5 in (1.96 m) | | USJ–R |
| G | 6 | (Philippines) | Fortunato Co, Jr | 6 ft 1 in (1.85 m) | | Mapúa |
| G/F | 8 & 7 | (Philippines) | Arturo Cristobal | 6 ft 1 in (1.85 m) | | Far Eastern |
| G/F | 9 | (Philippines) | Padim Israel | 6 ft 3 in (1.91 m) | | Ateneo |
| F | 10 | (Philippines) | Freddie Hubalde | 6 ft 1 in (1.85 m) | | Mapúa |
| F/C | 13 | (Philippines) | Elpidio Villamin | 6 ft 2 in (1.88 m) |
| G | 14 | (Philippines) | Ramon Cruz | 5 ft 11 in (1.80 m) | | UE |
| G | 15 | (Philippines) | Bernie Fabiosa | 5 ft 9 in (1.75 m) | | UE |
| C | 17 | (Philippines) | Romulo Mamaril | 6 ft 6 in (1.98 m) | | Mapúa |
| F/C | 18 | (Philippines) | Philip Cezar | 6 ft 3 in (1.91 m) | | José Rizal |
| G | 19 | (Philippines) | Rudy Distrito | 5 ft 11 in (1.80 m) | | UE |
| F | 23 | (Philippines) | Bernardo Carpio | 6 ft 3 in (1.91 m) | | Ateneo |
| G/F | 12 | (United States) | Glenn Hagan (I) | 6 ft 1 in (1.85 m) | | St. Bonaventure |
| F/C | 3 | (United States) | Clarence Kea (I) | 6 ft 9 in (2.06 m) | | Lamar |
| C | 33 | (United States) | Mike Schultz (I) | 6 ft 10 in (2.08 m) | | Houston |
| C | 11 | (United States) | Lewis Brown (I) | 6 ft 11 in (2.11 m) | | UNLV |
| F/C | 33 | (United States) | James Wright (I) | 6 ft 8 in (2.03 m) | | Rhode Island |
| C | 25 | (United States) | Mike Gibson (I) | 6 ft 10 in (2.08 m) | | USC Upstate |

Head coach

- (Philippines) Baby Dalupan

Assistant coach(es)

Legend

- (C) Team captain
- (I) Import
- Injured
