= 1982 Galerie Dominique Artists season =

- Head coach: Alejandrito Miego

Reinforced All-Filipino Conference results
- Record: 7–11 (38.9%)
- Place: 7th
- Playoff finish: N/A

Invitational Conference results
- Record: 0–0
- Place: N/A
- Playoff finish: N/A

Open Conference results
- Record: 3–15 (16.7%)
- Place: 8th
- Playoff finish: N/A

Galerie Dominique Artists seasons

The 1982 Galerie Dominique Artists season was the 8th season of the franchise in the Philippine Basketball Association (PBA). Known as Mariwasa-Honda TMXers in the Reinforced Filipino Conference.

== Transactions ==
Players Added	Signed	Former team
Jaime Javier	Off-season	Crispa
Antonio Torrente	Off-season	San Miguel Beer
Ernesto Estrada	Off-season	Presto
Woodrow Balani ^{Rookie}	August 1982	N/A
Joel Guzman ^{Rookie}	August 1982	N/A

== Summary ==
Mariwasa-Honda won their first two games of the season, returning import James Robinson scored 34 points as Mariwasa-Honda pulled an opening day upset win against last year's losing finalists U/Tex Wranglers, 97–95. The TMXers scored another surprise win in their next outing against Toyota, 116–100. Mariwasa-Honda lost a chance to forge a tie with U/Tex Wranglers for the last quarterfinals berth when they bowed to Gilbey's Gin, 116–122, on the final playing date of the elimination phase on June 8.

The team change its name to Galerie Dominique in the Open Conference. The Artists scored their first win after four losses on September 12, defeating the Crispa Redmanizers, 114–107, with new import 6–9 Micah Blunt replacing the injured James Robinson. Blunt team up with Kenny Barnes for the rest of the conference. The Artists won only three out of 18 games in the eliminations and ended up last.

== Won-loss records vs Opponents ==
Teams	Win	Loss	1st (Reinforced)	3rd (Open)
Crispa Redmanizers	2	3	1–2	1-1
Gilbey's Gin	1	5	1–2	0–3
Great Taste / N-Rich Coffee	3	2	1-1	2–1
San Miguel Beermen	0	4	0–2	0–2
Toyota Super Corollas	1	4	1-1	0–3
U-Tex Wranglers	2	4	2-1	0–3
YCO-Tanduay	1	4	1–2	0–2
Total	10	26	7–11	3–15

== Reinforced All-Filipino Conference roster ==
Mariwasa-Honda roster
Players
Coaches

Pos.	No.	Nat.	Name	Ht.	Wt.
F	3	(United States)	James Robinson (I)	6 ft 4 in (1.93 m)		Fresno State
F	6	(Philippines)	Ernesto Estrada	5 ft 11 in (1.80 m)		Visayas
G	7	(Philippines)	Antonio Torrente	6 ft 1 in (1.85 m)
G	8	(Philippines)	Teofilo Dela Cruz	5 ft 11 in (1.80 m)		Southwestern-U
C	10	(Philippines)	Jaime Javier	6 ft 4 in (1.93 m)		José Rizal
G	14	(Philippines)	Jesse Sullano	5 ft 9 in (1.75 m)		Southwestern-U
G/F	17	(Philippines)	Roberto Poblete	6 ft 3 in (1.91 m)		Adamson
G/F	18	(Philippines)	Alejo Alolor	6 ft 1 in (1.85 m)		Visayas
G	22	(Philippines)	Francisco Natividad	6 ft 1 in (1.85 m)		UST
G	23	(Philippines)	Oliveros Dalman	6 ft 3 in (1.91 m)		Visayas
C	45	(Philippines)	Redentor Vicente	6 ft 5 in (1.96 m)		José Rizal
F	64	(Philippines)	Monico Martinez	6 ft 2 in (1.88 m)		PSBA

Head coach

- (Philippines) Alejandrito Miego

Assistant coach(es)

Legend

- (C) Team captain
- (I) Import
- Injured

== Open Conference roster ==
Galerie Dominique roster
Players
Coaches

Pos.	No.	Nat.	Name	Ht.	Wt.
G	7	(Philippines)	Antonio Torrente	6 ft 1 in (1.85 m)
G	8	(Philippines)	Teofilo Dela Cruz	5 ft 11 in (1.80 m)		Southwestern-U
C	10	(Philippines)	Jaime Javier	6 ft 4 in (1.93 m)		José Rizal
G	14	(Philippines)	Jesse Sullano	5 ft 9 in (1.75 m)		Southwestern-U
G	16	(Philippines)	Joel Guzman	5 ft 10 in (1.78 m)		San Beda
G/F	17	(Philippines)	Roberto Poblete	6 ft 3 in (1.91 m)		Adamson
G/F	18	(Philippines)	Alejo Alolor	6 ft 1 in (1.85 m)		Visayas
F	21	(United States)	James Robinson (I)	6 ft 4 in (1.93 m)		Fresno State
G	22	(Philippines)	Francisco Natividad	6 ft 1 in (1.85 m)		UST
G	23	(Philippines)	Oliveros Dalman	6 ft 3 in (1.91 m)		Visayas
F	25	(United States)	Kenny Barnes (I)	6 ft 8 in (2.03 m)		Fresno State
F	26	(Philippines)	Woodrow Balani	6 ft 3 in (1.91 m)		Visayas
C	45	(Philippines)	Redentor Vicente	6 ft 5 in (1.96 m)		José Rizal
C	50	(United States)	Micah Blunt (I)	6 ft 9 in (2.06 m)		Tulane University
F	64	(Philippines)	Monico Martinez	6 ft 2 in (1.88 m)		PSBA

Head coach

- (Philippines) Alejandrito Miego

Assistant coach(es)

Legend

- (C) Team captain
- (I) Import
- Injured
