= Danny Salisbury =

American basketball player

Personal information
- Born: February 13, 1957 (age 69) Temple, Texas, U.S.
- Listed height: 6 ft 6 in (1.98 m)
- Listed weight: 210 lb (95 kg)

Career information
- College: Temple College (1975–1977); Texas–Rio Grande Valley (1977–1979)
- NBA draft: 1979: 2nd round, 28th overall pick
- Drafted by: Golden State Warriors
- Position: Small forward
- Number: 31
- Stats at Basketball Reference

Danny Salisbury (born February 13, 1957) is an American former professional basketball player out of Pan American. In 1977–78, he transferred to the Broncs after his sophomore year in junior college and posted norms of 15.7 points and 8.3 rebounds in his initial campaign. Salisbury was selected by Golden State on the second round in 1979, the 28th choice in the entire NBA college grab-bag. He made the Warriors 18-man pre-season roster and was given a Golden State uniform number 31. He turned out to be another hard-luck kid whose name was deleted when the regular season started.

Salisbury attempted a second crack at the NBA. Attending the San Antonio trials after his Utica stint in the Continental Basketball Association. Landed a berth on the Spurs' 16-man 1980 pre-season roster as a free agent but was released before the start of the regular campaign for a second time. Subsequently, reverted to the CBA with the Atlantic City Hi-Rollers.

In 1982, he played in the Philippines as an import for the Great Taste Coffee Makers, then known as N-Rich Coffee Creamers, in the Philippine Basketball Association Open Conference, teaming up with fellow NBA draftee Rich Adams, and leading the team to a league-best 13–5 record. They would lose, however, to eventual champion Toyota Super Corollas in the semifinals, eventually placing fourth in the season-ending tournament.
