= Micah Blunt =

American basketball player

Personal information
- Born: New Orleans, Louisiana
- Listed height: 6 ft 9 in (2.06 m)
- Listed weight: 210 lb (95 kg)

Career information
- High school: East Jefferson (Metairie, Louisiana)
- College: Tulane (1978–1982)
- NBA draft: 1982: 8th round, 182nd overall pick
- Drafted by: Los Angeles Lakers
- Playing career: 1982–1992
- Position: Center

Career history
- 1982: Galerie Dominique
- 1984: Plymouth Raiders
- 198 4–1985 =1985-1986 Years 1 Manchester United (Mancgester, England): Evansville Thunder
- 1986: Calderdale Explorers 1989-1990 Kingston Kings (London England)

Career highlights
- McDonald's All-American (1978); Second-team Parade All-American (1978)
- Stats at Basketball Reference

Micah Blunt is a retired American professional basketball player.

== Background ==
The 6–9, 210-pound native of New Orleans was a product of Tulane University.

== Basketball career ==
Blunt was the Los Angeles Lakers eighth round pick in the 1982 National Basketball Association (NBA) draft. He never made it to the Lakers official roster with only first pick James Worthy working his way up to earn a spot with the Los Angeles Lakers. He also, had stints with the Los Angeles Clippers and Cleveland Cavaliers.

Micah J. Blunt, father, mentor, coach, and non-profit founder of I.N.S.P.I.R.E. RR, Inc., is a native of New Orleans, Louisiana. He graduated from East Jefferson High School and was the first player selected in Louisiana to be named to the distinguished McDonalds Top- Twenty High School All-American Basketball Team. He attended Tulane University on a full athletic scholarship while Captain of the men's basketball team and earned his Bachelor of Science degree in education. Upon graduating from Tulane, he was drafted by the NBA World Champion Los Angeles Lakers in 1982.

After a brief stint in the NBA and CBA, he continued a ten-year professional basketball career in Europe where he won 5 championships in one season (European Guinness Book of World Records) while playing in the United Kingdom (England, Italy and France and reigning MVP of the English Professional Basketball League. Upon his return to the United States, Micah embarked onto an NCAA-Div. I collegiate coaching career having coached Men and Women's Basketball at three universities; Fairleigh- Dickinson University and CSUS- Sacramento State (Men) and George Mason University (Women) Basketball Coach. During his coaching tenure, his men's team (FDU) played in the postseason NIT, and the GMU women's team finished as conference champion runner-up.

Micah has worked in Human Resources, Management, and Leadership for the past 20 years. He has worked as a director, manager, and HR generalist in a number of fields, such as logistics and distribution centers, the poultry industry, corporate HR, food service, manufacturing, healthcare, and gaming. His wide range of skills and experience make him fit for working with people and organizations in the human capital industry.

Micah's longtime community involvement goes back to his school days as a member of the Fellowship of Christian Athletes, Big Brothers, and Special Olympics Volunteer. His community involvement led to the creation of I.N.S.P.I.R.E. RR, Inc., a Rewards and Recognition Program for reading.

Micah is the father of Marie and Myles Blunt.
