= Manny Paner =

Filipino basketball player

Personal information
- Born: May 17, 1949 (age 77) Cebu City
- Listed height: 6 ft 2 in (1.88 m)
- Listed weight: 195 lb (88 kg)

Career information
- College: UV
- Playing career: 1975–1986
- Position: Power forward / center
- Number: 5, 13

Career history
- 1975–1977: Royal Tru-Orange
- 1978–1980: Great Taste Discoverers
- 1981: CDCP Road Builders
- 1982–1986: San Miguel/Gold Eagle/Magnolia

Career highlights
- 1x PBA Champion (1982 PBA Invitational); Mythical Five; PBA Hall of Fame (2007); 50 Greatest Players in PBA History (2000 selection); Played in the 1972 Munich Olympics; Played in the 1974 FIBA World Championships; 5,000 Points; 1,000 Offensive Rebounds; Top 25: Rebounding Average; Season Champion: Total Defensive Rebounds; 3x Season Champion: Total Offensive Rebounds; Season Champion: Total Rebounds
Medals
Men's basketball
Representing Philippines
ABC Championship
Silver medal – second place	1971 Tokyo	Team
Gold medal – first place	1973 Manila	Team

Manuel Paner (born May 17, 1949), better known as Manny Paner, is a Filipino retired professional basketball player.

== Player profile ==
Paner was born in Cebu City, Philippines. During his prime, he was known for his strong rebounding, defense and deadly hook shot. At a mere 6'2", he would play center and sometimes defend the opposing team's American imports.

During the late 1960s and early 1970s, Paner played for the San Miguel Braves in the MICAA, along with other Cebuano cagers Rosalio Martirez and Alejandrito Miego, to a name of few.

During the PBA's inaugural season in 1975, he was the center in the league's first Mythical Team, and in 1978, he left Royal Tru-Orange to sign with Great Taste what was then the league's biggest contract that paid him a whopping Php8,000 a month. He later played briefly for CDCP Road Builders, and in 1982, he was signed back to San Miguel where he ended his career in 1986.

In 2000, he was named a member of the PBA's 25 Greatest Players, and was inducted into the PBA Hall of Fame in 2007.

== International career ==
In 1972, Paner appeared at the Olympic Games in Munich, Germany as a member of the country's national basketball team.

== Personal life ==
Paner is married to former actress Daisy Romualdez. The couple have two adopted daughters, Kristina and Danita. And Son Karl Paner
