= 1982 YCO-Tanduay season =

1982 Yco-Tanduay season
- Head coach: Freddie Webb
- Owner(s): Elizalde & Co.

Reinforced All-Filipino Conference results
- Record: 9–11 (45%)
- Place: 6th
- Playoff finish: Quarterfinals

Invitational Conference results
- Record: 0–0
- Place: N/A
- Playoff finish: N/A

Open Conference results
- Record: 12–9 (57.1%)
- Place: 5th
- Playoff finish: Quarterfinals

Yco-Tanduay seasons

The 1982 Yco-Tanduay season was the 8th season of the franchise in the Philippine Basketball Association (PBA).

== Transactions ==
Rookies	Signed	Last MICAA team
Zaldy Latoza	Off-season	APCOR
Frankie Lim ^{played for the National team}	Off-season	N/A
Melvin Martin	Off-season	Jag Jeans
Jose Yango ^{played for the National team}	Off-season	N/A

== Summary ==
Last year's Reinforced Filipino Conference best import Russell Murray returns to the Esquires in the first conference of the season. Yco-Tanduay finishes at fifth in the team standings. They were swept in two games by Toyota Super Corollas in the best-of-three quarterfinals.

In the Open Conference, the Esquires' two imports were 6-11 Jerome Henderson and 6-8 Curtis Berry. Yco-Tanduay were third behind N-Rich Coffee and Gilbey's Gin after 18 games in the elimination phase. Going into the last playing date of the quarterfinal round on November 23, all four quarterfinalist are tied with one win and one loss each. The Esquires lost to Toyota Super Corollas and were eliminated from the four-team semifinals.

== Won-loss records vs Opponents ==
Teams	Win	Loss	1st (Reinforced)	3rd (Open)
Crispa Redmanizers	1	3	0-2	1-1
Mariwasa-Honda / Galerie Dominique	4	1	2-1	2-0
Gilbey's Gin	3	2	1-1	2-1
Great Taste / N-Rich Coffee	3	3	3-0	0-3
San Miguel Beermen	2	4	1-2	1-2
Toyota Super Corollas	4	5	1-4	3-1
U-Tex Wranglers	4	2	1-1	3-1
Total	21	20	9-11	12-9

== Roster ==
Yco-Tanduay roster
Players
Coaches

Pos.	No.	Nat.	Name	Ht.	Wt.
G	4 & 6	(Philippines)	Miguel Bilbao	5 ft 9 in (1.75 m)		De La Salle
G	5	(Philippines)	Melvin Martin	6 ft 0 in (1.83 m)		Adamson
G	7	(Philippines)	Roberto Dela Rosa	5 ft 11 in (1.80 m)		Far Eastern
G	8 & 44	(Philippines)	Alexander Marquez	5 ft 9 in (1.75 m)		De La Salle
F	10	(Philippines)	Zaldy Latoza	6 ft 2 in (1.88 m)		TUA
G/F	11	(Philippines)	Jaime Manansala	5 ft 11 in (1.80 m)		UE
F	12	(Philippines)	Reynaldo Lazaro	6 ft 1 in (1.85 m)		Far Eastern
F	13	(Philippines)	Alberto Gutierrez	6 ft 2 in (1.88 m)		Ateneo de Davao
G	14 & 4	(Philippines)	Frankie Lim	5 ft 11 in (1.80 m)		San Beda
C	15	(Philippines)	Ely Capacio	6 ft 4 in (1.93 m)
G	17	(Philippines)	Raymundo Barreiro	5 ft 11 in (1.80 m)		San Beda
F/C	24	(Philippines)	Jose Yango	6 ft 3 in (1.91 m)		San Beda
F	42	(Philippines)	Abelardo Monzon	6 ft 1 in (1.85 m)		Letran
F	50 & 32	(Philippines)	Victor Sanchez	6 ft 3 in (1.91 m)		Mapúa
G/F	33	(United States)	Russell Murray (I)	6 ft 3 in (1.91 m)		Montana State Billings
C	00	(United States)	Jerome Henderson (I)	6 ft 11 in (2.11 m)		New Mexico
F	31	(United States)	Curtis Berry (I)	6 ft 7 in (2.01 m)		Missouri

Head coach

- (Philippines) Freddie Webb

Assistant coach(es)

Legend

- (C) Team captain
- (I) Import
- Injured
