= 1982 Toyota Super Corollas season =

- Head coach: Edgardo Ocampo
- Owner: Delta Motor Corporation

Reinforced All-Filipino Conference results
- Record: 19–13 (59.4%)
- Place: 1st
- Playoff finish: Champions

Invitational Conference results
- Record: 2–4 (33.3%)
- Place: 4th
- Playoff finish: N/A

Open Conference results
- Record: 17–14 (54.8%)
- Place: 1st
- Playoff finish: Champions

Toyota Super Corollas seasons

The 1982 Toyota Super Corollas season was the eighth season of the franchise in the Philippine Basketball Association (PBA).

== Colors ==
(dark)
(light)

== Transactions ==
Four rookies from the defunct MICAA basketball league were signed up, they are Tim Coloso, formerly of Solidenims and Jag Jeans, Edgardo Cordero, who played for Crispa and was part of the 1981 Philippine training team and a member of the national team to the ABC championships and SEA games, Ricardo Relosa from Toyota's farm team MAN Diesel and like Cordero, he was part of the training team and a national team member who saw action in the ABC and 11th Southeast Asian Games held in Manila, and Antero Saldana, a national youth player from multi-titled APCOR Financiers.

== Awards ==
- Center Ramon Fernandez was voted Most Valuable Player (MVP) of the season, winning his first MVP trophy after narrowly losing the same award to Atoy Co in 1979.
- Donnie Ray Koonce was named Best Import of the Open Conference.

== Summary ==
The Toyota Super Corollas started their season campaign with a 111-110 victory over rival and defending champions Crispa Redmanizers on opening night of the league's 8th season on March 7. After six games, import Arnold Dugger was sent home in favor of Donnie Ray Koonce, who debut in Toyota's 102-99 win over Gilbey's Gin on April 13. The Super Corollas finish with a 10-8 win–loss record after 18 games in the elimination phase. Toyota scored a two-game sweep over Yco-Tanduay in the best-of-three quarterfinals and will play old rival Crispa this time in a best-of-five semifinal series. The Super Corollas defeated the Redmanizers, three games to two, outscoring the Redmanizers by 13 points in the final period of the deciding fifth game to win by seven points, 111-104.

Toyota battled the San Miguel Beermen in the first-ever best-of-seven title playoffs. The Super Corollas lost the first two games but came back with victories in Games three and four to even the series at two games apiece, after losing Game five and trailed two games to three, the Super Corollas bounce back to win Game six and force a deciding seventh and final game. Toyota won the Reinforced Filipino crown with a 101-95 victory over San Miguel Beermen in Game seven.

In the Asian Invitationals, Toyota lost its bid for a grandslam when they bowed to Crispa in their do-or-die last game in the round-robin eliminations. The Super Corollas were swept in two games by the visiting Korean squad in the battle-for-third place wherein Toyota rookie Terry Saldaña figured in a brawl with South Korean guard Lee Minhyun in Game Two.

Last year's Open Conference Best Import Andrew Fields teamed up with Donnie Ray Koonce, who earlier helped the team win the Reinforced Filipino Crown. The Super Corollas were only tied at fifth with U/Tex with eight wins and ten losses in the Open Conference elimination phase, they made it to the semifinals by beating Yco-Tanduay in the knockout double-header on the last playdate of the quarterfinal round. Facing elimination again going into their last semifinal assignment against N-Rich Coffee, the Super Corollas prevailed to set up a playoff match with the Coffee Creamers for the right to meet first-time finalist Gilbey's Gin for the championship. Toyota repeated over N-Rich to advance into the title playoffs for the second time in the season.

Toyota had an easier time winning their second crown of the season and 9th overall title, scoring a 3-0 sweep over Gilbey's Gin, powered by high-scoring imports Lew Massey and Larry McNeill.

== Won–loss records vs opponents ==
Team	Win	Loss	1st (Reinforced)	2nd (Invitational)	3rd (Open)
Crispa Redmanizers	7	5	5-3	0-1	2-1
Mariwasa-Honda / Galerie Dominique	4	1	1-1	N/A	3-0
Gilbey's Gin	5	5	1-2	N/A	4-3
Great Taste / N-Rich Coffee	4	3	1-1	N/A	3-2
San Miguel Beermen	8	8	5-4	0-1	3-3
U-Tex Wranglers	4	3	2-1	1-0	1-2
YCO-Tanduay	5	4	4-1	N/A	1-3
Korea (Guest squad)	1	2	N/A	1-2	N/A
Total	38	31	19-13	2-4	17-14

== Roster ==
Toyota Super Corollas roster
Players
Coaches

Pos.	No.	Nat.	Name	Ht.	Wt.
F/C	6	(Philippines)	Abe King	6 ft 3 in (1.91 m)		San Beda
G	7	(Philippines)	Robert Jaworski	6 ft 0 in (1.83 m)		UE
G	8	(Philippines)	Francis Arnaiz	5 ft 10 in (1.78 m)		Ateneo
G	9	(Philippines)	Eduardo Merced	6 ft 0 in (1.83 m)		José Rizal
F/C	10	(Philippines)	Ramon Fernandez	6 ft 4 in (1.93 m)		San Carlos
G/F	11	(Philippines)	Arnie Tuadles	6 ft 2 in (1.88 m)		Visayas
G/F	13	(Philippines)	Timoteo Coloso	6 ft 2 in (1.88 m)		Letran
F	15	(Philippines)	Ricky Relosa	6 ft 4 in (1.93 m)		Mapúa
F/C	17	(Philippines)	Antero Saldaña	6 ft 3 in (1.91 m)		Letran
F	18	(Philippines)	Emerito Legaspi	5 ft 11 in (1.80 m)		UE
F	20	(Philippines)	Nicanor Bulaong	6 ft 3 in (1.91 m)		Far Eastern
G/F	22	(Philippines)	Danny Florencio	5 ft 10 in (1.78 m)		UST
F	41	(Philippines)	Leopoldo Herrera	6 ft 2 in (1.88 m)		Wesleyan Philippines
F/C	88	(Philippines)	Edgardo Cordero	6 ft 4 in (1.93 m)		UST
G/F	30	(United States)	Arnold Dugger (I)	6 ft 3 in (1.91 m)		Oral Roberts
G/F	30	(United States)	Donnie Ray Koonce (I)	6 ft 3 in (1.91 m)		North Carolina
C	1	(United States)	Andrew Fields (I)	6 ft 8 in (2.03 m)		Cheyney

Head coach

- (Philippines) Edgardo Ocampo

Assistant coach(es)

- (Philippines) Rino Salazar

Legend

- (C) Team captain
- (I) Import
- Injured
