= Lewis Brown (basketball) =

American basketball player (1955–2011)

Personal information
- Born: February 19, 1955 Los Angeles, California
- Died: September 14, 2011 (aged 56) Los Angeles, California
- Listed height: 6 ft 11 in (2.11 m)
- Listed weight: 225 lb (102 kg)

Career information
- High school: Verbum Dei (Los Angeles, California)
- College: UNLV (1973–1977)
- NBA draft: 1977: 4th round, 69th overall pick
- Drafted by: Milwaukee Bucks
- Playing career: 1977–1987
- Position: Center
- Number: 4

Career history
- 1977–1978: West Virginia Wheels
- 1978–1979: Jersey Shore Bullets
- 1979–1980: BOB Oud-Beijerland
- 1980: Great Taste Discoverers
- 1981: Washington Bullets
- 1982: Crispa Redmanizers
- 1985: Manila Beer Brewmasters
- 1985–1986: Basket Groot Willebroek
- 1986–1987: Le Mans
- 1987: Segafredo Gorizia

Career highlights
- Second-team Parade All-American (1973)
- Stats at NBA.com
- Stats at Basketball Reference

Lewis Brown (February 19, 1955 – September 14, 2011) was an American basketball player.

Brown played collegiately for the University of Nevada, Las Vegas. He was selected by the Milwaukee Bucks in the 4th round (69th pick overall) of the 1977 NBA draft and played two games in 1980–81 for the Washington Bullets in the NBA.

== Career statistics ==
Legend
GP	Games played	GS	Games started	MPG	Minutes per game
FG%	Field goal percentage	3P%	3-point field goal percentage	FT%	Free throw percentage
RPG	Rebounds per game	APG	Assists per game	SPG	Steals per game
BPG	Blocks per game	PPG	Points per game	**Bold**	Career high

=== NBA ===
==== Regular season ====
Year	Team	GP	MPG	FG%	3P%	FT%	RPG	APG	SPG	BPG	PPG
1980–81	Washington	2	2.5	.000	–	.400	1.0	.0	.0	.0	1.0
