= Glenn Hagan =

American basketball player (born 1955)

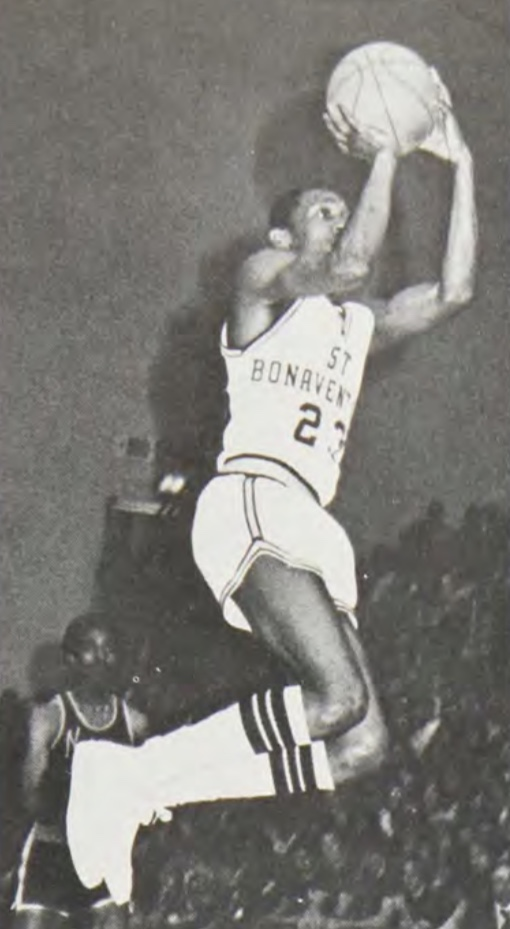
- Hagan as a junior at St. Bonaventure

Personal information
- Born: June 25, 1955 (age 71) Sanford, Florida, U.S.
- Listed height: 6 ft 0 in (1.83 m)
- Listed weight: 170 lb (77 kg)

Career information
- High school: Cardinal Mooney (Rochester, New York)
- College: St. Bonaventure (1974–1978)
- NBA draft: 1978: 2nd round, 43rd overall pick
- Drafted by: Philadelphia 76ers
- Position: Point guard
- Number: 10

Career history
- 1978–1982: Rochester Zeniths
- 1981: Detroit Pistons
- 1982: Crispa Redmanizers
- 1983: Montana Golden Nuggets
- 1984: Bay State Bombardiers

Career highlights
- 2× CBA champion (1979, 1981); 2× All-CBA First Team (1980, 1981); 2× CBA steals leader (1980, 1981)
- Stats at NBA.com
- Stats at Basketball Reference

Glenn Kassabin Hagan (born June 25, 1955) is an American former basketball player. He attended Cardinal Mooney High School in Rochester, New York, and St. Bonaventure University. After graduating from St. Bonaventure in 1978, he was an all-star guard for the Rochester Zeniths of the Continental Basketball Association in the early 1980s. He won CBA championships with the Zeniths in 1979 and 1981. He was a two-time All-CBA First Team selection in 1980 and 1981.

He played briefly in the NBA with the Detroit Pistons, and in 1982, as an "import" in the Philippine Basketball Association, where he led the Crispa Redmanizers to a runner-up finish to the San Miguel Beermen in the Asian Invitationals. He now uses his prior experience playing professionally to teach basketball to children, especially in the Rochester area.

== Career statistics ==
Legend
GP	Games played	GS	Games started	MPG	Minutes per game
FG%	Field goal percentage	3P%	3-point field goal percentage	FT%	Free throw percentage
RPG	Rebounds per game	APG	Assists per game	SPG	Steals per game
BPG	Blocks per game	PPG	Points per game	**Bold**	Career high

=== NBA ===
==== Regular season ====
Year	Team	GP	GS	MPG	FG%	3P%	FT%	RPG	APG	SPG	BPG	PPG
1981–82	Detroit	4	0	6.3	.429	–	1.000	1.0	2.0	.8	.0	1.8
