= Norman Black =

American basketball player

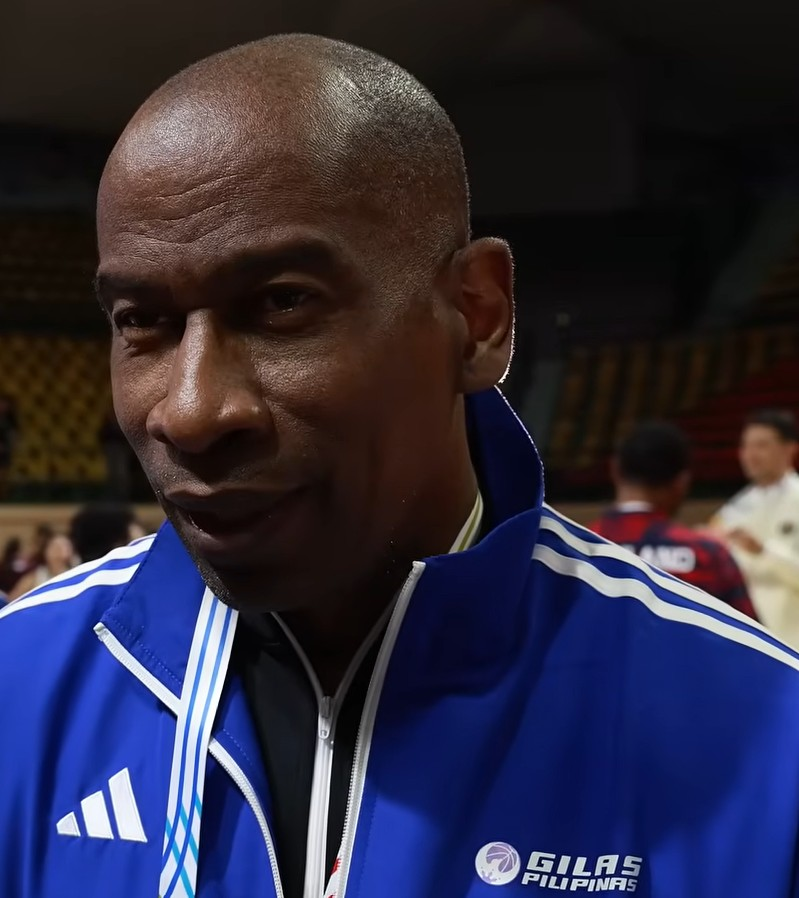
- Black in 2025

San Beda Red Lions
- Title: Team consultant
- League: NCAA Philippines

Personal information
- Born: November 12, 1957 (age 69) Baltimore, Maryland, U.S.
- Listed height: 6 ft 5 in (1.96 m)
- Listed weight: 186 lb (84 kg)

Career information
- High school: Cardinal Gibbons (Baltimore, Maryland)
- College: Saint Joseph's (1975–1979)
- NBA draft: 1979: undrafted
- Playing career: 1979–1997
- Position: Shooting guard / small forward
- Number: 50

Career history

Playing
- 1979–1982: Lancaster Red Roses / Philadelphia Kings
- 1980: Detroit Pistons
- 1981: Tefilin
- 1982, 1985: Magnolia Quench Plus
- 1986: Alaska Milkmen
- 1987–1988, 1990: San Miguel Beermen
- 1998: Pop Cola 800s

Coaching
- 1985: Magnolia Ice Cream Makers / Magnolia Quench Plus
- 1987–1996: San Miguel Beermen
- 1997: Mobiline Phone Pals
- 1997–1999: Pop Cola 800s
- 2000–2002: Sta. Lucia Realtors
- 2004: Ateneo (consultant)
- 2005–2012: Ateneo
- 2010–2012: Talk N' Text Tropang Texters (assistant)
- 2012–2014: Talk N' Text Tropang Texters
- 2011–2018: Philippines (assistant)
- 2014–2023: Meralco Bolts
- 2023–present: San Beda (consultant)
- 2023–present: Meralco Bolts (consultant)

Career highlights
- As player: 2× PBA champion (1982 Invitational, 1988 Reinforced); 2× PBA Best Import (1982 Reinforced Filipino, 1985 Open); PBA 10,000 point club; As head coach: 11× PBA champion coach (1987 Reinforced, 1988 Open, 1988 Reinforced, 1989 Open, All-Filipino, 1989 Reinforced, 1992 All-Filipino, 1993 Governors', 1994 All-Filipino, 2001 Governors', 2013 Philippine); Grand Slam champion (1989); 5× PBA All-Star Game Head Coach (1993, 1995–1997, 2018); 5× UAAP champion (2008–2012); Filoil Flying V Cup champion (2011); 3× PCCL champion (2007, 2009, 2010); As assistant coach: 3× PBA champion (2010–11 Philippine, 2011 Commissioner's, 2011–12 Philippine); As consultant: PBA champion (2024 Philippine); PBA Baby Dalupan Coach of the Year (2024); NCAA champion (2023, 2025)
- Stats at NBA.com
- Stats at Basketball Reference
Medals
Men's basketball
Head coach for Philippines
SEA Games
Gold medal – first place	2011 Jakarta	Team
Gold medal – first place	2025 Bangkok	Team
Assistant coach for Philippines
FIBA Asia Championship
Silver medal – second place	2013 Manila	Team
Silver medal – second place	2015 Changsha	Team
Asian Games
Silver medal – second place	1990 Beijing	Team

Norman Augustus Black (born November 12, 1957) is an American-Philippine professional basketball coach and former player. He serves as a team consultant for the Meralco Bolts of the Philippine Basketball Association (PBA) and the San Beda Red Lions of the NCAA Philippines.

He played in the CBA and the NBA before moving to the PBA, where his exceptional performance and work ethic earned him the moniker "Mr. 100%". Black eventually settled in the Philippines and transitioned into a highly successful coaching career. He is the former head coach of the Meralco Bolts, San Miguel Beermen, Mobiline Phone Pals, Pop Cola 800s, Sta. Lucia Realtors, and Talk 'N Text Tropang Texters in the PBA, as well as the Ateneo Blue Eagles in the UAAP.

== Career ==
=== High school, college, NBA, and CBA career ===
Black played high school basketball for the Cardinal Gibbons School in Baltimore, graduating in 1975. He played college basketball for Saint Joseph's University in Pennsylvania from 1975 to 1979, where he averaged 17 points per game over his collegiate career.

He was selected by the Lancaster Red Roses in the 1979 Continental Basketball Association (CBA) draft and played in the league until 1982, also spending time with the Philadelphia Kings. During this period, he briefly made it to the National Basketball Association (NBA), signing with the Detroit Pistons. He appeared in three games during the 1980–81 NBA season, averaging 2.7 points per game.

=== PBA career ===
Following his brief regular season appearance in Detroit, Black spent the summer of 1981 playing for the Pistons' entry in the Southern California Summer Pro League in Los Angeles. It was there that international opportunities arose. Jimmy Mariano, then the head coach of the Great Taste Coffee Makers, scouted Black at the summer league and invited him to play in the Philippines. Attracted by the guarantee of a contracted salary—which surpassed the non-guaranteed training camp invite the Pistons were offering for the upcoming season—Black decided to accept. Although the Great Taste roster spot was briefly filled by Lew Massey before Black could return the call, Tefilin Polyesters general manager Frank Harn quickly offered him an identical contract, which Black accepted.

Black made his Philippine Basketball Association (PBA) debut with Tefilin in 1981, averaging 51 points per game across 14 appearances. In 1982, he joined the San Miguel Beermen, playing 66 games and averaging nearly 43 points per contest. Alongside local mainstays Yoyong Martirez and Manny Paner, and under the guidance of head coach Tommy Manotoc, Black helped lead San Miguel to the 1982 PBA Invitational Championship over a visiting South Korean national squad. He moved to Great Taste Coffee in 1983, where he averaged 38 points over 49 games. Highly regarded for his basketball intelligence and legendary work ethic—such as playing through a fractured finger—he became the inaugural recipient of the PBA "Mr. 100%" Award that season. The specialty performance award was granted only one other time in league history, when Alaska's Sean Chambers received it in 1991. During this era, veteran sportscaster Pinggoy Pengson affectionately nicknamed him "That Old Black Magic."

In 1985, Black returned to the league to play for Magnolia Quench Plus, recording a career-high 76 points in a single game and averaging 43.5 points over the season. When the Magnolia franchise temporarily deactivated, its players were absorbed by the expansion team Alaska Air Force, where Black briefly played. He later returned to San Miguel as a playing coach during import-laden conferences, while operating as a full-time head coach during All-Filipino tournaments. In 1989, he successfully guided the Beermen to a coveted PBA Grand Slam, becoming only the third franchise in league history to achieve the feat. Black played his final full season on the hardwood in 1990 before fully retiring from active play to focus entirely on his head coaching duties in 1991.

== Coaching career ==
=== San Miguel Beermen ===
In 1985, businessman and sports patron Danding Cojuangco invited Black to transition into coaching. Black later recalled that he initially had no desire to coach, but Cojuangco believed he was suited for the role after hearing his tactical insights while Black was working as a PBA television analyst.

Black served as a playing coach for the franchise between 1985 and 1986. By 1987, he retired from full-time active play to become the head coach of the San Miguel Beermen, a position he held until 1996. During his ten-year coaching tenure, he guided the franchise to nine PBA championships, highlighted by a coveted Grand Slam in 1989. Over this period, Black coached a roster that included Samboy Lim, Allan Caidic, Hector Calma, Ramon Fernandez, Ricardo Brown, and Ato Agustin, alongside key mainstays such as Alvin Teng, Franz Pumaren, Pido Jarencio, Kevin Ramas, and Bong Ravena.

In 1994, after leading San Miguel to the PBA All-Filipino Cup title, Black was appointed head coach of the Philippine national basketball team for the 1994 Asian Games in Hiroshima, Japan. The national squad ultimately finished in fourth place, missing out on a podium medal. In 1996, during his final year with the San Miguel franchise, Black briefly stepped out of retirement to play a single game as a temporary substitute import for the injury-plagued Beermen, scoring 15 points.

=== Mobiline, Pop Cola, and Sta. Lucia ===
Following a ten-year stint with San Miguel, Black was appointed head coach of the Mobiline Cellulars at the start of the 1997 season, steering the team to a semifinal appearance in the All-Filipino Cup. In August 1997, following the Commissioner's Cup, a rare head coach trade saw Black transfer to the Pop Cola Bottlers in exchange for Derrick Pumaren. Under his leadership, the rebranded Pop Cola 800s achieved two consecutive third-place finishes during the 1998 season featuring a roster that included Vergel Meneses, Bonel Balingit, and Kenneth Duremdes.

During the 1998 Commissioner's Cup, after import Marcus Timmons departed, the 41-year-old Black activated himself as a temporary replacement for the third-place playoff against the Formula Shell. He became the oldest import to play in league history, recording 10 points, 16 rebounds, and 5 assists to secure an 84–80 victory. Following a difficult 1999 season where Pop Cola finished with a winless 0–8 record in the Governors' Cup, Black left the franchise.

In 2000, Black was hired as the head coach of the Sta. Lucia Realtors. He immediately led the team to its second-ever finals appearance, losing to San Miguel in five games during the Commissioner's Cup. The following year, he steered the Realtors to their first-ever PBA championship, defeating the Beermen 4–2 in the best-of-seven series of the season-ending 2001 Governors' Cup, sealed by a buzzer-beating three-pointer from Chris Tan in Game 6. Following the 2002 season, Black resigned from his post and his longtime assistant coach, Alfrancis Chua, was elevated to head coach.

=== TV commentary and endorsements ===
During his coaching career, Black frequently served as a guest analyst for television broadcasts of Philippine Basketball Association (PBA) games. Following his departure from the Sta. Lucia Realtors in 2003, he was hired by the National Broadcasting Network (NBN) as a regular color commentator for its PBA coverage. He was frequently paired with play-by-play announcer Mico Halili, drawing positive reception for integrating Filipino phrases into his English-language technical analysis.

When the broadcast rights shifted to the Associated Broadcasting Company (ABC) in 2004, Black was retained as part of the new broadcast team, working alongside Halili, Ed Picson, and Paolo Trillo. During the 2005–06 and 2006–07 PBA seasons, he hosted "Black's Board," a weekly Sunday halftime segment dedicated to analyzing league highlights and broader developments in Philippine basketball.

Additionally, Black hosted "Burlington Basketball 101," an instructional segment detailing basketball fundamentals that aired during ABC's pre-game show, PBA Gamebol. This segment was tied to his commercial endorsement contract with Burlington Socks.

=== Ateneo Blue Eagles head coach ===
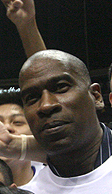
Black coaching the Blue Eagles in 2010

In 2004, Black joined the Ateneo Blue Eagles as a team consultant. Following a third-place finish in the 2004 season under Sandy Arespacochaga, school officials appointed Black as the new head coach ahead of the 2005 campaign, making him the 35th head coach in the program's history.

He led the Blue Eagles to a 10–4 record in his debut season, but they were eliminated in the semifinals by the De La Salle Green Archers, who held a twice-to-beat advantage. In 2006, Black guided Ateneo to a 10–2 elimination round record to secure the top seed. After defeating the Adamson Falcons in the Final Four, the Blue Eagles faced the UST Growling Tigers in the Finals. Ateneo won Game 1 following a full-court inbound pass from Macky Escalona to Doug Kramer for a buzzer-beating layup. However, the Growling Tigers rallied to win the next two games, defeating Ateneo in overtime in Game 3 to claim the championship.

In 2007, Black coached a transitioning Ateneo roster to a 9–5 standing. After losing a seeding playoff to La Salle, they entered the Final Four as the No. 3 seed. The Blue Eagles eliminated the defending champion UST Growling Tigers in the first round and forced a do-or-die game against La Salle in the semifinals before ultimately being eliminated. Later that year, he led the team to the 2007 Collegiate Champions League (CCL) national title by defeating the University of the Visayas Green Lancers.

In 2008, Black steered the Blue Eagles to a dominant 13–1 elimination round record. They captured the UAAP championship by sweeping La Salle in the Finals, winning 69–61 in Game 1 and 62–51 in Game 2. This marked Ateneo's first UAAP title since 2002. Months later, he coached the team to a Philippine University Games championship over the EAC Generals.

Black guided the Blue Eagles to three distinct titles in 2009. In UAAP Season 72, Ateneo secured back-to-back championships by defeating the UE Red Warriors after finishing the elimination round with another 13–1 record. The team followed this with a consecutive title in the University Games against St. Francis of Assisi College and capped off the year by winning the 2009 Philippine Collegiate Championship over the FEU Tamaraws.

In 2010, Black completed his first championship three-pack at Ateneo during UAAP Season 73. The Blue Eagles finished the elimination round at 10–4, defeated the Adamson Falcons in the semifinals, and swept the FEU Tamaraws in the structural Finals (72–49 and 65–62). Later that year, they secured their third national collegiate championship under Black by defeating Adamson in the 2010 Philippine Collegiate Championship final.

Black secured a four-peat in 2011, making Ateneo only the third university to win four consecutive titles since the implementation of the Final Four format in 1994. After a 13–1 elimination phase, the Blue Eagles bested UST in the Final Four (69–66) before sweeping FEU in a grand finals rematch, winning 82–64 in Game 1 and 82–69 in Game 2.

In early 2012, Black announced that the 2012 season would be his final year with Ateneo, as he had agreed to return to the professional ranks to succeed Chot Reyes as head coach of the Talk 'N Text Tropang Texters. He concluded his collegiate tenure by steering the Blue Eagles to a fifth consecutive championship, sweeping the UST Growling Tigers in the collection series (83–78 and 65–62). With this milestone, Black became only the second head coach in UAAP history to capture five consecutive titles, trailing Baby Dalupan, who won seven straight with the UE Red Warriors. Following the season, he transitioned into a consulting role with the university for the subsequent two years.

=== Return to the PBA ===
==== Talk 'N Text Tropang Texters (2012–2014) ====
After winning five consecutive titles for Ateneo, Black returned to the professional ranks as head coach of the Talk 'N Text Tropang Texters. During his stint with the Texters, he achieved his 500th career victory, becoming the latest member of the league's 500-win coaching club. He also guided the franchise to its third consecutive All-Filipino crown during the 2012–13 PBA season.

==== Meralco Bolts (2014–2023) ====
In 2014, the franchises under the MVP group corporate umbrella reshuffled their coaching staffs. Black was reassigned to the Meralco Bolts, while Jong Uichico replaced him as the head coach of Talk 'N Text. In his inaugural conference during the 2014–15 PBA Philippine Cup, Meralco secured a top-six seed in the elimination round with a 6–5 record. Entering the quarterfinals as the sixth seed with a twice-to-beat disadvantage against the Purefoods Star Hotshots, the Bolts eliminated the defending champions. A few days later, the Bolts were eliminated by the Alaska Aces in the knockout phase.

During the 2016 Governors' Cup, Black steered Meralco to its first-ever Governor's Cup Finals appearance, setting up a championship series against Barangay Ginebra San Miguel, coached by Tim Cone; the Bolts ultimately lost the series in six games. In the subsequent 2017 PBA Governors' Cup, he guided the Bolts to a franchise-best 9–2 elimination record to claim the top seed and a twice-to-beat advantage. Meralco defeated the Blackwater Elite in the quarterfinals and swept the Star Hotshots in three games during the semifinals to book a finals rematch against Barangay Ginebra. The Bolts lost the consecutive championship series in seven games.

== Professional playing career statistics ==
Legend
GP	Games played	MPG	Minutes per game	FG%	Field goal percentage
3P%	3-point field goal percentage	FT%	Free throw percentage	RPG	Rebounds per game
APG	Assists per game	SPG	Steals per game	BPG	Blocks per game
PPG	Points per game	**Bold**	Career high		Led the league

Year	Team	League	GP	MPG	FG%	3P%	FT%	RPG	APG	SPG	BPG	PPG
1979–80	Lancaster Red Roses	CBA	17	27.7	.568	.000	.734	9.9	1.7	.9	.5	22.5
1980	Detroit Pistons	NBA	3	9.3	.300	.000	.286	.7	.7	.3	.0	2.7
1980–81	Philadelphia Kings	CBA	34	41.1	.512	.000	.723	8.4	2.4	**1.4**	.6	26.1
1981	Telfilin Polyesters	PBA	14	46.0	**.577**	.000	.709	**24.6**	3.1	.3	2.2	**51.8**
1981–82	Lancaster Lightning	CBA	29	36.8	.483	.000	.606	7.8	1.9	1.2	.6	20.4
1982	San Miguel Beer	PBA	66	46.1	.539	**.500**	.657	19.4	3.4	.2	1.7	42.7
1983	Great Taste Coffee	PBA	49	45.7	.573	.000	.689	18.6	**6.5**	.4	1.0	38.1
1985	Magnolia	PBA	44	47.8	.531	.191	.719	17.6	4.2	.2	1.8	43.6
1986	Alaska Milk	PBA	14	43.9	**.582**	.000	.735	19.5	4.0	.3	1.5	41.2
1987	Magnolia Ice Cream	PBA	24	**47.9**	.557	.000	.620	20.7	4.4	.4	2.1	42.6
1988	San Miguel	PBA	48	47.7	.568	.200	.702	17.1	3.1	.2	2.6	35.7
1990	San Miguel	PBA	21	**47.9**	.548	.000	.683	20.0	3.8	.2	**2.9**	32.7
Career		All Leagues	363	44.2	.547	.178	.685	16.5	3.7	.5	1.6	36.3

== Coaching record ==
=== Collegiate record ===
Season	Eliminations						Playoffs				
Season	Team	Finish	GP	W	L	PCT	PG	W	L	PCT	Results
2005	ADMU	3rd	14	10	4	.714	2	1	1	.500	Semifinals
2006	ADMU	1st	14	10	2	.833	4	2	2	.500	Finals
2007	ADMU	3rd	14	9	5	.643	4	2	2	.500	Stepladder round 2
2008	ADMU	1st	14	13	1	.929	3	3	0	1.000	Champions
2009	ADMU	1st	14	13	1	.929	4	3	1	.750	Champions
2010	ADMU	2nd	14	10	4	.714	3	3	0	1.000	Champions
2011	ADMU	1st	14	13	1	.929	3	3	0	1.000	Champions
2012	ADMU	1st	14	12	2	.857	3	3	0	1.000	Champions
Totals			112	90	20	.818	26	20	6	.769	5 championships

== Personal life ==
Black grew up in Baltimore, Maryland, and permanently relocated to the Philippines after debuting as an overseas import in the Philippine Basketball Association (PBA) in 1981. He later became a naturalized Filipino citizen, making the country his permanent home.

Black is married to Benjie Davila-Black. They have two sons, including Aaron, who followed in his father's footsteps as a professional basketball player. During his tenure as head coach of the Meralco Bolts, Black coached Aaron, making them one of the notable father-son duos in PBA history; Aaron won the PBA Outstanding Rookie award during the 2020 PBA Philippine Cup under his father's guidance.
