= Lew Massey =

American basketball player

Personal information
- Born: February 16, 1956 Pineville, North Carolina, U.S.
- Died: January 23, 2014 (aged 57) Charlotte, North Carolina, U.S.
- Listed height: 6 ft 5 in (1.96 m)
- Listed weight: 215 lb (98 kg)

Career information
- High school: South Mecklenburg (Charlotte, North Carolina)
- College: Charlotte (1974–1978)
- NBA draft: 1978: 2nd round, 38th overall pick
- Drafted by: Los Angeles Lakers
- Position: Small forward / shooting guard
- Number: 23

Career history
- 1978–1979: Maine Lumberjacks
- 1979–1980: Lehigh Valley Jets
- 1981: Presto Fun Drinks
- 1982: Lancaster Lightning
- 1982–1983: Gilbey's Gin

Career highlights
- AP Honorable mention All-American (1976); 2× First-team All-Sun Belt (1977, 1978)
- Stats at Basketball Reference

Lawrence "Lew" Massey (February 16, 1956 – January 23, 2014) was an American professional basketball player. He played college basketball at the University of North Carolina at Charlotte.

== Early years ==
Massey attended South Mecklenburg. He accepted a basketball scholarship from the University of North Carolina at Charlotte. Often called "Sweet Lew", the prolific scorer helped the 49ers reach the 1976 National Invitation Tournament finals as a sophomore, losing 67–71 against the University of Kentucky. He also set school records for single-season scoring average (22.5) and total points (677). He set a school single-game record with 10 blocked shots against Wofford College.

As a junior in 1977, along with teammate Cedric Maxwell, he contributed to the team reaching the final four in the NCAA tournament. The 49–51 loss against Marquette University, was surrounded in controversy with a last-second tip-in by Jerome Whitehead.

As a senior, he averaged 21.8 points (third in school history) and 6.8 rebounds per game. He scored 38 points (fourth in school history) against Virginia Commonwealth University.

Massey graduated as the leading scorer in school history (2,149 points). He posted a 19.4 point average per game (third in school history), 740 total rebounds (fourth in school history), 343 total free throws made (third in school history), fifty five 20+ scoring games (school record) and 916 field goals made (school record).

== Professional career ==
Massey was selected by the Los Angeles Lakers in the second round (38th overall) of the 1978 NBA draft. He was cut a month away from the 1978-79 NBA regular season opener.

In 1978, he signed with the Maine Lumberjacks of the Continental Basketball Association, where he ranked seventh in the league with 970 scored points.

In 1979, he was signed by the San Diego Clippers of the National Basketball Association. He was released on October 17. That same year, he played in 26 games with the Lehigh Valley Jets, while scoring 406 points. He ended up leaving the United States for the Venezuelan and Swiss semi-pro circuits.

In 1981, he signed with the Presto Fun Drinks of the Philippine Basketball Association (PBA).

In 1982, he played in one game with the Lancaster Lightning of the Continental Basketball Association, registering 2 points, 7 rebounds and one assist. That same year, he signed up with Gilbey's Gin Gimlets of the PBA. He rewarded the team to a second-place finish in the third conference. His 47-game stint with Gilbey's was one of the memorable in league annals, averaging 46.6 points per game. On March 25, 1982, he established an All-time PBA mark for most points (85) in one game at that time, in Gilbey's 123-126 elimination round loss to the Crispa Redmanizers.

== Personal life ==
Massey was the nephew of former NBA player Walter Davis. Although he struggled with drug addiction after his retirement from professional basketball, he had been clean for 12 years. He suffered from diabetes and lost a leg to the disease. On January 23, 2014, he died of natural causes at the age of 57 years old.
