= Rich Adams =

American basketball player (born 1956)

Personal information
- Born: July 1, 1956 (age 70) Cincinnati, Ohio, U.S.
- Listed height: 6 ft 9 in (2.06 m)
- Listed weight: 205 lb (93 kg)

Career information
- High school: Colerain (Cincinnati, Ohio)
- College: Illinois (1974–1978)
- NBA draft: 1978: 4th round, 86th overall pick
- Drafted by: San Antonio Spurs
- Playing career: 2006–present
- Position: Center / power forward
- Number: 32, 40

Career history
- 1978-1979: Reno Bighorns
- 1979-1981: Emirates Sports Club
- 1982: N-Rich Coffee Creamers
- 1983: San Miguel Beermen
- 1985: Shell Azodrin Bugbusters
- Stats at Basketball Reference

Rich Adams (born July 1, 1956) is an American former basketball player. He played four years with the University of Illinois varsity in the NCAA, averaged 5.1 points as a freshman in coach Gene Bartow's only season with the fighting Illinois. The next year, Adams boosted his scoring clip to 15.9 as new coach Lou Henson steered the varsity to a 14–13 mark, a dramatic leap from the 8–19 record the previous year.

Adams was picked in the fourth round by the San Antonio Spurs in the 1978 NBA draft. He failed to make it in the majors and saw action instead for the Reno Bighorns in the Western Basketball Association in 1978–79. He had overseas stints in Dubai playing for the Emirates Sports Club and the Philippines.

His daughter is the Team USA Volleyball team middle Rachael Adams.
