= Tommy Manotoc =

Filipino basketball coach & golfer (born 1949)

Personal information
- Born: August 9, 1949 (age 77)

Career information
- College: De La Salle University
- Coaching career: 1977–1984; 1992; 1997–1998

Career history

Coaching
- 1977–1980: U/Tex Wranglers
- 1981–1982: San Miguel Beermen
- 1983–1984: Crispa Redmanizers
- 1992: Presto Ice Cream Kings
- 1997–1998: Mobiline Phone Pals

Career highlights
- As head coach: 6× PBA champion (1978 Open, 1980 Open, 1982 Invitational, 1983 All-Filipino, 1983 Reinforced Filipino, 1983 Open); Grand Slam champion (1983)

Tomás "Tommy" La'O Manotoc Sr. (born August 9, 1949), is a Filipino golfer and former basketball coach. As a basketball coach of several Philippine Basketball Association (PBA) teams, Manotoc won six PBA titles, including a grand slam with the fabled Crispa Redmanizers. Manotoc is the chairman emeritus of the Junior Golf Foundation of the Philippines (JGFP). He also served as president of the National Golf Association of the Philippines (NGAP) from 2012 to 2014. He occasionally writes as a sports columnist for the Philippine Daily Inquirer and was a TV panelist for the PBA coverage from 2000 to 2002.

== Early life and family ==
Manotoc is the son of Ricardo Manotoc and the former Nena Arguelles La'O. His father was a realtor, while his mother belonged to the prominent La'O family. Two of his uncles - Raúl Manglapus (who had married Pacita La'O, a sister of Manotoc's mother) and Eugenio López, Jr. (who had married Conchita La'O, another sister of Manotoc's mother) were prominent critics of Ferdinand Marcos.

== Professional career ==
=== PBA career ===
==== As head coach ====
Manotoc began his coaching career in 1977 with the U/Tex Wranglers in the Philippine Basketball Association (PBA). He was the Wranglers' team manager at the time when head coach Narciso Bernardo suddenly resigned after the 1977 All-Filipino Conference. Manotoc made his coaching debut during the 1977 Open Conference and immediately brought the Wranglers to a runner-up finish against Crispa, in the franchise's first finals appearance. Manotoc gave the Wranglers two PBA Open Conference championships, in 1978 and in 1980. He admitted that besting Toyota in 1980, felt like an achievement since they were down by four points with 16 seconds remaining in the fourth, but ultimately forced overtime and won.

Manotoc joined San Miguel Beer in 1981 and led the team to one PBA championship.

Manotoc joined the Crispa Redmanizers in 1983 and piloted the franchise pro bono to its second grand slam during the same season. On July 1, 1984, citing health reasons, Manotoc resigned as head coach after leading the Redmanizers to the 1984 PBA First All-Filipino Conference finals, winning over NCC, 96–94. He was to be succeeded by assistant coach Narciso Bernardo, who finished the task of capturing the title against the Gilbey's Gin Tonics.

After a long hiatus from coaching, Manotoc made a brief return to the PBA — in 1992 for the Presto Ice Cream Kings — and in 1997–1998 for the Mobiline Phone Pals.

A few decades later in June 2020, he revealed that during his championship stints as head coach of both U-Tex and Crispa, he did not charge the team, in terms of salary, and his bonuses that he had earned, were instead given to his father.

==== As PBA Deputy Commissioner ====
Manotoc briefly served as deputy commissioner of the PBA in 1985 under commissioner Mariano Yenko.

==== PBA Hall of Fame ====
Manotoc was inducted into the PBA Hall of Fame on October 2, 2011.

== Golf career ==
Manotoc and his sons Matthew Manotoc and Michael Ferdinand emerged victorious at the Baguio Country Club's Fil-Am Invitational Golf Cup at Camp John Hay.

=== DLSAA Sports Hall of Fame ===
In 2000, Manotoc was inducted into the De La Salle Alumni Association Sports Hall of Fame for golf.

== Personal life ==
Manotoc was first married to Miss International 1970 Aurora Pijuan. The couple had two children, namely Mavis and Tomas Jr. ("TJ"), a news presenter for ABS-CBN News and former sports play-by-play and color commentator on some PBA and UAAP coverages. After obtaining a divorce from Pijuan in the Dominican Republic, Manotoc married Imee Marcos, daughter of then-Philippine President Ferdinand Marcos, on December 4, 1981.

President Marcos and his wife Imelda were greatly displeased by the union; in particular since Manotoc was divorced, which ran counter to their Catholic Faith.

Manotoc was then allegedly kidnapped by "communist guerrillas" on December 29, 1981, after having dinner with Imee in Manila, and was held captive for several weeks, during which he was beaten. However, it was alleged by some that he had actually been taken on the orders of President Marcos, in an attempt to get him to end his relationship with his daughter. When released, Manotoc declared that the Marcos family had nothing to do with his kidnapping, but many were skeptical, and felt the statement was forced and scripted.

Despite this, the relationship continued for at least a decade.

Manotoc and Marcos have three children, Fernando Martín ("Borgy"), a model; Michael Ferdinand ("Mike"), a lawyer; and Matthew Joseph ("Matthew"), incumbent vice governor of Ilocos Norte.
