= Donnie Koonce =

American basketball player (born 1959)

Personal information
- Born: June 13, 1959 (age 67) North Carolina, U.S.
- Listed height: 6 ft 3 in (1.91 m)
- Listed weight: 190 lb (86 kg)

Career information
- High school: Jones Senior (Trenton, North Carolina)
- College: Charlotte (1977–1981)
- NBA draft: 1981: 4th round, 89th overall pick
- Drafted by: Detroit Pistons
- Position: Forward / shooting guard
- Number: 30

Career history
- 1981–1982: Atlantic City Hi-Rollers
- 1982: Toyota Super Corollas
- 1983: San Miguel Beermen
- 1986: Alaska Milkmen

Career highlights
- 2× PBA champion (1982 Reinforced, 1982 Open); PBA Best Import (1982 Open)
- Stats at Basketball Reference

Donnie Ray Koonce (born June 13, 1959) is a retired American basketball player. He was drafted in the fourth round of the 1981 NBA draft by the Detroit Pistons. Koonce was a member of the Pistons' runner-up entry in the 1981 Southern California Summer Pro league, appearing in all 13 contest. He played 3 seasons in the Philippine Basketball Association from 1982 to 1983 and 1986.

== PBA stint ==
Koonce played a total of 62 games for Toyota Super Corollas in all three conferences of the 1982 season, averaging 26.37 points per game. In the season-ending Open Conference, he won Best Import honors, edging his Toyota teammate and resident import Andrew Fields by one point in the balloting. With Toyota under the "handicap rule" the following season, Koonce signed with the San Miguel Beermen and raised his average to 36.78 points a game in 46 outings with the Beermen.

Koonce returned in 1986 to play for newcomer Alaska Milk. In the Reinforced (first) Conference that year, he teamed up with Jerry Lee Eaves to lead the newest PBA franchise to a strong fourth-place finish. However, in the second round eliminations of the same conference, Koonce suffered a serious knee injury after a nasty fall. In the Open (third) Conference, he would return to play alongside another Best Import awardee and PBA veteran Norman Black, but it became obvious that the injury took its toll on his game prompting management to replace him after five games with Mike Morrison. This was to be his final appearance in the PBA.

== Post-basketball career ==
After his PBA stint, Koonce earned his MBA from the University of Alabama at Birmingham and became a banking executive.
