= Mayor of Pasay =

City mayor in the Philippines

- Punong Lungsod ng Pasay
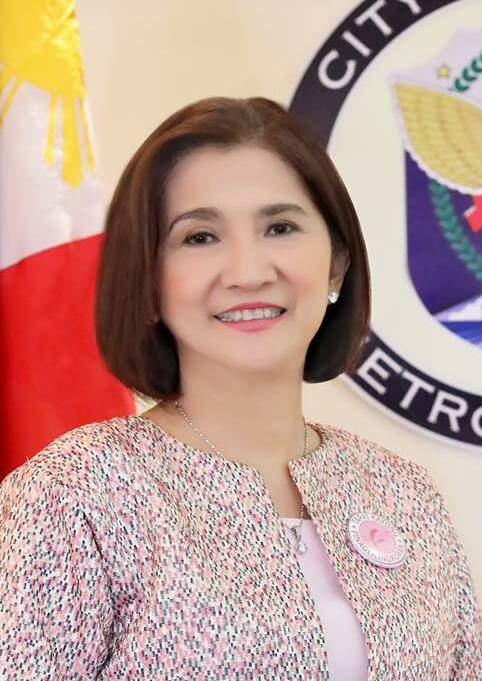
- Incumbent; Imelda Calixto-Rubiano since June 30, 2019
- Seat: Pasay City Hall
- Appointer: Elected via popular vote
- Term length: 3 years
- Inaugural holder: Pascual Villanueva
- Formation: 1900
- Deputy: Vice Mayor

The mayor of Pasay is the head of the executive branch of the Pasay City Government. The mayor holds office at the Pasay City Hall.

Like all local government heads in the Philippines, the mayor is elected via popular vote, and may not be elected for a fourth consecutive term (although the former mayor may return to office after an interval of one term) since the implementation of the 1987 Constitution of the Philippines. In case of death, resignation or incapacity, the vice mayor becomes the mayor.

The current mayor of Pasay is Imelda Calixto-Rubiano since June 30, 2019.

== History ==
The position was established as municipal president in 1900, when Pasay was then a pueblo named Pineda, which was then part of the Province of Manila. In 1901, the municipality was renamed Pasay and became part of the newly created province of Rizal. The position was later redesignated as mayor.

During World War II, President Manuel L. Quezon established the City of Greater Manila in 1942, which absorbed Pasay and its municipal mayor became a district chief reporting to the city's Chief of the Division of Districts and of the District and Neighborhood Association. Pasay Mayors Moises San Juan, Adolfo Santos, and Enrique Manaloto served as district chief from Pasay. The City of Greater Manila was abolished on August 1, 1945, restoring Pasay’s municipal status and the position of its mayor. From its cityhood in 1947 to 1950, Pasay was briefly known as Rizal City, with Rufino Mateo as the only mayor of the city under such name. Pablo Cuneta became the first elected city mayor of Pasay in 1955.

In 1975, Pasay was incorporated into the newly created Metro Manila.

== List of mayors of Pasay ==
#	Image	Mayor	Dates in Office	Notes
1		Pascual Villanueva	1900–1905	First municipal president of Pasay renamed from Pineda
2		Gregorio Villanueva	1906–1908	
3		Mauro Reyes	1908–1910	
4		Eugenio Villanueva	1910–1912	
*		Pascual Villanueva	1912–1919	
5		Miguel Cornejo	1919–1922; 1928–1931	
6		Moises San Juan	1931–1937	
7		Rufino Mateo	1937–1940	
*		Moises San Juan	1940–1942	District Chief for Pasay under the City of Greater Manila (1941–42)
*		Adolfo Santos	1942–1942	District Chief for Pasay under the City of Greater Manila
*		Enrique Manaloto	1942–1945	District Chief for Pasay under the City of Greater Manila (1942–1944)
*		Alipio Pestañas	1945–1945	
*		Nicanor Santos	1945–1945	
*		Adolfo Santos	1945–1945	
*		Rufino Mateo	1946–1950	The only mayor of Rizal City
8		Carlos Rivilla	1950–1951	
9		Primitivo Lovina	1951–1952	
10		Pablo Cuneta	1953–1955	First elected mayor (1955)
*		Jose Milan	1955–1955	Acting mayor
*		Pablo Cuneta	1955–1967	
*		Ansberto Paredes	1961–1961	Acting mayor
11		Jovito Claudio	1967–1971	
*		Pablo Cuneta	1972–1986	
*		Eduardo Calixto	1986–1987	Acting mayor
*		Norma Urbina	1987–1988	Acting mayor
*		Pablo Cuneta	1988–1998	
*		Jovito Claudio	1998–2000	
12		Wenceslao Trinidad	2000–2006	
*		Allan Panaligan	2006–2007	Acting mayor during Trinidad's suspension
*		Wenceslao Trinidad	2007–2010	
13		Antonino Calixto	2010–2019	
14		Emi Rubiano	2019–present	First female city mayor

== Elections ==
- 1947 Rizal City local elections
- 1951 Pasay local elections
- 1955 Pasay local elections
- 1959 Pasay local elections
- 1963 Pasay local elections
- 1967 Pasay local elections
- 1971 Pasay local elections
- 1980 Pasay local elections
- 1988 Pasay local elections
- 1992 Pasay local elections
- 1995 Pasay local elections
- 1998 Pasay local elections
- 2000 Pasay mayoral recall election
- 2001 Pasay local elections
- 2004 Pasay local elections
- 2007 Pasay local elections
- 2010 Pasay local elections
- 2013 Pasay local elections
- 2016 Pasay local elections
- 2019 Pasay local elections
- 2022 Pasay local elections
- 2025 Pasay local elections
