= 2004 Pasay local elections =

City elections in Pasay, Philippines

2004 Pasay Mayoral Elections
- May 10, 2004
Nominee	Wenceslao "Peewee" Trinidad	Ricardo "Ding" Santos
Party	LDP	Lakas
Running mate	Antonino "Tony" Calixto	Gregorio "Greg" Alcera
Popular vote	89,288	71,687
Percentage	54.86	44.05
Mayor before election
Wenceslao Trinidad
LDP
Elected mayor
Wenceslao Trinidad
LDP

Local elections were held in Pasay on May 10, 2004 within the Philippine general election. The voters elected for the elective local posts in the city: the mayor, vice mayor, the representative for the lone district, and the councilors, six of them in the two districts of the city.

== Background ==
Mayor Wenceslao "Peewee" Trinidad ran for second term. His running mate was Vice Mayor Antonino "Tony" Calixto.

Retired Police Ricardo "Ding" Santos, former security aide of the late former Mayor Pablo Cuneta, ran for mayoralty post. His partner was former Vice Mayor Gregorio "Greg" Alcera.

Rep. Ma. Consuelo "Connie" Dy ran for a second term. Her opponent was Second District Councilor Imelda Calixto-Rubiano.

== Candidates ==
=== Administration's Ticket ===
==== Team Trinidad Calixto ====
KNP-LDP/Team Trinidad Calixto
Name	Party	Result
For House Of Representative
Emi Calixto-Rubiano	LDP	Lost
For Mayor
Peewee Trinidad	LDP	Won
For Vice Mayor
Tony Calixto	LDP	Won
For Councilor 1st District
Abet Alvina	LDP	Lost
Tonya Cuneta	LDP	Won
Lex Ibay	LDP	Won
Bing Petallo	LDP	Lost
Dr. Lito Roxas	LDP	Won
Miki Trinidad	LDP	Lost
For Councilor 2nd District
Moti Arceo	LDP	Won
Linda Hilario	LDP	Lost
Red Sternberg	LDP	Lost
Gerard Urbina	LDP	Lost
Ian Vendivel	LDP	Lost
Edith Vergel De Dios	LDP	Won

=== Opposition's Ticket ===
==== Team Kaibigan ====
Lakas–CMD/Team Kaibigan
Name	Party	Result
For House Of Representative
Tita Connie Dy	Lakas	Won
For Mayor
Ricardo "Ding" Santos	Lakas	Lost
For Vice Mayor
Greg Alcera	Lakas	Lost
For Councilor 1st District
Bogs Abelarde	Lakas	Lost
Richard Advincula	Lakas	Won
Jonathan "RJ" Cabrera	Lakas	Won
Jojie Claudio	Lakas	Lost
Rey Mateo	Lakas	Lost
Marlon Pesebre	Lakas	Won
For Councilor 2nd District
Onie Bayona	Lakas	Won
Tonton Cabrido	Lakas	Lost
Dedick Enriquez	Lakas	Lost
Irish Padua-Pineda	Lakas	Won
Allan Panaligan	Lakas	Won
Bong Tolentino	Lakas	Won

== Results ==
Names written in bold-Italic are the re-elected incumbents while in italic are incumbents lost in elections.

=== For Representative ===
Rep. Ma. Consuelo "Connie" Dy won over Second District Councilor Imelda "Emi" Calixto-Rubiano.

Representative of Pasay's Lone District
Party	Candidate	Votes	%
**Lakas**	**Ma. Consuelo "Connie" Dy**	**87,552**	**56.52**
LDP	Imelda Calixto-Rubiano	66,184	42.73
Independent	Justo Evangelista	669	0.43
Nacionalista	Crisanto Cornejo	488	0.32
Total votes		**154,893**	**100.00**
Lakas **hold**			

Popular vote percentage
**Dy**	56.52%
Calixto-Rubiano	42.73%
Evangelista	0.43%
Cornejo	0.32%

=== For Mayor ===
Mayor Wenceslao Trinidad defeated retired police officer Ricardo "Ding" Santos, who happened to be his opponent in a recall election in 2000.

Pasay Mayoralty Election
Party	Candidate	Votes	%
**LDP**	**Wenceslao "Peewee" Trinidad**	**89,288**	**54.86**
Lakas	Ricardo "Ding" Santos	71,687	44.05
Independent	Romulo "Rome" Marcelo Sr.	850	0.52
DGIPP	Rose Alejaga	540	0.33
PIBID	Francisco Peñaflor-Noel	395	0.24
Total votes		**162,754**	**100.00**
LDP **hold**			

Popular vote percentage
**Trinidad**	54.86%
Santos	44.05%
Marcelo	0.52%
Alejaga	0.33%
Peñaflor	0.24%

=== For Vice Mayor ===
Vice Mayor Antonino "Tony" Calixto was re-elected. He won in a tight election to former Vice Mayor Gregorio "Greg" Alcera.

Pasay Vice Mayoralty Election
Party	Candidate	Votes	%
**LDP**	**Antonino "Tony" Calixto**	**82,809**	**52.48**
Lakas	Gregorio "Greg" Alcera	73,782	46.76
PIBID	Jaybiline Dela Cruz	796	0.51
DGIPP	Jesus Guimba	395	0.25
Total votes		**157,782**	**100.00**
LDP **hold**			

Popular vote percentage
**Calixto**	52.48%
Alcera	46.76%
Dela Cruz	0.51%
Guimba	0.25%

=== For Councilors ===
==== First District ====
Four of the six incumbents were re-elected. Ma. Antonia "Tonya" Cuneta and Richard Advincula sealed their seats as newly elected councilors of the district. Advincula replaced his father, three-termer councilor Eduardo "Ed" Advincula. Cuneta is married to former Liga President and ex-officio councilor Generoso Cuneta.

Councilors Reynaldo Mateo and Ma. Luisa Petallo failed to secure their seats, placing 7th and 8th, respectively.

Member, City Council of Pasay's First District
Party	Candidate	Votes	%
**Lakas**	**Marlon Pesebre**	**39,342**	
**Lakas**	**Richard Advincula**	**37,700**	
**LDP**	**Lexter Ibay**	**37,611**	
**LDP**	**Jose Antonio "Lito" Roxas**	**37,375**	
**Lakas**	**Jonathan "RJ" Cabrera**	**34,216**	
**LDP**	**Ma. Antonia "Tonya" Cuneta**	**33,674**	
Lakas	Reynaldo "Rey" Mateo	32,825	
LDP	Ma. Luisa "Bing" Petallo	31,998	
Lakas	Joven "Jojie" Claudio	30,021	
LDP	Bonifacio "Miki" Trinidad	28,883	
LDP	Alberto "Abet" Alvina	23,915	
Lakas	Bogs Abelarde	15,084	
Independent	Rudy Borja	4,695	
Independent	Sonny Lim	3,560	
Independent	Cesar "Mata" Tibajia	3,367	
Independent	Marcelino Baldemor	1,768	
Independent	Charlie Salic	1,319	
DGIPP	Danny Detera	941	
DGIPP	Boy Miña	639	
Total votes		**397,033**	

==== Second District ====
Four of the six incumbents were re-elected.

Noel "Onie" Bayona, a former police officer, and cousin of Mayor Wenceslao "Peewee" Trinidad, placing 2nd, is the newly-elected councilor. Another newly-elected councilor, Irish Padua-Pineda, daughter of three-termer Councilor Reynaldo Padua, placed 6th.

Councilor Imelda "Emi" Calixto-Rubiano ran as representative but lost to re-electionist Ma. Consuelo "Connie" Dy.

Member, City Council of Pasay's Second District
Party	Candidate	Votes	%
**Lakas**	**Allan Panaligan**	**49,254**	
**Lakas**	**Noel "Onie" Bayona**	**44,357**	
**Lakas**	**Arvin "Bong" Tolentino**	**44,121**	
**LDP**	**Arnel Regino "Moti" Arceo**	**42,540**	
**LDP**	**Edita "Edith" Vergel De Dios**	**41,509**	
**Lakas**	**Irish Padua-Pineda**	**37,681**	
LDP	Ian Vendivel	35,634	
LDP	Erlinda "Linda" Hilario	29,225	
LDP	Red Sternberg	28,300	
LDP	Gerardo Urbina Jr.	25,375	
Lakas	Tonton Cabrido	15,268	
Lakas	Dedick Enriquez	9,507	
Independent	Freddie Payopay	4,249	
Independent	Bobby Monsod	3,875	
PIBID	Manny Jimenez	1,694	
Independent	Buddy Quimpo	1,641	
PIBID	Leo Cadion	1,442	
Independent	Geraldine Camo	1,226	
Independent	Rody Balbada	959	
DGIPP	Fortune Acodillo Jr.	742	
Total votes		**418,329**	
