= 2007 Pasay local elections =

16th city elections in Pasay, Philippines

2007 Pasay Mayoral Elections
- May 14, 2007
Nominee	Wenceslao "Peewee" Trinidad	Ma. Consuelo Dy
Party	LDP	KAMPI
Running mate	Antonino "Tony" Calixto	Arvin "Bong" Tolentino
Popular vote	72,446	66,444
Mayor before election
Wenceslao Trinidad
LDP
Elected mayor
Wenceslao Trinidad
LDP

Local elections were held in Pasay on May 14, 2007, within the Philippine general election. The voters elected for the elective local posts in the city: the mayor, vice mayor, the representative for the lone district, and the councilors, six of them in the two districts of the city.

== Events before election ==
In September 2006, Mayor Wenceslao "Peewee" Trinidad, Vice Mayor Antonino "Tony" Calixto, and 10 councilors (including 2 ex-officio councilors, the Liga ng mga Barangay president and SK federation president) were suspended for six months due to anomalous garbage collection and disposal contracts. This left Councilors Allan Panaligan and Arvin "Bong" Tolentino as acting mayor and vice mayor, respectively. Panaligan and Tolentino took oath before the DILG on September 4.

In January 2007, a month after the preventive suspension had been lifted, acting mayor Allan Panaligan barricaded the city hall due to a flock of Trinidad's supporters outside.

== Background ==
Mayor Wenceslao "Peewee" Trinidad ran for re-election. He faced Rep. Ma. Consuelo "Connie" Dy.

Vice Mayor Antonino "Tony" Calixto ran for re-election, He was challenged by former Acting Vice Mayor and Second District Councilor Arvin "Bong" Tolentino and former Vice Mayor Gregorio "Greg" Alcera.

Rep. Ma. Consuelo "Connie" Dy chose to ran as mayor. She chosen Former Acting Mayor and Second District Councilor Allan Panaligan to run in her place. Panaligan was challenged by Second District Councilor Dr. Jose Antonio "Lito" Roxas, Ricardo "Ding" Santos, former chief security aide of former Mayor Pablo Cuneta, and former Rep. Lorna Verano-Yap.

== Candidates ==
=== Administration Team ===
==== Team Trinidad Calixto Roxas ====
UNO/LDP
Name	Party	Result
For Representative
Lito Roxas	LDP	Won
For Mayor
Peewee Trinidad	LDP	Won
For Vice Mayor
Tony Calixto	LDP	Won
For Councilors- First District
Richard Advincula	LDP	Won
Abet Alvina	LDP	Lost
Charlie Chavez	LDP	Lost
Bombie Cipriano	LDP	Lost
Lexter Ibay	LDP	Won
Bing Petallo	LDP	Won
For Councilors- Second District
Moti Arceo	LDP	Won
Onie Bayona	LDP	Won
Emi Calixto	LDP	Won
Rey Padua	LDP	Won
Janet Protacio	LDP	Lost
Edith Vergel De Dios	LDP	Won

=== Opposition Team ===
==== Team Connie Dy ====
KAMPI
Name	Party	Result
For Representative
Allan Panaligan	KAMPI	Lost
For Mayor
Connie Dy	KAMPI	Lost
For Vice Mayor
Bong Tolentino	KAMPI	Lost
For Councilors- First District
Jonathan '"RJ" Cabrera	KAMPI	Won
Gina Catalan	KAMPI	Lost
Rey Mateo	KAMPI	Lost
Marlon Pesebre	KAMPI	Won
Johnny Santiago	KAMPI	Lost
Grace Santos	KAMPI	Won
For Councilors- Second District
Jimboy Baliad	KAMPI	Lost
Jojie Claudio	KAMPI	Lost
Linda Hilario	KAMPI	Lost
Reggie Lim	KAMPI	Lost
Lei Tolentino	KAMPI	Lost
Ian Vendivel	KAMPI	Won

==== Team Kaibigan ====
Lakas-CMD/Team Kaibigan
Name	Party	Result
For Representative
Ricardo "Ding" Santos	Lakas	Lost
For Councilors- First District
Babes Calixto	Lakas	Lost
Tony Garcia	Lakas	Lost
Lolit Miranda	Lakas	Lost
Chet Santos-Hortaleza	Lakas	Lost
Abet Reyes	Lakas	Lost
For Councilors- Second District
Jerry Arcangel	Lakas	Lost
Rolly Bacar	Lakas	Lost
Dedick Enriquez	Lakas	Lost
Val Magbanua	Lakas	Lost
Bobby Torres	Lakas	Lost
Tresie Vivas	Lakas	Lost

==== Liberal Party ====
Liberal Party
Name	Party	Result
For Representative
Lorna Verano-Yap	Liberal	Lost
For Vice Mayor
Greg Alcera	Liberal	Lost
For Councilors- First District
Wata Anuddin	Liberal	Lost
Justo "JJ"Justo	Liberal	Lost
Bimbo Lim	Liberal	Lost
Cesar "Sipag" Ochoa	Liberal	Lost
For Councilors- Second District
RC Boy Campo	Liberal	Lost
Manny Cinco	Liberal	Lost
Bobby Monsod	Liberal	Lost
Peping Nabong	Liberal	Lost

==== Aksyon Demokratiko ====
Aksyon Demokratiko
Name	Party	Result
For Councilor- Second District
Ileana Ibay	Aksyon	Lost

==== United Opposition ====
United Opposition
Name	Party	Result
For Mayor
Kit Noel-Peñaflor	UNO	Lost

==== Independent ====
Independent
Name	Party	Result
For Councilors- First District
Ed Advincula	Independent	Lost
Lino Baldemor	Independent	Lost
Rey Bayona	Independent	Lost
Tonya Cuneta	Independent	Lost
Sonny Lim	Independent	Lost
Frank Rebagoda Jr.	Independent	Lost
Ace Sevilla	Independent	Lost
Dr. Cesar Tibajia	Independent	Lost
For Councilors- Second District
Reyban Banares	Independent	Lost
Crisber Collantes	Independent	Lost
Leviste Cuneta	Independent	Lost
Ramon Jao	Independent	Lost
Imelda San Jose	Independent	Lost

== Results ==
Names written in bold-italic are the re-elected incumbents while in italic are incumbents lost in elections.

=== For Representative ===
Second District Councilor Jose Antonio Roxas defeated former Acting Mayor Allan Panaligan, retired police Ricardo "Ding" Santos, and former Rep. Lorna Verano-Yap.

Congressional Elections in Pasay's Lone District
Party	Candidate	Votes	%
**LDP**	**Jose Antonio "Lito" Roxas**	**49,902**	**38.74**
KAMPI	Allan Panaligan	45,167	35.06
Lakas	Ricardo "Ding" Santos	30,493	23.67
Liberal	Lorna Verano-Yap	2,349	1.82
Independent	Jose Cristobal	240	0.19
Independent	Saturnino Espeleta	177	0.14
Independent	Edgardo Santos	43	0.03
Total votes		**128,821**	**100.00**
LDP **gain** from KAMPI			

Popular vote percentage
**Roxas**	38.74%
Panaligan	35.06%
Santos	23.67%
Verano-Yap	1.82%
Cristobal	0.19%
Espeleta	0.14%
Santos	0.03%

=== For Mayor ===
Mayor Wenceslao "Peewee" Trinidad defeated Representative Ma. Consuelo "Connie" Dy in mayoral race.

Pasay Mayoralty Election
Party	Candidate	Votes	%
**LDP**	**Wenceslao "Peewee" Trinidad**	**72,446**	
KAMPI	Ma. Consuelo "Connie" Dy	66,444	
Independent	Ramon Trinidad		
UNO	Francisco Noel Peñaflor		
Independent	Nel Trinidad		
Independent	Romulo Marcelo Sr.		
Independent	Ralph Joseph		
LDP **hold**			

=== For Vice Mayor ===
Vice Mayor Antonino Calixto defeated former Acting Vice Mayor and Second District Councilor Arvin "Bong" Tolentino, and former Vice Mayor Gregorio "Greg" Alcera.

Pasay Vice Mayoralty Election
Party	Candidate	Votes	%
**LDP**	**Antonino "Tony" Calixto**	**77,280**	
KAMPI	Arvin "Bong" Tolentino	35,450	
Liberal	Gregorio "Greg" Alcera		
Independent	Maximo Agito		
Total votes			
LDP **hold**			

=== For Councilors ===
==== First District ====
Four of the six incumbents were re-elected. Former Councilor Ma. Luisa "Bing" Petallo made a successful city council comeback. Former Acting Councilor Mary Grace Santos sealed her seat as newly duly elected councilor of the district.

Former Councilors Eduardo "Ed" Advincula (father of re-electionist Richard Advincula), Reynaldo "Rey" Mateo, and Panfilo "Justo" Justo failed to secure a city council seat.

City Council Elections in Pasay's First District
Party	Candidate	Votes	%
**KAMPI**	**Marlon Pesebre**	**29,945**	
**LDP**	**Richard Advincula**	**25,973**	
**LDP**	**Lexter "Lex" Ibay**	**25,743**	
**KAMPI**	**Mary Grace Santos**	**24,948**	
**LDP**	**Ma. Luisa "Bing" Petallo**	**24,799**	
**KAMPI**	**Jonathan "RJ" Cabrera**	**22,147**	
LDP	Alberto "Abet" Alvina	21,795	
Independent	Ma. Antonia "Tonya" Cuneta	21,529	
KAMPI	Reynaldo "Rey" Mateo	19,030	
Independent	Eduardo "Ed" Advincula	13,212	
Total votes			

==== Second District ====
Three of the six incumbents were re-elected. Former Councilors Imelda "Emi" Calixto-Rubiano and Reynaldo Padua made a successful comeback in the city council. Calixto-Rubiano lost in congressional race in 2004 to then re-electionist Ma. Consuelo Dy. Ian Vendivel, who placed 6th, was the newly elected councilor in the district.

City Council Elections in Pasay's Second District
Party	Candidate	Votes	%
**LDP**	Imelda "Emi" Calixto-Rubiano	40,832	
**LDP**	Noel "Onie" Bayona	32,435	
**LDP**	Reynaldo "Rey" Padua	30,532	
**LDP**	Arnel Regino "Moti" Arceo	28,685	
**LDP**	Edita "Edith" Vergel De Dios	28,348	
**KAMPI**	Ian Vendivel	20,898	
Total votes			
