= 1998 Pasay local elections =

12th City elections in Pasay

1998 Pasay mayoral election
- May 11, 1998
Nominee	Jovito Claudio	Wenceslao Trinidad	Ricardo Santos
Party	Lakas	LAMMP	PROMDI
Alliance	Team Claudio-Ibay-Cuneta	Team Trinidad-Alcera-Vergel De Dios	Team Kaibigan
Running mate	Emmanuel Ibay	Greg Alcera	Cesar Santiago (NPC)
Popular vote	55,325	55,097	48,464
Percentage	33.86	33.72	29.66
Mayor before election
Pablo Cuneta
LDP
Elected mayor
Jovito Claudio
Lakas
- Vice mayoral election
Candidate	Greg Alcera	Emmanuel Ibay	Cesar Santiago
Party	LAMMP	Lakas	NPC
Alliance	Team Trinidad-Alcera-Vergel De Dios	Team Claudio-Ibay-Cuneta	Team Kaibigan
Popular vote	71,930	35,017	22,938
Percentage	49.68	24.19	15.84
Vice Mayor before election
Wenceslao Trinidad
LAMMP
Elected Vice Mayor
Greg Alcera
LAMMP

Local elections were held in Pasay on May 11, 1998 within the Philippine general election. The voters elected for the elective local posts in the city: the mayor, vice mayor, the representative for the lone district, and the councilors, six of them in the two districts of the city.

== Background ==
Mayor Pablo Cuneta did not run for re-election. Representative and former Mayor Jovito Claudio ran for mayor. He was challenged by Vice Mayor Wenceslao "Peewee" Trinidad and Ricardo "Ding" Santos, former security aide of Mayor Pablo Cuneta.

Second District Councilor Greg Alcera ran for Vice Mayor. He was challenged by Second District Councilor Emmanuel "Lito" Ibay, Edgardo "Arding" Cuneta, son of former Mayor Pablo Cuneta, and other candidates.

Rep. Jovito Claudio was on second term and ran as Mayor. Elinor "Elaine" Gamboa-Cuneta, wife of outgoing Mayor Pablo Cuneta ran for his place. Cuneta was challenged by Rolando "Ding" Briones, Edita "Edith" Vergel de Dios, former Councilor Rey Bagatsing, former OIC-Mayor Norman Urbina, Cesar "Sipag" Ochoa, Roland Ledesma, and independent Chris Cornejo.

== Candidates ==
=== Team Claudio-Ibay-Cuneta ===
LAKAS-NUCD-UMDP
Name	Party	Result
For House Of Representative
Elaine Gamboa-Cuneta	Lakas	Lost
For Mayor
Jovito Claudio	Lakas	Won
For Vice Mayor
Lito Ibay	Lakas	Lost
For Councilor 1st District
Ed Advincula	Lakas	Won
Bebot Bunye	Lakas	Lost
Chet Cuneta	Lakas	Lost
Encio Mateo	Lakas	Lost
Mar Matic	Lakas	Lost
Bing Petallo	Lakas	Lost
For Councilor 2nd District
Moti Arceo	Lakas	Lost
Linda Hilario	Lakas	Lost
Willy Lim	Lakas	Lost
Allan Panaligan	Lakas	Won
Tony Protacio	Lakas	Lost
Bong Tolentino	Lakas	Won

=== Team Trinidad-Alcera-Vergel De Dios ===
LAMMP
Name	Party	Result
For House Of Representative
Edith Vergel De Dios	LAMMP	Lost
For Mayor
Peewee Trinidad	LAMMP	Lost
For Vice Mayor
Greg Alcera	LAMMP	Won
For Councilor (1st District)
Ric Arabia	LAMMP	Lost
Romy Cabrera	LAMMP	Won
Tony Calixto	LAMMP	Won
Justo "JJ" Justo	LAMMP	Won
Teddy Lorca	LAMMP	Lost
Marlon Pesebre	LAMMP	Lost
For Councilor (2nd District)
Obet Alvarez	LAMMP	Lost
Emi Calixto-Rubiano	LAMMP	Won
Ruben Cura	LAMMP	Lost
Albert Paredes	LAMMP	Lost
Eddie San Jose	LAMMP	Lost
Pete Tianzon	LAMMP	Won

=== Team Kaibigan ===
PROMDI-NPC
Name	Party	Result
For House Of Representative
Rolando Briones	NPC	Won
For Mayor
Ricardo "Ding" Santos	PROMDI	Lost
For Vice Mayor
Cesar Santiago	NPC	Lost
For Councilor (1st District)
Rico Cordora	NPC	Lost
Oscar De Guia	NPC	Lost
Rey Mateo	NPC	Won
Abet Reyes	NPC	Lost
Jose Antonio Roxas	NPC	Won
Cesar Tibajia	NPC	Lost
For Councilor (2nd District)
Federico Medina-Cue	NPC	Lost
Ding Morales	NPC	Lost
Inday Rose Laguim	NPC	Lost
Pepe Lapira	NPC	Lost
Rofina Lovina	NPC	Lost
Ian Vendivel	NPC	Lost

== Results ==
Names written in bold-Italic are the re-elected incumbents while in italic are incumbents lost in elections.

=== For District Representative ===
Incumbent Jovito Claudio of Lakas–NUCD–UMDP retired to run for Mayor of Pasay. Lakas–NUCD–UMDP nominated Elaine Cuneta, who was defeated by Rolando Briones of the Nationalist People's Coalition.

Candidate	Party	Votes	%
**Rolando Briones**	Nationalist People's Coalition	47,292	31.33
Edita Vergel de Dios	Laban ng Makabayang Masang Pilipino	38,920	25.79
Elaine Cuneta	Lakas–NUCD–UMDP	21,859	14.48
Reynaldo Bagatsing	Liberal Party	18,892	12.52
Cesar Ochoa	Aksyon Demokratiko	14,937	9.90
Norma Urbina	Partido para sa Demokratikong Reporma	8,189	5.43
Crisanto Cornejo	Independent	485	0.32
Rolando Ledesma	Kilusang Bagong Lipunan	364	0.24
**Total**		**150,938**	**100.00**
Nationalist People's Coalition gain from Lakas–NUCD–UMDP			
Source: Commission on Elections

=== For Mayor ===
Representative and former Mayor Jovito Claudio won in a tight election to Vice Mayor Wenceslao Trinidad with a margin of 228 votes.

1998 Pasay mayoral election
Candidate	Party	Votes	%
**Jovito Claudio**	Lakas–NUCD–UMDP	55,325	33.86
Wenceslao Trinidad	Laban ng Makabayang Masang Pilipino	55,097	33.72
Ricardo Santos	PROMDI	48,464	29.66
Rene Saraza	Kabalikat ng Malayang Pilipino	3,909	2.39
Benjamin Perez	Independent	267	0.16
Romulo Marcelo Sr.	Kilusang Bagong Lipunan	136	0.08
Francisco Peñaflor-Noel	Independent	128	0.08
Florencio Muga	Independent	58	0.04
**Total**		**163,384**	**100.00**
Lakas–NUCD–UMDP gain from Laban ng Demokratikong Pilipino			
Source: Commission on Elections

=== For Vice Mayor ===
Second District Councilor Gregorio "Greg" Alcera was elected.

1998 Pasay vice mayoral election
Candidate	Party	Votes	%
**Greg Alcera**	Laban ng Makabayang Masang Pilipino	71,930	49.68
Emmanuel Ibay	Lakas–NUCD–UMDP	35,017	24.19
Cesar Santiago	Nationalist People's Coalition	22,938	15.84
Edgardo Cuneta	Partido para sa Demokratikong Reporma	13,342	9.22
Angel Valloyas	Liberal Party	861	0.59
Leony Legaspi	Independent	688	0.48
**Total**		**144,776**	**100.00**
Laban ng Makabayang Masang Pilipino hold			
Source: Commission on Elections

=== For Councilor ===
==== First District ====
Four of the six incumbents were re-elected. Uldarico Arabia and Teodulo Lorca Jr. were lost in the elections. Newly-elected councilors were Jose Antonio Roxas and Reynaldo Mateo, brother of former Councilor Florencio Mateo.

Member, City Council of Pasay's First District
Party	Candidate	Votes	%
**LAMMP**	**Antonino "Tony" Calixto**	**33,400**	
**LAMMP**	**Panfilo "Justo" Justo**	**27,441**	
**LAMMP**	**Romulo "Romy" Cabrera**	**22,997**	
**Lakas**	**Eduardo "Ed" Advincula**	**21,866**	
**NPC**	**Jose Antonio "Lito" Roxas**	**21,560**	
**NPC**	**Reynaldo "Rey" Mateo**	**20,517**	
LAMMP	Uldarico "Ric" Arabia	19,803	
LAMMP	Marlon Pesebre	19,244	
Lakas	Cesar Joseph "Chet" Cuneta	16,311	
LAMMP	Teodulo "Teddy" Lorca Jr.	14,407	
Lakas	Ma. Luisa "Bing" Petallo	13,722	
NPC	Rico Cordora	12,885	
Independent	Leonides Cuneta	12,619	
Independent	Sonny Lim	12,199	
NPC	Oscar De Guia	10,660	
PDP–Laban	Jovi Angel	10,282	
NPC	Abet Reyes	10,149	
Independent	Bobi Austria	9,082	
Lakas	Florencio "Encio" Mateo	9,047	
NPC	Cesar Tibajia	8,580	
Lakas	Bebot Bunye	7,745	
Reporma	Bogs Abelarde	6,083	
Reporma	Nonoy Hilvano	5,721	
Lakas	Mar Matic	5,441	
Reporma	Abe Rogacion	4,737	
KAMPI	Felipe Tauro	4,433	
KAMPI	John Jatico	3,856	
Independent	Pat Cuneta	3,633	
Reporma	Irma Lovina	3,416	
KAMPI	Ramon Viana	1,579	
KAMPI	Prince Kahulugan	1,359	
KAMPI	Ben Tejero	1,336	
Independent	Mina Cuneta	1,307	
Independent	Rafael Ungria	842	
KAMPI	Sim Celo	646	
Total votes			

==== Second District ====
One of the six incumbents was re-elected. Gregorio Alcera ran and won as Vice Mayor. Emmanuel Ibay ran for vice mayor but lost. Alberto Alvarez did not run for re-election. Edita Vergel de Dios ran for representative but lost to Rolando Briones. Roberto Alvarez ran but lost. Nelwy-elected councilors were Allan Panaligan, Ma. Consuelo Dy, Imelda Calixto-Rubiano, Arvin "Bong" Tolentino and Pedro Tianzon.

Member, City Council of Pasay's Second District
Party	Candidate	Votes	%
**Lakas**	**Allan Panaligan**	**38,808**	
**Independent**	**Ma. Consuelo "Connie" Dy**	**33,027**	
**Reporma**	**Reynaldo "Rey" Padua**	**32,534**	
**LAMMP**	**Emi Calixto-Rubiano**	**29,288**	
**Lakas**	**Arvin "Bong" Tolentino**	**28,286**	
**LAMMP**	**Pedro "Pete" Tianzon**	**25,857**	
LAMMP	Albert Paredes	24,882	
LAMMP	Roberto "Obet" Alvarez	24,646	
Lakas	Arnel Regino "Moti" Arceo	21,546	
LAMMP	Ruben Cura	18,650	
NPC	Ian Vendivel	17,481	
Lakas	Tony Protacio	15,061	
Lakas	Erlinda "Linda" Hilario	14,784	
LAMMP	Eddie San Jose	12,524	
NPC	Pepe Lapira	9,151	
NPC	Federico Medina-Cue	8,146	
NPC	Ding Morales	8,125	
Lakas	Willy Lim	6,913	
NPC	Rofina Lovina	6,755	
NPC	Inday Rose Laguim	6,345	
Reporma	Tony Ramirez	5,471	
Reporma	Dante San Jose	5,256	
Aksyon	Rupert Bautista	4,422	
KAMPI	Ed Hidalgo	1,756	
PDP–Laban	Pete Ordiales	1,674	
KAMPI	Lou Madraso	912	
KAMPI	Ernesto Legaspi	905	
Independent	Elmer Lopez	718	
KAMPI	Boy Santos	688	
KBL	Nida Gomez	637	
KAMPI	Nestor Rapi	530	
KAMPI	Joey Ramos	469	
KBL	Mel Vicente	418	
Independent	Jojie Claudio	4	
KBL	Mario Conui	2	
Total votes			

== Aftermath ==
In May 1998, Trinidad filed an electoral protest before the COMELEC due to alleged irregularities found in the election returns and canvass, but the COMELEC upheld Claudio's proclamation in June 1998. The protest was later dismissed by the Supreme Court on December 15, 1999.
