= 2010 Pasay local elections =

17th City elections in Pasay

2010 Pasay Mayoral Elections
- May 10, 2010
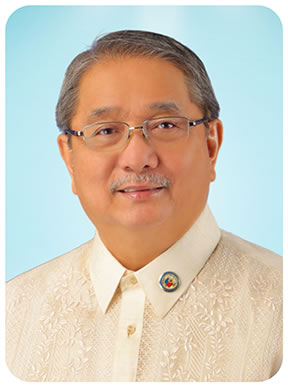
Nominee	Antonino "Tony" Calixto	Ma. Consuelo "Connie" Dy	Wenceslao "Peewee" Trinidad
Party	Liberal	PMP	Nacionalista
Alliance	Team Calixto	Team Connie Dy	Team Trinidad-Alcera-Roxas
Running mate	Arnel Regino "Moti" Arceo	Marlon Pesebre	Gregorio "Greg" Alcera
Popular vote	59,087	56,576	46,178
Percentage	33.71	32.28	26.35
Mayor before election
Wenceslao "Peewee" Trinidad
Nacionalista
Elected mayor
Antonino "Tony" Calixto
Liberal
- Vice mayoral election
Candidate	Marlon Pesebre	Noel "Onie" Bayona	Gregorio "Greg" Alcera
Party	PMP	PDP–Laban	Nacionalista
Alliance	Team Connie Dy	Team Bayona	Team Trinidad Alcera Roxas
Popular vote	58,942	32,826	31,776
Percentage	35.08%	19.54%	18.91%
Vice Mayor before election
Antonino Calixto
Liberal
Elected Vice Mayor
Marlon Pesebre
PMP

Local elections were held in Pasay on May 10, 2010, as part of the general elections. Voters elected the mayor, vice-mayor, representative of the city's lone district in House of Representatives and six members of the city council in each district.

== Background ==
Mayor Wenceslao "Peewee" Trinidad was on his third non-consecutive term and he ran for re-election for fourth non-consecutive term. He won in 2000 recall election and continued the unexpired term of then-Mayor Jovito Claudio until 2001. He ran for first full term on 2001 and won, and was re-elected on 2004. In 2006, he, Vice Mayor Calixto, and 10 other councilors were suspended for six months due to anomalous garbage collection and disposal contracts. Due to suspension, his term was cut, making him eligible to seek another three consecutive term. He ran for re-election on 2007 and won again. He was challenged by Vice Mayor Antonino "Tony" Calixto, Rep. Ma. Consuelo "Connie" Dy, retired police Ricardo "Ding" Santos, and independent candidates Romulo "Rome" Marcelo, Ralph Joseph Lim, and Francisco "Kit" Peñaflor.

Vice Mayor Antonino "Tony" Calixto was on his third term, and he was term-limited. He ran as mayor instead. His party chosen Second District Councilor Arnel Regino "Moti" Arceo. Arceo was challenged by First District Councilor Marlon Pesebre, Second District Councilor Noel "Onie" Bayona, former Vice Mayor Gregorio "Greg" Alcera, and Leopoldo "Babes" Calixto II.

Rep. Jose Antonio "Lito" Roxas was on his first term, and he ran for re-election for second term. He was challenged by Second District Councilor Imelda "Emi" Calixto-Rubiano, former Acting Mayor Allan Panaligan, and Rica-Elah Santos-Hortaleza. Hortaleza was the daughter of mayoral candidate Ricardo "Ding" Santos.

== Candidates ==
=== Administration ticket ===
Team Trinidad Alcera Roxas (Nacionalista Party)
Name	Party
For House Of Representative
Dr. Lito Roxas	Lakas–Kampi
For Mayor
Peewee Trinidad	Nacionalista
For Vice Mayor
Greg Alcera	Nacionalista
For Councilor (1st District)
Abet Alvina	Nacionalista
Charlie Chavez	Nacionalista
Pinky Lyn Francisco	Nacionalista
Lex Ibay	Nacionalista
Let Landagan	Nacionalista
Encio Mateo	Nacionalista
For Councilor (2nd District)
Jimboy Baliad	Nacionalista
Manny Cinco	Nacionalista
Janet Cortes	Nacionalista
Ileana Ibay	Nacionalista
Monty Veluz	Nacionalista
Edith Vergel De Dios	Nacionalista

=== Opposition tickets ===
Team Calixto (Liberal Party)
Name	Party
For House Of Representative
Emi Calixto-Rubiano	Liberal
For Mayor
Tony Calixto	Liberal
For Vice Mayor
Moti Arceo	Liberal
For Councilor (1st District)
Richard Advincula	Liberal
Teddy Lorca	Liberal
Rey Mateo	Liberal
Lolit Miranda	Liberal
Bing Petallo	Liberal
Bert Roque	Liberal
For Councilor (2nd District)
Chris Barrios	Liberal
Jojie Claudio	Liberal
Norton Elipio	Liberal
Rey Padua	Liberal
Bumbay Tengco	Liberal
Ian Vendivel	Liberal

Team Connie Dy (Pwersa ng Masang Pilipino)
Name	Party
For House Of Representative
Allan Panaligan	PMP
For Mayor
Connie Dy	PMP
For Vice Mayor
Marlon Pesebre	PMP
For Councilor (1st District)
Romy Cabrera	PMP
Von Catalan III	PMP
Angelo Nonoy Decena	PMP
Rev Langub	PMP
JV Lim	PMP
Grace Santos	PMP
For Councilor (2nd District)
Jerry Arcangel	PMP
Alvin Cruzin	PMP
Linda Hilario	PMP
Junjun Mitra	PMP
Ate Jen Panaligan	PMP
Bong Tolentino	PMP

Team Kaibigan (Bigkis Pinoy)
Name	Party
For House Of Representative
Chet Santos-Hortaleza	Bigkis
For Mayor
Ding Santos	Bigkis
For Vice Mayor
Babes Calixto	Bigkis
For Councilor (1st District)
Tony Co	Bigkis
Carding Corral	Bigkis
Val Ilagan	Bigkis
Bimbo Lim	Bigkis
Gani Lisaca	Bigkis
Abe Rogacion	Bigkis
For Councilor (2nd District)
Rolly Bacar	Bigkis
Tonton Cabrido	Bigkis
Risa De Leon	Bigkis
Pete Ordiales	Bigkis
Ben Patinio	Bigkis
Cristan Tan	Bigkis

Team Bayona (PDP–Laban)
Name	Party
For Vice Mayor
Onie Bayona	PDP–Laban
For Councilor (1st District)
James Bontilao	PDP–Laban
Bombie Cipriano	PDP–Laban
Eddie Cruz	PDP–Laban
Nonoy Hilvano	PDP–Laban
Jojo Mañez	PDP–Laban
Bong Tebelin	PDP–Laban
For Councilor (2nd District)
Brian Bayona	PDP–Laban
RC Boy Campo	PDP–Laban
Dedick Enriquez	PDP–Laban
Val Magbanua	PDP–Laban
Peping Nabong	PDP–Laban
Rodolf Villaluna	PDP–Laban

== Results ==
Names written in bold-Italic are the re-elected incumbents while in italic are incumbents lost in elections.

=== For Representative, Lone District of Pasay ===
Rep. Jose Antonio "Lito" Roxas was defeated by Second District Councilor Imelda Calixto-Rubiano. Rubiano won in a tight election between Roxas and Panaligan.

Congressional Election in Pasay's Lone District
Party	Candidate	Votes	%
**Liberal**	**Imelda Calixto-Rubiano**	**66,443**	**41.27**
Lakas–Kampi	Jose Antonio Roxas	53,304	33.11
PMP	Allan Panaligan	32,857	20.24
Bigkis	Rica-Elah Santos-Hortaleza	8,667	5.38
Total votes		**161,001**	**100.00**
Liberal **hold**			

Popular vote percentage
**Calixto-Rubiano**	41.27%
Roxas	33.11%
Panaligan	20.24%
Hortaleza	5.38%

=== For Mayor ===
Mayor Wenceslao "Peewee" Trinidad was defeated by Vice Mayor Antonino "Tony" Calixto. Calixto won in a tight election between Dy and Trinidad.

Pasay Mayoral Elections
Party	Candidate	Votes	%
**Liberal**	**Antonino "Tony" Calixto**	**59,087**	**33.71**
PMP	Ma. Consuelo "Connie" Dy	56,576	32.28
Nacionalista	Wenceslao "Peewee" Trinidad	46,178	26.35
Bigkis	Ricardo "Ding" Santos	12,616	7.20
Independent	Ralph Joseph Lim	298	0.17
Independent	Romulo "Rome" Marcelo Sr.	281	0.16
Independent	Francisco Noel "Kit" Peñaflor	268	0.15
Total votes		**183,618**	**100.00**
Liberal **hold**			

Popular vote percentage
**Calixto**	33.71%
Dy	32.28%
Trinidad	26.35%
Santos	7.20%
Lim	0.17%
Marcelo	0.16%
Penaflor	0.15%

=== For Vice Mayor ===
First District Councilor Marlon Pesebre won in a tight election between Bayona, Alcera, and Arceo.

Pasay Vice Mayoral Elections
Party	Candidate	Votes	%
**PMP**	**Marlon Pesebre**	**58,942**	**35.08**
PDP–Laban	Noel "Onie" Bayona	32,826	19.54
Nacionalista	Gregorio "Greg" Alcera	31,776	18.91
Liberal	Arnel Regino "Moti" Arceo	27,257	16.22
Bigkis	Leopoldo "Babes" Calixto II	17,216	10.25
Total votes		**168,017**	**100.00**
PMP **hold**			

Popular vote percentage
Pesebre	35.08%
Bayona	19.54%
Alcera	18.91%
Arceo	16.22%
Calixto	10.25%

=== For Councilor ===
==== First District ====
Three of the six incumbents were re-elected, namely:

- Mary Grace Santos
- Richard Advincula
- Lexter "Lex" Ibay

Three other incumbents were:

- Marlon Pesebre, ran as Vice Mayor and won.
- Ma. Luisa "Bing" Petallo, ran for re-election but lost, placing **7th**.
- Jonathan "RJ" Cabrera, term-limited and replaced by his father, former Councilor Romulo Cabrera but lost, placing **8th**.

The newly-elected councilors were Alberto "Abet" Alvina and Pinky Lyn Francisco.

The former councilors who tried to return in city council were:

- Romulo Cabrera, father of three-termer Councilor Jonathan "RJ" Cabrera, ran but lost, placing **8th**.
- Reynaldo Mateo, ran but lost, placing **12th**.
- Florencio "Encio" Mateo, ran but lost, placing **13th**.
- Teodulo "Teddy" Lorca Jr. ran but lost, placing **19th**.

City Council Elections in Pasay's First District
Party	Candidate	Votes	%
**PMP**	**Mary Grace Santos**	**37,798**	
**Liberal**	**Richard Advincula**	**31,557**	
**Nacionalista**	**Lexter "Lex" Ibay**	**31,163**	
**Independent**	**Eduardo "Ed" Advincula**	**22,295**	
**Nacionalista**	**Alberto "Abet" Alvina**	**22,186**	
**Nacionalista**	**Pinky Lyn Francisco**	**21,281**	
Liberal	Ma. Luisa "Bing" Petallo	19,881	
PMP	Romulo Cabrera	19,723	
PMP	Angelo "Nonoy" Decena	17,821	
Nacionalista	Charlie Chavez	17,434	
Nacionalista	Maria Lita "Letlet" Landagan	16,033	
Liberal	Reynaldo Mateo	15,681	
Nacionalista	Florencio "Encio" Mateo	15,132	
PMP	Jaivic "JV" Lim	14,737	
Independent	Normandy Pangilinan	12,808	
Independent	Reynaldo "Rey" Bayona Jr.	11,772	
PDP–Laban	Jose "Jojo" Mañez	8,869	
Bigkis	Arcadio "Carding" Corral	8,354	
Liberal	Teodulo "Teddy" Lorca Jr.	7,701	
Liberal	Lolita Miranda	7,521	
Bigkis	Benjamin "Bimbo" Lim Jr.	7,052	
PMP	Ronald Langub	6,607	
Independent	Rossano Cuneta	5,937	
PMP	Primo Von Catalan III	5,773	
PDP–Laban	Jaime Bontilao	5,410	
Bigkis	Valentino "Val" Ilagan	5,146	
Bigkis	Antonio "Tony" Co	4,897	
Liberal	Lamberto "Bert" Roque	4,782	
Independent	Edmund Cayetano	4,497	
PDP–Laban	Eduardo "Eddie" Cruz	4,197	
PDP–Laban	Jose Allan "Bong" Tebelin	2,715	
PDP–Laban	Celestino "Nonoy" Hilvano	2,454	
PDP–Laban	Rolando "Borbie" Cipriano	2,146	
Bigkis	Abelardo "Abe" Rogacion	1,999	
Bangon Pilipinas	Domingo "Jonjon" Solangon	1,800	
Bigkis	Isagani "Gani" Lisaca	1,755	
Independent	Michael Angelo Gabriel	1,461	
Independent	Maria Remedios "Ging" Diaz	1,191	
Independent	Alejandro Mendoza Jr	1,107	
Independent	Antonio Obiña	975	
Independent	Liong Ming Sy	880	
Independent	Juanito Cacayan Jr.	635	
Total votes			

==== Second District ====
Three of the six incumbents were re-elected, namely:

- Reynaldo "Rey" Padua Sr.
- Edita "Edith" Vergel De Dios
- Ian Vendivel

Three other incumbents were:

- Imelda "Emi" Calixto-Rubiano, ran as representative and won.
- Noel "Onie" Bayona, ran as Vice Mayor but lost.
- Arnel Regino "Moti" Arceo, ran as Vice Mayor but lost.

The newly-elected councilors were:

- Ileana Ibay, daughter of former Councilor Emmanuel "Lito" Ibay
- Former SK Federation President Brian Bayona, son of vice mayoral candidate Noel "Onie" Bayona.
- Former Acting Vice Mayor Arvin "Bong" Tolentino

Joven "Jojie" Claudio, son of former Mayor Jovito Claudio; Aileen Padua-Lopez, daughter of re-electionist Reynaldo "Rey" Padua; and Jennifer "Jen" Panaligan, wife of former Acting Mayor and Second District Councilor Allan Panaligan were both lost.

City Council Elections in Pasay's Second District
Party	Candidate	Votes	%
**Liberal**	**Reynaldo "Rey" Padua**	**31,895**	
**Nacionalista**	**Edita "Edith" Vergel De Dios**	**28,113**	
**Nacionalista**	**Ileana Ibay**	**27,302**	
**Liberal**	**Ian Vendivel**	**25,032**	
**PDP–Laban**	**Brian Bayona**	**23,694**	
**PMP**	**Arvin "Bong" Tolentino**	**22,788**	
Liberal	Joven "Jojie" Claudio	21,459	
Independent	Aileen Padua-Lopez	21,134	
PMP	Jennifer "Jen" Panaligan	19,825	
Bigkis	Marissa "Risa" De Leon	16,978	
Nacionalista	Jim "Jimboy" Baliad	16,648	
PMP	Alvin Cruzin	16,448	
Independent	Editha "Wowee" Manguerra	15,967	
PMP	Elmer "Junjun" Mitra Jr.	14,603	
PMP	Erlinda "Linda" Hilario	14,423	
Nacionalista	Montgomery "Monty" Veluz	13,769	
Nacionalista	Emmanuel "Manny" Cinco	13,694	
Nacionalista	Janet Cortes	10,451	
Liberal	Joseph Norton Elipio	9,629	
PMP	Juanito "Jerry" Arcangel	9,584	
PDP–Laban	Reynold "RC" Campo	9,549	
Liberal	Chris Barrios	6,568	
Bigkis	Rolando "Rolly" Bacar	6,066	
Liberal	Ruben "Bumbay" Tengco	5,458	
Bigkis	Generoso "Tonton" Cabrido Jr.	5,405	
NPC	Rolando "Rolly" Dela Cruz	5,256	
PDP–Laban	Valeriano "Val" Magbanua	4,219	
Bigkis	Benito Patinio	4,180	
Independent	Imelda "Mel" San Jose	3,587	
PDP–Laban	Rizalito "Dedick" Enriquez	3,505	
Independent	Fernand "Bong" Abriolsantos	3,479	
Independent	Edgar Louie Eusebio	3,399	
Bigkis	Cristopher "Cristan" Tan	3,351	
PDP–Laban	Pepito "Peping" Nabong	2,306	
NPC	Mark Anthony "Chuck" San Juan	2,215	
Bigkis	Pedro "Pete" Ordiales	2,089	
Independent	Vicente "Vic" Gine	1,624	
PDP–Laban	Rodolfo Villaluna Jr.	1,211	
Independent	Rogelio Estrella	1,194	
Independent	Saturnino "Bong" Espeleta	694	
NPC	Salvador "Buddy" Quimpo III	658	
Independent	Romeo Franks	564	
Independent	Richard Rivera	559	
Independent	Crisber Collantes	557	
Independent	Arthur Quozon	220	
Total votes			

== Note ==
Mayor Wenceslao "Peewee" Trinidad was elected as Mayor following the 2000 Pasay mayoral recall election, replacing then-Mayor Jovito Claudio. Trinidad started his first full term as mayor in 2001, and was re-elected in 2004. In 2006, Trinidad, Vice Mayor Antonino Calixto, and nine out of twelve city councilors were put into a six-month preventive suspension due to anomalous garbage collection contracts in 2004 and 2005. Then-Councilor Allan Panaligan served as acting Mayor for six months until the suspension order was lifted in February 2007. According to 1987 Constitution, all elective government officials (except the President and Vice President) can serve for three consecutive full term. Trinidad's supposedly third consecutive term will end in 2010, but due to the suspension, the former's consecutive term was cut, therefore he can run again for another consecutive term thrice.
