= 1995 Pasay local elections =

11th City elections in Pasay

1995 Pasay mayoral election
- May 8, 1995
Nominee	Pablo Cuneta	Rolando Briones
Party	LDP	Lakas
Running mate	Wenceslao Trinidad	Moti Arceo
Popular vote	72,032	59,177
Percentage	54.72	44.96
Mayor before election
Pablo Cuneta
Independent
Elected mayor
Pablo Cuneta
LDP

Local elections were held in Pasay on May 8, 1995 within the Philippine general election. The voters elected for the elective local posts in the city: the mayor, vice mayor, the representative for the lone district, and the councilors, six of them in the two districts of the city.

== Background ==
Mayor Pablo Cuneta ran for reelection, with Vice Mayor Wenceslao Trinidad as his running mate. They will face the tandem of 1992 mayoral candidate Rolando Briones and Councilor Moti Arceo.

Representative Jovito Claudio also ran for reelection. His main opponent is Elaine Gamboa-Cuneta, wife of Mayor Cuneta.

== Candidates ==
=== Team Cuneta-Trinidad ===
Team Cuneta-Trinidad
Name	Party	Result
For House Of Representative
Elaine Gamboa-Cuneta	LDP	Lost
For Mayor
Pablo Cuneta	LDP	Won
For Vice Mayor
Peewee Trinidad	LDP	Won
For Councilor (1st District)
Ric Arabia	Independent	Won
Romy Cabrera	Independent	Won
Antonino Calixto	Independent	Won
Teddy Lorca	Independent	Won
Irma Lovina	NPC	Lost
Encio Mateo	NPC	Lost
For Councilor (2nd District)
Greg Alcera	Independent	Won
Obet Alvarez	Independent	Won
Albert Paredes	Independent	Won
Tony Protacio	Independent	Lost
Benjamin Reyes	Independent	Lost
Roca Rocabela	PRP	Lost

=== Team Briones-Arceo-Claudio ===
Lakas-NUCD-UMDP
Name	Party	Result
For House Of Representative
Jovito Claudio	Lakas	Won
For Mayor
Rolando Briones	Lakas	Lost
For Vice Mayor
Moti Arceo	Lakas	Lost
For Councilor 1st District
Ed Advincula	Lakas	Won
Bebot Bunye	Lakas	Lost
Rachel Delos Santos	Lakas	Lost
Tony Garcia	Lakas	Lost
Jorge Llamas	Lakas	Lost
Bing Petallo	Lakas	Lost
For Councilor 2nd District
Boy Araneta	Lakas	Lost
Eric Fajardo	Lakas	Lost
Rick Garbin	Lakas	Lost
Joey Paez	Lakas	Lost
Allan Panaligan	Lakas	Lost
Nick Reyes	Lakas	Lost

== Results ==
Names written in bold-Italic are the re-elected incumbents while in italic are incumbents lost in elections.

=== For Representative ===
Incumbent Jovito Claudio of Lakas–NUCD–UMDP was re-elected to a second term.

Candidate	Party	Votes	%
**Jovito Claudio (incumbent)**	Lakas–NUCD–UMDP	67,405	55.58
Elaine Cuneta	Laban ng Demokratikong Pilipino	53,863	44.42
**Total**		**121,268**	**100.00**
Source: Commission on Elections

=== For Mayor ===
Mayor Pablo Cuneta was reelected.

Candidate	Party	Votes	%
**Pablo Cuneta (incumbent)**	Laban ng Demokratikong Pilipino	72,032	54.72
Rolando Briones	Lakas–NUCD–UMDP	59,177	44.96
Romulo Marcelo Sr.	Independent	302	0.23
Francisco Peñaflor-Noel	Independent	125	0.09
**Total**		**131,636**	**100.00**
Laban ng Demokratikong Pilipino hold			
Source: Commission on Elections

=== For Vice Mayor ===
Vice Mayor Wenceslao Trinidad was reelected.

Candidate	Party	Votes	%
**Wenceslao Trinidad**	Laban ng Demokratikong Pilipino	68,214	52.73
Arnel Regino Arceo	Lakas–NUCD–UMDP	48,422	37.43
Cesar Ochoa	Independent	12,167	9.41
Leony Legaspi	Independent	551	0.43
**Total**		**129,354**	**100.00**
Laban ng Demokratikong Pilipino hold			
Source: Commission on Elections

=== For Councilor ===
==== First District ====
Three of the six incumbents were re-elected. Newly-elected councilors were Antonino Calixto, son of former Vice Mayor and Acting Mayor Eduardo Calixto who placed 1st, Teodulo Lorca Jr. who placed 5th, and Eduardo Advincula who placed 6th.

Member, City Council of Pasay's First District
Party	Candidate	Votes	%
**Independent**	Antonino Calixto	31,415	
**Independent**	Justo Justo (incumbent)	25,291	
**Independent**	Romulo "Romy" Cabrera (incumbent)	25,243	
**Independent**	Uldarico "Ric" Arabia (incumbent)	22,405	
**Lakas**	Eduardo "Ed" Advincula	20,774	
**Independent**	Teodulo "Teddy" Lorca Jr.	16,985	
Total votes			

==== Second District ====
Four of the six incumbents were re-elected. Newly-elected councilors were Emmanuel Ibay and Reynaldo Padua.

Member, City Council of Pasay's Second District
Party	Candidate	Votes	%
**Independent**	Gregorio "Greg" Alcera (incumbent)	37,836	
**PRP**	Emmanuel "Lito" Ibay	28,202	
**PRP**	Reynaldo "Rey" Padua	24,352	
**Independent**	Roberto "Obet" Alvarez (incumbent)	23,769	
**Independent**	Edita "Edith" Vergel de Dios (incumbent)	23,484	
**Independent**	Albert Paredes (incumbent)	21,189	
Total votes			
