= 2016 Pasay local elections =

19th City elections in Pasay

2016 Pasay mayoral election
- May 9, 2016
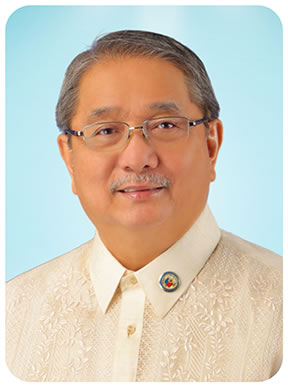
Nominee	Antonino "Tony" Calixto	Jose Antonio "Lito" Roxas
Party	Liberal	UNA
Running mate	Noel "Boyet" Del Rosario	Marlon Pesebre
Popular vote	113,751	42,694
Percentage	62.28	23.38
Mayor before election
Antonino G. Calixto
Liberal
Elected mayor
Antonino G. Calixto
Liberal
- Vice mayoral election
Candidate	Noel "Boyet" Del Rosario	Marlon Pesebre
Party	Liberal	NPC
Alliance	Team Calixto	Team Reporma; Team Roxas; United Opposition
Popular vote	94,829	81,799
Percentage	53.69%	46.31%
Vice Mayor before election
Marlon Pesebre
NPC
Elected Vice Mayor
Noel "Boyet" Del Rosario
Liberal

Local elections were held in Pasay on May 9, 2016, within the Philippine general election. The voters elected for the elective local posts in the city: the mayor, vice mayor, the congressman, and the councilors, six of them in the two districts of the city.

== Background ==
Mayor Antonino “Tony” Calixto was on his second term, and he ran for re-election for third term under Liberal Party. His opponents were:

- Former Representative, Dr. Jose Antonio “Lito” Roxas
- businessman Jorge Del Rosario
- Romulo Marcelo
- Pastor de Castro
- Albert Bañez.

Former Rep. Roxas' namesake, independent candidate Joselito "Lito" Roxas, who also bear the same name of his in the ballot, also ran.

Vice Mayor Marlon Pesebre was on his second term, and he ran for third term under the United Nationalist Alliance. His opponent was Pasay's BPLO Sec. Noel "Boyet" Del Rosario.

Rep. Imelda "Emi" Calixto-Rubiano was on her second term, and she ran for re-election for third term under the Liberal Party. Her opponents were:

- Atty. Santiago "Sonny" Quial of the Nationalist People's Coalition, Former Acting City Administrator
- Atty. Jose Allan "Bong" Tebelin, independent candidate
- Deo Laguipo, independent candidate

The major coalition was Team Dr. Roxas, a major opposition team, which is composed of Nationalist People's Coalition, United Nationalist Alliance, Partido Demokratikong Pilipino-Lakas ng Bayan, Pwersa ng Masang Pilipino and Akbayan. Team Calixto is the administration coalition of Pasay under Liberal Party.

== Candidates ==
=== Administration's Ticket ===
==== Team Calixto ====
Liberal Party/Team Calixto
Name	Party
For House Of Representative
Emi Calixto-Rubiano	Liberal
For Mayor
Tony Calixto	Liberal
For Vice Mayor
Boyet Del Rosario	Liberal
For Councilor (1st District)
Jerome Advincula	Liberal
Abet Alvina	Liberal
Mark Calixto	Liberal
Tonya Cuneta	Liberal
Margie Molina	Liberal
Ding Santos	Liberal
For Councilor (2nd District)
Moti Arceo	Liberal
Joey Calixto Isidro	Liberal
Wowee Manguerra	Liberal
Aileen Padua	Liberal
Rey Padua Jr.	Liberal
Donna Vendivel	Liberal

=== Opposition's Ticket ===
==== Team Roxas ====
United Nationalist Alliance/Team Reporma/Team Roxas/United Opposition
Name	Party
For House Of Representatives
Atty. Sonny Quial	Independent
For Mayor
Dr. Lito Roxas	UNA
For Vice Mayor
Marlon Pesebre	NPC
For Councilor (1st District)
Pat Ibay	Akbayan
Ariel Pesebre	NPC
Bing Petallo	UNA
Jenny Roxas	UNA
Tino Santos	NPC
Nelfa Trinidad	UNA
For Councilor (2nd District)
Ileana Ibay	Akbayan
Allan Panaligan	PMP
Bong Tolentino	PDP–Laban
Guest Candidates
Jimboy Baliad	Independent
Onie Bayona	UNA
Ramon Yabut	PRP

==== Team Pag-asa ====
Partido Demokratiko Pilipino-Lakas ng Bayan/Team Pag-asa/Team Jorge del Rosario
Name	Party
For House Of Representatives
Jose Bong Tebelin	Independent
For Mayor
Jorge Del Rosario	PDP–Laban
For Councilor (1st District)
Lolita Miranda	PDP–Laban
For Councilor (2nd District)
Christopher Tan	PDP–Laban
Ramon Yabut	PRP

== Results ==
Names written in bold-Italic are the re-elected incumbents while in italic are incumbents lost in elections.

=== For Representative ===
Rep. Imelda Calixto-Rubiano defeated former Acting City Administrator Santiago "Sonny" Quial, Jose Allan "Bong" Tebelin, and Deo Laguipo.

Congressional Elections in Pasay's Lone District
Party	Candidate	Votes	%
**Liberal**	**Imelda Calixto-Rubiano**	**140,774**	**80.52**
Independent	Santiago "Sonny" Quial	30,890	17.66
Independent	Jose Allan “Bong” Tebelin	1,929	1.10
Independent	Deo Laguipo	1,265	0.72
Total votes		**174,828**	**100.00**
**Margin of victory**		109,884	15.62
Liberal **hold**			

Popular vote percentage
**Calixto-Rubiano**	80.52%
Quial	17.66%
Tebelin	1.10%
Laguipo	0.72%

=== For Mayor ===
Mayor Antonino "Tony" Calixto defeated his closest rival former Rep. Jose Antonio “Lito” Roxas.

Pasay Mayoral Elections
Party	Candidate	Votes	%
**Liberal**	**Antonino "Tony" Calixto**	**113,751**	**62.28**
UNA	Jose Antonio “Lito” Roxas	42,694	23.38
Independent	Joselito "Lito" Roxas	13,526	7.41
PDP–Laban	Jorge del Rosario	10,580	5.79
Independent	Pastor "Daddy Jo" de Castro Jr.	943	0.52
Independent	Albert Bañez	756	0.41
Independent	Romulo “Rome” Marcelo Sr.	381	0.21
Total votes		**182,631**	**100.00**
**Margin of victory**		71,057	22.02
Liberal **hold**			

Popular vote percentage
**Calixto**	62.28%
Roxas	23.38%
Roxas	7.41%
Del Rosario	5.79%
De Castro	0.52%
Bañez	0.41%
Marcelo	0.21%

=== For Vice Mayor ===
Vice Mayor Marlon Pesebre was defeated by BPLO Sec. Noel "Boyet" Del Rosario.

Pasay Vice Mayoral Elections
Party	Candidate	Votes	%
**Liberal**	**Noel "Boyet" Del Rosario**	**94,829**	**53.69**
NPC	Marlon Pesebre	81,799	46.31
Total votes		**176,628**	**100.00**
**Margin of victory**		13,030	46.31
Liberal **hold**			

Popular vote percentage
**Del Rosario**	53.69%
Pesebre	46.31%

=== For Councilors ===
==== First District ====
Only Alberto "Abet" Alvina was re-elected incumbent. Newly elected and returning councilors were:

- NEWLY ELECTED: Mark Anthony Calixto, son of Mayor Antonino "Tony" Calixto.
- NEWLY ELECTED: Jerome Advincula, son of term-limited Councilor Richard Advincula, replaced his father.
- RETURNING: Former Liga ng Barangay President and former Councilor Ma. Antonia Cuneta, daughter-in-law of former Mayor Pablo Cuneta and wife of former Liga ng Barangay President Generoso Cuneta.
- NEWLY ELECTED: Ricardo "Ding" Santos, who was a former mayoral and vice mayoral candidate in several previous elections and the former security aide of former Mayor Pablo Cuneta, was elected as one of the newly posted councilor of the district.
- NEWLY ELECTED: Consertino "Tino" Santos replaced his wife, term-limited Councilor Mary Grace Santos.

Losing incumbents and former councilors were:

- **INCUMBENT** Councilor Jennifer "Jenny" Roxas, wife of mayoral candidate and former Rep. Jose Antonio "Lito" Roxas, **7th**.
- **FORMER** Councilor Ma. Luisa "Bing" Petallo, **13th**.

Nelfa Delfin-Trinidad, former City First Lady and wife of the late former Mayor Wenceslao "Peewee" Trinidad, 12th.

City Council Elections in Pasay's First District
Party	Candidate	Votes	%
**Liberal**	**Mark Anthony Calixto**	**51,369**	
**Liberal**	**Jerome Advincula**	**45,986**	
**Liberal**	**Ma. Antonia "Tonya" Cuneta**	**41,835**	
**Liberal**	**Alberto "Abet" Alvina**	**36,994**	
**Liberal**	**Ricardo "Ding" Santos**	**35,796**	
**NPC**	**Consertino "Tino" Santos**	**34,291**	
UNA	Jennifer Roxas	33,798	
NPC	Ariel Pesebre	32,409	
Independent	Ron Jay Advincula	29,946	
Akbayan	Pat Ibay	27,066	
Liberal	Margarita "Margie" Molina	26,068	
UNA	Nelfa Trinidad	20,340	
UNA	Maria Luisa "Bing" Petallo	13,789	
PDP–Laban	Lolita Miranda	10,233	
Independent	Eleazar "Boyet" Garpa	8,473	
Independent	Jon Bautista	6,441	
KBL	Alex Canon	1,969	
Independent	Oscar Ng	1,689	
Independent	Joe Sato	1,484	
Total votes			

==== Second District ====
Three of the six incumbents were re-elected:

- Arnel "Moti" Arceo
- Allan Panaligan
- Aileen Padua-Lopez

Other incumbents were:

- LOST: Arvin "Bong" Tolentino ran and lost, placing **7th**.
- TERM-LIMITED: Ian Vendivel, replaced by his wife, Donnabel.
- TERM-LIMITED: Reynaldo "Rey" Padua Sr.,replaced by Reynaldo Jr. but lost, placing **8th**.

Newly elected councilors were:

- Donnabel Vendivel, who replaced his husband Ian Vendivel who was term-limited.
- businesswoman Edith "Wowee" Manguerra, owner of Wowee Market along Taft Avenue.
- Jose "Joey" Isidro Jr. Isidro, nephew of siblings Rep.Emi" Calixto-Rubiano and Mayor Antonino "Tony" Calixto.

Former Councilors Ileana Ibay and Noel "Onie" Bayona failed to seek city council comeback, placing 10th and 9th, respectively.

City Council Elections in Pasay's Second District
Party	Candidate	Votes	%
**Liberal**	**Arnel Regino "Moti" Arceo**	**50,866**	
**PMP**	**Allan Panaligan**	**46,893**	
**Liberal**	**Edith "Wowee" Manguerra**	**46,459**	
**Liberal**	**Jose "Joey" Isidro Jr.**	**42,579**	
**Liberal**	**Donnabel Vendivel**	**41,790**	
**Liberal**	**Aileen Padua-Lopez**	**39,693**	
PDP–Laban	Arvin "Bong" Tolentino	38,847	
Liberal	Reynaldo Padua Jr.	31,163	
UNA	Noel "Onie" Bayona	29,928	
Akbayan	Ileana Ibay	27,053	
Independent	Jimboy Baliad	24,097	
Independent	Danilo "Danny" Cuneta	14,354	
Independent	Col. Reynaldo "Rey" Ulic	9,908	
Independent	Edgar "Eddie" Monton	4,319	
KBL	Reynold "RC" Campo	3,894	
Independent	Ricardo "Ric" Suva Jr.	2,994	
Independent	Rolando "Rolly" Bacar	2,941	
Independent	Dedick "Dicky" Enriquez	2,145	
Independent	Weng Estrella	2,123	
PRP	Ramon Yabut	2,045	
PDP–Laban	Christopher Tan	1,903	
Independent	Rafael Marcelo	1,626	
Total votes			
