= 2013 Pasay local elections =

18th City elections in Pasay

2013 Pasay Mayoral election
- May 13, 2013
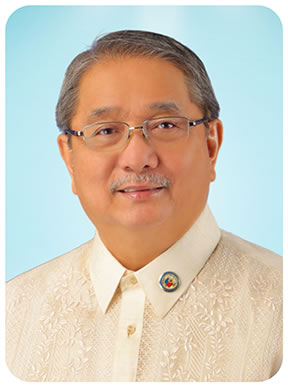
Nominee	Antonino "Tony" Calixto	Jorge Del Rosario	Wenceslao "Peewee" Trinidad
Party	Liberal	NPC	Nacionalista
Running mate	Noel "Onie" Bayona	Joven "Jojie" Claudio
Popular vote	100,715	24,380	18,797
Percentage	69.56	16.84	12.98
Mayor before election
Antonino "Tony" Calixto
Liberal
Elected mayor
Antonino "Tony" Calixto
Liberal
- Vice mayoral election
Candidate	Marlon Pesebre	Noel "Onie" Bayona	Ricardo "Ding" Santos
Party	UNA	Liberal	LDP
Alliance	Team Pesebre	Team Calixto	Team Kaibigan
Popular vote	74,828	38,459	21,123
Percentage	53.95%	27.73%	15.23%
Vice Mayor before election
Marlon Pesebre
Liberal
Elected Vice Mayor
Marlon Pesebre
Liberal

Local elections were held in Pasay City on May 13, 2013 as part of the general elections. The voters elected one mayor, one vice-mayor, one congressional representative, and twelve councilors, six per district.

== Background ==
Mayor Antonino "Tony" Calixto was on his first term, and he ran for re-election for second term. He was challenged by Former Mayor Wenceslao "Peewee" Trinidad, businessman Jorge Del Rosario, and perennial candidate Romulo "Rome" Marcelo.

Vice Mayor Marlon Pesebre was on his first term, and he ran for re-election for second term. He was challenged by Former Second District Councilor and defeated 2010 vice mayoral candidate Noel "Onie" Bayona, defeated 2010 mayoral candidate Ricardo "Ding" Santos, and Former Acting Second District Councilor Joven "Jojie" Claudio, son of former Mayor Jovito Claudio.

Rep. Imelda "EmI" Calixto-Rubiano was on her first term, and she ran for re-election for second term. She was challenged by Former Acting City Administrator Santiago "Sonny" Quial and Pastor De Castro Jr.

== Candidates ==
=== Administration's Ticket ===
==== Team Calixto ====
Liberal Party/Team Calixto
Name	Party
For House Of Representative
Emi Calixto-Rubiano	Liberal
For Mayor
Tony Calixto	Liberal
For Vice Mayor
Onie Bayona	Liberal
For Councilor (1st District)
Ed Advincula	Liberal
Richard Advincula	Liberal
Abet Alvina	Liberal
Pinky Lyn Francisco	Liberal
Lex Ibay	Liberal
Jenny Roxas	Liberal
For Councilor (2nd District)
Moti Arceo	Liberal
Brian Bayona	Liberal
Ileana Ibay	Liberal
Rey Padua	Liberal
Ian Vendivel	Liberal
Edith Vergel De Dios	Liberal

=== Opposition Team ===
==== Team Pesebre ====
United Nationalist Alliance/Team Pesebre
Name	Party
For Vice Mayor
Marlon Pesebre	UNA
For Councilor (1st District)
Angelo "Nonoy" Decena	NPC
Boyet Garpa	Independent
Grace Santos	UNA
TJ Trinidad	Independent
For Councilor (2nd District)
Alvin Cruzin	NPC
Cecile Dela Cruz	UNA
Junjun Mitra	NPC
Allan Panaligan	UNA
Bong Tolentino	UNA

==== Team JDL ====
Nationalist People's Coalition/Team JDL
Name	Party
For House Of Representative
Atty. Sonny Quial	NPC
For Mayor
Jorge Del Rosario	NPC
For Vice Mayor
Jojie Claudio	NPC
For Councilor (1st District)
Carding Corral	NPC
Angelo "Nonoy" Decena	NPC
Nonoy Hilvano	NPC
Margie Molina	NPC
Roger Peyuan	NPC
Bong Tebelin	NPC
For Councilor (2nd District)
Rc Boy Campo	NPC
Alvin Cruzin	NPC
Edgar Louie Eusebio	NPC
Junjun Mitra	NPC
Janet Protacio-Cortes	NPC

==== Team Peewee ====
Nacionalista Party/Team Peewee
Name	Party
For Mayor
Peewee Trinidad	Nacionalista
For Councilor (1st District)
Greg Alcera	Independent
Charlie Chavez	Nacionalista
Nelfa Trinidad	Nacionalista
For Councilor (2nd District)
Alex Acabado	Nacionalista
Reggie Lim	Nacionalista
Olo Tianzon	Nacionalista

==== Team Kaibigan ====
Laban ng Demokratikong Pilipino/Team Kaibigan
Name	Party
For Vice Mayor
Ricardo "Ding" Santos	LDP
For Councilor (1st District)
Lolita Miranda	Independent
Bing Petallo	Independent
For Councilor (2nd District)
Elaine Abiera	Independent
Norton Elipio	Independent
Pam Paredes	Independent

== Results ==
Names written in bold-Italic are the re-elected incumbents while in italic are incumbents lost in elections.

=== For Representative ===
Rep. Imelda Calixto-Rubiano defeated former Acting City Administrator Santiago "Sonny" Quial.

Congressional Elections in Pasay's Lone District
Party	Candidate	Votes	%
**Liberal**	**Imelda "Emi" Calixto-Rubiano**	**110,144**	**81.97**
NPC	Santiago "Sonny" Quial	20,457	15.22
Independent	Pastor De Castro Jr.	3,771	2.81
Total votes		**134,372**	**100.00**
Liberal **hold**			

Popular vote percentage
**Calixto-Rubiano**	81.97%
Santiago	15.22%
Quial	2.81%

=== For Mayor ===
Mayor Antonino Calixto defeated businessman Jorge del Rosario and former Mayor Wenceslao "Peewee" Trinidad.

Pasay Mayoralty Election
Party	Candidate	Votes	%
**Liberal**	**Antonino "Tony" Calixto**	**100,715**	**69.56**
NPC	Jorge del Rosario	24,380	16.84
Nacionalista	Wenceslao "Peewee" Trinidad	18,797	12.98
Independent	Romulo “Rome” Marcelo Sr.	900	0.62
Total votes		**144,792**	**100.00**
Liberal **hold**			

Popular vote percentage
**Calixto**	69.56%
Del Rosario	16.84%
Trinidad	12.98%
Marcelo	0.62%

=== For Vice Mayor ===
Vice Mayor Marlon Pesebre defeated former Second District Councilor Noel "Onie" Bayona and retired Police Ricardo "Ding" Santos.

Pasay Vice Mayoralty Elections
Party	Candidate	Votes	%
**UNA**	**Marlon Pesebre**	**74,828**	**53.95**
Liberal	Noel "Onie" Bayona	38,459	27.73
LDP	Ricardo "Ding" Santos	21,123	15.23
NPC	Joven "Jojie" Claudio	4,286	3.09
Total votes		**138,696**	**100.00**
UNA **hold**			

Popular vote percentage
**Pesebre**	53.95%
Bayona	27.73%
Santos	15.23%
Claudio	3.09%

=== For Councilors ===
==== First District ====
Five of the six re-elected incumbents were:

- Mary Grace Santos
- Richard Advincula
- Alberto "Abet" Alvina
- Eduardo "Ed" Advincula
- Lexter "Lex" Ibay

Pinky Lyn Francisco ran for re-election but lost, placing 7th.

The newly-elected councilor was Jennifer "Jenny" Roxas, wife of former Rep. Jose Antonio "Lito" Roxas. She ended 2nd.

Former Councilors Uldarico "Ric" Arabia, Gregorio "Greg" Alcera, and Ma. Luisa "Bing" Petallo failed to return city council. Arabia was 19th, Alcera was 9th, and Petallo was 14th.

Nelfa Delfin-Trinidad, former City First Lady and wife of former Mayor Wenceslao "Peewee" Trinidad lost, placing 10th.

Actor TJ Trinidad (not related to former Mayor Peewee) ran and lost too, placing 8th.

City Council Elections in Pasay's First District
Party	Candidate	Votes	%
**UNA**	**Mary Grace Santos**	**42,530**	
**Liberal**	**Jennifer "Jenny" Roxas**	**38,521**	
**Liberal**	**Richard Advincula**	**32,017**	
**Liberal**	**Alberto "Abet" Alvina**	**31,234**	
**Liberal**	**Eduardo "Ed" Advincula**	**28,443**	
**Liberal**	**Lexter "Lex" Ibay**	**27,329**	
Liberal	Pinky Lyn Francisco	25,608	
Independent	TJ Trinidad	24,973	
Independent	Gregorio "Greg" Alcera	18,555	
Nacionalista	Nelfa Delfin-Trinidad	15,462	
NPC	Angelo Decena	11,977	
Nacionalista	Charlie Chavez	11,129	
NPC	Margie Molina	10,976	
Independent	Maria Luisa "Bing" Petallo	10,865	
Independent	Eleazar "Boyet" Garpa	7,086	
NPC	Carding Corral	6,318	
Independent	Patrick Cuneta	4,453	
Independent	Lolita Miranda	3,691	
Independent	Uldarico "Ric" Arabia	3,393	
NPC	Celestino Hilvano	2,347	
NPC	Jose Allan "Bong" Tebelin	2,047	
NPC	Roger Peyuan	1,052	
Independent	Reynaldo Cuardo	958	
Independent	Rafael Velez	598	
Total votes		**373,030**	

==== Second District ====
Three out of six re-elected incumbents were:

- Ian Vendivel
- Arvin "Bong" Tolentino
- Reynaldo "Rey" Padua Sr.

Three other incumbents who ran for re-election but lost were:

- Edita "Edith" Vergel de Dios, **8th**.
- Ileana Ibay, **9th**.
- Brian Bayona, **10th**.

Newly-elected councilors were:

- Former Acting Mayor Allan Panaligan, who ran in 2007 and 2010 elections but lost.
- Aileen Padua-Lopez, daughter of Reynaldo "Rey" Padua Sr.
- Arnel Regino "Moti" Arceo, who ran last elections as vice mayor but lost to Pesebre.

City Council Elections in Pasay's Second District
Party	Candidate	Votes	%
**UNA**	**Allan Panaligan**	**33,563**	
**Independent**	**Aileen Padua-Lopez**	**30,746**	
**Liberal**	**Ian Vendivel**	**30,721**	
**UNA**	**Arvin "Bong" Tolentino**	**30,257**	
**Liberal**	**Arnel Regino "Moti" Arceo**	**30,255**	
**Liberal**	**Reynaldo "Rey" Padua**	**28,019**	
NPC	Elmer "Junjun" Mitra Jr.	25,888	
Liberal	Edita "Edith" Vergel De Dios	25,426	
Liberal	Ileana Ibay	25,313	
Liberal	Brian Bayona	21,567	
NPC	Alvin Cruzin	10,641	
Nacionalista	Alex Acabado	9,528	
Nacionalista	Reggie Lim	8,393	
Independent	Pam Paredes	7,808	
Nacionalista	Olo Tianzon	6,731	
UNA	Cecille Dela Cruz	5,618	
Independent	Elaine Abiera	5,220	
NPC	Janet Protacio	4,782	
Independent	Norton Elipio	4,293	
NPC	Reynold "RC Boy" Campo	3,188	
NPC	Edgar Louie Eusebio	3,165	
Independent	Allan Ko	3,156	
Independent	Edgar Monton	3,038	
PDP–Laban	Pedro "Pete" Ordiales	1,498	
Independent	Dedick Enriquez	1,179	
Independent	Crisber Collantes	789	
Total votes		**329,776**	
