= 1992 Pasay local elections =

10th City elections in Pasay

1992 Pasay mayoral election
- May 11, 1992
Nominee	Pablo Cuneta	Rolando Briones	Eduardo Calixto
Party	Independent	Liberal	LDP
Running mate	Wenceslao Trinidad	Pedro Tianzon (PDP–Laban)	Popoy Monsod
Popular vote	71,035	42,876	21,545
Percentage	49.84	30.08	15.12
Mayor before election
Pablo Cuneta
Independent
Elected mayor
Pablo Cuneta
Independent

Local elections were held in Pasay on May 11, 1992 within the Philippine general election. The voters elected for the elective local posts in the city: the mayor, vice mayor, the representative for the lone district, and the councilors, twelve of them in the lone district of the city.

== Background ==
Mayor Pablo Cuneta ran for re-election. He was challenged by Rolando Briones and again by former Vice Mayor Eduardo "Duay" Calixto.

Vice Mayor Ibarra Cruz ran for re-election. He was challenged by former Vice Mayor Wenceslao "Peewee" Trinidad.

Representative Lorna Verano-Yap did not run for re-election. Running in her place was former Mayor Jovito Claudio and Edgardo Cuneta, son of Mayor Pablo Cuneta.

== Candidates ==
Independent/Team Cuneta-Trinidad
Name	Party	Result
For House of Representative
Arding Cuneta	Independent	Lost
For Mayor
Pablo Cuneta	Independent	Won
For Vice Mayor
Wenceslao Trinidad	Independent	Won
For Councilor
Greg Alcera	Independent	Won
Ric Arabia	Independent	Won
Moti Arceo	Independent	Won
Tina Bernabe	Independent	Won
Romy Cabrera	Independent	Won
Justo Justo	Independent	Won
Ting Lovina	Independent	Won
Encio Mateo	Independent	Won
Tony Protacio	Independent	Won
Ben Reyes	Independent	Won

Liberal Party/PDP–Laban/Team Briones-Tianzon
Name	Party	Result
For House of Representative
Cesar Santiago	LP–PDP	Lost
For Mayor
Rolando Briones	Liberal	Lost
For Vice Mayor
Pete Tianzon	PDP–Laban	Lost
For Councilor
Gener Cabrido	PDP–Laban	Lost
Jun Elwick	LP–PDP	Lost
Gerry Garcia	PDP–Laban	Lost
Sarge Gobaton	PDP–Laban	Lost
Doc Ignacio	LP–PDP	Lost
Pepe Lapira	Liberal	Lost
Jorge Llamas	LP–PDP	Lost
Pete Ordiales	PDP–Laban	Lost
Allan Panaligan	Liberal	Lost
Tony Ramirez	LP–PDP	Lost
Tony San Juan	Liberal	Lost
Nards Solidum	PDP–Laban	Lost
Edita Vergel De Dios	LP–PDP	Won

Laban ng Demokratikong Pilipino/Team Calixto-Monsod-Claudio
Name	Party	Result
For House of Representative
Jovito Claudio	LDP	Won
For Mayor
Eduardo Calixto	LDP	Lost
For Vice Mayor
Popoy Monsod	LDP	Lost
For Councilor
Obet Alvarez	LDP	Won
Jovy Angel	LDP	Lost
Nanding Baet	LDP	Lost
Lito Jaune	LDP	Lost
Fred Canita	LDP	Lost
Bert Capili	LDP	Lost
Jack Fernando	LDP	Lost
Oca Linao	LDP	Lost
Teddy Lorca	Independent	Lost
Albert Paredes	LDP	Lost
Nick Teodoro	LDP	Lost
Ernie Ungria	LDP	Lost

== Results ==
=== For Representative ===
Incumbent Lorna Verano Yap of Koalisyong Pambansa ran for the Senate. Koalisyong Pambansa nominated Cesar Santiago, who was defeated by Jovito Claudio of Laban ng Demokratikong Pilipino.

Candidate	Party	Votes	%
Jovito Claudio	Laban ng Demokratikong Pilipino	51,802	40.59
Edgardo Cuneta	Independent	43,093	33.77
Cesar Santiago	Koalisyong Pambansa	20,968	16.43
Jose Comendador	Independent	5,321	4.17
Panfillo Villaruel	Partido Demokratiko Sosyalista ng Pilipinas	4,028	3.16
Reynaldo Cuyugan	People's Reform Party	1,476	1.16
Armando San Juan	PB/Lakas–NUCD	698	0.55
Francisco Peñaflor-Noel	Independent	191	0.15
David Reyes	Independent	43	0.03
Pacifico Rosal	Independent	5	0.00
Total		127,625	100.00
Source: Commission on Elections

=== For Mayor ===
Mayor Pablo Cuneta defeated Rolando Briones, former OIC-Mayor Eduardo Calixto, former OIC-mayor Norma Urbina and two other candidates in the mayoral race.

1992 Pasay Mayoral election
Candidate	Party	Votes	%
Pablo Cuneta (incumbent)	Independent	71,035	49.84
Rolando Briones	Liberal Party	42,876	30.08
Eduardo Calixto	Laban ng Demokratikong Pilipino	21,545	15.12
Norma Urbina	Lakas–NUCD	6,305	4.42
Florentino Pagaspas	Nacionalista Party	558	0.39
George Ariel Cuenca	People's Reform Party	200	0.14
Total		142,519	100.00

=== For Vice Mayor ===
Former Councilor and defeated 1988 mayoral candidate Wenceslao "Peewee" Trinidad won against Vice Mayor Ibarra Cruz and eight other candidates.

1992 Pasay Vice Mayoral election
Candidate	Party	Votes	%
Wenceslao Trinidad	Independent	43,600	31.13
Ibarra Cruz	Independent	37,726	26.94
Pedro Tianzon	PDP–Laban	27,235	19.45
Melchor Monsod	Laban ng Demokratikong Pilipino	19,072	13.62
Eduardo Advincula I	Nacionalista Party	6,820	4.87
Jesus Jose Cosico	Lakas–NUCD	2,374	1.70
Antonio Diaz	Kilusang Bagong Lipunan	1,549	1.11
Romulo Marcelo Sr.	Independent	1,039	0.74
Nonito Raymundo Flores	People's Reform Party	424	0.30
Efren Dominguez	Partido ng Masang Pilipino	204	0.15
Total		140,043	100.00

=== For Councilors ===
Member, City Council of Pasay's Lone District
Party	Candidate	Votes	%
Independent	Ernestina "Tina" Bernabe	81,717	
Independent	Arnel Regino "Moti" Arceo	80,920	
Independent	Gregorio "Greg" Alcera	61,607	
Independent	Romulo "Romy" Cabrera	54,722	
Independent	Justo Justo	51,826	
Independent	Florencio "Encio" Mateo	49,271	
Independent	Benjamin Reyes	42,804	
Independent	Antonio "Tony" Protacio	42,156	
LP–PDP	Edita "Edith" Vergel de Dios	40,234	
Independent	Primitivo Lovina	39,952	
Independent	Uldarico "Ric" Arabia	30,530	
LDP	Roberto "Obet" Alvarez	34,352	
Total votes			
