= 2019 Pasay local elections =

20th City elections in Pasay

2019 Pasay mayoral elections
- May 13, 2019
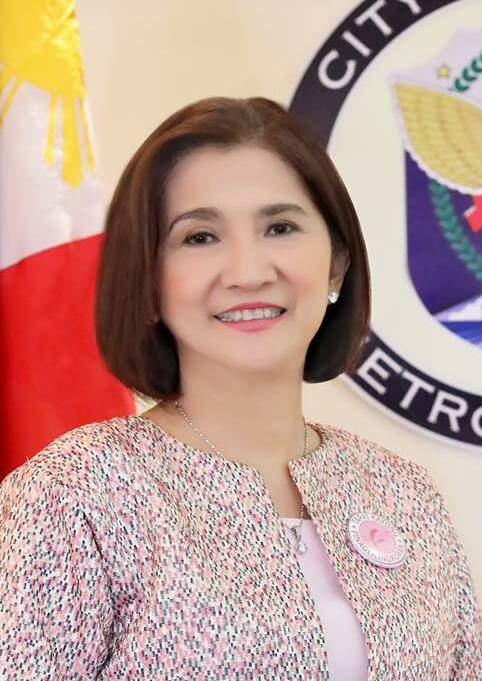
Nominee	Imelda Calixto-Rubiano	Cesar Joseph "Chet" Cuneta	Edward "ET" Togonon
Party	PDP–Laban	NPC	Independent
Running mate	Noel "Boyet" Del Rosario	Richard Advincula	Jose Allan "Bong" Tebelin
Popular vote	121,391	35,784	25,446
Percentage	63.89	18.83	13.39
Mayor before election
Antonino Calixto
PDP–Laban
Elected mayor
Imelda Calixto-Rubiano
PDP–Laban

Local elections were held in Pasay on May 13, 2019 within the Philippine general election. The voters elected for the elective local posts in the city: the mayor, vice mayor, the congressman, and the councilors, six of them in the two districts of the city.

== Background ==
Mayor Antonino "Tony" Calixto was on third and final term and he was term-limited. He ran as representative instead. Her sister Rep. Imelda "Emi" Calixto-Rubiano, ran for his place. Her opponent were:

- Cesar Joseph "Chet" Cuneta, son of former Mayor Pablo Cuneta and older brother of actress and singer Sharon Cuneta.
- Fiscal Edward "ET" Togonon, who served as Chief Prosecutor of Pasay, Muntinlupa and Manila for 32 years.
- Atty. Cherry Christine “Tin” Ching
- Former SK Federation President Jon Wilfred “JT” Trinidad, son of the late former Mayor Atty. Wenceslao "Peewee" Trinidad.

Vice Mayor Noel “Boyet” Del Rosario was on his first term, and he ran for re-election for second term. His opponents were:

- Former First District Councilor Richard M. Advincula
- Atty. Jose Allan "Bong" M. Tebelin
- Armando Magbanua.

Rep. Imelda Calixto-Rubiano was on her third and term, and she was term-limited. She ran as mayor instead. His brother, Mayor Antonino "Tony" Calixto ran for her place. His opponents were:

- Atty. Elmer Mitra
- businessman Efren "Choy" Alas
- Metel Gelbolingo
- Pedro "Pete" Ordiales.

== Candidates ==
=== Team Calixto ===
PDP-Laban
Name	Party
For House Of Representative
Tony Calixto	PDP–Laban
For Mayor
Emi Calixto-Rubiano	PDP–Laban
For Vice Mayor
Boyet Del Rosario	PDP–Laban
For Councilor (1st District)
Ambet Alvina	PDP–Laban
Mark Calixto	PDP–Laban
Tonya Cuneta	PDP–Laban
Johnny Santiago	PDP–Laban
Ding Santos	PDP–Laban
Grace Santos	PDP–Laban
For Councilor (2nd District)
Moti Arceo	PDP–Laban
Joey Calixto Isidro	PDP–Laban
Edith Wowee Manguerra	PDP–Laban
Aileen Padua	PDP–Laban
Allan Panaligan	PDP–Laban
Donna Vendivel	PDP–Laban

=== Chetsharon Warriors ===
Nationalist People's Coalition
Name	Party
For House Of Representative
Efren "Choy" Alas	NPC
For Mayor
Cesar Joseph "Chet" Cuneta	NPC
For Vice Mayor
Richard Advincula	NPC
For Councilor (1st District)
Jerome Advincula	NPC
Kap Ronjay Advincula	NPC
Rlbaste Bayona	NPC
Bossing Morallos	NPC
Boni Santillana	NPC
Miki Trinidad	NPC
For Councilor (2nd District)
Botchok Batobato	NPC
Ferdie Espiritu	NPC
Armando Lee	NPC
Khen Magat	NPC
Itoy Restrivera	NPC
Roland Sanchez	NPC

=== Team Togonon ===
Partido Federal ng Pilipinas
Name	Party
For House Of Representative
Elmer Mitra	Independent
For Mayor
Edward Togonon	Independent
For Vice Mayor
Jose Tebelin	Independent
For Councilor (1st District)
Jao Bajao	Independent
Wennie Elento	Independent
Alejandro Evardone Jr.	Independent
Michael Tiger Gabriel	PFP
Atty. Sonny Quial	Independent
For Councilor (2nd District)
Onie Bayona	Independent
Hector Bongat	Independent
Arnel Cabrido	Independent
Ramon Yabut	PFP

=== Team Ching (PDDS) ===
Pederalismo ng Dugong Dakilang Samahan
Name	Party
For House Of Representative
Metel Gelbolingo	PDDS
For Mayor
Tin Ching	PDDS
For Vice Mayor
Armando Magbanua	PDDS
For Councilor (1st District)
John Manuel Bautista	PDDS
Romeo Dela Merced	PDDS
Ariel Richard Gomez	PDDS
Jonathan Maneja	PDDS
For Councilor (2nd District)
Tine Barrios	PDDS
Albert Carasig	PDDS
Joseph Chua	PDDS
Buboy Dalucapas Jr.	PDDS
Vic Gine	PDDS
Bong Malonzo	PDDS

=== Others ===
Pwersa ng Masang Pilipino (1st District)
Name	Party
Lex Ibay	PMP
Marlon Pesebre	Independent

Independent (1st District)
Name	Party
Ramon Sta. Maria	Independent

== Results ==
Names written in bold-Italic are the re-elected incumbents while in italic are incumbents lost in elections.

=== For Representative, Lone District of Pasay ===
Mayor Antonino "Tony" Calixto defeated Efren "Choy" Alas, Atty. Elmer Mitra, Metel Gelbolingo, and Pedro "Pete" Ordiales.

Congressional Elections in Pasay's Lone District
Party	Candidate	Votes	%
**PDP–Laban**	**Antonino "Tony" Calixto**	**136,519**	**76.50%**
NPC	Efren “Choy” Alas	22,372	12.60%
Independent	Elmer Mitra	12,662	7.10%
PDDS	Metel Gelbolingo	3,980	2.20%
Independent	Pedro “Pete” Ordiales	2,850	1.60%
Total votes		**178,383**	**100.00%**
**Margin of victory**		41,864	23.50
PDP–Laban **hold**			

Popular vote percentage
**Calixto**	76.50%
Alas	12.60%
Mitra	7.10%
Gelbolingo	2.20%
Ordiales	1.60%

=== For Mayor ===
Rep. Imelda "Emi" Calixto-Rubiano defeated her closest rivals Cesar Joseph "Chet" Cuneta and Edward "ET" Togonon.

Pasay Mayoral election
Party	Candidate	Votes	%
**PDP–Laban**	**Imelda “Emi” Calixto-Rubiano**	**121,391**	**63.89%**
NPC	Cesar Joseph “Chet” Cuneta	35,784	18.83%
Independent	Edward “ET” Togonon	25,446	13.39%
PDDS	Cherry Christine “Tin” Ching	5,282	2.78%
Independent	Jon Wilfred “JT” Trinidad	2,104	1.11%
Total votes		**190,007**	**100.00%**
**Margin of victory**		68,616	36.11
PDP–Laban **hold**			

Popular vote percentage
**Calixto-Rubiano**	63.89%
Cuneta	18.83%
Togonon	13.39%
Ching	2.78%
Trinidad	1.11%

=== For Vice Mayor ===
Vice Mayor Noel "Boyet" Del Rosario defeated his closest rival, former Councilor Richard Advincula, and other candidates.

Pasay Vice mayoral election
Party	Candidate	Votes	%
**PDP–Laban**	**Noel "Boyet" Del Rosario**	**116,653**	**65.93%**
NPC	Richard Advincula	49,785	28.14%
Independent	Jose Allan “Bong” Tebelin	5,807	3.28%
PDDS	Armando Magbanua	4,689	2.65%
Total votes		**176,934**	**100.00%**
**Margin of victory**		60,281	34.07
PDP–Laban **hold**			

Popular vote percentage
**Del Rosario**	65.93%
Advincula	28.14%
Tebelin	3.28%
Magbanua	2.65%

=== For Councilors ===
==== First District ====
Three of the six re-elected incumbents were:

- Mark Anthony Calixto
- Ma. Antonia "Tonya" Cuneta
- Ricardo "Ding" Santos

Other incumbents were:

- Consertino "Tino" Santos, replaced by his wife, former Councilor Mary Grace Santos.
- Alberto "Abet" Alvina, term-limited and replaced by his son, Abraham Albert "Abet".
- Jerome Advincula, ran for re-election but lost, placing **7th**.

Former Vice Mayor Marlon Pesebre returned in city council, placing 5th.

Former Councilor Lexter "Lex" Ibay failed to made city council comeback.

City Council Elections in Pasay's First District
Party	Candidate	Votes	%
**PDP–Laban**	**Mark Anthony Calixto**	**57,716**	**12.00%**
**PDP–Laban**	**Mary Grace Santos**	**54,669**	**11.37%**
**PDP–Laban**	**Ma. Antonia "Tonya" Cuneta**	**53,972**	**11.22%**
**PDP–Laban**	**Abraham Albert "Ambet" Alvina**	**49,256**	**10.24%**
**Independent**	**Marlon Pesebre**	**47,949**	**9.97%**
**PDP–Laban**	**Ricardo "Ding" Santos**	**40,105**	**8.34%**
NPC	Jerome Advincula	30,822	6.41%
PDP–Laban	Johnny Santiago	28,471	5.92%
PMP	Lexter "Lex" Ibay	27,177	5.65%
NPC	Ronjay Advincula	23,989	4.99%
Independent	Santiago "Sonny" Quial	12,954	2.69%
NPC	Ralph Lauren "RLBaste" Bayona	8,991	1.87%
PDDS	John Manuel Bautista	8,894	1.85%
NPC	Gregorio "Miki" Trinidad	7,742	1.61%
NPC	Bonifacio "Boni" Santillana	5,147	1.07%
PDDS	Ariel Gomez	4,365	0.91%
NPC	Jovino "Bossing" Morallos	3,854	0.80%
Independent	Jaomar Leslei "Jao" Bajao	2,973	0.62%
Independent	Alejandro Evardone Jr.	2,498	0.52%
Independent	Wennie Elento	2,322	0.48%
PFP	Michael Angelo "Tiger" Gabriel	2,257	0.47%
PDDS	Romeo Dela Merced	1,781	0.37%
Independent	Ramon Sta. Maria	1,615	0.34%
PDDS	Jonathan Maneja	1,495	0.31%
Total votes		**481,014**	**100.00%**

==== Second District ====
All incumbent councilors was re-elected.

Former Councilor Noel "Onie" Bayona failed to return in city council, placing 7th.

City Council Elections in Pasay's Second District
Party	Candidate	Votes	%
**PDP–Laban**	**Allan Panaligan**	**60,605**	**12.74%**
**PDP–Laban**	**Donnabel Vendivel**	**59,307**	**12.47%**
**PDP–Laban**	**Arnel Regino "Moti" Arceo**	**59,227**	**12.45%**
**PDP–Laban**	**Jose "Joey" Isidro Jr.**	**58,654**	**12.33%**
**PDP–Laban**	**Edith "Wowee" Manguerra**	**55,615**	**11.69%**
**PDP–Laban**	**Aileen Padua-La-Torre**	**54,552**	**11.47%**
Independent	Noel "Onie" Bayona	33,042	6.95%
NPC	King Marlon "Khen" Magat	17,972	3.70%
Independent	Hector Bongat	10,840	2.28%
Independent	Arnel Cabrido	10,436	2.19%
NPC	Eduardo "Botchock" Batobato Jr.	9,887	2.08%
NPC	Armando Lee	6,807	1.43%
NPC	Rizalito "Itoy" Restrivera	5,884	1.24%
PDDS	Joseph Chua	5,464	1.15%
PFP	Ramon Gilberto Yabut II	4,933	1.04%
NPC	Rolando Sanchez	4,387	0.92%
NPC	Ferdinand "Ferdie" Espiritu	4,268	0.90%
PDDS	Christine "Tin" Barrios	3,946	0.83%
PDDS	Albert Carasig	3,160	0.66%
PDDS	Michael Joseph "Bong" Malonzo	2,885	0.61%
PDDS	Anselmo "Buboy" Dalucapas Jr.	2,048	0.43%
PDDS	Vicente "Vic" Gine	1,696	0.36%
Total votes		**475,615**	**100.00%**
