= 2025 Pasay local elections =

22nd City elections in Pasay

2025 Pasay mayoral elections
- May 12, 2025
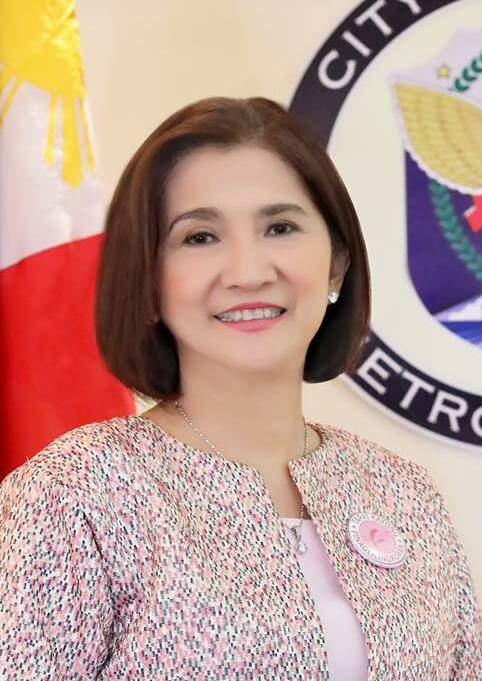

Nominee	Imelda "Emi" Calixto-Rubiano	Editha "Wowee" Manguerra
Party	PFP	Aksyon
Alliance	Team Calixto	Team Manguerra
Running mate	Mark Anthony Calixto	Arvin "Bong" Tolentino
Popular vote	132,928	88,110
Percentage	60.14	39.86
Mayor before election
Imelda Calixto-Rubiano
PDP
Elected mayor
Imelda Calixto-Rubiano
PFP
- Vice mayoral election
Candidate	Mark Anthony Calixto	Arvin "Bong" Tolentino
Party	Lakas	Independent
Alliance	Team Calixto	Team Manguerra
Popular vote	124,002	84,446
Percentage	59.49	40.51
Vice Mayor before election
Waldetrudes "Ding" Del Rosario
Lakas
Elected Vice Mayor
Mark Anthony Calixto
Lakas

Local elections took place in Pasay on May 12, 2025 within the Philippine general election. The voters elected for the elective local posts in the city: the mayor, vice mayor, the congressman, and the councilors, six of them in the two districts of the city.

== Background ==
Mayor Imelda "Emi" Calixto-Rubiano ran for third term. Her running mate was First District Councilor Mark Anthony Calixto, her nephew and son of Rep. Antonino "Tony" Calixto.

Second District Councilor Editha "Wowee" Manguerra was term-limited and ran as mayor. Her running mate was former Second District Councilor Arvin "Bong" Tolentino.

Rep. Antonino "Tony" Calixto ran for third term and challenged by former Second District Councilor Noel "Onie" Bayona.

== Results ==
=== For Mayor ===
Mayor Imelda "Emi" Calixto-Rubiano defeated Councilor Editha "Wowee" Manguerra.

2025 Pasay mayoral election
Candidate	Party	Votes	%
Emi Rubiano (incumbent)	Partido Federal ng Pilipinas	132,928	60.14
Wowee Manguerra	Aksyon Demokratiko	88,110	39.86
Total		221,038	100.00
Valid votes		221,038	96.88
Invalid/blank votes		7,112	3.12
Total votes		228,150	100.00
Registered voters/turnout		292,695	77.95
Partido Federal ng Pilipinas hold			
Source: Commission on Elections

=== For Vice Mayor ===
First District Councilor Mark Anthony Calixto won against former Councilor Bong Tolentino.

2025 Pasay vice mayoral election
Candidate	Party	Votes	%
Mark Calixto	Lakas–CMD	124,002	59.49
Bong Tolentino	Independent	84,446	40.51
Total		208,448	100.00
Valid votes		208,448	91.36
Invalid/blank votes		19,702	8.64
Total votes		228,150	100.00
Registered voters/turnout		292,695	77.95
Lakas–CMD hold			
Source: Commission on Elections

=== For Representative ===
Rep. Antonino "Tony" Calixto was re-elected, defeating former Second District Councilor Noel "Onie" Bayona.

2025 Pasay Lone District Representative election
Candidate	Party	Votes	%
Antonino Calixto (incumbent)	Lakas–CMD	131,640	64.18
Onie Bayona	Aksyon Demokratiko	73,463	35.82
Total		205,103	100.00
Valid votes		205,103	89.90
Invalid/blank votes		23,047	10.10
Total votes		228,150	100.00
Registered voters/turnout		292,695	77.95
Source: Commission on Elections

=== For City Council ===
The Pasay City Council is composed of 14 councilors, 12 of whom are elected.

==== First District ====
Five candidates of Team Calixto won the elections for this district.

2025 City Council election in Pasay's First District
Candidate	Party	Votes	%
Tonyo Cuneta	Lakas–CMD	67,139	12.44
Marlon Pesebre	Lakas–CMD	62,953	11.66
Grace Santos (incumbent)	Lakas–CMD	60,707	11.25
Ding del Rosario	Lakas–CMD	59,441	11.01
Ambet Alvina (incumbent)	Lakas–CMD	56,927	10.55
Jhaz Advincula	Partido Federal ng Pilipinas	47,827	8.86
Tino Claudio Santos	Independent	44,371	8.22
Puchet Santos	Lakas–CMD	37,954	7.03
Ronjay Advincula	Independent	37,509	6.95
Richard Anderson	Independent	29,214	5.41
Tiger Gabriel	Partido Demokratiko Pilipino	14,074	2.61
Jocelyn Sato	Partido Demokratiko Pilipino	10,094	1.87
Ace Calubayan	Independent	6,696	1.24
Ramon Santa Maria	Kilusang Bagong Lipunan	4,856	0.90
Total		539,762	100.00
Total votes		114,755	–
Registered voters/turnout		145,563	78.84
Source: Commission on Elections

==== Second District ====
All six candidates of Team Calixto won the elections for this district.

2025 City Council election in Pasay's Second District
Candidate	Party	Votes	%
Khen Magat (incumbent)	Partido Federal ng Pilipinas	70,796	13.56
Yuyu del Rosario	Tapat Kayong Pinaglilingkuran	65,913	12.62
Allo Arceo (incumbent)	Partido Federal ng Pilipinas	65,084	12.46
Ian Vendivel	Partido Federal ng Pilipinas	63,008	12.07
Allan Panaligan	Partido Federal ng Pilipinas	62,728	12.01
Luigi Rubiano	Tapat Kayong Pinaglilingkuran	60,602	11.60
Jovita Baliao	Partido Demokratiko Pilipino	35,949	6.88
Baby So	Aksyon Demokratiko	35,102	6.72
Ramon Yabut	Liberal Party	19,454	3.73
Hector Bongat	Partido Demokratiko Pilipino	17,856	3.42
Danny Pantia	Independent	11,069	2.12
Manuel Jimenez	Independent	7,701	1.47
Ronelo Caducoy	Independent	6,961	1.33
Total		522,223	100.00
Total votes		113,395	–
Registered voters/turnout		147,132	77.07
Source: Commission on Elections
