= Primitivo Lovina =

Filipino government official

Mayor of Pasay
- In office 1951–1952
- Preceded by: Carlos Rivilla
- Succeeded by: Pablo Cuneta

Secretary of Labor
- In office September 21, 1948 – October 4, 1950
- President: Elpidio Quirino
- Preceded by: Pedro Magsalin
- Succeeded by: Jose Figueras

Primitivo Lovina was a Filipino politician. During the presidency of Elpidio Quirino he was Secretary of Labor; he resigned in 1950. He was appointed mayor of Pasay in 1951, and reappointed in 1952.
