= 2000 Pasay mayoral recall election =

13th City elections in Pasay

- April 15, 2000
Nominee	Wenceslao Trinidad	Ricardo "Ding" Santos	Jovito Claudio
Party	LAMP	PDP–Laban	Lakas
Popular vote	38,550	35,442	13,840
Percentage	43.79	40.26	15.72
Mayor before election
Jovito Claudio
Lakas
Elected mayor
Wenceslao Trinidad
LAMP

A recall election for mayor of Pasay, Metro Manila, Philippines, was held on April 15, 2000, where Mayor Jovito Claudio was defeated by former vice mayor Wenceslao Trinidad.

== Electoral system ==
Recall elections are allowed by Republic Act No. 7160 or the Local Government Code of the Philippines. A recall can be initiated by a petition of at least 25% of the registered voters in the local government unit (LGU) concerned. A resolution from a preparatory recall assembly composed of all of the elected local officials in the LGU concerned is another method of initiating a recall election. An official could be subjected to a recall only once during one's term of office, and from one year after the official took office, up to one year before the next regularly scheduled election. Local elections in the Philippines are held on the second Monday of May every three years starting in 1992, with the elected officials' terms starting on June 30.

City mayors are elected via first-past-the-post voting.

== Background ==
In the May 1998 local elections, Jovito Claudio won the mayoral election, defeating both former vice mayor Wenceslao Trinidad and Ricardo "Ding" Santos, the former security aide of the late former mayor Pablo Cuneta, who retired on that election. Claudio won the election with a margin of 18 votes against Trinidad. A year later, Claudio had a major stroke and required the use of a wheelchair thereafter. Claudio's stroke affected his speech and some motor functions. In May 1999, a preparatory recall assembly chaired by Association of Barangay Captains chief Richard Advincula voted a resolution citing a loss of confidence in Claudio. This led to the Commission on Elections calling a recall election on April 15, 2000. The candidates included Claudio, who was automatically a candidate; Trinidad; Santos; and Romulo Marcelo, a self-proclaimed "candidate of God."

== Campaign ==
Trinidad was supported by vice mayor Greg Alcera, most members of the Pasay City Council, and adherents of the Iglesia ni Cristo. Santos was supported by the barangay captains who formed the preparatory recall assembly against Claudio. Claudio banked on his supporters that made him mayor in 1998, while Marcelo said that God is on his side. The Commission on Elections refused to put the city under its control, with its chairwoman Harriet Demetriou saying that "there is no prevailing peace and order problem."

Claudio sought relief from the Supreme Court to stop the recall election. Two days before the election, the court unanimously dismissed his suit, allowing the recall election to go ahead, citing that Claudio failed to prove that the costs of holding the election would have been taken from President Joseph Estrada's contingency fund, and that he violated the court's rules on omnibus pleadings.

== Results ==
Initial results showed Trinidad and Santos in a tight race, with Claudio a poor third. Trinidad was confident of winning on election day.

2000 Pasay mayoral recall election
Candidate	Party	Votes	%
Wenceslao Trinidad	Lapian ng Masang Pilipino	38,550	43.79
Ricardo Santos	PDP–Laban	35,442	40.26
Jovito Claudio	Lakas–NUCD–UMDP	13,840	15.72
Romulo Marcelo Sr.	Independent	204	0.23
Total		88,036	100.00
Majority		3,108	3.53
Lapian ng Masang Pilipino gain from Lakas–NUCD–UMDP			

Several people were involved in illegal activities on election day. About 25 Santos supporters were briefly detained for campaigning illegally. Two alleged Claudio supporters were arrested for vote buying. The commission received a report of vote padding when 54 people allegedly resided in a four-door apartment. For various bans during the election, 28 were arrested for violating the liquor ban, and six were arrested for violating the gun ban. A thousand policemen kept the peace, with a thousand more on standby. No violent incidents occurred on election day.

The night after the election, Trinidad was proclaimed mayor by the Pasay office of the Commission on Elections. In the canvassing held at the Cuneta Astrodome, Santos refused to concede, while Claudio petitioned the exclusion of election returns, arguing that the recall election is unconstitutional as the election was funded by the president's contingency fund. After the proclamation, Claudio conceded to Trinidad, while the latter offered to help the former in his medical needs.

== Aftermath ==
Trinidad, Santos and vice mayor Alcera contested the mayorship in May 2001. Trinidad defended his mayorship, despite Santos and Alcera saying that he allegedly cheated. Trinidad continued to serve as mayor until 2010. Trinidad died on 2016.

The method of using the preparatory recall assembly to initiate recall petitions was repealed under Republic Act No. 9244 in 2004.
