= Legislative districts of Pasay =

The legislative districts of Pasay are the representations of the highly urbanized city of Pasay in the Congress of the Philippines. The city is currently represented in the lower house of the Congress through its lone congressional district.

== History ==
Pasay was initially represented as part of the at-large district of the province of Manila in the Malolos Congress from 1898 to 1899. The then-town was later incorporated to the province of Rizal, established in 1901, and was represented as part of the first district of Rizal from 1907 to 1941 and from 1945 to 1972. It was incorporated to the City of Greater Manila during World War II and was represented as part of the at-large district of Manila from 1943 to 1944. Pasay was separated from Rizal on November 7, 1975 by virtue of Presidential Decree No. 824, and was represented in the Interim Batasang Pambansa along with other Metropolitan Manila municipalities and cities as part of Region IV from 1978 to 1984.

Pasay first gained separate representation in 1984, when it elected one assemblyman at-large to the Regular Batasang Pambansa from 1984 to 1986. The city continued to constitute a separate congressional district under the new Constitution proclaimed on February 11, 1987; it elected its member to the restored House of Representatives starting that same year.

== Lone District ==
Lakas–CMD (1)

Legislative Districts and Congressional Representatives of Pasay City
District	Current Representative	Barangays	Population (2020)
Lone	Antonino Calixto (since 2019); 21	List: 1-201	440,656
