= Antonino Calixto =

Filipino politician (born 1954)

Antonino G. Calixto
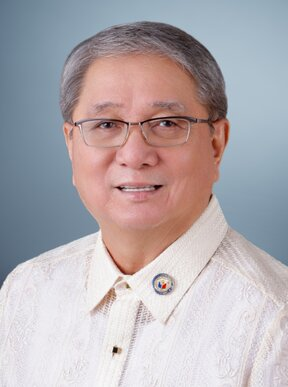
- Official portrait, 2026

Member of the Philippine House of Representatives from Pasay's Lone District
- Incumbent
- Assumed office June 30, 2019
- Preceded by: Imelda Calixto-Rubiano

13th Mayor of Pasay
- In office June 30, 2010 – June 30, 2019
- Vice Mayor: Marlon Pesebre (2010–2016); Noel Del Rosario (2016–2019)
- Preceded by: Wenceslao Trinidad
- Succeeded by: Imelda Calixto-Rubiano

Vice Mayor of Pasay
- In office June 30, 2001 – June 30, 2010; Suspended: September 1, 2006 – February 1, 2007
- Mayor: Wenceslao Trinidad
- Preceded by: Gregorio Alcera
- Succeeded by: Marlon Pesebre

Member of the Pasay City Council from the 1st district
- In office June 30, 1995 – June 30, 2001

Personal details
- Born: Antonino Gallardo Calixto; May 10, 1954 (age 72) Pasay, Rizal, Philippines
- Party: Lakas (2023–present)
- Other political affiliations: PDP–Laban (2016–2023); Liberal (2009–2016); LDP (2000–2009); LAMMP (1997–2000); Independent (1995–1997)
- Spouse: Edna Dayrit Aguas
- Relations: Imelda Calixto-Rubiano (sister)
- Children: 3
- Education: San Sebastian College – Recoletos (BS)
- Profession: Politician

Antonino "Tony" Gallardo Calixto (born May 10, 1954) is a Filipino businessman and politician. He currently serves as a member of the Philippine House of Representatives representing the Lone District of Pasay. He previously served as mayor of Pasay from 2010 until 2019, vice mayor from 2001 to 2010, and councilor from 1995 to 2001.

== Early life and education ==
Antonino Calixto was born on May 10, 1954, in Pasay. He completed his elementary and high school education at Malate Catholic School. He earned his Bachelor of Science degree in Commerce, major in Marketing at San Sebastian College – Recoletos. After completing his undergraduate studies, he took over their family business as its vice president and general manager.

== Political career ==
=== Councilor of Pasay (1995–2001) ===
Calixto was elected as councilor of Pasay from its 1st district in 1995. He was re-elected in 1998. He earned the highest number of votes in both elections.

=== Vice Mayor of Pasay (2001–2010) ===
In 2001, he was elected vice mayor and served for three consecutive terms under former mayor Wenceslao Trinidad, his political ally. He also served in the Pasay Anti-Drug Council, as vice chairman of the Association of Metro Manila Anti-Drug Abuse Council, and as the public relations officer and a member of the board of directors of the Vice Mayors' League of the Philippines, National Capital Region.

On September 1, 2006, Calixto, Trinidad, and 10 other Pasay city officials were suspended for six months by Office of the Ombudsman over the alleged irregularities in garbage collection and disposal contracts entered by the Pasay city government in 2004 and 2005 amounting to ₱464.6 million.

=== Mayor of Pasay (2010–2019) ===
In 2010, Calixto ran for Mayor and won, defeating other prominent candidates including Mayor Wenceslao "Peewee" Trinidad, former Representative Ma. Consuelo "Connie" Dy, and Ricardo "Ding" Santos, former security aide of former Mayor Pablo Cuneta. He was re-elected in 2013 and 2016.

Under Calixto's term, the Pasay local government was awarded first in Government Efficiency by the Department of Trade and Industry in 2018.

=== Representative, Lone District of Pasay (2019–present) ===
In 2019, he was elected representative of Pasay, succeeding his sister Imelda Calixto-Rubiano, who was elected as his successor as mayor. He was re-elected in 2022 and in 2025.

He is one of the 70 lawmakers who voted (representing Malabon Rep. Josephine Lacson-Noel) to reject the franchise renewal of ABS-CBN.

In November 2023, Calixto left PDP-Laban to join the Lakas–CMD party. On February 5, 2025, Calixto was among the 95 Lakas–CMD members who voted to impeach vice president Sara Duterte.

== Personal life ==
Calixto is the son of former Pasay OIC-Mayor Eduardo Calixto and Leonora Gallardo Calixto. He is the older brother of Mayor Imelda Calixto-Rubiano and uncle of former Councilor Jose Isidro Jr. Calixto married Edna Dayrit Aguas, with whom he has three children: Mark Anthony (incumbent vice mayor of Pasay), Derek, and Charlene.

On September 8, 2021, Calixto tested positive for COVID-19.
