= Emi Rubiano =

Filipino politician (born 1960)

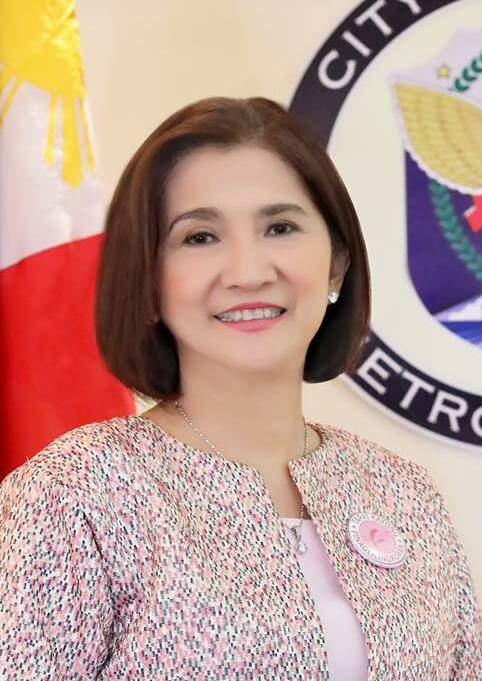

14th Mayor of Pasay
- Incumbent
- Assumed office June 30, 2019
- Vice Mayor: Noel Del Rosario (2019–2022); Waldetrudes del Rosario (2022–2025); Mark Anthony Calixto (2025–present)
- Preceded by: Antonino Calixto

Member of the Philippine House of Representatives from Pasay
- In office June 30, 2010 – June 30, 2019
- Preceded by: Jose Antonio Roxas
- Succeeded by: Antonino Calixto

Member of the Pasay City Council
- In office June 30, 2007 – June 30, 2010
- In office June 30, 1998 – June 30, 2004

Personal details
- Born: Imelda Gallardo Calixto; August 16, 1960 (age 66) Pasay, Rizal, Philippines
- Party: PFP (2023–present)
- Other political affiliations: PDP–Laban (2017–2023); Liberal (2009–2017); LDP (2000–2009); LAMMP (1997–2000)
- Spouse: Edgardo Rubiano (m. 1982)
- Children: 3
- Education: University of Santo Tomas (BA)

Imelda Gallardo Calixto-Rubiano (born August 16, 1960), known as Emi Rubiano, is a Filipino businesswoman and politician currently serving as mayor of Pasay since 2019. She previously served as a member of the House of Representatives for the lone district of Pasay from 2010 until 2019, and city councilor from 1998 until 2004, and again from 2007 until 2010.

Rubiano is the daughter of former OIC-Mayor of Pasay, Eduardo Calixto, sister of former mayor and incumbent congressman Antonino Calixto, mother of Second District Councilor Luigi Rubiano, and aunt of Vice Mayor Mark Anthony Calixto.

== Early life and education ==
Imelda Calixto was born on August 16, 1960, in Pasay City as the youngest of the five children of Eduardo Calixto and Leonora Gallardo Calixto. She was educated at the Malate Catholic School at primary and secondary level and obtained her Bachelor of Arts degree in Behavioral Science at the University of Santo Tomas in 1982. She took up Fashion Designing at the International School of Fashion in Greenhills, San Juan and the Office Procedure Course at the Cora Doloroso Career Centre. After graduation, she got involved in her father's business that was involved in marine engineering, pier construction, marine pipe-laying and marine salvaging. She was involved as well as in her own family business which was manufacturing clothes, multi-level marketing and jewelry.

== Career ==
In 1986, Calixto-Rubiano became a private secretary to her father, Eduardo Calixto, during his term as Officer-in-Charge Mayor of Pasay. She became city councilor for second district of Pasay from 1998 until 2004 and again from 2007 until 2010. During her term as councilor, she made various projects, including feeding programs, free medical and dental check-up, and others.

She also ran for representative for the lone district of Pasay in 2004 under Koalisyon ng Nagkakaisang Pilipino but lost to incumbent representative Connie Dy. After the loss, she became the head of the Pasay City Social Welfare Department in 2005.

=== Congresswoman ===
Rubiano was elected representative for the lone district of Pasay in the House of Representatives, after she defeated incumbent representative Jose Antonio "Lito" Roxas, who sought for his second term, in 2010. She was re-elected in 2013 and in 2016.

=== Mayor of Pasay ===
On May 13, 2019, Rubiano was elected as mayor in the 2019 elections, after she received 125,391 votes. She was sworn in as mayor on June 30, 2019. She is the first female city mayor in the history of Pasay. She led the Pasay City Government especially during the COVID-19 pandemic. She was reelected in 2022 after she received 147,661 votes. Since her second term, she concurrently serves as vice president for the National Capital Region of the League of Cities of the Philippines. She ran for re-election as Pasay mayor in 2025 and later won garnered 132,928 votes.

== Controversies ==
In January 2019, Rubiano, along with four other officials, including her brother, was charged for being related to alleged fiscal anomalies in 2015, 2016, and 2017.

== Personal life ==
She married Edgardo Rubiano on December 18, 1982. They have three children: Nicole, Lesley Anne, and Luigi. Their son Luigi is also in politics, serving as an incumbent Pasay city councilor from the 2nd district since 2025.

Rubiano announced on February 9, 2021, that she tested positive for COVID-19. On January 2, 2022, it was announced that she tested positive for COVID-19 anew; she was an asymptomatic carrier after having a sore throat which she always had.

House of Representatives of the Philippines
Preceded by Jose Antonio Roxas	Member of the Philippine House of Representatives from Pasay's Lone District; 2010–2019	Succeeded by Antonino Calixto
Political offices
Preceded by Antonino Calixto	Mayor of Pasay; 2019–present	Incumbent
