= Connie Dy =

Filipino politician

The Honorable Ma. Consuelo "Connie" Dy

Member of the Philippine House of Representatives from Pasay
- In office June 30, 2001 – June 30, 2007
- Preceded by: Rolando Briones
- Succeeded by: Jose Antonio Roxas

Member of the Pasay City Council from the 2nd district
- In office June 30, 1998 – June 30, 2001

Personal details
- Born: Ma. Consuelo A. Dy; Pasay, Rizal, Philippines
- Political party: PMP (2009–2016); KAMPI (2006–2009); Lakas (2000–2006); Independent (1998–2000)

Maria Consuelo "Connie" A. Dy is a Filipino politician who previously served as the representative of Pasay. She also served as councilor for one term before getting elected as representative. She is the second female representative of the city.

== Background ==
Maria Consuelo "Connie" Dy was born in Pasay.

Dy started her political career when she was elected as councilor in 1998. In 2001, she ran for representative and won. She was re-elected in 2004, defeating then-councilor Imelda Calixto-Rubiano.

In 2007, she ran for Mayor, but lost to Mayor Wenceslao Trinidad. She ran once again for mayor in 2010, but lost to then Vice Mayor Antonino Calixto. She never ran again in any elections since then.
