= Jovito Claudio =

Former Mayor of Pasay

The Honorable Jovito O. Claudio

11th Mayor of Pasay
- In office June 30, 1998 – April 15, 2000
- Vice Mayor: Gregorio "Greg" Alcera
- Preceded by: Pablo Cuneta
- Succeeded by: Wenceslao Trinidad
- In office December 30, 1967 – December 30, 1971
- Preceded by: Pablo Cuneta
- Succeeded by: Pablo Cuneta

Member of the Philippine House of Representatives from Pasay
- In office June 30, 1992 – June 30, 1998
- Preceded by: Lorna Verano-Yap
- Succeeded by: Rolando Briones

Vice Mayor of Pasay
- In office December 30, 1963 – December 30, 1967
- Mayor: Pablo Cuneta
- Preceded by: Ansberto Paredes

Member of the Pasay City Council
- In office 1959–1963

Personal details
- Born: June 15, 1927 Pasay, Rizal, Philippine Islands
- Died: December 16, 2009 (aged 82) Pasay, Metro Manila, Philippines
- Party: Lakas (1995–2000)
- Other political affiliations: LDP (until 1995); Nacionalista (c. 1971)
- Spouse: Norma Santos
- Children: 1
- Education: University of Santo Tomas
- Profession: Physician

Jovito O. Claudio (June 15, 1927 – December 16, 2009) was a Filipino doctor and politician who served as the mayor of Pasay from 1968 to 1971, and again from 1998 to 2000.

== Early life and career ==
Claudio was born in C. Jose Street in Malibay, Pasay on June 15, 1927.

Claudio finished Medicine in University of Santo Tomas in 1954, and finished medical bar examination at the same year.

His political career started in 1959 when he was elected as top councilor. Four years later, he ran a Vice Mayor and won in a landslide victory.

Claudio won the Pasay congressional race in 1992, beating mayor Pablo Cuneta's son Arding. Claudio successfully defended his congressional seat in 1995.

Claudio was elected mayor in 1998. A year later, Claudio suffered a major stroke. He was then involved in a recall election, where he lost to former vice mayor Wenceslao Trinidad.

== Personal life ==
Claudio married Norma Santos and had one son named Joven (acting councilor in 2006–2007, ran as councilor in 2010).

== Death ==
Claudio died due to complications from diabetes.
