= Pasay's at-large congressional district =

Legislative district of the Philippines

- Constituency for the House of Representatives of the Philippines
- Location of Pasay within Metro Manila
- City: Pasay
- Region: Metro Manila
- Population: 440,656 (2020)
- Electorate: 292,695 (2025)
- Area: 13.97 km^{2} (5.39 sq mi)

Current constituency
- Created: 1984
- Representative: Antonino Calixto
- Political party: Lakas
- Congressional bloc: Majority

Pasay's at-large congressional district is the sole congressional district of the Philippines in the city of Pasay. It has been represented in the House of Representatives of the Philippines since 1987 and earlier in the Batasang Pambansa from 1984 to 1986. Pasay first elected a single representative city-wide at-large for the Regular Batasang Pambansa following the 1984 Philippine constitutional plebiscite that amended the 1973 constitution and abolished the regional at-large assembly districts. Before 1973, the city was represented in the national legislatures as part of Rizal's 1st and at-large districts and Manila's at-large district. The district was re-created on February 2, 1987 following the ratification of the 1987 constitution that restored the House of Representatives. It is currently represented in the 20th Congress by Antonino G. Calixto of the Lakas–CMD.

== Representation history ==
| # | Image | Member | Term of office | | Batasang Pambansa | Party | Electoral history |
| # | Image | Member | Start | End | Batasang Pambansa | Party | Electoral history |
|---|---|---|---|---|---|---|---|
=== Pasay's at-large district for the Regular Batasang Pambansa ===
District created February 1, 1984 from Region IV's at-large district.
| 1 | | Jose Conrado Benitez | July 23, 1984 | March 25, 1986 | 2nd | KBL | Elected in 1984. |
| # | Image | Member | Term of office | | Congress | Party | Electoral history |
| # | Image | Member | Start | End | Congress | Party | Electoral history |
=== Pasay's at-large district for the House of Representatives of the Philippines ===
District re-created February 2, 1987.
| 2 | | Lorna Verano-Yap | June 30, 1987 | June 30, 1992 | 8th | PDP–Laban | Elected in 1987. |
| 2 | | Lorna Verano-Yap | June 30, 1987 | June 30, 1992 | 8th | Koalisyong Pambansa | Elected in 1987. |
| 3 | | Jovito Claudio | June 30, 1992 | June 30, 1998 | 9th | LDP | Elected in 1992. |
| 3 | | Jovito Claudio | June 30, 1992 | June 30, 1998 | 10th | Lakas | Re-elected in 1995. |
| 4 | | Rolando Briones | June 30, 1998 | June 30, 2001 | 11th | NPC | Elected in 1998. |
| 4 | | Rolando Briones | June 30, 1998 | June 30, 2001 | 11th | LAMMP | Elected in 1998. |
| 4 | | Rolando Briones | June 30, 1998 | June 30, 2001 | 11th | LDP | Elected in 1998. |
| 5 | | Ma. Consuelo Dy | June 30, 2001 | June 30, 2007 | 12th | Lakas | Elected in 2001. |
| 5 | | Ma. Consuelo Dy | June 30, 2001 | June 30, 2007 | 13th | KAMPI | Re-elected in 2004. |
| 6 | | Jose Antonio Roxas | June 30, 2007 | June 30, 2010 | 14th | LDP (UNO) | Elected in 2007. |
| 6 | | Jose Antonio Roxas | June 30, 2007 | June 30, 2010 | 14th | Lakas | Elected in 2007. |
| 6 | | Jose Antonio Roxas | June 30, 2007 | June 30, 2010 | 14th | Nacionalista | Elected in 2007. |
| 7 | | Imelda Calixto-Rubiano | June 30, 2010 | June 30, 2019 | 15th | Liberal | Elected in 2010. |
| 7 | | Imelda Calixto-Rubiano | June 30, 2010 | June 30, 2019 | 16th | Liberal | Re-elected in 2013. |
| 7 | | Imelda Calixto-Rubiano | June 30, 2010 | June 30, 2019 | 17th | PDP–Laban | Re-elected in 2016. |
| 8 | | Antonino Calixto | June 30, 2019 | Incumbent | 18th | PDP–Laban | Elected in 2019. |
| 8 | | Antonino Calixto | June 30, 2019 | Incumbent | 19th | Lakas | Re-elected in 2022. |
| 8 | | Antonino Calixto | June 30, 2019 | Incumbent | 20th | Lakas | Re-elected in 2025. |

== Election results ==
=== 2025 ===
| Candidate | Party | Votes | % |
|---|---|---|---|
| Antonino Calixto (incumbent) | Lakas–CMD | 131,640 | 64.18 |
| Onie Bayona | Aksyon Demokratiko | 73,463 | 35.82 |
| Total | | 205,103 | 100.00 |
| Registered voters/turnout | | 292,695 | – |
Source: Commission on Elections

=== 2022 ===
Congressional Elections in Pasay's Lone District
| Party | Candidate | Votes | % |
|---|---|---|---|
| PDP–Laban | Antonino "Tony" Calixto | 154,422 | 78.09 |
| PRP | Efren "Choy" Alas | 19,106 | 9.66 |
| Independent | Ramon Yabut | 14,926 | 7.55 |
| Reporma | Jocelyn Sato | 9,285 | 4.70 |
| Total votes | | 197,739 | 100.00 |
| PDP–Laban hold | | | |

=== 2019 ===
Congressional Elections in Pasay's Lone District
| Party | Candidate | Votes | % |
|---|---|---|---|
| PDP–Laban | Antonino "Tony" Calixto | 136,519 | 76.50 |
| NPC | Efren "Choy" Alas | 22,372 | 12.60 |
| Independent | Elmer "Junjun" Mitra | 12,662 | 7.10 |
| PDDS | Metel Gelbolingo | 3,980 | 2.20 |
| Independent | Pedro "Pete" Ordiales | 2,850 | 1.60 |
| Total votes | | 178,383 | 100.00 |
| PDP–Laban hold | | | |

=== 2016 ===
Congressional Elections in Pasay's Lone District
| Party | Candidate | Votes | % |
|---|---|---|---|
| Liberal | Imelda "Emi" Calixto-Rubiano | 140,774 | 80.51 |
| Independent | Santiago "Sonny" Quial | 30,890 | 17.67 |
| PDP–Laban | Jose "Bong" Tebelin | 1,929 | 1.10 |
| Independent | Deo Laguipo | 1,265 | 0.72 |
| Total votes | | 174,858 | 100.00 |
| Liberal hold | | | |

=== 2013 ===
Congressional Elections in Pasay's Lone District
| Party | Candidate | Votes | % |
|---|---|---|---|
| Liberal | Imelda "Emi" Calixto-Rubiano | 130,425 | 82.05 |
| NPC | Santiago "Sonny" Quial | 24,086 | 15.15 |
| Independent | Pastor de Castro Jr. | 4,438 | 2.80 |
| Total votes | | 158,949 | 100.00 |
| Liberal hold | | | |

=== 2010 ===
Congressional Elections in Pasay's Lone District
| Party | Candidate | Votes | % |
|---|---|---|---|
| Liberal | Imelda "Emi" Calixto-Rubiano | 66,443 | 36.19 |
| Nacionalista | Jose Antonio "Lito" Roxas | 53,304 | 29.03 |
| PMP | Allan Panaligan | 32,857 | 17.89 |
| Bigkis | Rica-Elah Santos-Hortaleza | 8,667 | 4.72 |
| Valid ballots | | 161,271 | 87.83 |
| Invalid or blank votes | | 22,347 | 12.17 |
| Total votes | | 183,618 | 100.00 |
| Liberal gain from Nacionalista | | | |

=== 2007 ===
Congressional Elections in Pasay's Lone District
| Party | Candidate | Votes | % |
|---|---|---|---|
| UNO | Jose Antonio "Lito" Roxas | 49,902 | 38.87 |
| KAMPI | Allan Panaligan | 45,167 | 35.19 |
| Lakas | Ricardo "Ding" Santos | 30,493 | 23.75 |
| Liberal | Lorna Verano-Yap | 2,349 | 1.83 |
| Independent | Jose Cristobal | 240 | 0.19 |
| Independent | Saturnino Espeleta | 177 | 0.14 |
| Independent | Edgardo Santos | 43 | 0.03 |
| Total votes | | 128,371 | 100.00 |
| UNO gain from KAMPI | | | |

=== 2004 ===
Congressional Elections in Pasay's Lone District
| Party | Candidate | Votes | % |
|---|---|---|---|
| Lakas | Ma. Consuelo "Connie" Dy | 84,319 | 56.42 |
| LDP | Imelda Calixto-Rubiano | 63,986 | 42.80 |
| Independent | Justo Evangelista | 669 | 0.45 |
| Independent | Crisanto Cornejo | 488 | 0.33 |
| Total votes | | 149,462 | 100.00 |
| Lakas hold | | | |

=== 2001 ===
Congressional Elections in Pasay's Lone District
| Party | Candidate | Votes | % |
|---|---|---|---|
| Lakas | Ma. Consuelo "Connie" Dy | 52,015 | 45.11 |
| LDP | Rolando "Ding" Briones | 24,663 | 21.39 |
| PDP–Laban | Freddie Webb | 22,134 | 19.20 |
| Aksyon | Mina Gabor | 12,906 | 11.19 |
| Liberal | Panfilo "Justo" Justo | 3,021 | 2.62 |
| Independent | Allan Carreon | 241 | 0.21 |
| Independent | Pedro Montaño | 176 | 0.15 |
| Independent | Roland "Rolly" Ladesma | 149 | 0.13 |
| Total votes | | 115,305 | 100.00 |
| Lakas gain from LDP | | | |

=== 1998 ===
| Candidate | Party | Votes | % |
|---|---|---|---|
| Rolando Briones | Nationalist People's Coalition | 47,292 | 31.33 |
| Edita Vergel de Dios | Laban ng Makabayang Masang Pilipino | 38,920 | 25.79 |
| Elaine Cuneta | Lakas–NUCD–UMDP | 21,859 | 14.48 |
| Reynaldo Bagatsing | Liberal Party | 18,892 | 12.52 |
| Cesar Ochoa | Aksyon Demokratiko | 14,937 | 9.90 |
| Norma Urbina | Partido para sa Demokratikong Reporma | 8,189 | 5.43 |
| Crisanto Cornejo | Independent | 485 | 0.32 |
| Rolando Ledesma | Kilusang Bagong Lipunan | 364 | 0.24 |
| Total | | 150,938 | 100.00 |
| Nationalist People's Coalition gain from Lakas–NUCD–UMDP | | | |

=== 1995 ===
| Candidate | Party | Votes | % |
|---|---|---|---|
| Jovito Claudio (incumbent) | Lakas–NUCD–UMDP | 67,405 | 55.58 |
| Elaine Cuneta | Laban ng Demokratikong Pilipino | 53,863 | 44.42 |
| Total | | 121,268 | 100.00 |
| Lakas–NUCD–UMDP hold | | | |

=== 1992 ===
| Candidate | Party | Votes | % |
|---|---|---|---|
| Jovito Claudio | Laban ng Demokratikong Pilipino | 51,802 | 40.59 |
| Edgardo Cuneta | Independent | 43,093 | 33.77 |
| Cesar Santiago | Koalisyong Pambansa | 20,968 | 16.43 |
| Jose Comendador | Independent | 5,321 | 4.17 |
| Panfillo Villaruel | Partido Demokratiko Sosyalista ng Pilipinas | 4,028 | 3.16 |
| Reynaldo Cuyugan | People's Reform Party | 1,476 | 1.16 |
| Armando San Juan | PB/Lakas–NUCD | 698 | 0.55 |
| Francisco Peñaflor-Noel | Independent | 191 | 0.15 |
| David Reyes | Independent | 43 | 0.03 |
| Pacifico Rosal | Independent | 5 | 0.00 |
| Total | | 127,625 | 100.00 |
| Laban ng Demokratikong Pilipino gain from Koalisyong Pambansa | | | |

=== 1987 ===
Congressional Elections in Pasay's Lone District
| Party | Candidate | Votes | % |
|---|---|---|---|
| PDP–Laban | Lorna Verano-Yap | | |
| Liberal | Popoy Monsod (Salonga wing) | | |
| Nacionalista | Wenceslao Trinidad | | |
| | Reynaldo Bagatsing | | |
| | Albert Paredes | | |
| Liberal | Paterno Laracas (Kalaw wing) | | |
| Independent | Angel Gonzales | | |
| Independent | Horacio Makalintal | | |
| KBL | Rey Dimayacyac | | |
| Total votes | | | |
| PDP–Laban gain from KBL | | | |

=== 1984 ===
| Candidate | Party | Votes | % |
|---|---|---|---|
| Jose Conrado Benitez | Kilusang Bagong Lipunan | 84,772 | 51.43 |
| Eduardo Calixto | United Nationalist Democratic Organization | 70,422 | 42.72 |
| Ramon Bagatsing Jr. | Nacionalista Party | 8,366 | 5.08 |
| Glicerio Gervero | Christian Democratic Party | 727 | 0.44 |
| Jovino Angel | Independent | 192 | 0.12 |
| Elmer Villacastin | Independent | 190 | 0.12 |
| Eufemio Pollo | Independent | 106 | 0.06 |
| Liberato Roldan | Independent | 36 | 0.02 |
| Justo Evangelista | Independent | 34 | 0.02 |
| Total | | 164,845 | 100.00 |
| Kilusang Bagong Lipunan win (new seat) | | | |

== See also ==
- Legislative district of Pasay
