= Wenceslao Trinidad =

Filipino lawyer and politician

The Honorable Wenceslao B. Trinidad

12th Mayor of Pasay
- In office April 17, 2000 – June 30, 2010; Suspended: September 1, 2006 – February 1, 2007
- Vice Mayor: Gregorio Alcera (2000–01); Antonino Calixto (2001–10)
- Preceded by: Jovito Claudio
- Succeeded by: Antonino Calixto

Vice Mayor of Pasay
- In office June 30, 1992 – June 30, 1998
- Mayor: Pablo Cuneta
- Preceded by: Ibarra Cruz
- Succeeded by: Gregorio Alcera
- In office December 30, 1980 – February 27, 1986
- Mayor: Pablo Cuneta
- Preceded by: Eduardo Calixto
- Succeeded by: Vacant

Member of the Pasay City Council from the 2nd district
- In office December 30, 1963 – December 30, 1967

Personal details
- Born: Wenceslao Bayona Trinidad; August 18, 1933 Pasay, Rizal, Philippine Islands, U.S.
- Died: March 4, 2016 (aged 82) Muntinlupa, Philippines
- Party: Independent (until 1992); Nacionalista (1992–1998, 2010–2016); LAMMP (1998–2001); LDP (2001–2010); KNP (2004)
- Profession: Lawyer

Wenceslao "Peewee" Bayona Trinidad (August 18, 1933 – March 4, 2016) was a Filipino lawyer and politician who served as the mayor of Pasay City from 2000 to 2010. He previously served as the city's vice mayor from 1980 to 1986 and from 1992 to 1998 and as second district councilor from 1963 to 1967.

== Background ==
Wenceslao "Peewee" B. Trinidad was born on August 18, 1933 in Pasay.

== Political career ==
Trinidad started his political career when he was elected as councilor in 1963. He was elected three times for the same post.

He was elected as a Vice Mayor of Pasay, serving from 1980 to 1986 and from 1992 to 1998. He also ran for representative of Pasay's lone district in 1987 and for Mayor in 1988, but lost in both instances.

In 2000, due to the failing health of then-Mayor Jovito Claudio, a recall election was commenced, and he won.

Trinidad served for three terms, (with the exception of his term after his victory on 2000 recall election), from 2001–2004, 2004–2007, and 2007–2010.

From September 2006 to May 2007, Trinidad was suspended alongside 11 other Pasay city officials over the alleged irregularities in garbage collection and disposal contracts in 2004 and 2005 amounting to ₱464.6 million.

Trinidad ran for supposedly fourth non-consecutive term in 2010, but lost to Vice Mayor Antonino Calixto. He ran again for Mayor in 2013, but lost to Calixto once more.

== Controversy ==
In 2015, Trinidad and former representative Jose Antonio Roxas were sentenced to at most 10-year imprisonment and fined ₱200 each by the Sandiganbayan for their involvement in a graft case related to the construction of the Pasay City Mall and Public Market along Arnaiz Avenue in 2004.

== Death ==
Trinidad died on March 4, 2016, at the age of 82, due to pneumonia. He was buried at Loyola Memorial Park in Parañaque on March 8.

== Personal life ==
Trinidad is the father of 2019 mayoral candidate Atty. Jon Wilfred "JT" Trinidad and 2019 and 2022 councilor candidate Bonifacio "Miki" Trinidad. He is also the cousin of former Councilor Noel "Onie" Bayona, who also ran for Vice Mayor in 2010.
