= Pablo Cuneta =

Filipino politician

The Honorable Pablo Cuneta

10th Mayor of Pasay
- In office February 2, 1988 – June 30, 1998
- Vice Mayor: Ibarra Cruz (1988–1992); Wenceslao Trinidad (1992–1998)
- Preceded by: Norma Urbina
- Succeeded by: Jovito Claudio
- In office January 1, 1972 – March 26, 1986
- Vice Mayor: Eduardo Calixto (1972–1980); Wenceslao Trinidad (1980–1986)
- Preceded by: Jovito Claudio
- Succeeded by: Eduardo Calixto (OIC)
- In office January 1, 1953 – December 31, 1967
- Vice Mayor: Ruperto Galvez (1955–1959); Ansberto Paredes (1959–1963); Jovito Claudio (1963–1967)
- Preceded by: Primitivo Lovina Sr.
- Succeeded by: Jovito Claudio

Deputy Governor of Rizal
- In office 1947–1949

Personal details
- Born: Pablo Pablo Cuneta Sr. February 2, 1910 Pasay, Rizal, Philippine Islands
- Died: September 27, 2000 (aged 90) Makati, Metro Manila, Philippines
- Resting place: Manila Memorial Park, Parañaque, Philippines
- Party: LDP (1995–2000)
- Other political affiliations: Independent (1988–1995); Nacionalista (1947–1978); KBL (1978–1986)
- Spouse(s): Generosa Francisco; Elinor "Elaine" Gamboa
- Relations: Helen Gamboa (sister-in-law); Vicente "Tito" Sotto III (brother-in-law); KC Concepcion (granddaughter)
- Children: 12 (including Sharon)

Pablo Pablo Cuneta Sr. (Tagalog pronunciation: [kuˈnɛtɐ]; February 2, 1910 – September 27, 2000) was a Filipino politician who served as the mayor of Pasay for several non-consecutive terms between 1951 and 1998. With a mayoral tenure of 39 years, he is the second longest-serving mayor in the history of the Philippines, after Francisco P. Felix in Cainta. He was the father of actress and singer Sharon Cuneta.

== Early life ==
Cuneta was born on February 2, 1910, in Pasay (then a municipality of Rizal) to Catalino Cuneta y García (c. 1871 – c. 1948) and Miguela Pablo y de la Cruz (c. 1873 – October 15, 1948).

== Personal life ==
He was first married to Generosa Francisco. They had ten children: Edgardo, Reynaldo, Leonides, Rosauro, Leticia, Jaime, Carmencita, Pablo Jr., Generoso, and Aida.

After Generosa’s death, he married Elinor "Elaine" Gamboa (December 31, 1934 – November 5, 2014); they remained married until his death in 2000. Together, they had two children: César "Chet" and Sharon.

== Political career ==
Cuneta started his political career when he served as deputy governor of Rizal from 1947 to 1949. In 1951, he was appointed Pasay mayor. Four years later, he ran for mayor and won. He ran again and won, in the 1959 and 1963 elections. In 1967, he was defeated by Jovito Claudio. He bounced back in the 1971 national elections and was re-elected again in 1980. He stepped down when the Aquino government was swept into power in 1986. Two years later, he again won in the local elections. He would top the local elections again in 1992 and 1995. At the end of his term in 1998, he had been Pasay mayor for 39 years, the second longest-serving mayor in Philippine history. He is the only mayor to have served under seven different presidents: Elpidio Quirino, Ramon Magsaysay, Carlos P. Garcia, Diosdado Macapagal, Ferdinand Marcos, Corazon Aquino and Fidel Ramos.

== Health and death ==
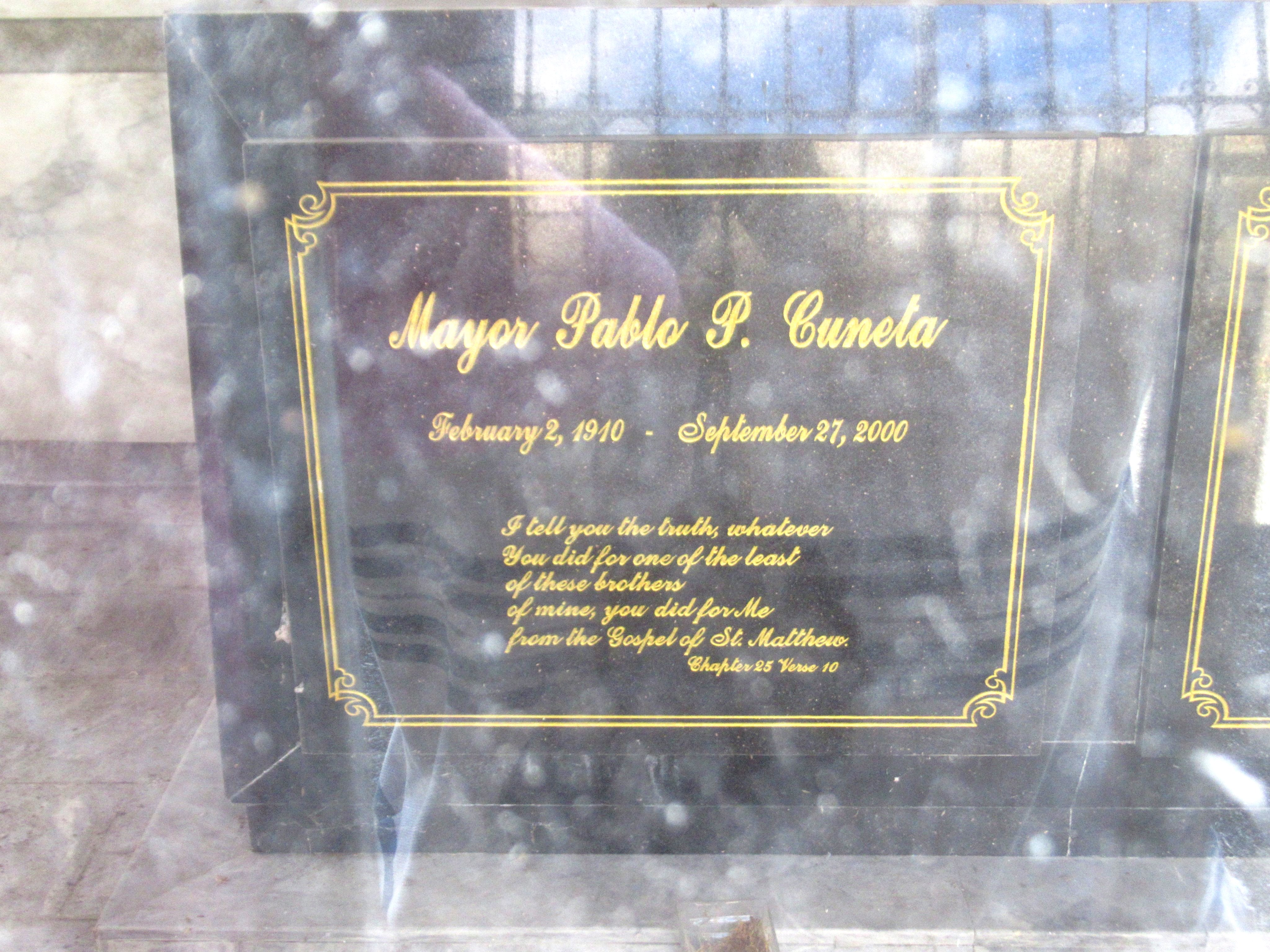
Cuneta's grave at Manila Memorial Park – Sucat.

Cuneta was in good health until December 1996 when he started suffering from rheumatism and arthritis. In 1997, he suffered a mild seizure and was admitted to the Makati Medical Center and died due to cardiac arrest on September 27, 2000, at the age of 90. He was buried at the Manila Memorial Park in Parañaque.

== Legacy ==
Cuneta's administration is credited with the construction of the Maricaban Settlement, Pamantasan ng Lungsod ng Pasay (now City University of Pasay), Pasay City General Hospital and the Cuneta Astrodome, among other projects.
