= 1984 PBA First All-Filipino Conference =

PBA Conference

- Duration: March 25 – July 17, 1984
- TV partner(s): Vintage Sports (MBS)

Finals
- Champions: Crispa Redmanizers
- Runners-up: Gilbey's Gin Tonics

PBA First All-Filipino Conference chronology
- < 1983 1984 2nd >

PBA conference chronology
- < 1983 Open 1984 Second All-Filipino >

The 1984 Philippine Basketball Association (PBA) All-Filipino Conference was the first conference of the 1984 PBA season. It started on March 25 and ended on July 17, 1984.

== Format ==
The following format will be observed for the duration of the conference:

- Double-round eliminations; 14 games per team; Teams are then seeded by basis on win–loss records.
- The two teams at the bottom of the standings after the elimination round will be eliminated. The top two teams will advance outright to the semifinals.
- The next four teams will qualify in a single round robin quarterfinals. Results from the elimination round will be carried over. The top two teams will advance to the semifinals.
- Semifinals will be a double round robin affair with the four remaining teams. The top two teams in the semifinals advance to the best-of-seven finals. The last two teams dispute the third-place trophy in a best-of-seven series.

== Elimination round ==
Pos	Team	W	L	PCT	GB	Qualification
1	Northern Cement (G)	11	3	.786	—	Advance to semifinal round
2	Crispa Redmanizers	10	4	.714 (Note: Semifinal round berth playoff: Crispa 124–120 Great Taste)	1	Advance to semifinal round
3	Great Taste Coffee Makers	10	4	.714	1	Proceed to quarterfinal round
4	Beer Hausen Brewmasters	8	6	.571	3	Proceed to quarterfinal round
5	Gilbey's Gin Tonics	8	6	.571	3	Proceed to quarterfinal round
6	Gold Eagle Beermen	4	10	.286	7	Proceed to quarterfinal round
7	Tanduay Rhum Makers	3	11	.214	8	
8	Country Fair Hotdogs	2	12	.143	9	

(G) Guests

== Semifinal berth playoff ==
Vintage

June 10

Crispa Redmanizers 124, Great Taste Coffee Makers 120

Araneta Coliseum, Quezon City

== Quarterfinal round ==
Pos	Team	W	L	PCT	GB	Qualification
3	Beer Hausen Brewmasters	2	1	.667	—	Semifinal round
4	Gilbey's Gin Tonics	2	1	.667	—	Semifinal round
5	Great Taste Coffee Makers	1	2	.333	1	
6	Gold Eagle Beermen	1	2	.333	1	

== Semifinal round ==
Pos	Team	W	L	PCT	GB	Qualification
1	Crispa Redmanizers	4	2	.667	—	Advance to the Finals
2	Gilbey's Gin Tonics	3	3	.500 (Note: Second-seed playoff: Gilbey's 115–109 Beer Hausen)	1	Advance to the Finals
3	Beer Hausen Brewmasters	3	3	.500	1	Proceed to third place playoff
4	Northern Cement (G)	2	4	.333	2	Proceed to third place playoff

(G) Guests

== Third place playoffs ==
Vintage

July 8

Northern Consolidated (NCC) 118, Beer Hausen Brewmasters 124

Araneta Coliseum, Quezon City

Vintage

July 10

Northern Consolidated (NCC) 134, Beer Hausen Brewmasters 126

Araneta Coliseum, Quezon City

Vintage

July 12

Northern Consolidated (NCC) 110, Beer Hausen Brewmasters 109

Araneta Coliseum, Quezon City

Vintage

July 15

Northern Consolidated (NCC) 139, Beer Hausen Brewmasters 116

Araneta Coliseum, Quezon City

Vintage

July 17

Northern Consolidated (NCC) 127, Beer Hausen Brewmasters 133
Series aborted; Northern wins series by virtue of having more wins, 3–2, when series was aborted

Araneta Coliseum, Quezon City

== Finals ==
Vintage

July 8

Crispa Redmanizers 127, Gilbey's Gin Tonics 118

Araneta Coliseum, Quezon City

Vintage

July 10

Crispa Redmanizers 144, Gilbey's Gin Tonics 120

Araneta Coliseum, Quezon City

Vintage

July 12

Crispa Redmanizers 105, Gilbey's Gin Tonics 118

Araneta Coliseum, Quezon City

Vintage

July 15

Crispa Redmanizers 115, Gilbey's Gin Tonics 109

Araneta Coliseum, Quezon City

Vintage

July 17

Crispa Redmanizers 134, Gilbey's Gin Tonics 118
Crispa wins series, 4–1

Araneta Coliseum, Quezon City
