= 1984 PBA Second All-Filipino Conference =

Basketball tournament

- Duration: August 5 – November 4, 1984
- TV partner(s): Vintage Sports (MBS)

Finals
- Champions: Great Taste Coffee Makers
- Runners-up: Beer Hausen Brewmasters

PBA Second All-Filipino Conference chronology
- < 1984 1st 1985 >

PBA conference chronology
- < 1984 First All-Filipino 1984 Invitational >

The 1984 Philippine Basketball Association (PBA) 2nd All-Filipino Conference was the second conference of the 1984 PBA season. It started on August 5 and ended on November 4, 1984. This is the second All-Filipino tournament of the season.

== Format ==
The following format will be observed for the duration of the conference:

- The teams were divided into 2 groups.

Group A:

1. Northern Consolidated (NCC)
2. Crispa Redmanizers
3. Gold Eagle Beer
4. Tanduay Rhum

Group B:

1. Great Taste Coffee
2. Gilbey's Gin Tonics
3. Beer Hausen
4. Country Fair Hotdogs

- Teams in a group will play against each other once and against teams in the other group twice; 11 games each.
- The top two teams after the eliminations will advance to the semifinals outright.
- The Remaining six teams will play in a best-of-three quarterfinal series (pairings were decided by the league) to determine the other three teams that will qualify into the next round.
- The top two teams after the two-round semifinals will face each other in a best-of-five championship series. The next two teams will play for a best-of-five playoff for third place.

== Classification round ==
Pos	Team	W	L	PCT	GB	Qualification
1	Great Taste Coffee Makers	9	2	.818	—	Advance to semifinal round
2	Northern Cement (G)	8	3	.727	1	Advance to semifinal round
3	Crispa Redmanizers	7	4	.636	2	Proceed to quarterfinals
4	Gilbey's Gin Tonics	6	5	.545	3	Proceed to quarterfinals
5	Gold Eagle Beermen	5	6	.455	4	Proceed to quarterfinals
6	Beer Hausen Brewmasters	5	6	.455	4	Proceed to quarterfinals
7	Tanduay Rhum Makers	4	7	.364	5	Proceed to quarterfinals
8	Country Fair Hotdogs	0	11	.000	9	Proceed to quarterfinals

(G) Guests

== Quarterfinals ==
=== (3) Crispa vs. (5) Gold Eagle ===
Vintage

September 25

Crispa Redmanizers 128, Gold Eagle Beermen 120 (2OT)

Araneta Coliseum, Quezon City

Vintage

September 27

Crispa Redmanizers 116, Gold Eagle Beermen 113 (OT)
Crispa wins series, 2–0

Araneta Coliseum, Quezon City

=== (4) Gilbey's vs. (7) Tanduay ===
Vintage

September 23

Gilbey's Gin Tonics 112, Tanduay Rhum Makers 114

Araneta Coliseum, Quezon City

Vintage

September 25

Gilbey's Gin Tonics 123, Tanduay Rhum Makers 112

Araneta Coliseum, Quezon City

Vintage

September 30

Gilbey's Gin Tonics 117, Tanduay Rhum Makers 122
Gilbey's wins series, 2–1

Araneta Coliseum, Quezon City

=== (6) Beer Hausen vs. (8) Country Fair ===
Vintage

September 23

Beer Hausen Brewmasters 111, Country Fair Hotdogs 88

Araneta Coliseum, Quezon City

Vintage

September 27

Beer Hausen Brewmasters 148, Country Fair Hotdogs 104
Beer Hausen wins series, 2–0

Araneta Coliseum, Quezon City

Beer Hausen, Crispa and Tanduay won their respective series to enter the semifinal round.

== Semifinal round ==
Pos	Team	W	L	PCT	GB	Qualification
1	Great Taste Coffee Makers	6	2	.750	—	Advance to the Finals
2	Beer Hausen Brewmasters	5	3	.625 (Note: Second-seed playoff: Beer Hausen 122–117 Northern (OT))	1	Advance to the Finals
3	Northern Cement (G)	5	3	.625	1	Proceed to third place playoff
4	Tanduay Rhum Makers	2	6	.250 (Note: Fourth-seed playoff: Tanduay 134–122 Crispa)	4	Proceed to third place playoff
5	Crispa Redmanizers	2	6	.250	4	

(G) Guests

== Third place playoffs ==
Vintage

October 28

Tanduay Rhum Makers 135, Northern Consolidated (NCC) 121
Scoring by quarter: 25-20, 25-34, 39-31, 46-36
Pts: Allan Abelgas 35	Pts: Alfie Almario 24

Araneta Coliseum, Quezon City

Vintage

October 30

Tanduay Rhum Makers 127, Northern Consolidated (NCC) 95
Scoring by quarter: 24-20, 28-23, 31-25, 44-27
Pts: Dennis Abbatuan 51	Pts: Alfie Almario 17

Araneta Coliseum, Quezon City

Vintage

November 4

Tanduay Rhum Makers 110, Northern Consolidated (NCC) 148
Scoring by quarter: 26-35, 24-36, 23-44, 37-33
Pts: Rey Lazaro 25	Pts: Chip Engelland 60
Series aborted with Tanduay leading 2–1; Tanduay wins series by leading 2–1 when series when aborted

Araneta Coliseum, Quezon City

- The Finals ended in three games, earlier than the third place playoffs. The league aborted the series, awarding Tanduay third place by virtue of leading the series 2–1 before the series was aborted.

== Finals ==
Vintage

October 28

Great Taste Coffee Makers 101, Beer Hausen Brewmasters 88

Araneta Coliseum, Quezon City

Vintage

October 30

Great Taste Coffee Makers 111, Beer Hausen Brewmasters 99

Araneta Coliseum, Quezon City

Vintage

November 4

Great Taste Coffee Makers 101, Beer Hausen Brewmasters 94
Great Taste wins series, 3–0

Araneta Coliseum, Quezon City
