= 1984 PBA Invitational championship =

- Duration: November 18 – December 18, 1984
- TV partner(s): Vintage Sports (MBS)

Finals
- Champions: Great Taste Coffee Makers
- Runners-up: Crispa Redmanizers

Awards
- Best Import: Jeff Collins (Great Taste Coffee Makers)

PBA Invitational championship chronology
- < 1982 2003 >

PBA conference chronology
- < 1984 Second All-Filipino 1985 Open >

The 1984 PBA Invitational championship was the third conference of the 1984 PBA season. It started on November 18 and ended on December 18, 1984. Imports return to action after two All-Filipino conferences.

== Format ==
The following format will be observed for the duration of the tournament:

- Five teams qualified in the Invitational championship. Gold Eagle Beer gained the 5th entry over Tanduay Rhum Makers based on their won-loss records in the elimination round of the first two conferences. The Beermen had nine wins and 16 losses compared to Tanduay's seven wins and 18 losses combined slates despite the Rhum Makers making it to the semifinals of the second All-Filipino Conference.
- The top two teams at the end of the double-round eliminations advance to the best-of-five finals. The third and fourth-place finishers play in the best-of-five series for third place.

== Qualification ==
These are win–loss records from the two All-Filipino conferences' elimination rounds this season:

Pos	Team	W	L	PCT	Qualification
1	Great Taste Coffee Makers	19	6	.760	Qualified to tournament
2	Crispa Redmanizers	17	8	.680	Qualified to tournament
3	Gilbey's Gin Tonics	14	11	.560	Qualified to tournament
4	Beer Hausen Brewmasters	13	12	.520	Qualified to tournament
5	Gold Eagle Beermen	9	16	.360	Qualified to tournament
6	Tanduay Rhum Makers	7	18	.280	
7	Country Fair Hotdogs	2	23	.080	

== Elimination round ==
Pos	Team	W	L	PCT	GB	Qualification
1	Great Taste Coffee Makers	7	1	.875	—	Advance to the finals
2	Crispa Redmanizers	6	2	.750	1	Advance to the finals
3	Beer Hausen Brewmasters	4	4	.500	3	Proceed to third place playoff
4	Gilbey's Gin Tonics	2	6	.250	5	Proceed to third place playoff
5	Gold Eagle Beermen	1	7	.125	6	

== Third place playoffs ==
Vintage

December 9

Beer Hausen Brewmasters 133, Gilbey's Gin Tonics 125
Pts: Butch Hays 40	Pts: Washam 52 Watson 35

Araneta Coliseum, Quezon City

Vintage

December 11

Beer Hausen Brewmasters 100, Gilbey's Gin Tonics 106
Pts: Butch Hays 38	Pts: Tony Washam 49

Araneta Coliseum, Quezon City

Vintage

December 13

Beer Hausen Brewmasters 110, Gilbey's Gin Tonics 105
Pts: Butch Hays 37	Pts: Tony Washam 40

Araneta Coliseum, Quezon City

Vintage

December 16

Beer Hausen Brewmasters 124, Gilbey's Gin Tonics 110
Pts: Butch Hays 41	Pts: Tony Washam 40
Beer Hausen wins series, 3–1

Araneta Coliseum, Quezon City

== Finals ==
1984 PBA Invitational championship finals
Team	Coach	Wins
Great Taste Coffee Makers	Baby Dalupan	3
Crispa Redmanizers	Narciso Bernardo	2
- Dates: December 9 to December 18, 1984
- Television: Vintage (GTV)

PBA Invitational championship finals chronology
- < 1982 2003 >

PBA finals chronology
- < 1984 Second All-Filipino 1985 All-Filipino >

The 1984 Philippine Basketball Association (PBA) Invitational championship finals was the best-of-5 basketball championship series of the 1984 PBA Invitational. Great Taste Coffee Makers and Crispa Redmanizers played for the 28th championship contested by the league.

Great Taste Coffee Makers won their finals series against Crispa via 3–2 series.

=== Series scoring summary ===
The following scoring summary is written in a line score format, except that the quarter numbers are replaced by game numbers.

Team	Game 1	Game 2	Game 3	Game 4	Game 5	Wins
Great Taste	138	117	103	117	127	3
Crispa	115	118	116	105	106	2

† denotes the number of overtimes

=== Scores ===
Vintage

December 9

recap

Great Taste Coffee Makers 138, Crispa Redmanizers 115
Scoring by quarter: 34-22, 27-34, 28-26, 49-33
Pts: Collins 40 Brown 36	Pts: Willis 31 Guidaben 29

Araneta Coliseum, Quezon City
Referees: R. Bartolome, R. Victorino, W. Mateo

The Coffee Makers were ahead by only seven, 89-82, going into the final period, Ricardo Brown hit nine points in an 11-2 blast as their lead ballooned to 14 points, 100-86. Import Jeff Collins took over the scoring chores and came up with an eight-point run for Great Taste to decide the issue, 114-92.

Vintage

December 11

recap

Great Taste Coffee Makers 117, Crispa Redmanizers 118
Scoring by quarter: 35-30, 25-25, 30-32, 27-31
Pts: Ricardo Brown 39	Pts: Carlton Willis 33

Araneta Coliseum, Quezon City

The Redmanizers took a 75-71 lead in the third quarter, after trailing the Coffee Makers throughout the game. In the fourth period, after a three-point play by Freddie Hubalde to tie the count at 90-all, a 9-2 run by Great Taste, resulted to a seven-point spread with nine minutes left in the ballgame. Going into the last two minutes of play, Jeff Collins' reverse dunk gave the Coffee Makers a five-point lead but Freddie Hubalde's two unanswered baskets bring the Great Taste' lead to only one with 1:05 to go. Ricardo Brown scored two-for-two from the stripe after being hacked by Carlton Willis, 117-114 for Great Taste. Willis then scored on a short drive with 35 seconds left, the Coffee Makers became a little too lax and Ricardo Brown snapped off a jumper that was too strong it bounced off the ring right into the hands of Abet Guidaben, a lead pass to Arturo Cristobal, who spotted Freddie Hubalde waiting in the frontcourt and scored with 4.4 seconds on the clock. Great Taste calls two timeouts and in the inbound play, Jeff Collins broke free and went for a three-pointer that was short, the Redmanizers evened up the series at one game each.

Vintage

December 13

recap

Great Taste Coffee Makers 103, Crispa Redmanizers 116
Scoring by quarter: 21-23, 28-28, 24-31, 30-34
Pts: Ricardo Brown 29	Pts: Abet Guidaben 25

Araneta Coliseum, Quezon City

From a 51-49 halftime edge in favor of Crispa, the Coffee Makers started the third period on an 8-0 run for a 57-51 lead as the Redmanizers were held scoreless in the first 1:36 of the second half. Philip Cezar scored on a lay-up that set off Crispa's own 11-2 blast that pushed them ahead, 62-59. With 1:26 left in the third quarter, Crispa got their first double-digit lead at 79-69. The Redmanizers went up by 14 points in the fourth quarter, 90-76, but Great Taste rallied to within 94-98 with still 5:28 remaining. A three-point play by Abet Guidaben off Alejo Alolor's fourth foul seal the Coffee Makers' fate and Philip Cezar followed that up with a lay-up on a four on one fastbreak, 103-94 for Crispa.

Vintage

December 16

Great Taste Coffee Makers 117, Crispa Redmanizers 105
Scoring by quarter: 32-25, 22-32, 32-21, 31-27
Pts: Collins 39 Brown 33	Pts: Carlton Willis 32

Araneta Coliseum, Quezon City

The Coffee Makers took a 47-36 advantage in the second quarter but the Redmanizers came back and even lead at halftime, 57-54. In the fourth quarter from a precarious 103-97 six-point edge for Great Taste, Jeff Collins did the scoring for the Coffee Makers in a three-minute span to settle the issue, 112-99.

Vintage

December 18

Great Taste Coffee Makers 127, Crispa Redmanizers 106
Scoring by quarter: 34-24, 29-24, 30-24, 34-34
Pts: Jeff Collins 33	Pts: Carlton Willis 20
Great Taste wins series, 3–2

Araneta Coliseum, Quezon City

Jeff Collins sparked three devastating spurts that opened a commanding 56-40 lead for the Coffee Makers late in the second quarter, a finishing 15-6 third quarter run by Great Taste put the game's outcome beyond doubt. Abet Guidaben of Crispa fouled out with 1:58 left in the third quarter to hasten the Redmanizers' downfall. Great Taste raced to a 28-point margin, 108-80 with 4:54 left in the final period.
