= 1984 PBA Second All-Filipino Conference finals =

Basketball championship

Team	Coach	Wins
Great Taste Coffee Makers	Baby Dalupan	3
Beer Hausen Brewmasters	Loreto Carbonell	0
- Dates: October 28 – November 4, 1984
- Television: Vintage Sports (MBS)
- Radio network: DZRP

Referees
- Game 2: E. Cruz, R. Bartolome, E. Iñoza

PBA Second All-Filipino Conference finals chronology
- < 1984 First 1985 >

The 1984 PBA Second All-Filipino Conference finals was the best-of-5 basketball championship series of the 1984 PBA Second All-Filipino Conference, and the conclusion of the conference playoffs. The Great Taste Coffee Makers and Beer Hausen Brewmasters played for the 28th championship contested by the league.

Great Taste Coffee Makers won their finals series against Beer Hausen via 3–0 sweep for their first-ever PBA title.

== Qualification ==
Great Taste		Beer Hausen
Finished 9–2 (.818)	Eliminations	Finished 5–6 (.455)
Outright semis	Quarterfinals	2–0 sweep over Country Fair (best-of-3)
Finished 6–2 (.750), 1st	Semifinals	Finished 5–3 (.625), tied for 2nd
Finished 6–2 (.750), 1st	Tiebreaker	Won against Northern (NCC), 122–117

== Games summary ==
=== Game 1 ===
Vintage

October 28

Great Taste Coffee Makers 101, Beer Hausen Brewmasters 88
Scoring by quarter: 20–13, 29–24, 22–23, 30–28
Pts: Manny Victorino 25	Pts: Ramon Fernandez 27

Araneta Coliseum, Quezon City

The Coffee Makers went on to lead by as much as 16 points in the third quarter at 57–41. The Brewmasters rallied to within five, 76–81. A 13–6 flurry sparked by Manny Victorino and Arnie Tuadles settled the issue for Great Taste, 99–86, with 49 seconds left, from an 86–80 count.

=== Game 2 ===
Vintage

October 30

Great Taste Coffee Makers 111, Beer Hausen Brewmasters 99
Scoring by quarter: 29–28, 29–26, 25–26, 30–26
Pts: Ricardo Brown 48	Pts: Ricky Relosa 27

Araneta Coliseum, Quezon City
Referees: E. Cruz, R. Bartolome, E. Iñoza

=== Game 3 ===
Vintage

November 4

Great Taste Coffee Makers 101, Beer Hausen Brewmasters 94
Scoring by quarter: 28–14, 26–22, 32–27, 15–31
Pts: Ricardo Brown 30	Pts: Ramon Fernandez 36
Great Taste wins series, 3–0

Araneta Coliseum, Quezon City

1984 PBA Second All-Filipino Conference Champions

Great Taste Coffee Makers
First title

== Rosters ==
Great Taste Coffee roster
Players
Coaches

Pos.	No.	Nat.	Name	Ht.	Wt.
C	1	(Philippines)	Manny Victorino	6 ft 5 in (1.96 m)		José Rizal
G/F	2	(Philippines)	Alejo Alolor	6 ft 1 in (1.85 m)		Visayas
G	4	(Philippines)	Frankie Lim	5 ft 11 in (1.80 m)		San Beda
C	7	(Philippines)	Joel Banal	6 ft 5 in (1.96 m)		Mapúa
G	11	(Philippines)	Jaime Manansala	5 ft 11 in (1.80 m)		UE
F	14	(Philippines)	Chito Loyzaga	6 ft 3 in (1.91 m)		San Beda
F	19	(Philippines)	Woodrow Balani	6 ft 0 in (1.83 m)		Visayas
F	22	(Philippines)	Arnie Tuadles	6 ft 1 in (1.85 m)		Visayas
G	23	(United States)	Ricardo Brown	5 ft 11 in (1.80 m)		Pepperdine
F	29	(Philippines)	Bernardo Carpio	6 ft 3 in (1.91 m)		Ateneo
F	33	(Philippines)	Bogs Adornado	6 ft 1 in (1.85 m)		UST
C	45	(Philippines)	Redentor Vicente	6 ft 5 in (1.96 m)		José Rizal

Head coach

- (Philippines) Baby Dalupan

Assistant coach(es)

- (Philippines) Jimmy Mariano

Legend

- (C) Team captain
- Injured

Beer Hausen roster
Players
Coaches

Pos.	No.	Nat.	Name	Ht.	Wt.
F/C	3	(Philippines)	Edgardo Cordero	6 ft 3 in (1.91 m)		UST
G	7	(Philippines)	Roberto De la Rosa	5 ft 11 in (1.80 m)		Far Eastern
C	10	(Philippines)	Ramon Fernandez	6 ft 4 in (1.93 m)		San Carlos
F	12	(Philippines)	Victor Sanchez	6 ft 3 in (1.91 m)		Mapúa
F	13	(Philippines)	Abet Gutierrez	6 ft 2 in (1.88 m)		Ateneo de Davao
F	14	(Philippines)	Leopoldo Herrera	6 ft 3 in (1.91 m)		Wesleyan Philippines
F	15	(Philippines)	Ricky Relosa	6 ft 3 in (1.91 m)		Mapúa
F	16	(Philippines)	Angelito Esguerra	6 ft 2 in (1.88 m)		Letran
G	18	(Philippines)	Emerito Legaspi	6 ft 0 in (1.83 m)		UE
F/C	19	(Philippines)	Nicanor Bulaong	6 ft 4 in (1.93 m)		Far Eastern
G	24	(Philippines)	Ramon Cruz	5 ft 11 in (1.80 m)		UE
G/F	32	(Philippines)	Timoteo Coloso	6 ft 2 in (1.88 m)		Letran
G	34	(Philippines)	Miguel Bilbao	5 ft 8 in (1.73 m)		De La Salle

Head coach

- (Philippines) Loreto Carbonell

Assistant coach(es)

Legend

- (C) Team captain
- Injured

== Broadcast notes ==
Game	Play-by-play	Analyst
Game 1		
Game 2	Joe Cantada	Norman Black
Game 3		
