= PBA Most Improved Player award =

The Philippine Basketball Association (PBA) Most Improved Player award is awarded to the player who showed marked improvement in his game year-on-year.

== Winners ==
^	Denotes player who is still active in the PBA
*	Inducted into the PBA Hall of Fame
Team (X)	Denotes the number of times a player from this team has won

Season	Player	Position	Country of birth	Team	Ref.
1983	Terry Saldaña	Power forward / Center	Philippines	Gilbey's Gin Tonics	
1984	Manny Victorino	Center / Power forward	Philippines	Great Taste Coffee Makers	
1985	Padim Israel	Small forward / Power forward	Philippines	Tanduay Rhum Makers	
1986	Ricky Relosa	Center / Power forward	Philippines	Alaska Milkmen	
1987	Yoyoy Villamin	Center / Power forward	Philippines	Hills Bros. Coffee Kings (2)	
1988	Alvin Teng	Center / Power forward	Philippines	San Miguel Beermen	
1989	Dante Gonzalgo	Small forward	Philippines	Añejo Rum 65ers	
1990	Rey Cuenco	Power forward / Center	Philippines	Añejo Rum 65ers (2)	
1991	Ato Agustin	Shooting guard / Point guard	Philippines	San Miguel Beermen (2)	
1992	Pido Jarencio	Point guard / Shooting guard	Philippines	Ginebra San Miguel (3)	
1993	Vergel Meneses	Shooting guard / Small forward	Philippines	Swift Mighty Meaty Hotdogs	
1994	Bong Hawkins	Power forward	Philippines	Alaska Milkmen (3)	
1995	Bonel Balingit	Center	Philippines	Sunkist Orange Juicers (2)	
1996	Poch Juinio	Center	Philippines	Alaska Milkmen (4)	
1997	Bong Ravena	Shooting guard / Small forward	Philippines	Purefoods Carne Norte Beefies	
1998	Patrick Fran	Point guard	Philippines	Mobiline Phone Pals	
1999	Elmer Lago	Shooting guard / Small forward	Philippines	Barangay Ginebra Kings (4)	
2000	Mark Telan	Power forward / Center	Philippines	Shell Velocity	
2001	Noy Castillo	Shooting guard / Point guard	United States	Purefoods Tender Juicy Hotdogs (2)	
2002	Rob Duat	Shooting guard / Small forward	Philippines	Alaska Aces (5)	
2003	Rafi Reavis^	Center	United States	Coca-Cola Tigers	
2004–05	Enrico Villanueva	Center	Philippines	Red Bull Barako	
2005–06	Marc Pingris	Power forward	Philippines	Purefoods Chunkee Giants (3)	
2006–07	Gary David	Shooting guard	Philippines	Air21 Express	
2007–08	Cyrus Baguio	Shooting guard	Philippines	Red Bull Barako (2)	
2008–09	Jonas Villanueva	Point guard	Philippines	San Miguel Beermen (3)	
2009–10	LA Tenorio	Point guard	Philippines	Alaska Aces (6)	
2010–11	Jayson Castro^	Point guard	Philippines	Talk 'N Text Tropang Texters (2)	
2011–12	Jeff Chan	Small forward / Shooting guard	Philippines	Rain or Shine Elasto Painters	
2012–13	KG Canaleta	Small forward / Power forward	Philippines	Air21 Express	
2013–14	June Mar Fajardo^	Center	Philippines	San Miguel Beermen (4)	
2014–15	Terrence Romeo	Point guard / Shooting guard	Philippines	GlobalPort Batang Pier	
2015–16	Jericho Cruz^	Shooting guard	Philippines	Rain or Shine Elasto Painters (2)	
2016–17	Chris Ross^	Point guard / Shooting guard	United States	San Miguel Beermen (5)	
2017–18	Scottie Thompson^	Shooting guard / Point guard	Philippines	Barangay Ginebra San Miguel (5)	
2019	Moala Tautuaa^	Center / Power forward	United States	San Miguel Beermen (6)	
2020	Prince Caperal	Center / Power forward	Philippines	Barangay Ginebra San Miguel (6)	
2021	Juami Tiongson^	Point guard	Philippines	Terrafirma Dyip	
2022–23	Maverick Ahanmisi^	Point guard / Shooting guard	United States	Converge FiberXers	
2023–24	Jhonard Clarito^	Small forward / Shooting guard	Philippines	Rain or Shine Elasto Painters (3)	
2024–25	Joshua Munzon^	Shooting guard / Small forward	United States	NorthPort Batang Pier (2)	
