= List of Salvadorian records in Olympic weightlifting =

The following are the national records in Olympic weightlifting in El Salvador. Records are maintained in each weight class for the snatch lift, clean and jerk lift, and the total for both lifts by the Federación Salvadorena de Levantamiento de Pesas.

== Current records ==
=== Women ===
Event	Record	Athlete	Date	Meet	Place	Ref
48 kg
Snatch	65 kg	July Mendoza	5 August 2026	CAC Games	Santo Domingo, Dominican Republic	
Clean & Jerk						
Total						
53 kg
Snatch						
Clean & Jerk						
Total						
58 kg
Snatch						
Clean & Jerk						
Total						
63 kg
Snatch	kg					
Clean & Jerk	kg					
Total	kg					
69 kg
Snatch						
Clean & Jerk						
Total						
77 kg
Snatch						
Clean & Jerk						
Total						
86 kg
Snatch						
Clean & Jerk						
Total						
+86 kg
Snatch						
Clean & Jerk						
Total						

== Historical records ==
=== Men (2018–2025) ===
Event	Record	Athlete	Date	Meet	Place	Ref
55 kg
Snatch	93 kg	Jonatan Henriquez	19 April 2021	Pan American Championships	Santo Domingo, Dominican Republic	
Clean & Jerk	115 kg	Jonatan Henriquez	19 April 2021	Pan American Championships	Santo Domingo, Dominican Republic	
Total	208 kg	Jonatan Henriquez	19 April 2021	Pan American Championships	Santo Domingo, Dominican Republic	
61 kg
Snatch	105 kg	Julio Salamanca	27 July 2019	Pan American Games	Lima, Peru	
Clean & Jerk	138 kg	Julio Salamanca	19 April 2021	Pan American Championships	Santo Domingo, Dominican Republic	
Total	243 kg	Julio Salamanca	19 April 2021	Pan American Championships	Santo Domingo, Dominican Republic	
67 kg
Snatch	110 kg	Ramon Cruz	April 2019	Pan American Championships	Guatemala City, Guatemala	
Clean & Jerk	140 kg	Ramon Cruz	April 2019	Pan American Championships	Guatemala City, Guatemala	
Total	250 kg	Ramon Cruz	April 2019	Pan American Championships	Guatemala City, Guatemala	
73 kg
Snatch	126 kg	Ramon Cruz	25 June 2023	CAC Games	San Salvador, El Salvador	
Clean & Jerk	164 kg	Ramon Cruz	25 June 2023	CAC Games	San Salvador, El Salvador	
Total	290 kg	Ramon Cruz	25 June 2023	CAC Games	San Salvador, El Salvador	
81 kg
Snatch	117 kg	Ramon Cruz	21 April 2021	Pan American Championships	Santo Domingo, Dominican Republic	
Clean & Jerk	146 kg	Ramon Cruz	21 April 2021	Pan American Championships	Santo Domingo, Dominican Republic	
Total	263 kg	Ramon Cruz	21 April 2021	Pan American Championships	Santo Domingo, Dominican Republic	
89 kg
Snatch	127 kg	Juan Álvarez	25 April 2019	Pan American Championships	Guatemala City, Guatemala	
Clean & Jerk	155 kg	Juan Álvarez	25 April 2019	Pan American Championships	Guatemala City, Guatemala	
Total	282 kg	Juan Álvarez	25 April 2019	Pan American Championships	Guatemala City, Guatemala	
96 kg
Snatch	125 kg	Juan Carlos Álvarez	29 July 2019	Pan American Games	Lima, Peru	
Clean & Jerk	160 kg	Juan Carlos Álvarez	29 July 2019	Pan American Games	Lima, Peru	
Total	285 kg	Juan Carlos Álvarez	29 July 2019	Pan American Games	Lima, Peru	
102 kg
Snatch	120 kg	Gabriel Brizuela	26 April 2019	Pan American Championships	Guatemala City, Guatemala	
Clean & Jerk	145 kg	Gabriel Brizuela	26 April 2019	Pan American Championships	Guatemala City, Guatemala	
Total	265 kg	Gabriel Brizuela	26 April 2019	Pan American Championships	Guatemala City, Guatemala	
109 kg
Snatch	130 kg	Franklin Rauda	27 June 2023	CAC Games	San Salvador, El Salvador	
Clean & Jerk	295 kg	Franklin Rauda	27 June 2023	CAC Games	San Salvador, El Salvador	
Total						
+109 kg
Snatch	150 kg	Rodrigo Morales	27 June 2023	CAC Games	San Salvador, El Salvador	
Clean & Jerk	180 kg	Rodrigo Morales	28 February 2024	Pan American Championships	Caracas, Venezuela	
Total	330 kg	Rodrigo Morales	28 February 2024	Pan American Championships	Caracas, Venezuela	

=== Women (2018–2025) ===
Event	Record	Athlete	Date	Meet	Place	Ref
45 kg
Snatch						
Clean & Jerk						
Total						
49 kg
Snatch	75 kg	Margoth Reynoso	27 July 2019	Pan American Games	Lima, Peru	
Clean & Jerk	88 kg	Margoth Reynoso	27 July 2019	Pan American Games	Lima, Peru	
Total	163 kg	Margoth Reynoso	27 July 2019	Pan American Games	Lima, Peru	
55 kg
Snatch	77 kg	Victoria Grenni	24 June 2023	CAC Games	San Salvador, El Salvador	
Clean & Jerk	96 kg	Victoria Grenni	25 February 2024	Pan American Championships	Caracas, Venezuela	
Total	171 kg	Victoria Grenni	25 February 2024	Pan American Championships	Caracas, Venezuela	
59 kg
Snatch	65 kg	Estebana Osorio	25 June 2023	CAC Games	San Salvador, El Salvador	
Clean & Jerk	85 kg	Estebana Osorio	25 June 2023	CAC Games	San Salvador, El Salvador	
Total	150 kg	Estebana Osorio	25 June 2023	CAC Games	San Salvador, El Salvador	
64 kg
Snatch	70 kg	Blanca Aleman	25 June 2023	CAC Games	San Salvador, El Salvador	
Clean & Jerk	80 kg	Blanca Aleman	25 June 2023	CAC Games	San Salvador, El Salvador	
Total	150 kg	Blanca Aleman	25 June 2023	CAC Games	San Salvador, El Salvador	
71 kg
Snatch						
Clean & Jerk						
Total						
76 kg
Snatch	83 kg	Maria Garzona	26 June 2023	CAC Games	San Salvador, El Salvador	
Clean & Jerk	102 kg	Maria Garzona	26 June 2023	CAC Games	San Salvador, El Salvador	
Total	185 kg	Maria Garzona	26 June 2023	CAC Games	San Salvador, El Salvador	
81 kg
Snatch						
Clean & Jerk						
Total						
87 kg
Snatch	73 kg	Keren Guerrero	26 June 2023	CAC Games	San Salvador, El Salvador	
Clean & Jerk	90 kg	Keren Guerrero	26 June 2023	CAC Games	San Salvador, El Salvador	
Total	163 kg	Keren Guerrero	26 June 2023	CAC Games	San Salvador, El Salvador	
+87 kg
Snatch	90 kg	Caren Torres de Fuentes	30 July 2019	Pan American Games	Lima, Peru	
Clean & Jerk	119 kg	Caren Torres de Fuentes	27 June 2023	CAC Games	San Salvador, El Salvador	
Total	205 kg	Caren Torres de Fuentes	30 July 2019	Pan American Games	Lima, Peru	

== Historical records ==
=== Men (1998–2018) ===
Event	Record	Athlete	Date	Meet	Place	Ref
56 kg
Snatch	100 kg	Marvin Lopez	8 April 2010		Panama City, Panama	
Clean and Jerk	135 kg	Marvin Lopez	8 April 2010		Panama City, Panama	
Total	235 kg	Marvin Lopez	8 April 2010		Panama City, Panama	
62 kg
Snatch	120 kg	Julio Salamanca				
Clean & Jerk	155 kg	Julio Salamanca	4 March 2013		San José, Costa Rica	
Total	275 kg	Julio Salamanca				
69 kg
Snatch						
Clean & Jerk						
Total						
77 kg
Snatch						
Clean and Jerk						
Total						
85 kg
Snatch						
Clean and Jerk						
Total						
94 kg
Snatch						
Clean and Jerk						
Total						
105 kg
Snatch						
Clean and Jerk						
Total						
+105 kg
Snatch						
Clean and Jerk						
Total						

=== Women (1998–2018) ===
Event	Record	Athlete	Date	Meet	Place	Ref
48 kg
Snatch	67 kg	Genesis Murcia	4 March 2013		San José, Costa Rica	
Clean and Jerk	85 kg	Genesis Murcia	4 March 2013		San José, Costa Rica	
Total	171 kg	Genesis Murcia				
53 kg
Snatch						
Clean and Jerk						
Total						
58 kg
Snatch	70 kg	Estebana Osorio	5 March 2013		San José, Costa Rica	
Clean and Jerk	85 kg	Estebana Osorio	5 March 2013		San José, Costa Rica	
Total	155 kg	Estebana Osorio	5 March 2013		San José, Costa Rica	
63 kg
Snatch						
Clean and Jerk	102 kg	Jacqueline Zuñiga	6 March 2013		San José, Costa Rica	
Total	182 kg	Jacqueline Zuñiga	6 March 2013		San José, Costa Rica	
69 kg
Snatch						
Clean and Jerk	102 kg	Karla Carcamo	7 March 2013		San José, Costa Rica	
Total	180 kg	Karla Carcamo	7 March 2013		San José, Costa Rica	
75 kg
Snatch						
Clean and Jerk						
Total						
90 kg
Snatch	115 kg	Eva Dimas	19 July 2006	Central American and Caribbean Games	Cartagena, Colombia	
Clean and Jerk	142 kg	Eva Dimas	19 July 2006	Central American and Caribbean Games	Cartagena, Colombia	
Total	257 kg	Eva Dimas	19 July 2006	Central American and Caribbean Games	Cartagena, Colombia	
+90 kg
Snatch						
Clean and Jerk						
Total						
