= 1984 Great Taste Coffee Makers season =

- Head coach: Baby Dalupan
- Owner(s): CFC Corporation

1st All Filipino Conference results
- Record: 11–7 (61.1%)
- Place: 5th
- Playoff finish: Quarterfinals

2nd All Filipino Conference results
- Record: 18–4 (81.8%)
- Place: 1st
- Playoff finish: Champions

Invitational Conference results
- Record: 10–3 (76.9%)
- Place: 1st
- Playoff finish: Champions

Great Taste Coffee Makers seasons

The 1984 Great Taste Coffee Makers season was the 10th season of the franchise in the Philippine Basketball Association (PBA).

== Transactions ==
Players Added	Signed	Former team
Woodrow Balani	Off-season	Galerie Dominique (disbanded)
Redentor Vicente	Off-season	Galerie Dominique (disbanded)
Chito Loyzaga	Off-season	Toyota (disbanded)
Arnie Tuadles	Off-season	Toyota (disbanded)
Frankie Lim	Off-season	Tanduay Rhum Makers

== Awards ==
- Ricardo Brown and Manny Victorino were named in the Mythical Five selection.
- Manny Victorino was the season's Most Improved Player
- Jeff Collins won the best import award in the Invitational Conference

== Championships ==
The Great Taste Coffee Makers finally join the elite club of champion teams as they won their first-ever title in the 2nd All-Filipino Conference by scoring a 3-0 sweep over newcomer Beer Hausen. The Gokongwei ballclub captured their second straight PBA championship by winning the Invitational Third Conference in a battle of champions as they defeated Crispa Redmanizers in the best-of-five title series, three games to two.

== Win–loss records vs opponents ==
Teams	Win	Loss	1st All-Filipino	2nd All-Filipino	3rd (Invitational)
Beer Hausen	8	3	2-1	5-1	1-1
Country Fair	3	0	2-0	1-0	N/A
Crispa Redmanizers	10	4	1-2	4-0	5-2
Gilbey’s Gin	2	4	0-3	0-1	2-0
Gold Eagle Beer	5	2	2-1	1-1	2-0
Northern (NCC)	6	0	2-0	4-0	N/A
Tanduay Rhum	5	1	2-0	3-1	N/A
Total	39	14	11-7	18-4	10-3

== Roster ==
Great Taste Coffee roster
Players
Coaches

Pos.	No.	Nat.	Name	Ht.	Wt.
C	1	(Philippines)	Manny Victorino	6 ft 5 in (1.96 m)		José Rizal
G/F	2	(Philippines)	Alejo Alolor	6 ft 1 in (1.85 m)		Visayas
G	4 & 44	(Philippines)	Frankie Lim	5 ft 11 in (1.80 m)		San Beda
C	7	(Philippines)	Joel Banal	6 ft 5 in (1.96 m)		Mapúa
G	11	(Philippines)	Jaime Manansala	5 ft 11 in (1.80 m)		UE
F	14	(Philippines)	Chito Loyzaga	6 ft 3 in (1.91 m)		San Beda
F	19	(Philippines)	Woodrow Balani	6 ft 0 in (1.83 m)		Visayas
F	22	(Philippines)	Arnie Tuadles	6 ft 1 in (1.85 m)		Visayas
G	23	(United States)	Ricardo Brown	5 ft 11 in (1.80 m)		Pepperdine
G	24	(United States)	Jeff Collins (I)	6 ft 2 in (1.88 m)		UNLV
F	29	(Philippines)	Bernardo Carpio	6 ft 3 in (1.91 m)		Ateneo
F	33	(Philippines)	Bogs Adornado	6 ft 1 in (1.85 m)		UST
G	34	(United States)	Angelo Robinson (I)	6 ft 3 in (1.91 m)		Utah
C	45	(Philippines)	Redentor Vicente	6 ft 5 in (1.96 m)		José Rizal

Head coach

- (Philippines) Baby Dalupan

Assistant coach(es)

- (Philippines) Jimmy Mariano

Team manager

- (Philippines) Ignacio Gotao

Legend

- (C) Team captain
- (I) Import
- Injured
