= 1984 Beer Hausen Brewmasters season =

- Head coach: Loreto Carbonell
- Owner: Asia Brewery

1st All Filipino Conference results
- Record: 15–14 (51.7%)
- Place: 4th
- Playoff finish: Semifinals

2nd All Filipino Conference results
- Record: 13–12 (52%)
- Place: 2nd
- Playoff finish: Finals (lost to Great Taste)

Invitational Conference results
- Record: 7–5 (58.3%)
- Place: 3rd
- Playoff finish: N/A

Beer Hausen Brewmasters seasons

The 1984 Beer Hausen Brewmasters season was the 1st season of the franchise in the Philippine Basketball Association (PBA).

== New team ==
As the league enters its 10th season, the famed Toyota Super Corollas ballclub that won 9 PBA titles, formally disbanded and sold its franchise to Basic Holdings Inc., a mother company of Asia Brewery. The team will carry the name Beer Hausen. Seven players from Toyota, led by Ramon Fernandez, were absorbed by the Brewmasters.

Beer Hausen has acquired four players from Tanduay Rhum Makers namely Mike Bilbao, Alberto Gutierrez, Victor Sanchez and Roberto dela Rosa. The team also signed two players from Grandslam champions Crispa Redmanizers, they are Ramon Cruz and sophomore Angelito Esguerra.

== Notable dates ==
March 27: In the first meeting between two Toyota superstars; Ramon Fernandez and Robert Jaworski, former teammates now playing on opposite sides, Beer Hausen defeated Gilbey's Gin, 105–97. Fernandez scored 19 points, grabbed 17 rebounds and issued 17 assists in the first of more than 20 triple-doubles El presidente made during the season.

October 25: Beer Hausen defeated Northern Consolidated, 122–117 in overtime, in a knockout game to reach the finals of the second conference against Great Taste. Ramon Fernandez recorded his 24th triple-double performance of the season by scoring 44 points, pulled down 17 rebounds and issuing 15 assists.

== Finals stint ==
Beer Hausen advance to the finals in the second conference, the second team after Filmanbank in 1978, to reach the championship in their first year of participation. The Brewmasters were swept in three games by Great Taste Coffee Makers.

== Awards ==
Ramon Fernandez capped a season of triple-double performances by bagging the Most Valuable Player (MVP) trophy, his second MVP award in three years.

== Win–loss records vs opponents ==
Teams	Win	Loss	1st All-Filipino	2nd All-Filipino	3rd (Invitational)
Country Fair	5	0	2-0	3-0	N/A
Crispa Redmanizers	3	7	2-2	1-3	0-2
Gilbey's Gin	7	6	3-3	0-1	4-2
Gold Eagle Beer	6	1	2-1	2-0	2-0
Great Taste Coffee	3	8	1-2	1-5	1-1
Northern (NCC)	6	8	3-6	3-2	N/A
Tanduay Rhum	5	1	2-0	3-1	N/A
Total	35	31	15-14	13-12	7-5

== Roster ==
Beer Hausen roster
Players
Coaches

Pos.	No.	Nat.	Name	Ht.	Wt.
F/C	3	(Philippines)	Edgardo Cordero	6 ft 3 in (1.91 m)		UST
G	7	(Philippines)	Roberto De la Rosa	5 ft 11 in (1.80 m)		Far Eastern
C	10	(Philippines)	Ramon Fernandez	6 ft 4 in (1.93 m)		San Carlos
G	11	(United States)	William Hays (I)	6 ft 3 in (1.91 m)		California
F	12	(Philippines)	Victor Sanchez	6 ft 3 in (1.91 m)		Mapúa
F	13	(Philippines)	Abet Gutierrez	6 ft 2 in (1.88 m)		Ateneo de Davao
F	14	(Philippines)	Leopoldo Herrera	6 ft 3 in (1.91 m)		Wesleyan Philippines
F	15	(Philippines)	Ricky Relosa	6 ft 3 in (1.91 m)		Mapúa
F	16	(Philippines)	Angelito Esguerra	6 ft 2 in (1.88 m)		Letran
G	18	(Philippines)	Emerito Legaspi	6 ft 0 in (1.83 m)		UE
F/C	19	(Philippines)	Nicanor Bulaong	6 ft 4 in (1.93 m)		Far Eastern
G	24	(Philippines)	Ramon Cruz	5 ft 11 in (1.80 m)		UE
G/F	32	(Philippines)	Timoteo Coloso	6 ft 2 in (1.88 m)		Letran
G	34	(Philippines)	Miguel Bilbao	5 ft 8 in (1.73 m)		De La Salle

Head coach

- (Philippines) Loreto Carbonell

Assistant coach(es)

Team manager

- (Philippines) Andy Jao

Legend

- (C) Team captain
- (I) Import
- Injured
