= Frankie Lim =

Filipino basketball player and coach

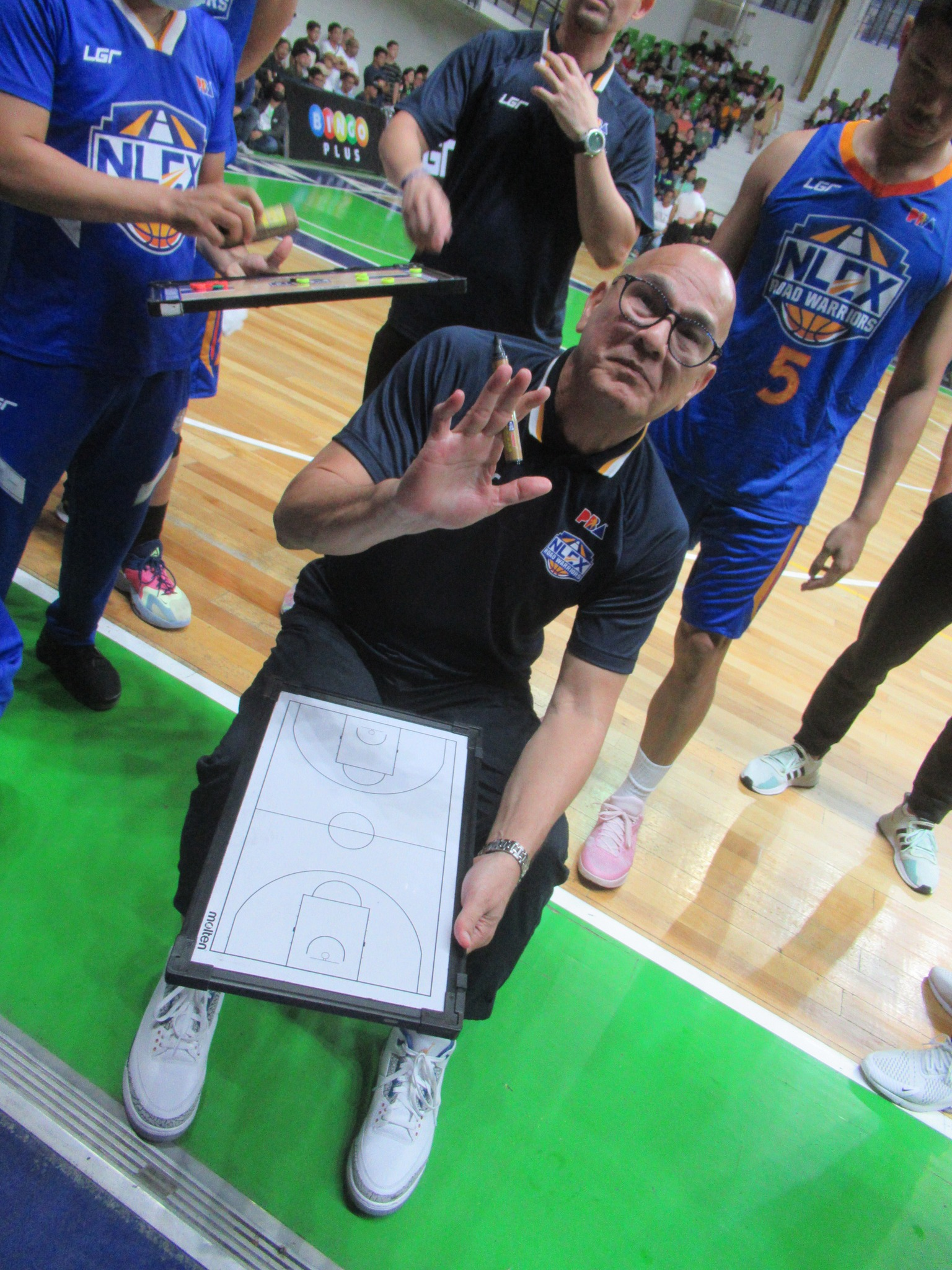
- Lim coaching the NLEX Road Warriors in 2023

Personal information
- Born: February 29, 1960 (age 66)
- Listed height: 5 ft 11 in (1.80 m)
- Listed weight: 154 lb (70 kg)

Career information
- High school: Don Bosco (Mandaluyong)
- College: San Beda
- PBA draft: 1982
- Drafted by: YCO-Tanduay
- Playing career: 1982–1996
- Coaching career: 1997–present

Career history

Playing
- 1982–1983: Tanduay Rhum Makers
- 1984–1985: Great Taste Coffee Makers
- 1986–1992: Alaska Milkmen
- 1993–1994: Purefoods Tender Juicy Hotdogs
- 1995: Formula Shell Gas Kings
- 1996: San Miguel Beermen

Coaching
- 1997–1998: Purefoods Carne Norte Beefies (assistant)
- 1999–2000: Mobiline Phone Pals (assistant)
- 2007–2011: San Beda
- 2013–2014: Stadium Jakarta
- 2015: Barangay Ginebra San Miguel (assistant)
- 2015: Barangay Ginebra San Miguel
- 2018–2020: Perpetual
- 2022–2024: NLEX Road Warriors

Career highlights
- As head coach: 4× NCAA seniors' champion (2007, 2008, 2010, 2011); As assistant: PBA champion (1997 All-Filipino); As player: 6× PBA champion (1984 2nd All-Filipino, 1984 Invitational, 1985 All-Filipino, 1991 Third Conference, 1993 All-Filipino, 1994 Commissioner's); 2× NCAA seniors' champion (1977, 1978); As executive: 2× PBA champion (2003 All-Filipino, 2008–09 Philippine)
Medals
Men's basketball
Representing Philippines
ABC Under-18 Championship
Silver medal – second place	1980 Bangkok	Team
SEA Games
Gold medal – first place	1981 Manila	Team

Francisco "Frankie" Lim (born February 29, 1960) is a Filipino former basketball player, basketball coach and executive. He played 15 seasons in the PBA.

He later became a successful coach, leading his alma mater San Beda Red Lions to four NCAA seniors titles. Lim previously served as head coach of the NLEX Road Warriors.

== Playing career ==
Lim played collegiate ball at San Beda College where he was a member of the last championship team that won the NCAA crown in 1978 (it was then followed by a 28-year title drought that ended in 2006). While in the amateur ranks, he suited up for YCO Painters in the old MICAA, which was then coached by Freddie Webb. He was part of the Philippine training team of coach Ron Jacobs in 1981 that took home the Jones Cup title.

He turned pro in 1982 and was signed by Yco-Tanduay. Lim moved to Great Taste in his third season and won his first championship with the Coffee Makers. He spent most of the 1985 PBA season with knee problems and on the injured list. In 1986, he was acquired by new team Alaska Milkmen and Lim shared playmaker roles with Marte Saldaña and later on with Ric-Ric Marata. He was the last from the original Alaska roster to leave the squad in 1993 when he transferred to Purefoods. Lim won two championships with the Hotdogs before playing his final two seasons with Shell and San Miguel.

== Coaching career ==
=== Purefoods and Talk 'N Text ===
After retiring as a player, Lim was named an assistant of Eric Altamirano in Purefoods in 1997. Two years later, Altamirano moved to Talk 'N Text; Lim declined to be named interim coach as he wanted his first coaching stint to be a permanent one; he joined Altamirano in Talk 'N Text instead. With a change in management, the entire coaching staff was fired, but new owner Manuel V. Pangilinan later hired him as team manager of the team.

=== San Beda ===
Lim then coached the San Beda Red Lions in the NCAA, where he won four titles with the school in 2007, 2008, 2010, and 2011. In 2010, his team posted an immaculate record of 18-0 by sweeping all its opponents from the eliminations to the finals.

In 2012, he resigned, just before he was set to serve a two-year ban from the NCAA for getting involved in a brawl with then San Sebastian College-Recoletos volleyball head coach Roger Gorayeb.

=== Indonesia ===
In 2013, he briefly left the Philippines to coach Stadium Jakarta in Indonesia's National Basketball League.

=== Ginebra ===
In January 2015, he joined Ginebra as an assistant coach to Ato Agustin. After the team suffered another early exit in the 2015 PBA Commissioner's Cup, he was appointed head coach of the Gin Kings, replacing Agustin.

In June 2015, Lim was fined and suspended for striking out at Calvin Abueva. Abueva clashed with Orlando Johnson after a heated play, before LA Tenorio shoved Abueva hard who fell close to Lim, who seemed to lash out. The Philippine Basketball Association suspended Lim for a game, also well as giving him a fine along with Abueva, Johnson, and Tenorio for their respective roles in the incident.

=== Perpetual ===
In late 2017, Lim returned to the NCAA after being named as basketball consultant of the Perpetual Altas; this was reportedly after the league lifted its suspension against Lim. A month later, he was appointed head coach of the Altas. With the onset of the COVID-19 pandemic, University of Perpetual Help System DALTA shut down its athletic program, suspending contracts of its coaches, including Lim's. He subsequently resigned after leading the Altas to the semifinals in his first year, only to finish with a losing record in the next season.

=== NLEX ===
In 2022, the NLEX Road Warriors appointed Lim as their head coach, after then coach Yeng Guiao declined the management's offer of him taking a corporate role instead of coaching. Lim is set to serve his PBA suspension from his last stint with Ginebra in 2015 on the Abueva incident on his supposed first game on charge at NLEX.

== Coaching style ==
He is best known as a disciplinarian who employs the run-and-gun system.

== Personal life ==
Lim is married to Olen Juarez-Lim, a former model and a public speaker. Frankie and Olen had three children, including Miakka, a one-time volleyball player for the De La Salle Lady Spikers and courtside reporter in the PBA TV coverage, and Melo, who Frankie coached at San Beda, and an assistant coach at NLEX Road Warriors. Lim also considered his import player Sudan Daniel as an adopted son, and mourned his in death in 2020.

== Coaching record ==
=== Collegiate record ===
Season	Team	Elimination round					Playoffs				
Season	Team	GP	W	L	PCT	Finish	GP	W	L	PCT	Results
2007	SBC	12	11	1	.917	1st	3	3	0	1.000	Champions
2008	SBC	14	11	3	.786	1st	5	3	2	.600	Champions
2009	SBC	18	16	2	.889	1st	4	2	2	.500	Finals
2010	SBC	16	16	0	1.000	1st	2	2	0	1.000	Champions
2011	SBC	18	16	2	.889	1st	4	4	0	1.000	Champions
2018	UPHSD	18	11	7	.611	4th	1	0	1	.000	Semifinals
2019	UPHSD	18	5	13	.278	7th	—	—	—	—	Eliminated
Totals		114	86	28	.754		19	14	5	.736	4 championships

=== Professional record ===
==== NBL Indonesia ====
Season	Team	Regular season					Playoffs				
Season	Team	GP	W	L	Pts	Finish	PG	W	L	PCT	Results
2013–14	Stadium Jakarta	33	16	17	49	6th	3	1	2	.333	Quarterfinals

==== PBA ====
Season	Team	Conference	Elimination round					Playoffs				
Season	Team	Conference	GP	W	L	PCT	Finish	PG	W	L	PCT	Results
2014–15	Barangay Ginebra	Governors' Cup	11	5	6	.445	8th	1	0	1	.000	Quarterfinals
2022–23	NLEX	Commissioner's Cup	12	5	7	.417	9th	—	—	—	—	Eliminated
2022–23	NLEX	Governors' Cup	11	7	4	.636	6th	1	0	1	.000	Quarterfinals
Career total			34	17	17	.500	Playoff Total	2	0	2	.000	0 championships

Preceded by Koy Banal	San Beda Red Lions men's basketball head coach 2007–2011	Succeeded by Ronnie Magsanoc
Preceded by Nosa Omorogbe	Perpetual Altas men's basketball head coach 2018–2020	Succeeded by Myk Saguiguit
