= Manny Victorino =

Filipino basketball player (born 1958)

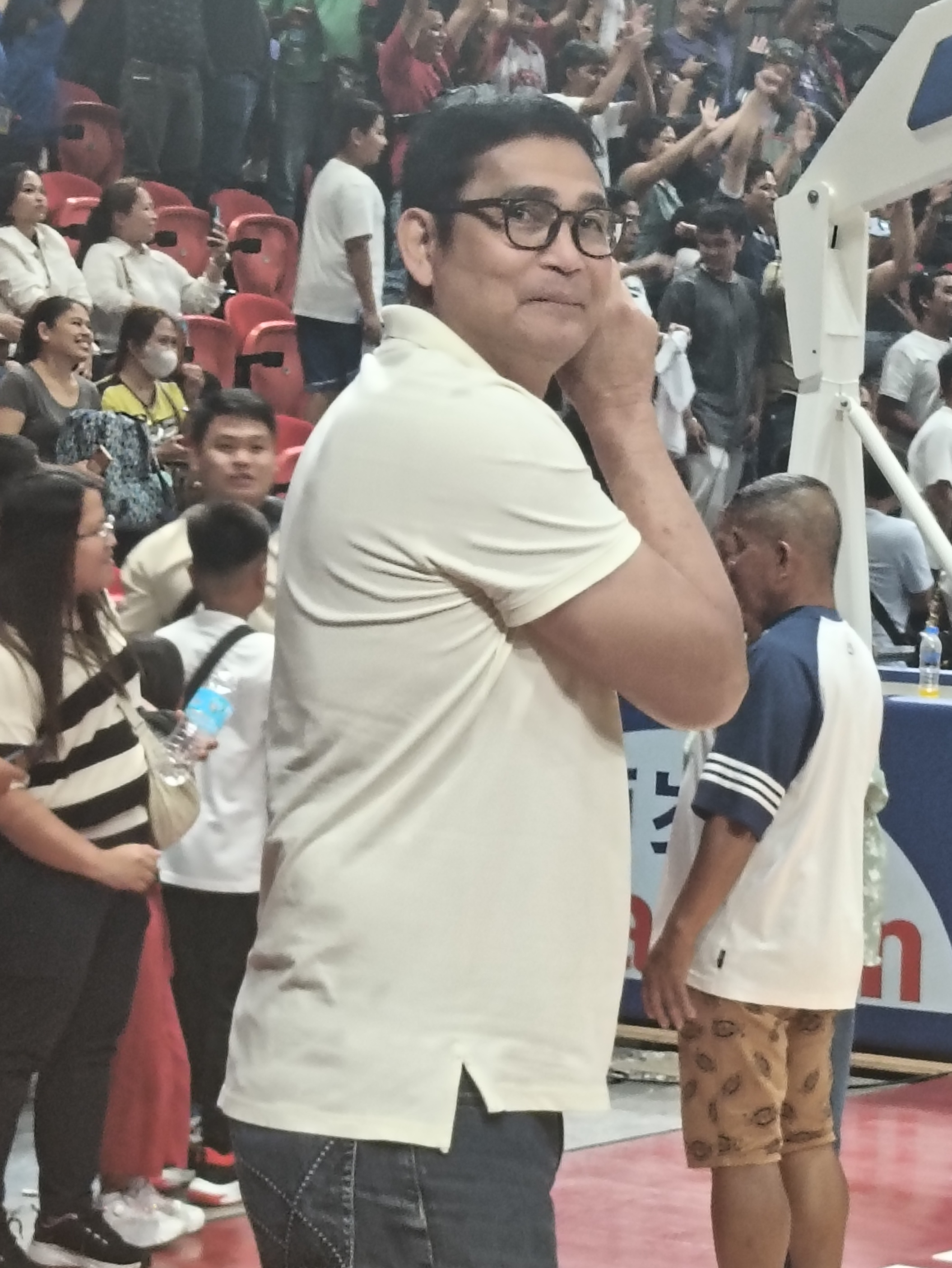
- Victorino in 2025

Personal information
- Born: December 30, 1958 (age 67) Mandaluyong, Philippines
- Listed height: 6 ft 5 in (1.96 m)
- Listed weight: 202 lb (92 kg)

Career information
- College: JRU
- Playing career: 1981–1999
- Position: Forward / center

Career history
- 1981–1986: Great Taste Coffee Makers
- 1987–1988: Shell Azocord/Rimula X
- 1989–1990: Presto Tivolis
- 1991–1992: Pepsi/7-Up Uncolas
- 1993: Ginebra San Miguel
- 1994: Purefoods Tender Juicy Hotdogs
- 1996: Sunkist Orange Bottlers
- 1998: Cagayan de Oro Nuggets (MBA)
- 1999: Surigao Miners (MBA)

Career highlights
- 6× PBA champion (1984 Second All-Filipino, 1984 Invitational, 1985 Open, 1985 All-Filipino, 1990 All-Filipino, 1994 Commissioner's); 5× PBA All-Star; PBA Most Improved Player (1984); 3× PBA Mythical First Team (1984–1986); 50 Greatest Players in PBA History (2025 selection)

Manuel "Manny" Victorino (born December 30, 1958) is a Filipino retired professional basketball player in the Philippine Basketball Association (PBA).

== Player profile ==
Victorino is a 6'5" (1.96m) player who combines his size with speed and skill. He’s a strong post-up player with a smooth hook shot, while also being a reliable perimeter shooter and a solid finisher on the fast break. Despite his size, he moves well on the wings and often finishes strong, usually with powerful slam dunks.

The former José Rizal Heavy Bomber in the NCAA first caught the attention of cage buffs when he made it as alternate in the RP Youth team which took part in the 1979 World Youth Basketball championship held in Brazil. He entered the PBA in 1981 and was taken by Presto Fun Drinks from their farm team in the MICAA. Victorino went on to hold his own at a time when all-time greats Ramon Fernandez and Abet Guidaben were lording it over in the league. His stock climbed phenomenally in a span of few years and was already challenging Fernandez and company for supremacy inside the paint.

=== Mythical team and championships ===
His finest season came in 1984 when he won two titles for Great Taste and was named the league's Most Improved Player. He earn a spot on the Mythical Team for the first time that year and for three straight seasons until 1986, Victorino became a permanent fixture on the Mythical Five selection.

=== Traded to Shell and return to Presto ===
In 1987, he was shipped by Great Taste to Shell in a pre-season trade for Philip Cezar. After two uneventful seasons with the Diesel Oilers, Victorino return to the Presto (formerly Great Taste) camp, the ballclub in which he was part of a dynasty of four straight championships from 1984-1985. He was second to Allan Caidic in scoring for Presto in the 1989 All-Filipino Conference, compile stats of 19.4 points and 7.2 rebounds an outing. Won his last championship with the Gokongwei franchise in the 1990 All-Filipino Conference, besting Purefoods Hotdogs in a seven-game series. Victorino's numbers were down with sophomore Zaldy Realubit getting more on his playing time.

=== Stints with Pepsi, Ginebra, and Purefoods ===
He was traded to Pepsi for the Hotshots' first round pick in 1991 and Victorino got to play alongside Abet Guidaben for two seasons. In 1993, he welcomed the opportunity to play with Sonny Jaworski after being traded by Pepsi to Ginebra in exchange for rookie Victor Pablo. The following year, Ginebra traded him to Purefoods for Benito Cheng and his average and playing minutes went down, playing back-up role to Jerry Codiñera at the post. He won his final championship with Purefoods in the Commissioner's Cup but was left unsigned at the end of the year.

At age 37, he came back to play for Sunkist in his final PBA season.

=== Stats, records, and oddities ===
In his 15–year basketball career, he scored 9,596 points in 727 games for a 13.2 point average and collected 4,450 rebounds, 1,035 assists, 817 shot blocks and 222 steals. He was the 18th player to hit the 5000–point mark in 1987 with Shell and was the seventh player to reach the 1,000 rebound plateau on both the offensive and defensive ends.

=== MBA stint ===
He later played a few games in the Metropolitan Basketball Association with the Cagayan de Oro Nuggets in 1998 and Surigao Miners in 1999 before calling it quits.

Victorino currently resides in Los Angeles, California with his family. He also plays regularly during Legends games.

== Other media ==
Victorino appeared with his son Myki in ABS-CBN's former noontime show, Wowowee in 2009. He also competed in TV5's dance reality show Shall We Dance?.
