= Loreto Carbonell =

Filipino basketball player (1932–2017)

Personal information
- Born: December 10, 1932 Malita, Davao, Philippine Islands
- Died: September 23, 2017 (aged 84) Parañaque, Philippines

Career information
- College: San Beda

Career history

Playing
- 1956: YCO Painters

Coaching
- 1974: YCO Painters
- 1976–1978: San Beda
- 1984–1985: Manila Beer Brewmasters
- 1985: Manila Beer Brewmasters (assistant)

Career highlights
- As coach: 2× NCAA Philippines champion (1977, 1978); MICAA champion (1974)

Loreto "Bonnie" Dilema Carbonell (December 10, 1932 – September 23, 2017) was a Filipino basketball player who competed in the 1956 Summer Olympics.

== Career ==
=== Playing career ===
Sometime during his early years, Father Richard Cronin, a Jesuit priest from the Ateneo de Davao University taught Carbonell the behind the back dribble technique. This would help to become a star player of the San Beda College varsity team. In 1956, he scored 48 points in an NCAA single match surpassing the previous scoring record of Carlos Badion of Mapúa. He also played for the YCO Painters of the Manila Industrial and Commercial Athletic Association.

=== National team career ===
Carbonell played for the Philippines men's national basketball team.

He helped the team win the bronze medal at the 1954 FIBA World Championship and was also part of the Leo Prieto-coached squad that participated at the 1956 Summer Olympics. He was also part of the team which defended their Asian Games title in the 1958 edition of the games. Carbonell played for the Philippine team which finished in eight place in the 1959 FIBA World Championship. He then led the team to a title a year later at the 1960 ABC Championship.

He failed to make it to the national team which competed 1960 Summer Olympics due to contracting sinusitis during the tryouts. He never played for the national team after that.

=== Coaching career ===
After his stint with the national team, Carbonell turned to coaching. At the 1974 MICAA Championship, he helped his old team YCO cause an upset over the Crispa Redmanizers. He aided the team of his alma mater, San Beda win two consecutive NCAA titles in 1977 and 1978. He would later help San Beda win another title. The Carbonell-coached Beer Hausen Brewmasters had a runner up finish in the 1984 PBA Second All-Filipino Conference losing to Great Taste in the finals. He also coached the PBA team of Tanduay. He served as a consultant for San Beda until his death.

== Death and legacy ==
He died on September 23, 2017, due to cardiac arrest. He is part of the San Beda Sports Hall of Fame.
