= 1984 Gold Eagle Beermen season =

- Head coach: Nat Canson
- Owner: San Miguel Corporation

1st All Filipino Conference results
- Record: 5–12 (29.4%)
- Place: 6th
- Playoff finish: Quarterfinals

2nd All Filipino Conference results
- Record: 5–8 (38.5%)
- Place: 7th
- Playoff finish: Quarterfinals

Invitational Conference results
- Record: 1–7 (12.5%)
- Place: 5th
- Playoff finish: N/A

Gold Eagle Beermen seasons

The 1984 Gold Eagle Beermen season was the 10th season of the franchise in the Philippine Basketball Association (PBA).

== Transactions ==
Players Added	Signed	Former team
Abe King	Off-season	Toyota (disbanded)
Joey Loyzaga ^{Rookie}	Off-season	N/A
Dante Gonzalgo ^{Rookie}	Off-season	N/A
Noli Banate	Off-season	Winston
Evalson Valencia	Off-season	Winston

== Occurrences ==
In the third and last playing date of the quarterfinal round on June 17, the Beermen and the Gilbey's Gin Tonics battled for the last seat in the round of four semifinals, Gilbey's won, 106–104, but the match was put under protest by Gold Eagle, citing a malfunctioning 25-second shot clock and the PBA technical committee, acting on the protest have ordered a replay. Two nights later on June 19, Gilbey's Gin left no doubt as to their rightful claim to the semifinal round by winning the replayed game over the Beermen by nine points, 115–106.

After Crispa release their import Herman Barnes, who played only one game for the Redmanizers, the Gold Eagle Beermen signed him up but sooner decided to replace Barnes in favor of Floyd Hooper.

== Won-loss records vs Opponents ==
Teams	Win	Loss	1st All-Filipino	2nd All-Filipino	3rd (Invitational)
Beer Hausen	1	6	1-2	0-2	0–2
Country Fair	2	2	0-2	2-0	N/A
Crispa Redmanizers	0	7	0-2	0-3	0–2
Gilbey's Gin	3	4	1-2	1-1	1-1
Great Taste Coffee	2	5	1-2	1-1	0–2
Northern (NCC)	1	2	1-1	0-1	N/A
Tanduay Rhum	2	1	1-1	1-0	N/A
Total	11	27	5-12	5-8	1-7

== Roster ==
1984 Gold Eagle Beermen roster
Players

Pos.	#	POB	Name	Height	Weight	DOB (YYYY–MM–DD)	From
G	5	(Philippines)	Biboy Ravanes	6 ft 0 in (1.83 m)			Cebu
F	6	(Philippines)	Abe King	6 ft 3 in (1.91 m)			San Beda
G	7	(Philippines)	Marte Saldaña	5 ft 11 in (1.80 m)			Far Eastern
F	8	(Philippines)	Renato Lobo	6 ft 2 in (1.88 m)			Far Eastern
F/C	9	(Philippines)	Anthony Dasalla	6 ft 2 in (1.88 m)			Far Eastern
C	10	(Philippines)	Carlson Samlani	6 ft 5 in (1.96 m)			San Sebastian
F	11	(Philippines)	Jesus Migalbin	6 ft 3 in (1.91 m)			San Agustin
F	13	(Philippines)	Manny Paner	6 ft 3 in (1.91 m)			Visayas
F	13	(United States)	Herman Barnes (I)	6 ft 3 in (1.91 m)			UAB
G	14	(Philippines)	Joey Loyzaga	6 ft 1 in (1.85 m)			San Beda
G/F	15	(Philippines)	Dante Gonzalgo	6 ft 1 in (1.85 m)			Lyceum
C	16	(Philippines)	Noli Banate	6 ft 5 in (1.96 m)			Mindanao
F	17	(Philippines)	Evalson Valencia	6 ft 1 in (1.85 m)			Western Institute
F	24	(United States)	Floyd Hooper (I)	6 ft 3 in (1.91 m)			Loyola Marymount
F	44	(Philippines)	Rudy Distrito	5 ft 11 in (1.80 m)			UE
G	77	(Philippines)	Federico Lauchengco	6 ft 0 in (1.83 m)			Far Eastern

Coaches

Head coach

- (Philippines) Nat Canson

Assistant coach(es)

- (Philippines) Freddie Gonzales

Team manager

- (Philippines) Jose Ibazeta, Jr

Legend

- (C) Team captain
- (I) Import
- Injured

=== Additions ===
Player	Signed	Former team
Rudy Distrito	November 1984	Country Fair Hotdogs
