= Larry McNeill =

American basketball player

Personal information
- Born: January 31, 1951 Hoke County, North Carolina, U.S.
- Died: December 29, 2004 (aged 53)
- Listed height: 6 ft 8 in (2.03 m)
- Listed weight: 195 lb (88 kg)

Career information
- High school: Westinghouse (New York City, New York)
- College: Marquette (1971–1973)
- NBA draft: 1973: 2nd round, 25th overall pick
- Drafted by: Kansas City–Omaha Kings
- Playing career: 1973–1984
- Position: Power forward / center
- Number: 31, 43, 32

Career history
- 1973–1976: Kansas City–Omaha Kings
- 1976: New York Nets
- 1977: Wilkes-Barre Barons
- 1977: Golden State Warriors
- 1978: Buffalo Braves
- 1978–1979: Rochester Zeniths
- 1979: Detroit Pistons
- 1979: Gilbey's Gin
- 1979–1980: Utica Olympics
- 1980: Gilbey's Gin
- 1980–1981: Rochester Zeniths
- 1981: Gilbey's Gin
- 1981–1982: 1939 Canarias
- 1982: Gilbey's Gin
- 1982–1983: Rochester Zeniths
- 1983: Winston Kings
- 1983–1984: Toronto Tornados

Career highlights
- 2× CBA champion (1979, 1981); CBA Playoff/Finals MVP (1979); All-CBA First Team (1979); Spanish League Top Scorer (1982)

Career NBA statistics
- Points: 2,533 (8.5 ppg)
- Rebounds: 1,440 (4.8 rpg)
- Assists: 225 (0.8 apg)
- Stats at NBA.com
- Stats at Basketball Reference

Larry McNeill (January 31, 1951 – December 29, 2004) was an American National Basketball Association (NBA) player.

== College career ==
McNeill played at college basketball at Marquette University, with the Warriors.

== Professional career ==
McNeill was drafted in the second round of the 1973 NBA draft, by the Kansas City–Omaha Kings, and would play with the franchise until 1976. That year, he was traded to the New York Nets, for a third-round draft pick. In 1977, he signed as a free agent with the Golden State Warriors. The following two years, he signed as a free agent with the Buffalo Braves and Detroit Pistons.

McNeil also played in the Philippine Basketball Association for Gilbey's Gin from 1979 to 1982, and for the Winston Kings, where he scored a then record 88 points in one game, in 1983.

He also spent several seasons in the Continental Basketball Association with the Wilkes-Barre Barons, Utica Olympics, and Rochester Zeniths. He was selected as the CBA Playoff/Finals Most Valuable Player and named to the All-CBA First Team in 1979.

McNeill continues to hold the NBA record for the most field goals in a playoff game without a miss, going 12 for 12 in a playoff game in 1975, with the Kings.

== Career statistics ==
Legend
GP	Games played	GS	Games started	MPG	Minutes per game
FG%	Field goal percentage	3P%	3-point field goal percentage	FT%	Free throw percentage
RPG	Rebounds per game	APG	Assists per game	SPG	Steals per game
BPG	Blocks per game	PPG	Points per game	**Bold**	Career high

=== NBA ===
==== Regular season ====
Year	Team	GP	MPG	FG%	FT%	RPG	APG	SPG	BPG	PPG
1973–74	Kansas City–Omaha	54	9.6	.482	.707	2.7	.4	.6	.1	5.8
1974–75	Kansas City–Omaha	80	21.9	.459	.784	**6.2**	.9	**.9**	.3	9.8
1975–76	Kansas City	**82**	19.7	**.484**	.758	**6.2**	.9	.6	**.4**	9.7
1976–77	N.Y. Nets	8	11.6	.353	.800	3.3	.4	.5	.1	7.5
1976–77	Golden State	16	8.6	.475	.903	3.1	.2	.4	.1	5.4
1977–78	Golden State	9	7.4	.333	.789	1.6	.2	.0	.1	3.0
1977–78	Buffalo	37	**23.6**	.462	.833	5.1	**1.2**	.5	.3	**11.9**
1978–79	Detroit	11	4.2	.450	**.917**	.9	.3	.0	.0	2.6
Career		297	17.2	.466	.779	4.8	.8	.6	.3	8.5

==== Playoffs ====
Year	Team	GP	MPG	FG%	FT%	RPG	APG	SPG	BPG	PPG
1975	Kansas City–Omaha	**6**	**17.2**	.647	**.850**	**4.3**	**.3**	**.3**	**.3**	**10.2**
1977	Golden State	**6**	3.5	**.700**	.500	.3	.0	.2	.0	2.7
Career		12	10.3	.659	.792	2.3	.2	.3	.2	6.4
