= All-time Philippine Basketball Association team standings =

This is the all-time Philippine Basketball Association team standings, which includes all of the teams that participated. Standings are accurate as of the quarterfinal round of 2026 PBA Governors' Cup. Guest teams are listed below, may have participated at least one conference, but all teams here have played at least one conference in the PBA.

Key:
Active team
Disbanded team
Guest team, currently not in league.

Team	Played	Wins	Losses	Percentage	Seasons	Titles	Titles/season
(Hong Kong) Bay Area	24	17	7	70.8	1	0	0.000
Adidas/France	10	7	3	70	1	0	0.000
(Brazil) Emtex Sacronas	10	7	3	70	1	0	0.000
(United States) Nicholas Stoodley/USA	10	7	3	70	1	1	1.000
Crispa	589	403	186	68.4	10	13	1.300
Nicholas Stoodley/South Korea	6	4	2	66.7	1	0	0.000
Toyota	516	338	178	65.5	9	9	1.000
San Miguel/Royal/Gold Eagle/Magnolia/Petron	2,636	1,518	1,118	57.6	50	31	0.625
Alaska/Hills Bros.	1,828	997	831	54.5	35	14	0.400
TNT/Pepsi/7-Up/Mobiline/Talk 'N Text	1,692	924	768	54.6	35	11	0.333
(Hong Kong) Eastern	13	7	6	53.8	1	0	0.000
Galleon/CDCP	60	32	28	53.3	2	0	0.000
U/Tex	397	210	187	52.9	8	2	0.375
Magnolia/Purefoods/Coney Island/B-Meg Derby Ace/B-Meg/San Mig Coffee/San Mig Super Coffee/Star	1,879	989	893	52.6	37	14	0.424
Barangay Ginebra/Gilbey's Gin/St. George/Ginebra/Añejo/Tondeña/Gordon's Gin	2,310	1,200	1,110	51.9	46	16	0.348
Beer Hausen/Manila Beer	155	79	76	51	3	0	0.000
Pop Cola/Sarsi/Diet Sarsi/Swift/Sunkist	629	320	309	50.9	12	4	0.333
Meralco	623	314	309	50.4	15	1	0.077
Red Bull/Barako Bull/Barako Energy	515	258	257	50.1	11	3	0.273
Rain or Shine/Welcoat	823	403	420	49	19	2	0.133
Coca-Cola/Powerade	457	217	240	47.5	10	2	0.200
Converge	143	69	74	48.3	4	0	0.000
Tefilin	62	29	33	46.8	2	0	0.000
Great Taste/Presto/Tivoli/CFC/N-Rich	883	408	475	46.2	18	6	0.333
Tanduay	732	336	396	45.9	16	3	0.186
NLEX	369	169	200	45.8	11	0	0.000
Sta. Lucia	798	361	437	45.2	18	2	0.111
(Philippines) Northern Consolidated Cement/RP National Team/Centennial Team/Selecta-RP/Hapee-RP/Smart Gilas	181	81	100	44.8	8	1	0.125
Shell/Formula Shell	1,013	436	577	43	20	4	0.200
Barako Bull/FedEx/Air21/Burger King/Barako Bull	565	238	327	42.1	14	0	0.000
Phoenix Super LPG/Phoenix/Phoenix Pulse	311	125	186	40.2	10	0	0.000
Concepcion Carrier/Quasar/Fiberlite	70	26	44	37.1	2	0	0.000
NorthPort/GlobalPort	397	147	250	37	12	0	0.000
Filmanbank	89	32	57	36	2	0	0.000
Mariwasa/Noritake/Honda/Finance/Galerie Dominique	334	117	217	35	9	0	0.000
Air21/Shopinas.com	111	34	77	30.6	3	0	0.000
Ramrod/Australia	7	2	5	28.6	1	0	0.000
Seven-Up (original)	99	25	74	25.3	3	0	0.000
(Serbia) Novi Sad	4	1	3	25	1	0	0.000
Blackwater	329	82	247	24.9	11	0	0.000
Manhattan/Sunkist/Winston/Country Fair	63	15	48	23.8	2	0	0.000
Terrafirma/Kia/Mahindra/Columbian	327	77	250	23.5	11	0	0.000
Titan Ultra	35	8	27	22.9	1	0	0.000
Macau Black Knights/Giant Pandas	24	5	19	20.8	1	0	0.000
(China) Jilin Yi Qi Tigers	4	0	4	0	1	0	0.000
(South Korea) Yonsei University	4	0	4	0	1	0	0.000
(United States) U.S. Mail and More Pro-Am Selection	3	0	3	0	1	0	0.000
(Canada) University of British Columbia	3	0	3	0	1	0	0.000
