= Melo Lim =

Filipino basketball coach

NLEX Road Warriors
- Position: Assistant coach
- League: PBA

Career information
- College: San Beda
- Coaching career: 2018–present

Career history

Coaching
- 2018–2019: Perpetual (assistant)
- 2023–present: NLEX Road Warriors (assistant)

Career highlights
- 5× NCAA seniors' champion (2007, 2008, 2010, 2011, 2012)

Carmelo "Melo" Lim is a Filipino coach and former collegiate player who is currently serving as an assistant coach for NLEX Road Warriors since 2023. He is the son of former collegiate champion coach Frankie Lim.

== Basketball career ==
=== Playing ===
Lim played for San Beda Red Lions under the tutelage of his father. Melo played his final year without his father, as the latter was suspended by NCAA committee for 2 years due to an altercation with San Sebastian volleyball coach Roger Gorayeb. The same year, they won their third straight championship.

Melo graduated in San Beda in 2013 together with Jake Pascual and Anjo Caram.

=== Coaching ===
He served as an assistant to his father at Perpetual Altas, and later on NLEX Road Warriors. Even his father was dismissed, he was retained by the NLEX management.

== Personal life ==
He is the second youngest son of Frankie Lim and wife Olen.
