= 1984 Gilbey's Gin Tonics season =

- Head coach: Arturo Valenzona
- Owner(s): La Tondeña Incorporada

1st All Filipino Conference results
- Record: 15–14 (51.7%)
- Place: 2nd
- Playoff finish: Finals (lost to Crispa)

2nd All Filipino Conference results
- Record: 7–7 (50%)
- Place: 6th
- Playoff finish: Quarterfinals

Invitational Conference results
- Record: 3–9 (25%)
- Place: 4th
- Playoff finish: N/A

Gilbey's Gin Tonics seasons

The 1984 Gilbey's Gin Tonics season was the 6th season of the franchise in the Philippine Basketball Association (PBA).

== Transactions ==
Players Added	Signed	Former team
Robert Jaworski	Off-season	Toyota (disbanded)
Francis Arnaiz	Off-season	Toyota (disbanded)
Joey Marquez	Off-season	Great Taste
Romulo Mamaril	Off-season	Winston

== Occurrences ==
In early 1984, when the multi-titled popular ballclub Toyota Super Corollas started their disbandment procedures. Gilbey's Gin team owner and PBA president Carlos "Honeyboy" Palanca apparently had already expressed his desire to enlist the services of Robert "the Big J" Jaworski. Toyota team manager Jack Rodriguez, however, said that all player contracts of the Super Corollas were sold by management to Beer Hausen, including the Big J. In a shocking revelation, league officials, led by PBA commissioner Mariano Yenko and his legal counsel Atty. Rodrigo Salud, bared that Jaworski's contract was not really acquired by Shareholdings Inc. the holding company of Beer Hausen and the one that bought the Toyota franchise, and that Big J was committed to play for Gilbey's Gin. Jaworski, along with three other Toyota players namely; Francis Arnaiz, Chito Loyzaga and Arnie Tuadles, refused to play for Beer Hausen. In an official statement, Gilbey's owner Carlos Palanca said they will be able to accommodate Francis Arnaiz, but have to drop Loyzaga and Tuadles, because the team already has a complete backcourt lineup.

== Finals stint ==
Gilbey's defeated newcomer Beer Hausen in a playoff game on July 5 to enter the finals against defending champion Crispa, their last year's finals opponent in the same conference. The Gin Tonics placed runner-up to Crispa Redmanizers in the first of the two All-Filipino conferences of the year, losing 1-4 in the best-of-seven finals series.

== Win–loss records vs opponents ==
Teams	Win	Loss	1st All-Filipino	2nd All-Filipino	3rd (Invitational)
Beer Hausen	6	7	3-3	1-0	2-4
Country Fair	3	0	2-0	1-0	N/A
Crispa Redmanizers	3	10	2-7	1-1	0-2
Gold Eagle Beer	4	3	2-1	1-1	1-1
Great Taste Coffee	4	2	3-0	1-0	0-2
Northern (NCC)	1	5	1-3	0-2	N/A
Tanduay Rhum	4	3	2-0	2-3	N/A
Total	25	30	15-14	7-7	3-9

== Roster ==
1984 Gilbey's Gin Tonics roster
Players

Pos.	#	POB	Name	Height	Weight	DOB (YYYY–MM–DD)	From
F	1 & 10	(United States)	Tony Washam (I)	6 ft 3 in (1.91 m)			Virginia
F	5	(Philippines)	Steve Watson	6 ft 2 in (1.88 m)			Ateneo
G	6	(Philippines)	Conrado Pasco	6 ft 1 in (1.85 m)			Far Eastern
G	7	(Philippines)	Robert Jaworski	6 ft 1 in (1.85 m)			UE
G	8	(Philippines)	Francis Arnaiz	5 ft 11 in (1.80 m)			Ateneo
C	10	(Philippines)	Eduardo Ducut	6 ft 5 in (1.96 m)			Letran
G	11	(Philippines)	Gary Vargas	6 ft 1 in (1.85 m)			PSBA
F	13	(Philippines)	Antero Saldaña	6 ft 3 in (1.91 m)			Letran
C	14	(Philippines)	Romulo Mamaril	6 ft 6 in (1.98 m)			Mapúa
G	15	(Philippines)	Alex Clarino	6 ft 1 in (1.85 m)			Lyceum
F	17	(Philippines)	Joseph Herrera	6 ft 0 in (1.83 m)			Letran
F	20	(Philippines)	Rolando Buhay	6 ft 3 in (1.91 m)			NCBA
G	24	(Philippines)	Willie Generalao	5 ft 8 in (1.73 m)			Visayas
G/F	66	(Philippines)	Joey Marquez	6 ft 1 in (1.85 m)			Angeles

Coaches

Head coach

- (Philippines) Arturo Valenzona

Assistant coach(es)

- (Philippines) Guillermo Afable

Team manager

- (Philippines) Adolf Ferrer

Legend

- (C) Team captain
- (I) Import
- Injured

=== Subtraction ===
Player	Number	Position	Height	New Team
Marlowe Jacutin	4	Forward	6 ft 0 in (1.83 m)	Country Fair Hotdogs
