= 1983 Winston Kings season =

- Head coach: Nic Jorge; Glenn McDonald; Lauro Mumar
- Owners: Sanyu Group; Fortune Tobacco, Inc.

All-Filipino Conference results
- Record: 2–5 (28.6%)
- Place: 7th
- Playoff finish: N/A

Reinforced Conference results
- Record: 6–9 (40%)
- Place: 7th
- Playoff finish: N/A

Open Conference results
- Record: 5–9 (35.7%)
- Place: 8th
- Playoff finish: N/A

Winston Kings seasons

The 1983 Winston Kings season was the 1st season of the franchise in the Philippine Basketball Association (PBA). Known as Manhattan Shirtmakers in the All-Filipino Conference and Sunkist Juice Lovers in the Reinforced Conference.

== Summary ==
The Sanyu Group of Companies, the league's newest member who took over from the defunct U-Tex Wranglers, carried its product line Manhattan Shirts of New York and were called Manhattan Shirtmakers with the Hong Kong-based Manhattan Far East subsidizing the team's training expenses. Its line-up were composed of 10 veterans and two rookies and will be handled by coach Nic Jorge. The team did not qualify in the semifinal round of the All-Filipino Conference, placing seventh in their inaugural tournament.

The team was renamed Sunkist Juice Lovers in the Second Conference. Coach Nic Jorge was replaced by former U-Tex import Glenn McDonald, who saw action for two games before resuming to full-time coaching. McDonald he gave his spot to one-time CDCP import Ronald McCoy, who only played one game and was replaced by Maurice Williams, a seventh-round draft pick by the Los Angeles Lakers. The Juice Lovers were tied with San Miguel with six wins and eight losses after the eliminations. They lost to the Beermen in a playoff game for the last quarterfinals berth.

Fortune Tobacco Corporation took over from the Sanyu Group in the Open Conference and carried the name Winston Kings, now coached by basketball great Lauro Mumar. The Kings started out with the returning Darryl Smith, who played for Great Taste back in 1979, and Eddie Roberson as their imports. After two games, both were replaced by former Gilbey's Gin import Larry McNeill and Maurice Williams, who was called back after playing 12 games with Sunkist in the previous conference. Winston ended up last with five wins and nine losses with one of their victories best remembered for the scoring record made by Larry McNeill, hitting 88 points against Great Taste.

== Scoring record ==
October 25: Larry McNeill set an all-time high for most points in the game by scoring 88 points in Winston' 167-163 overtime victory over Great Taste. The 88-point total output broke the previous record of 85 made by Lew Massey of Gilbey's a year before.

== Won-loss records vs Opponents ==
Team	Win	Loss	1st (All-Filipino)	2nd (Reinforced)	3rd (Open)
Crispa	0	5	0-1	0-2	0-2
Galerie Dominique	2	3	0-1	2-0	0-2
Gilbey’s Gin	3	2	0-1	1-1	2-0
Great Taste	1	4	0-1	0-2	1-1
San Miguel	3	3	1-0	2-1	0-2
Tanduay	2	3	1-0	0-2	1-1
Toyota	2	3	0-1	1-1	1-1
Total	13	23	2-5	6-9	5-9

== Roster ==
=== All-Filipino & Reinforced Conference ===
Manhattan / Sunkist roster
Players
Coaches

Pos.	No.	Nat.	Name	Ht.	Wt.
G	6	(Philippines)	Albert Ortiz	6 ft 0 in (1.83 m)	170 lb (77 kg)	Philippines
F/C	8	(Philippines)	Noli Banate	6 ft 5 in (1.96 m)	180 lb (82 kg)	Mindanao
F/C	10	(Philippines)	Armando Arce	6 ft 3 in (1.91 m)	180 lb (82 kg)
G	12	(Philippines)	Yoyong Martirez	5 ft 8 in (1.73 m)	160 lb (73 kg)	Southwestern-U
F	13	(Philippines)	Romulo Palijo (AF)	6 ft 0 in (1.83 m)	190 lb (86 kg)	PSBA
G	14	(Philippines)	Rudy Distrito	5 ft 11 in (1.80 m)	165 lb (75 kg)	UE
G/F	15	(Philippines)	Woodrow Jaymalin (AF)	5 ft 10 in (1.78 m)	157 lb (71 kg)	Philippine Christian
C	16	(Philippines)	Romulo Mamaril (A)	6 ft 6 in (1.98 m)	165 lb (75 kg)	Mapúa
F	17	(Philippines)	Evalson Valencia	6 ft 1 in (1.85 m)	175 lb (79 kg)	Western Institute
F	23	(Philippines)	Salvador Ramas	6 ft 1 in (1.85 m)	180 lb (82 kg)	Cebu
F	24	(Philippines)	Caesar Yabut	6 ft 2 in (1.88 m)	170 lb (77 kg)	Mapúa
F	27	(Philippines)	Nilo Cruz	6 ft 2 in (1.88 m)	170 lb (77 kg)
C	33	(Philippines)	Mario Basco (AF)	6 ft 4 in (1.93 m)	197 lb (89 kg)	San Sebastian
G	34	(Philippines)	Allan Abelgas	5 ft 9 in (1.75 m)	140 lb (64 kg)	USJ–R
G	40	(Philippines)	Alex Tan	6 ft 1 in (1.85 m)	150 lb (68 kg)	UE
G	20	(United States)	Glenn McDonald (I)	6 ft 6 in (1.98 m)	190 lb (86 kg)	Long Beach State
C	20	(United States)	Ronald McCoy (I)	6 ft 5 in (1.96 m)	200 lb (91 kg)	Western Washington
G/F	21	(United States)	Maurice Williams (I)	6 ft 5 in (1.96 m)	185 lb (84 kg)	USC

Head coach

- (Philippines) Nic Jorge
- (United States) Glenn McDonald

Assistant coach(es)

- (Philippines) Alfonso Rodriguez

Legend

- (C) Team captain
- (I) Import
  - (AF) Played only in AFC
  - (A) Acquired from Crispa
- Injured

=== Open Conference ===
Winston Kings roster
Players
Coaches

Pos.	No.	Nat.	Name	Ht.	Wt.
G	6	(Philippines)	Albert Ortiz	6 ft 0 in (1.83 m)	170 lb (77 kg)	Philippines
F/C	8	(Philippines)	Noli Banate	6 ft 5 in (1.96 m)	180 lb (82 kg)	Mindanao
F/C	10	(Philippines)	Armando Arce	6 ft 3 in (1.91 m)	180 lb (82 kg)
G	12	(Philippines)	Yoyong Martirez	5 ft 8 in (1.73 m)	160 lb (73 kg)	Southwestern-U
G	14	(Philippines)	Rudy Distrito	5 ft 11 in (1.80 m)	165 lb (75 kg)	UE
F	15	(Philippines)	Rodolfo Segura	6 ft 2 in (1.88 m)	155 lb (70 kg)	Adamson
C	16	(Philippines)	Romulo Mamaril	6 ft 6 in (1.98 m)	165 lb (75 kg)	Mapúa
F	17	(Philippines)	Evalson Valencia	6 ft 1 in (1.85 m)	175 lb (79 kg)	Western Institute
F	23	(Philippines)	Salvador Ramas	6 ft 1 in (1.85 m)	180 lb (82 kg)	Cebu
F	24	(Philippines)	Caesar Yabut	6 ft 2 in (1.88 m)	170 lb (77 kg)	Mapúa
F	27	(Philippines)	Nilo Cruz	6 ft 2 in (1.88 m)	170 lb (77 kg)
G	34	(Philippines)	Allan Abelgas	5 ft 9 in (1.75 m)	140 lb (64 kg)	USJ–R
G	40	(Philippines)	Alex Tan	6 ft 1 in (1.85 m)	150 lb (68 kg)	UE
C	31	(United States)	Larry McNeill (I)	6 ft 9 in (2.06 m)	195 lb (88 kg)	Marquette
C	24 & 28	(United States)	Darryl Smith (I)	6 ft 8 in (2.03 m)	210 lb (95 kg)	USC
F	00	(United States)	Eddie Roberson (I)	6 ft 8 in (2.03 m)	215 lb (98 kg)	UNLV
G/F	21	(United States)	Maurice Williams (I)	6 ft 5 in (1.96 m)	185 lb (84 kg)	USC

Head coach

- (Philippines) Lauro Mumar

Assistant coach(es)

- (Philippines) Alfonso Rodriguez

Legend

- (C) Team captain
- (I) Import
- Injured

_{Team Manager: Pablito Bermundo}
