= 1984 Tanduay Rhum Makers season =

- Head coach: Renato Reyes; Orly Castelo
- General Manager: Johnny Jose
- Owner(s): Elizalde & Co.

1st All Filipino Conference results
- Record: 3–11 (21.4%)
- Place: 7th
- Playoff finish: N/A

2nd All Filipino Conference results
- Record: 11–15 (42.3%)
- Place: 3rd
- Playoff finish: Semifinals

Invitational Conference results
- Record: 0–0
- Place: N/A
- Playoff finish: N/A

Tanduay Rhum Makers seasons

The 1984 Tanduay Rhum Makers season was the 10th season of the franchise in the Philippine Basketball Association (PBA).

== Transactions ==
Players Added	Signed	Former team
Dennis Abbatuan ^{Rookie}	Off-season	N/A
Allan Abelgas	Off-season	Winston
Ronnie Albor	Off-season	N-Rich (1982)
Rodolfo Lalota	Off-season	San Miguel
Eduardo Mendoza	Off-season	Great Taste
Leonardo Paguntalan	Off-season	Great Taste
Antonio Torrente	Off-season	Galerie Dominique
Tito Varela	Off-season	Crispa

== Occurrences ==
During the quarterfinal series against Gilbey's in the second conference, Orly Castelo, the San Sebastian College (SSC) coach in the NCAA, took over the team temporarily when regular coach Sonny Reyes had to leave on an important two-week business trip to Tokyo, Castelo steered Tanduay in the semifinal round by winning over the Gin Tonics.

== Scoring record ==
October 30: Game 2 of the battle for third place between Tanduay and Northern Consolidated (NCC), rookie Dennis Abbatuan scored a personal-high 51 points in the Rhum Makers' 127–95 victory over NCC for a 2–0 lead in their best-of-five series for third.

== Won-loss records vs Opponents ==
Teams	Win	Loss	1st All-Filipino	2nd All-Filipino
Beer Hausen	1	5	0–2	1–3
Country Fair	4	0	2–0	2–0
Crispa	2	4	0–2	2–2
Gilbey’s Gin	3	4	0–2	3–2
Gold Eagle	1	2	1–1	0–1
Great Taste	1	5	0–2	1–3
Northern (NCC)	2	6	0–2	2–4
Total	14	26	3–11	11–15

== Roster ==
Tanduay Rhum Makers roster
Players
Coaches

Pos.	No.	Nat.	Name	Ht.	Wt.
G	7	(Philippines)	Antonio Torrente	6 ft 1 in (1.85 m)
G/F	8	(Philippines)	Leonardo Paguntalan	6 ft 1 in (1.85 m)		Western Institute
F/C	9	(Philippines)	Rodolfo Lalota	6 ft 3 in (1.91 m)		Mapúa
F	10	(Philippines)	Zaldy Latoza	6 ft 2 in (1.88 m)		TUA
F	12	(Philippines)	Reynaldo Lazaro	6 ft 2 in (1.88 m)		Far Eastern
G	14	(Philippines)	Jerry Pingoy	5 ft 10 in (1.78 m)		Visayas
F/C	15	(Philippines)	Ely Capacio	6 ft 4 in (1.93 m)
F	16	(Philippines)	Ronnie Albor	6 ft 2 in (1.88 m)		Southwestern-U
F	18 & 25	(Philippines)	Dennis Abbatuan	6 ft 2 in (1.88 m)		José Rizal
F	24	(Philippines)	Jose Yango	6 ft 3 in (1.91 m)		San Beda
G	32	(Philippines)	Tito Varela	6 ft 1 in (1.85 m)		UE
G	34	(Philippines)	Allan Abelgas	5 ft 10 in (1.78 m)		USJ–R
G	40	(Philippines)	Alex Tan	6 ft 0 in (1.83 m)		UE

Head coach

- (Philippines) Orly Castelo

Assistant coach(es)

- (Philippines) Elias Tolentino

Team manager

- (Philippines) Johnny Jose

Legend

- (C) Team captain
- Injured

=== Trades ===
September 1984	To Country Fair Hotdogs Eduardo Mendoza	To Tanduay Rhum Makers Alex Tan
