= 1984 Crispa Redmanizers season =

- Head coach: Tommy Manotoc; Narciso Bernardo
- Owner(s): P. Floro and Sons, Inc.

1st All Filipino Conference results
- Record: 19–7 (73.1%)
- Place: 1st
- Playoff finish: Champions

2nd All Filipino Conference results
- Record: 11–11 (50%)
- Place: 5th
- Playoff finish: Semifinals

Invitational Conference results
- Record: 8–5 (61.5%)
- Place: 2nd
- Playoff finish: Finals (lost to Great Taste)

Crispa Redmanizers seasons

The 1984 Crispa Redmanizers season was the 10th and final season of the franchise in the Philippine Basketball Association (PBA).

== Colors ==
Crispa Redmanizers
(dark)
(light)

== Transactions ==
Players Added	Signed	Former team
Jaime Javier ^{Re-acquired, last played for Crispa in 1981}	Off-season	Galerie Dominique (disbanded)
Willie Pearson ^{Rookie}	Off-season	N/A
Lim Eng Beng	Off-season	San Miguel Beer
Matthew Gaston	Off-season	San Miguel Beer
Tito Varela ^{Re-acquired in the Invitational Conference where Tanduay didn't qualify to participate}	November 1984	Tanduay Rhum Makers

== Milestone ==
Fortunato "Atoy" Co became the first PBA player to score 10,000 points by tallying 32 markers in Crispa's 107-111 loss to Northern Consolidated.(NCC) on May 1.

== Occurrences ==
On July 1, Crispa coach Tommy Manotoc, citing health reasons, resigns after leading the Redmanizers to the All-Filipino Conference finals by winning over Northern (NCC), 96-94. Assistant coach Narciso Bernardo takes over as Crispa's head mentor.

== 13th PBA title ==
The Crispa Redmanizers captured their 13th and final PBA crown by winning the First All-Filipino Conference title over Gilbey's Gin, four games to one. Coach Narciso Bernardo won his first title with the Redmanizers.

== Last finals stint ==
The Redmanizers return to the finals in the Invitational Championship. Crispa played Great Taste in the best-of-five finale. The Redmanizers lost Game one by a rout, but won the next two games to move within a win of capturing another title. The Coffee Makers came back with a victory in Game four to tie the series and force a deciding fifth game.

On December 18, the Redmanizers trailed by as many as 28 points in the final quarter of Game five and lost to Great Taste, 106-127, in what turn out to be the final game of the winningest ballclub in the league.

== Win–loss records vs opponents ==
Teams	Win	Loss	1st All-Filipino	2nd All-Filipino	3rd (Invitational)
Beer Hausen	7	3	2-2	3-1	2-0
Country Fair	4	0	2-0	2-0	N/A
Gilbey's Gin	10	3	7-2	1-1	2-0
Gold Eagle Beer	7	0	2-0	3-0	2-0
Great Taste Coffee	4	10	2-1	0-4	2-5
Northern (NCC)	2	5	2-2	0-3	N/A
Tanduay Rhum	4	2	2-0	2-2	N/A
Total	38	23	19-7	11-11	8-5

== Roster ==
Crispa Redmanizers roster
Players
Coaches

Pos.	No.	Nat.	Name	Ht.	Wt.
F/C	5	(Philippines)	Abet Guidaben	6 ft 5 in (1.96 m)		USJ–R
G	6	(Philippines)	Fortunato Co, Jr	6 ft 1 in (1.85 m)		Mapúa
G/F	7	(Philippines)	Arturo Cristobal	6 ft 1 in (1.85 m)		Far Eastern
G/F	9	(Philippines)	Padim Israel	6 ft 3 in (1.91 m)		Ateneo
F	10	(Philippines)	Freddie Hubalde	6 ft 1 in (1.85 m)		Mapúa
G	11	(United States)	William Pearson	6 ft 2 in (1.88 m)		Chaminade
F/C	12	(Philippines)	Elpidio Villamin	6 ft 2 in (1.88 m)
G	14	(Philippines)	Matthew Gaston	6 ft 1 in (1.85 m)		Ateneo
G	15	(Philippines)	Bernie Fabiosa	5 ft 9 in (1.75 m)		UE
G	17	(Philippines)	Lim Eng Beng	5 ft 11 in (1.80 m)		De La Salle
F/C	18	(Philippines)	Philip Cezar	6 ft 3 in (1.91 m)		José Rizal
G/F	22	(United States)	Herman Barnes (I)	6 ft 3 in (1.91 m)		UAB
G/F	22	(United States)	Carlton Willis (I)	6 ft 3 in (1.91 m)		Overbrook HS (PA)
C	25	(Philippines)	Jaime Javier	6 ft 5 in (1.96 m)		José Rizal
G	33	(Philippines)	Tito Varela	6 ft 1 in (1.85 m)		UE

Head coach

- (Philippines) Tommy Manotoc
- (Philippines) Narciso Bernardo

Assistant coach(es)

Team manager

- (Philippines) Danny Floro

Legend

- (C) Team captain
- (I) Import
- Injured
