= 1983 Galerie Dominique Artists season =

- Head coach: Valentin Eduque; Cholo Martin; Alejandrito Miego

All Filipino Conference results
- Record: 1–6 (14.3%)
- Place: 8th
- Playoff finish: N/A

Reinforced Conference results
- Record: 2–12 (14.3%)
- Place: 8th
- Playoff finish: N/A

Open Conference results
- Record: 7–10 (41.2%)
- Place: 6th
- Playoff finish: Quarterfinals

Galerie Dominique Artists seasons

The 1983 Galerie Dominique Artists season was the 9th and final season of the franchise in the Philippine Basketball Association (PBA).

== Transactions ==
Players Added	Signed	Former team
Danny Florencio	Off-season	Toyota
Eduardo Merced	Off-season	Toyota
Gregorio Dionisio	Off-season	U-Tex (disbanded)
Jaime Taguines	Off-season	U-Tex (disbanded)
Marty Tierra	Off-season	U-Tex (disbanded)
Ricardo Mariano	Off-season	N-Rich
Rodolfo Soriano ^{Comebacking player}	Off-season	Crispa (1980)

== Occurrences ==
Days before the start of the four-team quarterfinal round in the Open Conference, Galerie Dominique team owner and manager Nikki Coseteng formally asked the PBA for some assistance to be able to play in the quarterfinals. It was reported the team was not paying the salaries of imports Larry Fogle and Don Robinson, who both threatened not to play. Galerie Dominique was on the verge of a financial collapse and the PBA earlier had second thoughts of aiding the embattled ballclub. But in a last-minute, the PBA board voted in favor of giving financial assistance to the beleaguered ballclub, thus Fogle and Robinson were able to play for the Artists.

== Won-loss records vs Opponents ==
Team	Win	Loss	1st (All-Filipino)	2nd (Reinforced)	3rd (Open)
Crispa	1	4	0–1	1-1	0–2
Gilbey's Gin	1	5	0–1	0–2	1–2
Great Taste	1	4	0–1	0–2	1-1
San Miguel	1	5	0–1	0–2	1–2
Tanduay	2	4	0–1	1-1	1–2
Toyota	1	4	0–1	0–2	1-1
Manhattan/Sunkist/Winston	3	2	1-0	0–2	2-0
Total	10	28	1–6	2–12	7–10

== Roster ==
Galerie Dominique roster
Players
Coaches

Pos.	No.	Nat.	Name	Ht.	Wt.
G	7	(Philippines)	Antonio Torrente	6 ft 1 in (1.85 m)	167 lb (76 kg)
G/F	8	(Philippines)	Ricardo Mariano	6 ft 0 in (1.83 m)	187 lb (85 kg)	Mapúa
G/F	28 & 8	(Philippines)	Danny Florencio	5 ft 10 in (1.78 m)	165 lb (75 kg)	UST
G	9	(Philippines)	Gregorio Dionisio	5 ft 10 in (1.78 m)	182 lb (83 kg)	Adamson
C	10	(Philippines)	Jaime Javier	6 ft 4 in (1.93 m)	185 lb (84 kg)	José Rizal
F	11	(Philippines)	Rodolfo Soriano	6 ft 2 in (1.88 m)	180 lb (82 kg)	UE
G	12	(Philippines)	Eduardo Merced	6 ft 0 in (1.83 m)	150 lb (68 kg)	José Rizal
G	15	(Philippines)	Marty Tierra	5 ft 11 in (1.80 m)	165 lb (75 kg)	José Rizal
G/F	17	(Philippines)	Roberto Poblete	6 ft 3 in (1.91 m)	170 lb (77 kg)	Adamson
G	3 & 20	(Philippines)	Oliveros Dalman	6 ft 3 in (1.91 m)	167 lb (76 kg)	Visayas
G	22	(Philippines)	Francisco Natividad	6 ft 1 in (1.85 m)	156 lb (71 kg)	UST
F	26	(Philippines)	Woodrow Balani	6 ft 3 in (1.91 m)	153 lb (69 kg)	Visayas
C	44	(Philippines)	Jaime Taguines	6 ft 5 in (1.96 m)	175 lb (79 kg)	Holy Angel
C	45	(Philippines)	Redentor Vicente	6 ft 5 in (1.96 m)	165 lb (75 kg)	José Rizal
F	64	(Philippines)	Monico Martinez	6 ft 2 in (1.88 m)	170 lb (77 kg)	PSBA
F/C	40	(United States)	Larry Fogle (I)	6 ft 5 in (1.96 m)	208 lb (94 kg)	Canisius
C	0	(United States)	Don Robinson (I)	6 ft 10 in (2.08 m)	210 lb (95 kg)	Nevada

Head coach

- (Philippines) Tito Eduque
- (Philippines) Cholo Martin
- (Philippines) Alejandrito Miego

Assistant coach(es)

Legend

- (C) Team captain
- (I) Import
- Injured

_{Team Manager: Nikki Coseteng}
