= 1983 Toyota Silver Coronas season =

1983 Toyota Super Corollas season
- Head coach: Edgardo Ocampo
- Owner: Delta Motor Corporation

All-Filipino Conference results
- Record: 5–8 (38.5%)
- Place: 4th
- Playoff finish: Semifinals

Reinforced Conference results
- Record: 7–10 (41.2%)
- Place: 6th
- Playoff finish: Quarterfinals

Open Conference results
- Record: 6–9 (40%)
- Place: 7th
- Playoff finish: N/A

Toyota Super Corollas seasons

The 1983 Toyota Silver Coronas season was the ninth and final season of the franchise in the Philippine Basketball Association (PBA). Return to Toyota Super Corollas in the Open Conference. The team would disband in February 1984 and its PBA franchise was sold to the Lucio Tan group of companies.

== Colors ==
(dark)
(light)

== Summary ==
Toyota defeated Crispa, 86–84, in the main game of the season's first Conference on March 6, the All-Filipino, which was shelved for two years as the Silver Coronas spoiled Tommy Manotoc's debut as coach of the Redmanizers. Toyota had a 4–3 won-loss slate after the one-round eliminations, they did not win a single match in the short semifinal round and placed fourth behind Great Taste Discoverers.

Kevin Porter, an outstanding former Washington Bullet quarterback, was Toyota's import in the Reinforced Filipino Conference. After scoring 50 points in his debut in the 135–141 Toyota loss to Tanduay on May 17, Porter went into a slump before leaving the Silver Coronas after eight games. Former U/tex import Julius Wayne came in to replace Porter. The Silver Coronas had seven wins against seven defeats after the eliminations and lost all their quarterfinal matches and were eliminated.

In the Open Conference, former best import awardee Andrew Fields is back with Toyota in his fifth PBA season. The Super Corollas are allowed to field in one import at the time and Toyota's other import was newcomer Ralph Brewster. The Super Corollas played without Ramon Fernandez, Sonny Jaworski and Francis Arnaiz when they beat an off-form Crispa, 102–93, in both teams' first game on August 30 with the Redmanizers still showing signs of their championship hangover and failed to cash on their two-import edge. After overpowering Great Taste in their second outing, they lost their next four assignments, starting with Galerie Dominique's 108–104 upset win and consecutive defeats to Tanduay, Gilbey's and Winston. Going into their last two games in the eliminations, the Super Corollas were coming off a two-game winning streak and a 136–130 triple-overtime win against Gilbey's on October 20 when they were beaten by San Miguel Beermen in overtime, 117–122 on October 23. The Tanduay Rhum Makers forced a knockout game with Toyota four nights later by winning over the Super Corollas, 131–119. Both teams finished with identical six wins and eight losses.

On October 30, Toyota seemed headed into the quarterfinal round as they led most of the way in the playoff match, but the Rhum Makers suddenly came alive in the final quarter and escaped with a 111–110 win. Tanduay import George Melton partially blocked Ramon Fernandez's final attempt with four seconds left to preserve the victory.

== Occurrences ==
After being booted out for the second straight conference and suffered their worst finish, seventh in the Open Conference, the Toyota Super Corollas were nearly resurrected as a team with a possible stint in the quarterfinal round when an internal problem surfaced over at the Galerie Dominique camp, the surprise team who made it to the quarterfinals. It was suggested the Super Corollas instead take the place of Galerie Dominique. The Toyota management seemed to be receptive, especially after coming off from a sorry playoff loss to Tanduay, but the jubilation for Toyota fans was short-lived as the PBA board voted in favor of giving financial assistance to the Artists.

On the same day the PBA had its board meeting, the Toyota management called for a top-level meeting to discuss the possible disbandment of the team due to financial problems within their parent company Delta Motor Corporation.

== Won-loss records vs Opponents ==
Team	Win	Loss	1st (All-Filipino)	2nd (Reinforced)	3rd (Open)
Crispa	2	4	1-1	0–2	1-1
Galerie Dominique	4	1	1-0	2-0	1-1
Gilbey's Gin	2	5	0–2	1–2	1-1
Great Taste	4	5	2–3	1-1	1-1
San Miguel	2	4	0–1	1–2	1-1
Tanduay	1	6	0–1	1–2	0–3
Manhattan/Sunkist/Winston	3	2	1-0	1-1	1-1
Total	18	27	5–8	7–10	6–9

== Roster ==
Toyota Silver Coronas roster
Players
Coaches

Pos.	No.	Nat.	Name	Ht.	Wt.
G/F	4	(Philippines)	Chito Loyzaga	6 ft 2 in (1.88 m)	210 lb (95 kg)	San Beda
F/C	6	(Philippines)	Abe King	6 ft 3 in (1.91 m)	187 lb (85 kg)	San Beda
G	7	(Philippines)	Robert Jaworski	6 ft 0 in (1.83 m)	180 lb (82 kg)	UE
G	8	(Philippines)	Francis Arnaiz	5 ft 10 in (1.78 m)	160 lb (73 kg)	Ateneo
F/C	10	(Philippines)	Ramon Fernandez	6 ft 4 in (1.93 m)	162 lb (73 kg)	San Carlos
G/F	11	(Philippines)	Arnie Tuadles	6 ft 2 in (1.88 m)	170 lb (77 kg)	Visayas
G/F	13	(Philippines)	Timoteo Coloso	6 ft 2 in (1.88 m)	175 lb (79 kg)	Letran
F/C	14	(Philippines)	Leopoldo Herrera	6 ft 2 in (1.88 m)	170 lb (77 kg)	Wesleyan Philippines
F/C	15	(Philippines)	Ricky Relosa	6 ft 4 in (1.93 m)	192 lb (87 kg)	Mapúa
F	18	(Philippines)	Emerito Legaspi	5 ft 11 in (1.80 m)	150 lb (68 kg)	UE
F	20	(Philippines)	Nicanor Bulaong	6 ft 3 in (1.91 m)	164 lb (74 kg)	Far Eastern
F/C	88	(Philippines)	Edgardo Cordero	6 ft 4 in (1.93 m)	175 lb (79 kg)	UST
G	2	(United States)	Kevin Porter (I)	6 ft 0 in (1.83 m)	150 lb (68 kg)	Saint Francis College
G/F	3	(United States)	Julius Wayne (I)	6 ft 1 in (1.85 m)	176 lb (80 kg)	Texas-El Paso
C	1	(United States)	Andrew Fields (I)	6 ft 8 in (2.03 m)	200 lb (91 kg)	Cheyney
C	34	(United States)	Ralph Brewster (I)	6 ft 8 in (2.03 m)	215 lb (98 kg)	Texas Tech University

Head coach

- (Philippines) Edgardo Ocampo

Assistant coach(es)

- (Philippines) Rino Salazar

Legend

- (C) Team captain
- (I) Import
- Injured

_{Team Manager: Jack Rodriguez / Ricardo Silverio Jr}
