= 1984 PBA season =

10th PBA season

- Duration: March 25 – December 18, 1984
- Teams: 7 + 1
- TV partner: Vintage Sports (MBS)
- Season MVP: Ramon Fernandez (Beer Hausen Brewmasters)
- First All-Filipino Conference champions: Crispa Redmanizers
- First All-Filipino Conference runners-up: Gilbey's Gin Tonics
- Second All-Filipino Conference champions: Great Taste Coffee Makers
- Second All-Filipino Conference runners-up: Beer Hausen Brewmasters
- Invitational Championship champions: Great Taste Coffee Makers
- Invitational Championship runners-up: Crispa Redmanizers

Seasons
- ← 1983 1985 →

The 1984 PBA season was the 10th season of the Philippine Basketball Association (PBA).

== Board of governors ==
=== Executive committee ===
- Mariano A. Yenko, Jr. (Commissioner)
- Tomas L. Manotoc (Deputy Commissioner)
- Carlos Palanca III (President, representing Gilbey's Gin Tonics)
- Jose Ibazeta, Jr. (Vice-President and Treasurer, representing Gold Eagle Beermen)

=== Teams ===
| Team | Company | Governor |
|---|---|---|
| Beer Hausen Brewmasters | Shareholdings Inc. | Andrew H. Jao |
| Country Fair Hotdogs | Sanyu Group of Companies | Pablito L. Bermudo |
| Crispa Redmanizers | P. Floro and Sons | Narciso Bernardo |
| Gilbey's Gin Tonics | La Tondeña Incorporada | Carlos Palanca III |
| Great Taste Coffee Makers | Consolidated Foods Corporation | Quirino Marquinez |
| Gold Eagle Beermen | San Miguel Corporation | Nazario Avendaño |
| Tanduay Rhum Makers | Elizalde & Company; Tanduay Distillers, Inc. | Johnny Jose |

== Season highlights ==
- The season marked the first without the multi-titled Toyota as the ballclub disbanded at the start of the year and sold its franchise to Asia Brewery, which played their first season under the name of Beer Hausen.
- The NCC basketball team, the national training team coached by Ron Jacobs, played in the first two conferences as guest team.
- The PBA was forced to have two All-Filipino Conferences as the nation reeled from year-round economic crisis; the import-laced tournament did return in the Third Conference.
- The Crispa Redmanizers played their final season in the PBA, winning their 13th and final championship during the first All-Filipino Conference.
- The Great Taste Coffee Makers won its first two titles during this season, becoming the newest dynasty in the pro league.
- Ramon Fernandez received his second Most Valuable Player Award, highlighted by a year of more than 20 triple-double performances and a near triple-double average for the whole season.

== Champions ==
- First All Filipino Conference: Crispa Redmanizers
- Second All Filipino Conference: Great Taste Coffee Makers
- Invitational Championship: Great Taste Coffee Makers
- Team with best win–loss percentage: Great Taste Coffee Makers (39-14, .736)
- Best Team of the Year: Great Taste Coffee Makers (1st)

== First All-Filipino Conference ==
=== Elimination round ===
| Pos | Team | W | L | PCT | GB | Qualification |
|---|---|---|---|---|---|---|
| 1 | Northern Cement (G) | 11 | 3 | .786 | — | Advance to semifinal round |
| 2 | Crispa Redmanizers | 10 | 4 | .714 (Note: Semifinal round berth playoff: Crispa 124–120 Great Taste) | 1 | Advance to semifinal round |
| 3 | Great Taste Coffee Makers | 10 | 4 | .714 | 1 | Proceed to quarterfinal round |
| 4 | Beer Hausen Brewmasters | 8 | 6 | .571 | 3 | Proceed to quarterfinal round |
| 5 | Gilbey's Gin Tonics | 8 | 6 | .571 | 3 | Proceed to quarterfinal round |
| 6 | Gold Eagle Beermen | 4 | 10 | .286 | 7 | Proceed to quarterfinal round |
| 7 | Tanduay Rhum Makers | 3 | 11 | .214 | 8 | |
| 8 | Country Fair Hotdogs | 2 | 12 | .143 | 9 | |

(G) Guests

=== Quarterfinal round ===
| Pos | Team | W | L | PCT | GB | Qualification |
|---|---|---|---|---|---|---|
| 3 | Beer Hausen Brewmasters | 2 | 1 | .667 | — | Semifinal round |
| 4 | Gilbey's Gin Tonics | 2 | 1 | .667 | — | Semifinal round |
| 5 | Great Taste Coffee Makers | 1 | 2 | .333 | 1 | |
| 6 | Gold Eagle Beermen | 1 | 2 | .333 | 1 | |

=== Semifinal round ===
| Pos | Team | W | L | PCT | GB | Qualification |
|---|---|---|---|---|---|---|
| 1 | Crispa Redmanizers | 4 | 2 | .667 | — | Advance to the Finals |
| 2 | Gilbey's Gin Tonics | 3 | 3 | .500 (Note: Second-seed playoff: Gilbey's 115–109 Beer Hausen) | 1 | Advance to the Finals |
| 3 | Beer Hausen Brewmasters | 3 | 3 | .500 | 1 | Proceed to third place playoff |
| 4 | Northern Cement (G) | 2 | 4 | .333 | 2 | Proceed to third place playoff |

(G) Guests

=== Third place playoffs ===
| Team 1 | Series | Team 2 | Game 1 | Game 2 | Game 3 | Game 4 | Game 5 | Game 6 | Game 7 |
|---|---|---|---|---|---|---|---|---|---|
| (3) Beer Hausen Brewmasters | 2–3 (Note: The PBA Finals ended earlier than the third place playoffs. Rather than continue the series, the team that won more games in the series was named third place.) | (4) Northern Cement | 124–118 | 126–134 | 109–110 | 116–139 | 133–127 | — | — |

=== Finals ===
| Team 1 | Series | Team 2 | Game 1 | Game 2 | Game 3 | Game 4 | Game 5 | Game 6 | Game 7 |
|---|---|---|---|---|---|---|---|---|---|
| (1) Crispa Redmanizers | 4–1 | (2) Gilbey's Gin Tonics | 127–118 | 144–120 | 105–118 | 115–109 | 134–118 | — | — |

== Second All-Filipino Conference ==
=== Classification round ===
| Pos | Team | W | L | PCT | GB | Qualification |
|---|---|---|---|---|---|---|
| 1 | Great Taste Coffee Makers | 9 | 2 | .818 | — | Advance to semifinal round |
| 2 | Northern Cement (G) | 8 | 3 | .727 | 1 | Advance to semifinal round |
| 3 | Crispa Redmanizers | 7 | 4 | .636 | 2 | Proceed to quarterfinals |
| 4 | Gilbey's Gin Tonics | 6 | 5 | .545 | 3 | Proceed to quarterfinals |
| 5 | Gold Eagle Beermen | 5 | 6 | .455 | 4 | Proceed to quarterfinals |
| 6 | Beer Hausen Brewmasters | 5 | 6 | .455 | 4 | Proceed to quarterfinals |
| 7 | Tanduay Rhum Makers | 4 | 7 | .364 | 5 | Proceed to quarterfinals |
| 8 | Country Fair Hotdogs | 0 | 11 | .000 | 9 | Proceed to quarterfinals |

(G) Guests

=== Quarterfinals ===
| Team 1 | Series | Team 2 | Game 1 | Game 2 | Game 3 |
|---|---|---|---|---|---|
| Crispa Redmanizers | 2–0 | Gold Eagle Beermen | 128–120 (2OT) | 116–113 (OT) | — |
| Gilbey's Gin Tonics | 1–2 | Tanduay Rhum Makers | 112–114 | 123–112 | 117–122 |
| Beer Hausen Brewmasters | 2–0 | Country Fair Hotdogs | 111–88 | 148–104 | — |

=== Semifinal round ===
| Pos | Team | W | L | PCT | GB | Qualification |
|---|---|---|---|---|---|---|
| 1 | Great Taste Coffee Makers | 6 | 2 | .750 | — | Advance to the Finals |
| 2 | Beer Hausen Brewmasters | 5 | 3 | .625 (Note: Second-seed playoff: Beer Hausen 122–117 Northern (OT)) | 1 | Advance to the Finals |
| 3 | Northern Cement (G) | 5 | 3 | .625 | 1 | Proceed to third place playoff |
| 4 | Tanduay Rhum Makers | 2 | 6 | .250 (Note: Fourth-seed playoff: Tanduay 134–122 Crispa) | 4 | Proceed to third place playoff |
| 5 | Crispa Redmanizers | 2 | 6 | .250 | 4 | |

(G) Guests

=== Third place playoffs ===
| Team 1 | Series | Team 2 | Game 1 | Game 2 | Game 3 | Game 4 | Game 5 |
|---|---|---|---|---|---|---|---|
| (3) Tanduay Rhum Makers | 2–1 (Note: The PBA Finals ended earlier than the third place playoffs. Rather than continue the series, the team that won more games in the series was named third place.) | (4) Northern Cement | 121–135 | 95–127 | 148–110 | — | — |

=== Finals ===
| Team 1 | Series | Team 2 | Game 1 | Game 2 | Game 3 | Game 4 | Game 5 |
|---|---|---|---|---|---|---|---|
| (1) Great Taste Coffee Makers | 3–0 | (2) Beer Hausen Brewmasters | 101–88 | 111–99 | 101–94 | — | — |

== Invitational championship ==
=== Elimination round ===
| Pos | Team | W | L | PCT | GB | Qualification |
|---|---|---|---|---|---|---|
| 1 | Great Taste Coffee Makers | 7 | 1 | .875 | — | Advance to the finals |
| 2 | Crispa Redmanizers | 6 | 2 | .750 | 1 | Advance to the finals |
| 3 | Beer Hausen Brewmasters | 4 | 4 | .500 | 3 | Proceed to third place playoff |
| 4 | Gilbey's Gin Tonics | 2 | 6 | .250 | 5 | Proceed to third place playoff |
| 5 | Gold Eagle Beermen | 1 | 7 | .125 | 6 | |

=== Third place playoffs ===
| Team 1 | Series | Team 2 | Game 1 | Game 2 | Game 3 | Game 4 | Game 5 |
|---|---|---|---|---|---|---|---|
| (3) Beer Hausen Brewmasters | 3–1 | (4) Gilbey's Gin Tonics | 133–125 | 100–106 | 110–105 | 124–110 | — |

=== Finals ===
| Team 1 | Series | Team 2 | Game 1 | Game 2 | Game 3 | Game 4 | Game 5 |
|---|---|---|---|---|---|---|---|
| (1) Great Taste Coffee Makers | 3–2 | (2) Crispa Redmanizers | 138–115 | 117–118 | 103–116 | 117–105 | 127–106 |

- Best Import of the Conference: Jeff Collins (Great Taste)

== Awards ==
- Most Valuable Player: Ramon Fernandez (Beer Hausen)
- Rookie of the Year: Willie Pearson (Crispa)
- Most Improved Player: Manny Victorino (Great Taste)
- Best Import-Invitational: Jeff Collins (Great Taste)
- Mythical Five:
  - Ricardo Brown (Great Taste)
  - Atoy Co (Crispa)
  - Abet Guidaben (Crispa)
  - Manny Victorino (Great Taste)
  - Ramon Fernandez (Beer Hausen)
- Mythical Second Team:
  - Willie Pearson (Crispa)
  - Bernie Fabiosa (Crispa)
  - Terry Saldaña (Gilbey's Gin)
  - Bogs Adornado (Great Taste)
  - Philip Cezar (Crispa)

== Cumulative standings ==
| Pos | Team | Pld | W | L | PCT | Best finish |
|---|---|---|---|---|---|---|
| 1 | Great Taste Coffee Makers | 53 | 39 | 14 | .736 | Champions |
| 2 | Northern Cement (G) | 48 | 30 | 18 | .625 | Third place |
| 3 | Crispa Redmanizers | 61 | 38 | 23 | .623 | Champions |
| 4 | Beer Hausen Brewmasters | 66 | 35 | 31 | .530 | Finalist |
| 5 | Gilbey's Gin Tonics | 55 | 25 | 30 | .455 | Finalist |
| 6 | Tanduay Rhum Makers | 40 | 14 | 26 | .350 | Third place |
| 7 | Gold Eagle Beermen | 38 | 11 | 27 | .289 | Quarterfinalist |
| 8 | Country Fair Hotdogs | 27 | 2 | 25 | .074 | Quarterfinalist |

(G) Guests

=== Elimination round ===
| Pos | Team | Pld | W | L | PCT |
|---|---|---|---|---|---|
| 1 | Great Taste Coffee Makers | 33 | 26 | 7 | .788 |
| 2 | Northern Cement (G) | 25 | 19 | 6 | .760 |
| 3 | Crispa Redmanizers | 33 | 23 | 10 | .697 |
| 4 | Beer Hausen Brewmasters | 33 | 17 | 16 | .515 |
| 5 | Gilbey's Gin Tonics | 33 | 16 | 17 | .485 |
| 6 | Gold Eagle Beermen | 33 | 10 | 23 | .303 |
| 7 | Tanduay Rhum Makers | 25 | 7 | 18 | .280 |
| 8 | Country Fair Hotdogs | 25 | 2 | 23 | .080 |

(G) Guests

=== Playoffs ===
| Pos | Team | Pld | W | L |
|---|---|---|---|---|
| 1 | Beer Hausen Brewmasters | 33 | 18 | 15 |
| 2 | Crispa Redmanizers | 28 | 15 | 13 |
| 3 | Great Taste Coffee Makers | 20 | 13 | 7 |
| 4 | Northern Cement (G) | 23 | 11 | 12 |
| 5 | Gilbey's Gin Tonics | 22 | 9 | 13 |
| 6 | Tanduay Rhum Makers | 15 | 7 | 8 |
| 7 | Gold Eagle Beermen | 5 | 1 | 4 |
| 8 | Country Fair Hotdogs | 2 | 0 | 2 |

(G) Guests
