= Western Institute of Technology (Philippines) =

Private college in Iloilo City, Philippines

- Former name: Iloilo Rizal College
- Type: Private
- Established: 1964
- President: Richard Kenneth F. Salas III
- Location: Luna Street, La Paz, Iloilo City, Philippines; 10°42′32″N 122°33′50″E
- Campus: Main Campus, RTS Campus
- Colors: Orange, black, and white
- Nickname: WITtian
- Sporting affiliations: PRISAA
- Website: www.wit.edu.ph
- Location in the Visayas Location in the Philippines

The Western Institute of Technology (WIT) is an engineering college located in La Paz, Iloilo City, Philippines. It was established in 1964 with the primary goal of addressing the increasing demand for skilled manpower in the field of engineering in the Western Visayas region.

== History ==
The institution traces its origins to the College of Engineering of the former Iloilo City Colleges (now University of Iloilo-PHINMA), where faculty members, led by Dean Retogo A. Aldeguer, entered into an agreement with the school's administration to manage the College of Engineering. Following the expiration of this agreement in 1963 and the closure of Iloilo Rizal College (IRC), the faculty and staff behind the College of Engineering established WIT.

In 1962, a group of faculty members, led by Engr. Ricardo T. Salas, formed the WIT corporation with an initial paid-up capital of P75,000. After securing the necessary resources, WIT acquired the assets of IRC in September 1963 and officially launched the institution in 1964. The school initially offered engineering courses, including Civil, Mechanical, and Electrical Engineering, as well as a two-year BS Chemistry program.

WIT has expanded its academic offerings and facilities in 1966. It introduced a program in Education, followed by courses in Marine Engineering, Liberal Arts, and Graduate School programs in the 1970s. The school continued to evolve with the integration of computer subjects into its curriculum in the 1980s and the subsequent introduction of computer-related degree programs such as Computer Engineering and Information Technology in the 1990s and 2000s.

WIT is now also offering programs in fields such as Hotel and Restaurant Management and Political Science.
