= Manila Beer Brewmasters =

Philippine basketball team

- Founded: 1984
- Dissolved: 1986
- History: Beer Hausen Brewmasters (1984); Manila Beer Brewmasters (1985-1986)
- Team colors: Beer Hausen Manila Beer
- Company: Asia Brewery
- Head coach: Loreto Carbonell; Aaron James; Edgardo Ocampo; Joe Lipa; Valentin Eduque
- Ownership: Lucio Tan
- Championships: None; 3 Finals Appearances
Light uniform	1985-86; Dark uniform

The Manila Beer Brewmasters were a professional basketball team in the Philippine Basketball Association (PBA) from 1984-1986. It was formed after Basic Holdings, Inc., a company controlled by Lucio Tan, acquired the PBA franchise of Delta Motor Corporation, owner of league pioneer Toyota. The team was named after the brands of Asia Brewery, Inc., another Tan company - Beer Hausen (1984) and Manila Beer (1985-1986).

Beer Hausen intended to make Ramon Fernandez its franchise player with Jaworski relegated in the background. It acquired seven players from the Toyota team. Robert Jaworski refused to be a part of the new team, describing the sale as a 'farce,' and that players should not be sold "por kilo" ("lock, stock and barrel" or sold like cattle). Jaworski, Francis Arnaiz, Arnie Tuadles, Chito Loyzaga and Abe King refused to join Beer Hausen. Then-PBA president Carlos "Honeyboy" Palanca III offered to take in Jaworski and Arnaiz to his team, Gilbey's Gin; Tuadles and Loyzaga joined Great Taste and King joined Gold Eagle Beer. This marked the beginning of the Jaworski-Fernandez rivalry and directly contributed at being the cornerstone in making the Gins arguably the most popular team in Philippine basketball history with Jaworski at the forefront.

In the team's inaugural season, Ramon Fernandez achieved more than 20 triple-double performances, won his second MVP and led his team to a runner-up finish in the 1984 PBA Second All-Filipino Conference, losing to Great Taste via three-game sweep.

The following year, the ballclub was renamed Manila Beer and they bolstered their lineup through the acquisition of Crispa players Atoy Co, Yoyoy Villamin and Matthew Gaston. On October 1, 1985, three weeks into the Third Conference, Fernandez was traded to Tanduay for Abet Guidaben. Manila Beer made it to the finals for the second time in the 1985 PBA Reinforced Conference but were swept in four games in the best of seven series against guest team Northern Consolidated (NCC).

The year 1986 saw the Brewmasters having a new coach in national team mentor Joe Lipa. Manila Beer failed to make past eliminations and Lipa was replaced by Tito Eduque in the following conference. The Brewmasters were powered by imports Michael Young and Harold Keeling in the Third Conference and went all the way to the finals and placed second to Ginebra San Miguel, which had the super import tandem of Billy Ray Bates and Michael Hackett.

In January 1987, the franchise announced its disbandment. The Lucio Tan group would return to the PBA in 1999 with the second incarnation of Tanduay.

== Trivia ==
In their first season, the Brewmasters had seven former Toyota players and two players namely Itoy Esguerra and Ramon Cruz, who were acquired from Crispa. In their third and final season, the team had six players from Crispa's 1983 grandslam team and two former players from Toyota, Edgardo Cordero and Tim Coloso, from their roster. Esguerra, Cruz, Cordero and Coloso are the only four players who completed three seasons with the ballclub.

While teams that disbanded would either placed last or were booted out of the semifinals in their last conference, only Manila Beer and the legendary Crispa Redmanizers ends up a losing finalist in their final PBA conference.

== Season-by-season records ==
Legend
Champion

Runner-up

Third place

Season	Conference	Team name	Overall record			Finals
Season	Conference	Team name	W	L	%	Finals
1984	1st All-Filipino Conference	Beer Hausen	35	31	.530	
1984	2nd All-Filipino Conference	Beer Hausen	35	31	.530	Great Taste 3, Beer Hausen 0
1984	Invitational Championship	Beer Hausen	35	31	.530	
1985	Open Conference	Manila Beer	25	23	.520	
1985	All-Filipino Conference	Manila Beer	25	23	.520	
1985	Reinforced Conference	Manila Beer	25	23	.520	Northern 4, Manila Beer 0
1986	Reinforced Conference	Manila Beer	19	22	.463	
1986	All-Filipino Conference	Manila Beer	19	22	.463	
1986	Open Conference	Manila Beer	19	22	.463	Ginebra 4, Manila Beer 1
Overall record			79	76	.509	3 Runners-up

== Notable players ==
Members of PBA Hall of Fame and PBA 25 Greatest Players are in boldface.

- **Ramon Fernandez** - #10 center-forward
- **Alberto "Abet" Guidaben** - #55/#5 center
- **Lim Eng Beng** - guard
- **Fortunato "Atoy" Co, Jr** - #6 guard
- Nicanor "Nick" Bulaong - #20/#19 forward
- Emerito "Emer" Legaspi - #18 guard
- Leopoldo "Pol" Herrera - #14 forward
- Edgardo Cordero - #3 forward
- Ricardo "Ricky" Relosa - #15 center-forward
- Timoteo "Tim" Coloso - #32 guard-forward
- Elpidio "Yoyoy" Villamin - #13 forward-center
- Mon Cruz - #24 guard
- Mike Bilbao - #34 guard
- Rodolfo "Rudy" Lalota - #9 center
- Gary Vargas - #11 forward
- Matthew "Fritz" Gaston - #22 guard
- Abet Gutierrez - #13 - guard
- Vic Sanchez - #12 - forward
- Angelito "Itoy" Esguerra - #16 -guard-forward
- Roberto "Bert" Dela Rosa - #7 - guard
- Eddie Boy Mendoza - #17
- Ricardo Cui
- Tito Varela
- Ranulfo Robles
- Adonis Tierra
- Jesus Migalbin

=== Imports ===
- William 'Butch' Hays - 84 3rd Conference - 86 Reinforced
- Doug Harris - 85 Open
- Lewis Brown - 85 Open (replaced Harris)
- Francoise Wise - 85 Reinforced; lost to NCC in the finals
- George Turner / Carlton Cooper - 86 Reinforced
- Michael Young / Harold Keeling - 86 Open; lost to Ginebra in the finals

== See also ==
- Tanduay Rhum Makers
- Stag Pale Pilseners
- Cossack Blue Spirits
- Cobra Energy Drink Iron Men
- Boracay Rum Waves/Tanduay Light Rhum Masters

Preceded by Toyota Super Corollas	PBA teams genealogies 1984-86	Succeeded by (end)
