= Ramon Cruz =

Ramon A. Cruz

Associate Justice of the Court of Appeals of the Philippines
- Incumbent
- Assumed office November 5, 2009
- Preceded by: Teodoro Regino

Judge of the Regional Trial Court of Quezon City Branch 223
- Preceded by: Victorino P. Evangelista
- Succeeded by: Caridad Manaluz Walse-Lutero

Personal details
- Born: August 25, 1957 (age 69) Bicol Region, Philippines

Ramon A. Cruz (born August 25, 1957) is a Filipino jurist and an Associate Justice of the Court of Appeals of the Philippines. He was appointed to the Court of Appeals on November 5, 2009.

== Judicial career ==
Before his appointment to the Court of Appeals, Cruz served as a presiding judge of the Regional Trial Court in Quezon City.

== Notable cases ==
=== Rappler corporate registration case ===
Cruz was a member of the Court of Appeals panel that ruled on Rappler's challenge to the Securities and Exchange Commission's order concerning its certificate of incorporation. Rappler published the full text of the Court of Appeals decision in August 2024.

=== Pemberton case ===
Cruz was also a member of the Court of Appeals panel that considered the appeal of Joseph Scott Pemberton, who had been convicted in connection with the 2014 killing of Jennifer Laude. The Court of Appeals affirmed Pemberton's criminal liability and imposed a sentence with a maximum term of 10 years.

== Supreme Court nominations ==
Cruz has been considered by the Judicial and Bar Council for vacancies on the Supreme Court of the Philippines. In 2025, he was among the applicants considered in the selection process for a Supreme Court vacancy.
