= Ricky Relosa =

Filipino basketball player

Ricardo "Ricky" Relosa
Personal information
- Born: March 16, 1960 (age 66)
- Listed height: 6 ft 4 in (1.93 m)
- Listed weight: 198 lb (90 kg)

Career information
- Playing career: 1982–1993
- Position: Forward / center
- Number: 15, 7

Career history
- 1982–1983: Toyota Super Corollas
- 1984: Beer Hausen
- 1985: Ginebra San Miguel
- 1986-1989: Alaska Milkmen
- 1990: Pepsi Hotshots
- 1991-1993: Shell Rimula-X

Career highlights
- Most Improve Player (1986); Member of all-defensive team
Medals
Men's basketball
Representing Philippines
SEA Games
| Gold medal – first place | 1981 Manila | Team |

Ricardo Relosa (born March 16, 1960), is a retired Filipino professional basketball player in the Philippine Basketball Association, where he played both center and forward positions. After a brief amateur career where he became part of the first batch of local players recruited for the national training team, the Northern Cement basketball team coached by the late Ron Jacobs, Relosa turned professional in 1982 playing for the popular Toyota Super Corollas team.

== PBA career ==
As one of the four new acquisitions of Toyota Super Corollas in the 1982 PBA season, Relosa distinguished himself as a reliable and effective defensive player in two seasons with the Silverio-owned franchise. When the team disbanded before the start of the 1984 season, he was among the seven players absorbed by newcomer Beer Hausen Brewmasters, which bought the Toyota franchise. After spending one season playing under his former teammate and now playing-coach Robert Jaworski at Ginebra San Miguel in 1985, Relosa was shipped to newcomer Alaska Milk in 1986.

He played four seasons with Alaska, and in his first year, he was named Most Improved Player. Relosa also became known as half of the vaunted "Bruise Brothers" with Yoyoy Villamin in his next three seasons with the Milkmen. In 1990, he was unprotected by the ballclub and was signed by expansion team Pepsi-Cola, the third new team he had joined in the last seven years. After a woeful stint with Pepsi, Relosa left for the United States and most thought he would migrate there for good. But Ricky soon found himself in the Shell roster midway in the 1991 PBA All-Filipino Conference.

In 1992, ten years after he won two championships with Toyota as a rookie, Relosa became part of the champion team again with Shell winning the first conference crown. In his final PBA season, he triggered some sort of a "war" between the PBA and Games and Amusements Board (GAB) when he punched Swift import Ronnie Thompkins on the nape during the Shell-Swift encounter in the Commissioner's Cup. Relosa was suspended by then-commissioner Rey Marquez but the GAB decided to revoke his license, thus sparking a war of principles between the two bodies. Eventually, Relosa was allowed to play in the third conference after the Games and Amusements Board soften up on its stand.
