= List of former Philippine Basketball Association teams =

The Philippine Basketball Association (PBA) currently has twelve active teams, but there have been numerous teams that departed the league whether through acquisition and dissolution. Additionally, some teams, local and foreign, also competed as guest teams that took part in a number of conferences.

The NorthPort Batang Pier are the most recent team to go defunct, with the franchise being sold in 2024. The Alaska Aces have the most championships among defunct teams with 14, closely followed by the Crispa Redmanizers at 13.

== Defunct franchises ==
*	Denotes team that won a championship

Team	Company	Principal owner	Years active	Seasons played	Overall win–loss record	Win %	Championships	Acquired by
Carrier/Quasar/Fiberlite	Concepcion Industries, Inc.	José N. Concepcion Sr.	1975–1976	2	26–44	37.1%	0	none
7-Up (Syjuco group)	Seven-Up Bottling Company of the Philippines	Santiago Syjuco	1975–1977	3	25–74	25.2%	0	Filmanbank
Filmanbank	Filipinas Manufacturers Bank	Ricardo C. Silverio Sr.	1978–1979	2	32–57	35.9%	0	Galleon Shipping/CDCP
Galleon Shipping/CDCP	Galleon Shipping Corporation/ Construction and Development Corporation of the Philippines	Rodolfo Cuenca	1980–1981	2	32–28	53.3%	0	none
Tefilin	Filipinas Synthetic Fiber Corporation	Patricio L. Lim; Carlos Palanca Jr.	1980–1981	2	29–33	46.7%	0	none
U/Tex	Universal Textile Mills, Inc.	Patricio L. Lim; Walter Euyang Sr.	1975–1982	8	210–187	52.9%	2	Manhattan/Sunkist/Winston/Country Fair
Mariwasa Noritake/Mariwasa Honda/Finance Inc./Galerie Dominique	Mariwasa/ Galerie Dominique	Emerson CoSeteng/ Nikki CoSeteng	1975–1983	9	117–217	35.0%	0	none
Toyota	Delta Motor Corporation	Ricardo C. Silverio Sr.	1975–1983	9	338–178	65.5%	9	Beer Hausen/Manila Beer
Crispa	P. Floro and Sons, Inc.	Pablo B. Floro	1975–1984	10	403–186	68.4%	13	Shell
Manhattan/Sunkist/Winston/Country Fair	Sanyu Group of Companies		1983–1984	2	15–48	23.8%	0	none
Beer Hausen/Manila Beer	Asia Brewery	Lucio Tan	1984–1986	3	79–76	50.9%	0	none
Tanduay/YCO-Tanduay (Elizalde group)	Elizalde and Company, Inc.	Manolo Elizalde	1975–1987	13			3	Purefoods/Magnolia*
Presto/N-Rich/Great Taste/Tivoli	CFC Corporation	John Gokongwei Jr. Ignacio Gotao	1975–1992	18			6	Sta. Lucia
Pop Cola/Sarsi/Sunkist/Swift	RFM Corporation	Jose Ma. Concepcion III	1990–2001	12			4	Coca-Cola/Powerade
Tanduay (Tan group)	Tanduay Distillers, Inc.	Lucio Tan	1999–2001	3			0	FedEx/Air21/Burger King/Barako Bull Energy
Shell Helix/Shell Rimula X/Shell Azodrin/Pilipinas Shell Oilers/Formula Shell	Pilipinas Shell Petroleum Corporation	Pilipinas Shell Petroleum Corporation	1985–2005	21			4	Welcoat/Rain or Shine*
Sta. Lucia	Sta. Lucia Realty & Development Corporation	Exequiel Robles	1993–2010	17			2	Meralco*
Red Bull/Barako Bull	Photokina Marketing Corporation	Tony Chua	2000–2011	10			3	Shopinas.com/Air21
Coca-Cola/Powerade	Coca-Cola Bottlers Philippines, Inc.	Coca-Cola Bottlers Philippines, Inc.	2002–2012	11			2	GlobalPort/NorthPort
FedEx/Air21/Burger King/Barako Bull Energy	Airfreight 2100, Inc.	Alberto Lina	2002–2016	14			0	Phoenix*
Shopinas.com/Air21	Lina Group of Companies	Alberto Lina	2011–2014	3			0	NLEX*
Alaska/Hills Bros. Coffee	Alaska Milk Corporation	Wilfred Steven Uytengsu	1986–2022	35			14	Converge*
GlobalPort/NorthPort	Sultan 900 Capital, Inc.	Mikee Romero	2012–2025	12			0	Titan Ultra*

*Acquiring team still active

== Franchise lineage ==
As a result of franchise acquisitions, teams share their lineage with the teams acquired by their respective companies.

=== Active lineages ===
The lineages listed below are sorted from oldest to newest based on the establishing team. Bold indicates the active team in the lineage.

- Crispa → Shell → **Welcoat / Rain or Shine**
- N-Rich / Great Taste / Presto / Tivoli → Sta. Lucia → **Meralco**
- **Royal / Gold Eagle / Magnolia / Petron / San Miguel**
- Tanduay (1975) → **Purefoods / B-Meg / San Mig Coffee / Star / Magnolia**
- **Gilbey's Gin / St. George Whisky / Añejo Rhum / Gordon's Gin / Ginebra / Barangay Ginebra**
- Hills Bros. / Alaska → **Converge**
- **Pepsi / 7-Up / Mobiline / Talk 'N Text / TNT**
- Pop Cola / Sarsi / Sunkist / Swift → Coca-Cola / Powerade → GlobalPort / NorthPort → **Titan Ultra**
- Tanduay (1999) → FedEx / Air21 (I) / Burger King / Barako Bull Energy → **Phoenix**
- Red Bull / Barako Bull Energy Boosters → Shopinas.com / Air21 (II) → **NLEX**
- **Blackwater**
- **Kia / Mahindra / Columbian / Terrafirma**

=== Ended lineages ===
The following lineages have ended due to the final team having dissolved without any acquisitions.

- 7-Up (1975) → Filmanbank → Galleon / CDCP
- Carrier / Quasar / Fiberlite
- Mariwasa Noritake / Mariwasa Honda / Finance Inc. / Galerie Dominique
- Toyota → Manila Beer / Beer Hausen
- Tefilin
- U/Tex → Manhattan / Sunkist / Winston / Country Fair

== Record-keeping ==
Once a franchise is acquired by a new entity, the previous team is considered to be ceased and all of its records are kept with that team. The new team resulting from the acquisition will then start its records fresh akin to an expansion team. However, there have been a few special cases.

=== Special cases ===
==== Pepsi Mega Bottlers transfer to Lapanday Holdings ====
When Frederick Dael took over as president of Pepsi Cola Products Philippines, Inc. (PCPPI), which owned the Pepsi Mega Bottlers, changes were made in the company's priorities which would see the team be disbanded. PCPPI chairman Luis Lorenzo Sr. sought to transfer ownership of the franchise to one of his other entities, and in January 1996, the team's franchise was transferred to Lapanday Holdings, Lorenzo's holding company. The new team became known as the Mobiline Cellulars after partnering with the Pilipino Telephone Corporation (now PLDT Communication and Energy Ventures), now known as the TNT Tropang 5G, with the records of the 7-Up / Pepsi franchise carrying over.

==== Tanduay's return ====
Tanduay's first PBA franchise was owned by Elizalde & Company Inc. It was one of the PBA's founding teams, competing from 1975 to 1987. In 1988, Tanduay was sold to Lucio Tan's Twin Ace Holdings Corporation while the PBA franchise was acquired by Pure Foods Corporation, forming today's Magnolia Chicken Timplados Hotshots.

Tan's LT Group would later bring Tanduay back to the PBA in 1999 with the Tanduay Rhum Masters and with it the records of the company's previous franchise carried over. The new Rhum Masters played until 2002 when the team was acquired by the Lina Group, forming the FedEx Express.

==== Air21 and Barako Bull switch names ====
Timeline of the Air21–Barako Bull name switch
2011 Governors' Cup	2011–12 Philippine Cup	2012 Commissioner's Cup	Current lineage
Air21 Express (I)	Barako Bull Energy	Barako Bull Energy	Phoenix Fuel Masters
Barako Bull Energy Boosters	Shopinas.com Clickers	Air21 Express (II)	NLEX Road Warriors

When the Lina Group acquired a majority stake in Energy Food and Drinks, the distributor of Red Bull to the Philippines, the group now owned the Barako Bull Energy Boosters alongside their existing team, the Air21 Express. In the 2011–12 PBA Philippine Cup, the Energy Boosters were renamed to the Shopinas.com Clickers while the Express were renamed to the Barako Bull Energy. In the following Commissioner's Cup, the Clickers were renamed to the Air21 Express, meaning that the two franchises had switched names.

To prevent any confusion, most of the Shopinas / Air21 (II) franchise history and records were separated from the Red Bull / Barako Bull Energy Boosters franchise as if the Lina Group acquired the latter, with the only elements carrying over being the transaction history and lineage. As with most cases, the Barako Bull Energy franchise retained its history and lineage with FedEx / Burger King / Air21 (I).

To create a distinction between the two Air21 franchises, the original is abbreviated as "AIR21" and the second one as "AIR21X" in the official PBA annual, Hardcourt. In some instances, the team records of the original Air21 franchise is "shared" with the second Air21 franchise. An example would be during the jersey retirement of Vergel Meneses – although he played for the original Air21 franchise, his jersey was retired by the second Air21 franchise.

Air21 (II) were acquired by Manila North Tollways Corporation in 2014, becoming the NLEX Road Warriors, while Phoenix Petroleum acquired the Barako Bull Energy in 2016, establishing the Phoenix Fuel Masters.

== Guest teams ==
=== Local teams ===
Team	Original league	Seasons played	Championships
Northern Consolidated Cement	N/A (National team)	2 (1984, 1985)	1 (1985 Reinforced)
Philippine national team	N/A (National team)	5 (1986, 1987, 1988, 1989, 2003)	
Smart Gilas	N/A (National team)	2 (2009–10, 2010–11)	

=== Foreign teams ===
Team	Country	Original league	Seasons played	Championships
Ramrod Blocks (Melbourne Panthers)	Australia	—	1 (1977)	
Emtex Sacronel (S.E. Palmeiras)	Brazil	São Paulo State Championship	1 (1977)	
Adidas Rubberworld	France	—	1 (1980)	
Nicholas Stoodley	United States	—	1 (1980)	1 (1980 Invitational)
South Korea	South Korea	N/A (national team)	2 (1982, 2003)	
KK Novi Sad	Serbia and Montenegro	Basketball League of Serbia	1 (2003)	
Magnolia-Jilin Tigers (Jilin Yiqi)	China	Chinese Basketball Association	1 (2003)	
Yonsei University	South Korea	—	1 (2003)	
U.S. Pro-Am Selection	United States	—	1 (2004)	
UBC Thunderbirds	Canada	Canada West Universities Athletic Association	1 (2004)	
Bay Area Dragons	Hong Kong	East Asia Super League	1 (2022–23)	
Eastern	Hong Kong	Hong Kong A1 Division Championship	1 (2024–25)	
Macau Giant Pandas	Macau	—	1 (2026)	

== See also ==
- All-time Philippine Basketball Association team standings
