= 1983 PBA Open Conference =

- Duration: August 28 – December 1, 1983
- TV partner(s): Vintage Sports (City2)

Finals
- Champions: Crispa Redmanizers
- Runners-up: Great Taste Coffee Makers

Awards
- Best Import: Billy Ray Bates (Crispa Redmanizers)

PBA Open Conference chronology
- 1985 >

PBA conference chronology
- < 1983 Reinforced Filipino 1984 First All-Filipino >

The 1983 Philippine Basketball Association (PBA) Open Conference was the third and last conference of the 1983 PBA season. It started on August 28 and ended on December 1, 1983. The tournament is an import-laden format, which requires two imports per each team.

== Format ==
The following format was observed for the conference:

- Double-round eliminations; 14 games per team; Teams are then seeded by basis on win–loss records.
- The two teams at the bottom of the standings after the elimination round will be eliminated. The top two teams will advance outright to the semifinals.
- The next four teams will qualify in a single round-robin quarterfinals; the top two teams will advance to the semifinals.
- Semifinals will be a double round-robin affair with the four remaining teams.
- The top two teams in the semifinals advance to the best-of-five finals. The last two teams dispute the third-place trophy in a best-of-five playoff.

== Imports ==
Each team were allowed two imports. The first line in the table are the original reinforcements of the teams. Below the name are the replacement of the import above. Same with the third replacement that is also highlighted with a different color. GP is the number of games played.

Team	Name	GP	Name	GP
Crispa Redmanizers	DeWayne Scales	5	Billy Ray Bates	24
Crispa Redmanizers	Larry Demic	19		
Galerie Dominique	Larry Fogle	16	Donald Robinson	16
Gilbey's Gin	Anthony Roberts	2	Jacky Dorsey	27
Gilbey's Gin	Lew Massey	25		
Great Taste Coffee	Charles Thompson	2	Norman Black	24
Great Taste Coffee	Dawan Scott	22		
San Miguel Beermen	Rich Adams	28	Donnie Ray Koonce	28
Tanduay Rhum Makers	George Melton	18	Francois Wise	19
Toyota Super Corollas	Ralph Brewster	15	Andrew Fields	15
Winston Kings	Darryl Smith	2	Eddie Roberson	2
Winston Kings	Larry McNeill	12	Maurice Williams	12

== Elimination round ==
Pos	Team	W	L	PCT	GB	Qualification
1	Great Taste Coffee Makers	9	5	.643	—	Advance to semifinal round
2	Crispa Redmanizers	9	5	.643	—	Advance to semifinal round
3	San Miguel Beermen	7	7	.500	2	Proceed to quarterfinal round
4	Galerie Dominique Artists	7	7	.500	2	Proceed to quarterfinal round
5	Gilbey's Gin Gimlets	7	7	.500	2	Proceed to quarterfinal round
6	Tanduay Rhum Makers	6	8	.429 (Note: Quarterfinal round berth playoff: Tanduay 111–110 Toyota)	3	Proceed to quarterfinal round
7	Toyota Super Corollas	6	8	.429	3	
8	Winston Kings	5	9	.357	4	

== Quarterfinal round berth playoff ==
Vintage

October 30

Tanduay Rhum Makers 111, Toyota Super Corollas 110

Araneta Coliseum, Quezon City

== Quarterfinal round ==
Pos	Team	W	L	PCT	GB	Qualification
1	Gilbey's Gin Gimlets	2	1	.667 (Note: Head-to-head quotient: Gilbey's 1.095, San Miguel 0.981, Tanduay 0.927; semifinal round berth playoff: San Miguel 108–104 Tanduay)	—	Semifinal round
2	San Miguel Beermen	2	1	.667	—	Semifinal round
3	Tanduay Rhum Makers	2	1	.667	—	
4	Galerie Dominique Artists	0	3	.000	2	

== Semifinal round berth playoff ==
Vintage

November 10

San Miguel Beermen 108, Tanduay Rhum Makers 104

Araneta Coliseum, Quezon City

== Semifinal round ==
Pos	Team	W	L	PCT	GB	Qualification
1	Crispa Redmanizers	3	3	.500 (Note: Head-to-head quotient: Crispa 1.033, Gilbey's 1.003, Great Taste 1.000, San Miguel 0.966; first-seed playoff: Crispa 130–120 San Miguel; second-seed playoff: Great Taste 126–118 Gilbey's)	—	Advance to the Finals
2	Great Taste Coffee Makers	3	3	.500	—	Advance to the Finals
3	Gilbey's Gin Gimlets	3	3	.500	—	Proceed to third-place playoff
4	San Miguel Beermen	3	3	.500	—	Proceed to third-place playoff

Notes:

All four teams were tied with three wins and three losses after the double-round semifinals. The PBA had their first-ever double playoff for the two finals berths.

== Second seed playoff ==
Vintage

November 26

Great Taste Coffee Makers 126, Gilbey's Gin Tonics 118

Araneta Coliseum, Quezon City

== First seed playoff ==
Vintage

November 26

Crispa Redmanizers 130, San Miguel Beermen 120

Araneta Coliseum, Quezon City

== Third place playoffs ==
Vintage

November 27

San Miguel Beermen 127, Gilbey's Gin Tonics 135

Araneta Coliseum, Quezon City

Vintage

November 29

San Miguel Beermen 141, Gilbey's Gin Tonics 121

Araneta Coliseum, Quezon City

Vintage

December 1

San Miguel Beermen 129, Gilbey's Gin Tonics 119
Series aborted; San Miguel wins series by virtue of having more wins, 2–1, when series was aborted

Araneta Coliseum, Quezon City

== Finals ==
Vintage

November 27

Crispa Redmanizers 118, Great Taste Coffee Makers 113

Araneta Coliseum, Quezon City

Vintage

November 29

Crispa Redmanizers 149, Great Taste Coffee Makers 132

Araneta Coliseum, Quezon City

Vintage

December 1

Crispa Redmanizers 133, Great Taste Coffee Makers 113
Crispa wins series, 3–0

Araneta Coliseum, Quezon City
