= Freddie Webb =

Filipino basketball player and politician

The Honorable Freddie N. Webb
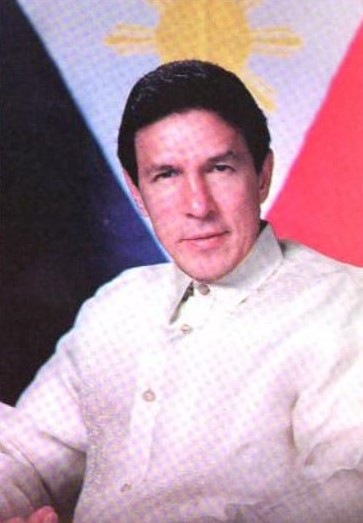
- Official portrait, 1997

Senator of the Philippines
- In office June 30, 1992 – June 30, 1998

Member of the Philippine House of Representatives from Parañaque's at-large congressional district
- In office June 30, 1987 – June 30, 1992
- Preceded by: Post created
- Succeeded by: Roilo Golez

Member of the Pasay City Council
- In office December 30, 1971 – June 12, 1978

Personal details
- Born: Freddie Nelle Webb; November 24, 1942 (age 83)
- Party: PDP–Laban (2001–present)
- Other political affiliations: LDP (1988–2001); Lakas ng Bansa (1987–1988)
- Spouse: Elizabeth Pagaspas
- Relations: Isabella Gamez (grandniece)
- Children: 6, including Hubert, Pinky, and Jason
- Education: Colegio de San Juan de Letran (BA)
- Occupation: Politician
- Profession: Actor, TV Host, Sportscaster, Radio Anchor, Athlete, Coach
- Basketball career

Personal information
- Listed height: 5 ft 10 in (178 cm)
- Listed weight: 148 lb (67 kg)

Career information
- College: Letran
- Playing career: 1965–1978
- Coaching career: 1975–1986

Career history

Playing
- 1965–1975: YCO Painters
- 1976–1978: Tanduay Rhum Makers

Coaching
- 1975: Letran
- 1981–1983: YCO-Tanduay
- 1985–1986: Shell Azodrin Bugbusters

Career highlights
- As player: MICAA champion (1975); National Open Champion (1967)
Medals
Men's basketball
Representing Philippines
ABC Championship
Bronze medal – third place	1969 Bangkok	Team
Silver medal – second place	1971 Tokyo	Team

Freddie Nelle Webb (born November 24, 1942) is a Filipino retired basketball player and coach, former politician, and television and radio personality.

== Education ==
He completed his elementary education at San Beda College and his degree in Bachelor of Arts in English at Colegio de San Juan de Letran.

== Personal life ==
He is married to Elizabeth Pagaspas of Tanauan, Batangas with whom he has six children, among them Hubert, Pinky, and Jason Webb.

== Basketball career ==
Webb first played for the Letran Knights (1960–1964) and became a star for the team. After college, he played in the MICAA with the YCO Painters (1965–1975) and in the PBA with the Tanduay Rhum Makers (1976–1978).

He was a member of the national basketball team that participated in the 1972 Summer Olympics. After retiring in 1978, Webb coached YCO-Tanduay (1981–1983) and Shell (1985) in the Philippine Basketball Association. He also coached his alma mater Letran for one season in 1975 and finished the season as runner up to the Ateneo Blue Eagles.

== Political career ==
Webb was elected in 1971 as city councilor in Pasay, which he held up to 1978.

In 1987, Webb ran and won in the Philippine legislative elections as the first representative of the lone district of Parañaque under Lakas ng Bansa. From 1987 to 1988, he was awarded one of the Ten Outstanding Congressman of the Year Award. He sponsored the provisions creating the Sangguniang Kabataan in the Local Government Code of 1991.

In 1992, he was elected Senator, placing 12th to earn a six-year term under LDP. As Senator, he held various chairmanships like Senate Committees/Committee on Health and Demography and the Committee on Games and Amusements. He also headed the Senate Ad Hoc Committee on AIDS and the Congressional Commission on Health. He authored, co-authored and steered into law, acts such as the National Health Insurance Act, (R.A.7875), The Hepatitis-B Immunization Act, (R.A. 7846), The Corneal Transplant Law, the Voluntary Blood Donation Act, (R.A.7719) and the Act Granting Benefits to Barangay Health Workers (R.A. 7883).

He ran for re-election in 1998 but was unsuccessful, placing 23rd out of the 12 seats up for election. In 2001, he attempted to make a political comeback, this time for Pasay's lone district, under PDP–Laban, but lost.

== Television and radio ==
Webb began a career in movies and television from his days as a basketball player up to the present. He is also a radio personality and sportscaster.

After the declaration of Martial Law in 1972, Webb hosted the daily show Pa-bandying, Bandying in 1973 over RPN. But he became a household name when he was cast as Jimmy Capistrano, the modelling and talent agency proprietor in IBC's Chicks to Chicks in 1979. He was paired with comedienne Nova Villa, who was Ines Capistrano, the wacky housewife of Jimmy Capistrano. Their team-up was hilariously accepted and where the funny line "Sweetheart, ligo na tayo" (transl. "Sweetheart, let's take a bath"), started.

== Coaching record ==
=== PBA ===
Season	Team	Conference	Elims./Clas. round					Playoffs				
Season	Team	Conference	GP	W	L	PCT	Finish	PG	W	L	PCT	Results
1981	YCO-Tanduay	Open	8	1	7	.125	10th	—	—	—	—	Missed playoffs
1981	YCO-Tanduay	Reinforced	9	5	4	.556	3rd	12	5	7	.417	Lost third place
1982	YCO-Tanduay	Reinforced	10	9	9	.500	5th	2	0	2	.000	Lost in the Quarterfinals
1982	YCO-Tanduay	Open	18	11	7	.611	3rd	3	1	2	.333	Lost in the Quarterfinals (Note: Round Robin Quarterfinals)
1983	Tanduay	All-Filipino	7	3	4	.429	5th	—	—	—	—	Missed playoffs
1983	Tanduay	Reinforced	14	7	7	.500	3rd	13	9	4	.692	Third Place
1983	Tanduay	Open	14	6	8	.429	6th	3	2	1	.667	Lost in the Quarterfinals
1985	Shell	Open	12	4	8	.333	6th	0	0	3	.333	Lost in the Quarterfinals
1985	Shell	All-Filipino	10	5	5	.500	2nd	16	8	8	.500	Lost in the Finals
1985	Shell	Reinforced	12	2	10	.167	7th	—	—	—	—	Missed playoffs
1986	Shell	Reinforced	10	3	7	.300	5th	2	0	2	.000	(resigned) (Note: Resigned after two consecutive losses in the Semifinal round against Great Taste (in OT), and Ginebra respectively.)
Totals			124	56	76	.424		51	25	29	.463	0 PBA championship

== Electoral performance ==
=== 2001 ===
Pasay House Of Representative Election
Party	Candidate	Votes	%
Lakas	Ma. Consuelo "Connie" Dy	52,015	45.11
NPC	Rolando "Ding" Briones	24,663	21.39
PDP–Laban	Freddie Webb	22,134	19.20
Aksyon	Mina Gabor	12,906	11.19
Liberal	Panfilo "Justo" Justo	3,021	2.62
Independent	Allan Carreon	241	0.21
Independent	Pedro Montaño	176	0.15
Independent	Rolly Ladesma	149	0.13
Total votes		115,305	100.00
Lakas hold			

== Filmography ==
=== Film ===
Year	Title	Role
1971	Dimasupil Brothers	
1971	Fastbreak	
1972	The Snatcher	
1973	Sikaran Boxer	
1973	Johnny Jokor	
1976	Walang Pagkalupig	
1980	Wanted Wives	
1980	Problem Child	
1982	Pamilya Dimagiba	
1984	Tender Age	
1985	Magchumicap Ka	
2012	Every Breath U Take	Pepe
2013	Bakit Hindi Ka Crush ng Crush Mo?	Don Antonio Prieto
2014	1st Ko si 3rd	Third Rodriguez
2015	Liwanag sa Dilim	Police Officer
2015	You're My Boss	Sir Albert
2015	Etiquette for Mistresses	Roberto "Bob" Mariano
2015	The Prenup	Alfonso Billones
2016	This Time	Melchor Martinez
2016	Love Me Tomorrow	Manuel Monteclaro
2016	Enteng Kabisote 10 and the Abangers	
2018	Three Words to Forever	Cito Andrada
2019	Maria	Ricardo Dela Vega
2020	Four Sisters Before the Wedding	Grace's father in a still picture
2026	Young Blood	Fredo

=== Television ===
Year	Title	Role
1979–1991	Chicks to Chicks/Chika Chika Chicks	Jimmy Capistrano
1984–1985	PBA on Vintage Sports	Color commentator
1990	Mana-Mana	unknown
1992–1997	Abangan Ang Susunod Na Kabanata	Tito Delos Santos
1994	Haybol Rambol	unknown
1999	Metropolitan Basketball Association	Color Commentator
2004	Forever In My Heart	Alvin Sagrado
2005	The Basketball Show	unknown
2005	Maynila	unknown
2007	Dalawang Tisoy	Jack
2007	Ysabella	Norman
2008	Ang Babaeng Hinugot sa Aking Tadyang	Don Apollo Alcaraz
2010	Pepito Manaloto	The Boss
2011	Babaeng Hampaslupa	George Wong
2011	Futbolilits	Sensei
2012	Dahil sa Pag-ibig	Daniel Falcon
2013	Apoy sa Dagat	Manolo Lamayre
2013	Magpakailanman – Baby Tsina: Ang Lola Prosti	Jaime
2013	Akin Pa Rin ang Bukas	Jaime Villacorta
2014	Carmela: Ang Pinakamagandang Babae sa Mundong Ibabaw	Ramon Corpuz
2014	Dading	Mang Kanor
2014	Wagas	Jessie
2014	Ilustrado	Don Jose Alberto
2015	Nathaniel	Punong Maestro
2015	Ningning	Francisco "Kiko" Cruz
2016	Born for You	Ralph "Boss Ralph" Marquez
2017	La Luna Sangre	Senator Salvador Paglinauan
2017	Langit Lupa	Mario
2017	My Dear Heart	Dr. Lana
2018	Kapag Nahati ang Puso	Ramon Del Valle
2018	Victor Magtanggol	Renato Regalado
2019	Love You Two	Jake Reyes Sr.
2024	Can't Buy Me Love	Dr. John Capistrano
2025	Tropang G.O.A.T.	Tatang Batas

== Radio ==
- Sports Talk "Co-Host with Gretchen Fullido" (DZMM, 2004–2014)
- FastBreak "Co-Host with Boyet Sison" (DZMM, August 2, 2014 – March 14, 2020)
