= List of Philippine Basketball Association records =

These are the records set in the Philippine Basketball Association (PBA) and PBA D-League. Flags indicate the nationality of the player; all Filipinos and foreigners of Filipino descent are treated as locals and all other non-Filipinos are imports.

== Individual single-game records ==
- Most points:
  - 105 by (United States) Tony Harris (Swift) vs. Ginebra San Miguel, October 10, 1992, at Iloilo City
  - 79 by (Philippines) Allan Caidic (Presto Tivoli) vs. Ginebra San Miguel, November 21, 1991, at The ULTRA, Pasig
- Most points in a half:
  - 59 by (United States) Tony Harris (Swift) vs. Ginebra San Miguel, October 10, 1992, at Iloilo City
  - 53 by (Philippines) Allan Caidic (Presto Tivoli) vs. Ginebra San Miguel, November 21, 1991, at The ULTRA, Pasig
- Most points in a quarter:
  - 37 by (Philippines) Allan Caidic (Presto Tivoli) vs. Ginebra San Miguel, November 21, 1991, at The ULTRA, Pasig in the third quarter
  - 33 by (United States) Michael Hackett (Ginebra) vs. Great Taste, November 21, 1985, at The ULTRA, Pasig
- Most rebounds:
  - 45 by (United States) Michael Hackett (Ginebra) vs. Great Taste, November 21, 1985, at The ULTRA, Pasig
  - 31 by (Philippines) June Mar Fajardo (San Miguel Beermen) vs. Magnolia, May 15, 2019, at Smart Araneta Coliseum, Quezon City
- Most assists:
  - 28 by (Philippines) Eugene Quilban (7-Up) vs. Shell, August 9, 1992, at PSC-NASA, Pasig
  - 20 by (United States) Terrance Bailey (Presto) vs. Alaska, November 2, 1989, at The ULTRA, Pasig
- Most steals:
  - 11 by (United States) Damian Owens (Sta. Lucia) vs. Red Bull, December 9, 2005, at Cuneta Astrodome
  - 10 by (Philippines) Ryan Reyes (Talk 'N Text, 2011–12 Philippine Cup finals) vs. Powerade Tigers, January 29, 2012, at Smart Araneta Coliseum, Quezon City
- Most blocks:
  - 13 by (United States) Andrew Fields (Toyota) vs. Crispa, April 21, 1981
  - 11 by (Philippines) Jerry Codiñera (Purefoods) vs. San Miguel, October 3, 1989
- Most turnovers:
  - 13 by (United States) Michael Hackett (Ginebra) vs. Great Taste, November 24, 1985
  - 12 by (Philippines) Danny Ildefonso (San Miguel) vs. Pop Cola, March 4, 2001, at PhilSports Arena
  - 12 by (Philippines) Asi Taulava (Mobiline) vs. San Miguel, March 14, 1999
  - 12 by (Philippines) Marlou Aquino (Ginebra) vs. Sunkist, March 5, 1996
- Most minutes and seconds:
  - 63 by (United States) Lambert Shell (Sta. Lucia) vs. San Miguel (3 overtimes), November 9, 1993
  - 61:02 by (Philippines) Christian Standhardinger (NorthPort Batang Pier) vs. NLEX (3 overtimes), November 27, 2019
- Most two-point field goals made:
  - 31 by (Philippines) Paul Alvarez (Alaska) vs Shell, April 26, 1990
- Most three-point field goals made:
  - 17 by (Philippines) Allan Caidic (Presto Tivoli) vs. Ginebra San Miguel, November 21, 1991, at The ULTRA, Pasig
  - 14 by (United States) Jose Slaughter (Hills Bros.) vs. Great Taste, October 18, 1987
- Most three-point field goals made in a quarter
  - 9 by (Philippines) Allan Caidic (Presto Tivoli) vs. Ginebra San Miguel, November 21, 1991, at The ULTRA, Pasig
  - 9 by (Philippines) Ren-Ren Ritualo (FedEx Express) vs. Red Bull Barako, April 29, 2005, at Ynares Center, Antipolo
- Most consecutive three-point field goals made:
  - 9 by (Philippines) Don Trollano (NLEX Road Warriors) vs Terrafirma Dyip, March 2, 2023, at Araneta Coliseum
- Best field-goal percentage in a game:
  - 12/12 (100%) by (Philippines) Ali Peek (Coca-Cola) vs. Alaska, March 10, 2006
- Best field-goal percentage in a quarter:
  - 12/12 (100%) by (Philippines) CJ Perez (San Miguel) vs. Ginebra, January 17, 2026, at Araneta Coliseum in the first quarter
- Most free throws made in a game
  - 43 by (United States) Tony Harris (Swift) vs. Ginebra San Miguel, October 10, 1992, at Iloilo City
  - 24 by (Philippines) Nelson Asaytono (Swift) vs. Purefoods Tender Juicy Hotdogs, July 2, 1992
- Most consecutive free throws made in a game
  - 23 by (United States) Rob Williams (Tanduay) vs. Ginebra, October 12, 1986
- Most free throw attempts in a game
  - 29 by (Philippines) Asi Taulava (Talk 'N Text) vs. Alaska, June 27, 2003

=== All-Star Game records ===
- Most points:
  - 48 by Terrence Romeo (Gilas Pilipinas), 2018, Batangas City Coliseum, Batangas City
- Most rebounds:
  - 27 by Calvin Abueva (Smart PBA All-Stars), 2018, University of San Agustin Gym, Iloilo City
- Most assists:
  - 17 by Jimmy Alapag (South All-Stars), 2015, Palawan City Coliseum, Palawan
- Most three-point field goals made:
  - 9 by Allan Caidic (North All-Stars) vs. South All-Stars, 1993, Cuneta Astrodome, Pasay
  - 9 by Paul Lee (North All-Stars) vs. South All-Stars, 2019, Calasiao Sports Complex, Pangasinan

=== PBA finals records ===
- Most rebounds:
  - 31 by (Philippines) June Mar Fajardo (San Miguel, 2019 Philippine Cup finals) vs. Magnolia, May 15, 2019, at Smart Araneta Coliseum, Quezon City
- Most steals:
  - 10 by (Philippines) Ryan Reyes (Talk 'N Text, 2011–12 Philippine Cup finals) vs. Powerade Tigers, January 29, 2012, at Smart Araneta Coliseum, Quezon City
- Most three-point field goals made:
  - 10 by (Philippines) Mikey Williams (TNT Tropang Giga, 2021 Philippine Cup finals) vs. Magnolia Hotshots, October 24, 2021, at the Don Honorio Ventura State University Gymnasium

== Individual season records ==
- Most games played:
  - 75 by (Philippines) Glenn Khobuntin (TNT, 2024–25 season)
- Most three-point field goals made in a single season:
  - 198 by (Philippines) Calvin Oftana (TNT, 2024–25 PBA season)

== Team single-game records ==
- Most points:
  - 197 by Ginebra (vs. Great Taste, 168), November 21, 1985
- Most points in a lost game:
  - 178 by Pepsi (vs. Purefoods, 182), October 4, 1990 (triple overtime)
- Most points in a half:
  - 112 by Ginebra (vs. Great Taste, 2nd half), November 21, 1985
- Most points in a quarter:
  - 65 by Presto (vs. Swift, 4th quarter), 161–179, October 18, 1992
- Fewest points:
  - 47 by Shell (vs. Mobiline, 79), May 3, 2000
- Fewest points in a won game:
  - 54 by Pop Cola (vs. Shell, 52), July 18, 1999
  - 54 by Sta. Lucia (vs. Purefoods, 53), May 22, 2005
- Fewest points in a half:
  - 18 by Shell (vs. Mobiline), May 3, 2000
- Fewest combined points in a half:
  - 12 by Mobiline (5) and Alaska (7), May 23, 1998, at Urdaneta, Pangasinan
- Fewest points in a quarter:
  - 2 by Mobiline (1st quarter), vs. Sta. Lucia, 69–71, February 26, 2001
  - 2 by Barangay Ginebra (3rd quarter), vs. Coca-Cola, April 26, 2003
  - 2 by NorthPort (3rd quarter), vs Rain or Shine, 68–70, October 18, 2020
  - 2 by Blackwater (1st quarter), vs NLEX, 68–98, July 15, 2022
- Most combined points by both teams:
  - 365 points by Ginebra (197) and Great Taste (168), November 21, 1985
- Fewest combined points by both teams:
  - 106 points by Pop Cola (54) and Shell (52), July 18, 1999
- Most rebounds:
  - 93 rebounds by Terrafirma vs Titan Ultra, July 10, 2026, at Ynares Center, Antipolo
- Most offensive rebounds:
  - 42 offensive rebounds by Tanduay vs U/Tex, November 15, 1980
- Most three-point field goals made:
  - 23 by Talk 'N Text vs. Air21, April 23, 2008
  - 23 by Talk 'N Text vs. San Miguel, January 14, 2009
  - 23 by San Miguel vs. Columbian, September 21, 2018
  - 23 by NLEX vs. Terrafirma, March 3, 2023
- Fewest turnovers:
  - 3 by TNT vs San Miguel, August 29, 2022 (2022 Philippine Cup finals, game 4)
- Biggest winning margin:
  - 60 by NLEX (138) vs. Macau Giant Pandas (78), October 7, 2026
- Biggest winning margin in a playoff game:
  - 54 points by Shell (154) vs. Tanduay (100), November 16, 1986
- Biggest halftime margin:
  - 40 by Sta. Lucia (58) vs. Coca-Cola (18), November 14, 2007
- Most consecutive unanswered points:
  - 32–0 (fourth quarter), from 80–85 (8:31) to 112–85 (1:43), Ginebra 116, Shell 90, May 14, 1991 (1991 First Conference finals, game 5)
- Most consecutive unanswered points from the start of a game
  - 17–0 (12:00 to 7:27), Talk 'N Text (vs. Alaska), June 15, 2011
  - 17–0 (12:00 to 7:56), TNT (vs. San Miguel), June 23, 2017
  - 17–0 (12:00 to 7:47), Barangay Ginebra (vs. San Miguel), August 3, 2018
- Best free-throw percentage in a game:
  - 32/32 (100%) by (Philippines) Purefoods Hotdogs, November 26, 1989, at The ULTRA, Pasig
- Most technical fouls by a team:
  - 9 by Mobiline (97), vs. Shell (109), December 1, 1998
- Most combined technical fouls by both teams:
  - 16 by Alaska (9) and Shell (7), October 25, 1997 (1997 Governors' Cup regular conference)
  - 16 by Alaska (8) and GlobalPort (8), January 6, 2016 (2015–16 Philippine Cup semifinals, game 2)
- Most disqualifications:
  - 7 by Pepsi, 178 (vs. Purefoods, 182) (triple overtime), October 4, 1990
- Most combined disqualifications by both teams:
  - 9 by CDCP (5) and St. George (4), August 27, 1981
  - 9 by Pepsi (7) and Purefoods (2), (triple overtime), October 4, 1990
  - 9 by Purefoods (5) and Red Bull (4), (triple overtime), May 22, 2004

=== All-Star Game records ===
- Most points (winning team):
  - 185 by North All-Stars vs South All-Stars, 2019
- Most points (losing team):
  - 170 by South All-Stars vs North All-Stars, 2019
- Most combined points by both teams:
  - 355 by North All-Stars and South All-Stars, 2019
- Most points in a half:
  - 95 by Veterans vs. Rookies-Sophomores-Juniors, 2012
- Most combined three-point field goals made
  - 45 by North All-Stars and South All-Stars, 2019
- Biggest winning margin
  - 32 by Veterans vs. Rookies-Sophomores-Juniors, 2012

=== PBA finals records ===
- Fewest points in a quarter:
  - 5 by San Miguel (2nd quarter) vs. Magnolia, May 15, 2019 (2019 Philippine Cup finals, Game 7)
  - 5 by Alaska (1st quarter) vs. San Miguel, January 7, 2015 (2014–15 Philippine Cup finals, Game 1)
- Fewest points in a half:
  - 19 by TNT (1st half) vs. Barangay Ginebra, March 16, 2025 (2024–25 Commissioner's Cup finals, Game 2)
- Most three-point field goals made:
  - 21 by TNT vs Barangay Ginebra, April 16, 2023 (2023 Governors' Cup finals, Game 4)
- Most consecutive unanswered points:
  - 32–0 (fourth quarter), from 80–85 (8:31) to 112–85 (1:43), Ginebra 116, Shell 90, May 14, 1991 (1991 First Conference finals, Game 5)
- Fewest turnovers:
  - 3 by TNT vs San Miguel, August 29, 2022 (2022 Philippine Cup finals, Game 4)
- Biggest winning margin:
  - 38 by San Miguel (132) vs. Barangay Ginebra (94), August 1, 2018 (2018 Commissioner's Cup finals, Game 3)
  - 38 by Alaska (99) vs. San Miguel (61), May 5, 1998 (1998 PBA All-Filipino Cup finals, Game 6)

== Team season records ==
- Most consecutive wins: 21 by the 1983 Crispa Redmanizers (12 in the All-Filipino Conference, 9 in the Reinforced Filipino Conference; March 10 – June 19, 1983)
- Most consecutive wins in a conference: 19 by the 1980 Crispa Redmanizers (All-Filipino Conference, September 30 – December 9, 1980)
- Most consecutive losses: 29 by the 2020–2022 Blackwater Elite/Bossing (8 games in the 2020 Philippine Cup, all 11 games in the 2021 Philippine Cup; 10 games in the 2021 Governors' Cup; October 20, 2020 – March 4, 2022)
- Most consecutive losses in a conference: 14 by the 2011–12 Shopinas.com Clickers (Philippine Cup) (October 5 – December 8, 2011)

== Individual career records ==
- Most seasons played:
  - 24 by Asi Taulava
- Most seasons played on one team:
  - 20 by (Philippines) Mark Caguioa
- Most points:
  - 18,996 by (Philippines) Ramon Fernandez in 1,074 games
  - 11,314 by (United States) Norman Black in 282 games
- Most assists:
  - 5,825 by (Philippines) Robert Jaworski
- Best scoring average per game:
  - 46.2 by (United States) Billy Ray Bates
  - 23.1 by (Philippines) Ricardo Brown
- Most games:
  - 1,081 by (Philippines) Abet Guidaben
- Most free throws:
  - 3,848 by (Philippines) Ramon Fernandez
- Most consecutive free throw shots made:
  - 76 by (Philippines) Allan Caidic
- Best free throw percentage:
  - 87.6% by (Philippines) Ricardo Brown
- Most three-point field goals made in a career:
  - 1,254 by (Philippines) Marcio Lassiter
- Youngest player:
  - 18 years old – (Philippines) Nick Bulaong
- Oldest player:
  - 53 years old – (Philippines) Robert Jaworski

=== All-Star Game records ===
- Most selections:
  - 18 by James Yap
- Most MVP awards:
  - 4 by Vergel Meneses (1995, 1998, 2000, 2003)

== League single-game records ==
- Longest game: 3 overtimes (14 occasions)
  - 2023–24 PBA Commissioner's Cup quarterfinals – Meralco Bolts vs. Phoenix Super LPG Fuel Masters – 116–107 (January 17, 2024, PhilSports Arena, Pasig)
  - 2019 PBA Governors' Cup quarterfinals – NorthPort Batang Pier vs. NLEX Road Warriors – 126–123 (November 27, 2019, Smart Araneta Coliseum, Quezon City)
  - 2017–18 PBA Philippine Cup – Barangay Ginebra San Miguel vs. Rain or Shine Elasto Painters – 100–92 (March 2, 2018, Smart Araneta Coliseum, Quezon City)
  - 2016 PBA Commissioner's Cup – San Miguel Beermen vs. NLEX Road Warriors – 131–127 (April 5, 2016, Smart Araneta Coliseum, Quezon City)
  - 2015 PBA Commissioner's Cup – Purefoods Star Hotshots vs. Talk 'N Text Tropang Texters – 118–117 (March 14, 2015, University of the South Eastern Philippines Gym, Davao)
  - 2010–11 PBA Philippine Cup – Meralco Bolts vs. Rain or Shine Elasto Painters – 125–124 (December 15, 2010, Araneta Coliseum, Quezon City)
  - 2006–07 PBA Philippine Cup – Purefoods Chunkee Giants vs. Talk 'N Text Phone Pals – 109–103 (October 25, 2006)
  - 2004–05 PBA Philippine Cup classification round – Red Bull Barako vs. Sta. Lucia Realtors – 124–118 (October 26, 2004, University of St. La Salle Gymnasium, Bacolod)
  - 2004 PBA Fiesta Conference – Red Bull Barako vs. Purefoods TJ Hotdogs – 141–138 (May 22, 2004, Ynares Center, Antipolo)
  - 1993 PBA Governors' Cup semifinals – Sta. Lucia Realtors vs. San Miguel Beermen – 135–129 (November 9, 1993, Cuneta Astrodome, Pasay)
  - 1990 PBA Third Conference – Purefoods Hotdogs vs. Pepsi Hotshots – 182–178 (October 4, 1990, The ULTRA, Pasig)
  - 1984 PBA Invitational Championship – Great Taste Coffee Makers vs. Gilbey's Gin Tonics – 170–162 (December 6, 1984, Araneta Coliseum, Quezon City)
  - 1983 PBA Open Conference – Toyota Super Corollas vs. Gilbey's Gin Tonics – 136–130 (October 30, 1983, Araneta Coliseum, Quezon City)
  - 1976 PBA Second Conference – Noritake Porcelainmakers vs. Tanduay Rhum – 153–151 (August 17, 1976, Araneta Coliseum, Quezon City)
- Largest attendance at a game:
  - 54,589 on January 15, 2023, Barangay Ginebra San Miguel vs. Bay Area Dragons at the Philippine Arena

== PBA D-League records ==
- Most points:
  - 180 by BRT Sumisip Basilan-St. Clare
- Most points (losing team)
  - 122 by Black Mamba Energy Drink
- Fewest points:
  - 41 by PC Gilmore Wizards
- Fewest points (winning team):
  - 50 by Big Chill Super Chargers
- Most points (combined):
  - 297 by BRT Sumisip Basilan-St. Clare and Hyperwash Vipers
- Fewest points (combined):
  - 96 by Jumbo Plastic Linoleum Giants and Big Chill Super Chargers
- Biggest winning margin:
  - 83 by EcoOil-La Salle vs AMA Online, May 25, 2023
- Most points in a quarter:
  - 60 by BRT Sumisip Basilan-St. Clare
- Fewest points in a quarter:
  - 2 by AMA Online
- Most points in a half:
  - 108 by BRT Sumisip Basilan-St. Clare
- Fewest points in a half:
  - 13 by Gamboa Coffee Lovers
- Longest winning streak:
  - 24 by NLEX Road Warriors
- Longest losing streak:
  - 15 by Topstar ZC Mindanao Aguilas
- Most points in a game (individual):
  - 67 by Eliud Poligrates
  - 67 by Jonathan Parreño
- Most rebounds in a game (individual):
  - 29 by Jay-R Taganas
