= 1983 PBA Reinforced Filipino Conference =

- Duration: May 15 – August 23, 1983
- TV partner(s): Vintage Sports (City2)

Finals
- Champions: Crispa Redmanizers
- Runners-up: Great Taste Discoverers

Awards
- Best Import: Billy Ray Bates (Crispa Redmanizers)

PBA Reinforced Filipino Conference chronology
- < 1982

PBA conference chronology
- < 1983 All-Filipino 1983 Open >

The 1983 Philippine Basketball Association (PBA) Reinforced Filipino Conference was the second conference of the 1983 PBA season. It started on May 15 and ended on August 23, 1983. The tournament is an import-laden format, which requires an import with the height limit of 6"5' and below for each team.

== Format ==
The following format will be observed for the duration of the conference:

- Double-round eliminations; 14 games per team; Teams are then seeded by basis on win–loss records.
- The two teams at the bottom of the standings after the elimination round will be eliminated. The top two teams will advance outright to the semifinals.
- The next four teams will qualify in a single round robin quarterfinals; The top two teams will advance to the semifinals.
- Semifinals will be a double round robin affair with the four remaining teams.
- The top two teams in the semifinals advance to the best-of-five finals. The last two teams dispute the third-place trophy in a best-of-five playoff.

== Elimination round ==
Pos	Team	W	L	PCT	GB	Qualification
1	Crispa Redmanizers	11	3	.786	—	Advance to semifinal round
2	Great Taste Discoverers	10	4	.714	1	Advance to semifinal round
3	Tanduay Rhum Makers	7	7	.500	4	Proceed to quarterfinal round
4	Toyota Silver Coronas	7	7	.500	4	Proceed to quarterfinal round
5	Gilbey's Gin Gimlets	7	7	.500	4	Proceed to quarterfinal round
6	San Miguel Beermen	6	8	.429 (Note: Quarterfinal round berth playoff: San Miguel 119–103 Sunkist)	5	Proceed to quarterfinal round
7	Sunkist Orange Lovers	6	8	.429	5	
8	Galerie Dominique Artists	2	12	.143	9	

== Quarterfinal round berth playoff ==
Vintage

July 17

San Miguel Beermen 119, Sunkist Orange Lovers 103

Araneta Coliseum, Quezon City

== Quarterfinal round ==
Pos	Team	W	L	PCT	GB	Qualification
3	Gilbey's Gin Gimlets	3	0	1.000	—	Semifinal round
4	Tanduay Rhum Makers	2	1	.667	1	Semifinal round
5	San Miguel Beermen	1	2	.333	2	
6	Toyota Silver Coronas	0	3	.000	3	

== Semifinal round ==
Pos	Team	W	L	PCT	GB	Qualification
1	Crispa Redmanizers	4	2	.667 (Note: Head-to-head quotient: Crispa 1.018, Great Taste 1.006, Gilbey's 0.974; second-seed playoff: Great Taste 129–123 Gilbey's)	—	Advance to the Finals
2	Great Taste Discoverers	4	2	.667	—	Advance to the Finals
3	Gilbey's Gin Gimlets	4	2	.667	—	Proceed to third-place playoff
4	Tanduay Rhum Makers	0	6	.000	4	Proceed to third-place playoff

== Second seed playoff ==
Vintage

August 9

Great Taste Coffee Makers 129, Gilbey's Gin Gimlets 123

Araneta Coliseum, Quezon City

== Third place playoffs ==
Vintage

August 11

Tanduay Rhum Makers 131, Gilbey's Gin Gimlets 134

Araneta Coliseum, Quezon City

Vintage

August 14

Tanduay Rhum Makers 136, Gilbey's Gin Gimlets 118

Araneta Coliseum, Quezon City

Vintage

August 16

Tanduay Rhum Makers 132, Gilbey's Gin Gimlets 127

Araneta Coliseum, Quezon City

Vintage

August 18

Tanduay Rhum Makers 135, Gilbey's Gin Gimlets 121
Tanduay wins series, 3–1

Araneta Coliseum, Quezon City

== Finals ==
Vintage

August 11

Crispa Redmanizers 128, Great Taste Coffee Makers 135

Araneta Coliseum, Quezon City

Vintage

August 14

Crispa Redmanizers 105, Great Taste Coffee Makers 102

Araneta Coliseum, Quezon City

Vintage

August 16

Crispa Redmanizers 123, Great Taste Coffee Makers 128

Araneta Coliseum, Quezon City

Vintage

August 18

Crispa Redmanizers 142, Great Taste Coffee Makers 113

Araneta Coliseum, Quezon City

Vintage

August 23

Crispa Redmanizers 139, Great Taste Coffee Makers 120
Crispa wins series, 3–2

Araneta Coliseum, Quezon City
