= One-game playoff =

Tiebreaker in some sports

A one-game playoff, sometimes known as a pennant playoff, tiebreaker game or knockout game, is a tiebreaker in certain sports—usually but not always professional—to determine which of two teams, tied in the final standings, will qualify for a post-season tournament. Such a playoff is either a single game or a short series of games (such as best-2-of-3).

This is distinguished from the more general usage of the term "playoff", which refers to the post-season tournament itself.

== Major League Baseball ==
One-game playoffs were used in Major League Baseball (MLB) through the 2021 season. When two or more MLB teams were tied for a division championship or the wild card playoff berth (1995–2011, or starting in 2012, the second only) at the end of the regular season, a one-game playoff was used to determine the winner.

If a tie were (from 1995 to 2011) a two-way tie for a division championship and both tied teams' have records higher than those records of the second-place teams in the other divisions, or (from 2012) between the two division non-champions with the untied best record, no one-game playoff was played. In this scenario, the winner of the season series between the two teams wins the tiebreaker for purposes of playoff seeding. Through the 2008 season, home-field advantage for one-game playoffs was determined by a coin flip, but effective from 2009, home advantage was based on a set of performance criteria, with the first tiebreaker being head-to-head record.

For statistical purposes, one-game playoffs were considered part of the regular season. In a 162-game regular season, a one-game playoff was often referred to as "game 163". The result of the playoff was included in the regular season standings and individual player statistics were included along with the statistics for the rest of the season. One significant playoff-like deviation from normal regular season games in force as of 2007 was that six-man umpire crews were used (as opposed to the four-man crews of the regular season). Also, television broadcasting rights for all were negotiated by MLB – from 2012 to 2021, the network owning the rights to the Wild Card Game for a particular league has also had the rights to any tiebreaker(s) that might occur in that league.

MLB scheduling practices stipulated a break of at least one day between the scheduled end of the regular season and the start of the postseason. The schedule was designed to maximize the probability that tiebreakers could take place on the day after the scheduled end of the regular season with no alterations to the postseason schedule needing to be made as a result. Nevertheless, the schedule could have been disrupted if rain-outs or other such events disrupted the schedule near the end of the season or on the day set aside for tiebreakers, and the tie-breaking procedure and scheduling would have become more complicated if three or more teams had tied. That would have required a series of one-game playoffs, taking more than one day. A series of one-game playoffs would have also been necessary if teams had tied for their division title also tied for the second wild card – in such a case, the division title would have been settled first, with the loser of that game then contesting a tiebreaker for the last wild card berth. There have been several occasions where such scenarios were possible as late as the last game of the season, but it never happened. To provide some additional flexibility in case of make-up games and/or complicated playoff scenarios, an additional break of one day was always scheduled between the wild card game and the start of the Division Series in each league.

Starting in 2012, with the Wild Card game between the top two teams who did not win their division, if two teams tie for a division title and both are in the playoffs, a one-game playoff was held because it would determine which team advances to the Division Series, and the loser would play in the wild card game only if its regular-season record since it was among the league's two best records for non-division-winners. When two teams tied for the top two wild card positions, an extra game was not held – performance-based criteria were used in that case to determine the home team for the Wild Card Game.

Finally, although tiebreaker games counted in the regular season standings and ultimately reflected in the team’s final records, they did not count for the purposes of determining subsequent postseason qualification, seeding, and home-field advantage. For example, if two teams had tied for their division title and also tied with the runner-up of another division for the wild card, the loser of the division tiebreaker would have still hosted the team tied for the wild card (whether in another tiebreaker for the second wild card or in the Wild Card Game itself) based on performance-based criteria, even though in that scenario though they would have technically lost one more regular season game and therefore be a half game behind in the standings. However, if a team in such a scenario had lost a divisional tiebreaker and then won a tiebreaker for the second wild card, it would have actually finished a half game behind the division winner and a half game ahead of third place in the wild card standings.

Avoiding any confusion with the term "Playoffs" as the often used but unofficial name of MLB's post-season tournament, the term "Tiebreaker" was MLB's preferred term for a one-game playoff.

Beginning with the 2022 season, MLB eliminated tiebreakers while expanding the postseason to six teams per league.

=== History ===
Through the 2013 MLB season, there have been 14 occasions where a tiebreaker was needed in a league, division, or wild card race. Of these tiebreakers, ten have been one-game playoffs and the other four were best-of-three playoffs. Prior to the advent of divisional play in 1969, the National League broke ties for its league championship with a best-of-three-games playoff – incidentally, all four of these series were ultimately won by the team that won the first game. The American League has always used one-game playoffs.

Prior to the advent of the wild card playoff system in 1994, all five pennant playoffs in the National League had involved the Brooklyn/Los Angeles Dodgers (who won the coin toss for home field advantage all five times, yet lost every year except 1959), and both American League playoffs had involved the Boston Red Sox (who hosted both and lost both).

The 2018 season was the first to see two one-game playoffs, both for division titles (the NL Central and NL West) – the first time divisional one-game playoffs were needed at all since the MLB postseason expanded to ten teams. Both were in the National League and meant that the Game 163 winners won the division and advanced to the LDS, while the losers met each other in the Wild Card Game. Under the pre-2012 format, only the NL West tiebreaker would have been played since the NL Central runner-up would have been assured the Wild Card. It was the first time that the loser of a tiebreaker game still qualified for the postseason.

=== No playoff needed ===
Since the advent of the wild card in 1995, there have been three occasions on which a tiebreaker was not played as the two teams that were tied for a division lead and the wild card. In 2001, the Houston Astros and St. Louis Cardinals tied for first in the National League Central with records of 93–69. In 2005, the New York Yankees and Boston Red Sox each finished 95–67 in the American League East. In 2006, the San Diego Padres and Los Angeles Dodgers finished tied with records of 88–74 in the National League West. The team with the better head-to-head record (the 2001 Astros, 2005 Yankees, and 2006 Padres) was declared the division champion, thus receiving a better seed in the postseason. The other team was seeded as the wild card.

Since 2012, when the Wild Card Game was introduced, if two teams are tied for the first Wild Card spot, no tie-breaking game was played. Rather, both teams simply played each other in the Wild Card Game, with the team winning the regular season series hosting the Wild Card Game. (Note: Note that when the head-to-head matchup was a draw, home-field advantage in all scenarios listed below went to the team with the superior intradivision record or, failing that, the team with the better intraleague record.) This has occurred in 2012 (Baltimore Orioles and Texas Rangers were both 93–69; Texas hosted the game due to winning the season series 5–2), 2014 (Pittsburgh Pirates and San Francisco Giants were both 88–74; Pittsburgh hosted due to winning the season series 4–2), 2016 (Baltimore Orioles and Toronto Blue Jays were both 89–73; Toronto hosted due to winning the season series 4–3; also San Francisco Giants and New York Mets were both 85–77; New York hosted due to winning the season series), and 2021 (Boston Red Sox and New York Yankees were both 92–70; Boston hosted due to winning the season series 10–9). Previously, these matchups would have served as tiebreaker games.

=== Make-up games ===
On some occasions a previously postponed game may be made up at the end of the season to settle entry into the playoffs. Although such a game is technically a mere regular-season game, it can have the effect and feel of a playoff.

On September 23, 1908, Johnny Evers of the Chicago Cubs capitalized on a base-running mistake by young Fred Merkle of the New York Giants to invalidate a game-ending winning run. As thousands of fans were on the field and darkness was approaching, the game did not immediately resume. As it turned out, the Cubs and Giants ended the season in a tie for the pennant, and the postponed game was replaced by a new game played on October 8, 1908, at the Polo Grounds. The Cubs prevailed 4–2, and advanced to the 1908 World Series.

In 2008, the Chicago White Sox ended the season 1/2 game behind the Minnesota Twins for the American League Central division title. The fractional difference was due to the September 13 game between the White Sox and the Detroit Tigers, which had been rained out and not yet rescheduled. To determine whether, if the game had not been rained out, there would have been a tie between the Twins and White Sox, the White Sox and Tigers played the make-up game at the end of the season on September 29. The White Sox won, resulting in a tie that necessitated playing a one-game playoff in Chicago, which the White Sox won 1–0. Make-up games were also played after the season's end in 1973 and 1981.

This scenario was almost required in 2006 had the Astros won their final game of the season against the Braves. The Cardinals, who won the NL Central despite only playing 161 games, would have been required to play a makeup game in San Francisco in this case as their September 17 game against the Giants was postponed (and subsequently canceled after the Cardinals won the division). The Cardinals would have won the division in the case of this makeup game victory, but a tiebreaker game against Houston would have been required had they lost.

Between 1901 and 1938, during a time when games were more often delayed by darkness and not always made up, there have been at least nine occasions on which making up postponed games might have resulted in a different pennant outcome, but the games were not made up. Even today, make-up games that cannot be played before the scheduled end of the regular season are only played if there is a possibility their results could affect postseason qualification.

== National Football League ==
The National Football League (NFL) now has an elaborate formula for breaking ties in the qualification for its playoffs, and in the highly unlikely event that two teams are tied in all enumerated statistical criteria, the rules stipulate that a coin toss settles the tie, meaning one game playoffs are no longer possible.

However, before the merger of the NFL and the American Football League (AFL) in 1970, it was possible to have a playoff game if two teams tied for a division title. The NFL had nine of these playoffs occur between 1941 and 1965, and the AFL, whose records were fully integrated with the NFL's upon merger, had two such playoffs (1963, 1968). The All-America Football Conference (AAFC), which merged with the NFL after the 1949 season, also held a playoff tiebreaker game in 1948, but unlike the AFL's playoff games, the AAFC's records are not recognized by the older league.

The Chicago Bears and the Portsmouth Spartans of the NFL tied for first place at the end of the 1932 season, and as both their games ended in ties, they held an extra game to determine the champion. Unlike subsequent post-season playoffs, this game was considered part of the regular season, as per baseball tie-breaking playoff games described above.

The great interest generated by the 1932 playoff game led the NFL to split into two divisions in 1933, and began playing a single post-season NFL Championship game. If two teams in a single division tied for first place, the rules also provided for a one-game tie-breaking playoff to determine which team would advance to the league championship game.

The NFL did have at least one tiebreaker prior to this, one that came into play for determining the 1921 title; if two teams tied each other in the standings and played twice, each winning one, then the winner of the second game won the title. This was of no use in 1932 because the Bears and Spartans had tied each other in their two matchups that year, and the NFL abandoned it.

This was the practice from 1933 through 1966; unlike the 1932 contest, these tiebreakers were not part of the regular season's standings.

The league's last one-game playoff occurred in 1965; in 1967, when it split into four divisions, it was deemed unfeasible to continue the traditional one game playoffs since the World Championship Game against the AFL was scheduled for a specific day at a neutral site. Since then the NFL has used a set of tiebreaking rules to break ties.

The AFL did not immediately follow suit since it was still a two division league, therefore there was room in the schedule to accommodate a divisional tiebreaker. The last tiebreaker game in professional football was played in the 1968, when the Oakland Raiders defeated the Kansas City Chiefs to win the West and set up a rematch of the famous Heidi Game against the New York Jets. The Jets, who had won the East outright, defeated the Raiders and went on to stun the heavily favored NFL champion Baltimore Colts in Super Bowl III.

Besides simply dismissing the Jets' win as a "fluke" NFL loyalists, smarting from the shock defeat to the Jets, complained that the Jets had benefited from an "unfair" advantage since they were the only playoff team in professional football with a bye in the Divisional round. Under pressure from NFL Commissioner Pete Rozelle (whom the AFL had recognized as the overall chief executive of pro football when the merger was first agreed in 1966), the AFL agreed to adopt tiebreakers until its final season before the merger, and also to grant division runners-up a playoff berth, so as to ensure the NFL and AFL champions would play an equal number of games. Ultimately, there were no ties in the 1969 AFL season for first or second place, and the AFL champion Chiefs (who were AFL West runners-up) nevertheless defeated the Minnesota Vikings to win Super Bowl IV.

Today in the NFL, division winners and playoff qualifiers are technically determined by winning percentage, not by number of wins.

Prior to 1972, ties did not count for the purposes of this calculation. So, for example, if one team finished 11–3 and another 10–2–2, there was no tiebreaker, as the team with two ties would have been deemed the outright division winners. This made tie games, a fairly common occurrence in football before overtime was introduced in 1974, somewhat more valuable to teams compared to the half-win they are considered today.

Today, two ties are of exactly equal strength to a win for the purpose of breaking ties since, unlike many other North American leagues, the current NFL tiebreaking criteria do not prioritize one win over two ties (or vice versa) in any way. However, since the introduction of overtime beginning with the 1974 regular season this has been essentially an academic point since no team has ever tied more than once in a season during the overtime era.

Both the NFL and AFL had provisions prior to their merger to allow for two weeks of one-game playoffs if three or four teams tied for a division title. Despite the relatively high probability of such a tie happening in a 12 or 14-game schedule compared to a longer season, this scenario never took place prior to the abolition of one-game playoffs.

The closest a three-way tie for a division came to happening was in 1957 when the Detroit Lions, San Francisco 49ers, and Baltimore Colts all entered the final week of the season with identical 7–4 records. With none of those three teams playing each other in the last week, a three-way tie seemed likely until the Colts lost, leaving the Lions and 49ers to contest the playoff between themselves; the Lions went on to win the NFL championship, their last as of 2024. A somewhat similar situation occurred in 1950, when there was a tie in both divisions, requiring two playoffs.

While there are no one-game playoffs in the NFL today, current scheduling practices (which include exclusively intradivisional matchups at the end of the season), combined with the NFL's short schedule, make it possible that the last week of the regular season will include a winner-take-all game between two teams, which has the effect and feel of a one-game playoff. Typically, such games will be scheduled for prime time under the NFL's flexible scheduling policy (provided their result does not carry potential playoff implications for other teams; the NFL's current scheduling rules dictate that games with mutual playoff implications in the final week of the season must start at the same time).

For example, the New York Giants and Dallas Cowboys entered the final week of the 2011 NFL season tied at 8–7 for first place in the NFC East. The teams, scheduled to play in Dallas, were both out of contention for a wild card berth, meaning the winner of the game would win the division, while the loser would miss the playoffs altogether. The Giants defeated the Cowboys and went on to win the Super Bowl.

=== NFL tiebreaker playoffs ===
Year	Division (Note: While tie-breaker games were in use, NFL teams were grouped into two divisions (1933–1966))	Winning team	Losing team	Score	Championship Game
1941	West	**Chicago Bears**	Green Bay Packers	33–14	**Bears** defeated the New York Giants, 37–9
1943	East	Washington Redskins	**New York Giants**	28–0	Redskins lost to the **Chicago Bears**, 41–21
1947	East	Philadelphia Eagles	**Pittsburgh Steelers**	21–0	Eagles lost to the **Chicago Cardinals**, 28–21
1950	American	**Cleveland Browns**	New York Giants	8–3	**Browns** defeated the Rams, 30–28
1950	National	**Los Angeles Rams**	Chicago Bears	24–14	**Browns** defeated the Rams, 30–28
1952	National	**Detroit Lions**	Los Angeles Rams	31–21	Lions defeated the **Cleveland Browns**, 17–7
1957	West	Detroit Lions	**San Francisco 49ers**	31–27	**Lions** defeated the Cleveland Browns, 59–14
1958	East	**New York Giants**	Cleveland Browns	10–0	**Giants** lost to the Baltimore Colts, 23–17 (OT)
1965	West	**Green Bay Packers**	Baltimore Colts	13–10 ^{(OT)}	**Packers** defeated the Cleveland Browns, 23–12

- Home teams in **bold**

=== AFL tiebreaker playoffs ===
Year	Division	Winning team	Losing team	Score	Championship Game
1963	East	Boston Patriots	**Buffalo Bills**	26–8	Patriots lost to the **San Diego Chargers**, 51–10
1968	West	**Oakland Raiders**	Kansas City Chiefs	41–6	Raiders lost to the **New York Jets**, 27–23

- Home team in **bold**

=== AAFC one-game playoff ===
Year	Division	Winning team	Losing team	Score	Championship Game
1948	East	Buffalo Bills (Note: Not to be confused with the present-day Buffalo Bills or Indianapolis Colts, the latter of whom were originally based in Baltimore and joined the NFL three years after the AAFC Colts folded, while the current Buffalo Bills joined the NFL (from the AFL) 20 years after the AAFC team folded.)	**Baltimore Colts**	28–17	Bills lost to the Cleveland Browns, 49–7

- Home team in **bold**

== Canadian Football League ==
Like in the NFL, one-game tiebreaking playoffs were a regular feature in the early years of the provincial competitions that were eventually consolidated into today's Canadian Football League in 1958. They were abandoned in the mid-1930s as Canadian football evolved from consisting of provincial leagues to two regional conferences (the Interprovincial Rugby Football Union and Western Interprovincial Football Union). Previously, the regional Eastern and Western champions that played in the Grey Cup were determined by playoffs between the winners of each region's leagues. These regional playoffs were sufficiently popular (and the teams were so dependent on gate receipts in the then-short season available to play football in Canada) that the regional conferences implemented a format that ensured playoffs were contested every season as opposed to only those where ties needed to be broken.

The current tiebreaking criteria are substantially different in the CFL compared to the NFL, although like the NFL it culminates in a coin toss in the highly unlikely event all specified performance-based criteria cannot break a tie at the end of the regular season. Also unlike the NFL (which determines its standings strictly by winning percentage only), the CFL and its antecedent competitions have always awarded "points" in the standings in the same manner as is done in ice hockey (which is by far Canada's most popular sport) as well as other codes of football especially rugby from which the gridiron codes evolved. Teams receive two points for a win and one for a tie. Starting in 2000, the CFL also experimented with awarding a point for an overtime loss as is typically done in hockey today, but dropped the "OTL" point after only three seasons. A tie has therefore always effectively counted as a "half-win" in the standings in Canadian football, with the caveat that in all tie-breakers in force since the end of tiebreaking playoffs, the first tiebreaker (other than for determining a crossover team) has always been number of wins (same as in hockey) whereas, as mentioned earlier, number of wins compared to ties has never been a tiebreaking criterium in the NFL.

== National Basketball Association ==
In its early years, the National Basketball Association held tie-breaker games at the end of the season, if necessary. The first two games (a three team playoff) were played during the 1947–48 season, the league's second year in existence, when it was still known as the Basketball Association of America. The second of these, however, was only used to determine the playoff seeding for the Chicago Stags and Baltimore Bullets. In fact, five of the eight one-game playoffs in NBA history were used for seeding purposes, and both teams advanced to the playoffs despite the outcome.

The American Basketball Association, which formed in 1967, did not hold a tie-breaker game in its first season, when the Kentucky Colonels and New Jersey Americans (later known as the New York Nets, New Jersey Nets, and currently as the Brooklyn Nets) tied for fourth place in the Eastern Division with a record of 36–42. A game was scheduled between the two teams in New Jersey, but the Americans' facility was booked and the replacement site picked by the team was in such poor condition that they were forced to forfeit the game by the league office. The Colonels were given the playoff spot despite going just 4–7 against the Americans during the regular season. The next time two teams finished tied for the final playoff spot in a division, the ABA did hold a tie-breaker game. The ABA would later merge with the NBA, with four teams from the ABA joining the NBA: the Denver Nuggets, Indiana Pacers, New York Nets and San Antonio Spurs.

=== NBA one game playoffs ===
Home team in bold.

Year	Division	Winning team	Losing team	Score	Afterward
1947–48	West tie-breaker	**Chicago Stags**	Washington Capitols	74–70	Second game was for seeding purposes only, and both teams advanced to the playoffs. Stags lost to the Bullets in the semifinals. Bullets defeated the Philadelphia Warriors in the BAA Finals.
1947–48	West 2nd place	Baltimore Bullets (Note: Not to be confused with the modern day Washington Wizards, who were known as the Baltimore Bullets from 1965 to 1973)	**Chicago Stags**	75–72	Second game was for seeding purposes only, and both teams advanced to the playoffs. Stags lost to the Bullets in the semifinals. Bullets defeated the Philadelphia Warriors in the BAA Finals.
1949–50	Central 1st place	Minneapolis Lakers	**Rochester Royals**	78–76	This game was for the division title only, and both teams still advanced to the playoffs. Royals lost the Fort Wayne Pistons in the Central Division Semifinals. Lakers defeated the Syracuse Nationals in the NBA Finals.
1955–56	East 3rd place	**Syracuse Nationals**	New York Knicks	82–77	Nationals lost to the Philadelphia Warriors in Eastern Division Finals.
1955–56	West 2nd place	Minneapolis Lakers	**St. Louis Hawks**	103–97	This game was for seeding purposes, and both teams advanced to the playoffs. Lakers lost to the Hawks in the Western Division semifinals. Hawks lost to the Fort Wayne Pistons in the Western Division Finals.
1956–57	West tie-breaker	**St. Louis Hawks**	Fort Wayne Pistons	115–103	These games were for seeding purposes, and all three teams advanced to the playoffs. Pistons lost to the Lakers in the Western Division Semifinals; Lakers lost to the Hawks in the Western Division Finals. Hawks lost to the Boston Celtics in the NBA Finals.
1956–57	West 1st place	**St. Louis Hawks**	Minneapolis Lakers	114–111 (OT)	These games were for seeding purposes, and all three teams advanced to the playoffs. Pistons lost to the Lakers in the Western Division Semifinals; Lakers lost to the Hawks in the Western Division Finals. Hawks lost to the Boston Celtics in the NBA Finals.

=== ABA one game playoffs ===
Home team in bold.

Year	Division	Winning team	Losing team	Score	Afterward
1967–68	East 4th place	Kentucky Colonels	**New Jersey Americans**	1–0 forfeit	Colonels lost to the Minnesota Muskies in the Eastern Division Semifinals
1970–71	West 4th place	Texas Chaparrals	**Denver Rockets**	115–109	Chaparrals lost to the Utah Stars in the Western Division Semifinals
1973–74	West 4th place	San Diego Conquistadors	**Denver Rockets**	131–111	Conquistadors lost to the Utah Stars in the Western Division Semifinals
1974–75	East 1st place	**Kentucky Colonels**	New York Nets	108–99	Colonels defeated the Memphis Sounds in the Eastern Division Semifinals, the Spirits of St. Louis in the Eastern Division Finals, and the Indiana Pacers in the ABA Championship Series. Nets lost to the Spirits of St. Louis in the Eastern Division Semifinals

The New Jersey Americans (now the Brooklyn Nets of the NBA) forfeited the 1968 playoff game to the Kentucky Colonels when the Commack Arena on Long Island, where the game was scheduled to be played, was deemed unsuitable due to a wet floor from a leaky ice hockey surface.

== National Hockey League ==
Though the National Hockey League, currently the only major professional ice hockey league in North America, has never actually held a one-game playoff in its century long existence, its current playoff qualification rules explicitly allow for the possibility. Under current rules, a tie between two teams for a conference's final playoff berth (this being the third place seed of a division or the second wild card seed of a conference under the current format) can only be broken by the following tie-breakers:

1. The greater number of regulation wins only (used since the 2019–20 NHL season, reflected by the RW statistic).
2. The greater number of regulation and overtime wins, excluding shootouts (used since the 2010–11 NHL season, reflected by the ROW statistic).
3. The greater number of total wins, including shootouts.
4. The greater number of points earned in games between the tied clubs. head-to-head results,
  1. If two clubs are tied, and have not played an equal number of home games against each other, the points earned and available in the first game played in the city of the club that had the greater number of home games in games between the two are not included.
  2. If more than two clubs are tied, the higher percentage of available points earned in games among those clubs, and not including any "odd" games, are used to determine the standing. The "odd" games are identical to those mentioned in the previous paragraph, that is, the first game in the city of the club that has had more home games in games between each club in the tie. Note that, because of this procedure, if two teams in the multi team tie (also applicable in a two team tie) have only played once against each other, the points earned in that game are not included.
5. The greater differential between goals for and goals against during the entire regular season.
6. The greater number of goals for (used since the 2019–20 NHL season, reflected by the GF statistic).
7. If two clubs are still tied on all six tiebreakers listed above, a one-game playoff is played under Stanley Cup playoff rules.

Prior to the 2005 introduction of the shootout in the NHL, ROW was simply referred to as "wins" for tiebreaker purposes. The right to host such a game would be determined by a random draw.

Like in MLB, such a game in the NHL is considered a regular season game for statistical purposes except that the points earned do not count for playoff seeding purposes – in other words, the winner entered playoffs as the second wild card or third place in the division even if the two points they earned nominally caused them to otherwise tie or overtake other qualifying teams in total points, and the loser entered as a wild card team even if they lost in overtime and the single point they earned nominally allowed them to do the same in that manner but only if its regular-season record was among the conference’s two best records for teams finishing outside top 3 of their division. If that team were tied for the second wild-card spot, a second tie-breaking game must be played. The other main difference from an ordinary regular season game is that playoff overtime rules (that is, 5-on-5, unlimited 20-minute overtime periods with no shootout until one team scores) is used if necessary.

A one-game playoff is not held simply to determine playoff seeding and/or draft lottery position for non-playoff teams; league rules in these cases mandate a more exhaustive set of tiebreakers culminating in a random drawing to determine playoff seeding and/or final regular season standing. The more exhaustive set of tiebreakers is also used in the extremely unlikely event of three or more teams in a conference tied in points, RW, ROW, all wins, head-to-head results, overall goal differential, and overall goals scored. In this case, the more exhaustive criteria would be used to determine the club(s) which would qualify (in case of two available berths) or not qualify (in case of one available berth) without playing a one-game playoff, which would then be held between the two remaining teams if and only if they were also tied between each other in the criteria listed above, (e.g., intra-divisional and intra-conference record). It is therefore impossible for there to be three or more one-game playoffs in a conference in a particular season.

=== Recent scenarios ===
In its modern era, the NHL has provisionally scheduled a one-game playoff near the end of the regular season on two occasions. Neither such playoff proved to be necessary.

In 2000, the Buffalo Sabres and Montreal Canadiens entered the final weekend of the regular season with the possibility of being tied for the final playoff spot in the Eastern Conference and deadlocked on all relevant tiebreakers (wins, head-to-head results, and overall goal differential). The league announced that, if necessary, a tiebreaker game would be played the day after the regular season, but the Canadiens' loss in their final game, in regulation, rendered the point moot.

Likewise, in 2018, if the Florida Panthers had won their last two games via shootout and the Philadelphia Flyers lost their last game by exactly two goals, the teams would have been equal in all tiebreaker criteria, and they would have contested a play-in game for the second wild card in the Eastern Conference. This was avoided when the Flyers won their final game of the regular season and clinched the last playoff berth in the conference, eliminating Florida from playoff contention.

=== World Hockey Association ===
The NHL's most significant rival in its modern era, the World Hockey Association, actually held a one-game playoff. The playoff was hastily added at the end of the inaugural regular season after two teams, the Alberta Oilers (now Edmonton Oilers) and the Minnesota Fighting Saints tied for points, wins and head-to-head record, these being the only tie-breakers stipulated in WHA rules. The Fighting Saints defeated the Oilers in the game, which was played in Calgary. The ad hoc nature of the game was controversial. Had the NHL tiebreakers been in effect, the Oilers would have qualified for the playoffs since they had superior goal differential — critics argued that the real reason the league ordered the playoff was that they wanted to give the Fighting Saints an extra chance to qualify because they were playing in a large, brand new arena whereas the Oilers were playing in a small and antiquated facility.

As a footnote, the Fighting Saints went on to play the Winnipeg Jets, who defeated them four games to one. This would turn out to be the only hockey playoff series between any two professional teams representing these two relatively nearby geographical cross-border locales until the 2018 Stanley Cup playoffs. The 1972–73 season remains the only time a tiebreaking game has been played in a major North American hockey league. The WHA would later merge with the NHL, with four WHA franchises switching leagues: the Oilers, the Hartford Whalers (now the Carolina Hurricanes), the Quebec Nordiques (now the Colorado Avalanche), and the Jets (now the Arizona Coyotes and unrelated except in name and league affiliation to the current Winnipeg franchise).

=== WHA one game playoff ===
Year	Division	Winning team	Losing team	Site	Score	Afterward
1972–73	West 4th place	Minnesota Fighting Saints	Alberta Oilers	Stampede Corral, Calgary	4–2	Saints lost to the Winnipeg Jets in the Western Division Semifinals.

=== Western Canada Hockey League ===
The Edmonton Eskimos and Regina Capitals ended the 1921-22 season of the Western Canada Hockey League with identical records of 14–9–1 with the sole tie being between the two teams. To decide first place, it was agreed to replay the tie game. Edmonton won the rematch 11–2 to place first. Subsequently, the Capitals defeated the Calgary Tigers 2–1 (1–0, 1–1) in a two-game totals-goals series to determine second place. The Capitals then went on to beat first place Edmonton 3–2 (1–1, 2–1) in the league's first championship series. Regina then advanced to play the Pacific Coast Hockey Association champion Vancouver Millionaires in the Stanley Cup playoffs for the right to play in the 1922 Stanley Cup Finals.

== Ivy League basketball ==
In recent decades in U.S. college basketball, both men's and women's, most conferences have held tournaments to determine a winner who is awarded an automatic berth in the NCAA's postseason tournament. The Ivy League, however, was the last holdout in NCAA Division I—through the 2015–16 season, it continued to award its automatic NCAA tournament berth to the team with the best regular-season record in conference play. In case of a tie at the top of the standings, rules called for a one-game playoff, with the winner claiming the conference's automatic bid. If more than two teams were tied, a series of one-game playoffs was held. The Ivy League held its first postseason tournaments for both men and women at the end of the 2016–17 season, with the top four teams in the conference standings participating at a predetermined site.

In men's basketball, nine seasons ended in such a playoff, with the last being the 2014–15 season in which Harvard and Yale finished tied. The only time more than two teams finished tied atop the regular season standings was in the 2001–02 season, when Yale beat Princeton in the first one-game playoff, before losing to Penn. The last three-way playoff in women's basketball was in the 2007–08 season, in which Cornell, Dartmouth, and Harvard all finished at 11–3 in league play. It was determined that Dartmouth would play Harvard in the first playoff game, with the winner facing Cornell. Dartmouth won the first playoff game, with Cornell winning the playoff final.

== Curling ==
Tie-breaker games are the traditional method of resolving meaningful ties in round robin-style curling tournaments. This is a fairly common occurrence as such round robins rarely involve more than twelve games per team. However, unlike most other sports it is common for curling teams to play two or even (more rarely) three games in a day and tournaments are typically played in a single venue. Therefore, scheduling even multi-team tie-breakers is relatively easy to arrange in a typical bonspiel compared to many other league-based competitions.

=== Canadian championship curling ===
Canadian championship curling tournaments, of which the premier bonspiels are the Brier (for men) and the Tournament of Hearts (for women) use tie-breaker games when teams tie between qualifying and non-qualifying positions in the round robin standings. While the tie-breaker has always been a one-game playoff in cases where two teams have been tied, when the Brier was first held in the 1920s (long before the introduction of automatic playoffs) the tie-breaker would consist of an additional mini-round robin if more than two teams tied for the title. Later, as the Brier field became fixed as consisting of teams representing every province plus Northern Ontario, the tie-breaker evolved to consist of "semi-final" and "final" stages in cases of ties involving three or more teams. The last tie-breaker games for a Brier title before the introduction of automatic playoffs took place in 1971 when three teams tied for first place.

Prior to the introduction of automatic playoffs, tie-breaker games were only used to when needed to determine the champion. Since the introduction of automatic playoffs, tie-breaker games have only been used where qualification for the next stage of the tournament is at stake. Otherwise, the teams' best last stone draw records are compared to determine playoff seeding and final pool or tournament ranking. Since the introduction of pool play in 2018, one-game playoffs occur if teams are tied between fourth and fifth place in the pool stage (which determines qualification for the Championship Pool) and again if teams are tied between fourth and fifth place in the Championship Pool (which determines qualification for the playoffs). Unlike other pool stage games, tie-breaker results are not carried over by the winning team(s) to the Championship Pool.

Since the introduction of pool play, if the quotient of number of teams tied for multiple qualifying berths divided by the number of qualifying berths available is less than two, then the teams' last stone draw records are used to determine which team(s) advance(s) without having to play (a) tie-breaker game(s). For example, in case of a three-way tie for third, fourth and fifth then last stone draw records determine which team finishes third, leaving the remaining two teams to play a tie-breaker. On the other hand, teams cannot be eliminated solely on account of last stone draw records and as many tiebreakers as necessary will be played to determine which team(s) advance(s). In case of any tie-breaker involving three or more teams, last stone draw records are used to determine seeding which in turn determine (except in case of any sort of four-way tie) which team(s) receive(s) (a) bye(s).

Due to the relative frequency of tie-breakers, they are incorporated into the tournament schedule and played on the morning of the first day of the playoffs (typically a Saturday in the presently-used schedule). In case of any two-round tie-breaker, the final tie-breaker will be played at the same time as the "1 vs 2" game in the afternoon.

== Use in the Philippines ==
In the Philippines, the one-game playoff is also called a "knockout game" if it leads to elimination of the loser, or a "knockdown game" if the loser is not eliminated. In all instances, all games are held in mostly neutral venues, since the home-and-away system is not used in most leagues or competitions.

=== Philippine Basketball Association ===
As opposed to the usage in North America, in which one-game playoffs are held to determine a champion, in the Philippine Basketball Association (PBA), one-game playoffs are held when teams are tied in a last qualifying seed in the team standings. An extra game will be played to determine which team would be eliminated and which team will advance.

With the restructuring of the playoffs starting at the 2005–06 season, one game playoffs are also held which do not merit automatic elimination. When two teams are tied on the last qualifying seed for a stage (such as the No. 2 seed for the last semifinal berth), a classification game will be played to determine which team will clinch the higher seed. If the two teams are not tied on the last qualifying seed (such as the No. 1 seed where both teams are in the semifinals already), the points difference between the tied teams will be used to determine which team clinches the higher seed. Consequently, one-game playoffs that don't eliminate the loser are called "knockdown games."

Playoffs such as those after the 2004 restructuring are common due to the low number of games played in the regular conference or group stage (historically 14–18 games, but since the 2014–15 season, there are 12). In fact, each conference was able to feature at least one playoff game, until the 2007–08 PBA Philippine Cup where even though there were tied teams, the team's positions are not critical so they were resolved on the point differential among the tied teams' games. Only the playoffs for the last playoffs berth are included in the table below, where one team is eliminated from contention.

Starting from 2025–26 PBA Philippine Cup, the 8th seed playoff is no longer used and is instead replaced by new tiebreaker criteria:

- Head-to-head quotient (goal average)
- Head-to-head record
- Overall quotient
- Coin toss

The PBA cited scheduling and logistical reasons on why the playoff was scrapped.

==== Tiebreaker games after the elimination round ====
The following are one-game playoffs after the elimination round (analogous to a regular season elsewhere):

Season	Conference	Winning team	Losing team	Score	Afterward
1983	Reinforced Filipino	San Miguel Beermen	Sunkist Juice Lovers	119–103	Eliminated in the quarterfinal round
1983	Open	Tanduay Rhum Makers	Toyota Silver Corollas	111–110	Eliminated in the quarterfinal round
1986	All-Filipino	Alaska Milkmen	Philippine national team	100–96	Eliminated in the quarterfinal round
1987	Open	Formula Shell Spark Aiders	Philippine national team	120–111	Eliminated in the quarterfinal round
1989	Open	Alaska Milkmen	Añejo Rum 65ers	133–120	Eliminated in the semifinal round
1992	First	Swift Mighty Meaty Hotdogs	Purefoods Tender Juicy Hotdogs	123–117	Eliminated in the semifinal round
1992	Third	San Miguel Beermen	Shell Rimula X Zoomers	115–102	Eliminated in the semifinal round
1992	Third	Purefoods Tender Juicy Hotdogs	Alaska Milkmen	119–110	Eliminated in the semifinal round
1994	Governors'	Shell Rimula X Turbo Chargers	Tondeña 65 Rhum Masters	125–123 (OT)	Eliminated in the semifinal round
1996	Commissioner's	Purefoods Tender Juicy Hotdogs	Sunkist Orange Juicers	89–76	Eliminated in the semifinal round
1996	Governors'	Purefoods Tender Juicy Hotdogs	Sta. Lucia Realtors	81–76	Eliminated by San Miguel in the quarterfinals
1999	All-Filipino	Barangay Ginebra Kings	Sta. Lucia Realtors	77–74	Eliminated by Shell in the semifinals
2000	All-Filipino	Barangay Ginebra Kings	Shell Velocity	71–68	Eliminated by Tanduay in the quarterfinals
2001	Commissioner's	Mobiline Phone Pals	Shell Turbo Chargers	71–56	Eliminated by San Miguel in the quarterfinals
2002	All-Filipino	Sta. Lucia Realtors	Shell Velocity	70–69	Eliminated by Coca-Cola in the quarterfinals
2008–09	Fiesta	Coca-Cola Tigers	Alaska Aces	81–74	Eliminated by Sta. Lucia in the wildcard phase
2013–14	Philippine	Alaska Aces	Meralco Bolts	94–91	Eliminated by Barangay Ginebra in the quarterfinals
2015–16	Governors'	Phoenix Fuel Masters	Rain or Shine Elasto Painters	105–94	Eliminated by TNT in the quarterfinals
2016–17	Philippine	Rain or Shine Elasto Painters	Blackwater Elite	103–80	Eliminated by San Miguel in the quarterfinals
2016–17	Commissioner's	GlobalPort Batang Pier	Alaska Aces	107–106	Eliminated by Barangay Ginebra in the quarterfinals
2017–18	Philippine	TNT KaTropa	Phoenix Fuel Masters	118–97	Eliminated by San Miguel in the quarterfinals
2019	Philippine	Alaska Aces	NLEX Road Warriors	88–80	Eliminated by Phoenix in the quarterfinals
2019	Commissioner's	Alaska Aces	Meralco Bolts	108–103 (OT)	Eliminated by TNT in the quarterfinals
2021	Philippine	Barangay Ginebra San Miguel	Phoenix Super LPG Fuel Masters	95–85	Eliminated by TNT in the quarterfinals
2021	Governors	Phoenix Super LPG Fuel Masters	NorthPort Batang Pier	101–98	Eliminated by Magnolia in the quarterfinals
2022–23	Commissioner's	Rain or Shine Elasto Painters	NLEX Road Warriors	110–100	Eliminated by Bay Area in the quarterfinals
2023–24	Philippine	Terrafirma Dyip	NorthPort Batang Pier	104–96	Eliminated by San Miguel in the quarterfinals
2024–25	Commissioner's	Magnolia Hotshots	NLEX Road Warriors	112–81	Eliminated by NorthPort in the quarterfinals

==== Tiebreaker games after the round robin semifinals ====
The following are one-game playoffs to determine the #2 seed where two or more teams were tied.

Season	Conference	Winning team	Losing team	Score	Afterward
1981	Reinforced Filipino	Crispa Redmanizers	Presto Fun Drinks	119–114	Won championship against U-Tex
1982	Open	Toyota Super Corollas	N-Rick Coffee Creamers	114–87	Won championship against Gilbey's
1983	Reinforced Filipino	Great Taste Discovers	Gilbey's Gin Gimlets	129–123	Lost championship against Crispa
1983	Open	Crispa Redmanizers	San Miguel Beermen	130–120	Won championship against Great Taste
1983	Open	Great Taste Coffee Makers	Gilbey's Gin Gimlets	126–118	Lost championship against Crispa
1984	First All-Filipino	Gilbey's Gin Tonics	Beer Hausen Brewmasters	115–109	Lost championship against Crispa
1984	Second All-Filipino	Beer Hausen Brewmasters	Northern Cement	122–117 (OT)	Lost championship against Great Taste
1985	All-Filipino	Shell Azordin Bugbusters	Ginebra San Miguel	89–76	Lost championship against Great Taste
1985	Reinforced	Northern Cement	Great Taste Coffee Makers	123–107	Won championship against Manila Beer
1988	All-Filipino	Añejo Rhum 65ers	San Miguel Beermen	102–100	Won championship against Purefoods
1990	Third	Shell Rimula X	Presto Tivolis	137–114	Lost to Purefoods in the next round
1990	Third	Purefoods Hotdogs	Shell Rimula X	121–101	Won championship against Alaska
1993	Commissioner's	Purefoods Oodles	San Miguel Beermen	119–101	Lost championship against Swift
1993	Governors'	Swift Mighty Meaty Hotdogs	Pepsi Mega Bottlers	124–122 (2OT)	Lost championship against San Miguel
1998	Governors'	Mobiline Phone Pals	Purefoods Tender Juicy Hotdogs	84–80	Lost championship against Shell
1998	Governors'	Formula Shell Super Unleaded	San Miguel Beermen	87–83	Won championship against Mobiline

- In the 1983 PBA Open Conference and 1998 PBA Governors' Cup, all 4 semifinalists finished tied, with ties broken by quotient (goal average), then against each other in two one-game playoffs to determine the finalists.

==== Finals berth playoffs ====
In conferences where the semifinals is a round robin tournament, there were also ad hoc playoffs if a certain team wins a certain number of semifinal round games (20th century), or finished first solely in semifinal round standings (21st century), but did not finish in the top 2 places. That team will then have a playoff with the #2 team to determine the last finals berth. This is a akin more to a play-in game than a tiebreaker playoff.

=== College basketball ===
College basketball in the Philippines have had one-game playoffs as tiebreakers as early in 1930 in the National Collegiate Athletic Association (Philippines) (NCAA). In the NCAA, with its split season format, playoffs are done to break ties to determine a certain half-season's winner, or in certain seasons if another team has the best overall record aside from both half-seasons' winners. In the University Athletic Association of the Philippines (UAAP), playoffs are done if there's a tie in the top 2 berths.

With the expansion of the playoffs starting in 1993 in the UAAP, and in 1997 in the NCAA, one-game playoffs are held to break ties in any of the top 4 berths, although recently, both leagues have limited one-game playoffs for the #2 and #4 seeds.

Men's playoff results for the #4 seed since 1993 include:

Season	League	Winning team	Losing team	Score	Afterward
1998	UAAP	UST	UP	80–72	Eliminated by La Salle in the semifinals
2000	UAAP	UST	UE	65–61	Eliminated by La Salle in the semifinals
2001	UAAP	NU	UE	108–102 (2OT)	Eliminated by La Salle in the semifinals
2004	NCAA	San Beda	Mapua	59–52	Eliminated by Perpetual in the semifinals
2007	UAAP	UST	FEU	80–69	Eliminated by Ateneo in the stepladder semifinals first round
2008	NCAA	Mapua	San Sebastian	63–54	Eliminated by San Beda in the semifinals
2012	NCAA	Perpetual	JRU	73–68	Eliminated by San Beda in the semifinals
2012	UAAP	La Salle	FEU	69–66	Eliminated by Ateneo in the semifinals
2014	UAAP	NU	UE	51–49	Won championship against FEU
2015	NCAA	Mapua	Arellano	93–75	Eliminated by Letran in the semifinals
2017	NCAA	San Sebastian	Letran	74–69	Eliminated by San Beda in the stepladder semifinals second round
2017	NCAA	Letran	Arellano	70–68	Eliminated by San Sebastian in the elimination playoff second round
2018	UAAP	FEU	La Salle	71–70	Eliminated by Ateneo in the semifinals
2022	UAAP	Adamson	La Salle	76–80	Eliminated by Ateneo in the semifinals
2023	UAAP	Ateneo	Adamson	70–48	Eliminated by UP in the semifinals
2024	UAAP	Adamson	UE	68–55	Eliminated by La Salle in the semifinals

- In 2015, three teams were tied for No. 3 in the NCAA, and two rounds of playoffs were held: the first round for the No. 4 seed (loser is eliminated), and the second round for the No. 3 seed (loser is No. 4 seed).
- In 2017, there were three teams tied for No. 4 in the NCAA, leading to two rounds of playoffs for No. 4.

Ties may also broken when two teams are tied for third, second and first seeds, although the competing teams still qualify for the playoffs when they lose; a playoff game for the No. 2 seed serves as a de facto game 1 of a best-of-three series. The UAAP had depreciated for playoffs for the Nos. 1 and 3 seeds.

The UAAP has also used this format for the volleyball tournaments.

== Association football ==
A one-game playoff is at least theoretically possible in association football league competitions, where two teams competing for a significant prize are tied in all tie-breaking criteria. Most association football leagues only consider points, then goal difference and then goals scored when determining final standing. A few leagues also consider such criteria as head-to-head records, but this is not the norm. One-game playoffs are typically held in a neutral venue, often a national stadium especially for playoffs involving teams with large fanbases. The games are not counted in the regular season tables. Historically, a drawn one-game playoff would often result in a replay a few days later, although there have been occasions (such as in Scotland in 1891) where a draw resulted in the participants being declared joint champions. Today, most league competitions will use extra time and/or a penalty shootout to settle drawn one-game playoffs if needed.

For example, the Premier League announced that there would be a one-game playoff for third place between Arsenal and Chelsea if the two teams had finished exactly level at the end of the 2012–13 season. This would have been necessary because third place conferred automatic qualification for the group stage of the 2013–14 UEFA Champions League, whereas fourth place only led to a place in the final qualifying round of that competition. Before tiebreak rules such as goal difference were utilised, the Scottish league championships in 1891 and 1905 were determined by one game playoffs.

Until the 2004–05 season, the Italian Serie A had a one-game playoff called Spareggio, to determine the league champion if teams were tied in points at the end of the season, and also for the relegation. As of the 2022-23 season, Serie A has recovered the one-game playoff to decide the champion and relegation, and the one-game is without extra time, it goes straight to a penalty shoot-out.

Another example of a one-game playoff in association football would be a 2010 FIFA World Cup qualifying football match between Algeria and Egypt.

=== Lamar Hunt U.S. Open Cup ===
When the 2011 Premier Development League qualifiers in a region could not be settled by the four-stage qualifier of points, then wins, then goal difference, and goals scored, for the final position, the two teams, Kitsap Pumas and Portland Timbers U23's, agreed to discard the traditional lottery draw for the final slot and replace it with the result of their next scheduled game in the league also a one-game playoff to determine the final slot in the U. S. Open Cup. If the game ended in a tie, penalty kicks would be used to determine the U. S. Open Cup qualifier, but not for PDL standings.

== See also ==
- Play-in game, played regardless if teams are tied
