= 1983 PBA All-Filipino Conference =

- Duration: March 6 – April 24, 1983
- TV partner(s): Vintage Sports (City2)

Finals
- Champions: Crispa Redmanizers
- Runners-up: Gilbey's Gin Gimlets

PBA All-Filipino Conference chronology
- < 1980 1984 First >

PBA conference chronology
- < 1982 Open 1983 Reinforced Filipino >

The 1983 Philippine Basketball Association (PBA) All-Filipino Conference was the first conference of the 1983 PBA season. It started on March 6 and ended on April 24, 1983.

== Format ==
The following format will be observed for the duration of the conference:

- One-round eliminations; 7 games per team. The top four teams after the eliminations will advance to the semifinals.
- Semifinals will be just a single round robin affair with the four remaining teams and their won-loss records back to zero.
- The top two teams in the semifinals advance in the best-of-five finals series. The other two teams dispute the third-place trophy also in a best-of-five series.

== Elimination round ==
Pos	Team	W	L	PCT	GB	Qualification
1	Crispa Redmanizers	6	1	.857	—	Semifinal round
2	Great Taste Discoverers	5	2	.714	1	Semifinal round
3	Gilbey's Gin Gimlets	4	3	.571	2	Semifinal round
4	Toyota Silver Coronas	4	3	.571	2	Semifinal round
5	YCO-Tanduay	3	4	.429	3	
6	San Miguel Beermen	3	4	.429	3	
7	Manhattan Shirtmakers	2	5	.286	4	
8	Galerie Dominique Artists	1	6	.143	5	

== Semifinal round ==
Pos	Team	W	L	PCT	GB	Qualification
1	Crispa Redmanizers	3	0	1.000	—	Advance to the Finals
2	Gilbey's Gin Gimlets	2	1	.667	1	Advance to the Finals
3	Great Taste Discoverers	1	2	.333	2	Proceed to third place playoff
4	Toyota Silver Coronas	0	3	.000	3	Proceed to third place playoff

== Third place playoffs ==
Vintage

April 19

Great Taste Discoverers 139, Toyota Silver Coronas 128

Araneta Coliseum, Quezon City

Vintage

April 21

Great Taste Discoverers 126, Toyota Silver Coronas 136

Araneta Coliseum, Quezon City

Vintage

April 24

Great Taste Discoverers 131, Toyota Silver Coronas 126
Series aborted; Great Taste wins series by virtue of having more wins, 2–1, when series was aborted

Araneta Coliseum, Quezon City

== Finals ==
Vintage

April 19

Crispa Redmanizers 121, Gilbey's Gin 101

Araneta Coliseum, Quezon City

Vintage

April 21

Crispa Redmanizers 119, Gilbey's Gin 116

Araneta Coliseum, Quezon City

Vintage

April 24

Crispa Redmanizers 115, Gilbey's Gin 84
Crispa wins series, 3–0

Araneta Coliseum, Quezon City
