= 2001 Pasay local elections =

14th City elections in Pasay

2001 Pasay Mayoral Elections
- May 14, 2001
Nominee	Wenceslao Trinidad	Ricardo "Ding" Santos	Gregorio "Greg" Alcera
Party	LDP	PDP–Laban	Lakas
Running mate	Antonino Calixto	Joven Claudio	Danilo Roque
Popular vote	60,895	35,533	33,736
Percentage	46.58	27.18	25.81
Mayor before election
Wenceslao Trinidad
LAMMP
Elected mayor
Wenceslao Trinidad
LDP

Local elections were held in Pasay on May 14, 2001, within the Philippine general election. The voters elected for the elective local posts in the city: the mayor, vice mayor, the representative for the lone district, and the councilors, six of them in the two districts of the city.

== Background ==
Mayor Wenceslao Trinidad sought his first full term as mayor of the city. He was challenged by Vice Mayor Gregorio "Greg" Alcera, and former security aide of the late Mayor Pablo Cuneta, retired police Ricardo "Ding" Santos.

Vice Mayor Gregorio "Greg" Alcera ran as Mayor. His party chosen Danilo "Danny" Roque, a businessman. Roque was challenged by Second District Councilor Antonino Calixto, and Joven "Jojie" Claudio, son of former Mayor Jovito Claudio.

Representative Rolando "Ding" Briones ran for second term. He was challenged by Second District Councilor Ma. Consuelo "Connie" Dy, former Senator Freddie Webb, who became city's councilor from 1971 up to 1978, First District Councilor Panfilo "Justo" Justo, former tourism secretary Mina Gabor, and other candidates.

== Candidates ==
=== Team Trinidad-Calixto-Briones ===
Laban ng Demokratikong Pilipino/Nationalist People's Coalition/Team Trinidad-Calixto-Briones
Name	Party	Result
For House Of Representative
Ding Briones	NPC	Lost
For Mayor
Peewee Trinidad	LDP	Won
For Vice Mayor
Antonino Calixto	LDP	Won
For Councilor (1st District)
Ferdinand Angel	LDP	Lost
Ric Arabia	LDP	Lost
Teddy Lorca	LDP	Lost
Jeane Monteveros	LDP	Lost
Cesar "Sipag" Ochoa	LDP	Lost
Leonito Tapel	LDP	Lost
For Councilor (2nd District)
Moti Arceo	LDP	Won
Emi Calixto-Rubiano	LDP	Won
Danny Francisco	LDP	Lost
Lito Ibay	LDP	Lost
Oca Linao	NPC	Lost
Edith Vergel De Dios	LDP	Won

=== Team Alcera-Roque-Dy ===
Lakas–NUCD–UMDP/Team Alcera-Roque-Dy
Name	Party	Result
For House Of Representative
Connie Dy	Lakas	Won
For Mayor
Greg Alcera	Lakas	Lost
For Vice Mayor
Danny Roque	Lakas	Lost
For Councilor (1st District)
Ed Advincula	Lakas	Won
Bobot Aunor	Lakas	Lost
Jonathan "RJ" Cabrera	Lakas	Won
Marlon Pesebre	Lakas	Won
Bing Petallo	Lakas	Won
Sonny Quial	Lakas	Lost
For Councilor (2nd District)
Rolly Bacar	Lakas	Lost
Linda Hilario	Lakas	Lost
Rey Padua	Lakas	Won
Allan Panaligan	Lakas	Won
Pete Tianzon	Lakas	Lost
Bong Tolentino	Lakas	Won

=== Team Kaibigan ===
PDP–Laban
Name	Party	Result
For House Of Representative
Freddie Webb	PDP–Laban	Lost
For Mayor
Ricardo "Ding" Santos	PDP–Laban	Lost
For Vice Mayor
Jojie Claudio	PDP–Laban	Lost
For Councilor (1st District)
Carding Corral	PDP–Laban	Lost
Oscar De Guia	PDP–Laban	Lost
Nonoy Hilvano	PDP–Laban	Lost
Rey Mateo	PDP–Laban	Won
Jose Antonio Roxas	PDP–Laban	Won
Mon Tesclaros	PDP–Laban	Lost
For Councilor (2nd District)
Jimboy Baliad	PDP–Laban	Lost
Tom Cabrido	PDP–Laban	Lost
Norman Isidro	PDP–Laban	Lost
Zenny Lao	PDP–Laban	Lost
Russo Serrano	PDP–Laban	Lost
Ian Vendivel	PDP–Laban	Lost

== Results ==
Names written in bold-Italic are the re-elected incumbents while in italic are incumbents lost in elections.

=== For Representative ===
Rep. Rolando "Ding" Briones was defeated by Second District Councilor Ma. Consuelo "Connie" Dy.

Pasay House Of Representative Election
Party	Candidate	Votes	%
**Lakas**	**Ma. Consuelo "Connie" Dy**	**52,015**	**45.11**
NPC	Rolando "Ding" Briones	24,663	21.39
PDP–Laban	Freddie Webb	22,134	19.20
Aksyon	Mina Gabor	12,906	11.19
Liberal	Panfilo "Justo" Justo	3,021	2.62
Independent	Allan Carreon	241	0.21
Independent	Pedro Montaño	176	0.15
Independent	Rolly Ladesma	149	0.13
Total votes		**115,305**	**100.00**
Lakas **hold**			

Popular vote percentage
**Dy**	45.11%
Briones	21.39%
Webb	19.20%
Gabor	11.19%
Justo	2.62%
Carreon	0.21%
Montaño	0.15%
Ladesma	0.13%

=== For Mayor ===
Mayor Wenceslao "Peewee" Trinidad won the elections against Ricardo "Ding" Santos and Vice Mayor Gregorio "Greg" Alcera.

Pasay Mayoralty Election
Party	Candidate	Votes	%
**LDP**	**Wenceslao "Peewee" Trinidad**	**60,895**	**46.58**
PDP–Laban	Ricardo "Ding" Santos	35,533	27.18
Lakas	Gregorio "Greg" Alcera	33,736	25.81
Independent	Romulo Marcelo Sr.	558	0.43
Total votes		**130,722**	**100.00**
LDP **hold**			

Popular vote percentage
**Trinidad**	46.58%
Santos	27.18%
Alcera	25.81%
Marcelo	0.43%

=== For Vice Mayor ===
First District Councilor Antonino Calixto was elected.

Pasay Vice Mayoralty Election
Party	Candidate	Votes	%
**LDP**	**Antonino "Tony" Calixto**	**67,000**	**54.38**
Lakas	Danilo "Danny" Roque	34,180	27.74
PDP–Laban	Joven "Jojie" Claudio	22,034	17.88
Total votes		**123,214**	**100.00**
LDP **hold**			

Popular vote percentage
**Calixto**	54.38%
Roque	27.74%
Claudio	17.78%

=== For Councilors ===
==== First District ====
Three of the six incumbents were re-elected. Three-termer councilor Romulo Cabrera was replaced by his son Jonathan "RJ" Cabrera, who placed 5th. Two-termer councilor Antonino "Tony" Calixto ran and won as vice mayor. Three-termer councilor Panfilo "Justo" Justo ran as representative but lost to First District Councilor Ma. Consuelo "Connie" Dy.

Other newly-elected councilors were Ma. Luisa "Bing" Petallo, who placed 2nd and Marlon Pesebre, who placed 6th.

Member, City Council of Pasay's First District
Party	Candidate	Votes	%
**Lakas**	**Eduardo "Ed" Advincula**	**19,808**	
**Lakas**	**Ma. Luisa "Bing" Petallo**	**19,790**	
**PDP–Laban**	**Reynaldo "Rey" Mateo**	**19,486**	
**PDP–Laban**	**Jose Antonio "Lito" Roxas**	**18,801**	
**Lakas**	**Jonathan "RJ" Cabrera**	**15,251**	
**Lakas**	**Marlon Pesebre**	**14,719**	
Independent	Lexter "Lex" Ibay	14,267	
LDP	Uldarico "Ric" Arabia	12,623	
Independent	Jose "Joey" Isidro Jr.	11,813	
PDP–Laban	Mon Montecarlo	10,964	
LDP	Cesar Ochoa	10,816	
LDP	Ferdinand Angel	10,711	
Independent	JV Lim	10,281	
LDP	Leonito Tapel	10,229	
LDP	Jeane Monteveros	9,029	
PDP–Laban	Carding Corral	8,618	
Lakas	Santiago "Sonny" Quial	8,444	
Independent	Sonny Lim	8,148	
LDP	Teodulo "Teddy" Lorca Jr.	8,027	
PDP–Laban	Nonoy Hilvano	7,897	
Independent	Ma. Antonia "Tonya" Cuneta	7,854	
Lakas	Bobot Aunor	8,458	
PDP–Laban	Oscar De Guia	6,671	
Independent	Val Ilagan	6,570	
Independent	Jay Justo	5,149	
Independent	Narciso Foster	2,275	
Independent	Lino Baldemor	866	
Independent	Jojo Roxas	814	
Independent	Lolita Miranda	718	
Independent	Cesar Tibajia	679	
Independent	Romeo Gonzales	634	
Independent	Prince Kahulugan	623	
Independent	JV Ocampo	596	
Independent	Felipe Tauro	592	
Independent	Ben Tejero	585	
Independent	Buddy Quimpo	503	
Independent	Charlie Salic	405	
Total votes			

==== Second District ====
Four of the six incumbents were re-elected. Councilor Ma. Consuelo "Connie" Dy ran as representative and won.

Pedro "Pete" Tiamzon failed to win for re-election, placing 9th.

Newly-elected councilors were Edita "Edith" Vergel de Dios and Arnel Regino "Moti" Arceo, who happened to be both former councilors successfully made a comeback in the city council.

Member, City Council of Pasay's Second District
Party	Candidate	Votes	%
**LDP**	**Imelda "Emi" Calixto-Rubiano**	**33,592**	
**Lakas**	**Allan Panaligan**	**30,448**	
**Lakas**	**Reynaldo "Rey" Padua**	**28,994**	
**Lakas**	**Arvin "Bong" Tolentino**	**25,928**	
**LDP**	**Edita "Edith" Vergel De Dios**	**23,321**	
**LDP**	**Arnel Regino "Moti" Arceo**	**22,042**	
LDP	Emmanuel "Lito" Ibay	21,084	
NPC	Oscar Linao	19,808	
Lakas	Pedro "Pete" Tianzon	19,344	
PDP–Laban	Ian Vendivel	17,846	
Independent	Emilio Bayona	16,331	
Lakas	Erlinda "Linda" Hilario	14,486	
Lakas	Rolando "Rolly" Bacar	10,353	
LDP	Danny Francisco	9,262	
PDP–Laban	Tom Cabrido	8,222	
PDP–Laban	Zeny Lao	8,198	
PDP–Laban	Jimboy Baliad	7,542	
Independent	Phil Ramos	5,643	
PDP–Laban	Russo Serrano	5,087	
PDP–Laban	Norman Isidro	3,273	
Independent	Lamberto Capili	1,638	
Independent	Leo Cadion	1,296	
Independent	Mon Punzalan	625	
Independent	Fred Cornejo	590	
Independent	Victor Antonio	569	
Independent	Manuel Manduriao	161	
Independent	Melchor Menancio	128	
Total votes			
