= 1983 Crispa Redmanizers season =

- Head coach: Tommy Manotoc
- General manager: Danny Floro
- Owners: P. Floro and Sons, Inc.

All Filipino Conference results
- Record: 12–1 (92.3%)
- Place: 1st
- Playoff finish: Champions

Reinforced Conference results
- Record: 18–7 (72%)
- Place: 1st
- Playoff finish: Champions

Open Conference results
- Record: 16–8 (66.7%)
- Place: 1st
- Playoff finish: Champions

Crispa Redmanizers seasons

The 1983 Crispa Redmanizers season was the 9th season of the franchise in the Philippine Basketball Association (PBA).

== Colors ==
Crispa Redmanizers
(dark)
(light)

== Notable achievement ==
The Crispa Redmanizers won their second PBA Grand Slam by winning all three conferences of the season, duplicating their first three-conference sweep back in 1976.

== Summary ==
Three-time winning coach and former U/tex and San Miguel mentor Tommy Manotoc will call the shots for the Crispa Redmanizers beginning the league's 9th season. Crispa lost to Toyota, 84–86 on opening night on March 6. Following the defeat, the defending All-Filipino champions went on to sweep all their remaining games in the eliminations, the one-round semifinals and the best-of-five finals series against Gilbey's Gin to win the All-Filipino crown and finish the conference with a 12-game winning streak.

On May 15 at the start of the Reinforced Filipino Conference. Crispa paraded an import named Billy Ray Bates, known as the "Black Superman". The 6-foot-3 guard from Mississippi, who played four NBA seasons, debut with 64 points in Crispa's 120–119 win over Great Taste, which had last year's Reinforced Conference best import Norman Black. The Redmanizers were unbeaten in the first round of eliminations. On June 19, Bates scored 50 points as Crispa repeated over Great Taste, 113-107 in Cebu City, for their ninth straight victory without a loss as the Redmanizers' winning streak reach to 21 games, dating back to the All-Filipino Conference. Four days later on June 23, the San Miguel Beermen ended Crispa's amazing 21-game winning run with a 110–99 victory.

Crispa finish on top with an 11–3 win-loss slate and an outright semifinals berth along with second placer Great Taste with 10-4 after the double-round eliminations. The Redmanizers took the first finals seat while Great Taste withstood the tough challenge of Gilbey's Gin in their knockout match to earn the right to meet Crispa in the best-of-five championship. After a dismal performances by the Redmanizers in Games One and Three and sandwiched by a squeaker in Game Two, the Coffee Makers are on a threshold of winning their first title in their first finals appearance but the Redmanizers came back strongly to sweep the remaining two games in grand fashion for their second straight PBA crown of the season.

DeWayne Scales, who had a short-lived NBA stint, will be Billy Ray Bates' partner for the Open Conference. The Redmanizers played their first game a week after they clinch the second conference trophy, they lost to Toyota Super Corollas, 93–102 on August 30, which played minus the big three (Fernandez, Jaworski & Arnaiz) but the game was highly anticipated because of the import match-up between Bates and Toyota's returning import Andrew Fields. After playing seven games in the first round of eliminations, Scales was replaced by Larry Demic. Crispa and Great Taste were tied on top of the standings with nine wins and five losses and both teams once again gained automatic berth to the next round. In the four-team, double round-robin semifinals, the Redmanizers scored big victories over Gilbey's, 138-122 on November 20, and San Miguel, 136-114 on November 22, in the second round that puts them a win away from a finals entry along with San Miguel Beermen going into the last scheduled playdate. Gilbey's and Great Taste refuses to call it curtains and prevailed over San Miguel and Crispa respectively as the four semifinalist ended up with identical three wins and three losses.

The first-ever double playoff match for the two teams that will meet in the Open Conference finals took place on November 26, Great Taste takes the first ticket with a 126–118 win over Gilbey's Gin in the first game while Crispa later on arranged a finals rematch with the Coffee Makers by winning over San Miguel Beermen, 130-120 in the nightcap. In the championship series, Crispa completed a 3–0 sweep over Great Taste Coffee Makers. After winning Game One by a five-point margin, 118-113, the Redmanizers won big in the second game to take a commanding 2–0 lead and in the third and final game, the Redmanizers pulled away from a close first three quarters to win by 20 points at the final buzzer, 133-113, as they captured their second PBA Grandslam.

== Won–loss records vs opponents ==
| Team | Win | Loss | 1st (All-Filipino) | 2nd (Reinforced) | 3rd (Open) |
|---|---|---|---|---|---|
| Galerie Dominique | 4 | 1 | 1-0 | 1-1 | 2-0 |
| Gilbey's Gin | 7 | 6 | 5-0 | 1–3 | 1–3 |
| Great Taste | 13 | 5 | 2-0 | 7-2 | 4-3 |
| San Miguel | 6 | 2 | 1-0 | 1-1 | 4-1 |
| Tanduay | 7 | 0 | 1-0 | 4-0 | 2-0 |
| Toyota | 4 | 2 | 1-1 | 2-0 | 1-1 |
| Manhattan/Sunkist/Winston | 5 | 0 | 1-0 | 2-0 | 2-0 |
| Total | 46 | 16 | 12-1 | 18-7 | 16-8 |

== Awards ==
- Abet Guidaben won his first Most Valuable Player (MVP) trophy.
- MVP winner Abet Guidaben, along with Atoy Co and Philip Cezar made it to the Mythical Selection first team.
- Prolific import Billy Ray Bates won the season's Best Import honors in both the Reinforced and Open Conferences.

== Roster ==
Crispa Redmanizers roster
Players
Coaches

| Pos. | No. | Nat. | Name | Ht. | Wt. |
|---|---|---|---|---|---|---|
| F/C | 5 | (Philippines) | Abet Guidaben | 6 ft 5 in (1.96 m) | 180 lb (82 kg) | USJ–R |
| G | 6 | (Philippines) | Fortunato Co, Jr | 6 ft 1 in (1.85 m) | 168 lb (76 kg) | Mapúa |
| G/F | 7 | (Philippines) | Arturo Cristobal | 6 ft 1 in (1.85 m) | 170 lb (77 kg) | Far Eastern |
| G/F | 9 | (Philippines) | Padim Israel | 6 ft 3 in (1.91 m) | 160 lb (73 kg) | Ateneo |
| F | 10 | (Philippines) | Freddie Hubalde | 6 ft 1 in (1.85 m) | 175 lb (79 kg) | Mapúa |
| F/C | 13 | (Philippines) | Elpidio Villamin | 6 ft 2 in (1.88 m) | 188 lb (85 kg) |
| G | 14 | (Philippines) | Tito Varela | 6 ft 1 in (1.85 m) | 165 lb (75 kg) | UE |
| G | 15 | (Philippines) | Bernie Fabiosa | 5 ft 9 in (1.75 m) | 160 lb (73 kg) | UE |
| F | 11 & 16 | (Philippines) | Angelito Esguerra | 6 ft 3 in (1.91 m) | 180 lb (82 kg) | Letran |
| F | 18 | (Philippines) | Philip Cezar | 6 ft 3 in (1.91 m) | 170 lb (77 kg) | José Rizal |
| G | 24 | (Philippines) | Ramon Cruz | 5 ft 11 in (1.80 m) | 155 lb (70 kg) | UE |
| G/F | 2 | (United States) | Billy Ray Bates (I) | 6 ft 3 in (1.91 m) | 212 lb (96 kg) | Kentucky State |
| C | 31 & 35 | (United States) | DeWayne Scales (I) | 6 ft 8 in (2.03 m) | 208 lb (94 kg) | LSU |
| C | 23 & 25 | (United States) | Larry Demic (I) | 6 ft 9 in (2.06 m) | 220 lb (100 kg) | Arizona |

Head coach

- (Philippines) Tommy Manotoc

Assistant coach(es)

- (Philippines) Narciso Bernardo

Legend

- (C) Team captain
- (I) Import
- Injured

_{Team Manager: Danny Floro}

=== Subtraction ===
| Player | Number | Position | Height | New Team |
|---|---|---|---|---|
| Romulo Mamaril | 17 | Center | 6 ft 6 in (1.98 m) | Sunkist |
