= Larry Demic =

American basketball player

Personal information
- Born: June 27, 1957 (age 69) Gary, Indiana, U.S.
- Listed height: 6 ft 9 in (2.06 m)
- Listed weight: 225 lb (102 kg)

Career information
- High school: Westside (Gary, Indiana)
- College: Arizona (1975–1979)
- NBA draft: 1979: 1st round, 9th overall pick
- Drafted by: New York Knicks
- Position: Power forward
- Number: 42

Career history
- 1979–1982: New York Knicks
- 1983: Crispa Redmanizers
- 1983–1984: Detroit Spirits
- 1984–1985: Puerto Rico Coquis

Career highlights
- First-team All-Pac-10 (1979)
- Stats at NBA.com
- Stats at Basketball Reference

Lawrence Curtis Demic (born June 27, 1957) is an American former professional basketball player for the New York Knicks in the National Basketball Association (NBA). He played three seasons with the Knicks from 1979 through 1982. Demic played college basketball for the Arizona Wildcats, where he was an All-Pac-10 first team selection in 1979. He was drafted in the 1979 NBA draft in the first round with the ninth overall pick by New York.

In 1983, he played for the Crispa Redmanizers in the Open Conference of the Philippine Basketball Association, teaming up with Billy Ray Bates to win the championship and the Grand Slam for the Redmanizers.

== Career statistics ==
Legend
GP	Games played	GS	Games started	MPG	Minutes per game
FG%	Field goal percentage	3P%	3-point field goal percentage	FT%	Free throw percentage
RPG	Rebounds per game	APG	Assists per game	SPG	Steals per game
BPG	Blocks per game	PPG	Points per game	**Bold**	Career high

=== NBA ===
==== Regular season ====
Year	Team	GP	GS	MPG	FG%	3P%	FT%	RPG	APG	SPG	BPG	PPG
1979–80	New York	**82**		**22.8**	.436	–	.601	**5.9**	**.8**	**.7**	**.4**	**7.0**
1980–81	New York	76		12.7	**.504**	.000	**.630**	3.2	.4	.2	.2	4.1
1981–82	New York	48	0	7.4	.470	.0	.359	1.6	.3	.1	.1	1.9
Career		206	0	15.5	.459	.000	.580	3.9	.5	.3	.2	4.7

==== Playoffs ====
Year	Team	GP	MPG	FG%	3P%	FT%	RPG	APG	SPG	BPG	PPG
1981	New York	2	18.5	.800	–	.500	3.5	.0	.0	.5	4.5
