= 1983 PBA season =

Ninth PBA season

- Duration: March 6 – December 1, 1983
- Teams: 8
- TV partner: Vintage Sports (City2)
- Season MVP: Abet Guidaben (Crispa Redmanizers)
- All-Filipino Conference champions: Crispa Redmanizers
- All-Filipino Conference runners-up: Gilbey's Gin Gimlets
- Reinforced Filipino Conference champions: Crispa Redmanizers
- Reinforced Filipino Conference runners-up: Great Taste Coffee Makers
- Open Conference champions: Crispa Redmanizers
- Open Conference runners-up: Great Taste Coffee Makers

Seasons
- ← 1982 1984 →

The 1983 PBA season was the 9th season of the Philippine Basketball Association (PBA).

== Board of governors ==
=== Executive committee ===
- Mariano A. Yenko, Jr. (Commissioner)
- Carlos Palanca III (President, representing Gilbey's Gin)
- Jose Ibazeta, Jr. (Vice-President, representing San Miguel Beermen)
- Anna Dominique Coseteng (Treasurer, representing Galerie Dominique)

=== Teams ===
Team	Company	Governor
Crispa Redmanizers	P. Floro and Sons	Tomas L. Manotoc
Galerie Dominique Artists	Galerie Dominique	Anna Dominique Coseteng
Gilbey's Gin Tonics	La Tondeña Incorporada	Carlos Palanca III
Great Taste Discoverers	Consolidated Foods Corporation	Quirino Marquinez
Manhattan Shirtmakers	Sanyu Group of Companies	Pablito L. Bermudo
San Miguel Beermen	San Miguel Corporation	Nazario Avendaño
Toyota Silver Coronas	Delta Motor Corporation	Joaquin Rodriguez
YCO-Tanduay	Elizalde & Company; Tanduay Distillers, Inc.	Johnny Jose

== Season highlights ==
- The Crispa Redmanizers completed a three-conference sweep and won their second Grandslam after first doing the trick back in 1976, this time under new coach Tommy Manotoc.
- On May 15, the PBA fans witnessed the "Black Superman" Billy Ray Bates played his first game for Crispa Redmanizers. Bates won the best import award in both Reinforced and Open Conferences, leading the Redmanizers to two championships and a grandslam.
- A rising powerhouse Great Taste Coffee with the entry of Fil-Am rookie Ricardo Brown, three-time MVP Bogs Adornado and import Norman Black in their lineup, led the Coffee Makers to their first-ever finals appearances after eight years.
- The Toyota Super Corollas played their final season in the PBA after nine years of participation, the multi-titled ballclub announced its disbandment prior to the start of the 1984 PBA season.

== Opening ceremonies ==
The muses for the participating teams are as follows:

Team	Muse
Crispa Redmanizers	Aurora Sevilla
Galerie Dominique	Kristine Garcia and Irma Alegre
Gilbey's Gin	Maricel Soriano
Great Taste Discoverers	Carines Zaragoza
Manhattan Shirtmakers	Ampot Arrieta
San Miguel Beermen	Geraldine Lopez and Pops Fernandez
Toyota Silver Coronas	Ella Lopez
YCO-Tanduay	Lani Mercado

== Champions ==
- All Filipino Conference: Crispa Redmanizers
- Reinforced Conference: Crispa Redmanizers
- Open Conference: Crispa Redmanizers
- Team with best win–loss percentage: Crispa Redmanizers (46-16, .742)
- Best Team of the Year: Crispa Redmanizers (5th & Final)

== All-Filipino Conference ==
=== Elimination round ===
Pos	Team	W	L	PCT	GB	Qualification
1	Crispa Redmanizers	6	1	.857	—	Semifinal round
2	Great Taste Discoverers	5	2	.714	1	Semifinal round
3	Gilbey's Gin Gimlets	4	3	.571	2	Semifinal round
4	Toyota Silver Coronas	4	3	.571	2	Semifinal round
5	YCO-Tanduay	3	4	.429	3	
6	San Miguel Beermen	3	4	.429	3	
7	Manhattan Shirtmakers	2	5	.286	4	
8	Galerie Dominique Artists	1	6	.143	5	

=== Semifinal round ===
Pos	Team	W	L	PCT	GB	Qualification
1	Crispa Redmanizers	3	0	1.000	—	Advance to the Finals
2	Gilbey's Gin Gimlets	2	1	.667	1	Advance to the Finals
3	Great Taste Discoverers	1	2	.333	2	Proceed to third place playoff
4	Toyota Silver Coronas	0	3	.000	3	Proceed to third place playoff

=== Third-place playoffs ===
Team 1	Series	Team 2	Game 1	Game 2	Game 3	Game 4	Game 5
(3) Great Taste Discoverers	2–1 (Note: The PBA Finals ended earlier than the third place playoffs. Rather than continue the series, the team that won more games was named third place.)	(4) Toyota Silver Coronas	139–128	126–136	131–126	—	—

=== Finals ===
Team 1	Series	Team 2	Game 1	Game 2	Game 3	Game 4	Game 5
(1) Crispa Redmanizers	3–0	(2) Gilbey's Gin	121–101	119–116	115–84	—	—

== Reinforced Filipino Conference ==
=== Elimination round ===
Pos	Team	W	L	PCT	GB	Qualification
1	Crispa Redmanizers	11	3	.786	—	Advance to semifinal round
2	Great Taste Discoverers	10	4	.714	1	Advance to semifinal round
3	Tanduay Rhum Makers	7	7	.500	4	Proceed to quarterfinal round
4	Toyota Silver Coronas	7	7	.500	4	Proceed to quarterfinal round
5	Gilbey's Gin Gimlets	7	7	.500	4	Proceed to quarterfinal round
6	San Miguel Beermen	6	8	.429 (Note: Quarterfinal round berth playoff: San Miguel 119–103 Sunkist)	5	Proceed to quarterfinal round
7	Sunkist Orange Lovers	6	8	.429	5	
8	Galerie Dominique Artists	2	12	.143	9	

=== Quarterfinal round ===
Pos	Team	W	L	PCT	GB	Qualification
3	Gilbey's Gin Gimlets	3	0	1.000	—	Semifinal round
4	Tanduay Rhum Makers	2	1	.667	1	Semifinal round
5	San Miguel Beermen	1	2	.333	2	
6	Toyota Silver Coronas	0	3	.000	3	

=== Semifinal round ===
Pos	Team	W	L	PCT	GB	Qualification
1	Crispa Redmanizers	4	2	.667 (Note: Head-to-head quotient: Crispa 1.018, Great Taste 1.006, Gilbey's 0.974; second-seed playoff: Great Taste 129–123 Gilbey's)	—	Advance to the Finals
2	Great Taste Discoverers	4	2	.667	—	Advance to the Finals
3	Gilbey's Gin Gimlets	4	2	.667	—	Proceed to third-place playoff
4	Tanduay Rhum Makers	0	6	.000	4	Proceed to third-place playoff

=== Third place playoffs ===
Team 1	Series	Team 2	Game 1	Game 2	Game 3	Game 4	Game 5
(3) Gilbey's Gin Gimlets	1–3	(4) Tanduay Rhum Makers	134–131	118–136	127–132	121–135	—

=== Finals ===
Team 1	Series	Team 2	Game 1	Game 2	Game 3	Game 4	Game 5
(1) Crispa Redmanizers	3–2	(2) Great Taste Coffee Makers	128–135	105–102	123–128	142–113	139–120

- Best Import of the Conference: Billy Ray Bates (Crispa)

== Open Conference ==
=== Elimination round ===
Pos	Team	W	L	PCT	GB	Qualification
1	Great Taste Coffee Makers	9	5	.643	—	Advance to semifinal round
2	Crispa Redmanizers	9	5	.643	—	Advance to semifinal round
3	San Miguel Beermen	7	7	.500	2	Proceed to quarterfinal round
4	Galerie Dominique Artists	7	7	.500	2	Proceed to quarterfinal round
5	Gilbey's Gin Gimlets	7	7	.500	2	Proceed to quarterfinal round
6	Tanduay Rhum Makers	6	8	.429 (Note: Quarterfinal round berth playoff: Tanduay 111–110 Toyota)	3	Proceed to quarterfinal round
7	Toyota Super Corollas	6	8	.429	3	
8	Winston Kings	5	9	.357	4	

=== Quarterfinal round ===
Pos	Team	W	L	PCT	GB	Qualification
1	Gilbey's Gin Gimlets	2	1	.667 (Note: Head-to-head quotient: Gilbey's 1.095, San Miguel 0.981, Tanduay 0.927; semifinal round berth playoff: San Miguel 108–104 Tanduay)	—	Semifinal round
2	San Miguel Beermen	2	1	.667	—	Semifinal round
3	Tanduay Rhum Makers	2	1	.667	—	
4	Galerie Dominique Artists	0	3	.000	2	

=== Semifinal round ===
Pos	Team	W	L	PCT	GB	Qualification
1	Crispa Redmanizers	3	3	.500 (Note: Head-to-head quotient: Crispa 1.033, Gilbey's 1.003, Great Taste 1.000, San Miguel 0.966; first-seed playoff: Crispa 130–120 San Miguel; second-seed playoff: Great Taste 126–118 Gilbey's)	—	Advance to the Finals
2	Great Taste Coffee Makers	3	3	.500	—	Advance to the Finals
3	Gilbey's Gin Gimlets	3	3	.500	—	Proceed to third-place playoff
4	San Miguel Beermen	3	3	.500	—	Proceed to third-place playoff

=== Third-place playoffs ===
Team 1	Series	Team 2	Game 1	Game 2	Game 3	Game 4	Game 5
(3) Tanduay Rhum Makers	2–1 (Note: The PBA Finals ended earlier than the third place playoffs. Rather than continue the series, the team that won more games in the series was named third place.)	(4) Northern Cement	121–135	95–127	148–110	—	—

=== Finals ===
Team 1	Series	Team 2	Game 1	Game 2	Game 3	Game 4	Game 5
(1) Crispa Redmanizers	3–0	(2) Great Taste Coffee Makers	118–113	149–132	133–113	—	—

- Best Import of the Conference: Billy Ray Bates (Crispa)

== Awards ==
- Most Valuable Player: Abet Guidaben (Crispa)
- Rookie of the Year: Ricardo Brown (Great Taste)
- Best Import-Reinforced/Open Conference: Billy Ray Bates (Crispa)
- Most Improved Player: Terry Saldaña (Gilbey's Gin)
- Mythical Five:
  - Ricardo Brown (Great Taste)
  - Atoy Co (Crispa)
  - Abet Guidaben (Crispa)
  - Bogs Adornado (Great Taste)
  - Philip Cezar (Crispa)

== Cumulative standings ==
Team	GP	W	L	PCT
Crispa Redmanizers	62	46	16	.741
Great Taste Coffee Makers	63	38	25	.603
Gilbey's Gin Tonics	68	34	34	.500
San Miguel Beermen	53	26	27	.491
Tanduay Rhum Makers	53	24	29	.453
Toyota Silver Coronas / Super Corollas	45	18	27	.400
Manhattan / Sunkist / Winston	36	13	23	.361
Galerie Dominique Artists	38	10	28	.263
