= 1983 San Miguel Beermen season =

- Head coach: Nat Canson
- Owner: San Miguel Corporation

All Filipino Conference results
- Record: 3–4 (42.9%)
- Place: 6th
- Playoff finish: N/A

Reinforced Conference results
- Record: 8–10 (44.4%)
- Place: 5th
- Playoff finish: Quarterfinals

Open Conference results
- Record: 15–13 (53.6%)
- Place: 3rd
- Playoff finish: Semifinals

San Miguel Beermen seasons

The 1983 San Miguel Beermen season was the 9th season of the franchise in the Philippine Basketball Association (PBA).

== Transactions ==
Players Added	Signed	Former team
Matthew Gaston	Off-season	U-Tex (disbanded)
Carlson Samlani	Off-season	U-Tex (disbanded)
Federico Lauchengco ^{Rookie}	Off-season	N/A

== Summary ==
The San Miguel Beermen, two-time finalist last season, will now have former national team coach Nat Canson on the bench as he took over the coaching chores from Tommy Manotoc, who moved over to Crispa Redmanizers. The Beermen missed out a berth in the semifinal round in the first two conferences.

In the Open Conference, their import Donnie Ray Koonce teamed up with another returnee Rich Adams, formerly of N-Rich last season. The Beermen had seven wins and seven losses after the double round eliminations and they made it this time as the last team to complete the semifinal cast following a 108–104 victory over Tanduay Rhum Makers in a knockout game on November 10. San Miguel were tied with three other teams; Crispa, Great Taste and Gilbey's, after the double round semifinals with three wins and three losses each. The Beermen lost to Grandslam-seeking Crispa Redmanizers, 120–130, in a playoff for a finals berth on November 26. They placed third with a 2–1 series win against Gilbey's Gin.

== Notable dates ==
June 23: San Miguel defeated Crispa Redmanizers, 110-99, to finally ended Crispa's amazing 21-game winning streak that dates back to the previous conference and handed the Redmanizers' first loss in the conference after nine straight wins.

July 21: Donnie Ray Koonce scored 57 points to lead San Miguel to a come-from-behind 135–132 win over his former team Toyota, thereby eliminating the Silver Coronas.

== Won-loss records vs Opponents ==
Team	Win	Loss	1st (All-Filipino)	2nd (Reinforced)	3rd (Open)
Crispa	2	6	0–1	1-1	1–4
Galerie Dominique	5	1	1-0	2-0	2-1
Gilbey’s Gin	6	6	1-0	1–2	4-4
Great Taste	3	4	0–1	0–2	3-1
Tanduay	3	5	0–1	1–2	2-2
Toyota	4	2	1-0	2-1	1-1
Manhattan/Sunkist/Winston	3	3	0–1	1–2	2-0
Total	26	27	3–4	8–10	15-13

== Roster ==
1983 San Miguel Beermen roster
Players

Pos.	#	POB	Name	Height	Weight	DOB (YYYY–MM–DD)	From
G	1	(Philippines)	Lim Eng Beng	5 ft 11 in (1.80 m)	175 lb (79 kg)		De La Salle
F/C	5	(Philippines)	Jesus Migalbin	6 ft 3 in (1.91 m)	170 lb (77 kg)		San Agustin
G/F	6	(Philippines)	Biboy Ravanes	6 ft 1 in (1.85 m)	165 lb (75 kg)		Cebu
G	7	(Philippines)	Marte Saldaña	5 ft 11 in (1.80 m)	145 lb (66 kg)		Far Eastern
F	8	(Philippines)	Renato Lobo	6 ft 2 in (1.88 m)	178 lb (81 kg)		Far Eastern
F	99 & 9	(Philippines)	Anthony Dasalla	6 ft 3 in (1.91 m)	170 lb (77 kg)		Far Eastern
C	10	(Philippines)	Carlson Samlani	6 ft 4 in (1.93 m)	185 lb (84 kg)		San Sebastian
F	13	(Philippines)	Manny Paner	6 ft 2 in (1.88 m)	195 lb (88 kg)		Visayas
F/C	15	(Philippines)	Rodolfo Lalota	6 ft 3 in (1.91 m)	160 lb (73 kg)		Mapúa
F/C	17	(Philippines)	Kenneth Yap	6 ft 2 in (1.88 m)	150 lb (68 kg)		De La Salle
G	20	(Philippines)	Matthew Gaston	6 ft 1 in (1.85 m)	175 lb (79 kg)		Ateneo
G	77	(Philippines)	Federico Lauchengco	6 ft 0 in (1.83 m)	153 lb (69 kg)		Far Eastern
G/F	30	(United States)	Donnie Ray Koonce (I)	6 ft 3 in (1.91 m)	190 lb (86 kg)		North Carolina
C	40	(United States)	Rich Adams (I)	6 ft 9 in (2.06 m)	200 lb (91 kg)		Illinois

Coaches

Head coach

- (Philippines) Nat Canson

Assistant coach(es)

- (Philippines) Freddie Gonzales

Legend

- (C) Team captain
- (I) Import
- Injured

_{Team Manager: Jose Ibazeta, Jr.}
