= 1983 Great Taste Coffee Makers season =

- Head coach: Jimmy Mariano; Baby Dalupan
- Owner: CFC Corporation

All Filipino Conference results
- Record: 8–5 (61.5%)
- Place: 3rd
- Playoff finish: Semifinals

Reinforced Conference results
- Record: 17–9 (65.4%)
- Place: 2nd
- Playoff finish: Finals (lost to Crispa)

Open Conference results
- Record: 13–11 (54.2%)
- Place: 2nd
- Playoff finish: Finals (lost to Crispa)

Great Taste Coffee Makers seasons

The 1983 Great Taste Coffee Makers season was the 9th season of the franchise in the Philippine Basketball Association (PBA).

== Transactions ==
Players Added	Signed	Former team
Ricardo Brown ^{Rookie, the first Fil-American to play in the PBA}	Off-season	N/A
Bogs Adornado	Off-season	U-Tex (disbanded)
Alejo Alolor	Off-season	Galerie Dominique
Bernardo Carpio	Off-season	Crispa

== Summary ==
Three-time MVP Bogs Adornado and the former Houston Rockets draftee and naturalized Filipino Ricardo Brown was signed by Great Taste (formerly N-Rich) in a pair of player deals. In their maiden appearance in the All-Filipino Conference, Adornado and Brown combined for identical outputs of 22 points each in helping Great Taste escape with a 93–92 opening day win over San Miguel Beer. The Discoverers finished second behind Crispa in the one-round eliminations. They were denied of a finals berth by Gilbey's and Crispa in the round-robin semifinals among four teams.

Last year's awardee Norman Black of San Miguel Beermen has moved to Great Taste in the second offing of the season. Black's entry and playing alongside Adornado and Brown has finally shed the Coffee Makers' image as a second division club and it has been a long time coming for Great Taste in their first entry to the finals after eight seasons. They beat Gilbey's Gin in the playoff for the right to faced Crispa Redmanizers in the Reinforced Filipino championship.

Going up against Crispa's prolific import Billy Ray Bates, the Coffee Makers led the best-of-five title series, two games to one and a win away from their first-ever PBA crown. The Redmanizers, however, battled back to win the last two games by big margins and take home their second championship of the season.

Norman Black teamed up with Charles Thompson in Great Taste' first two games in the Open Conference. Thompson had problems fitting into Great Taste' play patterns and was replaced by Dawan Scott. Great Taste makes it to the semifinals outright along with Crispa just like in the previous conference. In the semifinal round, the Coffee Makers were in danger of being booted out from the finals race going into their last two assignments, Great Taste had to beat Gilbey's and Crispa by a margin of three points to forge a four-way deadlock and two knockout games to determined the finalist.

On November 26, Great Taste defeated Gilbey's Gin and Crispa prevailed over San Miguel Beer in the second game to set-up a finals rematch for the Open Conference crown. The Crispa Redmanizers surprisingly had an easier time winning over the Coffee Makers this time, scoring a 3–0 sweep to win their second PBA Grandslam.

== Occurrences ==
During the Open Conference, the Coffee Makers were on top of the standings when in their game against Galerie Dominique in the second round of eliminations, coach Jimmy Mariano was quoted as saying "We didn't intend to win", which was carried out by the media as an admission of deliberately losing the game. Mariano was subsequently sacked from his job, and former Crispa coach Baby Dalupan, who was hired as team consultant during the second conference, took over to replace Mariano beginning the semifinal round.

== Won-loss records vs opponents ==
Team	Win	Loss	1st (All-Filipino)	2nd (Reinforced)	3rd (Open)
Crispa	5	13	0–2	2–7	3–4
Galerie Dominique	4	1	1-0	2-0	1-1
Gilbey's Gin	10	2	1-1	5-0	4–1
San Miguel	4	3	1-0	2-0	1–3
Tanduay	6	1	1-0	3-1	2–0
Toyota	5	4	3-2	1-1	1-1
Manhattan/Sunkist/Winston	4	1	1-0	2-0	1-1
Total	38	25	8-5	17-9	13-11

== Awards ==
- Ricardo Brown was named the season's Rookie of the Year (ROY).
- William "Bogs" Adornado and Ricardo Brown made it to the Mythical Five selection.
- Great Taste import Norman Black became the league's first recipient of the Award "Mr.100%".

== Roster ==
Great Taste Coffee roster
Players
Coaches

Pos.	No.	Nat.	Name	Ht.	Wt.
F/C	1	(Philippines)	Manny Victorino	6 ft 5 in (1.96 m)	200 lb (91 kg)	José Rizal
G/F	2	(Philippines)	Alejo Alolor	6 ft 1 in (1.85 m)	160 lb (73 kg)	Visayas
G/F	3	(Philippines)	Jaime Manansala	5 ft 11 in (1.80 m)	160 lb (73 kg)	UE
F/C	6	(Philippines)	Joel Banal	6 ft 4 in (1.93 m)	163 lb (74 kg)	Mapúa
G	8	(Philippines)	Noel Guzman	5 ft 10 in (1.78 m)	165 lb (75 kg)	San Beda
G	10	(Philippines)	Eduardo Mendoza	6 ft 0 in (1.83 m)	165 lb (75 kg)	Visayas
C	11	(Philippines)	Florendo Ritualo	6 ft 3 in (1.91 m)	190 lb (86 kg)	Baguio
G	16	(Philippines)	Leonardo Paguntalan	6 ft 1 in (1.85 m)	182 lb (83 kg)	Western Institute
F	22	(Philippines)	Filomeno Gulfin	6 ft 2 in (1.88 m)	170 lb (77 kg)	Southwestern-U
G	23	(United States)	Ricardo Brown	6 ft 0 in (1.83 m)	175 lb (79 kg)	Pepperdine
F	29	(Philippines)	Bernardo Carpio	6 ft 3 in (1.91 m)	188 lb (85 kg)	Ateneo
G/F	33	(Philippines)	Bogs Adornado	6 ft 1 in (1.85 m)	175 lb (79 kg)	UST
F	66	(Philippines)	Joey Marquez	6 ft 2 in (1.88 m)	175 lb (79 kg)	Angeles
F	24	(United States)	Norman Black (I)	6 ft 5 in (1.96 m)	190 lb (86 kg)	Saint Joseph's
F	18	(United States)	Charles Thompson (I)	6 ft 7 in (2.01 m)	235 lb (107 kg)
C	7	(United States)	Dawan Scott (I)	6 ft 9 in (2.06 m)	230 lb (104 kg)	Seton Hall

Head coach

- (Philippines) Jimmy Mariano
- (Philippines) Baby Dalupan

Assistant coach(es)

- (Philippines) Nap Flores (Trainer)

Legend

- (C) Team captain
- (I) Import
- Injured

_{Team Manager: Ignacio Gotao}

=== Additions ===
Player	Signed	Former team
Jaime Manansala	May 1983	YCO-Tanduay
