= 1983 Tanduay Rhum Makers season =

- Head coach: Freddie Webb

All Filipino Conference results
- Record: 3–4 (42.9%)
- Place: 5th
- Playoff finish: N/A

Reinforced Conference results
- Record: 12–15 (44.4%)
- Place: 3rd
- Playoff finish: Semifinals

Open Conference results
- Record: 9–10 (47.4%)
- Place: 5th
- Playoff finish: Quarterfinals

Tanduay Rhum Makers seasons

The 1983 Tanduay Rhum Makers season was the 9th season of the franchise in the Philippine Basketball Association (PBA). Known as Yco-Tanduay in the All-Filipino Conference.

== Summary ==
The Esquires missed out a berth in the round of four in the All-Filipino Conference, finishing just a game behind semifinalist Gilbey's Gin and Toyota.

Renamed as Tanduay Rhum Makers in the Reinforced Filipino Conference. The team signed up Francois Wise, formerly of disbanded U-Tex Wranglers, as their import. The Rhum Makers were the last team to enter the semifinal round after defeating San Miguel Beermen, 118-107. They lost all their six matches in the semifinals and placed third with a 3-1 series win over Gilbey's Gin in their battle for third place.

Francois Wise was Tanduay's lone import in their opening day overtime win over Gilbey's Gin at the start of the Open Conference on August 28 when their other import Reggie Gaines was sent home by coach Freddie Webb for reneging on an earlier agreement, asking for astronomical terms which were not part of the bargain when he agreed to come over. Gaines' replacement was another Philadelphia 76ers draftee George Melton. Tanduay had to win their last game in the eliminations against Toyota, 131-119 on October 27, to force a playoff with the Super Corollas for the last quarterfinals berth. Both teams finish with six wins and eight losses.

In the knockout game three nights later on October 30, the Rhum Makers rallied in the final minute to score a dramatic, come-from-behind 111-110 victory over Toyota, behind the plays of Mike Bilbao and Abet Gutierrez. The escape win eliminates the defending Open Conference champions Super Corollas for the second straight time in the season. In the quarterfinal round, the Rhum Makers were tied with Gilbey's and San Miguel with two wins and one loss and they figured in another playoff, this time for the fourth and last ticket to the semifinals against the Beermen. Tanduay lost to San Miguel, 104-108.

== Scoring record ==
July 10: Import Francois Wise scored his personal-best of 74 points in Tanduay's 145-118 win over Great Taste.

== Won-loss records vs Opponents ==
Team	Win	Loss	1st (All-Filipino)	2nd (Reinforced)	3rd (Open)
Crispa	0	7	0-1	0-4	0-2
Galerie Dominique	4	2	1-0	1-1	2-1
Gilbey’s Gin	5	8	0-1	4-5	1-2
Great Taste	1	6	0-1	1-3	0-2
San Miguel	5	3	1-0	2-1	2-2
Toyota	6	1	1-0	2-1	3-0
Manhattan/Sunkist/Winston	3	2	0-1	2-0	1-1
Total	24	29	3-4	12-15	9-10

== Roster ==
Tanduay Rhum Makers roster
Players
Coaches

Pos.	No.	Nat.	Name	Ht.	Wt.
G	4	(Philippines)	Frankie Lim	5 ft 11 in (1.80 m)	154 lb (70 kg)	San Beda
G	5	(Philippines)	Melvin Martin	6 ft 0 in (1.83 m)	150 lb (68 kg)	Adamson
G	7	(Philippines)	Roberto Dela Rosa	5 ft 11 in (1.80 m)	154 lb (70 kg)	Far Eastern
G	44 & 8	(Philippines)	Alexander Marquez	5 ft 9 in (1.75 m)	160 lb (73 kg)	De La Salle
F	10	(Philippines)	Zaldy Latoza	6 ft 2 in (1.88 m)	150 lb (68 kg)	TUA
F	12	(Philippines)	Reynaldo Lazaro	6 ft 1 in (1.85 m)	179 lb (81 kg)	Far Eastern
F	13	(Philippines)	Alberto Gutierrez	6 ft 2 in (1.88 m)	150 lb (68 kg)	Ateneo de Davao
C	15	(Philippines)	Ely Capacio	6 ft 4 in (1.93 m)	180 lb (82 kg)
G	17	(Philippines)	Raymundo Barreiro	5 ft 11 in (1.80 m)	180 lb (82 kg)	San Beda
G	20	(Philippines)	Miguel Bilbao	5 ft 9 in (1.75 m)	150 lb (68 kg)	De La Salle
F/C	24	(Philippines)	Jose Yango	6 ft 3 in (1.91 m)	165 lb (75 kg)	San Beda
F	14 & 30	(Philippines)	Victor Sanchez	6 ft 3 in (1.91 m)	180 lb (82 kg)	Mapúa
G/F	3	(United States)	Francois Wise (I)	6 ft 4 in (1.93 m)	222 lb (101 kg)	Long Beach State
C	33	(United States)	George Melton (I)	6 ft 9 in (2.06 m)	222 lb (101 kg)	Cheyney

Head coach

- (Philippines) Freddie Webb

Assistant coach(es)

- (Philippines) Loreto Carbonell

Legend

- (C) Team captain
- (I) Import
- Injured

_{Team Manager: Johnny Jose / Jesus Bilbao}

=== Subtraction ===
Player	Number	Position	Height	New Team
Jaime Manansala	11	Guard-Forward	5 ft 11 in (1.80 m)	Great Taste
