= 1983 Gilbey's Gin Tonics season =

- Head coach: Arturo Valenzona
- Owner: La Tondeña Incorporada

All Filipino Conference results
- Record: 6–7 (46.2%)
- Place: 2nd
- Playoff finish: Finals (lost to Crispa)

Reinforced Filipino Conference results
- Record: 15–13 (53.6%)
- Place: 4th
- Playoff finish: Semifinals

Open Conference results
- Record: 13–14 (48.1%)
- Place: 4th
- Playoff finish: Semifinals

Gilbey's Gin Tonics seasons

The 1983 Gilbey's Gin Tonics season was the 5th season of the franchise in the Philippine Basketball Association (PBA). Known as Gilbey's Gin in the All-Filipino Conference and Gilbey's Gin Gimlets in the Reinforced Filipino Conference.

== Transactions ==
Players Added	Signed	Former team
Terry Saldaña	Off-season	Toyota
Gary Vargas	Off-season	U-Tex (disbanded)
Steve Watson	Off-season	U-Tex (disbanded)
Dennis Roldan ^{Rookie}	Off-season	N/A

== Summary ==
Gilbey's Gin landed in the finals of the revived All-Filipino Conference, after a two-year absence of the league's most prestigious tournament, the Gins lost to powerhouse Crispa Redmanizers via three-game sweep in the best-of-five title series.

The high-scoring Lew Massey return as their import with Gilbey's now sported a new monicker "Gimlets" in the Reinforced Filipino Conference. Gilbey's split their 14 games in the eliminations with seven wins and seven loss each and won all three of their quarterfinal matches. In the semifinal round, the Gimlets create a triple tie with Crispa and Great Taste for the two finals berth. The Redmanizers enters the finals first with a higher quotient while Gilbey's lost to Great Taste in a playoff match.

Gilbey's will have another monicker as the Gin Tonics in the Open Conference and two new imports suited up, Anthony Roberts, a first-round draft pick by Denver who played the entire 82-game schedule of the NBA as a rookie in the 1977–1978 season, and Jack Dorsey, a second-round pick by New Orleans Jazz in the 1976 NBA draft and who had brief stints with three NBA teams. Three games into the Open Conference, "Sweet Lew" Massey was reinstated to replace Anthony Roberts after Gilbey's dropped their first two outings. Massey teamed up with Jacky Dorsey as Gilbey's again figured in a finals playoff berth with all four semifinalist tied with three wins and three losses. The Gin Tonics fell short of advancing in the championship round and were denied by Great Taste Coffee Makers for the second time in the season.

== Won-loss records vs Opponents ==
Team	Win	Loss	1st (All-Filipino)	2nd (Reinforced Filipino)	3rd (Open)
Crispa	6	7	0–5	3-1	3–1
Galerie Dominique	5	1	1-0	2-0	2–1
Great Taste	2	10	1-1	0–5	1–4
San Miguel	6	6	0–1	2-1	4-4
Tanduay	8	5	1-0	5-4	2–1
Toyota	5	2	2-0	2-1	1-1
Manhattan/Sunkist/Winston	2	3	1-0	1-1	0–2
Total	34	34	6–7	15-13	13–14

== Roster ==
1983 Gilbey's Gin Tonics roster
Players

Pos.	#	POB	Name	Height	Weight	DOB (YYYY–MM–DD)	From
G/F	6	(Philippines)	Conrado Pasco	6 ft 2 in (1.88 m)	180 lb (82 kg)		Far Eastern
F	7	(Philippines)	Steve Watson	6 ft 2 in (1.88 m)	190 lb (86 kg)		Ateneo
F	8	(Philippines)	Marlowe Jacutin	6 ft 0 in (1.83 m)	160 lb (73 kg)		Visayas
F/C	10	(Philippines)	Eduardo Ducut	6 ft 5 in (1.96 m)	185 lb (84 kg)		Letran
F	11	(Philippines)	Gary Vargas	6 ft 2 in (1.88 m)	162 lb (73 kg)		PSBA
G	12	(Philippines)	Dennis Roldan	6 ft 0 in (1.83 m)	175 lb (79 kg)		Trinity
F/C	13	(Philippines)	Antero Saldaña	6 ft 3 in (1.91 m)	185 lb (84 kg)		UST
G/F	15	(Philippines)	Alex Clariño	6 ft 2 in (1.88 m)	190 lb (86 kg)		Lyceum
G	17	(Philippines)	Joseph Herrera	6 ft 0 in (1.83 m)	160 lb (73 kg)		Letran
F/C	18	(Philippines)	Eusebio Del Rosario	6 ft 2 in (1.88 m)	185 lb (84 kg)		UE
F	20	(Philippines)	Rolando Buhay	6 ft 3 in (1.91 m)	147 lb (67 kg)		NCBA
G	24	(Philippines)	Wilfredo Generalao	5 ft 8 in (1.73 m)	150 lb (68 kg)		Visayas
G/F	23	(United States)	Lew Massey (I)	6 ft 5 in (1.96 m)	215 lb (98 kg)		North Carolina
F	0	(United States)	Anthony Roberts (I)	6 ft 5 in (1.96 m)	185 lb (84 kg)		Oral Roberts
C	1	(United States)	Jacky Dorsey (I)	6 ft 6 in (1.98 m)	230 lb (104 kg)		Georgia

Coaches

Head coach

- (Philippines) Arturo Valenzona

Assistant coach(es)

- (Philippines) Guillermo Afable

Legend

- (C) Team captain
- (I) Import
- Injured

_{Team Manager: Adolf Ferrer}
