= Billy Ray Bates =

American basketball player (born 1956)

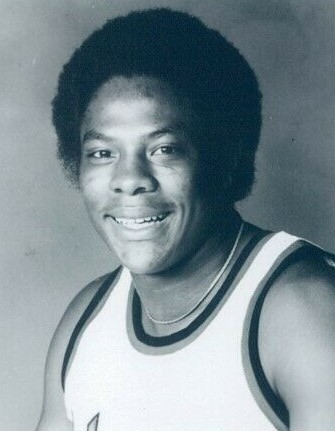

Personal information
- Born: May 31, 1956 (age 70) Kosciusko, Mississippi, U.S.
- Listed height: 6 ft 4 in (1.93 m)
- Listed weight: 211 lb (96 kg)

Career information
- High school: McAdams (McAdams, Mississippi)
- College: Kentucky State (1974–1978)
- NBA draft: 1978: 3rd round, 47th overall pick
- Drafted by: Houston Rockets
- Playing career: 1978–1990
- Position: Shooting guard
- Number: 12, 34, 35, 2
- Coaching career: 1979–1980

Career history

Playing
- 1978–1980: Maine Lumberjacks
- 1980–1982: Portland Trail Blazers
- 1982: Washington Bullets
- 1983: Los Angeles Lakers
- 1983–1984: Ohio Mixers
- 1983: Crispa Redmanizers
- 1984–1986: Fribourg Olympic
- 1986–1987: Charleston Gunners
- 1986–1988: Ginebra San Miguel
- 1990: Pensacola Tornados

Coaching
- 1979–1980: Maine Lumberjacks

Career highlights
- 3× PBA champion (1983 Reinforced Filipino, 1983 Open, 1986 Open); 2× PBA Best Import of the Conference (1983 Reinforced Filipino, 1983 Open); All-CBA First Team (1980); All-CBA Second Team (1979); CBA Rookie of the Year (1979); Philippine Basketball Association Hall of Fame inductee (2011)

Career NBA statistics
- Points: 2,197
- Rebound: 313
- Assists/Steals: 352/151
- Stats at NBA.com
- Stats at Basketball Reference

Billy Ray Bates (born May 31, 1956) is an American retired professional basketball player. Bates played shooting guard at McAdams High in Mississippi and attended Kentucky State University.

Bates played four seasons in the National Basketball Association for the Portland Trail Blazers, Washington Bullets, and Los Angeles Lakers. He also played overseas, in Switzerland, Mexico, Uruguay, and most notably in the Philippines for the Crispa Redmanizers and Ginebra San Miguel of the Philippine Basketball Association (PBA). Bates is considered one of the greatest foreign players in the PBA's history.

== NBA career ==
Billy Ray Bates, the eighth of nine children, played basketball at McAdams High in Mississippi. He later played basketball for Kentucky State University.

The Houston Rockets drafted him in the 3rd round of the 1978 draft. Before the season started, he was cut by the Rockets, after his agent demanded guaranteed money. He ended up playing for the Maine Lumberjacks in the now-defunct Continental Basketball Association, where he won the league's Rookie of the Year and the slam dunk competition in its all-star game. Bates is credited for shattering at least four backboards in the Continental league before jumping to the NBA. He served as head coach of the Lumberjacks for 12 games during the 1979–80 season and accumulated a 5–7 record.

After signing a 10-day contract with the Portland Trail Blazers in February 1980, the 6 ft 4 in (1.93 m), 211 lb (96 kilograms) guard became a crowd favorite for his slam dunks and energetic playing style. He once scored 40 points in 32 minutes against San Diego and later 35 points in 25 minutes against the Dallas Mavericks. He was named NBA Player of the Week towards the end of his rookie season. He averaged 25.0 points per game (ppg) in the 1980 playoffs and 28.3 ppg in the 1981 playoffs. As of 2025, this is the franchise record.

Bates played briefly with the Washington Bullets in the 1982–83 season, appearing in 15 games before being let go. He then had a 10-day trial with the Lakers and appeared in four games.

His average of 26.7 ppg in the playoffs is the highest in NBA history by a non-starter.

== PBA career ==
Bates began play in the Philippine Basketball Association (PBA) in 1983. His scoring ability, showmanship, and personality endeared him to the basketball-watching Filipino public and the media. He was called the Black Superman. A local shoe manufacturer produced a line of shoes for him to endorse, with his nickname on them.

Bates told The Oregonian: "They loved me ... There, I was like Michael Jordan. I could have anything I wanted. All I had to do was snap my fingers. I had my own condo, my own car and my own bodyguard with an Uzi. I had to fight off the women."

Bates won two Best Import awards and two championships for Crispa Redmanizers in 1983. Three years later, Bates and Michael Hackett joined forces to give Ginebra its first PBA title in 1986. He returned to Ginebra in 1987 leading all imports with a 54.9 ppg average. His last stint with Ginebra, then renamed Añejo, was in 1988; Bates played in four games, all of which the team lost, and he was released.

In Bates' four seasons in the PBA for Crispa and Ginebra, he averaged the all-time league high of 46.2 points in 98 career games.

Bates has been celebrated as one of the greatest foreign players to have played in the PBA. In October 2011, the PBA inducted him into its hall of fame. Bates flew into the Philippines to personally attend the ceremonies while expressing his fervent wish to work as a basketball coach in his "second home". The Philippine Patriots of the ASEAN Basketball League (ABL) hired him as its skills coach. On March 8, 2012, the Philippine Patriots fired him due to "repeated misconduct and acts detrimental to the team and to the league".

== Later professional career ==
Bates later played in Switzerland with the FIBA EuroLeague club Fribourg Olympic, during the 1985–86 season, back in the U.S. with the World Basketball League, a few seasons in Mexico, and a season in Uruguay.

== Personal life ==
Bates was born in 1956, the second-youngest of nine children, and was raised in Goodman, Mississippi, in a house with no plumbing and no electricity. After his father died when Billy Ray was seven years old, the children worked the fields to support their family. Bates attended school primarily to play basketball; he was able to slam dunk in his second year in high school, but he reportedly never learned to read full sentences. Like his late father, Billy Ray had experienced problems with alcoholism; he first tried malt liquor at age 10, and moonshine by age 14. His use of alcohol and cocaine had significant impacts on his career and health.

Bates has been described as a player unprepared for the lifestyle of a professional athlete. Jerome Kersey reported that when Bates arrived in Portland, a trainer for the Trail Blazers advised Bates to open a checking account so that he could pay his bills with checks, to which Bates replied, "What are checks?" His Filipino teammates recalled times when Bates drank beer in the locker room before tip-off. His teammates told a reporter that Bates was known for a flamboyant lifestyle, including frequent drinking, companionships with many women, and frivolous spending. It was reported that Bates' teammates on the Lakers were annoyed by him because the hair grease from his Jheri curl would get on the basketball and make it slippery.

On January 17, 1998, Bates robbed a Texaco gas station in Gloucester, New Jersey, at knifepoint. Bates served nearly five years at Bayside State Prison in Leesburg for first-degree aggravated assault and second-degree assault. He was paroled in March 2005, then 18 months later, he served another three months and 24 days in prison after violating his parole by failing a drug test.

In 2009, Bates had submitted an autobiography entitled Born to Play Basketball for publication. The manuscript was handwritten in ink and pencil, spanned 714 pages of legal paper, and required significant editing.

In 2025, during a live segment of Inside the NBA, Shaquille O'Neal said that Bates had died after fellow panelist Charles Barkley wondered aloud whether he was still alive. "I'm doing good for a dead man", Bates told NJ Advance Media. Ernie Johnson Jr., the host of Inside, apologized for the premature obituary, but O'Neal and Barkley did not.

== Career statistics ==
Legend
GP	Games played	GS	Games started	MPG	Minutes per game
FG%	Field goal percentage	3P%	3-point field goal percentage	FT%	Free throw percentage
RPG	Rebounds per game	APG	Assists per game	SPG	Steals per game
BPG	Blocks per game	PPG	Points per game	**Bold**	Career high

=== NBA ===
==== Regular season ====
Year	Team	GP	GS	MPG	FG%	3P%	FT%	RPG	APG	SPG	BPG	PPG
1979–80	Portland	16	0	14.7	**.493**	**.421**	.718	1.8	1.9	.9	.1	11.3
1980–81	Portland	**77**		**20.3**	.487	.259	**.854**	**2.0**	**2.5**	**1.1**	.1	**13.8**
1981–82	Portland	75	0	16.4	.473	.293	.787	1.4	1.5	.5	.1	11.1
1982–83	Washington	15	**3**	18.5	.411	.400	.500	1.2	.9	.9	**.2**	7.9
1982–83	L.A. Lakers	4	0	6.8	.125	–	.500	.3	.0	.3	.0	1.3
Career		187	3	17.8	.474	.303	796	1.7	1.9	.8	.1	11.7

==== Playoffs ====
Year	Team	GP	MPG	FG%	3P%	FT%	RPG	APG	SPG	BPG	PPG
1980	Portland	**3**	34.7	.525	.286	.786	**3.3**	4.0	**1.7**	**.3**	25.0
1981	Portland	**3**	**38.3**	**.565**	**1.000**	**.824**	2.3	**4.3**	**1.7**	**.3**	**28.3**
Career		6	36.5	.545	.375	.806	2.8	4.2	1.7	.3	26.7

=== PBA ===
Season	Team	GP	MPG	RPG	APG	PPG
1983	Crispa Redmanizers	49	46.2	10.9	6.1	41.7
1986	Ginebra San Miguel	22	47.4	13.5	5.5	49.6
1987	Ginebra San Miguel	23	46.5	15.0	5.2	54.9
1988	Añejo Rum 65	4	45.0	10.8	4.0	31.2
**Career**	**4 Seasons**	**98**	**46.5**	**12.4**	**5.7**	**46.2**
