= LGBTQ culture in the Philippines =

The lesbian, gay, bisexual, transgender and queer (LGBTQ) people in the Philippines are generally accepted in Filipino society, and it has been ranked among the most gay-friendly countries in Asia. It has the second highest social acceptance rate in the Asia-Pacific next to Australia, according to a Pew Research Center survey in 2013. Despite this, some discrimination still persists and LGBT people have limited LGBT-specific rights, leading some activists to characterize LGBT culture in the Philippines as "tolerated, but not accepted." Homosexuals in the Philippines are known as "bakla", though there are other terms to describe them. According to the 2002 Young Adult Fertility and Sexuality Survey, 11 percent of sexually active Filipinos between the ages of 15 and 24 have had sex with someone of the same sex. According to Filipino poet and critic Lilia Quindoza Santiago, Filipino culture may have a more flexible concept of gender. Kasarian (Tagalog for "gender") is defined in less binary terms than the English word; kasarian means "kind, species, or genus".

== History ==
Gender-crossing practices go back to the history of pre-colonial communities in the Philippines. The babaylans are typically female spiritual leaders, priests, or shamans in native communities, whose position can also be taken by males who crossed genders, and were called asog, among many names. Effeminate people, together with the weak, were handled gently during pre-colonial inter-tribal raids (mangayaw) on enemy settlements. According to J. Neil C. Garcia, the feminized men were similar to women in almost all aspects, except for childbearing.

Movements to promote the acceptance of gay people in Philippine society include, but are not limited to, the establishment of the Home for the Golden Gays by Justo Justo, the 1980 Women's Movement which focused on the lesbian struggle of Filipinas, the formation of The Lesbian Collective which was the first formal lesbian organization in the country, and the organization of the first LGBT Pride March in Asia and the Pacific on 26 June 1994 by Pro-Gay Philippines and Metropolitan Community Church Manila. The 1994 Pride March was organized in connection with the 25th commemoration of the Stonewall uprising in New York in 1969. Notable organizers were Murphy Red and Rev. Fr. Richard Mickley, then an MCC clergy, and now retired. There are, however, other individuals and groups who believe that the first pride march in the Philippines was in 1996. Beyond this, there have been numerous efforts to spread awareness of LGBT people. The community has become generally accepted in society, and has continued to initiate efforts that aim for greater acceptance, protection, and empowerment of its members.

== Representation in indigenous mythologies ==
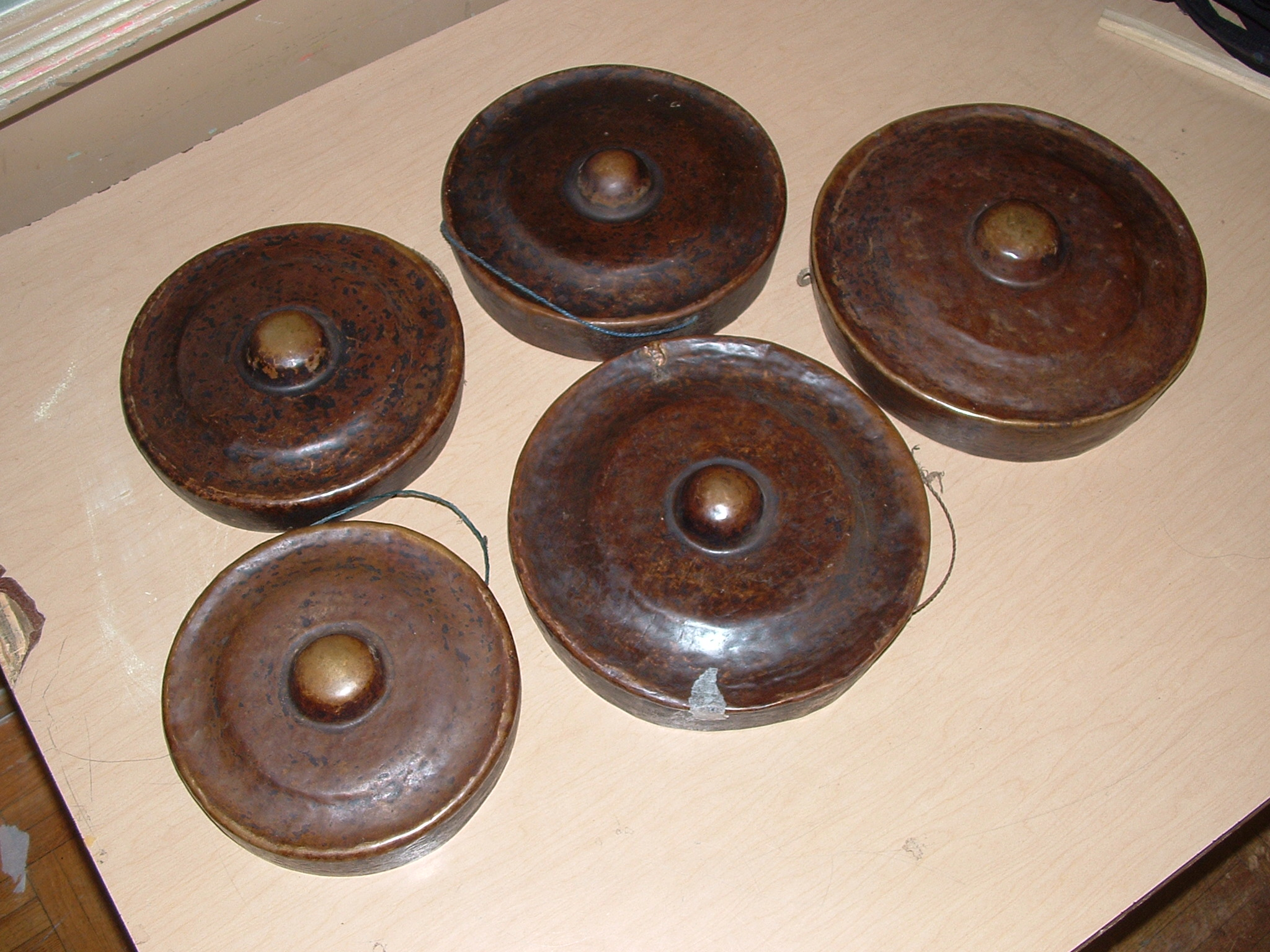
Gongs of the Teduray people. The Teduray bases their concept of gender towards their ethnic beliefs, with a hermaphrodite woman being called mentefuwaley libun and hermaphrodite man being called mentefuwaley lagey.

Prior to the introduction of Islam to the archipelago and the subsequent colonization by Spain and other European Christians, the region that would become the Philippines was inhabited largely by tribes and larger feudal states that practiced anito animism and Hindu-Buddhist polytheism. Those mythologies included hermaphrodite gods and goddesses like Lakapati (or Ikapati), the goddess of fertility and good harvest, who was described as an androgynous, intersex, or hermaphrodite goddess. Lakapati is a hermaphrodite and a major fertility deity in the Tagalog mythology. Her prowess on fertility covers not only human and divine fertility, but also the fertility of all other things such as wildlife, crops, trees, and plants. She is also the goddess of cultivated land. A prayer dedicated to Lakapati was recited by children when sowing seeds: "Lakapati, pakanin mo yaring alipin mo; huwag mong gutumin" ("Lakapati, feed this thy slave; let him not hunger").

In Waray mythology, the supreme creator deity has both female and male aspects. Usually spoken of in her female aspect, Malaon ("the ancient one"), she was regarded as a more sympathetic deity of justice and equality. However, her male aspect, Makapatag (literally "the leveler"), is regarded as a destructive deity of punishment and vengeance. She was also a major deity (usually of creation, the sky, or agriculture) for most other Visayan groups, usually under the name Laon or Laonsina.

According to the scholar and linguist Jean-Paul Potet (2017), there is no information regarding the gender of Bathala in the early Spanish accounts of the Tagalog religion. The term may have been used as an epicene one by the Tagalog people, but the use of the Sanskrit-derived masculine term also suggests that the deity's gender might be male. In a similar vein, the Tagalog word hari (meaning "sovereign") is also mentioned as an epicene or genderless term by Potet, since the term is not exclusive to male-gendered sovereigns, but also to those who are of the female gender.

In Suludnon mythology, there are accounts of female binukots (well-kept maidens) who had the power to transform into male warriors. The most famous of these are Nagmalitong Yawa and Matan-ayon. In one epic, after Buyong Humadapnon was captured by the magical binukot Sinangkating Bulawan, the also powerful female binukot, Nagmalitong Yawa, cast her magic and transformed into a male warrior named Buyong Sumasakay. He afterwards successfully rescued the warrior Buyong Humadapnon. In a similar epic, the female binukot Matan-ayon, in search of her husband Labaw Donggon, sailed the stormy seas using the golden ship Hulinday together with her less powerful brother-in-law Paubari. Once, when she was bathing after sailing a long way, Buyong Pahagunong spotted her and tried to make her his bride. The event was followed by a series of battles, where in one instance, Matan-ayon transformed into the male warrior Buyong Makalimpong. Labaw Donggon arrives and attacks Buyong Pahagunong, while Buyong Makalimpong once again transformed into Matan-ayon. Matan-ayon then has a conversation with the supreme goddess Laonsina about why the men are fighting, and they agree to sit back and watch them if they truly are seeking death.

== Nomenclature ==
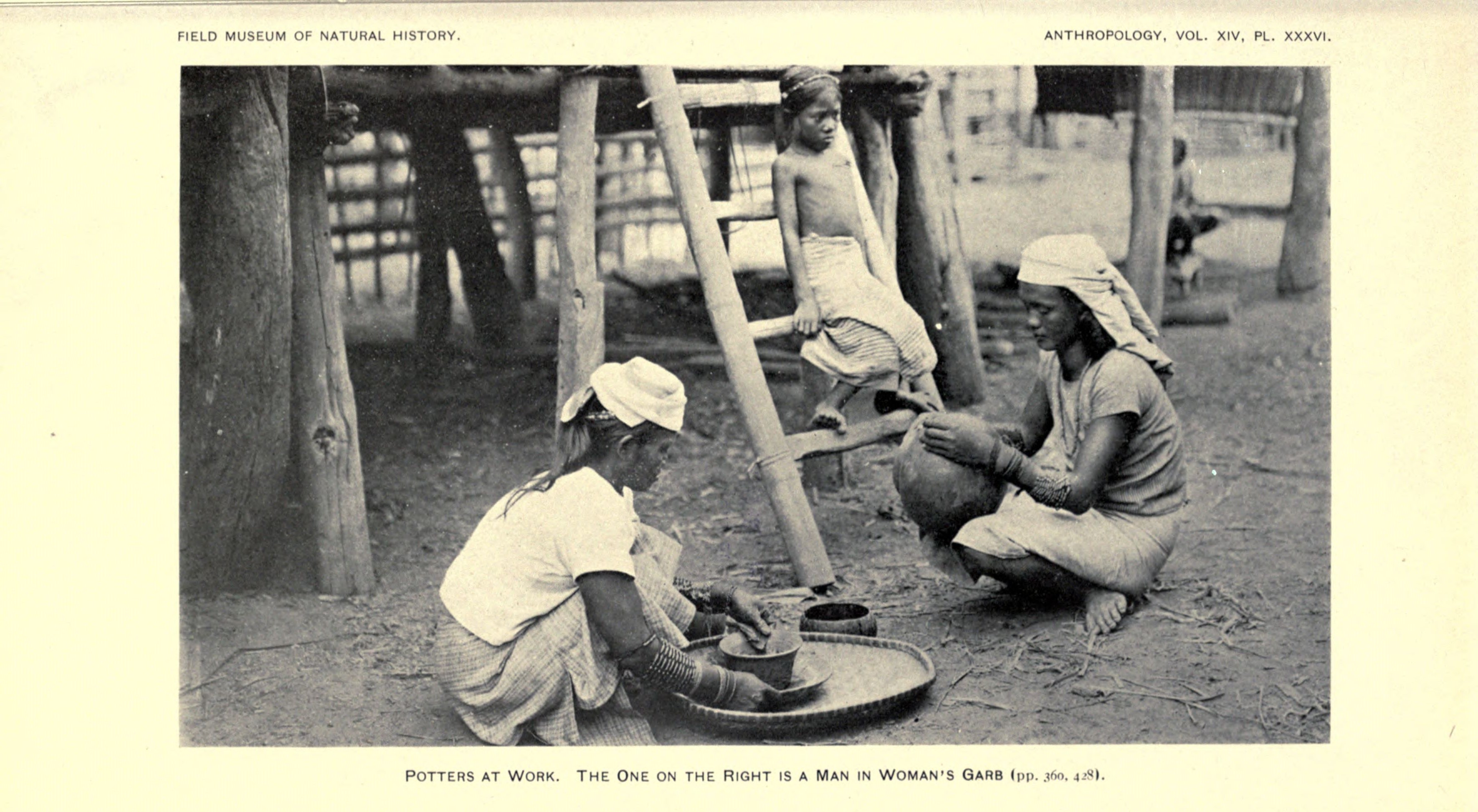
Itneg potters, the person on the right is wearing women's clothes (c. 1922)

Bakla and bading are Tagalog words for a man who has feminine mannerisms, or dresses or identifies as a woman. Although the terms are not the equivalent of the English "gay", the bakla are the most culturally visible subset of gay men in the Philippines. They are often considered a third gender, embodying femininity (pagkababae) in a male body. Although bakla is sometimes used in a derogatory sense, bakla people have largely embraced it. In addition to this, lesbians in the Filipino community are called tibo or tibs, which are likewise often used as derogatory terms. However, lesbians too have recently embraced this terms, and have used these terms jokingly to refer to each other. But despite being used to refer to lesbians, the word tibo or tibs often refer to the more masculine lesbian, otherwise known as the "butch".

In the Philippines, the word "gay" is used to refer to any LGBT person. For Filipino gays the Tagalog phrase paglaladlad ng kapa ("unfurling the cape") or, more commonly, paglaladlad ("unfurling" or "unveiling") refers to the coming-out process. Some lesbians (butch and femme) use the words magic or shunggril to refer to themselves; paminta describes masculine gay men. Neutral slang terms for gay men include "billy boy", badette, "badaf" and bading. Although many of these terms are considered derogatory, they are sometimes used casually or jokingly by the Filipino gay and lesbian community.

== Rights ==
Although legislation supporting same-sex marriage in the Philippines has been proposed several times in the Philippine legislature, none has been passed. The Philippine Commission on Elections (COMELEC) disqualified the Filipino LGBT political party Ladlad from fronting a candidate in the 2007 general election, concluding that the party did not have a nationwide membership. COMELEC again refused Ladlad's petition to contest the 2010 elections on the grounds of "immorality". However, on 8 April 2010, the Supreme Court of the Philippines overturned COMELEC's decision and allowed Ladlad to participate in the May 2010 elections.

The Philippines has been ranked one of the most gay-friendly nations in the world and is the most gay-friendly in Asia. In a survey of 39 countries (only 17 of which had a majority accepting homosexuality), the Philippines were the 10th most gay-friendly. The survey, "The Global Divide on Homosexuality" conducted by the US-based Pew Research Center, showed that 73 percent of adult Filipinos agreed that "homosexuality should be accepted by society" (up from 64 percent in 2002).

=== LGBT Rights Bill (SOGIE Bill) ===
The House of Representatives approved LGBT Rights on 20 September 2017. The lawmakers had voted 198–0 to approve House Bill 4982, otherwise known as the Sexual Orientation and Gender Identity and Expression Equality (SOGIE) Bill. Violating this law carries penalties of ₱100,000 to ₱500,000 fines, and imprisonment for one to six years. This bill prohibits and penalizes any discriminatory acts against Lesbians, Gays, Bisexuals, and Transgender people.

The SOGIE Bill penalizes the following acts:

- Gender Profiling
- Denying or revoking a professional or other similar license or clearance, except marriage license, issued by the government
- Denying access to public service, including military service
- Refusing admission or expelling a person from any educational or training institution
- Denying a person access to public or private medical and other health services open to the general public

== Language ==
Swardspeak, or "gay lingo", is cant or argot derived from Taglish (Tagalog-English pidgin) and is used by the Filipino LGBT community. It uses elements of Tagalog, English, Spanish and Japanese, celebrities' names and trademarked brands, giving them new meanings in different contexts. Words derived from indigenous languages, including Cebuano, Hiligaynon, Waray, Bikol and others, are also used by LGBT communities.

A Swardspeak speaker could be identified as homosexual, making it easier for people in the LGBT community to recognize each other. This created a group of speakers, helping the community resist cultural assimilation and marginalization. Straight people have begun to use Swardspeak, however, particularly in gay-dominated industries such as fashion and film.

== Politics ==
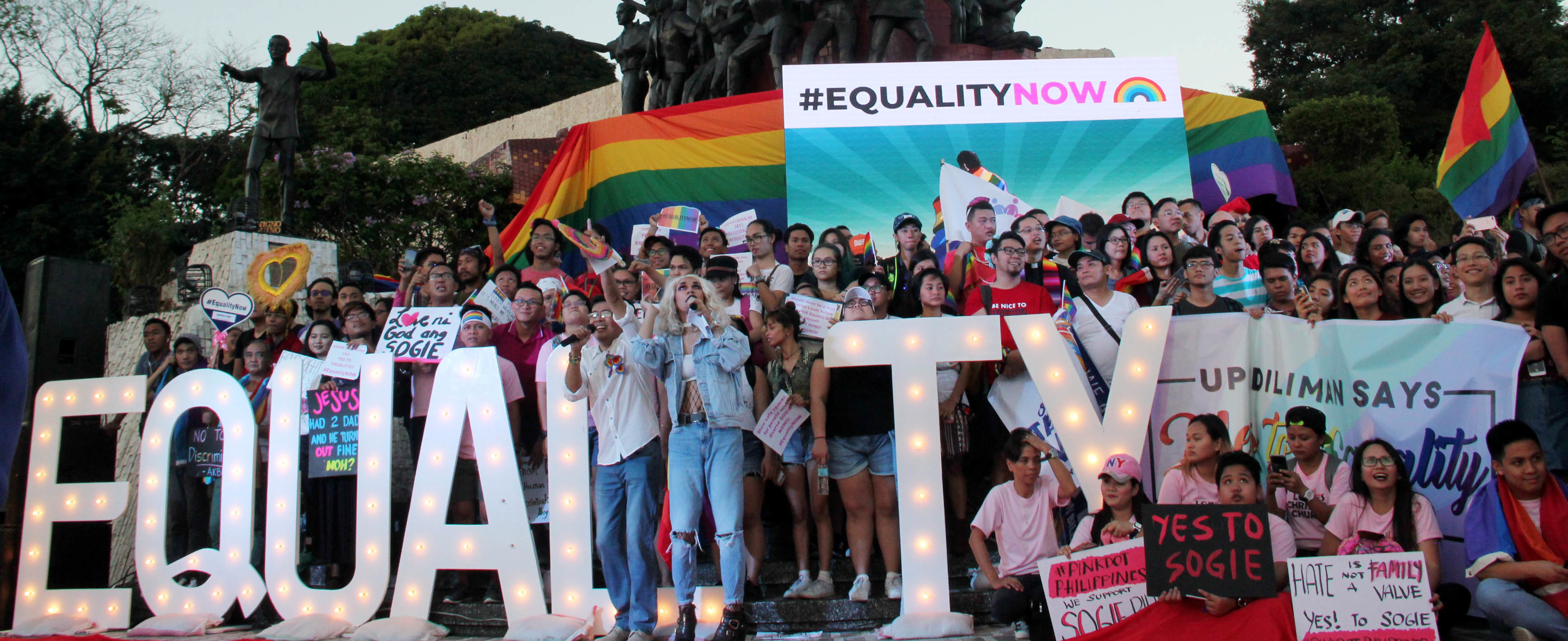
March 2018 rally at the People Power Monument by supporters of the SOGIE Equality Bill, a proposed legislation tackling LGBT rights in the country.

While there are no laws pertaining to same-sex marriage or unions, Open Table MCC Church, a local church (in Mandaluyong, Philippines) of the Universal Fellowship of Metropolitan Community Churches (UFMCC), cites freedom of religion in sanctioning what it calls holy unions. These ceremonies are conducted solely for the purpose of celebrating love and are not legally recognized. According to the United Nations, when participating in the political dialogue, political representation is important. Because of this, the existence of LGBT political party Ang Ladlad and their representation of the LGBT community in politics is important. The Filipino Ang Ladlad party, whose founders, leaders, and core constituency belong to the LGBT community, was recognized by the government and participated in party elections in 2013.

Transnational networks such as LGBT non-government organizations allow connected brokers in the Philippines to widely adopt goals and strategies that are cross-culturally recognizable. Efforts to pass an anti-discrimination bill that prohibits using sexual orientation and gender identity as a basis for discrimination is an example. Goals and tactics used in the Philippines such as emphasis on "sexual orientation" and "gender identity" as a distinct part of the self, the idea of being "out", and pursuit of rights-based remedies are hallmarks of transnational LGBT politics.

The diffusion of LGBT subjectivities affected by the shifts in the global system allow studies exploring links between LGBT advocacy and hegemonic geopolitics to increase. An example is through the non-relational diffusion though media, technology, and shifts in democracy and neoliberalism. According to Oscar Atadero, one of the organizers of the 1994 Pride in Manila, the decline of interest in a style of mobilization that is public and militant and the failure of mass movement in the Philippines can be attributed to "the sudden appearance of the Internet at the same time gays and lesbians were forming political movements".

There are, however, notable movements as well. One mobilization was Ladlad's "immoRALLY" in front of the COMELEC office in Manila, two weeks after the rejection of their petition for party-list accreditation in the 2010 elections. The protest rally was held after COMELEC rejected the petition based on moral grounds, claiming that the LGBT people are not immoral. The event brought together national organizations such as Babaylan, Task Force Pride, and the Akbayan party-list to protest the charge against the LGBTs.

Geraldine Roman is the first transgender person to be elected to the Philippine congress. She has been a staunch advocate of an anti-discrimination bill. Perci Cendaña who was the first openly gay person to sit on the UP Diliman University Student Council was subsequently elected as member of the House of Representatives after Akbayan was proclaimed as the Commission on Elections proclaimed it as a winner after the Supreme Court of the Philippines upheld the COMELEC Resolution which revoked the party-list's registration of An Waray.

Entertainers Ice Seguerra and Arnell Ignacio are the first LGBT-community members appointed as government officials; they were appointed by President Rodrigo Duterte chair of the National Youth Commission and vice-chair of the Philippine Amusement and Gaming Corporation, respectively.

In December 2019, Duterte appointed trans activist Dindi Tan as director of the Department of Agrarian Reform.

The Communist Party of the Philippines, a Marxist-Leninist-Maoist political organization, has recognized same-sex relationships within its membership since 1998.

== Media ==
The Philippine media and show business scene—encompassing film, radio, and television—is a vital part of LGBT culture in terms of representation. Prominent celebrities including Vice Ganda and Boy Abunda are all featured in major programs and are often tapped to endorse major products and services.

In 2004, the Republic of the Philippines Movie and Television Review and Classification Board (MTRCB) disseminated a memorandum calling homosexual relationships—particularly lesbian relationships—an "abnormality of human nature", discouraging producers from broadcasting any sort of portrayals that promoted these relationships. While there are still several LGBT personalities in show business, as well as LGBT characters in films and television programs in the Philippines, notices such as these have limited particular LGBT portrayals in the Philippine media. While there is an acknowledgement of LGBT people, there is also a lack of understanding, leading to stereotyped portrayals dominating the media.

For the gay Filipino man, two main stereotypes have been revealed in studies to be dominantly presented in media. There is the feminine gay who often cross-dresses, demonstrates stereotypically feminine actions and speech, and is attracted to stereotypically masculine men. The following films have portrayals of the feminine gay:

- Markova: Comfort Gay
- Aishite Imasu: 1941: Mahal Kita
- Ang Pagdadalaga ni Maximo Oliveros
- Petrang Kabayo

In contrast to this is the masculine gay portrayal, where the men still appear stereotypically masculine but are attracted to the same sex. A cited example of this is the film In My Life.

Lesbianism in Philippine media has also been studied with two common stereotypes emerging: the butch and the femme. The two are often seen in a butch-femme dichotomy, where in a lesbian couple one assumes the traditional roles of the masculine-male and the feminine-female, respectively. Femme-to-femme relationships, when depicted, have been shown more often as abused or ridiculed couples in a more heteronormative society. The following teleseries are recent portrayals of femme-to-femme lesbian relationships in the Philippines:

- The Rich Man's Daughter (2015)
- Baka Bukas (2016)

Die Beautiful, a 2016 comedy-drama narrating the life (and death) of a transgender beauty queen, was entered into the 2016 Metro Manila Film Festival and won two awards at the Tokyo International Film Festival in 2016.

LGBT representation outside of television and films has been made through existence of gay beauty pageants such as Miss Gay Philippines. It is in this competition that all manner of gays, men or women, as well as transgender and bisexuals are eligible to enter, granted that they first meet the qualifications/requirements of the pageant. However, the organization of these events has been met with controversy in certain cases. For example, in 2013, at the 9th Cinemalaya Philippine Independent Film Festival awards, transgender woman Mimi Juareza was still considered under the "male" category as Best Actor and referred to with the pronoun "he".

In August 2021, Manila Luzon (a contestant from RuPaul's Drag Race) announced that a Philippine drag competition series was in the works, with the casting call open. The series was later called Drag Den with eight drag queens competing. Afterwards, RuPaul announced a casting call for a Philippine adaptation of RuPaul's Drag Race named Drag Race Philippines, which included twelve drag queens competing.

== Events ==
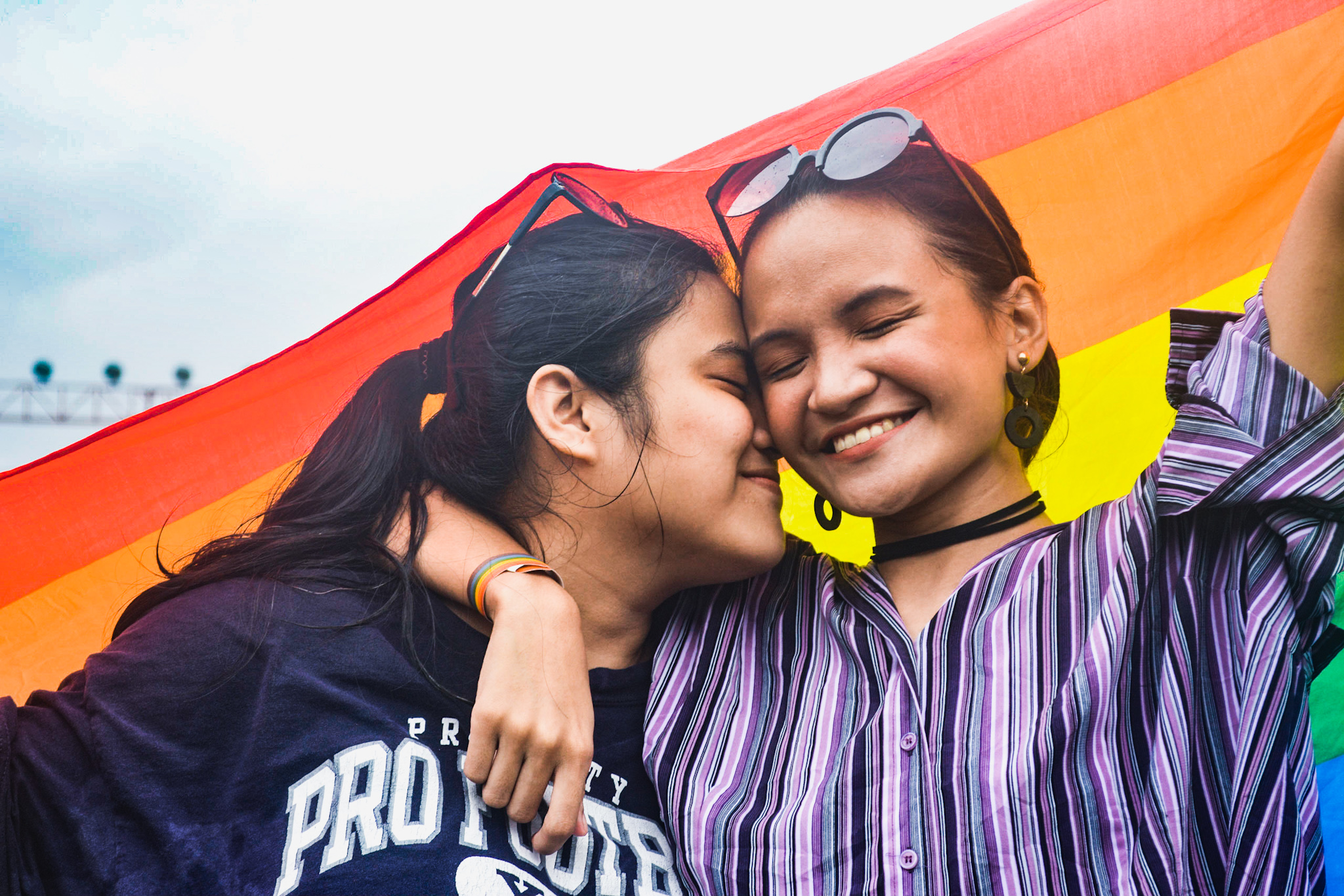
2019 Metro Manila Pride.

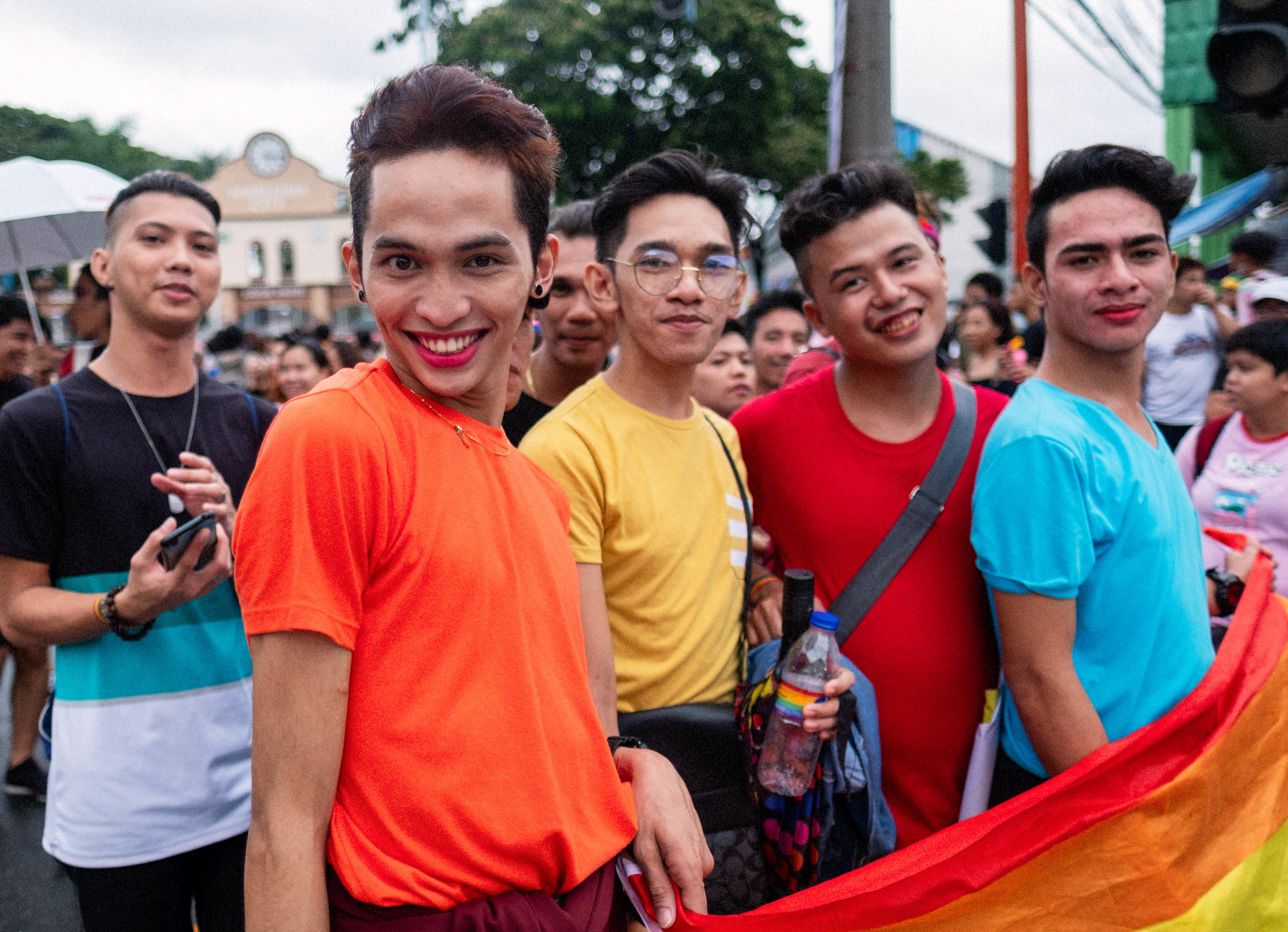
2019 Metro Manila Pride.

With the general tolerance of the country towards the LGBT community, its members have organized a number of events in the past years to empower the Filipino community in creating a safe space for the LGBT community. Since the First Pride March in 1994, the LGBT community has continued to celebrate this event in the month of June.

The more recent Pride Marches have become more visible to the public with its organizers' use of social media to promote the advocacy, and the events.

=== More Recent Metro Manila Pride Marches ===
2015 - Fight For Love

The 21st Metro Manila Pride March in 2015, entitled Fight For Love, was held on 25 July. The turnout of the event was estimated at 2,000 participants.

2016 - Let Love In

The following Metro Manila Pride March was themed Let Love In. There was uncertainty whether or not the event would take place due to the Orlando Nightclub Shooting, but the event still took place. The march began at Luneta Park on 25 June 2016.

2017 - #HereTogether

Pride March in 2017 was entitled #HereTogether. On 24 June that year, members and supporters of the LGBT Community gathered at Plaza de los Alcaldes, Marikina to begin the 2017 Metro Manila Pride March.

2018 - #RiseUpTogether

The 2018 Metro Manila Pride March, which took place on 30 June 2018 and began at Marikina Sports Center, was themed #RiseUpTogether. Compared to the previous year with about 7,700 participants, this year's Pride March round up to 20,000 attendees.

2019 - #ResistTogether

Held at the Marikina Sports Complex, the 2019 Pride was themed #ResistTogether, which fashioned the march as a celebration of the country's diversity and a protest against homophobia, biphobia, and transphobia. The pride also focused on the passage and support for the SOGIE Equality Bill in Congress. Attendance in the 2019 march peaked at 70,000 people, almost thrice the number from the 2018 march.

== LGBT organizations ==
- Alpha Nu: Begun in 2014 and considered the Philippines' first openly gay fraternity, Alpha Nu is recognized by the University of the Philippines-Diliman and advocates non-violent initiations, gender sensitivity and psychological support. It holds annual forums on HIV awareness.
- USeP Maharlika: The first LGBT student organization at the University of Southeastern Philippines, established in 2013
- PUP Kabaro: A gender-equality activist organization at the Polytechnic University of the Philippines
- UP Babaylan: Established in 1992, UP Babaylan is the first LGBT student organization in the Philippines and is the only LGBT support and advocacy student group at the University of the Philippines Diliman in Metro Manila.
- Bahaghari: The national alliance of LGBTQIA+ advocates, organizations, and formations in the Philippines.
- Doll House: A community group for open-minded individuals at Ateneo de Manila University
- ProGay Philippines (Progressive Organization of Gays in the Philippines): A gay-rights organization in Metro Manila that led the Asia and Pacific's first Pride March in the Philippines in 1994.
- Open Table Metropolitan Community Church: A local progressive, ecumenical and LGBT affirming church Mandaluyong
  - Open Table MCC - the Mandaluyong church of Metropolitan Community Church

Can't Live in the Closet: Lesbian activist group in Metro Manila

- Lesbian Advocates Philippines (LeAP): Metro Manila
- Lunduyan ng Sining (Sanctuary of Art): Registered lesbian art studio, providing a venue for lesbian art. The studio has produced a lesbian literary and art folio, What These Hands Can Do, and holds monthly music, film or art performances at Mag:net Katipunan in Quezon City
- IWAG: Social and support group in Davao City
- Northern Samar LGBT Community (NSLGBT): Northern Samar
- GAHUM: A gay support and advocacy group in Cebu City
- Rainbow Rights (R-Rights) Philippines (formerly the Rainbow Rights Project): Non-profit, non-partisan, non-governmental organization to create an environment which upholds human rights and equal opportunities for all, regardless of sexual orientation and gender identity or expression (SOGIE).
- Society of Transsexual Women of the Philippines (STRAP): Metro Manila
- PinoyFTM: Founded in July 2011 as the first organization for transsexual and transgender men in the Philippines. Based in Metro Manila, it has members throughout the Philippines.
- Order of St. Aelred: Spiritual gay center in Metro Manila
- AKOD: Gay support group at the Davao Oriental State College of Science and Technology
- Gorgeous and Young (GAY): Support group
- Philippine Financial and Inter-Industry Pride: The Philippine Financial & Inter- Industry Pride (PFIP) is a collaborative, voluntary, and not-for-profit community composed of dedicated representatives from LGBT+ Employee Resource Groups (ERGs) or Human Resource / Diversity teams of the financial services industry and associate partner organizations. The PFIP aims to foster working environments that are safe and inclusive for the LGBT+ community.
- Philippine Forum on Sports, Culture, Sexuality and Human Rights (Team Pilipinas): A forum promoting human rights, sexual and gender diversity and equality through sports, culture and recreation
- UPLB Babaylan: LGBT organization and support group at the University of the Philippines Los Baños; promotes gender equality among the student body and beyond. Sponsors Pink Flicks (a film festival focusing on gender issues), symposiums, educational discussions and gatherings with other LGBT organizations.
- Lakapati Laguna: A national democratic organization and alliance of LGBTQI organizations and individuals in Laguna.
- Southern Tagalog Pride: The premier alliance of LGBTQ and ally organizations, federations, gender desks, Pride councils, and individuals in Region IV (CALABARZON and MIMAROPA)
- Metro Manila Pride: Umbrella organization for the annual Metro Manila Pride events
- Quezon City Pride Council (QCPC): A pioneering initiative of the Quezon City government and the first of its kind in the country, it is a council to enforce LGBT rights and gender-based policies and programs. Created by Mayor Herbert Bautista with an office order, it was launched on 25 March 2013 to highlight the city government's support for the implementation and enforcement of gender-based policies, programs and activities.
- Equality Philippines (EqualityPH): Non-profit organization to promote and safeguard the rights of LGBT members and allies in the Philippines
- True Colors Coalition (TCC): Political LGBT organization to continue the community's struggle for equality, acceptance and freedom by organizing, educating and mobilizing the community and its allies and campaigning to end all forms of discrimination. TCC is a member of Kilusan para sa Pambansang Demokrasya (KILUSAN).
- CSU Crystal: Campus-wide student organization established in 2024 at Cagayan State University - Andrews Campus. During its establishment, it was the sole student-organization catering for the LGBTQ community in the entire Cagayan province.

== See also ==
- LGBT culture
- LGBT rights in the Philippines
- Sexuality in the Philippines
- Single mother phenomenon of Philippines
