= Metro Manila Pride March =

LGBT event in Metro Manila, Philippines

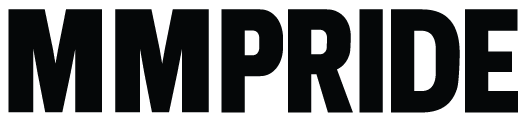
- Genre: Pride parade and festival
- Frequency: Every June (1996–2002, 2015–); Every December (2003–2014)
- Inaugurated: 1996
- Organizer: Reachout Foundation (1996–1998); Task Force Pride (1999–2015); Metro Manila LGBTQ+ Pride, Inc. (2016–)
- Website: mmpride.org

Metro Manila Pride March and Festival is an annual pride parade in Metro Manila, Philippines organized by the Metro Manila Pride (MM Pride) organization.

== History ==
=== Reach Out Foundation era (1996–1998) ===
The first Metro Manila Pride was held in 1996. This edition is often regarded as the first ever pride parade in the Philippines, with the 1994 Stonewall Manila parade by the MCC and Progay and the Lesbian March of 1993 as contenders for this recognition. The 1996 march banks on having relatively more larger amount of attendees.

The Reach Out Foundation (ROF), a HIV/AIDS network, was originally the lead organization for the Metro Manila Pride march. ROF provided the funding while other affiliate organizations were relegated to providing logistical support.

The inaugural march named Solidarity 96, was dubbed by its organizers as the "first gay and lesbian pride march in Southeast Asia" with 30 organizations in attendance. After 1998, ROF relinquished its role from leading the march's organization.

=== Task Force Pride era (1999–2015) ===
When Akbayan gained a seat in the House of Representatives in 1998 through the party-list system, it had consultations with various LGBT organizations which led to the creation of LAGABLAB which is advocacy group which focused on lobbying legislation and Task Force Pride (TFP) which would take over pride march organizing duties from ROF starting 1999.

The Metro Manila Pride march would deal with the withdrawal of funding from the ROF, relying on donations from LGBT groups. LAGABLAB would deal with several years of inactivity and the TFP would have times having only three active members.

In 2003, the TFP moved the annual event's date to December. From the 2015 edition, the pride march is held every June once again. This is when attendance started to rise exponentially.

=== Current iteration (2016–) ===
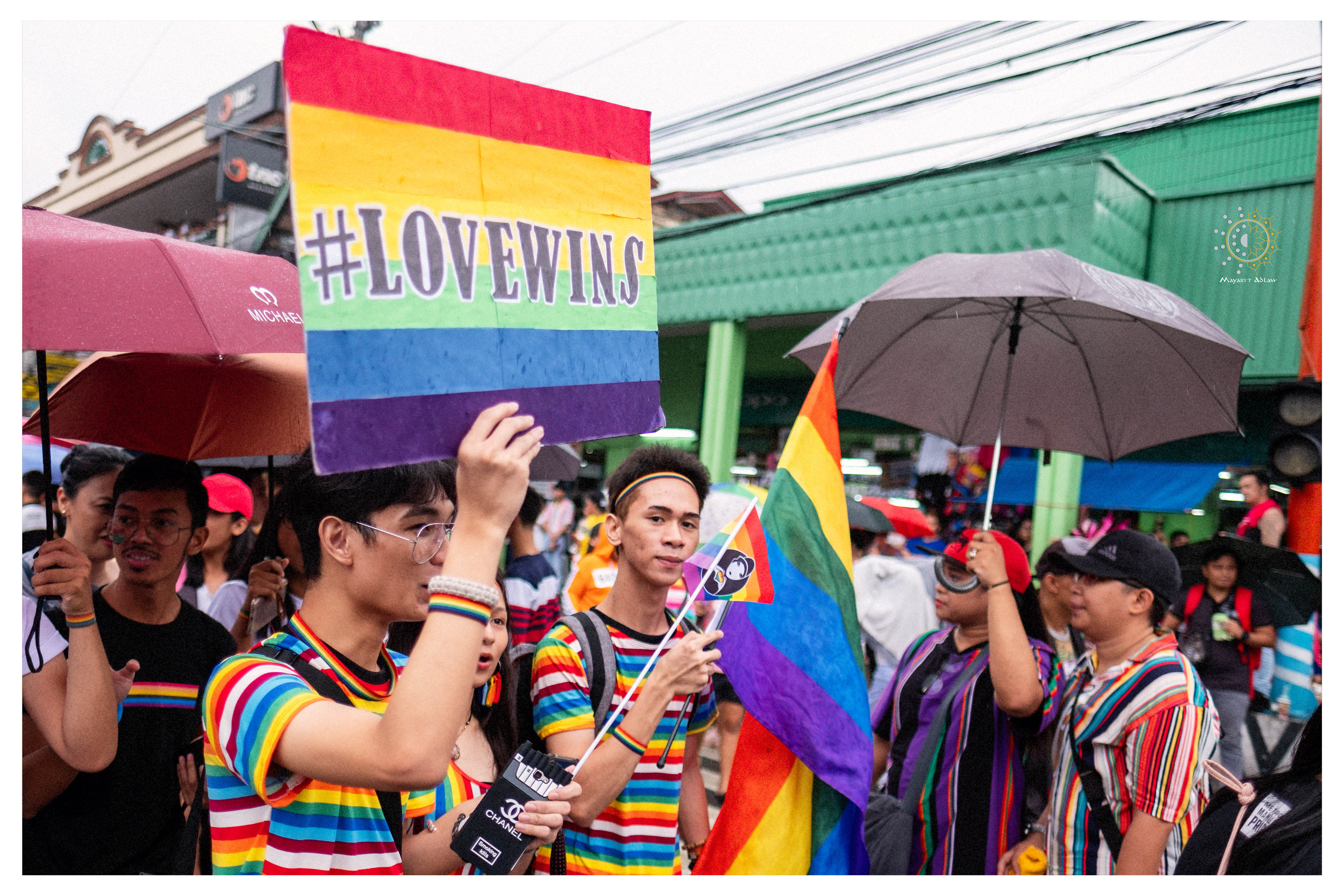
2019 edition

The Metro Manila Pride (MM Pride) would be organized, and would take over the conduct of the pride march from Task Force Pride since the 2016 edition.

The 2019 edition would see 70,000 attendees and the Metro Manila Pride march by this time would be branded by its organizers as the "largest in Southeast Asia".

For 2020 and 2021, the event would be held virtually due to the COVID-19 pandemic.

== Editions ==
Year	Theme	Estimated attendance	Notes
2012		1,500	
2013		1,000	
2014		1,000+	
2015		2,000	
2013		1,000	
2014		1,000	
2015	Fight For Love: Iba-Iba. Sama-Sama (lit. 'Diverse, Together')	2,000	
2016	Let Love In. Kahit Kanino, Kahit Kailan. (lit. 'To whoever, whenever')	5,000	
2017		8,000	
2018		25,000	
2019		70,000	
2020	SULONG! Wag Patinag! (lit. 'Onward! Don't waver')		Virtual event due to the COVID-19 pandemic
2021	SULONG, VAKLASH (lit. 'Onward! Bakla/Break-off')		Virtual event due to the COVID-19 pandemic
2022	AtinAngKulayaan: Makibeki Ngayon, Atin ang Panahon! (lit. 'Our independence: fight now, it's our time!')	29,000	
2023	Tayo ang Kulayaan! Samot-saring Lakas, Sama-sama sa Landas!		
2024	Not held		
2026	Bukas, Atin!		
