= Stonewall Manila =

1994 protest

- Date: June 26, 1994
- Location: Quezon City, Metro Manila, Philippines
- Type: Pride parade, protest
- Organized by: Metropolitan Community Church; Progressive Organization of Gays in the Philippines
- Participants: approx. 50–60 people

Stonewall Manila, or the Pride Revolution, was a historic pro-LGBT and anti-price hike demonstration held in Quezon City, Metro Manila on June 26, 1994.

== Event ==
The 1994 pride march was organized by the Metropolitan Community Church (MCC) and the Progressive Organization of Gays in the Philippines (Progay) on June 26 and was dubbed as Stonewall Manila as a 25th anniversary commemoration of the 1969 riots in Stonewall Inn in the United States. It was alternatively known as the Pride Revolution.

The parade's route started from the intersection of EDSA and Quezon Avenue until the Quezon City Memorial Circle.

It was attended by roughly 50 to 60 people.

The march ended at the foot of the Quezon Memorial Shrine where a mass was held by MCC pastor Richard Mickley. The document dubbed as The Gay Manifesto was read where Progay's called for better social conditions for the LGBT community, especially those who are also indigents.

== Goals ==
According to Progay, there were three goals for the demonstration.

- Commemoration of the 1969 Stonewall riots
- Express opposition to discrimination against LGBT people
- Express opposition to the implementation of Value Added Tax and oil price hike

== Aftermath ==
There was minimal newspaper coverage at the time but the march would eventually get sufficient media traction. MCC pastor Richard Mickey recalls getting invited on the talk show Mel and Jay which was popular in the Philippines at the time.

== Legacy ==
Stonewall Manila is often regarded as the first ever pride march in Asia. Although the nature of the event as a pride march is due to subject matters raised were not all LGBT-specific issues (e.g. Oil price hike).

Other dissenting views on the label of event as the first pride march in the Philippines or as a pride march at all include:

- The lack of representation outside of gay and bisexual men such as lesbians and trans women.
- The militant nature of the event arguably makes the event more of a radical protest rather than a pride march
- The Lesbian March in March 1992 by the Lesbian Collective precedes the MCC and Progay march.

In 1996, the inaugural Metro Manila Pride was held, which is considered by some to be the true first pride march due to its larger scale than relatively small 1994 demonstration.

== See also ==
- Stonewall riots
- LGBTQ culture in the Philippines
- LGBTQ rights in the Philippines
- Metro Manila Pride March
