= Rosa Henson =

Filipina writer

- Henson in March 1996
- Born: December 5, 1927
- Died: August 18, 1997 (aged 69)
- Other name: "Lola Rosa"

María Rosa Luna Henson or "Lola Rosa" ("Grandma Rosa") (December 5, 1927 – August 18, 1997) was the first Filipina who made public in 1992 her story as a comfort woman (military sex slave) for the Imperial Japanese Army during the Second World War.

== Biography ==
Maria Rosa Luna Henson was born in Pasay City on December 5, 1927. She grew up in poverty in Pampanga in the Central Luzon region with her single mother, Julia. Born the illegitimate child of Don Pepe, a wealthy landowner, Henson saw her father sporadically throughout her childhood. Growing up she dreamed of being a doctor. After World War II started, Henson became a member of the Hukbalahap, a Communist guerrilla movement resisting the Japanese invaders. In 1942 Henson was first raped by three Japanese soldiers while getting firewood for her family, two weeks later, she was raped again. In April 1943 while with her comrades, Henson was taken by Japanese soldiers and led to the local Japanese headquarters where she was forced to be a “comfort woman.” In August 1943, Henson and the other girls were transferred to a larger building in Angeles, Pampanga where the rape continued. Recounting her experience in her book Comfort Woman: Slave of Destiny, "Twelve soldiers raped me in quick succession, after which I was given half an hour to rest. Then twelve more soldiers followed." "I could not eat. I felt much pain and my vagina was swollen. I cried and cried, calling my mother. I could not resist the soldiers because they might kill me. So what else could I do?" In January 1944, Hukbalahap guerrillas attacked the building and freed Henson. After nine months of being a comfort woman, Henson greatly suffered psychologically and physically. She eventually married a young soldier named Domingo and had three children: Rosario (August 1947), Rosalinda (September 1949), and Jesus (December 1951). Domingo died in November 1953. Starting in 1957, Henson worked in a cigarette factory for thirty-four years.

In 1992, when Henson was 65, she decided it was time to tell the world about her experience during the Japanese occupation of the Philippines during the war. Until 1992, only two people had known of her secret: her late mother and her dead husband. After coming out publicly with her story at a press conference in September 1992, Lola Rosa decided to write about her war-time experience in the book, Comfort Woman: Slave of Destiny.

In Comfort Woman: Slave of Destiny, Lola Rosa discussed the silent and invisible existence of Filipino comfort women. Fifty Filipino women soon followed Rosa's example as they decided to reveal themselves and their personal stories for the first time—not only to the world but to their families as well. Other victims, including those from Korea and China, joined the Filipino women to file a class action lawsuit against the Japanese government in December 1993. The suit sought a formal apology from the Japanese government; the inclusion of all the war-time atrocities committed by the Japanese into Japan's school history books; and monetary reparations.

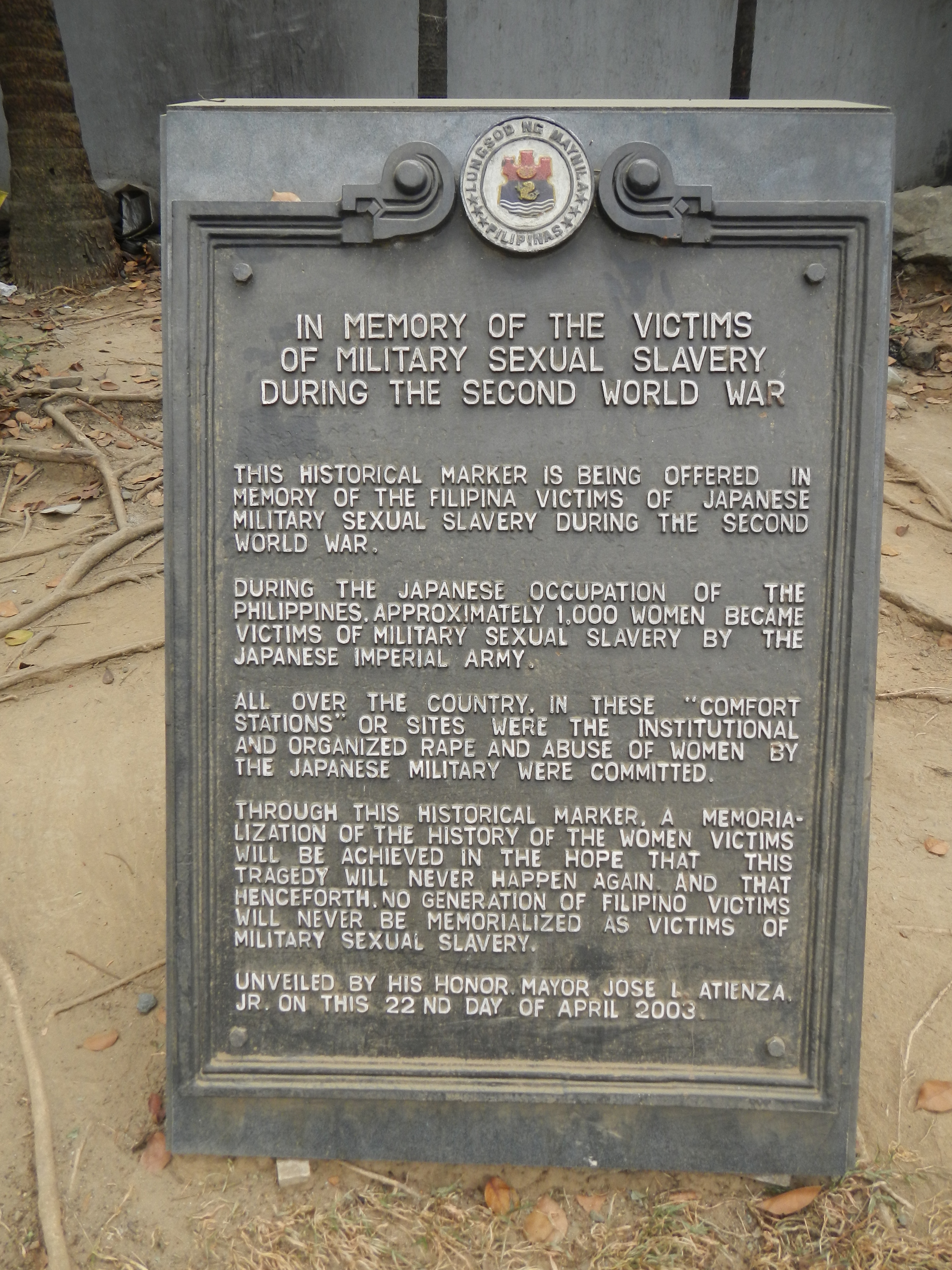
Historical Marker, Plaza Lawton, Liwasang Bonifacio, Manila

Initially the Japanese government denied legal responsibility, however they later responded to growing pressure and continued protests by the survivors and their supporters, and established the Asian Women's Fund (AWF) in 1995 to collect money from private Japanese citizens in order to create "atonement payments." Henson died of a heart attack in August 1997, a year after she decided to accept 320 million yen ($26,667) monetary reparations from the AWF.

== See also ==
- Timeline of Philippine history
- Walterina Markova, a man who served as a "comfort gay" during the war
