= Markova: Comfort Gay =

- The original film poster, released in 2000.
- Directed by: Gil M. Portes
- Screenplay by: Clodualdo del Mundo Jr.
- Produced by: Rodolfo V. Quizon; Dolor Guevarra; Rene Pascual
- Starring: Dolphy; Eric Quizon; Jeffrey Quizon; Loren Legarda
- Cinematography: Johnny Araojo
- Edited by: George Jarlego
- Music by: Joy Marfil
- Production company: RVQ Productions
- Distributed by: Vagrant Films
- Release date: December 25, 2000
- Running time: 97 minutes
- Country: Philippines
- Languages: Filipino; English; Japanese
- Box office: ₱190,000,000.00

Markova: Comfort Gay is a 2000 Filipino biographical coming-of-age drama film based loosely on the life of Walter Dempster Jr., the last surviving Filipino "comfort gay" (male sex slaves for Imperial Japanese Army) from World War II. Written by Clodualdo Del Mundo Jr. and directed by Gil M. Portes, the film tells the story of her hardships during her childhood and her travail during the Second World War. The character was portrayed by actor Dolphy, who played the adult Markova while two of his sons, Eric Quizon and Jeffrey Quizon, took on the role of the younger Markova in two earlier phases of her life.

The film was released theatrically on December 25, 2000, as one of the official entries for the 26th Metro Manila Film Festival, winning Best Supporting Actor in the film festival and the 24th Gawad Urian Awards for Jeffrey Quizon. Aside from local acclaim, it also received international acclaim with the recognition of Prix de la Meilleure Interpretation to the father-and-sons Dolphy, Eric Quizon, and Jeffrey "Epy" Quizon at the 2001 Brussels International Film Festival.

== Plot ==
Walterina Markova is a devout Catholic and elderly drag queen who lives at the Home for the Golden Gays and trains Japan-bound entertainers for a living. After watching a report by Loren Legarda on comfort women during World War II, Markova suffers an emotional breakdown and nightmares about her wartime experience. After praying in church, Markova resolves to tell her story and persuades the home's founder, Councilor Justo Justo, to arrange for an interview with Loren. The latter, who initially assumes that she would be interviewing another comfort woman, is shocked when Markova reveals herself to be the "comfort gay" she is looking for, but agrees nevertheless to hear out her story, which she records on tape.

Born Walter Dempster Jr., Markova discovers her sexual identity as a teenager in the 1930s. While she is accepted by her mother and sisters and tolerated by her father, her homophobic elder brother Bobby frequently beats her up and arranges for one of his male friends to rape her. Bobby later dies, having developed tuberculosis from an alcohol-induced ulcer, to Markova's relief.

During the Japanese occupation in 1942, middle-aged Markova and her friends Carmen, Sophie, Anita, and Minerva work as cross-dressing dancers at a nightclub and catch the attention of Japanese officers who mistake them for women. The officers take their group to the Manila Hotel for a tryst, but upon finding that they are cisgender men, they are arrested and sent to a barracks, where they are repeatedly raped by Japanese soldiers, earning them the moniker "comfort gays", until they escape during an Allied bombing raid. The experience leaves a deep scar on Markova, which leads her to avoid mentioning the incident for years until she decides to let herself be interviewed by Loren. Sophie embarks on a killing spree of Japanese soldiers in revenge for her rape, which ends with her being captured and dying under torture in Fort Santiago. The group disperses during the Battle of Manila, and Minerva is never heard from again.

After the country's liberation, Markova reunites with Anita and resumes working as a dancer. While cavorting with an American sailor, Markova comes across a psychologically scarred Carmen and helps her re-embrace her sexual identity. Markova eventually stops cross-dressing and works as a makeup artist for celebrity actors. In her elderly years, Markova attends to a dying Anita, who reveals that she had caught AIDS. Frightened, Markova undergoes a blood test and is relieved after she tests negative. She also visits Carmen, who is dying from a heart ailment, and brings her favorite food. Markova later grieves at failing to find their graves on a visit to the cemetery.

In the present day, Markova ends her testimony, but Loren expresses doubts over her story as part of her journalistic training. Offended, Markova takes Loren's tape recording of the interview and offers it back once she believes her story, prompting Loren to storm off. Alone in her room, Markova laments at having her story disbelieved despite all her struggles in her lifetime, before cross-dressing again for a dance with her younger selves while reminiscing about her glory days.

== Cast ==
=== Lead cast ===
- Dolphy as Walter Dempster Jr./Walterina Markova (senior years)
  - Eric Quizon as Walterina Markova (during his middle years)
  - Epi Quizon as the young Walter Dempster Jr.
- Ricci Chan as Anita
- Melvin Lee as Carmen
- R.S. Francisco as Minerva
- Andoy Ranay as Sophie
- Loren Legarda as herself
- Joel Lamangan as Councilor Justo Justo
- Dexter Doria as Mrs. Dempster, Markova's mother
- Freddie Quizon as Robert "Bobby" Dempster
- Chandro Concepcion as Roco
- Gio Alvarez as the young gay assistant in the Home for the Golden Gays
- Nanding Josef as Walter Dempster Sr.

=== Minor roles ===
- Greg Guerra as older Anita
- Luciano "Chaning" Carlos as older Carmen
- Andrew E. as Chiquito/"Tintoy"
- Jennifer Urbano as Francesca "Frances" Dempster
- Ana Rosales as Arabella Dempster
- Chandro Concepcion as Roco
- Theresa Beron as Guia
- Daisy Reyes as Eva Reyes/Rosing
- Bembol Roco as Puging
- Bearwin Meily as Tuging
- Karla Estrada as Markova's Japan-bound talent
- Ronnie Quizon as a Japanese soldier flutist

== Digital restoration ==
The film was digitally restored and remastered in 4K high definition by the ABS-CBN Film Restoration Project through the facilities of Central Digital Lab. Since the 35mm master negative print was well-preserved at the ABS-CBN Film Archives, the restoration team of Central Digital Lab took 260 hours to fix the images from instability and eliminate film grain, flicker, and optical dirt. The restoration of the film was completed in 2019, a year before the shutdown of ABS-CBN and its controversial franchise denial in 2020. The 4K restored version of the film was premiered digitally on November 20, 2020, as part of the digital exhibition for the Pista ng Pelikulang Pilipino 2020.

== Adaptations ==
The musical Gee-gee at Waterina Ang Musikal is loosely based on the film, focusing on what happened behind the scenes of the movie and featuring fictionalized versions of Markova and Justo Justo figuring out what to do with the money they received for the film rights.

== Awards and recognitions ==
=== Official selections ===
- 2002 Seattle Lesbian and Gay Film Festival
- 2002 San Francisco International Lesbian and Gay Film Festival
- 2001 Brussels International Film Festival

=== 2001 Brussels International Film Festival ===
- Won Prix de la Meilleure Interpretation, Dolphy, Eric Quizon, and Jeffrey Quizon

=== 2001 FAMAS Awards ===
- Won Best Supporting Actor, Jeffrey Quizon
- Won Best Production Design, Kay Abano
- Nominated Best Actor, Dolphy
- Nominated Best sound, Albert Michael Idioma and Rudy Gonzales

=== 2001 Gawad Urian Awards ===
- Won Best Supporting actor, Jeffrey Quizon
- Nominated Best Actor, Dolphy
- Nominated Best Music, Joy Marfil
- Nominated Best Production Design, Kay Abano

=== 2001 Young Critics Circle ===
- Nominated Best Achievement in Cinematography and Visual Design, Johnny Araojo and Kay Abano
- Nominated Best Performance by Male or Female, Adult or Child, Individual or Ensemble in Leading or Supporting Role, Dolphy

=== 2000 Metro Manila Film Festival ===
- Won Best Supporting Actor, Jeffrey Quizon
