= Walterina Markova =

Gay Filipino sex slave (1924–2005)

Walter Dempster Jr.
- Born: 20 May 1924; Philippine Islands
- Died: 24 June 2005 (aged 81); Pasay, Philippines
- Other name: Walterina Markova

Walter Dempster Jr. (20 May 1924 – 24 June 2005), better known by his alias Walterina Markova, was a Filipino gay man who was forced as a "comfort gay" (sex slave) for Imperial Japanese Army soldiers during the Japanese occupation of the Philippines in World War II.

== Biography ==
After Markova left home, he joined a group of six cross-dressing performers. It was as part of this group that he was arrested by Japanese soldiers and taken to a camp, which is now the Rizal Memorial Sports Complex. For several years, he and his companions, and other "comfort gays", were put to forced labor and abused sexually by Japanese soldiers, as the "comfort women" were abused.

His story was made into a film called Markova: Comfort Gay in 2000, directed by Gil Portes. It was included in the 2002 Seattle Lesbian and Gay Film Festival and the San Francisco International Lesbian and Gay Film Festival.

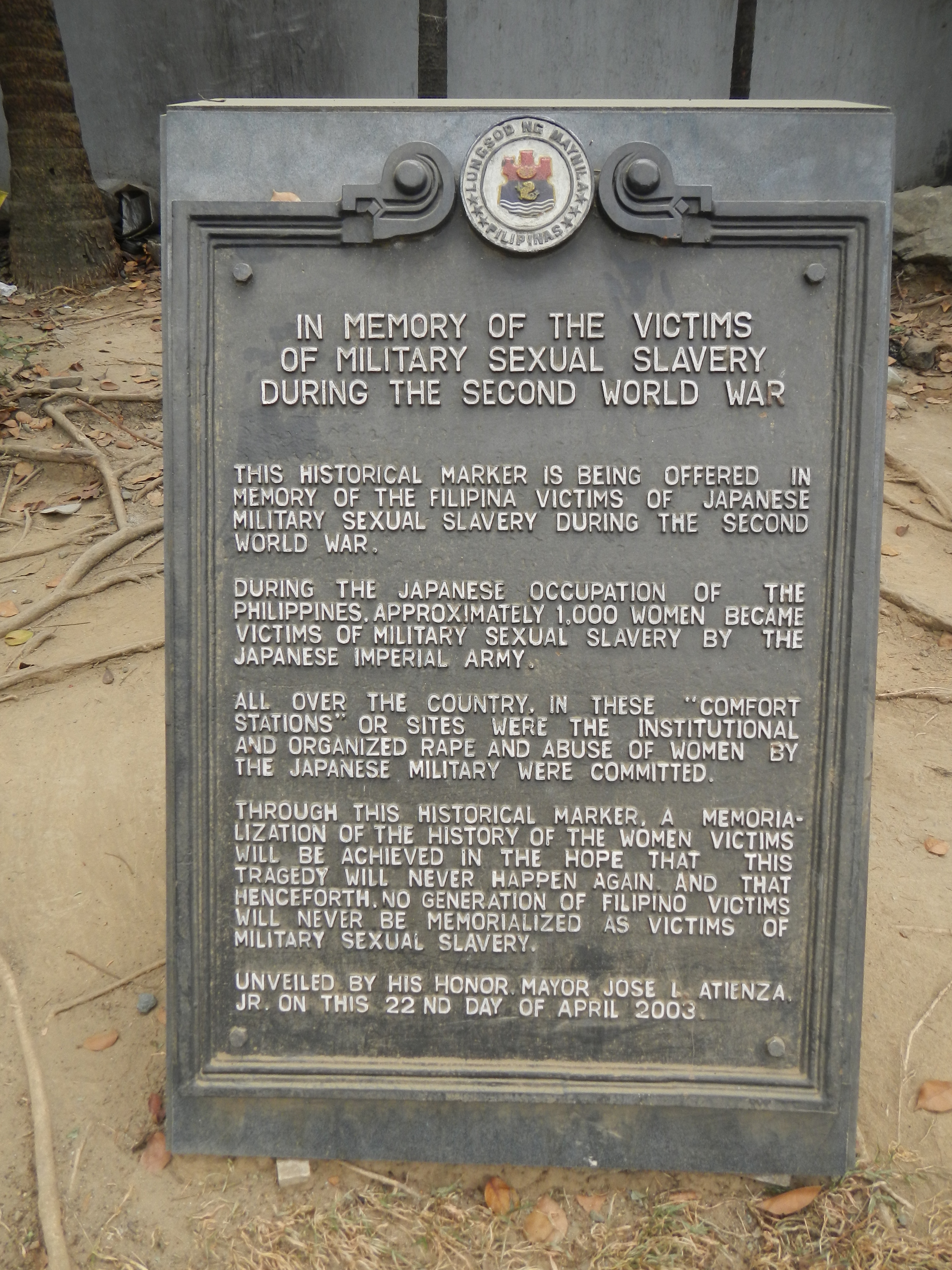
Historical marker, Plaza Lawton, Liwasang Bonifacio, Manila

== Personal life ==
Dempster spent his final years at the Home for the Golden Gays in Pasay. He died at the age of 81 when he was hit by a cyclist.

== See also ==
- Rosa Henson
- Justo Justo
- Home for the Golden Gays
