= Bakla =

Filipino word for effeminate individuals assigned male at birth

Baklâ
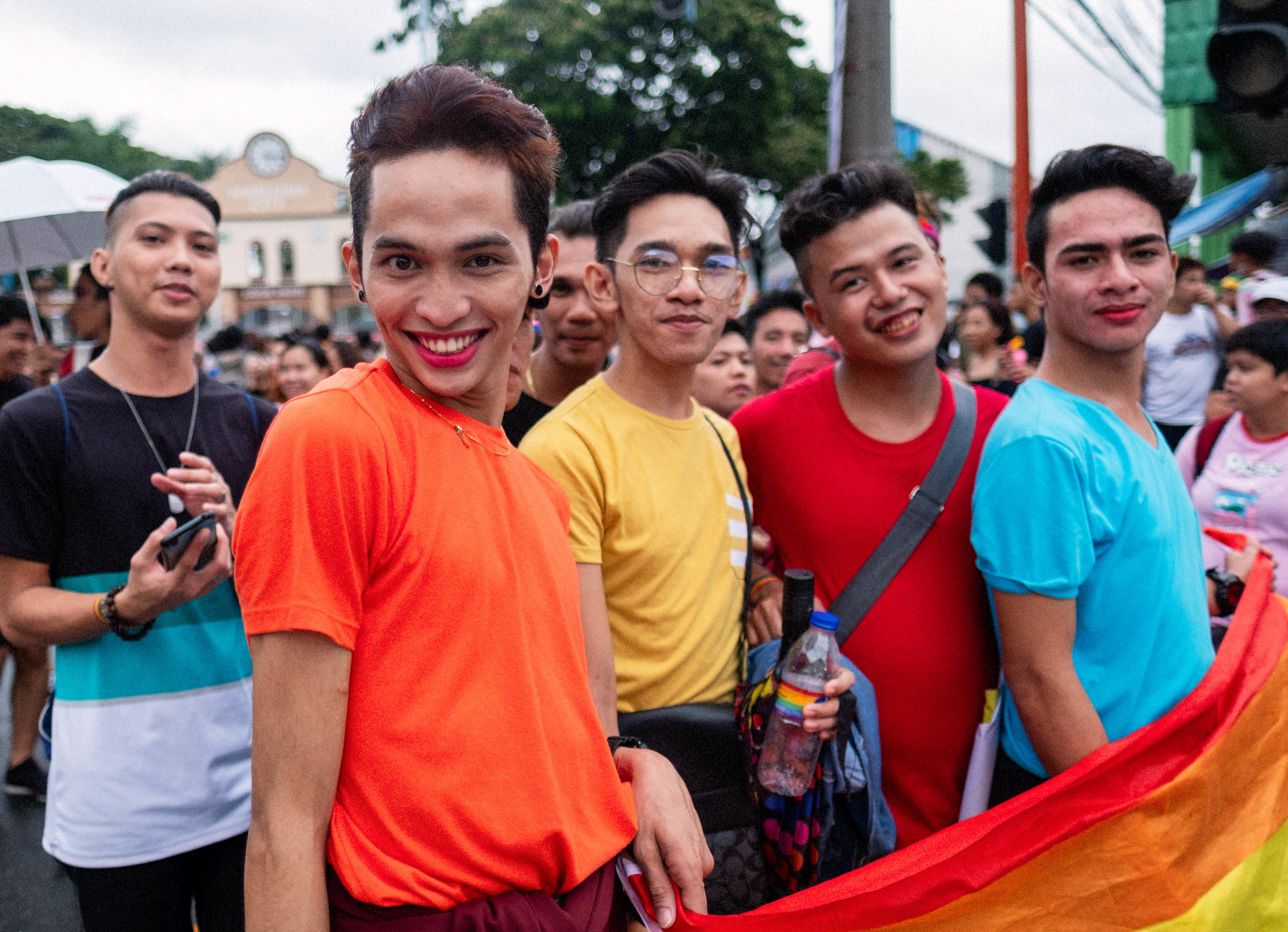
- Philippine LGBTQ+ protesters during Pride March in June 2019
- Pronunciation: [bɐkˈlaʔ]
- Meaning: Gender non-conforming male, effeminate gay man, third gender
- Definition: Queer AMAB
- Classification: Umbrella term

Other terms
- Synonyms: Bayot, agi, bayogin

Demographics
- Culture: Filipino
Regions with significant populations
- Philippines

In the Philippines, a baklâ (Tagalog and Central Bikol, pronounced [bɐkˈlaʔ]), badíng (Tagalog and Central Bikol), bayot (Cebuano), or agî (Hiligaynon) is a person who was assigned male at birth and has adopted a gender expression that is feminine. They are often considered as a third gender. Many bakla are exclusively attracted to men and some identify as women. The term is commonly incorrectly applied to trans women. The polar opposite of the term in Philippine culture is tomboy (natively, the lakin-on or binalaki), which refers to women with a masculine gender expression (usually, but not always, lesbian).

Bakla are socially and economically integrated into Filipino society, having been accepted by society prior to Western colonization, many of which were held in high regard and had the role of spiritual leaders known as babaylan, katalonan, and other shamans in the indigenous Philippine folk religions. In modern times, a minority of Filipinos oppose or reject non-binary sexual identities, usually based on Christian and Islamic beliefs predominant in the country. The stereotype of a "baklâ" is a parlorista—a flamboyant, camp cross-dresser who works in a beauty parlor; in reality, the bakla participates in numerous sectors of society.

== Etymology ==
In modern Filipino, the term "baklâ" is usually used to mean either "effeminate man" or "homosexual". Martin F. Manalansan, a Filipino anthropologist, has identified two possible origins of the term. One is that it may have been a portmanteau of the words babae ("woman"), and lalaki, meaning ("man"). The other is that it is derived from the word for the pre-colonial shamaness in most Filipino ethnic groups, the babaylan.

However, the word itself has been used for centuries, albeit in different contexts. In Old Tagalog, bacla meant "uncertainty" or "indecisiveness". Effeminate homosexual men were instead called binabaé ("like a woman") or bayogin (also spelled bayugin or bayoguin, "infertile"), during the Spanish colonial period.

The Tagalog poet Francisco Balagtas used the word bacla in reference to "a temporary lack of resolve", as seen in his popular works Florante at Laura and Orosman at Zafira. This archaic usage is also seen in the 17th-century Tagalog religious epic Casaysayan nang Pasiong Mahal ni Jesucristong Panginoon Natin na Sucat Ipag-alab nang Puso nang Sinomang Babasa ("Story of the Passion of Jesus Christ Our Lord that Surely Shall Ignite the Heart of Whosoever Readeth"), which is chanted during Holy Week. The passage narrating the Agony in the Garden has a verse that reads "Si Cristo'y nabacla" ("Christ was confused").

By the advent of World War II, the term baklâ had evolved to mean "fearful" or "weakened" in Tagalog, and became a derogatory term for effeminate men. A common euphemism for baklâ during this period was pusong babae (literally "female-hearted"). It was not until the 1990s when more positive discourse on queer and gay identities became more mainstream that baklâ lost its original derogatory connotation.

Other native terms for bakla also exist in other languages of the Philippines, some of them now considered archaic. They are also called bayot, binabáye, bayen-on (or babayen-on), or dalopapa in Cebuano; agî in Hiligaynon/Ilonggo; dampog or bayot in Waray; bantut or binabae in Tausug; bantut or dnda-dnda in Sinama; and labia in Subanen.

In addition, there are numerous modern neologisms for bakla, especially within swardspeak, with varying levels of acceptance. These include terms like badáf, badíng, beki, judíng, shokì, shoklâ, sward, and vaklúsh, among many others.

== Definition ==
Although a study by De La Salle University determined that baklâ is the most appropriate translation for "male homosexual", the term is not tied to sexuality and is not a sexual orientation, thus it is not a direct equivalent of the English term "gay". Baklâ is a gender identity characterized by the adoption of a feminine gender expression by men. This includes feminine mannerisms and speech, use of make-up, cross-dressing, and long hairstyles; all are referred to with the umbrella term kabaklaán (effeminacy). Baklâ are usually homosexual men, but on rare occasions, they can also be heterosexual or bisexual men.

As the term baklâ specifically denotes effeminacy, it is traditionally not applied to masculine gay men. However, due to increasing globalization and influence from the Western categories of sexual orientation, baklâ has become incorrectly equated with the gay identity and used generally for homosexual men, regardless of the individual's masculinity or femininity in presentation.

Baklâ are often considered the natural "third gender" in Filipino culture. This is illustrated in the children's rhyme that begins by listing four distinct genders: "girl, boy, baklâ, tomboy." Like in English, the term tomboy (archaic lakin-on or binalaki) refers to masculine (usually lesbian) women, and is broadly understood as the polar opposite of the baklâ.

Baklâ is also commonly used for trans women, though this is incorrect and discouraged. This is largely due to the absence of modern local terms for transgender people, as well as the general public ignorance of the differences between homosexuality and transsexuality. Some organizations have pushed for the adoption of new terminology that distinguishes transgender people from the baklâ, to prevent the common derogatory misconception that trans women and trans men are simply baklâ and tomboy that have undergone sex reassignment surgery. One such proposal in 2008 by the Society of Transsexual Women of the Philippines (STRAP) is transpinay (for trans women) and transpinoy (for trans men), both derived from the Filipino endonym "pinoy". But it has yet to gain widespread acceptance.

The difficulty of correlating definitions with western terminology is because of the fundamental difference in the cultural views on homosexuality. According to Filipino academic J. Neil Garcia, the baklâ would fall under the inversion pattern of homosexuality identified by American psychobiologist James D. Weinrich. This is the cultural view where homosexuality is seen as an inversion of the gender and sex binary. In Philippine context, this would be the binary of the loób (the inner self or spirit, lit. "inside") and labás (the physical form, lit. "outside"). Thus, it is similar to the South Asian hijra and the Native American two-spirit. This is contrasted to the other two patterns of homosexuality worldwide, namely, age-biased patterns (like pederasty in Ancient Greece) and role-playing patterns (like in certain Middle Eastern and Latin American cultures).

== History ==
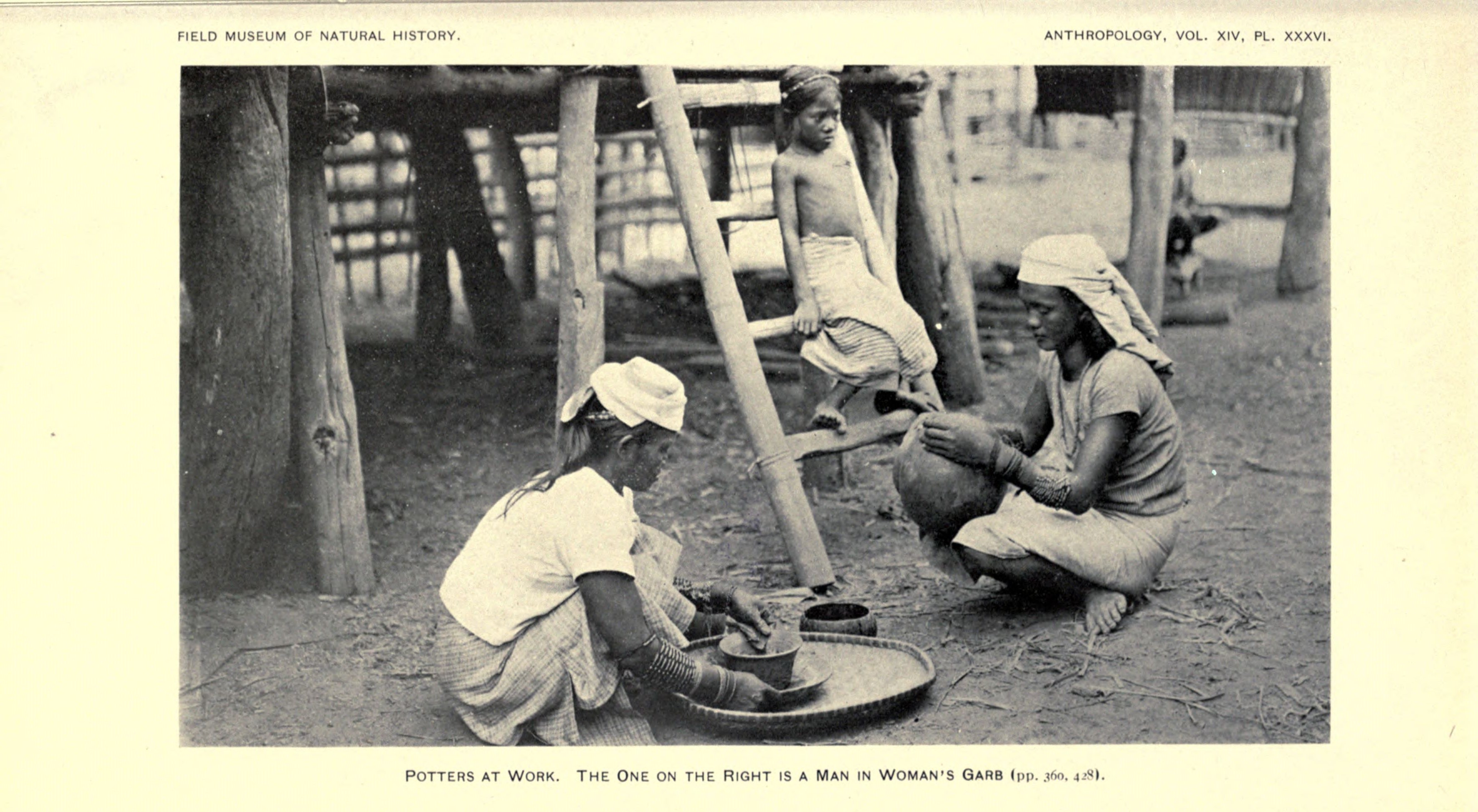
Itneg potters; the one on the right is a bayok in female attire (c. 1922)

Homosexual relations practised by both sexes were common and bore no stigma in pre-colonial Philippines. There are numerous accounts of feminized men in early Spanish records, with such individuals described as wearing female clothing, working in traditionally female roles, and being treated as women by the community. They were considered as comparable to cisgender women aside from their incapability for childbearing. Some were even recorded as being married to men, with others married to women, though this did not preclude homosexual relationships. Generally, these effeminate men were known as bayog (also bayok or bayogin; spelled bayoc or bayoquin in Spanish) in Luzon, and asog in the Visayas islands, both connoting "infertility" or "impotence".

Among the heavily-tattooed Visayans, asog were also exempted from compulsory male tattooing customs (batok). It was normally considered shameful and unattractive for adult men to have no tattoos, which were indicators of achievements and bravery. It was otherwise socially acceptable for asog to be mapuraw or puraw ("unmarked [skin]", compare with Samoan pulaʻu), if they choose to be so.

Due to their association with the feminine, they were regarded as having greater powers of intercession with the anito (ancestral and nature spirits) and thus commonly became shamans (babaylan), a traditionally female role in Philippine cultures. This is not unique to the Philippines and was also common in pre-colonial societies in the rest of Island Southeast Asia; like the bissu of the Bugis people, the warok of the Javanese people, and the manang bali of the Iban people.

Shamans were highly respected members of the community as ritual specialists: healing the sick, keeping oral histories, performing sorcery, and serving as spirit mediums for communicating with ancestral and nature spirits. They were below only to the nobility in the social hierarchy, and could function as a community's interim leader (similar to a regent or interrex) in the absence of the datu.

In Historia de las islas e indios de Bisayas (1668), the Spanish historian and missionary Francisco Ignacio Alcina records that the asog became shamans by virtue of being themselves. Unlike female shamans, they neither needed to be chosen nor did they undergo initiation rites. However, not all asog trained to become shamans. Castano (1895) states that the Bicolano would hold a thanksgiving ritual called atang that was "presided" by an "effeminate" priest called an asog. His female counterpart, called a baliana, assisted him and led women in singing the soraki in honor of Gugurang, the supreme deity of Bikol mythology. Regardless, the majority of shamans in most Philippine precolonial cultures were female.

During the three centuries of Spanish colonization (1565–1898), the Catholic Church introduced harsh measures to suppress both female and asog shamans. In realms and polities absorbed by the Spanish Empire, shamans were in general maligned, falsely branded witches and "priests of the devil", and persecuted violently by the Spanish clergy. The previously high status of the babaylan in the Philippines was thus lost. The role of women and the relative gender egalitarianism of Philippine animistic cultures, in general, became more subdued under the patriarchal culture of the Spanish.

The most strongly affected by this religious shift to Abrahamic religions were the feminized male asog shamans. During the 17th to 18th centuries, Spanish administrators in the Philippines burned at the stake those convicted of homosexual relations, and confiscated their possessions in compliance with a decree by the president of the Real Audiencia, Pedro Hurtado Desquibel. Several instances of such punishments were recorded by the Spanish priest Juan Francisco de San Antonio in his Chronicas de la Apostólica Provincia de San Gregorio (1738–1744).

Asog shamans were leaders of several revolts against Spanish rule from the 17th century to the 18th century. Notable ones include the Tamblot uprising of Bohol in 1621–1622 and the Tapar rebellion in Panay in 1663. Later rebellions in the 19th and 20th centuries were also led by male shamans. However, these later shamans (collectively known as the dios-dios, "god pretenders") followed syncretic Folk Catholic systems instead of pre-colonial anito shamanism. Though they still dressed as women in rituals, they were married to women and unlikely to be homosexual.

Feminized men were also persecuted harshly in the (then recently) Islamized ethnic groups in Mindanao. In Historia de las Islas de Mindanao, Iolo, y sus adyacentes (1667), the Spanish priest Francisco Combés records that their "unnatural crime" was punished by Muslim peoples in Mindanao with death by burning or drowning, and that their houses and property were also burned as they believed that it was contagious.

This was followed by American colonization (1898–1946), which though secular, introduced the idea that homosexuality and effeminacy were a "sickness". Despite this, the colonization of the Philippines did not fully erase traditional equivocal views of Filipinos of queer and liminal sexual and gender identities. Though there are still problem areas, Filipino culture as a whole remains relatively accepting of non-heteronormative identities like the baklâ.

== Culture ==
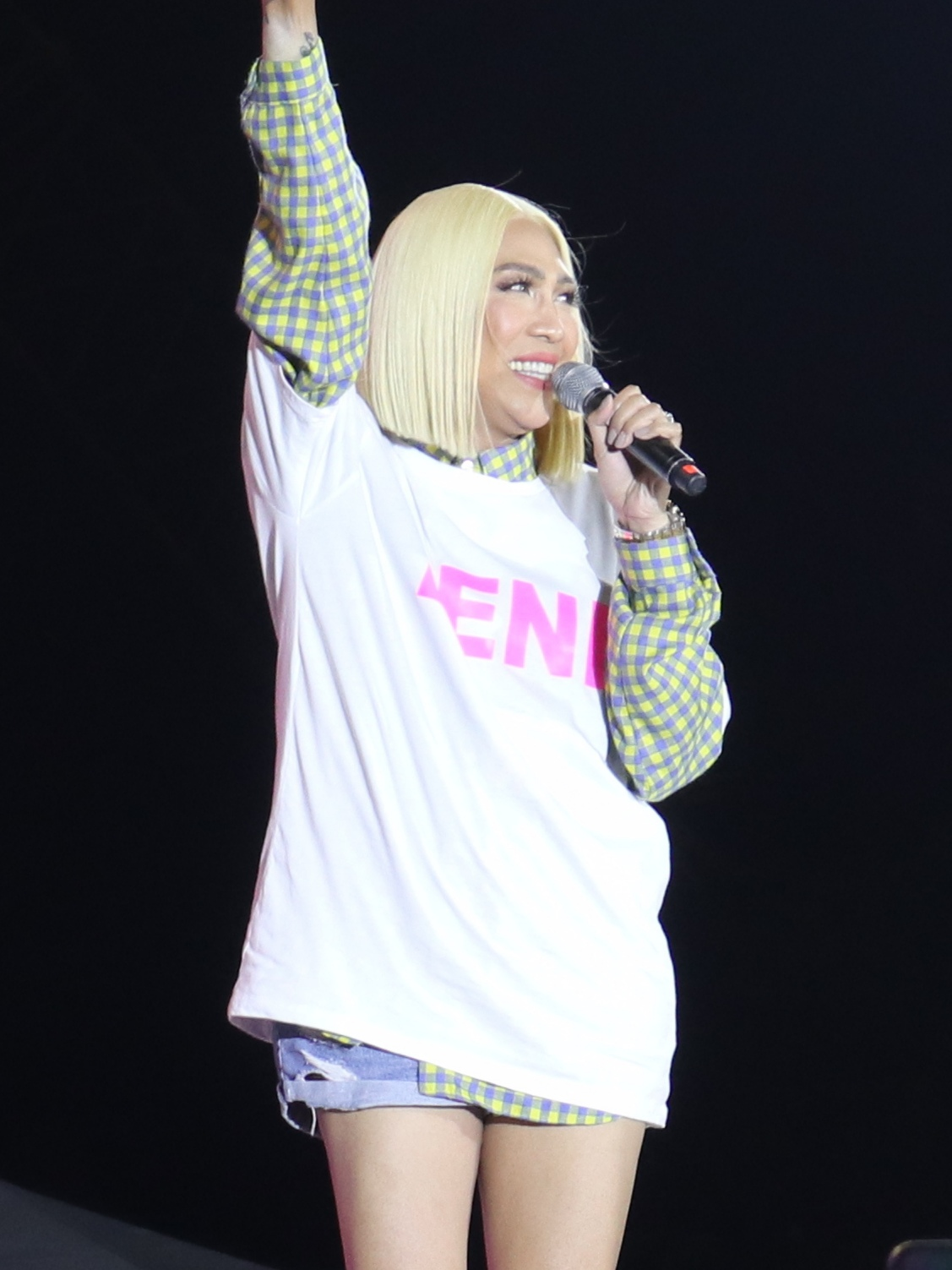
Vice Ganda, a popular Filipino comedian, actor, and television personality, self-identifies as a baklâ.

=== Beauty pageants ===
Baklâ communities are renowned for staging beauty pageants, with Miss Gay Philippines being national in scope. Participants model swimsuits, national costumes, dresses, and showcase their talents, as with female beauty pageants worldwide.

=== Swardspeak ===
Baklâs have an argot or secret language, called swardspeak. It is used by both masculine and feminine baklâs and incorporates elements from Filipino, Philippine English and Spanish, spoken with a hyper-feminised inflection. It was widespread and popular until the 1990s, but is now considered unfashionable in most parts of Manila. Modern versions of swardspeak are generally called "beki language", "gay lingo", or "gayspeak". They commonly make their way into mainstream Filipino culture. One early example is the song "Bongga Ka, 'Day" (1979), the biggest hit song of the Filipino Manila Sound band Hotdog. The title of the song means "You're fabulous, Dear" and uses the swardspeak slang bongga ("fabulous").

=== Babaeng bakla ===
Heterosexual women who develop deep friendships or almost exclusively associate with the local LGBT subculture are known as babaeng baklâ (literally, "a woman who is a bakla"). They stereotypically acquire the mannerisms, campy humour, speech patterns, and fashion sense of baklâ peers. They are also usually more extroverted and socially dominant. Similar to some Western women accepting their status as gay icons, this is commonly seen as a positive self-identification, with various female celebrities like Maricel Soriano and Rufa Mae Quinto openly identifying as babaeng baklâ.

== Legal status ==
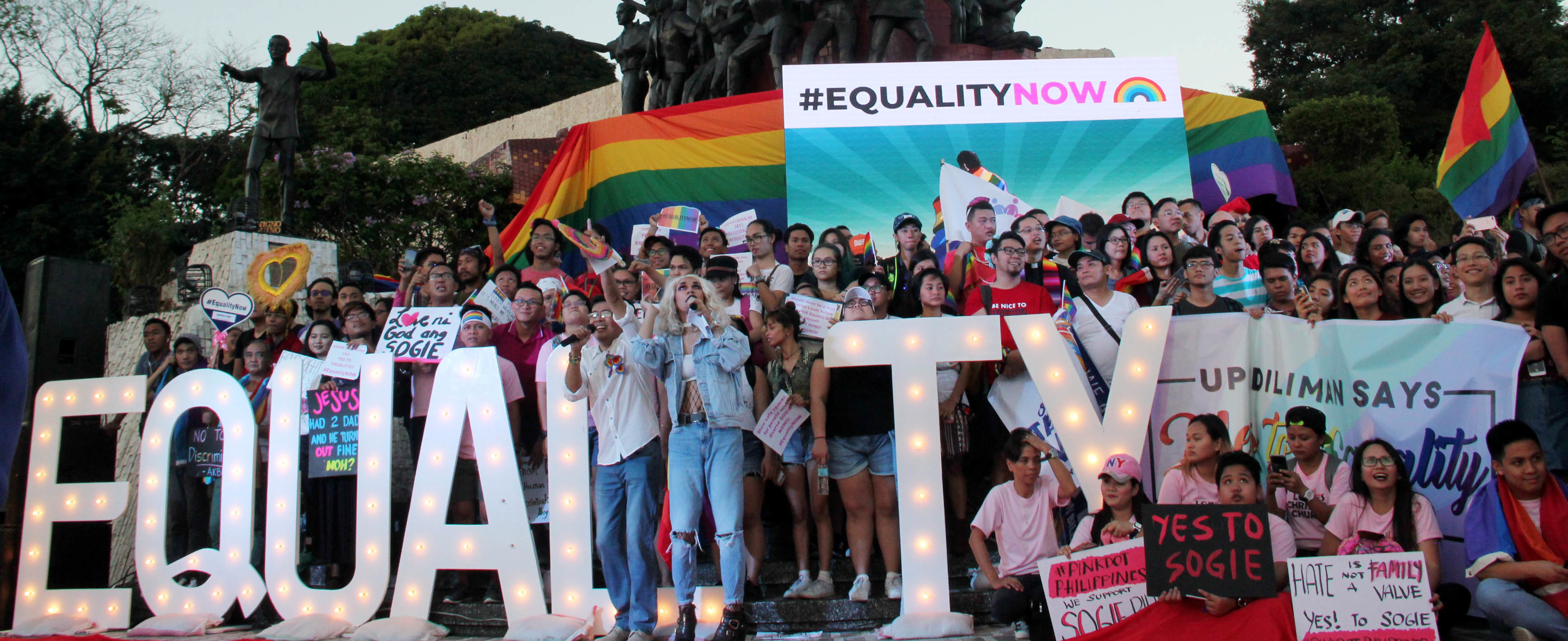
2018 rally to support the passage of the Sexual Orientation and Gender Identity and Expression (SOGIE) equality bill

Since independence, noncommercial, homosexual relations between two adults in private settings have never been criminalized in the Philippines, although sexual conduct or affection that occurs in public may be subject to the "grave scandal" prohibition in Article 200 of the Revised Penal Code (which encompasses a much wider subset of activities by any individual).

In December 2004, it was reported the predominantly Muslim Marawi had issued an ordinance banning baklâ from publicly wearing female attire, makeup, earrings "or other ornaments to express their inclinations for femininity". The ordinance passed by the Marawi City Council also bans skintight blue jeans, tube tops and other skimpy attire. Additionally, women (only) must not "induce impure thoughts or lustful desires." The then-Mayor said these moves were part of a "cleaning and cleansing" drive; it was enforced as Marawi was part of the Autonomous Region in Muslim Mindanao (now the devolved Bangsamoro), which permits legislation based on Sharīʿah and separate from the rest of the country, as long as these laws do not violate the 1987 Constitution.

Same-sex marriage or partnerships are not recognised in the Philippines, preventing many homosexual men from getting married. Attempts to legalise same-sex marriage in the Philippines has been presented to Congress, but none has passed thus far give pushback from conservatives.

== Religion ==
The Philippines is predominantly Christian, with over 80% of Filipinos belonging to the Roman Catholic Church. Church doctrine officially tolerates persons with such orientations, but condemns homosexual activity as "intrinsically disordered." This condemnation of homosexuality presents a problem for baklâ because of potential discrimination in a Catholic-dominated society. As a result, baklâ youth in particular are at a higher risk for suicide, depression and substance abuse than their heterosexual peers, with risk increasing as parental acceptance decreases.

While a significant minority, baklâ adherents of Protestantism face varying degrees of acceptance based on the attitudes of their denomination. The Philippine Independent Church, which is in full communion with the worldwide Anglican Communion, officially does not endorse homosexuality. Various Evangelical churches and the Iglesia ni Cristo are more fundamentalist in doctrine, and thus strongly condemn homosexual acts and actively suppress such identities among adherente.

Non-Christian Filipinos who profess Islam, Buddhism, Hinduism and other faiths also present a wide variety of doctrinal views. Islam, the second largest religion in the Philippines, comprises roughly 5.57% of the population. Islam shares views with other Abrahamic Faiths in that homosexual acts are held to be sinful. According to the Delhi High Court, Hinduism does not officially condemn homosexuality. As for Buddhism, the Dalai Lama XIV (the most influential figure of the Gelug school of Tibetan Buddhism) has stated homosexuality to be "sexual misconduct" for believers but does not condemn it for non-believers.

== See also ==
- Ladlad
- LGBT in the Philippines
- LGBT rights in the Philippines
- Culture of the Philippines
- Home for the Golden Gays
- Babaylan
- Drag Race Philippines
- Māhū – equivalent of bakla in Hawaii.
- Fa'afafine – equivalent of bakla ('binabae') in Samoa.
- Takatāpui – equivalent of bakla among the Māori.
- Kathoey – equivalent of bakla in Thailand.
- Sexuality in the Philippines
