= Home for the Golden Gays =

Filipino non-profit organization

- Formation: 1975
- Founder: Justo Justo
- Type: Non-profit organization
- Location: Pasay
- Leader: Ramon Busa

The Home for the Golden Gays (HGG), or simply The Golden Gays, is a Philippine non-profit organization that provides support and care facilities for elderly LGBTQ people. It was originally established in 1975 by Justo Justo (September 21, 1941 – May 18, 2012), a Filipino columnist, Pasay City councilor, and LGBTQ activist. Currently, there are around 40 active members of the organization, mostly aged 60 and above. They are colloquially known as "the lolas" (lola is Filipino for "grandmother").

Justo's house originally served as the main facility of the Home for the Golden Gays. However, the organization's members were evicted by the family of Justo a day after his death in 2012. Members with no families are currently temporarily housed in a small lodge paid for by one of their members in Pasay, while the rest have returned to surviving relatives. They are still trying to raise funds for a permanent new facility. They hold drag shows and community outreach programs at least once a month which generate funding from corporate and private donors to cover groceries and healthcare expenses for the members. Some members also work odd jobs, like as vendors or street cleaners, to provide for the group.

A notable member of the organization was Walterina Markova (May 20, 1924 – June 24, 2005), a surviving "comfort gay" sex slave for Imperial Japanese Army soldiers during the Japanese occupation of the Philippines in World War II. His life was adapted into the movie Markova: Comfort Gay in 2000.

== See also ==
- Bakla
- Ladlad
- LGBT rights in the Philippines
- Swardspeak
