= Justo Justo =

Filipino columnist and activist

The Honorable Panfilo C. Justo

Member of the Pasay City Council
- In office June 30, 1995 – June 30, 2001
- Constituency: 1st district
- In office June 30, 1992 – June 30, 1995
- Constituency: At-large

Personal details
- Born: Panfilo Cagoco Justo; September 21, 1941 Pasay, Rizal, Philippine Commonwealth
- Died: May 18, 2012 (aged 70) Manila, Philippines
- Party: Liberal (2001–2012)
- Other political affiliations: LAMMP (1998–2001); Independent (1992–1998)
- Spouse: Adela Justo
- Children: Ma. Louela Justo-Galvez; Ma. Milagros Justo-Miyazawa
- Profession: Columnist, playwright, politician

Panfilo Cagoco Justo (September 21, 1941 – May 18, 2012), widely known as Justo Justo, or simply JJ, was a Filipino columnist and Pasay city councilor. He was known as a flamboyant AIDS activist.

== Early life ==
Justo came from a poor family in the sitio of Manlumay, Leyte. He was born to Francisco Justo Sr. and Ma. Lourdes Milagros Cagoco on September 21, 1941. JJ sold local delicacies to support his elementary education. As a consistent honor student he graduated as valedictorian of the Barangay Palarao Elementary School. His father wanted him to become a lawyer, but after his early death JJ had to take care of his younger brother Francisco Jr. (Frank) and sister Edith.

== Career ==
JJ enrolled at the Rizal Central Colleges in Pasay to pursue his high school education. They left Leyte when he was in third year at the Calubian High School.

JJ sold roasted corn and lugaw to support his studies. He finished high school as Most Outstanding Graduate.

JJ's boyhood hobbies included sketching men's and ladies apparel, writing both poetry and prose, including Visayan lyrics for popular American songs. His stepfather Cecilio Pamintuan, novelist and movie writer, gave JJ his first training in journalism. He was later encouraged and helped in his writing by novelists Rico Bello Omagap, Orlando Nadres and Pablo Gomez.

In 1968 he joined the staff of the former newspaper Philippine Sun, which allowed him to develop his controversial writing style. He was the first to be published using swardspeak.

JJ founded Pasay Aids Watch and Information Drive (PAWID), and used his own foundation JJ Barangayan (Phils.) Foundation, Inc. to fight against the spread of AIDS.

Justo used to host a television program titled Etchos Lang, and gained attention for the cause when he convinced AIDS victim Sarah Jane Salazar to share her story to the public.

He also played a leading part in the establishment of the "Home for the Golden Gays", a retirement home for homosexuals such as Walter Dempster.

== Political life ==
JJ was among the first media celebrities to make the transition to public office. He started his career in the political arena as a Kagawad and later became a barangay chairman in 1987. He became a councilor of Pasay in 1992, and completed three terms.

== Personal life ==
He married Adela, by whom he had two daughters, Maria Louela Justo-Galvez and Maria Milagros Justo-Miyazawa.

== Death ==
Justo died on May 18, 2012, at the Philippine General Hospital. He had been bedridden for a year with spinal column problems due to diabetes.

His remains were interred at Golden Haven Memorial in Las Piñas.

== Filmography ==
=== Actor ===
Title	Year	Role
Pearly Shells	1972	
The Secrets of Sarah Jane: Sana'y Mapatawad Mo	1994	himself

=== Writing & crew ===
Title	Year	Role
I Love You Honey	1970	story
Bad Girl	1971	story
Si Waray At Ang Talyada	1971	story
Avenida Boy	1971	story and screenplay
Batul of Mactan	1974	story
Angelita...Ang Inyong Ina	1979	publicity coordinator
The Secrets of Sarah Jane: Sana'y Mapatawad Mo	1994	story
Ang Pulubi At Ang Prinsesa	1997	(thanks)

== See also ==
- Home for the Golden Gays
- Walterina Markova
