= 2016 and 2018 Philippine Olympic Committee elections =

- Date: November 25, 2016 and February 23, 2018
- Venue: Wack Wack Golf and Country Club
- Location: Mandaluyong, Metro Manila, Philippines
- Type: Elections
- Cause: Expiry of then-President Jose Cojuangco's third term (2016 elections); Pasig Regional Trial Court decision partially declaring the results of the 2016 elections null and void (2018 elections)
- Organised by: Commission on Elections of the Philippine Olympic Committee led by Francisco Elizalde
- Outcome: Then-President Jose Cojuangco's secures a fourth term. (2016 elections); Ricky Vargas elected President; Abraham Tolentino elected chairman (2018 elections)

In November 2016, the Philippine Olympic Committee (POC) held an election which saw Jose "Peping" Cojuangco win a fourth term as president after Victorico "Ricky" Vargas was disqualified for not being an "active member" of the committee. Tolentino, a candidate for the chairman position was also disqualified on the same grounds.

The camp of Vargas said that being an active member does not equate to physical attendance which the POC led by then incumbent President Cojuangco insists. This led to Vargas to seek a temporary restraining order to stop the 2016 elections and rule on the POC's commission on election's authority to define the eligibility criteria of being an active member.

The court denied postponing the 2016 elections but it ruled in December 2017 that the commission on elections of the POC cannot qualify or restrict the criteria of being an active member, ruled that the results of the 2016 elections for the post of President and Chairman null and void, and ordered the POC to hold elections on February 23, 2018 with Vargas and Tolentino as candidates.

Cojuangco's camp has raised concerns on infringement on the POC's autonomy by the government and possible suspension of the POC by the International Olympic Committee leading to the 2018 elections. An extraordinary general assembly was held on February 19, 2018 to decide whether the elections should take place and discuss the active member eligibility. They affirmed the definition of the eligibility criteria that led to Vargas and Tolentino's disqualification in 2016 but the two were allowed to participate in the 2018 elections.

Vargas and Tolentino were then elected as president as Chairman respectively.

== 2016 elections ==
Philippine Olympic Committee general election, 2016
- November 25, 2016
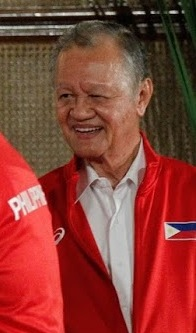
Candidate	Jose Cojuangco Jr.
Popular vote	26 / 37
Percentage	70.3%
President before election
Jose Cojuangco Jr.
Elected President
Jose Cojuangco Jr.

=== Background ===
==== Candidacy of Vargas and Tolentino ====
Ricky Vargas made an attempt to run for President of the Philippine Olympic Committee in 2016 challenging incumbent, Peping Cojuangco. His camp includes Abraham Tolentino of Cycling running for chairman, Albee Benitez (Badminton) for First Vice President, Lucas Managuelod (Muay Thai) for Second Vice President, Sonny Barrios (Basketball) for Treasurer, and Ting Ledesma (Table Tennis) for Auditor.

Mariano Araneta of the Philippine Football Federation also planned to run for President of the POC but withdrew to support Vargas' candidacy.

==== Disqualification of Vargas and Tolentino ====
The candidacy of Vargas and Tolentino were not accepted by the POC's commission on elections which is headed by Francisco Elizalde. Elizalde reasoned that the two did not satisfy article 7 section 11 of the POC charter which stated that a candidate must have attended 50 percent plus one of the total number of General Assemblies the past two years.

Ricky Vargas criticized his disqualification through his spokesperson Chito Salud. The Vargas camp alleged that the disqualification decision was made "without any objection or opposition from a known third party", "hastily rendered" without a basic requisite hearing held and there was no written resolution issued in regards to the justification to disqualify him.

According to Elizalde, Vargas is an inactive member for attending just one general assembly meeting within the past two years. Vargas insist that being an active member is "more than attendance" and that "Physical presence at the general assembly does not equate to active participation". Then incumbent president, Peping Cojuangco insists there is nothing political about the rules on elections set by the POC in 2008 are just being followed. Vargas then filed a petition for temporary restraining order (TRO) before the Pasig Regional Trial Court to stop the scheduled November 25 elections to allow for dialogue.

The Senate's committee on sports held a hearing on November 22 regarding alleged unliquidated funds given to the sports body by the government and the contentious disqualification of Vargas. The POC made an unsuccessful request to have the hearing cancelled. Its lawyers attended the oral hearings since the POC stated that President Peping Cojuangco had to attend to a hearing regarding the TRO petition filed by Vargas' camp. However Cojuangco did not attend the TRO hearing. The Philippine Sports Committee also attempted to hold a mediation meeting but Cojuangco or his allies did not attend to the meeting.

The Pasig RTC denied Vargas' camp to have the elections stopped but hearings regarding the "active member" criteria which led to Vargas' disqualification was scheduled to take place in December 2016.

==== Disqualification of Tom Carrasco ====
Tom Carrasco, the then-incumbent chairman vied for a reelection although he was later disqualified due to not being an incumbent member of a president of a member NSA at that time anymore. He was previously president of the Triathlon Association of the Philippines.

=== Elections and results ===
The elections was held at the Wack Wack Golf and Country Club in Mandaluyong on November 25, 2016 during the POC's general assembly. 37 voting members were present with six members including disqualified Ricky Vargas absent from the meeting. Incumbent President Jose Cojuangco Jr., and an aspiring auditor, Jonne Go ran unopposed.

There were no candidates for the position of chairman due to previous incumbent chairman, Tom Carrasco ruled ineligible for reelection and the rejection of the candidacy of Abraham Tolentino.

Candidate/s		Contested Position	Votes for	Incumbent before elections	
Name	NSA	Contested Position	Votes for	Name	NSA
Jose Cojuangco Jr.	Equestrian	President	26 / 37	Jose Cojuangco Jr.	Equestrian
None	—N/a	Chairman	—N/a	Tom Carrasco	Triathlon
Joey Romasanta	Karate	First Vice President	23 / 37	Joey Romasanta	Karate
Albee Benitez	Badminton	First Vice President	11 / 37	Joey Romasanta	Karate
Jeff Tamayo	Soft Tennis	Second Vice President	25 / 37	Jeff Tamayo	Soft Tennis
Lucas Managuelod	Muay Thai	Second Vice President	11 / 37	Jeff Tamayo	Soft Tennis
Julian Camacho	Wushu	Treasurer	24 / 37	Julian Camacho	Wushu
Sonny Barrios	Basketball	Treasurer	12 / 37	Julian Camacho	Wushu
Jonne Go	Canoe and Kayak	Auditor	31 / 37	Prospero Pichay	Chess
Jesus Clint Aranas	Archery	Board Member	30 / 37	Cynthia Carrion	Gymnastics
Cynthia Carrion	Gymnastics	Board Member	30 / 37	David Carter	Judo
Robert Mananquil	Cue sports	Board Member	28 / 37	Ernesto Echauz	Sailing
Prospero Pichay	Chess	Board Member	27 / 37	Jonne Go	Canoe and Kayak

== 2018 elections ==
Philippine Olympic Committee general election, 2018
- February 23, 2018
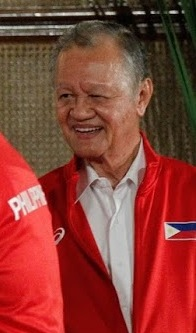

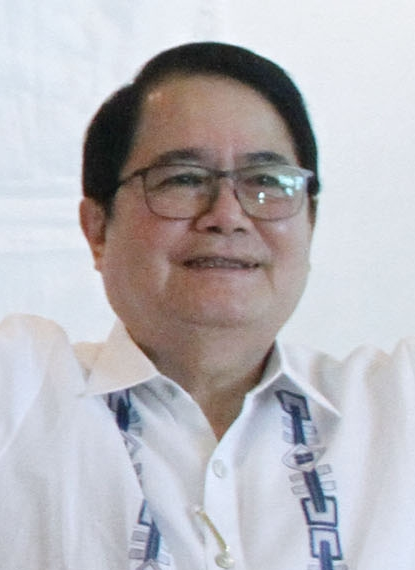
Candidate	Jose Cojuangco Jr.	Victorico Vargas
Running mate	Ting Ledesma	Abraham Tolentino
Popular vote	15 / 40	24 / 40
Percentage	37.5%	60%
President before election
Jose Cojuangco Jr.
Elected President
Victorico Vargas

=== Background ===
==== Pasig RTC ruling ====
Branch 155 of the Regional Trial Court of Pasig ruled that the results of the 2016 elections for the post of President and Chairman of the Philippine Olympic Committee as null and void. The decision penned on December 1, 2017 by Judge Maria Gracia A. Cadiz-Casaclang stated that the "POC Election Committee acted beyond the scope of its power and authority granted to it by the POC Executive Board, and had violated its own POC Election rule" when the election body motu proprio disqualified Ricky Vargas and Abraham Tolentino as candidates of the 2016 elections. It added that the election committee cannot restrict or qualify the criteria of being an "active member" of the POC as equating to "physical presence in the meetings of the General Assembly". The court ordered the POC to hold elections for the post of President and Chairman with Vargas and Tolentino as candidates. The Vargas camp hailed the decision.

==== POC Court of Appeals TRO petition ====
The POC filed a temporary restraining order against the Pasig court's ruling but the Court of Appeals ruled against giving a TRO. During the January 31, 2018 meeting of the General Assembly, Ricky Vargas' camp was unsuccessful in starting a discussion regarding the February elections ordered by the Pasig court after Peping Cojuangco adjourned the meeting. POC spokesperson Prospero Pichay stated that such discussion is premature since reasoning that sports body has yet to receive the Court of Appeals ruling denying the POC a TRO. Ed Picson executive director of Vargas' NSA, Amateur Boxing Association of the Philippines disputes the claim. Vargas' camp has accused Cojuangco of delaying the February elections.

==== February 2018 pre-election events ====
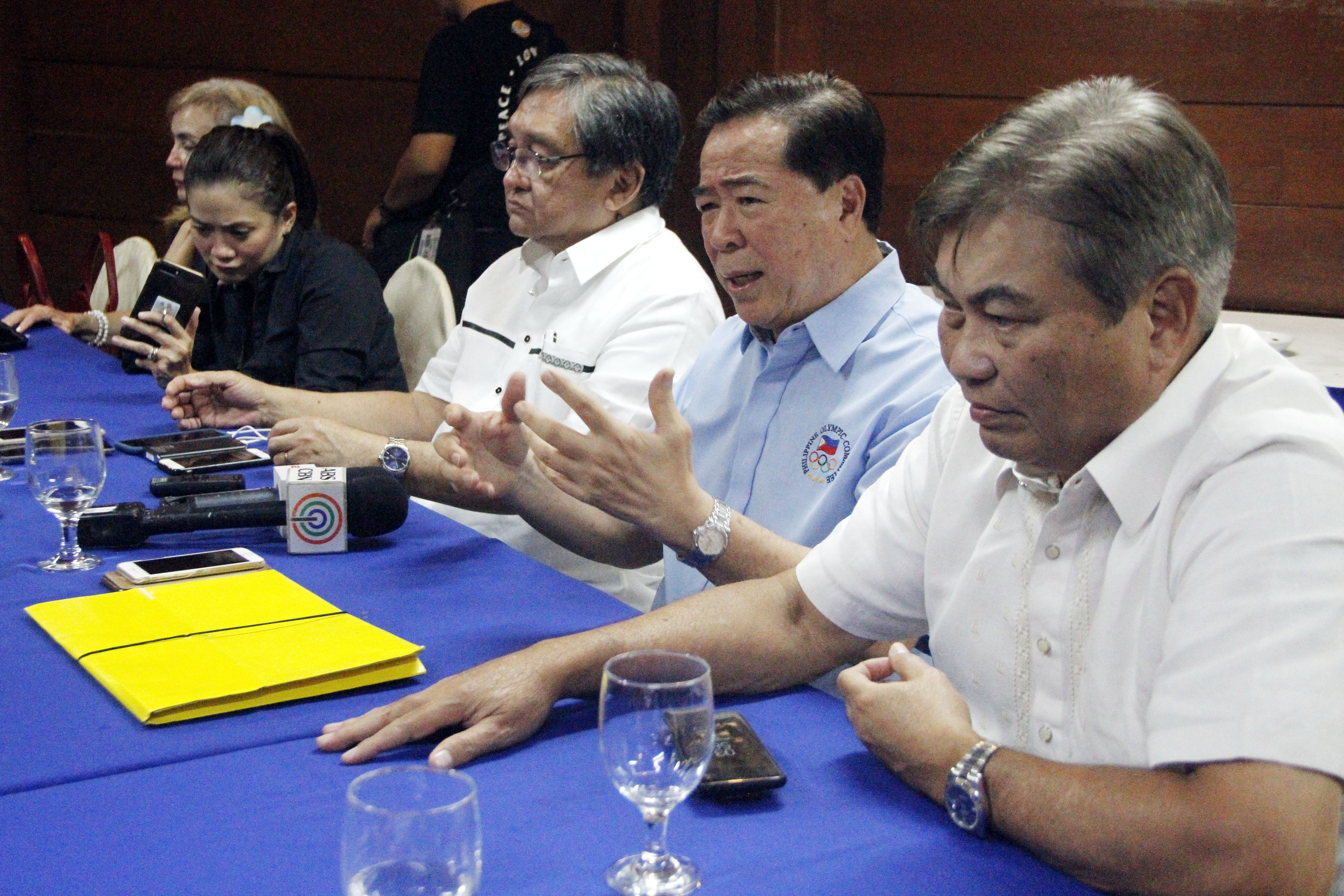
NSA heads including Weightlifting NSA President Monico Puentevella (second from right) and Mariano Araneta (far right) expressed Ricky Vargas candidacy for the 2018 POC elections in a press conference in Pasig.

The POC notified the International Olympic Committee (IOC) through a February 8 memorandum that it plans to hold elections on February 23, 2018. Pere Miro, IOC deputy director general, expressed in a February 9 letter that fact the POC's internal dispute was referred to an "ordinary court" as "unfortunate". He said that internal disputes in a National Olympic Committee, such as the POC, must have been resolved by its competent governing bodies including its General Assembly. Though he insists that the letter is not meant as an interference by the IOC of the judicial courts of the Philippine government.

It also informed the international Olympic body that it plans to hold an Extraordinary General Assembly on February 19 where it plans to discuss Miro's letter, elections eligibility criteria, and other matters. POC spokesperson, Prospery Pichay latter clarified on February 14 that the notice was a matter of "matter of compliance" to avoid the POC to be cited for contempt and the planned extraordinary meeting will discuss whether to hold the election or not noting that Miro's letter did not direct for the holding of an election.

The POC through Pichay said that the national sports body is concerned of a possible suspension by the IOC and said that the IOC's letter of resolving internal disputes by the General Assembly rather than external courts is the POC's "guiding principle" for its extraordinary general assembly.

Vargas' camp has claimed the support of 27 NSAs and said that they will fight for Vargas and Tolentino's eligibility in the general assembly.

===== 2018 February POC Extraordinary General Assembly =====
The extraordinary meeting held as scheduled at the Wack Wack Golf and Country Club. Ramon Fernandez, Charles Maxey, Arnold Agustin and Celia Kiram of the Philippine Sports Commission sought entry but was denied. The POC through Pichay reasoned that the move was to protect the body's "integrity and autonomy". The four PSC officials interpreted that they should have been part of the meeting saying that Miro's letter called for dialogue between "all interested parties". Due to technical reasons, officials of the weightlifting and shooting national sports associations were also barred from attending the meeting.

Pichay said that the General Assembly agreed to hold elections on February 23 and insists the move was not due to the Pasig court order. The assembly upheld the definition of the eligibility criteria of being an "active member" which led to the disqualification of Vargas and Tolentino in the 2016 elections. Pichay said it is clear that being an active member in the POC means physical attendance and that refers to the person rather than their NSA. An election committee has been formed which was headed by Francisco Elizalde, who led the commission on elections that disqualified Vargas in 2016.

Vargas and Tolentino speculated that they will be disqualified from the February 2018 elections though they said they will attend the elections. However they were allowed to run for the elections this time. The Elizalde-led commissions on election made the decision to allow the candidacy to two with the Pasig court order partially nullifying the 2016 elections in consideration. Elizalde maintained that he personally still consider the two as ineligible but has stated that he doesn't want to be cited contempt of court.

Then incumbent President Peping Cojuangco expressed disappointment of the move. He said that to allow an election to adhere to a court order is tantamount to government intervention. Cojuangco said he will inform the IOC regarding the development.

=== Elections and results ===
Elections took place at the Wack Wack Golf and Country Club in Mandaluyong on February 23, 2018. The positions of President and Chairman was contested. Ricky Vargas was elected president after he won over incumbent Peping Cojuangco with 24 votes going to the former, and 15 voters for the latter. One vote was an abstention. Abraham Tolentino secured a 23–15 win over Ting Ledesma.

Aside from the presidents of POC's member NSAs, athletes representatives track and field athlete Henry Dagmil and weightlifter Hidilyn Diaz, as well the Philippine permanent representative to the IOC and Peping Cojuangco's daughter, Imee Cojuangco-Jaworski, was among those who voted in the polls. There were a total of 43 voting members present but only 40 voted in the elections. Albee Benitez, head of the badminton NSA arrived late and was not able to vote. Due to technicalities, Shooting holdover president Richard Fernandez and weightlifting chief Monico Puentevella were barred from voting.

According to journalist Al Mendoza, Joey Romasanta abstained from voting for a president but managed to get Pete Cayco (acting volleyball president), Jonne Go (canoe-kayak) and Jeff Tamayo (soft tennis) to vote for Vargas.

Candidate/s		Contested Position	Votes for	Incumbent before elections	
Name	NSA	Contested Position	Votes for	Name	NSA
Jose Cojuangco Jr.	Equestrian	President	15 / 40	Jose Cojuangco Jr.	Equestrian
Victorico Vargas	Boxing	President	24 / 40	Jose Cojuangco Jr.	Equestrian
Ting Ledesma	Table Tennis	Chairman	15 / 40	Vacant	—N/a
Abraham Tolentino	Cycling	Chairman	23 / 40	Vacant	—N/a

== Aftermath ==
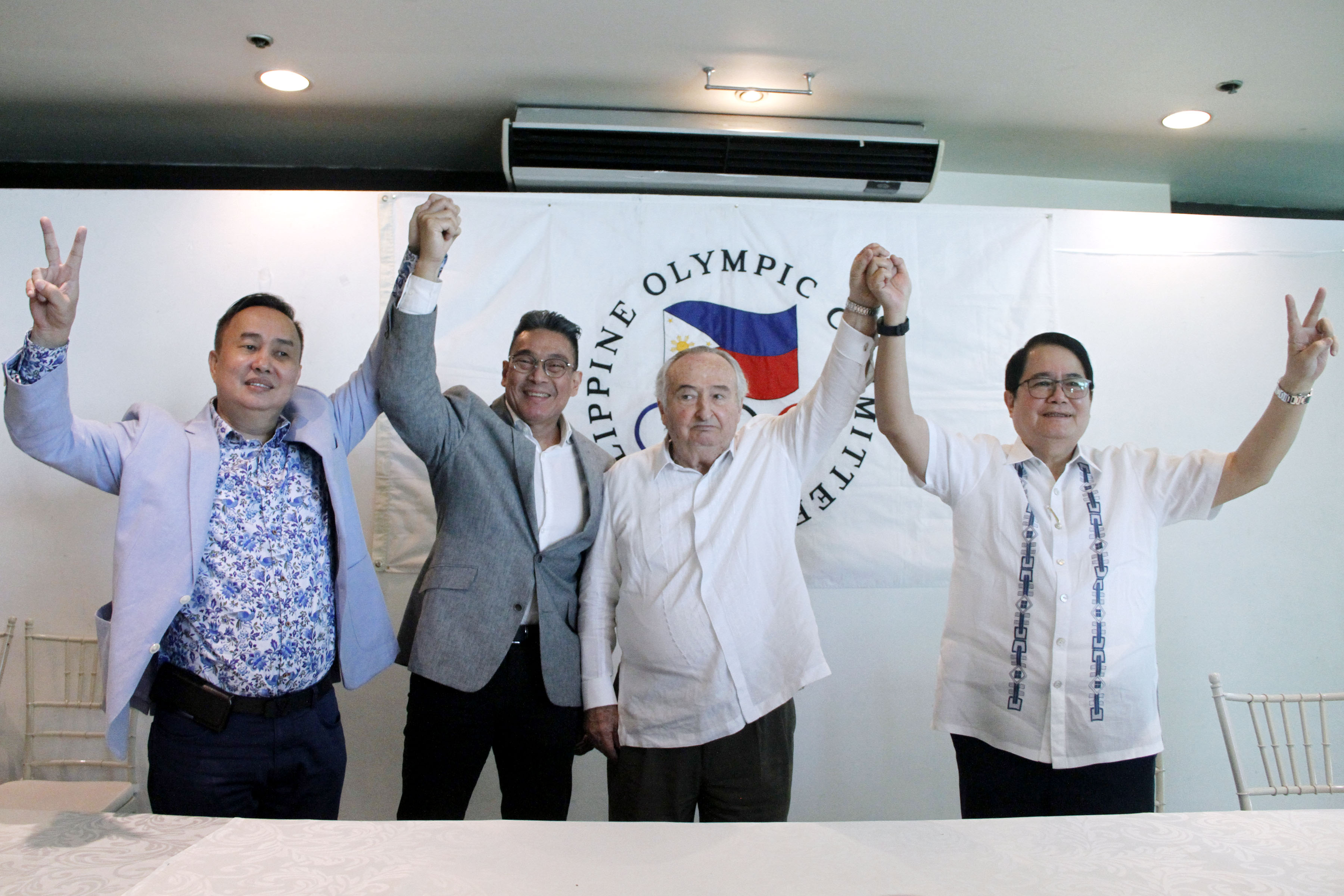
Winners of the 2018 POC elections being proclaimed.

=== Reactions ===
Following the conclusion of the 2018 elections, Vargas, who claims to be inexperienced in elections and politics, was elated and Cojuangco left the venue telling the media that he would be calling for a meeting.

Peping Cojuangco then conceded defeat the following day saying that the "majority has spoken". and said he wants to know what his future role in the POC would be.

He also said that since the beginning he would like to be certain on "how far the courts can go" and expressed belief that the interpretation of the POC's bylaws and interpretation shouldn't be made by one person though he mentions he could have possibly allow the Supreme Court to get involved. Cojuangco also said that he was obliged to protect the POC's autonomy and protect it from religious, monetary and political pressures. He also raised concerns on how the POC deals with a hypothetical scenario where a government court orders the replacement of a particular athlete in a Philippine delegation for an international competition in lieu of an athlete the court declares as undeserving. Despite the end of his presidency, Cojuangco has vowed to remain an "active member" of the national olympic committee.

POC Commission on Elections head, Francisco Elizalde revealed that he allowed Vargas and Tolentino to run in the 2018 elections after consulting with IOC officials in South Korea during the Winter Olympics and added that the IOC "was very much aware of the situation in the Philippines". He said while the IOC regretted the situation, it allowed the POC to go ahead with the election and that the international body didn't object to the manner the elections took place. However he expressed pessimism that a "healing" will take place in Philippine sports noting "not friendly relations among a lot of people" in the POC.

The petition filed by Cojuangco camp to disallow Vargas and Tolentino's candidacy for the February 2018 election was dismissed by the 10th Division of the Court of Appeals on July 10, 2018. It declared the petition as "moot and academic" since the petitioners decided to hold the election and recognize Vargas and Tolentino as winners of the said election.

=== Transition ===
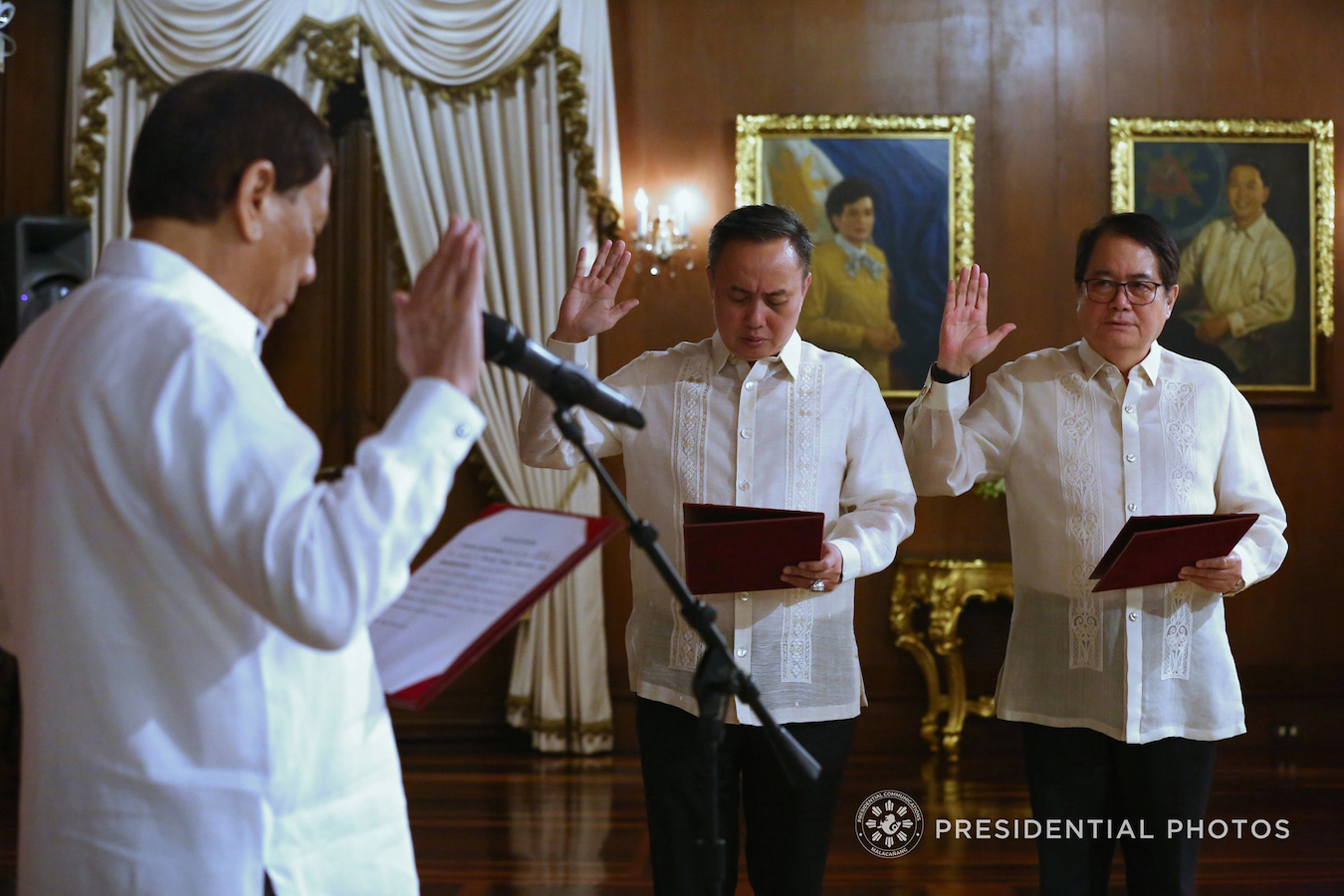
Philippine President Rodrigo Duterte administers the oath taking of Tolentino and Vargas as POC officials. March 5, 2018.

Shortly after Vargas' election as POC President, a transition team consisting of Karen Tanchanco, football general secretary Edwin Gastanes and basketball legal counsel Edgardo Francisco was formed to "ensure a smooth transition of the POC’s files, records and properties".

Vargas decided to retain Julian Camacho as chef de mission of the Philippine delegation to the 2018 Asian Games. Monsour del Rosario, Jonnee Go, and Joey Romasanta remains chef de mission of the 2019 Southeast Asian Games, 2010 Youth Summer Olympics, and 2020 Summer Olympics respectively. Camacho later resigned from his post.

Businessman and sports patron Manny Pangilinan has provided ₱20 million as seed money to the POC. Cecilio Pedro of Hanabishi and Lamoiyan, and Alfrancis Chua sports head of San Miguel Corporation has also pledged support. Vargas said that they will form a "NSA-type" committee to deal with the issue regarding the POC's alleged unliquidated funds provided by the Philippine Sports Commission for its NSAs.

To cool-off hostilities Vargas has expressed writing off debts of the NSA as a possible option.

Vargas and Tolentino were sworn in before Philippine President Rodrigo Duterte in a simple ceremony at Malacañang Palace on 5 March 2018 which marked the official start of their terms.
