= Go Teng Kok =

- Born: July 30, 1944
- Died: December 18, 2024 (aged 80); Quezon City, Philippines
- Other names: GTK
- Occupations: Businessman, sports executive
- Known for: President of the Philippine Athletics Track and Field Association (1990–2014)

Go Teng Kok was a Filipino sports executive and businessman who was president of the Philippine Athletics Track and Field Association (PATAFA) from 1990 to 2014. He was also known for being involved in internal disputes in various national sports associations outside track and field.

== Early life ==
Go Teng Kok was born on July 30, 1944 to an affluent family who are now based in Cebu. He is the eldest of six children of Chinese emigrant Go Sung Yap. The elder Go, decided to move from Fukien (now Fujian) to settle in Manila due to the Chinese Communist Revolution. Go Sung Yap founded the family business, Goyu and Sons. The conglomerate is involved in various business from producing wooden doors to distributing automobiles.

== Career ==
=== Basketball ventures ===
Go was the team manager of the Philippines men's national basketball team which finished as silver medallists at the 1990 Asian Games in Beijing.

Go has also organized a basketball team carrying the name of his family's business, Goyu and Sons. In 1990, Go also owns the Burger City team which played in the Philippine Basketball League.

=== PATAFA presidency ===
Go who was a mentor of Jose Sering, became president of the Philippine Amateur Track and Field Association (PATAFA) in 1990 succeeding Sering.

Under Go, the Philippine national athletics team's performance at the SEA Games was noted. The Philippines was third overall top performing nation in athletics at the 2003 SEA Games in Vietnam and was the second overall best nation in the 2005 SEA Games hosted in the Philippines. Elma Muros, an eleven-time gold medalist was among the athletes who competed under Go's PATAFA from 1991 to 2001.

The Philippines also hosted the 1993 and 2003 Asian Athletics Championships under Go's watch.

In July 2013, Go was hospitalized. Philip Ella Juico has been representing Go in his stead while he recovers and Go has considered retiring by December of that year. In July 2014, Juico was elected as Go's successor ending the official's 24-year stint as PATAFA president.

=== Philippine Olympic Committee ===
Go expressed interest to run for the position of president of the Philippine Olympic Committee (POC) in 1996.

Go was part of Celso Dayrit's faction which removed Cristina Jalasco as POC president in 1999. However Go had a falling out with Dayrit.

Peping Cojuangco's ascendancy to the POC presidency in 2004 reportedly involved Go. Go then became Cojuangco's special assistant before relationship deteriorated as early as 2007.

In 2012, Go's candidacy for POC president was blocked.

=== Involvement in NSA disputes ===
==== Philippine Table Tennis Federation ====
Go resigned as Cojuangco's special assistant in January 2007 after a squabble with Monico Puentevella and Salvador Andrada in December 2006 and was accused of plotting for the removal of table tennis president Victor Valbuena from his position

==== Wushu Federation of the Philippines ====
However, he remained to be Cojuangco's special assistant at least around 2009, when POC spokesperson Joey Romasanta dispelled rumors about Go's alleged resignation over his involvement with the internal disputes within the Wushu Federation of the Philippines. Go reportedly supported Alvin Tai Lian in the dispute while Cojuangco backed the faction of Julian Camacho and Tan Shi Ling.

==== Philippine Karatedo Federation ====
Go in his capacity as Philippine Karatedo Federation (PKF) president got involved in a leadership dispute with Romasanta. The POC under Cojuangco supported Romasanta's faction and ordered an election where Enrico Vasquez was elected as new PKF president. Go sought the intervention the court to prevent POC from recognizing Vasquez's leadership which led to the Cojuangco administration to declare Go as "persona non grata" in June 2011.

== Assassination attempt ==
On July 1, 2003, two motorcycle-riding gunmen attempted to kill Go, who was enroute to the PATAFA office at the Rizal Memorial Sports Complex. He sustained wounds on his cheeks but survived the assassination attempt.

== Links to Yu Yuk Lai ==
Go was linked to convicted drug traffickers Yu Yuk Lai and her nephew William Sy. The mother-nephew were arrested in a hotel in Manila in November 1998 as a result of a buy bust operation. Along with Court of Appeals Justice Demetrio Demetria, Go was alleged by state prosecutor Pablo Formaran III of pressuring him to slow down the case involving Yu in July 2001.

Former BAP president Freddie Jalasco used Go's connections with Yu Yuk Lai as a basis for an POC Ethics Commission investigation. Sering described the case filed by Jalasco in late 2001 as "harassment and a matter of politics" and Go's actions concerning Yu is only part of his duties as a friend. Yu is also Go's brother-in-law.

== Personal life ==
Go was married to a woman named Betty, with whom he had three children.

== Death ==
Go died on December 18, 2024, while confined at the National Kidney and Transplant Institute in Quezon City. His remains were cremated and stored at the Thousand Buddha Temple in the same city.
