= Pilipinas Basketball =

Pilipinas Basketball (Filipino: Pilipinas Basketbol, PB) was the basketball governing body recognized by the Philippine Olympic Committee (POC) from March 2006 to February 2007. It was formed to replace the POC-backed Philippine Basketball Federation, Inc. (PBFI), which itself was formed to replace the FIBA-recognized Basketball Association of the Philippines (BAP) as the sport's governing body.

The BAP was expelled from the POC in 2005 after a series of disagreements. The POC then formed the Philippine Basketball Federation in mid-2005, but failed to get FIBA recognition. The country was banned from participating in FIBA tournaments soon after. The POC tried to form a new association again in 2006, this time involving all of the country's major basketball stakeholders. This organization was simply called Pilipinas Basketball.

The structure of the association is similar, but not identical, to that of USA Basketball. It consists of four of the Philippines' major basketball stakeholders – the Philippine Basketball Association (PBA), the Philippine Basketball League (PBL), National Collegiate Athletic Association (NCAA) and the University Athletic Association of the Philippines (UAAP), as well as Joey Lina, then-president of the BAP, representing the said association.

Lina, however, backed out from the group. Pilipinas Basketball tried to gain FIBA recognition from FIBA Secretary-General Patrick Baumann but was denied, urging them to "keep the course".

Bernie Atienza, the sports coordinator of De La Salle-College of Saint Benilde and Management Committee chairman of the NCAA during the formation of Pilipinas Basketball, was named interim President. Bernie Atienza resigned thereafter from the De La Salle-College of Saint Benilde in the middle of CSB's hosting of the NCAA 82nd season and was replaced by Ateneo de Manila's Jun Capistrano.

Pilipinas Basketball was officially dissolved during the Unity Congress held on February 5, 2007. It gave way to the new basketball governing body of the Philippines, the Samahang Basketbol ng Pilipinas. It was formed after both PB and BAP signed a memorandum, known as the "Tokyo Communique" to form the said organization. After months of continuous bickering, both groups agreed to proceed with the unity congress in accordance with FIBA Secretary-General Patrick Baumann.

== Major stakeholders ==
- Philippine Basketball Association
- Philippine Basketball League
- University Athletic Association of the Philippines
- National Collegiate Athletic Association

Preceded by Philippine Basketball Federation, Inc.	Philippine Olympic Committee-recognized national association in the Philippines; 2006-2007	Succeeded by Samahang Basketbol ng Pilipinas
