= Jose Sering =

Filipino politician and sports executive (1926–2002)

2nd Governor of Surigao del Norte
- In office 1965–1980
- Preceded by: Constantino Navarro Sr.
- Succeeded by: Rolando Geotina

5th President of the Philippine Olympic Committee
- In office 1985–1992
- Preceded by: Michael Marcos Keon
- Succeeded by: Rene Cruz

Personal details
- Born: Jose C. Sering; 1925 or 1926 Surigao, Philippine Islands
- Died: February 14, 2002 (aged 76) Muntinlupa, Philippines
- Spouse: Socorro Bautista Limpot
- Children: 9

Jose Cabrera Sering was a Filipino politician and sports executive.

Sering served as Governor of Surigao del Norte from 1965 to 1980. He was one of the Founding Fathers the Asian Amateur Athletic Association in 1973 and served as its first President. He later served as the President of the Philippine Amateur Track and Field Association in two non-consecutive period; with the first tenure lasting from 1969 to 1981 and the second one from 1984 to 1991. Sering resigned from his PATAFA post in 1991 in favor of Go Teng Kok. In 1984, Sering was the acting director of the Project Gintong Alay government sports program. From 1985 to 1992, Sering was the President of the Philippine Olympic Committee.

== Political career ==
Sering began his political career as the governor of Surigao del Norte from 1965 to 1980.

In 1995, Sering was the campaign manager for Governor Francis T. Matugas and his brother Mayor Salvador C. Sering, who both won their elections in Surigao del Norte and Surigao City respectively. In 1999, Mantugas hired him as executive director of a sports development program council for the province.

== Involvement in sports ==
In 1969, Sering began his first term as president of the Philippine Amateur Track and Field Association (PATAFA). On November 21, 1973, he officially founded the Asian Amateur Athletic Association, and was its first president. He held the first Asian Athletics Championships to the Philippines that year. In 1981, when Michael Marcos Keon told him that he wanted the post, Sering willingly stepped aside. In 1984, he returned to the PATAFA as its president when Keon got supsended. He was also the acting director of the Project Gintong Alay government sports program that year.

In 1985, Sering became president of the Philippine Olympic Committee. It was under his term that the POC gained a reputation as being an autonomous body, as he resisted outside pressures from other officials and other religious and social bodies. That year, he endorsed athlete Lydia de Vega, who had refused to join the national team training camp, and intervened to get her on the national team for the Asean Cup that was held in the country that year. In 1987, he revived the Palarong Pambansa, as it had not been held since 1983.

From 1987 to 1988, Sering dealt with multiple issues with different NSAs. In gymnastics, a leadership dispute within the Gymnastics Association of the Philippines led to accusations of them favoring certain athletes. Sering formed an arbitration committee, but it was too late, as star gymnast Bea Lucero was held out by the gymnastics NSA and could not qualify for the 1988 Seoul Olympics despite her strong performance in the SEA Games. In boxing, he had to endorse Leopoldo Serantes and five other boxers' participation at the 1988 Olympics in front of the Court of Appeals, as there was a leadership dispute between Roilo Golez and Mel Lopez. The court dismissed the suit, and Serantes went on to win a bronze in the 1988 Olympics. He also dealt with issues with the NSAs of billiards, bowling, and within his own PATAFA as well.

Later in 1988, he was reelected as head of the POC, defeating former Gintong Alay head Joey Romasanta. Immediately after he won, he appointed Romasanta as chairman of the POC's plans and projects committee. He then oversaw the preparations for the 1991 SEA Games as president of the SEA Games federation, which saw the Philippines win 91 gold medals and almost threaten Indonesia for first place overall. After 1991, Sering semi-retired, stepping down as PATAFA president, with Go Teng Kok succeeding him. He did stay on as PATAFA's chairman, a position he would hold until his death. The following year, he lost his reelection bid for head of the POC, losing to Rene Cruz.

== Personal life ==
Sering married Socorro Bautista Limpot, with whom he had nine children. He was also the uncle of PBA player Jun Limpot. One of his daughters was Atty. Lucille Sering, who represented Limpot when the PBA suspended him for testing positive for illegal substances. She also served as Secretary of the Climate Change Commission from 2009 to 2015 and ran for district representative of Surigao del Norte in 2016 and 2022.

== Death ==
In around the 1990s, Sering underwent a quadruple bypass operation. On February 14, 2002, Sering had a heart attack at his residence in BF Homes in Parañaque. He was brought to the Alabang Medical Center in Muntinlupa where he was pronounced dead on arrival. He was aged 76 and was survived by his wife Socorro Bautista Limpot and their nine children.
