= Samahang Kickboxing ng Pilipinas =

Governing body for kickboxing in the Philippines

- Sport: Kickboxing
- Abbreviation: SKP
- (Philippines)

The Samahang Kickboxing ng Pilipinas (transl. Kickboxing Association of the Philippines; abbreviated as SKP) is the national governing body for the sport of kickboxing in the Philippines.

The organization previously existed as the Kickboxing Federation of the Philippines (KFP), however it became inactive during the time when the Philippine Olympic Committee (POC) was under the administration of POC President Peping Cojuangco. In October 2018, an assembly of kickboxing gyms and clubs was organized by POC Chairman Abraham Tolentino who was also a former president of the KFP. During that meeting the attendants were informed that kickboxing was among the proposed sports to be included in the 2019 Southeast Asian Games which would be hosted by the Philippines which prompted to the revival of a national sports association for kickboxing. This led to the formation of the SKP under its current incarnation.

On December 6, 2018, the SKP became an associate member of the POC.
