= Basketball Association of the Philippines =

Original FIBA-recognized Philippine basketball governing body

- Sport: Basketball
- Abbreviation: BAP
- Founded: 1936; 90 years ago
- Affiliation: FIBA
- Affiliation date: 1936–2007
- Regional affiliation: FIBA Asia
- Affiliation date: 1936–2007
- Headquarters: Binondo, Manila, Philippines
- President: Vacant
- (Philippines)

The Basketball Association of the Philippines (BAP) is a basketball organization in the Philippines. It was the International Basketball Federation (FIBA) recognized national governing body for basketball in the Philippines. It was recognized by the FIBA in 1936 until 2007 when the Samahang Basketbol ng Pilipinas or SBP was recognized as the new governing body of basketball in the country.

It had sanctioned mostly amateur and minor commercial leagues such as the NCRAA, UCAA, Mindanao Visayas Basketball Association and the National Basketball Conference with the BARECOM as its referees.

== History ==
The Basketball Association of the Philippines (BAP) was formed in 1936. Shortly after its formation, it organized a Philippine men's national team which took part at the 1936 Summer Olympics in Berlin.

The Philippines under BAP was awarded hosting rights to organize two FIBA World Championship; in 1962 and 1978. The 1962 hosting was revoked due to the Philippine government refusing to issue visas to national teams from communist countries.

The BAP often obliged teams of the amateur Manila Industrial and Commercial Athletic Association (MICAA) to lend players for the national team. This lead for the team owners to form the Philippine Basketball Association (PBA) in 1975. Since PBA players are professional, they cannot play in FIBA tournaments until 1990.

In 2005, FIBA suspended the Philippines due to a crisis arising from the Philippine Olympic Committee under Peping Cojuangco expelling BAP as its member. In 2007, the suspension was lifted but the then-newly formed Samahang Basketbol ng Pilipinas (SBP) replaces the BAP as the FIBA-recognized federation for the Philippines. BAP remains an extant organization and is a member of the Federation of School Sports Association of the Philippines.

The BAP still exists and is a member of the Federation of School Sports Association of the Philippines (FESSAP).

== Presidents ==
- Ambrosio Padilla (1936–68)
- Gonzalo Puyat II (1968–93)
- Freddie Jalasco (1993–2001)
- Tiny Literal (2001–05)
- Joey Lina (2005–06)
- Jinggoy Estrada (2006–07)
- Go Teng Kok (2007–11)
- Antonio Trillanes IV (2011–2016)
- Robert Milton Calo (2016–2026)

Preceded by (original)	FIBA-recognized national association in the Philippines; 1936–2007	Succeeded by Samahang Basketbol ng Pilipinas
Preceded by (original)	Philippine Olympic Committee-recognized national association in the Philippines; 1936–2005	Succeeded by Philippine Basketball Federation, Inc.
