= Emmanuel Angeles =

- Born: Emmanuel Yap Angeles; 1935 or 1936 (age 89–90)
- Known for: 2nd President of the Angeles University Foundation, President of Gymnastics Association of the Philippines (1986–1990), President of the Clark Development Corporation (2001–2005)
- Spouse: Cornelia Lukban
- Children: 3

Emmanuel Yap Angeles is a Filipino educator, lawyer and sports administrator.

== Early life ==
Emmanuel Yap Angeles born in 1935 or 1936. He was the third, and eldest son, of eight children of farmer Emmanuel P. Angeles and teacher Barbara Dytiongco Yap. His father was from Angeles while his mother was from Arayat, Pampanga. Both hail from the province of Pampanga. Barbara Dytiongco Yap founded the Angeles Academy in 1931 which only existed for two years.

Angeles studied at the Ateneo de Manila University, obtaining his law degree in 1960. He passed the Philippine Bar Examinations the following year.

He attended the University of Santo Tomas attaining his master's degree in law in 1968 and his doctorate in political science in 1972. He later finished his studies in educational management in Harvard University in Boston in the United States.

== Career ==
=== Angeles University Foundation ===
Angeles became the second president of Angeles University Foundation (AUF). AUF was established by his family in 1962 as the Angeles Institute of Technology and became a university in 1971. During his tenure he converted the institution from a regular university to a foundation under the Foundation Law (Republic Act No. 6055).

The AUF opened its College of Medicine in 1982, the first medical school in Central Luzon. It was followed by a university hospital, the Angeles University Foundation Medical Center which opened in 1990.

=== Gymnastics Association of the Philippines ===
The Gymnastics Association of the Philippines (GAP), the national sports association for gymnastics in the country, had Angeles as its president from 1986 to 1990. In 1986 until February 1987, the GAP operated a training center at the Rizal Memorial Gymnasium. Angeles pledged to establish more training centers nationwide. Among these were the proposed 10,000-seater gymnastics center within the University of the Philippines campus

However in February 1987, Angeles was subject to controversy after a confrontation between him and University of the East (UE) gymnasts occurred during the national team tryouts. A video tape recorder captured the incident showing Angeles saying that the gymnasts were disqualified. He denied the allegations and insist the gymnasts were still eligible to gain a berth and that they walked out from the venue. The GAP also had a disagreement with the Philippine Olympic Committee on who has the right to screen gymnasts for international competitions.

=== Clark Development Corporation ===
Angeles was appointed by then President Gloria Macapagal Arroyo as the president and chief executive of the Clark Development Corporation (CDC) in March 15, 2001.

He increased the net income of CDC from ₱2.3 million in 2001 to ₱37.52 million in 2004 by developing the Clark Freeport Zone as an "aerotropolis". His term ended on March 16, 2005 and was succeeded by Antonio Ng.

== Personal life ==
Angeles is married to Cornelia Lukban, an anesthesiologist, with whom he had three children. His children grew up to be lawyers. His son, John Emmanuel became acting president of AUF in 2009.
