= Integrated Cycling Federation of the Philippines =

Sports governing body in the Philippines

- Sport: Cycling
- Jurisdiction: Philippines
- Abbreviation: PhilCycling
- Founded: 2003
- Affiliation: UCI
- Headquarters: Tagaytay, Philippines
- President: Abraham Tolentino
- Replaced: Philippine Amateur Cycling Association

Official website
- philcycling.wordpress.com
- (Philippines)

The Integrated Cycling Federation of the Philippines (PhilCycling) is the national governing body for cycling as a sports in the Philippines. It is duly recognised by the Philippine Sports Commission and the Philippine Olympic Committee and the Union Cycliste Internationale.

== History ==
=== Background ===
==== PACA and PCAP era ====
The Union Cycliste Internationale (UCI) has previously recognized two governing bodies of cycling in the Philippines; the Philippine Amateur Cycling Association (PACA) for amateur cycling and the Professional Cycling Association of the Philippines (PCAP) for professional side of the sport. Francisco Almeda began his long-time stint as PACA president in 1974. The National Cycling Open has been held during Almeda's term with the last edition organized in 1985 in Cagayan de Oro.

UCI president Hein Verbruggen has called for countries to merge their amateur and professional associations claiming that the Philippines remained an exception by 1993. In 1994, Almeda secured a sixth term to lead the PACA. The international Marlboro Tour of 1997 and 1998 were held under the auspices of the PACA.

==== 2000–2001 leadership dispute ====
However a leadership crisis broke up with the death of former PACA head Francisco Almeda in 1998. The controversy became public in November 2000, when Joaqui Preysler claimed to have been elected as president in January 2000. Ponciano Regalado Jr. disputes Preysler's leadership, who was sworn in as Officer-in-Charge in December 4, 2000. On December 9, a general assembly was called off due to a lack of forum but Preysler and Pociano agreed to resolve the dispute in another general assembly on January 13, 2001.

However the crisis persisted, when both factions held separate elections on February 3, 2001. Ponciano was elected president by his group while Preyler's group elected Ramonito Durano III to lead them.

In an unrelated development, the UCI withdrew recognition of the PCAP in 2002 accelerating the integration of governance of amateur and professional cycling into one body. By 2003, PCAP became the Philippine National Cycling Association.

==== PCF split ====
On May 29, 2002, PACA suspended its own president Regalado over financial irregularities over funds provided by the Philippine Sports Commission as well as for withdrawing the association's sanction of the Tour of Calabarzon over disagreements regarding the sanction fee and race officials with organizers.

In June 19, 2002, Regalado declared the PACA abolished and supplanted by the Philippine Cycling Federation (PCF). Regalado was named president of the PCF. The faction cite UCI president's call to organize a cycling body which will not discriminate between professional and amateur cycling and has disclosed that the move was being planned since last year. However the UCI, continued to recognize the PACA which is led by president Antonio Cruz who was formerly Regolado's executive vice president.

=== PhilCycling ===
==== Lina administration ====
The Integrated Cycling Federation of the Philippines (PhilCycling) was proposed as a replacement for the PACA. Alberto Lina expressed openness to lead the PACA back in 2002 when he was asked during the launch of the 2002 revival of the Tour Pilipinas. Lina was later elected in September 2003. The Philippine Olympic Committee recognized PhilCycling as the national sports association for cycling in the Philippines transferring the previous status of the PACA.

Under Lina, the cycling delegation's medal count at the SEA Games gradually improved from a lone medal in the 2003 edition, two in the 2005, and four 2007.

==== 2008–12 leadership crisis ====
A leadership dispute broke after breakaway group, voted in Rolando Hiso as president in a! election in December 13, 2008. Abraham Tolentino was then elected president on January 16, 2009.Hiso was affirmed as president of his faction after a May 9, 2009 ordered by the Philippine Olympic Committee (POC) led by its president Peping Cojuangco and boycotted by Tolentino's faction. Hiso was replaced by Mikee Romero's as the faction's leader. However the UCI and the Asian Cycling Confederation continued to recognize Tolentino's leadership while the POC supported Romero.

The dispute caused the Philippines unable to send cyclists for the 2009 SEA Games in Laos. The 13-member team had twelve of its members disqualified for lacking a UCI license, and Marites Bitbit the lone eligible cyclist was convinced by Cojuangco to withdraw from competing. Romero quit as president of the Cojuangco-supported PhilCycling faction in December 2009.

On August 21, 2010, Philip Juico was elected as PhilCycling president of the second faction used to be headed by Romero. He vowed that what happened in the 2009 SEA Games will not happen again. The Philippines were able to send delegates to the 2010 Asian Games in China despite the dispute. In the lead up to the 2011 SEA Games in Indonesia, the Juico and Tolentino factions also signed a memorandum of agreement in March 2011 to sign a unified team.

The leadership crisis was resolved after Tolentino was voted in as PhilCycling's president in the July 3, 2012 election.

==== Tolentino administration ====
The widely recognized administration of Abraham Tolentino as president of Philcycling began in 2012. Lina was elected as chairman. The new board was recognized by POC president Cojuangco.

Tolentino was re-elected in December 2020 with a pledge to resume cycling activities in the Philippines amidst the COVID-19 pandemic. He also was instrumental to the construction of a new velodrome in Tagaytay. Receiving funds from the UCI, the Tagaytay City Velodrome in Tagaytay, Cavite was built and then inaugurated on June 23, 2025. It hosted the 2026 Asian Track Cycling Championships

== Presidents ==
- Alberto Lina (2003–2009)
- 2008–2012 dispute
  - Abraham Tolentino (UCI-recognized; 2009–2012)
  - Rolando Hiso (2008–2009)
  - Mikee Romero (2009)
  - Philip Juico (2010–2012)
- Abraham Tolentino (2012–present)
