= Shell National Youth Active Chess Championship =

Tournament held in the Philippines

The Shell National Youth Active Chess Championship is a yearly chess competition held in the Philippines, opened for young chess players, male or female, with amateur experience in playing the sport. It was founded in 1992. In 2015, the competition was split into three divisions: Kiddie (for 7 to 12 years old), Junior (for 13 to 16 years old) and Seniors (for 17 to 20 year old).

The chess tournament is organized by Pilipinas Shell Petroleum Corporation and sanctioned by the NCFP.

Oliver Dimakiling and Wesley So played in this tournament before they rose to fame as chess grandmasters.

== 2015 edition ==
In 2015, the tournament had five elimination phases held in different SM Supermalls, which were National Capital Region, Southern Luzon, Visayas, Southern Mindanao and Northern Mindanao in June to August of the same year, with the national finals held at the SM Megamall Activity Center September 19-20. Leading the cast of the 48 participants from different parts of the country in the championships were 2015 NCR Leg winners Marc Labog, Julius Gonzales and Jerome Aragones.

In the national finals, Daniel Quizon, Genesis Borromeo, and McDominque Lagula won the Kiddie, Junior, and Senior categories, respectively.

== See also ==
- Shell Turbo Chargers (the petroleum firm's franchise in the PBA)
