= Samahang Basketbol ng Pilipinas =

National basketball association of the Philippines

- Sport: Basketball
- Abbreviation: SBP
- Founded: September 21, 2006; 20 years ago
- Affiliation: FIBA
- Affiliation date: 2007
- Regional affiliation: FIBA Asia
- Affiliation date: 2007
- Headquarters: PhilSports Complex
- Location: Pasig, Metro Manila, Philippines
- President: Ricky Vargas
- Chairman: Manny Pangilinan
- Director: Erika Dy
- Men's coach: Tim Cone
- Women's coach: BT Toews
- Replaced: Basketball Association of the Philippines (BAP)
- (founded): 1936; 90 years ago

Official website
- www.sbp.ph
- (Philippines)

The Samahang Basketbol ng Pilipinas (lit. 'Basketball Federation of the Philippines') or the SBP is the national sport association for basketball in the Philippines, formed from the merging of the Basketball Association of the Philippines (BAP) and Pilipinas Basketball (PB).

It was formed in order to fix a long running feud in Philippine Basketball that resulted in FIBA suspending the country from participating in FIBA-sanctioned events. Both groups signed a joint communique during the FIBA Congress in Saitama, Japan in September 2006.

Manuel V. Pangilinan, chairman of the Philippine Long Distance Telephone Company, and owner of the PBA teams TNT Tropang Giga, Meralco Bolts and NLEX Road Warriors was named as the first president of the organization on February 5, 2007, up until August 8, 2016. He was succeeded by Al Panlilio, who served as the PBA team governor of the Meralco Bolts.

== Formation ==
=== FIBA suspension ===
In 2005, the BAP-formed Cebuana-Lhuillier Philippine National Team, made up of little-known amateur players, lost to the Parañaque Jets, owned by city Vice Mayor and comedian Anjo Yllana in the 2005 National Basketball Conference preseason tournament. The Jets were bannered by actors and showbiz personalities, while the BAP team was supposed to have been sent to represent the country in an international tournament. This led to calls from Philippine Olympic Committee President Jose "Peping" Cojuangco to reform the BAP's programs and send a national team made up of professional players from the Philippine Basketball Association.

However, disagreements became bitter in mid-2005 as both groups wanted to have their own teams represent the country to the SEABA Men's Basketball tournament in Malaysia. The BAP also replaced Quinteliano "Tiny" Literal with former Philippine senator and Laguna governor Joey Lina as president of the basketball body. The POC intended to reform the BAP's basketball program, but the BAP resisted, and warned the POC to stay out of the situation. As the dispute continued, other National Sports Associations of the POC convened, and expelled the association as the National Sport Association for basketball in the country and created the Philippine Basketball Federation, Inc. as the new basketball governing body. The FIBA, meanwhile, continued to recognize only the BAP and instructed its leaders to sort out the issue.

In July 2005, the International Basketball Federation (FIBA) suspended the Philippines from all FIBA-sanctioned tournaments due to disagreements between the Basketball Association of the Philippines (BAP) and the Philippine Olympic Committee.

In late 2005, the POC received a memorandum that would pave the way for the country's major stakeholders the PBA, PBL, UAAP, and NCAA and Joey Lina, then-BAP President to represent the BAP to form another new association, which materialized in March 2006, and was eventually known as Pilipinas Basketball.

However, the talks stalled when Lina backed out from the formation of the group. Pilipinas Basketball tried its luck to gain FIBA recognition from FIBA Secretary-General Patrick Baumann but was denied, urging them to "keep the course".

For the next five months, talks for a resolution remained silent.

=== The Joint Communique ===
During the 2006 FIBA World Championship in Saitama, Japan, the FIBA Congress was also held in conjunction with the event. Both representatives from the BAP and Pilipinas Basketball separately to meet with FIBA officials to gain recognition.

After talks with both groups, FIBA through Baumann and other representatives invited both parties to sit down and negotiate a solution. After lengthy talks and reportedly some shouting matches, both groups decided to instead form a new basketball body with both members of the BAP and PB joining forces.

The joint communique said that both parties have promised to fix the problem within a month with a three-man panel made up of then-BAP head Lina and Pilipinas Basketball President Bernie Atienza and a neutral person to oversee the formation.

The neutral person was supposed to have been former PBA commissioner Atty. Rudy Salud. Salud, who formed the by-laws of the PBA refused the offer for health reasons. Eventually Lina and Atienza asked PLDT chairman Manuel V. Pangilinan to be the third person.

Eventually the by-laws were formed and a congress was due to be held in November for the election of officers.

The panel agreed to name the new organization as the Samahang Basketbol ng Pilipinas.

=== Lina's resignation, Jinggoy named new BAP head ===
In a twist of events, Lina resigned as BAP President stalling the formation of the association. It was reported that several members of the BAP were not willing to cooperate with the limited power sharing with Pilipinas Basketball.

Eventually, BAP hired Philippine senator Jinggoy Estrada, son of former Philippine President Joseph Estrada, as its president. One of Estrada's first moves was to try to convince the POC to reinstate the BAP and also asked the Philippine Sports Commission to open the padlocked BAP office. However, those requests were denied, but Estrada was given explanation by POC President Jose Cojuangco about the reasons for the BAP expulsion.

=== Agreement in Hong Kong ===
Two days before Christmas, Estrada and Pangilinan agreed on a power sharing that could result in the end of the FIBA suspension. Under the agreement, Estrada will be named as the SBP Chairman while Pangilinan will be named SBP President. Both also agreed on Ricky Vargas, the Talk N' Text Phone Pals Governor and Pangilinan's business aide and Lito Alvarez, the Air21 Express Governor and one of the key figures in the BAP, to be given positions in the association.

The move was lauded by many within the basketball community and gave hope for the possible return of the Philippines in international competitions.

=== BAP fires Estrada ===
In early-January 2007, the BAP rejected the agreement between Pangilinan and Estrada, citing "Estrada's cooperating with Pilipinas Basketball move without consultation from the BAP". On January 6, 2007, the BAP released a press statement announcing the firing of Estrada as its BAP president. The position was declared vacant with Christian Tan named as interim president.

The move was blasted by PBA Commissioner Noli Eala and PBL Commissioner Chino Trinidad. Senator Estrada, however, remained with the SBP to continue to formation of the association and even went to Geneva along with a group led by Pangilinan and Eala to talk with FIBA Secretary-General Patrick Baumann about the SBP's progress. Baumann responded by saying that the suspension will be lifted once a new organization is formed through a Basketball Unity Congress.

The BAP then hired track-and-field president Go Teng Kok as their BAP President. Rumors also surfaced that the BAP had intended to boycott the Unity Congress and to issue a TRO but the rumors where denied by the 70-year organization.

=== Unity Congress ===
A week before the unity congress, both BAP and PB separately went to Bangkok for talks with Baumann and FIBA-Asia representatives. After talks between leaders of both the BAP and the PB, the two groups agreed to settle differences and moved ahead with the congress.

On February 5, 2007, the Unity Congress was held formally electing Pangilinan as its president. The event was graced by members of the BAP, PB, the Philippine Olympic Committee, and a host of observers that included Baumann, who issued a statement saying the suspension has been lifted pending approval by the POC as its NSA for basketball.

As part of the approval, both agreed to call the organization as the BAP-Samahang Basketbol ng Pilipinas, Inc.

=== 2008 lawsuit ===
The Court of Appeals of the Philippines' Special 11th division, on October 6, 2008, granted a 60-day temporary restraining order on Manuel V. Pangilinan's certiorari against Prospero A. Pichay, Jr. and Camarines Sur Rep. Luis Villafuerte's control of BAP-SBP. The TRO nullified the enforcement of the September 3 Manila Regional Trial Court, Branch 24 order, favoring Villafuerte's group. Earlier, Manila Judge Antonio Eugenio Jr. held that "the June 12, 2008 convention-election called by the SBP faction of Pangilinan, as President, and Misamis Oriental Governor Oscar Moreno, as Chair, was null and void, and the June 4, 2008 National Congress, which was attended by majority of the stakeholders who elected former congressman Prospero Pichay as BAP-SBP president and Villafuerte as chairman, was valid." The RTC annulled the election after Villafuerte's group revealed only 19 out of the 87 member-associations attended the election while the June 4 elections was authorized by majority of the 87 stakeholders that attended the National Congress initiated by Villafuerte, as BAP-SBP chairman. The decision of the Manila RTC was eventually overturned by the Court of Appeals' Special 9th division on November 18, 2008, in a 16-page decision which recognized the legitimacy of the June 12 convention-election. The supposed election of Villafuerte as SBP chairman, according to the decision, had no legal basis, since the Camarines Sur congressman is not a legitimate member of the board of trustees. "Based on the Bangkok agreement forged between the warring BAP and SBP, the chairman of the SBP should be a member of the SBP board of trustees. Although Villafuerte is serving as BAP chairman, he was never a part of the merger." As a result, the association formally changed its name to Samahang Basketbol ng Pilipinas. According to SBP Executive Director Noli Eala: “Yes, we have dropped BAP from the official name of the legitimate national basketball association of the country”

On October 6, 2009, the Supreme Court ruled, supporting with the decision of the Court on Appeals, on recognizing the Eala and Moreno as executive director and chairman, respectively, of the SBP.

=== Retirement of MVP and the new SBP board ===
SBP logo from 2019 to 2023.

Pangilinan, who used to serve as the first president of SBP for two consecutive terms, announced in a press conference on October 8, 2015, that he will retire as the head of the basketball NSA.

MVP, and 12 other officials of the said NSA, Ricky Vargas, Bernie Atienza, Pete Alfaro, Danny Soria, Fr. Paul De Vera, Niewncanor Jorge, Raul Alcozeba, Dr. Jay Adalem, Mayor Oca Moreno, Robert Uy, Vivian Manila, and Rey Gamboa were already expired their terms last February 2015, but the elections were not conducted due to "busy schedule" of the stakeholders. SBP will hold the general elections on August 8, 2016 (supposedly scheduled for January 2016, but it was delayed due to the Philippines' hosting of the 2016 FIBA World Olympic Qualifying Tournaments for Men) to elect the possible replacements of Pangilinan and other members of the SBP board.

During the election, a new set of board of trustees were elected. The board composed of four representatives from the PBA (Chito Narvasa, Robert Non, Al Panlilio, and Erick Arejola), 1 from youth sector (Sonny Angara), three from commercial sector (Robbie Puno, Ricky Palou, and Jobin Jarvis Uy), 5 from collegiate and junior leagues (Ronnie Dizer, Paul Supan, Joe Lipa, Xavi Nunag, and Melanie Florentino), 1 from women's sector (Monica Jorge), and 11 from local leagues, representing the 5 areas (Joey Guillermo, Bernardino Bermudez, Crispulo Onrubia, Virgilio Cortez, Rey Bautista, Benjo Viola, Ramoncito Fernandez, Enrico Navarro, Fr. Joseph Haw, Glenn Escandor and Stephen Dacoco). After the election, the newly elected board of trustees elected the new set of officers of the SBP. Panlilio named president, Angara named chairman, Puno named Vice Chairman, and Palou named Treasurer. Sonny Barrios, was retained as the executive director, while Panlilio's predecessor, Pangilinan was appointed as the chairman emeritus of the organization.

On January 8, 2024, SBP named Erika Dy as its new executive director replacing Sonny Barrios after 12 years.

== Programs ==
The main program of the SBP is the men's national basketball team. Recently, the country placed 9th in the 2022 FIBA Asia Cup in Jakarta, Indonesia and 24th in the 2023 FIBA Basketball World Cup, which the Philippines co-hosted alongside Japan and Indonesia. The FIBA Asia squad was sponsored primarily by the PBA, San Miguel Corporation and Smart Communications. The SBP is now preparing teams for the 2024 FIBA World Olympic Qualifying Tournament, which is a result of their 24th place finish at the World Cup. The SBP will also prepare a team for the 2025 FIBA Asia Cup. Other programs include the women's national team, the men's under-18/19 youth squad, the women's under-18/19 youth squad, and the men's under-16/17 youth squad.

In 2019, the SBP reorganized the Gilas Pilipinas brand to include the women's, youth, and 3x3 basketball programs in addition to the men's program.

== Current tournaments ==
The SBP organizes these tournaments:

- SBP Pambansang Tatluhan (3x3 qualifying tournaments)

The SBP formerly organized these tournaments:

- Philippine Collegiate Champions League (2008-2020)
- Liga Pilipinas (2008–2011)
- 2022 FilBasket International Championship

== National team ==
- Men's (Senior, U-19, U-17, 3x3)
- Women's (Senior, U-19, U-17, 3x3)

== See also ==
- Basketball Association of the Philippines
- Pilipinas Basketball
- Gilas Pilipinas

Preceded by Basketball Association of the Philippines	FIBA-recognized national association in the Philippines; 2007-present	Succeeded by (incumbent)
Preceded by Pilipinas Basketball	Philippine Olympic Committee-recognized national association in the Philippines; 2007-present	Succeeded by (incumbent)
