= Philippine Ski and Snowboard Federation =

Sports governing body in the Philippines

- Sport: Snow skiing, Snowboarding
- Abbreviation: PSSF
- Headquarters: Lakewood, California, United States
- President: Jemuel Apelar
- (Philippines)

The Philippine Ski and Snowboard Federation, Inc. (PSSF) is the governing body of snow skiing and snowboarding in the Philippines. The sporting body is based in Lakewood, California in the United States and is a member of the Fédération Internationale de Ski since 1971. It was known as the Philippine Ski Federation from 2005 to 2020.

The organization is a full member of the Philippine Olympic Committee since 2022.

The national sporting association oversees athletes participating in various competitive sports events, including cross-country skiing, alpine skiing, freestyle skiing, freeskiing (slopestyle and big air), snowboarding, and roller skiing.

It has backed the participation of athletes in the Winter Olympics.

While the Philippines is not known to have snowfall, the PSFF has set up four roller skiing clubs in Rizal.
