= Ju-Jitsu Federation of the Philippines =

Jiu-Jitsu association

- Sport: Ju-Jitsu
- Membership: JJFF, PSC, POC
- Abbreviation: JFP
- Founded: 2015
- Headquarters: Philippines, Manila
- President: Ferdie Agustin
- Vice president: Philip Manalaysay
- Secretary: Antonio Sulit Jr.
- (Philippines)

Ju-Jitsu Federation of the Philippines (abbreviated as JFP) is the national sports association (NSA) for Jujitsu in the Philippines. It was formed in 2015 and represented by 50 jujitsu clubs in the country. Currently, JFP is a member of Ju-Jitsu International Federation, Ju-Jitsu Asian Union and the Philippine Olympic Committee (POC).

It was admitted as the 50th regular member of the Philippine Olympic Committee in November 2015.
