= Karate Pilipinas =

Governing body of Karate in the Philippines

Karate Pilipinas Sports Federation
- Sport: Karate
- Jurisdiction: Philippines
- Abbreviation: KP
- Founded: 2018
- Affiliation: WKF
- Regional affiliation: AKF
- President: Richard Lim
- (Philippines)

Karate Pilipinas Sports Federation, Inc., simply known as Karate Philippines, is the local governing body for the sport of Karate in the Philippines. KP was formed in early 2018, and subsequently recognized by the World Karate Federation as a temporary member in July 2018, potentially replacing the embattled NSA for Karate, the Philippine Karatedo Federation–N.S.A., Inc. (PKF-NSA), which was withdrawn in April 2018 from WKF due to alleged malversation of training allowance of athletes competed in the 2017 Southeast Asian Games. KP is also recognized by the Asian Karatedo Federation.

The WKF would grant Karate Pilipinas full recognition in November 2018 if the PKF-NSA don't express its position against delisting. Karate Pilipinas became a regular member of the KWF in November 2021

== See also ==
- Asian Karatedo Championships
