= Angeles University Foundation =

Roman Catholic university in Angeles, Philippines

- Pundasyong Pamantasang Angeles (Filipino)
- Other name: AUF
- Former name: Angeles Institute of Technology (1962–1971)
- Motto: Total Development of Man for God and Humanity
- Type: Private research non-profit coeducational basic and higher education institution
- Established: May 25, 1962; 64 years ago
- Founders: Agustin P. Angeles; Barbara Yap-Angeles
- Religious affiliation: Roman Catholic
- Academic affiliations: PAASCU
- Chairman: Gloria Macapagal Arroyo
- President: Joseph Emmanuel Angeles
- Vice-president: Archimedes David (VP for Academic Affairs); Maria Loreto Canlas (VP for Finance); Jose Macapagal, Jr. (VP for Administration)
- Students: 6,500+
- Undergraduates: 5,500
- Location: MacArthur Highway, Claro M. Recto, Angeles City, Pampanga, Philippines; 15°08′42″N 120°35′46″E
- Campus: Urban; Main: Brgy. Claro M. Recto, Angeles City 5 hectares (50,000 m^{2}) (College); Satellite: Sta. Barbara Campus 4 hectares (40,000 m^{2}) (Grade School, Jr. & Sr. High School)
- Colors: Blue and White
- Nickname: Great Danes
- Mascot: Great Dane
- Website: www.auf.edu.ph angelesuniversityfoundation.com
- Location in Luzon Location in the Philippines

The Angeles University Foundation (Filipino: Pundasyong Pamantasan ng Angeles) also referred to by its acronym AUF, is a private Roman Catholic non-stock, non-profit educational institution run by lay persons in Angeles City. It was established on May 25, 1962, by Agustin P. Angeles, Barbara Yap-Angeles, and their family.

The university was granted autonomous status and certified with the Institutional Quality Assurance Monitoring and Evaluation (IQuAME) by the Commission of Higher Education. It is an ISO-certified university. Three of its programs are recognized as Centers of Development.

== History ==
Angeles University Foundation was established on May 25, 1962, by the Angeles family of Angeles, Pampanga in the Philippines. It began as the Angeles Institute of Technology (AIT) but after 9 years of operation, the institution was granted University status on April 16, 1971, by the Department of Education, Culture and Sports.

On December 4, 1975, the university was converted into a non-stock, non-profit educational foundation with the aim of providing education to the Central Luzon region. Concomitant with this decision, the Angeles couple and their children, namely, Rosario, Lutgarda, Emmanuel, Antonio, Jesusa, Josefina and Lourdes executed a Deed of Donation of their shareholdings in favor of the foundation as starting fund which resulted to the relinquishment of their ownership and proprietary rights. AUF was incorporated under Republic Act No. 6055, otherwise known as the Foundation Law, and is a tax-exempt institution approved by the Philippine government.

On February 14, 1978, AUF was converted into a Catholic university making it the first in Central Luzon. On February 20, 1990, the AUF Medical Center was inaugurated which would serve as the teaching, training, and research hospital of the university.

== Campus ==
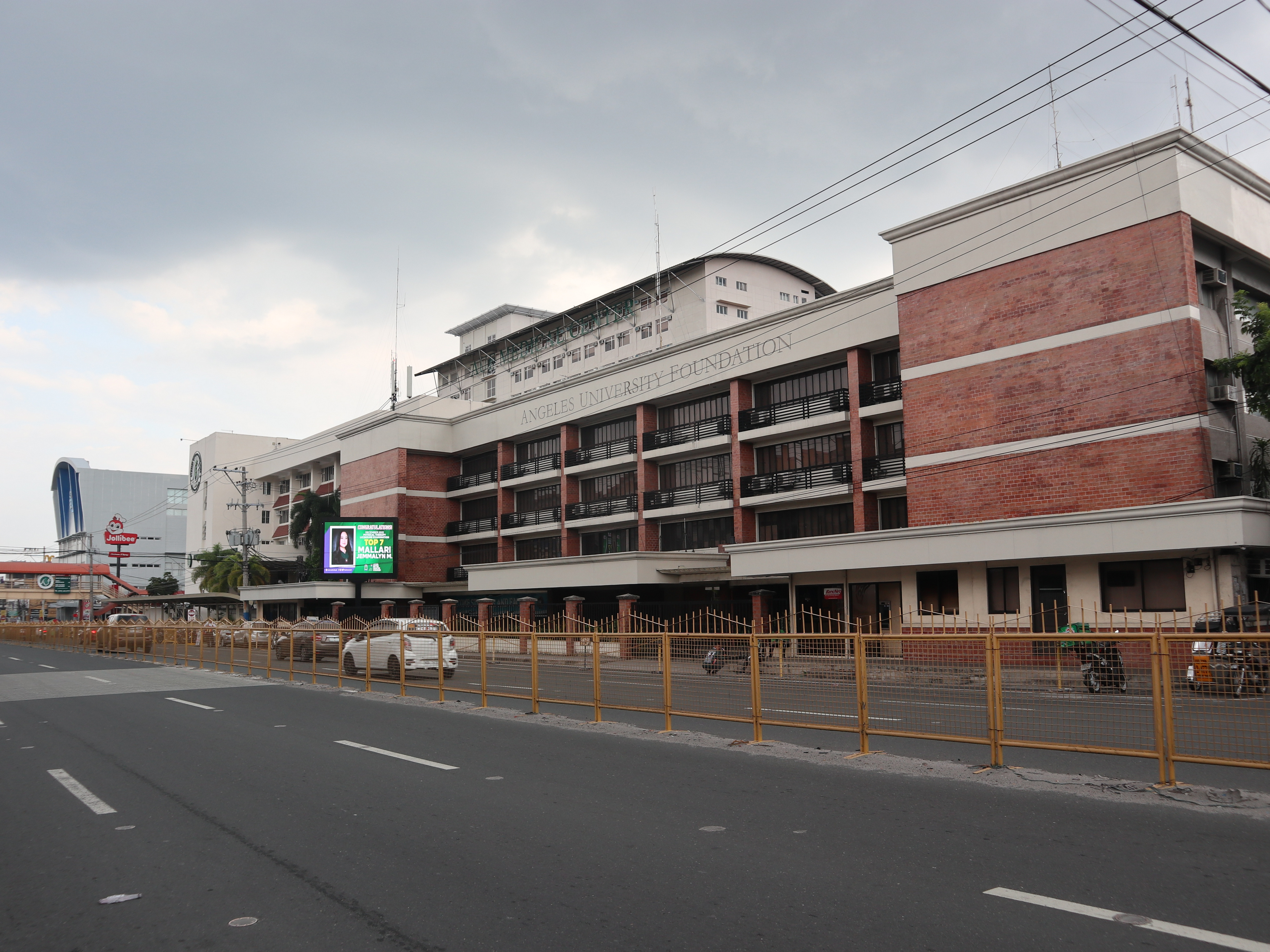
Angeles University Foundation campus

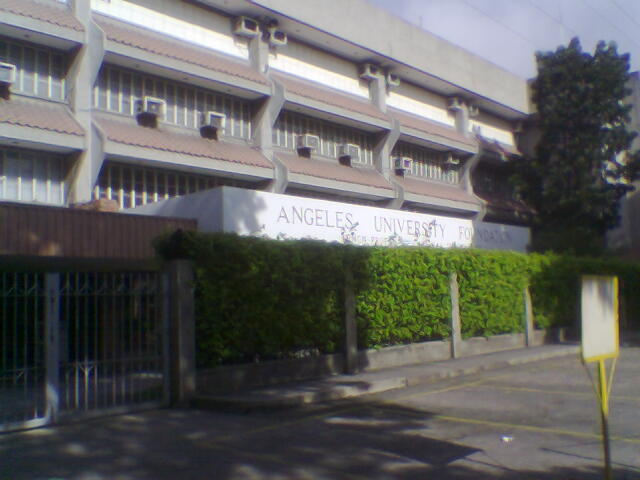
Angeles Hall (formerly known as Barbara Yap Angeles Building)

The campus is located along MacArthur Highway in Salapungan, Angeles City. Urban in setting, it is located within the business area of the city. The Elementary and High School departments of the university, however, are located in Marisol Village about 3 kilometers away from the main campus.

=== AUF Main Campus ===
- Angeles Hall, also known as the Administration Building, houses most of the administrative offices and named after its founders. Home to the Colleges of Engineering, Arts and Sciences, Education and Criminal Justice Education.
- Lourdes Hall, the university library.
- The Twin Building (San Agustin Hall and San Lorenzo Hall), which contains the School of Medicine, College of Nursing and College of Allied Medical Professions.
- Information Technology and Training Center (ITTC Building), houses the College of Computer Studies.

=== AUF Professional Schools ===
The Professional Schools Building, opened in 2004, houses the Graduate School, Law School, College of Business Administration, two libraries and classrooms. It is linked to the AUF Medical Center via footbridge.

=== AUF Sports and Cultural Center ===
The Sports and Cultural Center is a four-story athletics complex which houses the Events Hall, jogging track and a basketball court.

=== AUF Medical Center ===
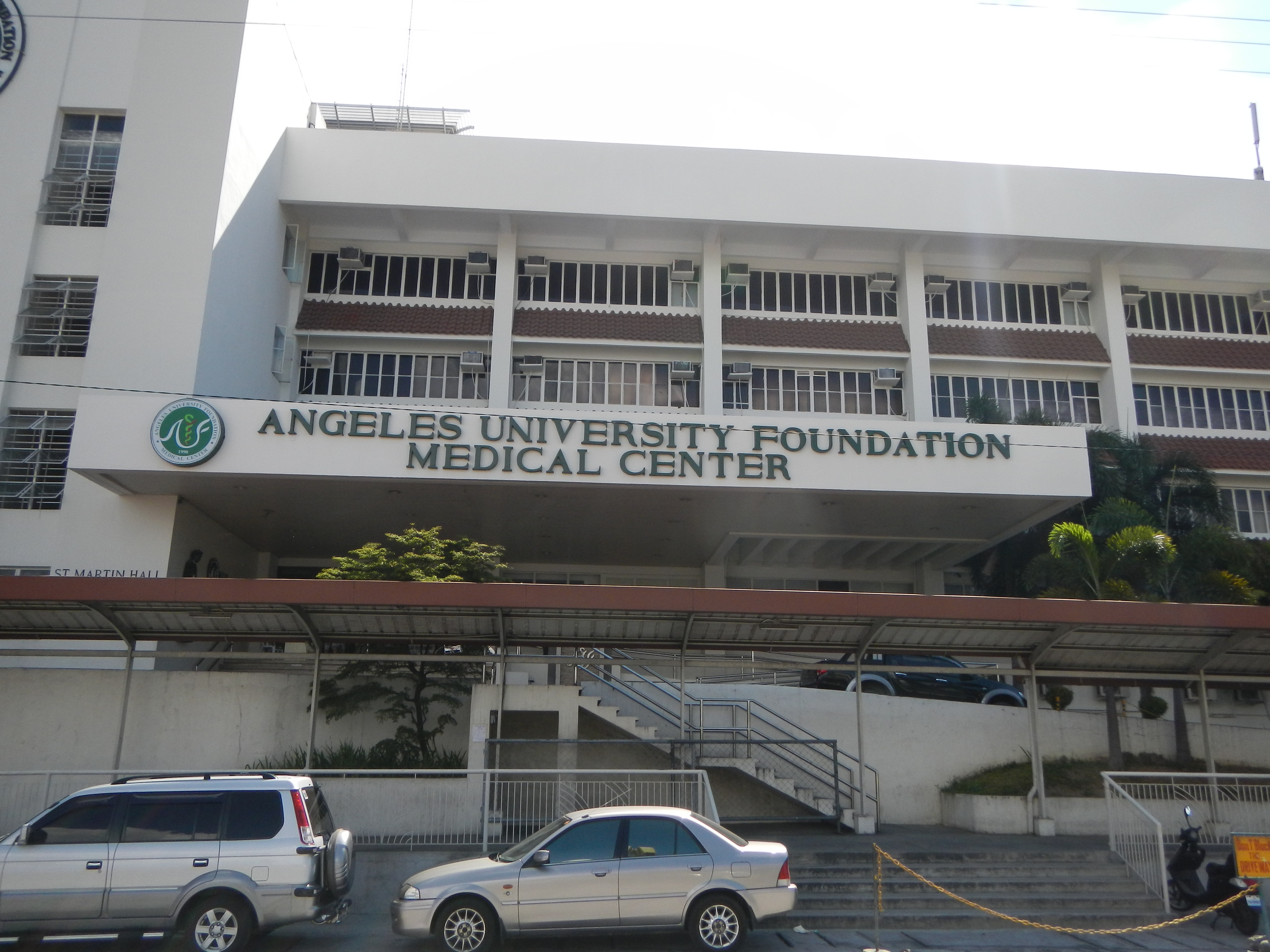
Angeles University Foundation Medical Center

The AUF Medical Center (AUFMC) has a five-story Main Building and a 12-storey Medical Tower which features a helipad for air ambulances. It serves as a training hospital for the medical undergraduates of the university.

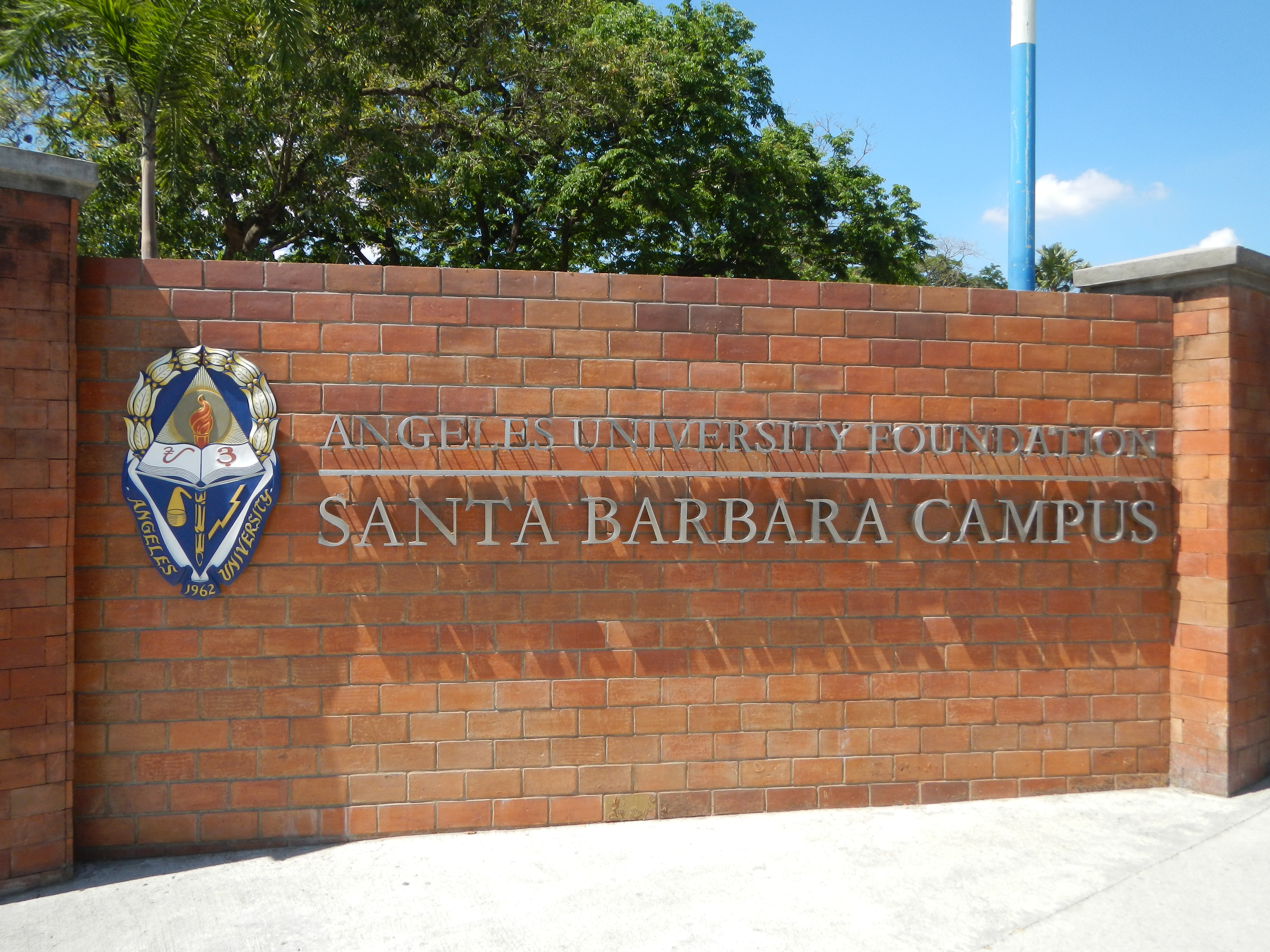
Santa Barbara Campus

=== AUF Santa Barbara Campus ===
The Santa Barbara Campus houses the AUF Integrated School (AUF-IS) which serves elementary to senior high school levels. The four-hectare property includes the AUF Museum, a football field, and covered court.

=== AUF Residences ===
The AUF Residences consist of two separate buildings along Donya Aurora street. They can accommodate a maximum of 355 residents.

== Academics ==
With the major and professional (minor) subjects aside, all undergraduate students are required to take 12 units of Theology classes. The students are also required to attend four physical education classes, and a choice from between ROTC and civil service training. The university is home to 8 undergraduate colleges, with the College of Arts and Sciences as the oldest. There is also a School of Medicine and School of Law apart from the Graduate School. The Commission on Higher Education has recognized three of its programs as Centers of Development, namely in Business Administration, Industrial Engineering and Teacher Education.

=== AUF Professional School ===
The AUF Professional School (Graduate School) was established in 1966 as the AUF Graduate School, with an initial enrolment of 15 in the Master of Arts in Education program.

=== School of Medicine ===
The Angeles University Foundation School of Medicine, which was established by the authority of the Board of Medical Education and the Department of Education, Culture, and Sports, started its operations in June 1983, with an authorized quota of 150 students. Dr. Rodolfo C. Dimayuga was appointed as the first dean, Dr. Presentacion C. Peralta as assistant dean, concurrently college secretary, and a faculty of 18.

=== School of Law ===
The AUF College of Law was established in response to the clamor for legal education in Central Luzon. The establishment of the college earned approval from the AUF Board of Trustees on August 19, 2003, during its 56th Regular Meeting presided over by Pampanga Archbishop Paciano B. Aniceto, D.D., in his capacity as chairman of the board.

=== Colleges ===
==== College of Allied Medical Professions ====
The College of Allied Medical Professions, abbreviated as CAMP, was established during the Academic Year 1990–1991 with two programs: Bachelor of Science in Physical Therapy and Bachelor of Science in Medical Technology. These full-time competency-based programs were approved by the Department of Education, Culture and Sports and the Professional Regulatory Commission and were granted Government Recognition on June 15, 1992 (Medical Technology) and August 25, 1993 (Physical Therapy).

==== College of Arts and Sciences ====
The College of Arts and Sciences was established in 1962 as the College of Liberal Arts and Education. It started with two (2) four-year courses leading to the degrees of Bachelor of Arts (A.B.) and Bachelor of Science (B.S.) in Foreign Service, and a two-year course in Associate in Arts (A.A.). The initial enrolment was only eighteen students under five faculty members.

==== College of Business and Accountancy ====
The College of Business and Accountancy was established in 1962 with the founding of Angeles Institute of Technology. It was initially named College of Commerce with an enrolment of thirty-three (33) students. It was in July 1963 that the college was given government recognition (DECS No. 70, Series 1963) to offer the first and second year programs of the Bachelor of Science in commerce. In 1966–67, the college graduated the first batch of five students.

==== College of Computer Studies ====
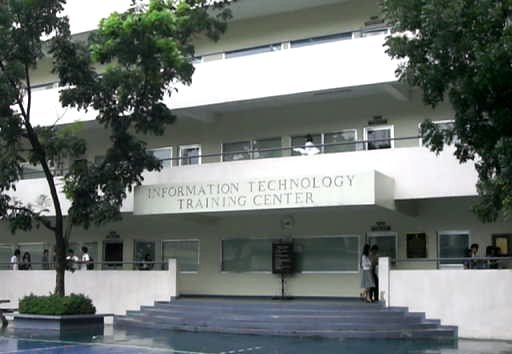
Information Technology Training Center (ITTC Building)

The College of Computer Studies started as the AUF Computer Center which was conceptualized as a pilot project of Dr. Teresita B. Ireneo, then the Dean of the College of Business and Economics and Philippine Encoding Corporation (PENCOR). After a very successful class demonstration in June 1983, and after receiving its government recognition, the center formally began operations. It is now a Center of Excellence in I.T. Education as accredited by the Commission on Higher Education.

At present, the college has earned the distinction of being the only Nodal Station of Central Luzon which provides information technology training programs to different educational institutions in the region.

The college is affiliated with IBM Academic Initiative Program, Oracle Academic Initiative, MSDN Academic Alliance and Philippine Open Source Initiative. It also affiliated with national IT organizations such as the Philippine Society of I.T. Education, Philippine Computer Society and the Animation Council of the Philippines.

The college currently offers three bachelor programs: BS Computer Science, BS Information Technology, and Bachelor of Multimedia Arts.

==== College of Criminal Justice Education ====
In 1979, the College of Arts and Sciences offered the Bachelor of Science in Criminology as one of its academic programs.Three years later in 1982 the College of Criminology was established as a separate college with Prof. Jose B. Maniwang as the first Dean of Criminology. Under his leadership, the College of Criminology was granted recognition on June 18, 1984, by the Department of Education, Culture and Sports pursuant to DECS Order No. 23, s. 1984. In 2016, the college has been hailed as a Center of Excellence in Criminal Justice Education by CHED.

==== College of Education ====
The beginnings of the College of Education can be traced to the time when the Angeles University Foundation, then Angeles Institute of Technology (AIT), was established on May 25, 1962. Four years later, in 1966, the Graduate School was organized. It was conceived primarily as an independent unit with its own Dean and support staff. In 2010, the college has been hailed as a Center of Excellence in Teacher Education by CHED.

==== College of Nursing ====
The College of Nursing started admitting students for preparatory courses leading to the degree in Nursing under the Liberal Arts Department in 1971. The college was given a permit to operate in 1972 and 1973. It was considered a separate unit with a Dean and two Nurse Instructors who supervised its operations. Major subjects were offered to 29 students who passed all requirements leading the third year level. It was granted recognition by the Ministry of Education, Culture and Sports in 1976. The Nursing program was granted Center of Development status by CHED in 2010.

=== Auxiliary units and Research Centers ===
- AUF Cyberspace
- AUF Law Center
- AUF Fitness and Recreation Center
- Center for American Studies
- Center for Christian Formation
- Center for Community Development Services
- Center for Planning, Research and Development
- Confucius Institute at Angeles University Foundation
- Institute of Kapampangan Studies
- International Students Association
- Pathways to Higher Education-Philippines

== Athletics ==
The Angeles University Foundation (AUF) Great Danes are the varsity teams of the Angeles University Foundation. The women's teams are called the Lady Danes, while the Junior's (high school) teams are the Baby Danes. The Great Danes played as a guest team in the 2009–10 season of the National Collegiate Athletic Association (Philippines). The men's basketball team won the 2007 National Inter-Collegiate Basketball Championship held in Ibajay, Aklan. Their victory qualified them for the 6th Asian University Basketball Championship in Daet, Camarines Norte.

The Great Danes are administered under the Fitness, Sports and Recreation Office of Angeles University Foundation. The sports covered by the varsity team include but not limited to basketball, volleyball, chess, swimming, baseball, taekwondo and badminton among others.

Apart from the joining as guest team in Season 85 of NCAA, the AUF Great Danes are also very active in joining regional, provincial and national athletic meets including the Private Schools Athletic Association Games, Father Martin's Cup and the National Inter-Collegiate Basketball Tournament of which AUF is the defending Champion for 2009.
