= Rene Cruz =

Filipino sports administrator

Rene R. Cruz

6th President of the Philippine Olympic Committee
- In office 1993–1996
- Preceded by: Jose Sering
- Succeeded by: Cristy Ramos

Personal details
- Born: 1929 or 1930
- Died: September 29, 2015 (aged 85) Muntinlupa, Philippines

Rene Roque Cruz was a Filipino sports administrator and police official. He served as the president of the Philippine Olympic Committee (POC) from 1993 to 1996.

Prior to being a POC president, Cruz served as vice president in 1989. Under his term as POC President, the Philippines won a silver medal at the 1996 Summer Olympics in Atlanta. The country would have an Olympic medal drought until the 2016 edition. He also served as the head of the Philippine Badminton Association.

Cruz died at the Asian Hospital and Medical Center in Alabang, Muntinlupa due to cardiac arrest on September 29, 2015. He was 85 years old.
