= Skateboarding and Roller Sports Association of the Philippines =

National sports federation of skateboarding in the Philippines

- IOC nation: Philippines
- Sport: Skateboarding, roller sports

Affiliations
- International federation: World Skate
- World Skate member since: 2019
- National Olympic Committee: Philippine Olympic Committee
- Member of NOC since: 2018
- Country: Philippines

The Skateboarding and Roller Sports Association of the Philippines, also known as Skate Pilipinas and SRSAP, is the national sports association responsible for the regulation of skateboarding and roller sports within the Philippines. It is a member of World Skate and is recognized by The Philippine Olympic Committee.

== History ==
=== Early years of skateboarding in the Philippines ===
Skateboarding was introduced in the Philippines in the late 1970s following the popularity boom in the United States. Some Filipino youth purchased imported skateboards and utilized open spaces and parking lots for leisure. Skate bowls emerged from 1980s to the 1980s as the hobby became more prominent. Skateboarders however gained a reputation for being outcasts due to their streetwear attire and sometimes faced confrontations with authorities, partly because they often had no designated places to skate.

Willy Santos emerged as the first known professional skateboarder of Filipino descent during the 1990s who was one of the original members of Tony Hawk's Birdhouse Skateboards.

In the 2010s, the Philippines continued to have inadequate facilities such as dedicated skate parks for skateboarders.

=== Formation of SRSAP ===
The International Olympic Committee approved skateboarding for inclusion in the 2020 Summer Olympics in August 2016, following its proposal by the Tokyo 2020 Organizing Committee. The inclusion was part of an effort to make the Olympic program more appealing to younger audiences and reflect the growing role of urban sports.

The Skateboarding and Roller Sports Association of the Philippines (SRSAP) was later formed with Montecristo Mendigoria as its founding president. The federation is already extant by 2018 with Margielyn Didal having competed under their auspices and won a gold medal in the 2018 Asian Games in Indonesia. In December 2018, SRSAP became an associate member of the Philippine Olympic Committee (POC).

On July 3, 2019, the federation's membership in World Skate was ratified at the organization's General Ordinary Congress in Barcelona, Spain. The SRSAP organized the inaugural Philippine National Skateboarding Championship within the same month, during a period when skateboarding was gaining greater acceptance as a sport.

In December, skateboarding was included for the very first time in the 2019 SEA Games hosted in the Philippines.

== Competitive record ==
Skate Pilipinas' National Park Competition 2024

Downhill Skateboarding and Street Luge World Championship 2024

=== Summer Olympics ===
Games	Athletes	Events	Gold	Silver	Bronze	Total
(Japan) 2020	1	1/4	0	0	0	0
(France) 2024	Did not qualify					
(United States) 2028	Future event					
Total			0	0	0	0

=== Asian Games ===
Games	Athletes	Events	Gold	Silver	Bronze	Total
(Indonesia) 2018	3	2/6	1	0	0	1
(China) 2022	5	4/14	0	0	0	0
(Japan) 2026	Future event					
Total			1	0	0	1
