= Julian Camacho =

Julian G. Camacho (born February 20, 1943) is the current secretary general of the Wushu Federation of the Philippines (WFP), executive board member of the International Wushu Federation, and a former treasurer of the Philippine Olympic Committee (POC). He was served as the chef-de-mission of the Philippine delegation in the 2015 Southeast Asian Games hosted by Singapore.
