= Ricky Vargas =

Ex president of Philippine Olympic Committee

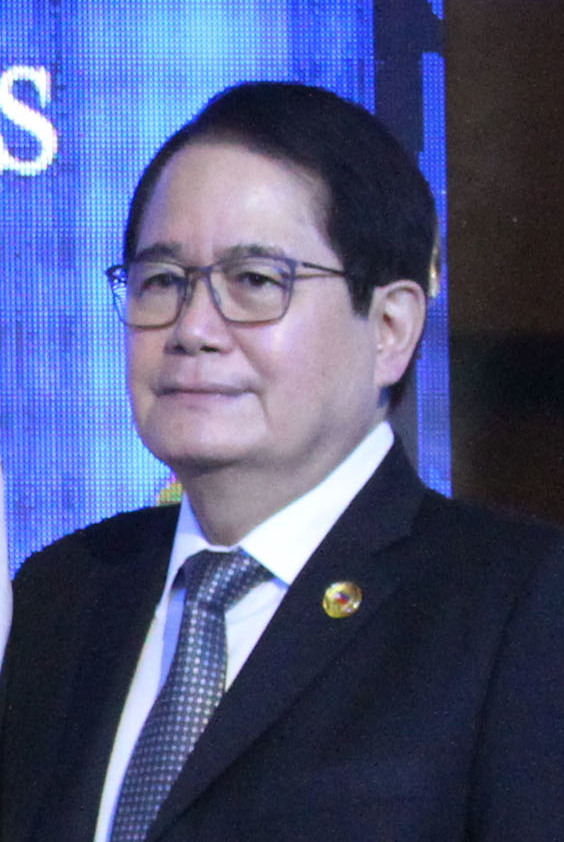
- Vargas in 2018

15th and 26th Chairman
- Incumbent
- Assumed office December 17, 2017
- PBA Team: TNT Tropang Giga
- Preceded by: Mikee Romero
- In office August 20, 2006 – August 19, 2007
- Preceded by: Eliezer Capacio
- Succeeded by: Tony Chua

10th President of the Philippine Olympic Committee
- In office March 5, 2018 – June 18, 2019
- Preceded by: Jose Cojuangco Jr.
- Succeeded by: Joey Romasanta

Personal details
- Born: Victorico P. Vargas; February 24, 1952 (age 74) Philippines
- Relations: Jorge B. Vargas (grandfather)
- Education: University of Santo Tomas

Victorico "Ricky" P. Vargas (born February 24, 1952) is a Filipino executive who served as the 10th President of the Philippine Olympic Committee (POC) from March 5, 2018, after winning over Jose Cojuangco Jr. in a court-ordered elections held on February 23, 2018, until his resignation on June 18, 2019.

He is also the president of the Association of Boxing Alliances in the Philippines (ABAP) and the chairman of the Philippine Basketball Association Board of Governors for the 2017–18 season.

At PLDT, Vargas is currently served as the Head of the company's Business Transformation Group.

== Education ==
Vargas studied at Ateneo de Manila University and the University of Santo Tomas. He is a holder of a bachelor's degree in psychology.

== Career ==
=== Sports administration ===
He served as the Philippine Basketball Association chairman of the board of governors since 2017 representing TNT KaTropa as its team governor, and the president of Association of Boxing Alliances in the Philippines, the NSA for Boxing in the Philippines. He is also the former Vice Chairman of the Samahang Basketbol ng Pilipinas (SBP) until 2016.

==== Philippine Olympic Committee ====
===== Election =====
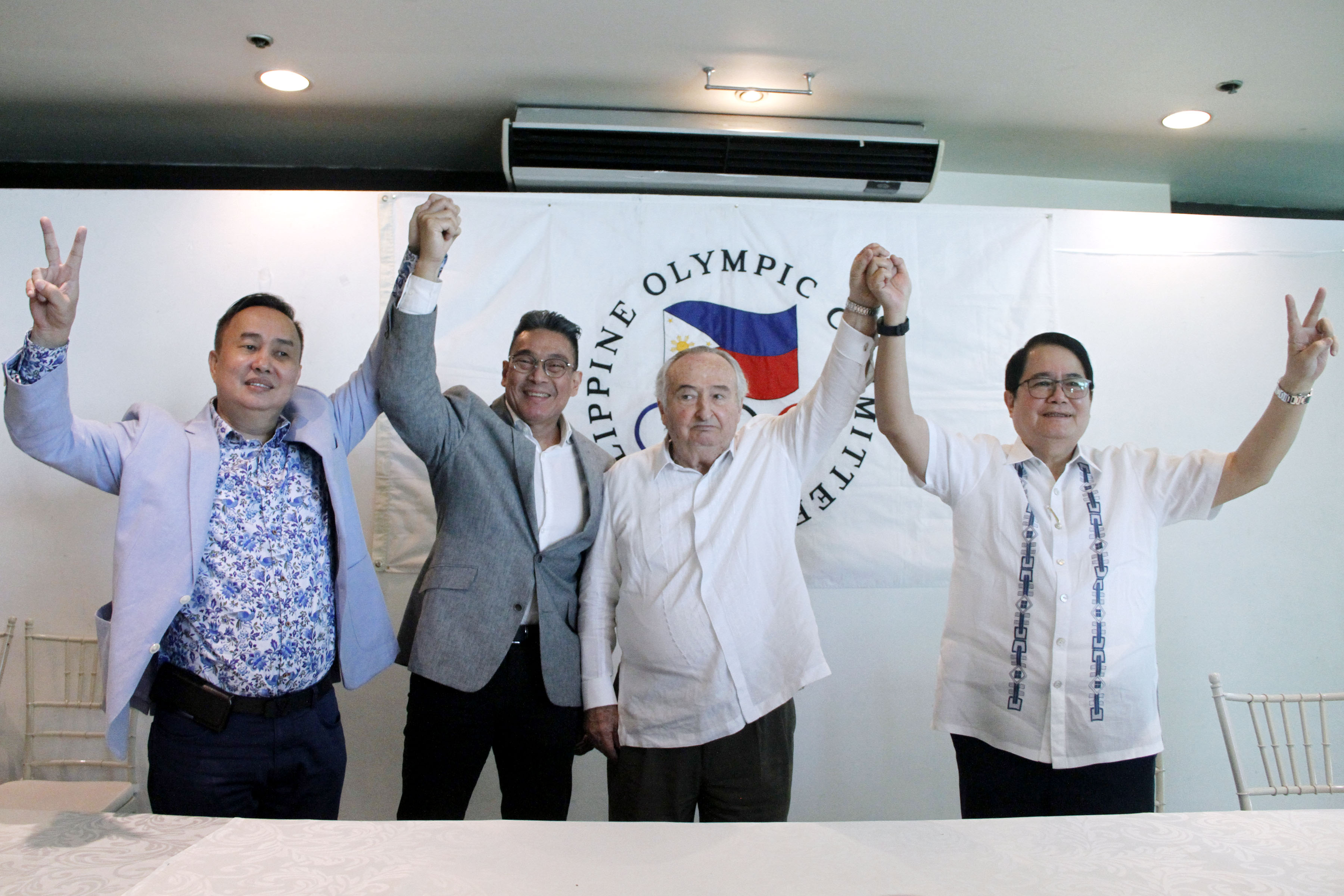
Vargas' election as POC President in February 2018.

Ricky Vargas first attempted to run for the position of Philippine Olympic Committee President in 2016, challenging then incumbent president, Jose "Peping" Cojuangco Jr. However his candidacy, along with Abraham Tolentino's who was vying for chairmanship, for the November 2016 elections were rejected after the sport's body commission on election which was led by Francisco Elizalde ruled them ineligible for being not being "active member". Vargas, who only attended in one general assembly of the POC, argued that being an active member does not equate to physical presence in the POC's general assembly. He attempted to have the November 2016 elections postponed by the Pasig Regional Trial Court to allow for dialogue between his camp and Cojuangco's but failed. Cojuangco secured a fourth term unopposed in the 2016 elections.

The Pasig court later ruled the results of the 2016 elections for the post of president and chairman null and void, said that the commission on elections cannot restrict or qualify the eligibility criteria of being an "active member", and ordered and election with Vargas and Tolentino as candidates to be held on February 23, 2018. An extraordinary meeting was held in February where the general assembly agreed to hold elections and a commissions on elections was formed which was also led by Francisco Elizalde. Given the latter fact, Vargas and Tolentino anticipated that they will be disqualified again though Elizalde allowed the two to run to avoid being cited in contempt by court despite the election head's view that the two are ineligible.

Vargas secured a 24–15 victory over Cojuangco for the post of POC President ending the latter's long tenure. Vargas officially began his term on March 5, 2018, when he took his oath before Philippine President Rodrigo Duterte in the Malacañang Palace. The first board meeting under Vargas' tenure was held the day after where his predecessor turned over the POC flag to Vargas.

===== Tenure =====
Vargas had to work with a POC board, which is a holdover from his predecessor's administration and had to face issues such as continued unsettled leadership disputes within numerous member National Sports Associations, status of some the POC's members, and reform of the POC By-Laws and Constitution. He also became one of the key figures behind the organization of the 2019 Southeast Asian Games.

Almost a year after Vargas' election, Vargas reportedly was not content on the way the POC is being run and was aiming to make the POC as a "more transparent, more honest, and less political organization". He also credits his deputy, Abraham Tolentino for his role in his administration. Vargas has expressed preference to have Tolentino's presence in board meetings noting his experience as a politician.

Vargas' organization of the games was put into question particularly the incorporation of the Philippine SEA Games Organizing Committee (PHISGOC) Foundation as the organizing body of the regional games without prior approval of the POC board. The majority of its members believed the foundation to be a different entity than the ad hoc committee agreed upon by the board in 2017. It was also alleged that there was an overpricing of supplies provided by Asics, the official outfitter for athletes representing the Philippines in the Southeast Asian Games.

There were allegations that there was an effort to remove Vargas from his position as president. His predecessor, Peping Cojuangco is often associated with such but has said he is not interested of the presidency and has expressed support for his administration.

The International Olympic Committee has urged Vargas to meet with the board to address the issues raised against him. Vargas convened a meeting with the board on June 18, 2019 where he filed his resignation as president. He was succeeded by First Vice President Joey Romasanta.

=== World Boxing ===
Vargas as part of the Association of Boxing Alliances in the Philippines (ABAP) has led the organization's transition from the International Boxing Association to the breakaway World Boxing organization as part of a bid to retain boxing in the 2028 Summer Olympics. He was named part of the board for Asian Boxing in December 2024, an organization meant to supplant the Asian Boxing Confederation.

== Personal life ==
He is the grandson of Jorge B. Vargas, who served as president of POC's predecessor, Philippine Amateur Athletic Federation.
