= Association of Boxing Alliances in the Philippines =

Boxing association in Philippines

- Sport: Amateur Boxing
- Abbreviation: ABAP
- Founded: 1961
- Affiliation: International Boxing Association, World Boxing, Philippine Olympic Committee
- Headquarters: Rizal Memorial Sports Complex, P. Ocampo Sr. St., Malate, Manila, Metro Manila
- Location: Philippines
- President: Roberto Puno
- Chairman: Ricky Vargas
- CEO: Manny V. Pangilinan
- Sponsor: PLDT, Smart Communications, Maynilad, MVP Sports Foundation
- (Philippines)

The Association of Boxing Alliances in the Philippines (formerly Amateur Boxing Association of the Philippines until 2013), or ABAP, is the governing body for amateur boxing in the Philippines.

== History ==
Former ABAP logo (until 2013)

=== 1960s–1970s ===
Eugenio Puyat is the first president of the then Amateur Boxing Association of the Philippines (ABAP) in 1961. He served the role up to around the late 1970s.

=== 1980s–1990s ===
In 1986, Roilo Golez became president of ABAP whose mandate was to last until 1990. Golez succeeded Nemesio Yabut.

In October 9. 1987, Golez resigned prompting the ABAP board to hold a vote, which elected Mel Lopez as the new president on October 29. However Golez claimed to have withdrawn his resignation and sought the court to resolve the leadership crisis. The dispute persisted to at least to 1989.

In 1994, Lopez's son Manny succeeded him as ABAP president.

=== 2000s–presemt ===
In 2009, Ricky Vargas took over ABAP succeeding Manny Lopez which also marked the beginning of the involvement of businessman and sports patron Manny V. Pangilinan.

On May 30, 2013, ABAP held a general assembly and organizational elections at the Quezon City Sports Club. ABAP also renamed itself and became the "Association of Boxing Alliances in the Philippines". The name change was mandated by the International Boxing Association, which dropped the word "amateur" in all organizations under its aegis.

In 2023, ABAP joined World Boxing.

== Presidents ==
- Eugenio Puyat (1961–1970s)
- Nemesio Yabut (?–1986)
- Roilo Golez (1986–1987)
- Mel Lopez (1987–1996)
- Manny Lopez (1996–2009)
- Ricky Vargas (2009–2021)
- Ed Picson (2021–2023)
- Roberto Puno (2023–)

== See also ==
- Philippines national amateur boxing athletes
