= National Chess Federation of the Philippines =

Philippines governing body for chess

- Sport: Chess
- Abbreviation: NCFP
- Affiliation: FIDE
- Regional affiliation: Asian Chess Federation
- President: Prospero Pichay

The National Chess Federation of the Philippines (NCFP) is the governing chess organization in the Philippines. It is a non-profit organization and a member of the Fédération Internationale des Échecs and part of the Philippine Olympic Committee.

== See also ==
- Shell National Youth Active Chess Championship
- Department of Education (Philippines)
- Philippine Olympic Committee
- Philippine Sports Commission
