= Cynthia Carrion =

Filipino sports executive and government official

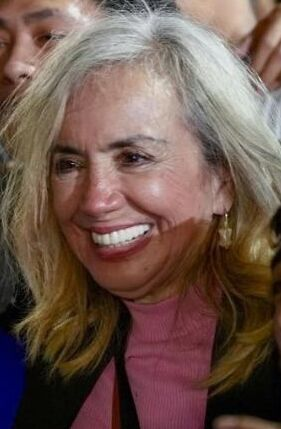
- Carrion in 2024
- Born: Cynthia Lagdameo Carrion; August 19, 1948 (age 78)
- Other name: Cynthia Carrion-Norton
- Occupations: Sports executive, government official
- Known for: President of Gymnastics Association of the Philippines
- Partner: Jerry Rollin (died 2026)
- Children: 2

Cynthia Lagdameo Carrion, also known as Cynthia Carrion-Norton, is a Filipino sports executive and government official who is the president of the Gymnastics Association of the Philippines.

== Early life and education ==
Cynthia Carrion was born on August 19, 1948. She attended the Assumption Convent for her secondary education with future president Gloria Macapagal Arroyo as one of her classmates. Carrion had multiple offers for a role in the Philippine entertainment but her parents did not allow her who gave emphasis on the importance of studies, sports, ballet and playing the piano. She graduated at the Murdoch University.

== Career ==
=== Government ===
Carrion was made a commissioner at the Philippine Sports Commission (PSC) by president Gloria Macapagal Arroyo in 2001 despite her preference for a role involving tourism. She started various women and sports programs as part of the PSC. In early 2002, internal dispute occur in prompting Carrion to request Arroyo to transfer her to a role within the Department of Tourism (DOT).

Carrion was undersecretary for sports and wellness with the DOT from 2003 to 2010 during President Arroyo's tenure. She promoted sports tourism in the Philippines as part of her role. She was also the executive director of the Philippine Commission on Sports Scuba Diving

She is also the general manager of the Philippine Retirement Authority since 2020.

=== Private sector ===
She was president of the Philippine International Competitive Aerobics Federation.

Carrion became the president of the Gymnastics Association of the Philippines in 2007. Carrion notably scouted Carlos Yulo as a seven years old and her sports federation raised funds for his training. Yulo went on to become a dual gold medalist for the Philippines at the 2024 Summer Olympics in Paris.

She was the chef de mission of the Philippine delegate to the 2017 SEA Games.

== Personal life ==
Carrion was previously married to a man from the Norton family with whom she had two children. She then married Jerry Rollin who later died due to cancer in September 2026.

She was also a physical fitness instructress to former president Gloria Macapagal Arroyo.
