= Philippine Olympic Committee =

National Olympic Committee

- Country: Philippines
- Code: PHI
- Created: 1911 (Note: As the Philippine Amateur Athletic Federation (PAAF))
- Recognized: 1929
- Continental Association: OCA
- Headquarters: PhilSports Complex, Pasig, Metro Manila
- President: Abraham Tolentino
- Secretary General: Wharton Chan
- Website: www.olympic.ph

The Philippine Olympic Committee Inc. (POC) is the National Olympic Committee of the Philippines.

The POC is a private, non-governmental organization composed of and serve as the mother organization of all National Sports Associations (NSAs) in the Philippines. It is recognized by the International Olympic Committee (IOC) as having the sole authority for representation of the Philippines in the Olympic Games, the Asian Games, the Southeast Asian Games and other multi-event competitions.

The POC is financially independent and does not receive any subsidy from government, though its member NSAs receive some financial assistance from the Philippine Sports Commission. Instead, the POC supports its own activities with funds generated from sponsorships, licensing fees on the use of the Olympic marks, IOC subsidy and proceeds from special projects and donations.

== History ==
The Philippine Amateur Athletic Federation was the governing body of sports in the Philippines and the predecessor of the Philippine Olympic Committee.

Logo of the Philippine Olympic Committee until 2018.

The Philippine Amateur Athletic Federation was organized in a permanent basis in 1911 as a result of the gaining of foothold of athletics in the Philippine Islands which was caused by Organized sports was first introduced in the Philippines during the American administration of the islands with the establishment of the Philippine Amateur Athletic Federation (PAAF) in January 1911. The PAAF organized the inaugural Far Eastern Championship Games in 1913 which was contested by China, Japan, and the host country, Philippines.

The first Filipino Olympian was David Nepomuceno, who participated in Athletics in the 100m and 200m sprints events at the 1924 Summer Olympics in Paris. However, it was only in 1929 when the International Olympic Committee recognized the PAAF as the Philippines' National Olympic Committee. The recognition was a year after swimmer Teofilo Yldefonso won the Philippines' first Olympic medal—a bronze in the 200 meters breaststroke event at the 1928 Summer Olympics in Amsterdam. In 1975 the PAAF was renamed to Philippine Olympic Committee (POC) after the establishment of the Department of Youth and Sports Development which effectively abolished the former.

The Philippine Olympic Committee has held office along with the Philippine Sports Commission at the Rizal Memorial Sports Complex until the construction of the PhilSports Complex which became the headquarters of the two organizations.

In January 2023, amendments on leadership and composition of member national sports associations of the POC took effect.

== Governance ==
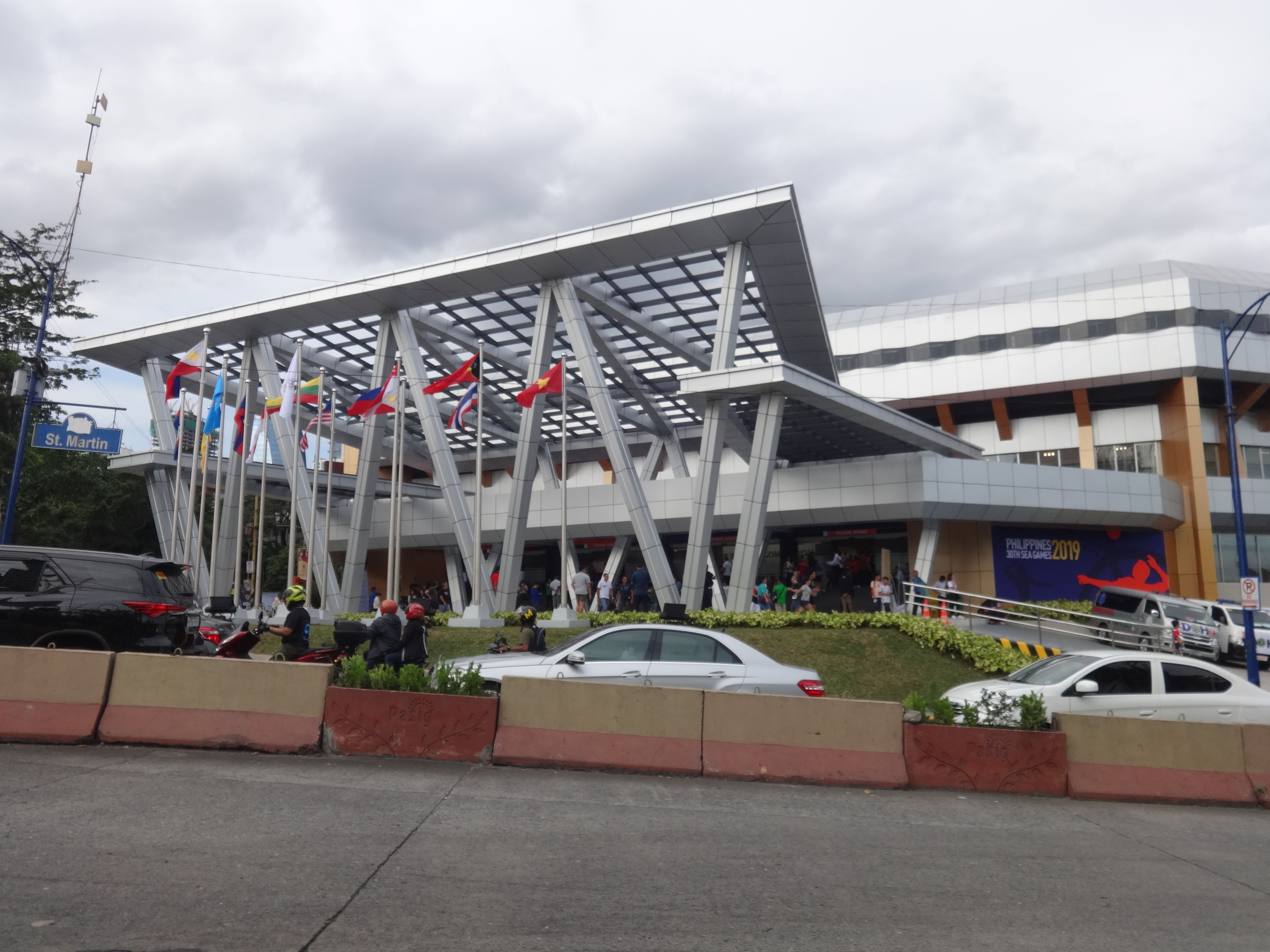
The PhilSports Complex serves as the headquarters of the POC as mandated by the sports body's by-laws. It could be transferred through a decision in a General Assembly.

=== Executive board ===
The Philippine Olympic Committee is governed by its executive board, which composes the chairman, president, first and second vice president, secretary general, treasurer, auditor and the immediate past president. The executive board is also joined by four members elected by the board members and any IOC members present in the country. The executive board holds at least one meeting every month and makes valid acts if majority of its members are present which is seven or more person in all cases. Decisions by the POC are voted upon by the members of the executive board and in case of a tie, the chairman decides upon the matter concerned.

Commissions or committees are also organized by the POC. The Membership, Arbitration, Ethics, Technical, Ways and Means and Athlete's Commissions are the standing commissions of the POC. The creation of additional commissions are subject to approval by the executive board upon recommendation by the President.

Designation	Name	Sport
Chairman	Steve Hontiveros	Handball
President	Abraham Tolentino	Cycling
Secretary General	Wharton Chan	Kickboxing
Vice Presidents	Al Panlilio	Basketball
Vice Presidents	Richard Gomez	Fencing
Treasurer	Cynthia Carrion	Gymnastics
Auditor	Joaquin Loyzaga	Baseball
Board members	David F. Carter	Judo
Board members	Pearl Anne Managuelod	Muay Thai
Board members	Jose Raul Canlas	Surfing
Board members	Charlie L. Ho	Netball
Immediate Past President	Victorico Vargas	Boxing
Athletes' Commission	Nikko Huelgas	Triathlon
Membership Committee Chair	Avelino Sumagui	Cycling

=== President ===
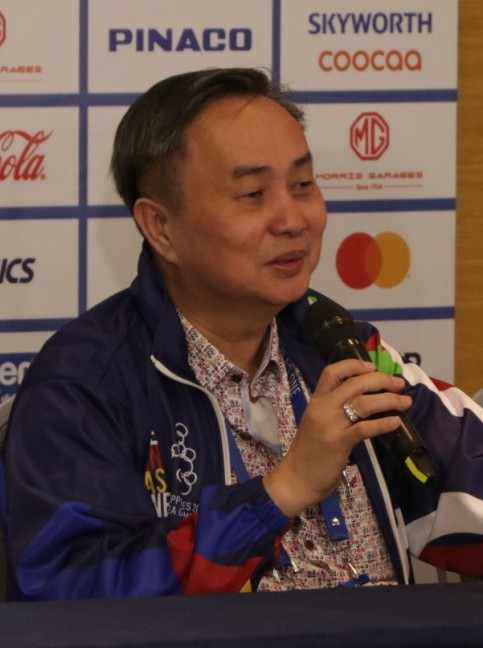
Abraham Tolentino, the president of the POC since July 28, 2019.

Ambrosio Padilla was the first president of the Philippine Olympic Committee (POC) serving from 1975 to 1976. Previously he served as president of the POC's predecessor, the Philippine Amateur Athletic Federation from 1970 to 1975.

The president has the power to call a special meeting of the executive board upon a written request addressed to the secretary general. This privilege can also be invoke by the majority of the executive board. The president also recommends the creation of a new commission within the POC, as well as the appointment of each of the commission's chairman and members, and its duties, tasks, and authorities, all subject to the approval of the board.

Philippine Amateur Athletic Federation

- William Cameron Forbes (1911–1916)
- Manuel L. Quezon (1916–1935)
- Jorge B. Vargas (1936–1955)
- Antonio de las Alas (1956–1968)
- Felipe Monserrat (1969–1970)
- Ambrosio Padilla (1970–1975)

Philippine Olympic Committee

- Ambrosio Padilla (1975–1976)
- Nereo Andolong (1977–1980)
- Julian Malonso (1980; provisional)
- Michael Keon (1981–1984)
- Jose Sering (1985–1992)
- Rene Cruz (1993–1996)
- Cristy Ramos (1997–1999)
- Celso Dayrit (1999–2004)
- Jose Cojuangco Jr. (2005–2018)
- Victorico Vargas (2018–2019)
- Joey Romasanta (2019)
- Abraham Tolentino (2019–present)

=== International Olympic Committee members ===
- Jorge Bartolomé Vargas (1936–1985)
- Francisco José Elizalde (1985–2012)
- Mikaela Cojuangco Jaworski (2013–present)

== Members ==
Sports associations that are members of the Philippine Olympic Committee are recognized as National Sports Associations (NSAs). There are two levels of memberships within the POC which is regular and associate. The POC also gives accreditation to recognize disciplines of sports.

=== Regular members ===
National Federation	Founded	Summer or Winter	Headquarters
World Archery Philippines	1961	Summer	Quezon City, Metro Manila
Philippine Athletics	1962	Summer	Manila
Philippine Badminton Association	1952	Summer	Pasig, Metro Manila
Philippine Amateur Baseball Association	1954	Summer	Manila
Samahang Basketbol ng Pilipinas	2006	Summer	Pasig, Metro Manila
Billiard Sports Confederation of the Philippines	1987	Non Olympic	Manila
Philippine Bowling Federation	2016	Non Olympic	Taguig, Metro Manila
Association of Boxing Alliances in the Philippines	1977	Summer	Manila
Philippine Canoe-Kayak Federation	No info	Summer	Taytay, Rizal
National Chess Federation of the Philippines	2000	Summer	Pasig, Metro Manila
Integrated Cycling Federation of the Philippines	No info	Summer	Tagaytay, Cavite
Philippine Dancesport Federation	2007	Non Olympic	Pasig, Metro Manila
Philippine Esports Organization	2011	Non Olympic	Mandaluyong, Metro Manila
Equestrian Association of the Philippines	No info	Summer	Makati, Metro Manila
Philippine Fencing Association	1957	Summer	Pasig, Metro Manila
Philippine Football Federation	1907	Summer	Pasig, Metro Manila
National Golf Association of the Philippines	1961	Summer	Pasig, Metro Manila
Gymnastics Association of the Philippines	1962	Summer	Manila
Philippine Handball Federation	1990	Summer	Pasig, Metro Manila
Philippine Hockey Association	2015	Summer	Pasig, Metro Manila
Federation of Ice Hockey League	2015	Winter	Quezon City, Metro Manila
Philippine Skating Union	2004	Winter	Mandaluyong, Metro Manila
Ju-Jitsu Federation of the Philippines	2015	Non Olympic	Makati, Metro Manila
Philippine Judo Federation	No info	Summer	Manila
Karate Pilipinas Sports Federation	No info	Summer	Pasig, Metro Manila
Samahang Kickboxing ng Pilipinas	No info	Summer	Pasay, Metro Manila
Kurash Sports Federation of the Philippines	No info	Non Olympic	Manila
Philippine Lawn Bowls Association	No info	Non Olympic	Angeles City, Pampanga
Philippine Modern Pentathlon Association	No info	Summer	Mandaluyong, Metro Manila
Muaythai Association of the Philippines	No info	Non Olympic	Pasig, Metro Manila
Philippine Netball Federation	2014	Non Olympic	Metro Manila
Philsilat Sports Association	2014	Non Olympic	Manila
Philippine Rowing Association	No info	Summer	Quezon City, Metro Manila
Philippine Rugby Football Union	1998	Summer	Mandaluyong, Metro Manila
Philippine Sailing Association	No info	Summer	Makati, Metro Manila
Pilipinas Sambo Federation	2015	Non Olympic	Davao City, Davao del Sur
Pilipinas Sepak Takraw Association	No info	Non Olympic	Pasig, Metro Manila
Philippine National Shooting Association	No info	Summer	Pasig, Metro Manila
Skateboarding and Roller Sports Association of the Philippines	No info	Summer	Bacoor, Cavite
Philippine Ski and Snowboard Federation	No info	Winter	Bellflower, California
Philippine Soft Tennis Association	No info	Summer	Las Piñas, Metro Manila
Amateur Softball Association of the Philippines	No info	Summer	Makati, Metro Manila
United Philippines Surfing Association	No info	Summer	Makati, Metro Manila
Philippine Squash Academy	2014	Summer	Makati, Metro Manila
Philippine Aquatics	2023	Summer	Pasig, Metro Manila
Philippine Table Tennis Federation	1951	Summer	Manila
Philippine Taekwondo Association	1976	Summer	Manila
Philippine Tennis Association	1920	Summer	Manila
Philippine Tournament Bridge Association	2000	Non Olympic	Makati, Metro Manila
Triathlon Association of the Philippines	No info	Summer	Pasig, Metro Manila
Philippine National Volleyball Federation	2021	Summer	Taguig, Metro Manila
Samahang Weightlifting ng Pilipinas	No info	Summer	Manila
Wrestling Association of the Philippines	No info	Summer	Manila
Wushu Federation of the Philippines	1987	Non Olympic	Manila

=== Associate members ===
- 3D Air Sports and Hobbies Associations
- Philippine Cricket Association
- Philippine Duckpin Bowling Council
- Philippine Eskrima Kali Arnis Federation
- Philippine National Federation of Polo Players
- Philippine Underwater Hockey Confederation
- Pilipinas Obstacle Sports Federation
- Powerlifting Association of the Philippines
- Vovinam Philippines

=== Recognized members ===
- American Tackle Football Federation of the Philippines
- Automobile Association Philippines
- Curling Winter Sports Association of the Philippines (Curling Pilipinas)
- National Motorcycle Sports and Safety Association of the Philippines
- Philippine Finswimming Federation
- Philippine Floorball Association
- Philippine National Rugby League
- Philippine Pole & Aerial Sports Association
- Philippine Windsurfing Association
- Tchoukball Association of the Philippines
- Wakeboard and Waterski Association of the Philippines
- World Sikaran Arnis Brotherhood of the Philippines

=== Membership ===
==== Application process ====
Since February 2009, applicant National Sports Associations should have an official address and contact numbers (telephone, fax, email address) or official website and a directory of its officers and members, and a board resolution authorizing the signatory officer to apply for POC membership with an indication of the level of membership. Also it is required that a certificate of membership with the pertinent International Federation recognized by the International Olympic Committee which governs the sport of the applicant internationally to be submitted to the POC, unless the International Federation requires its members first to gain recognition from their National Olympic Committees. International Federation membership is required for regular membership. A notarized affidavit is also to be submitted which states that the applicant sports association is the only legitimate and governing body of their sport in the national level with the POC.

The prospect national sports association should also have organized at least two annual National Championships and present documenting evidences to the POC which includes duly certified applicants, results, photos, and relevant press releases. It is also required that articles be published in three major daily newspapers of general circulation which states that the applicant is seeking POC membership. A copy of the publication, as well as an affidavit of publication from the newspapers concerned to be presented to the POC. If there are many other sports bodies claiming to represent the same sport of the applicant in the Philippines, an objection to the application for membership of the applicant sports association must be presented before the POC Membership Commission within fifteen days from the date of publication.

The a POC Membership Commission gives recommendations to the POC following the complete submission of required documents for applications. The POC membership of applicant associations is subject to approval of the POC General Assembly upon the recommendation by the Membership Commission. If the regular or associate membership of the applicant is approved by the POC, the nature of the membership shall be provisional for one year pending a review of the association's performance in national and international levels.

The applicant's NSA President as a POC member should not be an incumbent member.

==== Suspension ====
A member of the POC could be suspended or expelled from the National Olympic Committee by 3/4 vote of the POC General Assembly.

In 2005, the Basketball Association of the Philippines (BAP), which was founded in 1936, was expelled from the committee after disputes between BAP and POC over the latter's leadership. It was replaced by the Samahang Basketbol ng Pilipinas.

The Philippine Karatedo Federation also lost its POC membership in 2018 after the World Karate Federation stripped its recognition in April 2018. It was replaced by Karate Pilipinas. The POC recognition for Philippine Swimming as the national sports association for all aquatic sports was revoked and transferred to newly founded Philippine Aquatics in 2023 after the former was stripped of recognition from the World Aquatics because of governance issue.

Philippine Volleyball Federation was revoked recognition in 2015 due leadership crisis, it was temporarily replaced by Larong Volleyball sa Pilipinas, until the Philippine National Volleyball Federation was founded in 2021. In 2016, the POC revoked Philippine Bowling Congress' membership due to legal issues. It was replaced by Philippine Bowling Federation. Arnis Philippines was replaced by Philippine Eskrima Kali Arnis Federation in 2017.

The Philippine Dragon Boat Federation withdrawn its membership at the POC due to POC and PSC intervention to the IDBF.

== See also ==
- 2016 and 2018 Philippine Olympic Committee elections
- Philippine Sports Commission
- Project Gintong Alay
