= Muaythai Association of the Philippines =

The Muaythai Association of the Philippines is the national governing body for Muay Thai in the Philippines. It is accredited by the World Muaythai Council which is the governing body for the sport of Muay Thai in the world. member of International Federation of Muaythai Associations.
