= Pilipinas Sepak Takraw Association =

The Pilipinas Sepak Takraw Association is the national governing body for Sepak Takraw in the Philippines. It is accredited by the International Sepaktakraw Federation which is the governing body for the sport of Sepak Takraw in the world.
