= Philippine Table Tennis Federation =

Sports governing body in the Philippines

- Sport: Table Tennis
- Abbreviation: PTTFI
- Founded: 1951
- Affiliation: International Table Tennis Federation
- Affiliation date: 1951
- President: Ting Ledesma
- Chairman: Atty. Domingo Panlilio

Official website
- www.facebook.com/philtabletennisfederationinc/
- (Philippines)

The Philippine Table Tennis Federation, Inc. (PTTFI) is the national governing body for table tennis in the Philippines. It is recognised by the Philippine Olympic Committee, Southeast Asian Table Tennis Association, the Asia Table Tennis Union, and the International Table Tennis Federation.

== History ==
The Table Tennis Association of the Philippines(TATAP) was formed in 1951 as a governing body for table tennis in the Philippines. In 2016, the Philippines Olympic Committee(POC) defunct TATAP as member of the National Sports Association(NSA). Philippine Table Tennis Federation, Inc.(PTTFI) replaced TATAP, which was later certified as a regular member of POC and the recognise by NSA as the sole governing body for table tennis.

== Tournaments hosted ==
Year	Tournament	Location
1957	Asian Table Tennis Championships	Manila
1963	Asian Table Tennis Championships	Manila
2014	GAC Group ITTF World Tour Philippine Open Challenge Series	Subic Bay, Olongapo city
2015	GAC Group ITTF World Tour Philippine Open Challenge Series	Subic Bay, Olongapo city

== Athletes ==
=== Olympics ===
Ian Lariba is the first Filipino table tennis player to compete at the Olympic Games.

Tournament	Athlete	Event
2016 Olympics Rio de Janeiro	Ian Lariba	Women's singles

=== Paralympics ===
Josephine Medina is the first Filipino table tennis player to compete at the Paralympics Game, 2012. She also became the first Filipino table tennis player to earn a medal in Paralympics, 2016.

Tournament	Athlete	Event	Medal
2012 Paralympics London	Josephine Medina	Singles class 8	4
2016 Paralympics Rio de Janeiro	Josephine Medina	Singles class 8	3rd place, bronze medalist(s)

=== SEA Games ===
Richard Gonzales is a multiple medalist at the Southeast Asian Games in Table Tennis.

- Singles: (silver) (2005, 2015), (bronze) (1999, 2009, 2013, 2017, 2019)
- Doubles: (bronze) (2011)
- Team: (bronze) (2005)
