= Gymnastics Association of the Philippines =

Governing body of gymnastics in the Philippines

- Sport: Gymnastics
- Jurisdiction: Philippines
- Abbreviation: GAP
- Founded: 1962
- Affiliation: International Gymnastics Federation (FIG)
- Affiliation date: 1963
- Headquarters: Manila, Philippines
- President: Cynthia Carrion

Official website
- philippinegymnastics.com/home
- (Philippines)

The Gymnastics Association of the Philippines (GAP) or simply Gymnastics Philippines is the governing body of gymnastics in the Philippines. The sporting body is a member of the Philippine Olympic Committee and recognized by the Philippine Sports Commission. It is also a member of the Fédération Internationale de Gymnastique and the Asian Gymnastics Union.

== History ==
GAP was established in 1962 with Julian Malonzo as its inaugural president. It became affiliated with the International Gymnastics Federation (FIG) the following year.

The organization appealed to FIG to allow its gymnast to compete in the Summer Olympics. Filipino gymnasts debuted at the 1964 Summer Olympics in Tokyo.

GAP recognized aerobic gymnastics and the cheerleading as disciplines under its jurisdiction in 2003 and 2011 respectively.

GAP was recognized as the National Sports Association of the Year at the 2025 Philippine Sportswriters Association Awards.

== Presidents ==
- Emmanuel Angeles (1986–1990)
- Cynthia Carrion (2007–present)
