= Equestrian Association of the Philippines =

- Sport: Equestrianism
- Abbreviation: EAP
- Affiliation: International Equestrian Federation, Philippine Olympic Committee
- Headquarters: Makati, Metro Manila
- Location: Philippines
- President: Xavier Virata
- Secretary: Steven Virata

Official website
- equestrianphilippines.com
- (Philippines)

The Equestrian Association of the Philippines (EAP) is the national governing body for equestrian sports in the Philippines.
