= Francisco Elizalde =

Filipino sports official

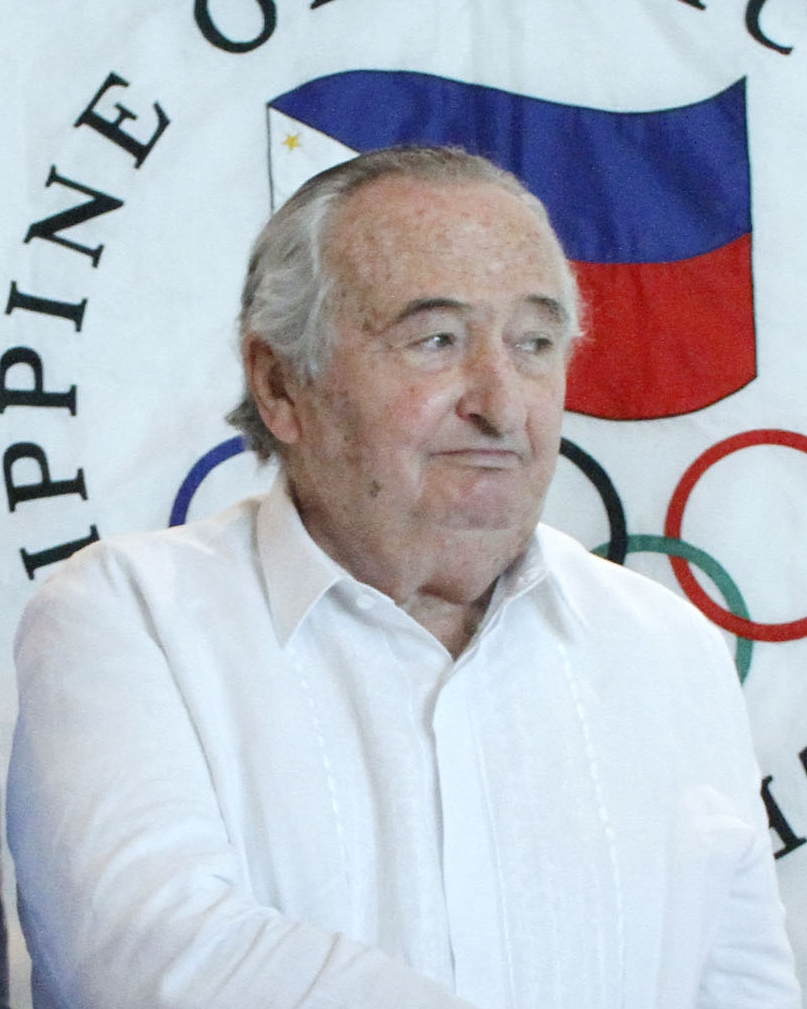
- Elizalde in 2018

President of the Philippine Football Federation
- In office 1982–1986

Personal details
- Born: Francisco José Elizalde e Yturralde; October 10, 1932 (age 93) Philippine Commonwealth

Francisco José Elizalde (born October 10, 1932) is a Filipino sports official. He was a member of the International Olympic Committee representing the Philippines. He was elected by the committee in 1985, filling a post left vacant with the death of Jorge B. Vargas in 1980. He was a member of the Executive board in the 2005 Southeast Asian Games Organizing Committee.

== Early life and education ==
Elizalde was born in San Sebastian, Spain on October 10, 1932. He entered the Staunton Military Academy in the United States in his eight grade and graduated from the academy in 1950. He attended Harvard University from 1950 to 1954. He was the manager of the university's swimming varsity team in his last two years with Harvard.

== Career ==
=== Business ===
Elizalde is the Chairman of Elro Commercial and Industrial Corporation; Vice-President and Director of Elizalde & Company, Inc. He was also involved with Elizalde International (Phil.) Inc., Elizalde Paint Oil Factory Inc., Elizalde Rope Factory Inc., Elizalde Security Equipment Mfg. Corp., Tanduay Distillery Inc. From 1955 to 1983, he was a Director at Johnson-Pickett Rope Co. Inc. and Mineral Exploration & Development Company. From 1983 to 1986, he was a Director of Bais Tanjay Sugar Planters’ Association.

=== Sports administration ===
==== Philippines ====
Elizalde has been part of the board of the Philippine Olympic Committee (POC) since 1982 and was chairman of the POC Ethics Committee. He has also led the Philippine Football Federation as its Vice President from 1980 to 1981 and its President from 1982 to 1986. He was also involved in the organization of two editions of the Southeast Asian Games both of which hosted by the Philippines. He was the President of the Football Committee of the 1981 Southeast Asian Games, and was the Executive Board Member of the Organizing Committee for the 2005 edition.

==== International Olympic Committee ====
Elizalde held posts at the International Olympic Committee. From 1985 to 2012, he was a member of the IOC representing the Philippines and was also the Chairman of the Nominations Commission from 2003 to 2014. He was also a member of various Commission of the IOC.
