= Joey Romasanta =

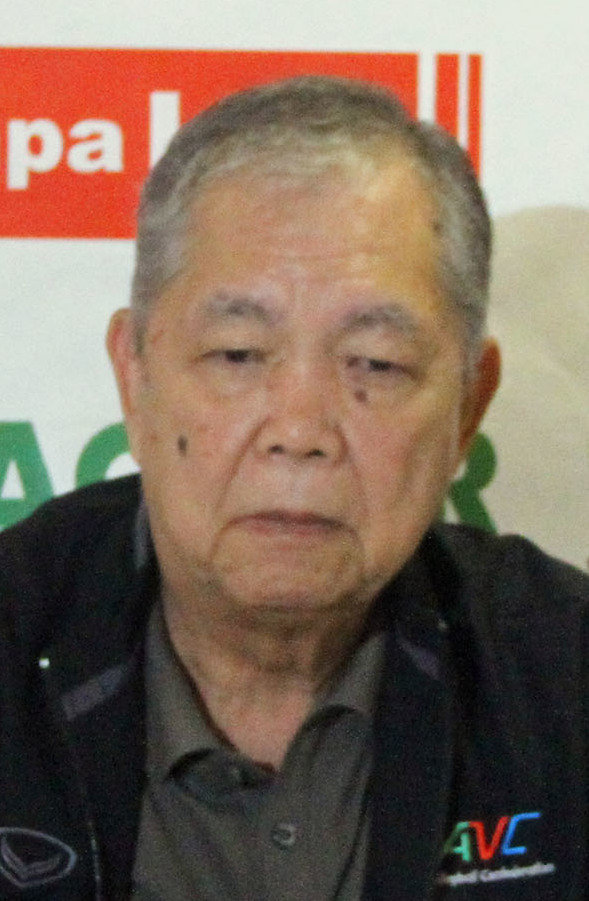
- Romasanta in 2018

11th President of the Philippine Olympic Committee
- In office June 18, 2019 – July 28, 2019
- Preceded by: Ricky Vargas
- Succeeded by: Abraham Tolentino

Personal details
- Born: Jose A. Romasanta; August 26, 1944 (age 81) Philippines

Jose A. "Joey" Romasanta (born August 26, 1944) was the 11th president of the Philippine Olympic Committee (POC), the country's highest Olympic body. He is also the president of Larong Volleyball sa Pilipinas, Inc. (LVPI), the official NSA for Volleyball in the Philippines that is currently recognized by the POC, Asian Volleyball Confederation (AVC) and the International Volleyball Federation (FIVB) and the Philippine Karatedo Federation (PKF-NSA), the official NSA for karatedo.

Aside from that, he was also appointed as part of the 20-man board of AVC representing the Southeastern Asia area and the current member of the executive committee of the SEA Games Federation.

He was also the Chef-De-Mission for the Filipino delegation of athletes in the 2016 Summer Olympics held in Rio de Janeiro, Brazil in 2016.

Romasanta was president of the Amateur Softball Association of the Philippines (ASAP) and the Philippine Karatedo Federation (PKF) (resigned March 2015), team manager of the Luisita Golf team, Vice President for Corporate Affairs of the José Cojuangco & Sons Group of Companies and the Executive Director of Project Gintong Alay during post-EDSA revolution years (1987-1990).
