= Philippine Karatedo Federation =

Governing body of karate in the Philippines

Philippine Karatedo Federation N.S.A.
- Sport: Karate
- Abbreviation: PKF-NSA
- President: Joey Romasanta
- Secretary: Emerson Balbin

Official website
- www.philippinekaratedo.com
- (Philippines)

The Philippine Karatedo Federation N.S.A., Inc. (PKF-NSA) is the governing body claiming jurisdiction over the sport of karate in the Philippines.

== Background ==
The Philippine Karatedo Federation was a member of the World Karate Federation until April 2018 when the world body withdrew recognition amidst allegation of misappropriation of funds allocated for the karate delegation which competed at the 2017 Southeast Asian Games. However the PFK-NSA is given an opportunity to discuss the recognition withdrawal at the November 2018 WKF Congress.

The Philippine Sports Commission in response to the recognition withdrawal revoked its support for the national karate association while the Philippine Olympic Committee maintained that the PKF-NSA is still a member. The POC took over the training and selection process of national karate athletes with former Karate coach Jobet Morales as overseer.

== President ==
POC 1st Vice President Joey Romasanta was president until he resigned from the board and was appointed as the president of Larong Volleyball sa Pilipinas, Inc. in March 2015. He was re-elected in the same position in October 2016.

== See also ==
- Philippine Olympic Committee
- Asian Karatedo Championships
