= Peping Cojuangco =

Filipino politician and sports administrator (born 1934)

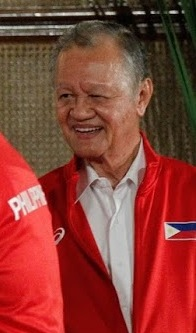
- Cojuangco in 2016

9th President of the Philippine Olympic Committee
- In office January 2005 – March 5, 2018
- Preceded by: Celso Dayrit
- Succeeded by: Victorico P. Vargas

Member of the Philippine House of Representatives from Tarlac's 1st district
- In office June 30, 1987 – June 30, 1998
- Preceded by: District recreated Post last held by Danding Cojuangco
- Succeeded by: Gilbert Teodoro
- In office December 30, 1961 – December 30, 1969
- Preceded by: Jose Roy
- Succeeded by: Danding Cojuangco

Personal details
- Born: José Sumulong Cojuangco Jr. September 19, 1934 (age 92) Intramuros, Manila, Philippine Islands
- Party: Independent (2015–present)
- Other political affiliations: PDP–Laban (1983–1988; 2009–2015); Lakas (2008–2009); Nacionalista (1955–1965); Liberal (1965–1978); Laban (1978–1983); LDP (1988–1997); KAMPI (1997–2008)
- Spouse: Margarita de los Reyes (m. 1962)
- Relations: Juan Sumulong (grandfather); Lorenzo Sumulong (uncle); Victor Sumulong (first cousin); Francisco Sumulong (uncle); Robert Jaworski Jr. (son-in-law)
- Children: 5, including Mikee
- Relatives: Cojuangco family
- Education: College of the Holy Cross (BA)

José "Peping" Sumulong Cojuangco Jr. (born September 19, 1934) is a Filipino politician, sports administrator, and businessman. He served as the 9th president of the Philippine Olympic Committee (POC) from 2004 to 2018. He previously served as the Representative of Tarlac's 1st district from 1961 to 1969 and 1987 to 1998. He began his political career in Paniqui, Tarlac where he served as councilor, vice mayor, and then mayor. A member of the Cojuangco political dynasty, President Corazon Cojuangco Aquino was his sister and President Benigno Aquino III was his nephew.

== Early life and education ==
Cojuangco was born on September 19, 1934, to José Cojuangco Sr. and Demetria Sumulong. He graduated from the College of the Holy Cross in Worcester, Massachusetts, in 1955.

== Political career ==
=== Local government official in Paniqui, Tarlac ===
Cojuangco served as a member of the municipal council of Paniqui, Tarlac from 1955 to 1957. He became Vice Mayor of the same town in 1957 and served the term until 1959. Cojuangco was elected as Mayor of Paniqui in 1959 and served until 1961.

=== Congressman (1960s) ===
In 1961, Cojuangco was elected as a Member of the Philippine House of Representatives representing the First District of the province of Tarlac. At the time, he was the youngest member of the House of Representatives. He was also part of the Commission on Appointments. During the tenure of President Diosdado Macapagal, he was named part of a 12-member select committee which was tasked to draft and pass the first Land Reform Code of the Philippines. Cojuangco was also responsible for the Agriculture Marketing News Services Law which he authored. While a congressman, Cojuangco also served as Vice-Chairman of the Committee on Agriculture, a ranking member of the Committee on Economic Development and served at the Philippine Amateur Athletic Association as a representative from the House of Representatives.

Cojuangco secured a second term as a congressman after he was re-elected to the post in 1965. During his second term he became a member of the Young Turks in the House of Representatives. He served as chairman until 1969.

=== LABAN and PDP–Laban ===
Cojuangco became the campaign manager for the LABAN party which was led by then Senator Benigno Aquino Jr. for the Philippine parliamentary elections in 1978. In 1983, Cojuangco was elected as Secretary-General of PDP–Laban, and a year later as the party's president. He once again served as a campaign manager but this time for the presidential campaign of Corazon Aquino at the 1986 Philippine presidential election. After the controversial election, he joined as a leader of the side that called for President Ferdinand Marcos' ouster at the 1986 People Power Revolution.

=== Congressman (1980s–1990s) ===
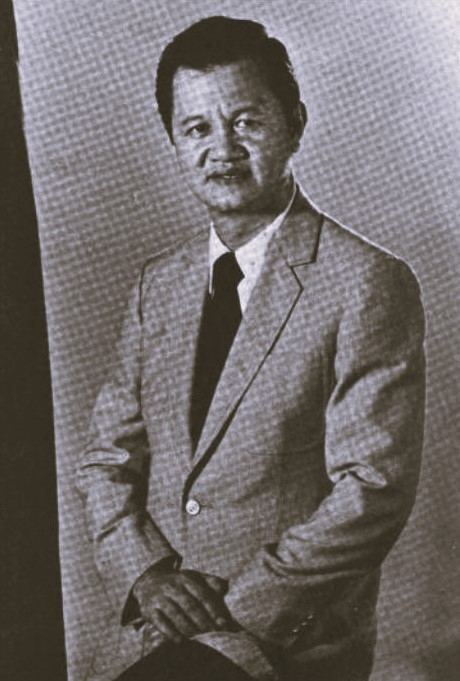
Cojuangco official portrait during the 8th Congress.

In 1989 to 1992, Cojuangco served as an elected Secretary-General of Laban ng Demokratikong Pilipino. In 1987, Cojuangco was elected again as a member of the House of Representatives from Tarlac's First District and won re-election in 1992 and 1995. He served the post until 1998. During the 8th Congress, Cojuangco served as an elected Chairman of the Committee on Agriculture and later the chairman of the Committee on Public Order and Security. He was also then a part of the Committee on Economic Affairs and Foreign Relations as a ranking member. Cojuangco was also the principal author of the Department of the Interior and Local Government Act of 1990 which established Philippine National Police and caused the consolidation of public safety agencies under the Department of the Interior. At the 9th Congress he served as chairman of the Special Committee on Food Security and authored the Agrarian Reform Communities Act as part of the agriculture body.

=== KAMPI ===
Cojuangco also became the founding chairman of Kampi which was originally organized in 1997 to support the presidential bid of then Senator Gloria Macapagal Arroyo in the 1998 Philippine elections. Arroyo then later settled to run for vice president instead after Kampi formed a coalition with Lakas–NUCD which had Jose de Venecia Jr. as its standard bearer.

Cojuangco remains affiliated with Kampi which continues to exist until 2008 and has his wife as its chairperson in support of then President Gloria Macapagal Arroyo. His party supported the presidential bid of Arroyo at the 2004 Philippine elections, as well for the amendment of the constitution to facilitate a shift to a parliamentary form of government for the Philippines if Arroyo decided not to run for president.

== Horse racing career ==
Cojuangco is a Thoroughbred racehorse owner. He owned and trained Honor Roll, the winner of the 1979 Presidential Gold Cup, ridden by jockey Francisco Fernando. He was inducted into the Philippine Racing Commission Hall of Fame in 2023.

== Sports administration career ==
Cojuangco led a handful of sports associations. He was the former President of the Philippine Junior Bowlers and the RP Golf Association. He was also a founding member of the Metropolitan Association of Race Horse Owners. He is also the president of the Equestrian Association of the Philippines.

=== Philippine Olympic Committee ===
Cojuangco first ran for President of the Philippine Olympic Committee in November 2004 against then incumbent Celso Dayrit. According to Cojuangco, the position was offered by Dayrit himself following the 2002 Asian Games since Dayrit was planning to retire and wanted a person "as responsible" to succeed him. However, Dayrit did not push through with the retirement after not having contact with Cojuangco after the meeting. Cojuangco campaigned that he would secure funds from the private sector saying that the effort won't be hard as long as "businessmen know that the money they’re donating are being used properly". Cojuangco was elected to the post and formally assumed the position in January 2005.

He also served as the chief executive officer and President of the Phil Southeast Asian Games Organizing Committee which was responsible for the organization of the 2005 Southeast Asian Games. Under the watch of Cojuangco, the Philippine delegation clinched the most medals at the games. However the Philippines slid to sixth place at the 2007 Southeast Asian Games. The country also had a respectable finish at the 2006 Asian Games but the country achieved not a single medal at the 2008 Summer Olympics.

Cojuangco later won a second term in 2008 after winning against Arturo Macapagal after Cojuangco received 21 out of the 40 votes cast while his rival received 19 votes. He later secured a third term in 2012.

Cojuangco won by a landslide victory unopposed for his fourth term in 2016. However, the 2016 election was nullified by the Pasig Regional Trial Court after a petition from ABAP president Ricky Vargas was granted. Vargas ran for president in the 2016 election but the POC's Commission on Elections disqualified him and his running mate, Abraham Tolentino since the committee ruled out that both candidates were not "active members" of the POC general assembly. A new election was held on February 23, which was subsequently won by Vargas, ending Cojuangco's 13 year team as POC president. Vargas officially began his term on March 5, 2018, when he took his oath before Philippine President Rodrigo Duterte in the Malacañang Palace.

== Business career ==
In July 2010, it was reported that Cojuangco is a board member of Hacienda Luisita Inc. and Tarlac Development Corporation.

== Personal life ==
He is married to Margarita "TingTing" de los Reyes, President of the Philippine Public Safety College and former Governor of Tarlac. They have 5 daughters: Luisita Immaculada Angeles Alexandra, Josephine Victoria, Mikaela Ma. Antonia, Margarita Demetria and Regina Patricia Jose.

He is the younger brother of Corazon Aquino and uncle of Benigno Aquino III; both were Philippine presidents. He is also the last living sibling of Corazon Aquino.
