= List of executive orders by Ferdinand Marcos =

Listed below are executive orders signed by Philippine President Ferdinand Marcos.

== 1966 ==
No.	Title	Date signed
1	Conferring Cabinet rank upon the Presidential Assistant on Community Development	January 1, 1966
2	Directing the Central Bank of the Philippines to collect through the banking system the estimated customs duties, taxes and other levies due on all imported articles and merchandise	January 5, 1966
3	Amending the committee created under Executive Order No. 30, dated January 14, 1963, as amended by Executive Order No. 69, dated February 7, 1964	January 5, 1966
4	Creating the Presidential Agency on Reforms and Government Operations (PARGO)	January 7, 1966
5	Conferring Cabinet rank upon the Governor of the Land Authority	January 7, 1966
6	Enjoining all public officers and employees of the Government and private citizens to cooperate more fully in the intensified anti-smuggling campaign	January 9, 1966
7	Abolishing the Sugar Development Committee created under Executive Order No. 89, dated July 10, 1964	January 19, 1966
8	Creating the Presidential Economic Staff	February 1, 1966
9	Amending Paragraph Number Seven of Executive Order Number One, dated July Fourth Nineteen Hundred and Forty-Six, entitled "Prescribing rules and regulations for the granting and issuing of passports"	February 21, 1966
10	Centralizing the custody and disposition of confiscated goods and payment of reward to informers	February 24, 1966
11	Creating the Anti-Smuggling Action Center	February 24, 1966
12	Creating the Anti-Smuggling Fund Committee	February 24, 1966
13	Providing for the internal organization of the National Security Council	February 24, 1966
14	Creating a preliminary committee for the revision of the Revised Administrative Code	February 24, 1966
15	Creating a committee on the proposed Philippine participation in global satellite communications system	March 1, 1966
16	Creating the Council of Undersecretaries	March 14, 1966
17	Creating the Development Council	March 24, 1966
18	Creating the Intramuros Restoration Committee	March 24, 1966
19	Prescribing rules and regulations for appeals to the Office of the President for finality of decisions thereof	April 2, 1966
20	Instituting the Order of the Grieving Heart	April 12, 1966
21	Requiring all officers and employees of the Government visiting business establishments for purposes of examining books of accounts, records, or otherwise inspecting the premises thereof in connection with the performance of their duties to sign a registry book	April 23, 1966
22	Creating a national committee to take charge of all arrangements connected with state and other visits	April 25, 1966
23	Providing for an effective and well coordinated system for the security of the premises and installations of foreign diplomatic missions, consular establishments and offices of international agencies in the Philippines, and of the persons and residences of duly accredited diplomatic, consular and international officials thereof	April 25, 1966
24	Creating an Interim Water Resources Development Authority	May 1, 1966
25	Extending indefinitely the prohibition to slaughter carabaos	May 13, 1966
26	Amending Executive Order No. 236 dated February 13, 1957, entitled "Prescribing procedures for the planning of development finances, the issuance of Government securities, and the disbursement of proceeds"	May 26, 1966
27	Designating officials and employees of the National Power Corporation as deputy forest officers	June 7, 1966
28	Creating a board of management under the Department of Commerce and Industry to handle and manage Philippine participation in international trade fairs and expositions and Government-sponsored national commercial and trade fairs	June 8, 1966
29	Creating the Peace and Order Council	June 9, 1966
30	Creating the Cultural Center of the Philippines	June 25, 1966
31	Creating the Peace and Order Commission	July 5, 1966
32	Creating national and local beautification and cleanliness committee to undertake a nationwide beautification and cleanliness campaign	July 12, 1966
33	Creating a Special Committee on Government Investments and defining its powers and functions	July 21, 1966
34	Providing for the implementing details for Republic Act No. 3814, creating the Bureau of Dental Health Services	July 27, 1966
35	Amending Executive Order No. 29 dated June 9, 1966, creating the Peace and Order Council	July 27, 1966
36	Creating a committee to study the rules and regulations and problems of horse racing	July 28, 1966
37	Constituting an executive committee to implement the provisions of Executive Order No. 180 dated May 10, 1956, re: acquisition of titles to farm lots within the Mount Data National Park Reservation	August 1, 1966
38	Changing the name of the Office of the Presidential Assistant on Community Development to Presidential Arm on Community Development (PACD)	August 15, 1966
39	Creating various committees to work with the Agency for International Development (AID) and American embassy officials on certain project justifications	August 15, 1966
40	Promulgating rules and regulations on the design, construction, painting and speed of watercraft or vessels	August 17, 1966
41	Promulgating rules and regulations governing the detail or assignment of military personnel to civilian offices and officials	September 2, 1966
42	Providing instructions to be followed in the conduct of public affairs during the time that the President is outside the Philippines	September 5, 1966
43	Amending Executive Order No. 22 dated October 1, 1962, entitled "Providing for the implementing details for Republic Act No. 2717, otherwise known as the Electrification Administration Act"	September 5, 1966
44	Declaring December 12-16, 1966, as the period for the Asian Ministers of Labor Conference with the Philippines as the host country and designating the Secretary of Labor as head of the Philippine delegation and in charge of conference preparations with necessary powers and authority	September 10, 1966
45	Creating a Presidential Management Task Force to coordinate foreign-financed projects, prescribing its powers and functions and for other purposes	September 12, 1966
46	Prohibiting the slaughtering of carabaos and buffaloes	September 12, 1966
47	Modifying the rates of import duty on certain imported article, and modifying and superseding Tariff Heading 87.12 under Executive Order Numbered Two Hundred Twenty-Five, dated December 13, 1965, as provided under Republic Act Numbered Nineteen Hundred Thirty-Seven, otherwise known as the Tariff and Customs Code of the Philippines, as amended	October 13, 1966
48	Amending Executive Order No. 116, dated September 1, 1937, by providing additional exceptions thereto	October 14, 1966
49	Extending the area of the customs zone in Manila	October 14, 1966
50	Revoking Executive Order No. 62 dated January 15, 1964, which created the Rice and Corn Authority, and vesting the Rice and Corn Production Coordinating Council with the sole power and responsibility of implementing the rice and corn production program of the country	October 17, 1966
51	Temporarily granting the Agricultural Development Council for Rizal authority and discretion in the utilization of the agricultural fund of the province, subject to the control and supervision of the Agricultural Productivity Commission, and providing the necessary guidelines in the utilization thereof	November 14, 1966
52	Banning the manufacture, sale and possession of firecrackers and other pyrotechnic wares	November 28, 1966
53	Creating the Manpower Development Council	December 8, 1966
54	Creating a Joint Committee on Financial Management Improvement Program in the Philippine Government and its instrumentalities	December 8, 1966
55	Creating a committee to take charge of the rehabilitation of released prisoners	December 28, 1966
56	Prohibition to carry firearms outside residence	December 29, 1966

== 1967 ==
No.	Title	Date signed
57	Amending Executive Order No. 56 dated December 29, 1966, entitled "Prohibition to carry firearms outside residence"	January 12, 1967
58	Prescribing the rules and regulations for the government of city and municipal police agencies throughout the Philippines	January 17, 1967
59	Requiring the establishment of ROTC units in colleges and universities	February 8, 1967
60	Promulgating rules and regulations for the control and supervision of the importation, sale and possession of chemicals used as ingredients in the manufacture of explosives and for other purposes	February 9, 1967
61	Authorizing the National Shrines Commission to issue honorific titles over portions of Bataan, Corregidor and other national shrines	February 21, 1967
62	Fixing office hours during the hot season	March 29, 1967
63	Creating the Sugar Stabilization Committee under the Office of the President	May 8, 1967
64	Reconstituting the committee created under Executive Order No. 298, dated August 12, 1940, entitled "Prohibiting the automatic renewal of contracts, requiring public bidding before entering into new contracts, and providing exceptions therefor," as amended by Executive Order No. 146 dated December 27, 1955, Executive Order No. 212 dated November 6, 1956, Executive Order No. 318 dated September 17, 1958, Executive Order No. 358 dated September 23, 1959, and Executive Order No. 40 dated June 1, 1963	May 28, 1967
65	Creating a permanent committee on public bidding	May 28, 1967
66	Creating the Rice and Corn Production Coordinating Council (RCPCC) Information Center	May 28, 1967
67	Establishing a uniform crime reporting system	May 28, 1967
68	Creating the Philippine Standards Council to act as an advisory body to the Bureau of Standards and authorizing the Secretary of Commerce and Industry to appoint members of all technical committees set up by the council	May 28, 1967
69	Further amending Executive Order No. 13 dated May 16, 1907, as amended, by Executive Order No. 20 dated July 22, 1907	May 28, 1967
70	Transferring certain functions of the Office of the President to heads of departments, offices and entities	May 28, 1967
71	Requiring all Government-owned vessels utilized in maritime commerce and privately owned vessels acquired through reparations but not yet fully paid, to accept cadets from the Philippine Merchant Maritime Academy for shipboard training	May 28, 1967
72	Creating the Northern Mindanao Development Planning Board	May 28, 1967
73	Creating a Small Settlers' Protection Committee	July 13, 1967
74	Creating a Committee on Fire Control and promulgate general procedure on its functions and operation	July 13, 1967
75	Creating a special committee on Baguio squatters problem	July 14, 1967
76	Creating the Philippine Constabulary Metropolitan Command	July 14, 1967
77	Classifying municipal district in the Philippines and declaring certain municipal districts as municipalities and certain municipalities as first class municipal districts	July 18, 1967
78	Directing the strict imposition of penalties on television stations that show any television picture not approved by the Board of Censors for Motion Pictures	July 22, 1967
79	Creating the Central Institute for the Training and Relocation of Urban Squatters	July 22, 1967
80	Amending Executive Order No. 29 dated June 9, 1966, as amended by Executive Order No. 35 dated July 27, 1966, entitled "Creating the Peace and Order Council"	July 26, 1967
81	Creating a committee to coordinate the investigation, handling and disposition of apprehended illegal entrants (aliens) and foreign vessels violating Philippine laws	August 14, 1967
82	Amending Executive Order No. 56 dated December 29, 1966, as amended by Executive Order No. 57 dated January 12, 1967, prohibiting the carrying of firearms outside residence	August 14, 1967
83	Creating the National Youth Coordinating Council designating the members thereof	September 6, 1967
84	Authorizing the temporary transfer of the archives of the Republic from the Bureau of Records Management to the National Library	September 6, 1967
85	Amending Executive Order No. 16 dated April 24, 1922, as amended by Executive Order No. 33 dated January 25, 1963, so as to change the composition of the committee therein created	September 14, 1967
86	Further amending Executive Order No. 56 dated December 29, 1966, as amended, entitled "Prohibition to carry firearms outside residence"	September 22, 1967
87	Prescribing rules and regulations governing the occupancy and use of farm lots and the acquisition of titles, outside the purview of and subsequent to the promulgation of Executive Order No. 180, series of 1956, within the Mount Data National Park Reservation and Central Cordillera Forest Reserve, both in the Mountain Provinces, directing the eviction of the alien and non-native farmers within these two reservations and prosecution of Filipino dummies together with their alien exploiters for violation of the public land, anti-dummy and internal revenue laws	September 22, 1967
88	Amending Executive Order No. 4 dated January 7, 1966, entitled "Creating the Presidential Agency on Reforms and Government Operations"	September 25, 1967
89	Authorizing the provincial government of Batangas to enlist the assistance of all Government offices, agencies and instrumentalities in Batangas and of private transportation companies in the emergency incident to the eruption of Taal Volcano	October 9, 1967
90	Amending Executive Order No. 84 dated September 6, 1967, entitled, "Authorizing the temporary transfer of the archives of the Republic from the Bureau of Records Management to the National Library"	October 9, 1967
91	Further amending Executive Order No. 660, dated December 23, 1953, as amended by Executive Order No. 54, dated October 7, 1963	October 16, 1967
92	Creating the General Emilio Aguinaldo National Centennial Commission	October 23, 1967
93	Abolishing the Labor Code Committee created under Executive Order No. 172 dated October 4, 1965	October 23, 1967
94	Revoking Executive Order No. 200, issued on November 18, 1965, entitled "Directing the Board of Liquidators to acquire, administer and dispose of certain real property of the Philippine National Railways"	October 23, 1967
95	Amending Executive Order No. 65 dated May 28, 1967, entitled "Creating a permanent Cabinet committee on public bidding"	October 24, 1967
96	Decreeing that all Government edifices, buildings and offices be named in Pilipino	October 24, 1967
97	Creating a committee charged with the responsibility for planning and coordinating the financing operations of the National Government and its instrumentalities	October 26, 1967
98	Further amending Executive Order No. 30 dated January 14, 1963, as amended by Executive Order No. 3 dated January 5, 1966, creating the National Parks Development Committee	October 31, 1967
99	Amending Executive Order No. 68 dated May 28, 1967, entitled "Creating the Philippine Standard Council to act as an advisory body to the Bureau of Standards"	October 31, 1967
100	Amending Executive Order No. 46 dated September 12, 1966, prohibiting the slaughter of carabaos and buffaloes, pursuant to the provisions of Republic Act No. 11	November 2, 1967
101	Authorizing the Bureau of Standards to promulgate rules and regulations on the marking of goods standardized by the bureau	November 3, 1967
102	Opening the port of Batu-Batu, Tawi-Tawi, Sulu, as a subport of entry within the collection district of the port of Jolo, Sulu	November 20, 1967
103	Requiring that all properties belonging to the National Government, other than lands sold or leased under the Public Land Act, shall be advertised or bidded for sale or lease only upon prior approval of the Office of the President	November 20, 1967
104	Promulgating procedure for the control of alien student in the Philippines	December 4, 1967
105	Amending Executive Order No. 134 of December 17, 1964, entitled "Creating the Philippine National Volunteer Service Committee"	December 11, 1967
106	Amending Paragraph 1, Sub-Paragraph (b), of Executive Order No. 34 dated June 1, 1954, declaring that portion of the Benguet Road (Kennon Road) from Klondyke's Spring to Camp Six within the Mountain Province as toll road and fixing schedule of fees for the collection of tolls thereon	December 11, 1967
107	Further amending Executive Order No. 29 dated June 9, 1966, as amended by Executive Order No. 35 dated July 27, 1966, creating the Peace and Order Council	December 15, 1967
108	Creating a special committee on the creation of new agencies or offices and new positions	December 15, 1967
109	Authorizing the Secretary of Education to organize a unit or agency for the supervision and coordination of an integrated physical education and sports development program	December 15, 1967
110	Providing instructions to be followed in the conduct of public affairs during the time that the President is outside the Philippines	December 20, 1967
111	Modifying the rates of import duty on certain imported articles as provided under Republic Act No. 1937, otherwise known as the Tariff and Customs Code of the Philippines, as amended	December 20, 1967
112	Modifying the rates of import duty on certain imported articles as provided under Republic Act Number Nineteen Hundred Thirty-Seven, otherwise known as the Tariff and Customs Code of the Philippines, as amended	December 20, 1967
113	Prescribing the rules and regulations for the government of city and municipal police agencies throughout the Philippines	December 30, 1967

== 1968 ==
No.	Title	Date signed
114	Providing instructions to be followed in the conduct of public affairs during the time that the President is outside the Philippines	January 8, 1968
114-A	Creating an executive committee for the implementation of infrastructure programs	January 8, 1968
115	Creating the National Export Coordinating Center to facilitate processing of export permits, licenses, clearances and papers of similar nature and the receipt on payment of fees therefor	January 26, 1968
116	Creating an advisory committee on the design and construction of fallout shelters	January 28, 1968
117	Amending Executive Order No. 73 dated July 13, 1967, entitled, "Creating a Small Settlers' Protection Committee"	January 26, 1968
118	Declaring the Manila North Diversion Road (limited access), from Old Balintawak, Quezon City, to Tabang Junction, Guiguinto, Bulacan, the "Manila North Expressway" and authorizing collection of tolls therefrom	February 5, 1968
119	Creating the Leyte Development Committee	February 13, 1968
120	Creating the Metropolitan Area Command	February 16, 1968
121	Creating provincial development committees	February 26, 1968
122	Creating the Peace and Order Coordinating Council	March 11, 1968
123	Further amending Executive Order No. 58 dated August 4, 1954, as amended, by giving the National Shrines Commission the authority to enter into any contract for the purpose of converting areas into tourist sports and leasing them to qualified parties	March 15, 1968
124	Fixing office hours during the hot season	April 1, 1968
125	Amending Executive Order No. 53, dated December 8, 1966, creating the Manpower Development Council	April 21, 1968
126	Implementing and giving effect to United Nations Security Council S/RES/232 (1966) of 16 December 1966 imposing economic sanctions against the illegal regime in Southern Rhodesia	April 30, 1968
127	Amending Executive Order No. 67 dated May 28, 1967, establishing a uniform crime reporting system	May 6, 1968
128	Providing for the implementing details of Republic Act Numbered 5185, otherwise known as the Decentralization Act of 1967, insofar as the relationship of the field agricultural extension work of the local governments and the National Government is concerned	May 6, 1968
129	Providing rules and regulations governing official travel abroad of officials and employees of the Government, both national and local, including Government-owned or controlled corporations, and prescribing rates of allowances and other expenses therefor	May 6, 1968
130	Opening the port of Sta. Cruz, Marinduque, as a sub-port of entry	May 22, 1968
131	Authorizing payment of hazardous duty pay to officers of the Armed Forces of the Philippines	May 24, 1968
132	Further amending Paragraph 1, Sub-Paragraph (b) of Executive Order No. 34 dated June 1, 1954, as amended by Executive Order No. 106 dated December 11, 1967, declaring that portion of the Benguet Road (Kennon Road) from Klondyke's Spring to Camp Six within the Mountain Province as toll road and fixing schedule of fees for the collection of tolls thereon	May 24, 1968
133	Conferring Cabinet rank upon the Chairman of the Board of Investments	June 5, 1968
134	Declaring and establishing the customs zone for the port of San Fernando, La Union	June 5, 1968
135	Creating the Presidential Coordinating Committee on Housing and Urban Development	June 10, 1968
136	Creating the Sugar Production Council	June 18, 1968
137	Amending Paragraph 2 of Executive Order No. 34, series of 1954, as amended by Executive Order No. 20, series of 1962, declaring that portion of the Benguet Road (Kennon Road) from Klondyke's Spring to Camp Six within the Mountain Province as toll road and fixing schedule of fees for the collection of tolls thereon	June 25, 1968
137-A	Amending Executive Order No. 8, dated February 1, 1966, entitled, "Creating the Presidential Economic Staff"	July 1, 1968
138	Governing the seniority, promotion, and separation from the service of reserve officers of the Armed Forces of the Philippines	July 4, 1968
139	Creating a Committee on Arson and promulgating its functions	July 15, 1968
140	Creating the Coordinating Council for Business and Industry	July 13, 1968
141	Declaring unpatented mining claims which were located more than thirty years ago and which have not met the annual assessment requirement, as abandoned and their declarations of location cancelled	August 1, 1968
142	Amending Executive Order No. 92 dated October 23, 1967, creating the General Emilio Aguinaldo National Centennial Commission	August 1, 1968
143	Reconstituting the Peace and Order Commission	August 1, 1968
144	Amending Executive Order No. 136 dated June 18, 1968 by amending the composition of the Sugar Production Council	August 8, 1968
145	Amending Executive Order No. 63 dated May 8, 1967 by amending the composition of the Sugar Stabilization Committee	August 8, 1968
146	Creating a committee to undertake the inspection of all public and private buildings damaged by the recent earthquakes	August 27, 1968
147	Amending Executive Order No. 95 dated October 24, 1967, entitled "Amending Executive Order No. 65 dated May 22, 1967, entitled 'Creating a permanent Cabinet committee on public bidding'"	September 9, 1968
148	Simplifying export procedures of Government commodity agencies	September 17, 1968
149	Providing for a listing of buildings and dwellings in connection with the projected 1970 censuses of population and housing, agriculture and fisheries, and fixing census days	October 1, 1968
150	Instituting the Presidential Golden Plow Award in recognition of extraordinary and outstanding service or contribution by individuals, groups of individuals and institutions to the cause of land reform	October 1, 1968
151	Amending Executive Order No. 213 dated November 12, 1956, entitled "Requiring all departments, bureaus, offices, agencies, instrumentalities, and political subdivisions of the Government, including the corporations owned or controlled by the Government, the Armed Forces, Government hospitals, and public educational institutions to buy from the National Rice and Corn Corporation and the Central Cooperative Exchange, Inc., whenever available, all their requirements for rice"	October 7, 1968
152	Amending Executive Order No. 87 dated September 22, 1967, by extending the period for the technical survey of farm lot claims up to April 30, 1969	October 12, 1968
153	Creating the national committee on UNIDO matters	October 15, 1968
154	Creating a National Coordinating Committee on Reforestation and Tree-Planting	October 18, 1968
155	Creating the Gomez, Burgos, Zamora Centennial Commission	October 28, 1968
156	Constituting the "Fund for Assistance to Private Education" as an irrevocable trust fund, creating a "Private Education Assistance Committee" as trustee, and providing for the management thereof	November 5, 1968
157	Creating the National Coordinating Council on Recruitment Problems	November 10, 1968
158	Creating the National Intelligence Board	November 19, 1968
159	Requiring all departments, bureaus, offices, agencies, instrumentalities and political subdivisions of the Government, including the corporations owned or controlled by the Government, the Armed Forces, Government hospitals, and public educational institutions, to establish their respective disaster control organization	November 26, 1968
160	Amending Executive Order No. 154 dated October 18, 1968, entitled "Creating a National Coordinating Committee on Reforestation and Tree-Planting"	November 29, 1968
161	Abolishing the Tondo Foreshore Development Committee created under Administrative Order No. 92, dated November 20, 1967, and transferring its functions to the Presidential Coordinating Committee on Housing and Urban Development created under Executive Order No. 135, dated June 10, 1968	November 29, 1968
162	Implementing and giving effect to United Nations Security Council Resolution 253 (1968) of 29 May 1968 imposing sanctions against the illegal regime of Southern Rhodesia	December 20, 1968
163	Amending Executive Order No. 156, dated November 5, 1968, entitled "Constituting the Fund for Assistance to Private Education as an irrevocable trust fund, creating a Private Education Assistance Committee as trustee, and providing for the management thereof"	December 20, 1968

== 1969 ==
No.	Title	Date signed
164	Creating a committee to coordinate and supervise the collation, collection, identification, classification, reproduction and release of archival materials and other historical papers in the possession of Government agencies	January 17, 1969
165	Modifying the rates of import duty on certain imported articles as provided under Republic Act Number Nineteen Hundred Thirty-Seven, otherwise known as the Tariff and Customs Code of the Philippines, as amended	January 20, 1969
166	Modifying the rates of import duty on certain imported articles as provided under Republic Act Number Nineteen Hundred Thirty-Seven, otherwise known as the Tariff and Customs Code of the Philippines, as amended	January 25, 1969
167	Certifying that the manufacture of plasticizers in the Philippines, as a preferred pioneer industry shall be entitled to a post-operative tariff protection	January 25, 1969
168	Creating a Small Farmers Commission	February 5, 1969
169	Creating a Youth and Student Affairs Board	February 8, 1969
170	Promulgating the Manual of Student Rights and Responsibilities	February 15, 1969
171	Creating the Commission on Population	February 19, 1969
172	Amending Executive Order No. 159 dated July 27, 1965 which created the Bicol Development Planning Board	February 24, 1969
173	Abolishing the National Youth Coordinating Council	February 25, 1969
174	Further amending Executive Order No. 571 creating a decoration to be known as the Order of Sikatuna	February 26, 1969
175	Fixing office hours during the hot season	March 22, 1969
176	Creating a national committee to take charge of the celebration of Philippine Independence Day on June 12, 1969	March 22, 1969
177	Providing instructions to be followed in the conduct of public affairs during the time that the President is outside the Philippines	March 30, 1969
178	Creating the Panay Development Planning Board	April 21, 1969
179	Organizing the Reserve Airlift and Tactical Support Service in the Philippine Air Force and for other purposes	April 24, 1969
180	Reconstituting the Committee on Wood Industries Development under the Office of the President	April 25, 1969
181	Amending the composition of the Independence Day National Committee	April 12, 1965
182	Amending Executive Order No. 87 dated September 22, 1967, by extending the periods for compliance with the requisite conditions for the issuance of patents or certificates of title as well as the technical survey of farm lot claims to September 22, 1971, and April 30, 1970, respectively	April 29, 1969
182-A	Creating a National Social Action Council	May 1, 1969
183	Creating the National Food and Agriculture Council	May 6, 1969
184	Classifying municipal districts in the Philippines and declaring certain municipal districts as municipalities	June 23, 1969
185	Amending Executive Order No. 10 dated February 24, 1966, entitled "Centralizing the custody and disposition of confiscated goods and payment of reward to informers"	July 24, 1965
186	Further amending Executive Order No. 408 dated November 9, 1960, as amended by Executive Order No. 62 dated September 18, 1963, entitled "Providing a more expeditious system and simpler forms for the encouragement and facilitation of foreign tourist travel to the Philippines"	August 5, 1969
187	Nag-aatas sa lahat nang kagawaran, kawanihan, tanggapan at iba pang sangay ng pamahalaan na gamitin ang wikang Pilipino hangga't maaari sa Linggo ng Wikang Pambansa at pagkaraan nito, sa lahat nang opisyal na komunikasyon at transaksyon ng Pamahalaan; lit. 'Decreeing all departments, bureaus, offices and other agencies of the Government to use the Pilipino language when possible during National Language Week and beyond in all official communications and transactions of the Government'	August 6, 1969
188	Amending Executive Order No. 182-A dated May 1, 1969, entitled "Creating a National Social Action Council"	September 6, 1969
189	Further amending Executive Order No. 30 dated January 14, 1963, as amended, which created the National Parks Development Committee	September 6, 1969
190	Decreeing the use of voter's identification card issued by the Commission on Elections for identification purposes in transactions with any Government office or Government-owned or controlled corporation	September 16, 1969
191	Conferring Cabinet rank upon the Administrator of the National Cottage Industries Development Authority (NACIDA)	September 24, 1969
192	Creating a committee to look into the books, business affairs and administration of private colleges and universities	September 30, 1969
193	Creating a Cement Board to study and work out solutions to the problems of the cement industry	September 30, 1969
194	Further amending Executive Order No. 321 dated June 12, 1950, as revised by Executive Order No. 137 dated January 7, 1965, prescribing the Code of the National Flag and the National Anthem of the Republic of the Philippines	October 13, 1969
195	Amending Executive Order No. 180 dated April 25, 1969, entitled "Reconstituting the Committee on Wood Industries Development under the Office of the President"	October 13, 1969
196	Reconstituting the committee created under Executive Order No. 298 dated August 12, 1950, entitled "Prohibiting the automatic renewal of contracts, requiring public bidding before entering into new contracts, and providing exceptions therefor," as amended by Executive Order No. 146 dated December 27, 1955, Executive Order No. 212 dated November 6, 1956, Executive Order No. 318 dated September 17, 1958, Executive Order No. 358 dated September 23, 1959, Executive Order No. 40 dated June 1, 1963, and Executive Order No. 64 dated May 28, 1967	October 13, 1969
197	Authorizing the documentation and admission of foreign nationals employed under Republic Act No. 5186, otherwise known as the Investment Incentives Act, as nonimmigrants under Section 47 (a)(2) of the Philippine Immigration Act of 1940, as amended	October 14, 1969
198	Creating Fisherman's Market Authority	October 27, 1969
199	Amending Executive Order No. 33, dated July 21, 1966, entitled "Creating a Special Committee on Government Investments and defining its powers and functions"	November 27, 1969
200	Promulgating a Manual of Student Rights and Responsibilities	December 5, 1969
201	Declaring the Manila South Diversion Road (limited access), Highway 54-Alabang Section, the "Manila South Expressway" and authorizing collection of tolls therefrom	December 16, 1969
202	Creating a Presidential Commission to Survey Philippine Education	December 24, 1969
203	Placing state universities, colleges, schools and other educational institutions under the supervision of the Secretary of Education	December 26, 1969

== 1970 ==
No.	Title	Date signed
204	Creating a special committee to conduct public hearings in connection with the proposed increase of water rates by the National Waterworks and Sewerage Authority	January 5, 1970
205	Creating the Foreign Trade Council	January 9, 1970
206	Directing the Central Bank of the Philippines to receive payment through the banking system of national internal revenue taxes	January 9, 1970
207	Creating a National Development Council	January 13, 1970
208	Strengthening the Cabinet to make it a more effective vehicle for the attainment of developmental goals	February 9, 1970
209	Amending Executive Order Numbered Three Hundred and Two dated May Five, Nineteen Hundred and Fifty-Eight	February 10, 1970
210	Requiring Government offices, agencies and instrumentalities to submit to the Bureau of Internal Revenue an annual list of money payments on transactions with private individuals, corporations, partnerships and associations	February 14, 1970
211	Operating the Presidential Census Coordinating Board, authorizing the establishment of local census boards, and proclaiming Wednesday, May 6, 1970 as Census Day	February 14, 1970
212	Creating the National Artificial Rain Stimulation Committee	February 17, 1970
212-A	Dispensing with the submission to the Office of the President for review or approval of certain contracts or transactions	March 1, 1970
213	Directing all departments, bureaus, offices, agencies and instrumentalities, including Government-owned or controlled corporations, to require every individual, corporation, partnership, and association to state or place on all documents and records of any business transactions with the said Government entities, and such other individual transactions between persons and entities whose documents need to be registered, to state or place on the said records and documents their tax account number	March 5, 1970
214	Requiring all departments, bureaus, offices, agencies, and instrumentalities of the Government in the Greater Manila Area, including corporations owned or controlled by the Government, to buy from the Greater Manila Terminal Food Market, Inc., their requirements for agricultural and meat products, whenever available	March 6, 1970
215	Reorganizing the Presidential Committee on Housing and Urban Development created under Executive Order No. 135, dated June 10, 1968, as amended by Executive Order No. 161 dated November 28, 1968, and amending Executive Order No. 208, dated February 9, 1970, entitled "Strengthening the Cabinet to make it more effective vehicle for the attainment of developmental goals"	March 7, 1970
216	Giving priority and prompt attention to matters referred to the Philippine Government concerning its participation in the United Nations and in other international organizations and conferences	March 21, 1970
217	Changing the composition of the Special Committee on Scholarships created under the Cabinet dated June 6, 1956	March 21, 1970
218	Amending Executive Order No. 70 dated May 28, 1967, entitled "Transferring certain functions of the Office of the President to heads of departments, offices and entities"	March 21, 1970
219	Abolishing certain commissions, councils and committees	March 21, 1970
220	Transferring certain agencies of the Office of the President to the regular executive departments and agencies	March 21, 1970
221	Reconstituting the Peace and Order Coordinating Council	March 21, 1970
222	Creating the Council of Leaders	March 21, 1970
223	Reconstituting the Financial Policy Committee	March 21, 1970
224	Reconstituting the Air Navigation Services Coordinating Committee under the Office of the President	March 21, 1970
225	Reconstituting the Financial Policy Committee and renaming it Financial and Fiscal Policy Committee	April 21, 1970
226	Creating a national committee to take charge of the celebrations of Philippine Independence Day on June 12, 1970	April 21, 1970
227	Amending Executive Order No. 180 dated April 25, 1969 and Executive Order No. 195 dated October 13, 1969 entitled "Reconstituting the Committee on Wood Industries Development under the Office of the President"	April 24, 1970
228	Requiring the immediate reversion to surplus of all accounts payable and unliquidated obligations which are two years old or over and/or other undocumented payable accounts irrespective of age, and prescribing the procedures for certification to accounts payable at the end of the fiscal year	April 29, 1970
229	Further amending Executive Order No. 182-A dated May 1, 1969, as amended by Executive Order No. 188 dated September 6, 1969, entitled "Creating a National Social Action Council	April 30, 1970
230	Creating a special committee to conduct public hearings in connection with the proposed increase of power rates by the National Power Corporation	May 5, 1970
231	Further amending Executive Order No. 56 dated December 29, 1966, entitled "Prohibition to carry firearms outside residence"	May 7, 1970
232	Creating the Presidential Development Budget Committee	May 14, 1970
233	Creating the Commission on Population	May 15, 1970
234	Banning the slaughter of carabaos and buffaloes	May 16, 1970
235	Creating an Irrigation and Water Resources Committee to study the development and utilization of all national water resources	June 1, 1970
236	Amending Executive Order No. 233, dated May 15, 1970, entitled "Creating the Commission on Population"	June 16, 1970
237	Creating the National Council for Small and Medium Industries	June 16, 1970
238	Creating a committee to study, evolve, and recommend policies relative to the settlement of land disputes and priorities in the granting of titles over public lands	June 18, 1970
239	Creating an executive committee to act as advisory council to the FAO seminar on measures to accelerate benefits from water use at the farm level to be held in Quezon City in October 1970	June 22, 1970
240	Amending Executive Order No. 212, dated February 17, 1970, entitled "Creating the National Artificial Rain Stimulation Committee"	June 25, 1970
241	Amending Executive Order No. 225, dated April 21, 1970, which created the Financial and Fiscal Policy Committee	June 29, 1970
242	Creating a Cooperatives Coordinating Committee	June 29, 1970
243	Creating a National Committee for Mineral Explorations and Survey Operations	July 7, 1970
244	Amending Executive Order No. 168 dated February 5, 1969, entitled "Creating a Small Farmers Commission"	July 10, 1970
245	Prescribing the procedure for mineral prospecting and exploitation in Government reservations other than mineral reservations	July 10, 1970
246	Amending Executive Order No. 238 dated June 18, 1970, entitled "Creating a committee to study, evolve, and recommend policies relative to the settlement of land disputes and priorities in the granting of titles over public lands"	July 16, 1970
247	Amending Executive Order No. 53, dated October 3, 1963, entitled "Abolishing the Juan Luna Centennial Commission"	July 24, 1970
248	Empowering the Land Transportation Commission to control and supervise the operations of motor vehicle driving schools	July 24, 1970
249	Amending Executive Order No. 286, series of 1949, by reorganizing the Fair Trade Board and vesting it with more powers and authority	July 27, 1970
250	Creating the Development Management Staff within the Office of the President	July 29, 1970
251	Creating a Presidential Action Committee on Land Problems	July 31, 1970
252	Further amending Executive Order No. 182-A May 1, 1969, as amended by Executive Order No. 188 dated September 6, 1969, and Executive Order No. 229 dated April 30, 1970, entitled "Creating a National Social Action Council"	August 3, 1970
253	Amending Executive Order No. 234 dated May 16, 1970, which bans the slaughter of carabaos and buffaloes	August 5, 1970
254	Further amending Executive Order No. 132, dated December 27, 1937, as amended by Executive Order No. 214, dated July 10, 1939, which created the provincial appraisal committee	August 25, 1970
255	Amending Executive Order No. 205 creating the Foreign Trade Council	August 25, 1970
256	Amending Executive Order No. 242 dated June 29, 1970, which created the Cooperatives Coordinating Committee	August 25, 1970
257	Creating national and local beautification and cleanliness committee to undertake a nationwide beautification and cleanliness campaign	September 14, 1970
258	Creating the National Action Committee on Anti-Smuggling Affairs	September 17, 1970
259	Amending Executive Order No. 237 dated June 16, 1970, which created the National Council for Small and Medium Industries	September 18, 1970
260	Amending Executive Order No. 113 dated December 30, 1967, otherwise known as the Police Manual	September 22, 1970
261	Placing the port of Calapan, Oriental Mindoro and its facilities under the jurisdiction, administration and control of the Bureau of Customs	September 23, 1970
262	Adjusting the quarters allowances of commissioned officers of the Armed Forces of the Philippines	September 24, 1970
263	Creating a committee to study the feasibility of establishing a resettlement area in Montalban, Rizal	October 2, 1970
264	Outlining the procedure by which complainants charging Government officials and employees with commission of irregularities should be guided	October 6, 1970
265	Amending Executive Order No. 85 dated December 15, 1956, establishing a rat-proof building zone in Manila port	October 12, 1970
266	Amending Executive Order No. 18 dated September 16, 1946, entitled "Establishing the organization and operation of the Department of Foreign Affairs and of the Foreign Service of the Republic of the Philippines and fixing the emoluments, privileges and allowances of the officers and employees thereof"	October 12, 1970
267	Amending Executive Order No. 233 dated May 15, 1970, entitled "Creating the Commission on Population"	October 20, 1970
268	Establishing a Presidential Award in Education	October 29, 1970
269	Reconstituting the Committee on Public Bidding created under Executive Order No. 65 dated May 28, 1967	November 2, 1970
270	Further amending Executive Order No. 30 dated January 14, 1963, as amended by Executive Order No. 69 dated February 7, 1964, Executive Order No. 3 dated January 5, 1966 and Executive Order No. 98 dated October 31, 1967	November 16, 1970
271	Further amending Executive Order No. 233 dated May 15, 1970, entitled "Creating the Commission on Population", as amended by Executive Order No. 236 dated June 16, 1970	November 16, 1970
272	Creating a Social Defense Planning Committee	November 16, 1970
273	Amending Executive Order No. 22 dated April 25, 1966, entitled "Creating a national committee to take charge of all arrangements connected with state and other visits"	November 23, 1970
274	Requiring he submission of an annual program of procurement by the departments, bureaus, offices and agencies of the National Government	November 24, 1970
275	Modifying the rates of import duty on certain imported articles as provided under Republic Act Numbered Nineteen Hundred Thirty-Seven, otherwise known as the Tariff and Customs Code of the Philippines, as amended	November 26, 1970
276	Modifying the rates of import duty on certain imported articles as provided under Republic Act Numbered Nineteen Hundred Thirty-Seven, otherwise known as the Tariff and Customs Code of the Philippines, as amended	November 26, 1970
277	Creating the Presidential Advisory Committee on the Copper Industry	December 8, 1970
278	Authorizing the transfer to provincial and city jails of national prisoners sentenced to not more than three years	December 8, 1970
279	Modifying the rates of import duty on certain imported articles as provided under Republic Act Numbered Nineteen Hundred Thirty-Seven, otherwise known as the Tariff and Customs Code of the Philippines, as amended	December 11, 1970
280	Creating a Presidential Census Coordinating Board, authorizing the establishment of local census boards, and proclaiming April 1, 1971, as Census Day for Agriculture and Fisheries	December 13, 1970
281	Creating the Presidential Commission to review and revise the Reorganization Plan	December 29, 1970

== 1971 ==
No.	Title	Date signed
282	Modifying the rates of import duty on certain imported articles as provided under Republic Act Numbered Nineteen Hundred Thirty-Seven, otherwise known as the Tariff and Customs Code of the Philippines, as amended	January 4, 1971
283	Creating the Presidential Oil Commission	January 31, 1971
284	Delegating authority on administrative actions in the executive branch of the Government	January 19, 1971
285	Authorizing the National Food and Agriculture Council to include nutrition coordination in its food production program	January 21, 1971
286	Directing Government agencies concerned to expedite the full implementation of the simplified export procedure for BOI registered enterprises under Republic Act No. 6135, or Export Incentives Act	January 27, 1971
287	Creating a Presidential Committee to review the operations of public utility companies	February 1, 1971
288	Amending Executive Order No. 155, dated October 28, 1968, which created the Gomez, Burgos, Zamora Centennial Commission	February 6, 1971
289	Creating the Cotabato Peace Commission	February 10, 1971
290	Amending Executive Order No. 243, dated July 7, 1970, creating the National Committee for Mineral Exploration and Survey Operations	February 10, 1971
291	Further amending Executive Order No. 238 dated June 18, 1970, entitled "Creating a committee to study, evolve, and recommend policies relative to the settlement of land disputes and priorities in the granting of titles over public lands"	February 15, 1971
292	Amending Executive Order No. 180, series of 1969, reconstituting the Committee on Wood Industries Development under the Office of the President	February 17, 1971
293	Classification of UP Roads	February 17, 1971
294	Creating a decoration to be known as the Order of Kalantiao	March 1, 1971
295	Further amending Executive Order No. 237 dated June 16, 1970, which created the National Council for Small and Medium Industries	March 2, 1971
296	Amending Executive Order No. 277, dated December 8, 1970, entitled "Creating the Presidential Advisory Committee on the Copper Industry"	March 2, 1971
297	Declaring and defining the customs zone for the North Harbor, Manila	March 4, 1971
298	Amending Executive Order No. 251 dated July 31, 1970, creating the Presidential Action Committee on Land Problems	March 4, 1971
299	Creating the Presidential Cooperative Development Council	March 6, 1971
300	Amending Executive Order No. 164 dated January 17, 1969, entitled "Creating a committee to coordinate and supervise the collation, collection, identification, classification, reproduction and release of archival materials and other historical papers in the possession of Government agencies"	March 10, 1971
301	Further amending Executive Order No. 155 dated October 28, 1968, as amended by Executive Order No. 288 dated February 6, 1971, which created the Gomez, Burgos, Zamora Centennial Commission	March 12, 1971
302	Amending Executive Order No. 115, dated 26 January 1968, creating the National Export Coordinating Center	March 16, 1971
303	Further amending Executive Order No. 11, series of 1966, as amended by Executive Order No. 220 dated March 21, 1970, creating the Anti-Smuggling Action Center	March 16, 1971
304	Reconstituting the Institute of National Language and defining its powers and duties	March 16, 1971
305	Reconstituting the Presidential Action Committee on Land Problems	March 19, 1971
306	Constituting the "Fund for Assistance to Students" as an irrevocable trust fund, creating a "Students Assistance Committee" as trustee, and providing for the management thereof	March 22, 1971
307	Creating the Philippine Agricultural Training Council	March 23, 1971
308	Extending the term of the Presidential Commission to review and revise the Reorganization Plan	March 25, 1971
309	Creating an ad hoc committee to conduct a feasibility study of a satisfactory system of disposing mine tailings from the Baguio mining district	April 16, 1971
310	Creating the Inter-Departmental Committee on Children and Youth	April 16, 1971
311	Creating a national committee to take charge of the celebrations of Philippine Independence Day on June 12, 1971	April 23, 1971
312	Creating a Debt Clearing Committee to effect an inter-Government liquidation of domestic and foreign debts either through cash payment or through offsetting of the accounts subsisting among the National Government, its agencies and instrumentalities, including Government-owned or controlled corporations, as well as local governments	April 23, 1971
313	Creating a Cottage Industry Development Council and a Cottage Industry Development Enterprise	April 23, 1971
314	Amending Executive Order No. 212-A dated March 1, 1970, entitled "Dispensing with the submission to the Office of the President for review or approval of certain contracts or transactions"	April 26, 1971
315	Establishing the Navotas Fish Landing and Market at Navotas, Rizal, and creating the Navotas Fish Landing Authority	April 29, 1971
316	Delegating to the National Historical Commission the authority to choose and select the awardee or awardees in the field of history, Annual Republic Cultural Heritage Awards	May 6, 1971
317	Creating the executive committee of the summer workcamp for the children of the Tondo fire victims	May 6, 1971
318	Establishment of an Education Task Force	May 17, 1971
319	Amending Executive Order No. 243, dated July 7, 1970, entitled "Creating a National Committee for Mineral Explorations and Survey Operations"	May 31, 1971
320	Further amending Executive Order No. 134 dated December 17, 1964, entitled "Creating the Philippine Volunteer Service Committee"	May 31, 1971
321	Creating a National Forestry Extension Advisory Board charged with responsibility of planning and coordinating the forest extension program of the National Government and its instrumentalities	May 31, 1971
322	Establishing the National Computer Center	June 12, 1971
323	Amending Executive Order No. 64 dated May 28, 1967, entitled "Reconstituting the committee created under Executive Order No. 298 dated August 12, 1940, entitled 'Prohibiting the automatic renewal of contracts, requiring public bidding before entering into new contracts, and providing exceptions therefor' as amended by Executive Order No. 146 dated December 27, 1955, Executive Order No. 212 dated November 6, 1956, Executive Order No. 318 dated September 17, 1958, Executive Order No. 358 dated September 23, 1959, and Executive Order No. 40 dated June 1, 1963"	June 18, 1971
324	Constituting an interim inter-agency committee for the development and administration of the Sangley Point area	June 19, 1971
325	Declaring the Greater Manila Terminal Food Market, Inc. (GMTFM) Slaughterhouse and Chicken Dressing Plant a national abattoir and directing all provincial governors, city mayors and municipal mayors to minimize undue increases of, and thus stabilize prices of livestock meat and poultry products by facilitating the unrestricted marketing thereof to and from the Greater Manila Terminal Food Market to all provinces, cities and municipalities	July 6, 1971
326	Amending Executive Order No. 313 dated April 23, 1971, creating a Cottage Industry Development Council and a Cottage Industry Development Enterprise	July 12, 1971
327	Further amending Executive Order No. 183 dated May 6, 1969, as amended by Executive Order No. 285 dated January 21, 1971, creating the National Food and Agriculture Council	July 13, 1971
328	Adjusting the base pay of Philippine Military Academy cadets, probationary second lieutenants, and 20-year old trainees of the Armed Forces of the Philippines	July 30, 1971
329	Instituting the Presidential Citation for Outstanding Humanitarian Services	August 10, 1971
330	Amending Executive Order No. 205 dated January 9, 1970, entitles "Creating the Foreign Trade Council"	August 10, 1971
331	Creating the Philippine Virginia Tobacco Board	August 10, 1971
332	Creating the Pesticides Control and Research Committee	August 10, 1971
333	Creating a Presidential Administrative Assistance Committee relative to the implementation of Proclamation No. 889 dated August 21, 1971, suspending the privilege of the writ of habeas corpus	August 26, 1971
334	Creating the Coconut Coordinating Council	August 30, 1971
335	Designating the Bureau of Customs as certifying authority for certificates of origin covering Philippine exports under the generalized scheme of preferences (GSP) of the United Nations Conference on Trade and Development	August 30, 1971
336	Certifying that the production of cold-rolled steel black sheets, as a preferred pioneer industry, shall be entitled to post operative tariff protection	August 31, 1971
337	Establishment of a Medical Assistance Program Task Force	September 1, 1971
338	Creating the Permanent Committee for the Implementation of the Philippine-Indonesian Agreements on Economic and Technical Cooperation, and defining its powers and functions	September 9, 1971
339	Amending Executive Order No. 206 of January 9, 1970, so as to direct the Central Bank of the Philippines to receive payment through the banking system of other national internal revenue taxes	September 9, 1971
340	Prohibiting the carrying of firearms outside residence	September 16, 1971
341	Creating the Presidential Investigation and Recovery Commission	October 4, 1971
342	Establishing the Pollution Research Center of the Philippines	October 5, 1971
343	Amending Executive Order No. 215 dated March 7, 1970, reorganizing the Presidential Committee on Housing and Urban Resettlement, by designating the Secretary of Public Works and Communications as Executive Director thereof	October 13, 1971
344	Setting procedures for the disposition of and disbursements from the proceeds from the sale of the rice donation of the Government of Japan	October 14, 1971
345	Creating the National Commission for the Second Development Decade	October 29, 1971
346	Constituting a coordinating committee for the symposium of Southeast Asian countries on research and marketing of Asian tropical timber and timber products	November 7, 1971
347	Providing for the organization of the Department of Agrarian Reform	November 10, 1971
348	Creating the Agricultural Guarantee Fund Board	November 10, 1971
349	Creating the Council of Leaders	November 16, 1971
350	Amending Executive Order No. 317 dated September 2, 1958, which reconstituted the National Security Council	November 16, 1971
351	Amending Executive Order No. 17 dated March 24, 1966, which created the Development Council	November 16, 1971
352	Creating the Foreign Policy Council	November 16, 1971
353	Promulgating the guidelines to govern the review by Government agencies concerned of service agreements between local petroleum concessionaires and foreign oil exploration companies	November 22, 1971
354	Creating the Inter-Agency Committee on ASEAN affairs and defining its powers and functions	November 23, 1971
355	Modifying the rates of import duty on certain imported articles as provided under Republic Act No. 1937, otherwise known as the Tariff and Customs Code of the Philippines, as amended	November 29, 1971
356	Creating a special evaluation and awards committee to evaluate bid proposals and proposed negotiated contracts of the Philippine National Railways, National Power Corporation and People's Homesite and Housing Corporation	December 3, 1971
357	Further amending Executive Order No. 8 dated February 1, 1966, entitled "Creating the Presidential Economic Staff"	December 10, 1971
358	Amending Executive Order No. 232 dated May 14, 1970, entitled "Creating the Presidential Development Budget Committee"	December 21, 1971
359	Amending Executive Order No. 225 dated April 21, 1970, entitled "Reconstituting the Financial Policy Committee and renaming it Financial and Fiscal Policy Committee"	December 21, 1971
360	Amending Executive Order No. 337 dated September 1, 1971, establishing a Medical Assistance Program Task Force	December 23, 1971
361	Designating the Department of Agrarian Reform as trustee of the Special Fund for Assistance to the Philippine Land Reform Education Program	December 24, 1971
362	Further amending Executive Order No. 223 dated March 21, 1970, as amended by Executive Order No. 225 dated April 21, 1970	December 28, 1971

== 1972 ==
No.	Title	Date signed
363	Creating consumer cooperatives and consumer unions	January 11, 1972
364	Creating the Philippine committee for the establishment of the Asian Handicraft Center	January 11, 1972
365	Creating the Caliraya Development Commission	January 11, 1972
366	Creating the Assistance Center for Ex-Servicemen	January 12, 1972
367	Modifying the rates of import duty on certain imported articles as provided under Republic Act No. 1937, otherwise known as the Tariff and Customs Code of the Philippines, as amended	January 18, 1972
367-A	Amending Executive Order No. 367 dated January 18, 1972, entitled "Modifying the rates of import duty on certain imported articles as provided under Republic Act No. 1937, otherwise known as the Tariff and Customs Code of the Philippines, as amended"	January 21, 1972
368	Certifying that the production of polyester fibers, as a preferred pioneer industry, shall be entitled to post-operative tariff protection	January 21, 1972
369	Modifying the rates of import duty on certain imported articles as provided under Republic Act Numbered Nineteen Hundred Thirty-Seven, otherwise known as the Tariff and Customs Code of the Philippines, as amended	January 21, 1972
370	Transferring the administration and custody of the Aguinaldo Mansion in Kawit, Cavite, from the National Museum to the National Historical Commission	January 31, 1972
371	Creating the Philippine committee on UNCTAD matters	January 31, 1972
372	Amending Executive Order No. 337 dated September 1, 1971, establishing a Medical Assistance Program Task Force	February 3, 1972
373	Designating the Department of Commerce and Industry to wind up the affairs of the Board of Industries	February 8, 1972
374	Creating a Cabinet committee to study and recommend solutions to the Chinese problem	February 11, 1972
375	Establishing the Pollution Research Center of the Philippines	February 15, 1972
376	Conferring Cabinet rank upon the Press Secretary	February 18, 1972
377	Further amending Executive Order No. 212 dated February 17, 1970, as amended by Executive Order No. 240 dated June 25, 1970, creating the National Artificial Rain Stimulation Committee	February 29, 1972
378	Creating the Philippine Tourist Board	February 29, 1972
379	Further amending Paragraph I, Sub-Paragraph (e) of Executive Order No. 34, series of 1954, declaring that portion of the Benguet Road (Kennon Road) from Klondyke's Spring to Camp Six within the Mountain Province as toll road and fixing schedule of fees for the collection of tolls thereon	March 1, 1972
380	Reconstituting the Coconut Coordinating Council created under Executive Order No. 334 dated August 30, 1971	March 1, 1972
381	Creating the Manila International Airport Rehabilitation and Improvement Committee	March 3, 1972
382	Amending Executive Order No. 374, dated February 11, 1972, creating a Cabinet committee to study and recommend solutions to the Chinese problem	March 3, 1972
383	Creating the Caliraya Development Commission	March 10, 1972
384	Promulgating policy guidelines and trade with socialist and communist countries	March 11, 1972
385	Delineating jurisdiction over waterworks systems	March 14, 1972
386	Authorizing the Administrator, National Irrigation Administration, to coordinate all pump irrigation programs	March 14, 1972
387	Creating the Presidential Committee on Typhoon Moderation	March 20, 1972
388	Creating a National Council on Physical Fitness	April 11, 1972
389	Amending Executive Order No. 281 dated December 29, 1970, creating the Presidential Commission to Review and Revise the Reorganization Plan	April 17, 1972
390	Requiring the filing of criminal complaints against Government personnel charged administratively, where the administrative case involves dishonesty, corruption or moral turpitude	April 26, 1972
391	Appointing a member of the minority party as member in committees on pre-qualifications and awards in each national agency undertaking infrastructure projects	May 2, 1972
392	Creating a national committee to take charge of the celebration of Philippine Independence Day on June 12, 1972	May 9, 1972
393	Prescribing regulations in the operation and activities of private detectives, watchmen and security guards	May 10, 1972
394	Further amending Executive Order No. 263 dated August 15, 1957, entitled "Creating the Pinaglabanan Commemorative Commission," as amended by Executive Order No. 300 dated May 29, 1958, and Executive Order No. 433 dated June 20, 1961	May 16, 1972
395	Amending Executive Order No. 120 dated February 16, 1968, creating the Metropolitan Area Command	May 16, 1972
396	Reconstituting the internal organization of the National Security Council	June 19, 1972
397	Extending the term of the Presidential Commission on Reorganization created under Executive Order No. 281, s. 1970	June 27, 1972
398	Reconstituting the commission created under Executive Order No. 341 dated October 4, 1971, entitled "Creating the Presidential Investigation and Recovery Commission"	June 30, 1972
399	Creating a Presidential Task Force on Rehabilitation Operations	July 26, 1972
400	Classifying the entry of foreign correspondents into the Philippines under the category of temporary visitors as provided in Section 9(a) of the Philippine Immigration Act of 1940, as amended	August 17, 1972
401	Creating the Refuse Management Task Force	August 28, 1972
402	To include an additional member to the Executive Committee of the National Security Council	September 14, 1972
403	Subsuming the Presidential Advisory Council on Public Works and Community Development to the Presidential Economic Staff	September 22, 1972
404	Extending the term of the Presidential Commission on Reorganization created under Executive Order No. 281, series of 1970	September 29, 1972
405	Extending the term of the Presidential Commission on Reorganization created under Executive Order No. 281, series of 1970	December 26, 1972

== 1973 ==
No.	Title	Date signed
406	Creating an ad hoc custodial committee for the records and property of the 1971 Constitutional Convention	February 19, 1973
407	Delegating to certain district land officers the power to sign patents and certificates	March 16, 1973
408	Creating a national committee to take charge of the celebration of Philippine Independence Day on June 12, 1973	March 20, 1973
409	Extending the term of the Presidential Commission on Reorganization created under Executive Order No. 281, series of 1970	March 24, 1973
410	Amending Executive Order No. 342 dated October 5, 1971, establishing the Pollution Research Center of the Philippines so as to change the name thereof to Environmental Center of the Philippines	March 27, 1973
411	Creating a Presidential Task Force for the Reconstruction and Development of Mindanao	April 2, 1973
412	Creating the Bicol River Basin Council	May 7, 1973
414	Modifying the rates of import duty on certain imported articles as provided under Republic Act No. 1937, otherwise known as the Tariff and Customs Code of the Philippines, as amended	June 20, 1973
415	Creating a National Commission on Savings	June 29, 1973
416	Extending the term of the Presidential Commission on Reorganization created under Executive Order No. 281, series of 1970	June 29, 1973
417	Creating a joint project for pilot production of high-protein dry coconut milk powder	July 3, 1973
418	Creating a Green Revolution Expanded Program Action Committee	July 26, 1973
419	Creating a Task Force on Human Settlements	September 19, 1973
420	Delegating to certain district land officers the power to sign patents and certificates	October 30, 1973
421	Amending Executive Order No. 129 dated May 6, 1968, entitled "Providing rules and regulations governing official travel abroad of officials and employees of the Government, both national and local, including Government-owned or controlled corporations and prescribing rates of allowances and other expenses therefor"	November 26, 1973
422	Extending the term of the Presidential Commission on Reorganization created under Executive Order No. 281, series of 1970	December 26, 1973

== 1974 ==
No.	Title	Date signed
423	Modifying the rates of import duty on certain imported articles as provided under Republic Act No. 1937, otherwise known as the Tariff and Customs Code of the Philippines, as amended	January 2, 1974
424	Modifying the rates of import duty on certain imported articles as provided under Republic Act No. 1937, otherwise known as the Tariff and Customs Code of the Philippines, as amended	January 22, 1974
425	Imposing premium duty on certain export products in addition to export tariffs provided for under Republic Act No. 1937, otherwise known as the "Tariff and Customs Code", as amended by Presidential Decree No. 230	February 17, 1974
426	Creating a national committee to take charge of the celebration of Philippine Independence Day on 12 June 1974	April 1, 1974
427	Creating a Presidential Task Force for the Integrated Development of the Cagayan Valley	April 1, 1974
428	Modifying the rates of import duty on certain imported articles as provided under Republic Act No. 1937, otherwise known as the Tariff and Customs Code of the Philippines, as amended	May 8, 1974
429	Creating the Consultative Council on Muslim Affairs	May 13, 1974
430	Delegating to certain district land officers the power to sign patents and certificates	May 17, 1974
431	Extending the term of the Presidential Commission on Reorganization created under Executive Order No. 281, series of 1970	July 2, 1974
432	Creating the Filipino Muslims Welfare and Relief Agency	August 30, 1974
433	Creating a Study Committee of State Higher Education	September 11, 1974
434	Temporarily lifting the provisions of Section 514, Title III, Book I of Republic Act No. 1937, as amended, and those of Executive Order No. 425, series of 1974, with respect to wood products	October 2, 1974
435	Creating preparatory committees for the Third Ministerial Meeting of the Group of 77 of the United Nations Conference on Trade and Development (UNCTAD)	October 11, 1974
436	Modifying the rates of import duty on certain imported articles as provided under Republic Act No. 1937, otherwise known as the Tariff and Customs Code of the Philippines, as amended	October 15, 1974
437	Amending the composition of the Agrarian Reform Coordinating Council created under Executive Order No. 347, series of 1971	November 16, 1974
438	Revising the evaluation and approval procedures for bid proposals and proposed negotiated contracts of the Philippine National Railways and amending for the purpose Executive Order No. 356, dated 3 December 1971	December 2, 1974
439	Creating a national preparatory committee and designating a coordinating secretariat for the Philippine participation in Habitat: The United Nations Conference on Human Settlements in Vancouver, Canada, in 1976	December 2, 1974
440	Designating the National Irrigation Administration as the implementing agency for the Magat Multi-Purpose Project in Isabela	December 3, 1974
441	Designating the National Irrigation Administration as the implementing agency for the Jalaur River Multi-Purpose Project in Iloilo	December 17, 1974
442	Creating the Presidential Commission to Review the Code of Filipino Muslim Laws	December 23, 1974
443		December 26, 1974
444	Further amending Section 19 of Executive Order No. 135, dated May 4, 1948, entitled "Regulating the establishment, maintenance and operation of fronton and basque pelota games (jai-alai)"	December 27, 1974

== 1975 ==
No.	Title	Date signed
445	Creating a committee to look into the expenditure of funds of the Mindanao State University	January 6, 1975
446	Extending the term of the Presidential Commission on Reorganization created under Executive Order No. 281, series of 1970	January 6, 1975
447	Certifying that the production of lubricating oil (including lubricating oil base stock) as a preferred pioneer industry, be entitled to post-operative tariff protection	January 14, 1975
448	Establishing the customs zone for the Port of Cebu	February 5, 1975
449	Creating a national committee to take charge of the celebration of Philippine Independence Day on 12 June 1975	March 11, 1975
450	Removing copper and cement from the list of export products subject to duty provided for under Republic Act No. 1937, otherwise known as the "Tariff and Customs Code", as amended	March 21, 1975
451	Excluding cement from the list of export products subject to duty provided for under Republic Act No. 1937, otherwise known as the "Tariff and Customs Code", as amended	June 2, 1975
452	Extending the term of the Presidential Commission on Reorganization created under Executive Order No. 281, series of 1970	July 8, 1975
453	Creating a permanent Philippine committee for the Joint Philippine-Romanian Economic and Trade Commission	August 21, 1975
454	Conferring Cabinet rank upon the Solicitor General	September 23, 1975
455	Reconstituting the membership of the National Forestry Extension Advisory Board created under Executive Order No. 321, dated May 31, 1971	September 25, 1975
456	Modifying the rates of import duty on certain imported articles as provided under Republic Act No. 1937, otherwise known as the Tariff and Customs Code of the Philippines, as amended	October 29, 1975
457	Suspending the export duty on gold as provided under Republic Act Numbered Nineteen Hundred Thirty-Seven, otherwise known as the Tariff and Customs Code of the Philippines, as amended	November 4, 1975
458	Amending Executive Order No. 456	December 8, 1975
459	Further amending Executive Order No. 70 dated May 28, 1967, as amended by Executive Order No. 218 dated March 21, 1970	December 23, 1975

== 1976 ==
No.	Title	Date signed
461	Certifying that the production of sodium tripoly-phosphate as a preferred pioneer industry, shall be entitled to post-operative tariff protection	February 2, 1976
462	Designating the National Economic and Development Authority (NEDA) as the coordinating entity on ESCAP matters	February 10, 1976
463	Creating a national committee to take charge of the celebration of Philippine Independence Day on 12 June 1976	March 19, 1976
464		April 28, 1976
465	Creating a National Commission on Countryside Credit and Collection	April 28, 1976
466	Amending Executive Order No. 277 dated December 8, 1970, as amended by Executive Order No. 269, dated March 2, 1971, entitled "Creating the Presidential Advisory Committee on Copper Industry"	May 31, 1976
467	Amending Executive Order No. 415, series 1973, creating the National Commission on Savings	June 28, 1976
468	Creating a permanent committee for the Joint Philippine-Romanian Scientific and Technological Commission	July 14, 1976
469	Extending the term of the Presidential Commission on Reorganization created under Executive Order No. 281, series of 1970	July 14, 1976
470	Modifying the rates of import duty on certain imported articles as provided under Republic Act No. 1937, otherwise known as the Tariff and Customs Code of the Philippines, as amended	July 21, 1976
471	Creating a special committee to look into certain certificates of titles of land in Baguio City declared null and void by the court	August 9, 1976
472	Making the Chairman, Energy Development Board a member of the Cabinet	August 12, 1976
473	Making the Solicitor General a member of the Cabinet	August 12, 1976
474	Creating the Agency for the Development and Welfare of Muslims in the Philippines	October 26, 1976
475	Prescribing regulations governing the discharge or separation by administrative action of officers in the Regular Force, and reserve officers on extended tour to active duty, in the Armed Forces of the Philippines	October 28, 1976
476	Modifying the rates of import duty on certain imported articles as provided under Republic Act No. 1937, otherwise known as the Tariff and Customs Code of the Philippines, as amended	December 5, 1976
477	Extending the term of the Presidential Commission on Reorganization created under Executive Order No. 281, series of 1970	December 27, 1976
478	Extending the term of the Presidential Committee to Study Government Corporations created under Executive Order No. 464, series of 1976	December 27, 1976

== 1977 ==
No.	Title	Date signed
479	Fixing the amount of assistance to primary gold producers	February 2, 1977
480	Requiring all sectors of mass media, billboard advertisers, and operators of movie and cinemahouses to allocate spot time and/or space for informational and educational campaigns and programs on water conservation of the Government	March 18, 1977
481	Creating a committee on conference preparations and a committee on substantive matters for the Third Ministerial Session of the United Nations' World Food Council (Metro Manila, 20-24 June 1977)	March 25, 1977
482	Creating a national committee to take charge of the celebration of Philippine Independence Day on 12 June 1977	March 28, 1977
484	Modifying the rates of import duty on certain imported articles as provided under Republic Act No. 1937, otherwise known as the Tariff and Customs Code of the Philippines, as amended	April 21, 1977
485	Creating a national steering committee in connection with the nationwide observance and Philippine participation in the International Year of the Child in 1979	May 27, 1977
486	Creating an Advisory Committee for the Development of Baguio City	August 3, 1977
487	Updating the kilometer stationings of all roads	September 20, 1977
488	Amending Executive Order No. 41 dated June 24, 1963, entitled "Designating certain parcels of land situated in the barrio of San Jose, municipality of Pili, province of Camarines Sur, as the new capitol site of said province"	October 7, 1977
489	Providing for the extension of the submission of the report by the PCSGC up to December 31, 1977 by amending Executive Order No. 478, series of 1976	October 28, 1977
490	Approving the continuing automatic releases of the Coconut Consumers Stabilization Fund and the Coconut Industry Development Fund for the benefit of the coconut farmers	November 27, 1977
491	Certifying that the production of phthalic anhydride as a preferred pioneer industry, shall be entitled to post-operative tariff protection	December 13, 1977
492	Modifying the rates of import duty on certain imported articles as provided under Republic Act No. 1937, otherwise known as the Tariff and Customs Code of the Philippines, as amended, in order to implement the margins of tariff preference in accordance with the ASEAN Agreement on Preferential Trading Arrangements with respect to certain articles negotiated during the Fourth Meeting of the ASEAN Committee on Trade and Tourism	December 21, 1977

== 1978 ==
No.	Title	Date signed
493	Increasing certain administrative service fees in the Office of the President	January 5, 1978
494	Creating a special committee for the resettlement of kaingineros within the Mt. Makiling Forest Reserve	January 6, 1978
495	Establishing the rules and regulations of the Foreign Service Compensation Decree of 1978	January 13, 1978
496	Extending the term of the Presidential Commission on Reorganization created under Executive Order No. 281, series of 1970	January 31, 1978
497	Creating committees for the Fifth Session of the United Nations Conference on Trade and Development (UNCTAD V)	January 31, 1978
498	Extending the term of the Presidential Committee to Study Government Corporations created under Executive Order No. 464, series of 1976	January 31, 1978
499	Governing the release of travel taxes collected under R.A. No. 1478 and 6141 (as amended)	February 15, 1978
500	Establishing a new system of career progression for public school teachers	March 21, 1978
501	Creating a national committee to take charge of the celebration of Philippine Independence Day on 12 June 1978	March 30, 1978
502	Creating an executive committee to take charge of the planning and execution of commemorative activities for the 1978 Manuel L. Quezon National Centennial Year	April 30, 1978
503	Creating a Philippine counterpart for the Permanent Joint Philippine German Democratic Trade Committee	May 29, 1978
504	Directing the Chairman of the Commission on Audit to make an examination into the business affairs, administration and condition of payors of the Coconut Consumers Stabilization Fund Levy and of manufacturers of subsidized coconut-based products	May 31, 1978
505	Revoking Executive Order No. 287, series of 1959, and Executive Order No. 374, series of 1960, authorizing the use of low plate numbers by high Government officials	June 9, 1978
506	Extending the term of the Presidential Committee to Study Government Corporations created under Executive Order No. 464, series of 1976	June 30, 1978
507	Imposing an additional 10% sales tax on imported air-conditioning units, components and parts	July 14, 1978
508	Modifying the rates of import duty on certain imported articles as provided under Presidential Decree No. 1464, otherwise, known as the Tariff and Customs Code of 1978, in order to implement the margins of tariff preference in accordance with the ASEAN Agreement on Preferential Trading Arrangements with respect to certain articles negotiated during the Third Meeting of the Trade Preferences Negotiating Group and the Fifth and Sixth Meetings of the ASEAN Committee on Trade and Tourism	August 24, 1978
509	Creating the General Military Council	September 30, 1978
510	Creating committees in connection with the hosting by the Philippines of the 35th Session of the Economic and Social Commission for Asia and the Pacific (ESCAP)	October 16, 1978
511	Strengthening the supervisory authority of the Ministry of Education and Culture over public and private colleges and universities	October 18, 1978
512	Creating a task force on the formulation of a national action program on science and technology	October 26, 1978
513	Reorganizing the Philippine Ports Authority	November 16, 1978
514	Prescribing new salary rates for the Chairman and Members of the National Police Commission	December 19, 1978
515	Transferring the appropriations for the Pambansang Katipunan ng Kabataang Barangay ng Pilipinas from the MLGCD to the Office of the President	December 26, 1978

== 1979 ==
No.	Title	Date signed
516	Creating the Bureau of Construction and the Bureau of Maintenance in the Ministry of Public Highways	January 9, 1979
517	Adoping the Bagong Lipunan Sites and Services Program as a development strategy	January 9, 1979
518	Establishing a procedure for the preparation and approval of the operating budgets of Government owned or controlled corporations	January 23, 1979
519	Creating a Health Sciences Center as an autonomous member of the University of the Philippines system	January 24, 1979
520	Establishing the Central Tender Board, defining its powers and functions, providing funds therefor, and for other purposes	January 24, 1979
521	Modifying the rates of import duty on certain imported articles as provided under Presidential Decree No. 1464, otherwise known as the Tariff and Customs Code of 1978	January 29, 1979
522	Creating a steering committee for the Fifth Session of the United Nations Conference on Trade and Development (UNCTAD V)	February 6, 1979
523	Restructuring the Foreign Service of the Philippines	February 11, 1979
524	Extending the life of the Cement Industry Authority for another five years	February 12, 1979
525	Designating the Public Estates Authority as the agency primarily responsible for all reclamation projects	February 14, 1979
526	Providing for the rationalization of Government computer services	February 23, 1979
527	Administration of the Home Development Mutual Funds created under P.D. No. 1530	March 1, 1979
528	Extending the term of the Presidential Commission on Reorganization created under Executive Order No. 281, series of 1970	March 1, 1979
529	Extending the term of the Presidential Committee to Study Government Corporations created under Executive Order No. 464, series of 1976	March 6, 1979
530	Establishing rules and regulations for the implementation of the classification and compensation plans for the Office of the President (Proper)	March 31, 1979
531	Directing the national coordinating committee implementing Presidential Memorandum Order No. 516 as amended, to administer and manage the Kapai Settlement/Integration Project in Lanao del Sur	April 3, 1979
532	Creating a national committee to take charge of the celebration of Philippine Independence Day on June 12, 1979	April 16, 1979
533	Consolidating all price and wage fixing authority with the powers of the President	April 25, 1979
534	Modifying the rates of import duty on certain imported articles as provided under Presidential Decree No. 1464, otherwise known as the Tariff and Customs Code of 1978, in order to implement the margins of tariff preference in accordance with the ASEAN Agreement on Preferential Trading Arrangements with respect to certain articles negotiated during the Seventh Meeting of the ASEAN Committee on Trade and Tourism	April 25, 1979
535	Amending the Charter of the Home Financing Commission, renaming it as Home Financing Corporation, enlarging its powers, and for other purposes	May 3, 1979
536	Reorganizing the Board of Directors of the Philippine Export and Foreign Loan Guarantee Corporation	May 18, 1979
537	Creating the Garments and Textile Export Board, defining its powers and functions, providing funds therefor and for other purposes	May 24, 1979
538	Prescribing the administration of the Home Development Mutual Funds	June 4, 1979
539	Creating a commission to conduct an inquiry on the safety to the public of all nuclear plants in the country	June 15, 1979
540	Providing for a Philippine Foreign Trade Service Corps in the Ministry of Trade and for other purposes	June 19, 1979
541	Creating a committee to gather the memorabilia of the late Chief Justice Fred Ruiz Castro	June 19, 1979
542	Creating the Task Force Pawikan and appropriating funds thereof	June 26, 1979
543	Constituting the President's Center for Special Studies out of the Philippine Center for Advanced Studies	July 9, 1979
544	Creating a Presidential Committee for the Conservation of the Tamaraw, defining its powers and for other purposes	July 9, 1979
545	Merger of the College of Nursing and School of Nursing of the University of the Philippines	July 23, 1979
546	Creating a Ministry of Public Works and a Ministry of Transportation and Communications	July 23, 1979
547	Providing for an administrative machinery for the efficient and equitable allocation and distribution of petroleum products	July 23, 1979
548	Establishing a technology utilization support system and providing funds therefor and for other purposes	July 23, 1979
549	Creating the Office of the Commissioner for Islamic Affairs	July 23, 1979
550	Revising the rates of specific tax on gasoline	August 1, 1979
551	Directing that the powers of administrative supervision and control of the Office of the President over the Board of Energy shall be exercised through the Ministry of Energy	August 8, 1979
551-A	Creating an Executive Committee of the Cabinet	August 10, 1979
552	Elevating the Office of the Solicitor General into a ministry	August 14, 1979
553	Amending Executive Order No. 541 creating a committee to gather the memorabilia of the late Chief Justice Fred Ruiz Castro	August 14, 1979
554	Creating a Task Force on International Refugee Assistance and Administration, providing funds therefor and for other purposes	August 21, 1979
555	Extending the life of the Iron and Steel Authority and the effectivity of Presidential Decree No. 272	August 31, 1979
556	Extending the term of the Presidential Committee to Study Government Corporations created under Executive Order No. 464, series of 1976	September 4, 1979
557	Reducing the rates of duty on importation of printing equipment, spare parts thereof and printing supplies	September 5, 1979
558	Modifying the application of Executive Order No. 434, series of 1974, by imposing a 20% ad valorem duty on log exports	September 6, 1979
559	Directing strict compliance with the vital rules and regulations governing the official travel abroad of Government officials and employees, both national and local, including those in Government owned or controlled corporations	September 12, 1979
560	Amending Executive Order No. 495, entitled "Establishing the rules and regulations of the Foreign Service Compensation Decree of 1978"	September 12, 1979
561	Creating the Commission on the Settlement of Land Problems	September 21, 1979
562		October 1, 1979
563	Amending Executive Order No. 129, entitled "Providing rules and regulations governing the official travel abroad of officers and employees of the Government both national and local, including those in Government owned or controlled corporations and prescribing rates of allowances and other expenses therefor"	October 12, 1979
564	Transferring the Southern Philippines Development Administration (SPDA) from the Office of the President to the Ministry of Human Settlements and reconstituting the composition of the Board of Directors	October 16, 1979
565	Creating the Bonded Export Marketing Board	October 16, 1979
566	Providing for the appointment of the Board of Directors of the Philippine Amusement and Gaming Corporation	October 23, 1979
568	Suspension of export tax and premium duty on all mineral products	November 19, 1979
569	Authorizing the Board of Investments to extend the period of availment of incentives by, or increase the rates of tax exemptions of, registered enterprises	November 23, 1979
570	Creating a task force to undertake land assembly and official development registry activities in declared Bagong Lipunan sites and urban land reform zones	November 29, 1979
571	Delineating the functions and responsibilities of the Philippine Ports Authority and the Manila International Port Terminals, Inc. in relation to the management of the Manila International Port	December 5, 1979
572	Creating an Overseas Buying and Trading Agency	December 6, 1979
573	Abolishing the Philippine Export Council and creating the Philippine Export Advisory Council	December 7, 1979
574	Providing for the re-structuring of the organizational framework of the Ministry of Trade and, for the purpose, amending Presidential Decree Numbered Seven Hundred Twenty-One and other related laws	December 7, 1979

== 1980 ==
No.	Title	Date signed
575	Extending the term of the Presidential Commission on Reorganization created under Executive Order No. 281, series of 1970	January 4, 1980
576	Exempting promotional materials, consumables and other give-aways from customs duties and taxes for the use of delegates to international travel or tourism conventions hosted in Manila by the Ministry of Tourism	January 22, 1980
577	Creating the Rural Waterworks Development Corporation, prescribing its powers and activities, appropriating the necessary funds therefor, and for other purposes	January 12, 1980
578	Modifying the rates of import duty on certain imported articles under Section 104 of Presidential Decree No. 1464, as amended, in order to implement the concession rates of duty of the Government of the Philippines set forth in Schedule LXXV – Philippines in accordance with the conditions stipulated in the Geneva (1979) protocol to the General Agreement on Tariffs and Trade	February 7, 1980
579	Creating a National Coordinating Committee for Sports Development and prescribing the governance of the national sports associations	February 12, 1980
580	Creating an Alcohol Commission	February 16, 1980
581	Re-imposing the export tax and premium duty	March 11, 1980
582	Modifying the rates of import duty on certain imported articles as provided under Presidential Decree No. 1464, otherwise known as the Tariff and Customs Code of 1978, in order to implement the margins of tariff preference in accordance with the ASEAN Agreement on Preferential Trading Arrangements with respect to certain articles negotiated during the Fourth Meeting of the Trade Preferences Negotiating Group and the Eight Meeting of the ASEAN Committee on Trade and Tourism	March 17, 1980
583	Reconstituting the Board of Directors of the National Cottage Industries Development Authority	March 18, 1980
584	Amending Section 10 of Executive Order No. 540 providing for a Foreign Trade Service Corps in the Ministry of Trade	March 18, 1980
585	Reconstituting the Board of Censors for Motion Pictures	March 22, 1980
586	Creating the Sacobia Development Authority and for other purposes	March 25, 1980
587	Suspending the export and premium duty on all mineral products	March 25, 1980
588	Exempting the President's Center for Special Studies from the Executive Order No. 530 relative to position classification and salary rates and the rules and regulations of the Civil Service Commission	March 29, 1980
589	Adopting the Regional Development Investment Program as the implementing framework of the Five-Year Regional Development Plans	April 17, 1980
590	Directing the regional physical fitness and sports development councils to organize the regional organizing committees for the Palarong Bagong Lipunan and requiring all agencies, offices, and instrumentalities of the Government, including local governments and Government-owned or controlled corporations to actively support the efforts of the regional organizing committees formed	April 18, 1980
591	Instituting certain critical changes in the organizational structure of the Ministry of Labor	May 1, 1980
592	Creating a national committee to take charge of the celebration of Philippine Independence Day on June 12, 1980	May 3, 1980
593	Removing copra, coconut oil, copra meal or cake and desiccated coconut from the list of export products subject to duty as provided for under P.D. 1464, as amended	May 17, 1980
594	Amending the salary schedule provided under Presidential Decree No. 985	May 12, 1980
595	Transferring the function of cooperative development from the Ministry of Local Government and Community Development to the Ministry of Agriculture	May 22, 1980
596	Amending Executive Order No. 183 regarding the creation of the National Food and Agriculture Council	May 22, 1980
597	Amending Executive Order No. 592 dated May 3, 1980, creating a national committee to take charge of the celebration of Philippine Independence Day on June 12, 1980	May 29, 1980
598	Creating a Combined Economic Reporting Committee	June 10, 1980
599	Creating the Philippine Host Committee for the 1980 World Tourism Conference of the World Tourism Organization	June 10, 1980
600	Creating a Management Coordinating Board to coordinate, oversee and monitor the Third Urban Development Project	June 14, 1980
601	Establishing the Presidential Program Implementation Monitoring Center, defining its powers and functions, providing funds therefor, and for other purposes	June 17, 1980
602	Transferring the Metals Industry Research and Development Center from the National Science Development Board to the Ministry of Industry, reconstituting its Board of Trustees, and for other purposes	July 10, 1980
603	Creating the Light Rail Transit Authority, vesting the same with authority to construct and operate the Light Rail Transit (LRT) Project and providing funds therefor	July 12, 1980
604	Reconstituting the Board of Directors of the Philippine Amusements and Gaming Corporation, created under Presidential Decree No. 1067-A	July 18, 1980
605	Implementing the Regional Cities Development Project, creating for this purpose the Regional Cities Development Project Office and providing funds therefor	July 25, 1980
606	Further extending the term of the Presidential Committee to Study Government Corporations created under Executive Order No. 464, series of 1976	July 29, 1980
607	Creating a Philippine Counterpart Commission to the Hawaiian Commission for the Observance and Commemoration of the 75th Anniversary of the Arrival of the First Filipino Immigrants in Hawaii, and for other purposes	July 30, 1980
608	Reorganizing the Bureau of Internal Revenue	August 1, 1980
609	Modifying the rates of import duty on certain imported articles as provided under Presidential Decree No. 1464, otherwise known as the Tariff and Customs Code of 1978, as amended	August 1, 1980
610	Modifying the rates of import duty on certain imported articles as provided under Presidential Decree No. 1464, otherwise known as the Tariff and Customs Code of 1978, as amended, in order to implement the margins of tariff preference in accordance with the ASEAN Agreement on Preferential Trading Arrangements with respect to certain articles negotiated during the Fifth and Sixth Meetings of the Trade Preferences Negotiating Group and the Tenth Meeting of the ASEAN Committee on Trade and Tourism	August 1, 1980
611	Creating a Presidential Committee on Judicial Reorganization	August 7, 1980
612	Creating maritime attache posts in the Foreign Service	August 15, 1980
613	Transferring the Philippine Atomic Energy Commission to the Office of the President	August 15, 1980
614	Creating a National Wages Council	August 18, 1980
615	Creating a National Productivity Commission	August 18, 1980
616	Creating a national steering committee in connection with the nationwide observance of the Philippine participation in the International Year of Disabled Persons in 1981	August 21, 1980
617	Transferring all the soybean seed bank projects to the National Development Company	August 21, 1980
618	Amending Executive Orders Nos. 541 and 553 converting the committee to gather the memorabilia of the late Chief Justice Fred Ruiz Castro into a commission	September 2, 1980
619	Designating chief regional action officers and regional action officer for basic needs and services for Regions IX, X, XI, and XII	September 2, 1980
619-A	Amending Executive Order No. 611, dated August 7, 1980, creating a Presidential Committee on Judicial Reorganization	September 15, 1980
620	Reorganizing Palayan ng Bayan to Pagkain ng Bayan	September 11, 1980
621	Amending Executive Order Numbered One Hundred Thirteen, series of Nineteen Fifty-Five, establishing the classification of roads	September 18, 1980
622	Reorganization of NACIDA and its immediate transfer to the Ministry of Industry	September 20, 1980
623	Converting the Ilocos Region Fuelwood Development Program created under the Letter of Instructions No. 866 into a corporation as a subsidiary of the Philippine Virginia Tobacco Administration, redefining its functions, powers and responsibilities, and for other purposes	September 30, 1980
624	Modifying the rates of import duty on certain imported articles as provided under Presidential Decree No. 1464, otherwise known as the Tariff and Customs Code of 1978, as amended	October 2, 1980
625	Creating a National Committee on Geological Sciences	October 8, 1980
626	Further amending Executive Order No. 234 dated May 16, 1970, banning the slaughter of carabaos and buffaloes	October 21, 1980
626-A	Further amending Executive Order No. 626	October 25, 1980
627	Creating a Presidential Committee on Proposed Constitutional Amendments	October 30, 1980
628	Creating a University of the Philippines in the Visayas as an autonomous member of the University of the Philippines system	October 30, 1980
629	Abolishing the Reparations Commission and transferring its remaining activities to the Development Bank of the Philippines	October 30, 1980
630	Creating the National Identification System Committee	November 11, 1980
631	Creating the position of another Deputy Minister in the Ministry of Public Highways	November 13, 1980
632	Creating a special committee to determine the terms and conditions for the merger of the Philippine Long Distance Telephone Company (PLDT) and the Republic Telephone Company (RETELCO)	November 20, 1980
632-A	Modifying the rates of import duty on certain imported articles as provided under Presidential Decree No. 1464, otherwise known as the Tariff and Customs Code of 1978, as amended	November 28, 1980
633	Increasing the capitalization of the Human Settlements Development Corporation	November 29, 1980
634	Creating the regional cooperative development assistance offices in Regions IX and XII	December 4, 1980
635	Amending Executive Order No. 134, series of 1964 as amended, creating the Philippine National Volunteer Service Coordinating Agency	December 12, 1980
635-A	Authorizing the retention in the service of some employees of the Reparations Commission (REPACOM) and directing the Board of Liquidators to advance their salaries and other operating expenses subject to reimbursement from REPACOM funds	December 23, 1980
636	Creating a Philippine Gamefowl Commission	December 23, 1980
637	Prescribing revised administrative relationships within the Office of the President	December 26, 1980

== 1981 ==
No.	Title	Date signed
638	Amending Executive Order No. 31, entitled "Regulations governing the use of motor vehicles or other means of transportation for official purposes"	January 5, 1981
639	Abolishing the special trade representative offices in Frankfurt, West Germany and in Kuwait	January 5, 1981
640	Amending Executive Order No. 613 entitled "Transferring the Philippine Atomic Energy Commission to the Office of the President"	January 5, 1981
640-A	Prescribing guidelines to promote and enhance the preservation, growth, and development of the motion picture art and science in the Philippines	January 5, 1981
641	Creating the office of Deputy Minister of National Defense for Police Matters in the Ministry of National Defense	January 15, 1981
642	Creating the Gintong Alay Foundation, defining its functions and for other purposes	January 21, 1981
643	Providing for the general and specific administrative supervisions over the Home Development Mutual Fund	January 24, 1981
644	Modifying the rates of import duty on certain imported articles as provided under Presidential Decree No. 1464, otherwise known as the Tariff and Customs Code of 1978, as amended, in order to implement the margins of tariff preference in accordance with the ASEAN Agreement on Preferential Trading Arrangements with respect to certain articles negotiated during the Seventh Meeting of the Trade Preference Negotiating Group and the Eleventh Meeting of the ASEAN Committee on Trade and Tourism	January 26, 1981
645	Abolishing the National Fertilizer Corporation of the Philippines and transferring its functions and appropriations to the National Development Company	January 29, 1981
646	Directing the ministries and Governmental agencies concerned to render full support and assistance to the Batasang Pambansa to insure the successful hosting of the Spring Meetings of the Inter-Parliamentary Union on April 20 to 25, 1981	January 29, 1981
647	Granting of salary adjustment to officials and employees of the Bureau of Customs	February 3, 1981
648	Reorganizing the Human Settlements Regulatory Commission	February 7, 1981
649	Reorganizing the Land Registration Commission into the National Land Titles and Deeds Registration Administration and regionalizing the offices of the registrars therein	February 9, 1981
650	Restructuring the Technology Resource Center by increasing its capitalization	February 12, 1981
651	Requiring Government offices, agencies and instrumentalities to comply strictly with the laws and regulations on withholding of taxes	February 16, 1981
652	Expanding the powers of the committee created under Executive Order No. 544 series of 1979 and providing the necessary appropriations therefore	February 19, 1981
653	Further extending the term of the Presidential Committee to Study Government Corporations (PCSGC) created under Executive Order No. 464, series of 1976	February 23, 1981
654	Further defining certain functions and powers of the Public Estates Authority	February 26, 1981
655	Enjoining the widespread application of gasifier equipment for irrigation and other farm-related purposes, and designating the Farm Systems Development Corporation as the lead agency in its implementation	February 26, 1981
656	Amending Executive Order No. 81, series of 1967, creating a committee to coordinate the investigation, handling and disposition of apprehended illegal entrants and foreign vessels violating Philippine laws	February 26, 1981
657	Extending the Balikbayan Program for Overseas Filipinos for a period of five years beginning 1 March 1981 to 28 February 1986	February 28, 1981
658	Creation of a Committee on Transport Planning	February 28, 1981
659	Defining the scope of special diplomatic assignments	March 3, 1981
660	Inclusion of operating mines within the purview of Section 53 of Presidential Decree No. 463, as amended	March 4, 1981
661	Creating a task force on the accelerated BLISS development of the Tondo foreshore	March 12, 1981
662	Creating the National Dendro Development Corporation, prescribing its powers and functions, and appropriating funds therefor	March 12, 1981
663	Suspending the implementation of Executive Order No. 579 and for other purposes	March 13, 1981
664	Creating an executive committee to take charge of the planning and execution of commemorative activities for the Fall of Bataan, Fall of Corregidor and Battle of Bessang Pass	March 16, 1981
665	Government procurement of portable fire extinguishers	March 17, 1981
666	Government purchase of electrical wires, materials, components and devices manufactured by firms licensed by the Philippine Bureau of Standards	March 17, 1981
667	Upgrading further the salary schedule of the Career Executive Service provided for under Presidential Decree No. 1581	March 19, 1981
668	Granting salary increases for National Government employees	March 19, 1981
669	Granting salary increases for schools superintendents	March 19, 1981
670	Implementing Presidential Decree No. 1726 on an integrated compensation scheme for lawyers in the Ministry of Justice	March 19, 1981
671	Directing the transfer to the National Development Corporation (NDC) of all accounts payable to the Philippine National Oil Company (PNOC) in connection with the sale of the Luzon Stevedoring Corporation (LUSTEVECO) to the Construction and Development Corporation of the Philippines (CDCP)	March 19, 1981
671-A	Creating the position of an additional Deputy Minister in the Ministry of Energy	March 20, 1981
672	Revising the rates of specific tax on certain petroleum products	March 21, 1981
673	Enjoining the widespread application of gasifier equipment for vehicles and designating an inter-agency committee to oversee and regulate its implementation	March 21, 1981
674	Establishing the Research Institute for Tropical Medicine	March 25, 1981
674-A	Revising the rates of specific tax on locally produced distilled spirits, wines, compounded liquors and fermented liquors	March 31, 1981
674-B	Granting preferential ad valorem tax rates to marginal mines	March 31, 1981
675	Extending the deadline for the submission of statements of assets, liabilities and networth	April 2, 1981
676	Approving the 1981 Investment Priorities Plan	April 10, 1981
677	Amending Presidential Decree No. 1588	April 12, 1981
678	Suspending the export tax on native leaf and scrap tobacco	April 16, 1981
679	Expanding the composition of the Board of Directors of the Construction Industry Authority of the Philippines	April 21, 1981
680	Increasing the numbers of Directors of the National Development Company from seven (7) to nine (9)	April 23, 1981
681	Authorizing the hosting of the Intergovernmental Meeting on the Protection and Management of Coastal Areas of the East Asian Region and the First Asian Ministerial Meeting on the Environment	April 28, 1981
682	Creating a national committee to take charge of the celebration of Philippine Independence Day on June 12, 1981	May 3, 1981
683	Further amending Executive Order No. 31, series of 1954, as amended, to include other local government officials who are likewise entitled to the use of motor vehicles or other means of transportation for official purposes	May 4, 1981
684	Modifying the rates of import duty on certain imported articles as provided under Presidential Decree No. 1464, otherwise known as the Tariff and Customs Code of 1978, as amended	May 8, 1981
685	Changing the title of the Executive Director to Administrator and reconstitution of the Board of Governors of the National Coal Authority and for other purposes	May 5, 1981
686	Releasing appropriated funds to the National Coal Authority as Government equity contribution	May 5, 1981
687	Designating the National Power Corporation as the lead agency for the San Roque Multi-Purpose Development Project of Lower Agno River Basin at San Roque, San Manuel, Pangasinan and also as the implementing agency for the joint works	May 5, 1981
688	Aligning the Philippine tariff nomenclature and the general rules of classification provided for under Sections 104 and 203 of Presidential Decree No. 1464 in accordance with the Customs Cooperation Council nomenclature	May 9, 1981
689	Instituting a national resource export within the Ministry of Human Settlements, providing for the integrative delivery of basic needs and for other purposes	May 11, 1981
690	Extending the effectivity of Presidential Decree Numbered Seventeen Hundred Forty-Five dated November 20, 1980, as amended by Presidential Decree Numbered Seventeen Hundred Forty-Seven, dated December 4, 1980	May 11, 1981
691	Amending the last Paragraph of Letter of Implementation No. 53 dated December 27, 1976	May 15, 1981
692	Constituting the fund for the Cooperative Development Loan Fund as created by PD 175 into a special revolving fund	May 15, 1981
693	Amending Executive Order No. 682 dated May 3, 1981, creating a national committee to take charge of the celebration of Philippine Independence Day on June 12, 1981	May 20, 1981
694	Creating the Central Visayas Urban and Rural Projects Office and providing funds therefor	May 21, 1981
695	Extending the deadline for availment of tax amnesty and submission of statement of assets, liabilities and networth	May 27, 1981
696	Granting Career Executive Service Officer rank to graduates of the National Defense College of the Philippines and other related purposes	May 27, 1981
697	Creating the Ministry of Muslim Affairs	May 28, 1981
698		June 25, 1981
699		June 26, 1981
700	Transferring the Philippine Textile Research Institute from the National Science Development Board to the Ministry of Industry	June 26, 1981
701	Modifying the rates of import duty on certain imported articles as provided under Presidential Decree No. 1464, otherwise known as the Tariff and Customs Code of 1978, as amended in order to implement the 20% margin of tariff preference on items, with import value of less than US $50,000 CIF in 1978 as recorded in the foreign trade statistics of the Philippines in accordance with the Eighth and Ninth Decisions of the ASEAN Economic Ministers (AEM) Meeting	July 2, 1981
702	Modifying the rates of import duty on certain imported articles as provided under Presidential Decree No. 1464, otherwise known as the Tariff and Customs Code of 1978, as amended, in order to implement the Tenth ASEAN Economic Ministers (AEM) Decision to provide a deeper tariff cut of 20%-20% margins of tariff preference in respect to items which are already under the preferential trading arrangements (PTA)	July 2, 1981
703	Creating the Special Presidential Reorganization Committee	July 9, 1981
704	Promulgating rules for the admission to the Philippine schools of the minor children of foreign permanent residents in the Philippines under Section 9 (f) of the Philippine Immigration Law of 1940 as amended and Section 7, of Executive Order No. 104, series of 1968	July 13, 1981
705	Modifying the rates of import duty on certain imported articles as provided under Presidential Decree No. 1464, otherwise known as the Tariff and Customs Code of 1978, as amended, in order to implement the margins of preference in accordance with the ASEAN Agreement on Preferential Trading Arrangements with respect to certain articles negotiated during the Twelfth Meeting of the ASEAN Committee on Trade and Tourism	July 16, 1981
706	Modifying the rates of import duty on certain imported articles as provided under Presidential Decree No. 1464, otherwise known as the Tariff and Customs Code of 1978, as amended	July 16, 1981
707	Prescribing regulations and instructions on international competitive bidding for major industrial projects and mandatory general contract terms and conditions applicable thereto pursuant to Presidential Decree No. 1764	July 20, 1981
708	Reorganizing the Office of the President and creating the Office of the Prime Minister pursuant to the 1981 amendments to the Constitution	July 27, 1981
709	Creating a Ministry of Trade and Industry	July 27, 1981
710	Creating a Ministry of Public Works and Highways	July 27, 1981
711	Reclassifying certain agencies of the Government	July 28, 1981
712	Regulating the manufacture, sale and possession of air rifles/pistols which are considered as firearms	July 28, 1981
713		July 30, 1981
714	Fiscal control and management of the funds of the University of the Philippines	August 1, 1981
715	Establishing the Kilusang Kabuhayan at Kaunlaran as a priority program of the Government, providing for its organizational machinery, and for other purposes	August 6, 1981
716	Creating a committee to assess the competence and performance of Career Service Officers and other officers in the Civil Service	August 6, 1981
717	Amending Presidential Decree No. 694, revising the Philippine National Bank Charter	August 10, 1981
718	Amending Section Fourteen of Republic Act Numbered Eighty Five, as amended by Republic Act Numbered Three Thousand Five Hundred Seventeen and Presidential Decree Numbered Four Hundred Twenty Three	August 15, 1981
719	Defining the functions of the Special Presidential Representative for Trade Negotiations	August 19, 1981
720	Amending Executive Order No. 537 dated May 24, 1979 creating the Garments and Textile Export Board	August 19, 1981
721	Creating the Bureau of Youth Affairs, Foreign Students and Foreign Schools in the Ministry of Education and Culture and other related purposes	August 24, 1981
722	Granting salary increases for teachers	August 27, 1981
723	Revising the MFA indices on overseas and living quarters allowances of Foreign Service personnel	August 27, 1981
724	Directing the reorganization of the Philippine Coconut Authority	September 2, 1981
725	Facilitating the establishment of industrial tree plantations	September 9, 1981
726	Revising the integrated compensation scheme for uniformed personnel of the Integrated National Police	September 10, 1981
727		September 10, 1981
728	Retaining the Commission on Filipinos Overseas under the Office of the President as a critical agency, designating the Members of the Commission and providing for the organizational guidelines of the Secretary of the Commission	September 12, 1981
729	Increase in the retirement pension of officers and enlisted personnel retired or separated prior to May 1, 1979 or their surviving heirs	September 10, 1981
730	Creating the Board of Generals in the Armed Forces of the Philippines	September 10, 1981
731	Amending certain provisions of Presidential Decree No. 1378 creating the National Council on Integrated Area Development	September 16, 1981
732	Providing more financial incentives to firms and out-of-school youth participating in the KB-NMYC Batarisan In-Plant Training Program	September 21, 1981
733	Linking formal and non-formal education and training systems through an expanded accreditation and equivalency program	September 21, 1981
734	Establishing the Kilusan sa Kabuhayan at Kaunlaran (KKK) ng Kabataan as a priority program of Government in addition to the organizational machinery of the Kilusang Kabuhayan at Kaunlaran as provided for in Executive Order No. 715	September 21, 1981
735	Increasing subsistence allowance for patients confined in AFP hospitals	September 10, 1981
735-A		September 11, 1981
736	Abolishing the authentication requirement on commercial invoices	September 26, 1981
737	Creating the Kilusang Kabuhayan at Kaunlaran (KKK) Marketing Coordination Center, defining its functions and for other purposes	September 29, 1981
738	Establishing Cabinet Committee on the Treaty on the Law of the Sea	October 3, 1981
739	Creating a Debt Clearing Office to effect the judicious settlement of obligations subsisting between and among National Government offices and instrumentalities, Government-owned or controlled corporations, local government units and private individuals or corporations	October 3, 1981
740	Amending Executive Order No. 708 dated July 27, 1981	October 2, 1981
741	Designating the PANAMIN as the implementing arm of the Kilusang Kabuhayan sa Kaunlaran for National Minorities	October 6, 1981
742	Increasing the subsistence allowance of prisoners and detainees under the PC/INP custody	October 18, 1981
743	Transferring the management of the Rizal Memorial Sports Complex and the Gintong Alay Training Camp in Baguio City to Project: Gintong Alay	October 28, 1981
744	Granting salary increase for all personnel of the Bureau of Treasury	November 6, 1981
745	Changing the name of the Board of Censors for Motion Pictures to Board of Review for Motion Pictures and Television	November 13, 1981
746	Upgrading the salaries of lawyer positions and certain officials in the Office of the Tanodbayan	November 17, 1981
747	Creating a Special Committee on the Philippine Coconut Industry	November 19, 1981
748	Amending Executive Order No. 708 dated July 27, 1981	November 19, 1981
749	Declaring the Vitas Area as part of the North Harbor Port Zone under the Philippine Ports Authority	November 26, 1981
750	Amending Executive Order No. 727 dated September 10, 1981 creating the "Peace and Order Council"	November 27, 1981
751	Amending Executive Order No. 708, series of 1981	December 17, 1981
752	Granting year-end bonus to National Government officials and employees equivalent to one week's pay	December 7, 1981
753	Further amending Executive Order No. 708 dated July 27, 1981	December 9, 1981
754	Amending Executive Order No. 183 creating the National Food and Agriculture Council (NFAC), as amended by Executive Order No. 596	December 16, 1981
755	Granting enlisted personnel, draftees and trainees combat clothing while assigned or detailed with combat units	December 21, 1981
756	Authorizing the reorganization of the Philippine International Trading Corporation	December 28, 1981
757	Amending Executive Order No. 585 reconstituting the Board of Censors for Motion Pictures, which has been renamed Board of Review for Motion Pictures and Television	December 29, 1981
758	Further extending the effectivity of Presidential Decree Numbered Seventeen Hundred Forty-Five dated November 20, 1980, as amended by Presidential Decree Numbered Seventeen Hundred Forty-Seven, dated December 4, 1980 and Executive Order Numbered Six Hundred Ninety, dated May 11, 1981	December 31, 1981

== 1982 ==
No.	Title	Date signed
759	Establishing rules and regulations for a Copper Stabilization Fund	January 7, 1982
760	Modifying the rates of import duty on certain imported articles as provided under Presidential Decree No. 1464, as amended, in order to implement the decision taken by the Eleventh ASEAN Economic Ministers (AEM) Meeting for an initial tariff cut of 50% for products in the AEAN Industrial Complementation (AIC) Package	January 8, 1982
761	Lifting the suspension of the export duty on copra and reducing the export duty thereon to seven percent	January 8, 1982
762	Relieving the Complaints and Investigation Office of its function as the administrative arm of the Tanodbayan	January 8, 1982
763	Creating an additional position of Deputy Minister of Transportation and Communications	January 11, 1982
764	Revising the MFA indices on overseas and living quarters allowances of Foreign Service personnel in Bonn and Hamburg, Federal Republic of Germany	January 13, 1982
765	Granting certain incentives to domestic manufacturers bidding in Government projects financed out of foreign loans	January 13, 1982
766	Transferring the administrative control of the Real Property Tax Administration (RPTA) Project from the Ministry of Local Government and Community Development to the Ministry of Finance	January 13, 1982
767	Providing for increased participation of local governments in the national infrastructure program	January 14, 1982
768	Amending further the composition of the Board of Directors of the Construction Industry Authority of the Philippines	January 19, 1982
769	Concerning the shipment of sea-borne import and export cargoes of the Philippines	January 19, 1982
770	Creating the Experimental Cinema of the Philippines	January 29, 1982
771	Amending Executive Order No. 696 granting Career Executive Service officer rank to graduates of the National Defense College and other related purposes	February 14, 1982
772	Amending Presidential Decree No. 997 creating the Philippine Fish Marketing Authority, defining its functions and powers, and for other purposes	February 8, 1982
773	Creating an Export Development Fund	February 10, 1962
774	Creating a National Executive Committee on Aging	February 19, 1981
775	Increasing the number of Directors of the National Development Company to include the Minister of Natural Resources	February 25, 1982
776		February 24, 1982
777	Reorganizing the Ministry of Local Government and Community Development, renaming it as Ministry of Local Government and transferring its community development function to the Ministry of Human Settlements and for other purposes	February 28, 1982
778	Creating the Manila International Airport Authority, transferring existing assets of the Manila International Airport to the authority, and vesting the authority with power to administer and operate the Manila International Airport	March 4, 1982
779	Classifying the organizational structure of the Rural Workers Office in the Ministry of Labor and Employment	March 9, 1982
780	Authorizing increases in salary to solicitors and lawyers in the Office of the Solicitor General	March 9, 1982
781	Accelerating the implementation of the Kilusang Kabuhayan at Kaunlaran and establishing thereby a special local government KKK fund, appropriating funds therefor and for other purposes	March 9, 1982
782	Creating an inter-agency committee to monitor and regulate the importation of used trucks and engines	March 13, 1982
783	Amending further the composition of the Board of Directors of the Maritime Industry Authority and the Philippine Ports Authority	March 16, 1982
784	Reorganizing the National Science Development Board and its agencies into a National Science and Technology Authority and for related purposes	March 17, 1982
785	Creating the Philippine Human Resource Development Center, providing funds therefor and for other purposes	March 19, 1982
786	Creating the Natural Resources Development Corporation, defining its functions, powers and responsibilities and for other purposes	March 19, 1982
787	Creating the Middle East and Africa Regional Labor Office and for other purposes	March 25, 1982
788	Prescribing the initial clothing allowance in kind and new rate of clothing maintenance allowance of the cadets of the Philippine Military Academy and the Philippine Air Force Flying School	March 28, 1982
789	Increasing the subsistence allowance of cadets of the Philippine Military Academy and of the Philippine Air Force Flying School	March 28, 1982
790	Extending the preference to any one child of a veteran in Civil Service examinations	April 3, 1982
791	Creating a national committee to take charge of the celebration of Philippine Independence Day on June 12, 1982	April 11, 1982
792	Implementing the final 25% increase in distilled spirits, wines, compounded liquors and fermented liquors pursuant to BP Blg. 82	April 11, 1982
793	Authorizing the increase in salaries of Metropolitan Manila Commission officials and mayors/vice mayors of the cities of Manila, Quezon, Pasay and Caloocan	April 11, 1982
794		April 6, 1982
795	Creating the Philippine Commission for the International Youth Year and defining its powers and functions	May 3, 1982
796	Amending the composition of the Board of Trustees of the Metropolitan Waterworks and Sewerage System	May 6, 1982
797	Reorganizing the Ministry of Labor and Employment, creating the Philippine Overseas Employment Administration, and for other purposes	May 1, 1982
798	Creating the Justice System Consultative Commission (JUSCCOM)	May 14, 1982
799	Modifying the rates of import duty on certain imported articles as provided under Presidential Decree No. 1464, as amended, otherwise known as the Tariff and Customs Code of 1982, in order to implement the 20%-25% margin of tariff preference on items with import value of $50,000 to $500,000 CIF 1978, as recorded in the foreign trade statistics of the Philippines, in accordance with the Eleventh and Twelfth Decisions of the ASEAN Economic Ministers (AEM) Meetings	May 19, 1982
800	Modifying the rates of import duty on certain imported articles as provided under Presidential Decree No. 1464, as amended, otherwise known as the Tariff and Customs Code of 1982, in order to implement the margins of preference in accordance with the ASEAN Agreement on Preferential Trading Arrangements with respect to certain articles negotiated during the Thirteenth Meeting of the ASEAN Committee on Trade and Tourism	May 19, 1982
801	Upgrading the physicians classes of positions in the National Government	May 21, 1982
802	Amending Regulation No. 33 (A) of Letter of Implementation No. 23, as amended	May 21, 1982
803	Establishing an integrated area management system for agricultural services	May 21, 1982
804	Providing for assistance to the Prime Minister to perform inspectorate and other related functions	May 26, 1982
805	Abolishing the Ministry of Youth and Sports Development, transferring its functions to a Ministry of Education, Culture and Sports, and for other purposes	May 26, 1982
806	Creating the Textbook Council and the Instructional Materials Corporation, defining their powers and functions and for other purposes	May 27, 1982
807	Establishing the small contractors module under the Kilusang Kabuhayan at Kaunlaran and for other purposes	June 10, 1982
808	Amending Letter of Instruction No. 1106 governing the admission to or stay in the Philippines as temporary visitors of Chinese nationals who are holders of Taipei passports	June 11, 1982
809	Amending Letter of Instruction No. 1193 governing the admission to or stay in the Philippines as temporary visitors of Chinese nationals who are holders of People's Republic of China passports	June 11, 1982
810	Granting salary increases to teaching positions of the Philippine Science High School (PSHS) as an accelerated implementation of the 1979 salary survey	June 12, 1982
811	Creating the Films Ratings Board, defining its powers and functions and for other purposes	June 12, 1982
812	Extending the period for the 1981–82 general revision of real property assessment from June 30, 1982 to June 30, 1984 and fixing the date of accrual of the real property tax based on the revised property valuations	June 22, 1982
813	Establishing the system of position classification and compensation for the Office of the Prime Minister (Proper) as well as the rules and regulations for its implementation	June 22, 1982
814	Expanding the program for the appointment of consuls ad honorem	June 26, 1982
815	To safeguard and promote the development of the Philippine Semiconductor Electronics Industry	June 26, 1982
816	Providing for the abolition of the Agricultural Credit Administration and transferring its functions to the Land Bank of the Philippines	July 8, 1982
817	Providing for the abolition of certain inactive Government corporations	July 8, 1982
818	Amending Presidential Decree No. 1003-A, creating the National Academy of Science and Technology and for other purposes	July 16, 1982
819	Creating the position of Presidential Regional Monitoring Officer in every region	July 24, 1982
820	Creating a national committee to initiate and conduct the first national seminer-workshop on monitoring and evaluation for effective program and project implementation	July 24, 1982
821	Creating the Markets Infrastructure Development Council vesting the same with powers and functions, providing appropriations therefor and for other purposes	August 3, 1982
822	Granting all the uniformed members of the Integrated National Police quarters allowance	August 8, 1982
823	Further amending Executive Order No. 537 dated May 24, 1979 creating the Garments and Textile Export Board, abolishing the Embroidery and Apparel Control and Inspection Board, and for other purposes	August 19, 1982
824	Adopting the revised rules and regulations for basque pelota games and for other purposes	August 28, 1982
825	Ordering and authorizing the organization of the Coconut Investment Company as a private corporation under the provisions of Republic Act Numbered Six Thousand Two Hundred Sixty (R.A. 6260)	August 28, 1982
826	Providing measures for the protection of the desiccated coconut industry	August 28, 1982
827		September 1, 1982
828	Temporarily suspending the exportation of copra	September 11, 1982
829		September 11, 1982
830	Increasing the capitalization of the Light Rail Transit Authority from five hundred million pesos to three billion pesos	September 30, 1982
831	Creating the Philippine-United States Business Development Council	September 30, 1982
832	Further amending Executive Order No. 708, dated July 27, 1981	October 1, 1982
833	Certifying that the production of fiberglass insulating materials, as a preferred pioneer industry, shall be entitled to post-operative tariff protection	October 1, 1982
834	Creating a National Board on the SEAFDEC Aquaculture Department Programs, Budget and Operations	October 14, 1982
835	Providing for a Revised Charter of the National Council on Integrated Area Development	October 14, 1982
836	Providing for separate positions of Chairman and General Manager in the Philippine Tobacco Administration	October 14, 1982
837	Vesting the jurisdiction, control and regulation over the watershed areas of the Manito, Albay and Bacon, Sorsogon Geothermal Reservation established under Proclamation No. 2036-A with the Ministry of Energy, pursuant to the provision of Presidential Decree No. 1515, as amended by Presidential Decree No. 1749	October 14, 1982
838	Revising the percentage tax on sales of automobiles under Section 195 (A) of the National Internal Revenue Code of 1977, as amended	October 20, 1982
839	Directing the reorganization of the National Food Authority	October 26, 1982
840	Completion of the National Agriculture and Life Sciences Research Complex at the University of the Philippines at Los Baños	October 16, 1982
841	Creating the Kabataang Barangay National Secretariat, defining its powers and functions, providing for its organizational structure and for other purposes	October 28, 1982
842	Creation of the National Development Fund	November 5, 1982
843	Creating a Commission on Export Procedures	November 5, 1982
844	Increasing the number of Directors of the National Power Corporation from seven (7) to nine (9)	November 8, 1982
845	Creating a Foreign Investments Assistance Center	November 8, 1982
846	Amending Executive Order No. 827 dated September 1, 1982	November 10, 1982
847	Creating a Drugs Intelligence Coordinating Committee	November 17, 1982
848	Reorganizing the management board of all Philippine Centers in the United States of America	November 19, 1982
849	Increasing the loan value and guarantee coverage under the Food Quedan Financing Program and for other purposes	November 26, 1982
850	Reorganizing the Ministry of Foreign Affairs	December 1, 1982
851	Reorganizing the Ministry of Health, integrating the components of health care delivery into its field operations, and for other purposes	December 2, 1982
852	Providing for more effective coordination between national development and security operations	December 3, 1982
853	Creating a committee to take charge of the planning and execution of the commemorative activities for the 1984 Teodoro M. Kalaw Centennial Anniversary	December 6, 1982
854	Providing for the rationalization of the desiccated coconut industry	December 6, 1982
855	Amending Paragraph 21 of Executive Order Number One, dated July Four, Nineteen Hundred and Forty-Six, entitled: "Prescribing rules and regulations for the granting and issuing of passports"	December 10, 1982
856	Creating a provincial/city committee on justice in other regional areas	December 12, 1982
857	Governing the remittance to the Philippines of foreign exchange earnings of Filipino workers abroad and for other purposes	December 13, 1982
858	Granting year-end bonus to National Government officials and employees equivalent to one-week's basic pay	December 14, 1982
859	Amending Executive Order No. 674 establishing the Research Institute for Tropical Medicine	December 14, 1982
860	Imposing an additional duty of three percent (3%) ad valorem on all imports	December 21, 1982
861	Further extending the effectivity of Presidential Decree Numbered Seventeen Hundred Forty-Five dated November 20, 1980, as amended by Presidential Decree Numbered Seventeen Hundred Forty-Seven, dated December 4, 1980, Executive Order Numbered Six Hundred Ninety, dated May 11, 1981, and Executive Order Numbered Seven Hundred Fifty Eight, dated December 31, 1981	December 22, 1982
862	Suspending the export duty and premium duty on centrifugal sugar and molasses	December 22, 1982
863	Revising the retail prices and specific taxes on local and imported cigarettes	December 26, 1982

== 1983 ==
No.	Title	Date signed
864	Declaring the reorganization of the Judiciary pursuant to Batas Pambansa Blg. 129 creating the Intermediate Appellate Court; the regional trial courts, the metropolitan trial courts, municipal circuit trial courts and municipal trial courts, and abolishing the Court of Appeals, the courts of first instance, juvenile and domestic relations courts, circuit criminal courts, courts of agrarian relations and all city and municipal courts and municipal circuit courts; and approving the staffing pattern and compensation scheme for the new courts, etc.	January 17, 1983
865	Modifying the rate of duty on certain imported articles as provided under the Tariff and Customs Code of 1982	January 10, 1983
866	Creating the KKK Processing Center Authority, providing funds therefor and for other purposes	January 11, 1983
867	Creating a Ministry of Labor and Employment Zonal Extension Office at the Bataan Export Processing Zone	January 30, 1983
868	Reorganizing the Board of Review for Motion Pictures and Television created under Republic Act No. 3060, as renamed and reconstituted under Executive Orders Nos. 585, 745 and 757, and expanding its functions, powers and duties	February 1, 1983
869	Amending Executive Order No. 577 renaming the rural waterworks associations as rural waterworks and sanitation associations and for other purposes	February 2, 1983
870	Creating an inter-agency committee to review, evaluate and manualize policies, rules and regulations of ministries and other agencies as well as for other purposes	February 10, 1983
871	Creating the Philippine Dendro Gasifier Corporation and providing funds therefor	February 12, 1983
872	Limiting the tax credit to taxes actually paid in computing sales tax on manufactured articles	February 16, 1983
873	Abolishing the Data Processing Center of the Bureau of Internal Revenue	February 16, 1983
874	Prescribing guidelines for the management and disposition of the People's Technology Complex and for other purposes	February 12, 1983
875	Amending Section 3 of Executive Order No. 543 constituting the President's Center for Special Studies	February 19, 1983
876	Amending Executive Order No. 868 which reorganized the Board of Review for Motion Pictures and Television	February 18, 1983
876-A	Reorganizing the Board of Review for Motion Pictures and Television created under Republic Act No. 3060, as renamed and reconstituted under Executive Orders Nos. 585, 745 and 757 and expanding its functions, powers and duties	August 5, 1983
877	Authorizing the reorganization of the Philippine International Trading Corporation created under Presidential Decree No. 1071, as amended	February 18, 1983
878	Reorganizing the Office of the Government Corporate Counsel	March 4, 1983
879	Directing the propagation of the Filipino ideology and creating a committee to evolve, supervise and monitor the implementation of the program for its dissemination	March 1, 1983
880	Declaring the establishment of a coconut chemical industry as a means to rationalize the coconut industry of the Philippines and granting additional incentives therefor	March 4, 1983
881	Authorizing as an emergency measure, the importation of liquefied petroleum gas free from customs duties and the Consumer Price Equalization Fund payment	March 15, 1983
882	Modifying the rates of import duty on certain imported articles as provided under Presidential Decree No. 1464, as amended, otherwise known as the Tariff and Customs Code of 1978, in order to implement the 20%-25% margins of tariff preference on items with import value of over $1,000,000 to $2,500,000 (CIF) in 1978, as recorded in the foreign trade statistics of the Philippines, in accordance with the decisions of the Thirteenth and Fourteenth ASEAN Economic Ministers (AEM) Meetings	March 16, 1983
883	Adopting a 25% uniform mark-up in the imposition of the advance sales tax	March 16, 1983
884	Unifying the specific tax rates on domestic and imported cinematographic films regardless of measurement	March 16, 1983
885	Modifying the rates of import duty on certain imported articles as provided under Presidential Decree No. 1464, as amended, otherwise known as the Tariff and Customs Code of 1982, in order to implement the margins of the preference in accordance with the ASEAN Agreement on Preferential Trading Arrangements with respect to certain articles negotiated during the Fourteenth Meeting of the ASEAN Committee on Trade and Tourism	March 16, 1983
886	Modifying the rates of import duty on certain imported articles as provided under Presidential Decree No. 1464, as amended, otherwise known as the Tariff and Customs Code of 1978, in order to implement the 20%-25% margins of tariff preference on items with import value of over $500,000 to $1,000,000 (CIF) in 1978, as recorded in the foreign trade statistics of the Philippines, in accordance with the decision of the Thirteenth ASEAN Economic Ministers (AEM) Meeting	March 16, 1983
887	Amending Executive Order No. 795 creating the Philippine Commission for the International Youth Year and for other purposes	March 18, 1983
888	Authorizing ministers and heads of ministries/agencies to dispose of, their respective unserviceable equipment and disposable property	March 18, 1983
889	Establishing a system of National Centers of Excellence in the Basic Sciences	March 23, 1983
890	Further amending the Charter of the Philippine Deposit Insurance Corporation	April 8, 1983
891	Prescribing the manner of implementation of the terms and conditions of the donations to the Republic of the Philippines by Eduardo M. Cojuangco Jr.	April 11, 1983
892	Structuring the annual budget and operations of the Philippine Centers in the United States of America under the Philippine-United States Business Development Council	April 13, 1983
893	Amending certain provisions of Presidential Decree No. 1631 creating the Lungsod ng Kabataan	April 21, 1983
894	Modifying Executive Order No. 860 by setting aside for the Consumer Price Equalization Fund (CPEF) the additional 3% ad valorem duty collected on crude oil and finished petroleum product imports	April 22, 1983
895	Creating employee-management committees in all Government-owned and controlled corporations and an Employee-Management Consultative Council in the Civil Service Commission	May 1, 1983
896	Declaring basic policies and guidelines for the promotion and development of domestic tourism	May 11, 1983
897	Declaring as a national policy the development and promotion of the Philippines as a center for world congresses and conventions	May 11, 1983
898	Reorganizing the Committee on Transportation Cooperatives and broadening its powers and functions	May 28, 1983
899	Revoking Executive Order No. 894, series of 1983, which set aside for the Consumer Price Equalization Fund (CPEF) the additional 3% ad valorem duty collected on crude oil and finished petroleum product imports	June 23, 1983
900	Revising the rates of specific tax on certain petroleum products	June 1, 1983
901	Prescribing rules and regulations to implement the Scientific Career System initially in the National Science and Technology Authority	July 19, 1983
902	Declaring the National Science and Technology Authority as critical agency	July 19, 1983
903	Providing for a revision of Executive Order No. 778 creating the Manila International Airport Authority, transferring existing assets of the Manila International Airport to the authority, and vesting the authority with power to administer and operate the Manila International Airport	July 21, 1983
904	Modifying the composition of the Board of Directors of the Philippine Aerospace Development Corporation	July 28, 1983
905	Entitling officers and men of the Integrated National Police to accumulate and commute, subject to certain conditions, leave credits, and for other purposes	August 1, 1983
906	Directing the review of the Progressive Car Manufacturing Program (PCMP)	August 4, 1983
907	Creating the Central Visayas Regional Projects Office	September 10, 1983
908	Constituting the Presidential Staff for Policy Research and Documentation	September 14, 1983
909	Amending Section 7 of Executive Order No. 778, creating the Manila International Airport Authority, by increasing the membership in the Board of Directors to nine members	September 16, 1983
910	Nationalizing the salaries of and adopting a standard staffing pattern for the support staff of provincial/city fiscals' offices	September 22, 1983
911	Creating a committee to take charge of the solicitation of World War II war relics, mementos, and other memorabilia from all sources for the purpose of sending the same or replicas thereof to be displayed permanently at the Museum of the Presidio of San Francisco, California, United States of America	September 27, 1983
912	Repealing Sections 3, 4 and 5 of Presidential Decree No. 1745 dated November 10, 1980, as amended	September 27, 1983
913	Strengthening the rule-making and adjudicatory powers of the Minister of Trade and Industry in order to further protect consumers	October 7, 1983
914	Extending the life of the Cement Industry Authority and making it the sole authority to establish prices of cement	October 15, 1983
915	Transferring the balance and receivables of the Filipino Retailers' Fund to the Cottage Industry Guarantee and Loan Fund (CIGLF)	October 15, 1983
916	Extending of the period for revalidation of certificates of registration of NACIDA cottage industries producers	October 15, 1983
917	Amending the definition of "cottage industry"	October 15, 1983
918	Amending Executive Order No. 860, series of 1982	November 3, 1983
919	Revising the rates of specific tax on certain petroleum products	November 3, 1983
920	Levying an export duty on certain export products and an export duty in addition to the export duties provided for under Presidential Decree No. 1464, as amended, on other export products	November 3, 1983
920-A	Amending Executive Order No. 920, series of 1983, entitled "Levying an export duty on certain export products and an export duty in addition to the export duties provided for under Presidential Decree No. 1464, as amended, on other export products"	November 14, 1983
921	Entitling CIS civilian regular agents of the Philippine Constabulary and civilian agents of other intelligence units of the AFP to accumulate and commute, subject to certain conditions, leave credits, and for other purposes	November 2, 1983
922	Granting an additional cost-of-living allowance to Government employees	November 3, 1983
923	Amending Sections 145, 146, 147, 157 and 177 of Title IV (Specific Tax) of the National Internal Revenue Code, as amended	November 8, 1983
924	Revising the retail prices and specific taxes on local and imported cigarettes	November 10, 1983
925	Amending Section 2 (A) of Executive Order No. 857 entitled "Governing the remittance to the Philippines of foreign exchange earnings of Filipino workers abroad and for other purposes"	November 22, 1983
926	Modifying the rates of duty on certain imported articles as provided under Presidential Decree No. 1464, as amended, otherwise known as the Tariff and Customs Code of 1978	December 11, 1983
927	Further defining certain functions and powers of the Laguna Lake Development Authority	December 16, 1983
928	Creating the Advisory and Administrative Support Office for the Philippine representation in the Military Bases Agreement Joint Committee	December 28, 1983

== 1984 ==
No.	Title	Date signed
929	Creating a committee to organize the Palarong Pilipino	January 6, 1984
930	Creating a decoration known as the Bayani ng Bagong Republika	January 6, 1984
931	Placing the Asian Exchange Center, Inc., including its branch office in Taipei, under the Office of the President	January 16, 1984
932	Streamlining and expediting the procedures governing the admission or stay in the Philippines, as temporary visitors, of holders of Hongkong British passports or Macao Portuguese passports or certificates of identity, or holders of People's Republic of China (PROC) or Republic of China (Taiwan) passports	January 19, 1984
933	Exempting promotional materials, consumables and other give-aways from customs duties and taxes for the use of delegates to the 8th World Congress of Anaesthesiologists hosted by the Philippine Society of Anaesthesiologists	January 20, 1984
934	Creating a Presidential Anti-Dollar Salting Task Force	February 13, 1984
935	Amending Section 5(A) of Executive Order No. 857 entitled "Governing the remittance to the Philippines of foreign exchange earnings of Filipino workers abroad and for other purposes"	February 28, 1984
936	Providing for the establishment of a Government corporate monitoring and coordinating system	February 29, 1984
937	Vesting in the Bureau of Internal Revenue the primary responsibility of enforcing the collection of national internal revenue taxes through the banking system	March 1, 1984
938	Establishing the overseas offices of the Commission on Filipinos Overseas pursuant to Section 4 of Batas Pambansa Blg. 79	March 2, 1984
939	Directing the National Manpower and Youth Council to implement the Sariling Sikap Program using its existing resources	March 2, 1984
940	Optimizing the use of existing training and educational resources through the establishment of a vocational technical (voctech) network of training and educational institutions on a voluntary and cooperative basis	March 2, 1984
941	Implementing the Ilocos Norte Development Program, providing funds therefor and for other purposes	March 9, 1984
942	Reorganizing the National Bureau of Investigation	March 13, 1984
943	Providing for an additional career Deputy Minister in the Ministry of Human Settlements who shall assist in the administration of the National Capital Region	March 13, 1984
944	Providing for an additional career Deputy Minister in the Ministry of Agriculture	March 14, 1984
945	Providing that the Chairman of the Philippine Coconut Authority shall have the rank of Minister	March 26, 1984
946	Amending Executive Order No. 918, series of 1983	March 29, 1984
947	Amending Sections 145, 146 and 147 of Title IV (Specific Tax) of the National Internal Revenue Code of 1977, as amended	March 29, 1984
948	Providing for compensatory benefits to disaster volunteer worker engaged in emergency operations	April 23, 1984
949	Increasing medicare allowances	May 1, 1984
950	Reinstating the tax exemption on donations from fraternal labor organizations under Article 243 of the Labor Code of the Philippines	May 1, 1984
951	To exempt the income and properties of rural workers organizations from taxes duties and other assessments	May 1, 1984
951-A	Granting salary increases for National Government employees	May 1, 1984
952	Amending Executive Orders No. 537 And No. 823, and for other purposes	May 4, 1984
953	Strengthening the Presidential Anti-Dollar Salting Task Force	May 4, 1984
954	Creating the position of Executive Vice President in the Polytechnic University of the Philippines	May 4, 1984
955	Imposing an additional duty of ten per cent (10%) ad valorem on imports	June 6, 1984
956	Directing additional budgetary savings and economy measures	June 6, 1984
957	Amending Sections 153, 155 and 156 of Title IV (Specific Tax) of the National Internal Revenue Code of 1977, as amended	June 6, 1984
958	Revising the maximum retail prices of cigarettes	June 6, 1984
959	Revising the percentage tax on locally produced crude oil	June 11, 1984
960	Imposing an ad valorem tax on cigarettes in addition to the specific tax levied thereon	June 11, 1984
961	Modifying the rates of import duty on certain imported articles as provided under Presidential Decree No. 1464, as amended, otherwise known as the Tariff and Customs Code of 1978, in order to implement the decisions of the Fifteenth ASEAN Economic Ministers (AEM) and the Seventeenth Committee on Trade and Tourism (COTT) Meeting to provide additional margins of preference in respect to items which are under the preferential trading arrangements (PTA)	June 14, 1984
962	Creating the National Information Council	June 20, 1984
963	Authorizing the reorganization of the Metropolitan Waterworks and Sewerage System	June 20, 1984
964	Modifying the rates of import duty on certain imported articles as provided under Presidential Decree No. 1464, as amended, in order to implement the margins of preference in accordance with the ASEAN Agreement on Preferential Trading Arrangements with respect to certain articles negotiated during the Fifteenth and Sixteenth Meetings of the ASEAN Committee on Trade and Tourism	June 20, 1984
965	Modifying the rates of import duty on certain imported articles as provided under Presidential Decree No. 1464, as amended, otherwise known as the Tariff and Customs Code of 1978, in order to implement the 20%-25% margins of tariff preference on items with import values of over $2,500,000 to $10,000,000 (CIF) in 1978, as recorded in the foreign trade statistics of the Philippines, in accordance with the decisions of the Fourteenth ASEAN Economic Ministers (AEM) Meeting and the Fifteenth Meeting of the Committee on Trade and Tourism	June 20, 1984
966	Adopting a uniform procedure in the implementation of laws for optional retirement of officers and employees of the National Government and directing expeditious payment of retirement benefits	June 22, 1984
967	Renaming the Ministry of Agriculture as the Ministry of Agriculture and Food, transferring to it certain agencies engaged in food production, and for other purposes	June 30, 1984
968	Merging the Office of the Solicitor General with the Ministry of Justice	June 30, 1984
969	Creating the Office of Muslim Affairs and Cultural Communities	June 30, 1984
970	Prescribing the manner of assessing and collecting the duty on the export of coconut products as prescribed in Executive Order No. 920-A, series of 1983	July 17, 1984
971	Establishing a reward system for information leading to the discovery and seizure of copra and or other coconut products attempted to be brought out or exported from the territorial jurisdiction of the country in accordance with the provisions of Presidential Decree No. 1464, as amended	July 17, 1984
972	Amending Executive Order No. 767 on the participation of local governments in the implementation of the national infrastructure program	July 17, 1984
973	Establishing a Cabinet Standing Committee	July 17, 1984
974	Further amending Executive Order No. 920, series of 1983, entitled "Levying an export duty on certain export products and an export duty in addition to the export duties provided for under Presidential Decree No. 1464, as amended, on other export products"	July 24, 1984
975	Directing additional budgetary savings and economy measures	August 1, 1984
976	Providing for an expanded yellow corn production assistance program, and for other purposes	August 1, 1984
977	Amending Executive Order No. 960 entitled "Imposing an ad valorem tax on cigarettes in addition to the specific tax levied thereon"	August 22, 1984
978	Imposing an ad valorem tax and revising the specific tax rates and maximum retail prices of cigarettes	August 22, 1984
979	Modifying the rates of import duty on certain imported articles as provided under Presidential Decree No. 1464, as amended, in order to implement the margins of tariff preference in accordance with the ASEAN Agreement on Preferential Trading Arrangements with respect to certain articles negotiated during the Seventeenth Meeting of the ASEAN Committee on Trade and Tourism	August 25, 1984
980	Providing for the reorganization of the Philippine Atomic Energy Commission, and for other related purposes	August 29, 1984
981	Creating an inter-agency committee on the development of fishery and allied industries as a component of the socio-economic development program for the municipality of Morong, province of Bataan	August 29, 1984
982	Directing and authorizing the reorganization of the National Power Corporation and the creation of subsidiaries and of a separate nuclear company and for other purposes	September 11, 1984
983	Increasing the subsistence allowance of prisoners and detainees under the custody of the Philippine Constabulary/Integrated National Police	September 13, 1984
984	Transferring the Philippine Atmospheric, Geophysical and Astronomical Services Aadministration to the National Science and Technology Authority, providing for its reorganization, and for other purposes	September 17, 1984
985	Granting additional cost-of-living allowance (COLA) to Government officials and employees	September 18, 1984
986	Exempting the personnel of the Research Institute for Tropical Medicine from the rules and regulations of the Office of Compensation and Position Classification and for other purposes	September 28, 1984
987	Increasing the daily subsistence allowance of military personnel of the Armed Forces of the Philippines to twelve pesos (₱12.00) per day	October 4, 1984
988	Amending Executive Order No. 955, series of 1984, by reducing the rate prescribed therein to five per cent (5%)	October 10, 1984
989	Further strengthening the Export Promotion Program through the institutionalization of Philippine Trade Exhibition Center	October 10, 1984
990	Allowing sales tax credits on raw material purchases against quarterly sales taxes without taking into account raw material, work-in-process and finished goods inventories	October 10, 1984
991	Governing the enforcement of Government approved employment contracts of Filipino contract workers working overseas	October 17, 1984
992	Philippine Exporters Foundation	October 18, 1984
993	Increasing the daily subsistence allowance of uniformed members of the Integrated National Police to twelve pesos (₱12.00) per day	October 18, 1984
994	Creating an additional position or Deputy Minister in the Ministry of Justice	November 5, 1984
995	Granting certain exemptions, privileges and immunities to the ASEAN Crops Post-Harvest Programme and foreign nationals of its technical team	November 13, 1984
996	Revising the percentage tax rate on locally produced crude oil	November 13, 1984
997	Granting year-end bonus to National Government officials and employees equivalent to two-week basic pay but not less than ₱500 nor more than ₱1,000	November 26, 1984

== 1985 ==
No.	Title	Date signed
998	Creating an ad hoc committee to evaluate and study the country's various sports programs	January 11, 1985
999	Further amending Subparagraphs (A), (B) and (C) of Section Twenty-Three and Subparagraphs (A) and (D) of Section 45 of the National Internal Revenue Code of 1977, as amended	January 19, 1985
1000	Granting salary increases for Government officials and employees	January 25, 1985
1001	Transferring the administrative supervision of the Presidential Committee for the Conservation of Tamaraw and the Calawit Special Project of the Ministry of Agriculture and Food	January 25, 1985
1002	Declaring the accrued income from AFP operations and exercise of regulatory functions as trust receipts and granting the Chief of Staff, AFP the authority in the use thereof as an exemption from Section 50 or Presidential Decree 1177	January 25, 1985
1003	Granting combat clothing to CHDFs engaged in combat operations and headquarters personnel assigned in the field as an amendment to Executive Order Nr. 755 dated December 21, 1981, granting enlisted personnel, draftees and trainees combat clothing clothing while assigned or detailed with combat units	January 25, 1985
1004	Prescribing the effective implementation of the national civic action programs of the Government as an amendment to Executive Order No. 972 further amending Executive Order No. 767	January 28, 1985
1005	Amending Chapter XXIV (Section 105 thru 109) of Executive Order No. 178, dated December 17, 1938, otherwise known as the "Manual for Courts-Martial, Armed Forces of the Philippines"	January 28, 1985
1006	Amending Section 1 of Executive Order No. 993 increasing the daily subsistence allowance of uniformed members of the Integrated National Police to twelve pesos (₱12.00) per day	January 30, 1985
1007	Increasing the composition of the Board of Pardons and Parole created under Act Numbered Four Thousand One Hundred and Three, as amended, otherwise known as the Indeterminate Sentence Law, and increasing the compensation of the members thereof	January 31, 1985
1008	Creating an arbitration machinery in the construction industry of the Philippines	February 4, 1985
1009	Strengthening the policy formulating capability of the Civil Aeronautics Board	February 20, 1985
1010	Amending Executive Order No. 23, dated March 25, 1936, entitled "Description and specifications of the Filipino flag"	February 25, 1985
1011	Establishing the Land Transportation Commission in the Ministry of Transportation and Communications, and for other purposes	March 20, 1985
1012	Providing measures to improve the administrative and operational framework for maintaining peace and order at the provincial, city and municipal levels	March 22, 1985
1013	Delineating the jurisdiction of the Ministries of Natural Resources and Trade and Industry over forest products	March 22, 1985
1014	Institutionalizing active participation of the private sector through the Presidential Productivity Council, in the formulation of the country's development plans and programs	March 22, 1985
1015	Increasing the subsistence allowance of patients confined in AFP/INP hospitals and dispensaries and of cadets of the Philippine Military Academy, the Philippine Air Force Flying School, and the Philippine National Police Academy and prescribing the manner of subsequent adjustment thereto	March 22, 1985
1016	Withdrawing the inspection, commodity and export clearance requirements on Philippine exports	March 25, 1985
1017	Increasing the combat pay of officers and enlisted personnel of the Armed Forces of the Philippines and the hazardous duty pay of the uniformed members of the Integrated National Police	March 22, 1985
1018	Adding a new specific tax bracket	April 11, 1985
1019	Reorganizing the tax collection and assessment machinery in the provinces, municipalities and cities, and other purposes	April 18, 1985
1020	Creating the Presidential Council for Industrial Peace	May 1, 1985
1021	On encouraging the inward remittances of contract workers earnings through official channels	May 1, 1985
1022	On strengthening the administrative and operational capabilities of the overseas employment program	May 1, 1985
1023	On land use scheme for sugarcane workers	May 1, 1985
1024		May 9, 1985
1025	Providing for the postponement of the 1985 mandatory registration of AFP reservists as provided for by Presidential Decree 183, as amended by Presidential Decree 887	May 10, 1985
1026	Amending Section 78 of the National Internal Revenue Code of 1977, to require dissolving corporations to file information returns and secure tax clearance from the Commissioner of Internal Revenue and providing adequate penalties for violation thereof	May 14, 1985
1027	Amending Executive Order No. 1012	May 14, 1985
1028	Providing for further deregulation in the production and trading of food grains and related agricultural inputs	May 31, 1985
1029	Amending Executive Order No. 852 dated December 3, 1982 entitled "Providing for more effective coordination between national development and security operations"	June 1, 1985
1030	Amending Section 1 of Executive Order No. 898, reorganizing the Committee of Transportation Cooperatives and broadening its powers and functions	June 11, 1985
1031	Reorganizing the PHIVIDEC Industrial Authority	June 11, 1985
1032	Creating a committee to take charge of the planning and execution of the commemorative activities for the 1985 Vicente Orestes Romualdez Centennial Anniversary	June 11, 1985
1033	Declaring the policy of the Philippine Government providing the specific measures to enhance or strengthen the efforts to implement the recovery program and removing the obstacles thereto	June 25, 1985
1034		June 25, 1985
1035	Providing the procedures and guidelines for the expeditious acquisition by the Government of private real properties or rights thereon for infrastructure and other Government development projects	June 25, 1985
1036	Institutionalizing the new organizational structure of the Metropolitan Waterworks and Sewerage System	June 27, 1985
1037	Creating the Philippine Retirement Park System, providing funds therefor and for other purposes	July 4, 1985
1038	Modifying the rates of duty on imported rayon articles as provided under Presidential Decree No. 1464, as amended, otherwise known as the Tariff and Customs Code of 1978	July 9, 1985
1039	Creating the Wood Industry Development Authority, defining its powers and functions, providing funds therefor, and for other purposes	July 10, 1985
1040	Transferring the National Police Commission to the Office of the President	July 10, 1985
1041	Amending Executive Order No. 1004 on the participation of the military and local government units in the implementation of the national infrastructure program	July 23, 1985
1042	Providing for an Internal Revenue Service Career System in the Bureau of Internal Revenue and for other purposes	July 30, 1985
1043	Establishing an Internal Revenue Labels Trust Fund and for other purposes	July 30, 1985
1044	Strengthening the control and supervision over log exports and establishing an effective monitoring system	August 7, 1985
1045	Modifying fiscal incentives to BOI-registered enterprises	August 7, 1985
1046	Providing for the accelerated development of the footwear, leather and leathergoods manufacturing industries and creating the Footwear and Leathergoods Development Board	August 7, 1985
1047	Encouraging distant water fisheries by the Philippine commercial fishing fleet	August 7, 1985
1048	Rehabilitation program to facilitate the reintegration to society of dissidents who return to the folds of the law to include their mass supporters and providing for a Presidential Committee for the implementation thereof	August 8, 1985
1049	Increasing the subsistence allowance of AFP and INP personnel undergoing training in local training institutions	August 8, 1985
1050	Increasing the quarters allowance of the uniformed members of the Integrated National Police	August 8, 1985
1051	Abolition of the Experimental Cinema of the Philippines	August 8, 1985
1052	Authorizing abutting landowners to plant fruit-bearing trees on right-of-way along national, provincial and municipal/city roads integrated into the national and "national-aid" road systems	August 26, 1985
1053	Suspending the implementation of Executive Order No. 1046, entitled "Providing for the accelerated development of the footwear, leather and leathergoods manufacturing industries and creating the Footwear and Leather Goods Development Board"	September 5, 1985
1054	Accelerating the alcohol program and amending Executive Order No. 580 which created the Alcohol Commission	September 18, 1985
1055	Reorganizing the membership in the Governing Board of the Philippine Coconut Authority, and for other purposes	October 3, 1985
1056	Modifying the rates of additional export duty on certain exported articles as provided for in Executive Order No. 920-A, series of 1983 with respect to coconut products	October 4, 1985
1057	Prescribing the manner of implementing the coconut productivity program prescribed by PD 1972	October 7, 1985
1058	Increasing the membership of the Board of Trustees of the Cultural Center of the Philippines	October 10, 1985
1059	Further implementing Presidential Decree No. 1726 in the Ministry of Justice, Ministry of Agrarian Reform and Ministry of Labor and Employment and all other ministries of the National Government	October 22, 1985
1060	Granting salary increases to allied medical positions in the National Government	October 22, 1985
1061	Establishing the Philippine Rice Research Institute (PRRI)	November 5, 1985
1062	Repealing Executive Order No. 955, as amended by Executive Order No. 988, additional import duty on important articles	November 7, 1955
1062-A	Modifying the rates of import duty on certain imported articles as provided under Presidential Decree No. 1464, otherwise known as the Tariff and Customs Code, as amended	December 9, 1985
1063	Further amending Section 5-A of Republic Act Numbered Sixty-Two Hundred Thirty Four entitled "An Act creating the metropolitan waterworks and sewage system and for other purposes	November 12, 1985
1064	Implementing the Coconut Productivity Program	November 13, 1985
1065	Declaring the Bureau of Posts as a critical service agency of the Government and restructuring the salaries of postal officials and workers	November 14, 1985
1066	Reorganizing the Farm Systems Development Corporation	November 22, 1985
1067	Authorizing corporate changes in capital distribution and compensation structure of the Philippine International Trading Corporation created under Presidential Decree No. 1071, as amended	November 25, 1985
1068	Authorizing the Ministry of Local Government to establish and operate a barangay educational and entertainment system	November 25, 1985
1069	Appointing the Minister of Trade and Industry as Vice Chairman of the Philippine Sugar Commission, and creating the position of Deputy Chief Operating Officer	November 25, 1985
1070	Granting year-end bonus to National Government officials and employees equivalent to one month basic pay	November 26, 1985
1071	Authorizing the Commission on Elections to pay overtime compensation to its employees and to fix the rates therefor	November 29, 1985
1072	Establishing the Legislative Service Career System in the Batasang Pambansa, and for other purposes	December 4, 1985
1073	Prescribing safeguards for domestic industries upon the lifting of import licensing for certain products	December 16, 1985
1074	Approving the project of the Coconut Oil Refiners Association (Association) for the development of approximately 60,000 hectares of oil palm plantations in Agusan del Sur and thereby granting incentives to the participants of the project	December 20, 1985
1075	Further amending Executive Order No. 827 dated September 1, 1982	December 26, 1985
1076	Imposing specific tax on certain petroleum products in addition to the ad valorem tax imposed thereon	December 26, 1985

== 1986 ==
No.	Title	Date signed
1077	Revising the computation of creditable vacation and sick leaves of Government officers and employees	January 9, 1986
1078	Providing for the reorganization of the Development Bank of the Philippines, the transfer and divestment of its non-performing accounts, and for other purposes	January 20, 1986
1079	Increasing medicare allowances	January 20, 1986
1080	Allocating ₱20 M annually of the Urban Livelihood Financing Program of the Technology Resource Center for the Livelihood Development Program of the National Housing Authority	January 23, 1986
1081	Establishing the Northern Regional Manpower Training Center for the National Capital Region (NCR) of the National Manpower and Youth Council at the Kaunlaran Village of the National Housing Authority and allocating funds for its operationalization	January 23, 1986
1082	Restructuring the pay scheme of civilian positions in the Naval Shipyard, Philippine Navy	January 26, 1986
1083	Condonation of accrued interests on overdue land amortization payments and/or rentals by agrarian reform beneficiaries in all landed estates administered by the Ministry of Agrarian Reform	January 28, 1986
1084	Approving the establishment of a College of Medicine at the Western Mindanao State University, Zamboanga City	January 28, 1986
1085	Authorizing the Growth Corridor Development and Agro-Modernization Program for Region IV (Southern Tagalog), providing for its implementing machinery and for other purposes	January 30, 1986
1086	Fixing the boundaries of the reclaimed area of the vitas in the Tondo foreshore and transferring to the National Housing Authority	January 31, 1986
1087	Granting compensation adjustments for Government officials and employees	January 31, 1986
1088	Providing for uniform and modified rates for pilotage services rendered to foreign and coastwise vessels in all private or public Philippine ports	February 3, 1986
1089	Establishing the Philippine Industrial Crops Research Institute at the University of Southern Mindanao, Kabacan, Cotabato	February 4, 1986
1090	Establishing the Mindanao and Visayas campuses of the Philippine Science High School	February 5, 1986
1091	Creating the National Shelter Coordinating Council to rationalize and strengthen the shelter agencies under the Ministry of Human Settlements	February 6, 1986
1092	Creating the Constitutional Reform Commission	February 20, 1986
1093	Creating the Council of State as the highest policy formulating and advisory body of the Government	February 22, 1986
