= Siklab Atleta =

Olympic foundation based in the Philippines

- Formation: March 3, 2018; 8 years ago
- Founder: Dennis Uy
- Founded at: Manila, Philippines
- Purpose: Sports program funding
- Executive Director: Chito Salud
- Budget: ₱250 million (2018)
- Website: www.siklabatleta.ph

Siklab Atleta Pilipinas Sports Foundation, Inc., simply known as Siklab Atleta (transl. Athlete's Spark) is a foundation based in the Philippines. It was established to help the Philippines win their first ever gold medal in the Olympics.

== History ==
Siklab Atleta is a project of Dennis Uy, owner of Phoenix Petroleum and Presidential Adviser on Sport to President Rodrigo Duterte. It was formally launched at the Century Park Sheraton Hotel in Manila on March 3, 2018. Initially 16 corporate sponsors pledged support for Siklab Atleta and at least 29 athletes were identified by the foundation as beneficiaries. The organization has partnered with the Philippine Sports Commission, the government agency that tackles sporting affairs in the country.

The target of Siklab Atleta of helping the country win its first Olympic gold medal was met when weightlifter Hidilyn Diaz did so at the 2020 Summer Olympics in Tokyo. The foundation committed an incentive of ₱5 million and a lifetime supply of free fuel from Phoenix Petroleum for Diaz for her feat.

== Goals ==
As of the end of the 2016 Summer Olympics in Rio de Janeiro, Brazil, the Philippines had not won a single gold medal in the Summer Olympic Games. Siklab Atleta has backed the Philippine Sports Commission financially to help the country win its first Olympic gold at the 2020 Summer Olympics in Tokyo, Japan at earliest. Siklab Atleta plans to fund the government's sports program for two Olympic cycles or at least up to the 2024 Summer Olympics. For at least the first Olympic cycle, the foundation plans to raise ₱1 billion and has allocated an annual budget of ₱250 million for its goals.

== Beneficiaries ==
Siklab Atleta focuses on sponsoring athletes which competes in under-funded individual sports rather than team sports or well-funded individual sports such as boxing. Funding is not fixed and the organization will give or withdraw sponsorship depending on the athletes' performance.

Among the athletes backed by Siklab Atleta are:

- Nicole Tagle (Archery)
- James Dieparine (Aquatics)
- Nicole Oliva (Aquatics)
- Trenten Beram (Athletics)
- Eric Cray (Athletics)
- EJ Obiena (Athletics)
- Eumir Marcial (Boxing)
- John Marvin (Boxing)
- OJ Fuentes (Canoe-kayak)
- Hermie Macaranas (Canoe-kayak)
- Ariana Dormitorio (Cycling)
- Sienna Fines (Cycling)
- Marella Salamat (Cycling)
- Kaitlin De Guzman (Gymnastics)
- Carlos Yulo (Gymnastics)
- Kesei Nakano (Judo)
- Shugen Nakano (Judo)
- Mariya Takahashi (Judo)
- Kiyomi Watanabe (Judo)
- James delos Santos (Karate)
- Edito Alcala (Surfing)
- Philmar Alipayo (Surfing)
- Kirstie Alora (Taekwondo)
- Pauline Lopez (Taekwondo)
- Kim Mangrobang (Triathlon)
- Hidilyn Diaz (Weightlifting)
- Kristel Macrohon (Weightlifting)
- Geylord Coveta (Windsurfing)
- Yancy Kaibigan (Windsurfing)

Siklab Atleta has also give cash incentives to athletes who won medals while competing for the Philippines at the 2018 Asian Games.

== See also ==
- Go For Gold (sports program)
- Project Gintong Alay
- Philippine Olympic Committee
