= Go For Gold Philippines =

Sport sponsorship program

- Formation: 2016; 10 years ago
- Founder: Jeremy Go
- Purpose: Sports program funding and sports team organization
- Parent organization: Powerball Marketing and Logistics Corp.

Go For Gold Philippines is a sports foundation and sponsorship program of the Powerball Marketing and Logistics Corp., supporting Filipino athletes and teams competing in various sports. It organizes the Go for Gold Philippines UCI Continental road cycling team.

Go For Gold Philippines began with cycling. In 2016, the Powerball Marketing and Logistics Corporation, led by executive Jeremy Randell Go, decided to form a cycling team under the Go For Gold name. Since then, Go For Gold has branched out to support other sports, such as triathlon, sepak takraw, dragon boat racing, and skateboarding.

In 2019, FIBA made a promotional partnership agreement with Go For Gold to promote the 2019 FIBA Basketball World Cup, which was hosted in China, and in the Philippines.

== Teams ==
Team	Sport	League/competition	Honors^{1}	Years^{1}	Ref.
Go for Gold Cycling Team	Cycling	UCI Continental Circuits		2017–	
Go For Gold Scratchers – College of Saint Benilde Blazers	Basketball	PBA D-League	(gold) 2018 Foundation Cup	2018–2019	
Go for Gold Air Force Aguilas	Volleyball	Spikers' Turf	(silver) 2019 Open		
Go for Gold Air Force Aguilas	Volleyball	PNVF Champions League		2021–	
Mighty Sports–Go for Gold	Basketball	William Jones Cup	(gold) 2019	2019	
San Juan Knights Go For Gold	Basketball	Maharlika Pilipinas Basketball League	(gold) 2018 Datu Cup	2018–	
Philippine Navy–Go For Gold	Basketball (3x3)	Women's PBA 3x3		2024–	

Notes

1. Covers the period when the team is sponsored by Go for Gold, if the team was not formed by Go For Gold itself.

== See also ==
- Gintong Alay
- Siklab Atleta
