= Gintong Alay =

National sports program of the Philippine government

Gintong Alay (PGA)
- Type of project: Sports program
- Country: Philippines
- Launched: October 31, 1979; 1987 (revival)
- Closed: 1986; 1990 (became the PSC)
- Status: Closed

Project Gintong Alay or Gintong Alay (lit. 'Golden Harvest') was a national sports program of the Philippine government launched under the administration of President Ferdinand Marcos.

== History ==
=== Establishment ===
In Letter of Instructions No. 955 dated October 31, 1979, primarily issued to the Ministry of Youth and Sports Development and the Philippine Olympic Committee, President Ferdinand Marcos instructed the creation of a national sports program to develop track and field athletes.

On November 8, 1979, Marcos issued Proclamation No. 1922 which authorized Gintong Alay to conduct an educational and fund campaign to aid in the generation of funds for the project and on May 2, 1980, to expand the scope of the project to include 17 other sports. On August 16, 1980, all donations, bequests and gifts to the sports program were exempted from tax.

=== 1986 disbandment ===
Following the ouster of President Marcos due to the People Power Revolution in February 1986, the Gintong Alay program was effectively ended.

=== Revival and later succession by the PSC ===
In 1987, the program was revived albeit in a smaller scale to prepare and train the Philippine delegate which participated at the 1987 Southeast Asian Games. Gintong Alay would be later replaced with the Philippine Sports Commission (PSC) which was established in 1990.

== Leadership ==
The Gintong Alay Project was led by the Executive Director, the first executive director was Michael Marcos Keon from the project's establishment until the first halt of the project following the People Power Revolution. Keon was also simultaneously the president of the Philippine Olympic Committee.

Joey Romasanta led Gintong Alay, after its revival in 1987. Arturo "Bong" Iligan later served as executive director.

== Legacy ==
Gintong Alay set up a strong foundation in Philippine sports. According to former Executive Director, Michael Marcos Keon, the succeeding officials after him were able to continue the momentum made by the Gintong Alay project citing the overall performance of the Philippines at the 1991 Southeast Asian Games where the country won 91 gold medal-only one medal short from becoming the overall champions. However Keon, said from 1991, Philippine sports went downhill despite continued breaking of national records in measurable sports by Filipino athletes and said that other Southeast Asian and Asian countries are improving in sports more rapidly. He cited the palakasan system, bata-bata (favouritism), and politicking as hindrance to development in Philippine sports.

The initiative led to the Philippines in winning in international competitions especially in track and field in the 1980s. During the program's tenure, Keon discovered Lydia de Vega, eventually she became the "Asia's Sprint Queen" and Isidro del Prado, a two-time Olympian in track and field. Bong Coo became a world champion in Tenpin bowling when she won gold medals in the World Championships in 1979 and 1983.

Under Ferdinand Marcos, the Philippines was always within the top three at the overall standing of the Southeast Asian Games (2nd in 1983, 3rd in 1985 and 1987)However the country's performance went plummeted the next editions finishing 5th ahead only of Myanmar, Vietnam, Laos, and Brunei, which were considered minnows during that time and only receiving two brief success in 2005 when the country managed to become overall champions of the regional tournament and finishing 2nd in 1991; both success were from editions hosted by the nation.

== See also ==
- Go For Gold (sports program)
- Siklab Atleta
- Philippines at the Southeast Asian Games
