= 2025 PSA Annual Awards =

Annual athletic award

- Date: January 27, 2025
- Location: Manila Hotel, Manila
- Country: Philippines
- Hosted by: Quinito Henson; Denise Tan; Bea Escudero

Television/radio coverage
- Network: Cignal TV; Pilipinas Live; Radyo Pilipinas 2 Sports

The 2025 San Miguel Corporation (SMC)-Philippine Sportswriters Association (PSA) Annual Awards was an annual awarding ceremony recognizing the individuals (athletes, officials), teams, National Sports Associations and organizations that achieved success and brought pride and honor to the Philippine sports in the year 2024, specifically in the recent campaign of the Filipino athletes in the 2024 Paris Olympics led by gold medalist Carlos Yulo.

== Details ==
The awards ceremony was held on January 27, 2025, at the Centennial Hall of the Manila Hotel in Manila.

A total of 117 athletes from the past Filipino Olympians to present sports achievers, coaches, officials, sports organizations and entities led by 2024's PSA Athlete of the Year Carlos Yulo were being honored and given recognition in the biggest PSA Awards to date with the theme "Golden Year, Golden Centenary" in line with the 100th year anniversary of the Philippines' participation in the Summer Olympics.

Former Senator and two-time Basketball Olympian Freddie Webb was served as the guest speaker on behalf of all the former Olympic athletes.

Philippine Sports Commission Chairman Richard Bachmann, Philippine Olympic Committee President Abraham Tolentino, Philippine Paralympic Committee President Michael Barredo, 1-Pacman Representative Mikee Romero and Senator Bong Go are among those who were attended the awarding ceremony.

The PSA, currently headed by its president, Nelson Beltran, sports editor of The Philippine Star, is the oldest Philippine-based media group established in 1948 and the membership is composed of sportswriters, sports reporters, sports editors, and columnists from the Philippines-based print media (broadsheets and tabloids), online sports news websites, broadcast (TV and radio) and social media.

== Honor roll ==
=== Main awards ===
The following are the list of main awards of the event.

==== Athlete of the Year ====
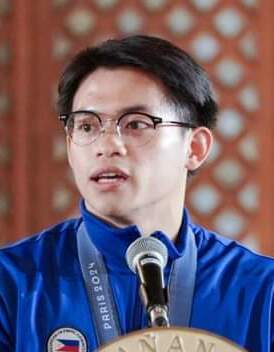
Carlos Yulo named as the Athlete of the Year of the PSA for 2024.

The Philippine Sportswriters Association named Carlos Yulo as the unanimous choice for the Athlete of the Year of 2024 on its annual awards night, citing his recent two gold medal feat in the 2024 Paris Olympics, making him as the first Filipino athlete to win multiple gold medals in the 100-year participation of Team Philippines in the Olympics. He also brought home 4 gold medals in the 2024 Asian Men's Artistic Gymnastics Championships in Uzbekistan.

Yulo is the second gymnast to receive the prestigious Athlete of the Year honors after former SEA Games gymnastics medalist Pia Adelle Reyes, who won the coveted Athlete of the Year by the PSA in 1997.

Award	Winner	Sport	References
Athlete of the Year	Carlos Yulo	Gymnastics (Artistic)	
Milo Philippines Gold, Grit and Glory Award	Carlos Yulo	Gymnastics (Artistic)	

==== Main awardees ====
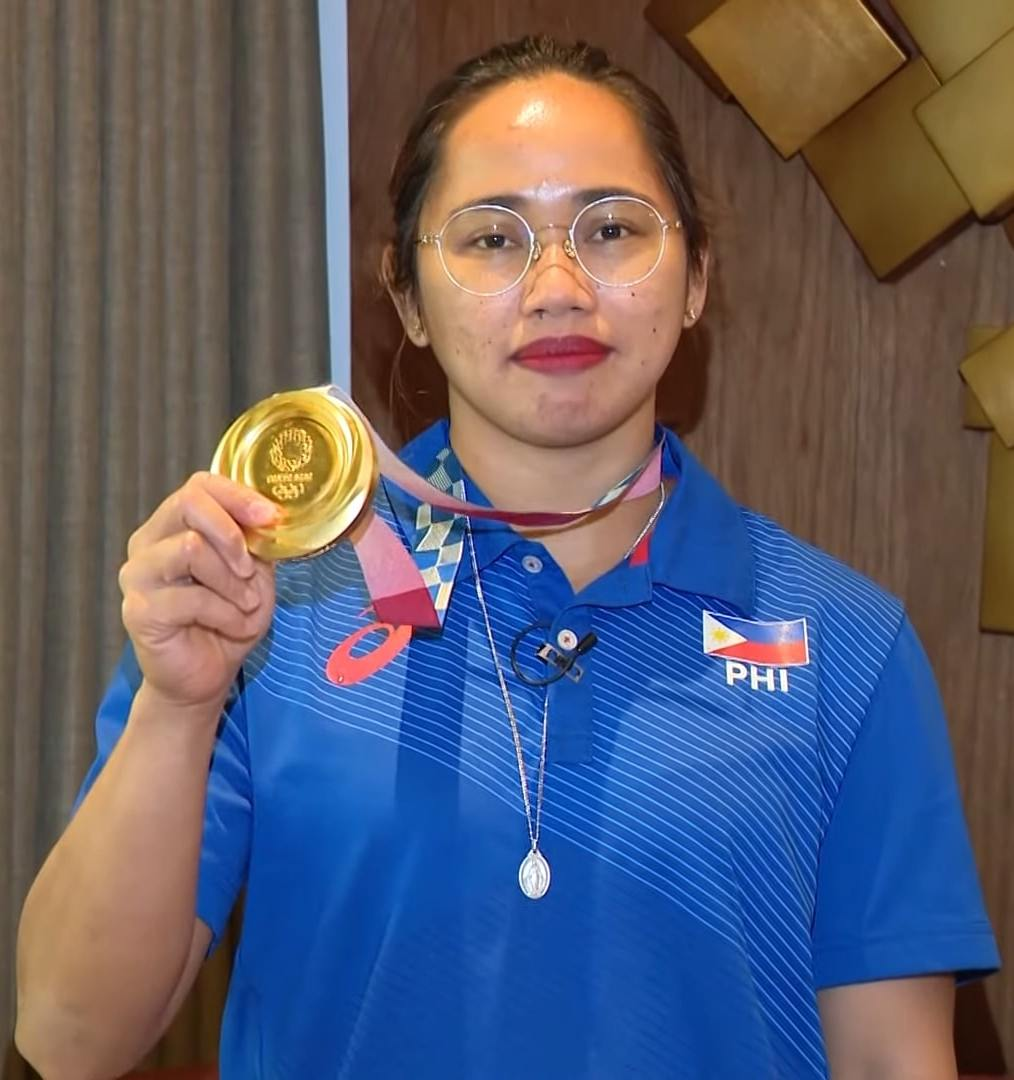
Hidilyn Diaz is the latest recipient of the Hall of Fame Award by the PSA.

Award	Winner	Sport/Team/Recognition	References
President's Award	Nesthy Petecio and Aira Villegas	Boxing (Bronze Medalists, Women's 57 kg and Women's 50 kg, 2024 Summer Olympics)	
Hall of Fame Award	Hidilyn Diaz	Weightlifting (Gold Medalist, Women's 55 kg, 2020 Summer Olympics, 4-Time PSA Athlete of the Year - 2016, 2018, 2021, 2022)	
National Sports Association of the Year	Gymnastics Association of the Philippines (GAP); President: Cynthia Carrion	Gymnastics (Responsible for winning two gold medals in the 2024 Summer Olympics through Carlos Yulo)	
Executive of the Year	Abraham Tolentino; President, Philippine Olympic Committee	Philippine sports (Responsible for bagging the 2 gold and 2 bronze medal performance of Team Philippines in the 2024 Summer Olympics)	
Mr. Basketball	Junemar Fajardo	Professional basketball (Center, Gilas Pilipinas/San Miguel Beermen / 8-time Philippine Basketball Association Most Valuable Player)	
Mr. Basketball	Kevin Quiambao	Amateur basketball (Forward, DLSU Green Archers/Goyang Sono Skygunners / 2-time UAAP Men's Basketball Most Valuable Player)	
Ms. Volleyball	Jia de Guzman	Volleyball (Setter, Alas Pilipinas/Denso Airybees / Best Setter, 2024 AVC Women's Challenge Cup/2024 SEA Women's V.League – First Leg)	
Special Awards	MVP Group of Manny V. Pangilinan	Philippine sports (Spearheading private sector's support towards Philippine athletes, sports teams and associations)	
Special Awards	National Collegiate Athletic Association (NCAA)	Collegiate sports (Recognized for its historic 100th centennial season)	

==== Major awardees ====
Sorted by alphabetical order and based by surname.

Winner	Sport/Team/Recognition	References
Benhur Abalos	Horse racing (Horse Owner of the Year) (Owner and Breeder of 2024 Presidential Gold Cup Champion Batang Manda)	
Rubilen Amit	Billiards (Champion, WPA Women's World 9-Ball Championship)	
Batang Manda; Owner and Breeder: Benhur Abalos; Trainer: Claudio Angeles; Jockey: Patty Dilema; Sire/Dam: Ultimate Goal / Posse Left	Horse racing (Horse of the Year) (Champion, 2024 Philippine Charity Sweepstakes Office (PCSO) - Philippine Racing Commission (PHILRACOM) Presidential Gold Cup)	
Carlo Biado	Billiards (Champion, WPA Predator World 10-Ball Championship)	
John Alvin Guce	Horse racing (Jockey of the Year) (Jockey with the most number of wins for the year 2024)	
Melvin Jerusalem	Boxing (World Boxing Council (WBC) Mini-Flyweight Titleholder)	
Rianne Malixi	Golf (Champion, 2024 Women's Australian Master of the Amateurs, 2024 US Girls' Junior Championships and 2024 US Women's Amateur Championships)	
Tachiana Mangin	Taekwondo (Gold Medalist, Women's -49 kg, 2024 World Junior Taekwondo Championships)	
GM Daniel Quizon	Chess (Awarded as the 17th Filipino Chess Grandmaster by the International Chess Federation (FIDE))	
Pedro Taduran	Boxing (International Boxing Federation (IBF) Minimumweight Titleholder)	

=== Recognition for Olympians and Paralympians ===
The PSA, will also handout recognition and special tribute for all the Olympic athletes and Paralympic athletes who were participated in the recent 2024 Paris Olympics and 2024 Paris Paralympics as well as the other living members of the Philippine Olympic Teams from 1964 Tokyo Olympics until the 2020 Rio Olympics in coordination with the Philippine Olympians Association.

==== 2024 Paris Olympics ====
Athlete	Sport
Elreen Ando	Weightlifting
Dottie Ardina	Golf
Hergie Bacyadan	Boxing
John Cabang Tolentino	Athletics
Samantha Catantan	Fencing
John Ceniza	Weightlifting
Joanie Delgaco	Rowing
Aleah Finnegan	Gymnastics
Jarod Hatch	Swimming
Lauren Hoffman	Athletics
Emma Malabuyo	Gymnastics
Eumir Marcial	Boxing
EJ Obiena	Athletics
Carlo Paalam	Boxing
Bianca Pagdanganan	Golf
Nesthy Petecio	Boxing
Levi Ruivivar	Gymnastics
Kayla Sanchez	Swimming
Vanessa Sarno	Weightlifting
Aira Villegas	Boxing
Kiyomi Watanabe	Judo
Carlos Yulo	Gymnastics

==== 2024 Paris Paralympics ====
Athlete	Sport
Cendy Asusano	Athletics
Agustina Bantiloc	Archery
Allain Ganapin	Taekwondo
Ernie Gawilan	Swimming
Jerrold Mangliwan	Athletics
Angel Otom	Swimming

==== Former Olympians ====
Edition	Athlete	Sport
1964 Tokyo	Mildred Canete	Athletics
1968 Mexico	Ernesto Beren	Gymnastics
1968 Mexico	Jimmy Mariano	Basketball
1972 Munich	Ricardo Fortaleza	Boxing
1972 Munich	Ral Rosario	Swimming
1972 Munich	Marte Samson	Basketball
1972 Munich	Freddie Webb	Basketball
1976 Montreal	Reynaldo Fortaleza	Boxing
1984 Los Angeles	Christine Jacob-Sandejas	Swimming
1988 Seoul	Gregorio Colonia	Weightlifting
1988 Seoul	Monsour del Rosario	Taekwondo
1988 Seoul	Stephen Fernandez	Taekwondo
1988 Seoul	Ed Maerina	Rowing
1988 Seoul	Benjamin McMurray	Judo
1988 Seoul	Akiko Thomson-Guevara	Swimming
1992 Barcelona	Ed Lasquete	Athletics
1992 Barcelona	Bea Lucero	Taekwondo
1992 Barcelona	Jaime Recio	Shooting
1992 Barcelona	Juan Miguel Torres	Sailing
1992 Barcelona	Walter Torres	Fencing
1992 Barcelona	Roel Velasco	Boxing
1992 Barcelona	Isidro Vicera	Boxing
1996 Atlanta	Weena Lim	Badminton
1996 Atlanta	Elias Recaido	Boxing
1996 Atlanta	Onyok Velasco	Boxing
2000 Sydney	Roberto "Kitoy" Cruz	Taekwondo
2000 Sydney	Donnie Geisler	Taekwondo
2000 Sydney	Jenny Guerrero	Swimming
2000 Sydney	Toni Leviste	Equestrian
2000 Sydney	Jasmin Simpao	Taekwondo
2000 Sydney	Benjie Tolentino	Rowing
2004 Athens	Raphael Matthew Chua	Swimming
2004 Athens	Jethro Dionisio	Shooting
2008 Beijing	Eric Ang	Shooting
2008 Beijing	Hidilyn Diaz	Weightlifting
2008 Beijing	Marestella Torres	Athletics
2012 London	Jasmine Alkhaldi	Swimming
2012 London	Rene Herrera	Athletics
2012 London	Jessie Lacuna	Swimming
2016 Rio	Kirstie Alora	Taekwondo
2016 Rio	Rogen Ladon	Boxing
2016 Rio	Charly Suarez	Boxing
2016 Rio	Mary Joy Tabal	Athletics
2020 Tokyo	Kurt Barbosa	Taekwondo
2020 Tokyo	Cris Nievarez	Rowing

=== Special citations ===
Sorted by alphabetical order and based by surname.

Winner	Sport/Team/Recognition	References
Isabella Butler	Jiu-jitsu (Gold Medalist, Girls U18 -57 kg, JJIF World Youth Championships)	
WFM Ruelle Canino	Chess (Member, Philippine Women's Chess Team; Champion, Category B, 45th World Chess Olympiad)	
Johann Chua	Billiards (Champion, Hanoi Open 9-Ball Championship and Team Asia Member, Reyes Cup)	
Angeline Colonia	Weightlifting (Double Gold and Silver Medalist, Women's -45 kg, IWF Junior Weightlifting Championship)	
Creamline Cool Smashers	Volleyball (Champion, All-Filipino, Reinforced and Invitational Conferences, Premier Volleyball League 2024 season)	
Kheith Rhynne Cruz	Table tennis (Champion, Girls Under-18 Singles, WTT Youth Contender Westchester; Multiple Medalist, US Table Tennis Open Championships)	
Marc Custodio	Bowling (Champion, Open Division, 10th DIBC-Delta Open Bowling Tournament)	
Mark Galedo	Cycling (Champion, Men's Elite Long 105 km, 2024 Tour of Guam)	
Lovely Inan	Weightlifting (Double Gold and Silver Medalist, Women's -49 kg, IWF Junior Weightlifting Championship)	
Albert James Manas	Billiards (Champion, 99 Billiards Club Hanoi Tournament)	
Philippine Men's Baseball Team	Baseball (Champion, 2024 East Asia Baseball Cup)	
Philippine Dragon Boat Team (PCKDF)	Dragon boat (Overall Champion, 2024 ICF Dragon Boat World Championships)	
Philippine Volcanoes	Rugby sevens (Champion, Men's and Women's, Asia Rugby Emirates Sevens Trophy)	
Pilipinas Live (Cignal)	Sports broadcasting (Recognized for its world-class livestream and contents of the biggest sports events in the Philippines and the world)	
Regie Ramirez	Powerlifting (Deadlift Gold Medalist and Deadlift World Record Holder, Men's 59 kg, 2024 World Open Equipped Powerlifting Championships)	
Ramon Suzara	Volleyball (Executive Vice President, Fédération Internationale de Volleyball and President, Asian Volleyball Confederation and Philippine National Volleyball Federation)	
Jessa Mae Tabuan	Powerlifting (Triple Gold and Silver Medalist and New Philippine Junior Record Holder, Women's 52 kg, 2024 IPF World Classic and Equipped Sub-Junior, Junior Powerlifting Championship)	
Eldrew Yulo	Gymnastics (Gold, Vault, Men’s Artistic Gymnastics Asian Championships; Multiple Medalist, Pacific Rim Gymnastics Championships)	

=== Tony Siddayao Awards and Milo Junior Athletes of the Year ===
The award, which is named after Tony Siddayao (deceased, former sports editor of the Manila Standard) and sponsored by Milo Philippines is given out to outstanding junior national athletes aged 18 and below.

Winner	Sport/Team/Recognition	References
Aielle Aguilar	Jiu-Jitsu (Champion, Girls Gi Kids 2 Prey 22 kgs A, 2024 Abu Dhabi World Jiu-Jitsu Festival Championships)	
James Ajido	Swimming (Gold Medalist, Boys 12-14 100m Butterfly, 11th Asian Age Group Swimming Championships and Gold Medalist, Boys 14-16 50m Butterfly, 46th Southeast Asian Age Group Championships)	
Miriam Grace Balisme	Wrestling (Gold Medalist, Women's Freestyle 61 kg, Southeast Asian Wrestling Championships and Oceania Invitational)	
Paul Sondrei Capinig	Wrestling (Gold Medalist, Men's Freestyle 51 kg, Southeast Asian Wrestling Championships and Oceania Invitational)	
Sophia Catantan	Fencing (Gold Medalist, Girls Junior Foil Individual, 5th Southeast Asia Pacific Fencing Championship)	
Alexander Delos Reyes	Wushu (Gold Medalist, Boys Taijijian, 9th World Junior Wushu Championships)	
Behrouz Mojdeh	Swimming (Gold Medalist, Boys 200m Backstroke, Asian Open School Invitational Long Course Swimming Championships)	

=== Posthumous Honors for Deceased Sports Personalities ===
During the awards program, the organization will offer a special tribute and remembrance to the sports personalities who died in 2024 and January 2025 through a one minute of silent prayer.

- Rene Alforque (Basketball)
- Alice Andrada (Golf)
- Carlos Brosas (Swimming)
- Edgardo Cantada (Volleyball)
- Felix Casas (Golf)
- Boy Clarino (Basketball)
- Benjie Cleofas (Basketball)
- Ricky Dandan (Basketball)
- Edwin Gastanes (Football)
- Sven-Göran Eriksson (Football)
- Mervin Guarte (Obstacle Sports)
- Ays Hufanda (Basketball)
- Janisa Johnson (Volleyball)
- Tony Lu (Sports Photography)
- Clyde Mariano (Sportswriting)
- Yoyoy Martirez (Basketball)
- Remy Monteverde (Basketball)
- Rey Pages (Basketball)
- Alex Prieto (Golf)
- Eugene Quilban (Basketball)
- Janrick Soriano (Football)
- Chino Trinidad (Sportscasting)
- Arnold Villanueva (Basketball)
- Elmer Yanga (Basketball)

== See also ==
- 2024 in Philippine sports
- 4th Siklab Youth Sports Awards
- 2025 PSC Women in Sports Awards
- 2nd Pacquiao–Elorde Awards
