= 2024 in Philippine sports =

The following is a list of notable events and developments related to Philippine sports in 2024.

== Events ==
=== Athletics ===
- February 20 – Ernest John Obiena wins the gold medal at the Memorial Josip Gasparac indoor pole vault event in Croatia, clearing the 5.83-meter mark.
- February 23 – Ernest John Obiena wins the gold medal at the ISTAF Berlin in Germany after clearing the 5.93-meter mark, setting a new Asian record.
- April 18 – Leonard Gorospe wins a bronze medal in the men's high jump event at the 2024 Singapore Open Track and Field Championships in Singapore, clearing the 2.14-meter mark.
- April 19 – Janry Ubas wins a gold medal in the men's long jump event at the 2024 Singapore Open Track and Field Championships in Singapore with a jump of 7.58 meters.
- May 5 – The Philippine delegation wins three gold, one silver, and one bronze medals at the 2024 Hong Kong Athletics Championships in Hong Kong.
- May 8–12 – The Philippine Athletics Championships is held at the PhilSports Track Oval in Pasig.
- May 18 – Ernest John Obiena wins the gold medal at the USA Track and Field Los Angeles Grand Prix in Los Angeles, California, United States after clearing the 5.8-meter mark.
- May 30 – Ernest John Obiena wins the silver medal at the Bislett Games in Oslo, Norway, clearing the 5.72-meter mark.
- June 20 – Ernest John Obiena wins the gold medal at the Irena Szewińska Memorial in Bydgoszcz, Poland, clearing the 5.97-meter mark.
- June 23 – Ernest John Obiena wins two gold medals at the Memorial Czeslawa Cybulskiego in Poznań, Poland, clearing the 5.87-meter mark.
- August 22 – Ernest John Obiena wins a bronze medal at the Lausanne Diamond League in Lausanne, Switzerland, clearing the 5.82-meter mark.

=== Badminton ===
- June 11 – The final tournament of the 2024 Philippine Badminton Open is held at Gameville Ball Park in Mandaluyong.
  - Jewel Angelo Albo wins the men's singles tournament final after defeating Clarence Villaflor in two sets 21–13, 21–9.
  - Mika de Guzman wins the women's singles tournament final after defeating Ysabel Amora in three sets 21–11, 14–21, 21–8.
  - Ariel Magnaye and Christian Bernardo win the men's doubles tournament final after defeating Solomon Padiz Jr. and Julius Villabrille in three sets 22–20, 15–21, 20–17.
  - Lea Inlayo and Nicole Albo win the women's doubles tournament final after defeating Kimberly Lao and Patricia De Dios in two sets 21–12, 21–7.
  - Christian Bernardo and Alyssa Leonardo win the mixed doubles tournament final after defeating Julius Villabrille and Nicole Albo in three sets 21–19, 19–21, 21–14.

=== Baseball ===
- April 22 – The NU Bulldogs win the UAAP baseball championships during UAAP Season 86 after defeating the De La Salle Green Archers 4–2 at the UP Baseball Field in Quezon City.
- November 3 – The Philippines wins the East Asia Baseball Cup for the fifth consecutive time after defeating Hong Kong 9–2 in Pampanga.

=== Basketball ===
- January 29 – Strong Group Athletics finishes runner-up at the 2023 Dubai International Basketball Championships after losing to Al Riyadi Club Beirut 74–77 in the final.
- February 14 – The San Miguel Beermen win the 2023–24 PBA Commissioner's Cup after defeating the Magnolia Hotshots 4–2 in a best-of-seven game series.
- March 8–10 – The final round of the 2023–24 East Asia Super League is held at Hoops Dome in Lapu-Lapu City, Cebu. The tournament concludes with Chiba Jets winning 72–69 against Seoul SK Knights.
- March 27–31 – The Philippines men's and women's national teams compete at the men's and women's tournaments of the FIBA 3x3 Asia Cup in Singapore. The men's team is knocked out of contention after losing 21–13 to Australia and 22–12 to Japan during the group stage on March 30, while the women's team finishes in the quarterfinal stage after losing 19–9 to Chinese Taipei on March 31.
- April 16 – The Quezon Titans win the 2023–24 Pilipinas Super League President's Cup after defeating the Nueva Ecija Capitals 3–1 in a best-of-five game series.
- June 12 – The UP Fighting Maroons win the 2024 Filoil EcoOil Preseason Cup after defeating the De La Salle Green Archers 69–66 in the final.
- June 16 - The Meralco Bolts become the 2024 PBA Philippine Cup champions after defeating the San Miguel Beermen 4–2 in a best-of-seven game series. This is the team’s first title in the history of the Philippine Basketball Association since they joined the said league in 2010.
- June 30 – The Philippine national under-18 team wins the 2024 FIBA Under-18 Women's Asia Cup–Division B in Shenzhen, China, after defeating Lebanon 95–64. The team is promoted to Division A for the next tournament.
- June 30 – July 8 – The Philippine national under-17 team finishes at sixteenth place at the 2024 FIBA Under-17 Basketball World Cup in Turkey, after losing 115–53 to Australia.
- July 3–8 – The Philippine national basketball team finishes in the semifinal round at the 2024 FIBA Men's Olympic Qualifying Tournaments in Riga, Latvia, after losing 71–60 to Brazil.
- July 21 – Strong Group Athletics wins the 2024 William Jones Cup in New Taipei City, Taiwan after defeating Chinese Taipei A 83–79.
- August 13 – The De La Salle Green Archers win the World University Basketball Series after defeating Korea University 101–86 in a gold medal match in Tokyo, Japan.
- August 19–25 – The Philippine national basketball team finishes unplaced at the 2026 FIBA Women's Basketball World Cup Pre-Qualifying Tournaments in Kigali, Rwanda.
- September 2–6 – The Philippines men's national team finishes 11th place at the 2024 FIBA U18 Asia Cup in Amman, Jordan after losing 85–61 to Japan.
- September 20 – Josh Reyes resigns as head coach of the Philippines men's national under-17 basketball team.
- September 26 – NorthPort Batang Pier player John Amores is arrested after shooting at another person following a dispute over a basketball game in Lumban, Laguna the previous day. The incident leads to the Games and Amusements Board revoking his license to play professional basketball on December 22.
- November 8 – TNT Tropang Giga wins the 2024 PBA Governors' Cup after defeating Barangay Ginebra San Miguel 95–85 in the final in the Araneta Coliseum.
- November 12 – American exhibition basketball team Harlem Globetrotters begins the Asian leg of its 2024 world tour at the Araneta Coliseum.
- December 7
  - The Mapúa Cardinals clinched the NCAA Season 100 basketball title after defeating the Benilde Blazers 2–0 in a best-of-three game series held at the Araneta Coliseum in Cubao, Quezon City. This is their sixth basketball championship title in 33 years since they last won in 1991.
  - The Pampanga Giant Lanterns proclaimed as the 2024 MPBL season champions after defeating the Quezon Huskers 3–0 in a best-of-five finals series and also the first team to win back-to-back championships in MPBL history.
- December 15
  - The NU Lady Bulldogs clinched the UAAP Season 87 women's basketball title after defeating the UST Growling Tigresses 2–1 in winner take-all game three of the best-of-three finals series held at the Araneta Coliseum in Cubao, Quezon City. This is their eighth basketball championship title in two years since they last won in 2022.
  - The UP Fighting Maroons clinched the UAAP Season 87 men's basketball title after defeating De La Salle Green Archers 2–1 in winner take-all game three of the best-of-three finals series held at the Araneta Coliseum in Cubao, Quezon City. This is their fourth basketball championship title in four years since they last won in 2022.

=== Bowling ===
- February 18 – Marc Dylan Custodio wins the 10th DIBC-Delta Open Bowling Tournament in Dubai, United Arab Emirates, tallying 1,837 points.
- September 20 – Lara Posadas-Wong wins the silver medal at the 27th Asian Ten-pin Bowling Championship in Bangkok, Thailand after registering 1,353 pin falls in a women's singles event.

=== Boxing ===
- January 26:
  - Froilan Saludar loses his OPBF bantamweight title to Keita Kurihara in their rematch, which also had the vacant IBF Pan Pacific bantamweight title at stake.
  - Christian Araneta defeats compatriot Arvin Magramo in an IBF light flyweight title eliminator via first-round technical knockout.
- January 31:
  - Romero Duno loses to Mexico's Antonio Moran via sixth-round knockout.
  - Mike Plania loses to Angelo Leo via third-round knockout.
- February 3 – The Philippine delegation wins four gold medals at the Boxam Elite Tournament in La Nucia, Spain.
- February 13 – Reymart Gaballo wins against Paipharob Kokietgym via knockout in the first round to retain his WBO Oriental bantamweight title.
- February 18 – The International Olympic Committee rejects Manny Pacquiao's application to compete in the 2024 Paris Olympics, citing age and qualifying competition requirements.
- February 22 – Dave Apolinario wins against Tanes Ongjunta via technical knockout in the fourth round.
- February 24:
  - Jonas Sultan loses to Riku Masuda via knockout in the first round.
  - Jerwin Ancajas loses against Takuma Inoue via technical knockout in the ninth round of the WBA bantamweight championship in Ryōgoku, Tokyo, Japan.
- March 23 – Eumir Marcial defeats Thoedsak Sinam via technical knockout in the fourth round at Ninoy Aquino Stadium in Manila.
- March 24 – The inaugural edition of the Pacquiao-Elorde Awards is held at Okada Manila in Parañaque, with Melvin Jerusalem and Marlon Tapales recognized as Boxers of the Year.
- March 30 – Arthur Villanueva loses against Elijah Pierce via technical knockout in the fourth round in Atlanta, Georgia, United States.
- March 31 – Melvin Jerusalem wins the WBC minimumweight championship after defeating Yudai Shigeoka via split decision in Nagoya, Japan.
- April 13 – Miel Fajardo loses his OPBF light flyweight title to Thailand’s Thanongsak Simsri via unanimous decision.
- April 14 – Charly Suarez wins against Luis Coria via unanimous decision at the American Bank Center in Corpus Christi, Texas, United States.
- April 21 – Jayson Vayson retains the WBO Asia-Pacific light flyweight title after defeating Takeru Inoue via unanimous decision in Osaka, Japan.
- April 29 – Gabriel Elorde is posthumously inducted into the International Boxing Hall of Fame in Canastota, New York, United States.
- April 30 – Regie Suganob retains his WBO Global light flyweight title against Kai Ishizawa of Japan via 8th round TKO in Tagbilaran, Bohol.
- May 5 – The Philippine delegation wins four bronze medals at the 2024 ASBC Asian Under-22 and Youth Boxing Championships in Astana, Kazakhstan.
- May 10:
  - Marlon Tapales wins the WBC Asia Continental super bantamweight title after defeating Nattapong Jankaew of Thailand via knockout in the first round at Midas Hotel and Casino in Pasay.
  - Reymart Gaballo loses against Kenbun Torres via knockout in the first round.
- June 15 – Mark Magsayo wins via lop-sided decision against Mexican Eduardo Ramirez to claim the vacant WBA Inter-Continental super featherweight strap in the historical MGM Grand Garden Arena, Las Vegas, United States.
- July 28:
  - Pedro Taduran defeats Ginjiro Shigeoka of Japan in an IBF minimumweight match via a nine-round stoppage at the Shiga Daihatsu Arena in Otsu, Japan.
  - Manny Pacquiao's three-round exhibition match against Japanese kickboxer Rukiya Anpo ends in a draw in Saitama, Japan.
- August 7 – Aira Villegas wins the bronze medal at the women's flyweight division of the 2024 Summer Olympics in Paris, France after losing to Buse Naz Çakıroğlu of Turkey via unanimous decision.
- August 8 – Nesthy Petecio wins the bronze medal at the women's featherweight division of the 2024 Summer Olympics in Paris, France after losing to Julia Szeremeta of Poland via split decision.
- August 10 – Dave Apolinario loses against Ángel Ayala of Mexico for the vacant IBF flyweight championship via knockout in the sixth round.
- August 24 – Kevin Jake Cataraja loses to Kenbun Torres, marking Torres' second upset.
- September 7 – Marlon Tapales defeats Saurabh Kumar for the WBC Asia bantamweight championship via unanimous decision in Phnom Penh, Cambodia.
- September 21 – Charly Suarez wins the WBO International junior lightweight championship after defeating Jorge Castaneda via knockout in the third round.
- September 22 – Jerwin Ancajas defeats Sukpraserd Ponpitak via disqualification in the fifth round in Mandaluyong.
- October 13 – John Riel Casimero wins the WBO International super bantamweight championship after defeating Saul Sanchez via knockout on the first round in Yokohama, Japan.
- December 5 – Manny Pacquiao is inducted into the International Boxing Hall of Fame for 2025.

=== Canoeing ===
- October 31–November 3 – The Philippines hosts the ICF Dragon Boat World Championships in Puerto Princesa, Palawan, emerging as the tournament's overall champion after winning 11 gold, 20 silver, and 16 bronze medals.

=== Chess ===
- March 31– Daniel Quizon wins the Hanoi Grandmaster Chess Tournament in Vietnam after defeating grandmaster Bui Vinh in the ninth and final round.
- July 9 – Typhoon Yolanda survivor Mario Rebano prevails in the World Open Chess Under 2000 Tournament 2024 in Philadelphia.
- August 25 – International Master Daniel Quizon places sixth at the 30th Abu Dhabi International Chess Festival, winning against four grandmasters out of the six matches, including a victory over S. L. Narayanan of India. His ratings improves from 2457 to 2490, only 10 points away from reaching the grandmaster title.
- September 15 – Daniel Quizon is elevated to grandmaster title at the 2024 FIDE Chess Olympiad at BOK Sports Hall in Budapest, Hungary after defeating Igor Efimov.

=== Cue sports ===
- January 12 – Carlo Biado wins the 2024 Chinese Taipei Open after defeating fellow Filipino Bernie Regalario 13–7 in the grand final.
- January 25 – Jeffrey Ignacio wins the inaugural 2024 Indonesia International 10-Ball Open in Jakarta, Indonesia, defeating Robbie Capito of Hong Kong 10–3 in the grand final.
- February 24 – Lee Vann Corteza and Chezka Centeno win the men's and women's divisions of the Las Vegas Open 10-Ball Championships in Las Vegas, Nevada, United States.
- March 3 – Carlo Biado wins the 2024 World 10-Ball Championship in Las Vegas, Nevada, United States after defeating Naoyuki Ōi of Japan 3–1 in the grand final.
- April 21 – Michael Baoanan wins the 2024 Bali International 10-Ball Open in Bali, Indonesia, defeating Richard Alinsub 11–8 in the grand final.
- May 6 – The Sharks Billiards Association is launched as the first professional pool league in the country, with sports columnist Chino Trinidad as its inaugural commissioner.
- June 30 – Carlo Biado finishes third place at the Maldives Open 2024 10-Ball Championships after being defeated by Alex Kazekis of Greece with a score of 10–7 in the semifinals.
- September 8 – Rubilen Amit wins the 2024 WPA Women's World Nine-ball Championship in Hamilton, New Zealand after defeating Chen Siming of China with a score of 3–1 in the final.
- September 16 – Jeffrey Ignacio wins the 27th Japan Open tournament after defeating Lin Tsung-han of Chinese Taipei 8–3 in the final.
- September 29 – Carlo Biado wins the inaugural Ho Chi Minh City Nine-ball championship after defeating Mario He of Austria 13–8 in the final.
- October 15–18 – The inaugural Efren Reyes Cup is held at Ninoy Aquino Stadium in Manila with Team Asia winning the tournament.
- December 20 – The Taguig Stallions win the inaugural Sharks Billiards Association after defeating the Manila MSW Mavericks 15–8 in the final tournament.

=== Curling ===
- November 2 – The Philippine national team wins the 2024 Pan Continental Curling Championships – Division B after defeating Kazakhstan 9–3 in the final. The team is promoted to Division A for the next tournament.

=== Cycling ===
- January 16 – John Andre Aguja wins the Thailand MTB Cup Juniors in Kanchanaburi, Thailand.
- February 9 – Jonel Carcueva wins the men's elite road race in the 2024 PhilCycling National Championships for Road in Tagaytay with a time of 4 hours, 23 minutes, and 23.40 seconds.
- May 31 – Patrick Coo wins the silver medal in the 2024 Asian Cycling Confederation BMX Championships in Nong Chok, Thailand.

=== Darts ===
- April 20–21 – The PDC Asia Tour is held at Winford Hotel and Casino in Santa Cruz, Manila.

=== Esports ===
- January 13–14 – The Philippines hosts the Asia Pacific Predator League 2024 at the Mall of Asia Arena in Pasay. The tournament concludes with Blacklist Rivalry winning against fellow Filipino finalist Execration 2–0 in Dota 2, and Team Secret winning against Fav Gaming 2–0 in the Valorant grand final.
- February 3 – G1 Blacklist finishes runner-up at the Wild Rift League Asia season two after losing to KeepBest Gami1ng 3–4 in the grand final.
- May 26 – Liquid ECHO wins the 2024 MPL Philippines season after defeating Falcons AP Bren 4–0 in the grand final.
- May 27 – Alexandre "AK" Laverez wins the Tekken 8 Combo Breaker 2024 in Schaumburg, Illinois, United States after defeating Arsalan Ash of Pakistan 4–2 in the grand final.
- July 14 – AP Bren finishes runner-up at the Mobile Legends: Bang Bang Mid-Season Cup in Riyadh, Saudi Arabia after losing to Selangor Red Giants 4–3 in the grand final tournament.
- July 27 – Smart Omega Empress wins the MLBB Women's Invitational in Saudi Arabia after defeating Team Vitality of Indonesia 3–0 in the grand final.
- October 20 – Fnatic ONIC PH wins the MPL Philippines Season 14 after defeating Aurora 4–3 in the grand final.
- December 11–12 – The 2024 eFIBA World Finals is held at the SMX Clark Convention Center in Mabalacat, Pampanga, with eGilas finishing at fourth place.
- December 15 – Fnatic ONIC PH wins the MLBB M6 World Championship in Kuala Lumpur, Malaysia after defeating Team Liquid ID 4–1 in the final tournament.

=== Figure skating ===
- December 22 – President Bongbong Marcos signs into law the naturalization of Russian figure skater Aleksandr Korovin, making him eligible to represent the Philippines in international competitions.

=== Floorball ===
- May 21–25 – The Philippines men's national floorball team wins the 2024 Men's World Floorball Championships Asian Qualifiers after defeating Thailand 6–5 in the tournament held at the PhilSports Arena in Pasig.
- December 8–16 – The Philippine national team finishes ninth place at the 2024 Men's World Floorball Championships in Sweden.

=== Football ===
- February 25–28 – The Philippines women's national football team finishes in fourth place at the 2024 Pinatar Cup in Spain after a 1–0 loss to Slovenia.
- February 26 – The Philippine Football Federation appoints Tom Saintfiet as the new head coach of the Philippines men's national football team. However, he leaves to become head coach of the Mali men's national football team on August 29 and is replaced on September 10 by Albert Capellas.
- March 28 – Negros Occidental-based San Carlos City F.C. wins the Real Madrid Foundation World 12-Under Challenge Championship in Madrid, Spain after defeating USA-Blue 3–1 in the silver group final.
- May 10 – The FEU Lady Tamaraws win the UAAP Season 86 football women's tournament after defeating the De La Salle Lady Archers 2–1 in extra time.
- May 12 – The Philippines women's national under-17 football team finishes at the group stage of the 2024 AFC U-17 Women's Asian Cup in Bali, Indonesia after drawing 1–1 against South Korea.
- May 16 – The UP Fighting Maroons win the UAAP Season 86 football men's tournament after defeating the FEU Tamaraws 1–0 in the final.
- June 20 – Jefferson Cheng steps down as the team manager of the Philippines women's national football team.
- July 13 – The Makati F.C. Boys 13 and Girls 12 teams win their respective divisions in the Helsinki Cup in Finland, while its Girls 14 team finishes in second place.
- July 14 – Kaya F.C.–Iloilo wins the 2024 Philippines Football League season with a record of 13 wins and one draw.
- October 14 – The Philippines men's national football team wins a bronze medal at the 2024 King's Cup in Thailand after defeating Tajikistan 3–0.
- November 16–21 – The Philippines hosts the inaugural ASEAN Women's Futsal Championship in Pasig, with the home team finishing in fifth place after losing to Indonesia 2–1 on November 20.
- December 9 – Stallion Laguna wins the 2024 PFF Women's Cup after defeating Kaya F.C.–Iloilo 1–0 in the final. It is the club's first title.
- December 14 – The FEU Lady Tamaraw Booters win the UAAP Season 87 women's football tournament for the third consecutive time after defeating the De La Salle Lady Booters 3–2 in the final. FEU's Carmela Altiche is named the Finals MVP.
- November 23 – December 30 – The Philippine men's national team reaches the semifinals of the 2024 ASEAN Championship, losing to Thailand 4–3 on aggregate score.
- December 29 – Tahnai Annis resigns as captain of the Philippine women's national team and retires from professional football altogether.

=== Golf ===
- January 26 – Antonio Lascuña wins the TCC Invitational in Laguna after tallying 291 points.
- March 15 – Jhonnel Ababa wins the ICTSI Apo Golf Classic in Davao City.
- March 22 – Lloyd Jefferson Go wins the ICTSI Palos Verdes Championship in Davao City.
- April 12 – Clyde Mondilla wins the ICTSI Caliraya Springs Championship in Laguna.

=== Gymnastics ===
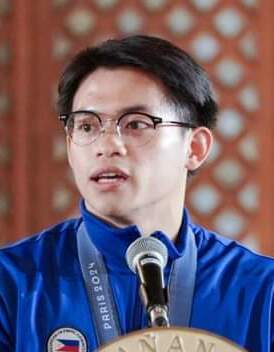
Gymnast Carlos Yulo won the Philippines' Olympic gold medal at the 2024 Summer Olympics in Paris (image taken at the Malacañan Palace in 2024).

- March 9 – Carlos Yulo wins the bronze medal in floor exercise at the 2024 FIG Artistic Gymnastics World Cup series in Baku, Azerbaijan.
- April 20 – Carlos Yulo wins the gold medal in parallel bars and a silver medal in men's vault at the 2024 FIG Artistic Gymnastics Apparatus World Cup series in Doha, Qatar.
- April 21–28 – The Philippine delegation finishes sixth overall at the 2024 Pacific Rim Gymnastics Championships in Cali, Colombia, after winning three gold, three silver, and two bronze medals.
- May 16 – Carlos Yulo wins the gold medal in all-around exercises at the Artistic Gymnastics Asian Championships in Tashkent, Uzbekistan.
- August 3 – Carlos Yulo wins the gold medal in men's floor exercise at the 2024 Summer Olympics in Paris, France, marking the first time the Philippines wins a gold medal in gymnastics since its first participation in 1964.
- August 4 – Carlos Yulo wins the gold medal in men's artistic gymnastics at the 2024 Summer Olympics in Paris, France, marking the second time the Philippines wins a gold medal in gymnastics.

=== Handball ===
- June 18–23 – The Philippine national team finishes in 12th place at the 2024 Women's Beach Handball World Championships in China.
- December 25–28 – The Philippines men's national handball team finishes bronze medal at the 10th Singapore Handball Open Tournament in Singapore.

=== Ice hockey ===
- February 24 – March 1 – The Philippines men's national ice hockey team finishes in fourth place at the 2024 IIHF World Championship Division III-B in Sarajevo, Bosnia and Herzegovina.
- March 23–31 – The Philippines women's national ice hockey team finishes with a silver medal at the 2024 IIHF Women's Asia and Oceania Championship in Bishkek, Kyrgyzstan.

=== Jiu-jitsu ===
- May 12 – The Philippine delegation wins two silver medals at the 2024 Asian Jiu-jitsu Championships in Abu Dhabi, United Arab Emirates.
- June 23 – The Philippine delegation wins three silver and one bronze medal at the 2024 Thailand Grand Prix Open in Bangkok, Thailand.
- October 23 – November 3 – The Philippine delegation wins four gold, two silver, and 14 bronze medals at the 2024 Jiu-Jitsu International Federation World Championships in Heraklion, Greece.

=== Karate ===
- April 24–26 – The Philippine delegation wins six gold, one silver, and sixteen bronze medals at the 2024 Southeast Asian Karate Federation Championship in Bangkok, Thailand.

=== Lawn bowls ===
- March 3–10 – The Philippine delegation finishes second overall at the 2024 Asian Bowls Championship in Thailand after winning four gold, one silver, and three bronze medals.

=== Mixed martial arts ===
- March 1 – Joshua Pacio defeats Jarred Brooks via disqualification for the ONE Strawweight Mixed Martial Arts World Championship rematch at ONE 166 in Qatar.
- August 31 – Junna Tsukii defeats Ruka Sakamoto via submission on her mixed martial arts debut at the DEEP Summer Festival 2024 in Odaiba, Japan.

=== Motorsports ===
- March 23 – A non-participating motorcyclist is killed after her vehicle figures in a collision with another motorcyclist participating in the Bohol Loop 2024 motorcycle race in Sikatuna. The incident prompts the Bohol Provincial Government to announce that it would no longer allow the race to be held.
- April 21 – Iñigo Anton finishes third place at the male solo division of the 2024 Taipei International Gymkhana Prize (TIGP) in Taipei, Taiwan.
- April 28 – Reigning Junior Karter of the Year Ryan Sy finishes third runner-up at the Inf1nity IAME Series Asia at Bira Circuit in Bangkok, Thailand.
- May 6 – Bianca Bustamante of McLaren Racing finishes second place at the second round of the 2024 F1 Academy season at Miami International Autodrome in Miami, Florida, United States.

=== Rowing ===
- June 26–30 – The Philippine national team wins one gold, five silver, and twelve bronze medals at the 2024 Southeast Asian Rowing Federation Championships in Haiphong, Vietnam.

=== Rugby ===
- October 5 – The Philippines national rugby union team wins a gold medal at the Asia Rugby Emirates Sevens Trophy in Nepal after defeating Chinese Taipei 27–14 in the final, while the Philippines women's national rugby sevens team also wins the women's division after defeating India 7-5.

=== Sailing ===
- December 26–28 – The Centennial 7 becomes the first vessel sailed by an all-Filipino crew to compete at the Sydney to Hobart Yacht Race in Australia, but fails to finish the event due to bad weather.

=== Sambo ===
- March 3 – The Philippine delegation wins three gold, one silver, and one bronze medal at the 2024 Dutch Sambo Open in Dalfsen, The Netherlands.

=== Sepak takraw ===
- May 18–26 – The Philippines men's national sepak takraw team participates at the 2024 ISTAF World Cup in Kuala Lumpur, Malaysia.

=== Skateboarding ===
- February 4–5 – The Philippines hosts the 2024 Southeast Asian Street Skateboarding Competition in Baler, Aurora. The Philippine delegation wins one silver, and two bronze medals.
- February 22–25 – The Philippines hosts the Downhill Skateboarding, Street Luge World Championships in Tagaytay. The tournament concludes with Rydelle Abarico winning silver in the women's division.

=== Softball ===
- April 17 – The Adamson Lady Falcons win their 11th consecutive UAAP Softball Championship during UAAP Season 86 after defeating the UP Fighting Maroons 4-3 in the UP Baseball Field in Quezon City.
- June 12–16 – The Philippine national team finishes in sixth place at the 2025 Men's Softball World Cup group stage in Sonora, Mexico.

=== Speedcubing ===
- May 26 – Sean Patrick Villanueva sets a new world record for the fastest 3x3x3 Rubik's Cube solved one-handed in an average of 8.09 seconds held at Quezon City Open II 2024 at U.P. Town Center, Quezon City, beating by 8.62 seconds in an average, the previous record set by American Max Park.
- June 30 – Sean Patrick Villanueva sets a new world record for the fastest 3x3x3 Rubik's Cube solved one-handed in a single solve of 6.05 seconds held at Clocked In Quezon City 2024 at Amoranto Sports Complex, Quezon City, beating by 6.20 seconds in single solve, the previous record set by American Max Park.

=== Surfing ===
- February 7 – Jay-R Esquivel wins the inaugural WSL Baler International Pro in Baler, Aurora after ruling the men’s longboard qualifying series.

=== Swimming ===
- February 26 – March 9 – Originally scheduled in 2020 but postponed due to the COVID-19 pandemic, the 11th Asian Age Group Championships is held at the New Clark City Aquatic Center in Capas, Tarlac. The Philippine delegation finishes 14th overall after winning one gold, one silver, and four bronze medals.
- May 17 – Para-swimmer Angel Otom wins the gold and silver medals at the 2024 Citi Para Swimming World Series in Singapore.

=== Taekwondo ===
- May 17 – The Philippine delegation wins one gold, one silver, and five bronze medals at the 8th Asian Taekwondo Poomsae in Da Nang, Vietnam.
- October 4 – Tachiana Mangin wins a gold medal at the 2024 World Taekwondo Junior Championships in Chuncheon, South Korea.

=== Tennis ===
- March 30 – Alex Eala and her French partner Estelle Cascino win the W25 Croissy-Beaubourg ITF doubles tournament of the 2024 Open de Seine-et-Marne in France after defeating British-French partners Maia Lumsden and Jessika Ponchet in two sets, 7–5, 7–6 (7–4).
- November 20–23 – The Philippines Davis Cup team is promoted to Group IV at the 2024 Davis Cup in Bahrain.
- November 25–30 – The Philippines Billie Jean King Cup team is promoted to Asia/Oceania Zone Group II at the 2024 Billie Jean King Cup in Bahrain.

=== Trail Running ===
- June 19–23 – The Southeast Asian Trail Running Cup is held in Bontoc, Mountain Province.

=== Volleyball ===
- February 10 – The Petro Gazz Angels win the 2024 PNVF Champions League for Women after defeating the Cignal HD Spikers in three sets 25–19, 27–25, 25–22.
- February 17 – The Cignal HD Spikers win the 2024 PNVF Champions League for Men after defeating the D' Navigators Iloilo in four sets 27–25, 31–33, 25–16, 25–18.
- March 20 – The Fédération Internationale de Volleyball awards the Philippines with the hosting rights of the 2025 FIVB Volleyball Men's World Championship to be held from September 12 to 28.
- April 6 – The Philippines finishes in the round of 16 at the Smart Asian Volleyball Confederation Beach Tour Nuvali Open in Santa Rosa, Laguna after the women’s team loses 16–21, 15–21 to Australia while the men’s team loses 20–22, 15–21 to Iran.
- April 14 – The Philippine men's team wins silver in the FIVB Volleyball World Beach Pro Tour Futures in Santa Rosa, Laguna after losing 21–16, 16–21, 13–15 to the Czech Republic.
- May 10 – The Cignal HD Spikers win the 2024 Spikers' Turf Open Conference after defeating the Criss Cross King Crunchers 2–0 in a best-of-three game series.
- May 12 - The Creamline Cool Smashers win the 2024 Premier Volleyball League All-Filipino Conference championship title after defeating Choco Mucho Flying Titans 3–2 in a best-of-three game series at the Araneta Coliseum in Cubao, Quezon City.
- May 15:
  - The Philippine National Volleyball Federation unveils a new moniker called "Alas Pilipinas" for both the men's and women's national team.
  - The NU Bulldogs and NU Lady Bulldogs win the UAAP Season 86 men's and women's volleyball championship title after defeating the UST Growling Tigers and Tigresses 2–0 in the best-of-three game series at the SM Mall of Asia Arena in Bay City, Pasay.
- May 22–29 – The Philippines hosts the 2024 Asian Women's Volleyball Challenge Cup at Rizal Memorial Coliseum in Manila. The Philippines finishes in third place in the tournament after defeating Australia 3–0 to claim its first medal in an Asian-level championship.
- May 26:
  - The Perpetual Altas win the NCAA Season 99 men's volleyball tournament after defeating the EAC Generals 2–0 in a best-of-three game series.
  - The Benilde Lady Blazers win the NCAA Season 99 women's volleyball tournament after defeating the Letran Lady Knights 2–0 in a best-of-three game series.
- June 2–9 – The Philippine national team participates at the 2024 Asian Men's Volleyball Challenge Cup in Bahrain. The Philippine team finishes in tenth place after losing to Thailand 3–1 on June 7.
- June 13 – The Philippine national team wins bronze at the 22nd Princess Cup SEA U18 Championship in Nakhon Pathom, Thailand after defeating Australia 3–0.
- June 18–23 – The Philippines co-hosts the 2024 FIVB Men's Volleyball Nations League preliminary round held at the Mall of Asia Arena in Pasay.
- July 4–7 – The 2024 FIVB Women's Volleyball Challenger Cup is held at the Ninoy Aquino Stadium in Manila. The Philippine national team finishes unplaced after losing to Vietnam 3–0 on July 5.
- July 16 – The NU Lady Bulldogs win the 2024 Shakey's Super League National Invitationals after defeating the FEU Lady Tamaraws 2–0 in a best-of-three game series.
- August 4 – The Philippine national team finishes in third place at the SEA V.League in Vĩnh Phúc, Vietnam after defeating Indonesia 3–1.
- August 11 – The Philippine national team finishes in third place at the second leg of the SEA V.League in Nakhon Ratchasima, Thailand after defeating Indonesia 3–1.
- August 30 – Philippine National Volleyball Federation president Ramon Suzara is elected as president of the Asian Volleyball Confederation.
- September 4 – The Creamline Cool Smashers clinch the 2024 Premier Volleyball League Reinforced Conference title after defeating the Akari Chargers 3–0 at the PhilSports Arena in Pasig. On September 12, the said team also clinch the 2024 Premier Volleyball League Invitational Conference title, including their first grand slam title after defeating the Cignal HD Spikers 3–2 at the Araneta Coliseum in Cubao, Quezon City. This is also their tenth overall championship title for a year, a season and three conferences in the Premier Volleyball League history since it was established in 2004 as the inter-collegiate Shakey's V-League.
- October 4 – The UST Golden Tigresses win the 2024 V-League Collegiate Challenge after defeating the FEU Lady Tamaraws 3–1 in a best-of-three game series at the PhilSports Arena in Pasig. In the men's division, the FEU Tamaraws win the competition for the first time after defeating the De La Salle Green Spikers 3–0.
- November 18 – Asian Volleyball Confederation president Ramon Suzara is elected as executive vice-president of the FIVB.
- November 27 – The Quezon Tangerines win the 2024 MPVA season after defeating Biñan Tatak Gel Volley Angels 2–0 in a best-of-three game series.
- December 15 – The Cignal HD Spikers wins 2024 Spikers' Turf Invitational Conference after defeating Criss Cross King Crunchers in three sets (25–19, 25–19, 26–24).

=== Weightlifting ===
- February 10 – The Philippine delegation finishes in 13th place at the 2024 Asian Weightlifting Championships in Tashkent, Uzbekistan after winning three silver and one bronze medals.
- September 20–28 – The Philippine delegation participates at the 2024 World Junior Weightlifting Championships in León, Spain.

=== Wushu ===
- April 21–26 – The Philippine delegation wins a gold and bronze medals at the 2024 International Wushu Invitational Tournament in Jiangsu, China.

=== Multi-sport events ===
- January 19 – February 1 – The 3-strong Philippine delegation participates at the 2024 Winter Youth Olympics in Gangwon, South Korea.
- January 29 – The 2024 PSA Annual Awards is held at the Diamond Hotel in Manila, with pole vaulter Ernest John Obiena recognized as PSA Athlete of the Year.
- March 19 – The World Anti-Doping Agency removes the Philippine Sports Commission from its anti-doping compliance watchlist.
- March 20 – The inaugural edition of PSC–PCW Women in Sports Awards is held at Rizal Memorial Coliseum in Manila, with tennis player Alex Eala and football player Sarina Bolden recognized as Athletes of the Year.
- April 19–20 – The Luzon leg of the Indigenous Peoples (IP) Games is held in Salcedo, Ilocos Sur, with succeeding legs planned in Bacolod and General Santos.
- July 6–17 – The 64th edition of the Palarong Pambansa is held in Cebu City. The National Capital Region emerges as the winner in the overall medal tally with 98 gold, 66 silver, and 74 bronze medals.
- July 25 – American sports network ESPN releases the Top 25 Asian Athletes of the 21st century with boxer Manny Pacquiao named as top 1 athlete, weightlifter Hidilyn Diaz at top 19, and basketball player June Mar Fajardo at top 25.
- July 27 – August 12 – The 22-strong Philippine delegation finishes 37th overall at the 2024 Summer Olympics in Paris, France after winning two gold and two bronze medals.
- August 28 – September 8 – The 6-strong Philippine delegation competes at the 2024 Summer Paralympics in Paris, France.
- September 4 – The University Athletic Association of the Philippines issues new rules reducing the years of eligibility of collegiate athletes transferring between member schools by two years.
- September 28–29 – The Visayas leg of the IP Games is held in Bago, Negros Occidental.
- November 23–28 – The 15th edition of Batang Pinoy is held in Puerto Princesa with Pasig winning the overall medal tally with 105 gold, 64 silver, and 116 bronze medals.
- December 5 – The 4th Siklab Youth Sports Awards is held at Market! Market! in Taguig.

== Deaths ==
- February 10 – Arnold Villanueva (b. 1966), head coach of the Letran Cheering Squad
- May 1 – Elmer Yanga (b. 1945), PBA manager (Pop Cola Panthers)
- May 25 – Janisa Johnson (b. 1991), American Premier Volleyball League player (BaliPure Purest Water Defenders, Petro Gazz Angels) and Finals MVP (2019 Reinforced Conference)
- June 18:
  - Alice Lluch Andrada (b. 1933), golfer
  - Yoyong Martirez (b. 1946), basketball player (San Miguel, National team)
- June 19 – Boy Clarino (b. 1955), basketball player (Toyota Super Corollas)
- July 13 – Chino Trinidad (b. 1967), sports journalist, commentator and league commissioner
- July 14 – Jofel "Jongjong" Fuentes (b. 1973), triathlete
- July 29 – Leonardo "Remy" Monteverde (b. 1937), basketball player (Mapúa Cardinals)
- August 17 – Eugene Quilban (b. 1966), basketball player (San Sebastian Stags, Alaska Aces, Pepsi Hotshots)
- August 26 – Sven-Göran Eriksson (b. 1948), coach of the Philippines national football team from Sweden (2018–2019)
- October 4 – Carlos Brosas (b. 1955), Olympic swimmer (1972) and coach (1988, 2008, and 2012)
- November 13 – Ricky Dandan (b. 1963), basketball coach
- November 15 – Alex Prieto (b. 1936), golfer
- November 18 – Felix "Cassius" Casas (b. 1966), golfer
- December 18 – Go Teng Kok (b. 1944), former president of Philippine Athletics Track and Field Association
- December 24 – Edwin Gastanes (b. 1958), lawyer and secretary-general of the Philippine Football Federation (2013–2023)
- December 29 – Janrick Soriano (b. 1988), football player (Kaya F.C.–Iloilo)

== See also ==
- 2024 in the Philippines
- 2024 in sports
