= 2016 Asian Dragon Boat Championships =

Tournament information
- Sport: Dragon boat
- Dates: November 11–12, 2016
- Host(s): Puerto Princesa, Philippines
- Participants: 6 nations

Final positions
- Champions: Philippines
- 1st runners-up: Chinese Taipei
- 2nd runners-up: Japan

Tournament statistics
- Events: 8 (in 4 categories)

The 2016 Asian Dragon Boat Championships was hosted from November 11–12, 2016 in Puerto Princesa, Palawan and was organized by the Philippine Canoe-Kayak Federation.

The 2016 edition marked the first time the Philippines hosted the continental tournament.

== Events ==
Events in 4 categories will be held in two days.

Rank	10 seater Small boat	20 seater Standard boat
Junior Mixed (for ages 15-18)	Yes	
Men	Yes	Yes
Women	Yes	

== Participants ==
10 nations entered the tournament but four nations (Brunei, India, Iran, Singapore) did not compete in a single event leaving six nations as participants.

- ~~Brunei~~
- Chinese Taipei
- Hong Kong
- ~~India~~
- ~~Iran~~
- Indonesia
- Japan
- Philippines (hosts)
- ~~Singapore~~
- Thailand

== Results ==
=== Junior Mixed ===
==== Small Boat 500 meters ====
Rank	Team	Time
Heat
1	Chinese Taipei	02:11.974
2	Philippines	02:12.631
Final
1st place, gold medalist(s)	Philippines	02:10.387
2nd place, silver medalist(s)	Chinese Taipei	02:11.197

==== Small Boat 200 meters ====
Rank	Team	Time
Heat
1	Chinese Taipei	51.360
2	Philippines	51.49
Final
1st place, gold medalist(s)	Chinese Taipei	50.65
2nd place, silver medalist(s)	Philippines	51.54

=== Men ===
==== Standard Boat ====
===== 500 meters =====
Rank	Team	Time
Heat
1	Philippines	01:51.564
2	Chinese Taipei	01:56.517
Final
1st place, gold medalist(s)	Philippines	01:52.720
2nd place, silver medalist(s)	Chinese Taipei	01:57.602

===== 200 meters =====
====== Heats ======
Rank	Team	Time
Heat 1
1	Philippines	44.655
2	Chinese Taipei	46.777
Heat 2
1	Philippines	46.935
2	Chinese Taipei	49.692

====== Final ======
Rank	Team	Time
1st place, gold medalist(s)	Philippines	46.93
2nd place, silver medalist(s)	Chinese Taipei	49.93

==== Small Boat ====
===== 500 meters =====
====== Heats ======
Rank	Team	Time
Heat 1
1	Philippines	02:08.622
2	Japan	02:08.929
3	Indonesia	02:09.379
4	Chinese Taipei	02:14.479
5	Hong Kong	02:16.497
Heat 2
1	Indonesia	02:06.683
2	Philippines	02:06.758
3	Japan	02:07.035
4	Chinese Taipei	02:10.553
5	Hong Kong	02:13.635

====== Final ======
Rank	Team	Time
1st place, gold medalist(s)	Japan	02:03.764
2nd place, silver medalist(s)	Philippines	02:03.847
3rd place, bronze medalist(s)	Indonesia	02:03.890
4	Chinese Taipei	02:07.457

===== 200 meters =====
====== Heats ======
Rank	Team	Time
Heat 1
1	Indonesia	49.742
2	Japan	50.912
3	Philippines	51.325
4	Chinese Taipei	51.585
5	Hong Kong	52.535
Heat 2
1	Indonesia	Unknown
2	Japan	Unknown
3	Philippines	Unknown
4	Chinese Taipei	Unknown
5	Hong Kong	Unknown

====== Final ======
Rank	Team	Time
1st place, gold medalist(s)	Philippines	46.808
2nd place, silver medalist(s)	Japan	48.681
3rd place, bronze medalist(s)	Indonesia	48.903

=== Women ===
==== Small Boat 500 meters ====
Rank	Team	Time
Heat
1	Thailand	02:10.101
2	Philippines	02:12.778
3	Indonesia	02:15.005
-	Hong Kong	DNS
Final
1st place, gold medalist(s)	Thailand	02:19.145
2nd place, silver medalist(s)	Philippines	02:22.128
3rd place, bronze medalist(s)	Indonesia	02:22.795

==== Small Boat 200 meters ====
Rank	Team	Time
Heat
1	Philippines	55.425
2	Thailand	55.530
3	Indonesia	56.618
-	Hong Kong	DNS
Final
1st place, gold medalist(s)	Philippines	54.453
2nd place, silver medalist(s)	Thailand	54.753
3rd place, bronze medalist(s)	Indonesia	55.351
-	Hong Kong	DNS

== Medal table ==
Rank	Nation	Gold	Silver	Bronze	Total
1	Philippines (PHI)	5	3	0	8
2	Chinese Taipei (TPE)	1	3	0	4
3	Japan (JPN)	1	1	0	2
3	Thailand (THA)	1	1	0	2
5	Indonesia (INA)	0	0	4	4
Totals (5 entries)		8	8	4	20
