= Ricky Palou =

- Born: Richard William N. Palou; February 24, 1948 (age 78)
- Occupation: Sports executive
- Basketball career

Career information
- College: Ateneo

Career history

Playing
- –: San Miguel

Coaching
- 1996: Ateneo

Richard William N. Palou (born February 24, 1948) is a Filipino sports executive and retired basketball player.

== Education ==
Richard William N. Palou was born on February 24, 1948. He attended the Ateneo de Manila University. He is also a holder of a master's degree.

== Basketball career ==
Ricky Palou was a student-athlete when he was still studying at the Ateneo de Manila University. He track and field athlete at the National Collegiate Athletic Association (NCAA). Palou was part of the Ateneo Blue Eagles men's basketball team that won the NCAA Season 45 in 1969. Palou was noted for sporting long hair and a beard.

Palou played for the San Miguel in the Manila Industrial and Commercial Athletic Association (MICAA) before the team joined the Philippine Basketball Association. With basketball as a profession still not lucrative at the time, Palou left basketball to become a regular employee at San Miguel Corporation as a brand manager.

== Sports administration ==
=== Early years ===
While working at Far East Bank where he stayed for 20 years, Palou was exposed to women's volleyball and was involved in the organization of an inter-bank league.

Jun Bernardino tasked Palou to assist in the operations of the PBA for two to three years in the technical and finance departments. He left a year after Bernardino's departure from the PBA.

From 2004 until 2015, Palou was the atletic director for the Ateneo's program.

=== Premier Volleyball League ===
In 2004, Palou along with Bernardino, Mauricio Martelino, and Tonyboy Liao established Sports Vision. They initially organized a high school basketball league for one season but had poor attendance. Palou convinced his partners to organize a women's volleyball league instead citing the success of the hosting of the 2000 FIVB Volleyball World Grand Prix and was convinced of the potential of the sport from his own experience in inter-bank volleyball league. Rhea Navarro strongly supported the idea.

The Shakey's V-League was established which later became the Premier Volleyball League (PVL). In 2020, the PVL became a professional league sanctioned by the Games and Amusement Board.

=== Philippine National Volleyball Federation ===
Palou was involved in the Philippine National Volleyball Federation (PNVF). In the first election of the federation in 2021, he intended to run as president but withdrew his candidacy in support of the remaining candidate Ramon Suzara. He later became vice president. Palou became the chairman of the national teams program of the PNVF on August 1, 2024.
