= ZUS (disambiguation) =

ZUS may refer to:

- Zus Coffee, a Malaysian coffee shop chain
  - Zus Coffee Thunderbelles, a women's volleyball team in the Philippines
- Social Insurance Institution, Zakład Ubezpieczeń Społecznych, Polish state social insurance agency
- Zone urbaine sensible (Sensitive urban zone), urban area in France defined to be a high-priority target for city policy
