= 4th Siklab Youth Sports Awards =

Award ceremony

- Date: December 5, 2024
- Location: Market! Market!, Bonifacio Global City, Taguig
- Country: Philippines

The 4th Siklab Youth Sports Awards is an awarding ceremony that recognizes the youth and junior Philippine national athletes that have been triumphed in different local, national and international competitions for the year 2024.

== Details ==
The awarding ceremony will be occur at the Market! Market!, Bonifacio Global City, Taguig on December 5, 2024 with a total of 80 athletes and personalities from 37 sports to be given recognition in the awards night.

The organizer, Philippine Sports Commission-Philippine Paralympic Committee-Philippine Olympic Committee (PSC-PPC-POC) Media Group, an affiliate of the Philippine Sportswriters Association, is a group of sportswriters that cover the country's top sports governing bodies as well as more than 70 National Sports Associations and Team Philippines' campaign in international competitions such as the Olympics, Asian Games, Southeast Asian Games, Asian Para Games and ASEAN Para Games.

== Honor roll ==
=== Youth Heroes Awards ===
- Ashley-Mae Michelle Harrison (Fencing)
- James Ajido (Swimming)
- Isabella Butler (Jiu-Jitsu)
- Ruelle Canino (Chess)
- Angeline Colonia (Weightlifting)
- Kheith Rhynne Cruz (Table Tennis)
- Lovely Inan (Weightlifting)
- Rianne Malixi (Golf)
- Tachiana Mangin (Taekwondo)
- Lyre Anie Ngina (Muaythai)
- Janbrix Ramiscal (Muaythai)
- Eldrew Yulo (Gymnastics)
- John Andre Aguja (Cycling)
- Kieffer Alas (Basketball)
- Jeniva Consigna (Sambo)
- Marc Custodio (Bowling)
- Ana Bhianca Espenilla (Athletics)
- Joseph Anthony Godbout (Modern Pentathlon)
- Jasmine Mojdeh (Swimming)
- JR Pandi (Badminton)
- Nick Angelo Payla (Boxing)
- Jonathan Reyes (Squash)
- Brandon Sanchez (Baseball)
- Naina Dominique Tagle (Archery)
- Gavin Moses Ti (Obstacle Course Racing)

=== Rising Youth Stars Awards ===
- Aielle Aguilar (Jiu-Jitsu)
- TJ Amaro (Swimming)
- Nicol Canlas (Fencing)
- Yuna Canlas (Fencing)
- Hagia del Castillo (Fencing)
- Mitchloni Dinauanao and Francis Dave Sombal (Dancesport)
- Willa Galvez (Fencing)
- Geoffrey Gan (Golf)
- Nicole Gan (Golf)
- Dawn Jasmine Gothong (Figure Skating)
- Behrouz Mojdeh (Swimming)
- Royeth Rosa (Muaythai)

=== Super Kids Awards ===
- Lucho Aguilar (Wrestling)
- Xian Baguhin (Boxing)
- Mariam Grace Balisme (Wrestling)
- Jhoanna Jelel Barbero (Wushu)
- Julia Bintulan (Karate)
- Paul Sondrei Capinig (Wrestling)
- Carlstein Jade Dulay (Sailing)
- Danielle Escolano (Bowling)
- Josa Gonzales (Sailing)
- Zyche Mae Jizmundo (Pencak Silat)
- Marc John Lazo (Wushu)
- Thirdy Mana-Ay (Cycling)
- Bashy Manalac (Karate)
- Marvin Mandac (Cycling)
- Ella Olaso (Wrestling and Jiu-Jitsu)
- Shaina Nitura (Volleyball)
- Elaiza Yulo (Gymnastics)

=== Special awards ===
- Godfather of the Year: Terry Capistrano (Athletics; president, Philippine Athletics Track and Field Association)
- Lifetime Achievement Award: Bong Go (Senator)
- Sports Idol: Nesthy Petecio (Boxing)
- Trailblazer of the Year: Arjo Atayde (Representative, Quezon City 1st District)

== See also ==
- 2024 in Philippine sports
- 2025 PSA Annual Awards
- PSA Athlete of the Year
