= 2024 ICF Dragon Boat World Championships =

Coordinates: 9°44′43.4″N 118°43′55.5″E

- 2024

Tournament information
- Sport: Canoeing (dragon boat)
- Dates: October 28–November 3, 2024
- Host(s): Philippines
- Venue(s): 1
- Participants: 24 countries

The 2024 ICF Dragon Boat World Championships is an international canoeing competition in dragon boat hosted in Puerto Princesa, Palawan, Philippines from October 28 to November 3, 2024. The tournament was hosted under the auspices of the Philippine Canoe Kayak Dragonboat Federation.

This marks the first the tournament was hosted in Southeast Asia. The host was the overall champions.

== Venue ==
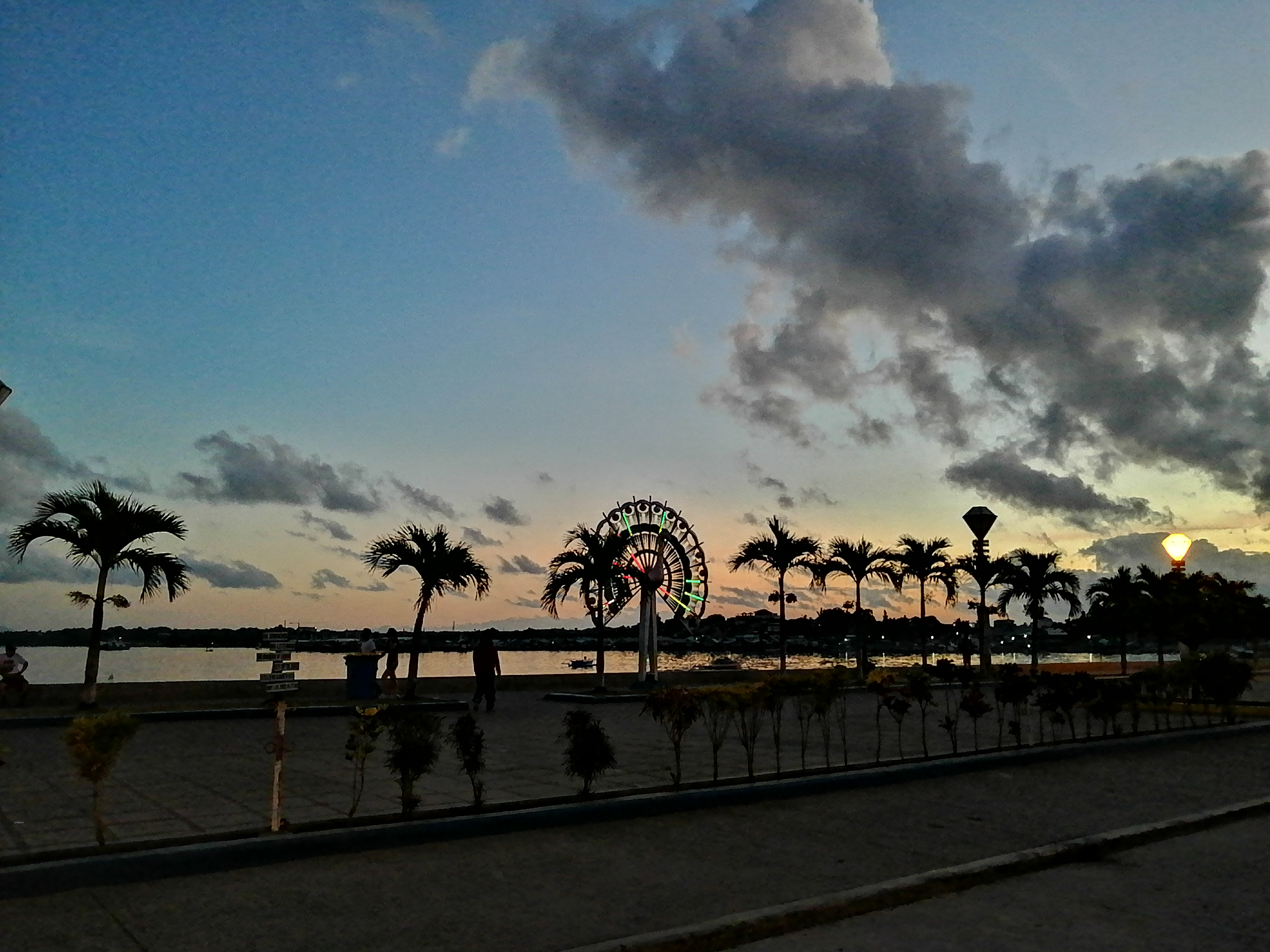
Puerto Princesa Baywalk

The course for the 2024 ICF Dragon Boat World Championships was set up along the waters of the Puerto Princesa Baywalk promenade.

== Participating nations ==
- Bulgaria
- Cambodia
- Canada
- Chinese Taipei
- Czech Republic
- France
- Germany
- Hong Kong
- Hungary
- India
- Individual Neutral Athletes (Note: Composed of rowers recruited by the Russian Canoe Federation. In other sports competition, Belarus along with Russia also competes under the Individual Neutral Athletes (AIN) status)
- Indonesia
- Iran
- Malaysia
- Myanmar
- Philippines
- Poland
- Singapore
- South Korea
- Sweden
- Spain
- Thailand
- Ukraine
- United States

== Events ==
Event Category	10 seater			20 seater		
Event Category	200m	500m	2000m	200m	500m	2000m
Open – Seniors	Yes	Yes	Yes	Yes	Yes	Yes
Open – Juniors	Yes	Yes	Yes	No	No	No
Open – Masters 40+	Yes	Yes	Yes	Yes	Yes	Yes
Open – Masters 50+	Yes	Yes	Yes	No	No	No
Women – Seniors	Yes	Yes	Yes	Yes	Yes	Yes
Women – Juniors	Yes	Yes	Yes	No	No	No
Women – Masters 40+	Yes	Yes	Yes	Yes	Yes	Yes
Women – Masters 50+	Yes	Yes	Yes	No	No	No
Mixed – Seniors	WGQ	WGQ	WGQ	Yes	Yes	Yes
Mixed – Juniors	Yes	Yes	Yes	No	No	No
Mixed – Masters 40+	Yes	Yes	Yes	Yes	Yes	Yes
Mixed – Masters 50+	Yes	Yes	Yes	No	No	No

Source: ICF

== Medal summary ==
Medal tally includes Seniors, Juniors, Masters 40+, and Masters 50+ events.

* Host nation (Philippines)

Rank	Nation	Gold	Silver	Bronze	Total
1	Philippines*	11	20	8	39
2	Thailand	8	0	0	8
3	Individual Neutral Athletes	6	3	3	12
4	Ukraine	5	0	1	6
5	Canada	4	6	4	14
6	Hungary	4	4	4	12
7	Iran	4	3	5	12
8	Czech Republic	3	2	4	9
9	Poland	3	1	1	5
10	United States	2	0	1	3
11	Indonesia	1	1	1	3
12	Myanmar	1	1	0	2
12	Spain	1	1	0	2
14	Hong Kong	1	0	1	2
15	Germany	0	5	2	7
15	Singapore	0	5	2	7
17	India	0	1	7	8
18	Malaysia	0	1	1	2
19	Chinese Taipei	0	1	0	1
20	Sweden	0	0	3	3
21	Bulgaria	0	0	0	0
21	Cambodia	0	0	0	0
21	France	0	0	0	0
21	South Korea	0	0	0	0
Totals (24 entries)		54	55	48	157

Source: ICF

== Results ==
=== Seniors ===
==== Open ====
Event	Gold	Silver	Bronze
10-seater 200m	Thailand	Malaysia	Iran
20-seater 200m	Thailand	Philippines	Hong Kong
10-seater 500m	Thailand	Iran	Individual Neutral Athletes
20-seater 500m	Thailand	Philippines	Individual Neutral Athletes
10-seater 2000m	Spain	Iran	Malaysia
20-seater 2000m	Czech Republic	Philippines	India

==== Women ====
Event	Gold	Silver	Bronze
10-seater 200m	Thailand	Singapore	Ukraine
20-seater 200m	Thailand	Individual Neutral Athletes	Philippines
10-seater 500m	Thailand	Iran	Individual Neutral Athletes
20-seater 500m			
10-seater 2000m	Iran	Individual Neutral Athletes	Philippines
20-seater 2000m	Individual Neutral Athletes	Philippines	Iran

==== Mixed ====
Event	Gold	Silver	Bronze
10-seater 200m	Indonesia	Myanmar	Chinese Taipei
20-seater 200m	Philippines	Canada	Individual Neutral Athletes
10-seater 500m	Myanmar	Hungary	Indonesia
20-seater 500m	Ukraine	Philippines	Individual Neutral Athletes
10-seater 2000m	Hungary	Indonesia	Czech Republic
20-seater 2000m	Czech Republic	Spain	Individual Neutral Athletes

== Qualification for the 2025 World Games ==
Teams participating in all three mixed 10-seater races are eligible to qualify for the 2025 World Games in Chengdu, China. There are 12 quota places, with ten places for contestation. The top teams with the highest overall points across will qualify. Thailand and Indonesia are already qualified via the ICF Dragon Boat World Cup in Yichang. World Games host, China has a reserved berth. The remaining nine qualifying teams were confirmed on 3 November 2024. AIN originally qualified but the next ranked team South Korea did.

Event Country	10-seater race			Overall		Qualification
Event Country	200m	500m	2000m	Pts	Rank	Qualification
Indonesia	1st (20)	3rd (18)	2nd (19)	57	—	Already qualified for the 2025 World Games through the ICF Dragon Boat World Cup
Hungary	6th (15)	2nd (19)	1st (20)	54	1st	Qualified for the 2025 World Games
Myanmar	2nd (19)	1st (20)	8th (13)	52	2nd	Qualified for the 2025 World Games
Spain	4th (17)	8th (13)	4th (17)	47	3rd	Qualified for the 2025 World Games
Ukraine	7th (14)	5th (16)	7th (14)	44	4th	Qualified for the 2025 World Games
Chinese Taipei	3rd (18)	6th (15)	12th (9)	42	5th	Qualified for the 2025 World Games
Thailand	8th (13)	9th (12)	5th (16)	41	—	Already qualified for the 2025 World Games through the ICF Dragon Boat World Cup
Czech Republic	9th (12)	11th (10)	3rd (18)	40	6th	Qualified for the 2025 World Games
Philippines	5th (16)	13th (8)	10th (11)	35	7th	Qualified for the 2025 World Games
Cambodia	10th (11)	7th (14)	11th (10)	35	8th	Qualified for the 2025 World Games
Individual Neutral Athletes	13th (8)	12th (9)	6th (15)	32	9th	Withdrew
South Korea	18th (3)	4th (17)	14th (7)	27	10th	Qualified for the 2025 World Games
Canada	11th (10)	18th (3)	9th (12)	25	11th	
Singapore	15th (6)	10th (11)	15th (6)	23	12th	
Germany	16th (5)	15th (6)	13th (8)	19	14th	
Hong Kong	12th (9)	16th (5)	18th (3)	17	16th	
United States	17th (4)	—	19th (2)	6	—	Ineligible for qualification

Rules for classification: 1) Total points; 2) 200m ranking 3) 500m ranking 4) 500m ranking 5) Drawing of lots
