= Tonyboy Liao =

Filipino sports executive (born 1956)

- Born: Anthony Liao; May 29, 1956 (age 70)
- Occupation: Sports executive
- Known for: Co-founder of Sports Vision

Anthony "Tonyboy" Liao (born May 29, 1956) is a Filipino sports executive who is the president of the Philippine National Volleyball Federation.

== Managerial career ==
Liao was the team manager of the Philippines women's national volleyball team which won the 1993 SEA Games gold medal.

He was also the manager of the De La Salle Lady Spikers and Ateneo Lady Eagles collaborating with Ricky Palou.

As Ateneo manager, he brought in Tai Bundit to coach the team. Liao left his role after Bundit also vacated his coaching position in 2018. During their stay, the collegiate team won UAAP Seasons 76 and 77 with former being Ateneo's first ever UAAP women's volleyball title.

== Sports administration ==
Liao was chairman of the beach volley council of the Asian Volleyball Confederation in the early 2000s.

In 2004, Liao along with Jun Bernardino, Mauricio Martelino, and Ricky Palou established Sports Vision. Sports Vision organized the Shakey's V-League (SVL) which became the Premier Volleyball League (PVL) in 2017.

In 2013, Liao denounced the Philippine Volleyball Federation for claiming credit for the rise of popularity of volleyball stating that the NCAA, UAAP, and SVL aren't even PVF-sanctioned.

In November 2025, Liao was elected as president of the Philippine National Volleyball Federation (PNVF) replacing Ramon Suzara on January 1, 2026. The FIVB certified the elections as valid. The FIVB later suspends the PNVF under Liao's leadership over serious governance issues on May 29, 2026.
