= Frank Lao =

Filipino sports executive and businessman

- Occupations: Sports executive, businessman
- Known for: Current president of the Philippine National Volleyball Federation, founder of Strong Group Athletics, owner of Choi Garden and Gloria Maris

Frank Lao is a Filipino sports executive and businessman who is the current president of the Philippine National Volleyball Federation (PNVF). He is also the owner of restaurants Choi Garden and Gloria Maris, and the founder of the sports organization Strong Group Athletics.

== Early life ==
Frank Lao was born to a Chinese father who emigrated from China to Davao in the Philippines when Frank was still at a young age. His father hails from British Hong Kong. Lao sold plasticware such as tabo and pails as a means of livelihood.

== Career ==
=== Business ===
Lao is associated with the Chinese restaurants Choi Garden and Gloria Maris which were acquired from previous owners. Lao bought a 35 percent stake in the Malaysian coffee shop chain Zus Coffee in 2023. His daughter heads the Choi Garden Group which brought Zus to the Philippines.

He also has stakes in the mining industry. He runs Kinetic Holdings Corp. which made a joint venture with Apollo Global Capital in 2021.

=== Sports ===
Lao is the founder of the Strong Group Athletics (SGA), an organization which sponsors and manages sports teams. The Farm Fresh Foxies and the Zus Coffee Thunderbelles which plays in the women's volleyball league, Premier Volleyball League are under Lao's SGA. SGA also has sponsored high school and university basketball teams in the Philippines.

Lao earlier has supported the La Salle Green Hills basketball program as its patron from 2017 to 2019. This was in support of his sons who are part of the high school's team. The Greenies won the National Collegiate Athletic Association Season 93 title in 2017.

==== PNVF presidency ====
Lao claimed the presidency of the Philippine National Volleyball Federation (PNVF) in June 2026 amidst the sports federation suspension by the Fédération Internationale de Volleyball. In 15 days of de facto tenure, Lao claimed to have settled the financial dispute between the federation and former Philippine national coach Jorge de Brito. The Philippine Olympic Committee deemed the tenure invalid due to it not being notified of Lao's election. On August 10, 2026, Lao was formally elected as PNVF president, with the POC supervising the elections.
