= Philippines national dragon boat team =

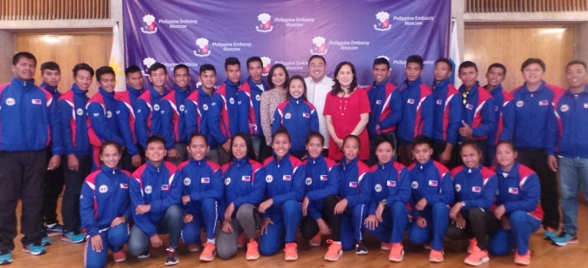
The Philippine dragon boat team which participated in the 2016 ICF World Championships in Moscow, Russia

The Philippines national dragon boat team is the national dragon boat team of the Philippines and represents the country in international dragon boat. There is an ongoing dispute between the Philippine Dragon Boat Federation and the Philippine Canoe-Kayak Dragon Boat Federation over which is the sole legitimate sporting body over the national dragon boat team. The Philippine Dragon Boat Federation is a member of the International Dragon Boat Federation while the Philippine Canoe-Kayak Dragon Boat Federation is the recognized by the Philippine Olympic Committee. However, the Court of Arbitration for Sport (CAS) have stated that as a Full Member of Sportaccord (the World Union of International Federations), the IDBF is the only recognized world governing body for dragon boating. Therefore, the IDBF Members are the national governing bodies for dragon boating in their own countries. The two organizations field their own dragon boat teams.

== Tournament records ==
=== International Dragon Boat Federation tournaments ===
All tournaments organized by the International Dragon Boat Federation (IDBF) were represented by the national team, fielded by the Philippine Dragon Boat Federation.

==== IDBF World Championships ====
Games	Gold	Silver	Bronze	Total	Rank	Reference
(Czech Republic) 2009 Prague	2	1	0	3	?	
(United States) 2011 Tampa Bay	5	2	0	7	?	
(Hungary) 2013 Szeged	0	2	2	4	?	
(Canada) 2015 Welland	4	0	0	4	?	

==== IDBF World Cup ====
Games	Gold	Silver	Bronze	Total	Rank	Reference
(China) 2014 Fuzhou	2	1	1	4	2nd	

==== IDBF Asian Championships ====
Games	Gold	Silver	Bronze	Total	Rank	Reference
(Australia) 2016 Adelaide	0	2	5	7	3rd	

=== International Canoe Federation tournaments ===
All tournaments organized by the International Canoe Federation (ICF) was represented by a Dragon Boat Team fielded by the Philippine Canoe Kayak Federation.

==== ICF World Championships ====
Games	Gold	Silver	Bronze	Total	Rank	Reference
(Italy) 2012 Milan	5	1	0	6	?	
(Poland) 2014 Poznań	5	3	3	11	4th	
(Russia) 2016 Moscow	3	1	2	6	3rd	
(United States) 2018 Gainesville	5	2	2	9	1st	
(Czech Republic) 2022 Račice	Did not enter			—	—	
(Philippines) 2024 Puerto Princesa	11	20	8	39	1st	
Total	—	—	—	—	—	—

==== ICF Asian Championships ====
Games	Gold	Silver	Bronze	Total	Rank	Reference
(Philippines) 2016 Puerto Princesa	5	3	0	8	1st	
(China) 2018 Dali Bai	2	0	0	2	–	
Total	-	-	-	–	–	–

==== Asian Games ====
Games	Gold	Silver	Bronze	Total	Rank	Reference
(China) 2010 Guangzhou	Did not enter				—N/a	
(Indonesia) 2018 Jakarta–Palembang	0	0	0	0	—N/a	
Total	-	-	-	–	–	–
