= Zus Coffee =

Malaysian coffee shop chain

Zuspresso (M) Sdn. Bhd.
- Industry: Coffee shop
- Founded: 2019; 7 years ago Kuala Lumpur, Malaysia
- Founders: Ian Chua; Venon Tian; Terence Ho
- Headquarters: 7, Jalan Penyajak U1/45A, Hicom-Glenmarie Industrial Park, 40150 Shah Alam, Selangor, Malaysia
- Number of locations: ≥ 1000 stores (Oct 2025)
- Area served: Southeast Asia
- Products: Coffee beverages, non-coffee beverage, baked goods, sandwiches
- Website: zuscoffee.com

Zuspresso (M) Sdn. Bhd., doing business as Zus Coffee (stylized as ZUS Coffee) is a Malaysian coffee shop chain.

== History ==
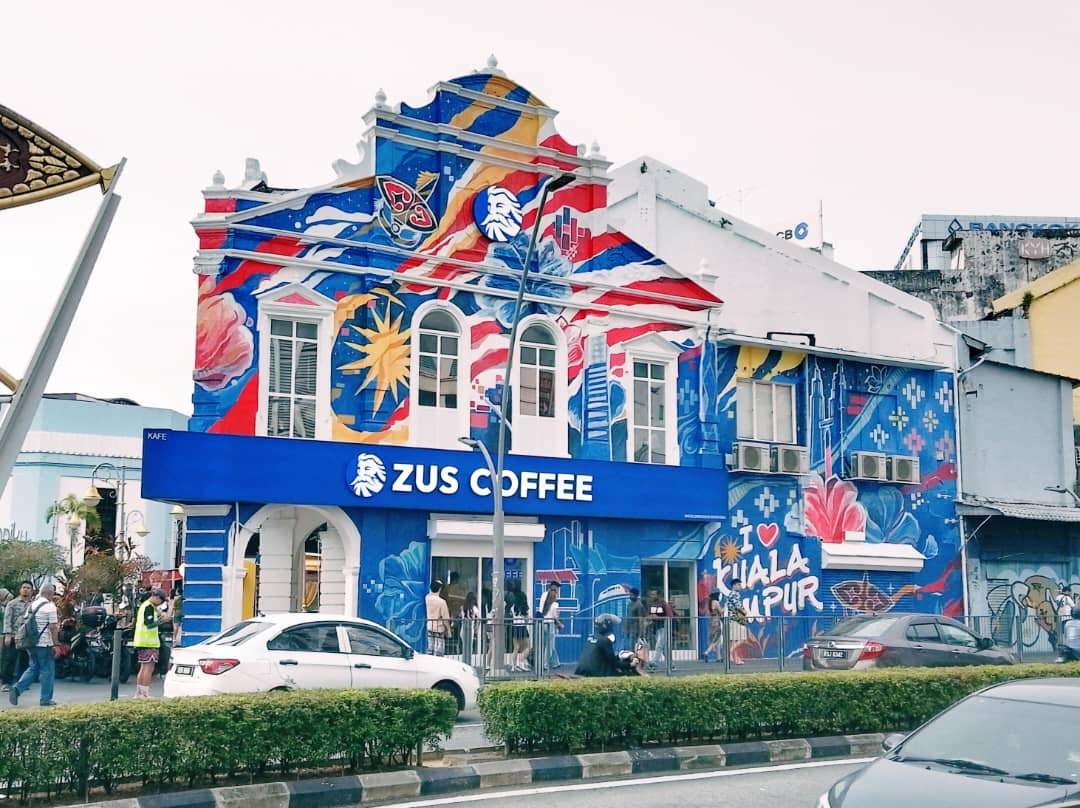
Zus Coffee in Pasar Seni

Zus Coffee opened its first outlet in November 2019 at a roughly 19 m^{2} (200 sq ft) kiosk at Binjai 8 in the Kuala Lumpur City Centre. It was founded by Venon Tian and Ian Chua, who had backgrounds in running start-ups and information technology. They developed the associated pickup-and-delivery mobile application even before they opened the first store.

The early years were marked by the COVID-19 pandemic. Quarantine measures made customers less inclined to drink coffee in "third places" or settings other than their residence or workplace. Zus Coffee on the other hand compared to most of its competitors would rely on the grab-and-go model.

By the end of 2023, there are 360 outlets in all of Malaysia.

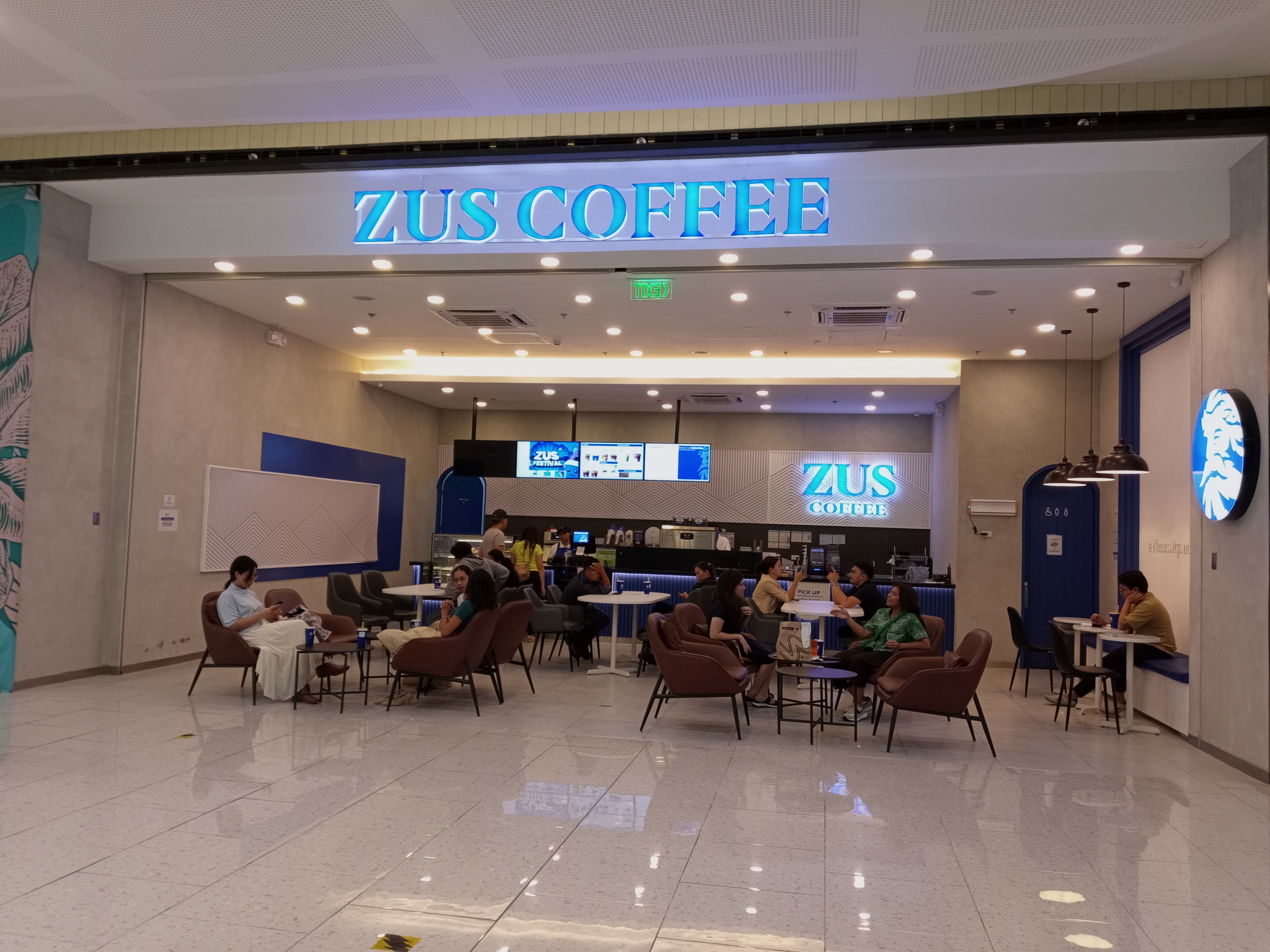
Zus Coffee in Cebu City, Philippines, 2025

In March 2023, Filipino businessman Frank Lao reportedly bought a 35 percent stake in Zus Coffee with the intention to expand the chain's operations to the Philippines. Zus Coffee opened its first Philippine branch at Eastwood Le Grand Tower 2 in Eastwood City, Quezon City in September 2023, marking their first expansion outside Malaysia.

Zus Coffee was one of several Malaysian coffee chains experiencing a surge in patronage following the worldwide boycott on Starbucks in response to its lawsuit towards the Starbucks Workers United union following the latter's social media communications on 10 October 2023 expressing solidarity with Gazan civilians affected by war waged by the Israeli army 3 days before.

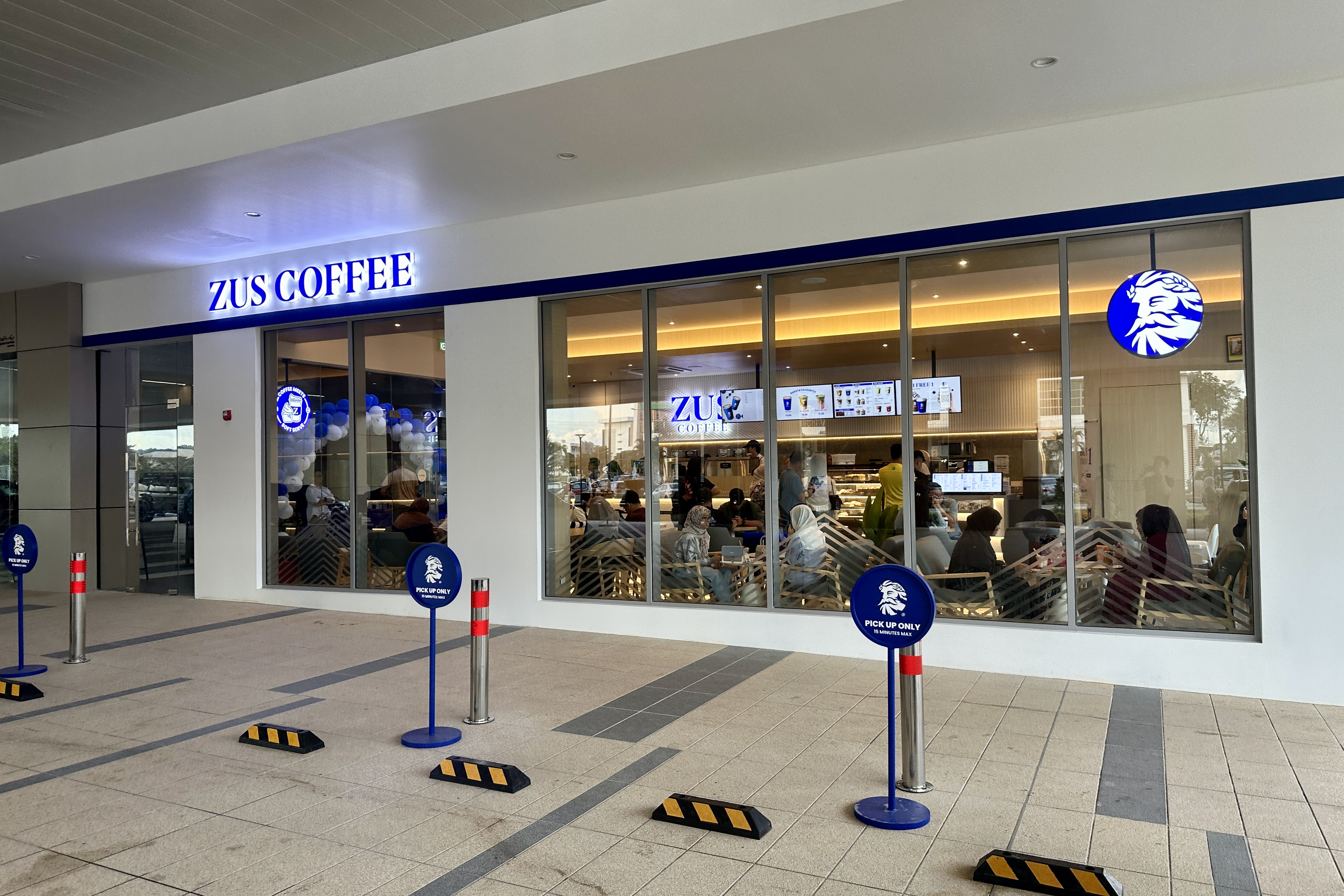
Zus Coffee in Bandar Seri Begawan, Brunei, 2024

Zus Coffee continued their expansion in Southeast Asia. In October 2024, Zus Coffee opened its first outlet in Singapore at Changi Airport. It then opened its first outlet in Brunei in November 2024. Zus Coffee opened its first two outlets in Thailand in August 2025. And more recently, Zus Coffee opened their first outlet in Indonesia within the Puri Indah Mall in Jakarta in 2026.

Zus Coffee in Jakarta, Indonesia, 2026

== Branding ==
In 2023, Zus' official communications published a rationale claiming that its logo portrays the Ethiopian shepherd Kaldi and that its name is a portmanteau of the words "zeal" and "us." This was a response to a Malaysian conservative-affiliated Facebook page which called on Muslims to boycott the brand, insisting that the branding resembled the Greek deity, Zeus.

Strong Group Athletics maintains a women's volleyball team in the Premier Volleyball League which is named after the coffee chain – the Zus Coffee Thunderbelles since 2024.

== Products and model ==
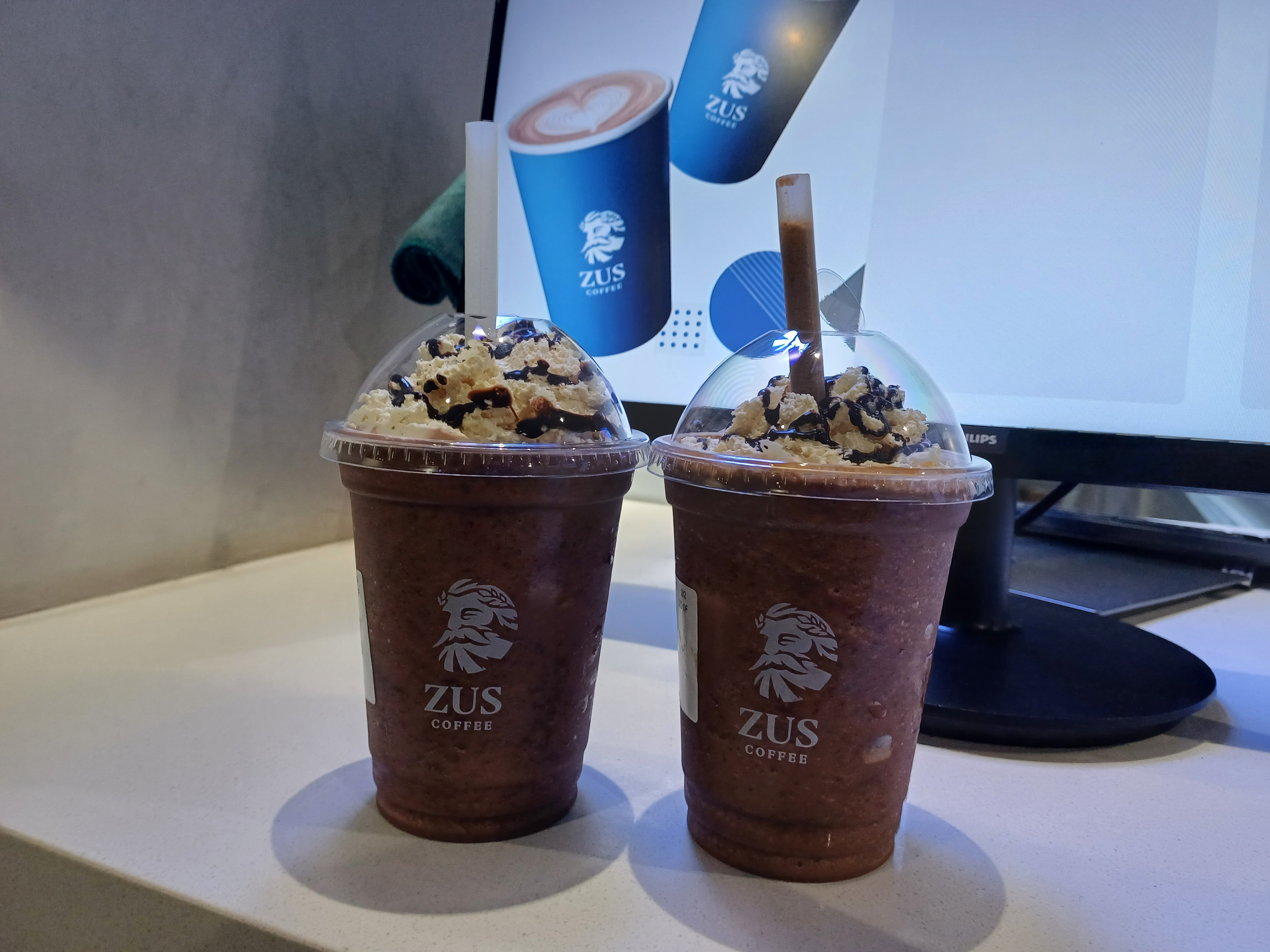
Zus Coffee frappuchinos.

Zus Coffee sells coffee-based beverages as well as pastries, sandwiches, and hot meals. It claims to sell Halal-certified products, avoiding haram ingredients such as those containing pork and alcohol. The business has its own dedicated ZUS Coffee app where customers can place their orders for delivery or pick-up. The app was inspired by the app used by Chinese coffee chain Luckin Coffee.

In April 2025, Zus Coffee diversified their products to local instant coffee through lifestyle innovation, under brand name of NGUPI.
