= 2024 ISTAF World Cup =

Sepaktakraw tournament

2024 ISTAF World Cup Piala Dunia ISTAF 2024

Tournament details
- Host country: Malaysia
- City: Kuala Lumpur
- Dates: 18–26 May 2024
- Teams: 21 countries (from International Sepaktakraw confederations)
- Venue: Titiwangsa Stadium

Final positions
- Champions: MR-PM: Malaysia; MD-PM: Malaysia; MT-PM: Thailand; MR-D1: Iran; MD-D1: Iran
- Runner-up: MR-PM:Thailand; MD-PM: Thailand; MD-D1: Chinese Taipei; MR-D1: Chinese Taipei

The 2024 ISTAF World Cup is the fourth edition of the ISTAF World Cup, held from 18 to 26 May 2024 at the Titiwangsa Stadium, Kuala Lumpur, Malaysia. Twenty-one countries participated in the tournament.

== History ==
In February 2024, the president of the Sepaktakraw Association of Malaysia, Mohd Sumali Reduan, informed that 21 countries confirmed to join the tournament, 12 of which, namely Malaysia, Thailand, South Korea, Myanmar, Vietnam, India, Indonesia, Singapore, Brunei, Japan, China, and the Philippines, was categorized for the Premier Division (PM), while the remaining 9 countries, including Sri Lanka, Saudi Arabia, France, Iran, Taiwan, Nepal, Pakistan, Germany, and Bangladesh, will compete in the Division 1 league (D1).

The open ceremony and the draw happened on March 6, 2024, at the Tun Dr Ismail Hall in the World Trade Centre Kuala Lumpur. Team event for the Division 1 league (MT-D1) and female category were excluded in this edition. A new world ranking calculation system, invented by the International Sepaktakraw Federation (ISTAF) to determine countries qualified for the international multi-sport events, was introduced in the tournament.

== Participating countries ==
Premier Division (PM)
Group	Double event (MD)	Regu event (MR)	Team event (MT)
Group A	Japan; Brunei; Malaysia	Thailand; Vietnam; Indonesia	Indonesia; Vietnam; Singapore
Group B	China; Vietnam; India	Malaysia; China; Brunei	India; Thailand; China
Group C	Myanmar; Philippines; Indonesia	South Korea; Philippines; Singapore	Brunei; Japan; Malaysia
Group D	Thailand; Singapore; South Korea	India; Japan; Myanmar	Myanmar; Philippines; South Korea

Division 1 (D1)
Group	Double event (MD)	Regu event (MR)
Group A	Bangladesh; Nepal; Chinese Taipei; Sri Lanka	Germany; France; Nepal; Iran
Group B	Saudi Arabia; France; Iran; Germany; Pakistan	Bangladesh; Pakistan; Sri Lanka; Chinese Taipei; Saudi Arabia

== Group stage ==
=== Premier division: Double event ===
==== Group A ====
Pos	Team	Pld	W	L	Pts	SW	SL	SR	SPW	SPL	SPR	Qualification
1	Malaysia (H, Q)	2	2	0	6	4	0	MAX	60	32	1.875	Final round
2	Japan (Q)	2	1	1	3	2	2	1.000	42	53	0.792	Final round
3	Brunei (E)	2	0	2	0	0	4	0.000	43	60	0.717	

(E) Eliminated; (H) Host; (Q) Qualified for the phase indicated

18 May; 12:00	Japan	2–0	Brunei	Titiwangsa Stadium, Court 2
18 May; 12:00	15–13, 15–10			Titiwangsa Stadium, Court 2

19 May; 18:30	Malaysia	2–0	Japan	Titiwangsa Stadium, Court 1
19 May; 18:30	15–9, 15–3			Titiwangsa Stadium, Court 1

20 May; 21:30	Malaysia	2–0	Brunei	Titiwangsa Stadium, Court 1
20 May; 21:30	15–9, 15–11			Titiwangsa Stadium, Court 1

==== Group B ====
Pos	Team	Pld	W	L	Pts	SW	SL	SR	SPW	SPL	SPR	Qualification
1	Vietnam (Q)	2	2	0	6	4	2	2.000	94	86	1.093	Final round
2	India (Q)	2	1	1	3	3	3	1.000	85	85	1.000	Final round
3	China (E)	2	0	2	0	2	4	0.500	74	82	0.902	

(E) Eliminated; (Q) Qualified for the phase indicated

18 May; 12:00	Vietnam	2–1	China	Titiwangsa Stadium, Court 2
18 May; 12:00	15–17, 15–13, 15–8			Titiwangsa Stadium, Court 2

19 May; 14:00	India	2–1	China	Titiwangsa Stadium, Court 1
19 May; 14:00	7–15, 15–8, 15–13			Titiwangsa Stadium, Court 1

20 May; 20:00	Vietnam	2–1	India	Titiwangsa Stadium, Court 1
20 May; 20:00	17–16, 15–17, 17–15			Titiwangsa Stadium, Court 1

==== Group C ====
Pos	Team	Pld	W	L	Pts	SW	SL	SR	SPW	SPL	SPR	Qualification
1	Myanmar (Q)	2	2	0	6	4	2	2.000	92	70	1.314	Final round
2	Indonesia (Q)	2	1	1	3	3	3	1.000	77	84	0.917	Final round
3	Philippines (E)	2	0	2	0	2	4	0.500	70	85	0.824	

(E) Eliminated; (Q) Qualified for the phase indicated

18 May; 15:30	Myanmar	2–1	Philippines	Titiwangsa Stadium, Court 1
18 May; 15:30	15–9, 16–17, 15–6			Titiwangsa Stadium, Court 1

19 May; 14:00	Indonesia	1–2	Myanmar	Titiwangsa Stadium, Court 2
19 May; 14:00	9–15, 17–16, 12–15			Titiwangsa Stadium, Court 2

20 May; 14:00	Indonesia	2–1	Philippines	Titiwangsa Stadium, Court 1
20 May; 14:00	7–15, 15–7, 17–16			Titiwangsa Stadium, Court 1

==== Group D ====
Pos	Team	Pld	W	L	Pts	SW	SL	SR	SPW	SPL	SPR	Qualification
1	Thailand (Q)	2	2	0	6	4	0	MAX	62	42	1.476	Final round
2	South Korea (Q)	2	1	1	3	2	2	1.000	46	52	0.885	Final round
3	Singapore (E)	2	0	2	0	0	4	0.000	49	62	0.790	

(E) Eliminated; (Q) Qualified for the phase indicated

18 May; 14:00	Thailand	2–0	Singapore	Titiwangsa Stadium, Court 1
18 May; 14:00	15–12, 17–15			Titiwangsa Stadium, Court 1

19 May; 17:00	Thailand	2–0	South Korea	Titiwangsa Stadium, Court 1
19 May; 17:00	15–10, 15–6			Titiwangsa Stadium, Court 1

20 May; 15:30	South Korea	2–0	Singapore	Titiwangsa Stadium, Court 1
20 May; 15:30	15–12, 15–10			Titiwangsa Stadium, Court 1

=== Premier division: Regu event ===
==== Group A ====
Pos	Team	Pld	W	L	Pts	SW	SL	SR	SPW	SPL	SPR	Qualification
1	Thailand (Q)	2	2	0	6	4	0	MAX	60	53	1.132	Final round
2	Indonesia (Q)	2	1	1	3	2	2	1.000	48	50	0.960	Final round
3	Vietnam (E)	2	0	2	0	0	4	0.000	35	60	0.583	

(E) Eliminated; (Q) Qualified for the phase indicated

18 May; 20:00	Thailand	2–0	Vietnam	Titiwangsa Stadium, Court 1
18 May; 20:00	15–7, 15–8			Titiwangsa Stadium, Court 1

19 May; 21:30	Thailand	2–0	Indonesia	Titiwangsa Stadium, Court 1
19 May; 21:30	15–11, 15–7			Titiwangsa Stadium, Court 1

20 May; 17:00	Indonesia	2–0	Vietnam	Titiwangsa Stadium, Court 1
20 May; 17:00	15–9, 15–11			Titiwangsa Stadium, Court 1

==== Group B ====
Pos	Team	Pld	W	L	Pts	SW	SL	SR	SPW	SPL	SPR	Qualification
1	Malaysia (H, Q)	2	2	0	6	4	0	MAX	60	27	2.222	Final round
2	Brunei (Q)	2	1	1	3	2	2	1.000	44	50	0.880	Final round
3	China (E)	2	0	2	0	0	4	0.000	33	60	0.550	

(E) Eliminated; (H) Host; (Q) Qualified for the phase indicated

18 May; 21:30	Malaysia	2–0	China	Titiwangsa Stadium, Court 1
18 May; 21:30	15–6, 15–7			Titiwangsa Stadium, Court 1

19 May; 20:00	Malaysia	2–0	Brunei	Titiwangsa Stadium, Court 1
19 May; 20:00	15–7, 15–7			Titiwangsa Stadium, Court 1

20 May; 17:00	Brunei	2–0	China	Titiwangsa Stadium, Court 2
20 May; 17:00	15–11, 15–9			Titiwangsa Stadium, Court 2

==== Group C ====
Pos	Team	Pld	W	L	Pts	SW	SL	SR	SPW	SPL	SPR	Qualification
1	Philippines (Q)	2	1	1	3	3	3	1.000	77	75	1.027	Final round
2	Singapore (Q)	2	1	1	3	3	3	1.000	77	77	1.000	Final round
3	South Korea (E)	2	1	1	3	3	3	1.000	76	78	0.974	

(E) Eliminated; (Q) Qualified for the phase indicated

18 May; 18:30	Philippines	1–2	South Korea	Titiwangsa Stadium, Court 1
18 May; 18:30	12–15, 15–8, 11–15			Titiwangsa Stadium, Court 1

19 May; 15:30	Singapore	2–1	South Korea	Titiwangsa Stadium, Court 1
19 May; 15:30	10–15, 15–11, 15–12			Titiwangsa Stadium, Court 1

20 May; 18:30	Philippines	2–1	Singapore	Titiwangsa Stadium, Court 1
20 May; 18:30	9–15, 15–9, 15–13			Titiwangsa Stadium, Court 1

==== Group D ====
Pos	Team	Pld	W	L	Pts	SW	SL	SR	SPW	SPL	SPR	Qualification
1	Myanmar (Q)	2	2	0	6	4	0	MAX	72	59	1.220	Final round
2	India (Q)	2	1	1	3	3	2	1.500	71	59	1.203	Final round
3	Japan (E)	2	0	2	0	0	4	0.000	35	60	0.583	

(E) Eliminated; (Q) Qualified for the phase indicated

18 May; 17:00	India	2–0	Japan	Titiwangsa Stadium, Court 1
18 May; 17:00	15–10, 15–7			Titiwangsa Stadium, Court 1

19 May; 20:00	Myanmar	2–1	India	Titiwangsa Stadium, Court 2
19 May; 20:00	15–13, 12–15, 15–13			Titiwangsa Stadium, Court 2

20 May; 18:30	Myanmar	2–0	Japan	Titiwangsa Stadium, Court 1
20 May; 18:30	15–12, 15–6			Titiwangsa Stadium, Court 1

=== Premier division: Team Regu event ===
==== Group A ====
Pos	Team	Pld	W	L	Pts	SW	SL	SR	SPW	SPL	SPR	Qualification
1	Indonesia (Q)	2	2	0	6	10	3	3.333	189	143	1.322	Final round
2	Vietnam (Q)	2	1	1	3	7	7	1.000	190	182	1.044	Final round
3	Singapore (E)	2	0	2	0	3	10	0.300	137	191	0.717	

(E) Eliminated; (Q) Qualified for the phase indicated

23 May; 09:00	Indonesia	2–1	Vietnam	Titiwangsa Stadium, Court 1
23 May; 09:00	10–15, 15–8, 17–16; 15–9, 15–10; 12–15, 15–17			Titiwangsa Stadium, Court 1

23 May; 20:00	Indonesia	3–0	Singapore	Titiwangsa Stadium, Court 1
23 May; 20:00	15–7, 15–9; 15–9, 15–8; 15–11, 15–10			Titiwangsa Stadium, Court 1

24 May; 15:00	Vietnam	2–1	Singapore	Titiwangsa Stadium, Court 1
24 May; 15:00	13–15, 15–17; 15–9, 13–15, 15–12; 15–11, 15–7			Titiwangsa Stadium, Court 1

==== Group B ====
Pos	Team	Pld	W	L	Pts	SW	SL	SR	SPW	SPL	SPR	Qualification
1	Thailand (Q)	2	2	0	6	12	0	MAX	180	54	3.333	Final round
2	India (Q)	2	1	1	3	6	7	0.857	134	157	0.854	Final round
3	China (E)	2	0	2	0	1	12	0.083	97	200	0.485	

(E) Eliminated; (Q) Qualified for the phase indicated

23 May; 09:00	Thailand	3–0	India	Titiwangsa Stadium, Court 2
23 May; 09:00	15–3, 15–3; 15–7, 15–4; 15–6, 15–2			Titiwangsa Stadium, Court 2

23 May; 20:00	India	3–0	China	Titiwangsa Stadium, Court 2
23 May; 20:00	15–6, 15–4; 15–4, 15–7; 17–15, 16–17, 17–14			Titiwangsa Stadium, Court 2

24 May; 15:00	Thailand	3–0	China	Titiwangsa Stadium, Court 2
24 May; 15:00	15–5, 15–9; 15–3, 15–3; 15–5, 15–5			Titiwangsa Stadium, Court 2

==== Group C ====
Pos	Team	Pld	W	L	Pts	SW	SL	SR	SPW	SPL	SPR	Qualification
1	Malaysia (H, Q)	2	2	0	6	6	0	MAX	90	45	2.000	Final round
2	Japan (Q)	2	1	1	3	4	3	1.333	99	84	1.179	Final round
3	Brunei (E)	2	0	2	0	3	10	0.300	129	189	0.683	

(E) Eliminated; (H) Host; (Q) Qualified for the phase indicated

23 May; 15:00	Malaysia	3–0	Brunei	Titiwangsa Stadium, Court 1
23 May; 15:00	15–11, 15–7; 15–7, 15–9; 15–6, 15–5			Titiwangsa Stadium, Court 1

24 May; 09:00	Brunei	1–2	Japan	Titiwangsa Stadium, Court 1
24 May; 09:00	8–15, 16–17; 15–7, 17–16; 17–14, 3–15, 8–15			Titiwangsa Stadium, Court 1

24 May; 20:00	Malaysia	3–0	Japan	Titiwangsa Stadium, Court 1
24 May; 20:00	15–13, 15–4; 15–5, 15–5; 15–5, 15–7			Titiwangsa Stadium, Court 1

==== Group D ====
Pos	Team	Pld	W	L	Pts	SW	SL	SR	SPW	SPL	SPR	Qualification
1	South Korea (Q)	2	2	0	6	11	3	3.667	195	150	1.300	Final round
2	Myanmar (Q)	2	1	1	3	9	7	1.286	216	199	1.085	Final round
3	Philippines (E)	2	0	2	0	2	12	0.167	142	204	0.696	

(E) Eliminated; (Q) Qualified for the phase indicated

23 May; 15:00	Myanmar	3–0	Philippines	Titiwangsa Stadium, Court 2
23 May; 15:00	15–11, 15–10; 9–15, 15–8, 15–8; 15–12, 13–15, 17–15			Titiwangsa Stadium, Court 2

24 May; 09:00	Myanmar	1–2	South Korea	Titiwangsa Stadium, Court 2
24 May; 09:00	11–15, 8–15; 11–15, 15–8, 15–9; 15–11, 16–17, 11–15			Titiwangsa Stadium, Court 2

24 May; 20:00	Philippines	0–3	South Korea	Titiwangsa Stadium, Court 2
24 May; 20:00	11–15, 11–15; 4–15, 6–15; 8–15, 8–15			Titiwangsa Stadium, Court 2

=== Division 1: Double event ===
==== Group A ====
Pos	Team	Pld	W	L	Pts	SW	SL	SR	SPW	SPL	SPR	Qualification
1	Chinese Taipei (Q)	3	3	0	9	6	1	6.000	105	81	1.296	Final round
2	Nepal (Q)	3	2	1	6	4	3	1.333	97	90	1.078	Final round
3	Bangladesh (E)	3	1	2	3	3	4	0.750	85	95	0.895	
4	Sri Lanka (E)	3	0	3	0	1	6	0.167	68	105	0.648	

(E) Eliminated; (Q) Qualified for the phase indicated

18 May; 14:00	Bangladesh	2–0	Sri Lanka	Titiwangsa Stadium, Court 2
18 May; 14:00	15–9, 15–13			Titiwangsa Stadium, Court 2

18 May; 15:30	Chinese Taipei	2–0	Nepal	Titiwangsa Stadium, Court 2
18 May; 15:30	15–12, 15–12			Titiwangsa Stadium, Court 2

19 May; 10:30	Nepal	2–0	Sri Lanka	Titiwangsa Stadium, Court 2
19 May; 10:30	15–6, 15–6			Titiwangsa Stadium, Court 2

19 May; 10:30	Chinese Taipei	2–0	Bangladesh	Titiwangsa Stadium, Court 1
19 May; 10:30	15–12, 15–11			Titiwangsa Stadium, Court 1

20 May; 09:00	Nepal	2–1	Bangladesh	Titiwangsa Stadium, Court 1
20 May; 09:00	15–10, 13–15, 15–7			Titiwangsa Stadium, Court 1

20 May; 09:00	Chinese Taipei	2–1	Sri Lanka	Titiwangsa Stadium, Court 2
20 May; 09:00	15–17, 15–8, 15–9			Titiwangsa Stadium, Court 2

==== Group B ====
Pos	Team	Pld	W	L	Pts	SW	SL	SR	SPW	SPL	SPR	Qualification
1	Iran (Q)	4	4	0	12	8	1	8.000	130	78	1.667	Final round
2	Germany (Q)	4	3	1	9	6	1	6.000	120	108	1.111	Final round
3	Saudi Arabia (E)	4	2	2	6	4	4	1.000	50	89	0.562	
4	France (E)	4	1	3	3	4	6	0.667	96	112	0.857	
5	Pakistan (E)	4	0	4	0	0	8	0.000	68	122	0.557	

(E) Eliminated; (Q) Qualified for the phase indicated

18 May; 17:00	Germany	2–0	Saudi Arabia	Titiwangsa Stadium, Court 2
18 May; 17:00	15–10, 17–16			Titiwangsa Stadium, Court 2

18 May; 18:30	Iran	2–1	France	Titiwangsa Stadium, Court 2
18 May; 18:30	15–6, 10–15, 15–11			Titiwangsa Stadium, Court 2

19 May; 12:00	Iran	2–0	Pakistan	Titiwangsa Stadium, Court 1
19 May; 12:00	15–5, 15–6			Titiwangsa Stadium, Court 1

19 May; 12:00	France	0–2	Saudi Arabia	Titiwangsa Stadium, Court 2
19 May; 12:00	7–15, 12–15			Titiwangsa Stadium, Court 2

20 May; 10:30	Saudi Arabia	2–0	Pakistan	Titiwangsa Stadium, Court 1
20 May; 10:30	15–1, 15–7			Titiwangsa Stadium, Court 1

20 May; 10:30	Germany	2–1	France	Titiwangsa Stadium, Court 2
20 May; 10:30	10–15, 15–10, 15–9			Titiwangsa Stadium, Court 2

20 May; 14:00	Germany	2–0	Pakistan	Titiwangsa Stadium, Court 2
20 May; 14:00	15–4, 17–14			Titiwangsa Stadium, Court 2

20 May; 15:30	Iran	2–0	Saudi Arabia	Titiwangsa Stadium, Court 2
20 May; 15:30	15–11, 15–8			Titiwangsa Stadium, Court 2

21 May; 09:00	France	2–0	Pakistan	Titiwangsa Stadium, Court 1
21 May; 09:00	15–6, 15–7			Titiwangsa Stadium, Court 1

21 May; 09:00	Iran	2–0	Germany	Titiwangsa Stadium, Court 2
21 May; 09:00	15–6, 15–10			Titiwangsa Stadium, Court 2

=== Division 1: Regu event ===
==== Group A ====
Pos	Team	Pld	W	L	Pts	SW	SL	SR	SPW	SPL	SPR	Qualification
1	Iran (Q)	3	3	0	9	6	0	MAX	90	43	2.093	Final round
2	Nepal (Q)	3	2	1	6	4	1	4.000	86	78	1.103	Final round
3	France (E)	3	1	2	3	3	4	0.750	71	90	0.789	
4	Germany (E)	3	0	3	0	0	6	0.000	54	90	0.600	

(E) Eliminated; (Q) Qualified for the phase indicated

18 May; 09:00	Iran	2–0	Germany	Titiwangsa Stadium, Court 1
18 May; 09:00	15–10, 15–3			Titiwangsa Stadium, Court 1

18 May; 09:00	France	1–2	Nepal	Titiwangsa Stadium, Court 2
18 May; 09:00	15–7, 7–15, 8–15			Titiwangsa Stadium, Court 2

19 May; 09:00	Iran	2–0	France	Titiwangsa Stadium, Court 1
19 May; 09:00	15–3, 15–8			Titiwangsa Stadium, Court 1

19 May; 09:00	Germany	0–2	Nepal	Titiwangsa Stadium, Court 2
19 May; 09:00	8–15, 10–15			Titiwangsa Stadium, Court 2

19 May; 18:30	Germany	0–2	France	Titiwangsa Stadium, Court 1
19 May; 18:30	10–15, 13–15			Titiwangsa Stadium, Court 1

20 May; 21:30	Iran	2–0	Nepal	Titiwangsa Stadium, Court 2
20 May; 21:30	15–6, 15–13			Titiwangsa Stadium, Court 2

==== Group B ====
Pos	Team	Pld	W	L	Pts	SW	SL	SR	SPW	SPL	SPR	Qualification
1	Chinese Taipei (Q)	4	4	0	12	8	0	MAX	120	53	2.264	Final round
2	Bangladesh (Q)	4	3	1	9	6	3	2.000	114	102	1.118	Final round
3	Sri Lanka (E)	4	2	2	6	4	4	1.000	94	102	0.922	
4	Saudi Arabia (E)	4	1	3	3	3	6	0.500	101	115	0.878	
5	Pakistan (E)	4	0	4	0	0	8	0.000	63	120	0.525	

(E) Eliminated; (Q) Qualified for the phase indicated

18 May; 10:30	Chinese Taipei	2–0	Bangladesh	Titiwangsa Stadium, Court 1
18 May; 10:30	15–7, 15–5			Titiwangsa Stadium, Court 1

18 May; 10:30	Sri Lanka	2–0	Pakistan	Titiwangsa Stadium, Court 2
18 May; 10:30	15–11, 15–5			Titiwangsa Stadium, Court 2

18 May; 20:00	Bangladesh	2–0	Pakistan	Titiwangsa Stadium, Court 2
18 May; 20:00	15–12, 15–8			Titiwangsa Stadium, Court 2

18 May; 21:30	Sri Lanka	2–0	Saudi Arabia	Titiwangsa Stadium, Court 2
18 May; 21:30	15–13, 15–11			Titiwangsa Stadium, Court 2

19 May; 15:30	Bangladesh	2–1	Saudi Arabia	Titiwangsa Stadium, Court 2
19 May; 15:30	10–15, 15–10, 15–3			Titiwangsa Stadium, Court 2

19 May; 17:00	Chinese Taipei	2–0	Pakistan	Titiwangsa Stadium, Court 2
19 May; 17:00	15–9, 15–3			Titiwangsa Stadium, Court 2

20 May; 12:00	Bangladesh	2–0	Sri Lanka	Titiwangsa Stadium, Court 1
20 May; 12:00	17–14, 15–10			Titiwangsa Stadium, Court 1

20 May; 12:00	Chinese Taipei	2–0	Saudi Arabia	Titiwangsa Stadium, Court 2
20 May; 12:00	15–9, 15–10			Titiwangsa Stadium, Court 2

20 May; 21:30	Chinese Taipei	2–0	Sri Lanka	Titiwangsa Stadium, Court 2
20 May; 21:30	15–4, 15–6			Titiwangsa Stadium, Court 2

20 May; 15:30	Saudi Arabia	2–0	Pakistan	Titiwangsa Stadium, Court 2
20 May; 15:30	15–6, 15–9			Titiwangsa Stadium, Court 2

== Finals ==
=== Premier division: Double event ===
==== Final round ====
Quarter-finals
1A	Malaysia	15	15	15	2
2D	South Korea	11	17	8	1
Date: May 21, 10:30–12:00
1C	Myanmar	15	15	2
2B	India	8	13	0
1B	Vietnam	9	17	0
2C	Indonesia	15	15	2
Date: May 21, 10:30–12:00
2A	Japan	10	11	0
1D	Thailand	15	15	2

Semi-finals
1A	Malaysia	15	17	2
1C	Myanmar	10	16	0
2C	Indonesia	8	13	0
1D	Thailand	15	15	2

Finals
1A	Malaysia	17	15	2
1D	Thailand	16	13	0

Winner
Men's Double Premier Division
2024 ISTAF World Cup
(Malaysia)
Malaysia
First title

=== Premier division: Regu event ===
==== Final round ====
Quarter-finals
1A	Thailand	15	15	2
2D	India	7	10	0
Date: May 21, 14:00–15:30
1C	Philippines	17	9	15	2
2B	Brunei	16	15	2	1
1B	Malaysia	15	15	2
2C	Singapore	7	9	0
Date: May 21, 14:00–15:30
2A	Indonesia	13	16	0
1D	Myanmar	15	17	2

Semi-finals
1A	Thailand	15	15	2
1C	Philippines	4	8	0
1B	Malaysia	15	15	2
1D	Myanmar	3	11	0

Finals
1A	Thailand	8	12	0
1B	Malaysia	15	15	2

Winner
Men's Regu Premier Division
2024 ISTAF World Cup
(Malaysia)
Malaysia
First title

=== Premier division: Team Regu event ===
==== Final round ====
Quarter-finals
1A	Indonesia	2
2D	Myanmar	0
Date: May 25
1C	Malaysia	2
2B	India	0
1B	Thailand	2
2C	Japan	0
Date: May 25
2A	Vietnam	1
1D	South Korea	2

Semi-finals
1A	Indonesia	0
1C	Malaysia	2
1B	Thailand	2
1D	South Korea	0

Finals
1C	Malaysia	1
1B	Thailand	2

Winner
Men's Team Regu Premier Division
2024 ISTAF World Cup
(Thailand)
Thailand
Third title

25 May; 09:00	Indonesia	2–0	Myanmar	Titiwangsa Stadium, Court 1
25 May; 09:00	15–10, 15–4; 17–15, 15–6 –, –			Titiwangsa Stadium, Court 1

25 May; 09:00	Thailand	2–0	Japan	Titiwangsa Stadium, Court 2
25 May; 09:00	15–3, 15–10; 15–7, 15–8 –, –			Titiwangsa Stadium, Court 2

25 May; 12:00	Malaysia	2–0	India	Titiwangsa Stadium, Court 1
25 May; 12:00	15–3, 15–11; 15–5, 15–12 –, –			Titiwangsa Stadium, Court 1

25 May; 12:00	Vietnam	1–2	South Korea	Titiwangsa Stadium, Court 2
25 May; 12:00	10–15, 9–15; 15–12, 15–9; 11–15, 6–15			Titiwangsa Stadium, Court 2

25 May; 20:00	Malaysia	2–0	Indonesia	Titiwangsa Stadium, Court 1
25 May; 20:00	15–12, 15–9; 15–8, 15–7 –, –			Titiwangsa Stadium, Court 1

25 May; 20:00	Thailand	2–0	South Korea	Titiwangsa Stadium, Court 2
25 May; 20:00	15–8, 15–9; 15–5, 15–10 –, –			Titiwangsa Stadium, Court 2

26 May; 15:00	Malaysia	1–2	Thailand	Titiwangsa Stadium, Court 1
26 May; 15:00	9–15, 15–11, 15–13; 8–15, 5–15; 12–15, 12–15			Titiwangsa Stadium, Court 1

=== Division 1: Double event ===
==== Final round ====
Semi-finals
1A	Chinese Taipei	10	17	15	2
2B	Germany	15	14	12	1
Date: May 21, 18:30
2A	Nepal	13	11	0
1B	Iran	15	15	2

Final
1A	Chinese Taipei	15	12	11	1
1B	Iran	11	15	15	2

Winner
Men's Double Division 1
2024 ISTAF World Cup
(Iran)
Iran
First title

=== Division 1: Regu event ===
==== Final round ====
Semi-finals
1A	Iran	15	15	2
2B	Bangladesh	6	7	0
Date: May 21, 18:30
2A	Nepal	11	15	12	1
1B	Chinese Taipei	15	10	15	2

Final
1A	Iran	15	15	2
1B	Chinese Taipei	9	10	0

Winner
Men's Regu Division 1
2024 ISTAF World Cup
(Iran)
Iran
First title
