= Philippine National Volleyball Federation =

Sports governing body

- Sport: Volleyball
- Abbreviation: PNVF
- Founded: 2021
- Affiliation: FIVB
- Affiliation date: 2021
- Regional affiliation: AVC
- Affiliation date: 2021
- President: Frank Lao
- Vice president: Donn Kapunan
- Secretary: Donaldo Caringal
- Replaced: Larong Volleyball sa Pilipinas
- (founded): 2015

Official website
- volleyballphilippines.com
- (Philippines)

The Philippine National Volleyball Federation Inc. (PNVF), also known as Volleyball Philippines, is the national sport association for volleyball in the Philippines. It is recognized by the Philippine Olympic Committee (POC), the Asian Volleyball Confederation (AVC) and the Fédération Internationale de Volleyball (FIVB). The PNVF has been suspended by the FIVB as of May 29, 2026.

== History ==
=== PVF–LVPI dispute ===
Prior to the formation of the Philippine National Volleyball Federation (PNVF), the Philippine Volleyball Federation (PVF) was recognized by the Philippine Olympic Committee (POC) as the national sports association for volleyball in the Philippines. The PVF lost POC recognition in 2014 following a leadership crisis after PVF Vice-president Karl Chan assumed the presidency after PVF President Gener Dungo filed an indefinite leave of absence. Dungo was alleged to have mismanaged the PVF's funds.

The Fédération Internationale de Volleyball (FIVB) in January 2015, gave provisional membership to a new volleyball federation, the Larong Volleyball sa Pilipinas, Inc. (LVPI) The PVF was suspended but remained affiliated with the FIVB, although it has lost all its rights associated with membership. The provisional status has allowed the LVPI to organize and send national teams to FIVB-sanctioned events for the next few years a privilege which was previously reserved to the PVF. Although the PVF continues to claim that it is the legitimate national sports association for volleyball in the Philippines. The LVPI on their part has lobbied to be granted full FIVB-membership and the full expulsion of PVF from the international volleyball body.

=== Formation ===
The FIVB announced in January 2020, that it would send a delegation to end the PVF-LVPI dispute. The Philippine Olympic Committee (POC) then scheduled an election to determine the officials of a new national sports association for volleyball prior to the 2021 FIVB World Congress in a bid to end the dispute. The POC reportedly had talks that the contested positions to be divided among the LVPI, PVF, a third group called the Alliances of Philippine Volleyball Inc. (APVI), and itself. PVF President Edgardo Cantada rejected the POC's proposal Although several PVF officials defied Cantada's stance and expressed interest to join the elections.

In 2021, the PNVF was formed with its first set of officials elected on January 25, 2021, in an interim basis. Ramon Suzara of AVPI was elected as the PNVF's president unopposed with Ricky Palou withdrawing his presidential bid.

The PNVF was given provisional membership in the POC on January 27, 2021, with a Securities and Exchange Commission registration needed to be given full membership in the POC.

In February 2021, PNVF received official recognition from FIVB as the national governing body in the Philippines as the PVF was expelled. It announced plans to launch the league in July 2021. It also received recognition from the Asian Volleyball Confederation, Asia's governing body.

=== Operations ===
The PNVF planned to organize its own domestic league separate from the two existing commercial leagues, the Premier Volleyball League and the Philippine Super Liga. The PNVF Champions League was organized.

After being delayed twice, an election was held on November 21, 2025 with Tonyboy Liao becoming new president replacing Suzara. There was a failed attempt to bare Liao and Ricky Palou to vote and Suzara failed to get elected to any of the 13 available position for conttention. President-elect Liao's tenure began on January 1, 2026.

=== Suspension ===
On May 29, 2026, the Philippine government withdrew support over the PNVF. The Philippine Sports Commission (PSC) froze funding of the PNVF over multiple issues including the "apparent absence of legitimate national team participation" at the 2026 AVC Women's Volleyball Cup. The core of the Philippine women's national team has been affected by mass withdrawal with a new roster led by Alyssa Valdez named to the squad. The PSC also raised concerns over the lack of coordination between the PNVF, and the AVC, and alleged marketing contractual breaches in the 2026 Volleyball World Beach Pro Tour.

That same day, the FIVB suspended the PNVF with immediate effect over governance concerns and multiple violations of the FIVB Code of Ethics. The FIVB appointed an ad hoc committee to oversee the PNVF's current operations, prioritize the athletes' participation in international competitions and to ensure successful hosting of the upcoming Women's Volleyball Nations League stop in the Philippines. The POC is expected to follow suit and suspend the PNVF in its upcoming general assembly in June 2026.

In June 2026, as expected, the POC formally suspended the PNVF following the FIVB's ruling. This means that the PNVF cannot attend all-POC related activities, all past and future PNVF elections will remain unrecognised and all Alas Pilipinas teams will be placed under the POC's supervision ahead of the 2026 Asian Games.

FIVB later announced that the ad hoc committee set out a roadmap co-ordinated with the POC, PSC, PVL and with national team athletes and coaches for PNVF's return from suspension and to ensure sustainable development. This roadmap aims to address the PNVF's governance, operational and development-related matters which led to its suspension.

The FIVB and POC will form a Transition Committee to ensure alignment of operations during its suspension and will work with all relevant stakeholders to monitor progress and for PNVF's return to be based on clear compliance, reform and full commitment to long-term development to volleyball in the Philippines.

Officials of the PNVF resigned on July 27, 2026 heading to the instructions of the POC. A 13-member PNVF Board was formed with elections held on August 10, 2026. Frank Lao was elected president, ending the POC's caretaker role.

== Officials ==
=== Presidents ===
- Ramon Suzara (2021–2025)
- Tonyboy Liao (2026–?)
- Frank Lao (June 2026; nullified; August 2026–present)
