= Edwin Gastanes =

Filipino lawyer and sports administrator (1958–2024)

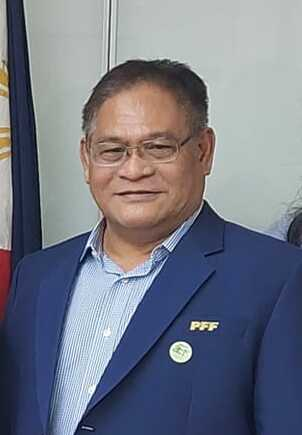
- Gastanes in 2023
- Born: December 21, 1958
- Died: December 24, 2024 (aged 66)
- Occupations: Lawyer, General Secretary of the Philippine Football Federation and the Secretary General of the Philippine Olympic Committee

Edwin B. Gastanes (December 21, 1958 – December 24, 2024) was a Filipino lawyer and sports administrator who was general secretary of the Philippine Olympic Committee from 2019 to 2023. He was also the secretary general of the Philippine Football Federation from 2013 to 2023.

== Early life and education ==
Gastanes was born on December 21, 1958. He attended the Manuel L. Quezon University where he took his pre-law degree in 1981. He obtained his bachelor of laws degree from the University of the Philippines College of Law in 1986 and passed the bar examination the following year.

== Sports administration ==
=== Philippine Football Federation ===
Gastanes was appointed general secretary of the Philippine Football Federation (PFF) on February 15, 2013. He was tapped by PFF President Mariano Araneta to help manage the sports body. He resigned on September 30, 2023.

=== Philippine Olympic Committee ===
Gastanes was named secretary general of the Philippine Olympic Committee on August 8, 2019. His resignation from the PFF in 2023, automatically made him ineligible to continue serving his position as POC general secretary. He was succeeded by Wharton Chan.

=== AFC and AFF ===
Gastanes was initially appointed the Member of the AFC Legal Committee for the term 2013 until 2015. Then he was appointed the chairman of the ad-hoc AFC Electoral Committee during the 26th AFC Congress held in Manama, Bahrain. He went on to become the Deputy Chairperson of the AFC Legal Committee for the term 2015 to 2019, and he sat as Member of the AFC Legal Committee for the term 2019 until 2023. He also served as Alternate Council Member of the AESAN Football Federation for the term 2019 to 2023.

== Legal career ==
Gastanes worked for the law firm Ponce Enrile Reyes & Manalastas Law Offices (PECABAR).

== Political career ==
Hailing from the province of Palawan, Gastanes made two unsuccessful attempts to get elected as a representative of the province's 2nd district in the House of Representatives, in 2004 and 2022. His platform included a focus on agriculture and strict regulations of the local mining industry.

== Personal life and death ==
Married to Milagros Gastanes, the couple had two children. Edwin Gastanes died on December 24, 2024, at the age of 66.
