= Tats Suzara =

Filipino sports executive (born 1959)

Ramon Suzara
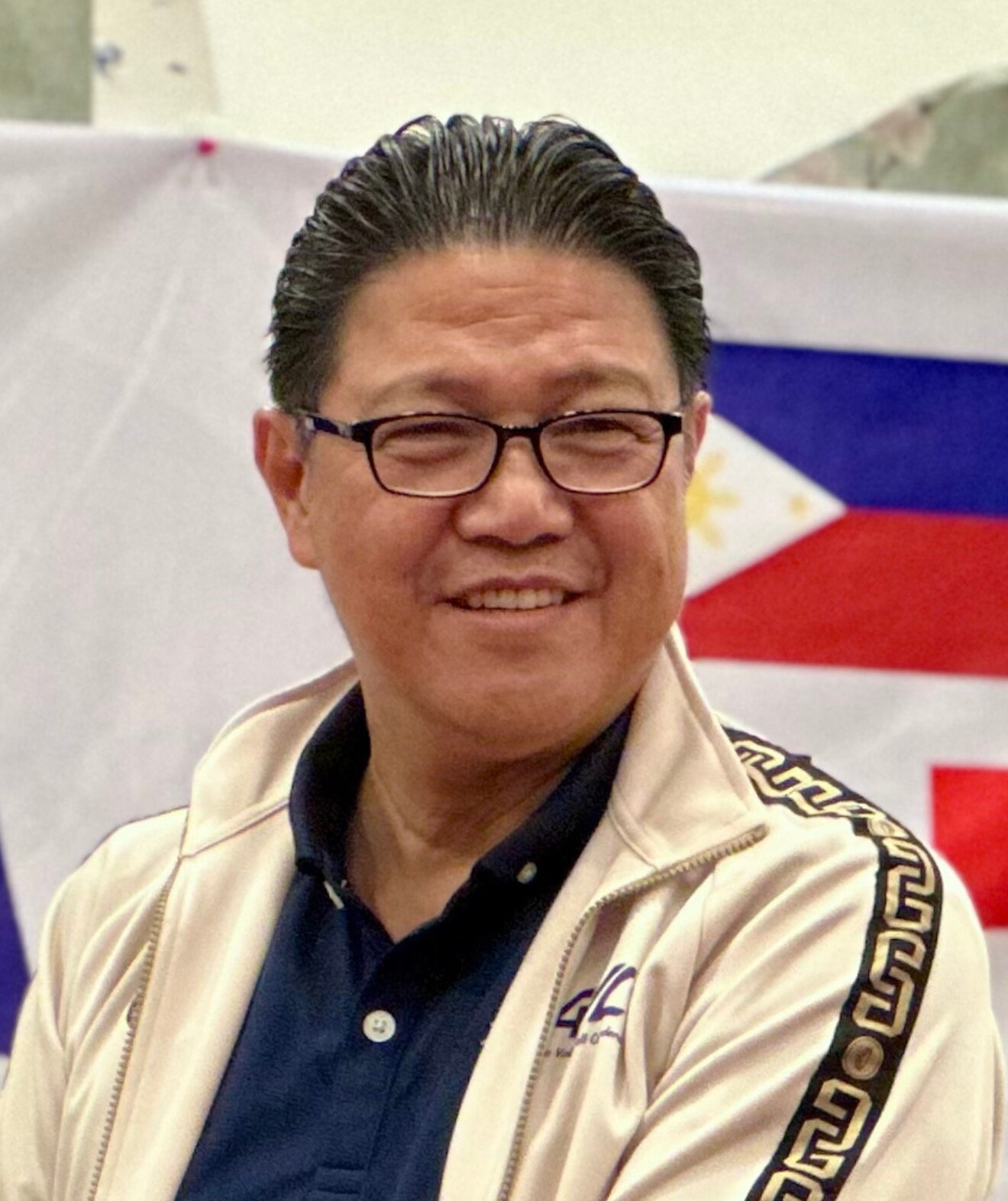
- Suzara in 2025
- Born: August 31, 1959 (age 66)
- Other name: Tats
- Occupation: Sports executive

Ramon Tatum Suzara (born August 31, 1959), also known as Tats Suzara, is a Filipino sports executive who serves as the president of the Asian Volleyball Confederation (AVC) and was president of the Philippine National Volleyball Federation (PNVF) from 2021 to 2025.

== Career ==
Suzara was secretary general of the Philippine Amateur Volleyball Association (PAVA) in the 1980s.

In January 2023, Suzara would be named as president of the Philippine National Volleyball Federation (PNVF). He would be recreated in January 2023.

He was the founding member of the Philippine Super Liga (PSL) which was established in 2013. He served as PSL president until May 2018 when he resigned after he was alleged to have committed qualified theft.

Suzara was elected to a four-year term as president of the Asian Volleyball Confederation (AVC) on August 30, 2024. He outbested Ali Ghanim Al-Kuwari of Qatar. Among his pledges are the creation of an AVC Champions' League, establishment of an athletes' commission, the creation of a new and permanent AVC headquarters in Bangkok.

He was PNVF president, when the Philippines hosted the 2025 FIVB Men's Volleyball World Championship. He was replaced by Tonyboy Liao after he lost in an election held on November 21, 2025. On August 10, 2026, he returned to the PNVF after he was elected as a member of the executive board.
