= Philippine Paddling Federation =

National sports body for the Philippines

Philippine Paddling Federation PPF
- IOC nation: Philippines
- Sport: Canoeing; Kayaking; Dragon boat

The Philippine Paddling Federation (PPF), formerly known as the Philippine Canoe Kayak Dragonboat Federation, Inc. (PCKDF) is the national governing body for the sports of Canoe, Kayak and Dragon boat in the Philippines.

It is accredited by the International Canoe Federation which is the governing body for the sport of Canoe in the world and by the Philippine Olympic Committee and the Philippine Sports Commission. Len Escollante is the current president of the PCKDF, and also serves as the head coach of the Philippines national dragon boat team.
