= Fencing in the Philippines =

Fencing in the Philippines is governed by the Philippine Fencing Association or PFA. Founded by Francisco Dayrit Sr., PFA is recognized by the Philippine Olympic Committee (POC) as one of its National Sports Association members and by the Federation Internationale d'Escrime (FIE), the international governing body for the sport. PFA is also a founding member of the Southeast Asian Fencing Federation (SEAFF) and the Asian Fencing Confederation (AFC). Richard Gomez is currently the president of PFA while Celso Dayrit is currently the president of the Fencing Confederation of Asia.

The sport was said to be introduced during the Spanish colonial era. Philippine revolution personalities such as Jose Rizal, Juan Luna and Antonio Luna were known to be fencers.
