= Celso Dayrit =

Filipino fencer (1951–2021)

President of the Fencing Confederation of Asia
- In office 2005–2021

8th President of the Philippine Olympic Committee
- In office 1999–2004
- Preceded by: Cristy Ramos
- Succeeded by: Peping Cojuangco

Personal details
- Born: December 11, 1951 Manila, Philippines
- Died: April 28, 2021 (aged 69)
- Relatives: Francisco Sr. (father)
- Sports career
- National team: Philippines
- Sport: Fencing
- Events: Epée. foil, sabre
- Coached by: Francisco Dayrit Sr.
Medal record
Representing the Philippines
Southeast Asian Games
Bronze medal – third place	1987 Jakarta

Celso "Cito" Limjuco Dayrit (December 11, 1951 – April 28, 2021) was a Filipino fencer and sports executive who served as President of the Philippine Olympic Committee and the Fencing Confederation of Asia.

== Early life and education ==
Celso Dayrit was born on December 11, 1951, in Manila, Philippines. He learned fencing at age six and was trained by his father, Francisco Dayrit Sr. He attended the De La Salle University, obtaining a bachelor's degree in business management in 1973 and later obtained a master's degree in business administration in 1978 at La Salle Business School.

== Career ==
=== Banking ===
Shortly after graduating from college Dayrit served managerial positions in the banking industry. He started his banking career in 1973, joining the Philippine Commercial & Industrial Bank. He also became Vice President of the BPI Credit Corporation, at the time credit cards were still being introduced in the Philippines.

=== Fencing career ===
Dayrit took up fencing as a competitive sport, partaking in various national and international competitions. He handled all three weapons in fencing; epée. foil, sabre. He represented the Philippines in international competitions from 1979 to 1988. At the 1987 Southeast Asian Games, he won a bronze medal. Dayrit was also given the Filipino Fencer of the Year Award for Epee in 1984.

=== As a sports executive ===
Celso Dayrit led the Philippine Fencing Association, the national sports association for fencing in the Philippines from 1997 to 2008. Simultaneously, he served as the President of the Philippine Olympic Committee (POC) from 1999 to 2004. In 2004, he made a bid for another term as POC President but withdrew his candidacy. Peping Cojuangco succeeded him.

He also became the President of the Fencing Confederation of Asia in 2005, leading the continental sports body until his death in 2021. He was serving his fifth term as president of the FCA at the time of his death.

The Philippine Sports Commission, the Philippine government's body for sports, had Dayrit as its commissioner from 1993 to 1998 during the tenure of President Fidel V. Ramos. Dayrit was largely involved in the founding of the Philippine National Games which was introduced in 1994.

Dayrit also has accreditation for being an International Course Director of the Olympic Solidarity Itinerant Administration School for sports leaders from the International Olympic Committee, being the only Filipino to have received the distinction.

He also founded the Philippine Olympic Academy and the Philippine Olympians Association.

He was part of the executive committee of the International Fencing Federation (FIE) from 2004 to 2020.

When the Philippines hosted the 2019 Southeast Asian Games, Dayrit was chairman of the Southeast Asian Games Federation. Although he resigned from the post in October 2019, less than two months prior to the opening of the games.

=== Publications ===
Dayrit published a book entitled The Olympic Movement in the Philippines in 2003; which could serve as a reference for national sports association officials.

== Honors and awards ==
The Olympic Council of Asia gave him an award in 2007. He is also a recipient of the Olympic Merit Award in the 2006 which was conferred on him by the Association of National Olympic Committees. In 1999, he became the first Filipino to serve as head of the SEA Games Federation Executive Committee. The International Fencing Federation (FIE) recognized him as a Member of Honour (MH) and he has been inducted to the FIE's Hall of Fame.

The Incheon University of South Korea has given him an honorary doctorate degree in 2007.

The Philippine Sportswriters Association conferred on Dayrit a leadership award two times and he is an inductee of the De La Salle Sports Hall of Fame.

== Death ==
Dayrit died on April 27, 2021, due to complications arising from COVID-19, amidst a pandemic of the disease.

== Personal life ==
Celso Dayrit comes from a family heavily involved in the sport of fencing with his father Francisco Sr. who founded the Philippine Amateur Fencers Association (now Philippine Fencing Association) in the 1930s and is known for being the "Father of Philippine Fencing".
