= Kevin McGrath (disambiguation) =

Kevin McGrath (born 1963), is a British financier

Kevin McGrath may also refer to:

- Kevin McGrath (wrestler) (born 1946), Australian Olympic wrestler
- Kevin McGrath, American CEO of eDiets and Digital Angel
- Kevin McGrath (hurler), see nephew Dónal O'Grady
- Kevin McGrath of Philippine Human Development Network
