= HDN =

HDN may refer to

== Medicine ==
- Hemolytic disease of the newborn, an alloimmune illness
- Hydronephrosis, hydrostatic dilation of the kidney

== Places ==
- Harlesden station, England, station code
- Yampa Valley Airport, Colorado, US, IATA code

== Other ==
- Hyperdimension Neptunia, a video game series
- Hydrodenitrogenation, an industrial chemical process
- Northern Haida language of North America, ISO 639-3 code
- Philippine Human Development Network
- Hdn., an abbreviation for the Greek grammarian Aelius Herodianus
