= Fidel V. Ramos =

President of the Philippines from 1992 to 1998

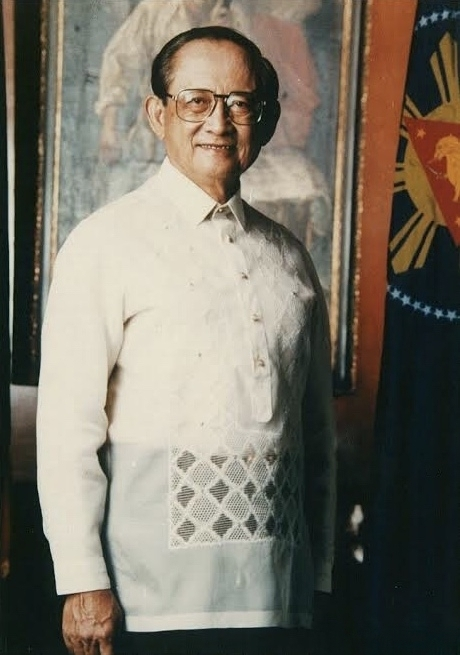
- Official portrait, 1995

12th President of the Philippines
- In office June 30, 1992 – June 30, 1998
- Vice President: Joseph Estrada
- Preceded by: Corazon Aquino
- Succeeded by: Joseph Estrada

17th Secretary of National Defense
- In office January 22, 1988 – July 18, 1991
- President: Corazon Aquino
- Preceded by: Rafael Ileto
- Succeeded by: Renato de Villa

19th Chief of Staff of the Armed Forces of the Philippines
- In office February 25, 1986 – January 21, 1988
- President: Corazon Aquino
- Preceded by: Fabian Ver
- Succeeded by: Renato de Villa
- In office October 24, 1984 – December 2, 1985; Acting
- President: Ferdinand Marcos
- Preceded by: Fabian Ver
- Succeeded by: Fabian Ver

Vice-Chief of Staff of the Armed Forces of the Philippines
- In office December 2, 1985 – February 25, 1986
- President: Ferdinand Marcos; Corazon Aquino
- Preceded by: Rafael Ileto
- Succeeded by: Salvador M. Mison

Chief of the Philippine Constabulary
- Director General of the Integrated National Police (1975–1986)
- In office 1972 – March 5, 1986
- President: Ferdinand Marcos; Corazon Aquino
- Preceded by: Eduardo M. Garcia
- Succeeded by: Renato de Villa

Personal details
- Born: Fidel Valdez Ramos; March 18, 1928 Lingayen, Pangasinan, Philippine Islands
- Died: July 31, 2022 (aged 94) Makati, Philippines
- Resting place: Libingan ng mga Bayani; Taguig, Philippines
- Party: Lakas (1991–2022)
- Other political affiliations: LDP (1991)
- Spouse: Amelita Martinez (m. 1954)
- Children: 5 (including Cristy)
- Education: United States Military Academy (BS); University of Illinois at Urbana-Champaign (MS); National Defense College of the Philippines (MNSA); Ateneo de Manila University (MBA)
- Occupation: Politician
- Profession: Soldier; civil engineer
- Website: Official website Foundation website Office of the President (archived)

Military service
- Allegiance: Philippines
- Branch/service: Philippine Constabulary; Philippine Army
- Years of service: 1950–1988
- Rank: General
- Commands: See list: Platoon Leader, 2nd Battalion Combat Team (BCT), Counter-Insurgency against the Communist Hukbalahap, 1951; Infantry Company Commander, 16th BCT, Counter-Insurgency against the Communist Hukbalahap, 1951; Platoon Leader, 20th BCT, Philippine Expeditionary Forces to Korea, United Nations Command (PEFTOK-UNC), Korean War, 1951–1952; Duty, Personnel Research Group, General Headquarters, Armed Forces of the Philippines, 1952–1954; Senior Aide de Camp to Chief of Staff, Armed Forces of the Philippines, 1958–1960; Associate Infantry Company Officer at Fort Bragg, North Carolina, 1960; Founder and Commanding Officer of the elite Special Forces of the Armed Forces of the Philippines, 1962–1965; Chief of Staff of the Philippine Military Contingent-Philippine Civil Action Group to Vietnam (AFP-PHILCAG), Vietnam War, 1965–1968; Presidential Assistant on Military Affairs, 1968–1969; Commander, 3rd Infantry Brigade Philippine Army, 1970; Chief of the Philippine Constabulary, 1970–1986; Command and General Staff of the Philippine Army, 1985; Acting Chief of Staff of the Armed Forces of the Philippines, 1984–1985; Vice Chief of Staff of the Armed Forces of the Philippines, 1985–1986; Military Reformist leader during the People Power Revolution, 1986; Chief of Staff of the Armed Forces of the Philippines, 1986–1988; Secretary of National Defense, 1988–1991; Commander in Chief of the Armed Forces of the Philippines, 1992–1998
- Battles/wars: Hukbalahap Rebellion; Korean War; Battle of Hill Eerie; Vietnam War; Moro conflict; Battle Of Marawi (1972)
- Awards: See list: Philippine Legion of Honor; Commander, Legion of Merit; Military Merit Medal; United Nations Service Medal; Vietnam Service Medal; Légion d'honneur; Distinguished Conduct Star (Philippines); United States Military Academy Distinguished Award; Korean Service Medal; Family Order of Laila Utama (Brunei); Commander, Order of Dharma Pratana (Indonesia); Grand Order of Mugunghwa; Collar, Order of Civil Merit; Honorary Knight Grand Cross, Order of Saint Michael and Saint George; Knight of the Collar, Order of Isabella the Catholic; Knight Grand Cordon, Order of the White Elephant; Order of Nishan-I-Pakistan; Collar, Order of Carlos III; Collar, Order of the Merit of Chile
- Fidel Ramos's voice Excerpt from his inaugural speech as president of the Philippines (Recorded on June 30, 1992)

Fidel Valdez Ramos CCLH GCS KGCR (Tagalog: [pɪˈdɛl bɐlˈdɛs ˈɾamos]; March 18, 1928 – July 31, 2022), popularly known as FVR and Eddie Ramos, was a Filipino general and politician who served as the 12th president of the Philippines from 1992 to 1998. He was the only career military officer to reach the rank of five-star general. Rising from second lieutenant to commander-in-chief of the armed forces, Ramos is credited for revitalizing and renewing international confidence in the Philippine economy during his six years in office.

Ramos rose through the ranks in the Philippine military early in his career and became Chief of the Philippine Constabulary and Vice Chief-of-Staff of the Armed Forces of the Philippines during the term of President Ferdinand Marcos. During the 1986 EDSA People Power Revolution, Ramos was hailed as a hero by many Filipinos for his decision to break away from the administration of Marcos, and pledge allegiance and loyalty to the newly established government of President Corazon C. Aquino. Prior to his election as president, Ramos served in the cabinet of President Aquino, first as chief-of-staff of the Armed Forces of the Philippines (AFP), and later as Secretary of National Defense from 1986 to 1991. He was credited with the creation of the Philippine Army's Special Forces and the Philippine National Police Special Action Force. After his retirement, he remained active in politics, serving as advisor to his successors.

Ramos died of COVID-19 Omicron variant at the Makati Medical Center in Makati on July 31, 2022, at the age of 94.

== Early life and education ==
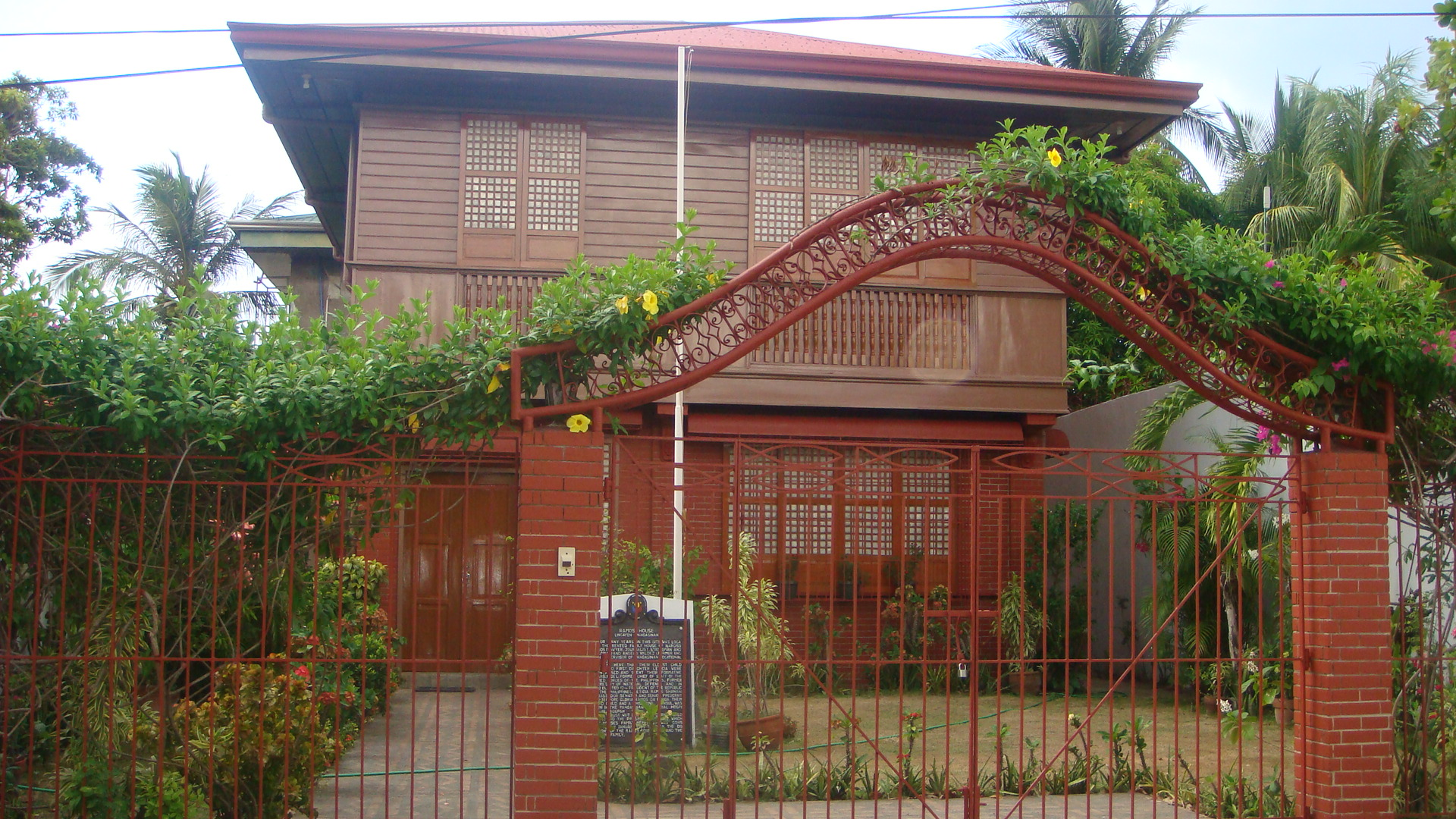
Rented family house of Narciso Ramos and Angela Valdez in Lingayen, where Fidel and Leticia Ramos-Shahani were born

Fidel Valdez Ramos was born on March 18, 1928, in Lingayen, Pangasinan, and grew up in Asingan during his childhood. His father, Narciso (1900–1986), was a lawyer, journalist and five-term legislator of the House of Representatives, who eventually rose to the position of secretary of foreign affairs. As such, Narciso was the Philippine signatory to the ASEAN declaration forged in Bangkok in 1967, and was a founding member of the Liberal Party. According to Ramos's biography for his presidential inauguration in 1992, Narciso served as one of the leaders of the anti-Japanese guerrilla group Maharlika, which was founded by Ferdinand Marcos. His mother, Angela Valdez (1905–1978), was an educator, woman suffragette, and member of the Valdez clan of Batac, Ilocos Norte, making him a second cousin of former president Ferdinand Marcos.

He received elementary education in a Lingayen public school. Ramos began secondary education at the University of the Philippines (UP) High School (now the UP Integrated School), in Manila, and continued in the High School Department of Mapúa Institute of Technology. He graduated high school from Centro Escolar University Integrated School in 1945. Afterwards, he went to the United States as he received an appointment to the United States Military Academy, where he graduated with a Bachelor of Science in Military Engineering degree. He also earned his master's degree in civil engineering at the University of Illinois and later took Civil Engineering Board Exam in 1953, where he placed 8th overall. He also held a master's degree in National Security Administration from the National Defense College of the Philippines and a master's degree in Business Administration from Ateneo de Manila University. In addition, he received a total of 29 honorary doctorate degrees.

=== Marriage ===
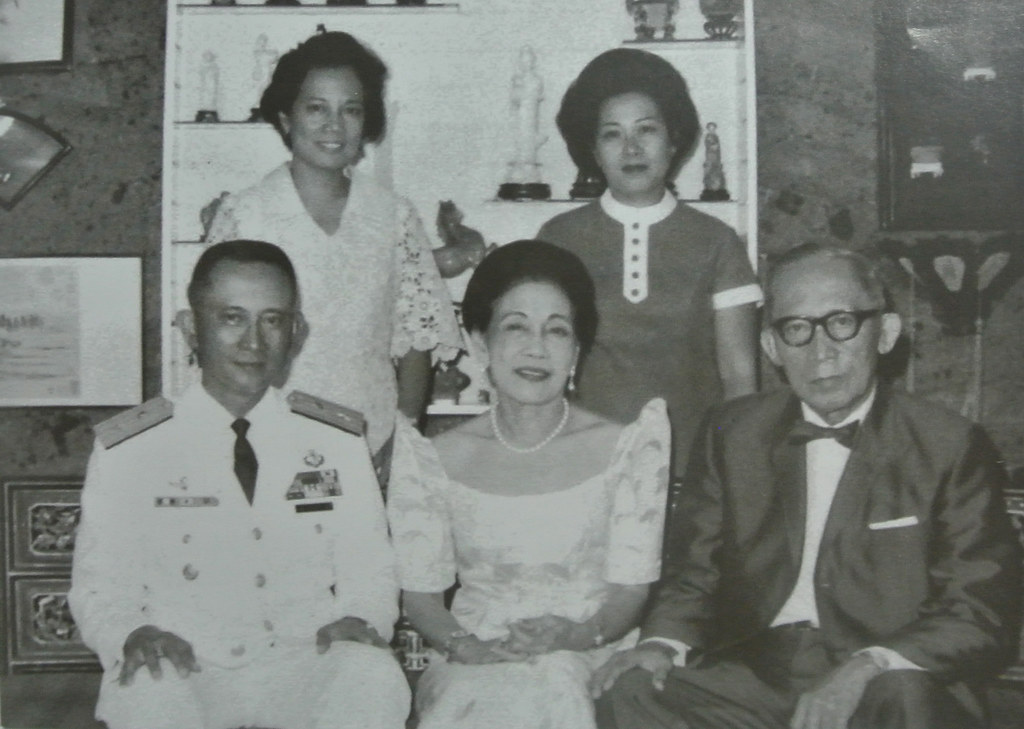
Fidel Ramos (left to the second row) along his wife Amelita (right to the first row) with his parents

Ramos married Amelita Martinez on October 21, 1954, at the Central Church (now known as Central United Methodist Church) in Ermita, Manila. They started as friends while they were classmates at the UP High School and neighbors at Padre Faura Street in Manila. Together, they had five daughters: Angelita Ramos-Jones, Josephine Ramos-Samartino, Carolina Ramos-Sembrano, Cristina Ramos-Jalasco, and Gloria Ramos. They also have five grandsons and three granddaughters.

== Military career ==
=== Early career ===
Ramos went to the United States Military Academy at West Point where he graduated in 1950.

During his stint at the Philippine Army, Ramos founded the Philippine Army Special Forces. Later, he was named as the commander of the Army's 3rd Division based in Cebu City, Cebu.

Ramos received several military awards including the Philippine Legion of Honor (March 18, 1988, and July 19, 1991), the Distinguished Conduct Star (1991), the Distinguished Service Star (May 20, 1966, December 20, 1967, and August 3, 1981), Philippine Military Merit Medal (May 23, 1952), the U.S. Military Academy Distinguished Graduate Award and Legion of Merit (August 1, 1990), and the French Legion of Honor.

=== Korean War service ===
Ramos was a member of the Philippines' 20th Battalion Combat Team of the Philippine Expeditionary Forces to Korea (PEFTOK) that fought in the Korean War. He was an Infantry Reconnaissance Platoon Leader. Ramos was one of the heroes of the Battle of Hill Eerie, where he led his platoon to sabotage the enemy in Hill Eerie.

=== Vietnam War service ===
Ramos was also in the Vietnam War as a non-combat civil military engineer and Chief of Staff of the Philippine Civic Action Group (PHILCAG). It was during this assignment where he forged his lifelong friendship with his junior officer Maj. Jose T. Almonte, who went on to become his National Security Advisor during his administration from 1992 to 1998.

=== Martial Law under Ferdinand Marcos ===
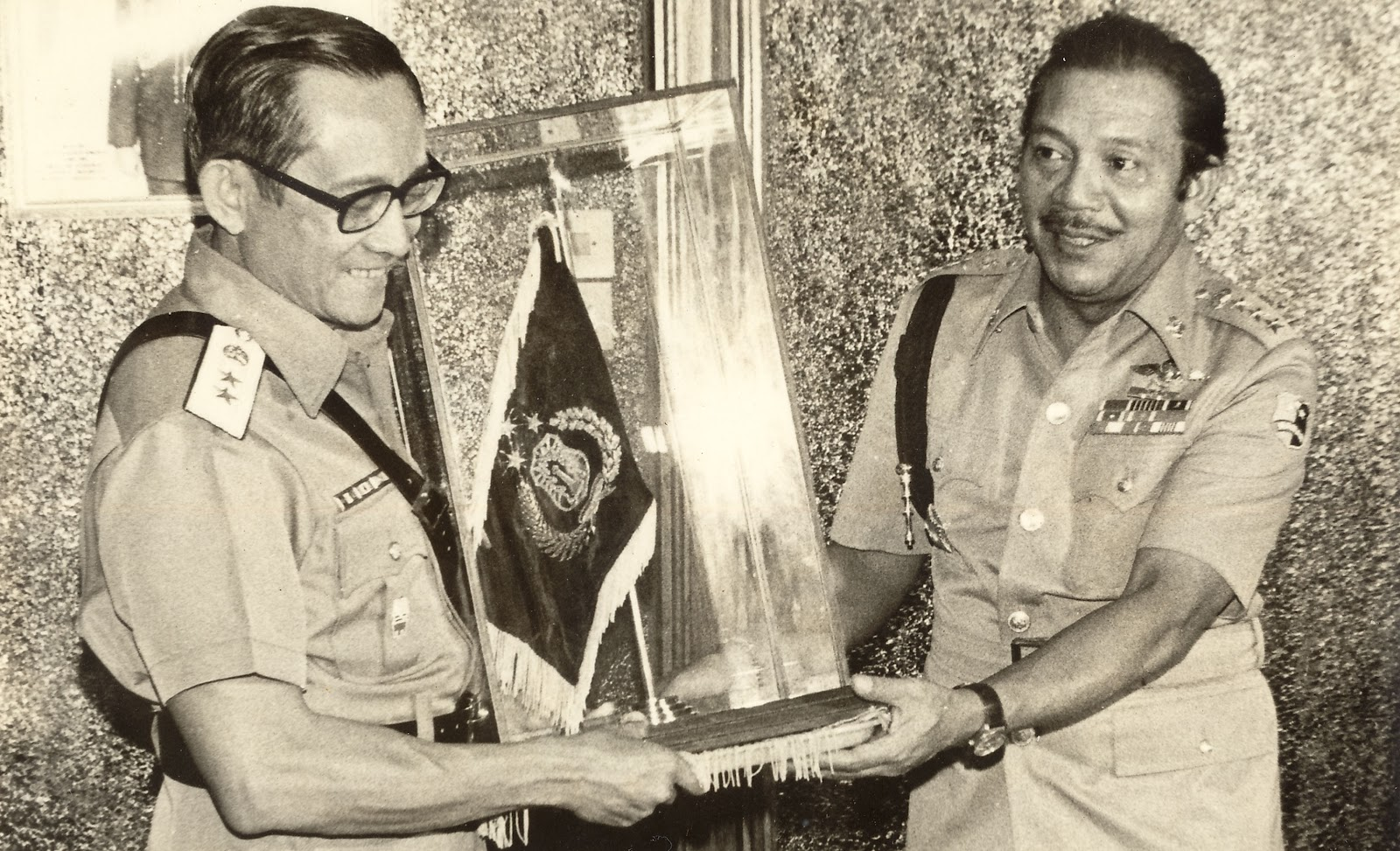
Chief of Indonesian National Police Lieutenant General Awaloeddin Djamin received an honorary visit by Chief of Philippine Constabulary Maj. Gen. Fidel V. Ramos, AFP (left), December 1979

==== Implementation of Martial Law ====
In January 1972, Ramos was appointed head of the Philippine Constabulary, then a major service branch of the Armed Forces of the Philippines, which functioned as the country's national police. He served at this post at the time Ferdinand Marcos imposed Martial Law on September 21, 1972.

In 1975, all civic and municipal police forces in the country were integrated by decree, and it became known as the Integrated National Police (INP), which was under the control and supervision of the Philippine Constabulary. As head of the PC, Ramos was ex officio the INP's first concurrent Director-General.

==== Last years of the Marcos administration ====
Martial Law was formally lifted nine years later on January 17, 1981, but Marcos retained absolute powers. Due to his accomplishments, Ramos was one of the candidates for the position of Chief of Staff of the Armed Forces of the Philippines in 1981, as replacement to the retiring General Romeo Espino who was the nation's longest serving chief of staff. Ramos lost to General Fabian Ver a graduate of the University of the Philippines, whom Marcos appointed to the top military post. Instead Ramos, a cousin of Marcos was named AFP Vice-Chief of staff in 1982, and promoted to the rank of lieutenant general, while remaining as PC-INP Chief.

On May 12, 1983, a new unit in the former Philippine Constabulary was organized to deal with so-called "terrorist-related" crimes, and named as the Philippine Constabulary Special Action Force as a requirement of General Order 323 of Philippine Constabulary Headquarters. Fidel Ramos and Gen. Renato de Villa were the founders of the unit. De Villa tasked Rosendo Ferrer and Sonny Razon to organize a Special Action Force. Subsequently, a training program called the SAF Ranger Course, was used to train the 1st generation of SAF troopers, which numbered 149. Of that number, 26 were commissioned officers while the rest were enlisted personnel recruited from a wide range of PC units such as the defunct PC Brigade, the Long Range Patrol Battalion (LRP), the K-9 Support Company, PC Special Organized Group, the Light Reaction Unit (LRU) of PC METROCOM, the Constabulary Off-shore Action Command (COSAC), and other PC Units. Later on, they changed the name of the course to the SAF Commando Course.

On August 8, 1983, during a speech in Camp Crame to commemorate Philippine Constabulary Day, Marcos announced his removal of Defense Minister Juan Ponce Enrile from the chain of command, and the creation of a new arrangement with himself as Commander-in-Chief of the Armed Forces replacing AFP Chief of Staff Gen. Fabian Ver. Marcos also removed the operational control of the Integrated National Police from the Philippine Constabulary under Gen. Ramos and transferred it under the direct control of Gen. Ver; the Constabulary then had only administrative supervision over the INP.

=== Role in the EDSA Revolution ===
On February 22, 1986, Defense Minister Juan Ponce Enrile protested alleged fraud committed by Marcos in the 1986 snap elections, withdrawing support and triggering the non-violent People Power Revolution. General Ramos later also defected and followed Enrile into Camp Crame, and the duo shifted their fealty to Corazón Aquino, the widow of Senator Benigno Aquino and Marcos' main election rival. On February 25, the "EDSA Revolution" reached its peak when Marcos, along with his family and some supporters, fled into exile in Hawaii with the assistance of the United States government, ending his 20-year rule, leaving Corazon Aquino to accede as the country's first female President. Later in life, Ramos would say he considered his role in the revolution as his "atonement" for his role in the implementation of Martial Law.

=== Combat record ===
When belittled by the press regarding his combat record, Ramos responded with trademark sarcasm (July 31, 1987):

I fought the communists as part of the battalion combat teams, I went up the ladder. Battalion staff officer. Company commander. Task Force commander. Special Forces group commander. Brigade commander. All in different periods in our country. Huk campaign. Korean War campaign. The Vietnam War, and I was the head of the advance party of the PHILCAG (Philippine Civil Action Group to Vietnam) that went to a tiny province at the Cambodian border – the so-called Alligator Jaw – War Zone Z where even Max Soliven said The Viet-Cong will eat us up. Of course, we were physically there as non-combat troops. But you try to be a non-combat troop in a combat area – that is the toughest kind of assignment.

Korea – as a Recon platoon leader. What is the job of a recon leader? To recon the front line – no man's land. And what did we do? I had to assault a fortified position of the Chinese communists and wiped them out. And what is this Special Forces group that we commanded in the Army – '62–'65? That was the only remaining combat unit in the Philippine Army. The rest were training in a military division unit set-up. We were in Luzon. We were in Sulu. And then, during the previous regime, Marawi incident. Who was sent there? Ramos. We defended the camp, being besieged by 400 rebels.

So next time, look at the man's record, don't just write and write. You said, no combat experience, no combat experience. Look around you who comes from the platoon, who rose to battalion staff, company commander, group commander, which is like a battalion, brigade commander, here and abroad. Abroad, I never had an abroad assignment that was not combat. NO SOFT JOBS FOR RAMOS. Thirty-seven years in the Armed Forces. REMEMBER THAT. You're only writing about the fringe, but do not allow yourself to destroy the armed forces by those guys. You write about the majority of the Armed Forces who are on the job.

That's why we're here enjoying our freedom, ladies and gentlemen. You are here. If the majority of the Armed Forces did not do their job, I doubt very much if you'd all be here.

=== Chief of Staff of the Armed Forces and Secretary of National Defense ===
After Corazon Aquino assumed the Presidency, she appointed Ramos as Chief of Staff of the Armed Forces of the Philippines (1986–1988), and later Secretary of National Defense as well as Chairman of the National Disaster Coordinating Council (1988–1991), handling the government's response to disasters such as the 1990 Luzon earthquake and the 1991 eruption of Mount Pinatubo.

During this time, Ramos personally handled the military operations that crushed nine coup attempts against the Aquino government.

== 1992 presidential campaign: EDSA '92 ==
In December 1991, Ramos declared his candidacy for president. However, he lost the nomination of the then-dominant party Laban ng Demokratikong Pilipino (LDP) to House Speaker Ramon Mitra Jr. Days later, he bolted from the LDP and founded his own party, the Partido Lakas Tao (People Power Party), inviting Cebu Governor Emilio Mario Osmeña to be his running mate. The party formed a coalition with the National Union of Christian Democrats (NUCD) of Senator & DFA Secretary Raul Manglapus and the United Muslim Democrats of the Philippines (UMDP) of Ambassador Sanchez Ali, and turned into Lakas–NUCD Ramos and Osmeña, together with Congressman (later House Speaker) Jose de Venecia, campaigned for economic reforms and improved national security and unity.

He won the seven-way race on May 11, 1992, narrowly defeating popular Agrarian Reform Secretary Miriam Defensor Santiago. His running mate, Governor Osmeña, lost to Senator Joseph Estrada as vice president. Despite winning, he garnered only 23.58% of the vote, the lowest plurality in the country's history. The election results were marred by allegations of fraud as Santiago was leading the race for the first five days of counting but became second after a nationwide energy black-out, putting Ramos in first place. International media were already calling Santiago as the president-elect but withdrew their declarations because of the sudden change in positions in the vote tally. Santiago filed an electoral protest, but it was eventually junked by the Supreme Court. The quote, "Miriam won in the elections, but lost in the counting" became popular nationwide.

De los Santos alleged that Libyan leader Muammar al-Qaddafi had channeled $200,000 (5 million pesos) to Ramos' 1992 election campaign. Philippine election laws prohibit accepting contribution from foreigners. Ramos dismissed the claim as "hearsay by itself, and is further based on a string of successive hearsay conversations" and challenged anyone who presumed the claim's veracity to produce evidence.

== Presidency (1992–1998) ==
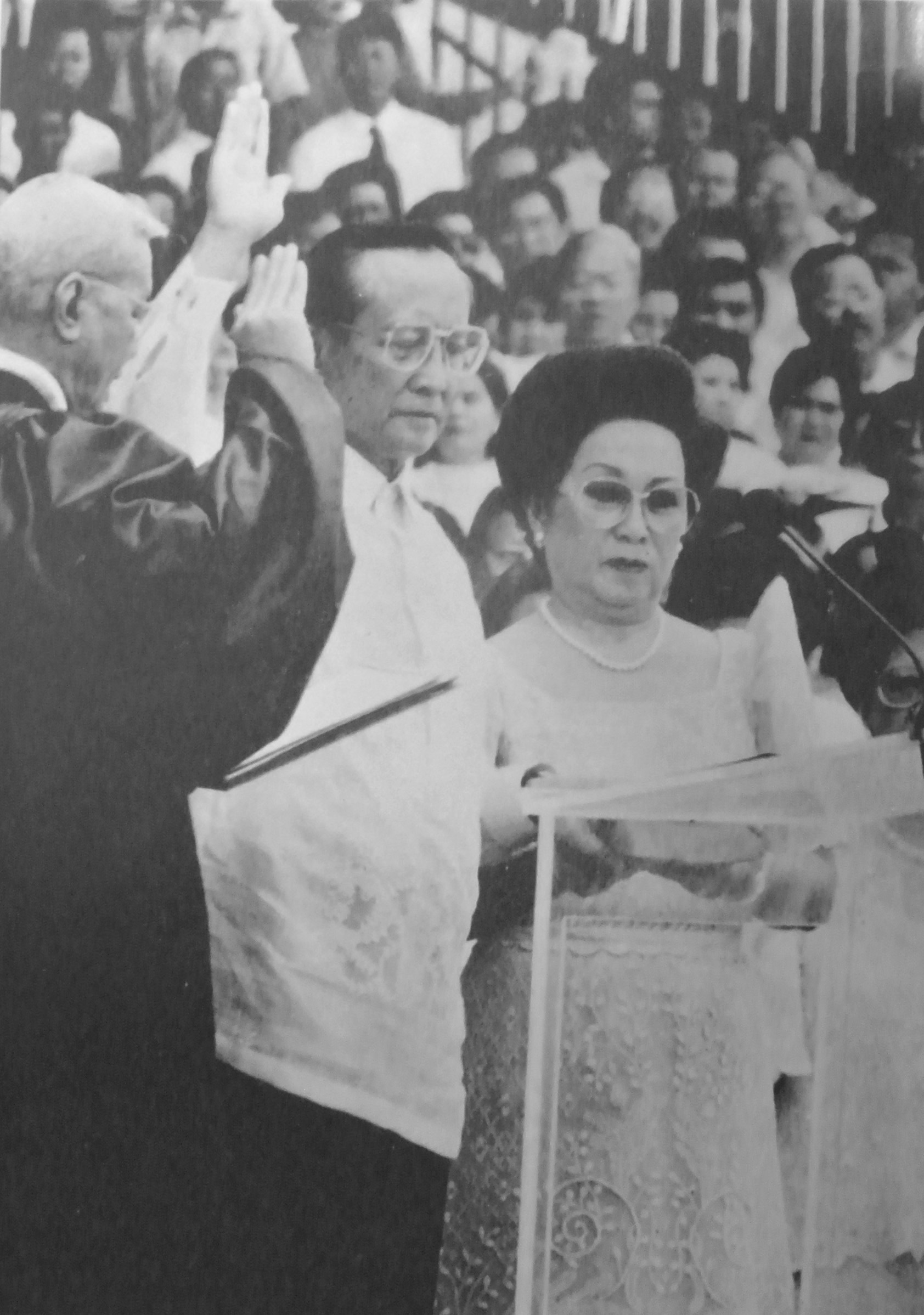
Ramos taking his oath of office as the 12th president of the Philippines on June 30, 1992.

Presidential styles of Fidel V. Ramos
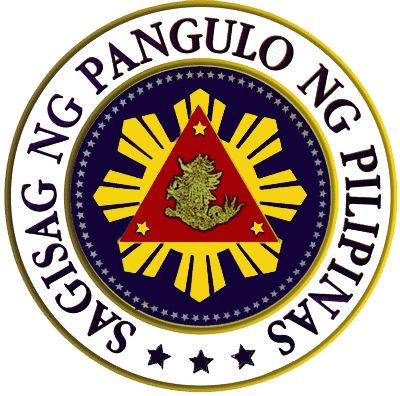
- Reference style: His Excellency
- Spoken style: Your Excellency
- Alternative style: Mr. President

At the time of his accession in 1992, he was the first and only Protestant to date to be elected President of the Philippines, which has a majority-Roman Catholic population, and the only Filipino officer in history to have held every rank in the Philippine military from Second Lieutenant to Commander-in-Chief.

The first three years of his administration were characterized by an economic boom, technological development, political stability, and efficient delivery of basic needs to the people. He advocated party platforms as an outline and agenda for governance. He was the first Christian Democrat to be elected in the country, being the founder of Lakas-CMD (Christian-Muslim Democrats Party). He was one of the most influential leaders and the unofficial spokesman of liberal democracy in Asia.

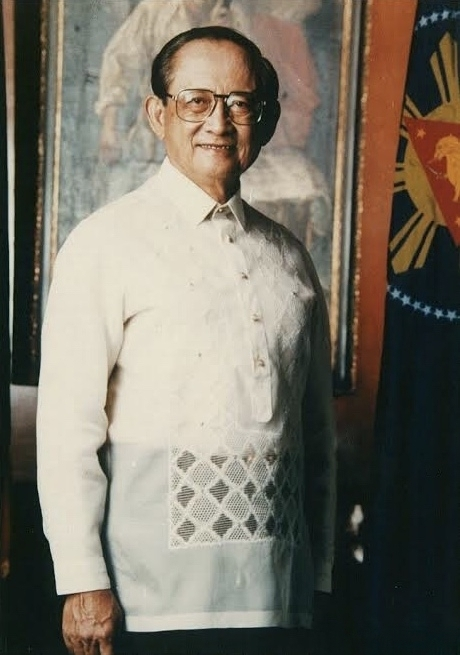
Official portrait, 1995

=== Domestic policies ===
==== Philippines 2000 ====
Ramos' policies were organized around a socio-economic program dubbed "Philippines 2000", which envisioned the Philippines achieving a newly industrialized country status by the year 2000 and beyond.

The five points of the program were:

- Peace and Stability
- Economic Growth and Sustainable Development
- Energy and Power Generation
- Environmental Protection
- Streamlined Bureaucracy

Contrary to expectations as a former military general, Ramos made peace with the country's various armed rebel groups, kickstarting the process by creating a National Unification Commission (NUC) and appointing Haydee Yorac to be its chair.

Upon the recommendation of the NUC, Ramos eventually decided to grant amnesty to the rebel military officers of the Reform the Armed Forces Movement (RAM) led by Gregorio Honasan and Proceso Maligalig.

Ramos was instrumental in the signing of the final peace agreement between the government and the Moro National Liberation Front (MNLF) led by Nur Misuari in 1996.

Although he battled Communist rebels as a young lieutenant in the 1950s, Ramos signed into law the Republic Act No. 7636, which repealed the Anti-Subversion Law. With its repeal, membership in the once-outlawed Communist Party of the Philippines became legal. It was also during his presidency that the Comprehensive Agreement on Respect for Human Rights and International Humanitarian Law (CARHRIHL), which provided a mechanism to monitor human rights abuses in the course of operations was signed between the government and the CPP on 16 March 1998.

==== Economic reforms ====
Economy of the Philippines under President Fidel Ramos 1992–1998
Population
- 1992: $\approx$ 63.82 million

Gross Domestic Product (constant 1985 prices)
- 1992: ▲ Ph₱ 718,941 million
- 1997: ▲Ph₱ 893,151 million
- Growth rate, 1992–1998 average: 4.9%

Per capita income (constant 1985 prices)
- 1992: ▲ Ph₱ 11,265
- 1997: ▲ Ph₱ 12,147

Total exports
- 1992: ▲ Ph₱ 250,610 million
- 1997: ▲ Ph₱ 743,469 million

Exchange rates
- 1 US$ = Ph₱ 29.47; 1 Ph₱ = US$ 0.034
- Sources: FIDEL V. RAMOS

During his administration, Ramos began implementing economic reforms intended to open up the once-closed national economy, encourage private enterprise, invite more foreign and domestic investment, and reduce corruption. Ramos ended the government's monopoly over the skies and opened aviation to new players. Ramos was also known as the most-traveled Philippine President compared to his predecessors with numerous foreign trips abroad, generating about US$20 billion worth of foreign investments to the Philippines. To ensure a positive financial outlook on the Philippines, Ramos led the 4th Asia Pacific Economic Cooperation (APEC) Leaders' Summit in the Philippines in November 1996.

Under his administration, the Philippines enjoyed economic growth and stability. The Philippine Stock Exchange in the mid-1990s was one of the best in the world and his visions of 'Philippines 2000' that led the country into a newly industrialized country in the world and the "Tiger Cub Economy in Asia".

==== Power crisis ====
At the start of Ramos' tenure, the Philippines was experiencing widespread blackouts due to huge demand for electricity, the antiquity of power plants, the abolishment of the Department of Energy, and the discontinuation of the Bataan Nuclear Power Plant during the Corazon Aquino administration. During his State of the Nation address on July 27, 1992, he requested that the Congress enact a law that would create an Energy Department that would plan and manage the Philippines' energy demands. Congress not only created the department but gave him special emergency powers to resolve the power crisis. Using the powers given to him, Ramos issued licenses to independent power producers (IPP) to construct power plants within 24 months. Ramos issued supply contracts that guaranteed the government would buy whatever power the IPPs produced under the contract in U.S. dollars to entice investments in power plants. This became a problem during the 1997 Asian financial crisis when the demand for electricity contracted and the Philippine peso lost half of its value.

Ramos personally pushed for the speedy approval of some of the most expensive power deals, and justified signing more contracts despite warnings from within the government and the World Bank that an impending oversupply of electricity could push up prices, a situation that persists in the Philippines up to the present. Individuals linked to Ramos lobbied for the approval of some of the contracts for independent power producers (IPPs), which came with numerous other deals, including lucrative legal, technical, and financial consultancies that were given to individuals and companies close to him. Among the deals tied to IPP projects were insurance contracts in which companies made millions of dollars in commissions alone. All the IPP contracts came with attractive incentives and guarantees. Every contract was designed to give IPP creditors some degree of comfort in financing ventures that would usually involve huge capital and risks. Most IPPs were funded by foreign loans secured with a form of government guarantee or performance undertaking, which meant that the Philippine government would pay for the loans if the IPPs defaulted. The Ramos government continued signing IPP contracts even after the end of 1993 when the power crisis was considered solved. The World Bank came up with a report in 1994 warning that power rates would rise if the government continued to enter into more IPP contracts that would mean excess power. The World Bank questioned the ambitious projections of the government on economic growth and power demand from 1994 to 1998. It also warned that the power generated by private utilities' IPPs could duplicate those of the National Power Corporation and create an overcapacity. The World Bank said that the factors created considerable uncertainty in power demand, like substantial overcapacity, particularly under take-or-pay conditions and would require considerable tariff increases that would be unpopular with the public.

==== Death penalty ====
While campaigning for the presidency, Ramos declared his support for reinstating the death penalty. Capital punishment was abolished for all crimes in 1987, making the Philippines the first Asian country to do so. In 1996, Ramos signed a bill that returned capital punishment with the electric chair (method used from 1923 to 1976, making Philippines the only country to do so outside U.S.) "until the gas chamber could be installed". However, no one was electrocuted or gassed, because the previously used chair was destroyed earlier in a fire and the Philippines adopted the method of lethal injection. After his presidency, some people were put to death by this means, until the death penalty was abolished again in 2006.

=== Foreign policies ===
==== Spratly Islands ====
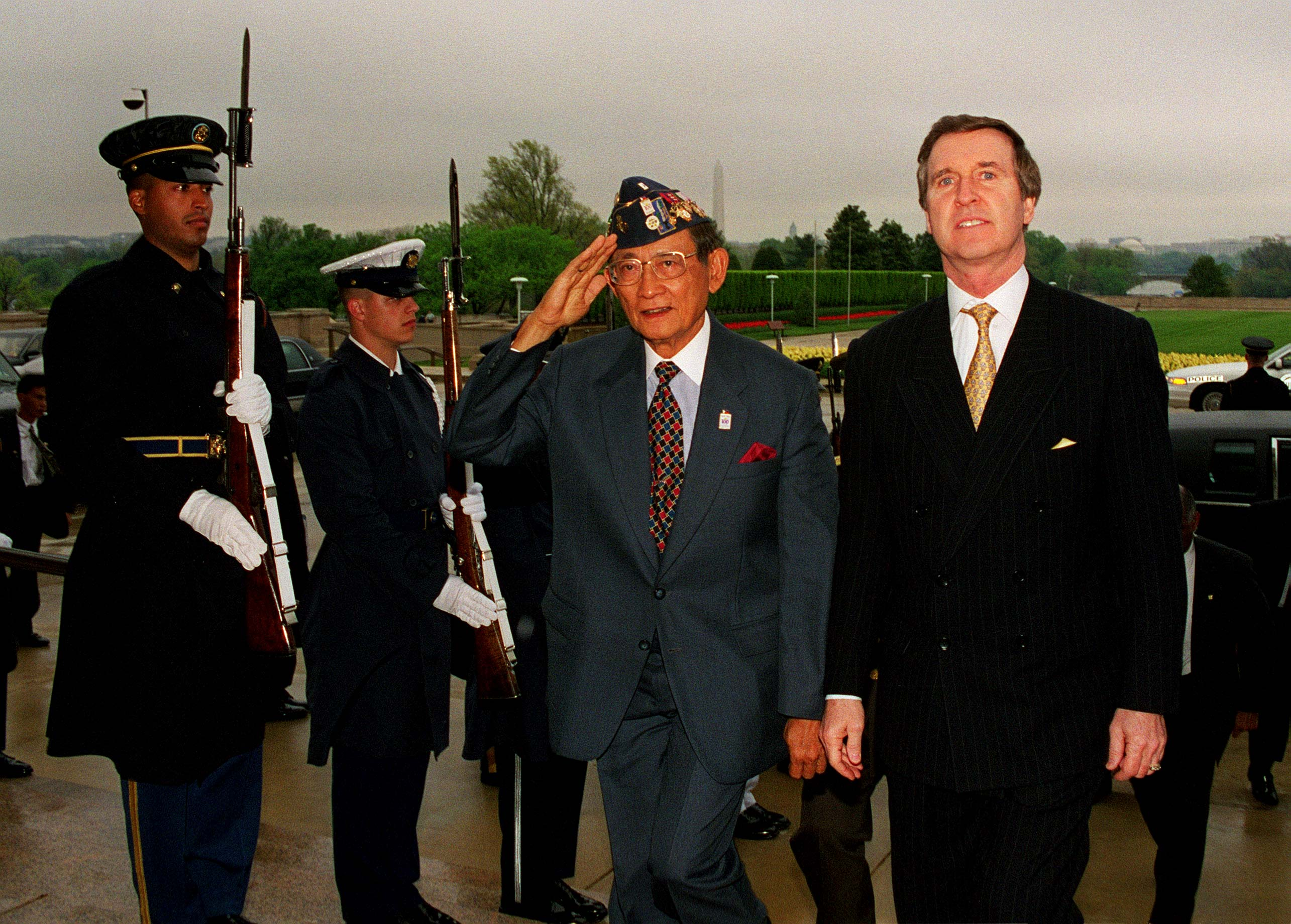
President Fidel V. Ramos troops the honor guards at the Pentagon with Secretary of Defense William Cohen during a state visit in 1998.

In early 1995, the Philippines discovered a primitive PRC military structure on Mischief Reef in the Spratly Islands, 130 nautical miles (240 km; 150 mi) off the coast of Palawan. The Philippine government issued a formal protest over the PRC's occupation of the reef and the Philippine Navy arrested sixty-two Chinese fishermen at Half Moon Shoal, eighty kilometers from Palawan. A week later, following confirmation from surveillance pictures that the structures were of military design, President Fidel Ramos had the military forces in the region strengthened. He ordered the Philippine Air Force to dispatch five F-5 fighters backed by four jet trainers and two helicopters, while the navy sent two additional ships. The People's Republic of China had claimed that the structures were shelters for fishermen but these small incidents could have triggered a war in the South China Sea.

==== Migrant workers protection ====
A perceived weakness of his administration was the situation in handling migrant workers' protection, a very major issue in the Philippines, as there are millions of Filipinos abroad throughout the world serving as workers in foreign countries, and their remittances to relatives at home are very important to the Filipino economy. On the eve of his 67th birthday on March 17, 1995, Ramos was on a foreign trip when Flor Contemplación was hanged in Singapore. His last-minute effort to negotiate with Singapore President Ong Teng Cheong and Prime Minister Goh Chok Tong failed and Ramos' return was marred with protests after his arrival in Manila. The protests also caused the resignation of Foreign Affairs Secretary Roberto Romulo and Labor Secretary Nieves Confesor from the cabinet. He immediately recalled Philippine ambassador to Singapore Alicia Ramos and suspended diplomatic relations with Singapore and created a special commission to look into the case, which was in part an effort to try to rescue his sagging popularity. The commission was led by retired Supreme Court Justice Emilio Gancayco.

As recommended by the Gancayco Commission, Ramos facilitated the enactment of Republic Act No. 8042, better known as the "Migrant Workers and Overseas Filipinos Act of 1995", which was signed into law on June 7, 1995. Learning from the lessons of the Contemplación case, Ramos immediately ordered Philippines Ambassador to the UAE Roy Señeres to facilitate negotiations after learning of the death penalty verdict of Sarah Balabagan in September 1995. Balabagan's sentence was reduced and she was released in August 1996. After tensions cooled off, Ramos restored diplomatic relations with Singapore after meeting Goh Chok Tong on the sidelines during the 50th anniversary of the United Nations in New York City.

==== 1997 Asian financial crisis ====
The 1997 Asian financial crisis, which started in Thailand, was a major blow to the end of the Ramos administration, with him stepping down with a negative GDP growth. The economy was hit by currency devaluation with the Philippine Peso dropped to ₱45.42/$1 in January 1998 from ₱26.40/$1 in July 1997. The same was true for the Thai baht, Malaysian ringgit, and Indonesian rupiah. Growth fell to about −0.6% in 1998 from 5.2% in 1997, but recovered to 3.4% by 1999. It also resulted in the shutdown of some businesses, a decline in importation, a rising unemployment rate, and an unstable financial sector.

==== Clark Centennial Expo Scandal ====
Supposedly, one of his notable contributions to the Philippines was the revival of nationalistic spirit by embarking on a massive promotion campaign for the centennial of Philippine Independence celebrated on June 12, 1998. However, charges of alleged massive corruption or misuse of funds blemished the resulting programs and various projects, one of which was the Centennial Expo and Amphitheater at the former Clark Air Base in Angeles City, supposedly Ramos's pet project. The commemorative projects, particularly those undertaken at Clark, were hounded by illegal electioneering and corruption controversies even years after the Centennial celebrations. Clark Air Base at that point was already completely free of American interference and therefore conceived as a suitable venue for Independence Day. In 1992, all American military bases were transferred to Philippine control after the Senate rejected the military bases agreement with the United States.

Later on it was revealed through a special report by the Philippine Center for Investigative Journalism (PCIJ) that the projects relating to the Expo site not only revealed the extravagance and inefficiency of the administration, but also served as a convenient vehicle to affect election fund-raising for the LAKAS political party of Ramos, which came at the expense of tax-payers and was in direct violation of the Election Code. The Centennial Expo Pilipino project, intended to be the centerpiece for celebrating the 100th anniversary of the country's independence from Spain, also earned extensive criticism for being an expensive white elephant project that disadvantaged the government at the cost of ₱9 billion or 1.7 percent of the country's 1998 national budget. Six ranking Ramos cabinet members and officials, headed by Salvador Laurel (former vice-president), chairman of the Centennial Commission, were cleared by the Ombudsman and the Sandiganbayan. Ramos appeared before a Congressional Committee in October 1998 to help exonerate said officials of any wrongdoing.

==== Charter change ====
During his final years in office, Ramos tried to amend the country's 1987 constitution through a process popularly known to many Filipinos as charter change or cha-cha. Widespread protests led by Corazon Aquino and the Roman Catholic Church stopped him from pushing through with the plan. Political analysts were divided as to whether Ramos really wanted to use charter change to extend his presidency or only to imbalance his opponents as the next presidential election neared. He also intended to extend the term limits of the presidency to remain in power but his political rival Miriam Defensor Santiago went to the Supreme Court and negated extending the term limit of the president, which preserved democracy at the time.

== Post-presidency (1998–2022) ==
=== Activities ===
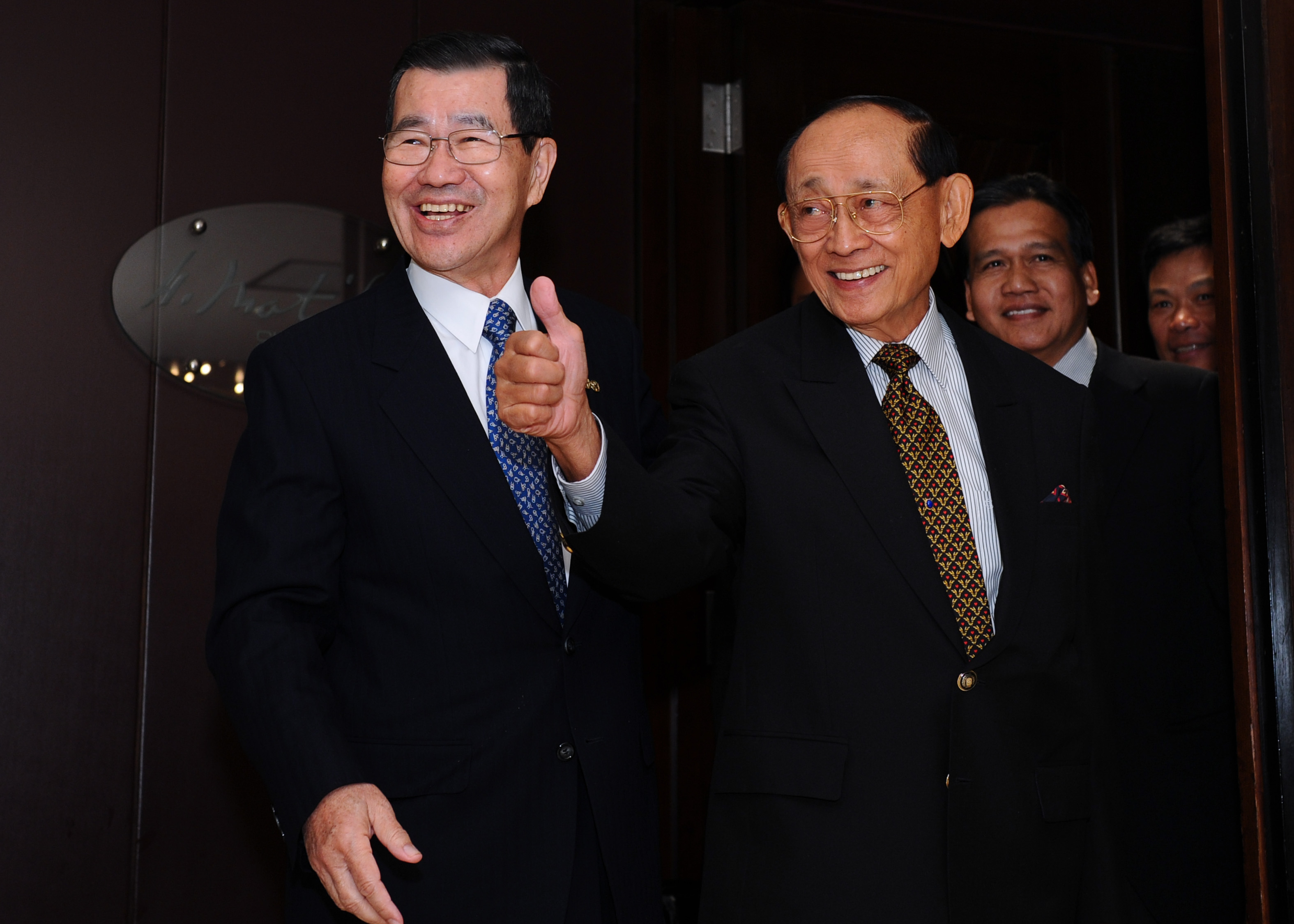
Ramos (right) with Vice President of Taiwan Vincent Siew on March 7, 2011

==== EDSA II ====
In January 2001, Ramos was instrumental in the success of the so-called Second EDSA Revolution that deposed Philippine president Joseph Estrada and installed then-Vice President Gloria Macapagal Arroyo as president.

Ramos was Chairman Emeritus of his party now named Lakas–CMD. The CMD or Christian–Muslim Democrats in the party's name adopted in 2003 which led by then-President Gloria Macapagal Arroyo.

At the height of the election-rigging scandal in July 2005, Ramos publicly convinced President Gloria Macapagal Arroyo not to resign from office. Ramos, who was also hounded by charges of electoral fraud during the 1992 elections which were never proven in the Supreme Court, repeatedly stated that the scandal is nowhere as grave as that of People Power Revolutions of 1986 and 2001, citing factors such as the stagnant Philippine economy in the final years of the Marcos regime as well as the allegedly massive corruption of the Estrada administration. According to Arroyo, he also showed full support to her during the failed coups in the latter part of her presidency.

=== Advocacies ===
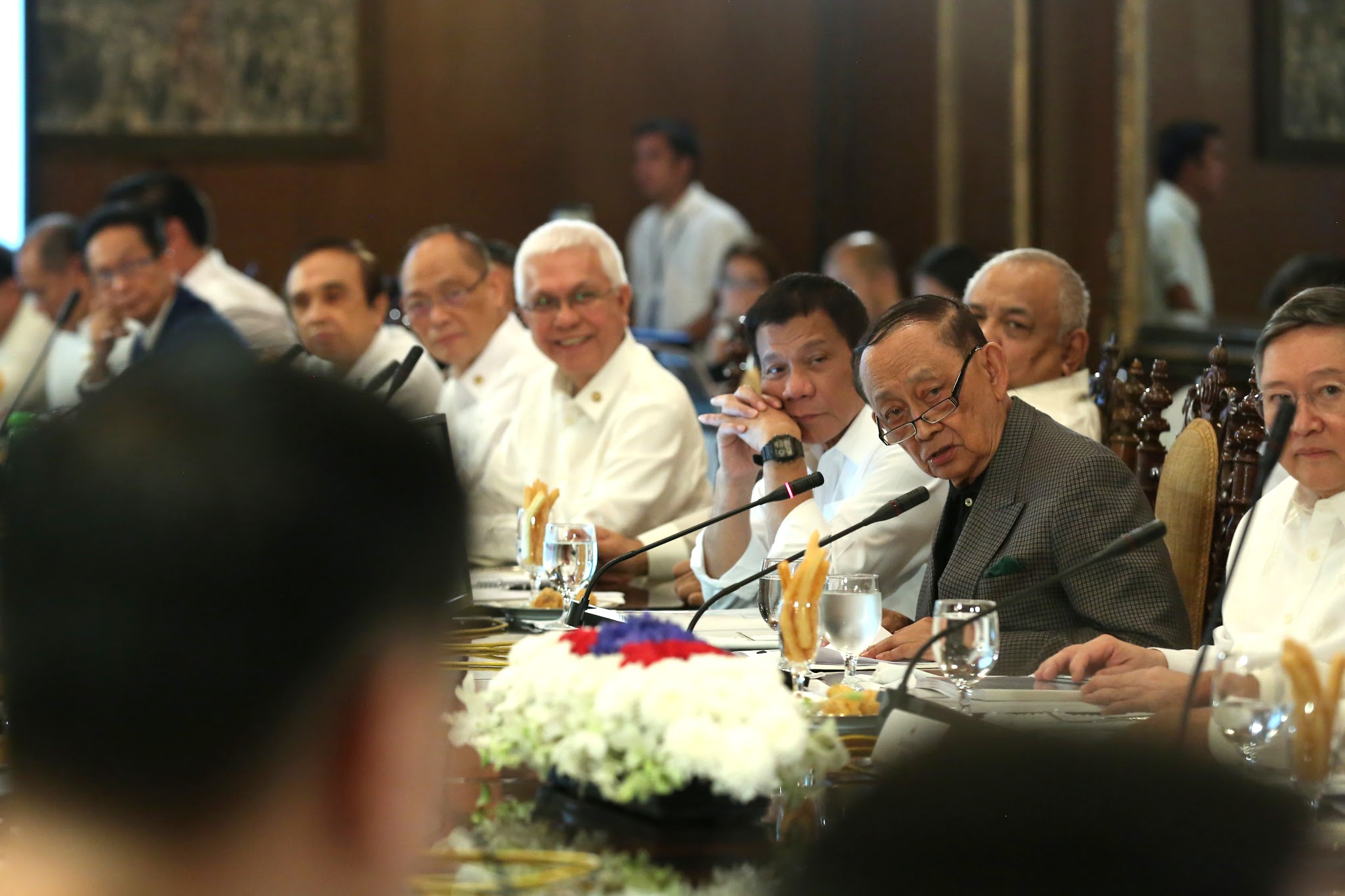
Ramos, then-Philippine Special Envoy to China, briefs President Rodrigo Duterte and the cabinet.

Ramos also unveiled his proposals for constitutional change of the country. Citing the need to be more economically competitive in the midst of globalization and the need to improve governance for all Filipinos, Ramos suggested that government should start the process of Charter Change with a set deadline in 2007 (by which time the new charter and new government would take effect). Ramos supported the transformation of the country's political system from the Philippine presidential-bicameral-system into a unicameral parliament in transition to a federal form.

Ramos represented the Philippines in the ASEAN Eminent Persons Group, tasked to draft the Charter of the Association of South East Asian Nations (ASEAN). He was also a member of numerous international groups and fora, and was the chairman of the board of directors of the Boao Forum for Asia (also one of the co-founders of BFA) and co-chairman of the Global Meeting of the Emerging Markets Forum (EMF). Ramos was heavily recommended for the position of the United Nations envoy to Myanmar (formerly known as Burma) in June 2006.

He served as the Carlyle Group Asia Advisor Board Member until the board was disbanded in February 2004. More recently, as a private citizen, Ramos was engaged in various private sector advocacies where he played prominent roles. These included; chairman, Ramos Peace and Development Foundation; chairman, Boao Forum for Asia; Trustee, International Crisis Group (ICG); Member, Advisory Group, UN University for Peace; Honorary Director, General Douglas MacArthur Foundation; Founding Member, Policy Advisory Commission, World Intellectual Property Organization (PAC-WIPO); Honorary Member, World Commission on Water for the 21st century; Member, International Advisory Council, Asia House; Patron, Opportunity International (Philippines); Global Advisor, University of Winnipeg; Honorary Chairman, Yuchengco Center, De La Salle University; Member, Advisory Board, Metrobank; Honorary President, Human Development Network (HDN) Philippines; Lifetime Honorary President, Christian Democrats International (CDI); and Chairman Emeritus, Lakas-Christian Muslim Democrats (CMD) Party.

Ramos was also a firm backer of the proposed Philippine Reproductive Health bill. During a meet-up with fellow RH bill supporters in May 2011, he urged President Benigno Aquino III to certify the RH bill as urgent, saying it is the "right thing" to do. During his administration, the Department of Health under Juan Flavier launched an intense drive to promote family planning. Asiaweek reported in August 1994 that under Ramos, "family planning funding has quintupled." They also noted that President Ramos "has gone the farthest of any administration in opposing the Church's positions on contraception and abortion." As of 2024, Ramos was listed by the Forum for Family Planning and Development as one of its Eminent Persons.

Ramos was a member of the Global Leadership Foundation, an organization which works to support democratic leadership, prevent and resolve conflict through mediation and promote good governance in the form of democratic institutions, open markets, human rights and the rule of law. It does so by making available, discreetly and in confidence, the experience of former leaders to today's national leaders. It is a not-for-profit organization composed of former heads of government, senior governmental and international organization officials who work closely with Heads of Government on governance-related issues of concern to them.

=== Ramos Peace and Development Foundation ===
After his presidency, Ramos founded the Ramos Foundation for Peace and Development (RPDEV) with offices located in the Urban Bank Building (now ExportBank Plaza) in Makati. The foundation is a non-partisan, nonprofit, non-stock organization dedicated to promoting peace and development in the Philippines and the larger Asia-Pacific region. RPDEV supports Philippine national interests and people empowerment. Operating as a network of individuals and institutions inside and outside the country, it is meant to serve as a catalyst for constructive change, a medium for fostering unity, stability, and progress, and a force for mutual understanding.

=== Philippine Envoy to China ===
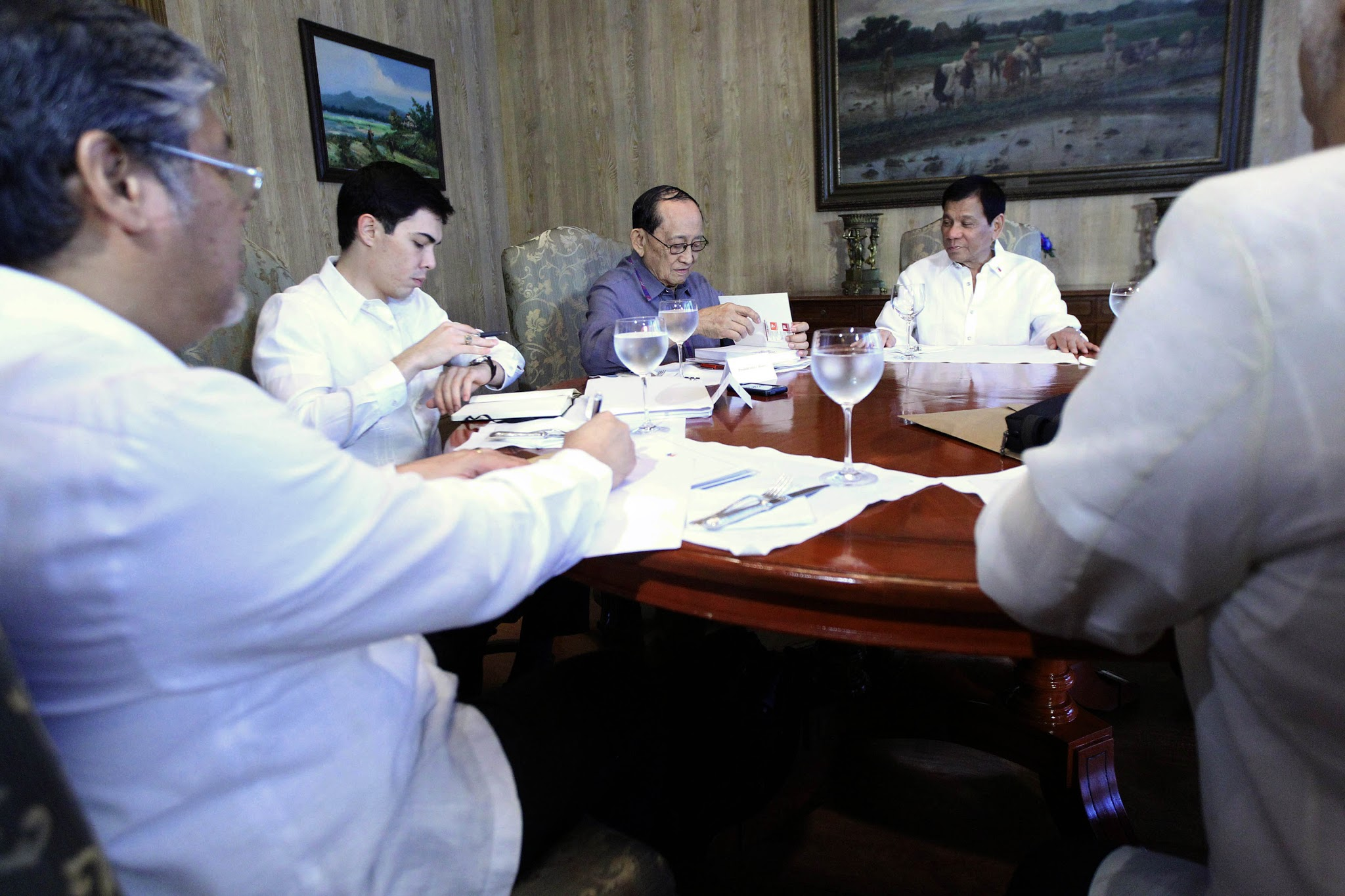
Ramos (center) as Special Envoy to China meets with President Rodrigo Duterte (right) on September 14, 2016.

President-elect Rodrigo Duterte revealed in June 2016 that Ramos was the one who pushed him to run for office so that "Mindanao will finally have a Filipino president."

On July 23, 2016, Ramos was appointed by President Duterte as the Philippine Envoy to China to strengthen bilateral ties again after a much-heated diplomatic war over the South China Sea. On 8 August 2016, the Philippines him to Hong Kong to mitigate tensions. Ramos met with Fu Ying (chair of China's Foreign Affairs Committee for the National People's Congress) and Wu Shicun (president of the National Institute for South China Sea Studies). Ramos conveyed the Philippines' willingness to engage in formal discussions with China. The three issued a statement in their personal capacities emphasizing cooperation and dialogue between the two countries.

On November 1, 2016, Ramos sent his resignation after President Duterte returned from his state visit to China "because the officials have taken over." Duterte accepted his resignation from the post on the same day. He was replaced by veteran journalist Jose Santiago "Chito" Sta. Romana.

After stepping down, while he continued to show support to President Rodrigo Duterte, he had been vocal in raising concerns and criticisms to his administration. In February 2017, Ramos raised his concern about impunity and unilateralism amidst the drug war. In May 2017, Ramos criticized government officials who went with Duterte to Russia, claiming they turned the President's official visit into a "junket", which the Palace later denied. In September 2017, Ramos said the Philippines continued to "lose badly" under the Duterte administration. Despite his criticisms, Duterte still saw him as his "number one supporter" and at the same time his "number one critic", and even called him his "everything."

=== COVID-19 pandemic ===
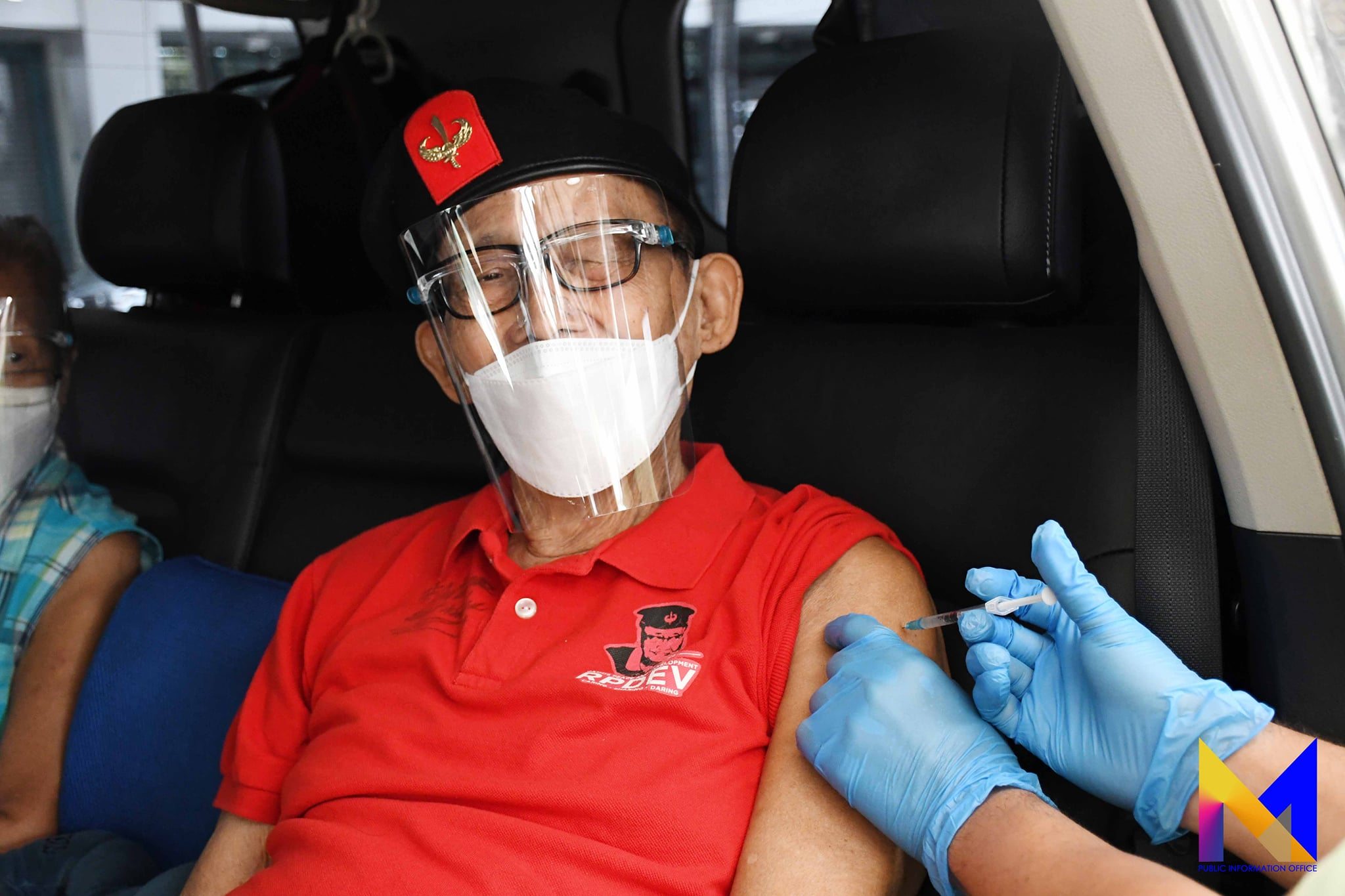
Ramos pictured on June 25, 2021, receiving his second dose of Sinovac's COVID-19 vaccine in Muntinlupa.

During the COVID-19 pandemic in the Philippines, he stayed under strict home quarantine and kept himself updated of the latest news including the pandemic. On June 25, 2021, he completed his COVID-19 vaccination by receiving his second dose in Ayala Alabang, Muntinlupa, where he had lived.

On March 18, 2022, on Ramos' 94th birthday, the Fidel V. Ramos Presidential Library was launched online. It became the first and, so far, the only online presidential library in the Philippines. It was later revealed that Ramos was already ill at this time and was unable to take on visitors.

=== 2022 elections ===
Ramos did not make his endorsement public during the 2022 elections, but he pledged support for the presidential bid of Leni Robredo, whom he had also successfully endorsed for vice president in 2016. This was despite the fact that his party Lakas–CMD had earlier adopted her rival Bongbong Marcos, who was the running mate of Lakas chairperson Sara Duterte, as its presidential candidate.

== Death and funeral ==
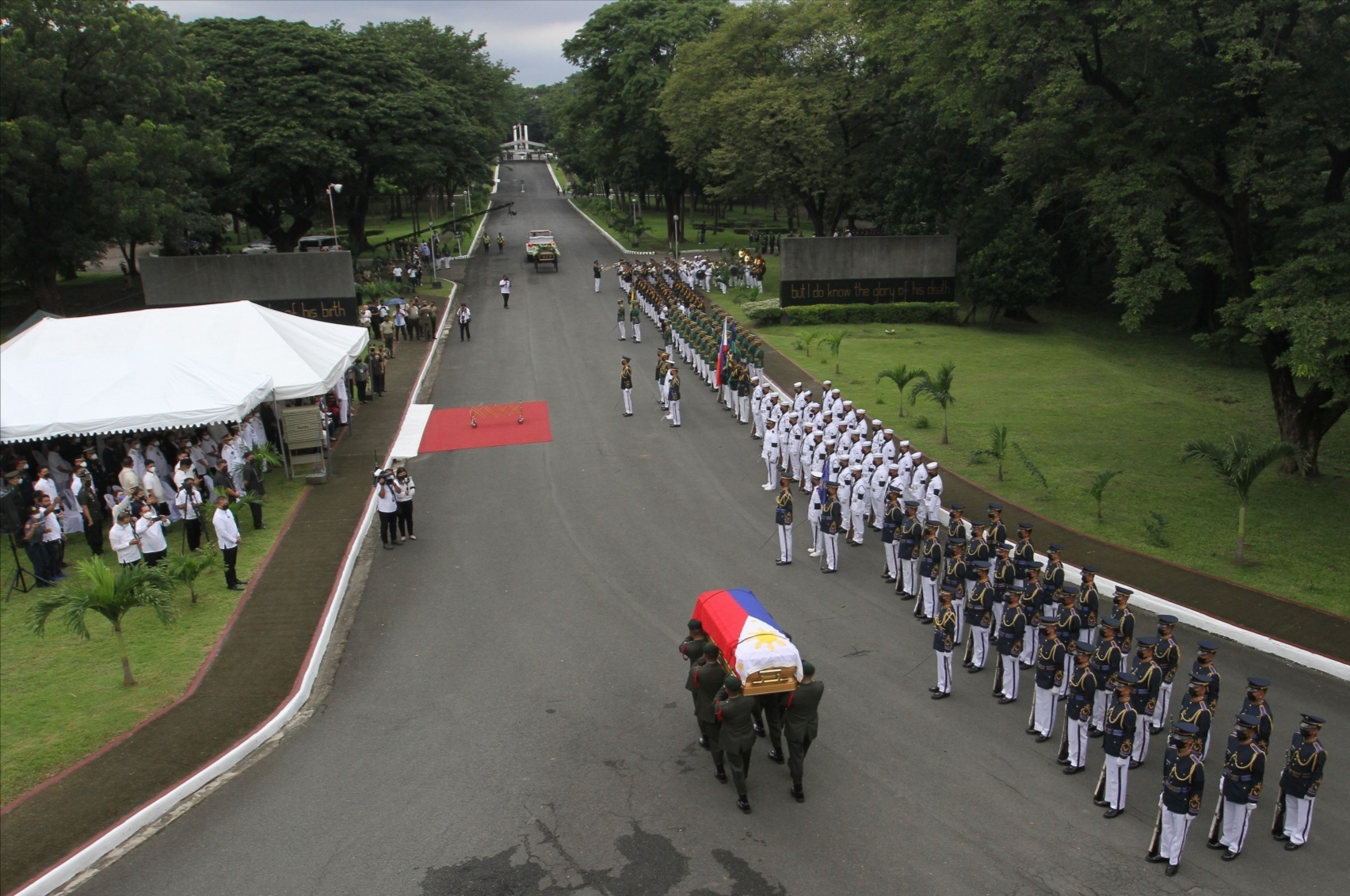
State funeral of Fidel V. Ramos at the Libingan ng mga Bayani in Taguig on August 9, 2022, the day of his burial.

On July 31, 2022, Ramos died from the complications of the COVID-19 Omicron variant at the Makati Medical Center in Makati, at the age of 94. According to the radio station DZRH and his family statement, he has been fully or triple vaccinated, but he compromised his immune system; he also had suffered from a heart condition. At the time of his death, he was the second longest living president in Philippine history, only behind Emilio Aguinaldo by 186 days. He was previously the oldest living president, a distinction he held from Diosdado Macapagal's death in 1997.

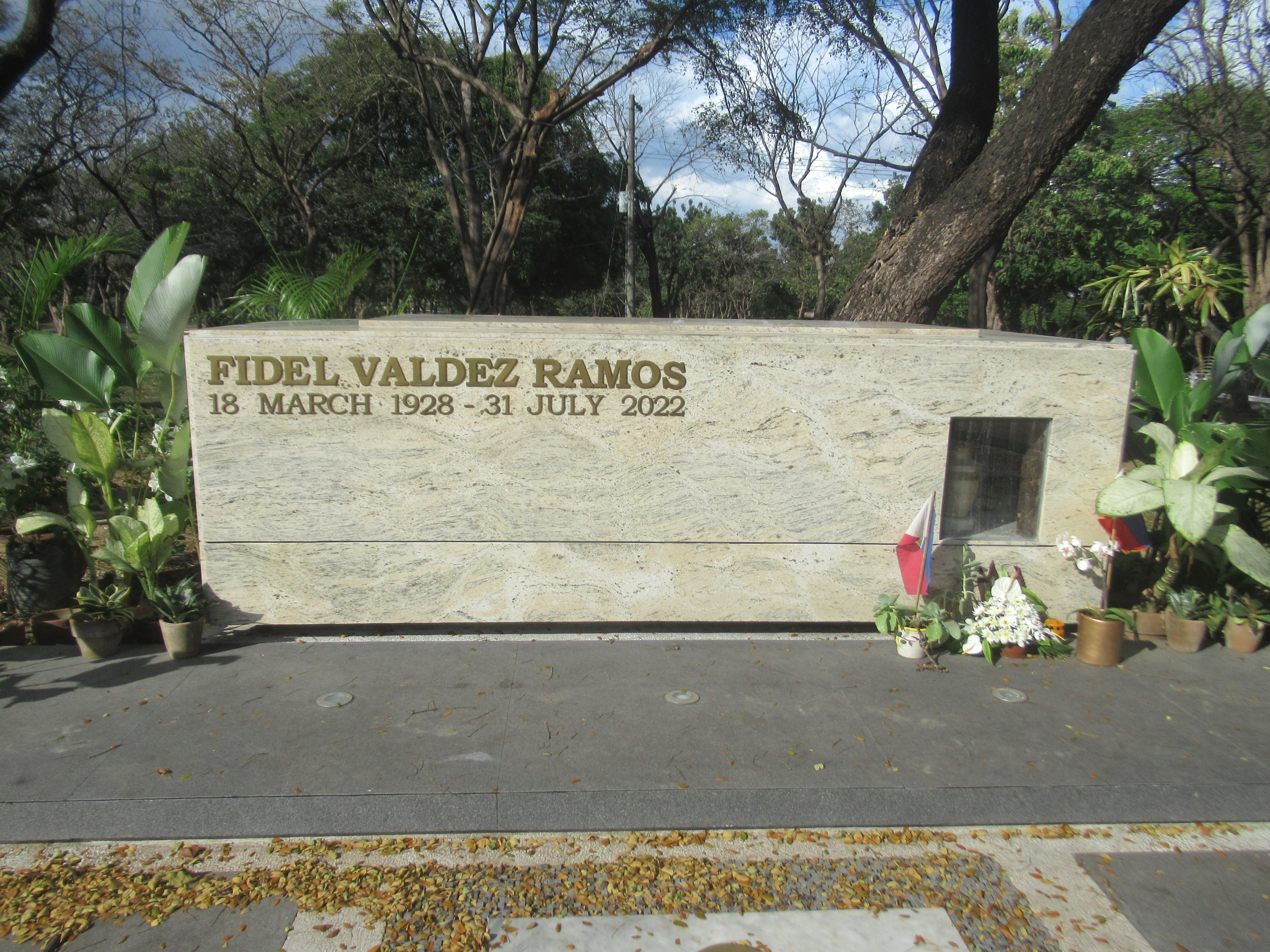
Ramos's grave at the Libingan ng mga Bayani

President Bongbong Marcos declared a nine-day period of "national mourning day" from July 31 to August 9, 2022, where all national flags were "flown at half-mast from sunrise to sunset" as a sign of mourning. Due prevailing policies about COVID-19 Omicron-related deaths in the country (during the Omicron time in the first 18-month period), Ramos' remains were cremated, which made him the second Philippine president to have been cremated before an initial burial after former President Benigno Aquino III in June 2021. His wake was held from August 4 to 8 at The Chapels at Heritage Park in Taguig. On August 9, he was accorded a state funeral, which was the first for a former Philippine president since Diosdado Macapagal. His remains were inurned at the Libingan ng mga Bayani between former presidents Elpidio Quirino and Ferdinand Marcos Sr.

== Approval ratings ==
SWS Net satisfaction ratings of Fidel V. Ramos (September 1992 – April 1998)
| Date | Rating |
|---|---|
| Sep 1992 | +66 |
| Dec 1992 | +60 |
| Apr 1993 | +66 |
| Jul 1993 | +69 |
| Sep 1993 | +62 |
| Dec 1993 | +65 |
| Apr 1994 | +67 |
| Aug 1994 | +55 |
| Nov 1994 | +49 |
| Dec 1994 | +50 |
| Mar 1995 | +24 |
| Jun 1995 | +26 |
| Oct 1995 | +1 |
| Dec 1995 | +2 |
| Apr 1996 | +17 |
| Jun 1996 | +19 |
| Sep 1996 | +21 |
| Dec 1996 | +24 |
| Apr 1997 | +50 |
| Jun 1997 | +49 |
| Sep 1997 | +35 |
| Dec 1997 | +40 |
| Jan 1998 | +13 |
| Feb 1998 | +20 |
| Mar 1998 | +15 |
| Mar–Apr 1998 | +30 |
| Apr 1998 | +19 |
| Average | +38 |

== Electoral history ==
Electoral history of Fidel V. Ramos
| Year | Office | Party | Votes received | | | | Result |
| Year | Office | Party | Total | % | P. | Swing | Result |
|---|---|---|---|---|---|---|---|
| 1992 | President of the Philippines | Lakas | 5,342,521 | 23.58% | 1st | —N/a | Won |

== Honors and decorations ==
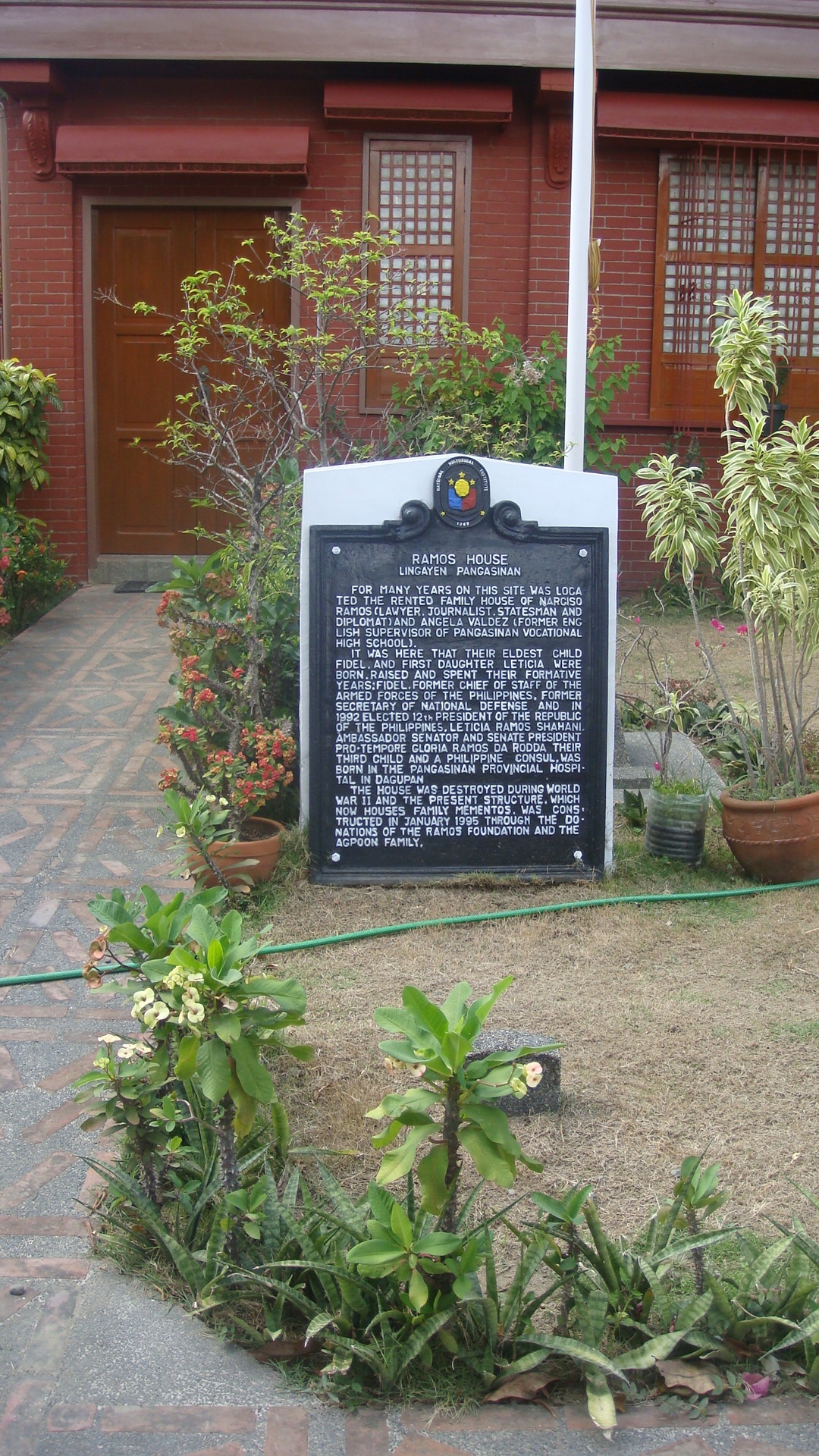
Ramos House marker

=== National Honors ===
- : Commander of the Philippine Legion of Honor, First Bronze Anahaw Leaf (November 27, 1986)
- : Commander of the Philippine Legion of Honor, Second Bronze Anahaw Leaf (March 18, 1988)
- : Commander of the Philippine Legion of Honor, Third Bronze Anahaw Leaf (July 19, 1991)
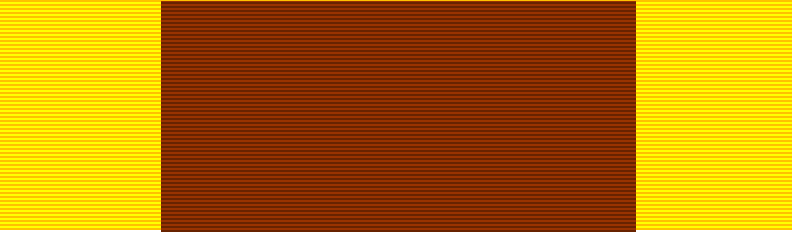
- : Knight Grand Cross of the Order of the Knights of Rizal.
- : Military Merit Medal with Spearhead (May 23, 1952)
- : Distinguished Service Star (May 20, 1966)
- : Distinguished Service Star, First Bronze Anahaw Leaf (December 20, 1967)
- : Military Commendation Medal (May 31, 1968)
- : Distinguished Service Star, First Silver Anahaw Leaf (August 3, 1981)
- : Outstanding Achievement Medal (July 29, 1983)
- : Distinguished Conduct Star (January 14, 1991)
- : AFP Long Service Medal
- Korean Campaign Medal
- Vietnam Service Medal
- Disaster Relief & Rehabilitation Operation Ribbon

=== Foreign Honors ===
- Brunei:
  - Honorary Member of The Most Esteemed Family Order of Brunei (March 5, 1988)
- Chile:
  - Collar of the Grand Cross of the Order of the Merit of Chile
- France:
  - Grand Cross of the Order of Legion of Honour
- Indonesia:
  - Grand Meritorious Military Order Star, 1st Class (June 20, 1989)
  - National Police Meritorious Service Star, 1st Class (June 17, 1974)
- Malaysia:
  - Honorary Recipient of the Order of the Crown of the Realm (1995)
- Pakistan:
  - Nishan-e-Pakistan (March 8, 1997)
- Panama:
  - Collar of the Order of Manuel Amador Guerrero (September 18, 1995)
- Peru:
  - Grand Cross of the Order of the Sun of Peru (1994)
- Spain:
  - Collar of the Order of Civil Merit (September 2, 1994)
  - Collar of the Order of Isabella the Catholic (March 24, 1995)
  - Collar of the Order of Charles III (January 30, 1998)
- South Korea:
  - Grand Order of Mugunghwa
  - : Cheonsu Medal, Order of National Security Merit
- Thailand:
  - Knight Grand Cordon of The Most Exalted Order of the White Elephant (January 29, 1997)
- United Nations:
  - : United Nations Korea Medal
- United Kingdom:
  - Honorary Knight Grand Cross of the Most Distinguished Order of St. Michael and St. George (1995)
- United States:
  - : Commander of the Legion of Merit (August 1, 1990)
  - : Vietnam Service Medal
  - : Korean Service Medal

=== Other awards ===
- Rizal Pro Patria Award (June 22, 1993)

=== International organizations ===
- Bronze Wolf Award (July 28, 1993)

== Legacy ==
=== FVR Legacy Initiative ===
The FVR Legacy Initiative is a digital platform that honors the life and leadership of President Fidel V. Ramos, the 12th President of the Philippines. It offers a rich archive of materials that span his early years, military service, presidency, and post-presidential contributions to peace and development. It is a commemorative and educational project dedicated to preserving and promoting the leadership principles, governance philosophy, and historical contributions of former Philippine President Fidel V. Ramos. It serves as a multi-platform archive and advocacy network that highlights Ramos’ role in shaping democratic governance, national development, and regional diplomacy during and beyond his presidency (1992–1998).

=== Fidel V. Ramos LEAD4R Fellowship Program ===
On March 18, 2024, the UP National College of Public Administration and Governance (UP NCPAG), in collaboration with the Management Association of the Philippines (MAP) and the FVR Legacy Initiative, launched the Fidel V. Ramos LEAD4R Fellowship Program. This executive education initiative is designed to honor the legacy of former President Fidel V. Ramos by promoting progressive governance and leadership principles.

The program is tailored for current and future leaders across government, civil society, and the private sector. Its core mission is to foster values such as collaboration, integrity, accountability, and inclusivity in pursuit of public sector reform and sustainable development. The University of the Philippines emphasized that the fellowship seeks to instill the enduring leadership model of President Ramos, who championed democratic values alongside economic growth. His administration is remembered for linking economic progress with democratic reform, both nationally and globally. Structured as a 10-month non-degree program, the fellowship is equivalent to six academic units at the master's level. It offers participants exposure to innovative governance practices from both local and international contexts.

Military offices
| Preceded by Eduardo M. Garcia | Chief of the Philippine Constabulary; 1980–1986 | Succeeded by Renato de Villa |
| Preceded by Fabian Ver | Chief of Staff of the Armed Forces of the Philippines; 1984–1985 | Succeeded by Fabian Ver |
| Preceded by Fabian Ver | Chief of Staff of the Armed Forces of the Philippines; 1986–1988 | Succeeded by Renato de Villa |
Political offices
| Preceded by Rafael Ileto | Secretary of National Defense; 1988–1991 | Succeeded by Renato de Villa |
| Preceded by Corazon Aquino | President of the Philippines; 1992–1998 | Succeeded by Joseph Estrada |
Party political offices
| New political party | Leader of Lakas–CMD; 1991–1998 | Succeeded by Gloria Macapagal Arroyo |
| First | Lakas–CMD nominee for President of the Philippines; 1992 | Succeeded by Jose de Venecia Jr. |
Diplomatic posts
| Preceded by Tomiichi Murayama | Chairperson of APEC; 1996 | Succeeded by Jean Chrétien |
