= Amelita Ramos =

First Lady of the Philippines from 1992 to 1998

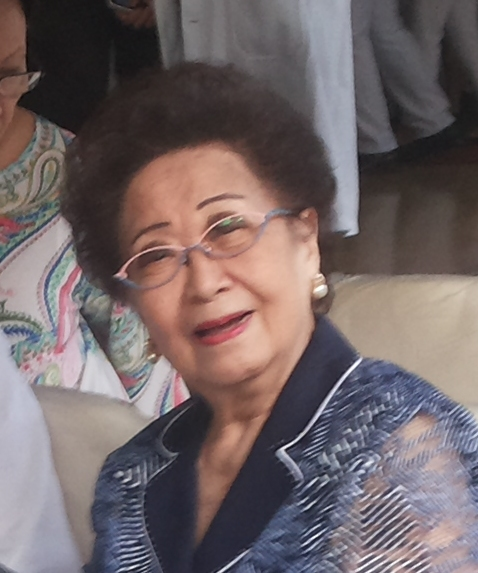
- Ramos in 2017

First Lady of the Philippines
- In role June 30, 1992 – June 30, 1998
- President: Fidel V. Ramos
- Preceded by: Imelda Marcos (1965)
- Succeeded by: Loi Ejercito

Personal details
- Born: Amelita Jara Martinez; December 29, 1926 (age 99) Philippine Islands
- Spouse: Fidel V. Ramos (m. 1954; died 2022)
- Children: Angelita; Josephine; Carolina; Cristina; Gloria
- Education: Boston University (BS); University of California, Los Angeles (MS)

Amelita "Ming" Jara Martinez-Ramos (born December 29, 1926) is a former First Lady of the Philippines. She is the widow of Fidel V. Ramos.

== Early life ==
Ramos was born Amelita Jara Martinez to Rufino Martinez and Josefa Jara Martinez, both from La Paz, Iloilo (now a district of Iloilo City). Her father was the country’s first US-trained naval architect, while her mother was the country’s pioneer social worker. She started playing badminton at the age of 16 and was then hired as clerk by the Metropolitan Water District (now Metropolitan Waterworks and Sewerage System).

== Education and career ==
Ramos completed her high school education at University of the Philippines (UP) High School (now UP Integrated School) in Manila. She later earned a Bachelor of Science degree in Physical Education from Boston University's Sargent School. She later earned Master of Science in Physical Education and Recreation from the University of California, Los Angeles. She became a national champion swimmer and badminton player. She then joined International School Manila in 1955, when its campus was then located in Pasay. There, she worked as secretary to the assistant headmaster, physical education teacher, director of testing, director of admissions, and registrar, respectively. She retired from ISM in 2022 as is its longest serving personnel.

== As First Lady ==
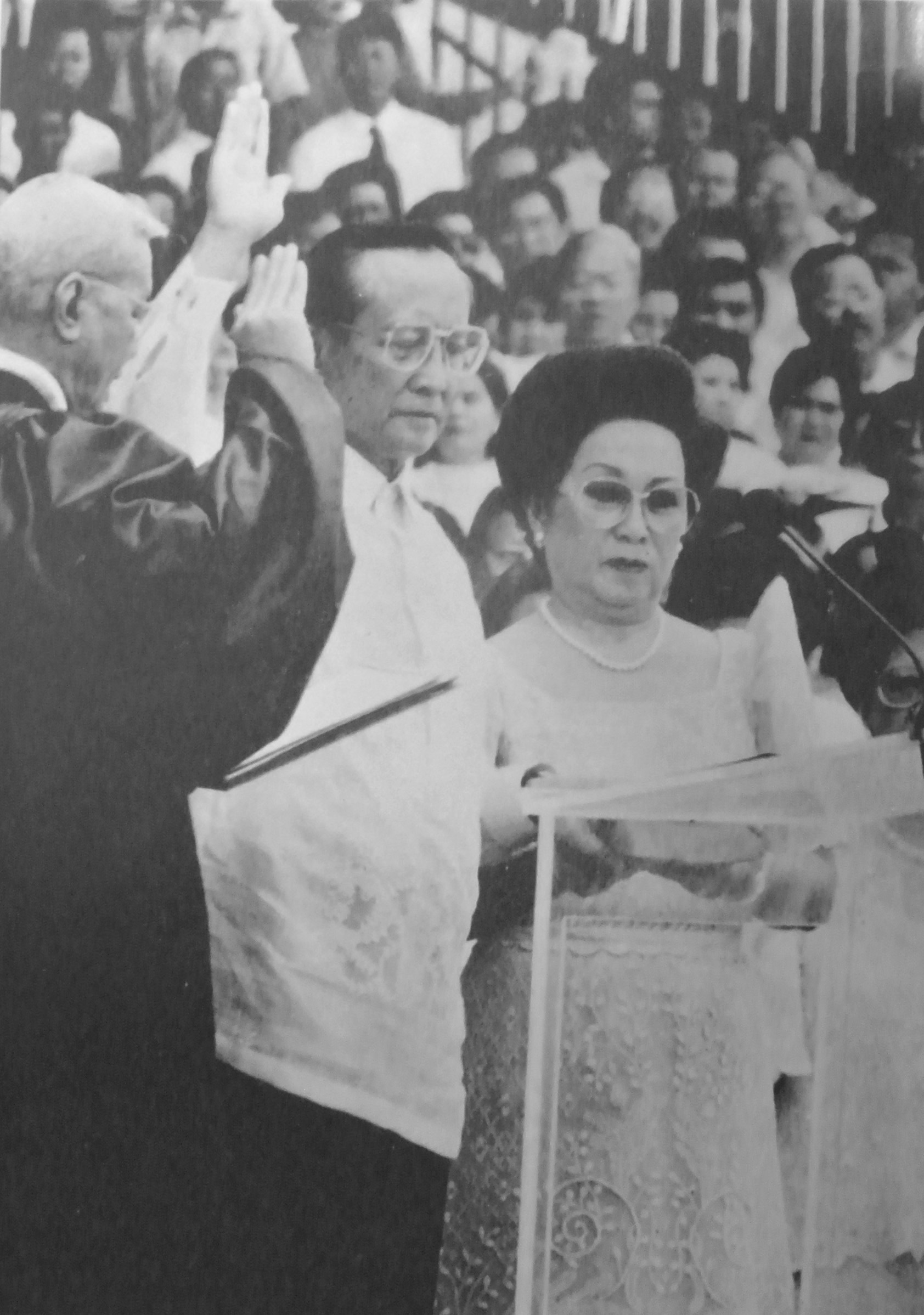
First Lady Ming Ramos (right) holding the Bible during her husband's oath-taking ceremony

In many ways, Ramos was a remarkable Presidential spouse, despite possessing a rather retiring character. Many past bearers of the title were homemakers, albeit as hostesses of Malacañang Palace; Ramos raised some eyebrows in conservative circles when, after her husband's accession following the 1992 elections, she refused to resign as the registrar of International School Manila, which was then located in Makati. Despite her new, exalted rank as consort to the head of state, she dutifully reported to the registrar's office much to the delight of female professionals.

She was a particularly visible advocate of sport, a field outside the traditional realm of First Ladies. An active sportswoman herself, she was most associated with badminton, having served as president of the Philippine Badminton Association. Her achievements in the environmental field are considerable as well, having campaigned for the rehabilitation and conservation of the Pasig River, which received prominent attention during her husband's rule. She continues to be active in efforts devoted to the Pasig.

In 1994, she led the development of the Orchidarium in Rizal Park, Manila, where an orchid named Ascocenda Amelita Ramos is named after her. She also established Ming’s Garden, a plant nursery and events venue in Silang, Cavite which also has a Filipino restaurant.

== Involvement in sports ==
Ramos was president of the Philippine Badminton Association from 1996 until 2011, when Jejomar Binay was elected as her successor. She remained in the organization as chairman emeritus until 2015.

== Personal life ==
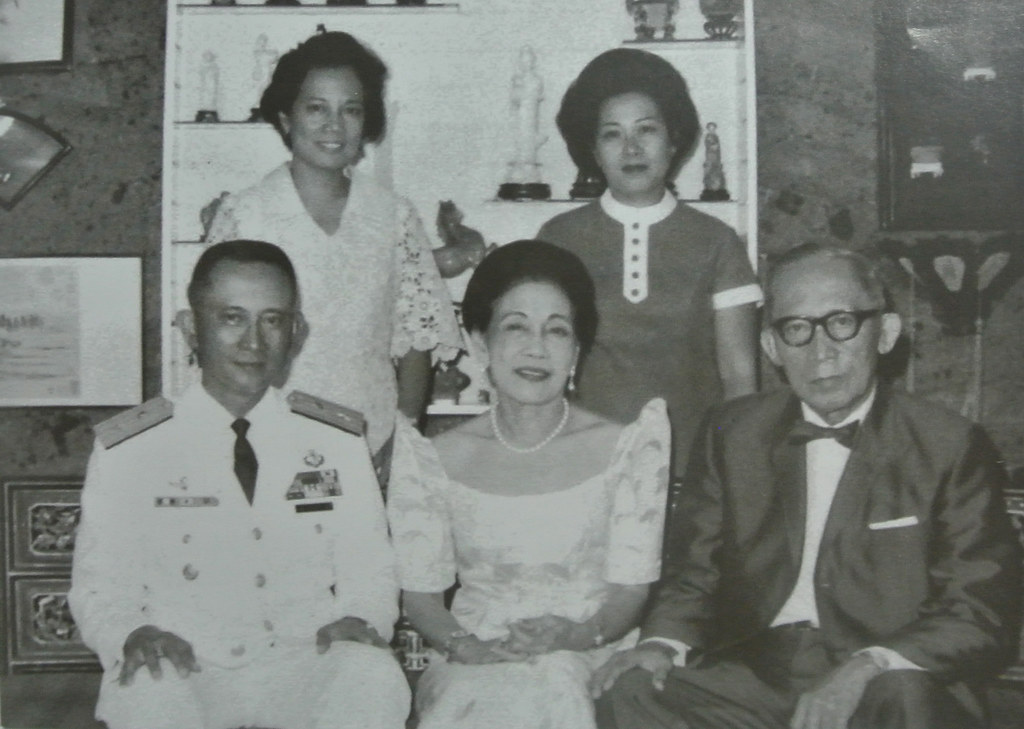
Amelita Ramos (right to the first row) and her husband Fidel Ramos (left to the second row) with his family

She married Fidel V. Ramos, who was then an army officer, on October 21, 1954, at the Central Church (now known as Central United Methodist Church) in Manila. They started as friends while they were classmates at the UP High School and neighbors at Padre Faura Street in Manila. Together, they have five daughters: Angelita Ramos-Jones, Josephine Ramos-Samartino, Carolina Ramos-Sembrano, Cristina Ramos-Jalasco, and Gloria Ramos. They also have eight grandsons and five granddaughters. He died on July 31, 2022, due to complications from COVID-19.

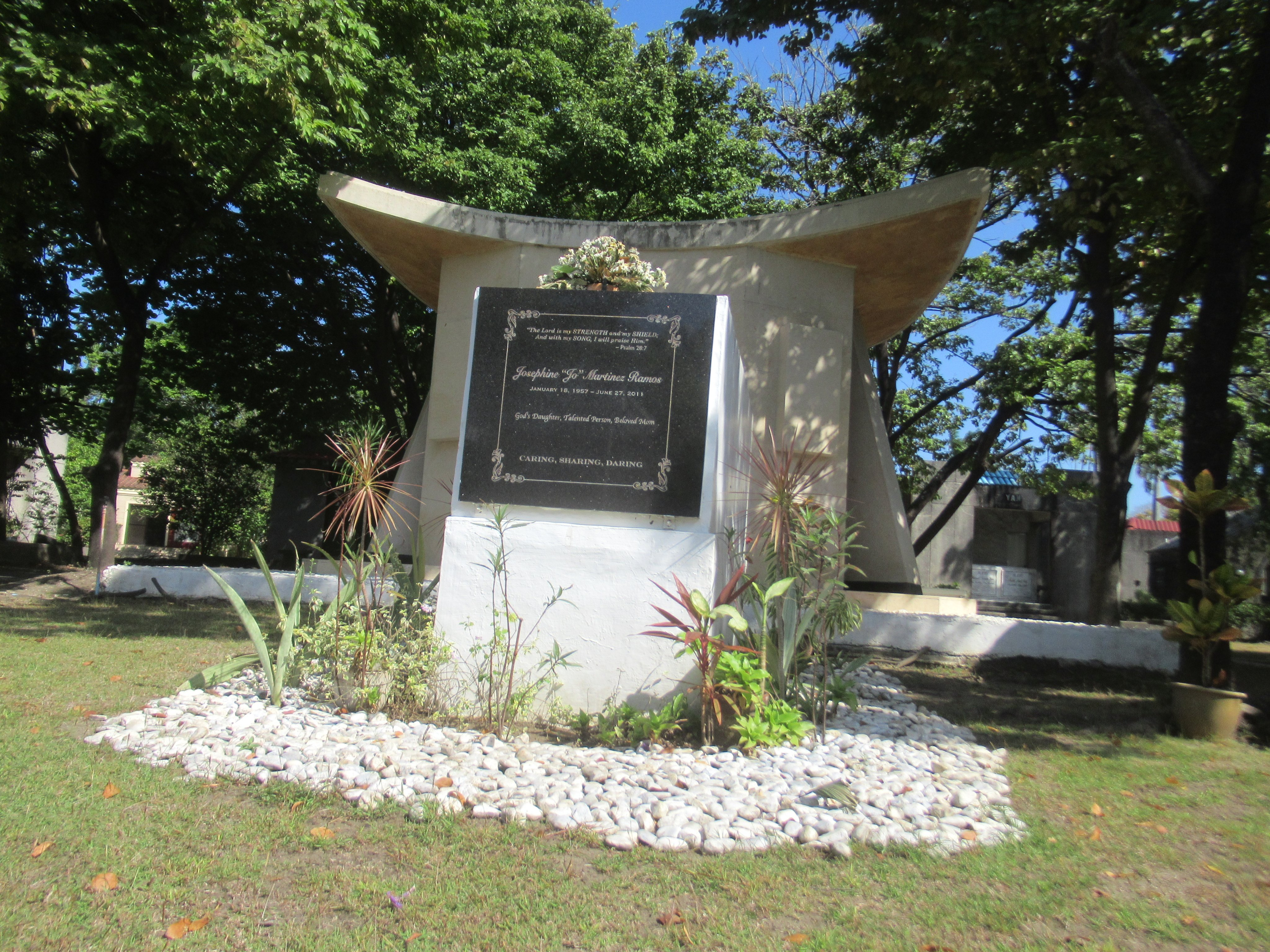
Josephine Ramos-Samartino's (daughter) grave at Manila Memorial Park – Sucat.

In the early hours of June 27, 2011, Ramos' daughter, Josephine, died due to lung cancer at the age of 54 at The Medical City in Pasig, Metro Manila. The former president admitted shortly after that Josephine, the second of their five daughters, was a smoker for 25 years who had only disclosed her illness to the family five weeks before her death.

Aside from being a sportswoman, Ramos is also recognized as a talented amateur pianist, performing on several occasions with the Executive Combo Band of Raul Manglapus.

== Honour ==
- Spain:
  - : Dame Grand Cross of the Order of Civil Merit (September 2, 1994)
  - : Dame Grand Cross of the Order of Isabella the Catholic (March 25, 1995)

Honorary titles
Vacant Title last held by Imelda Marcos	First Lady of the Philippines; 1992–1998	Succeeded by Loi Estrada
