= Cristina Ramos-Jalasco =

Association football player

7th President of the Philippine Olympic Committee
- In office 1997–1999
- Preceded by: Rene Cruz
- Succeeded by: Celso Dayrit

Personal details
- Born: Cristina Martinez Ramos
- Parent(s): Fidel V. Ramos; Amelita Martinez
Association football career
International career
Years	Team	Apps	(Gls)
1980–1986	Philippines		

Cristina Martinez Ramos-Jalasco is a sports executive and former international footballer.

== Sporting career ==
Ramos-Jalasco was the first President of the Philippine Ladies Football Association (PLFA) which was established in October 1980 in Baguio herself. The PLFA was later absorbed to the Philippine Football Federation.

She was a member of the Philippines national team from 1980 to 1986. She was the captain of the Edward Magallona-led squad at the 1981 AFC Women's Championship. She also led the team to a bronze medal finish at the 1985 Southeast Asian Games in the women's football event which was contested by only three teams.

She became involved in karate in 1992 and later became the Project Director of the Philippine Karate-do Federation.

Ramos-Jalasco was elected as the first female President of the Philippine Olympic Committee in November 1996 winning over her closest rival, Celso Dayrit by a single vote. She served the sports body from 1997 to 1999, when she was removed from the position following a leadership dispute. Her husband Godofredo Jalasco, then head of the Basketball Association of the Philippines was a part of an opposing faction which disputed her leadership.

By 2010, Ramos-Jalasco is involved with FIFA and the Asian Football Confederation as a committee member. She has also served as match commissioner since 2003 for various international football matches. She was the match commissioner of the 2010 FIFA U-20 Women's World Cup final between Germany and Nigeria.

== Personal life ==
Ramos–Jalasco is the fourth child among five daughters. of former Philippine President Fidel V. Ramos and Amelita Ramos. She has three children with her husband, Godofredo Jalasco.
