= Philippine Fencing Association =

Sports governing body in the Philippines

- Sport: Fencing
- Jurisdiction: Philippines
- Abbreviation: PFA
- Founded: 1957
- Affiliation: FIE
- Regional affiliation: FCA
- Headquarters: Pasig, Philippines
- President: Rene Gacuma

Official website
- philippinefencing.webs.com
- (Philippines)

The Philippine Fencing Association (PFA) is the governing body for the sport of fencing in the Philippines and is recognized by the Philippine Olympic Committee (POC) as one of its National Sports Association members. Founded by Don Francisco Dayrit Sr. as Philippine Amateur Fencers Association or PAFA, PFA is a member of the International Fencing Federation (FIE) and one of the founding members of the Southeast Asian Fencing Federation (SEAFF) and the Asian Fencing Confederation (AFC).
