= Francisco Dayrit Sr. =

Personal information
- Nickname: Don Paco
- Nationality: Filipino
- Born: Francisco Limjuco Dayrit; June 15, 1907
- Died: March 17, 1983 (aged 75)

Sport
- Country: Philippines
- Sport: Fencing
- Now coaching: -

Francisco "Paco" Limjuco Dayrit Sr. (June 15, 1907 – March 17, 1983) was a Filipino fencer and is dubbed as the Father of Philippine Fencing. He founded the then Philippine Amateur Fencers Association in the 1930s which was incorporated in 1957. He was instrumental in campaigning for the recognition of the sports body by the FIE. The sports body was recognized in 1967. He is one of the personalities included at the FIE Hall of Fame.

== Personal life ==
His son Celso (1951-2021), also a fencer, eventually became the president of the Philippine Olympic Committee, and later the Fencing Confederation of Asia until his death in 2021.
