= Fencing Confederation of Asia =

International body created in 1988

The Asian Fencing Confederation (AFC) or Fencing Confederation of Asia (FCA) is an international body created in 1988, charged with the promotion and development of fencing in Asia. It organises the Asian Fencing Championships annually, in all levels: seniors, juniors and cadet, under 23 and veterans.

Colonel Houshmand Almasi, President of the Iranian Fencing Federation, was the first president of the organisation.

== See also ==
- International Fencing Federation
- Asian Fencing Championships
