= Philippine Human Development Network =

The Human Development Network Foundation Inc. (HDN) is a non-stock, non-profit organization whose mission is to propagate and mainstream the concept of sustainable human development through research and advocacy.

The HDN is a group of development practitioners who first got together in 1992 through the initiative of Professor Solita Collas-Monsod, past HDN President, and the previous Resident Representative of the United Nations Development Programme (UNDP), Kevin McGrath. The group met in a series of "brainstorming" sessions to discuss how best to apply the major findings and conclusions of the Human Development Report in the Philippine setting. From an informal group in 1992, the HDN became a registered organization in 1997.

There are now about 150 HDN members from national government agencies, international organizations, non-governmental organizations and research institutions. In terms of discipline and background, the group is composed of political scientists, sociologists, and specialists in public administration, education and social work. The UNDP has been providing financial and technical assistance to the HDN for the preparation of the Philippine Human Development Reports and advocacy activities since 1994.

== Mission ==
HDN's mission is to build knowledge that will help strengthen institutional capacity in achieving human development outcomes primarily through research and advocacy. Projects and programs are conducted while in constant consultation and engagement with stakeholders from civil society, research and academic institutions around the country, and the Philippine government.

== Vision ==
HDN's vision is to build an environment for Filipinos where they can develop their full potential and lead productive, creative lives in accord with their needs and interests. Human development is about enabling people to have wider choices and expanding capabilities that will allow them to live a full life as human beings.

== Our Work ==
To promote the sustainable human development concept, the HDN spearheads the following projects and activities: (1) preparation of a Philippine Human Development Report on a regular basis; (2) conduct and publication of policy researches on human development issues; (3) monitoring of the achievements, breakthroughs, deficiencies and gaps regarding human development in the work of both government and non-government organizations, (4) organization of and participation in fora, dialogues and symposia on human development concerns; (5) provision of briefings, workshops, lectures and training sessions relating to human development concepts and measures to different audiences.

=== Philippine Human Development Report ===
The Philippine Human Development Report (PHDR) is the HDN's main vehicle for advocating people-centered development, and generating discussion and consensus on human development issues. It is the national counterpart of the United Nations Development Programme's Global Human Development Report. To date, the HDN has produced seven PHDRs—1994, 1997, 2000, 2002, 2005, 2008/2009, and 2012/2013 in partnership with the UNDP. It is currently preparing the eighth report to be published sometime 2015-2016.

=== Other Publications and Research Papers ===
Aside from the PHDR, the HDN has come out with publications and research papers that tackled specific human development concerns.

=== Sustainable Human Development (SHD) Fora ===
The HDN organizes dialogues and fora with the aim of institutionalizing and broadening the partnership between civil society and government in mainstreaming the human development framework in policy-making and programming.

=== Lectures, Workshops & Training Sessions ===
The HDN developed a training package on the concept of human development and the estimation of the Human Development Index for HDN Members and those engaged in policy decisions and in assessment of improvements in the quality of life using the Minimum Basic Needs approach and other summary measures.

== Philippine Human Development Reports ==
The Philippines has published seven national human development reports since 1994. These reports have acquired a reputation for factually based, insightful and well written analyses of human development issues in the Philippines. The PHDR is today a highly respected publication not just in the Philippines but also in the community of nations. In October 2000, at the conclusion of the Second General Forum on Human Development in Rio de Janeiro, Brazil, when the first annual National Human Development Report Awards Programme was launched, the PHDR 2000 was among the awardees. PHDR 2000 won awards in three categories: Excellence in the Innovative Use of Human Development Measurement Tools, Excellence in Presentation and Design, and Excellence in Participation and Policy Impact.

The issue of the Philippine Human Development Report in 1994 introduced to Philippine readers the concept of Human Development, explaining its difference from the more traditional measure of development like per capita income and the significance of measures of life expectation and literacy and education in the promotion of human development. For the first time, it computed the Human Development Index (HDI) for each of the country's regions and drew out policy implications of the index for action of national and regional authorities.

Succeeding issues dwelt on specific themes, defining and analyzing these and deriving policy suggestions from them. The 1997 issue highlighted the theme of Gender focusing on the enhancement of women's capabilities and opportunities to make choices. This report noted the significant gains attained by the Philippines in increasing women's access to education and jobs in certain sectors, and participation in elections as voters and candidates. The report of 2000 focused on Education. After documenting what is called an alarming decline in the quality of Philippine education it outlined a general framework for dealing with the problem. PHDR 2002 focused on Employment, more specifically on the nature of unemployment in the Philippines, the profile of the unemployed and quality of employment, and recommended ways and means of generating employment opportunities' to enable people to live in prosperity and dignity. PHDR 2005 probed into Peace and Human Security and examined the causes and costs of ideology-based armed conflicts, the shortcomings of the government’s policies and institutions and recommended ways to recast or reinforce the government’s peace efforts. PHDR 2008/2009 looked into Institutions and Politics by digging into some critical institutions such as the Civil Service Commission, the Department of Budget and the Department of Education (DepEd), and key judicial and quasi-judicial agencies.

The latest issue, PHDR 2012/2013 tackled the HDN’s most challenging issue to date, Geography and Human Development. The Report was launched on July 29, 2013. Each of these issues also came up with the latest computations of provincial HDI's.

=== Issues ===
- Geography and Human Development in the Philippines (2012/2013)
- Institution, Politics and Human Development (2008/2009)
- Peace, Human Security and Human Development in the Philippines (2005)
- Work and Well Being (2002)
- Quality, Relevance and Access in Basic Education (2000)
- Women and Gender in Development (1997)
- Human Development and People's Participation in Governance (1994)
