= 2021 PSA Annual Awards =

Annual awarding ceremony

- Date: March 27, 2021
- Location: Virtual setting TV5 Media Center, Mandaluyong
- Country: Philippines
- Hosted by: Gretchen Ho; Paolo del Rosario

Television/radio coverage
- Network: One Sports+

The 2021 San Miguel Corporation (SMC) - Philippine Sportswriters Association Annual Awards was an annual awarding ceremony honoring the top sports personalities (athletes, coaches - living and deceased, national sports associations & organizations) who made tremendous contribution to Philippine sports in the year 2020 despite the ongoing COVID-19 pandemic, the postponement and cancellation of major sports events in the country within the first months of the community quarantine and the resumption of sporting tournaments under the bubble setup.

The awards night was held on March 27, 2021. For the first time in the history of the awards and in time of the COVID-19 pandemic, this year's edition was staged via hybrid or virtual format, with most of the awardees, including those who reside and train overseas, hooked up online and the awards proper was conducted at the TV5 Media Center in Mandaluyong. The PSA Awards were aired via delayed telecast on One Sports+ Channel, the following day.

William "Butch" Ramirez, Chairperson of the Philippine Sports Commission, served as the guest speaker of the awards night.

The organizer, Philippine Sportswriters Association, under its president Eriberto "Tito" S. Talao of Manila Bulletin is considered as the country's oldest media organization, with membership consisting of sportswriters, section editors and columnists from various sports websites, newspapers and tabloids in the Philippines.

== Honor roll ==
=== Main awards ===
The following are the list of main awards of the event.

==== Athlete of the Year ====
For her back-to-back championship triumphs in the NEC Karuizawa Championship and the Nitori Ladies Golf Tournament of LPGA of Japan Tour last year, Fil-Japanese professional golfer Yuka Saso was named as the Athlete of the Year of the PSA.

This is the second time that Saso bagged the prestigious award, as she have won the same honors in the 2019 PSA Annual Awards, along with 2018 Asian Games gold medalists Bianca Pagdanganan and Lois Kaye Go of golf, Hidilyn Diaz of weightlifting and Margielyn Didal of skateboarding.

Award	Winner	Sport	References
Athlete of the Year	Yuka Saso	Golf	

==== Other major awardees ====
Here are the other major awards to be conferred in the Awards Night.

Award	Winner	Sport/Team/Recognition	References
Lifetime Achievement Award	Eduardo "Danding" Cojuangco (Posthumous)	Basketball (Long-time supporter of Philippine Basketball; patron of Northern Consolidated, San Miguel Corporation and DLSU Green Archers basketball teams)	
Lifetime Achievement Award	Jose "Joey" Romasanta	Volleyball (One-time Gintong Alay project director; former 1st vice president, Philippine Olympic Committee; former president, Philippine Karatedo Federation & Larong Volleyball sa Pilipinas, Inc.)	
Lifetime Achievement Award	Renauld "Sonny" Barrios	Basketball (Former commissioner, Philippine Basketball Association; executive director, Samahang Basketball ng Pilipinas)	
National Sports Association of the Year	Association of Boxing Alliances in the Philippines (ABAP)	Boxing (Bagging 4 2021 Tokyo Olympics berths for Boxing: Eumir Marcial, Irish Magno, Carlo Paalam & Nesthy Petecio)	
President's Award	Abraham "Bambol" Tolentino	Cycling (President, Philippine Olympic Committee and Integrated Cycling Federation of the Philippines)	
Executive of the Year	Willie Marcial	Basketball (Commissioner, Philippine Basketball Association)	
Chooks-to-Go Fan Favorite "Manok ng Bayan" Award	Manny Pacquiao	Boxing (8-Time World Boxing Champion, Philippine Senator & Philanthropist / For helping the countrymen affected by the COVID-19 pandemic)	
Special Recognition	Soldier-Athletes/Frontliners (i.e. Nikko Huelgas, Maria Claire Adorna, Jovelyn Gonzaga)	For their outstanding service and bravery to help the Filipinos in time of COVID-19 pandemic	

=== Major awardees ===
Sorted in alphabetical order (based on their surnames).

Winner	Sport/Team/Recognition	References
Johnriel Casimero	Professional Boxing (WBO Bantamweight Champion)	
Alex Eala	Tennis (2020 Australian Open Junior Girls Doubles Titlist)	
Pedro Taduran	Professional Boxing (Former IBF Minimumweight Champion)	

=== Citations ===
Sorted in alphabetical order (based on their surnames).

Winner	Sport/Team/Recognition	References
Chooks-to-Go Pilipinas 3x3	Basketball (For successfully holding the bubble tournament)	
James de los Santos	Karate (Winning 48 (as of March 2021) gold medals in e-Kata international competitions)	
Hidilyn Diaz	Weightlifting (Gold Medalist, 2020 Roma Weightlifting World Cup)	
Margielyn Didal	Skateboarding (Gold Medalist, Asian Skateboarding Championships 2020 Online Skate Lockdown Video Competition & Silver Medalist, 2020 Madrid Urban Sports Virtual Tournament)	
Christine Organiza-Hallasgo	Athletics (Marathon) (Champion, 2020 Milo Marathon National Finals)	
Kristina Knott	Athletics (Sprint) (Philippine Record Holder, 100-meter and 200-meter dash)	
Irish Magno	Boxing (First Filipina Boxing Olympian, 2021 Tokyo Olympics)	
Eumir Felix Marcial	Boxing (Boxing Olympian, 2021 Tokyo Olympics & Professional Boxer)	
William Morrison	Athletics (Shot Put) (Gold Medalist, 2019 Southeast Asian Games)	
National Basketball League-Philippines	Basketball (For successfully holding the bubble tournament)	
Ernest Obiena	Athletics (Pole Vault) (Athletics Olympian, 2021 Tokyo Olympics & Gold Medalist, 59th Ostrava Golden Spike Tournament)	
George Luis Oconer	Cycling (Individual Champion, 2020 Ronda Pilipinas)	
Motic Panugalinog	Skateboarding (Gold Medalist, Asian Skateboarding Championships 2020 Online Skate Lockdown Video Competition)	
Philippine Basketball Association	Basketball (For successfully holding the bubble tournament)	
Philippines Football League	Football (For successfully holding the bubble tournament)	
Philippine Navy-Standard Insurance Team	Cycling (Team Champion, 2020 Ronda Pilipinas)	
Vanessa Sarno	Weightlifting (Gold Medalist, 2020 IWF Online World Cup)	
Sander Severino	Para Chess (Champion, 2020 IPDCA Online World Chess Championship)	
Sydney Sy-Tancontian	Sambo (Bronze Medalist, 2020 World Sambo Championships)	
Natalie Uy	Athletics (Pole Vault) (Philippine Record Holder, Women's Pole Vault)	

=== Posthumous Honors ===
The following recognitions, will be bestowed upon former national & collegiate athletes, officials and sports personalities who died in 2020. They will be honor with a short audio-video presentation and a one-minute moment of silence.

Winner	Sport/Team/Recognition	Date of death	References
Albert Almendralejo	Basketball/Football (Documentarist and Supporter of Philippine Football & San Beda University Basketball Team)	August 7	
Salvador "Buddy" Andrada	Tennis (Former President, Philippine Tennis Association)	April 8	
Jomar Ang	Karting (Former Member, Ateneo Judo Team & Champion Karter)	April 8	
Alyana Bautista	Football (Recruited Member, Ateneo Football Team)	July 23	
Oscar "Dodong" Bascon	Basketball (Former Team Manager, Negros Slashers)	July 22	
Orlando Bauzon	Basketball (Basketball Olympian, 1968 Summer Olympics)	September 5	
WIM Arianne Caoili	Chess (Filipino-Australian Chess Champion)	March 30	
Eduardo "Danding" Cojuangco	Basketball (Former Chairman, San Miguel Corporation)	June 16	
Sudan Daniel	Basketball (Most Valuable Player, NCAA Season 86 Men's Basketball - San Beda Red Lions)	December 26	
Vangie de Jesus	Volleyball (Former Team Captain, Philippines national women's volleyball team in 1977, 1979 and 1981 Southeast Asian Games)	November 21	
Aric Del Rosario	Basketball (Former Head Coach, UST Growling Tigers Men's Basketball Team)	March 25	
Rudy del Rosario	Football (Former Team Captain, Philippine Azkals and Founder, Kaya F.C.–Iloilo)	November 20	
Ronald Dulay	Volleyball (Former Assistant Coach, Philippines national women's volleyball team in 2005 Southeast Asian Games)	August 3	
Laura Elorde	Boxing (Widow of Filipino Boxing Champion Gabriel "Flash" Elorde)	May 3	
Maui Huelar	Basketball (Former Player, Negros Slashers)	April 16	
Celestina Beatrice Luna	Football (Member, Philippines under-15 girls football team)	May 26	
Nic Jorge	Basketball (Former Head Coach, Philippines national men's basketball team and Founder, Milo Best Center)	June 13	
Alexander Lim	Bowling (Treasurer & Board of Trustee, Philippine Bowling Federation)	April 1	
Alfonso "Boy" Marquez	Basketball (Basketball Olympian, 1968 Summer Olympics)	April 15	
Teddyvic Melendres	Sportswriting (Former Sports Editor, Philippine Daily Inquirer & Former President, Philippine Sportswriters Association)	December 26	
Junel Mendiola	Basketball (Former Player, Purefoods T.J. Hotdogs)	June 16	
Rico Navarro	Basketball/Sportswriting (Regional Director for Central Visayas, Samahang Basketball ng Pilipinas & Sports Columnist, The Freeman)	October 27	
Oliver Ongtawco	Bowling (Champion, 1978 FIQ World Tenpin Bowling Championships)	June 8	
Gene Poliarco	Chess (Long-time Filipino International Chess Arbiter)	April 5	
Iñaki Vicente	Football (Former Member, Philippines men's national football team)	January 9	
Josie Veguillas	Ice skating (President, Philippine Skating Union)	November 2	
Domingo "Coach Waray" Villanueva	Cycling (Cycling Olympian, 1988 & 1992 Summer Olympics)	April 7	
Randy Villanueva	Tennis (Former Vice President, Philippine Tennis Association)	October 27	

== See also ==
- 2020 in Philippine sports
