= 2023 PSA Annual Awards =

Annual athletic award

- Date: March 6, 2023
- Location: Diamond Hotel, Manila
- Country: Philippines
- Hosted by: Sev Sarmenta; Rizza Diaz

Television/radio coverage
- Network: Cignal TV

The 2023 San Miguel Corporation (SMC) - Philippine Sportswriters Association (PSA) Annual Awards was an annual awarding ceremony honoring the individuals (athletes, teams, officials and organizations) that made a significant impact on Philippine sports in 2022.

The awarding ceremony was held at the March 6, 2023, at the Grand Ballroom of the Diamond Hotel in Manila. More than 100 sports personalities and entities will be bestowed in the awarding ceremony, highlighted by the crowing of Athlete of the Year to World Championships gold medalist Hidilyn Diaz.

Philippine Sports Commission Chairman Richard "Dickie" Bachmann and Philippine Olympic Committee President Abraham "Bambol" Tolentino has been invited to witness the affair, while Project: Gintong Alay Director and Laoag, Ilocos Norte Mayor Michael Marcos Keon will serve as a guest speaker.

The PSA, currently headed by its president, Rey Lachica, sports editor of Tempo, is the oldest Philippine-based media group established in 1949 and the membership is composed of sportswriters, sports reporters, sports editors, columnists from the Philippine-based broadsheets, tabloids, online sports websites, and broadcast media.

== Honor roll ==
=== Main awards ===
The following are the list of main awards of the event.

==== Athlete of the Year ====
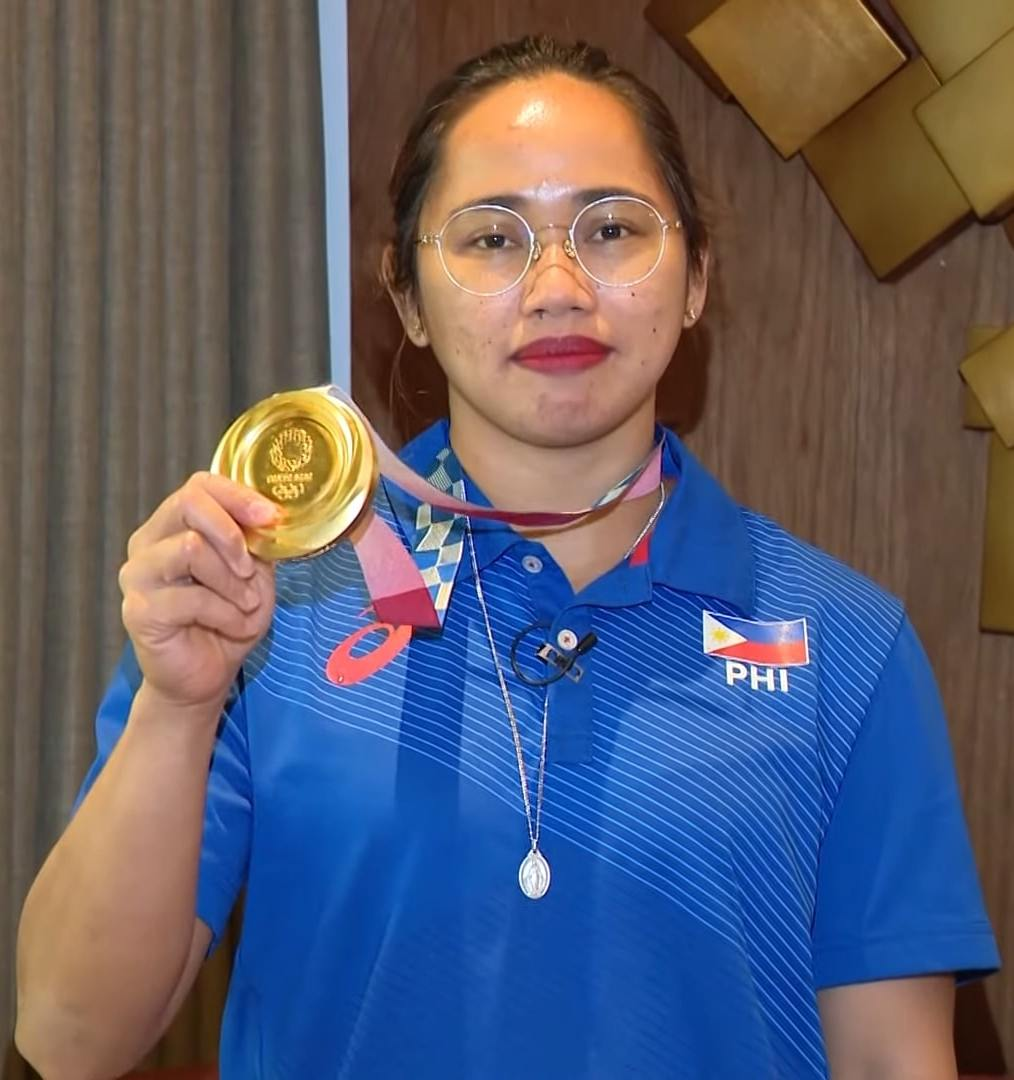
Weightlifter Hidilyn Diaz with her 2020 Summer Olympics gold medal.

This year's PSA Awards will highlight the recognition of the PSA Athlete of the Year to Hidilyn Diaz, who won her second straight Athlete of the Year accolade and fourth overall title (2016, 2018, 2021) anew.

The PSA unanimously voted Diaz for the Athlete of the Year award after she notched a triple gold medal sweep in the women's 55 kg category at the 2022 World Weightlifting Championships held in Bogotá, Colombia in December 5–16, 2022.

Her triple gold medal win completes Diaz's gold medal collection including the gold in the 2020 Summer Olympics, Southeast Asian Games, Asian Weightlifting Championships and Asian Games.

Award	Winner	Sport	References
Athlete of the Year	Hidilyn Diaz	Weightlifting	

==== Main awardees ====
Award	Winner	Sport/Team/Recognition	References
President's Award	Alex Eala	Tennis (2022 US Open Juniors Champion)	
Hall of Fame Award	Lydia de Vega	Athletics (Sprint) (Known as the Asia's Sprint Queen, 1982 and 1986 Asian Games gold medalist)	
Lifetime Achievement Award	Elma Muros	Athletics (Long Jump) (Known as the Philippines' long jump queen, 1984 Summer Olympics delegate, 15-time Southeast Asian Games gold medalist)	
National Sports Association of the Year	Samahang Weightlifting ng Pilipinas	Weightlifting (Local governing body for weightlifting; responsible for three gold medal finish of Hidilyn Diaz in the 2022 World Weightlifting Championships)	
Executive of the Year	Abraham Tolentino	Philippine sports (Philippine Olympic Committee and Integrated Cycling Federation of the Philippines (PHILCYCLING) President)	
Mr. Basketball	Scottie Thompson	Basketball (FIBA Asia Player of the Year and 2022–23 PBA Commissioner's Cup Best Player of the Conference for Barangay Ginebra San Miguel)	
Ms. Football	Sarina Bolden	Football (Western Sydney Wanderers and Philippines women's national football team midfielder)	
PSA Special Award	Joe Antonio; Ernie Gonzales	Sportswriting (Veteran sports editors who died in 2022)	
Lifetime Award in Sports Journalism	Eddie Alinea; Percy Dello; Jun Engracia; Ding Marcelo; Al Mendoza; Recah Trinidad	Sportswriting (Veteran and retired sportswriters and sports editors)	
Milo Champion of Grit and Glory Award	Hidilyn Diaz	Weightlifting (Gold Medalist, 2022 IWF World Championships)	

==== Major awardees ====
Winner	Sport/Team/Recognition	References
Rubilen Amit	Billiards (Champion, 2022 Predator World 10-Ball Championships)	
Carlo Biado	Billiards (Champion, 2022 Predator World 10-Ball Championships)	
Blacklist International	ESports (Mobile Legends: Bang Bang) (Gold Medalist, 2021 Southeast Asian Games and Champion, MPL Philippines Season 10)	
Boss Emong; Owner: Kennedy Morales and Edward Vincent Diokno Eje; Trainer: Ernesto Roxas; Breeder: Antonio Tan, Jr. Jockey: Jeffril Zarate	Horse racing (Horse of the Year) (Champion, 2022 Philippine Racing Commission Commissioner's Cup)	
Johann Chua	Billiards (Champion, 2022 Predator World 10-Ball Championships)	
Kimberly Anne Custodio	Jiu-jitsu (Champion, 2022 JJIF Jiu-Jitsu World Championships)	
"Filipinas" (Philippines women's national football team)	Football (Semifinalist, 2022 AFC Women's Asian Cup and one of the qualified teams for the 2023 FIFA Women's World Cup)	
Jovelyn Gonzaga	Beach Volleyball (Gold Medalist, 2022 Volleyball Beach World Pro Tour Futures Subic)	
Jesse Basilio Guce	Horse racing (Jockey of the Year) (Jockey with the most number of wins in 2022)	
Ernest Obiena	Athletics (Pole vault) (Bronze Medalist, 2022 World Athletics Championships and Philippine National Record Holder)	
Margarita "Meggie" Ochoa	Jiu-jitsu (Champion, 2022 JJIF Jiu-Jitsu World Championships)	
Carlo Paalam	Boxing (Gold Medalist, 2022 Asian Amateur Boxing Championships)	
Sisi Rondina	Beach Volleyball (Gold Medalist, 2022 Volleyball Beach World Pro Tour Futures Subic)	
Vanessa Sarno	Weightlifting (Gold Medalist, 2021 Southeast Asian Games and 2022 Asian Junior Weightlifting Championships)	
Junna Tsukii	Karate (Gold Medalist, 2022 World Games)	
Carlos Yulo	Gymnastics) (Gold Medalist, 2021 Southeast Asian Games and Silver and Bronze Medalist, 2022 World Artistic Gymnastics Championships)	

==== Citations ====
===== 2021 Southeast Asian Games gold medalists =====
These are the gold medalists from the 2021 Southeast Asian Games in Hanoi, Vietnam who will receive the citations from the PSA. Other gold medalists who have received another award will not be included.

- Kurt Barbosa (Taekwondo)
- Pia Bidaure, Abby Bidaure and Phoebe Amistoso (Archery)
- Clinton Bautista (Athletics - Hurdles)
- Ian Clark Bautista (Boxing)
- Islay Erika Bomogao and Richein Yozorez (Muay Thai)
- Fernando Casares (Triathlon)
- Eric Cray (Athletics - Hurdles)
- Samantha Catantan (Fencing)
- Phillip Delarmino (Muay Thai)
- Aleah Finnegan (Gymnastics)
- Jack Escarpe (Kurash)
- Rena Furukawa (Judo)
- Treat Huey and Ruben Gonzales (Tennis)
- Gina Iniong (Kickboxing)
- Chloe Isleta (Swimming)
- Rogen Ladon (Boxing)
- Kim Mangrobang (Triathlon)
- Eumir Marcial (Boxing)
- William Morrison (Athletics - Shot Put)
- Shugen Nakano (Judo)
- Jocel Ninobla (Taekwondo)
- Francine Padios (Pencak Silat)
- Annie Ramirez (Jiu-Jitsu)
- Kayla Richardson (Athletics - Dash)
- Jean Claude Saclag (Kickboxing)
- Merwin Tan (Bowling)
- Agatha Wong (Wushu)
- Philippine women's artistic gymnastics team
  - Aleah Finnegan, Chiara Andrew, Charlie Manzano, Lucia Gutierrez, Kursten Lopez, Ma. Cristina Onofre-Loberanes
- Philippine dancesport team
  - Sean Aranar and Ana Nualla, Angelo Marquez and Stephanie Sabalo, Mark Gayon and Joy Renigen
- Philippine men's bowling team
  - Ivan Dychangco, Ivan Malig, Merwin Tan, Patrick Nuqui
- Philippine women's League of Legends: Wildrift team
  - Charize "Yugen" Doble, Giana "Jeeya" Llanes, Angel "Angelailaila" Lozada, Christine "Rayray" Navidad, Rose Ann "Hell Girl" Robles, April "Aeae" Sotto
- Philippine Mobile Legends: Bang Bang team
  - Kyle Dominic "Dominic" Soto, Danerie James "Wise" Del Rosario, Salic Alauya "Hadji" Imam, Lee Howard "Owl" Gonzales, Johnmar "OhMyV33NUS" Villaluna, Dexter Louise Cruz "Dexstar" Alaba, Russel Aaron "Eyon" Usi
- Philippine women's basketball team
  - Mai-loni Henson, Afril Bernardino, Janine Pontejos, Clare Castro, Khate Castillo, Ella Fajardo, Chack Cabinbin, Andrea Tongco, Gemma Miranda, Camille Clarin, Angel Surada, Kristine Cayabyab, Katrina Guytingco, Mikka Cacho, Karl Ann Pingol, Monique del Carmen

===== Others =====
Winner	Sport/Team/Recognition	References
Sandi Menchi-Abahan	Obstacle course racing (Guinness World Record Holder and Champion, 2022 Altitude OCR World Championships Mount Everest)	
Dottie Ardina	Golf (Champion, 2022 Copper Rock Championships)	
IM Efren Bagamasbad	Chess (Champion in the 65-and-over Category, 2022 Asian Seniors Chess Championships)	
Bases Conversion and Development Authority (New Clark City)	Sports venues management	
Chezka Centeno	Billiards (Champion, 2022 APF Asian Women's 9-Ball Championships)	
Kaizen dela Serna	Obstacle course racing (Guinness World Record Holder for the Fastest 100-Meter Obstacle Course Race in Competition)	
Letran Knights	Basketball (Champion, NCAA Season 98 Basketball Tournament)	
Ronald Lomotos	Cycling (Individual Champion, 2022 Ronda Pilipinas)	
Andrico Mahilum	Obstacle course racing (Guinness World Record Holder and Champion, 2022 Altitude OCR World Championships Mount Everest)	
Rianne Malixi	Golf (Champion, 2022 Thailand Junior World Golf Championships)	
Philippine National Volleyball Federation	Volleyball	
Philippine Navy-Standard Insurance	Cycling (Team Champion, 2022 Ronda Pilipinas)	
Philippine Pencak Silat Team	Pencak Silat (Won 11 medals at the 2022 Asian Pencak Silat Championships and 6 medals in the 2021 Southeast Asian Games)	
Joyce Gail Reboton	Powerlifting (Triple Bronze Medalist, 2022 World Open Equipped Powerlifting Championships and 3 Gold and 1 Silver Medalist, 2022 Asian Classic Powerlifting Championships)	
Mark Julius Rodelas	Obstacle course racing (Guinness World Record Holder for the Fastest 100-Meter Obstacle Course Race in Competition)	
WIM Marie Antoniette San Diego	Chess (Champion, 2022 National Women's Chess Championships)	

==== Tony Siddayao Awards for Junior Athletes and Milo Junior Athletes of the Year ====
The award, which is named after Tony Siddayao (deceased, former sports editor of Manila Standard) is given out to outstanding junior national athletes aged 17 and below.

The awardees will also brought home the Junior Athletes of the Year award and medals from Milo Philippines.

Winner	Sport/Team/Recognition	References
Aleia Aielle Aguilar	Jiu-Jitsu (Champion, 2022 Abu Dhabi World Jiu-Jitsu Festival)	
Miguel Carlos	Archery (Gold Medalist, 2022 Batang Pinoy National Championships)	
Robert Dayanan, Jr.	Karate (Gold Medalist, 2022 Batang Pinoy National Championships)	
William John Riley Go	Karting (Champion, 2022 Super ROK Lonato, Italy)	
Micaela Jasmine Mojdeh	Swimming (Gold Medalist, 2022 PSI National Open Swimming Championships and 2022 Philippine National Age-Group Championships)	
Philippine Junior Chess Team	Chess (Overall Champion with 32 gold medals, 27 silver medals, and 21 bronze medals, 6th Annual Eastern Asia Youth Chess Championships)	
Helena Dominique So	Karate (Gold Medalist, 2022 Batang Pinoy National Championships)	
Elaiza Yulo	Gymnastics (Gold Medalist, 2022 JRC All-Stars Artistic Gymnastics Championships)	
Eldrew Yulo	Gymnastics (Gold Medalist, 2022 JRC All-Stars Artistic Gymnastics Championships)	

==== Posthumous honors ====
The PSA, will offer a tribute to the sports personalities who died in 2022 through a one minute of silent prayer.

- Raul Alcoseba (Basketball)
- Joe Antonio (Sportswriting)
- Malou Aquino-Manuel (Sportswriting)
- Jacinto Chua (Basketball)
- Rudy Fernandez (Para-Triathlon)
- Ernie Gonzales (Sportswriting)
- Dick Ildefonso (Sportscasting)
- Lydia de Vega-Mercado (Athletics)
- Valerio Lopez (Basketball)
- Peter Paul Patrick Lucas (Sportscasting)
- Cyrus Mann (Basketball)
- Zaldy Perez (Sportswriting)
- Adriano "Dong" Polistico (Basketball)
- Maoi Roca (Basketball)
- Boyet Sison (Sportscasting)
- Eric Suguitan (Basketball)
- Johanna Uy (Underwater Hockey)

== See also ==
- 2022 in Philippine sports
