= PSA Athlete of the Year =

Sports award

- Country: Philippines
- Presented by: Philippine Sportswriters Association
- Currently held by: Carlos Yulo and Alex Eala (2025)

The PSA Athlete of the Year is an annual award given by the Philippine Sportswriters Association to the best Filipino athletes for their sporting contributions and achievement. It is part of the PSA's Annual Awards Night, one of the most prestigious sport-related awards in the Philippines.

Notable athletes who have been given this award include Rafael Nepomuceno, Bong Coo, Eric Buhain, Lydia de Vega, Efren Reyes, Manny Pacquiao, Hidilyn Diaz, Carlos Yulo, EJ Obiena and Alex Eala.

== Winners ==
=== Per year ===
| Year | Winner | Sport |
|---|---|---|
| 1976 | Rafael "Paeng" Nepomuceno | Bowling |
| 1977- 1979 | Not awarded | —N/a |
| 1980 | Rafael "Paeng" Nepomuceno | Bowling |
| 1981 | Not awarded | —N/a |
| 1982 | Lydia de Vega | Track and Field |
| 1983 | Frank Cedeño | Professional Boxing |
| 1983 | Bong Coo | Bowling |
| 1984 | Rafael "Paeng" Nepomuceno | Bowling |
| 1984 | Dodie Boy Peñalosa | Professional Boxing |
| 1985 | Dodie Boy Peñalosa | Professional Boxing |
| 1985 | Joann Chan | Archery |
| 1986 | Ramon Brobio | Golf |
| 1986 | Lydia de Vega | Track and Field |
| 1986 | Bong Coo | Bowling |
| 1987 | Lydia de Vega | Track and Field |
| 1987 | Eric Buhain | Swimming |
| 1988 | Leopoldo Serrantes | Amateur Boxing |
| 1988 | Arianne Cerdeña | Bowling |
| 1989 | Luisito Espinosa | Professional Boxing |
| 1990 | Frankie Miñoza | Golf |
| 1990 | Luisito Espinosa | Professional Boxing |
| 1990 | Roberto Jalnaiz | Amateur Boxing |
| 1991 | Eric Buhain | Swimming |
| 1992 | Rafael "Paeng" Nepomuceno | Bowling |
| 1993 | Elma Muros | Track and Field |
| 1994 | Mansueto "Onyok" Velasco | Amateur Boxing |
| 1994 | Elias Recaido | Amateur Boxing |
| 1994 | Reynaldo Gallido | Amateur Boxing |
| 1995 | Elma Muros | Track and Field |
| 1996 | Rafael "Paeng" Nepomuceno | Bowling |
| 1997 | Pia Adelle Reyes | Gymnastics |
| 1997 | Gerry Peñalosa | Professional Boxing |
| 1998 | Frankie Miñoza | Golf |
| 1998 | Luisito Espinosa | Professional Boxing |
| 1999 | Efren "Bata" Reyes | Billiards |
| 2000 | Dorothy Delasin | Golf |
| 2001 | Efren "Bata" Reyes | Billiards |
| 2001 | Dorothy Delasin | Golf |
| 2002 | Manny Pacquiao | Professional Boxing |
| 2002 | Mikee Cojuangco-Jaworski | Equestrian Sports |
| 2003 | Manny Pacquiao | Professional Boxing |
| 2003 | CJ Suarez | Bowling |
| 2004 | Manny Pacquiao | Professional Boxing |
| 2004 | Jennifer Rosales | Golf |
| 2005 | Team Philippines at the 2005 Southeast Asian Games | Various Sports |
| 2006 | Manny Pacquiao | Professional Boxing |
| 2006 | Joan Tipon | Amateur Boxing |
| 2006 | Violito Payla | Amateur Boxing |
| 2006 | Ronato Alcano | Billiards |
| 2006 | Antonio Gabica | Billiards |
| 2006 | Efren "Bata" Reyes | Billiards |
| 2006 | Biboy Rivera | Bowling |
| 2006 | Rene Catalan | Wushu |
| 2007 | Nonito Donaire | Professional Boxing |
| 2007 | Miguel Molina | Swimming |
| 2008 | Manny Pacquiao | Professional Boxing |
| 2009 | Rubilen Amit | Billiards |
| 2009 | Marestella Torres | Athletics (Long Jump) |
| 2009 | Rani Ann Ortega | Taekwondo (Poomsae) |
| 2009 | Camille Alarilla | Taekwondo (Poomsae) |
| 2009 | Janice Lagman | Taekwondo (Poomsae) |
| 2009 | Jayson Castro | Basketball |
| 2010 | Francisco Bustamante | Billiards |
| 2010 | Dennis Orcollo | Billiards |
| 2010 | Biboy Rivera | Bowling |
| 2010 | Rey Saludar | Amateur Boxing |
| 2011 | Nonito Donaire | Professional Boxing |
| 2011 | Dennis Orcollo | Billiards |
| 2012 | Nonito Donaire | Boxing |
| 2012 | Manila Big League team (women's) | Softball |
| 2012 | Josie Gabuco | Boxing |
| 2012 | Ateneo Blue Eagles (men's) | Basketball |
| 2013 | Philippine national team (men's) | Basketball |
| 2014 | Daniel Caluag | BMX cycling |
| 2015 | Nonito Donaire | Boxing |
| 2015 | Donnie Nietes | Boxing |
| 2015 | Miguel Tabuena | Golf |
| 2016 | Hidilyn Diaz | Weightlifting |
| 2017 | Carlo Biado | Billiards |
| 2017 | Krizziah Lyn Tabora | Bowling |
| 2017 | Jerwin Ancajas | Boxing |
| 2018 | Hidilyn Diaz | Weightlifting |
| 2018 | Yuka Saso | Golf |
| 2018 | Bianca Pagdanganan | Golf |
| 2018 | Lois Kaye Go | Golf |
| 2018 | Margielyn Didal | Roller Sports |
| 2019 | Team Philippines at the 2019 Southeast Asian Games | Various Sports |
| 2020 | Yuka Saso | Golf |
| 2021 | Hidilyn Diaz | Weightlifting |
| 2022 | Hidilyn Diaz | Weightlifting |
| 2023 | EJ Obiena | Track and Field |
| 2024 | Carlos Yulo | Gymnastics |
| 2025 | Carlos Yulo | Gymnastics |
| 2025 | Alex Eala | Tennis |

=== Multiple-time winners ===
| Name | Total |
|---|---|
| Rafael "Paeng" Nepomuceno | 5 |
| Manny Pacquiao | 5 |
| Hidilyn Diaz | 4 |
| Nonito Donaire | 4 |
| Efren "Bata" Reyes | 3 |
| Luisito Espinosa | 3 |
| Lydia de Vega | 3 |
| Biboy Rivera | 2 |
| Bong Coo | 2 |
| Dennis Orcollo | 2 |
| Dodie Boy Peñalosa | 2 |
| Dorothy Delasin | 2 |
| Elma Muros | 2 |
| Eric Buhain | 2 |
| Frankie Miñoza | 2 |
| Team Philippines (Southeast Asian Games) | 2 |
| Yuka Saso | 2 |
| Carlos Yulo | 2 |

== Special awards ==
- Hall of Fame
  - Paeng Nepomuceno, 1997: bowling
  - Bong Coo, 2004: bowling
  - Eugene Torre, 2006: chess
  - Manny Pacquiao, 2008: professional boxing
  - Efren Reyes, 2010: billiards
  - Florencio Campomanes, 2010: chess
  - Mitsubishi Motors Philippines, 2015: tennis
  - Lydia de Vega, 2022: athletics
  - Hidilyn Diaz, 2024: weightlifting
  - Frankie Miñoza, 2025: golf
- Lifetime Achievement Award
  - Florencio Campomanes, 2006: chess
  - 1973 Philippines men's national basketball team, 2014: basketball
  - Eugene Torre, 2017: chess
  - Bong Coo, 2019: bowling
  - Paquito Rivas, 2019: cycling
  - Efren Reyes, 2019: billiards
  - Eduardo "Danding" Cojuangco, 2020: basketball
  - Joey Romasanta, 2020: volleyball
  - Sonny Barrios, 2020: basketball
  - Ramon Fernandez, 2021: basketball
  - Sonny Jaworski, 2021: basketball
  - Elma Muros, 2022: athletics
  - Allan Caidic, Samboy Lim, Joe Lipa, Dante Silverio, Turo Valenzona, 2023: basketball
  - Elorde family, 2025: boxing
  - Milagros "Mila" Emperado, 2025: chess
  - Romeo "Romy" Guevara, 2025: basketball
  - 1991 Philippines Davis Cup team, 2025: tennis
  - Monico Puentevella, 2025: weightlifting
- Athlete of the Decade
  - Manny Pacquiao, 2009: professional boxing
- Athlete of the Century 1999
  - Paeng Nepomuceno, bowling
- Athletes of the Millennium 1999
  - Lydia de Vega, athletics, track and field
  - Carlos Loyzaga, basketball
  - Paeng Nepomuceno, bowling
  - Bong Coo, bowling
  - Pancho Villa, professional boxing
  - Gabriel Elorde, professional boxing
  - Onyok Velasco, amateur boxing
  - Eugene Torre, chess
  - Teófilo Yldefonso, swimming
  - Felicisimo Ampon, tennis
- PSA's President's Award
  - NU Bulldogs, 2015: collegiate basketball
  - Gilas Pilipinas, 2016: basketball
  - Milo Rivera, 2017: motocross
  - Manny V. Pangilinan, 2018: basketball (2023 FIBA Basketball World Cup Bid Team)
  - Carlos Yulo, 2019: gymnastics
  - Abraham Tolentino, 2020: cycling/Olympics
  - Yuka Saso, 2021: golf (2021 US Women's Open Champion)
  - Carlos Yulo, 2021: gymnastics (2021 World Artistic Gymnastics Championship Gold & Silver Medalist)
  - Alex Eala, 2022: tennis (2022 US Open Girls Champion)
  - Gilas Pilipinas, 2023: basketball (2022 Asian Games gold medalist, Men's 5x5 Basketball)
  - Nesthy Petecio and Aira Villegas, 2024: boxing (2024 Summer Olympics bronze medalists)
  - Yeng Guiao, 2025: basketball (Coach, Rain or Shine Elasto Painters)
