= 2022 PSA Annual Awards =

Annual awarding ceremony

- Date: March 14, 2022
- Location: Diamond Hotel, Manila
- Country: Philippines

The 2022 San Miguel Corporation (SMC) - Philippine Sportswriters Association (PSA) Annual Awards is an annual awarding ceremony honoring the individuals (athletes and officials) and organizations that made a significant impact on Philippine sports in 2021.

The awarding ceremony is set to be held at the March 14, 2022, at the Diamond Hotel in Manila. This would be the first time that the PSA will hold its physical awards night, with a limited capacity (in accordance with the IATF and the government's health and safety protocols) during the COVID-19 pandemic, after staging the 2021 edition virtually. All guests must required to bring vaccination cards or certificates to enter the venue.

The PSA, currently headed by its president, Rey Lachica, sports editor of Tempo, is the oldest Philippine-based media group staffed by sportswriters, sports reporters, sports editors, columnists from broadsheets, tabloids, online sports websites, and radio stations.

== Honor roll ==
=== Main awards ===
The following are the list of main awards of the event.

==== Athlete of the Year ====
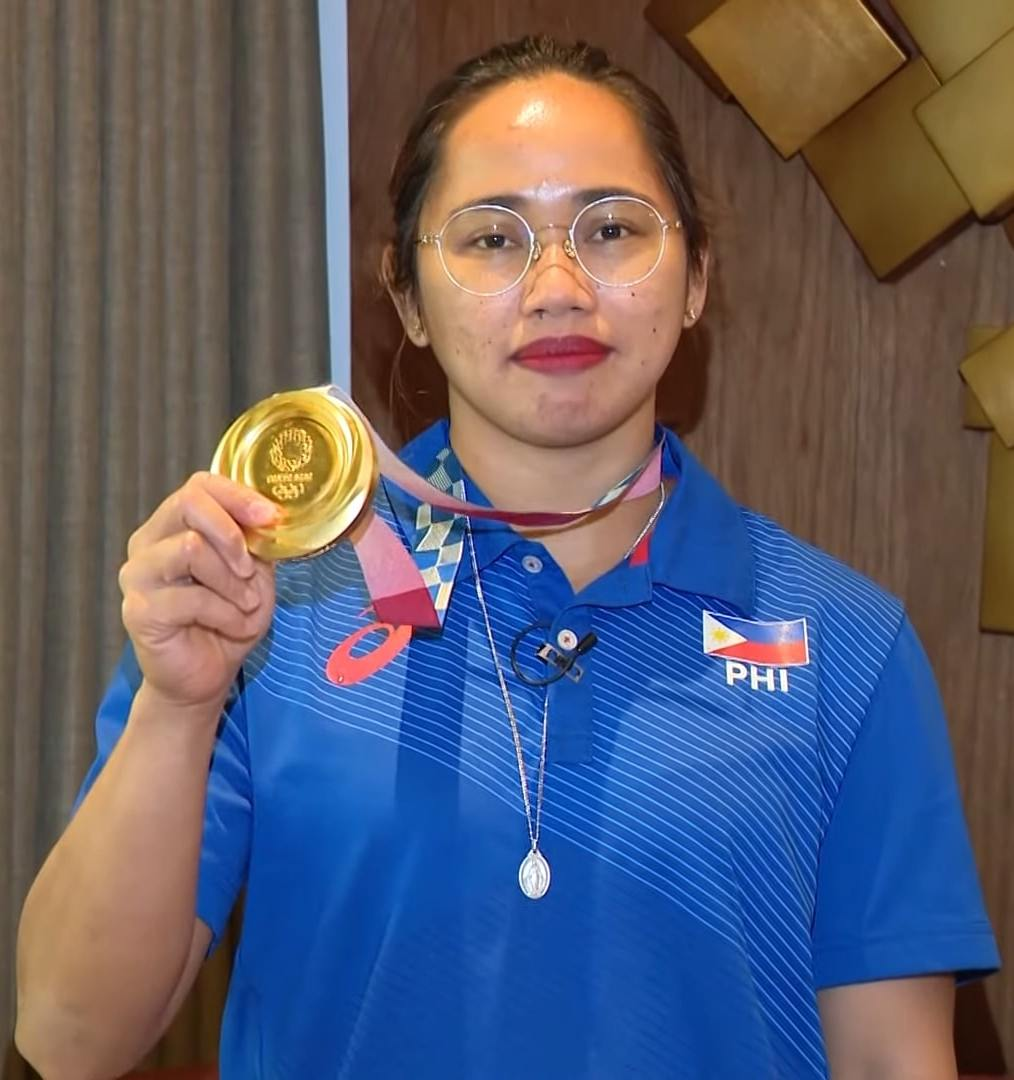
Weightlifter Hidilyn Diaz with her gold medal.

The PSA awards is set to be led by weightlifter Hidilyn Diaz who will be named as the PSA Athlete of the Year for the third time (Diaz bagged the same award in 2016 and 2018); for her feat of clinching the Philippines first ever Olympic gold medal at the 2020 Summer Olympics in Tokyo.

Award	Winner	Sport	References
Athlete of the Year	Hidilyn Diaz	Weightlifting	

==== Other major awardees ====
Here are the other major awards to be conferred in the Awards Night.

Award	Winner	Sport/Team/Recognition	References
Lifetime Achievement Award	Ramon Fernandez	Basketball (4-time Philippine Basketball Association Most Valuable Player | Commissioner, Philippine Sports Commission)	
Lifetime Achievement Award	Robert Jaworski	Basketball (4-time PBA Champion for Barangay Ginebra San Miguel | Known as "Living Legend" of Philippine basketball)	
National Sports Association of the Year	Association of Boxing Alliances in the Philippines (ABAP)	Boxing (Bagged 2 silver medals and 1 bronze medal in the 2020 Tokyo Summer Olympics boxing event)	
National Sports Association of the Year	Samahang Weightlifting ng Pilipinas (SWP)	Weightlifting (Bagged the Philippines' 1st gold medal in the Summer Olympics history for Weightlifting)	
President's Award	Yuka Saso	Golf (2020 Tokyo Olympian | 2021 U.S. Women's Open Champion)	
President's Award	Carlos Yulo	Gymnastics (2020 Tokyo Olympian | 2021 World Artistic Gymnastics Championships Champion, Men's Vault and silver medalist, Men's Parallel Bars)	
Executive of the Year	Abraham Tolentino	President, Philippine Olympic Committee	
Excellence in Leadership Award	William Ramirez	Chairman, Philippine Sports Commission	
Chooks-to-Go Fan Favorite "Manok ng Bayan" Award	Eumir Marcial	Boxing (2020 Tokyo Olympics Bronze Medalist, Men's Middleweight)	
Milo Champion of Grit and Glory Award	Hidilyn Diaz	Weightlifting (2020 Tokyo Olympics Gold Medalist, Women's 55 kg)	

=== Major awardees ===
Sorted in alphabetical order (based on their surnames).

Winner	Sport/Team/Recognition	References
Jerwin Ancajas	Professional Boxing (IBF Super Flyweight Champion)	
Carlo Biado	Billiards (2021 U.S. Open Pool Championship Champion)	
John Riel Casimero	Professional Boxing (WBO Bantamweight Champion)	
Nonito Donaire, Jr.	Professional Boxing (WBC Bantamweight Champion)	
Alex Eala	Tennis (2021 U.S. Open Junior Girls Doubles Champion)	
Eumir Marcial	Amateur Boxing (2020 Tokyo Olympics Bronze Medalist, Boxing - Men's Middleweight)	
Ernest Obiena	Athletics (2020 Tokyo Olympian and Philippine/Asian Record Holder in Men's Pole Vault)	
Carlo Paalam	Amateur Boxing (2020 Tokyo Olympics Silver Medalist, Boxing - Men's Flyweight)	
Nesthy Petecio	Amateur Boxing (2020 Tokyo Olympics Silver Medalist, Boxing - Women's Featherweight)	

=== Citations ===
Sorted in alphabetical order (based on their surnames).

Winner	Sport/Team/Recognition	References
Jeanette Aceveda	Para-Athletics (2020 Tokyo Paralympian)	
Elreen Ando	Weightlifting (2020 Tokyo Olympian)	
Kurt Barbosa	Taekwondo (2020 Tokyo Olympian)	
Gary Bejino	Para swimming (2020 Tokyo Paralympian)	
Margielyn Didal	Skateboarding (2020 Tokyo Olympian)	
Allain Ganapin	Para-Taekwondo (2020 Tokyo Paralympian)	
Ernie Gawilan	Para swimming (2020 Tokyo Paralympian)	
Luke Gebbie	Swimming (2020 Tokyo Olympian)	
Achelle Guion	Para-Powerlifting (2020 Tokyo Paralympian)	
Kristina Knott	Athletics (2020 Tokyo Olympian)	
Irish Magno	Amateur Boxing (2020 Tokyo Olympian)	
Jerrold Mangliwan	Para-Athletics (2020 Tokyo Paralympian)	
Cris Nievarez	Rowing (2020 Tokyo Olympian)	
Bianca Pagdanganan	Golf (2020 Tokyo Olympian)	
Juvic Pagunsan	Golf (2020 Tokyo Olympian)	
Remedy Rule	Swimming (2020 Tokyo Olympian)	
Vanessa Sarno	Weightlifting (2021 Asian Weightlifting Championships 2-gold and silver medalist, Women's -71 kg)	
Jayson Valdez	Shooting (2020 Tokyo Olympian)	
Kiyomi Watanabe	Judo (2020 Tokyo Olympian)	

== See also ==
- 2021 in Philippine sports
