= 2019 PSA Annual Awards =

Annual awarding ceremony

- Date: February 26, 2019
- Location: Centennial Hall, Manila Hotel, Manila
- Country: Philippines
- Hosted by: Paolo del Rosario; Rizza Diaz; Natasha Alquiros; Gerry Ramos (spin.ph); Waylon Galvez (Manila Bulletin); Abac Cordero (The Philippine Star)

Television/radio coverage
- Network: One Sports

The 2019 San Miguel Corporation – PSA Annual Awards was an annual awarding ceremony recognizing the top athletes, coaches, officials, sports personalities (both living and deceased), National Sports Associations and sports-related organizations for the year 2018, particularly those who competed in international tournaments such as the Asian Games, Asian Para Games and Summer Youth Olympics. The awards night was organized by the Philippine Sportswriters Association, the country's oldest media organization founded in 1949. PSA, which is headed by its president, Eduardo "Dodo" Catacutan, Jr. (Sports Interactive Network Philippines - Spin.ph Editor-in-Chief), is an organization of seasoned and young sports editors, columnists and writers from newspapers (broadsheets and tabloids) and online sports websites in the Philippines.

The awards night was held at the Centennial Hall of the Manila Hotel in Manila on February 26, 2019.

Leading the honor roll list of 75 awardees are Weightlifter Hidilyn Diaz, golfers Yuka Saso, Bianca Pagdanganan and Lois Kaye Go and skateboarder Margielyn Didal who received the Athlete of the Year awards. Didal and Saso were able to attend, while Diaz, Pagdanganan and Go did not, due to their current training camps in China and United States of America respectively. Top sports officials led by Philippine Sports Commission (PSC) Chairman Butch Ramirez and Philippine Olympic Committee (POC) officials attended the occasion.

1987 Southeast Asian Games bemedalled gymnast and 1992 Barcelona Olympics bronze medalist for Taekwondo (demonstration sport) Bea Lucero–Lhuillier was served as the guest speaker.

== Honor roll ==
=== Main awards ===
The following are the list of main awards of the event.

==== Athlete of the Year ====
Five of the country's female athletes from weightlifting, golf and roller sports, who have won 4 gold medals in the recently concluded 2018 Asian Games last August 18–September 2, 2018 in Jakarta and Palembang, Indonesia were honored as the Athlete of the Year awardees. This is the first time in 9 years that an all-female team will receive the highest award of the PSA Annual Awards.

In March 2010, cue artist Rubilen Amit, long jumper Marestella Torres–Sunang and taekwondo (poomsae) world champion triumvirate of Camille Alarilla, Janice Lagman–Lizardo and Rani Ann Ortega were recognized as the Athletes of the Year. Hidilyn Diaz will receive her 2nd Athlete of the Year award in three consecutive years. Diaz was once recognized by the PSA with the same award in 2017, after winning the silver medal in the 2016 Summer Olympics in Rio de Janeiro, Brazil.

Award	Winner	Sport/Team/Recognition	References
Athletes of the Year	Hidilyn Diaz	Weightlifting (2018 Asian Games Gold Medalist, Women's -53 kg Weightlifting)	
Athletes of the Year	Yuka Saso	Golf (2018 Asian Games Gold Medalist, Women's Individual Golf)	
Athletes of the Year	Bianca Pagdanganan	Golf (2018 Asian Games Gold Medalist, Women's Team Golf and Bronze Medalist, Women's Individual Golf)	
Athletes of the Year	Lois Kaye Go	Golf (2018 Asian Games Gold Medalist, Women's Team Golf)	
Athletes of the Year	Margielyn Didal	Roller sports (2018 Asian Games Gold Medalist, Women's Street Skateboarding)	

==== Other major honorees ====
Award	Winner	Sport/Team/Recognition	References
Lifetime Achievement Award	Bong Coo; Paquito Rivas	Bowling (Filipina bowling world champion / 1979 International Masters World Champion / Secretary General, Philippine Bowling Federation); Cycling (Filipino cycling legend / 1979 Marlboro Tour Champion / Race Director, Le Tour de Filipinas)	
Mighty Sports Mr. Basketball	June Mar Fajardo	Professional Basketball (Center, San Miguel Beermen (PBA), Philippines men's national basketball team (Gilas Pilipinas) / Five-time Philippine Basketball Association Most Valuable Player)	
Ms. Volleyball	Jaja Santiago	Volleyball (Middle Blocker, NU Lady Bulldogs (UAAP), Foton Tornadoes Blue Energy (PSL), Philippines women's national volleyball team (Asian Games, AVC Cup) / Import, Ageo Medics (V.League) )	
Mr. Volleyball	Marck Espejo	Volleyball (Outside Spiker, Ateneo Blue Eagles (UAAP), Cignal HD Spikers (PVL) / Import, Oita Miyoshi Weisse Adler (V.League) )	
Mr. Football	Neil Etheridge	Football (Goalkeeper, Philippines men's national football team, Cardiff City FC / First Filipino Football Player to play in Premier League)	
National Sports Association (NSA) of the Year	National Golf Association of the Philippines (NGAP)	Golf (Mother NSA of PSA Athletes of the Year & Asian Games gold medalists Y. Saso, B. Pagdanganan and L.K. Go)	
Executive of the Year	Enrique Razon	Golf (Chairman, International Container Terminal Services, Inc (ICTSI), Major Sponsor of the Philippine Golf Tour)	
President's Award & Milo NutriUp Up Your Galing Special Recognition	NU Lady Bulldogs	Collegiate Basketball (UAAP Women's Basketball 5-Peat Champions, Seasons 77, 78, 79, 80, 81)	
Chooks-to-Go Mr. Fan Favorite "Manok ng Bayan" Award	Kai Sotto	Basketball (Center, Batang Gilas, Ateneo Blue Eaglets (UAAP) / UAAP Season 81 Junior's Basketball MVP)	
Special Recognition for Sports Journalism	Lito A. Tacujan	Sportswriting (Former Sports Editor, The Philippine Star / Former President, Philippine Sportswriters Association)	
Prince of the Night	Criztian Pitt Laurente	Boxing	
Princess of the Night	Maxine Isabel Esteban	Fencing	

=== Major awardees ===
Sorted in alphabetical order (based on their surnames).

Winner	Sport/Team/Recognition	References
Jerwin Ancajas	Boxing (IBF World Super Flyweight Champion)	
Arthus Bucay	Disabled sports – Cycling (2018 Asian Para Games Gold Medalist)	
El Joshua Carino	Cycling (7-Eleven Cliqq Road Bike Philippines / 2018 Le Tour de Filipinas Champion)	
Kim Ian Chi	Disabled sports – Bowling (2018 Asian Para Games Gold Medalist)	
O'Neal P. Cortez	Horse racing (Jockey of the Year)	
Ernie Gawilan	Disabled sports – Swimming (2018 Asian Para Games Gold Medalist)	
Arnel Mandal	Wushu (2018 Wushu Sanda Cup Gold Medalist)	
Jannery Millet	Drag racing (Drag Racer of the Year)	
Donnie Nietes	Boxing (4-Division World Boxing Champion / WBO World Super Flyweight Champion)	
Margarita Ochoa	Jiu-jitsu (2018 Ju-Jitsu World Championships Gold Medalist)	
Philippines national dragon boat team (PCKDF)	Dragonboat (2018 ICF World Dragonboat Championship Overall Champion)	
Philippine Para Chess Team (Standard P1 Men) (Sander Severino, Henry Lopez, Jasper Rom)	Disabled sports – Chess (2018 Asian Para Games Gold Medalist)	
Philippine Para Chess Team (Standard B2-B3 Men) (Menandro Redor, Arman Subastre, Israel Peligro)	Disabled sports – Chess (2018 Asian Para Games Gold Medalist)	
Philippine Para Chess Team (Rapid P1 Men) (Sander Severino, Henry Lopez, Jasper Rom)	Disabled sports – Chess (2018 Asian Para Games Gold Medalist)	
Sepfourteen	Horse racing (Horse of the Year) (2018 PCSO Presidential Cup Champion)	
Thirdy Ravena	Collegiate basketball (Ateneo Blue Eagles / Gilas Pilipinas) (UAAP Season 81 Men's Basketball Finals MVP)	
Milo Rivera	Autocross (2018 National Slalom Champion)	
San Miguel Beermen	Professional basketball (2017-18 PBA Philippine Cup Champion)	
Sander Severino	Disabled sports – Chess (2018 Asian Para Games Gold Medalist)	
Tanauan Softball Team	Softball (2018 Senior League Softball World Series Champion)	
Team Manila – Softball	Softball (2018 Pony World Series 18-U Girls Championship Champion)	
Christian Tio	Kiteboarding (2018 Summer Youth Olympics Silver Medalist)	
Carlos Yulo	Gymnastics (2019 Melbourne World Cup Gold Medalist for Men's Floor Exercise)	

=== Minor citations ===
Sorted in alphabetical order (based on their surnames).

Winner	Sport/Team/Recognition	References
Salvador "Buddy" Andrada	Tennis (Former PHILTA President)	
Dottie Ardina	Golf (LPGA Tour Competitor / Ranked 291th (as of February 2019) in the Rolex Golf World Rankings)	
Kevin Belingon	Mixed Martial Arts (Team Lakay / ONE Championship Bantamweight World Champion)	
Centennial III	Sailing (Subic Bay around Verde Island Passage Race 1st Runner-Up)	
Cignal	Sports broadcasting	
Michael Dasmariñas	Boxing (IBO flyweight champion)	
Maxine Isabel Esteban	Fencing (2018 Asian U23 Fencing Championship Gold Medalist / UAAP Season 81 Fencing MVP and Rookie of the Year)	
Geje Eustaquio	Mixed Martial Arts (Team Lakay / Former ONE Championship Flyweight World Champion)	
Buboy Fernandez	Boxing (Team Pacquiao chief trainer)	
Eduard Folayang	Mixed Martial Arts (Team Lakay / ONE Championship Lightweight World Champion)	
IM Chito Garma	Chess (2018 Asian Senior Chess Championships 50-and-Over Division Championship)	
IM John Marvin Miciano	Chess (2018 Asian Youth Chess Championships Under-18 Division Champion)	
Mighty Sports Apparel and Accessories	Sports Clothing / Basketball (2019 Dubai International Basketball Challenge 1st Runner-Up / Team Sponsor, Bulacan Kuyas (MPBL))	
Ronald Oranza	Cycling (Philippine Navy – Standard Insurance / 2018 Ronda Pilipinas Champion)	
Joshua Pacio	Mixed Martial Arts (Team Lakay / Former ONE Championship Strawweight Champion )	
Bobby Ray Parks	Professional Basketball (Alab Pilipinas / Blackwater Elite / 2018 ASEAN Basketball League Local MVP)	
Philippine Junior Chess Team	Chess (ASEAN Age Group Chess Championship)	
Philippine Men's National Football Team (Azkals)	Football (2019 AFC Asian Cup Debutant)	
San Miguel Alab Pilipinas	Professional Basketball (2017–18 ASEAN Basketball League Champion)	
Janine Pontejos	Basketball (Perlas Pilipinas / 2018 FIBA 3x3 World Cup 3-Point Shootout Champion)	
Angelo Que	Golf (2018 Japan Golf Tour Top Cup Tokai Classic Champion)	
Vic Saludar	Boxing (WBO World Minimumweight Champion)	
Kenneth San Andres	Motocross (Philippine Representative at the 2018 Motocross of Nations)	
San Beda Red Lions	Collegiate Basketball (NCAA Season 94 Men's Basketball Champion)	
Smart Sports	Telecommunications / Sponsorship	
Miguel Tabuena	Golf (2018 Philippine Open & Queen's Cup Champion)	
Brandon Vera	Mixed Martial Arts (ONE Championship Heavyweight Champion)	

=== Tony Siddayao Awards for Under-17 Athletes ===
The award, which is named after Tony Siddayao (deceased), former sports editor of Manila Standard is given out to outstanding junior athletes. Sorted in alphabetical order (based on their surnames).

Winner	Sport/Team/Recognition	References
Marc Bryan Dula	Swimming (Philippine Swimming League Bemedalled Swimmer)	
Jessel Lumapas	Athletics (2018 ASEAN Schools Games Gold Medalist)	
Micaela Jasmine Mojdeh	Swimming (Philippine Swimming League Bemedalled Swimmer)	
Czerrine Ramos	Figure Skating (2018 Philippine National Figure Skating Championships Bronze Medalist)	

=== Milo Junior Athletes of the Year ===
The award, sponsored by Milo, will be given to the two young athletes who are excelled in the field of sports.

Award	Winner	Sport/Team/Recognition	References
Milo Junior Female Athlete of the Year	Alexandra Eala (Europe's Overseas Tennis Player for 2018)	Tennis	
Milo Junior Male Athlete of the Year	IM Daniel Quizon (2018 Eastern Asia Juniors Open Championships Open Division Champion)	Chess	

=== Posthumous Awards for Deceased Sports Personalities ===
This set of awards, will be bestowed upon former national & collegiate athletes, officials and sports personalities who died in 2018. They will be given a trophy and a one-minute moment of silence.

Winner	Sport/Team/Recognition	References
Rutger Acidre	Basketball (City University of Pasay Eagles)	
Leopoldo Cantancio	Boxing (Olympian Boxer / 1986 Asian Games Silver & 1990 Asian Games Bronze Medalist)	
Rastafari Darailay	Wushu (National Wushu Training Pool Member)	
Danny Florencio	Basketball (Olympian Basketball Player / Original "Skywalker" of Philippine Basketball)	
Roilo Golez	Boxing (Former ABAP President)	
Ian Lariba	Table tennis (2016 Summer Olympics Philippine Delegate and Flagbearer / Undefeated UAAP Table Tennis Champion)	
Rolly Manlapaz	Sports public announcing (Topnotch Barker for Collegiate Sports Events)	
Joey Mente	Basketball (2001 PBA All-Star Slam Dunk Champion)	
Rey Marquez	Basketball (Former PBA Commissioner)	
Maria Josefina Referente-Palad	Volleyball (Former NU Lady Bulldogs Volleyball Player)	
Barry Pascua	Sportscasting (Veteran Sportscaster & Sportswriter)	
Johnny Revilla	Basketball (Former Crispa Redmanizers Player)	
Ulysses Tanigue	Basketball (Former San Sebastian Stags Player)	
Jun Tiongco	Basketball (Centro Escolar University (CEU) Scorpions Team Manager)	

== See also ==
- 2018 in Philippine sports
- Philippines at the 2018 Asian Games
- Philippines at the 2018 Asian Para Games
- Philippines at the 2018 Summer Youth Olympics
