= PSA Annual Awards =

Awarding ceremony organized by the Philippine Sportswriters Association

- Awarded for: Contributions to Philippine sports
- Country: Philippines
- Presented by: Philippine Sportswriters Association

The PSA Annual Awards is an annual awarding ceremony, organized by the Philippine Sportswriters Association (PSA) to honor individual Filipinos or teams for their contribution in sports in the year prior save for certain awards. The PSA is the oldest extant media organization in the Philippines, having been established in 1949. Its membership consists of sportswriters and editors from various tabloids, newspapers, and sports websites in the Philippines.

Several awards are given to Filipino athletes annually, with the most prestigious recognition being the "Athlete of the Year" award.

== Awards given ==
=== Athlete of the Year ===
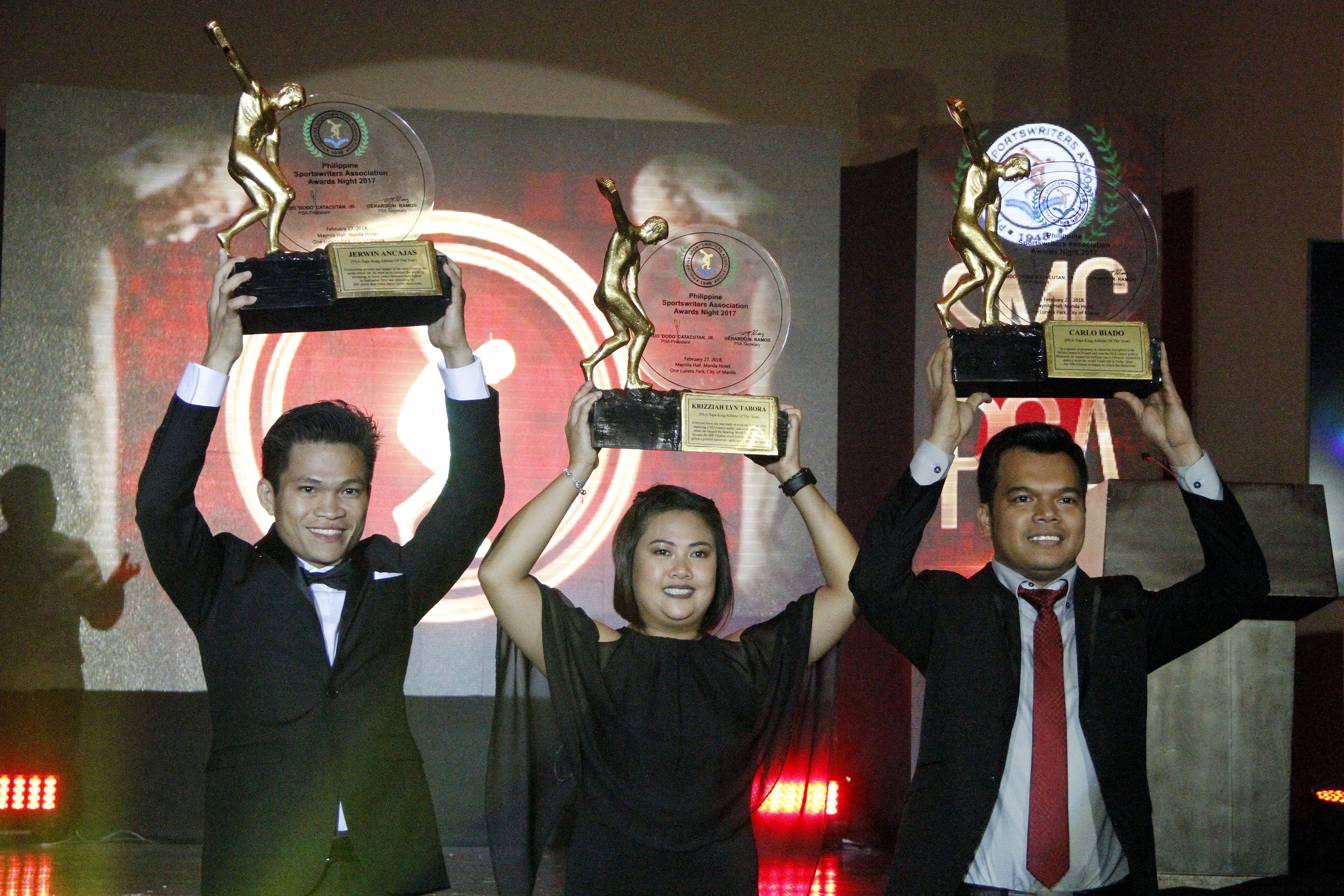
2017 PSA Athletes of the Year, Jerwin Ancajas, Krizziah Tabora; and Carlo Biado.

=== Other major awards ===
The sports media body also gives other major awards reserved for sports executives, coaches, and athletes of specific sports.

- Hall of Fame Award
- Lifetime Achievement Award
- President's Award
- Executive of the Year
- National Sports Association of the Year
- Mr. Basketball
- Ms. Basketball
- Coach of the Year
- Ms. Volleyball
- Mr. Volleyball
- Mr. Football
- Ms. Football
- Ms. Golf
- Lifetime/Special Award for Sports Journalism
- Major Awards
- Special Awards
- Citations
- Tony Siddayao Awards for Junior Athletes
- Milo Junior Athletes of the Year
- Posthumous Honors

== Editions ==
Edition	Awarding ceremony date	Venue	Location
2015	February 16, 2015	One Esplanade	Pasay
2016	February 13, 2016	One Esplanade	Pasay
2017	February 13, 2017	Le Pavilion	Pasay
2018	February 27, 2018	Manila Hotel	Manila
2019	February 26, 2019	Manila Hotel	Manila
2020	March 6, 2020	Manila Hotel	Manila
2021	March 27, 2021	TV5 Media Center (Virtual)	Mandaluyong
2022	March 14, 2022	Diamond Hotel	Manila
2023	March 6, 2023	Diamond Hotel	Manila
2024	January 29, 2024	Diamond Hotel	Manila
2025	January 27, 2025	Manila Hotel	Manila
2026	February 16, 2026	Diamond Hotel	Manila
