= 2016 PSA Annual Awards =

Award ceremony

- Date: February 13, 2016
- Location: One Esplanade, Pasay
- Country: Philippines
- Hosted by: Patricia Bermudez Hizon; Quinito Henson

Television/radio coverage
- Network: Sports Radio 918
- Runtime: 2 hours

The 2016 PSA Annual Awards was organized by the Philippine Sportswriters Association, the oldest media organization based in the Philippines formed by sportswriters from newspapers (broadsheets and tabloids) and sports news websites. PSA is currently helmed by Riera U. Mallari of the Manila Standard. The awards night was co-presented by MVP Sports Foundation, Milo, Philippine Racing Commission, San Miguel Corporation, the Philippine Sports Commission (PSC), the Philippine Olympic Committee (POC), the Philippine Charity Sweepstakes Office, Philippine Basketball Association (PBA), Accel, GlobalPort, Rain or Shine, Maynilad, Smart Communications, ICTSI, the Philippine Amusement and Gaming Corporation, SM Prime Holdings, One Esplanade, National University and Senator Francis Escudero. The awards were given to the Philippine athletes and organizations in recognition of their achievements and victories in 2015, particularly the Filipino gold medalists in the 2015 Southeast Asian Games.

Ceremonies were held at One Esplanade, Pasay on 13 February 2016 at 8 pm and hosted by veteran sportscaster Quinito Henson and Sports5 head Patricia Bermudez-Hizon. Wilfred Steven Uytengsu, who will receive the award as Executive of the Year, was invited to be the event's guest speaker.

Filipino boxing champions Nonito Donaire and Donnie Nietes and Asian Open golf standout Miguel Tabuena will share the trophy as the Athlete of the Year. It is the first time in 3 years that the PSA Athlete of the Year award will give out to multiple athletes.

PSC Chairman Richie Garcia and its commissioners Jolly Gomez, Buddy Andrada, Akiko Thomson-Guevara, and Iggy Clavecilla, POC Executive Director Guillermo Iroy, Jr., POC President Peping Cojuangco, International Olympic Committee representative to the Philippines Mikee Cojuangco-Jaworski, POC 1st Vice President Joey Romasanta and POC Chairman Tom Carrasco are also invited in the ceremonies.

== Honor Roll list ==
=== Special awards ===
The following list is the special awards given in the 2016 PSA Annual Awards.

Award	Winner	Sport/Team	References
Athlete of the Year	Nonito Donaire	Boxing	
Athlete of the Year	Donnie Nietes	Boxing	
Athlete of the Year	Miguel Tabuena	Golf	
President's Award	Gilas Pilipinas (Philippines men's national basketball team)	Basketball	
Mr. Basketball	Calvin Abueva	Basketball (Alaska Aces/Gilas Pilipinas)	
Mr. Basketball	Terrence Romeo	Basketball (GlobalPort Batang Pier/Gilas Pilipinas)	
Ms. Volleyball	Alyssa Valdez	Volleyball (Ateneo Lady Eagles/PLDT Home Ultera Ultra Fast Hitters/Philippines women's national volleyball team)	
NSA of the Year	Wushu Federation of the Philippines	Wushu	
Lifetime Achievement Award	Filomeno Codiñera	Baseball/Softball	
Executive of the Year	Wilfred Steven Uytengsu	Basketball (Alaska Aces governor)	
Milo Junior Athletes of the Year	Kyle Soguilon; Justine Kobe Macario	Swimming; Poomsae	
POC Olympism Award	Carlos Loyzaga	Basketball	

=== Major citations ===
The following list is the major citations given to some notable personalities in Philippine sports in 2016.

Winner	Sport/Team/Recognition	References
June Mar Fajardo	Basketball (San Miguel Beermen)	
Mac Belo	Basketball (FEU Tamaraws)	
Mark Cruz	Basketball (Letran Knights)	
Eric Cray	Athletics (Southeast Asian Games (SEA) Games gold medalist)	
Cheska Centeño	Billiards (SEA Games gold medalist)	
Santy Barnachea	Cycling (2015 Ronda Pilipinas champion)	
Cyna Rodriguez	Golf (LPGA tour golfer)	
Princess Superal	Golf (2015 Philippines Ladies Open champion)	
Raniel Resuello	Biking (Philippine SuperBike champion)	
Divine Wally	Wushu (Wushu World Championship gold medalist)	
Arnel Mandal	Wushu (Wushu World Championship gold medalist)	
Jonathan B. Hernandez	Horse racing (Champion jockey)	
Katharina Lehnert	Tennis (SEA Games standout)	
AJ Lim	Tennis (SEA Games standout)	

=== Minor citations ===
Winner	Sport/Team/Recognition	References
Philippine team gold medalists (incl. Eric Cray and the Gilas Cadets)	2015 Southeast Asian Games	
Philippine team gold medalists (incl. Ernie Gawilan and Adeline Dumapong-Ancheta)	2015 ASEAN Para Games	
Michael Christian Martinez	Ice skating	
Amaya Paz-Cojuangco	Archery	
Jennifer Chan	Archery	
Mary Joy Tabal	Track and field	
Kobe Paras	Basketball	
Philippines men's national under-17 basketball team	Basketball	
Sinag-Perlas Dragon Boat National Team	Dragon boat	
Khristina Charisse Santiago	Karate	
Kenneth San Andres	Motocross	
Milo Rivera	Slalom racer	
Ernesto Echauz	Sailing (President of Philippine Sailing Association)	
Hagen Alexander Topacio	Shooting	
Petron Blaze Spikers	Volleyball	
Hidilyn Diaz	Weightlifting	
Nestor Colonia	Weightlifting	
ALA Boxing Promotions (Pinoy Pride producers)	Boxing	
International Premier Tennis League	Tennis	
Manila North team (Calvin Abueva, Vic Manuel, Karl Dehesa, Troy Rosario)	3x3 basketball	
MVP Sports Foundation	Sports development and advocacy	
NU Pep Squad	Cheerleading	
Philippines national baseball team	Baseball	
Philippine National Powerlifting team	Powerlifting	
Philippine Super Liga	Volleyball	
SM Lifestyle Entertainment, Inc.	Sports development and advocacy	
John Henri Lhuillier, Oscar Hilado, Rommie Chan, and Hanky Lee	Tennis patrons	
Samahang Basketbol ng Pilipinas team in the bids for the 2019 FIBA World Basketball Cup	Basketball	

=== Tony Siddayao Awards for Under 17 athletes ===
The award was given to young and exceptional athletes who are under the age of 17 years old. It was named after Tony Siddayao, the former sports editor of Manila Standard.

Winner	Sport/Team/Recognition	References
Maurice Sacho Illustre	Swimming (2015 Palarong Pambansa gold medalist)	
Nicole Pamintuan	Swimming (2015 Palarong Pambansa gold medalist)	
Miguel Barretto	Swimming	
Micaela Jasmine Moldeh	Swimming	
Sean Terrace Zamora	Swimming	
Abby Arevalo	Golf	
Pauline del Rosario	Golf	
Jacob Ang	Karting	
Nicole Eijansantos	Triathlon	

=== Posthumous awards ===
The posthumous awards were given to the Philippines sports personalities who died in 2015. They were given a trophy and a one-minute silence for the honorees.

- Ramil Cruz (PBA technical director and assistant coach of UP Fighting Maroons)
- Servillano Padiz, Jr. (father of Philippine sepak takraw)
- Irineo Federigan (former softball national player)
- Henry Cojuangco (former San Miguel Corporation executive)
- Jun Castro, Jr. (former PSC commissioner and running enthusiast)
- Lim Eng Beng (former PBA and De La Salle Green Archers player)
- Arturo Macapagal (played at the 1972 Summer Olympics in Munich)
- Ron Jacobs (former Philippines men's national basketball team coach)

== See also ==
- 2015 in Philippine sports
