= Salvador Andrada =

Filipino sports executive

- Born: December 23, 1936
- Died: April 8, 2020 (aged 83); Philippines
- Known for: President of the Philippine Tennis Association (1986–2007; disputed: 2016–2017)

Salvador "Buddy" H. Andrada (December 23, 1936 – April 8, 2020) was a Filipino sports executive who was a long-time president of the Philippine Tennis Association.

== Early life ==
Salvador Andrada was born on December 23, 1936. He was also an Armed Forces of the Philippines personnel who held the rank of colonel. He was a doubles tennis player himself and partnered with Manny Misa.

== Sports administration ==
Salvador Andrada became president of the Philippine Tennis Association (Philta) succeeding Pablo Olivarez in 1986. Andrada started organizing the Andrada Cup, a youth tennis tournament which lasted in 1989.

Under Andrada's presidency the Philippines upset Japan 3–2, in the 1988 Davis Cup Asia/Oceania Zone. The Philippines also reached the qualifying round of the 1991 Davis Cup World Group played against Sweden.

He also brought in players John McEnroe and Björn Borg for the 1989 Fire and Ice series at the Ninoy Aquino Stadium in Manila.

From 2000 to 2002, Andrara was president of the Asian Tennis Federation He quit due to health reasons. He remained Philta president until 2007.

Andrada was appointed by Philippine president Benigno Aquino III as a commissioner for the Philippine Sports Commission from 2010 to 2016.

Andradra was elected again as Philta president on July 29, 2016, replacing Edwin Olivarez who resigned. This was disputed by a faction including vice president Randy Villanueva. The International Tennis Federation recognized Villanueva as acting president.

Andrada stated he "might" resign in December 2016 but later committed to finishing Olivarez's unexpired term until 2019. A walkout was initiated by Randy Villanueva, Jean Henri Lhuillier, Julito Villanueva, and Gerard Maronillain during the elections held in February 2017.

Sponsors also withdrew support from Philta, including Cebuana Lhuillier of Lhuillier and Palawan Pawnshop CEO Bobby Castro. Andrara resigned on February 27, 2017.

The Andrada Cup held its last edition in 2019, which coincides with the end of Andrada's involvement in tennis.

== Death ==
Andrada died on April 8, 2020, in the Philippines due to cardiac arrest.
