= Golf at the 2018 Asian Games – Women's team =

Women's team at the 2018 Asian Games
- Venue: Pondok Indah Golf & Country Club
- Date: 23 August 2018 – 26 August 2018
- Competitors: 41 from 15 nations

Medalists
gold medal	Philippines (PHI)
silver medal	South Korea (KOR)
bronze medal	China (CHN)

The women's team competition at the 2018 Asian Games in Jakarta, Indonesia was held from 23 August to 26 August at the Pondok Indah Golf & Country Club.

== Schedule ==
All times are Western Indonesia Time (UTC+07:00)

Date	Time	Event
Thursday, 23 August 2018	06:00	Round 1
Friday, 24 August 2018	06:00	Round 2
Saturday, 25 August 2018	06:00	Round 3
Sunday, 26 August 2018	06:00	Round 4

== Results ==
Rank	Team	Round				Total	To par
Rank	Team	1	2	3	4	Total	To par
1st place, gold medalist(s)	Philippines (PHI)	143	139	140	132	554	−22
	Yuka Saso	71	69	69	66	275	−13
	Bianca Pagdanganan	~~72~~	70	71	66	279	−9
	Lois Kaye Go	72	~~72~~	~~75~~	~~73~~	292	+4
2nd place, silver medalist(s)	South Korea (KOR)	142	140	138	137	557	−19
	Ryu Hae-ran	71	72	~~71~~	66	280	−8
	Lim Hee-jeong	71	68	71	71	281	−7
	Jeong Yun-ji	~~74~~	~~74~~	67	~~74~~	289	+1
3rd place, bronze medalist(s)	China (CHN)	138	135	140	145	558	−18
	Liu Wenbo	69	69	67	73	278	−10
	Du Mohan	69	66	73	~~74~~	282	−6
	Yin Ruoning	~~76~~	~~73~~	~~75~~	72	296	+8
4	Thailand (THA)	143	142	141	139	565	−11
	Kan Bunnabodee	~~76~~	~~72~~	~~74~~	~~73~~	295	+7
	Kultida Pramphun	73	72	72	68	285	−3
	Atthaya Thitikul	70	70	69	71	280	−8
5	Japan (JPN)	136	142	147	144	569	−7
	Sae Ogura	~~69~~	~~72~~	~~77~~	76	294	+6
	Riri Sadoyama	69	72	73	~~78~~	292	+4
	Ayaka Furue	67	70	74	68	279	−9
6	Indonesia (INA)	143	139	145	143	570	−6
	Rivani Adelia Sihotang	~~77~~	~~77~~	~~79~~	~~75~~	308	+20
	Ribka Vania	71	69	75	70	285	−3
	Melati Putri Ida Ayu Indira	72	70	70	73	285	−3
7	Chinese Taipei (TPE)	145	144	141	146	576	E
	Hou Yu-sang	~~73~~	~~74~~	~~75~~	75	297	+9
	An Ho-yu	73	72	70	~~79~~	294	+6
	Hou Yu-chiang	72	72	71	71	286	−2
8	India (IND)	146	144	146	143	579	+3
	Sifat Sagoo	75	72	~~75~~	~~73~~	295	+7
	Ridhima Dilawari	~~77~~	72	72	71	292	+4
	Diksha Dagar	71	~~78~~	74	72	295	+7
9	Malaysia (MAS)	144	145	145	148	582	+6
	Ashley Lau Jen Wen	72	71	70	74	287	−1
	Natasha Andrea Oon	72	~~74~~	~~75~~	74	295	+7
	Ng Yu Xuan	~~79~~	74	75	~~79~~	307	+19
10	Hong Kong (HKG)	152	146	146	139	583	+7
	Mimi Ho Miu Yee	78	71	~~77~~	~~76~~	302	+14
	Michelle Cheung	~~79~~	75	75	72	301	+13
	Isabella Leung	74	~~76~~	71	67	288	E
11	Macau (MAC)	161	165	157	153	636	+60
	Hun Teng Teng	88	92	85	80	345	+57
	Kuan Ieong Sin	73	73	72	73	291	+3
12	Kazakhstan (KAZ)	164	165	159	157	645	+69
	Albina Agayeva	83	89	88	84	344	+56
	Rivekka Jumagulova	81	76	71	73	301	+13
13	Bangladesh (BAN)	169	165	159	158	651	+75
	Sonya Akther	82	79	79	80	320	+32
	Liza Akter	87	86	80	78	331	+43
14	Vietnam (VIE)	176	165	166	170	677	+101
	Doan Xuan Khue Minh	86	79	83	83	331	+43
	Tran Chieu Duong	90	86	83	87	346	+58
15	Mongolia (MGL)	186	185	178	177	726	+150
	Byambajav Batnaran	~~95~~	~~95~~	~~94~~	~~92~~	376	+88
	Nadmid Namuunaa	91	91	90	87	359	+71
	Altansukh Enerel	95	94	88	90	367	+79
