= 2020 in Philippine sports =

The following is a list of notable events and developments that are related to Philippine sports in 2020.

== Events ==
=== Athletics ===
- August 17 – Filipino pole vaulter EJ Obiena bagged a silver in his first online tournament, fresh from his historic bronze-medal finish in the 2020 Monaco Diamond League.
- August 30 – Kristina Knott, the 2019 Southeast Asian Games champion for 200m, wins the silver medal and broke the longstanding record which was previously held by athletics legend Lydia de Vega, who registered 11.28 seconds during the 1987 SEA Games in Jakarta in historic fashion in the Drake Blue Oval Showcase in Iowa, USA.
- September 9 – EJ Obiena has recorded a season-high 5.74 meters to win the 59th Ostrava Golden Spike competition in Czech Republic.

=== Basketball ===
==== Amateur ====
- March 9 – The DENR Warriors claimed the first championship title of the UNTV Cup Season 8 after they won against the AFP Cavaliers in the Game 2 of the Finals series at Smart Araneta Coliseum, Quezon City. ₱4 million cash prize for their chosen beneficiary.
- June 1 – The Maharlika Pilipinas Basketball League (MPBL) has officially canceled its 2019–2020 season, citing the restrictions caused by the COVID-19 crisis as well as the uncertainty surrounding the franchise renewal of ABS-CBN.

==== Professional ====
- January 17 – The Barangay Ginebra San Miguel were crowned as the 2019 PBA Governors' Cup champions after clinching a 105–93 against the Meralco Bolts in a Game 5 for the 12th straight title at the Mall of Asia Arena.
- March 8 – The opening of the 45th season of PBA was held at the Smart Araneta Coliseum.
- June 3 – The PBA Board of Governors approved the transfer of the ownership of the Columbian Dyip franchise from Columbian Autocar Corporation to its sister company Terrafirma Realty Development Corporation.
- December 9 – The Barangay Ginebra San Miguel were crowned as the 2020 PBA Philippine Cup champions after beating TNT Tropang Giga 4–1 in the finals bubble series, winning 13th straight title at the AUF Sports Arena, and ending their 13-year All-Filipino drought since the last time they won in the year 2007.

==== Collegiate ====
- September 9 – University of Santo Tomas (UST) head coach Aldin Ayo has been banned indefinitely from the UAAP for his role in the controversial "Sorsogon bubble," where the UST men's basketball team conducted a training camp in his hometown, in a potential violation of quarantine protocols.

=== Boxing ===
- September 26 – John Riel Casimero of the Philippines has made a successful first defense of his WBO bantamweight crown by knocking out Ghana's Duke Micah in the third round of their title fight in Connecticut.
- December 20 – Reymart Gaballo defeats Puerto Rican Emmanuel Rodríguez by split decision to claim the WBC interim bantamweight title.

=== Collegiate sports ===
- July 25 – University of Santo Tomas (UST) was emerged as the overall champion of the 82nd season of the UAAP, leading the way in both the collegiate and high school divisions.
- December 11 – The University Athletic Association of the Philippines announced the cancellation of its 83rd season due to COVID-19 pandemic in the Philippines.

=== Football ===
- July 23 – Ceres Negros renamed the club to become United City F.C. after Ceres chief Leo Ray Yanson decided to sell the club to MMC Sportz Asia due to the COVID-19 pandemic.
- November 6 – United City F.C. clinches a historic 2020 Philippines Football League title under a new name and in the first bubble set-up.

=== Mixed martial arts ===
- January 31 – Joshua Pacio of Team Lakay successfully defended his Strawweight World title against former champion Alex Silva via split decision at ONE Championship 107: Fire & Fury in Pasay City, Philippines

=== Volleyball ===
- February 29 – The opening of the 8th season of PSL was held at the Filoil Flying V Centre.

=== Weightlifting ===
- January 28 – Hidilyn Diaz wins 3 gold medals in the 2020 Weightlifting World Cup in Rome, Italy.

=== Other events ===
- March 6 – 2020 PSA Annual Awards
- March 8 – After one year of broadcasts, 5 Plus rebrands as One Sports. In addition of transferring the name from cable to free-to-air, its cable and satellite counterpart has been also rebranded to One Sports+.
- March 12
  - The major sports leagues across the country announce a temporary suspension of play in an attempt to slow the spread of the coronavirus. the Philippine Basketball Association, the PBA Developmental League, and the Philippine Super Liga announces an indefinite suspension of league activity, while the Maharlika Pilipinas Basketball League and the National Basketball League announced that will suspend the remainder of the playoffs. In addition, the National Collegiate Athletic Association and the University Athletic Association of the Philippines games are canceled. The suspension of the four leagues adds a large schedule void for 5, One Sports, One Sports+, PBA Rush, S+A, Liga and Solar Sports.
  - The major sports leagues across the country announce a temporary suspension or termination of play in an attempt to slow the spread of the coronavirus.
- March 30 — One Sports temporary suspends broadcast due to limitations brought about by the Enhanced Community Quarantine in Luzon, with 5 taking over some of its archived programming.

=== Other sports ===
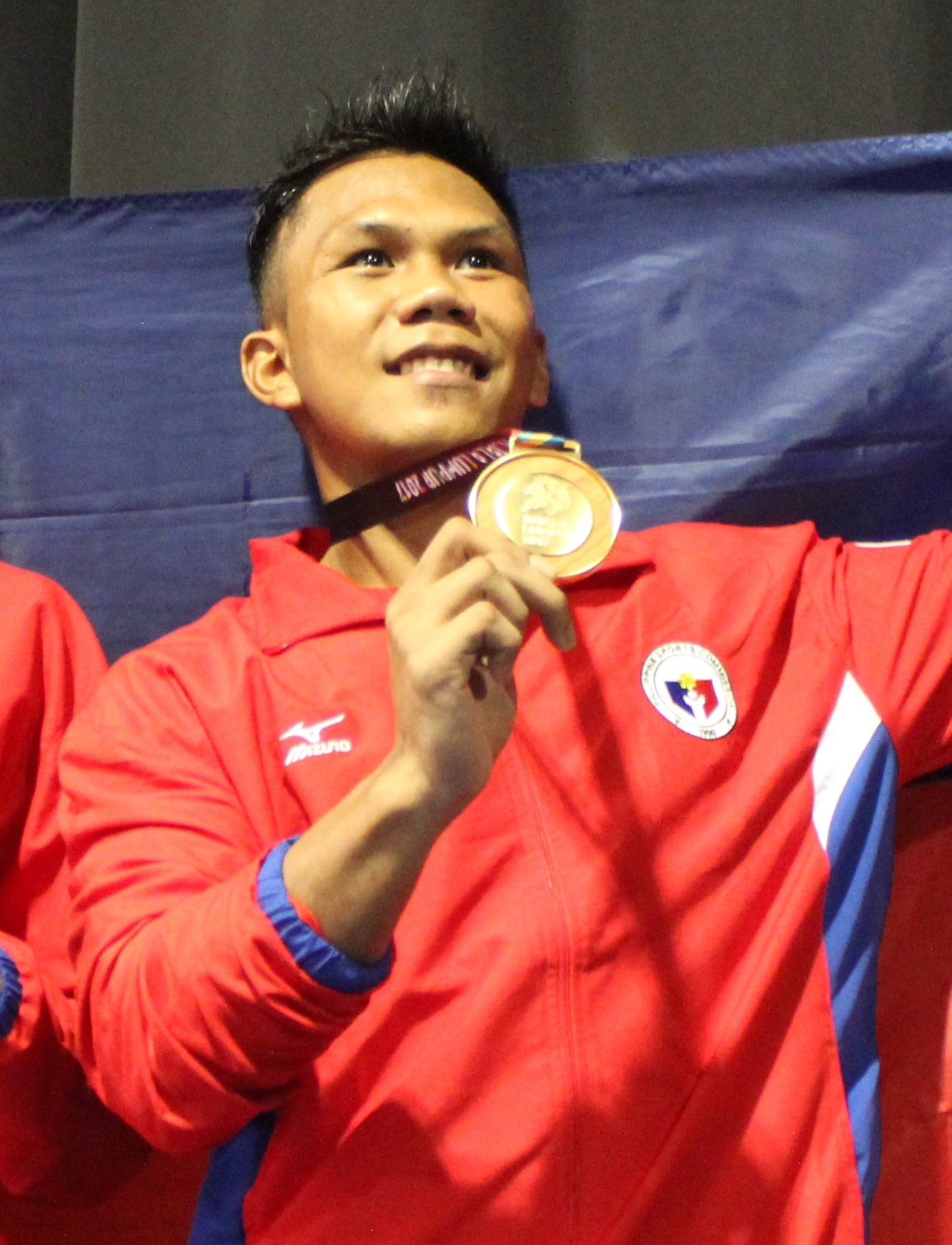
Eumir Marcial

- January 28, Weightlifting – Hidilyn Diaz wins 3 gold medals in the 2020 Weightlifting World Cup in Rome, Italy.
- January 31, Tennis – Alexandra Eala clinched her maiden juniors Grand Slam title with Indonesian partner Priska Nugroho in the 2020 Australian Open juniors doubles tournament in Melbourne Park.
- February 11–16 – Badminton: The Philippines to Host the 2020 Badminton Asia Team Championships at the Rizal Memorial Coliseum in Manila
- May 10, Taekwondo – Three-time UAAP poomsae champion Jocel Ninobla of University of Santo Tomas wins a gold medal in the Under-30 Female Division of the first Online Daedo Open European Poomsae Championships.
- May 22, Chess – Sander Severino, a Filipino chess master wins second place in the first ever First FIDE Online Cup for People with Disabilities.
- June 17, Chess – Sander Severino won first place in the first ever International Physically Disabled Chess Association (IPCA) Online World Championship.
- June 19, Skateboard – Cebuanos Margielyn Didal and Motic Panugalinog were declared winner in the men's and women's divisions of the 2020 Asian Skateboarding Championship Lockdown 5 online competition.
- July 17 – Mikee Cojuangco-Jaworski of the Philippines, was elected to the International Olympic Committee (IOC) Executive Board, the highest body in the international sports governing organization.
- July 30, Weightlifting – Rio 2016 Olympics silver medalist and 2019 Southeast Asian Games gold medalist Hidilyn Diaz won the 59 kg category of the 2020 Oceania Weightlifting Federation (OWF) Eleiko Email International Lifters Tournament.
- August 11, Karate – James delos Santos has beaten the world no. 1 in the virtual kata rankings to win the gold medal at the Athlete's E-Tournament Series 1.
- August 16, Golf – Asian Games gold medalist Yuka Saso has finally won in the Japan LPGA Tour as she fired a 9-under par 63 to rule the NEC Karuizawa Tournament in Kitasaku-gun, Nagano Prefecture.

== Awards ==
- March 6 – 2020 PSA Annual Awards

== Deaths ==
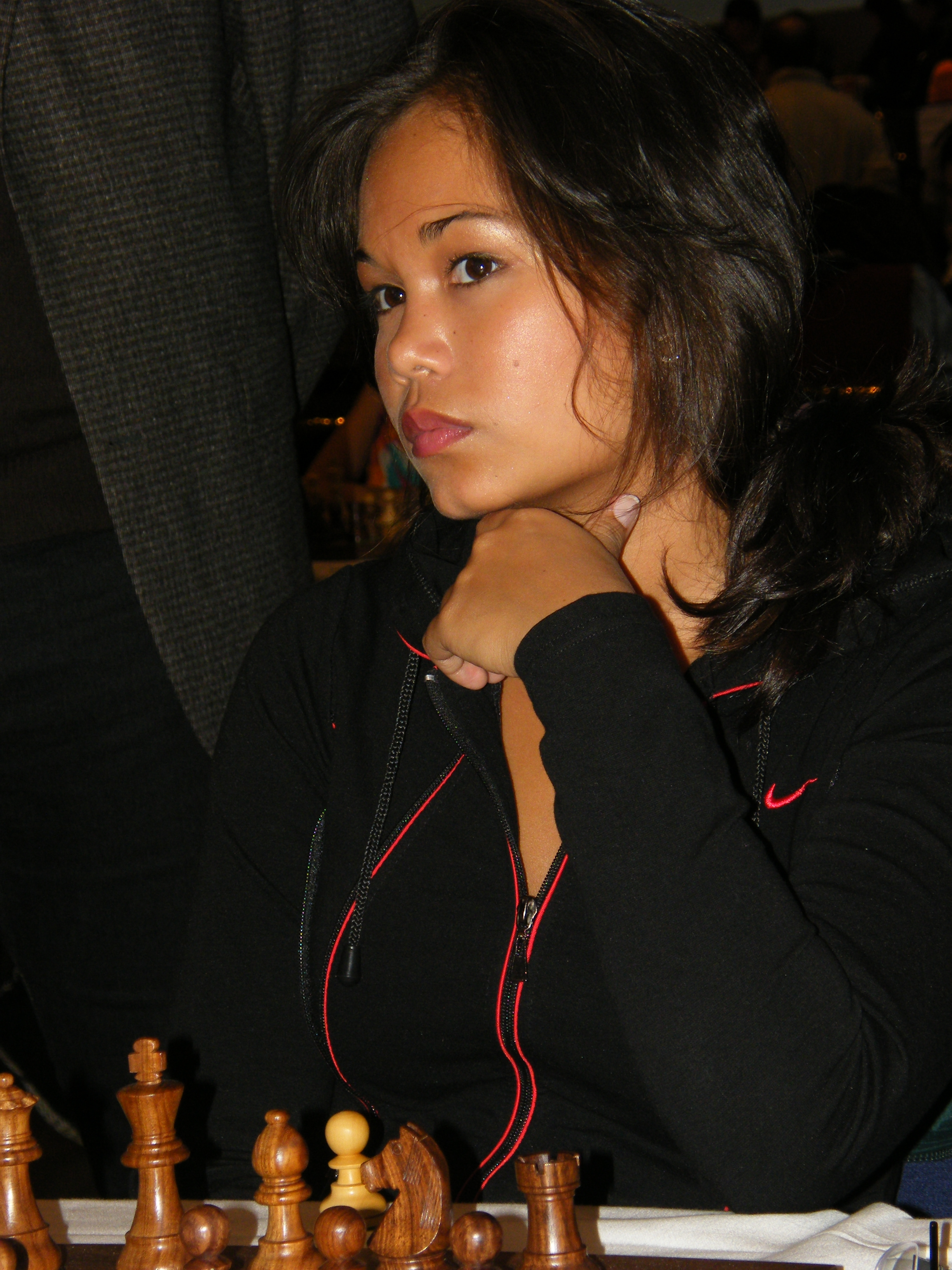
Arianne Caoili

=== January ===
- January 9 — Iñaki Vicente (b. 1955), football player.

=== March ===
- Aric Del Rosario
- March 30 – Arianne Caoili (b. 1986), Filipina chess player

== See also ==
- 2020 in the Philippines
- 2020 in sports
