= Golf at the 2018 Asian Games – Women's individual =

Sporting Event

Women's individual at the 2018 Asian Games
- Venue: Pondok Indah Golf & Country Club
- Date: 23 August 2018 – 26 August 2018
- Competitors: 42 from 16 nations

Medalists
gold medal	Yuka Saso	Philippines
silver medal	Liu Wenbo	China
bronze medal	Bianca Pagdanganan	Philippines

The women's individual competition at the 2018 Asian Games in Jakarta, Indonesia was held from 23 August to 26 August at the Pondok Indah Golf & Country Club.

== Schedule ==
All times are Western Indonesia Time (UTC+07:00)

Date	Time	Event
Thursday, 23 August 2018	06:00	Round 1
Friday, 24 August 2018	06:00	Round 2
Saturday, 25 August 2018	06:00	Round 3
Sunday, 26 August 2018	06:00	Round 4

== Results ==
Rank	Athlete	Round				Total	To par
Rank	Athlete	1	2	3	4	Total	To par
1st place, gold medalist(s)	Yuka Saso (PHI)	71	69	69	66	275	−13
2nd place, silver medalist(s)	Liu Wenbo (CHN)	69	69	67	73	278	−10
3rd place, bronze medalist(s)	Bianca Pagdanganan (PHI)	72	70	71	66	279	−9
4	Ayaka Furue (JPN)	67	70	74	68	279	−9
5	Atthaya Thitikul (THA)	70	70	69	71	280	−8
5	Ryu Hae-ran (KOR)	71	72	71	66	280	−8
7	Lim Hee-jeong (KOR)	71	68	71	71	281	−7
8	Du Mohan (CHN)	69	66	73	74	282	−6
9	Ribka Vania (INA)	71	69	75	70	285	−3
9	Kultida Pramphun (THA)	73	72	72	68	285	−3
9	Melati Putri Ida Ayu Indira (INA)	72	70	70	73	285	−3
12	Hou Yu-chiang (TPE)	72	72	71	71	286	−2
13	Ashley Lau Jen Wen (MAS)	72	71	70	74	287	−1
14	Isabella Leung (HKG)	74	76	71	67	288	E
15	Jeong Yun-ji (KOR)	74	74	67	74	289	+1
16	Kuan Ieong Sin (MAC)	73	73	72	73	291	+3
17	Ridhima Dilawari (IND)	77	72	72	71	292	+4
17	Riri Sadoyama (JPN)	69	72	73	78	292	+4
17	Lois Kaye Go (PHI)	72	72	75	73	292	+4
20	Sae Ogura (JPN)	69	72	77	76	294	+6
20	An Ho-yu (TPE)	73	72	70	79	294	+6
22	Kan Bunnabodee (THA)	76	72	74	73	295	+7
22	Natasha Andrea Oon (MAS)	72	74	75	74	295	+7
22	Sifat Sagoo (IND)	75	72	75	73	295	+7
22	Diksha Dagar (IND)	71	78	74	72	295	+7
26	Yin Ruoning (CHN)	76	73	75	72	296	+8
27	Hou Yu-sang (TPE)	73	74	75	75	297	+9
28	Michelle Cheung (HKG)	79	75	75	72	301	+13
28	Rivekka Jumagulova (KAZ)	81	76	71	73	301	+13
30	Mimi Ho Miu Yee (HKG)	78	71	77	76	302	+14
31	Ng Yu Xuan (MAS)	79	74	75	79	307	+19
32	Rivani Adelia Sihotang (INA)	77	77	79	75	308	+20
33	Sonya Akther (BAN)	82	79	79	80	320	+32
34	Doan Xuan Khue Minh (VIE)	86	79	83	83	331	+43
34	Liza Akter (BAN)	87	86	80	78	331	+43
36	Albina Agayeva (KAZ)	83	89	88	84	344	+56
37	Hun Teng Teng (MAC)	88	92	85	80	345	+57
38	Tran Chieu Duong (VIE)	90	86	83	87	346	+58
39	Reema Al-Heloo (UAE)	91	89	85	92	357	+69
40	Nadmid Namuunaa (MGL)	91	91	90	87	359	+71
41	Altansukh Enerel (MGL)	95	94	88	90	367	+79
42	Byambajav Batnaran (MGL)	95	95	94	92	376	+88

Bianca Pagdanganan beat Ayaka Furue at the first hole of a sudden-death playoff.
