= Wilfred Steven Uytengsu =

Filipino sports and business executive

Personal information
- National team: Philippines
- Born: Wilfred Steven B. Uytengsu Jr. November 21, 1961 (age 64) Cebu City, Philippines
- Education: International School Manila, University of Southern California
- Occupation: Businessman

Sport
- Country: Philippines
- Sport: Swimming, Triathlon
- Rank: Unranked (triathlon)
- University team: USC swimming team
- Coached by: Peter Daland (swimming, c.1979-1983)
- Updated on February 18, 2016

Wilfred Steven "Fred" B. Uytengsu Jr. is a Filipino businessman. As of August 2017, Forbes lists him as the 35th richest in the Philippines with a net worth of $240 million.

== Personal life ==
Uytengsu was born in November 11, 1961 in Cebu City to Wilfred T. Uytengsu, Sr. and Bonnie Brooks. His paternal grandparents were Chinese Filipino. He obtained a bachelor's degree in Business Administration from the University of Southern California in 1983. After completing his studies in the United States, he returned to the Philippines and joined the family owned Alaska Milk Corporation (AMC). He became president of AMC in 1998 and its CEO in 2007. He stepped down as CEO and President by the end of 2018 and remains as Chairman of the company.

Uytengsu is married to Kerri Elaine Dunn with whom he has three children.

== Athletic career ==
Uytengsu joined the swimming team of the University of Southern California (USC) on his first year at the institution. He was coming from an injury on his right leg which he sustained in a car accident during his last school year as a high school student. In 1982, at the end of his third year in the university, he was voted to be the captain of the team in the next school year in 1983. He was coached by Peter Daland during his stay with the USC team. He also represented the Philippines in international competitions as part of the national swimming team, including the team that competed at the 1981 Southeast Asian Games.

Uytengsu also became involved in triathlon, doing his first race in 1984 and competed intermittently until the mid 1990s when he decided to take the sport more seriously. At the 2011 Ironman World Championship in Kona, Hawaii, United States, Uytengsu set a personal best. He is credited for bringing the Ironman Triathlon, XTERRA Triathlon and IronKids races to the Philippines.

In 2012, Uytengsu made an $8 million donation to USC. The donation helped fund the reconstruction of USC's swim stadium originally constructed for the 1984 Summer Olympics and opened in July 1983. The new center was named the Uytengsu Aquatics Center which officially opened on February 21, 2014. It is the largest gift to the USC Athletic Department by a former student-athlete.

== Alaska Aces ==
Through the efforts of Uytengsu, Alaska Milk Corporation organized the Alaska Aces basketball team which competed in the Philippine Basketball Association from 1986 until 2022. The Aces won 14 PBA championships in 36 years.

During his tenure as team owner, Uytengsu spoke his mind, particularly on instances of trades he believed to be dubious and caused disparity and unlevel playing field.

== Honors ==
At the 2016 PSA Annual Awards, Uytengsu was named PSA Executive of Year for his contribution to the promotion of various sports in the Philippines such as basketball, triathlon and football.

From the PBA Press Corps, Uytengsu has received two Danny Floro Executive of the Year awards (1998 and 2010) and became the first Lifetime Achievement Award recipient (2018).
