= Electronic reloading =

Process of adding minutes to a prepaid mobile phone without using cards

With prepaid mobile phone service, topping-up or reloading is needed to continue using the services of the operator. There are several ways to reload a prepaid mobile phone. The most common approach involves purchasing a prepaid card. However, due to security concerns and for added convenience, electronic reloading has been developed.

== Development ==
The technology of electronic reloading was first introduced in the Philippines by Smart Communications as SmartLoad and is considered to be the world's first electronic reloading service. This service offered micro top-ups, allowing prepaid subscribers to add credit in small denominations. The service gained popularity and soon other service providers also adopted the technology, offering prepaid top-ups to its subscribers. SmartLoad was followed by a rival company, Globe Telecom, which introduced an enhanced version of the top-up service called AutoloadMax or simply AMAX.

== Benefits ==
Retailers and prepaid phone subscribers both benefit from electronic reloading services.

=== Security ===
Electronic reloading does not require the transfer of any actual physical prepaid cards. This means there are no more cards to keep or safeguard against theft.

=== Cost-effective ===
Electronic transactions negate the need to incur costs related to transportation, warehousing, or other incidental expenses, thereby preserving the retailer's profits, as all transactions are conducted electronically.

=== Convenience ===
Prepaid credits are loaded automatically to the subscriber's account. This process eliminates long lines and the need to key in PINs.

== Channels of reloading ==
=== Reloading stations ===
Prepaid phone subscribers can top up their airtime balances via electronic reloading stations. These stations or retailers use a Retailer SIM card to top up prepaid credits on a subscriber's mobile phone. This SIM card functions similarly to commercially available prepaid SIM cards but with additional reloading/top-up functionality. It employs click-and-browse SIM technology for hassle-free transactions.

A retailer inputs the number of the mobile phone to be reloaded and selects either the denomination of the airtime balance or a pre-subscribed prepaid offer. These offers may include call and text promos (e.g., Smart AllNet30), mobile internet promos (e.g., Smart Giga Video 50), and prepaid broadband offer top-ups such as FamLoad Video for Smart Bro Home WiFi.

The airtime balance reload is then deducted from the retailer's commercial load credits, which can be replenished at a network's wireless centers. However, in some cases in the Philippines, Smart Stores may not offer this method of reloading, favoring Machine Topup or Scratch Cards (locally called Prepaid Vouchers). The commercial load is the prepaid airtime balance used for reloading a prepaid SIM card and is distinct from the retailer's personal load balance.

Becoming a retailer is accessible to many, as service providers sell retailer SIM cards without requiring additional contracts. As a result, reloading stations are widespread in places like the Philippines, where they are found in every city block and even in the most remote areas.

=== Load transfer ===
Following the success of electronic reloading, Smart Communications, the company that introduced the service, also developed a load transfer service for prepaid subscribers. This service utilizes the same technology as reloading stations but employs a different method. To transfer credit, a prepaid subscriber needs to enter the mobile number of the recipient and send it to an access number designated by the service provider. Load transfers are limited to small denominations and expire 24 hours after the transfer is made.

The SMS-based and USSD-based Globe Share-A-Load was discontinued on December 1, 2022.

=== Reward points ===
Electronic reloading can also be accomplished through reward points redemption. Service providers award subscribers with points that accumulate whenever they use or purchase any value-added service. These points can then be used to purchase electronic loads and other services, depending on the number of points earned. Dito Telecommunity, for instance, offers electronic reloading using earned reward points as a mode of payment through their mobile app.

=== Automated teller machines ===
Banks support reloading services via automated teller machines. A menu for reloading is added to the ATM and can be used by any person with an ATM card. The denomination reloaded to a prepaid mobile phone is deducted from the bank account balance of the ATM card used.

The reloading of prepaid mobile phone via ATM was discontinued by Philippine National Bank (PNB) on December 1, 2025.

=== E-wallet apps ===
Most E-wallet apps in the Philippines such as GCash, Maya, and Coins.ph, and among others do support reloading services. Like reloading via ATMs, the denomination reloaded to a prepaid mobile phone is deducted from the e-wallet account balance.

=== Other subscriptions ===
Electronic reloads can also be offered from other subscriptions from a network provider. One example is through a prepaid mobile broadband subscription. Service providers have designed a way to incorporate reloading functions of mobile broadband. However these services are only marketed for personal use since the idea is fleshed out from the load transfer service.

== Branding ==
In the Philippines, service providers use different branding for the electronic reload service. Smart Communications, who owns Smart and TNT, use SmartLoad, while Globe Telecom, who owns Globe, TM, GOMO, (the defunct Cherry Prepaid and the defunct ABS-CBNmobile), use AutoloadMax or simply AMAX in branding of the service. The defunct Sun Cellular used XpressLoad as its branding for that service.
