= Elma Muros =

Filipino long jumper

Personal information
- Full name: Elma Muros-Posadas
- Nationality: Filipino
- Born: Elma Tansingco Muros; January 14, 1967 (age 59) Magdiwang, Romblon, Philippines
- Height: 5 ft 4 in (163 cm)
- Spouse: George Posadas

Sport
- Country: Philippines
- Sport: Track and field
- Events: Long jump, Heptathlon

Achievements and titles
- Personal best: 57.57 (400 hurdles)
Medal record
Representing Philippines
Women's athletics
Event	1st	2nd	3rd
Asian Games	-	-	2
Asian Athletics Championships	-	2	2
Southeast Asian Games	15	1	2
Total	15	3	6
Asian Games
Bronze medal – third place	1990 Beijing	400 m hurdles
Bronze medal – third place	1994 Hiroshima	Long jump
Asian Athletics Championships
Silver medal – second place	1983 Kuwait	Long jump
Silver medal – second place	1989 Delhi	Long jump
Bronze medal – third place	1993 Manila	Long jump
Bronze medal – third place	1995 Jakarta	Long jump
Southeast Asian Games
Gold medal – first place	1983 Singapore	Long Jump
Gold medal – first place	1985 Bangkok	Long Jump
Gold medal – first place	1989 Kuala Lumpur	100m Hurdles
Gold medal – first place	1989 Kuala Lumpur	Long Jump
Gold medal – first place	1991 Manila	Long Jump
Gold medal – first place	1991 Manila	100m Hurdles
Gold medal – first place	1993 Singapore	Long Jump
Gold medal – first place	1993 Singapore	400m Hurdles
Gold medal – first place	1995 Chiang Mai	100m
Gold medal – first place	1995 Chiang Mai	200m
Gold medal – first place	1995 Chiang Mai	Long Jump
Gold medal – first place	1997 Jakarta	Long Jump
Gold medal – first place	1997 Jakarta	Heptathlon
Gold medal – first place	1999 Brunei	Long Jump
Gold medal – first place	2001 Kuala Lumpur	Heptathlon
Silver medal – second place	1981 Manila	4x100 Relay
Bronze medal – third place	1987 Jakarta	Long Jump
Bronze medal – third place	1991 Manila	100m

Elma Muros-Posadas (born January 14, 1967, in Magdiwang, Romblon) also known as the "Long Jump Queen" of the Philippines and a heptathlon champion, is a former member of the Philippine Track and Field National Team and now a legend in Philippine track and field history who specialized in long jump. She also competed in the heptathlon, 100m and 400m hurdles, 100m, 200m, and 400m sprint alongside the "Sprint Queen" of the Philippines and also fellow legend, Lydia de Vega. Elma is one of the foremost track and field athletes produced by the Philippines under the Marcos regime's National Sports Program, Gintong Alay, that was launched in 1979, but was eventually disbanded in 1986 after the ousting of Ferdinand Marcos and replaced by the Philippine Sports Commission (PSC) in 1990.

== Early life and education ==
Elma Muros was born on January 14, 1967, in the town of Magdiwang, Romblon in Sibuyan Island. She is the 6th eldest child in a brood of nine. Her mother is a former athlete who competed in the 400 meter sprint in her youth. She attended the Roosevelt College in Rizal under a scholarship granted by then Rizal governor Isidro Rodriguez. Later on, she was granted a scholarship in University of Baguio, then soon after transferred out to Far Eastern University.

== Career ==
Muros is involved in track and field competitively as early as when she was 14 years old. At that time, she was scouted by local officials looking for potential athletes for the Southern Tagalog Regional Athletics Association sporting meet.

Muros-Posadas won a total of 15 gold medals in the Southeast Asian Games, a record number in the athletics competition which she jointly holds with Jennifer Tin Lay of Myanmar.

Muros won eight South East Asian Games titles in the long jump the first at the age of 16 in 1983. At one point, she also dominated the sprints winning both the 100 and 200 metres in the 1995 Southeast Asian Games.

She was also a competitor for the Philippines in the long jump event at the Olympic Games in 1984 and 1996. She represented her country at the World Championships in Athletics on four occasions: in the 400 m hurdles in 1991, the long jump in 1993 and 1995, and the 100 metres in 1997. She was also a five-time participant at the IAAF World Indoor Championships, competing in 1985, 1989, 1993, 1995 and 1997 in sprints and long jump.

She was a two-time medallist at the Asian Games, taking the long jump bronze medal at the 1994 Games as well as a 400 metres hurdles bronze medal in 1990. She won four medals in the long jump at the Asian Athletics Championships over the course of her career, winning silver medals in 1983 and 1989, then bronze medals at the 1993 and 1995 editions.

She holds several Filipino records: 57.57 seconds for the 400 m hurdles, 5346 points for the heptathlon (set at the 1998 Asian Games), 3:40.9 minutes for the 4×400 metres relay, 25.05 seconds for the indoor 200 metres and 6.11 m for the indoor long jump.

She was a two-time PSA Athlete of the Year, winning the award in 1993 and 1995. She attended Far Eastern University in Manila.

Since her retirement in 2001, Muros-Posadas has appeared several times on the reality television show Survivor Philippines. In 2011, Elma landed a role in her very own biographical and loosely-based independent movie directed by Paul Soriano, Thelma, who won best director in the 30th Luna Awards with his direction in this movie. Elma's life and a combination of many provincial athletes and their lives and struggles were portrayed by Maja Salvador, who won Best Actress in the 30th Luna Awards played the titular role for Thelma. The movie won Best Screenplay and Best Cinematography in the same awards.

On April 23, 2017, Elma received the first-ever Palarong Pambansa Lifetime Achievement Award during the national games’ opening ceremony. According to Rappler's Fidel Feria's article, Department of Education Assistant Secretary, Tonsito Umali said that the "8-time gold medalist for long-jump in the Southeast Asian Games – was chosen by virtue of her winning “local and international competitions, and for inspiring local athletes” through her success."

In 2016, Muros was reported to be working at Brent International School in Biñan, Laguna, University of the East and Jose Rizal University where she along with her husband train the youth in sports. In early 2017, Muros along with former boxer Onyok Velasco was tasked by the Philippine Sports Commission to aid the country's grassroots program.

== Personal life ==
Elma is married to George "Jojo" Posadas, an Ilonggo coach of the Philippine athletics team with whom she has a daughter and a son. Muros-Posadas took a break from sports, opting to skip the 1992 Olympics in Barcelona, Spain due to her first pregnancy and the birth of her only daughter. Elma's first born, Klarrizze (b. 1992), a former student in Brent International School was also athletic and not only excelled in track and field, but also participated and competed internationally in multiple sports such as cross country, basketball, soccer, and volleyball. Up to this day, she still holds the grade school and high school track records in the said school.

In later years, Klarrizze pursued basketball and received a full athletic scholarship in the Ateneo De Manila University. Klarrizze was part of the UAAP Women's Basketball Lady Eagles Team for four seasons (2012–2016). Muros-Posadas' daughter obtained her bachelor's degree in Psychology and is now a preschool teacher. Eleven years after the birth of Elma's first child, she gave birth to her son, George Michael Jr. (b. 2003) who is now also a student in Brent International School and is active and excels in sports as well. Presently, they are residents of Santa Rosa, Laguna.
