= 2017 PSA Annual Awards =

- Date: February 13, 2017
- Location: Le Pavillion, Pasay
- Country: Philippines
- Hosted by: Quinito Henson; Patricia Bermudez-Hizon; Carla Lizardo; Steph Ongkiko

Television/radio coverage
- Runtime: 2 hours

The 2017 PSA Annual Awards was an awards ceremony, recognizing the sports athletes, personalities, organizations and NSAs for the year 2016. It was organized by the Philippine Sportswriters Association, the Philippines' oldest media organization, founded in 1949, with members composed of sports section editors, sportswriters and sports columnists from major national broadsheets, tabloids and online sports news portals. The PSA is currently headed by Riera Mallari, sports editor of the Manila Standard.

The awards night took place at the Le Pavillon, Pasay on February 13, 2017, at 7:30 p.m. (UTC +08). The awards night was hosted by veteran sports broadcaster Quinito Henson and Sports5 head Patricia Bermudez-Hizon with Carla Lizardo and Steph Ongkiko as the co-hosts. Philippine Sports Commission Chairman William "Butch" Ramirez and Philippine Olympic Committee President Jose "Peping" Cojuangco, Jr. and other top sports officials were invited to the event.

2016 Summer Olympics silver medalist Hidilyn Diaz of Weightlifting has named as the PSA Athlete of the Year. She was unanimously chosen by the members of the PSA and beat two other names in the organization's shortlist for the coveted award, Janelle Mae Frayna of Chess and Sen. Manny Pacquiao of boxing. Diaz, who is first Female athlete to win the Athlete of the Year award since 2012 will lead the 91 awardees of the event.

== Honor roll ==
=== Main awards ===
The following are the list of main awards of the event.

Award	Winner	Sport/Team/Recognition	References
Athlete of the Year	Hidilyn Diaz	Weightlifting (2016 Rio Olympics silver medalist)	
Lifetime Achievement Award	Eugene Torre	Chess (2016 World Chess Olympiad bronze medalist)	
President's Award	Milo Rivera	International Motorsports (2016 FIA Gymkhana Champion)	
Executive of the Year	Philip Ella Juico	Athletics/Track and Field (President, PATAFA)	
National Sports Association of the Year	Philippine Athletics Track and Field Association (PATAFA)	Athletics/Track and Field	
Mr. Basketball	June Mar Fajardo	Professional basketball (San Miguel – PBA)	
Mr. Football	Misagh Bahadoran	Football (Global FC & Philippines national team,)	
Mr. Golf	Miguel Tabuena	Golf (first Filipino golfer to join the golf competition of the Olympics)	
Mr. Taekwondo	Jeordan Dominguez	Taekwondo (World Taekwondo Poomsae Chmps. over-17 male individual event and 4th Asian Taekwondo Poomsae Chmps. individual freestyle event gold medalist)	
Ms. Volleyball	Mika Reyes	Volleyball (DLSU – UAAP / F2 Logistics – PSL / PSL F2 Logistics-Manila – 2016 FIVB WCWC)	
Stars of the Night	Ancilla Mari Manzano; Khazart William Khaz Romoff	Gymnastics; Karting	

=== Major awardees ===
These are the major awardees of the event. Sorted in alphabetical order.

Winner	Sport/Team/Recognition	References
Eduard Folayang	Mixed Martial Arts (ONE Championship world lightweight champion)	
Eric Cray	Athletics (Philippine delegate to the 2016 Summer Olympics)	
Ian Lariba	Table Tennis (Philippine delegate to the 2016 Summer Olympics)	
Janelle Mae Frayna	Chess (First Filipina woman chessgrandmaster)	
Jeron Teng	Collegiate basketball (DLSU Green Archers / UAAP Season 79 Men's Basketball Finals MVP)	
John Riel Casimero	Boxing (IBF Flyweight world champion)	
Josephine Medina	Table Tennis (2016 Rio Paralympics bronze medalist)	
Kirstie Alora	Taekwando (Philippine delegate to the 2016 Summer Olympics)	
“Low Profile”	Horse racing (Horse of the Year / 41st PCSO Presidential Gold Cup winner)	
Marestella Torres-Sunang	Long jump (Philippine delegate to the 2016 Summer Olympics)	
Mark A. Alvarez	Horse racing (Jockey of the Year / Winning rider of “Low Profile”)	
Marvin Mangulabnan	Superbike racing (Philippine Superbike overall champion)	
Mary Joy Tabal	Marathon (Philippine delegate to the 2016 Summer Olympics)	
Nestor Colonia	Weightlifting (Philippine delegate to the 2016 Summer Olympics)	
Philippine poomsae team (incl. Jean Pierre Sabido, Ernesto Guzman Jr., Jeordan Dominguez, and Glenn Lava)	Poomsae (10th World Taekwondo Poomsae Championships gold medalists)	
San Miguel Beermen	Professional basketball (2015-16 PBA Philippine Cup champions)	
Yuka Saso	Golf (World Junior Girls Championship team gold medalist)	

=== Citations ===
Winner	Sport/Team/Recognition	References
Pocari Sweat Lady Warriors	Volleyball (Shakey's V-League Open and Reinforced Conferences champion)	
Jerwin Ancajas	Boxing (IBF World Super Flyweight champion)	
Marlon Tapales	Boxing (WBO Bantamweight World champion)	
Brandon Vera	Mixed Martial Arts (ONE Championship heavyweight champion)	
Philippines national dragon boat team (PCKDF)	Dragon boat	
Divine Wally	Wushu	
Ariel Mandal	Wushu	
Gretchen Abaniel	Boxing	
Annie Ramirez	Jiu-jitsu (Asian Beach Games gold medalist)	
Maggie Ochoa	Jiu-jitsu (Asian Beach Games gold medalist)	
Pauline Lopez	Taekwando	
Rogen Ladon	Boxing	
Charly Suarez	Boxing	
Ernest John Obiena	Pole Vault	
Chezka Centeno	Billiards	
Criztian Pitt Laurente	Boxing	
Ariana Thea Patrice Dormitorio	Mountain biking	
Sofia Chabon	Golf	
Bernice Olivarez-Ilas	Golf	
Joseph Myers	Jiu-jitsu	
Orencio James delos Santos	Karatedo	
Jason Ang	Karting	
Kenneth San Andres	Motocross	
Juvenile Faye Crisostomo	Poomsae	
Patrick John Tierro	Tennis	
Monica Torres	Triathlon	
August Benedicto	Triathlon	
Ramon “Tats” Suzara	Volleyball (President, Philippine Super Liga)	
Johnny Tan	Motorsports (Owner of Clark International Speedway)	
NU Lady Bulldogs	Women's Basketball	
NU Pep Squad	Cheerdance	
RC Cola-Army Lady Troopers	Volleyball	
Philippines national fencing team	Fencing	
Standard Insurance Centennial national sailing team	Sailing	
Philippines national sepak takraw team	Sepak Takraw	
Philippine Canoe Kayak Federation	Canoe, Kayak and Dragonboat	
United Football League	Football	
Milo Best Center Women's Volleyball League	Volleyball	
Pru Life UK	Football grassroots	
TV5/Sports5	Sports broadcasting	
UNTV	Sports broadcasting (UNTV Cup)	

=== Milo Junior Athletes of the Year ===
Award	Winner	Sport/Team/Recognition	References
Milo Male Junior Athlete of the Year	Adam Bondoc	Karate	
Milo Female Junior Athlete of the Year	Kyla Soguilon	Swimming	

=== Tony Siddayao Awards for Under-17 athletes ===
The awards was given to young and exceptional athletes aged 17 and below, and was named after Siddayao, the former sports section editor of Manila Standard in the 1980s.

Winner	Sport/Team/Recognition	References
Micaela Mojdeh	Swimming	
Marc Dula	Swimming	
Jerard Jacinto	Swimming	
Maurice Sacho Illustre	Swimming	
Ancilla Mari Manzano	Gymnastics	
Khaz Romoff	Karting	
Arielle Pascual	Skating	
Tara Borlan	Triathlon	
Samantha Borlan	Triathlon	
Joan Masangkay	Powerlifting	

=== Posthumous awards ===
The award were given to Philippine sports personalities who died in 2016. They will give a trophy and a one-minute of silence for all honorees.

- Emy Arcilla (PBA television coverage analyst)
- Gilbert Bulawan (Blackwater Elite basketball player)
- Benjie Castro (Sports Radio 918 broadcaster and voice-over talent)
- Filomeno Codiñera (Filipino baseball and softball player; 2016 PSA lifetime achievement awardee)
- Virgilio "Baby" Dalupan (Filipino basketball head coach; known as "The Maestro")
- Cecil Hechanova (Philippine Sports Commission chairman, 1990–1992)
- Carlos "Caloy" Loyzaga (Philippines' national men's basketball team player; two-time Olympian)
- Rogie Maglinas (UP Fighting Maroons football player)
- Jonas Mariano (former La Salle basketball player)
- Ronnie Nathanielsz (veteran sports broadcaster and columnist)
- Mariano "Tom" Ong (Filipino sports shooter; two time Olympian)
- Hermie Rivera (Boxing analyst and manager)

== See also ==
- 2016 in Philippine sports
