= Palawan Pawnshop =

Philippine non-banking financial services institution

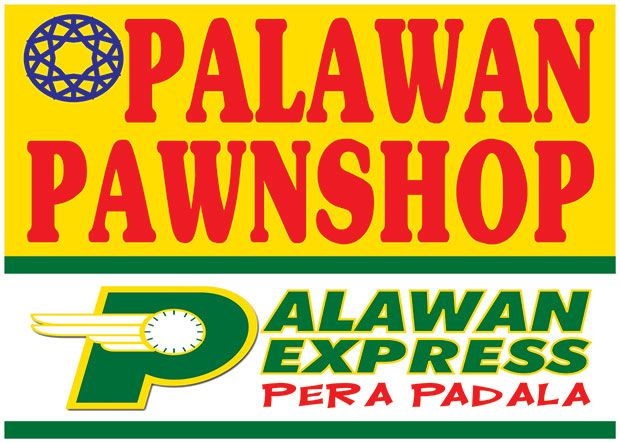
- Founded: August 17, 1985; 40 years ago in Puerto Princesa, Palawan, Philippines
- Founders: Bobby Lopez Castro; Angelita Maligalig-Castro
- Headquarters: Puerto Princesa, Palawan, Philippines
- Area served: Nationwide
- Key people: Bobby Castro (Chairman) Karlo Eugene Joseph Maligalig-Castro (President and CEO) Angelita Maligalig-Castro (Vice President)
- Products: Insurance
- Services: Pawn-broking; money remittance; bills payment; corporate payout; collections; electronic reloading
- Subsidiaries: Eight Under Par (Pawnshop Operator), Inc.; Palawan Pawnshop Inc.; Paragua Pawnshop and Financial Services Inc.; VG Star Pawnshop & Jewelry Corporation
- Website: www.palawanpawnshop.com

Palawan Pawnshop – Palawan Express Pera Padala is a Philippine-based pawnshop and non-banking financial institution offering services such as pawn-broking, money remittance, insurance, bills payment, remit-to-account, corporate payout, collections, and electronic reloading. It is headquartered in Puerto Princesa, Palawan.

== History ==
It was founded in 1985, originally owned by the Rodriguez family, with the intention of providing cash-based financial assistance to the common folk of Puerto Princesa. It would later be acquired by spouses Bobby Castro and the former Angelita Maligalig, two former activists and both coming from a military family background. Bobby had wanted to establish a business portfolio of his own apart from managing his father's business. After acquiring the business from the Rodriguez family for ₱40 thousand, its first outlet was established along Malvar Street in the city.

In 2021, digital cross-border payment service WorldRemit partnered with Palawan Pawnshop to increase its remittance network.

In the beginning of 2024, Castro's eldest son Karlo took over as President and CEO. However, he stayed on to become the Chairman of the Palawan Pawnshop Group.
