= Philippine Navy Cycling Team =

Philippine Navy
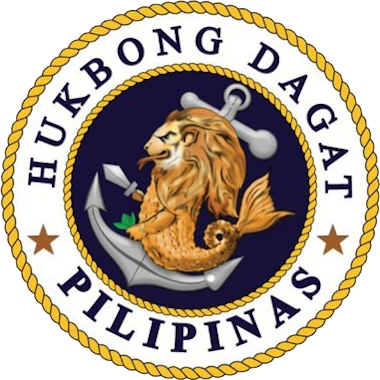

Team information
- UCI code: PNSI
- Registered: Philippines

The Philippine Navy Cycling Team, also known as Philippine Navy–Standard Insurance due to sponsorship reasons, is a cycling team based in the Philippines.

Managed by the Philippine Navy, the team is unable to turn to a UCI Continental since the Armed Forces of the Philippines General Headquarters does not allow military personnel to have frequent overseas trips. The team is also sponsored by Standard Insurance Group headed by chairman Ernesto Echauz who is also a sports patron who supports sailing. Consequentially, the team also have employees from Standard among its ranks.

The team is a frequent competitor in the Le Tour de Filipinas and the Ronda Pilipinas. Many of the Philippine Navy's members has also become part of the Philippine national team.

== Team roster ==
As of May 12, 2023.

Rider	Date of birth
John Mark Camingao (PHI)	September 1, 1993 (age 33)
El Joshua Carino (PHI)	January 25, 1993 (age 33)
Esteve Hora (PHI)	–
Jeremy Lizardo (PHI)	–

Rider	Date of birth
Ronald Lomotos (PHI)	July 8, 1994 (age 32)
Junrey Navarra (PHI)	February 1, 1992 (age 34)
George Oconero (PHI)	February 8, 1992 (age 34)
Ronald Oranza (PHI)	December 2, 1992 (age 33)
Jan Paul Morales (PHI)	January 28, 1986 (age 40)

== Major wins ==
2017
Overall, Ronda Pilipinas, Jan Paul Morales

Sprint and King of the Mountain, Jan Paul Morales

2018
Overall, Ronda Pilipinas, Ronald Oranza
Overall, Tour de Filipinas, El Joshua Cariño
2020
Overall, Ronda Pilipinas, George Oconer
2022
Overall, Ronda Pilipinas, Ronald Lomotos
