= Philsilat Sports Association =

- Sport: Pencak silat
- Jurisdiction: Philippines
- Founded: 2014
- Affiliation: International Pencak Silat Association
- President: Princess Jacel Kiram
- Replaced: Philippine Pencak Silat Association
- (founded): 1990

Official website
- philsilat.org
- (Philippines)

The Philsilat Sports Association Inc. (PSAI) is the national governing body for pencak silat in the Philippines. It is accredited by the International Pencak Silat Federation which is the governing body for the sport in the world.

== History ==
The history of organized pencak silat in the Philippines traces back as early as 1990 when the Philippine Pencak Silat Association was established by Jamalul Kiram III.

The federation was succeeded by the PhilSilat Sports Association, Inc. which was established on July 8, 2014 by Jamalul's wife Celia Fatima Kiram.
