= Philippine Bowling Federation =

- Sport: Bowling
- Jurisdiction: Philippines
- Abbreviation: PBF
- Founded: 2016
- Affiliation: International Bowling Federation
- Affiliation date: 2016
- President: Jinggay Facuri
- Secretary: Gina Avecilla
- Coach: Jojo Canare
- (Philippines)

The Philippine Bowling Federation (PBF) is a duly-accredited governing body of Tenpin Bowling in the Philippines. PBF is currently recognized by the Philippine Olympic Committee, Philippine Sports Commission, Asian Bowling Federation, and International Bowling Federation.

== History ==
In 2016, the Philippine Bowling Federation Inc. "PBF" replaced the now-defunct Philippine Bowling Congress PBC as the appointed member of the international bowling federation World Bowling, Asian Bowling Federation Philippine Olympic Committee (POC).

PBF was a predecessor of PBC, founded initially by Ernesto "Toti" Lopa in 1968 and registered with SEC in 2016. Headed by pillars of Philippine bowling, such as Former national bowler, incumbent Senator Vicente Sotto III is the federation's Chairman, Steve Robles is currently its president, and Secretary General is Olivia "Bong" Coo.[3] Paeng Nepomuceno, also a PBF Trustee led the coaching staff of the Philippine national bowling team. Other founders are world champion Biboy Rivera, Asian champion Rene Reyes. With original Philippine Bowling Congress Inc. incorporator Cas King, Alex Lim, Stephen Hontiveros, Salome Lopa and Gina Avecilla. Athletes, coaches, proprietors, seniors, and the youth are all represented in PBF, which is the current objective of the International Bowling Federation.

In March 2016, the POC appointed Paeng Nepomuceno as the head coach of the Philippine national bowling team. With Paeng, the only Asian Gold level coach of USBC as head coach, supported by World Champion Biboy Rivera, SEAG Masters Champion Jojo Canare, longtime coach Johnson Cheng and Rey Reyes, PBF boast of a team of 100% Filipino coaches who now conducts regular seminars and training.

The federation's first tournament was the 2016 PBF National Championships at the Coronado Lanes, Mandaluyong on December 3–4, 2016 which was attended by top PBF officials who are also doing the ceremonial serve before the start of the competition.

In May, 2016, PBF coaches Paeng, Biboy Rivera and Jojo Canare were invited to the second World Bowling Coach Conference held at the International Training & Research Center in Arlington, Texas where bowling coaches from around the world participated to synchronize and advance the sport worldwide.

PBF hosted The Philippine International Open in 2017, 2018 and 2019 at the Coronado Lanes in Starmall Edsa Mandaluyong. The event is an Asian Bowling Federation ranking. it was participated in by bowlers from host Philippines, Australia, Bahrain, Hong Kong, India, Indonesia, Kingdom of Saudi Arabia, Korea, Kuwait, Malaysia, Singapore, United Arab Emirates, Guam U.S.A. and Filipino bowlers residing or working overseas. PBF also hosted The 19th Asian Youth Tenpin Bowling Championships in October 2017 at Corodano Lanes, Starmall EDSA in Mandaluyong. The tournament returned to the Philippines after 19 years.

In 2017, PBF has produced the first ever silver medals in the Asian Indoor and Martial Arts Games (AIMAG) in Ashgabat courtesy of Kenneth Chua in Men Singles and in Women Team of Five and after 39 years the Philippines regained the QubicaAmf Bowling World Cup Women's title with Krizziah Tabora in Hermosillo, Mexico.

PBF also hosted 19th Asian Youth Tenpin Bowling Championships in October 2017 at Corodano Lanes, Starmall EDSA in Mandaluyong. The tournament returned to the Philippines after 19 years.

Youth Talent The Philippine Bowling Federation has experienced a resurgence in youth talent, marked by significant achievements on the international stage. This new wave of success began with Zach Sales Ramin winning the prestigious Singapore Open in 2023, signaling the potential of the country’s young bowlers. The momentum continued at the Asian Youth Championships, where Zach teamed up with Stephen Diwa, Art Barrientos, and Marc Custodio to secure the team gold medal for the Philippines. Adding to this string of accomplishments, Marc Custodio claimed victory at the Dubai Open 2024, further solidifying the rise of the next generation of Filipino bowlers.

== See also ==
- Philippine Bowling Congress
