= Philippine Tennis Association =

National governing body for tennis

- Sport: Tennis
- Abbreviation: PhilTA
- Founded: 1920
- Affiliation: International Tennis Federation (ITF)
- Affiliation date: 1936
- Regional affiliation: Asia (ATF)
- President: Eric Olivarez
- Secretary: John Rey Tiangco

Official website
- philta.org
- (Philippines)

The Philippine Tennis Association (PhilTA) is the national governing body for tennis in the Philippines. It was founded in 1920 as the Philippine Lawn Tennis Association and joined the International Lawn Tennis Federation in 1936.

== History ==
Philta was led by Salvador Andrada from 1986 to 2007. It was during Andrada's administration that the Andrada Cup was organized from 1989 which lasted until 2019.

Under Andrada's presidency the Philippines upset Japan 3–2, in the 1988 Davis Cup Asia/Oceania Zone. The Philippines also reached the qualifying round of the 1991 Davis Cup World Group played against Sweden.

=== Leadership crisis ===
Edwin Olivarez became Philta president but resigned in July 2016 leading to a leadership crisis. Andrada was elected again as Philta president But Randy Villanueva, Olivarez's vice president disputes the result with the International Tennis Federation recognizing Villanueva as acting president.

In February 2017, another election was held with Andrada not vacating the president role despite alleging to promise to step down. Sponsors also withdrew support from Philta, including Cebuana Lhuillier and Palawan Pawnshop. Andrara resigned in February 27, 2017.

Another contested election was held again in July 2017 where Antonio Cablitas was elected as Philta president. The ITF continues to recognize as Olivarez as president. In January 2018, Olivarez himself was brought in to be part of a committee to draft an amendment to the Philta's bylaws before new elections could be held. Cablitas was also part of the process.

=== Suspension ===
The International Tennis Federation imposed a two-year suspension against PhilTA in late 2020 due to a leadership crisis within the federation failing to tackle its "exclusive membership base". Under the ad hoc administration of the Philippine Olympic Committee, PhilTA's constitution was revised, with nationwide representation now mandated in the organization's board. An election of new officials was held in December 2023. The suspension was lifted on January 21, 2024.

=== Post-reinstatement ===
Philta now led by president Eric Olivarez oversaw the Philippines' return to international competition including the Davis Cup. In 2026, the Philippines hosted its first WTA 125 tournament – the Philippine Women's Open.

== Tournaments ==
- Philippines Open International Championships (until 1978)
- Andrada Cup (1989–2019) – youth tennis tournament
- PCA Open (1982–present) – open tournament hosted by the Philippine Columbian Association, sanctioned by Philta
- Philippine Women's Open (2026–present)

== See also ==
- Philippines Davis Cup team
- Philippines Fed Cup team
