= Yuka Saso =

Filipino-Japanese professional golfer (born 2001)

Yuka Saso 笹生 優花
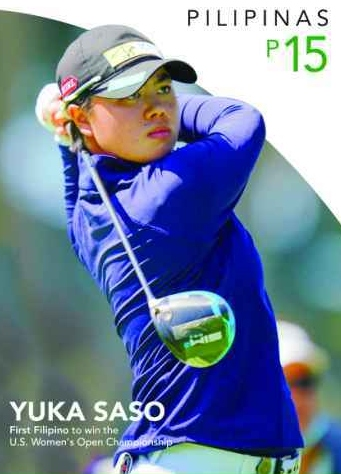

Personal information
- Nationality: Philippines (until October 2021); Japan (November 2021 – present)
- Born: 20 June 2001 (age 25) San Ildefonso, Bulacan, Philippines
- Height: 166 cm (5 ft 5 in)

Career
- Sport: Golf
- Turned professional: 2019
- Current tours: LPGA Tour; LPGA of Japan Tour
- Professional wins: 4

Number of wins by tour
- LPGA Tour: 2
- LPGA of Japan Tour: 2

Best results in LPGA major championships (wins: 2)
- Chevron Championship: T17: 2022
- Women's PGA C'ship: 2nd: 2023
- U.S. Women's Open: Won: 2021, 2024
- Women's British Open: T12: 2026
- Evian Championship: T3: 2023
Medal record
Women's golf
Representing Philippines
Asian Games
Gold medal – first place	2018 Jakarta–Palembang	individual
Gold medal – first place	2018 Jakarta–Palembang	team

Yuka Saso (笹生 優花, Sasō Yūka) (born 20 June 2001) is a Filipino and Japanese professional golfer. Saso was born in the Philippines, competing for the country through 2021, having won the first ever gold medal for the Philippines in both women's individual and women's team event in Asian Games golf competitions. As of 2022, she represents Japan.

== Early life ==
Saso was born on 20 June 2001, to a Filipina mother and a Japanese father. She started training in the sport of golf at the age of eight in 2009. She admired Northern Irish golfer Rory McIlroy as a role model and watched video clips of him as a teenager, modeling her game after his style.

== Amateur career ==
At the 2017 PSA Annual Awards, Saso received an award for winning the gold medal at the 2016 World Junior Girls Championship as well as leading the Philippines to victory in the team event. Saso competed at the 2018 Women's Victorian Open as a part of the 2018 Ladies European Tour and finished at 17th position in the women's individual event.

With Bianca Pagdanganan and Lois Kaye Go, Saso secured an unexpected historic gold medal at the 2018 Asian Games in the women's team event. She also won the women's individual competition, the first Asian Games gold medal for the Philippines in the women's individual event.

Saso also took part in the 2018 Summer Youth Olympics in Buenos Aires, Argentina where she almost won a medal. After the final round of the women's individual competition, two other golfers, Alessia Nobilio of Italy and Emma Spitz of Austria, matched her result of 214 with Kim Grace of Australia winning the gold medal. Saso, Nobilio, and Spitz had to take part in a three-way playoff. Saso narrowly failed to win a medal with Nobilio winning silver and Spitz bronze. Saso also played in the mixed team event pairing with male golfer and compatriot, Carl Jano Corpus.

Saso did not participate in the Southeast Asian Games, opting to skip the regional games due to conflicting schedule in both the 2017 and 2019 editions.

Saso is one of the three Filipino golfers who competed at the 2020 Summer Olympics in Tokyo, Japan. She finished 9th in the women's individual event.

== Professional career ==
Saso turned professional in November 2019 after earning a LPGA of Japan Tour card for 2020. In late June 2020, she made her debut at the Earth Mondahmin Cup in Chiba where she placed fifth.

Saso earned her first victory at the 2020 NEC Karuizawa 72. She then won the next event, the Nitori Ladies Golf Tournament. On June 6, 2021, she won the 2021 U.S. Women's Open in a playoff against Nasa Hataoka, her first major title, becoming the first Filipino to win the tournament. Saso, at age 19 years, 11 months, 17 days, matched Inbee Park (2008 U.S. Women's Open champion) as the youngest golfer to win the tournament.

Starting with the 2022 LPGA Tour, Saso would be representing Japan following her decision to keep her Japanese citizenship as per Japanese law on dual nationality.

Saso won her second U.S. Women's Open in 2024, defeating Hinako Shibuno by three strokes at Lancaster Country Club in Lancaster, Pennsylvania.

== Citizenship ==
Saso held both Japanese and Filipino citizenship but was obligated to renounce one of her two citizenships by the time she turns 22 years old in 2023 as per Japanese nationality law. In November 2021, Saso announced her intention to keep her Japanese citizenship. She had completed the process by January 2022.

Saso has represented the Philippines in international golf competitions until 2021 but started officially competing for Japan in 2022. Saso, however, feels connection to both her Filipino and Japanese heritage.

== Amateur wins ==
- 2014 Sabah International Junior Masters, Visayas Regional Amateur and ALM Tournament
- 2015 Kartini Cup
- 2016 Philippine Junior Amateur, Philippine Junior Amateur Match Play, World Junior Girls Championship
- 2017 Philippine Amateur Open Championship, Philippine Junior Amateur, Philippine Amateur Open Match Play Championship
- 2018 Philippine Ladies Open, Victorian Junior Masters, Thunderbird International Junior, Asian Games (women's individual)
- 2019 Philippine Ladies Open, Girl's Junior PGA Championship

== Professional wins (4) ==
=== LPGA Tour wins (2) ===
Legend
Major championships (2)

No.	Date	Tournament	Winning score	To par	Margin of victory	Runner(s)-up	Winner's share ($)
1	6 Jun 2021	U.S. Women's Open	69-67-71-73=280	−4	Playoff	(Japan) Nasa Hataoka	1,000,000
2	2 Jun 2024	U.S. Women's Open (2)	68-71-69-68=276	−4	3 strokes	(Japan) Hinako Shibuno	2,400,000

LPGA Tour playoff record (1–0)

No.	Year	Tournament	Opponents	Result
1	2021	U.S. Women's Open	(Japan) Nasa Hataoka	Tied two-hole aggregate playoff Won with birdie on third playoff hole: Hataoka: 4-4=8 (E), 4, Saso: 4-4=8 (E), 3

=== LPGA of Japan Tour wins (2) ===
No.	Date	Tournament	Winning score	To par	Margin of victory	Runner(s)-up
1	16 Aug 2020	NEC Karuizawa 72 Golf Tournament	65-72-63=200	−16	4 strokes	(Japan) Saiki Fujita (Japan) Maiko Wakabayashi
2	30 Aug 2020	Nitori Ladies Golf Tournament	67-69-68-71=275	−13	2 strokes	(Japan) Sakura Koiwai

== Major championships ==
=== Wins (2) ===
Year	Championship	54 holes	Winning score	Margin	Runner-up
2021	U.S. Women's Open	1 shot deficit	−4 (69-67-71-73=280)	Playoff^{1}	(Japan) Nasa Hataoka
2024	U.S. Women's Open (2)	3 shots deficit	−4 (68-71-69-68=276)	3 strokes	(Japan) Hinako Shibuno

^{1} Defeated Hataoka in a two-hole aggregate playoff, followed by a sudden-death playoff: Saso (4-4-3=11) and Hataoka (4-4-4=12 )

=== Results timeline ===
Results not in chronological order.

Tournament	2019	2020	2021	2022	2023	2024	2025	2026
Chevron Championship			T50	T17	CUT	T30	CUT	T59
U.S. Women's Open	CUT	T13	1	CUT	T20	1	CUT	CUT
Women's PGA Championship			T21	T30	2	68	T66	CUT
Evian Championship		NT		CUT	T3	CUT	CUT	T65
Women's British Open			T39	CUT	CUT	CUT	CUT	T12

Win
Top 10
Did not play

CUT = missed the half-way cut
NT = no tournament
T = tied

=== Summary ===
Tournament	Wins	2nd	3rd	Top-5	Top-10	Top-25	Events	Cuts made
Chevron Championship	0	0	0	0	0	1	6	4
U.S. Women's Open	2	0	0	2	2	4	8	4
Women's PGA Championship	0	1	0	1	1	2	6	5
The Evian Championship	0	0	1	1	1	1	5	2
Women's British Open	0	0	0	0	0	1	6	2
Totals	2	1	1	4	4	9	31	17

- Most consecutive cuts made – 6 (2020 U.S. Open – 2022 Chevron)
- Longest streak of top-10s – 1 (four times)

== LPGA Tour career summary ==
Year	Tournaments played	Cuts made*	Wins (Majors)	2nd	3rd	Top 10s	Best finish	Earnings (US$)	Money list rank	Scoring average	Scoring rank
2019	1	0	0	0	0	0	CUT	n/a	n/a	74.00	n/a
2020	3	2	0	0	0	0	T13	n/a	n/a	72.40	n/a
2021	10	10	1 (1)	0	0	4	1	1,517,876	6	69.36	4
2022	26	19	0	1	1	4	2	773,294	36	70.73	34
2023	22	17	0	1	2	8	2	1,822,486	9	70.29	14
2024	22	15	1 (1)	0	0	3	1	2,867,618	4	71.19	48
2025	18	5	0	0	0	0	T17	80,760	138	74.33	153
Totals^	98 (2021)	66 (2021)	2 (2)	2	3	19	1	7,062,034	58		

^ Official as of 2025 season
^Includes matchplay and other tournaments without a cut.

== World ranking ==
Position in Women's World Golf Rankings at the end of each calendar year.

Year	Ranking	Source
2016	838	
2017	533	
2018	545	
2019	282	
2020	45	
2021	8	
2022	32	
2023	27	
2024	16	
2025	125	

== Team appearances ==
Amateur

- Patsy Hankins Trophy (representing Asia/Pacific): 2018 (winners)
- Asian Games (representing the Philippines): 2018 (winners)
- Summer Youth Olympics Mixed team event (representing the Philippines): 2018

Professional

- International Crown (representing Japan): 2023

== Awards ==
- PSA Athlete of the Year, 2018 and 2020
