= Ronda Pilipinas =

Race details
- Date: February–March
- Region: Philippines
- English name: Around the Philippines
- Discipline: Road
- Competition: UCI Asia Tour
- Type: Stage race
- Organiser: LBC

History
- First edition: 2011
- Editions: 11 (as of 2019)
- First winner: Santy Barnachea (PHI)
- Most wins: Jan Paul Morales (PHI) (3 wins)
- Most recent: Ronald Lomotos (PHI)

Ronda Pilipinas (Around the Philippines) is an annual professional road cycling competition held usually in the first quarter of the year in the Philippines. It is organized by LBC Express, the leading courier service provider in the country, thru the help of 3Q Sports and sanctioned by the International Cycling Union and the Integrated Cycling Federation of the Philippines (PhilCycling) headed by cycling patron Bambol Tolentino.

It was formed in 2011 with Santy Barnachea as the inaugural champion of the 1,650 km, 12-stage initial bike-a-thon. In 2016, RP will be doing a 3-leg traditional route that covers Luzon, Visayas and Mindanao starting with the Mindanao route from Butuan City to Cagayan de Oro and Malaybalay, Bukidnon on February 20–27, Visayas route from Bago City to Roxas City on March 11–17 and Luzon route from Sta. Rosa Laguna, to Baguio City on April 3–8. The competition will be open for riders that will qualify in the Under 23 and Open Elite divisions.

They will also introduce new innovations including holding a combination of road races, individual time trials, and criterium races per leg. Instead of the overall championship, In order to going with the international trends in multi-stage cycling events, Ronda Pilipinas 2016 will have separate winners for the three legs.

== Past winners ==
Year	Country	Rider	Team
2011	Philippines	Santi Barnachea	
2012	Philippines	Mark Galedo	
2013	Philippines	Irish Valenzuela	
2014	Philippines	Riemon Lapaza	
2015	Philippines	Santi Barnachea	
2016 (1)	Philippines	Jan Paul Morales	
2016 (2)	Philippines	Ronald Oranza	
2016 (3)	Philippines	Jan Paul Morales	
2017	Philippines	Jan Paul Morales	Philippine Navy
2018	Philippines	Ronald Oranza	Philippine Navy
2019	Spain	Francisco Mancebo	Matrix Powertag
2020	Philippines	George Oconer	Philippine Navy
2022	Philippines	Ronald Lomotos	Philippine Navy
