= Bianca Pagdanganan =

Filipino professional golfer

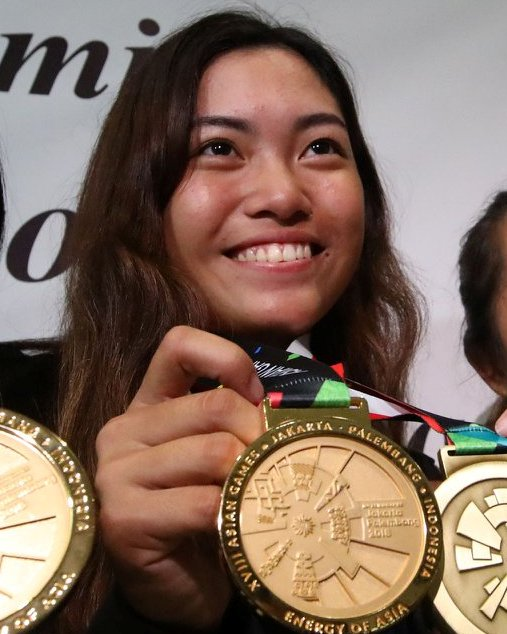
- Pagdanganan in 2018

Personal information
- Full name: Bianca Isabel Pagdanganan
- Nationality: Philippines
- Born: October 28, 1997 (age 29) Quezon City, Philippines
- Height: 167 cm (5 ft 6 in)

Career
- Sport: Golf
- College: Gonzaga University; University of Arizona
- Turned professional: 2020
- Current tour: LPGA Tour
- Professional wins: 1

Best results in LPGA major championships
- Chevron Championship: CUT: 2021, 2024
- Women's PGA C'ship: T9: 2020
- U.S. Women's Open: T49: 2026
- Women's British Open: DNP
- Evian Championship: DNP
Medal record
Women's golf
Representing Philippines
Asian Games
Gold medal – first place	2018 Jakarta–Palembang	team
Bronze medal – third place	2018 Jakarta–Palembang	individual
Southeast Asian Games
Gold medal – first place	2019 Philippines	team
Gold medal – first place	2019 Philippines	individual

Bianca Isabel Pagdanganan (born October 28, 1997) is a Filipino professional golfer. As an amateur, she was a dual medalist in the 2018 Asian Games, winning a bronze in the women's individual event, and a gold medal in the team event with Yuka Saso and Lois Kaye Go.

== Early life and education ==
A native of Quezon City, Pagdanganan was born on October 28, 1997 to Sam and Bing Pagdanganan and has two siblings. She attended the Assumption Antipolo graduating from the institution in 2015. In 2015, Pagdanganan entered the Gonzaga University in the United States to pursue a major degree in sports management. After two years at Gonzaga, Pagdanganan transferred to the University of Arizona.

== Amateur career ==
Pagdanganan was influenced by her father to take up golf. Her father would bring her along his golf sessions during the weekends.

=== Collegiate ===
From 2015 to 2017, Pagdanganan played for the golf team of Gonzaga University. She later represented the University of Arizona and helped the Arizona Wildcats clinch the 2018 NCAA Division I Women's Golf Championships. Her teammates dubbed her as "The Unicorn" for her skills in golf, particularly her long-driving ability. She intends to pursue a professional career in golf after graduating from university.

=== National ===
Prior to moving to the United States, Pagdanganan has competed in national youth tournaments in the Philippines. She won the 2014 Philippine Junior Amateur Open, was a low medalist in the stroke play portion of the 2013 Philippine Amateur Open, and won the 2013 Philippine Ladies Open. She also placed second in the 2012 PHILEX Northern Luzon Regional Amateur Golf Championship and 2013 Philippine Amateur Championship.

=== International ===
Internationally, Pagdanganan competes for the Philippines. In the 2018 Asian Games, she clinched a bronze medal in the women's event and a gold medal in the team event with Yuka Saso and Lois Kaye Go. At the 2019 Southeast Asian Games, she won individual and team gold medals.

At the 2020 Summer Olympics in Tokyo, Pagdanganan ranked 43rd. She later competed at the 2024 Summer Olympics in Paris, where she finished at a joint fourth place with a total stroke count of 282, the best ranking achieved by a Filipino golfer at the Olympics.

== Professional career ==
Pagdanganan turned professional in January 2020. She earned her LPGA Tour card through the LPGA Q-Series in November 2019.

In February 2023, Pagdanganan won the ICTSI Anvaya Cove Ladies International in Morong, Bataan, her first professional victory in the Philippines. She finished at nine-under-par 207 and won by six strokes over P.K. Kongkraphan and Pakin Kawinpakorn. The tournament was part of the Ladies Philippine Golf Tour and was co-sanctioned by the Taiwan LPGA Tour.

== Amateur wins ==
- 2014 Philippine Junior Amateur Open
- 2017 Philippine Ladies Open, Branch Law Firm-Dick McGuire
- 2018 Santi Cup
- 2019 Hawkeye El Tigre Invitational, Southeast Asian Games (gold medal)

== Professional wins (1) ==
=== Taiwan LPGA Tour wins (1) ===
No.	Date	Tournament	Winning score	To par	Margin of victory	Runner(s)-up	Ref.
1	24 Feb 2023	ICTSI Anvaya Cove Ladies International	69-67-71=207	−9	6 strokes	(Thailand) P.K. Kongkraphan, (Thailand) Pakin Kawinpakorn	

== Results in LPGA majors ==
Results not in chronological order.

Tournament	2020	2021	2022	2023	2024	2025	2026
Chevron Championship		CUT			CUT		
U.S. Women's Open	CUT		68				T49
Women's PGA Championship	T9	CUT	T65		T41	T52	
The Evian Championship	NT						
Women's British Open							

Top 10
Did not play

CUT = missed the half-way cut
NT = no tournament
T = tied

== World ranking ==
Position in Women's World Golf Rankings at the end of each calendar year.

Year	Ranking	Source
2020	150	
2021	170	
2022	324	
2023	137	
2024	122	
2025	238	
