= 2016 in the Philippines =

- Decades: 1990s; 2000s; 2010s; 2020s
- See also: List of years in the Philippines; films; music; television; sports

2016 in the Philippines details events that occurred in the Philippines in 2016.

== Incumbents ==
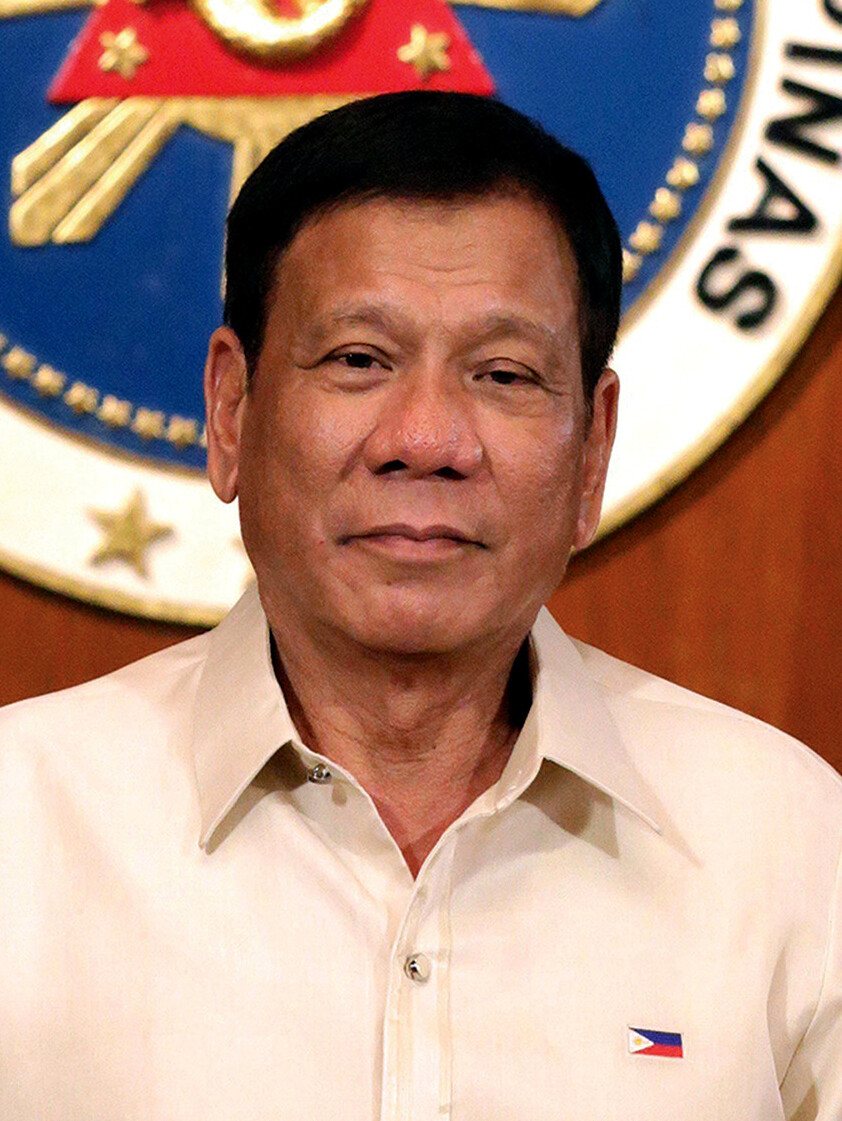
Rodrigo R.
Duterte

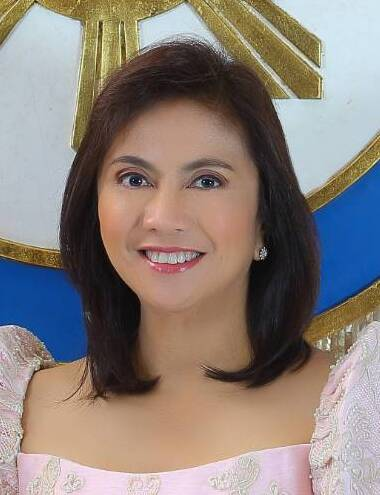
Leni G.
Robredo

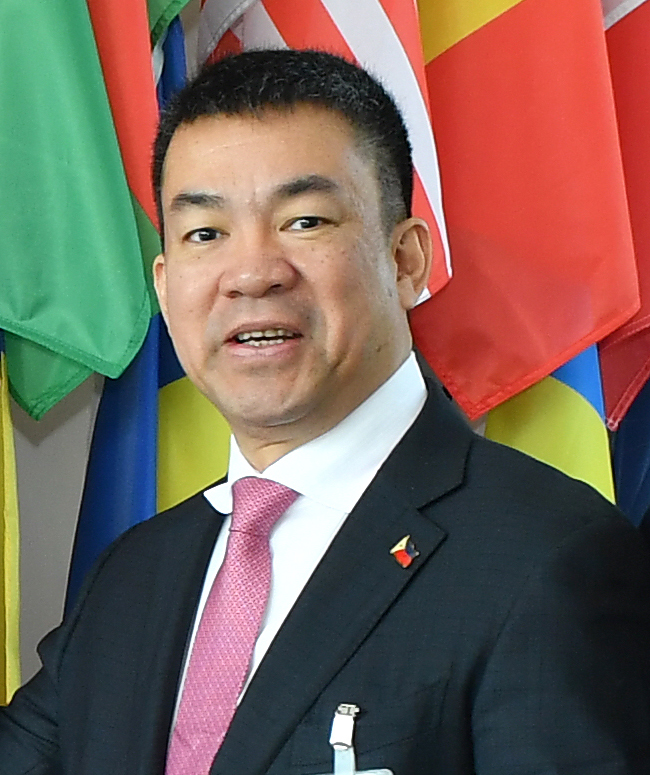
Aquilino M.
Pimentel III

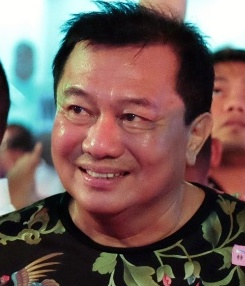
Pantaleon D.
Álvarez

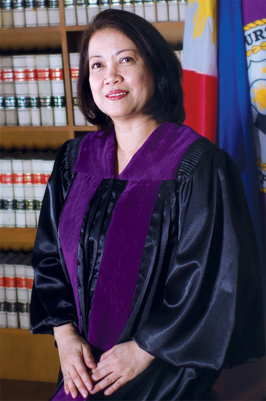
Maria Lourdes
P.A. Sereno

- President:
  - Benigno Aquino III (Liberal) (until June 30)
  - Rodrigo Duterte (PDP–Laban) (from June 30)
- Vice President:
  - Jejomar Binay (UNA) (until June 30)
  - Leni Robredo (Liberal) (from June 30)
- Congress:
  - Senate President:
    - 16th Congress: Franklin Drilon (Liberal) (until July 25)
    - 17th Congress: Aquilino Pimentel III (PDP–Laban) (from July 25)
  - House Speaker:
    - 16th Congress: Feliciano Belmonte Jr. (Liberal) (until July 25)
    - 17th Congress: Pantaleon Alvarez (PDP–Laban) (from July 25)
- Chief Justice: Maria Lourdes Sereno

== Events ==
=== January ===
- January 4 – The Sandiganbayan Special Second Division orders Alfonso Lim Sr., a crony of the late president Ferdinand Marcos, to return to the government all properties he acquired.
- January 7 – The Sandiganbayan Fifth Division denies the bail petition of Senator Jinggoy Estrada in connection with his alleged involvement in the PDAF scam.

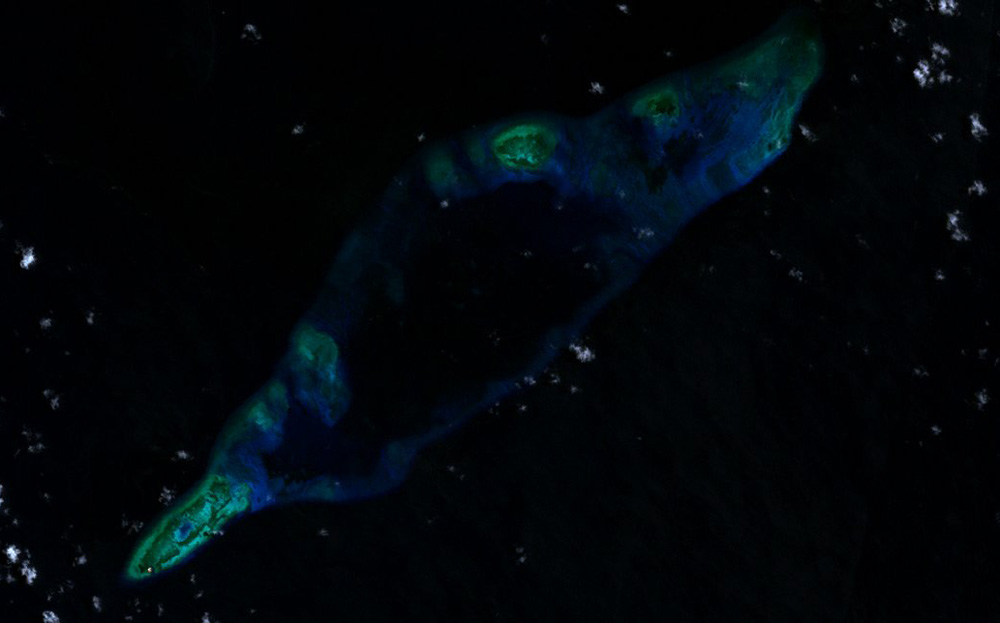
A satellite captured image of the Kagitingan Reef, internationally known as Fiery Cross Reef.

- January 8 – The Department of Foreign Affairs files a diplomatic protest against China's test flights in the Kagitingan Reef located across the disputed South China Sea.
- January 12 – The Supreme Court upholds the constitutionality of the Enhanced Defense Cooperation Agreement between the Philippines and the United States signed in 2014.
- January 13 – Zamboanga City declares a state of calamity due to the onslaught of El Niño phenomenon and its negative effects to the farmlands.
- January 14 – President Aquino vetoes House Bill No. 5842, which intends to increase the pension of the members of Social Security System.
- January 15 – Munap Saimaran, one of the bandits in the 2000 Sipadan kidnappings, is arrested in Sulu.
- January 19:
  - President Aquino approves Republic Act No. 10742 or the SK Reforms Act of 2016 that will enable reforms in strengthening the Sangguniang Kabataan (SK) political system.
  - Cotabato declares a state of calamity after damages due to 2016 El Niño reach over ₱200 million, including damage due to drought and rats.
- January 20:
  - Former Iglesia ni Cristo evangelical worker Lowell Menorca II is arrested by plainclothes Manila Police District officers without a warrant due to libel charges filed by SCAN International Lanao del Norte chapter while trying to attend a hearing in the Court of Appeals. The INC categorically denied the involvement in commotion between the policemen and Menorca. (see 2015 Iglesia ni Cristo leadership controversy)
  - The Office of the Ombudsman orders effectively the dismissal in service of Quezon City District 2 Councilor Roderick Paulate and District 1 Councilor Francisco Calalay and two city liaison officials on the hiring of "ghost employees" in 2010.
- January 21 – Lt. Col. Ferdinand Marcelino, a former official of the Philippine Drug Enforcement Agency's Special Enforcement Service, is arrested in a buy-bust operation at a shabu laboratory in Santa Cruz, Manila.
- January 24–31 – The 51st International Eucharistic Congress is held in Cebu.
- January 26 – The Senate Blue Ribbon subcommittee concludes its hearings on the corruption allegations against Vice President and UNA presidential candidate Jejomar Binay.
- January 27 – The Bangsamoro Basic Law fails to pass on its final reading in the House of Representatives before the end of the 16th Congress due a lack of quorum. Aside from the BBL, Aquino administration's priority bills, the Anti-Dynasty, Anti-Discrimination and the Freedom of Information bills, are effectively "killed" in the 16th Congress as it adjourns in preparation for the 2016 elections.
- January 31 – In a report by the International Federation of Journalists (IFJ), the Philippines places second in the list of most dangerous places for journalists.

=== February ===
- February 1 – The Makati Regional Trial Court Branch 142 issues a warrant of arrest against senator and vice presidential candidate Antonio Trillanes IV over the libel case filed by disqualified Makati mayor Junjun Binay On February 9, Trillanes posted bail.
- February 3 – The COMELEC 1st Division denies all the disqualification cases against PDP–Laban presidential candidate and Davao City Mayor Rodrigo Duterte.
- February 5:
  - The Volunteers Against Crime and Corruption (VACC) files a usurpation case against former PNP Chief Alan Purisima over his involvement in the Mamasapano clash.
  - Maguindanao suffers from the effects of El Niño, destroying rice and corn crops through drought, prompting a food shortage that forces the provincial government to declare a state of calamity.
- February 9 – AFP and PNP operatives arrest Bangsamoro Islamic Freedom Fighters (BIFF) top leader Hassan Indal a.k.a. Abu Hazam in a joint operation in Cotabato City.
- February 10 – The National Mapping and Resource Information Authority announces that it has documented more than 400 additional islands, mostly in the Mindanao group, using the Interferometric Synthetic Aperture Radar. The islands were previously thought to be part of a bigger island. The previous official count was 7,107 by the Gazetteer of the Philippine Islands in 1945.
- February 16 – Six policemen are killed and eight others are wounded in a clash with New People's Army members in Barangay Sta. Margarita, Baggao, Cagayan.
- February 18 – The Department of Transportation and Communications and the Land Transportation Franchising and Regulatory Board launches the P2P or Point to Point Premium Bus, the first bus service in the country accessible for persons with disabilities.
- February 19:
  - President Aquino signs Executive Order 201 (under the proposed Salary Standardization Law of 2015) that increases the salaries of government workers and adding additional benefits to civilian and military uniformed personnel.
  - The Ombudsman files graft and documents falsification charges before the Sandiganbayan against former Makati mayor Junjun Binay and 22 others over the alleged overpriced construction of the Makati City Hall Parking Building II.
- February 26 – At least 60 are killed in an encounter in Butig, Lanao del Sur. Among them are suspected members of the Maute Group and three soldiers.
- February 29:
  - The Philippines and Japan sign an agreement on the transfer of the Japanese defense and surveillance equipment to the AFP.
  - The remains of Elpidio Quirino, the sixth president of the Philippines, are transferred from the Manila South Cemetery to the Libingan ng mga Bayani in Taguig to mark his 60th death anniversary.

=== March ===
- March 1 – Aid al-Qarni, an Islamic preacher, and a diplomat from the Saudi Arabian embassy is shot by a gunman after a lecture in the Western Mindanao State University in Zamboanga City.
- March 3 – The Ombudsman files charges against five former Representatives including former Muntinlupa congressman Ruffy Biazon, in connection with the PDAF scam.
- March 5:
  - The Ombudsman orders the dismissal of Valenzuela City Mayor Rex Gatchalian and 6 others over the blaze that hit the Kentex Manufacturing Corporation and killed at least 72 people in May 2015. On March 15, The Ombudsman also ordered the filing of graft charges against Gatchalian and seven other individuals in connection with this case.
  - The Philippine government impounds a cargo ship from North Korea in the Subic port in response to UN sanctions on North Korea's nuclear program. On March 24, the North Korean freighter M/V Jin Teng has left the country, after no contraband was found onboard and the ship was cleared by the United Nations.

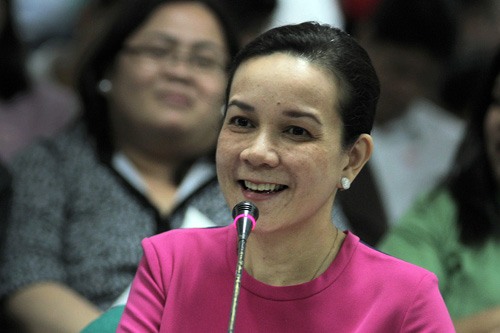
Senator and Presidential candidate Grace Poe-Llamanzares was filed with disqualification cases due to allegations of not meeting the requirements provided by the Constitution.

- March 8 – Voting 9–6, the Supreme Court affirms Grace Poe's natural-born status and declares her eligibility to run based on her 10-year residency.
- March 15:
  - The Supreme Court dismisses several petitions by several party-list groups to issue a TRO to stop the implementation of the K+12 education program of the Department of Education.
  - The Senate Blue Ribbon Committee begins its inquiry into the alleged money laundering scandal involving the transfer of $100 million to a branch of Rizal Commercial Banking Corporation.
- March 16:
  - BIR employee Rhodora Alvarez, the whistleblower of a P1.2 billion helicopter deal in 2013, files a plunder complaint against Defense Secretary Voltaire Gazmin over the anomalous deal.
  - Disqualified Laguna Governor Emilio Ramon "ER" Ejercito and eight other individuals are charged with graft before the Sandiganbayan over an alleged anomalous insurance deal entered in 2008.
- March 18 – Former Camarines Norte Governor Roy Padilla Jr., is arrested over his failure to return a firearm issued to him in 1992.
- March 21 – UNESCO adds Albay as one of the 20 additions to its network of protected biosphere nature reserves.
- March 22:
  - The Sandiganbayan Second Division dismisses the graft case against Government Service Insurance System (GSIS) former president and general manager Winston Garcia on the alleged anomalous awarding of a multimillion-peso electronic membership card (e-Card) project in 2004.
  - The Court of Appeals junks dismissed Makati mayor Junjun Binay's contempt charges against former interior secretary Mar Roxas, Ombudsman Conchita Carpio Morales, former justice Secretary Leila de Lima, and five others.

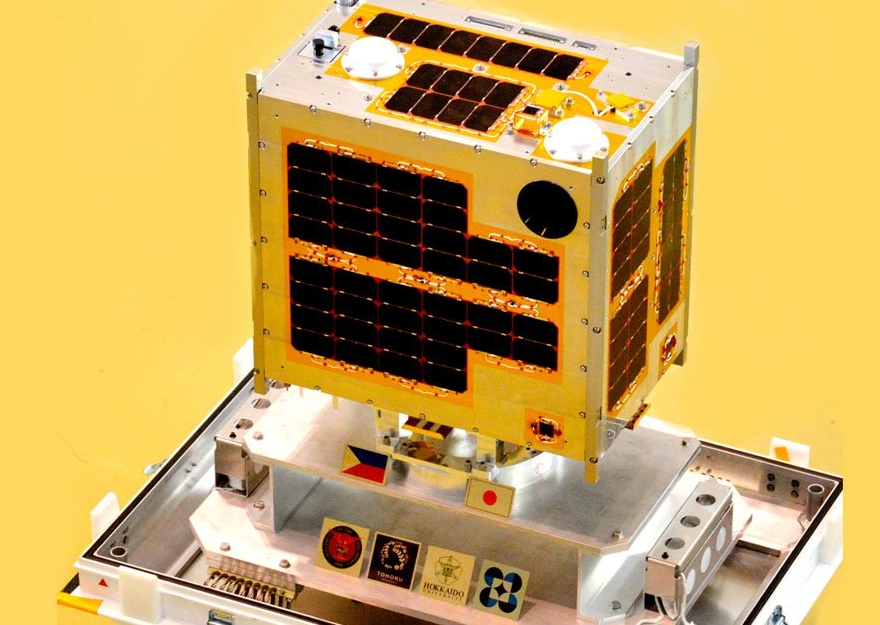
Diwata-1, the first Philippine satellite built and designed by Filipino scientists.

- March 23:
  - Diwata-1 is launched to the International Space Station (ISS) aboard the Cygnus spacecraft on a supply mission. Cygnus itself is launched using the Atlas V rocket. The satellite is deployed into orbit from the ISS on April 27. Diwata-1 is the country's first micro-satellite and the first satellite to be built and designed by Filipinos.
  - The National Task Force is created for the West Philippine Sea (under the Memorandum Circular 94) that aimed at "achieving unified action" as part of efforts to find a resolution to the country's territorial dispute with China in the South China Sea.
- March 25 – Chinese customs authorities in Shenzhen destroy 34.78 tons of "substandard bananas" imported from the Philippines due to excessive pesticide use.
- March 26 – A wildfire on the Philippines' highest mountain, Mount Apo, forces hundreds of people to flee from the peak by foot.
- March 27 – Anonymous Philippines hacks the website of the Commission on Elections to force them to place security features on Vote Counting Machine (VCM). Later, the LulzSec Pilipinas leaks sensitive information of voters all over the country from the COMELEC website, with the incident being called the "biggest government data breach in history". On April 21, one of the hackers involved in the recent defacement and supposed leak of data from the Commission on Elections' official website has been arrested in Sampaloc, Manila. On April 29, another hacker allegedly responsible for leaking voter information from the Comelec website is arrested by the National Bureau of Investigation.
- March 28:
  - Laguna Lake Development Authority (LLDA) general manager Neric Acosta is sentenced to a maximum of 10 years of imprisonment after being found guilty of one count of graft by the Sandiganbayan Fourth Division in connection with the misuse of his pork barrel funds as district representative of Bukidnon.
  - None of the three pre-qualified bidders submit offers for the largest Private-Public Partnership (PPP) project to date, the Laguna Lakeshore Expressway estimated to cost around P123 billion.
  - Several piles of license plate sheets are stolen from the Quezon City central office of the Land Transportation Office during the Holy Week break.
- March 29:
  - Ten Indonesian crew members on board a tugboat are kidnapped by Abu Sayyaf militants in Philippine waters. They are released in Jolo on May 1.
  - President Aquino signs Republic Act No. 10754 into law a bill authored by Leyte Rep. Martin Romualdez granting persons with disabilities (PWDs) exemption from the 12-percent value-added tax (VAT) on certain goods and services.
  - The Commission on Elections decides not to stop the broadcast of senatorial candidate Manny Pacquiao's boxing match on April 9.
- March 30 – The Ombudsman files graft and technical malversation cases against Sen. JV Ejercito over the alleged anomalous purchase of high-powered firearms worth P2.1 million during his term as mayor of San Juan City.

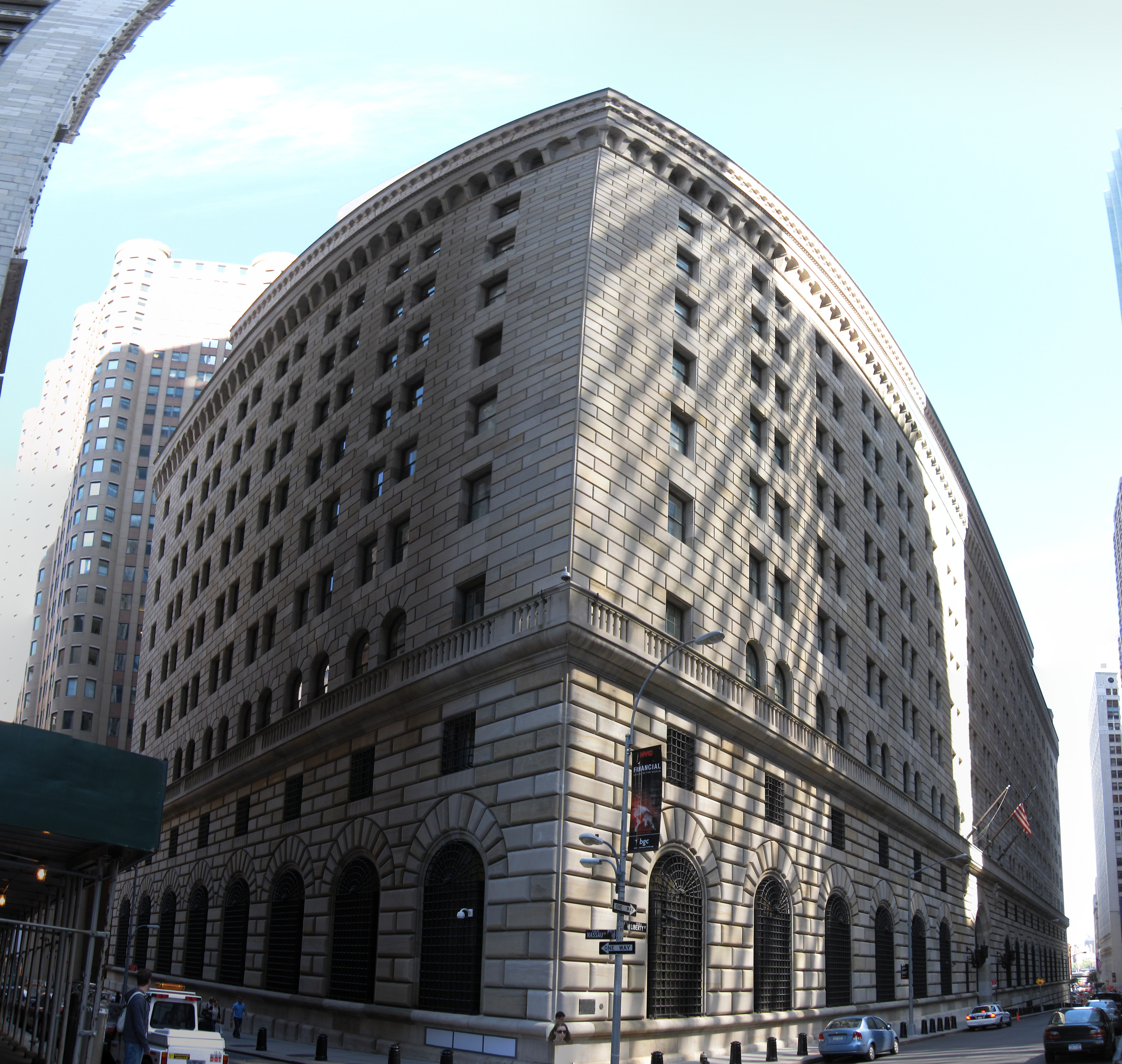
Five transactions issued by hackers, worth $101 million and withdrawn from a Bangladesh Bank account at the Federal Reserve Bank of New York, succeeded, with $20M traced to Sri Lanka (since recovered) and $81M to the Philippines.

- March 31:
  - The camp of businessman Kim Wong hands over to the Bangko Sentral ng Pilipinas, the $4.6 million he volunteered to return to the Bangladesh government, supposedly after learning that the money was part of the $81-million 2016 Bangladesh Bank heist. On April 4, Wong turns over an additional P38.28 million to the Anti-Money Laundering Council (AMLC). On April 19, Eastern Hawaii Leisure Co. Ltd., turns over P200 million to the AMLC.
  - Addong Salahuddin, the suspect in the bombing incident at the Zamboanga City Airport on August 5, 2010, surrenders to the National Bureau of Investigation.

=== April ===
- April 1:
  - At least three are killed and several others were wounded when police disperse a farmers' protest action in Kidapawan demanding relief from the provincial government due to a drought caused by El Niño.
  - The Department of Education, in partnership with Stairway Foundation, launches CyberSafe Project Manuals, which contain individual lesson plans targeting Grades 5 to 6 and junior high students to prevent internet-related child abuse.
- April 2 – A power outage hits Ninoy Aquino International Airport (NAIA) Terminal 3 in Pasay, causing a disruption in the processing of passengers.
- April 4 – The Olongapo Regional Trial Court Branch 74 denies the petition of US Marine Joseph Scott Pemberton to reverse his conviction for his homicide case of Filipino transgender Jennifer Laude.

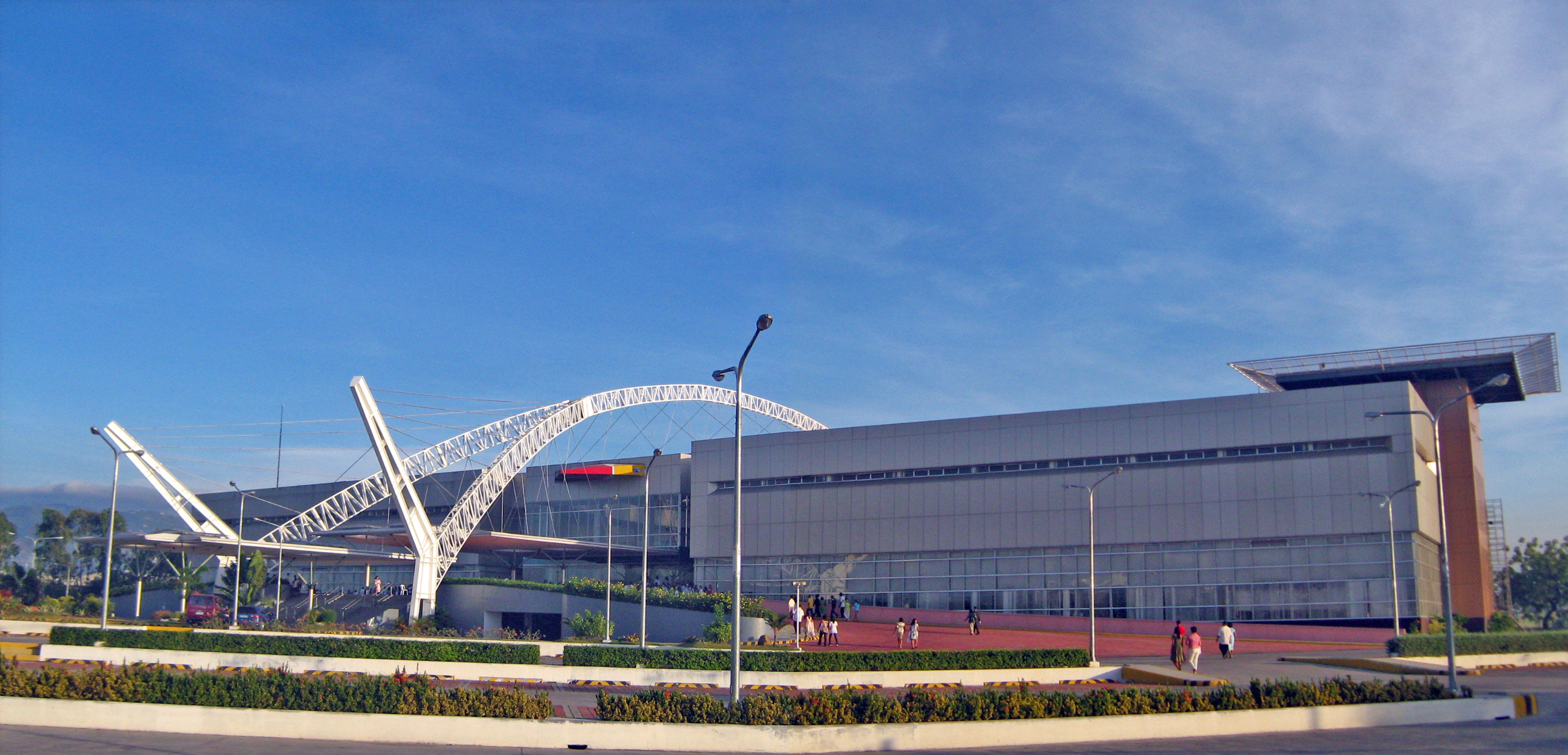
The Cebu International Convention Center was the subject of the graft charges filed by Third District of Cebu Representative Gwendolyn Garcia.

- April 5:
  - The Ombudsman finds probable cause to file charges against former PNP chief Alan Purisima and former SAF director Getulio Napeñas for the Mamasapano clash.
  - The Ombudsman orders the filing of graft charges against re-electionist Cebu 3rd District Rep. Gwendolyn Garcia and 11 other former officials over the alleged anomalous construction of the P833-million Cebu International Convention Center (CICC) in 2006.
- April 6 – A group calling itself iBalik ang Bilyones ng Mamamayan (iBBM) files a complaint for plunder against Senator Bongbong Marcos for his alleged involvement in the PDAF scam.
- April 8:
  - Italian national Rolando Del Torchio is released after being kidnapped at his pizza parlor in Dipolog on October 7, 2015.
  - Memorandum Order No. 90 is signed by Executive Secretary Paquito Ochoa Jr., abolishing the 42-year-old Armed Forces of the Philippines–Retirement and Separation Benefits System (AFP–RSBS).
  - Bohol declares a state of calamity due to El Niño.
- April 9:
  - The Supreme Court declares that their vote on Grace Poe's natural-born status and 10-year residency is final and executory and she is eligible to become president.
  - 18 soldiers and five Abu Sayyaf bandits including a suspected foreign terrorist, Moroccan national Mohammad Khattab, and Ubaida Hapilon, the son of senior leader Isnilon Hapilon are killed during a clash in Tipo-Tipo, Basilan.

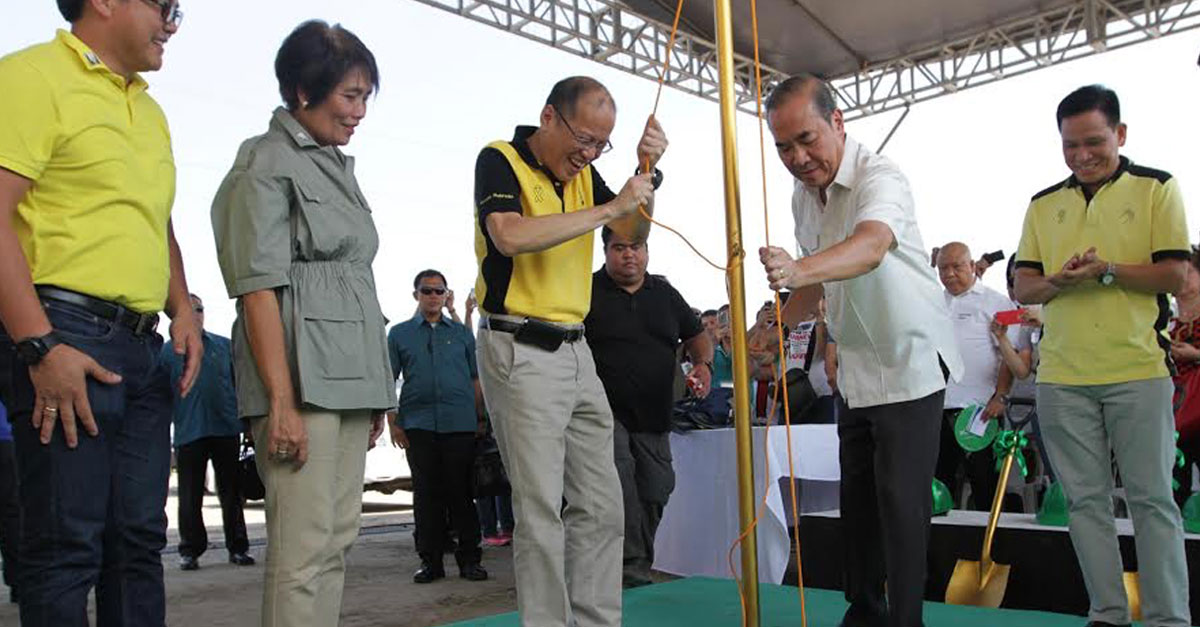
President Aquino in the groundbreaking ceremony of Clark Green City.

- April 11:
  - The groundbreaking rites for the Clark Green City, a sustainable city located in the Clark Freeport Zone in Angeles, Pampanga, is conducted and led by President Aquino.
  - Cebu province is placed under state of calamity due to El Niño.
- April 13 – The Sandidganbayan Fifth Division grants the petitions for bail of former APEC Partylist Representative Edgar Valdez, former Masbate Representative Rizalina Lanete, and Janet Lim-Napoles who are facing plunder charges in connection with the PDAF scam.
- April 17 – Presidential frontrunner Rodrigo Duterte causes controversy when a video of him making a joke about the rape of a murdered Australian missionary goes viral.
- April 20:
  - The Sandiganbayan Special Fourth Division acquits former Presidential Commission on Good Government (PCGG) chairman Camilo Sabio from graft and malversation of public funds cases, which stemmed from his alleged misuse of almost P12 million worth of recovered ill-gotten wealth of the Marcoses.
  - The groundbreaking rites for the ₱69.3-billion Metro Rail Transit Line 7 (MRT-7) project, marking the start of the construction of the 23-kilo-meter elevated railway from North Avenue, Quezon City to San Jose del Monte in Bulacan, is conducted and led by President Aquino.
- April 25 – John Ridsdel, a Canadian taken hostage by the Abu Sayyaf in Samal Island, is beheaded in Jolo, Sulu.
- April 27 – Voted 4–3, the COMELEC en banc officially cancels voting on selected malls scheduled on May 9.

=== May ===
- May 2 – Vice presidential candidate and senator Antonio Trillanes IV and attorney Sal Panelo, lawyer of presidential frontrunner Rodrigo Duterte, visit the Bank of the Philippine Islands branch along Julia Vargas Avenue in Pasig, in a bid to settle the Trillanes' allegations of hidden wealth against Duterte.
- May 5 –Negative advertisements paid by Trillanes targeting Rodrigo Duterte using unidentified children and another one about Duterte's alleged hidden wealth are aired on media outlets, causing uproar. A 72-hour TRO is issued by a court in Taguig to stop any TV stations from airing the advertisements.
- May 6 – Mario Reyes, former mayor of Coron, Palawan and one of two brothers are accused of masterminding the 2011 murder of journalist and good governance advocate Gerry Ortega is granted bail by the court trying the case.

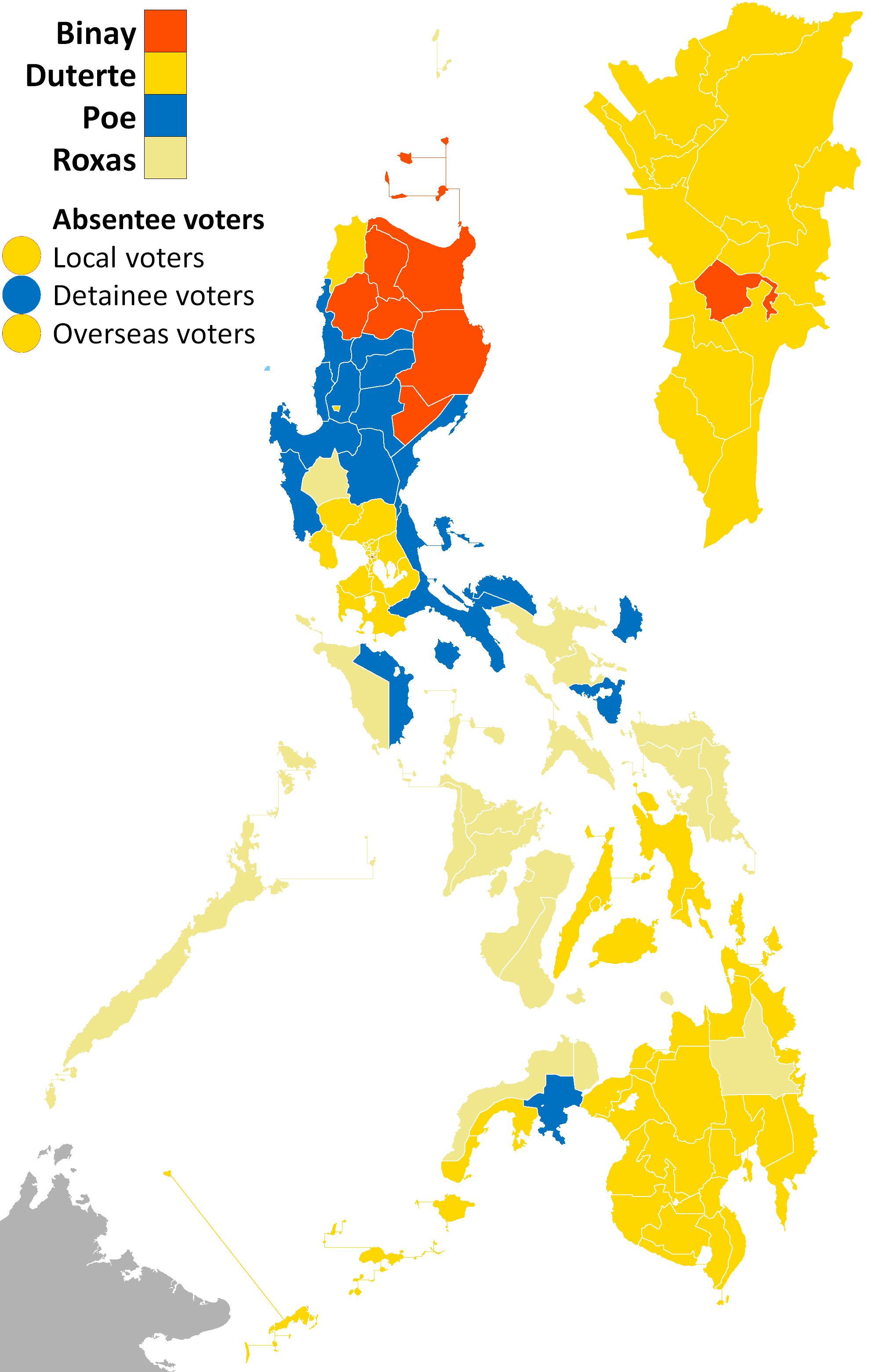
Provincial and city breakdown of presidential race 2016.

- May 9 – The 2016 National and Local elections are held.
- May 11 – The Sandiganbayan dismisses former Commission on Elections chairman Benjamin Abalos' graft charges over the botched $329-million ZTE-National Broadband Network (NBN) deal in 2007.
- May 14 – Special elections are held in select villages in Visayas and Mindanao, where the Commission on Elections declare a failure of elections.
- May 16 – Crime journalist Alex Balcoba is murdered outside his family's watch repair shop in Quiapo, Manila.
- May 18 – President Aquino signs Republic Act No. 10821 or the Children's Emergency Relief and Protection Act which seeks to provide children with comprehensive relief and protection in the aftermath of disasters.
- May 23:
  - The historic San Pedro bell is finally returned and displayed at the Bauang Church in La Union, more than a hundred years after it was taken by American soldiers as a war booty during the Philippine–American War.
  - President Aquino signs Republic Act No. 10844 into law, which creates the Department of Information and Communications Technology (DICT).
- May 30 – Congress proclaims Rodrigo Duterte and Leni Robredo as President-elect and Vice President-elect of the Philippines, respectively, based on the canvassing of votes by the National Board of Canvassers for President and Vice President from May 25 to 27.
- May 31:
  - The Supreme Court dismisses the appeal of former MMDA chairman and senatorial candidate Francis Tolentino to stop the proclamation of Sherwin Gatchalian, Ralph Recto, and Leila de Lima, the top 10, 11 and 12 senators in the 2016 Philippine Senate election respectively.
  - President Aquino signs Republic Act No. 10863 or the Customs Modernization and Tariff Act (CMTA), which amends some previsions of the Tariff and Customs Code of 1978 and to modernize the operations of the Bureau of Customs.

=== June ===
- June 1:
  - The Ombudsman orders the filing of criminal charges against former Valenzuela representative and senator-elect Sherwin Gatchalian, former Local Water Utilities Administration (LWUA) chairman of the board Prospero Pichay Jr. and 24 other former government officials and private individuals for alleged anomalous acquisition of a thrift bank in 2009.
  - The Philippine Navy commissions its brand new and largest ship, the BRP Tarlac together with three newly acquired landing craft heavy vessels, BRP Waray, BRP Iwak, and BRP Agta.
  - The Sandiganbayan Third Division dismisses the perjury and violation of the code of conduct cases against the late Supreme Court Chief Justice Renato Corona.
  - The Antipolo Regional Trial Court dismisses the double-murder case against ex-Colonel Red Kapunan, in connection with the killing of former Kilusang Mayo Uno (KMU) leader Rolando Olalia and his driver Leonor Alay-ay in 1986.
  - The Vatican’s doctrinal watchdog overrules Lipa Archbishop Ramon Arguelles and rejects his 2012 decree declaring that the alleged Marian apparitions in Batangas in 1948 were authentic.
- June 2 – The Land Transportation Franchising and Regulatory Board (LTFRB) officially starts phasing out school service vehicles 15 years old and up.
- June 7 – The Supreme Court dismisses a petition filed by attorney Elly Pamatong, a presidential candidate classified as a nuisance seeking to annul the votes of President-elect Rodrigo Duterte and stop his proclamation by the National Board of Canvassers.
- June 8 – The Ombudsman upholds the decision of the Manila Prosecutor's Office dismissing a treason and inciting to sedition complaint filed last year against outgoing Presidential Peace Adviser Teresita Deles, peace negotiators Miriam Coronel-Ferrer and Mohagher Iqbal and members of the Bangsamoro Transition Commission (BTC).
- June 12 – The Chinese Coast Guard bars Kalayaan Atin Ito Movement, a Filipino youth group, from sailing to the disputed Scarborough Shoal to plant a Philippine flag there to celebrate the country's Independence Day.
- June 14:
  - Robert Hall, the second Canadian taken hostage by Abu Sayyaf in Samal Island, is beheaded in Jolo .
  - The Supreme Court dismisses a petition that sought to stop the lease of 70,977 optical mark reader (OMR) machines for P6.286 billion that were used in the May 2016 elections.
  - The two Cessna aircraft sequestered from the late Alfonso Lim, an alleged crony of the Marcos family, are sold by the Sandiganbayan for a significantly low amount of P140,000.
  - The Supreme Court temporarily stops the Land Transportation Office (LTO) from issuing 700,000 license plates to motorists and from accepting more license plates from the Bureau of Customs.
  - Eight Philippine universities led by the University of the Philippines (UP) are included in the latest Quacquarelli Symonds (QS) University Rankings on the top 350 universities in Asia.
- June 15 – Informal talks between the incoming Duterte administration and representatives of the Communist Party of the Philippines-National Democratic Front (CPP-NDF) commence in Oslo, Norway.
- June 16:
  - President Aquino vetoes House Bill No. 6411 and Senate Bill No. 2720 that seeks to improve the nursing profession, including raising the minimum monthly salary of nurses to almost P25,000.
  - The Sandiganbayan First Division acquits former Philippine Sports Commission (PSC) chairman William Ramirez of graft in connection with the alleged anomalous procurement of cycling equipment in 2007.
  - The COMELEC en banc grants the Liberal Party's request and several similar petitions that they be allowed to file their statement of contributions and expenses (SOCE) beyond the June 8 deadline long before the May 9 elections.
  - Malacañang temporarily stops the Department of Justice (DOJ) from filing criminal charges against newly elected 1-Pacman party-list Representative Mikee Romero, who was alleged to have committed qualified theft against Harbour Centre Port Terminal Inc. (HCPTI).
- June 17 – The Manila Metropolitan Trial Court (MTC) Branch 12, orders the two siblings of Iglesia ni Cristo executive minister Eduardo V. Manalo, expelled members Angel and Lottie, to vacant from a property of the religious sect in No. 36 Tandang Sora Street, Quezon City.
- June 21 – The Commission on Elections en banc accepts the resignation of senior Commissioner Christian Robert Lim as head of the Campaign Finance Office (CFO), following the extension of the filing of their statements of contributions and expenditures.
- June 23 – The DOJ dismisses criminal complaints filed by American missionary Lane Michael White, against airport employees, including four aviation police officers, in connection with the alleged bullet planting scheme at Ninoy Aquino International Airport.
- June 24 – Marites Flor, a Filipina taken hostage by Abu Sayyaf in Samal Island, is released in Jolo.
- June 25 – The Department of Science and Technology launches the very first Filipino-made hybrid electric train.
- June 27: President Aquino signs Republic Act No. 10868 into law a measure that will grant a P100,000 cash incentive and additional benefits and privileges to Filipino centenarians.
- June 28:
  - President Aquino signs Republic Act No. 10867 into law, that mandating the National Bureau of Investigation (NBI)’s reorganization and modernization, 69 years after the creation of its first charter.
  - The Supreme Court dismisses a petition filed by retired Army Col. Justino Padiernos and attorney Manuelito Luna, questioning the Commission on Elections' decision to extend the filing of the statements of contributions and expenditures of candidates and political parties in the 2016 election.
  - The Supreme Court dismisses a petition filed by Greco Belgica and former Tarlac Governor Tingting Cojuangco seeking the prosecution of all the authors, proponents, and implementors of both the pork barrel system and the Disbursement Acceleration Program (DAP).

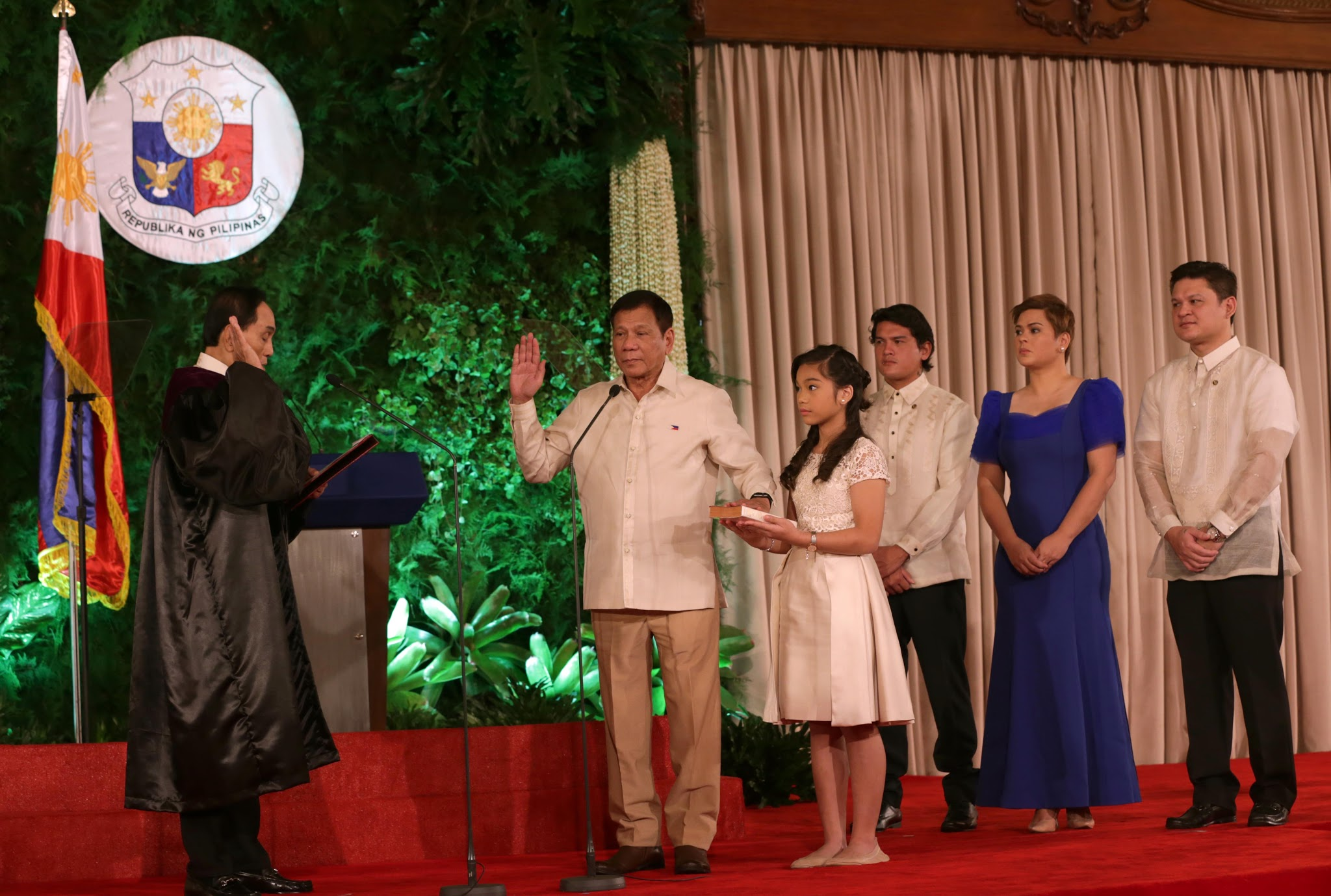
Rodrigo Duterte takes his oath of office as the 16th President of the Philippines.

- June 30 – Rodrigo Duterte is inaugurated as the 16th President of the Philippines with Leni Robredo being inaugurated as the 14th Vice President of the Philippines, marking the beginning of the Duterte administration.

=== July ===
- July 2 – Grade 6 student Nasif Cali from Denaig Elementary School in Poona Piagapo, Lanao del Norte wins the World Food Programme's (WFP) Children's Design Competition 2016 in Rome, besting 69 other submissions. The WFP awards him personally with $100 and awards his school $2,000 for school supplies.
- July 4:
  - President Duterte signs his first executive order, entitled Reengineering the Office of the President Towards Greater Responsiveness to the Attainment of Development Goals, allowing his Cabinet Secretary Leoncio Evasco, Jr. to oversee 12 national government agencies in coming up with a set of programs to reduce both the incidence and magnitude of poverty.
- July 5 – President Duterte, in his speech during the 69th anniversary of the Philippine Air Force names five top police generals who were allegedly involved in illegal drug trade.
- July 6 – PAGASA announces the end of the El Niño phenomenon.
- July 10 – Three Philippine islands, Palawan, Boracay and Cebu, are featured on the "World's Best Islands" list for 2016 of the New York-based magazine Travel + Leisure.
- July 11 – The Ombudsman finds probable cause to file graft charges against former Health Secretary Enrique Ona and two other officials of the Department of Health (DOH) for an alleged anomalous ₱392.2-million hospital modernization project in 2012.

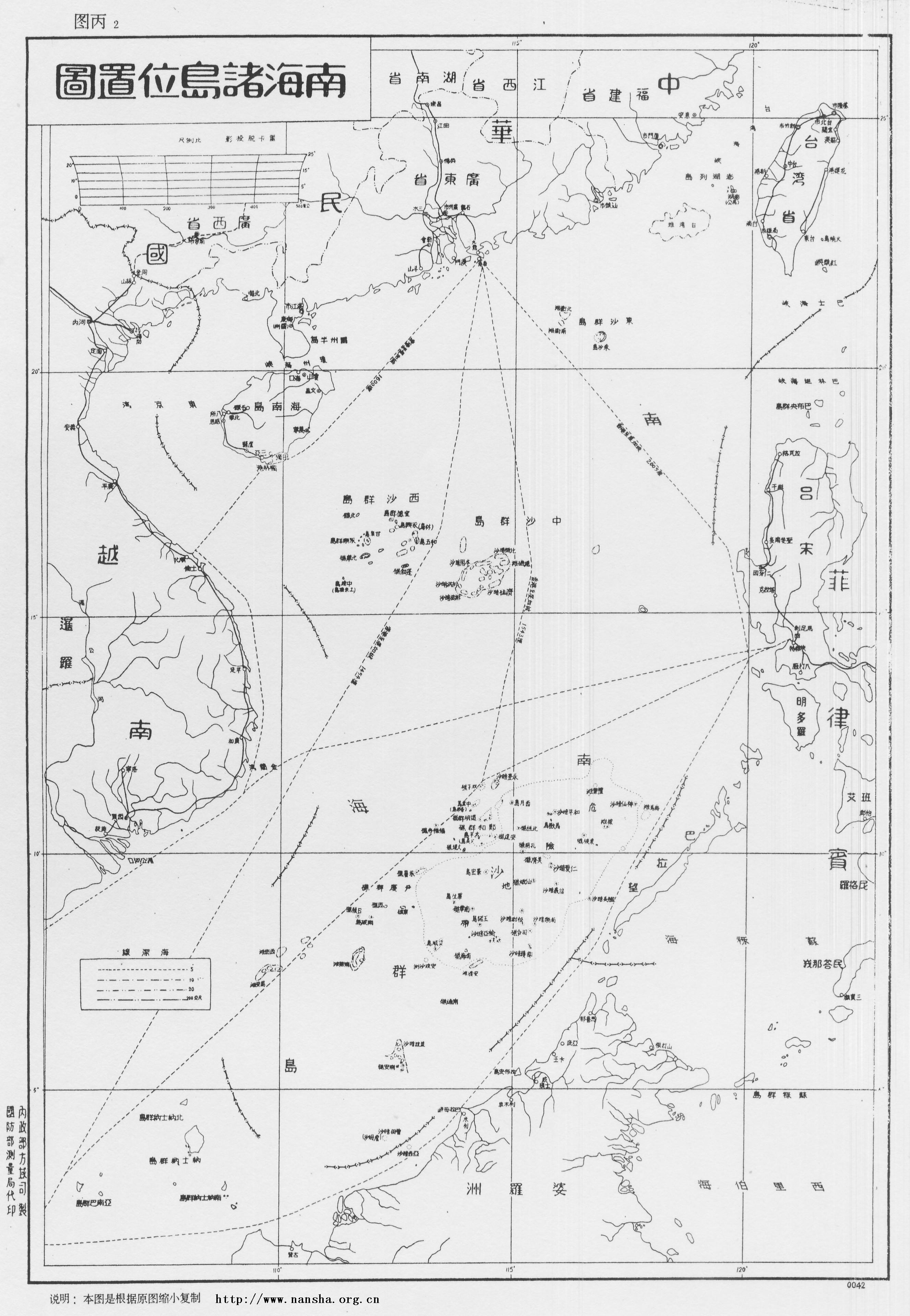
China's nine-dotted line claim over the South China Sea, 1947

- July 12:
  - The Philippines wins the arbitration case it filed at the Permanent Court of Arbitration regarding the legality of China's Nine dash line claims over the South China Sea under the United Nations Convention on the Law of the Sea.
  - Philippine delegates Debby Sy, Hannah Joy Alcomendas and Camille Joy Buron are recognized for their contributions to the four-day Asia Pacific Youth Parliament for Water (APYPW) event by the Korea Water Forum at the Daegu Gyeongbuk Institute of Science and Technology in South Korea.
  - The provincial government of Basilan declares a state of emergency in the municipalities of Tipo-Tipo, Ungkaya Pukan and Al-Barka as the AFP continues its intensified offensive against Abu Sayyaf.
- July 13 – A 12-year-old girl is killed while two soldiers are wounded in a firefight between government troops and members of the Bangsamoro Islamic Freedom Fighters in Maguindanao.
- July 14 – The Ombudsman files graft, falsification and violation of the government procurement law charges against former Vice President Jejomar Binay in connection with the overpricing of the Makati City Hall Building II project.
- July 15 – President Duterte meets with Cebuano-Chinese entrepreneur Peter Lim, one of the three alleged leaders of illegal drug trade in the Philippines.
- July 18 – The main runway of Ninoy Aquino International Airport is closed due to emergency pavement repairs that force 10 international and domestic flights to be diverted to Clark International Airport in Pampanga, resulting in delayed and cancelled flights all over the country.
- July 19 – The Supreme Court acquits former President Gloria Macapagal Arroyo of her plunder case regarding the alleged misuse of funds for the Philippine Charity Sweepstakes Office (PSCO) in an 11–4 ruling.
- July 20 – Around 320 Philippine National Police-Special Action Force's (PNP-SAF) elite personnel troopers are deployed to replace jail guards of the New Bilibid Prison (NBP), where irregularities like gun running and the illegal drug trade allegedly remain rampant.
- July 23 – President Duterte signs an executive order for the implementation of the Freedom of Information (FOI).

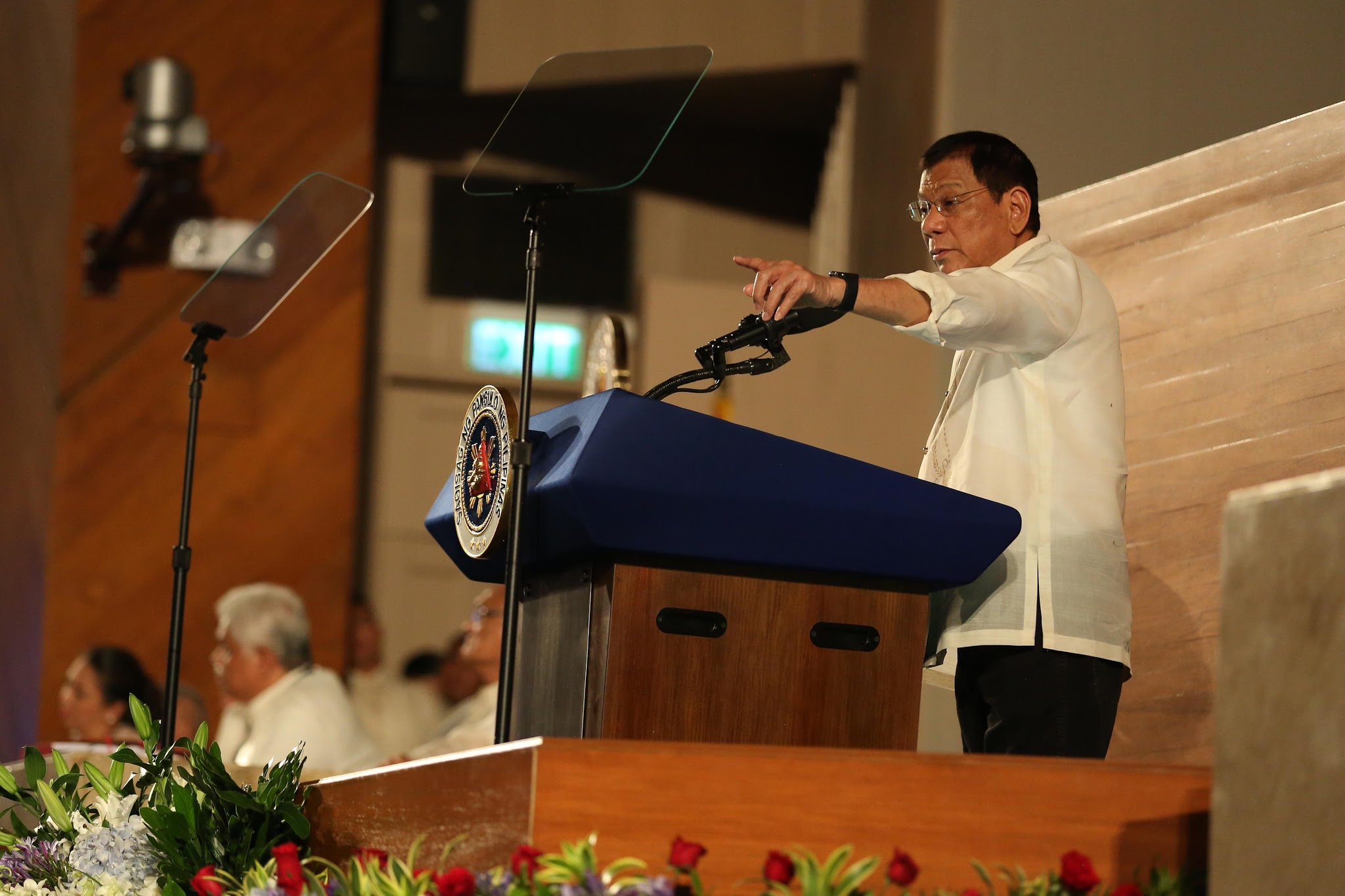
Duterte delivers his first State of the Nation Address, July 25, 2016

- July 25 – President Duterte delivers his first State of the Nation Address (SONA).
- July 26 – The Supreme Court issues a temporary restraining order that halts the implementation of the curfew ordinances for minors in Manila, Quezon City, and Navotas.
- July 30:
  - The National Grid Corporation of the Philippines (NGCP) places the Luzon power grid under a red alert status due to low level operating reserves, as seven power plants are encountering problems.
  - President Duterte lifts the unilateral ceasefire and placed troops on high alert after the Communist Party of the Philippines-New People's Army (CPP-NPA) failed his deadline to make their own declaration.

=== August ===
- August 1 – The Duterte administration launches a 24-hour complaint office accessible to the public through a nationwide hotline, 8888, and changes the nationwide emergency telephone number from 117 to 911.
- August 2 – Mayor Rolando Espinosa of Albuera, Leyte, who is linked to drug trafficking, surrenders to PNP chief Ronald dela Rosa, after he and his son Kerwin are asked by President Duterte to voluntarily surrender within 24 hours or face a shoot-on-sight order by police.
- August 3 – Six aides of Ronaldo and Kerwin Espinosa are killed in a shootout with police in Albuera.
- August 4 – The Sandiganbayan grants the motion of theOmbudsman to amend the plunder case against former Agriculture Undersecretary Jocelyn Bolante in connection with the ₱723-million fertilizer fund scam.
- August 5 – The Supreme Court grants the provisional liberty to Satur Ocampo and two others who were allied with the Communist Party of the Philippines to allow them to attend the peace talks with the government in Oslo.
- August 7 – President Duterte publicly names more than 150 government officials including mayors, judges, police and lawmakers who are allegedly involved in the illegal drug trade.
- August 8– Fourteen are killed, eight are injured and 262,271 families are affected after heavy rains and floods due to southwest monsoon shuts down Metro Manila and nearby provinces.
- August 11 – Ten high-profile inmates are killed in an explosion inside the Parañaque City Jail.
- August 12 – The Manila Regional Trial Court Branch 32 grants the bail petition to communist leaders Benito and Wilma Tiamzon ahead of the scheduled peace talks with the Communist Party of the Philippines in Oslo.
- August 13 – Peace talks between the government and the Moro Islamic Liberation Front reopen in Kuala Lumpur, Malaysia.
- August 14:
  - Thousands gather at Rizal Park protesting the burial of former President Ferdinand Marcos scheduled for September 18.
  - A rare tornado hits Manila and nearby areas at around 4:30 pm PHT, which, according to a report by PAGASA, originated from land.
- August 15 – The DOJ orders the filing of direct assault with murder charges in court against 88 people over the Mamasapano clash.
- August 16 – The Supreme Court, acting as the Presidential Electoral Tribunal, dismisses the electoral protest filed by 2010 vice presidential candidate Mar Roxas against former Vice President Jejomar Binay in the May 10, 2010, elections.
- August 17:
  - Mohammad Safyan, an Indonesian crew member of the tugboat Charles, who was abducted by Abu Sayyaf off the high seas near the Philippine border on June 23, along with six other crew members, escapes from his captors in Luuk, Sulu.
  - Maia Deguito, the former branch manager of the Rizal Commercial Banking Corporation tagged in the $81-million money laundering scandal, is in Makati for perjury.
- August 20–27 – Peace talks between the government and the Communist Party of the Philippines, New People's Army, National Democratic Front (CPP–NPA–NDF) take place in Oslo.
- August 22 – The Senate Committee on Justice and Human Rights begins its hearing on the spate of summary executions in the Philippines.
- August 23:
  - The Sandiganbayan founds NBN-ZTE deal whistleblower Jun Lozada, guilty of graft for granting separate leasehold rights over public lands to his brother and to a private company with ties to him under the Lupang Hinirang program of the Philippine Forest Corporation.
  - Rogelio Bato Jr., the lawyer of Albuera Mayor Rolando Espinosa, and his 15-year-old companion, Angelica Bonita are killed in a shooting in Tacloban.
  - The Supreme Court issues a 20-day status quo ante order on the issue of the planned burial of former president Ferdinand Marcos at the Libingan ng Mga Bayani.
- August 25 – President Duterte releases a matrix showing the supposed links of Senator Leila de Lima and other former and current government officials to the alleged illegal drug operations inside the New Bilibid Prison.
- August 26 – The Philippine government and the NDF sign an indefinite ceasefire agreement as part of efforts to end the five-decade old communist rebellion.
- August 27–20 inmates escape after the Maute Group, armed with assault rifles and rocket propelled grenades, attack the Lanao del Sur provincial jail.
- August 29–15 soldiers and 30 Abu Sayyaf members are killed in a clash in Patikul, Sulu.
- August 31 – Ombudsman Conchita Carpio-Morales is among the year's recipients of the Ramon Magsaysay Awards.

=== September ===
- September 2 – An explosion rocks a night market in Davao City, killing 15 people and injuring 70. Abu Sayyaf claims responsibility for the attack.
- September 4 – President Duterte issues Proclamation No. 55 declaring a state of emergency in the Philippines on account of lawless violence following the Davao City bombing.
- September 5 – The Philippine National Police launches the Text Bato hotline 2286 and Itaga Mo sa Bato mobile app as the newest tools in its campaign against narcotics.
- September 8 – Joel Reyes, former governor of Palawan and one of two brothers accused of masterminding the 2011 murder of journalist and good governance advocate Gerry Ortega is denied bail by the court trying the case.
- September 9 – The fact-finding team of the Commission on Elections clears Smartmatic of liability in the controversial alteration of the script of the transparency server used for the quick counts in the May 9 polls.
- September 11 – The Official Gazette of the Philippines receives criticism after posting a graphic commemorating the dictator Ferdinand Marcos' 99th birth anniversary, with some social media users accusing the government outfit of historical revisionism.
- September 13 – The Supreme Court dismisses the bid of the Office of the Solicitor General (OSG) seeking to lift the temporary restraining order (TRO) issued in June 2015 enjoining the procurement, selling, distributing, dispensing and administering and promoting contraceptive implants.
- September 14 – The Sandiganbayan dismisses the graft case against former National Economic and Development Authority (NEDA) chief Romulo Neri over the alleged overpriced national broadband network project with China's ZTE Corp. in 2007.
- September 15 – Edgar Matobato, a former member of the Davao Death Squad, testifies at a Senate hearing on alleged extrajudicial killings during the Duterte administration.
- September 16 – The Sandiganbayan dismisses the graft cases against former President Gloria Macapagal-Arroyo over the allegedly anomalous NBN-ZTE deal.
- September 17:
  - Kjartan Sekkingstad, a Norwegian taken hostage by the Abu Sayyaf in Samal Island, is released in Jolo.
  - The Provincial Government of Batanes declares a state of calamity due to damage brought by Typhoon Ferdie.
- September 19 – Voting 16–4–2, the Senate removes Leila de Lima as chairperson of the Committee on Justice and Human Rights after granting Senator Manny Pacquiao's motion to declare the chairmanship and membership of the committee vacant.
- September 20:
  - The House Committee on Justice begins its hearing on the New Bilibid Prison drug trafficking scandal.
  - The Supreme Court upholds the decision of the Senate Electoral Tribunal on Senator Grace Poe's eligibility to run in the 2013 election and ruled that she is qualified to sit as a senator of the republic.
- September 28 – A riot occurs in New Bilibid Prison, killing high-profile inmate Tony Co, and injuring three others including convicted drug lord Jaybee Sebastian.

=== October ===
- October 13 – President Duterte signs Administrative Order No. 1 which forms the Presidential Task Force against violence and killing of journalists.
- October 19:
  - Super Typhoon Haima (Lawin) hits northern Luzon, killing at least four people. Typhoon signal number 5 is raised for the first time before and after its landfall.
  - A violent protest occurs at Roxas Boulevard in the front of the US embassy in Manila. Three protesters are injured after being rammed by a police van during the dispersal. The Philippine National Police and Congress call an investigation to the dispersal.

=== November ===
- November 8 – The Supreme Court votes 9–5–1 in favor of former President Ferdinand Marcos' remains to be buried at the Libingan ng mga Bayani in Taguig.
- November 18 – Ferdinand Marcos is buried at the Libingan ng mga Bayani in a private ceremony.
- November 26–30 – The AFP and Maute Group clash after the latter seize the town of Butig, Lanao del Sur.

=== December ===
- December 7 – President Duterte signs Executive Order No. 10 creating a consultative committee to review the 1987 Philippine Constitution.
- December 25 – Typhoon Nina (Nock-ten) makes landfall in Catanduanes.
- December 28–27 people are injured after an improvised explosive device (IED) explodes during a boxing match at a festival in Hilongos, Leyte.

== Holidays ==
On August 26, 2015, the government announced at least 19 Philippine holidays for 2016 as declared by virtue of Proclamation No. 1105, series of 2015. Note that in the list, holidays in italics are "special non-working holidays," those in bold are "regular holidays," and those in non-italics and non-bold are "special holidays for schools."

In addition, several other places observe local holidays, such as the foundation of their town. These are also "special days."

- January 1 – **New Year's Day**
- January 2 – Special non-working holiday
- February 8 – Chinese New Year
- February 25 – 1986 EDSA Revolution
- March 24 – **Maundy Thursday**
- March 25 – **Good Friday**
- March 26 – Black Saturday
- April 9 – **Araw ng Kagitingan** (Day of Valor)
- May 1 – **Labor Day**
- May 9 – Election Day
- June 12 – **Independence Day**
- July 6 – **Eid'l Fitr** (Feast of Ramadan)
- August 21 – Ninoy Aquino Day
- August 29 – **National Heroes Day**
- September 12 – **Eid'l Adha** (Feast of Sacrifice)
- November 1 – All Saints Day
- November 30 – **Bonifacio Day**
- December 24 – Special non-working holiday (in observance of the Christmas season)
- December 25 – **Christmas Day**
- December 26 – Special non-working holiday (in observance of the Christmas season)
- December 30 – **Rizal Day**
- December 31 – Last day of the year (in observance of New Year's celebrations)

== Business and economy ==
- January 4 – The Philippine Stock Exchange is named the Best Stock Exchange in Southeast Asia by the Marquee Awards of the Alpha Southeast Asia magazine.
- February 1 – Following complaints that the ₱100 and ₱1,000 bills seem to look alike, the Bangko Sentral ng Pilipinas (BSP) has released new 100-peso bank notes with a stronger mauve or violet color.
- February 4:
  - President Aquino III signs Executive Order 198 on the merger between two government-owned banks, The Development Bank of the Philippines (DBP) and The Land Bank of the Philippines (LBP).
  - Hackers transferred funds from the Bangladesh Bank's account with the Federal Reserve Bank of New York to Rizal Commercial Banking Corporation which was later transferred to Philippine-based casinos. The money laundering case may potentially be the biggest documented case of money laundering the country if proven.
- February 18 – Pepsi-Cola Products Philippines Inc. inaugurates its manufacturing plant for its snacks line including Cheetos, located in Cabuyao, Laguna.
- May 25 – President Aquino III signed Republic Act No. 10846 amending the charter of the Philippine Deposit Insurance Corp. (PDIC) or the deposit insurance law.
- May 30 – PLDT, Inc. and Globe Telecom announces the acquisition of telecommunications business and assets of San Miguel Corporation, following the SMC's failed partnership attempt with Australia-based telecom company Telstra.
- June 16 – President Aquino vetoes House Bill 3675 and Senate Bill 2518 that seeks removing conditions for the condonation of all unpaid income taxes of local water districts (LWDs).
- July 7 – Geronimo De Los Reyes Jr., the chairman emeritus of Gateway Property Holdings, and acclaimed veterinarian Anton Mari Lim were among on the list of Heroes of Philanthropy by Forbes Asia.
- July 19 – The Court of Appeals voided an order issued by the National Telecommunications Commission (NTC) in November 2012, requiring telecommunications companies to cut their Short Message Service (SMS) rates and return the excess amount paid by subscribers.
- July 22:
  - The Securities and Exchange Commission (SEC) disqualifies businessman Roberto Ongpin from serving as an officer or board member in any public company or publicly listed company after he allegedly engaged in insider trading in the sale of Philex mining shares in 2009.
  - The DOTr and LTFRB stops accepting applications for new drivers for Uber and Grab due to a backlog as the government reviews its policies on fare spikes.
- July 23 – The Court of Appeals denies Globe Telecom's petition to prevent the Philippine Competition Commission (PCC) from reviewing its joint ₱69.1-billion acquisition with PLDT of San Miguel Corp's telecom business.
- August 8 – The Philippine Deposit Insurance Corporation files a criminal complaint for syndicated fraud against the former directors, officers, employees and consultants of the closed Banco Filipino Savings and Mortgage Bank, estimating losses to the bank at P669.6 million.
- August 29 – Three Philippine-listed companies, Jollibee Foods Corp., Puregold Price Club and Robinsons Retail Holdings were made to list of this year's Forbes Asia Fabulous 50 List.

== Health ==
- March 3 – President Aquino signs the Rare Disease Act, that aims for the persons who have rare diseases to have access to better and comprehensive healthcare.
- March 6 – The Department of Health confirms that an American tourist was tested positive with Zika virus after staying for four weeks in the Philippines. A widespread Zika virus outbreak in the Americas was ongoing at the time.
- April 4 – The Department of Health has launched its school-based dengue immunization program. On April 25, over 200,000 students have been already received by the DOH, the first ever vaccine against dengue since the vaccination program started on April 4.
- April 21 – A norovirus outbreak strikes Zamboanga City killing 4 people and 700 others, including children, were hospitalized.

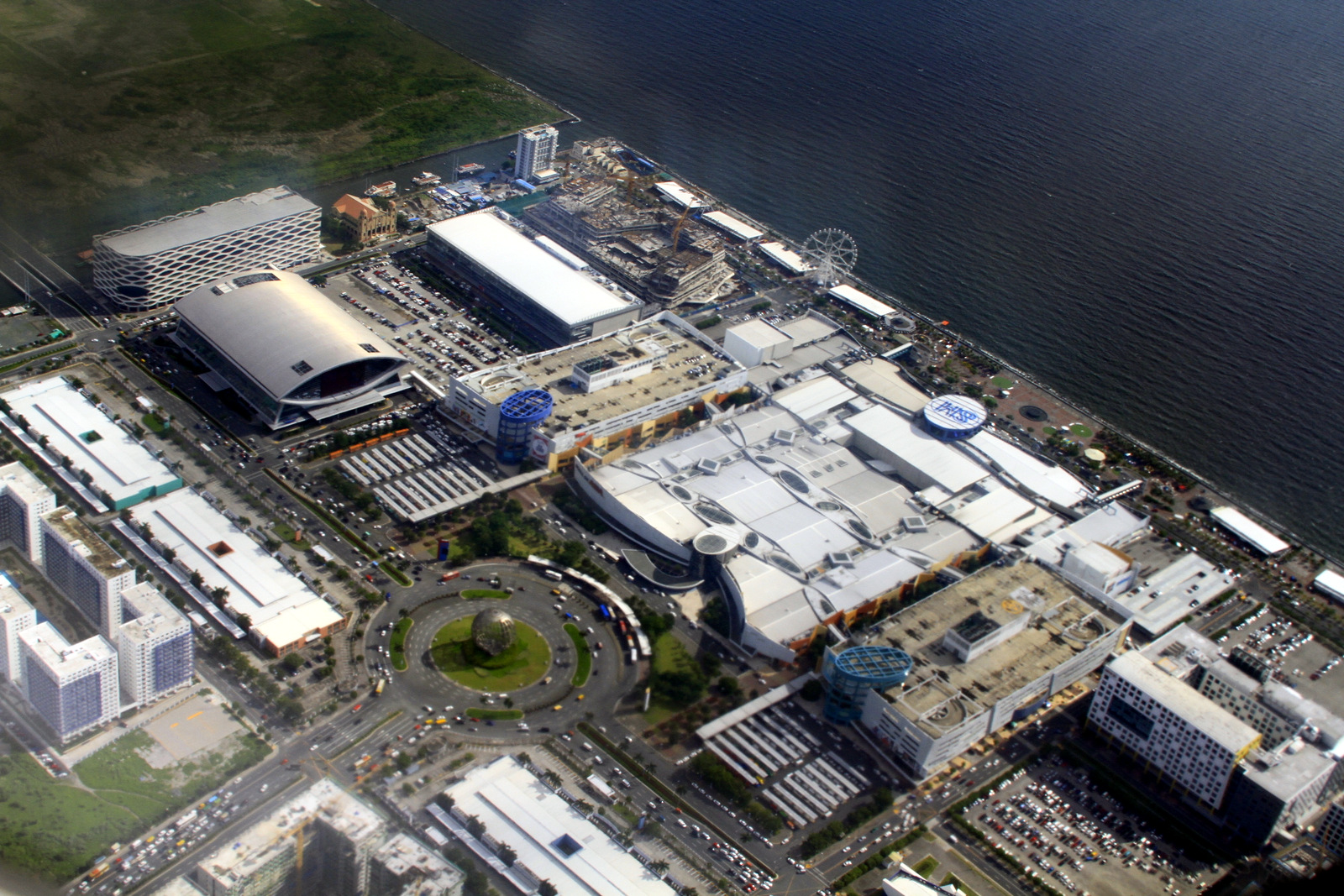
The event at which five concertgoers collapsed and subsequently died took place at the SM Mall of Asia parking area.

- May 21 – Five concertgoers are found dead on the Close-Up Forever Summer concert at the SM Mall of Asia in Pasay. Authorities suspect that the deaths are due to use of ecstasy. Then Presumptive president-elect Rodrigo Duterte blamed the concert deaths on lack of security to prevent illegal drugs from entering the concert.
- May 25 – Arianwen Rollan's research on Malunggay seed extract that may help hamper the growth of tumors, bagged the Qatar Foundation's First Award for Research and Development in Medical Science at year's Intel International Science and Engineering Fair.
- June 2 – A diarrhea outbreak strikes Eastern Visayas, killing 13 people and hospitalizing 1,370 others on Samar and Leyte, as of June 3, 2016. The Department of Health (DOH) stated that lack of potable water in the region resulted to the outbreak.
- July 21 – A state of calamity has been declared in the municipality of Tupi in South Cotabato due to a sudden increase in dengue cases.
- October 1 – An outbreak of Chikungunya disease has been declared in Indang, Cavite.

== Sports ==
The San Miguel Beermen huddle after Game 6 of the 2015–16 PBA Philippine Cup Finals.

- February 3, Basketball – The San Miguel Beermen claim the 2015–16 PBA Philippine Cup title after beating the Alaska Aces in the finals. The Beermen is the first PBA team to come back from a 0–3 deficit.
- February 13 – Filipino boxing champions Nonito Donaire and Donnie Nietes and golfer Miguel Tabuena receive the Athlete of the Year award in the 2015 PSA Annual Awards held in One Espanade, Pasay.
- March 7–11, Multisport – The Philippine National Games are held in Pangasinan.
- March 17–20, Cycling – Tagaytay hosts the World University Cycling Championship.
- April 9–16, Multisport – The Albay province hosts the 2016 Palarong Pambansa.
- April 10, Boxing – Filipino boxing champion Manny Pacquiao defeats Timothy Bradley for the third time.
- April 16–17, Taekwondo – The Asian Taekwondo Olympic Qualification Tournament is hosted by Manila.
- April 23, Boxing – Nonito Donaire defeats Zsolt Bedak via a technical knockout in Cebu City.
- April 30, Volleyball – The DLSU Lady Spikers claim their ninth championship trophy after winning the UAAP Season 78 women's volleyball tournaments against the Ateneo Lady Eagles, 19–25, 25–21, 25–16, 25–16, at the Smart Araneta Coliseum in Quezon City.
- May 25, Boxing – Johnriel Casimero defeats Thai boxer Amnat Ruenroeng to claim the International Boxing Federation's flyweight title in Beijing, China.
- May 28:
  - Boxing – Donnie Nietes retains his light flyweight title from the World Boxing Organization, after defeating Mexican boxer Raúl García into submission after five rounds at the La Salle Coliseum in Bacolod.
  - Basketball – Philippines men's national basketball team won their second tournament title by defeating the host country Thailand in the championship match of 2016 SEABA Cup.
- July 5–10, Basketball – The Philippines co-hosts the 2016 FIBA World Olympic Qualifying Tournament for Men at the SM Mall of Asia Arena in Pasay.
- July 7, Basketball – The Philippines men's national basketball team end their bid to qualify for the 2016 Summer Olympics after losing 80–89 to the New Zealand men's national basketball team in Group B of the 2016 FIBA World Olympic Qualifying Tournament.
- July 10, Boxing – Jason Pagara defeats Mexican boxer Abraham Alvarez, via knockout in the third round of their welterweight showdown in the co-main event of Pinoy Pride 37: Fists of the Future in San Mateo Events Center in San Mateo, California, but his younger brother Albert Pagara suffered the first defeat of his career after he was knocked out by Cesar Juarez at round 8.
- July 15, Basketball – Janine Nicandro, a PBA Developmental League former referee, is appointed as the first female referee of the PBA.
- July 17, Taekwondo – The Philippine taekwondo team bags five gold medals and five silver medals at the World Taekwondo Culture Exposition in Muju, South Korea.
- July 27, Boxing – Marlon Tapales of Lala, Lanao del Norte defeats Thai boxer Pungluang Sor Singyu via knockout in Thailand to claim the World Boxing Organization's bantamweight title.
- July 31, Basketball – The Philippines' Mighty Sports defeat Chinese Taipei B, 104–80, to win the 2016 William Jones Cup.
- August 6–22 – The Philippine delegation, consisting of 13 athletes in eight different sports, participates at the 2016 Summer Olympics in Rio de Janeiro, Brazil.
- August 7, Weightlifting – At the 2016 Summer Olympics in Rio de Janeiro, Hidilyn Diaz wins a silver medal at the women's 53 kg event for weightlifting. It is the Philippines' tenth Olympic medal overall and the country's first since the 1996 Summer Olympics in Atlanta, 20 years prior.
- September 3–11, Volleyball – The Philippines hosts the AVC Club Volleyball Championship.
- September 9, Wrestling – The World Wrestling Entertainment (WWE) returned to the Philippines for a one-night only event at the Mall of Asia Arena.
- September 10, Chess – Janelle Mae Frayna, a 20-year-old chess player from Legazpi City, becomes eligible to become a woman grandmaster after a good performance at the 42nd World Chess Olympiad at Baku, Azerbaijan. If confirmed by FIDE, she will become the first woman grandmaster of the Philippines.
- September 12, Table tennis – At the 2016 Summer Paralympics in Rio de Janeiro, Josephine Medina wins a bronze medal at the women's individual – Class 8 tournament for table tennis. It is the Philippines' second Paralympic medal overall after Adeline Dumapong won a bronze for powerlifting at the 2000 Summer Paralympics in Sydney, 16 years prior.
- September 15, Wrestling – Filipino-American wrestler T. J. Perkins was crowned as the winner of the WWE Cruiserweight Classic tournament. Perkins was also crowned as the inaugural WWE Cruiserweight Champion.
- October 18–23, Volleyball – The Philippines hosts the 10th FIVB Volleyball Women's Club World Championship at the SM Mall of Asia Arena in Pasay.
- November 6, Boxing – Manny Pacquiao defeats American boxer Jessie Vargas in Las Vegas to claim the World Boxing Organization's welterweight title.
- November 19–26, Football – The Philippines hosts the group stage of the 2016 AFF Suzuki Cup along with Myanmar.
- November 25 – Philippine Olympic Committee elections. Peping Cojuangco was re-elected as the committee's president after running unopposed.

== Entertainment and culture ==
- January 1 – The Iglesia ni Cristo claims three new Guinness World Records namely for the Largest Fireworks Display, Longest Line of Sparklers Lit in A Relay, and the Most Sparklers Lit Simultaneously during the "Countdown to 2016" grand New Year event at the Ciudad de Victoria in Bocaue, Bulacan.
- January 11, 13 – The House Committee on Metro Manila Development conducts an investigation over the disqualification of the film Honor Thy Father in the Best Picture category of the 2015 Metro Manila Film Festival and other irregularities.
- January 25 – President Aquino approves the privatization plans of the government-sequestered television network Intercontinental Broadcasting Corporation (IBC-13) thru public bidding.
- February 21 – Lav Diaz, director of the 8-hour length full feature film Hele sa Hiwagang Hapis, wins the Silver Bear: Alfred Bauer Prize for a feature film in the 66th Berlin International Film Festival.
- February 26 – Ten Filipinos, including singer Charice Pempengco and photographer Xyza Cruz Bacani, are part of the inaugural "30 Under 30 Asia" list released by Forbes Magazine.
- February 29 – Nora Aunor is recognized as one of the 6 Ani ng Dangal awardees by the National Commission for Culture and the Arts.
- March 6 – Felix Manalo, a bio-pic film of the life of the Iglesia ni Cristo's first executive minister Felix Manalo bags the Movie of the Year award of the 32nd PMPC Star Awards for Movies.
- April 17 – Maxine Medina, a graduate of the Philippine School of Interior Design with experience in designing residential condominiums and a model, is crowned as Miss Universe Philippines 2016 during the coronation night of the Binibining Pilipinas 2016 at the Smart Araneta Coliseum in Quezon City.
- May 22 – Jaclyn Jose wins the Cannes Film Festival Award for Best Actress at the 2016 Cannes Film Festival for her role in the film Ma' Rosa, becoming the first Filipina to win the award.
- June 11 – Imelda Schweighart of Puerto Princesa is crowned as Miss Philippines Earth 2016 during the coronation night held at the University of the Philippines Diliman Theater in Quezon City.
- June 12 – Filipino costume designer Clint Ramos wins the Tony Award for Best Costume Design in a Play at the 70th Tony Awards in New York City for his work on the Broadway play Eclipsed.
- June 22 – John Lloyd Cruz and LJ Reyes win the Best Actor and Actress awards, respectively, at the 39th Gawad Urian.
- July 2 – Young actress Teri Malvar earned more international recognition for her performance in the crime-drama Hamog (Haze), this time in the Moscow International Film Festival (MIFF).
- July 4 – John Lloyd Cruz has been recognized as one of 3 honorees of the Star Asia award at the 15th New York Asian Film Festival (NYAFF) for his film Honor Thy Father, becoming the first Filipino and Southeast Asian actor to receive the honor in the other hand actress Teri Malvar receives a Screen International Rising Star Asia award after she appears in Ralston Jover's Hamog.
- July 15 – President Rodrigo Duterte approves the proposal of Tourism Secretary Wanda Corazon Teo, to host the forthcoming Miss Universe pageant in the Philippines.
- July 17:
  - Filipino teen dance troupe Junior New System wins major awards at this year's World Championship of Performing Arts (WCOPA).
  - The all-male group Tres Kantos, consisting of Bugoy Drilon, Jovit Baldivino, and former Tawag ng Tanghalan contestant Dominador Aviola, also known as Daddy D, mentored by Erik Santos, are named the first winner of the celebrity competition We Love OPM during the show's live finale at Resorts World Manila.
- July 20 – Gabby Cabalic wins the Best Actor award at the 1st ToFarm Film Festival, held at the Makati Shangri-La, Manila.
- July 23 – Di Na Muli, interpreted by Itchyworms, wins this year's Philippine Popular Music Festival (PhilPop) held at the KIA Theater.
- July 30 – Ganiel Akrisha Krishnan, a sportscaster for ABS-CBN Sports & Action is crowned as Mutya ng Pilipinas-Asia Pacific during the coronation night held at the Resorts World Manila's Newport Performing Arts Theater.
- August 21 – Alden Richards and Maine Mendoza, collectively known as "AlDub", and Kathryn Bernardo and Daniel Padilla, collectively known as "KathNiel", and other Kapamilya and Kapuso personalities and programs are among the winners at the 2016 PEP List Awards night held at the Crowne Plaza Hotel.
- August 26–28 – The second edition of Asia Pop Comic Convention was held in SMX Convention Center. International celebrities Nicholas Hoult, Millie Bobby Brown, Claire Holt and Joe Dempsie attended the event.
- September 10 – Ang Babaeng Humayo, a revenge tale shot in black and white by director Lav Diaz, wins the top Golden Lion prize at the Venice Film Festival.
- October 27 – Miss Philippines Kylie Verzosa was crowned Miss International 2016 in the coronation night held at Tokyo Dome City Hall in Tokyo, Japan.

== Deaths ==
=== January ===
- January 4 – Stephen W. Bosworth, United States Ambassador to the Philippines during the People Power Revolution (b. 1939)
- January 8 – German Moreno, TV host, actor, talent manager (b. 1933)
- January 9 – Cielito del Mundo, original host of Kapwa Ko Mahal Ko and Mahal, actress (b. 1935)
- January 27 – Carlos Loyzaga, former basketball player and coach (b. 1930)
- January 29 – Cayetano Paderanga, Jr., former NEDA director-general (b. 1948)

=== February ===
- February 5 – Ciriaco Cañete, martial artist (Doce Pares Eskrima Club) (b. 1919)
- February 8 – Roy Señeres, OFW Family Club party-list representative (b. 1947)
- February 13 – Lauro Vizconde, Volunteers Against Crime and Corruption founding president and board of director, IBC-13 (b. 1938)
- February 21 – Luz Ocampo, pabalat artisan from Bulacan (b. 1922)
- February 26 – Thadeo Ouano, former Mayor of Mandaue (1998–2007) (b. 1944)
- February 29 – Wenn Deramas, film and television director (b. 1966)

=== March ===
- March 4 – Wenceslao "Peewee" Trinidad, former Mayor of Pasay (2000–06; 2007–10) (b. 1933)
- March 6 – Francis Xavier Pasion, film and television director (b. 1978)
- March 10:
  - Jovito Salonga, former Senate of the Philippines president (b. 1920)
  - Andrew Gotianun, Filinvest Development Corporation chairman (b. 1927)
- March 11 – Antonio Cabangon Chua, former Philippine ambassador to Laos (b. 1934)
- March 29 – Gabriel C. Singson, former Governor of the Bangko Sentral ng Pilipinas (b. 1929)
- March 31 – Leonard Mayaen, Governor of Mountain Province (b. 1953)

=== April ===
- April 14 – Rod Reyes, former vice president and general manager, GMA Radio Television Arts (b. 1935)
- April 27 – Julio Xavier Labayen, Bishop Emeritus of the Roman Catholic Territorial Prelature of Infanta (b. 1926)
- April 29 – Renato Corona, 23rd Chief Justice of the Supreme Court (2010–12) (b. 1948)

=== May ===
- May 3 – Domingo Siazon, Jr., 18th Secretary of Foreign Affairs (1995–2001) and Philippine ambassador to Japan (2001–05) (b. 1939)
- May 18 – Eduardo Castrillo, sculptor (b. 1942)
- May 27 – Alex Balcoba, journalist (b. 1961)

=== June ===
- June 13 – Tet Garcia, elected Vice Governor of Bataan (b. 1940)
- June 20 – Ernesto Maceda, 18th President of the Senate (1996–98) and former Philippine ambassador to the United States (b. 1935)
- June 30 – Tupay Loong, Sulu first district representative (b. 1947)

=== July ===
- July 3 – Gilbert Bulawan, PBA basketball player (Blackwater Elite) (b. 1986)
- July 14 – Helena Benitez, former Senator and administrator of the Philippine Women's University (b. 1914)

=== August ===
- August 4 – Snaffu Rigor, veteran composer (b. 1947)
- August 17 – Baby Dalupan, former PBA coach and player (b. 1923)
- August 20 – Lilia Cuntapay, actress (b. 1935)

=== September ===
- September 10 – Joy Viado, comedian (b. 1959)
- September 29 – Miriam Defensor Santiago, politician (b. 1945)

=== October ===
- October 11 – Dick Israel, actor (b. 1947)

=== November ===
- November 5 – Rolando Espinosa, Mayor of Albuera, Leyte
- November 11:
  - Jum Jainudin Akbar, Basilan lone district representative
  - Ronnie Nathanielsz, sports analyst and sportswriter (b. 1934 or 1935)
- November 21 – Blakdyak, singer, actor, comedian (b. 1969)

=== December ===
- December 18 – Bobby Guanzon, Filipino journalist and politician, cardiac arrest (b. 1948)

== See also ==
- List of years in the Philippines
- Timeline of Philippine history
