= 2016 in Philippine sports =

The following is a list of notable events and developments that are related to Philippine sports in 2016.

== Events ==
=== 2016 Philippine Olympic Committee Elections ===
- November 25 – Peping Cojuangco formally claimed his fourth term as Philippine Olympic Committee after winning the elections unopposed at the Wack Wack Golf and Country Club.

=== Baseball ===
- February 11–12 – The Philippines national baseball team bowed out in the 2017 World Baseball Classic – Qualification first leg in Sydney after two straight losses by Australia and New Zealand in the elimination phase.
- March 14 – The La Salle Green Batters beats the three-peat champions Ateneo Blue Batters in the finals of UAAP Season 78 baseball tournament marking the first championship title of DLSU in 13 years.

=== Basketball ===
==== Professional ====
The San Miguel Beermen huddle after Game 6 of the 2015–16 PBA Philippine Cup Finals.

- January 20 – The Philippine Basketball Association (PBA) Board unanimously approves the sale of the Barako Bull Energy team franchise to Davao-based petroleum firm Phoenix Petroleum. Phoenix Petroleum PBA Team, composed of former Barako Bull players and coaching staff, had started playing in the 2016 PBA Commissioner's Cup.
- February 3 – The San Miguel Beermen claims the 2015–16 PBA Philippine Cup title after beating the Alaska Aces in the finals series. The Beermen is the first PBA team to come back from a 0–3 deficit.
- February 13 – Returning Tropang TNT import Ivan Johnson fined ₱250,000 and has been banned from playing the PBA after cursing and disrespecting league commissioner Chito Narvasa in a game against Meralco Bolts. Johnson, later apologizes to Narvasa due to the incident. It was shortened into a one-season suspension and the fine reduced into ₱150,000.
- March 3 – Former PBA head coach Joel Banal appoints as the new league commissioner of the Pilipinas Commercial Basketball League (PCBL), replacing Ato Badolato.
- May 16 – The Rain or Shine Elasto Painters defeated the Alaska Aces in game 6 of the 2016 PBA Commissioner's Cup Finals to win their second title. Paul Lee was named finals MVP.
- May 28 – The Philippines won the 2016 SEABA Cup and a slot in the 2016 FIBA Asia Challenge.
- June 25–26 – Retired NBA superstar Kobe Bryant visits the Philippines for the Nike's Mamba Mentality Tour.
- July 5–10 – The Philippines co-hosts the 2016 FIBA World Olympic Qualifying Tournament for Men at the SM Mall of Asia Arena in Pasay.
- July 7 – The Philippines men's national basketball team end their bid to qualify for the 2016 Summer Olympics after losing 80–89 to the New Zealand men's national basketball team in Group B of the 2016 FIBA World Olympic Qualifying Tournament.
- July 15 – Janine Nicandro, a PBA Developmental League former referee, is appointed as the first female referee of the PBA.
- July 16 – The Blackwater Elite has retired the No. 11 jersey of the late forward Gilbert Bulawan in a brief ceremony before their first game of the Governors' Cup.
- July 31 The Mighty Sports team representing the Philippines in the 2016 William Jones Cup swept the tournament for their first international title and the Philippines' fifth gold overall.
- August 8 – Al Panlilio is elected president of the Samahang Basketbol ng Pilipinas (SBP) replacing Manny V. Pangilinan.
- September 14 – The Philippines ended its run in the FIBA Asia Challenge with its worst record as the country was represented by amateurs due to conflicting schedule with the national league and mismanagement of Samahang Basketbol ng Pilipinas.
- September 25 – Philippines women's national basketball team won their second title after by defeating the host country Malaysia in the championship match of 2016 SEABA Championship for Women.
- October 19 – Barangay Ginebra San Miguel wins the 2016 PBA Governors' Cup title, beating the Meralco Bolts 4–2 in the finals. This ends their 8-year championship drought.

==== Collegiate ====
- January 21 – Aspirant's Cup, the first conference of the 2016 season of the PBA D-League, commences with nine competing teams.
- February 1
  - The San Sebastian Stags appoints CEU Scorpions coach Egay Macaraya as their new head coach in preparation for NCAA Season 92 basketball tournament.
  - UST Growling Tigers coach Bong dela Cruz denies the involvement on game-fixing and physical abuse incidents against his players during his tenure as head coach.
- June 25 – San Beda College officially retires the No. 14 jersey of the late, Carlos Loyzaga, who led the Red Lions to multiple NCAA championships in the 1950s and was the cornerstone of the national team in the 1950s and the 1960s.
- October 11 – The San Beda Red Lions prevailed in a classic shootout in the fourth quarter to stave off the gritty Arellano Chiefs, 83–73, and become the NCAA Season 92 men's basketball champions at the Mall of Asia Arena.
- December 7 – The DLSU Green Archers capped a dominant campaign with a 79–72 victory over the Ateneo Blue Eagles to win the UAAP Season 79 men's basketball championship at Araneta Coliseum.

==== High school ====
- March 4 – The National University Bullpups scores a victory after beating De La Salle Zobel in the finals of the UAAP Season 78 juniors basketball tournament, reclaims their championship after one season.
- March 13–17 – The national championships of the NBTC League were held at the SM Mall of Asia Arena, Pasay. High school teams from the country collided for the championship.

==== Exhibition ====
- February 4 – Former UAAP two-time MVP Kiefer Ravena led the Mighty Sports team as they reclaims the Republica Cup title after beating powerhouse Hobe Macway team in the finals game held in Malolos, Bulacan.

==== Women's Basketball ====
- January 9 – Blackwater Elite women's basketball team (Allana Lim, Camille Sambille, France Mae Cabinbin and Camilla Denise Escoto) rules the inaugural 2015–16 PBA Dickies Women's 3x3 Basketball tournament, after beating Ginebra in Finals Game 2, 7–3.

=== Boxing ===
- February 17 – Nike drops Filipino boxing champion Manny Pacquiao on the list of endorsers of the shoe brand due to the Boxer-politician's stand against Same-sex marriage.
- February 20 – Jonathan Refugio upsets against Richard Claveras to win the World Boxing Council (WBC) International light flyweight title, after a unanimous decision victory on their fight held in Taguig Sports Complex.
- February 28 – Filipino boxers Mark Magsayo and Albert Pagara both scored double victories, after beating their opponents via knockout and unanimous decision in Pinoy Pride 35 held at the Waterfront Hotel and Casino, Cebu.
- April 10 – Filipino boxing champion and United Nationalist Alliance senatorial candidate Manny Pacquiao defeats Timothy Bradley for the third time. It was Pacquiao's last fight in his professional boxing career.
- April 23 – Nonito Donaire defeats Zsolt Bedak via technical knockout in Cebu City.
- May 25 – Johnriel Casimero defeats Thai boxer Amnat Ruenroeng to claim the International Boxing Federation's flyweight title in Beijing, China.
- May 28 – Donnie Nietes retains his light flyweight title from the World Boxing Organization, after defeating Mexican boxer Raúl García into submission after five rounds at the La Salle Coliseum in Bacolod.
- July 10 – Jason Pagara defeats Mexican boxer Abraham Alvarez, via knockout in the third round of their welterweight showdown in the co-main event of Pinoy Pride 37: Fists of the Future in San Mateo Events Center in San Mateo, California, but his younger brother Albert Pagara suffered the first defeat of his career after he was knocked out by Cesar Juarez at round 8.
- July 27 – Marlon Tapales of Lala, Lanao del Norte defeats Thai boxer Pungluang Sor Singyu via knockout in Thailand to claim the World Boxing Organization's bantamweight title.
- August 9 – Ricky Vargas stepped down as the president of the Alliance of Boxing Associations in the Philippines (ABAP) following the lackluster performance of Filipino boxers in the Olympic Games in Rio de Janeiro.
- September 25 – Donnie Nietes defeats Edgar Sosa by unanimous decision while Mark Magsayo extends his undefeated streak to 15–0 against Ramiro Robles in the main event of Pinoy Pride 38 at the StubHub Center in Carson, California.
- November 6 – Manny Pacquiao defeats American boxer Jessie Vargas in Las Vegas to claim the World Boxing Organization's welterweight title.
- November 27 – Milan Melindo won the interim IBF junior flyweight title by gutting out a hard-fought decision against Fahlan Sakkreerin Jr. of Thailand at the main event of Pinoy Pride 39: Road to Redemption at the Cebu Coliseum.

=== Collegiate sports ===
- January 13 – The 23rd season of the National Capital Region Athletic Association, with the theme "Green and Go at 23", opens at the De La Salle University-Dasmarinas Gym. Basketball and Volleyball are the primary sports of the collegiate sports event.
- March 25 – The NCAA Season 91 cheerleading competition and closing ceremonies were simultaneously held at the SM Mall of Asia Arena, Pasay.
- September 3 – The UAAP Season 79 was opened. The University of Santo Tomas become the season's host.
- November 19 – National University Pep Squad wins the UAAP Season 79 Cheerdance Competition held at the Smart Araneta Coliseum.

=== Cockfighting ===
- January 30 – February 7 − Known as the biggest cockfighting event in the world, The 6th World Slasher Cup, an invitational 8-cock derby featuring fighting cocks from 15 countries, is held at the Smart Araneta Coliseum, Quezon City.

=== Cycling ===
- February 18–21 – The 2016 4-stage Le Tour de Filipinas was kicked off. However, the Stage 1 of the UCI-sanctioned cycling event temporarily stopped by the race organizers due to road repairs by the DPWH and traffic jam in the Tiaong, Quezon area. After four stages (Antipolo–Legazpi), Kazakh rider Oleg Zemlyakov of Vino 4ever Sko crowns as the champion of the LTdF 2016.
- February–April – The 6th season of the Ronda Pilipinas kicks-off with three separate legs in Mindanao, Visayas and Luzon.
- March 17–20 – Tagaytay hosts the World University Cycling Championship.

=== Esports ===
- June 7–12 – The Philippines hosting the Manila Major 2016 held at the Mall of Asia Arena

=== Freestyle football ===
- December 10 – Davao City hosts the 4th Asian Freestyle Football Championship, the first time the country hosts the tournament. Filipino Philip Warren Gertsson defeats Japanese football freestyler, Yo Kamatsuka in the final.

=== Football ===
- January 31 – Negros Occidental FA beats Davao FA, 1-nil to take home to inaugural crown of the PFF Smart U-22 Amateur Football Championship held in Bacolod.
- February 6 – FEU-Diliman reclaims the title of the UAAP Junior's Football tournament after beating Ateneo, 6–1.
- November 19–26 – The Philippines hosts the group stage of the 2016 AFF Suzuki Cup along with Myanmar.

=== Golf ===
- January 8 – Jobim Carlos claims his 2nd straight championship title in the men's division of Philippine Amateur (Stroke Play) Open Golf Championship. Carlos will be moving to the professional ranks after the tournament.
- January 22 – Princess Superal, pools a 214 one-shot and wins the title of the Philippine Ladies Open Golf Championship at Tagaytay Midlands ending the domination of Thailand female golfers in the tournament.

=== Horse racing ===
- January 17 – "Low Profile" (owned by Narciso Morales and ridden by Mark Alvarez) swept other opponents and won the 2016 Philracom Commissioner's Cup held in the Metro Turf Racing Club, in Malvar, Batangas.

=== Marathon/Duathlon/Triathlon events ===
- January 10 – Mark Anthony Oximar of Antipolo and Cinderella Agana-Lorenzo of Roxas, Capiz wins the 21-kilometer men's and women's divisions in the 12th Bull Run, organized by the Philippine Stock Exchange.
- February 6
  - Runners participate in the Million Volunteer Run 3, organized by the Philippine Red Cross (PRC), simultaneously held in 59 sites in the country, particularly in the SM Mall of Asia Complex, Bonifacio Global City, Marikina Heights and Quezon City Memorial Circle.
  - Triathlete Bradley Weiss of South Africa defends his title of the XTERRA Off-road Triathlon held in Legazpi, Albay.
- February 7 – More than 20,000 runners participate in the 2016 Condura Skyway "Run for Hero" Marathon for the benefit of HERO Foundation. Two runners, including a Philippine Army major collapsed, and later died during the race.

=== Mixed Martial Arts ===
- January 16 – Jenel Lausa bags the vacant Pacific Xtreme Combat flyweight belt after his victory over Team Lakay's Crisanto Pitpitunge in the main fight of PXC 51 held at the Solaire Resort & Casino.
- January 29 − Geje Eustaquio of Team Lakay knocks out Malaysian MMA artist Saiful Merican in an undercard fight of ONE Championship: Clash of Heroes held in Stadium Negara in Kuala Lumpur, Malaysia. Another Team Lakay fighter Eduard Folayang defeats Tetsuya Yamada via decision in the co-main event.
- February 20 – Filipino MMA fighter Jimmy "The Spencer" Yabo defeated Bashir Ahmad after a perfectly 21-second knockout victory in the undercard of One: Tribe of Warriors held in Jakarta, Indonesia.
- April 23 – The Universal Reality Combat Championship (URCC) will hold its maiden event for 2016 entitled "URCC 27: Rebellion" to be held at the Marriot Hotel Grand Ballroom, Pasay.
- June 26 – Actors Baron Geisler and Kiko Matos faced each other in an exhibition match as part of the URCC: Fight Night at the Valkyrie at the Palace, Taguig, which was ended in a unanimous draw, scoring 19–19 by the match judges.

=== Multi-sporting events ===
- January 22 – KABAKA's founder and Manila mayoralty candidate Amado Bagatsing officially opens the 7th KABAKA INter-Schools Sportsfest at the Cuneta Astrodome, Pasay. Athletes from 40 elementary and high schools in Manila competed in basketball, volleyball, chess and dance competitions.
- February 13 – March 5 – Sporting teams from the companies under the group of Manuel V. Pangilinan competes in different sports in the 7th MVP Olympics.
- March 7–11 – The Philippine National Games are held in Pangasinan.
- April 9–16 – The Albay province hosted the 2016 Palarong Pambansa.
- July 27–28 – The inaugural edition of the Philippine Beach Games was held at the SM Sands by the Bay, Pasay, coinciding with the POC Olympic Day.
- August 6–22 – The Philippine delegation, consisting of 13 athletes in eight different sports, participates at the 2016 Summer Olympics in Rio de Janeiro, Brazil.

=== Motorsports ===
- June 18–19 – Monster Jam returns to the Philippines for a two-day event held at the SM Mall of Asia Arena.

=== Powerlifting ===
- January 30–31 – National powerlifter Mark Espino achieves the new 280 kg. record in squat during the two-day Duaform 5-in-1 Powerlifting Championships held in Robinson's Townmall, Malabon.

=== Rugby union ===
- December 14–17 – The Philippines hosts the Division 1 tournament of the 2016 U-19 Asia Rugby Championship.

=== Squash ===
- January 11–17 – The Philippines squash team under the helm of Squash Rackets Association of the Philippines (SRAP), claims one gold, one silver and two bronze medals in the 2nd South East Asian Cup Squash Championship held in Kuala Lumpur, Malaysia.

=== Speed skating ===
- February 21 – Kathryn Magno won the first gold medal for the Philippines in an international tournament hosted outside the country by winning the 500m women's event at the 2016 ISU South East Asia Cup. She later won two more gold medals in the 1,500m and 1,000m events.

=== Swimming ===
- February 7–9 – The swimmers from the Philippine Swimming League (PSL) bags 26 overall medals (13 golds, 7 silvers and 6 bronzes) in the 2016 Tokyo Winter Swimming Championship held in Tokyo, Japan.

=== Table tennis ===
- September 12 – Josephine Medina wins a bronze medal at the women's individual – Class 8 tournament for table tennis at the 2016 Summer Paralympics in Rio de Janeiro, Brazil. It is the Philippines' second Paralympic medal overall after Adeline Dumapong won a bronze for powerlifting at the 2000 Summer Paralympics in Sydney, 16 years prior.

=== Taekwondo ===
- April 16–17 – The Asian Taekwondo Olympic Qualification Tournament is hosted by Manila.

=== Tennis ===
- January 8 – Young tennis players Jake Martin and Alexandra Eala dominates the boys and girls 16-under divisions of the 27th Andrada Cup age-group tennis championships at the Rizal Memorial Tennis Center.
- January 18–24 – The inaugural tournament of the Manila Challenger is held in the newly renovated Rizal Memorial Tennis Center. Former Top 8 best tennis player Mikhail Youzhny bags the inaugural Challenger's singles division title, while the tandem of Johan Brunström and Frederik Nielsen copped the doubles title.
- February 27 – The National University Bulldogs men's and women's tennis teams claims their back-to-back championship in both divisions of the UAAP Season 78 lawn tennis tournament.

=== Volleyball ===
- January 10 – 60 13-and-under and 17-and-under teams from Metro Manila competes in the 20th Women's Volleyball League, organized by the BEST Center. Larong Volleyball sa Pilipinas, Inc. (LVPI) president Joey Romasanta was the guest speaker of the opening ceremonies.
- January 26 – The UPHSD Altas claims the NCAA men's volleyball title for Season 91 after beating EAC Generals in a five-setter do-or-die match, 25–22, 23–25, 29–27, 22–25, 17–15. Perpetual Help's Rey Taneo, Jr. hailed as the Finals MVP while EAC's Howard Mojica is the Season's MVP.
- January 28 − The Benilde Blazers seals their first championship title in the NCAA women's volleyball in Season 91 against thrice-to-beat San Sebastian Lady Stags in 4 games. Jeanette Panaga acclaimed the Finals MVP title.
- January 31 – The UAAP Season 78 volleyball tournaments officially opens at the Filoil Flying V Arena, San Juan.
- February 6–7 – Team Circle claims the inaugural title of the 1st Quezon City Pride Volleyball Cup, organized by the Quezon City Pride Council and the Philippine Super Liga, claimed to be as the first volleyball league in the Philippines for the LGBT community.
- February 18 – The 2016 PSL Invitational Cup opens at the Filoil Flying V Arena, San Juan. 7 teams including two new expansion teams and a guest team from Thailand will be compete in the tournament.
- April 9 – The RC Cola-Army Troopers and the Est Cola (also as the co-champion) was claimed their championship after the team won the Finals title of the 2016 PSL Invitational Cup during set 4. Jovelyn Gonzaga proclaimed as the Finals MVP
- April 30 – The DLSU Lady Spikers claim their ninth championship trophy after winning the UAAP Season 78 women's volleyball tournaments against the Ateneo Lady Eagles, 19–25, 25–21, 25–16, 25–16, at the Smart Araneta Coliseum in Quezon City.
- July 18 – The Pocari Sweat Lady Warriors won their first championship in the Shakey's V-League 13th Season Open Conference during the league's Open Conference Myla Pablo was awarded as finals' MVP, Grethcel Soltones received the season MVP
- September 3–11 – The Philippines hosts the AVC Club Volleyball Championship.
- October 4 – Executive Secretary Salvador Medialdea issues Memorandum Circular No. 9, directing all government agencies and instrumentalities, including government-owned or controlled corporations, and encouraging local government units, to extend support to the 2016 Federation Internationale de Volleyball Women's Club World Championship.
- October 11 – President Rodrigo Duterte declares October 2016 as 'Volleyball Month'.
- October 18–23 – The Philippines hosts the 10th FIVB Volleyball Women's Club World Championship at the SM Mall of Asia Arena in Pasay.

==== Beach volleyball ====
- January 30–31 – The inaugural event of the Beach Volleyball Republic On Tour held at the Cabugao Beach Resort in Cabugao, Ilocos Sur. Jovelyn Gonzaga and Nerissa Bautista of Philippine Army crown as the champions of the two-day event.
- February 14 – The San Sebastian Stags women's beach volleyball team of Gretchel Soltones and Alyssa Eroa crowns as the champions of the NCAA Season 91 women's beach volleyball tournament held in Subic, Zambales. Mapua Cardinals bags the championship title in the men's division.

=== Weightlifting ===
- August 7 – Hidilyn Diaz wins a silver medal at the Women's 53 kg event for weightlifting at the 2016 Summer Olympics in Rio de Janeiro, Brazil. It is the Philippines' tenth Olympic medal overall and the first since the 1996 Summer Olympics in Atlanta, 20 years prior.

=== Wrestling ===
- September 9 – The World Wrestling Entertainment (WWE) returned to the Philippines for a one-night only event at the Mall of Asia Arena.
- September 15 – Filipino-American wrestler T. J. Perkins was crowned as the winner of the WWE Cruiserweight Classic tournament. Perkins was also crowned as the inaugural WWE Cruiserweight Champion.

== Recognitions ==
Philippine Sports Hall of Fame 2016, organized by the Philippine Sports Commission, held on January 25, 2016, at Century Park Hotel, Manila.

Recipient	Sport
Felicisimo Ampon	Tennis
Kurt Bachmann	Basketball
Jacinto Cayco	Swimming
Haydee Coloso-Espino	Swimming
Salvador del Rosario	Weightlifting
Raymundo Deyro	Lawn Tennis
Adolfo Feliciano	Shooting
Martin Gison	Shooting
Isaac Gomez	Athletics
Johnny Jose	Lawn Tennis
Mohammad Mala	Swimming
Ed Ocampo	Basketball
Gerardo Rosario	Swimming
Inocencia Solis	Athletics
Mona Sulaiman	Athletics
Mariano Tolentino	Basketball
Eugene Torre	Chess

Collegiate Basketball Awards, organized by the UAAP-NCAA Press Corps, held on January 26, 2016, at Saisaki-Kamayan in Greenhills, San Juan.

Award	Recipient	Reference
Smart Player of the Year	Mac Belo (FEU Tamaraws)	
Mythical Five	Kiefer Ravena (Ateneo Blue Eagles)	
Mythical Five	Allwell Oraeme (Mapua Cardinals)	
Mythical Five	Kevin Ferrer (UST Growling Tigers)	
Mythical Five	Scottie Thompson (UPHSD Altas)	
Mythical Five	Mac Belo (FEU Tamaraws)	
Super Senior Awards	Baser Amer (San Beda Red Lions)	
Super Senior Awards	Mark Cruz (Letran Knights)	
Super Senior Awards	Mike Tolomia (FEU Tamaraws)	
Pivotal Player of the Year	Kevin Racal (Letran Knights)	
Pivotal Player of the Year	Roger Pogoy (FEU Tamaraws)	
Impact Player of the Year	Art dela Cruz (San Beda Red Lions)	
Impact Player of the Year	Ed Daquioag (UST Growling Tigers)	
ACCEL Court General	Jiovanni Jalalon (Arellano Chiefs)	
Gatorade Energy Player	Jeron Teng (DLSU Green Archers)	
Coach of the Year	Aldin Ayo (Letran Knights)	
Coach of the Year	Nash Racela (FEU Tamaraws)	
Lifetime Achievement Award	Aric del Rosario (UPHSD Altas)	

2016 PSA Annual Awards, organized by Philippine Sportswriters Association held on February 13, 2016, at the One Esplanade, Pasay.

Award	Winner	Sport/Team	References
Sportsmen of the Year	Nonito Donaire	Boxing	
Sportsmen of the Year	Donnie Nietes	Boxing	
Sportsmen of the Year	Miguel Tabuena	Golf	
President's Award	Gilas Pilipinas (Philippines men's national basketball team)	Basketball	
Mr. Basketball	Calvin Abueva	Basketball (Alaska Aces/Gilas Pilipinas)	
Mr. Basketball	Terrence Romeo	Basketball (GlobalPort Batang Pier/Gilas Pilipinas)	
Ms. Volleyball	Alyssa Valdez	Volleyball (Ateneo Lady Eagles/PLDT/National Team)	
NSA of the Year	Wushu Federation of the Philippines (WFP)	Wushu	
Lifetime Achievement Award	Filomeno Codiñera	Baseball/Softball	
Executive of the Year	Wilfred Uytengsu	Basketball (Alaska Aces governor)	

2015 Spin.PH Sports Awards, organized by Sports Interactive Network Philippines (Spin.ph), held on January 30, 2016, at Marriot Hotel, Pasay.

Award	Winner	Sport/Team	References
Sportsman of the Year	Calvin Abueva	Basketball	
Sportsman Who Change The Game	Alyssa Valdez	Volleyball	
Sportsman Who Take the Lead	Tab Baldwin	Basketball (Philippines men's national basketball team coach)	
Sportsmen Who Succeed As One	Letran Knights	Basketball	
Sportsman Who Embody the Filipino Fighting Spirit	Donnie Nietes	Boxing	
Sportsman Who Inspire Hope	Kobe Paras	Basketball	
Sportsman Who Defy The Odds	Ernie Gawilan	Swimming (A PWD swimmer)	
Sportsmen Who Care	UP Fighting Maroons	Basketball	
Sportsman Who Excel Academically	JR Gallanza	Basketball	
Sportsman Who Make It Happen	Manuel V. Pangilinan	Basketball (President of Samahang Basketbol ng Pilipinas)	

13th Golden Wheel Awards, organized by the Golden Wheel Foundation, held on February 27, 2016, at the Samsung Hall, SM Aura Premier, Taguig.

Award	Winner
13th Golden Wheel Driver of the Year	
Hall of Fame Awardee	Jose Armando Eduque

== Deaths ==
January

- January 16 – Hermie Rivera, veteran boxing journalist and manager of Luisito Espinosa (b. 1938)
- January 27 – Carlos Loyzaga, former basketball player and coach (b. 1930)

February

- February 5 – Ciriaco Cañete, Cebuano Eskrima artist (b. 1919)
- February 18 – Victorico Chaves, former president of the Philippine Amateur Volleyball Association (b.1933)

March

- March 22 – Cecil Hecanova, former Philippine Sports Commission chairman (1990–1992)

July

- July 3 – Gilbert Bulawan, Filipino basketball player (b. 1986)
- July 13 – Jonas Mariano, Filipino basketball player (b. 1971)

August

- August 17 – Baby Dalupan, former PBA coach and player (b. 1923)

October

- October 25 – Filomeno Codiñera, former Filipino baseball and softball player (b. 1939).

December

- December 14 – Mariano Ong, former Filipino Olympic sports shooter (b. 1938).
- December 21 – Benjie Castro, radio sports broadcaster (b. 1956)
- December 27 – Bong Go, former basketball coach (b. 1938).

== See also ==
- 2016 in the Philippines
- 2016 in sports
