= Lakbayan ng Pambansang Minorya =

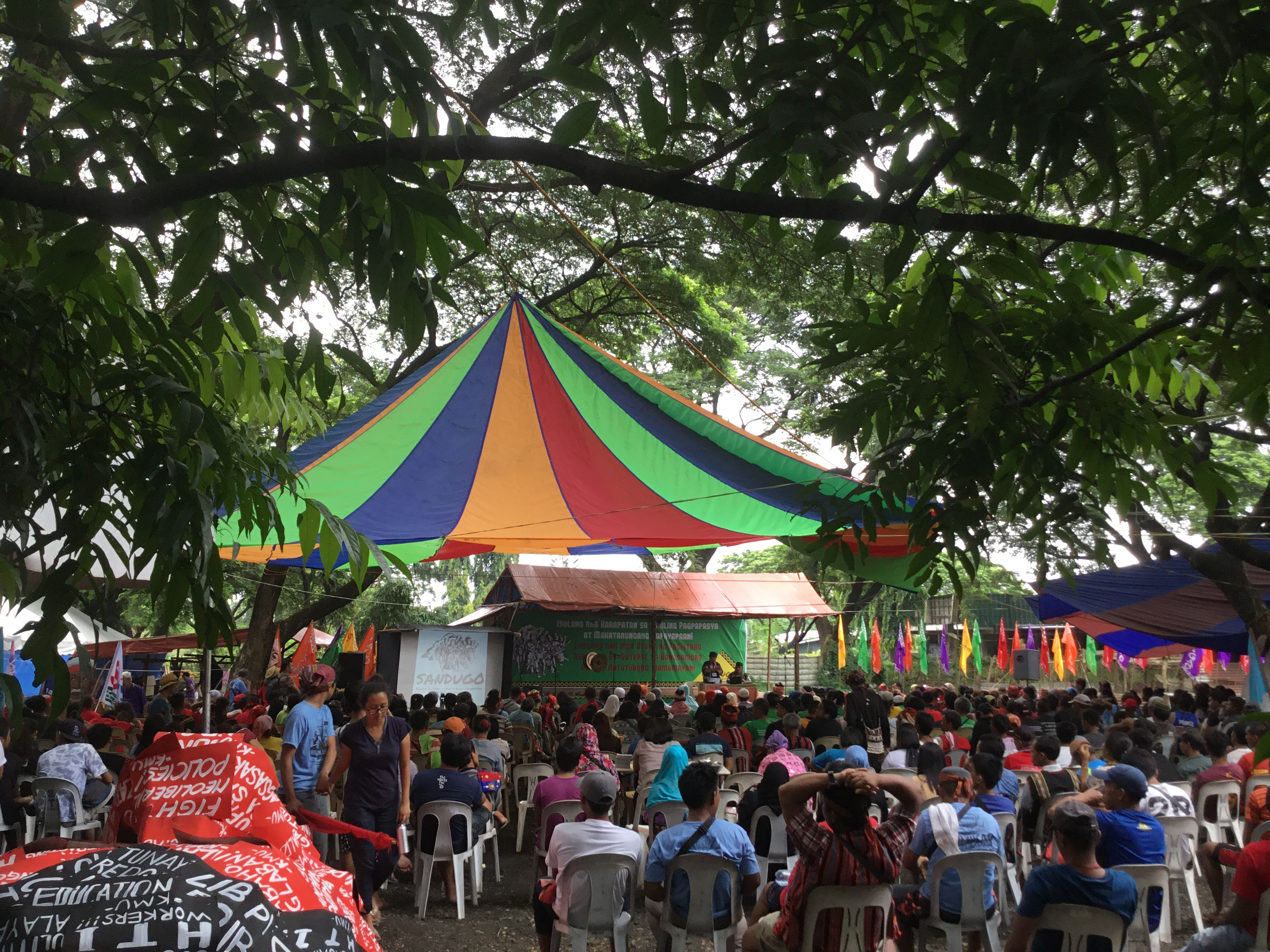
- 2017 Camp-out within University of the Philippines Diliman
- Date: Every year, October–November
- Location: Metro Manila, other major cities
- Participants: Lumad, Moro, Mangyan, Igorot, Aeta, other minority groups of the Philippines

The Lakbayan ng Pambansang Minorya (transl. Journey of the National Minorities) is an annual march, rally, and camp-out (kampuhan) by minority peoples of the Philippines, including Lumad, Aeta, Mangyan, Moro, and Igorot, coming from their respective homelands. It is held in Manila and other major cities from October–November, to protest against human rights violations, lack of self-determination, exploitation of ancestral lands, and lack of basic social services within communities of indigenous peoples. The yearly event, which started in 2012 (as Manilakbayan, a combination of words Manila and Lakbayan), is organized by SANDUGO, with the backing of various militant, progressive, and other allied groups. The participants have been termed as Lakbayani (combination of words lakbay and bayani, meaning hero).

== Background ==
Because of the marginalized situation of indigenous peoples in the Philippines, many affected by militarization, environmental degradation, resource plunder, and the ongoing counter-insurgency war of the Philippine government, they have been forced to evacuate or become "bakwit" (a colloquial term) to schools, churches, and other evacuation centers. This situation has been ongoing long before the first Lakbayan.

== Yearly Lakbayan ==
=== 2015 ===
On September 1, 2015, Emerito Samarca, was killed by alleged members of the Magahat-Bagani paramilitary group backed by the Armed Forces of the Philippines (AFP). He was a human rights defender, as well as the director of the Lumad school Alternative Learning Center for Agricultural and Livelihood Development (ALCADEV) of Surigao del Sur. Two days before, the paramilitary forces warned the community of a massacre. A day before, residents and school staff evacuated out of fear for their safety. About 3,000 to 4,000 individuals were affected and evacuated to Tandag, the provincial capital. This became a major reason for the Manilakbayan 2015, where these evacuees and other minority groups converged in Manila and other cities to air their grievances and to hold protests at government offices.

Indigenous peoples of Mindanao arrived in Manila on October 25, after their march from their respective communities. The next day, the University of the Philippines Diliman welcomed about 700 Lumad for the university to serve as a host for the minority peoples for a week. The ritual was termed as Salubungan (welcoming), with the Lakbayanis shaking hands with the hosts. The protesters, their supporters, and volunteers built a camp within the university. The activities included sit-in discussions regarding their culture and issues, various programs, feasts, and games.

On November 17, Manila Archbishop Cardinal Luis Antonio Tagle made a surprise visit at the Manilakbayan camp in Liwasang Bonifacio. He called for both military and communist rebels to stay away from Lumad areas, but he also said, "we’re all to blame for what’s happening to our lumad brethren in Mindanao."

=== 2016 ===
The 2016 Lakbayan, for the first time, included and highlighted the Moros or the Muslim people. Their participation within the movement also stems from similar experiences from the Lumads, as well as issues concerning the Autonomous Region in Muslim Mindanao and the Bangsamoro Basic Law.

A protest action in front of the US Embassy in Manila, held on October 19, against American imperialism and its manifestations through resource exploitation and the counter-insurgency guide Oplan Bayanihan, turned violent. A police car rammed into the protesters when the mobilization was about to end. Fifty were injured, while 29 were nabbed by the police.

=== 2017 ===
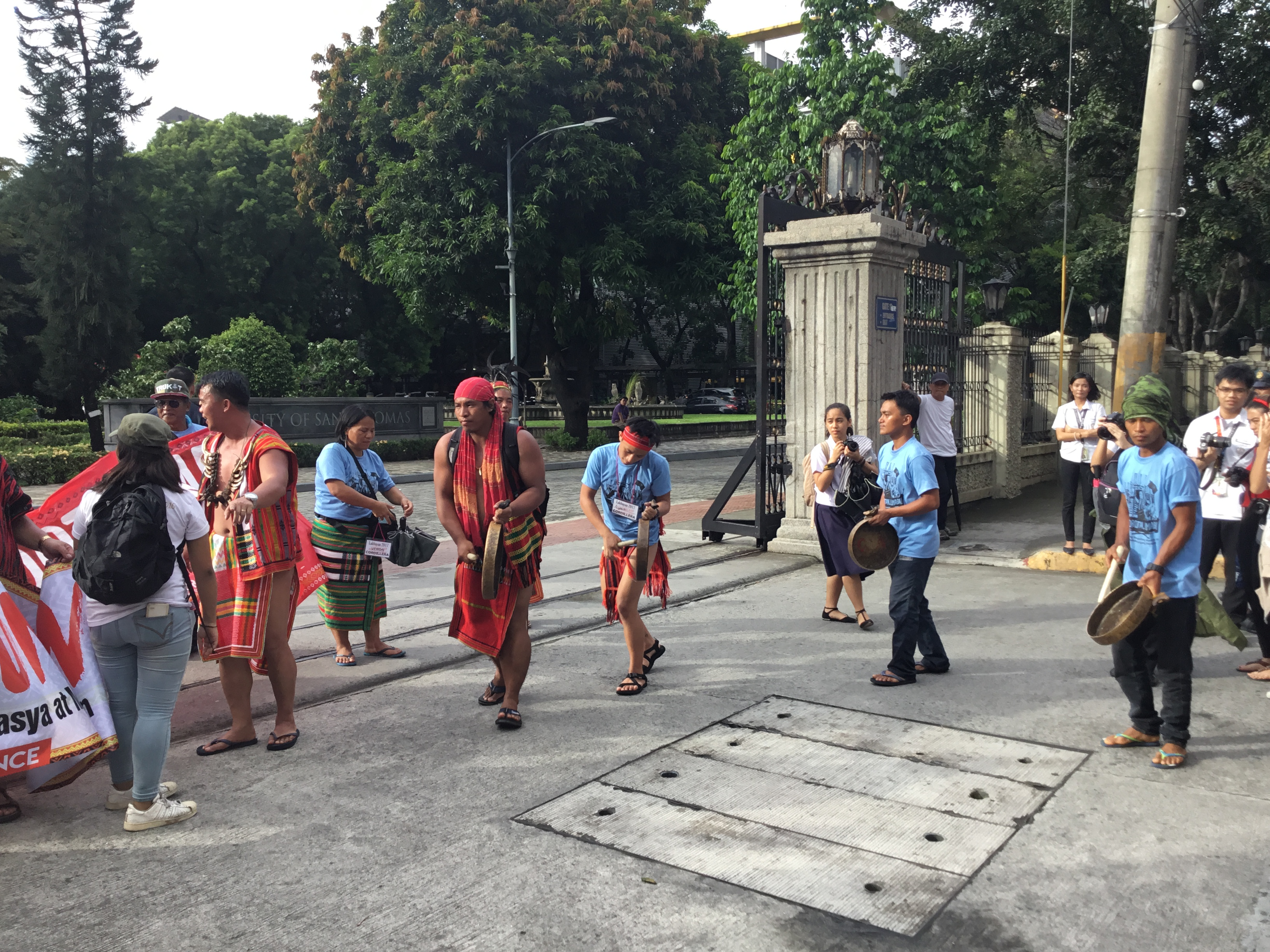
Protest and cultural action in front of the University of Santo Tomas

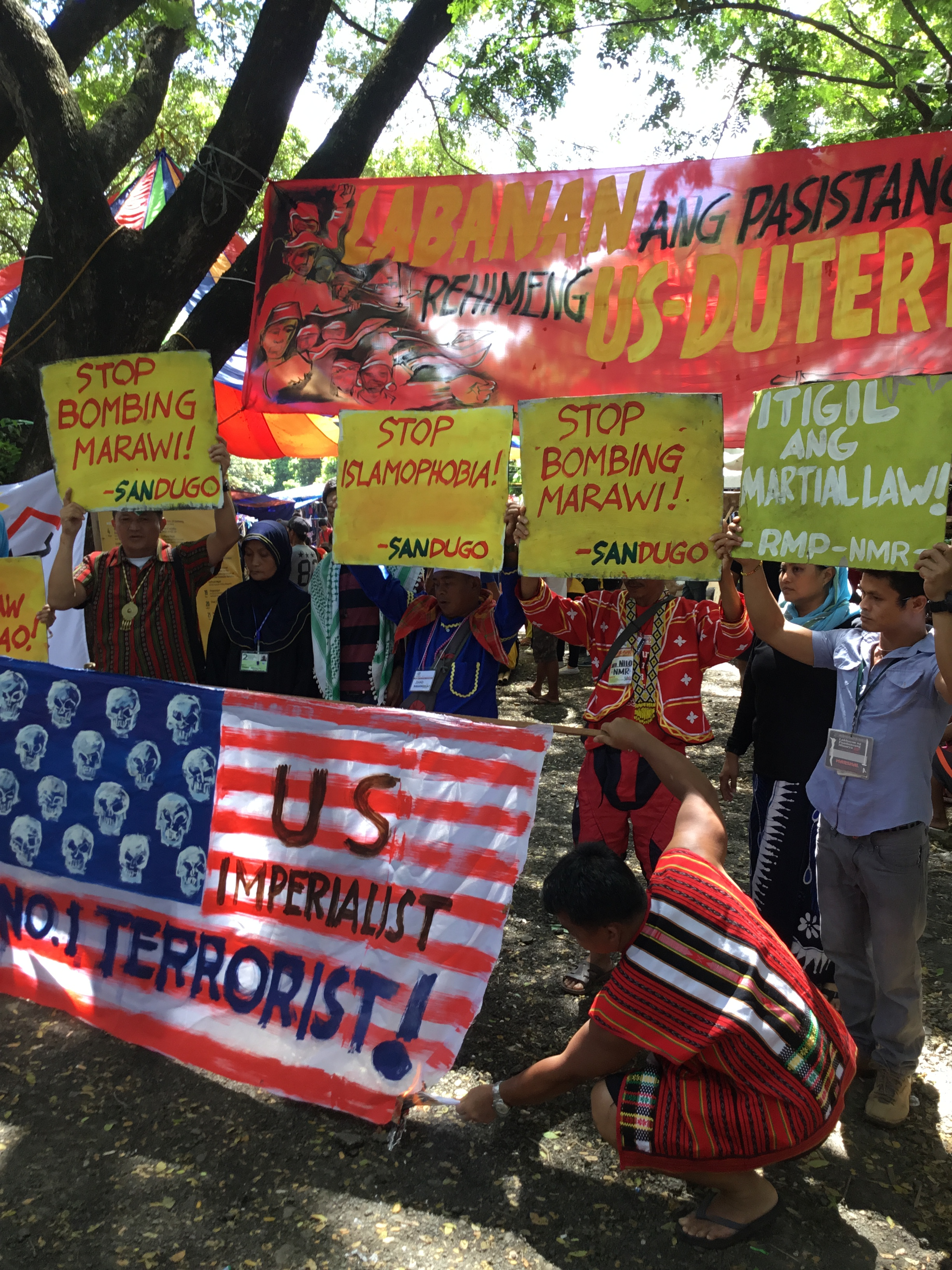
Indigenous peoples and their calls during Lakbayan 2017

With the concurring themes of the previous Lakbayan, the events of 2017 were also brought by their calls to resume peace talks regarding the war between the Government of the Republic of the Philippines and the Communist Party of the Philippines, to denounce the excessive destruction of Marawi, and to end martial law in Mindanao. Their theme was "Lakbayan ng Bangsamoro at iba pang Pambansang Minorya: Ilantad at Labanan ang Pasistang Diktadurang US-Duterte" (Journey of the Bangsamoro and other National Minorities: Expose and Fight Against the US-Duterte Fascist Dictatorship).

Around 2,900 were welcomed within UP Diliman. This has been the third time the university hosted the minority groups. Some of the Lakbayanis were accommodated to a kampuhan inside the University of Santo Tomas from September 11 to 21.

== Attention and response ==
The Lakbayan helped capture the attention of the public and several government officials regarding the plight of indigenous peoples and other minority groups. Their call, with the hashtag #StopLumadKillings became a trending topic in Twitter in the Philippines during their stay. It has captured the attention of the AFP, saying they do not have their troops there and denied the killings, saying that it is their responsibility to protect the indigenous peoples from the New People's Army (NPA). In response, the indigenous peoples and their supporters have said that militarization of their communities have come from wanton resource extraction, similar to colonial times. It is through the establishment of the Citizen Armed Force Geographical Unit (CAFGU) under President Corazon Aquino that unleashed paramilitary forces for logging, mining, and agricultural companies.
