= 2016 U.S. Embassy protest in Manila =

2016 U.S. Embassy protest
- Part of Protests against Rodrigo Duterte
- Date: October 19, 2016
- Location: Roxas Boulevard (in front of the US Embassy), Ermita, Manila
- Caused by: Activism against United States military presence
- Methods: Demonstrations; rioting
- Result: Demonstrators violently dispersed, with some rammed by a police van

Parties
Philippine National Police; Manila Police District	SANDUGO; Lakbayan ng Pambansang Minorya para sa Sariling Pagpapasya at Makatarungang Kapayapaan; KABATAAN

Number
1,000	

Casualties and losses
60 injured	About 30 arrested

A protest that occurred in front of the U.S. embassy in Manila, Philippines led to a violent dispersal on October 19, 2016 when a police van accelerated back and forth, resulting in multiple injuries among protesters.

== Protest ==
A protest, led by national minority groups, namely SANDUGO and Lakbayan ng Pambansang Minorya para sa Sariling Pagpapasya at Makatarungang Kapayapaan, gathered in front of the U.S. embassy in Manila. The protest was to demand an end to the Oplan Bayanihan, a counterinsurgency campaign and the pulling out of troops and militias from indigenous people's communities. Bagong Alyansang Makabayan (BAYAN) secretary general Renato Reyes, Jr. said that the violent dispersal, which happened when the protest was about to conclude, was "planned and ordered" by a certain Col. Marcelino Pedroso. The protest turned violent when a police vehicle accelerating back-and-forth hit several protestors. The incident of ramming was recorded by the media. It occurred after the protestors surrounded the vehicle and began hitting it with wooden police batons. Among them were three activists, who were taken to the hospital. It was reported that the police arrested 21 individuals and brought them to the Manila Police District (MPD).

== Investigation ==
The SANDUGO and KABATAAN party-list stated that a certain Col. Marcelino Pedroso of the Manila Police District (MPD) allegedly gave the go-ahead for the violent dispersal of the protestors, while others claim that PO3 Franklin Koh — the driver of the police vehicle — ordered the violent dispersal. Pedroso, however, denied the ordering of the dispersal.

Cases filed against 10 policemen

- Multiple attempted murder
- Serious physical injuries
- Unlawful arrest
- Violation of R.A. 7438, B.P. 880
- Obstruction of justiceGrave misconduct
- Grave abuse of authority
- Conduct unbecoming of a public officer

On October 20, the Office of the Ombudsman charged 10 policemen after the protestors filed complaints against them related to the dispersal.

In October 29, it was reported that 28 police officers from the MPD filed counter-charges against the protesters for illegal assembly, direct assault on a person in authority, physical injury, resisting arrest and malicious mischief.

On July 2024, a warrant of arrest has been filed by the injured protesters against Franklin Koh for three counts of attempted homicide.
