= Philip Warren Gertsson =

Norwegian-Filipino football freestyler

Personal information
- Full name: Philip Warren Gertsson
- Nickname: PWG
- Born: July 24, 1991 (age 35)
- Website: www.philipfreestyle.com

Sport
- Country: Norway; Philippines
- Sport: Freestyle football

Philip Warren Gertsson is a Sweden-based Norwegian-Filipino football freestyler.

== Early life ==
Gertsson was born on July 24, 1991, to a Norwegian mother and a Filipino father. According to him, his parents first met in Oslo in the 1980s. He started playing freestyle football in 2006 at age 14.

== Career ==
Gertsson was the champion of the European Freestyle Football Championship in 2009 and the National Champion of Sweden in 2010. He finished 7th place at the 2014 Freestyle Football World Tour.

At the Asian Freestyle Football Championship, he first won the 2014 edition where he beat Iranian football freestyler, Mohammad Akbari in the final held in Hanoi, Vietnam. He failed to defend his title in Jakarta in the 2015 edition where he lost to Kosuke Takahashi of Japan in the final. He once again won the title in the 2016 edition which was hosted in Davao City, Philippines.

== Other ==
He also started a YouTube Channel on 15 February 2006 named PWGfreestyle, where he uploads vlogs and freestyle/football tricks.

Gertsson also works with Unisport, a website which sells football gear. He also started hosting and making tutorials on how to freestyle and play football on Unisport's YouTube channel along with Jay Mike and Joltter.
