= Alex Balcoba =

Filipino journalist

- Born: 1960 or 1961
- Died: May 27, 2016 (aged 55); Quiapo, Manila, Philippines
- Cause of death: Gun shot
- Occupation: Journalist
- Years active: 26 years
- Employer: People's Brigada Weekly
- Organization: Manila Police District Press Corp (Deputy Director)
- Known for: Reporting local crime
- Spouse: Florabella Balcoba
- Children: 1

Alex Balcoba Sr. (c. 1961 – May 27, 2016) was a Filipino crime journalist for Brigada Mass Media Corporation Weekly tabloid in Quiapo, Manila, Philippines, and was also known as the deputy director at the Manila Police District Press Corp. He was killed outside a watch repair shop that his family owns in Quiapo. He was one of the many journalist killed in the Philippines in 2016. The case gained international attention after Mayor Rodrigo Duterte was elected president.

== Personal life ==
Balcoba, a 55-year-old reporter, was born in the Philippines and was living in Quiapo, Manila with his wife, Florabella Balcoba who is a teacher. Alex and Florabella had owned a watch repair shop together with the help of their son. Balcoba's remains were cremated on May 29, 2016, in Caloocan.

== Career ==
Balcoba was a veteran reporter who worked to cover local news about crime and police brutality. He had been working as a journalist since the 1990s. Balcoba was also known for being the district deputy at the Manila police district, this is what helped get him into reporting the local crime for Brigada Mass Media Corporation. The Philippines is known for its forthright press and is one of the worst countries in terms of protection for journalists.

== Death ==
Manila in the Philippines

Balcoba was shot in the head by two armed gunmen outside his family's watch repair store in Quiapo, Manila around 7:00 on May 24, 2016. He was on the phone when the armed gunmen who were on a motorcycle drove by and shot while his friends and family were watching. A columnist says that others are suspecting that the gunman who shot Balcoba was a professional because it took him only one deadly shot to take out Balcoba. Several fellow journalist rushed Balcoba to the local hospital where he was pronounced dead. Balcoba's son told reporters that he had received numerous death threats due to his work in crime journalism, but they could not narrow it down because of the number of enemies he had. There were a few suspects questioned, but they had no luck. The investigation is still ongoing today with no leads on who the gunman was or who the gunman's companion was that had driven the getaway motorcycle. Police in Manila are working to look further into the different death threats that Balcoba had received.

== Context ==
Balcoba had been the second journalist to be killed in the Philippines in May 2016, and the 34th since 2010 when president Benigno Aquino III came to power. He is also the 174th journalist killed since a bloodless uprising ended the Ferdinand Marcos' dictatorship 30 years ago. Along with these, one of the world's deadliest attacks against journalists took place in the Philippines in 2009, when 32 journalists were among 58 people killed by a warlord clan that had the intent on stopping a rival's election challenge. It was reported that the killing of Balcoba happened one day after the Philippines Congress had officially dubbed Rodrigo Duterte the next president. The investigators were told that Balcoba was working on a current story when he was killed and has covered crime related stories since the 1990s, but the investigators are also looking for suspects who would target Balcoba's family business as well.

== Impact ==
Balcoba was a veteran journalist who had covered the local crime and police beat since the 1990s. He was also known for being a reporter for the People's Brigada and officer of the Manila Police District Press Corporation. He helped to bring justice for police who experienced brutality and helped to expose criminals. After the attack on Balcoba, it helped to get the public's attention on the problem at hand and take a stand to protect future journalist and reporters.

== Reactions ==
Mayor Rodrigo Duterte spoke out at a press conference after the killing of Alex Balcoba and made certain comments such as, "Most of you are clean, but do not ever say all journalists are clean," he said. "Just because you are a journalist, you are not exempt from assassination if you are a son of a bitch." As well as, "... Most of those killed, to be frank, have done something. You won't be killed if you don't do anything wrong."

Some people were outraged by this.

Reporter, Ryan Rosuaro spoke out against this and said, "It is appalling that President-elect Rodrigo Duterte should justify the murder of journalists in the country by playing the corruption card."

Executive director of the center for international law, Romel Regalado Bagares, said, "Duterte's comments showed "a cynical attitude towards what is a serious concern to the international community" and could perpetuate impunity for the killers."

International media monitor the Committee to Protect Journalists made a statement that wrote, "President-Elect Rodrigo Duterte's shocking remarks apparently excusing extrajudicial killings threaten to make the Philippines into a killing field for journalists, we strongly urge him to retract his comments and to signal that he intends to protect, not target the press."

Then finally, the Foreign Correspondent Association of the Philippines showed concern by stating, "Duterte's statement is a chilling reminder that journalists in the Philippines continue to live under threat, decades after (the association) was founded to fight for press freedom at the height of Ferdinand Marcos's dictatorship."

Balcoba's wife spoke up a few days later and replied to the Mayor's comments and standing up for her husband by making a few comments such as, "Sir, I am appealing to you. If I have to kneel, I will, just do not let this case drag on. I hope that once you assume office, you will prioritize this case so that the media killings, if not all the crimes in the country, will stop. You know, I really hope you could help me. I am drawing my strength from you, so that one day, I can finally get justice. I also hope the death penalty will be reimposed so that the killers of my husband will be punished with it."

== See also ==
- List of journalists killed under the Arroyo administration
