= 2020 PSA Annual Awards =

Annual awarding ceremony

- Date: March 6, 2020
- Location: Centennial Hall, Manila Hotel, Manila
- Country: Philippines
- Hosted by: Sev Sarmenta; Rizza Diaz; Gerry Ramos; Abac Cordero; Waylon Galvez

Television/radio coverage
- Network: One Sports (TV); Radyo Pilipinas 2 (Radio)

The 2020 San Miguel Corporation (SMC) - Philippine Sportswriters Association (PSA) Annual Awards was an annual awarding ceremony honoring the individuals (athletes and officials) and organizations that made a significant impact on Philippine sports in 2019, which was led by the medalists of the 2019 Southeast Asian Games hosted by the country.

The event is organized by the Philippine Sportswriters Association under the leadership of Eriberto "Tito" S. Talao (sports editor of the Manila Bulletin). The PSA is the oldest Philippine-based media organization, which is founded in 1949, and made up of veteran and seasoned sports scribes, section editors and columnists from print media (broadsheets and tabloids), sports news websites and social media platforms.

Among the awards set to be received this year are the Athlete of the Year (Team Philippines), Lifetime Achievement Award (Efren "Bata" Reyes), President's Award (Carlos Yulo), Executive of the Year (William "Butch" Ramirez), Mr. Basketball (Thirdy Ravena), Ms. Volleyball (Sisi Rondina), Mr. Volleyball (Bryan Bagunas), Mr. Football (Stephan Schröck), Ms. Golf (Bianca Pagdanganan), National Sports Association of the Year (Association of Boxing Alliances in the Philippines), Major Awards, Minor Citations, Tony Siddayao Awards for Under 17 Athletes, Posthumous Recognition, Milo Junior Athletes of the Year, and the Chooks-To-Go Fan Favorite Award.

There will be a new set of awards including the Ms. Basketball (Jack Danielle Aninam) and Coach of the Year (Patrick Aquino) which will be handed out starting this year.

Three-time PSA Athlete of the Year (1999, 2001 and 2006) awardee and Philippine billiards legend Efren "Bata" Reyes, who will also set to receive the Lifetime Achievement Award served as the guest speaker.

Top sports officials led by PSC Chairman and Executive of the Year awardee William "Butch" Ramirez, International Olympic Committee (IOC) representative to the Philippines Mikee Cojuangco-Jaworski, House Speaker and Philippine SEA Games Organizing Committee Chairman Alan Peter Cayetano, Deputy House Speaker Mikee Romero, and POC President Abraham "Bambol" Tolentino are expected to attend the occasion.

The awards night was held on March 6, 2020, at the Centennial Hall of the Manila Hotel in Manila.

== Honor roll ==
=== Main awards ===
The following are the list of main awards of the event.

==== Athletes of the Year ====
For claiming their second overall championship in the 2019 Southeast Asian Games hosted in the country, the PSA bestowed the Athlete of the Year honors to the Philippine National Team participated in the biennial meet. This is the second time that the National Team won the Athlete of the Year award. They were recognized with the same honors in the 2006 PSA Annual Awards after securing the championship title of the 2005 SEA Games, also held in the Philippines.

The Philippine delegation, which composed of 1,115 national athletes, took home a total of 387 medals (149 golds, 117 silvers, and 121 bronzes; hitting a new record high for most number of medals since the Philippines joined the SEA Games in 1977) from the 11-nation regional sporting meet held from November 30 to December 11 at four major clusters, Clark, Subic, Metro Manila and Other Areas (Calabarzon-La Union).

Award	Winner	Sport/Team/Recognition	References
Athletes of the Year	Team Philippines at the 2019 Southeast Asian Games	Various Sports (2019 Southeast Asian Games Overall Champions)	

==== Other major awards ====
Here are the other major awards to be conferred in the Awards Night.

Award	Winner	Sport/Team/Recognition	References
Lifetime Achievement Award	Efren "Bata" Reyes	Billiards (2019 Southeast Asian Games Bronze Medalist, Men's Carom and Philippine Billiards Legend and Hall-of-Famer)	
President's Award	Carlos Edriel "Caloy" Yulo	Gymnastics (2019 World Artistic Gymnastics Championships Gold Medalist, Men's Floor Exercise; Second Pinoy athlete to qualify in the 2020 Tokyo Summer Olympics; 2019 Southeast Asian Games Gold (2) and Silver (5) Medalist, Men's Artistic Gymnastics)	
Executive of the Year	William "Butch" Ramirez	Philippine Sports (Philippine Sports Commission Chairman; Team Philippines at the 2019 Southeast Asian Games Chef-de-Mission)	
National Sports Association of the Year	Association of Boxing Alliances in the Philippines (ABAP)	Boxing (2019 Southeast Asian Games - 7 Golds, 3 Silvers, 2 Bronzes / Nesthy Petecio - AIBA Women's World Boxing Championships Gold Medalist / Eumir Felix Marcial - AIBA Women's World Boxing Championships Silver Medalist / Josie Gabuco - ASBC Elite Boxing Championships Gold Medalist)	
Mr. Basketball	Thirdy Ravena	Basketball (Ateneo Blue Eagles Point Guard and UAAP Season 82 Men's Basketball Champion and Finals MVP / Gilas Pilipinas Pool Member, 2019 FIBA World Cup Asian Qualifiers)	
Ms. Basketball	Jack Danielle Animam	Basketball (National University Lady Bulldogs Center - UAAP Season 82 Women's Basketball Champions / Double Gold Medalist, Women's 5x5 and 3x3 Basketball of the 2019 Southeast Asian Games)	
Coach of the Year	Patrick Aquino	Basketball (National University Lady Bulldogs and Gilas Pilipinas Women Head Coach)	
Ms. Volleyball	Cherry Ann "Sisi" Rondina	Volleyball (UST Tigresses/Petron Blaze Spikers/Philippine Women's National Beach Volleyball Team - UAAP Season 81 Beach & Indoor Women's Volleyball MVP and bronze medalist, Women's Beach Volleyball - 2019 Southeast Asian Games)	
Mr. Volleyball	Bryan Bagunas	Volleyball (NU Bulldogs/Cignal HD Spikers/Oita Miyoshi Weisse Adler/Philippines men's national volleyball team - UAAP Season 81 Indoor Men's Volleyball MVP and silver medalist, Men's Indoor Volleyball - 2019 Southeast Asian Games)	
Mr. Football	Stephan Schröck	Football (Philippines national football team/Ceres–Negros F.C. Team Captain and Midfielder / 2020 AFF Best XI Awardee)	
Ms. Golf	Bianca Pagdanganan	Golf (University of Arizona/Philippine National Golf Team/LPGA Professional Player / 2019 Southeast Asian Games, Gold Medalist, Women's Individual and Women's Team)	
Chooks-to-Go Fan Favorite "Manok ng Bayan" Award	Philippines men's national 3x3 team (Joshua Munzo) and Alvin Pasaol)	Basketball (Qualified for the 2020 FIBA Olympic Qualifying Tournament)	

=== Major awardees ===
Sorted in alphabetical order (based on their surnames).

Winner	Sport/Team/Recognition	References
Jerwin Ancajas	Professional Boxing (IBF World Super Flyweight Champion)	
Aidric Jose Chan	Amateur Golf (2019 Junior World Golf Championships Champion)	
Johnriel Casimero	Professional Boxing (WBA World Bantamweight Champion)	
Hidilyn Diaz	Weightlifting (2019 Southeast Asian Games Gold Medalist, Women's 55 kg)	
June Mar Fajardo	Professional Basketball (2017–18 PBA season Most Valuable Player / 2019 Southeast Asian Games Gold Medalist, Men's 5x5 Basketball)	
National University Lady Bulldogs	Collegiate Basketball (UAAP Season 82 Women's Basketball Champions)	
Ernest Obiena	Athletics - Pole Vault (2019 Southeast Asian Games Gold Medalist, Men's Pole Vault)	
Juvic Pagunsan	Professional Golf (2019 ICTSI Riviera Golf Challenge Champion)	
Nesthy Petecio	Amateur Boxing (2019 AIBA Women's World Boxing Championships Gold Medalist, Women's Featherweight (57 kg)/2019 Southeast Asian Games Gold Medalist, Women's Featherweight)	
San Miguel Beermen	Professional Basketball (2019 PBA Philippine Cup and 2019 PBA Commissioner's Cup Titlists)	
Princess Mary Superal	Professional Golf (2019 ICTSI Camp John Hay Ladies Championship Champion)	
Union Bell; Owner: Bell Racing Stable - Elmer De Leon; Trainer: Donnie S. Sordan; Jockey: Jonathan B. Hernandez	Horse Racing - Horse of the Year (2019 Philippine Racing Commission (PHILRACOM) Juvenile Championship Winner)	

=== Citations ===
==== 2019 SEA Games Gold Medalists ====
All 149 gold medalists including those who won more than two or three golds in the Southeast Asian Games will get to receive the special citation from the PSA.

Aquatics – Swimming:

- James Deiparine – Men's 100M Breaststroke

Archery:

- Paul Marton dela Cruz & Rachelle Anne Dela Cruz – Mixed Team Compound

Arnis:

- Abegail Abad – Women's Paddled Stick Welterweight +65 kg
- Mike Bañares – Men's Live Stick Welterweight +65 kg
- Dexter Bolambao – Men's Live Stick Bantamweight -55 kg
- Villardo Canumay – Men's Live Stick Lightweight -60-65 kg
- Crisamuel Delfin – Men's Anyo Open Weapon Non-Traditional
- Mary Allin Aldeguer – Women's Anyo Open Weapon Non-Traditional
- Sheena del Monte – Women's Paddled Stick Women's Bantamweight -50 kg
- Jesfer Huquire – Men's Paddled Stick Bantamweight -55 kg
- Elmer Manlapas – Men's Paddled Stick Featherweight -55-60 kg
- Ros Ashley Monville – Women's Paddled Stick Lightweight -55-60 kg
- Jezebel Morcillo – Women's Live Stick Bantamweight -50 kg
- Jedah Mae Soriano – Women's Paddled Stick Featherweight -50-55 kg
- Carloyd Tejada – Men's Paddled Stick Men's Welterweight +65 kg
- Niño Mark Tolledo – Men's Livestick Featherweight -55-60 kg

Athletics:

- Clinton Kingsley Bautista – Men's 110M Hurdles
- Melvin Calano – Men's Javelin Throw
- Eric Shauwn Cray – Men's 400M Hurdles
- Sarah Dequilan – Women's Heptathlon
- Christine Hallasgo – Women's Marathon
- Eloiza Luzon, Anfernee Lopena, Kristina Marie Knott, Eric Shauwn Cray – Mixed 4×100M Relay
- Kristina Marie Knott – Women's 200M
- William Morrison III – Men's Shot Put
- Ernest John Obiena – Men's Pole Vault
- Aries Toledo – Men's Decathlon
- Natalie Uy – Women's Pole Vault

Baseball:

- Team Pilipinas – Dino Emiglio Altomonte, Adriane Ros Bernardo, Erwin Bosito, Clarence Lyle Caasalan, Bryan Victrix Castillo, Alfredo de Guzman III, Junmar Diarao, Vladimir Eguia, Ignacio Luis Escano, Francis Michael Gesmundo, Arvin Maynard Herrera, Jarus Inobio, Romeo Jasmin Jr., Ferdinand Liguayan Jr., Juan Diego Lozano, Juan Alvaro Macasaet, Juan Paolo Macasaet, Mark Steven Manaig, Jennald Pareja, Jonash Ponce, Jon Jon Robles, Miguel Jose Salud, Kyle Rodrigo Villafaña Jr., Jerome Yenson – Men's

Basketball – 3×3:

- Gilas Pilipinas Men – CJ Perez, Jason Perkins, Moala Tautuaa, Chris Elijah Newsome – Men's
- Gilas Pilipinas Women – Jack Danielle Animam, Afril Bernardino, Clare Castro, Janine Pontejos – Women's

Basketball – 5×5:

- Gilas Pilipinas Men – Japeth Aguilar, June Mar Fajardo, Marcio Lassiter, Vic Manuel, Stanley Pringle, Kiefer Ravena, Troy Rosario, Chris Ross, Greg Slaughter, Christian Standhardinger, LA Tenorio, Matthew Wright – Men's
- Gilas Pilipinas Women – Jack Danielle Animam, Afril Bernardino, France Mae Cabinbin, Ana Alicia Katrina Castillo, Clare Castro, Eunique Chan, Kelli Casey Hayes, Danica Therese Jose, Ria Joy Nabalan, Janine Pontejos, Nathalia Prado, Marizze Andrea Tongco – Women's

Billiards:

- Rubilen Amit – Women's 9-Ball Pool Singles
- Rubilen Amit/Cheska Centeno – Women's 9-Ball Pool Doubles
- Cheska Centeno – Women's 10-Ball Pool Singles
- Dennis Orcollo – Men's 10-Ball Pool Singles

Boxing:

- Josie Gabuco – Women's Light Flyweight 48 kg
- Rogen Ladon – Men's Flyweight 52 kg
- Eumir Felix Marcial – Men's Middleweight 75 kg
- Carlo Paalam – Men's Light Flyweight 46–49 kg
- James Palicte – Men's Light Welterweight 64 kg
- Nesthy Petecio – Women's Featherweight 57 kg
- Charly Suarez – Men's Lightweight 60 kg

Canoe/Kayak:

- Hermie Macaranas – Men's 100M Singles

Cycling:

- Lea Denise Belgira – Women's Mountain Bike Downhill
- John Derick Farr – Men's Mountain Bike Downhill
- Jermyn Prado – Women's Road Event Individual Time Trial

Dancesport:

- Sean Mischa Aranar/Ana Leonila Nualla (3) – Standard All Five Dances/Tango/Vienniese Waltz
- Wilbert Aunzo/Pearl Marie Cañeda (3) – Latin Samba/Chachacha/Rumba
- Mark Jayson Gayon/Mary Joy Renigen (2) – Standard Waltz/Foxtrot
- Michael Angelo Marquez/Stephanie Sabalo (2) – Latin All Five Dances/Pasodoble

Duathlon:

- Monica Torres – Women's Individual

eSports:

- Team Sibol – Bryle Jacob “cml” Alvizo, James Erice “Erice” Guerra, Jun “Bok” Kanehara, Van Jerico “Van” Manalaysay, Marvin “Boomy” Rushton, John Anthony “Natsumi” Vargas, Mc Nicholson “Mac” Villanueva – DotA 2
- Team Sibol – Jeniel “Haze” Bata-Anon, Angelo Kyle “Pheww” Arcangel, Allan Sancio “Lusty” Castromayor, Karl Gabriel “KarlTzy” Nepomuceno, Kenneth Jiane “Kenji” Villa, Carlito “Ribo” Ribo Jr., Jason Rafael “Jay” Torculas – Mobile Legends: Bang Bang
- Caviar “Enderr” Acampado – StarCraft II

Fencing:

- Hanniel Abella, Mickyle Rein Bustos, Anna Gabriella Estimada, Harlene Raguin – Women's Team Épée
- Jylyn Nicanor – Women's Individual Sabre

Golf:

- Bianca Pagdanganan – Women's Individual Match Play
- Lois Kaye Go, Bianca Pagdanganan, Abby Arevalo – Women's Team

Gymnastics – Artistic:

- Carlos Edriel Yulo (2) – Men's All-Around/Floor Exercise

Gymnastics – Rhythmic:

- Daniela Reggie dela Pisa – Women's Hoop

Jiujitsu:

- Adrian Rodolfo Erwin Guggenheim – Men's -77 kg
- Meggie Ochoa – Women's -45 kg
- Carlo Angelo Peña – Men's -56 kg
- Annie Ramirez – Women's -55 kg
- Dean Michael Roxas – Men's -85 kg

Judo:

- Mariya Takahashi – Women's -73 kg
- Kiyomi Watanabe – Women's -63 kg

Karatedo:

- Jamie Lim – Women's Individual Kumite +61 kg
- Junna Tsukii – Women's Individual Kumite -50 kg

Kickboxing:

- Gina Iniong – Women's Kick Light -55 kg
- Jerry Olsim – Men's Kick Light -69 kg
- Jean Claude Saclag – Men's Low Kick -63.5 kg

Kurash:

- Estie Gay Liwanen – Women's -63 kg

Lawn Bowls:

- Rodel Labayo – Men's Pairs
- Angelo Morales – Men's Pairs

Modern Pentathlon:

- Michael Ver Anton Comaling – Men's Beach Triathle Individual
- Princess Honey Arbilon, Samuel German – Beach Laser Mixed Relay

Muay:

- Jearome Calica, Joemar Gallaza – Men's Waikru Mai Muaythai
- Phillip Delarmino – Men's 57 kg
- Ariel Lim Lampacan – Men's 54 kg

Obstacle Course Race:

- Sandi Abahan – Women's Individual 5k x 20
- Diana Buhler, Jeffrey Reginio, Klymille Keilah Rodriguez, Nathaniel Sanchez – Mixed Team Relay 400M x 12 Obstacle
- Melvin Guarte – Men's Individual 5k x 20
- Kyle Redentor Antolin, Kaizen dela Serna, Monolito Divina, Deanne Nicole Moncada – Mixed Team Assist 400M x 12 Obstacle
- Jeffrey Kevin Pascua – Men's Individual 100M x 10 Obstacle
- Rochelle Suarez – Women's Individual 100M x 10 Obstacle

Pencak Silat:

- Edmar Taquel – Men's Seni Tunggal

Rowing:

- Cris Nievarez – Men's Lightweight Single Sculls
- Melcah Jen Caballero – Women's Lightweight Single Sculls

Rugby:

- Philippine Volcanoes – Timothy Alfonso, Vincent Amar, Donald Canon, Harry Dionson, Tommy Kalaw, Robert Luceno, Patrice Ortiz, Joe Palabay, Ned Plarizan, Ryan Reyes, Luc Villalba, Justin Villazor – Men's Rugby 7s

Sailing:

- Lester Troy Tayong, Emerson Villena – Men's International 470
- Team Pilipinas – Ridgely Balladares, Rubin Cruz Jr., Whok Dimapilis, Richly Magsanay, Joel Mejarito, Edgar Villapaña (2) – Keelboat Fleet Racing/Keelboat Match Racing

Sambo:

- Chino Sy Tancontian – Men's Sport -74 kg
- Mark Striegl – Men's Contact -74 kg

Sepaktakraw:

- Team Pilipinas – Metodio Suico Jr, Jason Huerte, John Bobier, Emmanuel Escote, John Jeffrey Morcillos – Men's Hoop
- Team Pilipinas – Deseree Autor, Josefina Maat, Sarah Kalalo, Jean Marie Sucalit, Mary Ann Lopez – Women's Hoop

Shooting:

- Eric Ang, Carlos Conge Carag, Hagen Alexander Topacio – Men's Trap Team
- Elvie Baldivino, Marly Martir, Franchette Shayne Quiroz – Women's WA 1500 PPC Team
- Marly Martir – Women's WA 1500 Precision Pistol Competition (PPC) Individual

Skateboarding:

- Jaime de Lange – Men's Downhill
- Margielyn Didal (2) – Women's Game of S.K.A.T.E./Street
- Jericho Jojit Francisco Jr. – Men's Park
- Daniel Ledermann – Men's Game of S.K.A.T.E.
- Christiana Means – Women's Park

Soft Tennis:

- Team Pilipinas – Mark Alcoseba, Joseph Arcilla, Noel Damian Jr., Kevin Mamawal, Mikoff Manduriao, Dheo Talatayod – Men's Team
- Noelle Conchita Corazon Zoleta-Manalac – Women's Individual Singles
- Noelle Conchita Corazon Zoleta-Manalac, Noelle Nikki Camille Zoleta – Women's Doubles

Softball:

- RP Blu Girls – Francesca Altomonte, Mary Ann Antolihao, Riflayca Basa, Garnet Agnes Blando, Khrisha Genuary Cantor, Shaira Damasing, Elsie Dela Torre, Ma. Angelu Gabriel, Kaith Ezra Jalandoni, Mary Joy Maguad, Mary Nicole Pasadas, Ma. Celestine Palma, Royevel Palma, Cristy Joy Roa, Jenette Rusia, Angelie Ursabia, Arianne Vallestero – Women's

Squash:

- Kayod Pilipinas – Jemyca Aribado, Yvonne Alyssa Dalida, Reymark Begornia, Robert Andrew Garcia, David William Pelino – Mixed Team

Surfing:

- Nilbie Blancada – Women's Longboard Open
- Roger Casogay – Men's Longboard Open

Taekwondo – Kyorugi:

- Kurt Bryan Barbosa – Men's Finweight -54 kg
- Dave Cea – Men's Lightweight -74 kg
- Pauline Lopez – Women's Featherweight -57 kg
- Samuel Morrison – Men's Welterweight -80 kg

Taekwondo – Poomsae:

- Jeordan Dominguez – Men's Freestyle Individual
- Jocel Lyn Ninobla – Women's Recognized Individual
- Dustin Jacob Mella, Raphael Enrico Mella, Rodolfo Reyes Jr. – Men's Recognized Team
- Rodolfo Reyes Jr. – Men's Recognized Individual

Tennis:

- Francis Alcantara, Jeson Patrombon – Men's Doubles

Triathlon:

- John Chicano – Men's Individual
- Kim Mangrobang – Women's Individual
- Kim Mangrobang, Fernando Casares, Claire Adorna, John Chicano – Mixed Relay

Wakeboarding and Waterski:

- Susan Larsson – Women's Wakeskate
- Jhondi Wallace – Men's Wakeskate

Weightlifting:

- Hidilyn Diaz – Women's 55 kg
- Kristel Macrohon – Women's 71 kg

Windsurfing:

- Geylord Coveta – Men's RS: One
- Yancy Kaibigan – Men's RS: X (9.5M)

Wrestling:

- Jason Baucas – Men's Greco Roman 72 kg
- Noel Norada – Men's Greco Roman 63 kg

Wushu:

- Jessie Aligaga – Men's Sanda 48 kg
- Arnel Mandal – Men's Sanda 52 kg
- Francisco Solis – Men's Sanda 56 kg
- Clemente Tabugara – Men's Sanda 65 kg
- Divine Wally – Women's Sanda 48 kg
- Agatha Wong (2) – Women's Taolu Taijiquan/Taijijian

==== Other recipients ====
Sorted in alphabetical order (based on their surnames).

Winner	Sport/Team/Recognition	References
Amelie Hotel Manila	Official Venue of the Philippine Sportswriters Association Forum	
Ateneo Blue Eagles	Collegiate Basketball (UAAP Season 82 Men's Basketball Champions)	
Samantha Kyle Catantan	Fencing (2019 Asian Under 23 Championships Gold Medalist & 2019 Southeast Asian Games Bronze Medalist, Women's Individual Foil/UAAP Season 82 Girls' Fencing MVP)	
Josie Gabuco	Amateur Boxing (2019 ASBC Asian Boxing Championships and 2019 Southeast Asian Games Gold Medalist, Women's Light Flyweight 48 kg)	
Go For Gold - Jeremy Go	Supporter of Philippine Sports	
GM John Paul Gomez	Chess (2019 Pattaya Chess Club Open 2019 Champion, Open Category)	
Lourence Ilagan	Darts (2019 PDC Asian Tour Leg 7 Taipei Winner)	
Letran Knights	Collegiate Basketball (NCAA Season 95 Men's Basketball Champions)	
Eumir Felix Marcial	Amateur Boxing (2019 AIBA World Boxing Championships Silver Medalist and 2019 Southeast Asian Games Gold Medalist, Men's Middleweight 75 kg)	
Mighty Sports	Basketball (2019 William Jones Cup Champions)	
MVP Sports Foundation - Manny V. Pangilinan	Supporter of Philippine Sports	
Joshua Pacio	Mixed Martial Arts (ONE Championship Strawweight World Champion)	
Pilipinas Obstacle Sports Federation	Obstacle racing (2019 Southeast Asian Games: 6 Golds, 3 Silvers, 1 Bronze)	
Estefano Rivera	Motorsport (2019 Giti Formula V1 Challenge Overall Champion)	
Mikee Romero	Polo (One Patriotic Coalition of Marginalized Nationals (1-PACMAN) Partylist Representative/2019 Southeast Asian Games Bronze Medalist, 0-2 Goals)	
Standard Insurance - Ernesto Echauz	Supporter of Philippine Sports	
Merwin Tan	Bowling (20th Asian Youth Tenpin Bowling Championships Gold Medalist, Boys Singles)	
Pedro Taduran	Professional Boxing (IBF World Minimumweight Champion)	

=== Milo Junior Athletes of the Year ===
The award, sponsored by Milo, will be given to the two young athletes who are excelled in the field of sports.

Award	Winner	Sport/Team/Recognition	References
Milo Junior Female Athletes of the Year	Daniela Reggie dela Pisa	Gymnastics (Rhythmic) (2019 Southeast Asian Games Gold Medalist, Women's Hoop)	
Milo Junior Female Athletes of the Year	Alex Eala	Tennis (World #4 and 2020 Australian Open Girls' Doubles Champion)	
Milo Junior Male Athletes of the Year	Miguel Barreto	Swimming (2019 Palarong Pambansa Most Bemedalled Swimmer, 7 Gold Medals for National Capital Region)	
Milo Junior Male Athletes of the Year	IM Daniel Quizon	Chess (2020 Eastern Asia Youth Chess Championships Gold Medalist, Boys Under 16 Standard Chess)	

=== Tony Siddayao Awards for Under-17 Athletes ===
The award, which is named after Tony Siddayao (deceased, former sports editor of Manila Standard) is given out to outstanding junior athletes. Sorted in alphabetical order (based on their surnames).

Winner	Sport/Team/Recognition	References
Celine Abalos	Golf (2019 USKids Golf European Championship 2nd Place)	
Jordan Dinham	Bowling (Philippine International Open Tenpin Bowling Championships 2019 Youth Boys Masters Winner)	
Marc Bryan Dula	Swimming (Swimming PINAS Bemedalled Swimmer; 2019 Batang Pinoy National Finals Gold Medalist)	
Alex Eala	Tennis (World #4 and 2020 Australian Open Girls' Doubles Champion)	
Miko Eala	Tennis (2019 Hellenic Bank Masters Tennis Academy Tournament Champion)	
Juan Miguel Sebastian Jadie	Karatedo (31st Busan Mayor’s Cup and 12th Korean International Karatedo Open Gold Medalist, Kata 11 years old and below)	
Dale Lazo	Bowling (Philippine International Open Tenpin Bowling Championships 2019 Youth Girls Masters Winner)	
Micaela Jasmine Mojdeh	Swimming (Swimming PINAS Bemedalled Swimmer; 2019 Beijing All-Star Swimming Championships Gold Medalist)	
FIDE Master Antonella Berthe Racasa	Chess (Pattaya Chess Club Open 2019 Age Group Chess Championship Girls Under-12 Titlist)	
Jessa Mae Tabuan	Powerlifting (2019 World Junior & Sub-Junior Powerlifting Championships Gold and Bronze (3) Medalist, Female Sub-Junior -47 Kg))	

=== Posthumous Awards for Deceased Sports Personalities ===
The following awards, will be bestowed upon former national & collegiate athletes, officials and sports personalities who died in 2019. They will be honored with a short audio-video presentation and a one-minute moment of silence.

Winner	Sport/Team/Recognition	Date of death	References
Miguel Bonalos	Basketball (Player, San Sebastian Golden Staglets)	June 30	
Angelo Constantino	Bowling (1992 Bowling World Youth Championship Gold Medalist and Former National Team Coach)	January 11	
Amber Garcia Torres	Motorcycle racing (2019 Yamaha Sniper 150 National Championship Champion)	December 6	
John Gokongwei	Basketball (Former Team Owner, Presto, N-Rich, Great Taste, and Tivoli Franchise (Philippine Basketball Association))	November 9	
Mark Joseph	Swimming (Former National Swimmer/Former President, Philippine Swimming, Inc.)	March 7	
Nes Pamilar	Volleyball (Former Head Coach, FEU Lady Tamaraws/Cagayan Valley Lady Rising Suns)	January 12	
Susan Papa	Swimming (Former National Swimmer/President and Head Coach, Philippine Swimming League)	May 19	
Claro Pellosis	Athletics (1962 Asian Games Gold Medalist, Men's 4×100 meters relay and Coach of Lydia de Vega))	July 21	
Raphael Poliquit	Athletics (42nd National Milo Marathon Finals Men's Champion)	April 11	
Florendo Ritualo Sr.	Basketball (Pioneering Player of Presto/Great Taste (Philippine Basketball Association))	January 2	
Sheryl Sanchez Reyes	Basketball (Player Agent of Philippine Basketball Association-bound Imports)	May 11	
Reggie Santos	Basketball (Former Point Guard, San Sebastian Stags)	February 10	
Lucio "Bong" Tan Jr.	Basketball (Former Team Owner, Tanduay Rhum Masters (Philippine Basketball Association))	November 11	
Emmanuel Tangkion	Basketball (Veteran Referee, Philippine Basketball Association)	April 10	
Vic Vic Villavicencio	Basketball (Chairman, Kamayan Chain of Restaurants/Former Team Owner, Triple V (Philippine Basketball League))	April 29	

== See also ==
- 2019 in Philippine sports
- 37th SMB-SAC Cebu Sports Awards
