= 37th SAC-SMB Cebu Sports Awards =

Annual awarding ceremony

- Date: February 29, 2020
- Location: Northwing, SM City Cebu, Cebu City
- Country: Philippines

The 37th Sportswriters Association of Cebu (SAC) - San Miguel Beer (SMB) Cebu Sports Awards is an annual awarding ceremony that recognized the triumphs and accomplishments of Cebuano sports personalities (athletes, coaches, teams and entities) in the past year, spearheaded by the medalists of the 2019 Southeast Asian Games hosted by the Philippines. The Cebu Sports Awards is the local counterpart of the yearly Philippine Sportswriters Association Annual Awards Night.

The awarding rites is organized by the Sportswriters Association of Cebu, an organization led by sportswriters and sports columnists from newspapers and online portals based in Cebu such as Sun.Star Cebu, The Freeman and Cebu Daily News Digital.

The event will take place on February 29, 2020, at the Northwing of the SM City Cebu in Cebu City.

== Honor roll ==
=== Athlete of the Year ===
2018 Asian Games and 2019 Southeast Asian Games Gold Medalist Margielyn Didal was chosen by Cebu-based sportswriter as the Athlete of the Year, which was announced during the awarding ceremony.

Winner	Sport	Recognition	References
Margielyn Didal	Skateboarding	2019 Southeast Asian Games Gold Medalist, Women's Street and Women's Game of S.K.A.T.E.	

=== Major awardees ===
The selection of the major awardees is based on their top achievements in the past year.

Sport	Winner	Recognition	References
Archery	Aldrener Ygot Jr.	2019 Batang Pinoy National Finals Gold (8) Medalist, Boy's Archery	
Arnis	Dexter Bolambao	2019 Southeast Asian Games Gold Medalist, Men's Bantamweight Full Contact Live Stick Bantamweight	
Athletics (Marathon)	Mary Joy Tabal	2019 Southeast Asian Games Silver Medalist, Women's Marathon	
Athletics (Pole Vault)	Nathalie Uy	2019 Southeast Asian Games Gold Medalist, Women's Pole Vault	
Basketball	June Mar Fajardo	2019 Southeast Asian Games Gold Medalist, Men's Basketball (Gilas Pilipinas) / 2019 Philippine Basketball Association Season MVP	
Basketball	Greg Slaughter	2019 Southeast Asian Games Gold Medalist, Men's Basketball (Gilas Piipinas)	
Billiards	Rubilen Amit	2019 Southeast Asian Games Gold Medalist, Women's 9-Ball	
Bowling	Marie Alexis Sy	2019 Southeast Asian Games Bronze Medalist, Women's Team of 4	
Boxing	Johnriel Casimero	WBO World Bantamweight Champion	
Chess	Jerish John Velarde	2020 National Age Group Chess Championships Visayas Leg Under 14 Champion	
Cycling (Mountain biking)	Niño Surban	2019 Southeast Asian Games Gold Medalist, Men's Olympic Cross-Country	
Dancesport (Latin)	Wilbert Aunzo and Pearl Marie Cañeda	2019 Southeast Asian Games Gold Medalist, Chachacha, Rumba and Samba	
Dragon boat	PADS Adaptive Dragonboat Team	2019 IDBF World Dragon Boat Racing Championships Gold Medalists, 200M and 500M Small Boat Paradragon Division 1 Open and 200M and 500M Small Boat Paradragon Division 2 Open	
Esports	Team Adroit DOTA - Sibol (Marvin Rushton, John Anthony Vargas, Bryle Jacob Alvizo, Jun Kanehara, MC Nicholson Villanueva, Coach Paolo Bago)	2019 Southeast Asian Games Gold Medalists, Dota 2	
Golf	Lois Kaye Go	2019 Southeast Asian Games Gold Medalist, Women's Team Golf	
Gymnastics (Rhythmic)	Daniela Reggie dela Pisa	2019 Southeast Asian Games Gold Medalist, Hoop/Bronze Medalist, Ball and Clubs	
Judo	Kiyomi Watanabe	2019 Southeast Asian Games Gold Medalist, Women's -63 kg	
Karate	Sarah Pangilinan	2019 Southeast Asian Games Gold Medalist, Women's Individual Kata	
Karting	William Go	2019 IAME Series Asia Overall Cadet Champion	
Motorsports	Team Toyota Cebu	2019 Vios Racing Festival Top Winners	
Motorsports	Daniel Miranda	2019 TCR Asia International Series Best Asian Driver	
Obstacle Course Racing	Sherwin Managil	2019 Southeast Asian Games Silver Medalist, Men's Individual 5K x 20 Obstacle	
Rugby 7s	Auimi Ono	2019 Southeast Asian Games Gold Medalist, Women's Rugby 7s (Philippine Volcanoes)	
Sepak takraw	Metodio Suico Jr.	2019 Southeast Asian Games Gold Medalist, Men's Hoop	
Sepak takraw	Jean Marie Sucalit	2019 Southeast Asian Games Gold Medalist, Women's Hoop/Bronze Medalist, Women's Regu	
Shooting	Ditto Nestor Dinopol	2019 Southeast Asian Games Silver Medalist, Mixed Benchrest Air Rifle (Heavy Varmint)	
Shooting	Diogenes Avila	2019 Southeast Asian Games Bronze Medalist, Mixed Metallic Silhouette Air Rifle	
Skateboarding	Margielyn Didal	2019 Southeast Asian Games Gold Medalist, Women's Street and Women's Game of S.K.A.T.E.	
Skateboarding	Daniel Ledermann	2019 Southeast Asian Games Gold Medalist, Men's Game of S.K.A.T.E.	
Softball	Mary Ann Antolihao	2019 Southeast Asian Games Gold Medalist, Women's Softball (RP Blu Girls)	
Swimming	James Deiparine	2019 Southeast Asian Games Gold Medalist, Men's 100M Breaststroke/Silver Medalist, Men's 50M Breastroke	
Table Tennis	Richard Gonzales	2019 Southeast Asian Games Bronze Medalist, Men's Singles	
Taekwondo (Poomsae)	Rinna Babanto	2019 Southeast Asian Games Silver Medalist, Recognized Mixed Pair & Recognized Women's Team/2019 Chuncheon Korea Open Gold Medalist, Recognized Women's Team	
Taekwondo (Poomsae)	Aidaine Krisha Laxa	2019 Southeast Asian Games Silver Medalist, Recognized Women's Team//2019 Chuncheon Korea Open Gold Medalist, Recognized Women's Team	
Triathlon	Andrew Kim Remolino	2019 Southeast Asian Games Silver Medalist, Men's Individual	
Volleyball	Sisi Rondina	2019 Southeast Asian Games Bronze Medalist, Women's Beach Volleyball/UAAP Season 81 Beach & Indoor Volleyball MVP	
Wakeboarding	Raphael Trinidad	10th IWWF Cable Wakeboard & Wakeskate World Championships Silver Medalist, Men's Cable Wakeboarding/2019 Southeast Asian Games Silver Medalist, Men's Wakeboard	
Weightlifting	Elreen Ando	2019 Southeast Asian Games Silver Medalist, Women's 64 kg	
Weightlifting	John Febuar Ceniza	2019 Southeast Asian Games Silver Medalist, Men's 55 kg	

== See also ==
- 2019 in Philippine sports
- 2020 PSA Annual Awards
- Philippines at the 2019 Southeast Asian Games
