= Davao City–UP Sports Complex =

Sports complex in Davao City, Philippines

- Davao Sports Complex; UP–Davao City Sports Complex
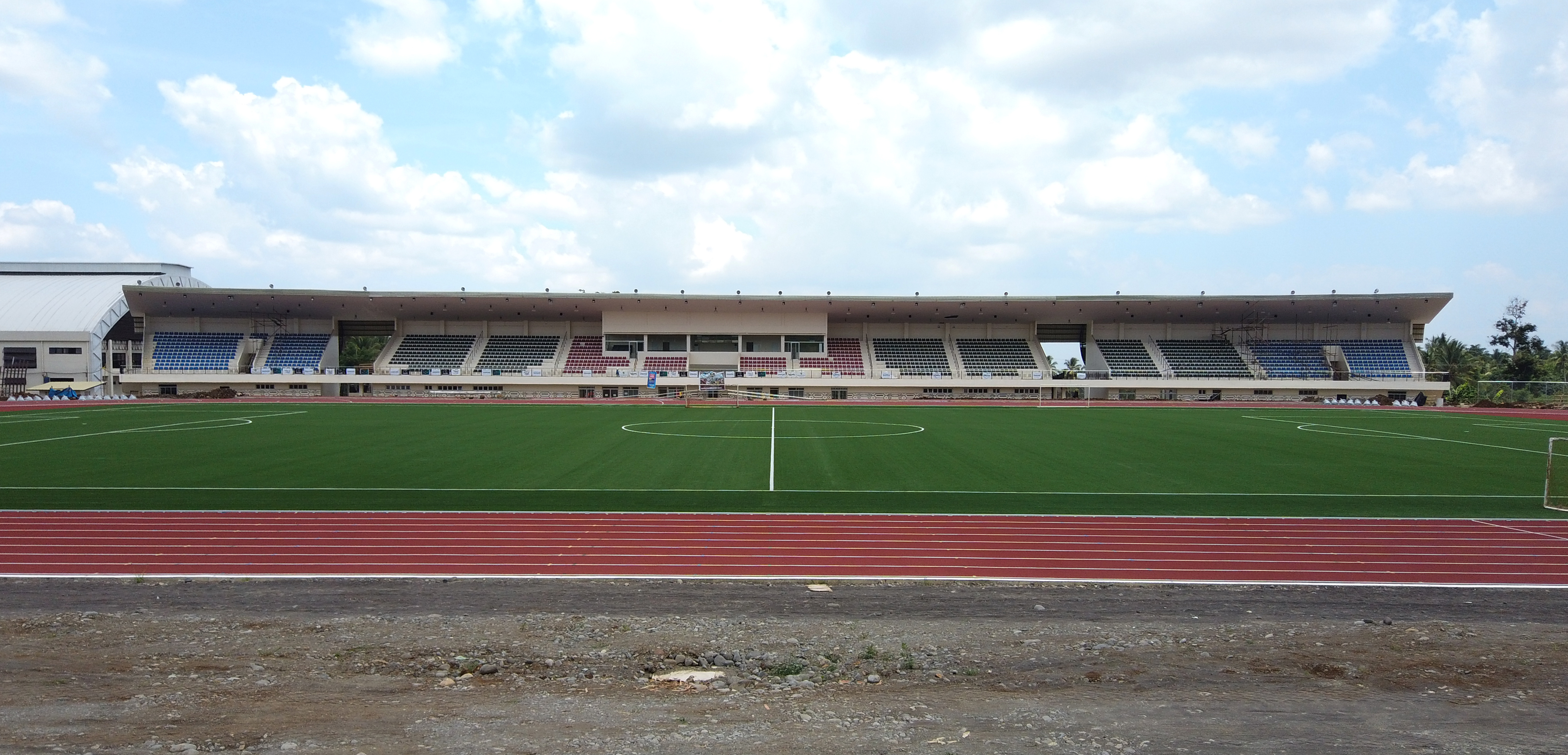
- The main stadium

- Location in Mindanao Location in the Philippines
- Full name: Davao City–University of the Philippines Sports Complex
- Location: Bago-Oshiro, Davao City, Philippines
- Coordinates: 7°05′08″N 125°28′15″E
- Operator: Government of Davao City; University of the Philippines Mindanao
- Surface: Artificial turf
- Main venue: Main Stadium; Capacity: 30,000
- Facilities: Multi-Purpose Gymnasium, Aquatics Center

Construction
- Groundbreaking: 2015
- Opened: January 26, 2019
- Cost: ₱8 billion

The Davao City–University of the Philippines Sports Complex is a sports facility complex in Davao City, Philippines.

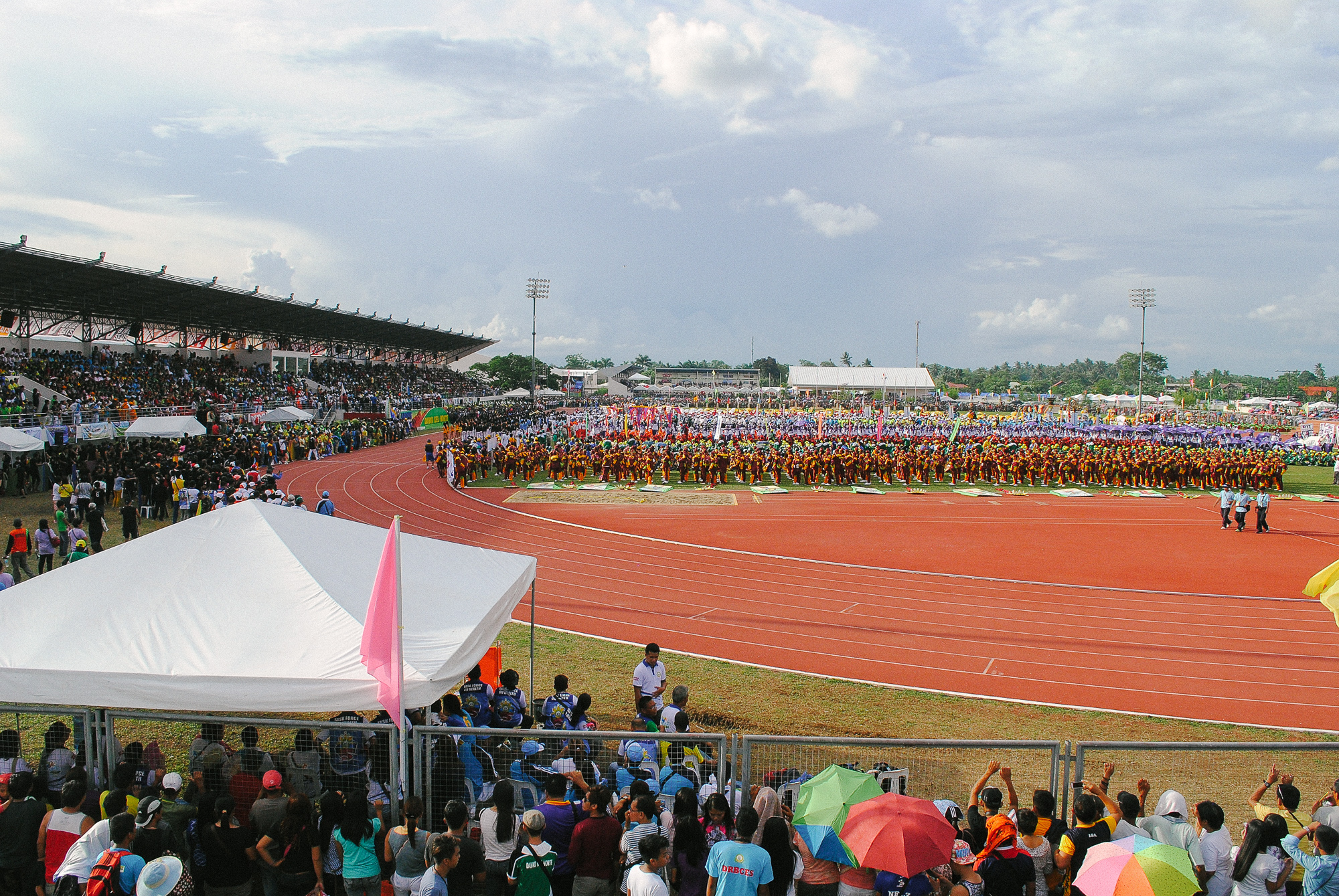
Davao City Sports Complex during event

== History ==
Isidro Ungab lobbied for the construction of the sports complex during his tenure as Congressman representing Davao City's third district. Then-Sports Development Division-City Mayors Office of Davao City William Ramirez also lobbied for the sports complex's construction. In August 2015, the Government of Davao City and the University of the Philippines Mindanao signed a memorandum of agreement where it was stated that the university will donate a 20 hectares (49 acres) property it owns to the city government for a sports complex.

The construction of the complex costing ₱8 billion is planned to be finished by 2018 in line with the city's bid to host the 2019 Palarong Pambansa. By January 2016, the construction of the facility is already in full swing.

By September 2016, the indoor multi-purpose gym or the UP Kinetics Building is 38 percent complete and the construction of phase 1 of and 2 of the stadium and athletic oval was ongoing. All facilities save for the swimming pool were already completed by December 2018 with only finishing touches including the installation of a rubber athletics track are to be made.

The Davao City Government and the University of the Philippines Mindanao signed another memorandum of understanding which formalizes their agreement to jointly operate and manage the sports complex. Part of the sports complex were used for the 2019 Davao Regional Athletic Association (DAVRAA) Meet although the sports complex is not yet complete as of November 2019.

The Davao City Sports Complex is the first public sports complex of the city since the conversion of the old PTA grounds in 2007 into a park.

== Facilities ==
The main stadium of the Davao City–UP Sports Complex hosts a football field and an athletics oval. It was designed to have a seating capacity of 30,000 people The surface of the football field of the main stadium is made of artificial grass. The main stadium is designed to meet FIFA-standards so that the facility could be suitable to host at least an AFC Asian Cup match.

The sports complex also hosts the UP Kinetics Building, an indoor multi-purpose gymnasium.
