= People's Park (Davao City) =

Urban public park in Davao City, Mindanao, Philippines

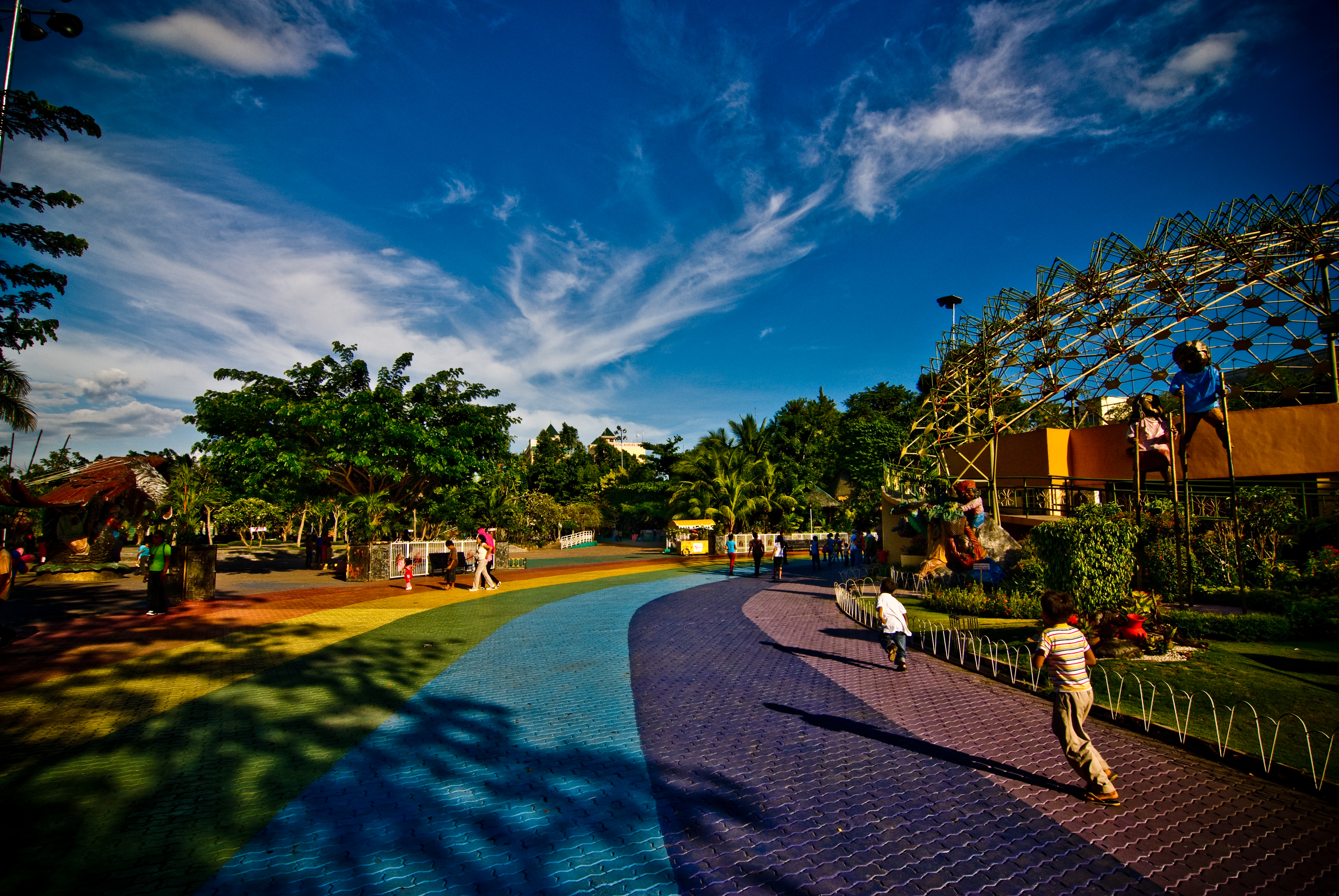
- Interactive map of People's Park
- Type: Urban park
- Location: Davao City, Mindanao, Philippines
- Coordinates: 7°4′14″N 125°36′31″E
- Area: 4 ha (9.9 acres)
- Opened: December 15, 2007; 18 years ago
- Species: 1,101 (2007)

People's Park is an urban public park in central Davao City, Mindanao, Philippines.

== History ==
The People's Park was created through the conversion of the old PTA Grounds or the Palaruang Panlunsod (lit. 'City Playground'), a sporting and events venue of the city, into a park.

The conversion of the grounds into the "PTA Park" which costed ₱71 million commenced in July 2006. The park had a soft opening in August 2007 during the Kadayawan Festival.

It was inaugurated on December 15, 2007 and was named "People's Park" which was chosen among the 918 entries of the "Name the Park" contest organized by the city government. The winning name was by Romeo Sardon, a retired engineer and seaman. In December 2007, the project was 90 percent complete, with the other 10 percent to be implemented by early 2008.

The People's Park also hosts the annual Dula Kadayawan, the tribal games of the Kadayawan Festival.

== Flora ==
Upon its inauguration in December 2007, the park hosts 1,101 species of plants and trees, both indigenous and non-indigenous planted along the park's five avenues. Non-indigenous flora came from other parts of Southeast Asia, Australia, Central and South America, New Guinea, Madagascar, and mainland Africa. The Durian Dome hosts a Bambusetum, where different species of bamboo are kept, and the Shady Plaza hosts African tulips. 10,000 square meters (110,000 sq ft) of the park's ground is allotted to plants.

== Features ==
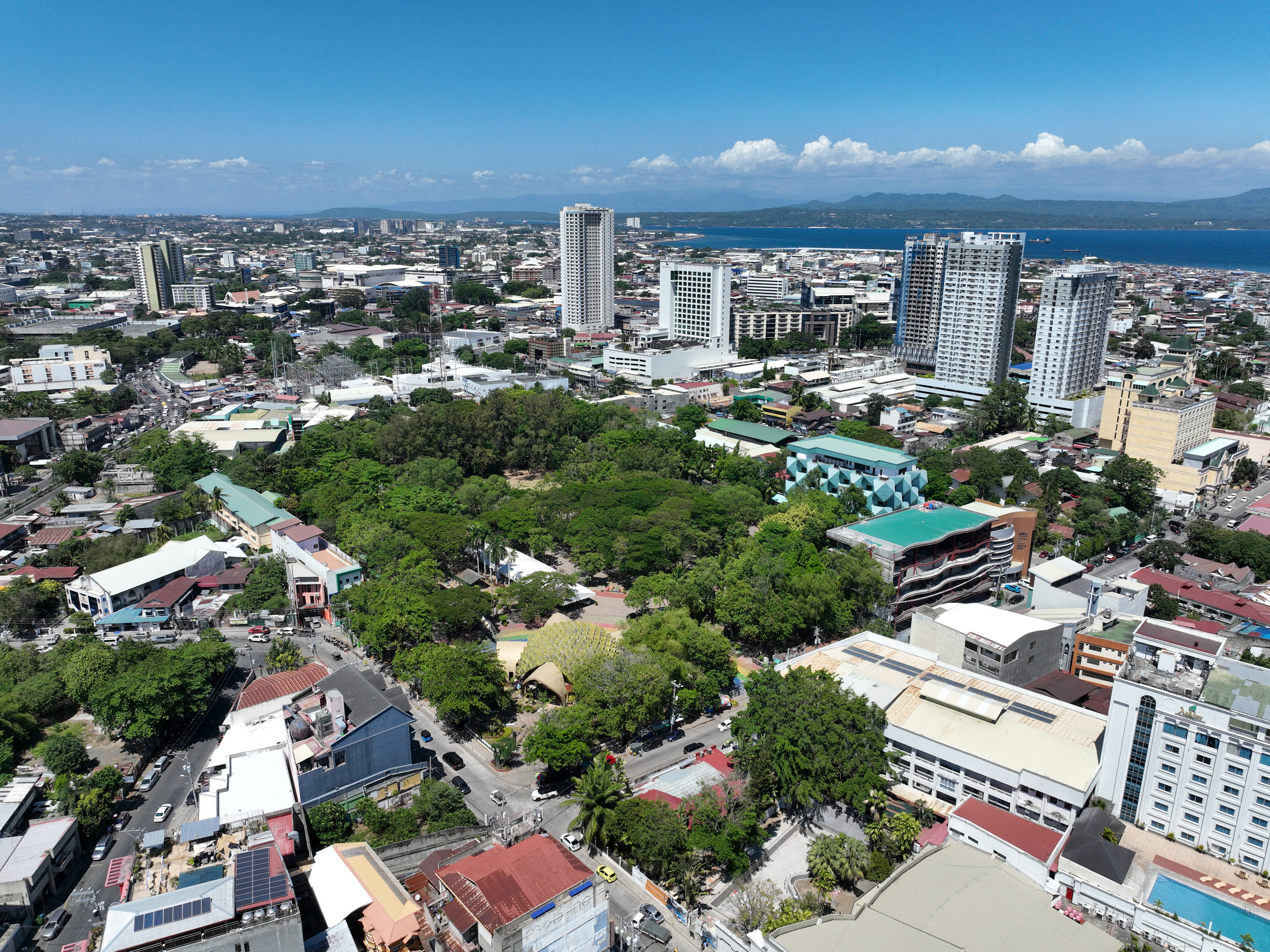
Aerial view.

The park covers an area of 4 hectares (9.9 acres). One of the main features of the park is a 425 square meters (4,570 sq ft) visitors’ center, the Durian Dome, which has a design inspired from the durian fruit. The Open Plaza hosts a rainbow walk through drive where some potted palms are displayed.

The park hosts sculptures done by Mindanao artist Kublai Millan which depicts indigenous people. A dancing fountain is also present within the park's ground. It has been described as "one of the cleanest and greenest public parks" in the Philippines.

The athletic oval of the old PTA Grounds was converted into a bricked walkway dubbed as "The Promenade". At the center of the walkway is a dancing fountain which is said to be the first in Mindanao and a footbridge.

== Gallery ==
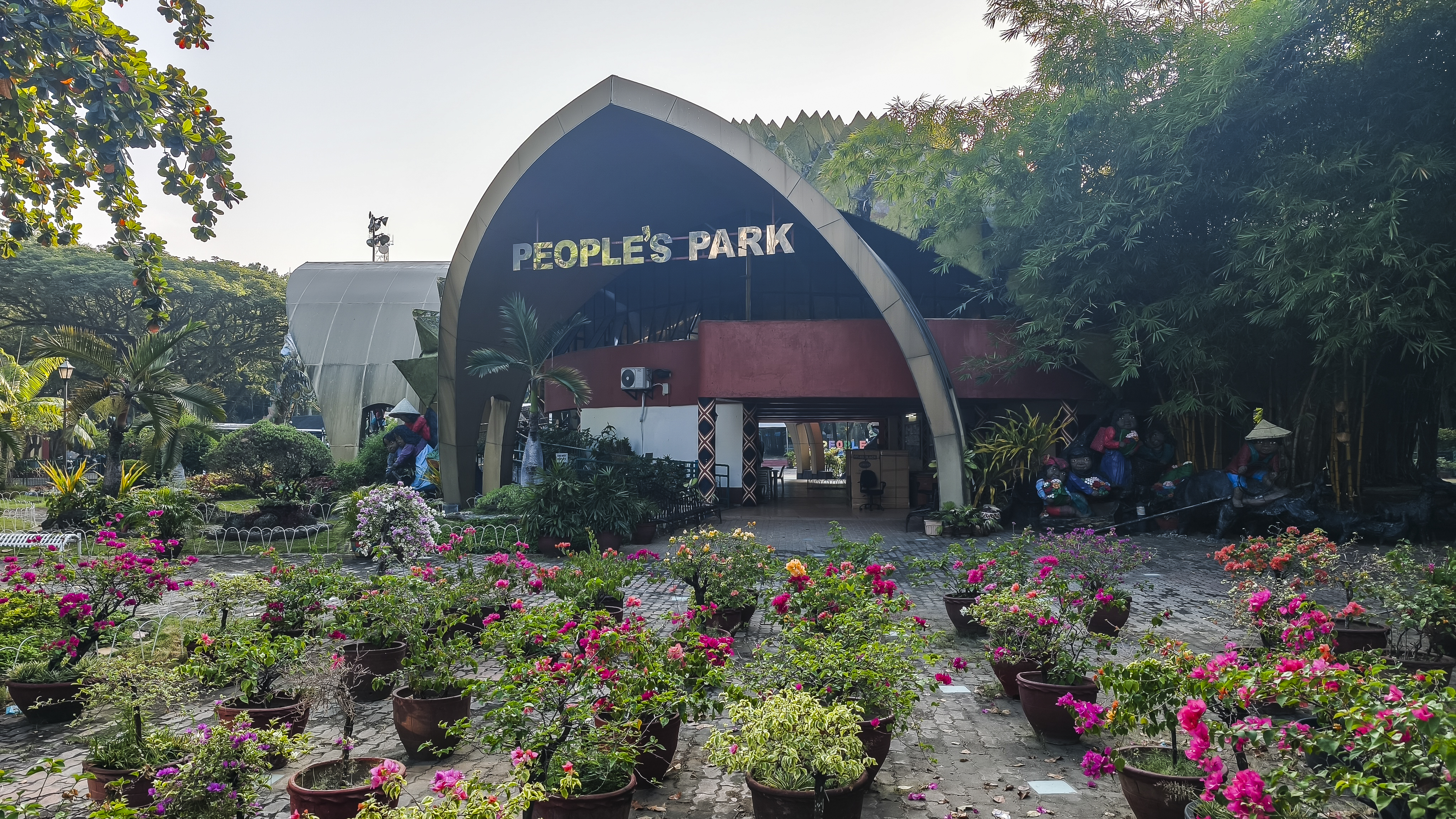

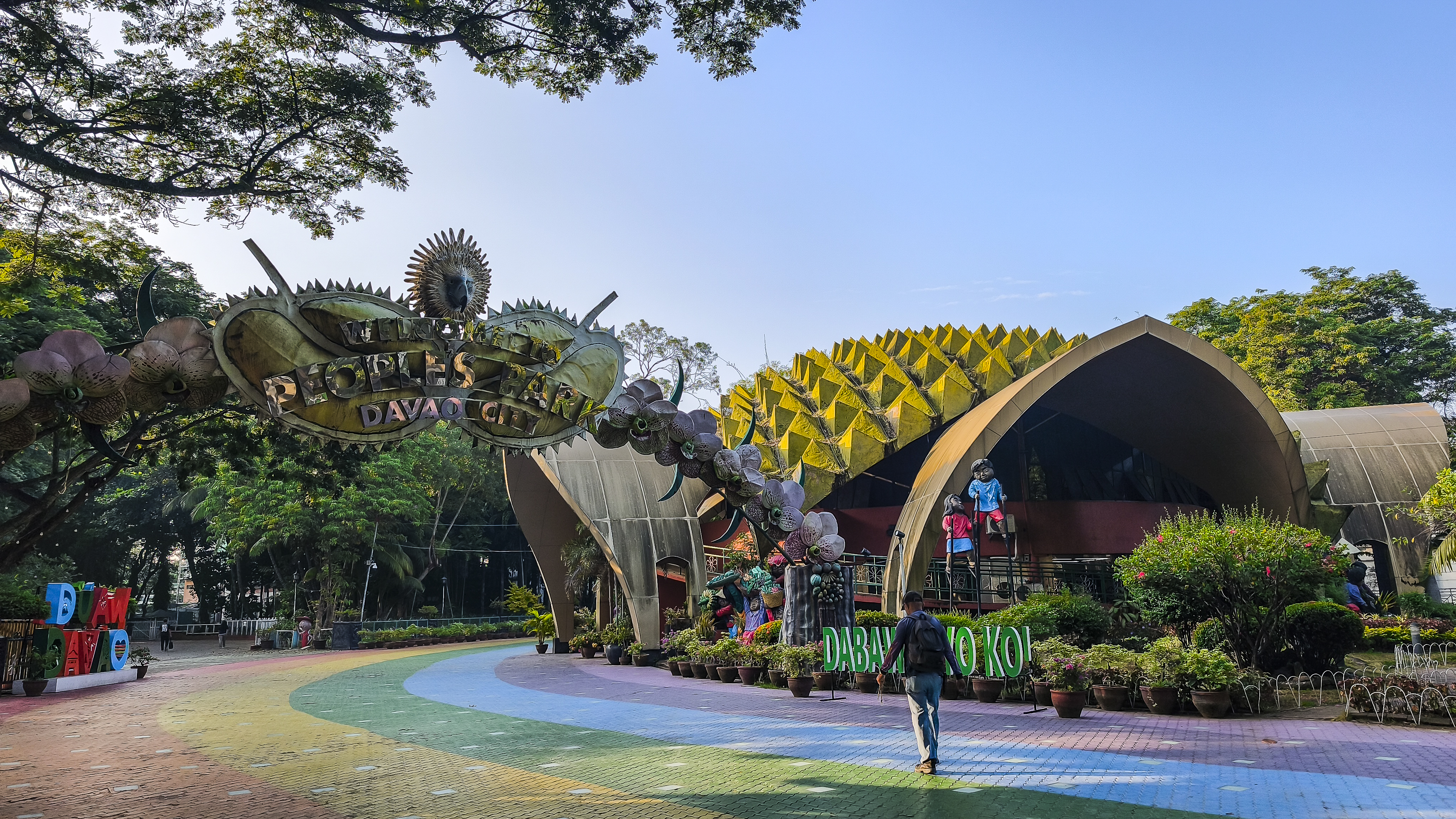

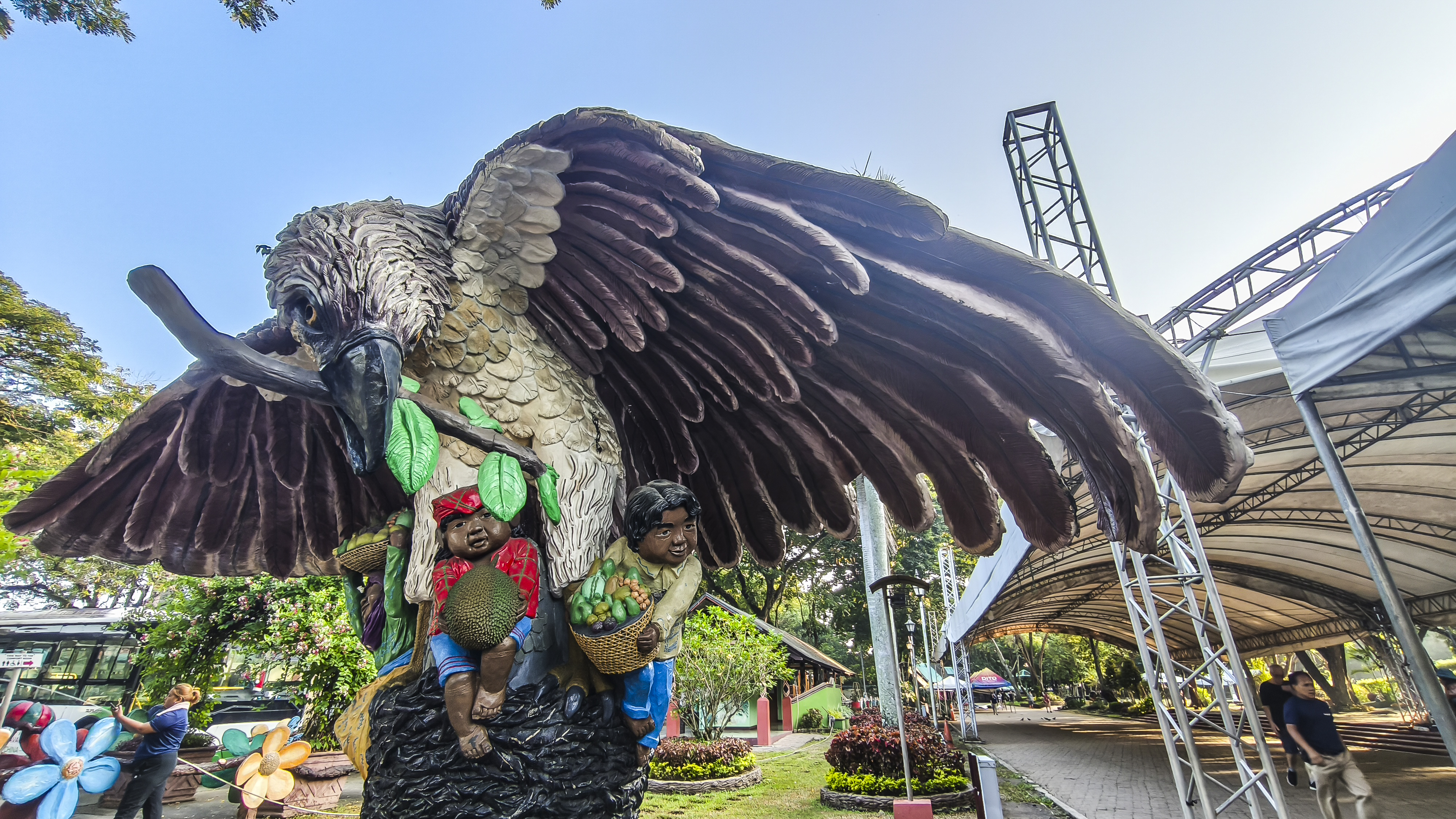

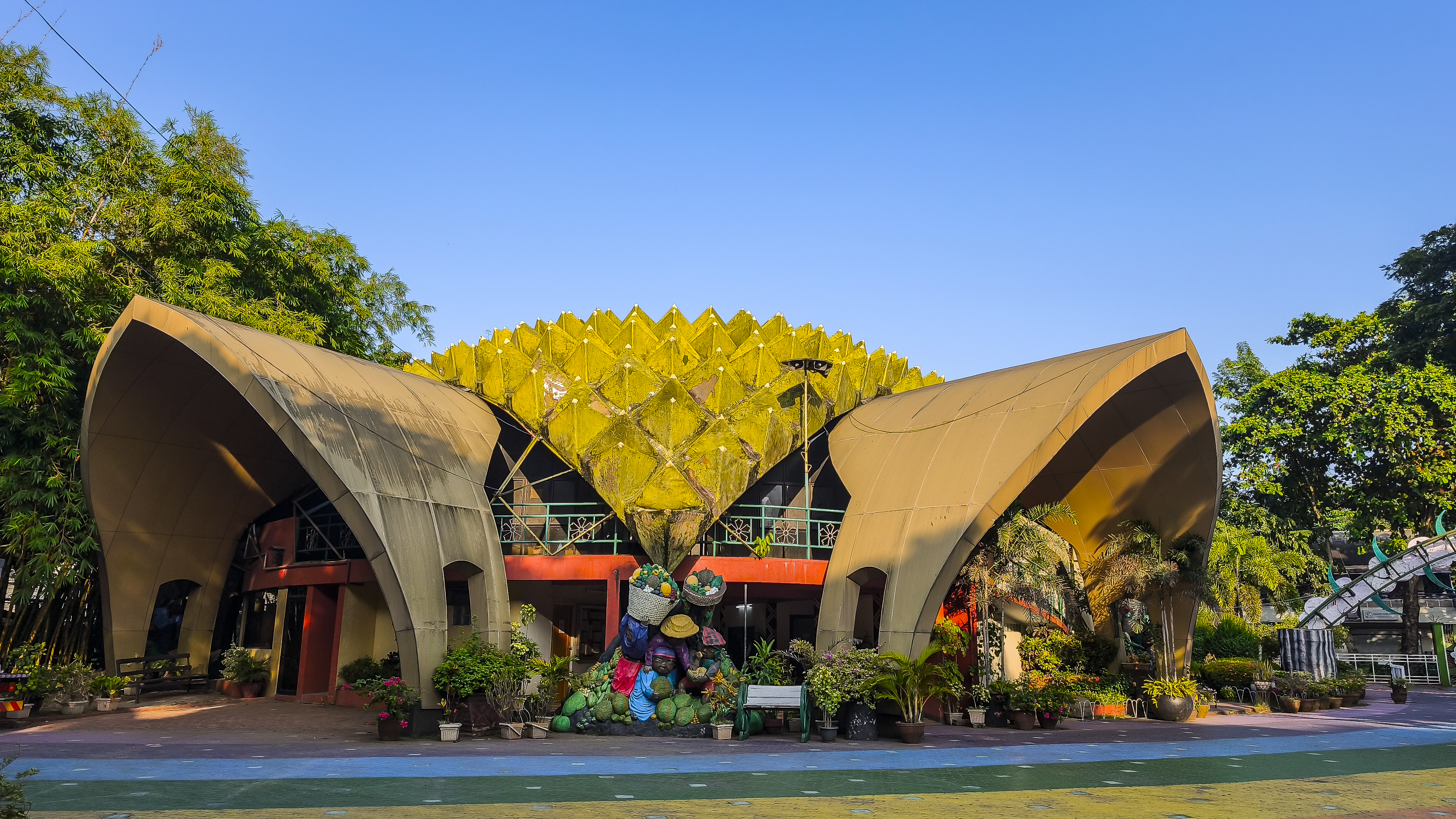

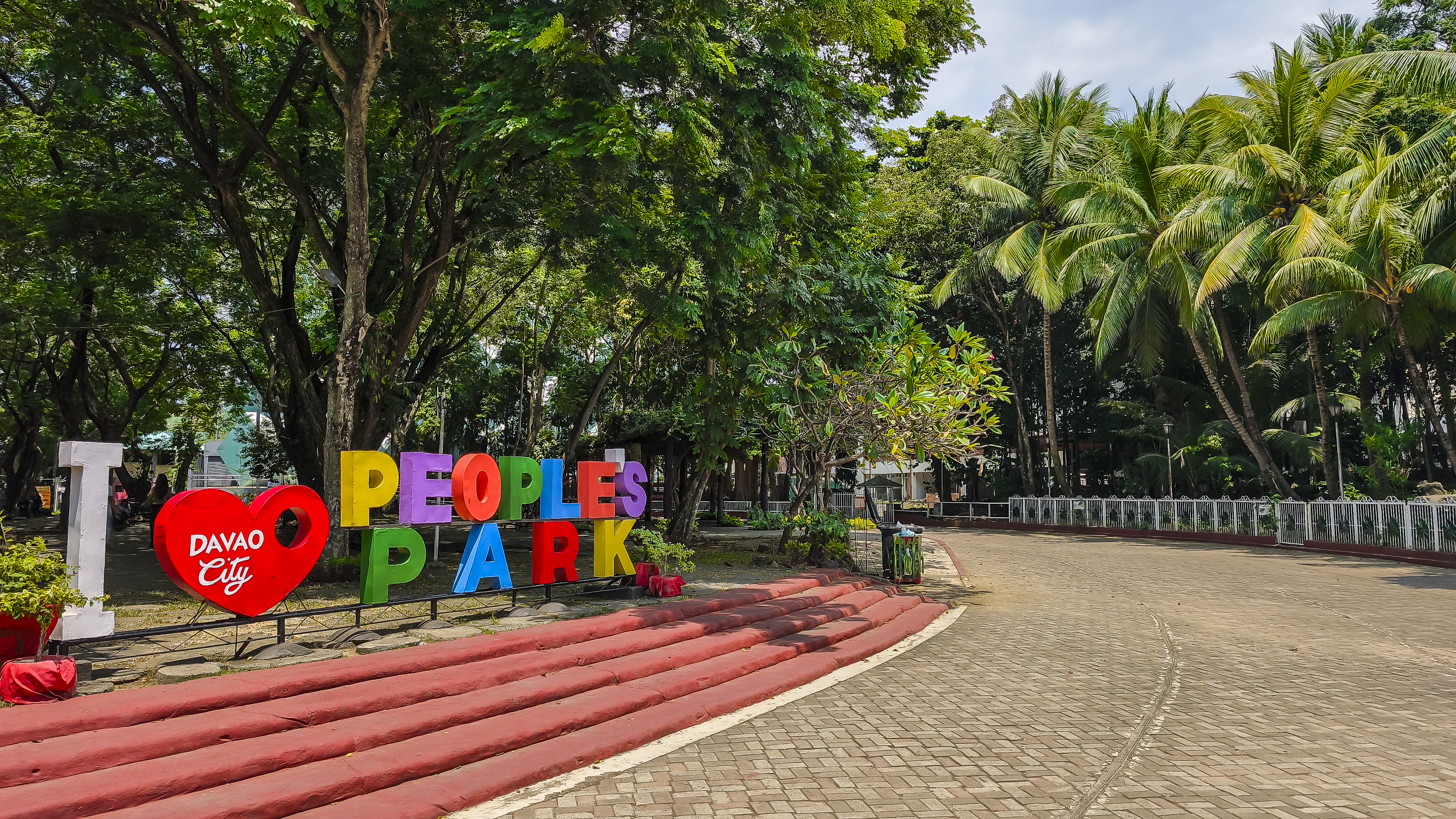

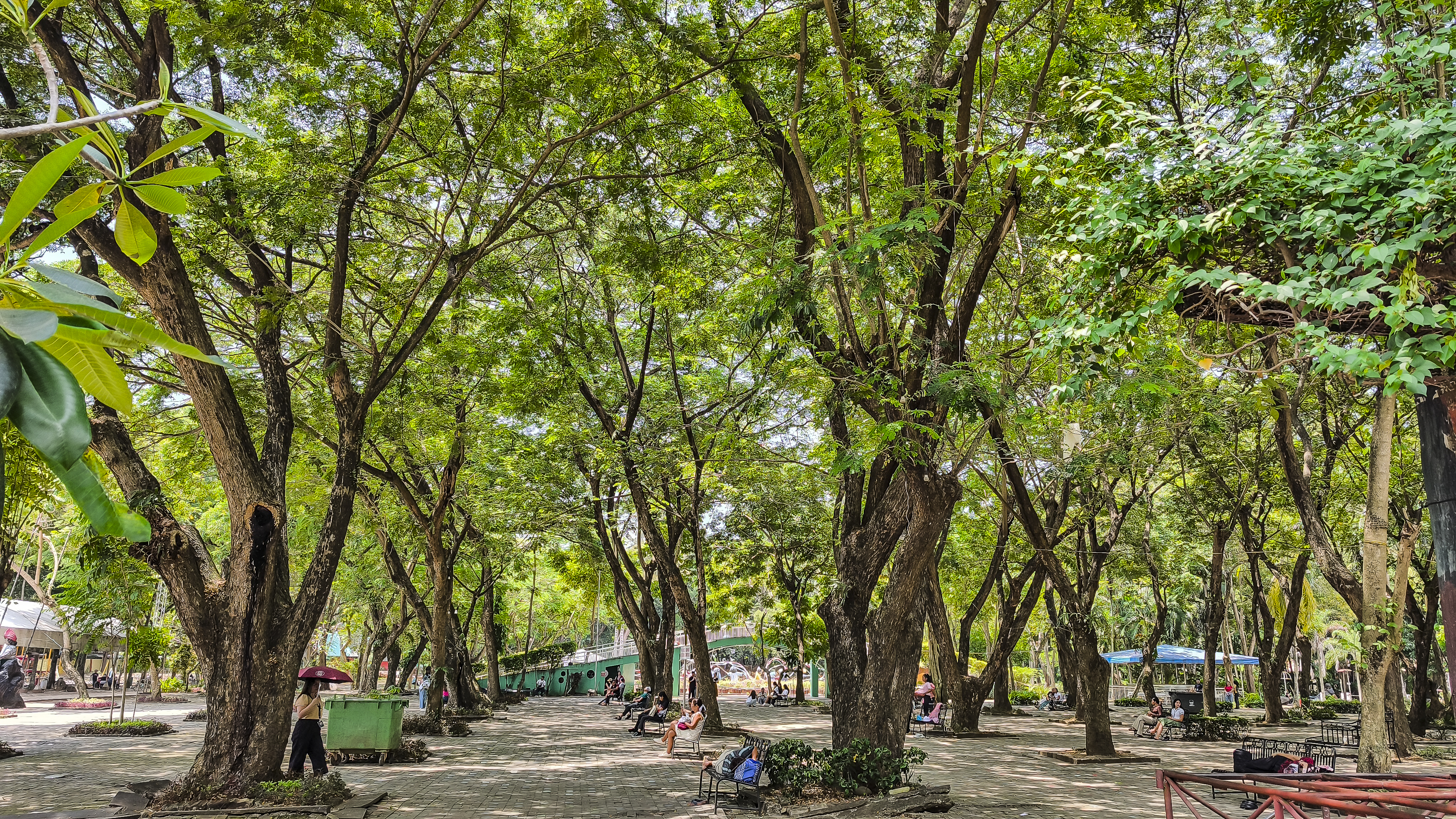
