= 2019 in Philippine sports =

The following is a list of notable events and developments that are related to Philippine sports in 2019.

== Events ==
=== Athletics ===
- March 2–3 – The Philippines hosted the 2019 Southeast Asian Youth Athletics Championships held in Ilagan, Isabela.
- April 27–28 – Subic Bay hosted the 2019 NTT ASTC Triathlon Asian Cup.
- August 11 – 2019 Regent Aguila Ironman 70.3 Asia-Pacific Championship will be held in Cebu

=== Basketball ===
==== 3x3 ====
- February 16 – The Inaugural season of the Chooks-to-Go Pilipinas 3x3 was officially opened. The Chooks-to-Go Pilipinas 3x3 President Cup took place at the events area of the SM Megamall in Mandaluyong.
- March 31 – The Pasig Grindhouse Kings defeat the San Juan Knights of the 2019 Chooks-to-go Pilipinas 3x3 Presidents Cup, also to win the championship, to be crowned as the first inaugural champions. the Grindhouse Kings awarded a check for P1 million cash prize for the head to the Doha Masters at the 2019 FIBA 3x3 World Tour in Doha, Qatar
- June 16 – The start of the 2nd Conference of the Chooks-to-Go Pilipinas 3x3 Patriots Cup took place at the events area of the SM Seaside City Cebu in Cebu City.
- July 27 – The Phenom Basilan Steel defeat the Wilkins-Balanga Pure of the 2019 Chooks-to-go Pilipinas 3x3 Patriots Cup, also to win the championship, to be crowned as the second championship. the Steel awarded a check for P1 million cash prize for the head to the 2019 FIBA 3x3 Jeddah Masters in Jeddah, Saudi Arabia
- September 1 – The start of the 3rd Conference of the Chooks-to-Go Pilipinas 3x3 Magiting Cup took place at the SM City Clark in Clark, Pampanga.
- September 21 – The Wilkins-Balanga Pure defeating the Equalivet Pasig of the 2019 Chooks-to-go Pilipinas 3x3 Magiting Cup, also to win the championship, to be crowned as the third championship. Besides bringing home cash prize to the 2019 Jeju Challenger which takes place from October 5–6.
- November 2 – The country officially qualified to the 3x3 Olympic Qualifying Tournament in Delhi, India on March 18–20, 2020

==== Amateur ====
- February 14 – The 2019 PBA D-League Aspirants' Cup officially opens at the Ynares Sports Arena, in Pasig. 20 teams including eight new expansion teams will compete in the tournament
- March 11 – The AFP Cavaliers bagged their record third straight championship title of the UNTV Cup Season 7 after they won against the Senate Defenders in the Game 2 of the Finals series at Smart Araneta Coliseum, Quezon City. AFP Cavaliers won the P4 million cash prize for their chosen beneficiary.
- June 13–25 – The Cignal-Ateneo Hawkeyes defeat the CEU Scorpions in the Game 4 of the finals series of the 2019 PBA D-League Aspirants' Cup, also to win the third championship title
- July 25 – The 2019 PBA D-League Foundation Cup officially opens at the Ynares Sports Arena, in Pasig. 14 teams including will compete in the tournament
- October 14 – The BRT Sumisip Basilan-St. Clare Saints defeat the Marinerong Pilipino Skippers in the Game 3 of the finals series of the 2019 PBA D-League Foundation Cup, to win the back to back championship title

==== Professional ====
- March 2 – The 1st Ever annual 2019 MPBL All-Star Game is held at the Mall of Asia Arena in Pasay.
- March 9 – The 2019 NBL season officially opens at the Santa Rosa Sports Complex, in Santa Rosa, Laguna. 15 teams including 5 new expansion teams will compete in the tournament
- March 29–31 – The annual 2019 PBA All-Star Weekend was held at the Calasiao Sports Complex in Calasiao, Pangasinan. Rey Guevarra was crowned as the Slam Dunk Champion. In the main event, the North All Stars crown as the dance-off champions, while its rival, the North All Stars won the All Star Game, 185–170. Three Point Shootout Peter June Simon hailed as the MVP of the game, and Beau Belga crowned as the Obstacle Challenge Champion
- April 11 – 25 – The 2019 MPBL Datu Cup Finals finishes the championship series of the 2018–19 MPBL season and the conclusion of the season's playoffs. The Northern Division champion San Juan Knights defeated The Southern Division champion Davao Occidental Tigers to win their first MPBL championship title. and Mike Ayonayon is named Finals MVP.
- May 15 – The San Miguel Beermen pulled off a rare seven-game sweep after outclassing Magnolia Hotshots, 72–71, in the 2019 PBA Philippine Cup Finals at Smart Araneta Coliseum, Quezon City.
- June 12 – The start of the Lakan Cup of the 2019–20 MPBL season opens at the Mall of Asia Arena, Pasay, 31 teams including 6 new expansion teams will compete in the tournament
- June 25 – 26 – NBA 2018 MVP and 2x NBA scoring champion (2018 & 2019) James Harden of the Houston Rockets visited the Philippines for the 4th Time for the two-day adidas Free To Harden Manila 2019 tour at the SMX Convention Center.
- July 21 – The Philippines' Mighty Sports defeats the Republic of China White, 81–71, to win the 2019 William Jones Cup.
- August 4 – 16 – The 2019 PBA Commissioner's Cup Finals finishes the championship series of the 2019 PBA season and the conclusion of the season's playoffs. The Philippine Cup champion San Miguel Beermen defeated the 2015 PBA Commissioner's Cup champion TNT KaTropa to win their 27th straight title. The Finals began with Game 1 on August 4, and ended with Game 6 on August 16.
- August 14 — San Miguel Beermen forward Arwind Santos after humbling incident was given PHP 200,000 fine by the PBA board after his a monkey gesture towards TNT import Terrence Jones in this appearance in Game 5 of the PBA Commissioner's Cup finals Wednesday at Smart Araneta Coliseum.
- November 12 – Maharlika Pilipinas Basketball League (MPBL) president Manny Pacquiao files a formal complaint with the Department of Justice against 21 individuals who were accused of game-fixing, betting and point-shaving.

==== Collegiate ====
- January 28 – The Ateneo Blue Eagles won their fourth straight championship in the 2018 PCCL National Collegiate Championship against UV Green Lancers.
- October 1 – the UP Fighting Maroons head coach Bo Perasol He was later suspended for 3 games by the UAAP after his on-court outburst, as the tournament enters the second round of eliminations. Perasol said he would appeal the decision
- October 17 The San Beda Red Lions complete an 18-game elimination round sweep in the NCAA Season 95.
- October 30 – The Ateneo Blue Eagles complete the 14-game elimination round sweep in the UAAP Season 82.
- November 6 University of Santo Tomas Soulemane Chabi Yo and Grace Irebu were named the Most Valuable Player of the Men's and Women's division in UAAP Season 82.
- November 19 – The Letran Knights won their NCAA Season 95 men's basketball title against the San Beda Red Lions in the Game 3 of the NCAA Season 95 held at Mall of Asia Arena. Point guard Fran Yu was named the Finals MVP.
- November 20 – The Ateneo Blue Eagles were crowned the UAAP Season 82 men's basketball champions after clinching an 86–79 against the UST Growling Tigers in a Game 2 for the 3rd straight title at the Mall of Asia Arena.

==== High school ====
- February 22 – The NU-Nazareth Bullpups scores a victory after beating Ateneo Blue Eaglets in the finals of the UAAP Season 81 juniors basketball tournament, reclaims their championship and NU's Carl Tamayo. hailed as the Finals MVP.
- March 18–24 – The national championships of the National Basketball Training Center League on its 12th season were held at the SM Mall of Asia Arena, Pasay. 32-team tournament will have the participants.
- May 19 – The Inaugural season of the National Basketball League Youth, a new youth basketball league was opened held at the Dominican College of Santa Rosa Gym

==== National team ====
- February 24 – The Gilas Pilipinas defeats Kazakhstan, 93–75, to clinch their spot in the 2019 FIBA Basketball World Cup.
- June 29 – July 7 – The 2019 FIBA Under-19 Basketball World Cup will be held in various locations in Greece
- July 21 – The Philippines' Mighty Sports defeat the Republic of China White, 81–71, to win the 2019 William Jones Cup

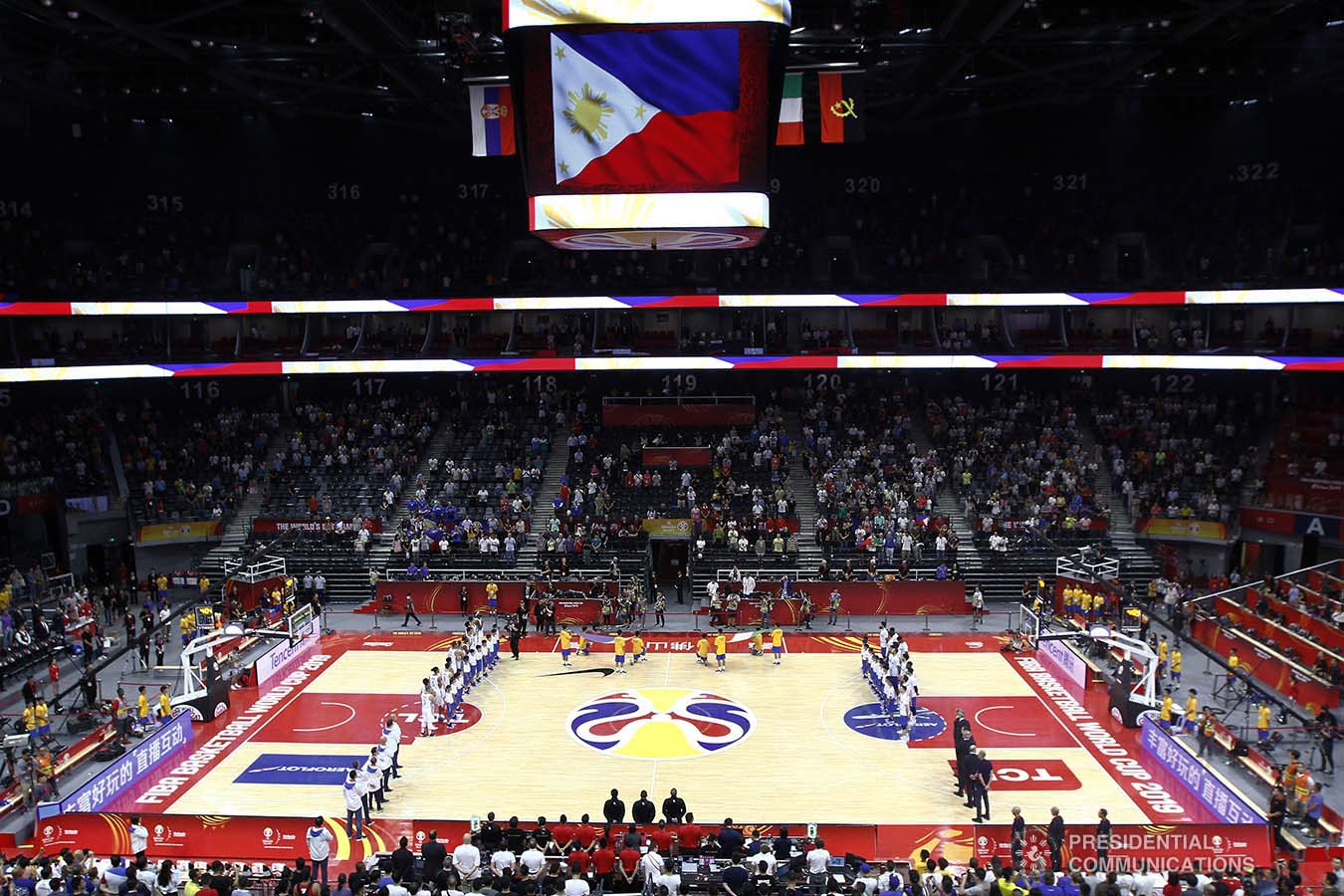
Foshan International Sports and Cultural Center the venue between Gilas Pilipinas and Italy of the 2019 FIBA Basketball World Cup Group D

- August 31 – September 15 – The Gilas Pilipinas grab their fifth losses in the 2019 FIBA Basketball World Cup the Philippines with a 0–5 record, in four decades the country's worst performance since the 1978 edition
- September 22 Tim Cone officially gets the green light to take over the coaching duties for the national team heading to the 2019 Southeast Asian Games.

==== Women's basketball ====
- April 7 – The inaugural season of the Women's National Basketball League (WNBL), a new amateur basketball league for women was commenced thru opening ceremonies at the Hagonoy Sports Complex in Taguig.
- October 15 The PSI Air Force swept the Taguig Lady Generals to be named the inaugural Women's National Basketball League (Philippines) champs

=== Baseball ===
- January 4 — The first match of the inaugural season of the Philippine Baseball League, the first professional baseball league was played.
- April 5 – The De La Salle Green Batters beating the Ateneo Blue Batters in the finals of UAAP Season 81 baseball tournament marking the fifth championship title

=== Boxing ===
- January 19 – Manny Pacquiao wins via unanimous decision against American boxer Adrien Broner to retain WBA welterweight title. at the MGM Grand Garden Arena in Las Vegas, Nevada.
- April 20 – Reigning Interim WBO bantamweight champion Johnriel Casimero made a first successful title defense and after he defeated Mexican boxer Ricardo Espinoza Franco in the co-main event held at the Dignity Health Sports Park, Carson, California
- April 27 – Nonito Donaire was crowned himself as the new WBA "Super" bantamweight champion and after he defeated American boxer Stephon Young for the WBA World Boxing Super Series Semi-finals held in Cajundome, Lafayette, Louisiana.
- May 4 – Filipino champion Jerwin Ancajas has scored a dominant victory over mandatory challenger Ryuichi Funai of Japan to successfully retain the IBF junior bantamweight belt at Stockton Arena, in Stockton, California.
- June 1 – Marlon Tapales and Jhack Tepora, who both lost their world titles on the scales, headlined the Premier Boxing Champions fight card against a pair of Latino opponents.

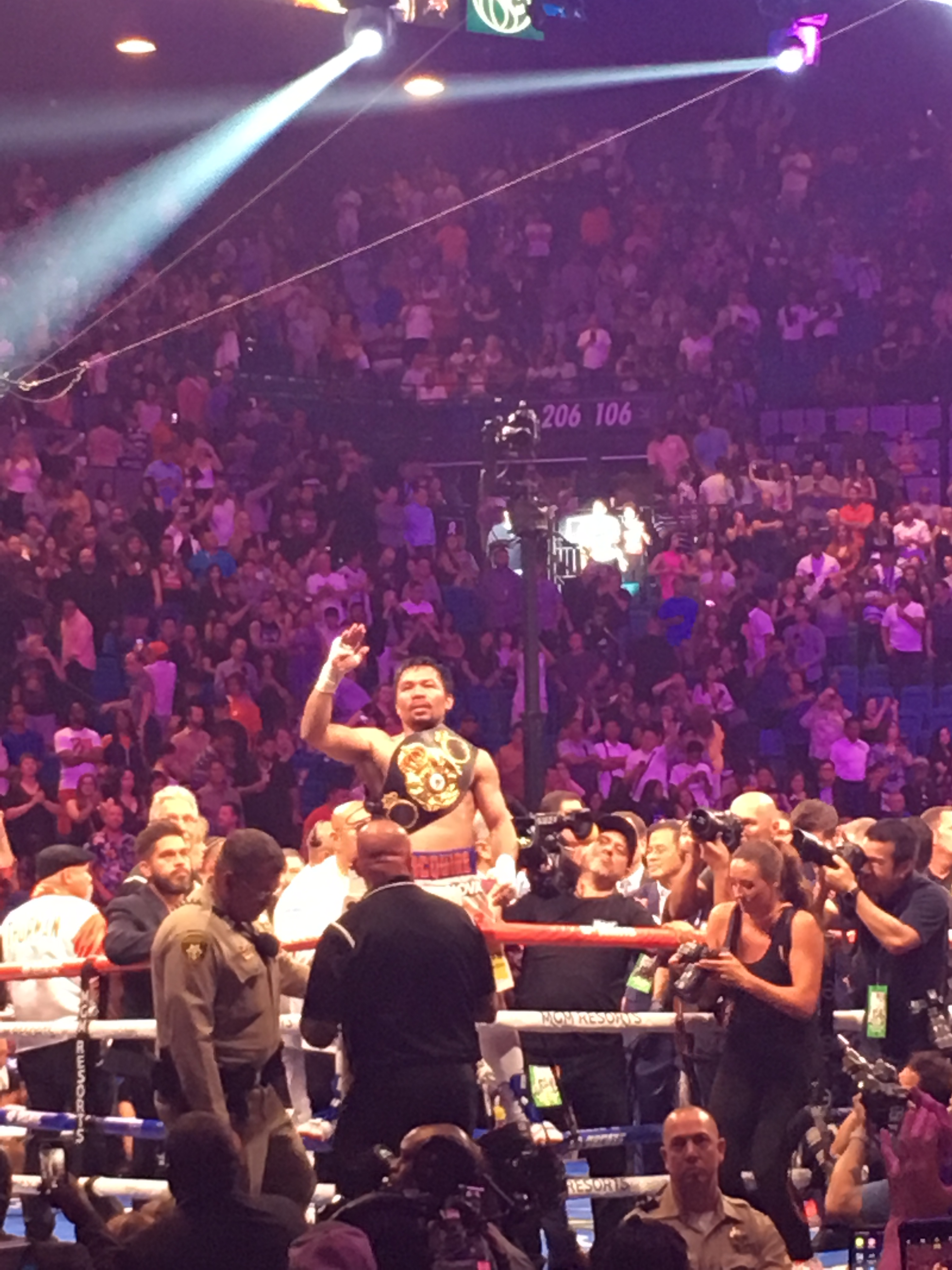
Pacquiao greets the crowd after his victory over Thurman.

- July 20 – Manny Pacquiao wins via split decision against American boxer Keith Thurman to claim the WBA super welterweight title. at the MGM Grand Garden Arena in Las Vegas, Nevada.
- August 17 – Albert Pagara wins via 1st round by TKO against Ratchanon Sawangsoda of Thailand to winning the WBO Inter-Continental Super bantamweight title held in Ormoc Superdome in Ormoc City
- August 24 – Johnriel Casimero defeats Mexican boxer Cesar Ramirez to retain his interim WBO bantamweight title via Round 10 Knockout at the San Andres Sports Complex, Manila
- August 25 – Carlo Peñalosa has failed in his bid to become a world champion again after losing via technical split decision to Mexican veteran Maximino Flores in their (IBO) flyweight title bout in TV5 Studio in Novaliches, Quezon City
- November 1 – Jerwin Ancajas mandatory title defense against Jonathan Javier Rodriguez had to be cancelled due to the Mexican's visa issues.
- November 7 – Nonito Donaire has failed in his bid to become a world champion again after losing via unanimous decision by Japanese boxer Naoya Inoue to grab the IBF and WBA bantamweight titles in the World Boxing Super Series bantamweight final, which was held in Saitama Super Arena in Saitama, Japan.

=== Collegiate sports ===
- March 28 – The conclusion of the NCAA Season 94 cheerleading competition and closing ceremonies was hosted by University of Perpetual Help System DALTA held at the Mall of Asia Arena, Pasay.
- July 7 – The NCAA Season 95 officially was opened at the Mall of Asia Arena. Arellano University, for the first time, will be the hosting the oldest college sports league this season.
- September 1 – The UAAP Season 82 was opened. Ateneo De Manila University hosts the season.

=== Cheerdance, streetdance, and dancesport ===
- March 23 – The La Salle Dance Company – Street as the seniors champions and the UST Galvanize as the juniors champions proclaimed as the champions of the UAAP Season 81 Streetdance Competition held at the Smart Araneta Coliseum.
- November 17 – NU Pep Squad was the crowned as the UAAP Season 82 Cheerdance Competition claimed their second title held at the Mall of Asia Arena

=== Diving ===
- April 13 – El Nido, Palawan hosts the 11th season of the 2019 Red Bull Cliff Diving World Series, the first time the country as hosts.

=== Football ===
- January 7–16 – The Philippines makes their first-ever appearance in the AFC Asian Cup. The national team fails to advance past beyond the group stage in the edition of the tournament hosted in the United Arab Emirates.
- April 27 – The inaugural season of the Philippine Premier League, the country's first nationwide professional football league was played after two seasons of Philippines Football League
- May 16
  - De La Salle Lady Boosters claimed their 11th Championship title after defeating the FEU Lady Tamaraws in the finals of the UAAP season 81 Women's Football tournament
  - The Ateneo Blue Eagles claimed their 8th Championship title after defeating the De La Salle Green Archers in the UAAP season 81 Men's Football tournament
- May 25 – The start of the third season of the 2019 Philippines Football League, after the league folded to give way for the Philippine Premier League

=== Gymnastics ===
- October 12 — Carlos Yulo clinches a gold medal for the Philippines at the men's floor event of the 2019 World Artistic Gymnastics Championships in Stuttgart, Germany. It is the country's first-ever gold medal at the World Artistic Gymnastics Championships.

=== Ice hockey ===
- March 1–9 – the Philippines claimed the silver medal to win the 2019 IIHF Challenge Cup of Asia held in Kuala Lumpur, Malaysia. Steven Füglister was named MVP of the tournament.
- April 14–19 – the Philippines won the gold medal to win the 2019 IIHF Women's Challenge Cup of Asia Division I held in Abu Dhabi, United Arab Emirates.

=== Mixed martial arts ===
- January 19 – Joshua Pacio suffered a loss the ONE Strawweight Championship in a split decision defeats Yosuke Saruta at ONE: Eternal Glory held at the Istora Senayan in Jakarta, Indonesia.
- January 25 – Adriano Moraes retains his ONE Flyweight championship in a unanimous decision over Geje Eustaquio at ONE: Hero's Ascent held at the Mall of Asia Arena in Pasay.
- March 16 – Stephen Loman retains his BRAVE FC Bantamweight championship in a RD 4 TKO over Elias Boudegzdame at BRAVE: STORM OF WARRIORS fight held at the Mall of Asia Arena in Pasay.
- March 31
  - Kevin Belingon suffered a loss the ONE Bantamweight Championship defeats Bibiano Fernandes due to Illegal Elbows to Back of Head in the 3rd round of their main event of ONE Championship: A New Era in Tokyo, Japan
  - Team Lakay Eduard Folayang suffered a loss the ONE Lightweight Championship defeats Shinya Aoki due to Arm-Triangle Choke in the 1st round of the ONE Championship: A New Era in Tokyo, Japan
- April 12 – Joshua Pacio retains his ONE Strawweight World Title with a KO win over Yosuke Saruta at ONE Championship: Roots of Honor.
- October 13 – Brandon Vera lost in his bid to become a two-division World Champion after losing to Aung La N Sang at ONE Championship: CENTURY
- November 8 – Joshua Pacio defends his ONE Strawweight World Title against fellow Filipino Rene Catalan at ONE: MASTERS OF FATE in the Mall of Asia Arena

=== Multi-sporting events ===
- March 14–22 – The Philippine delegation, consisting 7,500 athletes from 190 countries by participate 24 sports, participating at the 2019 Special Olympics World Summer Games in Abu Dhabi, UAE
- April 27–May 5 – Davao City hosted the 2019 Palarong Pambansa.
- July 3–14 – Athletics: Philippine Pole vaulter Ernest Obiena won the Philippines' first gold medal in the 2019 Summer Universiade, capturing the boy's men's pole vault event at the Stadio San Paolo in Naples, Campania, Italy.

=== POC and PSC ===
- July 28 – Abraham Tolentino formally claimed as newly president of Philippine Olympic Committee after winning the elections over Philip Ella Juico, 24–20, in the special elections held at the Century Park Hotel.

=== Rugby Union ===
- June 2 – The Philippines national rugby union team defeats Singapore 29–21 to win the 2019 Asia Rugby Championship division 1 finals held in Taipei, Taiwan.

=== Softball ===
- April 2 – The Adamson Lady Falcons beats the UST Golden Tigresses in the finals of UAAP Season 81 softball tournament marking the ninth straight championship title in 9 straight years, Lyca Basa was named as Finals MVP

=== Volleyball ===
- February 8 – the Perpetual Altas claims the NCAA Season 94 men's volleyball title after beating CSB Blazers. Perpetual Help's Joebert Almodiel was hailed as the Finals MVP.
- February 12 – the Arellano Lady Chiefs seals their fourth championship title in the NCAA season 94 women's volleyball against the Perpetual Lady Altas in 3 games. Regine Anne Arocha collected her 2nd consecutive finals MVP.
- May 4 – the Petron Blaze Spikers sealed their fifth championship title in the 2019 PSL Grand Prix Conference against F2 Logistics Cargo Movers in 4 games. Stephanie Niemer was Named the Finals MVP.
- May 15 – the NU Bulldogs are once again the UAAP season 81 Men's Volleyball champions after they defeated the FEU Tamaraws, in four hard-fought sets, on Game 2 of the best of 3 series. Bryan Bagunas was named as the Finals MVP. Bryan Bagunas was named as the Finals MVP.
- May 18 – the Ateneo Lady Eagles won their third championship after defeating the UST Golden Tigresses of the UAAP Women's Volleyball in the Season 81 Finals at the Mall of Asia Arena in Pasay. Bea de Leon was awarded as finals MVP. Bea de Leon was awarded as finals MVP.
- June 15 – the 2019 PSL All-Filipino Conference officially opened at the Filoil Flying V Arena, San Juan.
- July 14 – the Petro Gazz Angels won their first championship title during the 2019 Premier Volleyball League Reinforced Conference after defeating Creamline Cool Smashers in 3 games, Alyssa Valdez was named as conference MVP and Janisa Johnson was named as finals' MVP.
- July 21 – the Cignal HD Spikers won their fourth championship during the 2019 Spikers’ Turf Reinforced Conference after defeating Philippine Air Force Jet Spikers in 2 games, Alnakran Abdilla was named as conference MVP and Marck Espejo was named as finals' MVP.
- August 27 – The F2 Logistics Cargo Movers won their fourth straight championship title in the 2019 PSL All-Filipino Conference Tournament against Cignal HD Spikers in three straight sets: 25–14, 25–16, and 25–19. Tyler-Marie Kalei Mau, a Fil-American Volleyball player was named as the Finals MVP of the season.
- October 12 – the Adamson Lady Falcons won their first championship in the Premier Volleyball League (collegiate conference) after defeating the UST Golden Tigresses in two games. Trisha Mae Genesis was awarded conference most valuable player and Louie Romero was awarded the finals' most valuable player.
- October 17 – the F2 Logistics Cargo Movers won their fifth championship in the Philippine Super Liga (invitational conference) after defeating the Petron Blaze Spikers in five sets. Mary Joy Baron of F2 Logistics Cargo Movers was awarded the finals' most valuable player.
- November 9 – the Creamline Cool Smashers were once again champions of the Premier Volleyball League (PVL). Defeating the PetroGazz Angels in two games with a historic conference sweep (20 wins – 0 loss). It was Jema Galanza's first MVP award since joining the league and Jia Morado's third finals' MVP award.

==== Beach volleyball ====
- May 23–26 – The Beach Volleyball Republic (BVR) returns to hosts the 2019 FIVB Beach Volleyball World Tour Boracay Open at the White House Beach Resort in Boracay Station 1.

=== Weightlifting ===
- April 20–28 – Weightlifter Hidilyn Diaz won the Philippines a silver medal in the 2019 Asian Weightlifting Championships, in the women's 55-kilograms event, as well as Mary Flor Diaz, who won a bronze medal in the women's 45-kilograms event held in China.

=== Other events ===
- January 9 – After 6 years and 10 months, Hyper was rebranded as One Sports, the relaunch of international and localized sports channel in partnership with MVP-owned media properties 5 and ESPN5. WWE Smackdown was the first program aired on the newly rebranded channel.
- January 13 – 5 gets a new refreshed logo and along with its sister network, AksyonTV officially relaunched as 5 Plus. 5 Plus's programs now airs additional sports content and sports-related programs targeted to millennials; it also serves as a competitor to ABS-CBN's S+A, which also carries the same format.
- July 21 – ABS-CBN aired the boxing match between Manny Pacquiao and American boxer Keith Thurman, billed as the "Welterweight Supremacy" which took place at MGM Grand Garden Arena in Las Vegas, Nevada USA. The boxing match is also broadcast live on pay-per-view through ABS-CBN's subsidiary company Sky Cable and TV5 Network's sister company Cignal TV and on radio via ABS-CBN's AM radio station DZMM Radyo Patrol 630 also Simulcast on DZMM TeleRadyo and all Radio ABS-CBN Radio stations; with rebroadcasts on the former's sister network S+A
- October 1 – After a long years of broadcast coverage, Solar Entertainment Corporation has ceased broadcast of the following channels Basketball TV and NBA Premium TV as the contract with the National Basketball Association expires on that date. After the closure of both networks and the expiration of the Solar contract, the NBA announced that ABS-CBN Sports will assuming the exclusive Philippine broadcast holder for all games beginning in the 2019–20 season; with its mother (Saturday games only during regular season) and their sister network will retain their rights to free-to-air broadcasts of the NBA, while their cable channel Liga will take over as the cable broadcaster. Fox Sports will also continued to carry the cable broadcasts of the association's Thursday and Saturday games during the regular season as part of their time brokerage agreement with ABS-CBN beginning this season. Other BTV programs (including the National Basketball League, the Women's National Basketball League, the EuroLeague and Liga ACB) will be migrated to Solar Sports.

=== Other sports ===
- July 7–12, Floorball – The 2019 Men's Asia-Oceania Floorball Cup was held in Biñan, Laguna. The Philippines, the hosts, finished third.
- September 3, Athletics – Pole vaulter Ernest John "EJ" Obiena became the first Filipino to qualify for the 2020 Tokyo Olympics after surpassing the 5.80-meter qualifying standard in an athletics meet in Chiara, Italy.
- September 20, Wrestling – The World Wrestling Entertainment (WWE) returns to the Philippines for a one-night event, which was held at the Smart Araneta Coliseum.
- October 8, Gymnastics – Filipino gymnast Carlos Edriel Yulo has qualified to compete in the upcoming 2020 Tokyo Olympics after placing 18th in the individual all-around qualification of the 49th FIG Artistic Gymnastics World Championships for the men's division which was held in Stuttgart, Germany.
- October 13:
  - Boxing – Filipina boxer Nesthy Petecio bagged the gold medal in the featherweight division of the 2019 AIBA Women's World Boxing Championships which was held in Ulan-Ude, Russia.
  - Karate – Jamie Berberabe Lim, daughter of PBA legend Avelino "Samboy" Lim, wins a gold medal in the 2019 Amatör Spor Haftasi Karate Championship in Sakarya, Turkey.
- October 24:
  - Fencing – Filipino teen fencer Samantha Kyle Catantan wins the gold medal in the Asian Under 23 Fencing Championships in Bangkok, Thailand.
  - Weightlifting – Vanessa Sarno of the Philippines captured two gold medals and one silver medal, while fellow Filipinos Chariz Macawli and Rosegie Ramos took home a silver and two bronze medals in the 2019 Asian Youth and Junior Weightlifting Championships in Pyongyang, North Korea.
- October 27, Ice Skating – Eleven-year-old skater Katrina Amber Cruz wins 4 gold medals at the Skate Indonesia Leg of the Ice Skating Institute Asia (ISIAsia) Championship Series 2019, which was held in Jakarta.
- November 10, Archery – Andrea Robles won a gold medal at the 2019 Indoor Archery World Series, which was held in China.

== Recognitions ==
2019 PSA Annual Awards, organized by Philippine Sportswriters Association held on February 26, 2019, at the Centennial Hall, Manila Hotel, Manila

Award	Winner	Sport/Team	References
Ms. Volleyball	Jaja Santiago	Volleyball (Middle Blocker, NU Lady Bulldogs (UAAP), Foton Tornadoes Blue Energy (PSL), Philippines women's national volleyball team (Asian Games, AVC Cup) / Import, Ageo Medics (V.League) )	
Lifetime Achievement Award	Bong Coo; Paquito Rivas	Bowling (Filipina bowling world champion / 1979 International Masters World Champion / Secretary General, Philippine Bowling Federation); Cycling (Filipino cycling legend / 1979 Marlboro Tour Champion / Race Director, Le Tour de Filipinas)	
Executive of the Year	Enrique Razon	Golf (Chairman, International Container Terminal Services, Inc (ICTSI), Major Sponsor of the Philippine Golf Tour)	

== Awards ==
- February 26 – 2019 PSA Annual Awards

== Deaths ==
January

- January 11 – Angelo Constantino, (b. 1970), bowler
- January 12 – Nes Pamilar, (b. 1966), volleyball head coach.

April

- April 9 – Emmanuel Tangkion, (b. 1971), former PBA referee
- April 11 – Rafael Poliquit, (b. 1988), marathoner

May

- May 19 — Susan Papa, (b. 1954) Filipino swimmer.

June

- June 30 – Miguel Bonalos, (b. 1999) former basketball player

July

- July 21 — Claro Pellosis, (b. 1960) Olympic sprinter

== See also ==
- 2019 in the Philippines
- 2019 in sports
