= 2019 Palarong Pambansa =

Philippine multi-sport event

62nd Palarong Pambansa
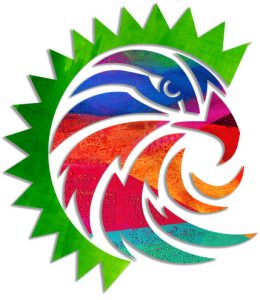
- Host city: Davao City
- Country: Philippines
- Motto: "Shaping the Future through Sports"
- Teams: 17 regional athletic associations
- Athletes: 15,000
- Opening: April 27, 2019
- Closing: May 4, 2019
- Opened by: Philippine President Rodrigo Duterte
- Ceremony venue: Davao City-UP Sports Complex

The 2019 Palarong Pambansa, officially known as the 62nd Palarong Pambansa, was a multi-sport event held in Davao City, from April 27 to May 4, 2019. Student-athletes from 17 athletic associations consisting the 17 regions of the Philippines competed in different sporting events and disciplines.

== Hosting ==
Davao City division wins the bid for the 2019 games over Zamboanga Province, Misamis Occidental, and General Santos City. It was also the second consecutive time in Davao Region to host the games since 2015 in Tagum City.

2019 Palarong Pambansa bids
City/municipality	Province/region
Davao City	Davao Region
Zamboanga City	Zamboanga Peninsula
Oroquieta, Tangub, Ozamiz	Misamis Occidental
General Santos	Soccsksargen

Winning bid

== The Games ==
=== Sports ===
Demonstration sports

- Dancesport
- Gymnastics
  - Aerobics
- Pencak Silat

Parasports

- Athletics
- Bocce
- Goalball
- Swimming

Regular sports

- Archery
- Arnis
- Athletics
- Badminton
- Baseball
- Basketball
- Billiards
- Boxing
- Chess
- Football
- Futsal
- Gymnastics
  - Artistic
  - Rhythmic
- Sepak takraw
- Softball
- Swimming
- Table tennis
- Taekwondo
- Tennis
- Volleyball
- Wrestling
- Wushu

=== Participating teams ===
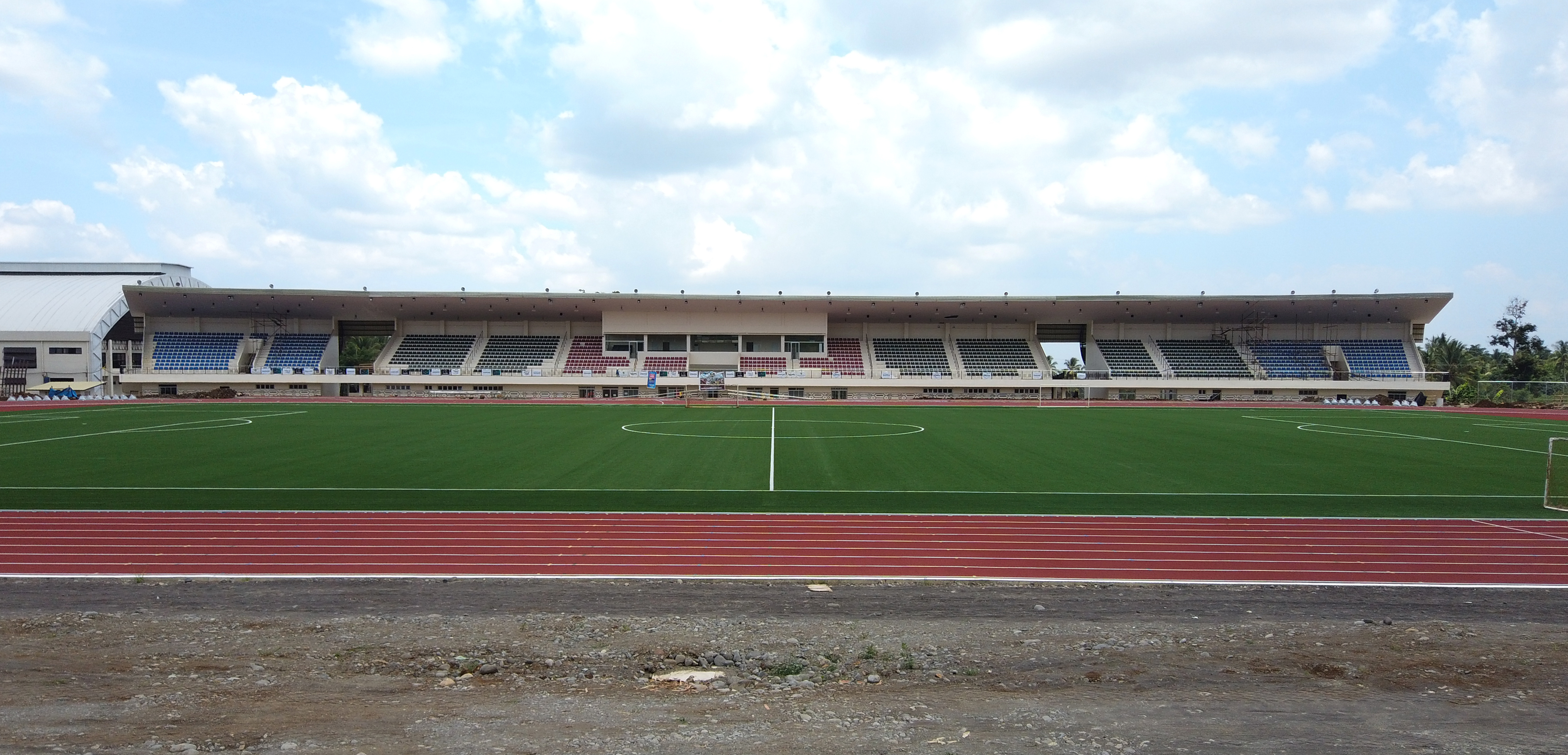
Davao City-UP Sports Complex, the opening ceremony venue of the games

Host Region

Regions
Code	Name	Colors
BARMMAA	Bangsamoro Autonomous Region in Muslim Mindanao	
CARAA	Cordillera Administrative Region	
NCRAA	National Capital Region	
IRAA	Region I or Ilocos Region	
CAVRAA	Region II or Cagayan Valley	
CLRAA	Region III or Central Luzon	
STCAA	Region IV-A or Southern Tagalog - Calabarzon	
MRAA	Region IV-B or Southern Tagalog - Mimaropa	
BRAA	Region V or Bicol Region	
WVRAA	Region VI or Western Visayas	
CVRAA	Region VII Central Visayas	
EVRAA	Region VIII or Eastern Visayas	
ZPRAA	Region IX or Zamboanga Peninsula	
NMRAA	Region X or Northern Mindanao	
DAVRAA	Region XI or Davao Region	
SRAA	Region XII or Soccsksargen	
CARAGARAA	Region XIII or Caraga	

== Medal tally ==
=== Regular sports ===
Rank	Region	Gold	Silver	Bronze	Total
1	National Capital Region (NCRAA)	86	71	56	213
2	Calabarzon (IV-A STCAA)	66	49	73	188
3	Western Visayas (VI-WVRAA)	49	40	58	147
4	Soccsksargen (XII-SRAA)	26	43	40	109
5	Central Visayas (VII-CVIRAA)	24	22	33	79
6	Central Luzon (III-CLRAA)	23	29	33	85
7	Bicol Region (V-BRAA)	23	22	30	75
8	Northern Mindanao (X-NMRAA)	17	27	26	70
9	Ilocos Region (I-R1AA)	16	13	21	50
10	Cordillera Administrative Region (CARAA)	14	13	24	51
11	Davao Region (XI-DavRAA)*	13	22	37	72
12	Caraga (CARAGARAA)	13	10	14	37
13	Eastern Visayas (VIII-EVRAA)	11	8	19	38
14	Cagayan Valley (II-CAVRAA)	6	6	8	20
15	Mimaropa (IV-B MRAA)	4	7	12	23
16	Bangsamoro Autonomous Region (BARMAA)	3	10	6	19
17	Zamboanga Peninsula (IX-ZPRAA)	2	4	21	27
Totals (17 entries)		396	396	511	1,303

Source: Palarong Pambansa 2019 Medal Tally Reporting System

=== Demonstration sports ===
Rank	Region	Gold	Silver	Bronze	Total
1	Central Visayas (VII-CVIRAA)	13	1	5	19
2	National Capital Region (NCRAA)	10	12	5	27
3	Zamboanga Peninsula (IX-ZPRAA)	6	5	0	11
4	Western Visayas (VI-WVRAA)	4	8	8	20
5	Davao Region (XI-DavRAA)*	3	1	0	4
6	Cagayan Valley (II-CAVRAA)	2	0	1	3
7	Calabarzon (IV-A STCAA)	1	4	5	10
8	Bicol Region (V-BRAA)	1	2	0	3
9	Cordillera Administrative Region (CARAA)	1	1	1	3
10	Soccsksargen (XII-SRAA)	0	4	2	6
11	Central Luzon (III-CLRAA)	0	1	3	4
12	Bangsamoro Autonomous Region (BARMAA)	0	1	1	2
13	Ilocos Region (I-R1AA)	0	1	0	1
14	Eastern Visayas (VIII-EVRAA)	0	0	1	1
15	Caraga (CARAGARAA)	0	0	0	0
15	Mimaropa (IV-B MRAA)	0	0	0	0
15	Northern Mindanao (X-NMRAA)	0	0	0	0
Totals (17 entries)		41	41	32	114

Source: Palarong Pambansa 2019 Medal Tally Reporting System

=== Para sports ===
Rank	Region	Gold	Silver	Bronze	Total
1	Calabarzon (IV-A STCAA)	26	5	5	36
2	Western Visayas (VI-WVRAA)	16	20	14	50
3	National Capital Region (NCRAA)	6	2	3	11
4	Ilocos Region (I-R1AA)	5	4	5	14
5	Central Luzon (III-CLRAA)	5	1	6	12
6	Bicol Region (V-BRAA)	4	7	5	16
7	Zamboanga Peninsula (IX-ZPRAA)	3	6	0	9
8	Northern Mindanao (X-NMRAA)	3	3	2	8
9	Bangsamoro Autonomous Region (BARMAA)	3	1	1	5
10	Central Visayas (VII-CVIRAA)	2	3	3	8
11	Caraga (CARAGARAA)	2	0	1	3
12	Cagayan Valley (II-CAVRAA)	1	2	1	4
13	Soccsksargen (XII-SRAA)	1	1	4	6
14	Davao Region (XI-DavRAA)*	0	8	10	18
15	Cordillera Administrative Region (CARAA)	0	1	0	1
16	Eastern Visayas (VIII-EVRAA)	0	0	0	0
16	Mimaropa (IV-B MRAA)	0	0	0	0
Totals (17 entries)		77	64	60	201

Source: Palarong Pambansa 2019 Medal Tally Reporting System
