= 2018 in the Philippines =

- Decades: 1990s; 2000s; 2010s; 2020s
- See also: List of years in the Philippines; films; music; television; sports

2018 in the Philippines details events of note that happened in the Philippines in 2018.

== Incumbents ==
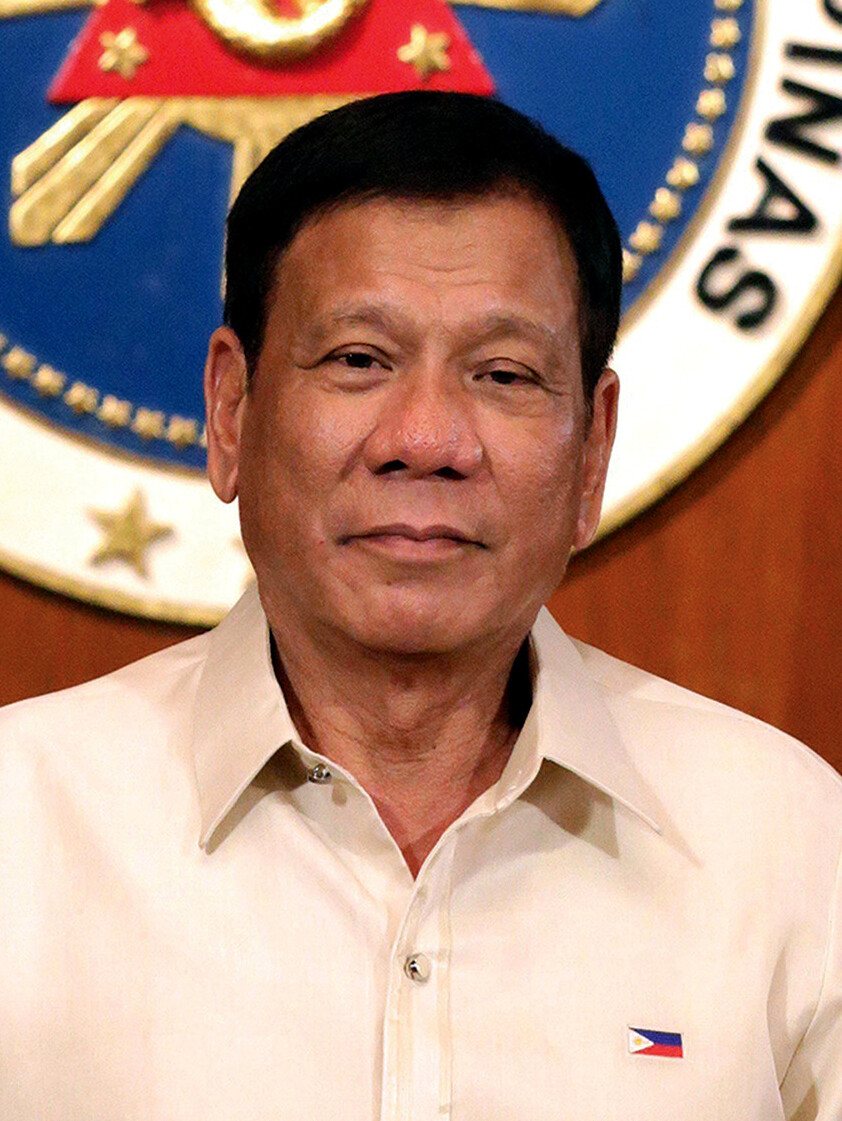
Rodrigo R.
Duterte

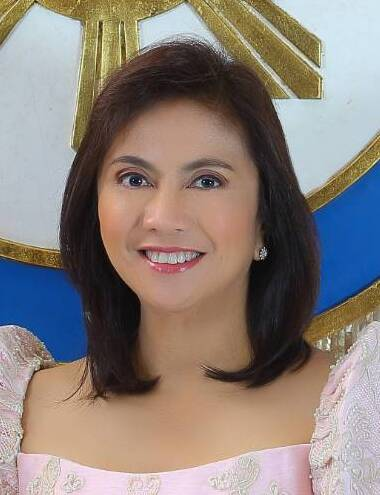
Leni G.
Robredo

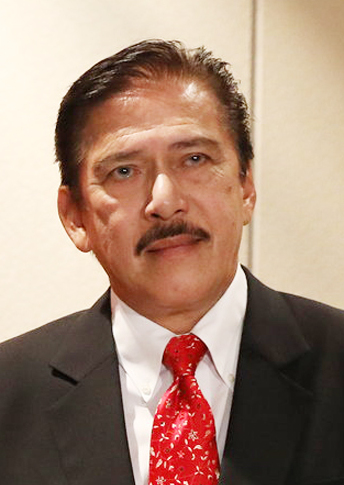
Vicente C.
Sotto III

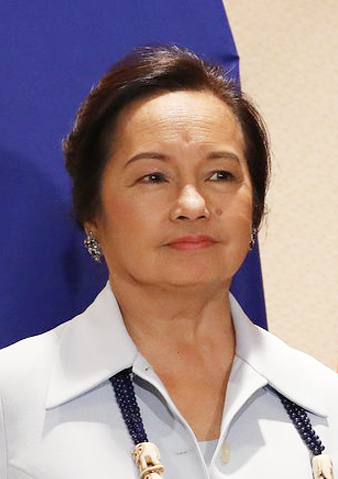
Gloria M.
Macapagal-Arroyo

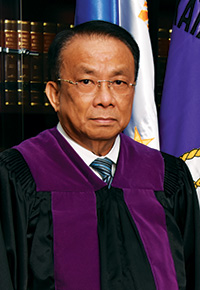
Lucas P.
Bersamin

- President: Rodrigo Duterte (PDP–Laban)
- Vice President: Leni Robredo (Liberal)
- Congress (17th):
  - Senate President:
    - Aquilino Pimentel III (PDP–Laban) (until May 21)
    - Tito Sotto (NPC) (from May 21)
  - House Speaker:
    - Pantaleon Alvarez (PDP–Laban) (until July 23)
    - Gloria Macapagal Arroyo (PDP–Laban) (from July 23)
- Chief Justice:
  - Maria Lourdes Sereno (until May 11)
  - Antonio Carpio (acting) (May 14 – August 25); (October 11 – November 28)
  - Teresita De Castro (August 28 – October 10)
  - Lucas Bersamin (from November 28)

== Events ==
=== January ===
- January 1 – Republic Act No. 10963, widely known as the Tax Reform for Acceleration and Inclusion Law (TRAIN Law), takes effect.
- January 5 – Former Palawan Governor Joel Reyes is released from detention after the Court of Appeals resolved in his favor a petition in connection with his murder case for the killing of broadcaster Dr. Gerry Ortega in 2011.
- January 22 – Mayon Volcano's alert status is raised to Alert Level 4 due to intensified volcanic activities. The day before, the volcano shoots 200 m (660 ft) to 500 m (1,600 ft) to the air and generated ash plumes that reached 1.3 km (0.81 mi) above the summit. The province of Albay declares a state of calamity days earlier on January 16 due to continuous volcanic activity.
- January 23 – The Supreme Court approves the funding for the ₱3.8-billion Motor Vehicle License Plate Standardization Program (MVPSP), clearing the way for the release to motorists of 700,000 license plates turned over by the Bureau of Customs (BOC) to the Land Transportation Office (LTO) as constitutional.
- January 25 – Police Officer 3 Carlos Baccali Bocaig, a survivor of the 2015 Mamasapano firefight, dies from a grenade explosion during a fireworks display in La Paz, Abra on the third anniversary of the clash.
- January 29 – The Office of the President orders a 90-day preventive suspension order against Overall Deputy Ombudsman Melchor Arthur Carandang for alleged grave misconduct and grave dishonesty for the unauthorized disclosures of the alleged bank transactions of President Rodrigo Duterte and his family.
- January 31:
  - A total lunar eclipse coinciding with a supermoon and blue moon phenomenon is witnessed by many astronomers and skywatchers throughout the country.
  - Rafael Baylosis, a peace consultant of the National Democratic Front of the Philippines (NDFP), together with his companion, are arrested in Quezon City.

=== February ===
- February 2 – President Duterte signs Republic Act No. 10969 or the Free Irrigation Service Act, a law that waives irrigation fees for farmers who own 8 hectares of land or less.
- February 6 – The Supreme Court upholds the constitutionality of the year-long extension of martial law in Mindanao in December 2017.
- February 7 – The Supreme Court orders a halt on court proceedings on graft and usurpation of authority cases filed against former President Benigno Aquino III at the Sandiganbayan for his alleged role in the 2015 Mamasapano raid that killed 44 SAF troopers.
- February 12:
  - The Philippine Government signs an administrative order to completely ban the deployment of all workers to Kuwait. Following the February 9 confirmation of the death of a Filipina domestic worker in the gulf country allegedly due to abuse.
  - Ombudsman Conchita Carpio-Morales orders the dismissal from service of former Cebu governor and incumbent 3rd District Representative Gwendolyn Garcia for grave misconduct in connection with the purchase of a sprawling property for close to P100 million.
- February 19 – The Senate committee on national defense and security begins its probe on the P15.5 billion-Frigate Acquisition Project (FAP) of the Philippine Navy with Special Assistant to the President Christopher "Bong" Go in attendance and several Cabinet members present to support him.
- February 26:
  - The Senate orders the arrest of former Commission on Elections (COMELEC) chair Andres Bautista over his non-attendance of a probe into his alleged ill-gotten wealth.
  - Former president Benigno Aquino III and former budget secretary Butch Abad face a House investigation into their administration's deployment of Dengvaxia, a dengue vaccine, that was then at the center of a health scare.
- February 28 – The United States Department of State adds seven organizations, including the Maute group, to its list of foreign terrorists and terrorist organizations due to their connection to the Islamic State.

=== March ===
- March 1 – President Duterte signs Republic Act No. 10973, restoring the power of select officials of the Philippine National Police (PNP) to issue subpoenas on cases under investigation.
- March 8:
  - Voted 38–2, the House Committee on Justice finds probable cause in the impeachment complaint against Chief Justice Maria Lourdes Sereno.
  - The Department of Justice (DOJ) indicts 11 members of the Aegis Juris fraternity over the fatal hazing of University of Santo Tomas law freshman student Horacio "Atio" Castillo III in September 2017.
- March 9 – Former Vice President Jejomar Binay and his son, former Makati mayor Jejomar Binay Jr., are charged at the Sandiganbayan over the alleged anomalous procurement process in the construction of the Makati Science High School.
- March 12:
  - The Senate Blue Ribbon Committee orders the release of former Customs commissioner Nicanor Faeldon after he promises to Senator Richard Gordon that he will no longer engage in backtalking and will heed Senate summons.
  - The Department of Justice cleared alleged drug lords Kerwin Espinosa, Peter Lim, and 20 others of charges related to the narcotics trade due to lack of evidence.
- March 14 – President Duterte announces that the Philippines is withdrawing from the International Criminal Court (ICC), which was looking into whether it has jurisdiction to probe allegations of state sanctioned killings in his war on drugs. The Philippines issued a formal notification of its withdrawal from the Roman Statute, which was received by the Secretary-General of the United Nations on March 17. The effectivity date of the withdrawal shall be exactly one year from receipt of the notification.
- March 17—A Piper PA-23 passenger aircraft bound for Laoag International Airport in Ilocos Norte crashes upon take off from Plaridel Airport in Bulacan, killing all five people on board as well as five on the ground.
- March 26 – The Bangko Sentral ng Pilipinas announced the release of new peso coins and their designs.

=== April ===
- April 2 – The Supreme Court, sitting as the Presidential Electoral Tribunal (PET), begins the manual recount of votes for the election protest of former Senator Bongbong Marcos against Vice President Leni Robredo. The recount to validate the results of the 2016 vice presidential election commenced with the counting of votes cast in Marcos' pilot provinces of Camarines Sur, Iloilo, and Negros Oriental.
- April 26 – Boracay closes to tourists for six months and undergoes rehabilitation. The closure is officially announced on April 4. Checkpoints staffed by police officers and soldiers are set up at piers in Boracay to turn away visitors from the island. Passes are given to residents of Boracay.

=== May ===
- May 11 – The Supreme Court votes 8–6 to grant a quo warranto petition by the Solicitor General against Chief Justice Maria Lourdes Sereno, removing her from office for violating requirements on the Statement of Assets, Liabilities, and Net Worth.
- May 14 – The Barangay and Sangguiang Kabataan elections are held.
- May 18 – The National Museum of Natural History is opened to the public.
- May 30 – President Duterte declares his plan to make the entire island of Boracay a land reform area, saying that he wants to prioritize Boracay's first inhabitants. Duterte adds that his Cabinet and Congress may conduct a study on the possibility of putting up "only a small area for tourism" in Boracay and the majority of the island for land reform.

=== June ===
- June 23 – Diwata-2, the second microsatellite under the Philippine Scientific Earth Observation Microsatellite program, is deployed to space.
- June 29 – President Duterte signs Republic Act No. 11053 or the Anti-Hazing Act of 2018, that bans hazing in all forms and imposes higher penalties for those convicted of hazing.

=== July ===
- July 2:
  - Controversial Tanauan, Batangas mayor Antonio Halili is assassinated by an unknown sniper during a flag-raising ceremony, and becomes the 11th local government official to be killed in the Philippine drug war.
  - The Philippine Coast Guard detains cruise ship MV Forever Lucky in Bataan on suspicion of involvement in human trafficking. The NBI rescues 139 alleged victims from the vessel and charges Johnny Cabrera, the alleged lessor of the ship.
- July 4 – The AFP clashes with militants from the ISIL-affiliated Bangsamoro Islamic Freedom Fighters (BIFF), in Maguindanao after the latter attempt to occupy a town center. After 12 hours, the BIFF withdraws to the hills, leaving four militants dead, while two militants, a government soldier and a militiaman are wounded.

=== August ===
- August 10 – Maya-1, the first Filipino nanosatellite, is deployed from the International Space Station.
- August 16 – A passenger aircraft, a Boeing 737-800 operating as Xiamen Airlines Flight 8667, crashes at Ninoy Aquino International Airport (NAIA) in Metro Manila, skidding off the runway while attempting to land. All 157 passengers and eight crew members evacuate the aircraft. However, numerous flights at NAIA are delayed or diverted.
- August 25 – Teresita De Castro is appointed by President Duterte as the Chief Justice of the Supreme Court, following the ouster of the Maria Lourdes Sereno via quo warranto, making her, according to de Castro, "technically" the first female Chief Justice. She takes office on August 28.
- August 28 – A bomb blast kills three and injures more than 30 others during the celebration of the Hamungaya Festival in Isulan, Sultan Kudarat.
- August 31 – President Duterte signs Proclamation No. 572, voiding the amnesty of opposition Senator Antonio Trillanes IV for supposed failure to "fulfill all the necessary requirements."

=== September ===
- September 2 – A bomb blast in Isulan, Sultan Kudarat, kills two and injures 12. The attack is blamed on the BIFF.
- September 17:
  - President Duterte repeats his call to shut all mines in the country following deadly landslides, hours after Environment and Natural Resources Secretary Roy Cimatu orders all mining to be stopped in the Cordillera region.
  - Typhoon Mangkhut triggers a landslide in Itogon, Benguet, killing more than 40. The total death toll of the typhoon includes at least 81 people and at least 59 others are recorded missing.
  - Former Army general and politician Jovito Palparan is convicted for the kidnapping and disappearance of students Sherlyn Cadapan and Karen Empeño. He and two other associates are sentenced to life imprisonment.
- September 20 – A landslide occurs in Naga, Cebu, killing at least 53 people.

=== October ===
- October 20 – Nine sugarcane workers are fatally shot inside a hacienda in Sagay, Negros Occidental.

=== November ===
- November 9 – The Sandiganbayan convicts former First Lady and Ilocos Norte 2nd district representative Imelda Marcos of seven counts of graft, sentencing her to 6–11 years in jail for each count, in connection with the bank transfers to Swiss foundations during her term as governor of Metro Manila.
- November 20–21 – Chinese President Xi Jinping holds a state visit in the country.

=== December ===
- December 7 – The Sandiganbayan acquits former Senator Bong Revilla of plunder in connection to the Priority Development Assistance Fund scam.
- December 11 – The Balangiga bells, which had been taken by the United States Army from Balangiga, Eastern Samar in 1901 as war trophies during the Philippine–American War, arrive at Villamor Air Base in Pasay after 117 years of U.S. possession.
- December 12 – Congress approves President Duterte's request for martial law extension in Mindanao until 2019.
- December 14 – Four Hong Kong nationals are sentenced to life in prison by a Philippine court for possession of half a kilogram of illegal drugs. There are complaints and doubts about the fairness of the convictions as well as the proportionality between the alleged quantity of the drugs and the jail terms.
- December 31 – An improvised explosive device explodes outside the South Seas Mall in Cotabato City, killing two and injuring 11.

== Holidays ==
On July 17, 2017, the government announced at least 18 Philippine holidays for 2018 as declared by virtue of Proclamation No. 269, series of 2017.

=== Regular ===
- January 1 – New Year's Day
- March 29 – Maundy Thursday
- March 30 – Good Friday
- April 9 – Araw ng Kagitingan (Day of Valor)
- May 1 – Labor Day
- June 12 – Independence Day
- June 15 – Eid'l Fitr (Feast of Ramadan)
- August 21 – Eid'l Adha (Feast of Sacrifice)
- August 27 – National Heroes Day
- November 30 – Bonifacio Day
- December 25 – Christmas Day
- December 30 – Rizal Day

=== Special (Non-working) ===
In addition, several other places observe local holidays, such as the foundation of their town. These are also "special days."

- February 16 – Chinese New Year
- February 25 – 1986 EDSA Revolution
- March 31 – Black Saturday
- August 21 – Ninoy Aquino Day
- November 1 – All Saints Day
- November 2 – Special non-working holiday
- December 8 – Feast of the Immaculate Conception
- December 24 – Special non-working holiday
- December 31 – Last day of the year (in observance of New Year's celebrations)

== Health ==
- November 29–December 9 – At least 21 people die after reportedly drinking arrack (locally known as lambanog) in Laguna and other neighboring provinces. The Food and Drug Administration found the high levels of methanol in the samples of arrack.

== Sports ==
- January 25, Basketball – The inauguration of the Maharlika Pilipinas Basketball League are held at the Smart Araneta Coliseum in Quezon City.
- February 3, Boxing – Jerwin Ancajas knocks out Mexico's Israel "Jiga" González in the 10th round to retain the International Boxing Federation junior bantamweight crown at the American Bank Center in Corpus Christi, Texas.
- February 9–25, Multi-sport – Two athletes represent the Philippines at the 2018 Winter Olympics held in Pyeongchang, South Korea. Asa Miller competes at the alpine skiing – men's giant slalom event while Michael Christian Martinez, who previously represented the Philippines at the 2014 Winter Olympics, competes at the figure skating – men' singles event.
- February 23 – The Philippine Olympic Committee holds elections for the post of President and chairman after the 2016 elections results were declared null and void by the Pasig Regional Trial Court. The court requires Ricky Vargas and Cavite congressman Abraham Tolentino to be candidates for the post of President and chairman respectively. Vargas and Tolentino eventually won over incumbents Peping Cojuangco and Ting Ledesma.
- March 27, Association football – The Philippines national team secures qualification for the 2019 AFC Asian Cup—the team's first appearance in the tournament—after defeating Tajikistan 2–1 at the Rizal Memorial Stadium.
- April 3–8, Ice hockey – The Philippines hosts its first International Ice Hockey Federation-sanctioned event, the top division of the 2018 IIHF Challenge Cup of Asia at the SM Mall of Asia ice skating rink in Pasay, Metro Manila. Mongolia emerges as champions with Thailand finishing in second place. The Philippines finishes third in the tournament, despite tying in points with Mongolia and Thailand, due to head-to-head results.
- April 6, Basketball – The San Miguel Beermen claims the 2017–18 PBA Philippine Cup title, their eighth PBA Philippine Cup title, after defeating the Magnolia Hotshots in 2OT, 4–1 in the finals. Center June Mar Fajardo is named the PBA Finals MVP.
- May 3:
  - Volleyball—The De La Salle University (DLSU) Lady Spikers wins their 11th championship title, 3rd consecutive title in UAAP Season 80 against the Far Eastern University (FEU) Lady Tamaraws in three straight sets: 26–24, 25–20, and 26–24. Lady Spikers libero Dawn Macandili is named the season's MVP, best scorer, best server, and the finals' MVP of the season.
  - Basketball—The San Miguel Alab Pilipinas pull off a rare five-game sweep after outclassing Mono Vampire, 102–92, in the 2018 ABL finals at the Santa Rosa Sports Complex in Santa Rosa, Laguna.
- May 19–21, Multi-sport – The 2018 Philippine National Games take place in Cebu City and various cities and towns across the Cebu province.
- June 8–12, 3x3 basketball – The 2018 FIBA 3x3 World Cup take place at the Philippine Arena in Bocaue, Bulacan.
- July 2, Basketball – A bench-clearing brawl between the Australia and the Philippines men's national basketball teams take place during the 2019 FIBA Basketball World Cup qualifier at the Philippine Arena in Bocaue. Four Australian players and nine Filipino players were suspended, Philippines head coach Chot Reyes and assistant coach Jong Uichico are sanctioned, while the Australian and Philippine national federations are fined by FIBA. The match is eventually abandoned in the third quarter with Australia winning by default due to lack of eligible Filipino players.
- July 25, Association football – Ceres–Negros wins their second consecutive Philippines Football League title with three games to spare, following their 6–1 victory over Global Cebu in the 22nd round.
- August 11, Association football – Philippines national team goalkeeper Neil Etheridge is the first Filipino (and first Southeast Asian) to play in the Premier League, the highest division in English football, as he plays in his club Cardiff City's first match in the league's season. The Philippines becomes the 113th nationality represented in the league.
- August 18–September 2, Multi-sport – The Philippines send a delegation of 272 athletes in 31 sports to compete at the 2018 Asian Games in Jakarta and Palembang, Indonesia. The Philippines place 19th overall in the medal tally of the games with 21 medals won, including four gold medals from weightlifter Hidilyn Diaz in the women's 53 kg event; golfers Yuka Saso, Bianca Pagdanganan, and Lois Kaye Go in the women's team event (as well as one other from Saso in the women's individual event); and skateboarder Margielyn Didal in the women's street event.
- September 1–October 27, Association football – The inaugural staging of the Copa Paulino Alcantara—the Philippines' domestic football cup competition—is held. Kaya–Iloilo wins the tournament, after defeating Davao Aguilas 1–0 in the final.
- November 13–December 6, Association football – The Philippines national team co-hosts the 2018 AFF Championship. The Philippines finished second in Group B, but lost to eventual champions Vietnam on 4–2 aggregate in the semi-finals.

== Entertainment and culture ==
- January 11 – The Securities and Exchange Commission revokes the certification of incorporation it issued to Rappler, Inc. after it found the issuance of the media firm of Philippine Depositary Receipts to Omidyar Network to be in violation of the Constitution's provisions on foreign ownership saying that Rappler "sold control" to foreigners.
- January 17 – Following the Securities and Exchange Commission of the Philippines' revocation of Rappler's license, the National Bureau of Investigation of the Philippines launches a probe into Rappler.
- January 24 – Miss Philippines Katarina Rodriguez wins the 1st runner-up in the Miss Intercontinental 2017 pageant which was held in SUNRISE Garden Beach Resort in Hurghada, Egypt.
- February 24 – The Philippines has breached the world record for the largest art lesson conducted in a single day, with a total of 16,692 participants in a 45-minute art lesson held at the Quezon Memorial Circle in Diliman, Quezon City, that surpassing one posted by India with 14,135 people in 2014.
- February 26 – Miss Philippines Sophia Senoron was crowned as the first winner of the Miss Multinational 2018 pageant night, which was held in New Delhi, India.
- February 27 – The La Purisima Concepcion de la Virgen Maria or the Baclayon Church, which is among the heritage churches were destroyed after the magnitude 7.2 earthquake in 2013, was reopened to the public with a fully restored interior.
- March 3 – The 3 letters of Andrés Bonifacio to Emilio Jacinto, that narrating the massive cheating in the Philippines' first election, known as the Tejeros Convention held on March 22, 1897, together with the paintings of Jose T. Joya, Fernando Zobel, Vicente Manansala and Fernando Amorsolo were sold in an auction which was held in León Gallery in Makati.
- March 8 – The Asian Institute of Management (AIM) has launched ACCeSs@AIM, the first data science corporate laboratory in the Philippines.
- March 18 – Catriona Gray, a Filipino-Australian model, was crowned as Miss Universe Philippines 2018 during the coronation night of the Binibining Pilipinas 2018 at the Smart Araneta Coliseum in Quezon City.
- April 30 – The Department of Tourism receives their ₱60,000,000 ad placement given to government-owned People's Television Network for airing it on Ben Tulfo's program Kilos Pronto produced by Bitag Media Unilimted, Inc. (in which the blocktimer sells its production time to the network); the contract was not supported with proper documents such as the Memorandum of Agreement and Certificate of Performance contrary to Section 4 of Presidential Decree 1445 and COA Circular No. 2012-001. An investigation on the alleged advertisement anomaly is being conducted by Malacanang, Tourism secretary Wanda Tulfo Teo said that Ben along with his brother Erwin Tulfo will return its ₱60 million ad placement from DOT to prove there was no anomaly in the advertisement deal and there was no conflict on the deal because it was a government-to-government deal between the DOT and PTV. Teo was later resigned on May 8 because of the controversy.

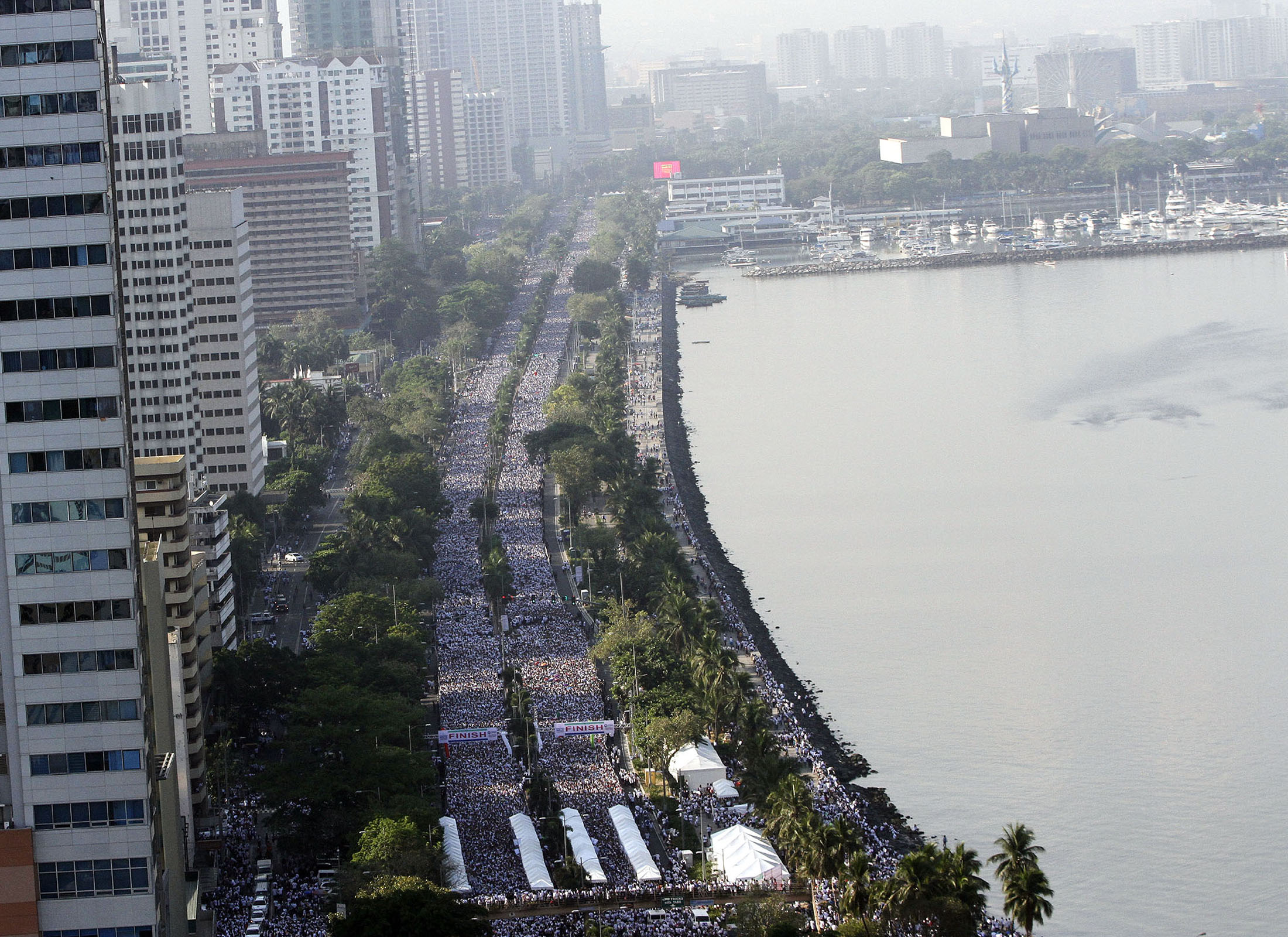
INC members participate in the charity walk, "Worldwide Walk to Fight Poverty", in Manila.

- May 6 – More than 1.5 million members join the Iglesia ni Cristo's (INC) Worldwide Walk to Fight Poverty along Roxas Boulevard and in selected sites around the Philippines and abroad to successfully break the Guinness World Records for the largest human sentence, largest charity walk in a single venue and largest charity walk in multiple venues in 24 hours.
- July 27–29 – The fourth installment of Asia Pop Comic Convention was held on SMX Convention Center, Pasay, Manila which was attended by international stars, Tye Sheridan, Osric Chau, Finn Jones, Mike Colter and Mustafa Shakir.
- September 16—Sharifa Akeel of Sultan Kudarat is a Muslim Maguindanaoan crowned as Mutya ng Pilipinas-Asia Pacific International 2018 during the coronation night held at the Mall of Asia Arena in Pasay.
- December 17 – Miss Philippines Catriona Gray is crowned Miss Universe 2018, which was held in Bangkok, Thailand.

== Deaths ==
January

- January 14 – Spanky Manikan (b. 1942), actor
- January 15 – Pitoy Moreno (b. 1925), fashion designer
- January 27 – Maryo J. de los Reyes (b. 1952), director
- January 30 – Joaquín Rojas (b. 1938), Olympic basketball player

February

- February 16 – Napoleon Abueva, (b. 1930), sculptor and National Artist
- February 23 – Jesus Varela (b. 1927) Roman Catholic prelate, Bishop of Sorsogon (1980–2003)
- February 25 – Danny Florencio (b. 1947) basketball player

March

- March 7 – Fortunato Abat (b. 1925), former general and Secretary of the Department of National Defense
- March 8 – Bernardo Bernardo (b. 1945), actor
- March 15 – Rolly Quizon (b. 1959), actor (John en Marsha)
- March 24 – Mely Tagasa (b. 1935), actress and comedian
- March 26 – Roque Ablan Jr. (b. 1932), former congressman of the First District of Ilocos Norte

April

- April 12:
  - Nestor Mata (b. 1926), former journalist and lone survivor of the 1957 Cebu plane crash
  - Oliver Lozano (b. 1940), former legal counsel of the late Ferdinand Marcos
- April 19 – Zacharias Jimenez (b. 1948), Roman Catholic prelate, Bishop of Pagadian (1994–2003) and Auxiliary Bishop of Butuan (2003–2009)

May

- May 6 – Cirilo Bautista (b. 1941), writer, poet and National Artist
- May 8 – Edgardo B. Maranan (b. 1946), poet, essayist, fiction writer, playwright, translator and writer of children's stories
- May 11 – Jose Francisco Oliveros (b. 1946), Roman Catholic prelate and Bishop of Malolos (2004–2018)
- May 12 – Eufranio Eriguel (b. 1959), former Congressman of the Second District of La Union
- May 13 – Edgardo Angara (b. 1934), former senator
- May 21 – Camilo Diaz Gregorio, (b. 1939), Roman Catholic prelate, Bishop of Bacolod (1989–2000) and Prelate of Batanes (2003–2017).

June

- June 11 – Roilo Golez, (b. 1947), former Congressman of Parañaque City's 2nd District

July

- July 2 – Antonio Halili, (b. 1946), Mayor of Tanauan
- July 4 – Rogelio Mangahas, (b. 1939) poet and writer.
- July 25 – Ricardo C. Puno, (b. 1923), lawyer, Minister of Justice (1979–1984).
- July 30 – Carmen Guerrero Nakpil, (b. 1922), author and historian.
- July 31 – Jose Apolinario Lozada, (b. 1950), diplomat and former Congressman of the Fifth District of Negros Occidental

August

- August 22 – Joey Mente (b. 1976) basketball player.

September

- September 1 – Vicente dela Serna, (b. 1952), former governor of Cebu
- September 2 – Ian Lariba, (b. 1994), table tennis player
- September 23 – Ciriaco Calalang, (b. 1951), politician

October

- October 30 – Rico J. Puno, (b. 1953) Filipino singer, comedian, actor and television host

November

- November 28 – Hermogenes Concepcion Jr. (b. 1920), Associate Justice of the Supreme Court of the Philippines (1975–1978)

December

- December 9 – Alona Alegre (b. 1948), actress
- December 14 – Gilberto Duavit Sr. (b. 1934), chairman, GMA Network
- December 22 – Rodel Batocabe (b. 1966), Ako Bicol Representative
- December 25 – Vicente Pimentel Jr., Governor of Surigao del Sur (2001–2010, 2016–2018)

== See also ==
- List of years in the Philippines
- Timeline of Philippine history
