= Nieves Confesor =

Filipino politician and academic

Secretary of Labor and Employment
- In office February 12, 1992 – June 30, 1995
- President: Corazon Aquino; Fidel V. Ramos
- Preceded by: Ruben D. Torres
- Succeeded by: Jose S. Brillantes

Personal details
- Education: Miriam College (BA); Ateneo de Manila University (MBA); Harvard Kennedy School (MPPA)

Maria Nieves R. Confesor, commonly known as Nieves Confesor, is the former Executive Director of the Asian Institute of Management (AIM) TeaM Energy Center for Bridging Leadership, a private educational institution based in the Philippines.

She was the first woman to assume the position of Dean at AIM since the Institute's foundation in 1968.

== Education ==
Confesor earned a Bachelor of Arts in Literary Studies, magna cum laude and class valedictorian from Maryknoll College (now Miriam College) in 1971. She obtained a Master of Business Administration from the Ateneo Graduate School of Business of the Ateneo de Manila University in 1978.

She earned a Master of Public Policy and Administration degree from the John F. Kennedy School of Government of Harvard University, as an Edward S. Mason Fellow, in 1990. She also took special courses in Labor and Employment and in Asian Studies at the University of the Philippines; and in International Economics, Negotiations, Women in Politics at Harvard University.

== Academe ==
Confesor was a professor of Business Administration and International Studies at Miriam College (formerly Maryknoll), and professor of Public Policy and Administration at the Development Academy of the Philippines.

She was granted fellowships by the ILO for Research Policy and Program Planning; Working Conditions and Enforcement of Labor Standards; Work Organization, Job Satisfaction and Industrial Democracy.

== Government service ==
Confesor was the first Filipino and Asian woman to serve as Chairperson of the International Labour Organization (ILO) Governing Body from 1994 to 1995.

She served as chairperson of a panel of seven experts to the Joint Congressional Commission to amend the 1974 Labor Code as well as one of six ILO Declaration experts-advisers to the ILO Governing Body.

In late 2001, she served as vice-chairperson of the ILO Assessment Team sent to Myanmar in relation to the country’s violations of the Convention on the Abolition of Forced Labour. She continues to participate in the UN network of Conflict: Early Warning and Preventive Measures (EWPM) project activities; and ASEAN labor and employment activities.

She is also a member of the Operating Council of the Global Alliance for Workers based in Washington D.C., USA, and provides advice on the programs being put in place in Thailand, Indonesia, Vietnam, and China for workers especially in factories supplying global companies.

She served as presidential adviser on Human Resource Development and International Labor Affairs to former Philippine President Fidel V. Ramos, with the personal rank of Ambassador Extraordinary and Plenipotentiary.

She was, until her retirement in 1995, the Philippine Secretary for Labor and Employment. In this capacity, she concurrently served as: Chairperson of tripartite bodies/agencies such as the National Wages and Productivity Commission, the Overseas Workers Welfare Administration, the Philippine Overseas Employment Administration, the Technical Education and Skills Development Authority; Board director/member of the Philippine Agrarian Reform Commission, the Social Security System and the Land Bank of the Philippines.

== Consultancy ==
Confesor has served on the boards of the Philippine National Bank, the Philippine National Oil Company and the Philippine National Coal Corporation.

She was consultant for labor and employment to the newly formed Autonomous Region of Muslim Mindanao and on the rehabilitation program for the once war-ravaged areas.

She has served as officer and member of various national and international organizations involved in women and development work, training and education.

== Work at AIM ==
Confesor is a core faculty member of the Center for Development Management (CDM) and teaches in the Master in Management (MM) Program of the Washington SyCip Graduate School of Business (WSGSB) and in the Executive Education and Lifelong Learning Center (EXCELL).

Confesor was a former director of the Human Resource Productivity Desk of the AIM Policy Center. Her academic and professional competencies include: public policy development and analysis, public administration, women in development, employment planning and service administration, labor-management relations, skills development planning and administration, working conditions and productivity, workers' welfare programs, human resources development, general management, and conflict resolution and negotiations.

== Professional awards ==
In 1992, Confesor was named one of the Ten Outstanding Women in the Nation’s Service (TOWNS) and received the Outstanding Service Award by the Philippine Civil Service Commission.

== Criticism ==
Confesor was hugely criticized as a Philippine Labor Secretary in 1995 when two overseas Filipino workers in Singapore died without clarity and legal justice—Flor Contemplacion was convicted by death sentence for allegedly killing Delia Maga, another Filipino.

Confesor failed to address the situation. She resigned and was immediately replaced in her cabinet post.
