= Albino SyCip =

Chinese Filipino financier of Fujianese origin

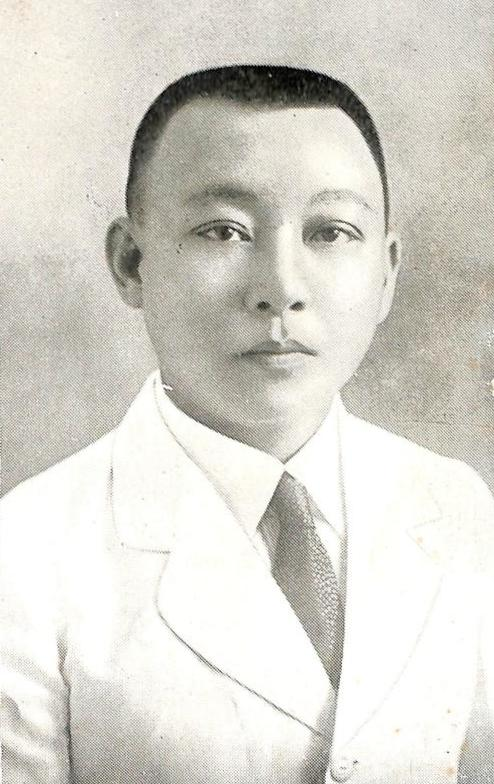
Photo of SyCip published in 1930

Albino Z. SyCip (last name also spelled as Sycip) (Chinese: 薛敏佬; Pe̍h-ōe-jī: Sih Bín-láu; pinyin: Xuē Mǐnlǎo; c. 1888 – May 2, 1978) was a Chinese Filipino financier of Fujianese origin. He was known as the "Dean of Philippine Banking". He earned his law degree from the University of Michigan School of Law in Ann Arbor, Michigan.

The son of immigrants from Fujian province, China, SyCip co-founded Chinabank, establishing branches in Amoy and Shanghai, China. He was also one of the original incorporators of the Philippine Rural Reconstruction Movement.

His sons were:

- David SyCip - businessman, co-founder of RFM Corporation
- Washington SyCip - founder of SyCip Gorres Velayo & Co., one of the largest accounting firms in Asia.
- Alexander SyCip - founder of SyCip Salazar Hernandez & Gatmaitan, the largest and leading law firm in the Philippines.
