= 2018 in Philippine sports =

The following is a list of notable events and developments that are related to Philippine sports in 2018.

== Events ==
=== Athletics ===
- December 9 — The 42nd National Milo Marathon National Finals to be held in Laoag City

=== Basketball ===
==== 3x3 ====
- June 8–12 – The 2018 FIBA 3x3 World Cup was hosted at the Philippine Arena in Bocaue, Bulacan.

==== Professional ====
- January 25 – The inauguration of the Maharlika Pilipinas Basketball League were held at the Smart Araneta Coliseum in Quezon City.
- March 12 – The Senate Defenders bagged the first championship title of the UNTV Cup Season 6 after they won against Malacañang-PSC Kamao in the Game 2 of the Finals series at Smart Araneta Coliseum, Quezon City, 84–64. Senate Defenders won the ₱4 million cash prize for their chosen beneficiary
- April 6 – The San Miguel Beermen claims the 2017–18 PBA Philippine Cup title after beating the Magnolia Hotshots in 2OT, 4–1 in the Finals. and June Mar Fajardo named as PBA Finals MVP.
- April 19 – The Batangas Tanduay Athletics defeat the Muntinlupa Cagers, 68–66, in Game 4 of the 2018 MPBL Anta Rajah Cup Finals, also to win the series, 3–1, to be crowned as the league's first inaugural champions.
- May 3 – The San Miguel Alab Pilipinas pulled off a rare five-game sweep after outclassing Mono Vampire, 102–92, in the 2018 ABL finals at Sta. Rosa Multi-Purpose Complex, Santa Rosa, Laguna.
- May 28 – NLEX rookie Kiefer Ravena has been suspended by FIBA for 18 months after he shockingly tested positive for three banned substances.
- June 12 – The 2018–19 MPBL Datu Cup officially opens at the Smart Araneta Coliseum, in Quezon City. 26 teams including sixteen new expansion teams will compete in the tournament.
- August 8 – The Barangay Ginebra San Miguel were crowned as the champions of the 2018 PBA Commissioner's Cup Finals after beating San Miguel Beermen in the Game 6 of the finals series, 93–77. Scottie Thompson was crowned as the Finals MVP
- August 25 – The Inauguration of the National Basketball League, an amateur basketball league was opened.
- December 8 – The Parañaque Aces defeat the Dasmariñas Ballers Club, in Game 2 of the NBL Finals, also win the series, 2–0, to be crowned as the first inaugural champions.
- December 16 – CJ Perez from LPU Pirates, was picked as the first overall selection from the Columbian Dyip in the 2018 PBA Rookie Draft at the Robinsons Place Manila.
- December 19 — the Magnolia Hotshots defeat the Alaska Aces in six games to win the 2018 PBA Governors' Cup title. Mark Barroca was named finals MVP

==== Collegiate ====
- March 2 – The Ateneo Blue Eaglets won their second championship in 3 years in the UAAP Season 80 Junior's Basketball. The Finals MVP was Kai Zachary Sotto and the Blue Eaglets won their school's 19th UAAP juniors title.
- November 12 – The San Beda Red Lions are the kings of NCAA men's seniors basketball for the third straight year after defeating Lyceum Pirates in Game 2, 71–56, at the Mall of Asia Arena in Pasay.
- December 5 – The Ateneo Blue Eagles were crowned the UAAP Season 81 men's basketball champions after clinching a 99–81 against the UP Fighting Maroons in a Game 2 for the 2nd straight title at the Smart Araneta Coliseum.

==== National team ====
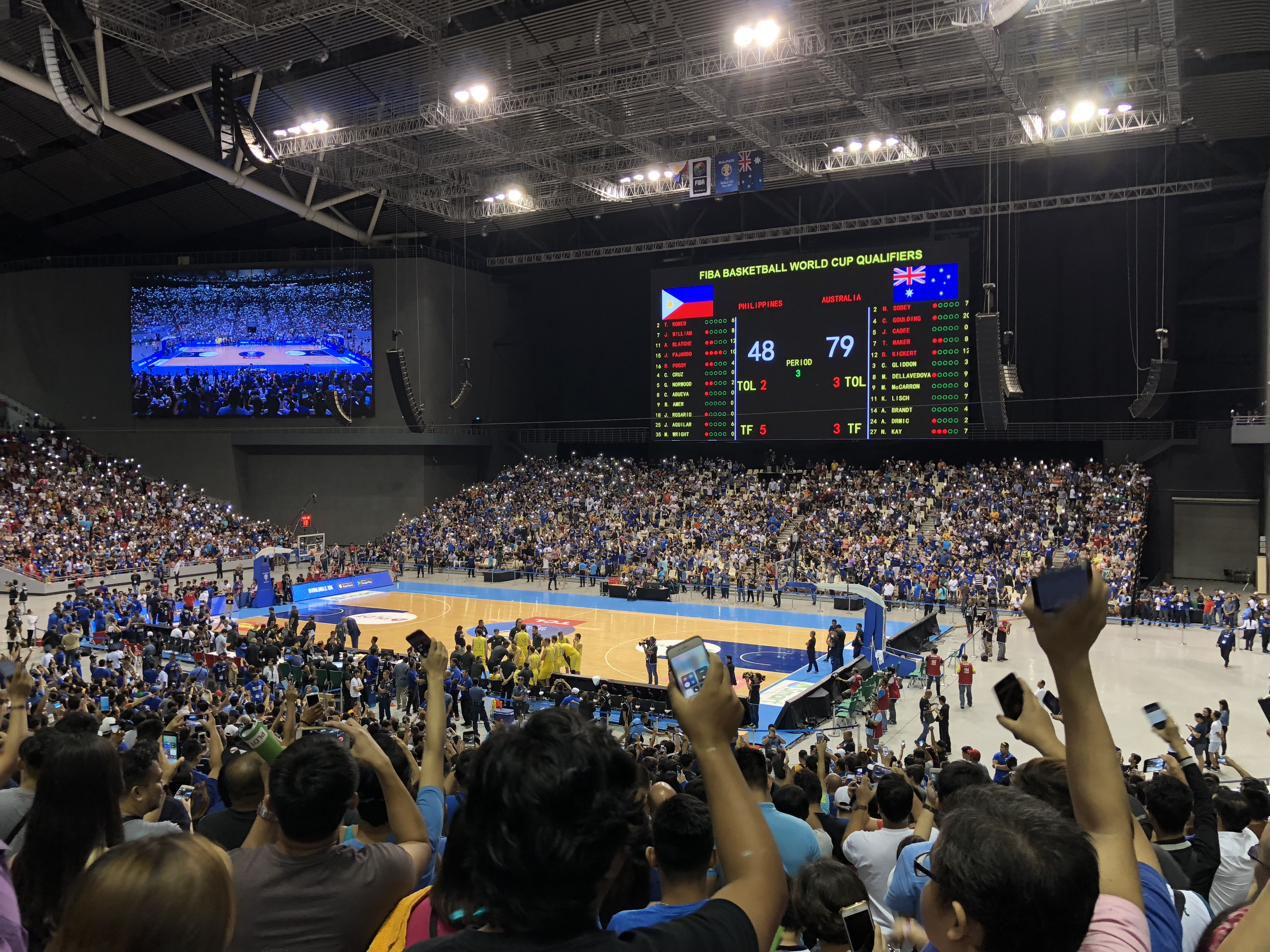
The Philippine Arena, the venue of the brawl between the Philippines and the Australia match at the 2019 FIBA Basketball World Cup Asian Qualifiers.

- July 2 – A bench-clearing brawl broke out between the Australia and Philippines men's national basketball teams during the 2019 FIBA Basketball World Cup qualifier in Bocaue. With Australia leading by over 30 points with just over 4:00 left in the third quarter, play was halted for a foul. Australia's Daniel Kickert then swung his elbow at Roger Pogoy, immediately leading to both benches clearing and a melee spreading from the bench to one of the baskets. When order was restored and game officials reviewed video of the incident, a total of 13 players were ejected—four from Australia (including Kickert) and nine from the Philippines. This left the hosts with only three players to resume the game; after two of the remaining Philippines players fouled out, leaving that team with only one player, the officials called the game, with Australia winning 89–53.
- July 19 – Ten Gilas Pilipinas players got suspended from international play for figuring in the infamous brawl that marred the FIBA World Cup Asia qualifier match between the Philippines and Australia last July 2 at the Philippine Arena.

=== Baseball ===
- March 16 – The Adamson Soaring Falcons beating the De La Salle Green Batters in the finals of UAAP Season 80 baseball tournament marking the twelfth championship title.

=== Boxing ===
- February 3 – The Philippines’ Jerwin Ancajas made a huge splash in his much-awaited US debut by knocking out Mexico's Israel "Jiga" González in the 10th round to retain the IBF junior bantamweight crown at the American Bank Center in Corpus Christi, Texas.
- February 25 – Longest reigning Filipino champion Donnie "Ahas" Nietes pulled off an impressive victory in front of American fight fans by stopping his Argentinean challenger Juan Carlos Reveco in 7 rounds of HBO's "Super Fly 2" in Inglewood, California.
- April 21 – Carl Frampton kept his undefeated fight record after he had defeated Nonito Donaire via unanimous decision in a match held at the SSE Arena, Belfast, Northern Ireland.
- May 26 – Reigning IBF world super flyweight champion Jerwin Ancajas made a fifth successful title defense following a highly dominant performance over fellow Filipino Jonas Sultan at Save Mart Arena in Fresno, California.
- June 10 – Albert Pagara won the WBO Intercontinental Super Bantamweight Championship title by gutting out a hard-fought decision against Laryea Odoi. of Ghana at the main event of Pinoy Pride 44 at the Maasin City Sports Complex, Maasin City, Southern Leyte
- July 15 – ABS-CBN, GMA Network and The 5 Network aired the boxing match between Manny Pacquiao and Argentinian boxer Lucas Matthysse, billed as the "Fight of Champions" which took place at Axiata Arena in Kuala Lumpur, Malaysia. The boxing match was also broadcast live on pay-per-view through ABS-CBN's subsidiary company Sky Cable and The 5 Network's sister company Cignal; with rebroadcasts on the former's sister network S+A. The three networks was have previously involved in the roadblock airing of his match against Floyd Mayweather Jr. billed as "The Fight of the Century", or the "Battle for Greatness" with Solar Entertainment Corporation in May 2015. Manny Pacquiao defeated Lucas Matthysse in the seventh-round by knockout to win the WBA World welterweight championship at the main event of 'Fight of Champions" at the Axiata Arena, Kuala Lumpur, Malaysia.

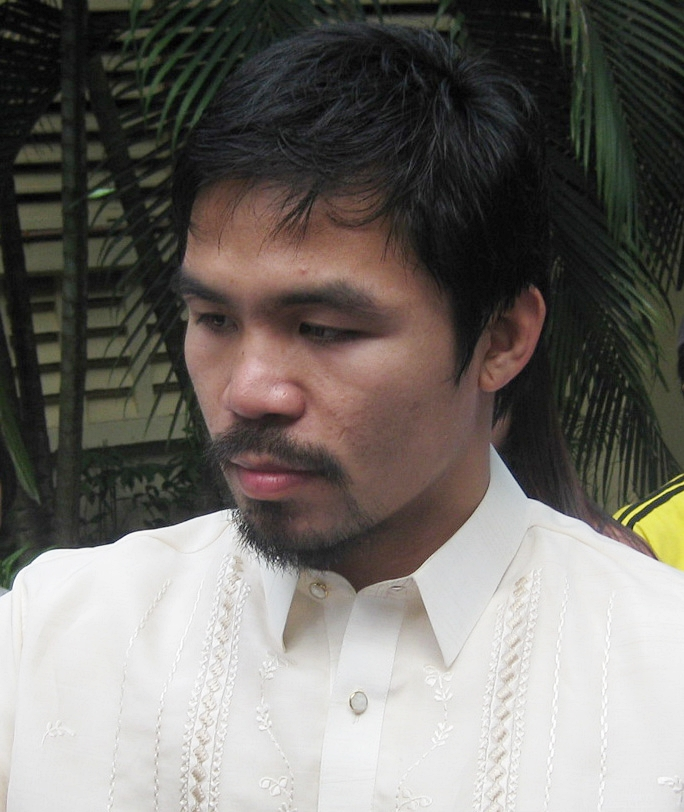
Manny Pacquiao won the boxing match, dubbed "Fight of Champions", against Lucas Matthysse

- July 15 – Dubbed as the "Fight of Champions", Manny Pacquiao won via technical knockout against Argentinian boxer Lucas Matthysse via RD7 TKO in a match to retain WBA welterweight title Held at the Axiata Arena, Kuala Lumpur, Malaysia.
- October 7 – Milan Melindo has failed in his bid to become a world champion again after losing via technical knockout to Ken Shiro of Japan in their World Boxing Council light-flyweight bout in Yokohama, Japan.
- November 3 – Nonito Donaire was crowned himself as the new WBA "Super" bantamweight champion and marked his successful return to the 118-pound class after he defeated Irish boxer Ryan Burnett in Glasgow, United Kingdom.
- December 31 – Donnie Nietes won via vacant WBO junior-bantamweight title against Japanese boxer Kazuto Ioka at the Wynn Palace, Cotai Arena in Macau, China.

=== Collegiate sports ===
- March 16 – The NCAA Season 93 cheerleading competition and closing ceremonies were simultaneously held at the Smart Araneta Coliseum, Quezon City.
- July 7 – The 94th season of the National Collegiate Athletic Association (NCAA) as hosted by the University of Perpetual Help System Daltas Was Commenced at the Mall of Asia Arena.
- September 8 – The 81st season of the University Athletic Association of the Philippines (UAAP) as hosted by the National University was Opened at the Mall of Asia Arena.
- November 17 – NU Pep Squad reclaims the UAAP Season 81 Cheerdance Competition crown held at the Mall of Asia Arena

=== Football ===
- March 27 – The Philippines national team secured qualification for the 2019 AFC Asian Cup—the team's first appearance in the tournament—after defeating Tajikistan 2–1 at the Rizal Memorial Stadium.
- April 5 – De La Salle Lady Boosters claimed their 10th Championship title of the UAAP Women's Football tournament.
- May 3 – For the second time in three seasons, University of the Philippines (UP) has ruled the UAAP men's football tournament.
- July 25 – Ceres–Negros won their second consecutive Philippines Football League title with three games to spare, following their 6–1 victory over Global Cebu in the 22nd round.
- August 11 – Philippines national team goalkeeper Neil Etheridge became the first Filipino (and first Southeast Asian) to play in the English Premier League when he debuted for Cardiff City.
- September 1 – October 27 – The inaugural staging of the Copa Paulino Alcantara—the Philippines' domestic football cup competition—was held. The tournament was won by Kaya–Iloilo, after defeating Davao Aguilas 1–0 in the final.
- October 1–9 – The Philippines national team competed in the 2018 Bangabandhu Cup hosted by Bangladesh. The Philippines topped Group B undefeated, but lost 2–0 to Tajikistan in the semi-finals.
- November 13 – December 6 – The Philippines national team co-hosted and competed in the 2018 AFF Championship. The Philippines finished second in Group B, but lost to eventual champions Vietnam on 4–2 aggregate in the semi-finals.
- December 6 – Filipino team Kaya FC Elite U13 took home silver after BIS Cruzeiros defended their crown at the Phuket Football Tournament in Thailand.

=== Golf ===
- May 16–19 – The Philippines hosted the 2018 World University Golf Championship held in Lubao Pampanga.

=== Ice hockey ===
- April 3–8 – The Philippines hosts its first International Ice Hockey Federation-sanctioned event, the Top Division of the 2018 IIHF Challenge Cup of Asia at the SM Mall of Asia Ice Skating Rink in Pasay, Metro Manila. Mongolia emerged as champions with Thailand finishing in second place. The host third in the tournament despite tying in points with Mongolia and Thailand due to goal differences.

=== Mixed martial arts ===
- May 18 – Eduard Folayang beats Kharun Atlangeriev at ONE: Unstoppable Dreams held at the Singapore Indoor Stadium in Kallang, Singapore.
- November 8 – Fighters from Team Lakay brought honor to the country after dominating the 2018 Global Martial Arts Awards.
- November 9 – A new king in the bantamweight division has been crowned following a split decision victory by Team Lakay's Kevin Belingon over Bibiano Fernandes to capture the ONE bantamweight world title in the main event of 'ONE: Heart of the Lion' fight night at the Indoor Stadium in Singapore.
- November 23 – Brandon Vera and Eduard Folayang wins their perspective titles in the ONE Championship 85 at the Mall of Asia Arena in Pasay.

– The country ends the year with five World Champions in Folayang, Vera, Joshua Pacio, Kevin Belingon and Geje Eustaquio.

=== Multi-sporting events ===
- February 9–25, Olympic Games – Two athletes represented the Philippines at the 2018 Winter Olympics held in Pyeongchang, South Korea. Asa Miller competed at Alpine skiing – Men' giant slalom event while Michael Christian Martinez competed at Figure skating – Men' singles event.
- April 15–21 – The Vigan, Ilocos Sur province hosted the 2018 Palarong Pambansa.
- April 22–27 – Bohol will hosted the 2018 PRISAA National Games held in Tagbilaran City.
- May 19–21 – The 2018 Philippine National Games It will be co-hosted by the City of Cebu and the Province of Cebu, Philippines from May 19 to 25, 2018.
- August 18 – September 2 – The Philippines send a delegation of 272 athletes in 31 sports to compete at the 2018 Asian Games in Jakarta and Palembang, Indonesia. The Philippines place 19th overall in the medal tally of the games with 21 medals won, including four gold medals from weightlifter Hidilyn Diaz in the women's 53 kg event; golfers Yuka Saso, Bianca Pagdanganan, and Lois Kaye Go in the women's team event (as well as one other from Saso in the women's individual event); and skateboarder Margielyn Didal in the women's street event.

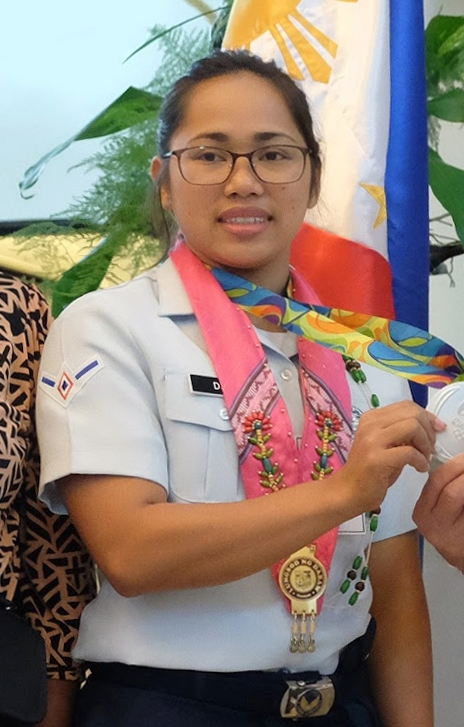
Hidilyn Diaz

- August 21, Weightlifting – Weightlifter Hidilyn Diaz won the Philippines' first gold medal in the Asian Games, capturing the women's 53-kilograms event at Jakarta International Expo Hall A in Indonesia.
- August 26:
  - Golf – Filipino-Japanese Yuka Saso captured the Philippines' second gold medal after ruling the women's golf tournament in the 2018 Asian Games at the Pondok Indah Golf and Country Club in Indonesia.
  - Golf – Yuka Saso together with Bianca Isabel Pagdanganan and Lois Kaye Go won another gold medal, this time from the golf women's team event in the 2018 Asian Games at the Pondok Indah Golf and Country Club in Indonesia.
- August 29, Skateboarding – Athlete Margielyn Didal barely broke a sweat to rule the women's street skateboard competition at the 2018 Asian Games in Indonesia, securing the country's fourth gold medal.
- October 6–13, Multi-sport – The Philippines send a delegation of 57 athletes in 18 sports to compete at the 2018 Asian Para Games in Jakarta and Palembang, Indonesia. The Philippines place 11th overall in the medal tally of the games with 29 medals won, including ten gold medals.
- October 7 Swimming (Men's 200-meter Individual Medley) – Para swimmer Ernie Gawilan has made history for the Philippines, as he delivered the country's first ever gold medal in the Asian Para Games in Jakarta, Indonesia.
- October 8, Bowling – Bowler Kim Ian Chi gets the second gold medal of the Philippines at the 2018 Asian Para Games in Jakarta, Indonesia.
- October 10, Chess – The Philippine chess team wins 3 golds in a 6-medal haul in the 2018 Asian Para Games in Jakarta, Indonesia.
- October 14 Sailing: – Philippine Kiteboarder Christian Tio won the Philippines' first silver medal in the Youth Olympics, capturing the boy's IKA Twin Tip Racing event at the Club Náutico San Isidro in San Isidro, Buenos Aires, Argentina.
- November 2, Gymnastics – Carlos Yulo became the first Filipino gymnast ever to win bronze medal in the men's floor event of the 2018 World Artistic Gymnastics Championships at Aspire Dome in Doha, Qatar.
- November 25, Jiu-Jitsu – Meggie Ochoa became the first Filipino to reign supreme on the global jiu-jitsu stage when she gold at the 2018 JuJutsu World Championship in Malmö, Sweden.
- December 10 – Asian Games gold medalist Margielyn Didal is the sole Filipino in Time magazine's list of 25 Most Influential Teens of 2018.

=== POC and PSC ===
- February 23 – The Philippine Olympic Committee held elections for the post of President and chairman after the 2016 elections results were declared null and void by the Pasig Regional Trial Court. The court required Ricky Vargas and Abraham Tolentino to be candidates for the post of President and chairman respectively. Vargas and Tolentino won over incumbents Peping Cojuangco and Ting Ledesma.

=== Volleyball ===
- February 19 − The Arellano Lady Chiefs seals their third championship title in the NCAA season 93 women's volleyball against the San Beda Red Lionesses in 2 games. Regine Anne Arocha acclaimed the Finals MVP title
- February 22 – The Perpetual Altas claims the NCAA Season 93 men's volleyball title after beating Arellano Chiefs in a four-setter do-or-die match, 25–23, 25–27, 25–19, 25–23. Perpetual Help's Rey Taneo, Jr. hailed as the Finals MVP.
- May 2
  - The National University Bulldogs are once again the kings of UAAP Volleyball after they defeated the Ateneo Blue Eagles, in four hard-fought sets, on Game 2 of the best of 3 series. The final score was 25–20, 31–29, 22–25, 33–31.
  - The De La Salle University's (DLSU) Lady Spikers won their 11th championship title, 3rd consecutive title in the season 80 of the UAAP women's volleyball tournament against Far Eastern University's (FEU) Lady Tamaraws in three straight sets: 26–24, 25–20, and 26–24. Dawn Macandili was named the finals' MVP.
- May 5 − The Petron Blaze Spikers sealed their fourth championship title in the 2018 PSL Grand Prix Conference against F2 Logistics Cargo Movers in 4 games. Lindsay Stalzer acclaimed the Finals MVP title.
- July 11 – the Creamline Cool Smashers won their first championship in the Premier Volleyball League during the league's reinforced conference. Jia Morado was awarded the best setter and finals' MVP, Myla Pablo received the conference MVP honors.
- September 12 – the University of the Philippines Fighting Lady Maroons ended a 36-year title drought by winning the 2018 Premier Volleyball League Collegiate Conference championship. Isa Molde won the conference and finals' most valuable player awards.
- December 8 – the Creamline Cool Smashers won the 2018 Premier Volleyball League Open Conference championship against the Ateneo-Motolite Lady Eagles thus making it back-to-back titles in the second season of the Premier Volleyball League. Alyssa Valdez was awarded the conference MVP and a back-to-back finals' MVP award for Jia Morado.
- December 14 – the Philippine Air Force Agilas captured their fourth championship title by winning the 2018 Spikers’ Turf Open Conference. Alnakran Abdilla was awarded the finals' MVP and Bryan Bagunas received the conference MVP award.

=== Other events ===
- April 28 – May 6 — The 2018 World's Strongest Man was the 41st edition of the World's Strongest Man competition. It was held in Manila, Philippines from April 28 to May 6.
- December 30–31 – Ultimate Fighting Championship ends of its 3-year broadcast rights with The 5 Network's sports division ESPN 5 and pay television network provider, Hyper. Their final broadcast on both networks was UFC 232: Jones vs. Gustafsson 2. After this, It was announced that S+A will be the new home for the UFC starting in the following year; the distribution of their subscription service UFC Fight Pass will be transferred to S+A's parent division ABS-CBN Sports will also be part of their move.

=== Other sports ===
- June 18 – 23 Floorball: The Philippines competed at the 2018 Asia-Oceania Floorball Cup held in Singapore, This team finished 5th

== Awards ==
- February 27 – 2018 PSA Annual Awards

== Deaths ==
January

- January 30 – Joaquín Rojas (b. 1938), Olympic basketball player

February

- February 2 – Barry Pascua (b. 1962), sportscaster, columnist
- February 25 – Danny Florencio (b. 1947) basketball player

April

- April 20 – Leopoldo Cantancio (b. 1963), olympic boxer

June

- June 30 – James Gonzales (b. 1997), collegiate volleyball player

August

- August 22 — Joey Mente (b. 1976), professional basketball player.

September

- September 2 — Ian Lariba (b. 1994), first Filipina Table Tennis olympian, Philippine flagbearer at the 2016 Summer Olympics.
- September 27 – Rolly Manlapaz (b. 1960), Popular Coliseum Barker for UAAP, NCAA, PBA.

October

- October 31 – Rutger Acidre (b. 1994), NAASCU Player (CUP Eagles), brother of Bacoor Strikers Guard Rocky Acidre.

== See also ==
- 2018 in the Philippines
- 2018 in sports
