= Dil Maya Rai =

Bhutanese politician

Member of the National Assembly of Bhutan
- Incumbent
- Assumed office 31 October 2018
- Preceded by: Ritu Raj Chhetri
- Constituency: Tashichhoeling

Personal details
- Born: c. 1973
- Party: Druk Nyamrup Tshogpa (DNT)

Dil Maya Rai is a Bhutanese politician who has been a member of the National Assembly of Bhutan since October 2018.

== Education ==
She holds a master's degree in Development Management from Asian Institute of Management and a Bachelor of Sociology degree from the University of the Philippines Los Baños.

== Political career ==
Prior to entering politics, she was a social development specialist.

She was elected to the National Assembly of Bhutan as a candidate of DNT from Tashichhoeling constituency in 2018 Bhutanese National Assembly election. She received 6,032 votes and defeated Durga Prasad, a candidate of DPT.
