= Washington SyCip Graduate School of Business =

Private school in Makati, Philippines

Coordinates: 14°33′09″N 121°01′08″E

The Washington SyCip Graduate School of Business, or simply WSGSB, is the business school of the Asian Institute of Management in Manila, Philippines. It is one of the leading business schools in the Asia-Pacific region, especially in the fields of management, finance and business administration.

The SyCip MBA program is one of the most recognized in the region, and in September 2025, its Online MBA ranked #1 Worldwide for Class Experience, 7th in Asia Pacific in the Quacquarelli Symonds (QS) 2026 ranking.

WSGSB has served as the flagship training ground for the next generation of business leaders and managers in Asia's emerging markets and societies. Since 1968, more than 8,000 WSGSB graduates from 71 countries have utilized their AIM degree as a passport to exciting, rewarding, and fulfilling careers.

== Programs ==
The school offers the following programs:

- Executive Doctor of Business Administration (DBA)
- International Master of Business Administration (iMBA)
- Executive Master of Business Administration (EMBA)
- Online Master of Business Administration (OMBA)
- Master of Science in Financial Technology (MScFinTech) (dual-awarded degree with Manchester Metropolitan University)
- Executive Master in Cybersecurity Management (EMCSM)
- Master in International Business Law (MIBL)

== Faculty ==
The faculty is led by its School Associate Professor Head, Jose Gerardo O. Santamaria, PhD, who also currently serves as the Interim Academic Program Director Executive Master in Cybersecurity Management (EMCM).

The following faculty members of the Asian Institute of Management are the Program Heads of the respective degrees offered by WSGSB:

- Jamil Paolo S. Francisco, PhD (Associate Professor; executive director, S. Navarro Center for Competitiveness) - Academic Program Director, Executive Doctor of Business Administration (DBA)
- John Francis T. Diaz, CMA, PhD (Associate Professor) - Academic Program Director, International Master in Business Administration (iMBA)
- Raul P. Rodriguez, PhD (Retired Clinical Professor) - Academic Program Director, Executive Master in Business Administration (EMBA)
- Albert Wee Kwan Tan, PhD (Clinical Professor) - Academic Program Director, Online Master in Business Administration (OMBA)
- Daniel Broby, PhD (Professor) - Academic Program Director, Master of Science in Financial Technology (MScFinTech)
- Mario C. Cerilles Jr., LLM (Assistant Professor) - Academic Program Director, Master in International Business Law (MIBL)
