= 2018 Naga, Cebu, landslide =

2018 landslide in Philippines

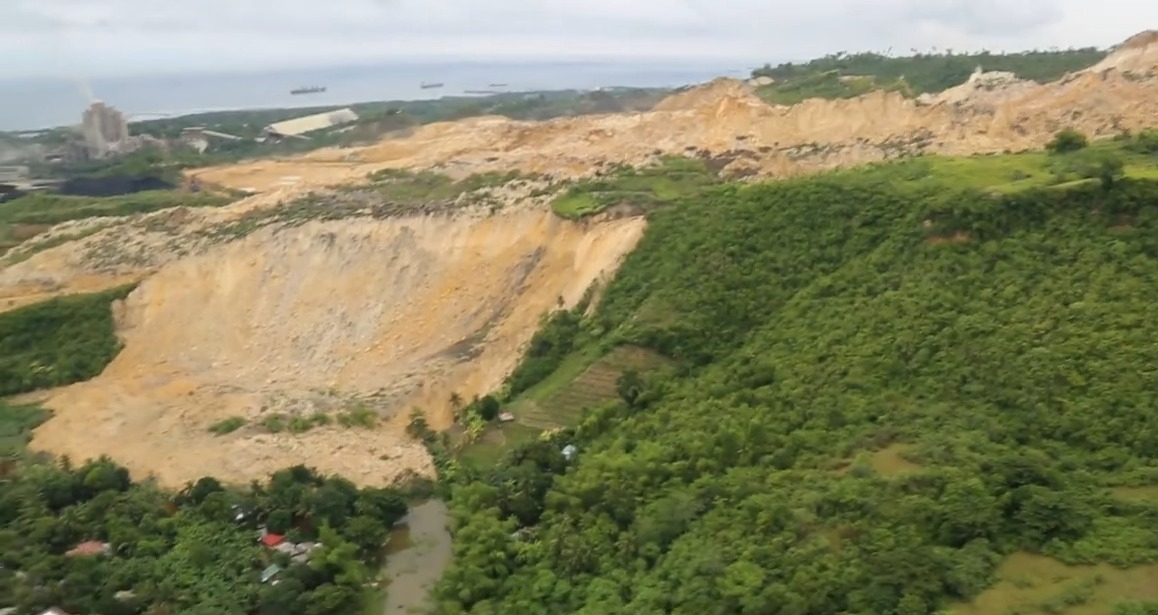
- Date: September 20, 2018
- Location: Naga, Cebu, Philippines
- Deaths: 78
- Injuries: 18
- Missing: 5

On September 20, 2018, a landslide caused by heavy rainfall and quarrying operations by Apo Land and Quarry Corporations (ALQC) in Naga, Cebu, Philippines, killed 78 people. Five others are missing. This is the second deadly landslide to occur in the country in five days; the first occurred in Itogon, Benguet, on September 15, triggered by Typhoon Mangkhut (Ompong), leaving at least 35 dead.

== Background ==
According to the Mines and Geosciences Bureau (MGB), the area had long been identified as landslide-prone. Prior to the landslide, the MGB discovered the cracks in the mountain on August 28. On August 29, the letter from MGB addressed to the Naga Mayor Kristine Chiong said that the cracks "do not pose an imminent danger to the neighboring community". This prompted Chiong to order the mining operator, Apo Land and Quarry Corporation (ALQC), to cease all operations of quarrying. The MGB replied to Chiong, saying that, based on her technical report, they "considered decision" to resume the operation. Chiong allowed the operations to resume on September 5 with the conditions given, including the "creation of an evacuation and relocation plan". However, on September 11, the size of the crack increased from a previous 3 mm to 35 mm.

== Landslide ==
Early on the morning of September 20, 2018, a hillside began to crack and collapse into several homes in Sitio Sindulan, Tinaan, Naga, Cebu after days of heavy rainfall, killing at least 53. About 50 people were reported to have been trapped. According to the local authorities, there were 6 partially damaged and 77 totally damaged houses due to the landslide. The landslide also covered part of the river, prompting officials to dig a temporary canal. The landslide covered about 80.12 hectares.

== Aftermath ==
Footage from an aerial survey of the site showing the aftermath of the landslide

The local government issued a state of calamity in the villages of Tinaan, Naalad, Mainit, Pangdan, and Cabungahan. According to a local resident named Cristita Villarba, they heard a rumbling sound coming from the mountain and then the ground shook as if it was like an earthquake. More than 600 families were evacuated from their homes, fearing that the landslide will occur again. According to the police chief inspector Roderick Gonzales, they received messages coming from a person who was trapped in the rubble, indicating signs of life. At least 77 bodies were recovered in the rescue operations. A total of 2,087 families or 8,655 persons have been affected by the landslide. An actual video of the landslide was recorded on CCTV camera.

On the afternoon of September 21, President Rodrigo Duterte visited the landslide victims and mourned the deaths caused by the disaster. Duterte also vowed to relocate the affected residents. The Department of the Interior and Local Government (DILG) said that they temporarily suspended all quarrying activities around the country, following the landslide.

The Department of Social Welfare and Development reported a total of ₱80,475,632.13 worth of relief assistance, with the department extending relief support and financial assistance worth ₱8,653,230.18 and local government units providing ₱45,282,880.60. The National Housing Authority also committed ₱175 million to build 320 housing units for the landslide victims, while the city government of Naga allotted an initial amount of P25 million for the construction of 50 housing units. The provincial government of Cebu also donated 2.7 hectares of the "Balili property" to be used as the relocation site.
