= Analytics, Computing, and Complex Systems Laboratory =

Analytics, Computing, and Complex Systems Laboratory (ACCeSs@AIM)
- Established: March 8, 2018; 8 years ago
- Research type: Applied
- Field of research: Data Science, Complex Systems
- Managing Director: Christopher P. Monterola
- Location: Makati, Philippines; 14°33′8.9″N 121°1′07.7″E
- Campus: Asian Institute of Management
- Affiliations: Asian Institute of Management
- Website: asite.aim.edu/access-lab/

The Analytics, Computing, and Complex Systems (ACCeSs@AIM) Laboratory is a R&D laboratory in Makati, Metro Manila, Philippines. It is situated within the Asian Institute of Management (AIM).

ACCeSs@AIM is AIM's first data science R&D consulting arm. It houses full-time research scientists and research engineers and hosts the fastest supercomputer in the Philippines, among the fastest in Southeast Asia. ACCeSs is envisaged to lead and advocate for the use of complex systems science, data analytics, artificial intelligence, and computational models to support innovation in industries, government agencies, and other sectors.

== Background ==
The Analytics, Computing, and Complex Systems laboratory, also known by its short name ACCeSs@AIM, is situated within the Asian Institute of Management (AIM) in Makati. It is under AIM's School of Innovation, Technology and Entrepreneurship.

The facility was launched on March 8, 2018 by the Asian Institute of Management (AIM) with Acer Inc. Acer founder Stan Shih who is also part of AIM's international board of governors for more than three decades was also in attendance during the launch of the laboratory to concurrently introduce to the public the Acer-developed supercomputer he donated to the lab.

== Usage ==
ACCeSs@AIM is meant to support the computing needs of Asian Institute of Management's graduate students and faculty, as well as researchers and its other stakeholders. It is optimized for Artificial Intelligence research meant to aid the growth of businesses and other organizations through computing technology. The laboratory is meant to encourage public-to-private partnership between the academia, business sectors and the government in the field of research and development.

It is also specifically meant to complement AIM's Master of Science in Data Science program and its PhD in Data Science program.

To date, through the MSc. in Data Science program, ACCeSs has completed thirty-nine (39) capstone projects with government agencies including the Commission on Higher Education (Philippines), the Bangko Sentral ng Pilipinas, and the Armed Forces of the Philippines, local and multinational corporations including Analog Devices, Western Digital Corporation, Moog, Inc., Reckitt Benckiser, ProWeaver, Inc., and Qavalo, Inc., to name a few, and international organizations like the Asian Development Bank and Unilab Foundation.

== Supercomputer ==
ACCeSs@AIM's supercomputer, a.k.a. Super Jojie, is provided by Taiwanese technology firm Acer and was donated by the StanShih Foundation to AIM. The supercomputer has a capacity of 500 terabytes and computing speed of 12.9 teraflops (CPU)/1.2 petaflops (GPU) making it the fastest supercomputer in the Philippines and among the fastest in Southeast Asia. It was fully operational in April 2018.

At the time of donation, Acer Philippines described the supercomputer's capability as roughly equivalent to 250 "high end" laptops combined. In terms of storage it described the supercomputer as capable of holding "50 years of movie hours". Acer has since reinforced the computing power of Supercomputer Jojie, doubling its GPU speed to 1.2 petaflops in 2021.
