= SyCip Gorres Velayo & Co. =

Philippine multidisciplinary professional services firm

SGV & Co.
- Formerly: W. SyCip & Company (1946-1947); SyCip Velayo José & Company (1947-1953)
- Industry: Professional services
- Founded: 1946; 80 years ago in Manila, Philippines
- Founder: Washington SyCip
- Headquarters: Makati, Philippines
- Key people: Wilson P. Tan (Chairman); Rossana A. Fajardo (Country Managing Partner)
- Website: www.sgv.ph

SyCip Gorres Velayo & Company (branded as SGV & Company) is a Philippine multidisciplinary professional services firm.

As of 2014, SGV & Company has employed over 3,000 professionals from various disciplines, including Certified Public Accountants, legal professionals, economists, human resource professionals, engineers, statisticians, financial analysts, and other business and technical experts.

Since 1996, it has been the only ISO 9002-certified professional services firm in the country and became a member firm of Ernst & Young International on June 6, 2002.

== History ==
=== Early years ===
SyCip, Gorres, Velayo, and Company was founded in 1946 by Washington SyCip in Manila, providing services to businesses recovering from the Second World War. SyCip's childhood friend, Alfredo M. Velayo, and Vicente O. José, an accountant with experience in tax work, were taken in as partners in 1947 to form SyCip, Velayo, José & Company. The firm managed their first overseas assignment the following year.

=== Growth ===
The firm embarked on its first overseas engagement by working out a merger with Henry Hunter Bayne & Co. (HHB), which started its practice in the then-American controlled Philippine Islands in 1906. In 1953, Thomas Farnell, a senior partner of HHB, decided to return to the United States and sell his firm to Filipino accountants Arsenio Reyes and Ramón J. Gorres. After a series of negotiations between the two and SyCip, the firms merged to form SyCip, Gorres, Velayo & Company.

In 1958, SGV & Company assumed the practice of British firm Fleming & Williamson, which was rated the second-largest accounting firm in the Philippines, and expanded further by establishing offices in Bacolod and Davao.

In the 1960s, the SGV Group was established and it began correspondent relations with some of the leading western firms, among them Arthur Andersen & Co.; Ernst & Ernst; Haskins & Sells; and Ernst & Young. SGV partnered with Taiwanese public accounting firm, T.N. Soong & Co in 1964 through a technical cooperation agreement amidst the economic boom in Taiwan.

In the 1970s the SGV Group gained accreditation from the World Bank and the Asian Development Bank.

In 1985, SGV & Company became a member firm of Arthur Andersen & Co., S.C., one of the largest professional service organisations in the world. A year later, the firm opened its Manila Offshore Systems Development Center, with assistance from Andersen Consulting, and has provided computer software services to foreign clients through Andersen Consulting's global marketing network and resources.

=== Secession ===
In 1988 senior partner Benjamin Punongbayan left SGV with banker José Araullo to form Punongbayan & Araullo. Mario Mananghaya, another SGV partner, went on to establish former KPMG member, Laya Mananghaya & Company, later sold to a consortium owned by former SGV chairman Cesar Purisima in 2007, having grown the firm to the second or third biggest accounting firm in the country.

=== Victorias Milling Corporation ===
In 2000, the country's local accountant's professional body reprimanded SGV, then an Andersen affiliate in the Philippines, in relation to its audit with Victorias Milling Company. SGV withdrew audit reports worth three years after it was found out that it certified them without checking, which were later determined to be fraudulent.

=== Ernst & Young affiliation ===
SGV distanced itself from Arthur Andersen in 2002, after the latter became involved in the Enron scandal. SGV & Company became a member practice of Ernst & Young on September 1, 2002. Previously the Ernst & Young affiliate in the country was Punongbayan & Araullo.

=== SGV 14 ===
In 2008, a group dubbed as the SGV 14 led by then Vice Chairman Roman Felipe Reyes disputed the integration of SGV's local operations with Ernst & Young's international operation arguing the move was against the constitution since the local accounting industry is restricted to Filipinos. Reyes' group with Chairman David Balangue ousted by Cirilo Noel who became chairman in 2009. The SGV 14 settled for a "withdrawal package" agreement which include a non-compete clause baring them from working with SGV's competitors for several years. Reyes and 11 others of the group later established Reyes Tacandong & Co. which became an affiliate of RSM International.

=== 2010s ===
As of 2010, SGV is headquartered in Makati, about ten branches across the Philippines. As of December 2016, SGV & Company remains the biggest accounting firm in the Philippines, auditing about half of 304 publicly listed companies in the Philippine Stock Exchange. SGV has been receiving stiff competition from rival firms, KPMG R.G. Manabat & Co., Reyes Tacandong & Co., Isla Lipana & Co., and Navarro Amper & Co. all established by former partners of the SGV.
