= Washington SyCip =

Filipino-American accountant

Washington SyCip 薛華盛
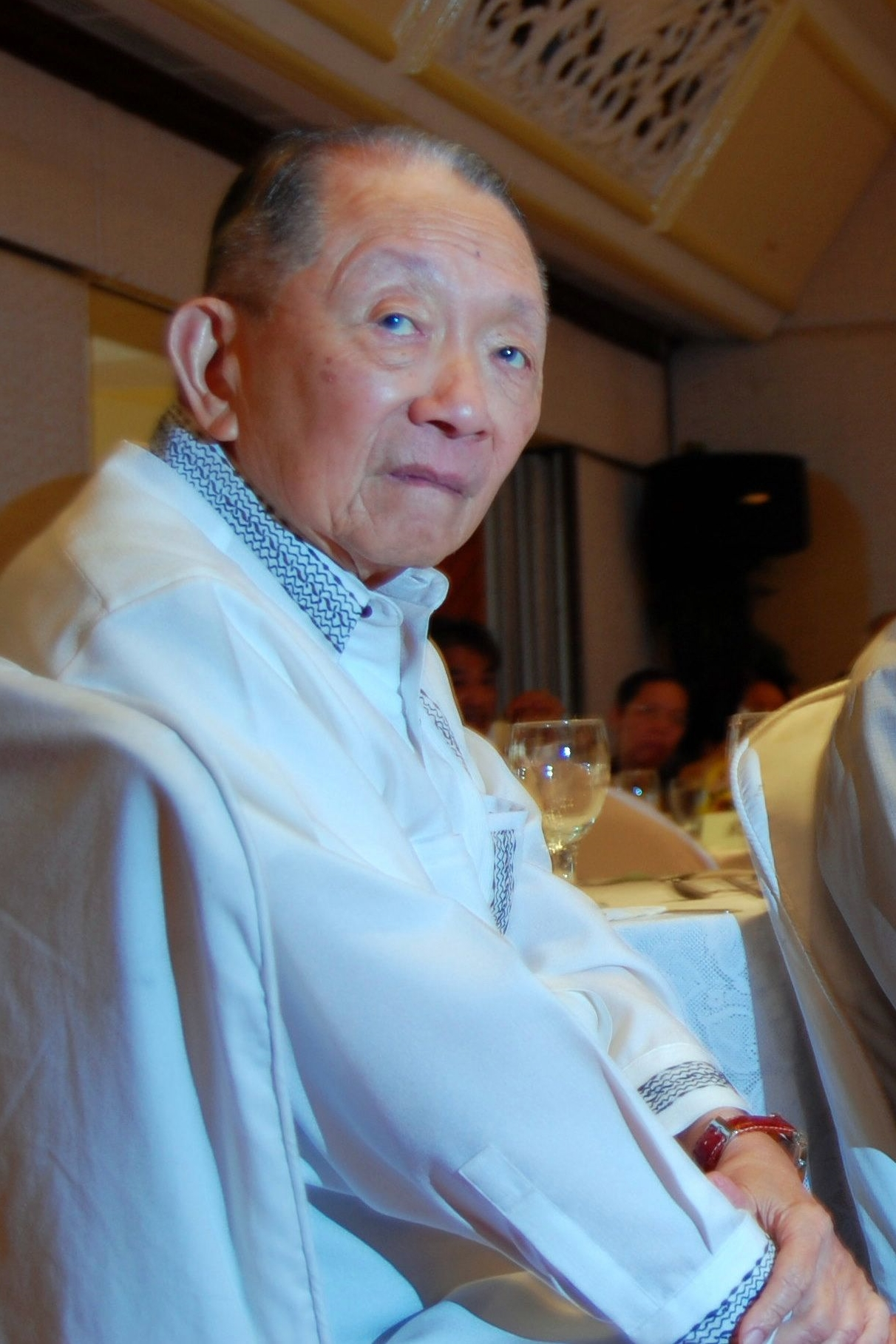
- SyCip at Club Filipino in San Juan in 2008
- Born: 30 June 1921; Manila, Philippine Islands
- Died: 7 October 2017 (aged 96); Pacific Ocean
- Education: University of Santo Tomas; Columbia University
- Occupation: Accountant
- Known for: Founder of the SGV Group and Asian Institute of Management
- Spouse: Anna Yu
- Children: 3
- Parent(s): Albino SyCip; Helen Bau SyCip
- Military career
- Allegiance: United States
- Branch: United States Army
- Service years: 1942-1945
- Conflicts: Burma Campaign (World War II)
- Website: www.washingtonsycip.org

Washington Z. SyCip, PLH BOLk RNO1kl (/ˈsiːsɪp/; Chinese: 薛華成 / 薛華盛; Pe̍h-ōe-jī: Sih Hôa-sêng; pinyin: Xuē Huáchéng; 30 June 1921 – 7 October 2017) was a Chinese-Filipino-American accountant. He was the founder of the accounting firm EY SGV & Company and the Asian Institute of Management.

== Early life and education ==
SyCip was born in Manila on 30 June 1921 to Albino and Helen SyCip. His father, Albino SyCip, co-founded Chinabank in 1920. His name was derived from the fact that his father was in Washington, D.C., at the time of his birth. He spent his early years living in Shanghai before attending Padre Burgos Elementary School and Victorino Mapa High School. He skipped three grade levels in elementary school.

SyCip earned a commerce degree at the University of Santo Tomas (UST) with summa cum laude honors at age 17. He taught in UST while pursuing a master's degree. He passed the board examinations for Certified Public Accountants at age 18. In 1940, he went to the United States to attend the Columbia University in New York to complete a post-graduate degree. He completed all academic requirements for the degree except for his dissertation due to the outbreak of World War II.

== World War II ==
After learning of his father's imprisonment in the Philippines by Japanese invading forces, he reevaluated his plans of pursuing a doctorate degree. In 1942, he enlisted himself in the US Army and became a naturalized US citizen in 1943. He joined Camp Cooke but was told to be "overqualified" for the infantry for having the highest IQ level in his regiment. He studied Japanese in a language school in Colorado and cryptography in Virginia. He was then deployed to Calcutta, British India as a codebreaker.

== Career ==
After World War II, SyCip was discharged from the US Army and returned to Manila at age 24. He initially taught accounting at the University of Santo Tomas and two other colleges. He decided against joining one of the British accounting firms returning to the country following the war reasoning that only a white person could become a business partner in such firms.

In March 1946, he opened W. SyCip & Company with a desk in his brother Alexander’s law office in Binondo. He eventually partnered with Alfredo M. Velayo and Vicente O. José to form SyCip, Velayo, José & Company. The firm would evolve into what is now known as SGV & Company (SGV). SyCip earned a Master of Science in Commerce from Columbia Business School.

By 1958, SGV was already the biggest accounting firm in the Philippines and already overtook Fleming & Williamson the then largest British firm operating in the country. He retired as chairman of SGV in 1996 but remained involved with the firm until his death.

In 1968, he co-founded the Asian Institute of Management in the Philippines and served as chairman of its board of trustees and board of governors. He was the first chairman of the Euro-Asia Center of INSEAD, a leading graduate business school, in Fontainebleau, France.

SyCip was a founding governor of the Wharton School's Lauder Institute.

== Death ==
SyCip died on October 7, 2017, aboard Philippine Airlines Flight 126, which took off from Manila bound for Vancouver with continuing service to New York City. He was with his son, George SyCip, and an assistant, Roberto Cabilles. He died before reaching Vancouver.

== Legacy ==
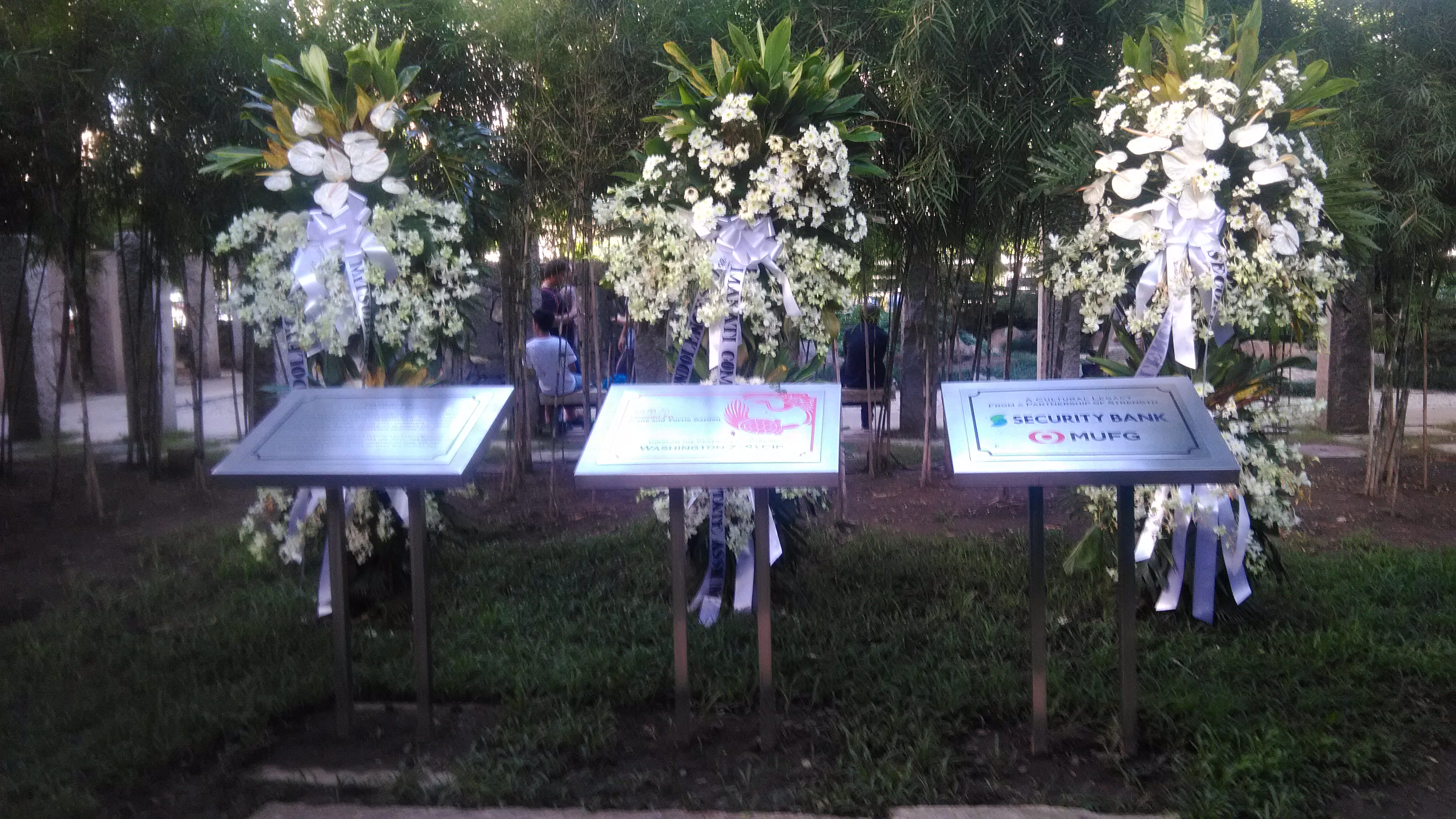
Flowers displayed at the Washington SyCip Park shortly after his death.

As of December 2016, SGV & Company (SGV) continues to be the largest accounting firm in the Philippines, auditing about half of 304 publicly listed companies in the Philippine Stock Exchange. SGV has stiff competition from rival firms, Punongbayan & Araullo, KPMG RG Manabat & Company, and Reyes Tacandong & Company, which were established by former business partners of SGV.

The Washington SyCip Park in Makati, Metro Manila was named in his honour on the occasion of his 85th birthday.

The Ayala Foundation and the Jollibee Group Foundation launched fundraising for the "INSEAD Washington SyCip Scholarship" for Filipino MBA students in honour of SyCip.

== Positions ==
Positions held by SyCip prior to his death:

- BDO Unibank, Inc, (PSE: BDO), Adviser to the Board
- Belle Corporation (PSE: BEL), Independent Director
- Cityland Development Corporation (PSE:
- First Philippine Holdings Corporation (PSE: FPH), Independent Director
- Highlands Prime, Inc., Independent Director
- Lopez Holdings Corporation (PSE: LPZ), Independent Director
- MacroAsia Corporation (PSE: MAC), Co-Chairman
- Metro Pacific Investments Corporation (PSE: MPI), Independent Director
- Metropolitan Bank & Trust Company (PSE: MBT), Adviser to the Board
- Philippine Long Distance Telephone Company (PSE: TEL), Adviser to the Board
- Philippine National Bank (PSE: PNB), Director

== Awards ==
- Doctor of Philosophy, honoris causa degree from the De La Salle University (1977)
- Doctor of Accounting Education, honoris causa degree from the University of Santo Tomas (1984)
- Officer First Class of the Order of the Polar Star (1987)
- Philippine Legion of Honor, Degree of Commander (1991)
- Doctor of Laws, honoris causa degree from the University of the Philippines Diliman (2001)
- Doctor of Science (Management), honoris causa, Holy Angel University, 2010
- Order of Lakandula, Rank of Grand Cross (Bayani) (2011)
- Ramon V. del Rosario Award for Nation Building (2012)
- Doctor of Laws, honoris causa degree from the Ateneo de Manila University (2012)
- Order of the Rising Sun, Second Class, Gold and Silver Star, Japan (2017)

== Personal life ==
Sycip was married to Anna Yu with whom he had three children; Victoria, George, and Robert.
