= 2018 Isulan bombings =

Terrorist attack in the Philippines

- Part of Moro conflict
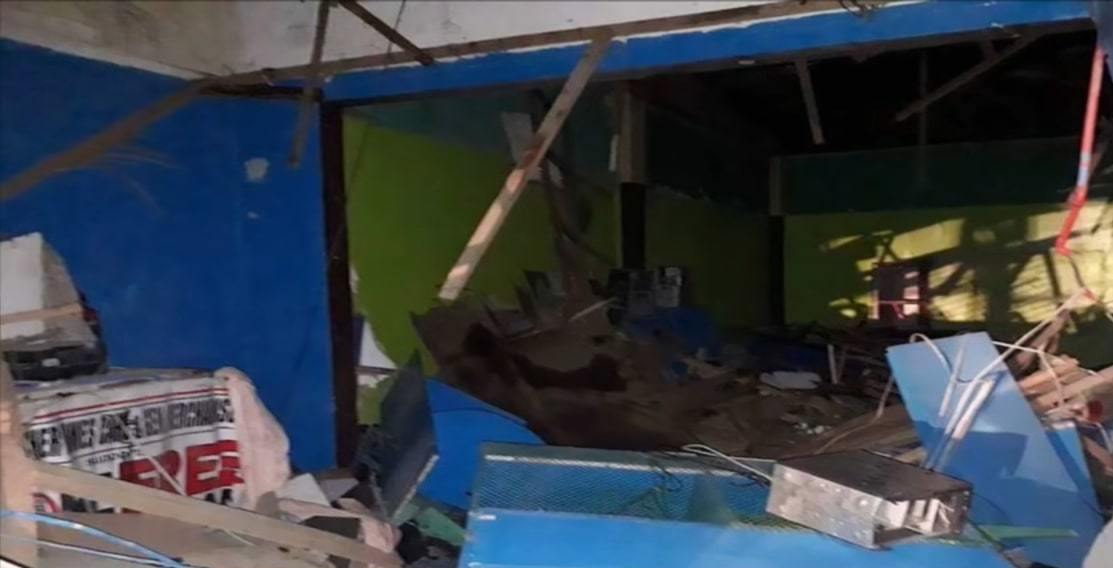
- Aftermath of the September 2 twin bombings

- Isulan (Mindanao mainland) Isulan (Philippines) Location of the twin bombings in the town of Isulan
- Location: Isulan, Sultan Kudarat, Philippines
- Date: August 28 and September 2, 2018; First largest explosion: 28 August, 20:34:10 (UTC+8); Second explosion: 2 September, 19:28:25 (UTC+8)
- Attack type: Bombing
- Weapons: First largest explosion: Improvised explosive device planted on a parked motorcycle
- Victims: First largest explosion: 3 deaths, 36 injuries Second explosion: 2 deaths, 12 injuries
- No. of participants: 7
- Motive: Revenge terrorism, Jihad
- Accused: Normia Antao Camsa, Norshiya Joven Camsa, Abedin Camsa alias “Beds,” Hassan Akgun

The Isulan bombing was an act of Islamic terrorism by Bangsamoro Islamic Freedom Fighters in the municipality of Isulan, Sultan Kudarat, which killed 3 and injured over 36 in a town festival.

== August 28 bombing ==
The bombing occurred on 28 August 2018 at around 8:34 pm local time in Barangay Kalawag 3 in front of J and H Marketing, a retail area for ukay ukay merchandise, along the National Highway around the area of the Isulan town proper. The explosion was caused by an improvised explosive device planted on a parked motorcycle. The incident happened amidst the Hamungaya Festival, a harvest festival celebrated in the Isulan annually.

=== Casualties ===
The blasts had three casualties: a 51-year-old, a 7-year-old child, and an 18-year-old college student. The 51-year-old died at the bombing site while the two died while confined in a hospital due to serious injuries from shrapnel wounds. 36 people were injured which includes two soldiers and a militia personnel.

=== Investigation ===
==== Suspects ====
The police and military believed the Bangsamoro Islamic Freedom Fighters were behind the bombing, believed to be in retaliation to the group's losses in clashes against the Philippine Army.

The police later released an official sketch of an individual tagged as a suspect to the bombing on September 1, 2018. The suspect was described as a 20 to 25 years old male who is 5 feet 6 inches (168 centimetres) tall, weighs about 60 kilograms (130 pounds), with a medium built and a white complexion. The police believed that the suspect was working with accomplices since the bombing was made in a manner that it cannot be done by a single person.

Authorities filed charges against 7 suspects, 2 of which were still at large. Four were identified as Normia Antao Camsa, Norshiya Joven Camsa, Abedin Camsa alias “Beds,” and a Swedish national, Hassan Akgun.

==== Methods ====
According to the police, the suspect detonated an improvised explosive device (IED) using a mobile phone. He was said to have been accosted by a militiaman when he placed the bomb under a parked motorbike. The IED's composition was determined to consist of black powder filled inside a barrel of water pump laced with cut nails and metal shards. A nine-volt battery was placed as a triggering device.

=== Reaction ===
Executive Salvador Medialdea hinted on August 29 that the Martial law in Mindanao which was due to terminate by the end of 2018 could be extended following the bombing. Local officials of Sultan Kudarat as well as Maguindanao expressed openness to the possible extension of martial law. Further activities in relation to the 104th foundation day of Isulan and the Hamungaya Festival were cancelled.

== September 2 twin bombings ==
A second explosion, 500 metres away from the 28 August bombing, occurred on Sunday, 2 September 2018 around 7:30 pm local time outside an Internet café in the Barangay Kalawag 2 area of the city killing 2 and injuring 15. No group claimed responsibility, however the army division commander, Brigadier General Cirilito Sobejana, believed it to be the Bangsamoro Islamic Freedom Fighters.
