= 2018 Philippine National Games =

2018 POC-PSC Games
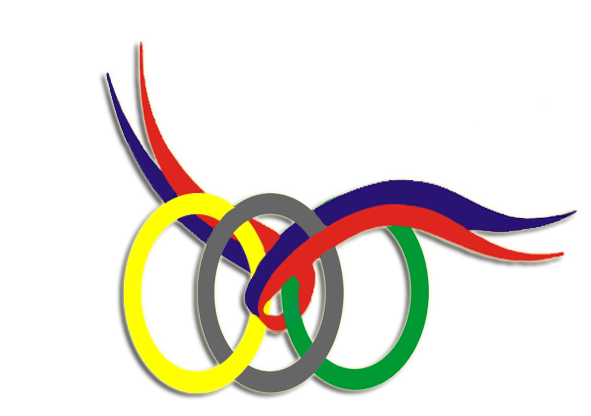
- Host city: Cebu City
- Country: Philippines
- Teams: 92 LGUs
- Opened by: President Rodrigo Duterte
- Torch lighter: Ramon Fernandez
- Main venue: Cebu City Sports Complex
- Race length: May 19–25, 2018

The 2018 Philippine National Games was the sixth edition in the modern era (ninth overall) of the Philippine National Games. It was co-hosted by the City of Cebu and the Province of Cebu, Philippines from May 19 to 25, 2018. The games will be organized by the Philippine Sports Commission.

This edition marks the first time in 20 years that Cebu will be hosting the games. The province first hosted the games in 1997.

It was first scheduled for December 10–16, 2017, but rescheduled on April 15–21, 2018, and later moved to May 19–25, 2018.

== Host selection ==
There was no bidding held, and Cebu City and Cebu Province were both awarded the hosting rights outright after an impromptu meeting called for by the Philippine Sports Commission and the Philippine Olympic Committee, where the topic of the hosting of the next PNG was brought up.

== Venues ==
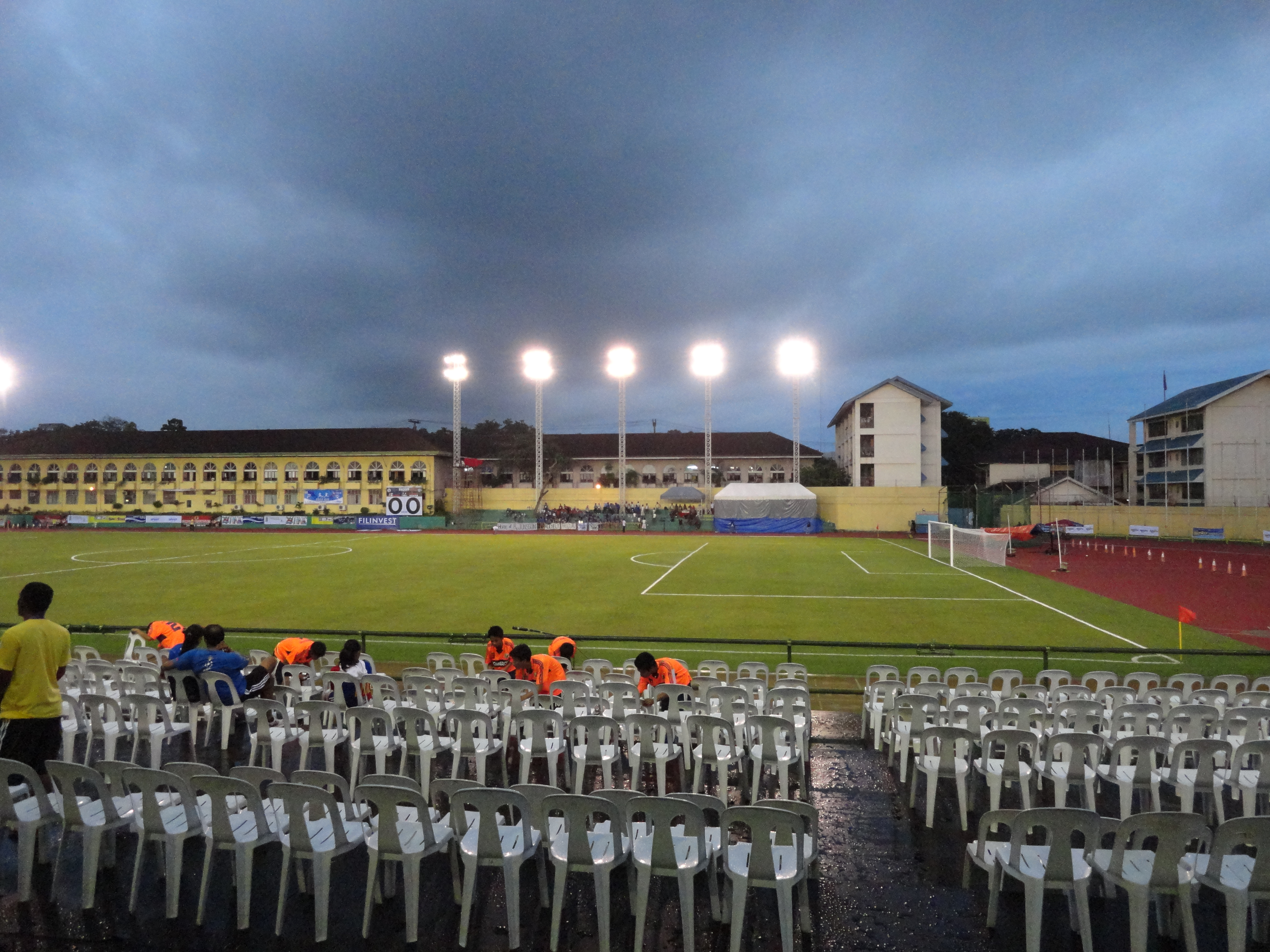
The Cebu City Sports Complex is the venue of the opening ceremony.

Majority of the venues were held in Cebu City with selected events hosted in other cities and towns in Cebu province.

2018 Philippine National Games venues
City/Municipality	Venue	Sport
Cebu City	Cebu City Sports Complex	Athletics, Aquatics
Cebu City	SM Seaside	Arnis, Judo, Karate, Taekwondo
Cebu City	Metro Sports Center	Badminton
Cebu City	New Cebu Coliseum	Boxing
Cebu City	Robinsons Galleria Cebu	Chess, Dancesport, Table tennis
Cebu City	CitiGreen Tennis Court	Tennis (men)
Cebu City	Fort San Pedro	Volleyball (Beach)
Cebu City	University of San Carlos	Volleyball (Indoor; Men)
Cebu City	University of Southern Philippines Foundation Gymnasium	Volleyball (Indoor; Women)
Danao	Danao Track Oval	Archery
Danao	N/A	Cycling, Triathlon (Duathlon)
Naga	Enan Chiong Activity Center	Sepak takraw
Naga	Naga Tennis Court	Tennis (women)
Naga	Open Covered Court	Weightlifting
Lapu-Lapu	Mactan Air Base	Softball
Tabuelan	N/A	Triathlon

== The Games ==
=== Opening ceremony ===
President Rodrigo Duterte formally commenced the games during the opening ceremony of the 2018 Philippine National Games at the Cebu City Sports Complex held on May 19, 2018. The competition proper began the day after.

=== Participating teams ===
A total of 92 local government units (provinces and independent cities) participated in the Games.

=== Sports ===
A total of 19 sports were contested.

- Athletics
- Aquatics
- Archery
- Arnis
- Badminton
- Boxing
- Chess
- Cycling
- Dancesport
- Judo
- Karate
- Sepak takraw
- Softball
- Table tennis
- Taekwondo
- Tennis
- Triathlon
  - Duathlon
- Volleyball
  - Beach volleyball
  - Indoor volleyball
- Weightlifting

=== Medal table ===
The local government unit of Cebu City was named as the overall champions of the Philippine National Games surpassing the performance of Baguio which were the champions of the 2016 edition. A total of 2,578 medals, including 770 gold medals, 770 silver medals and 1,038 bronze medals in 19 disciplines were contested.

Key

* Host LGU (Cebu Province and Cebu City)

2018 Philippine National Games
Rank	LGU	Gold	Silver	Bronze	Total
1	Cebu City*	52	59	71	182
2	Baguio	38	36	54	128
3	Mandaluyong	26	17	27	70
4	Cebu*	18	18	28	64
5	General Santos	16	22	27	65
6–96	Others	620	618	831	2,069
Total		770	770	1,038	2,578
Source: Philippine News Agency
