= Asian Institute of Management =

Private college in Makati, Philippines

- Institusyong Pamamahala sa Asya (Filipino)
- Official logo
- Type: Private business school
- Established: 1968
- Affiliations: AACSB; Global Network for Advanced Management
- President: Jikyeong Kang
- Students: 1,000
- Location: 123 Paseo de Roxas, Legazpi Village, Makati, Philippines; 14°33′08″N 121°01′08″E
- Campus: Urban
- Website: aim.edu
- Location in Metro Manila Location in Luzon Location in the Philippines

The Asian Institute of Management (AIM; Filipino: Institusyong Pamamahala sa Asya) is a graduate business school and research institution located in Makati, Philippines. Established in 1968 in partnership with Harvard Business School, it is accredited by the Association to Advance Collegiate Schools of Business (AACSB).

Stephen H. Fuller, a professor at Harvard Business School, served as its first president. In 2000, Asiaweek ranked AIM among the top institutions in the Asia-Pacific region for executive education.

== History ==
The institute was established in 1968 in partnership with Ateneo de Manila University, De La Salle University, University of the Philippines Diliman, Harvard Business School, the Ford Foundation, and visionaries of the Asian academic and business communities. Its campus, known as the Joseph R. McMicking Campus (after the former CEO of Ayala Corporation), is located in Makati, Metro Manila, Philippines. AIM has a local board of trustees and an international board of governors.

== Organization and Administration ==
AIM is a member of the following associations:

- Association to Advance Collegiate Schools of Business (AACSB)
- Global Network for Advanced Management (GNAM)
- Association of Asia-Pacific Business Schools (AAPBS)
- European Foundation for Management Development (EFMD) Global Business School Network (GBSN), Graduate Management Admission Council (GMAC), and Pacific Asian Consortium for International Business Education and Research (PACIBER). AIM is also a signatory to the Principles for Responsible Management Education (PRME).

== Academics ==
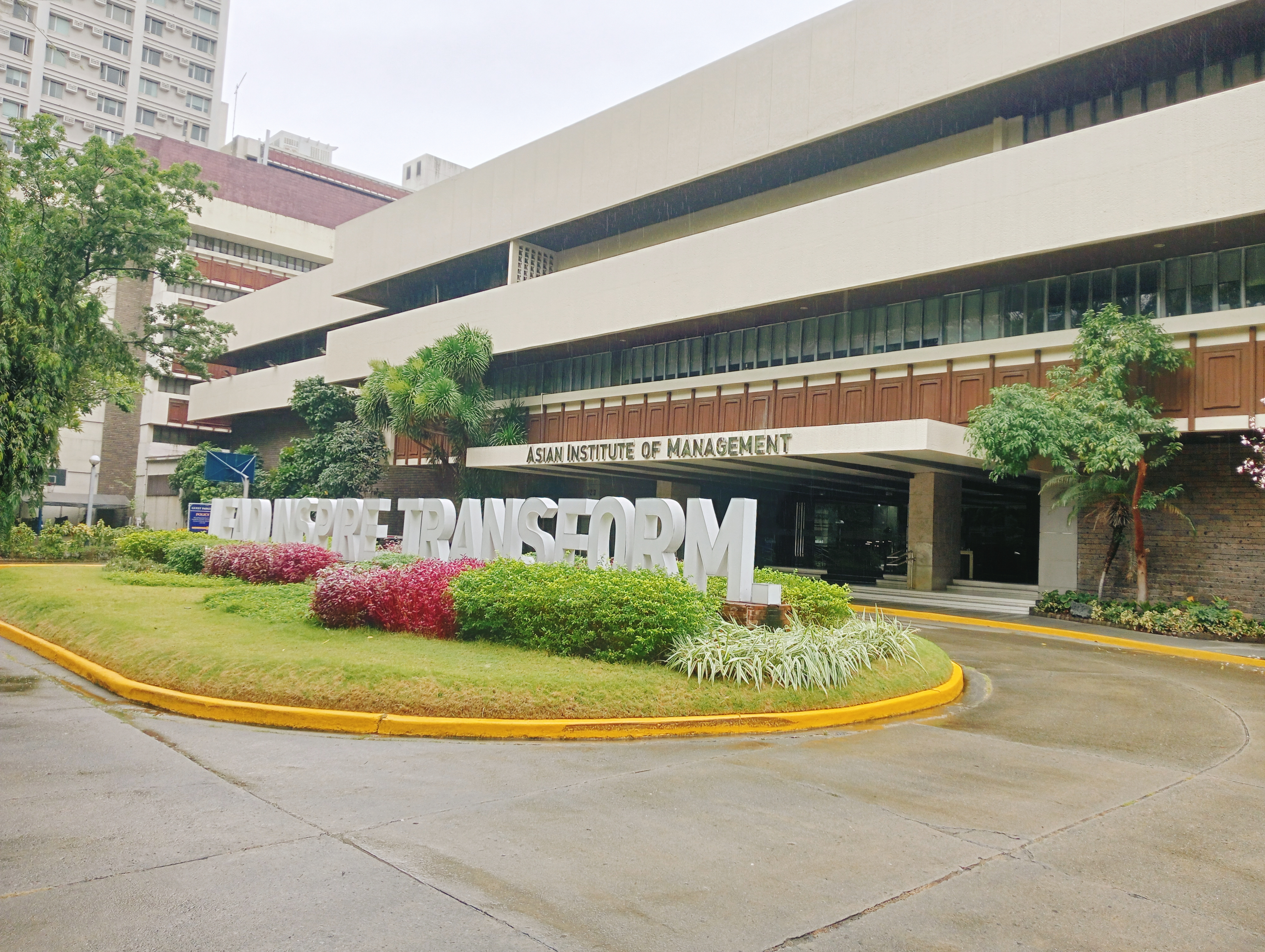
Asian Institute of Management Building

Asian Institute of Management has four schools:

- The Washington SyCip Graduate School of Business (WSGSB) offers seven post-graduate degree programs, ranging from a variety of Master of Business Administration programs, as well as studies in the field of Financial Technology (in collaboration with Manchester Metropolitan University), Cybersecurity Management, and International Business Law. Instruction is based primarily on the case method developed at Harvard Business School. The school applies American and European management principles to problems in Asia.
- The Stephen Zuellig Graduate School of Development Management (SZSDM) currently offers an 18-month Master in Development Management program intended for executives and managers from developing nations, as well a 18-month online Executive Master in Disaster Risk and Crisis Management intended to equip leaders with the skills and experience needed to tackle large-scale challenges. AIM used to offer a Rural Development Management Program in 1976, followed by a Program for Development Managers (PDM) in 1985. PDM then became the core course for the MDM program in 1989. The Center for Development Management at AIM was formally established as a school in 1991. It was renamed the Stephen Zuellig Graduate School of Development Management on March 13, 2014, in honor of Dr. Stephen Zuellig.
- The School of Executive Education and Lifelong Learning (SEELL) is AIM's executive development arm. SEELL has two types of programs: Open Enrollment Programs and Custom Programs designed for the specific needs of the client organization. Open Enrollment Programs include programs for general management, strategy, operations, leadership and people management, innovation, and finance.
- The Aboitiz School of Innovation, Technology, and Entrepreneurship (ASITE) was established in 2017 and offers five programs: the 15-month Master of Science in Innovation and Business, the 15-month Master of Science in Data Science, the 18-month Master in Entrepreneurship, a 4-year double undergraduate Data Science and Business Administration program with the University of Houston, and the first PhD in Data Science program in the Philippines. ASITE also houses an AI R&D laboratory called the Analytics, Computing, and Complex Systems (ACCeSs) lab.

== Washington SyCip Memorial Fund ==
The Washington SyCip Memorial Fund was established after the passing of SyCip in 2017. A lead gift of US$5 million (or almost ₱260 million) was donated by an anonymous philanthropist.

== Rankings ==
The consulting organization and publisher of global academic rankings Center for World University Rankings (CWUR) ranks the Asian Institute of Management as first among all Philippine universities and 1079th worldwide.

== Research ==
Asian Institute of Management features several research centers and one incubator:

The Asian Institute of Management-Rizalino S. Navarro Policy Center for Competitiveness (AIM-RSN PCC) was established in 1996 and serves as AIM's public policy think tank and research arm. The Center focuses on emerging international economic trends and the demands of a competitive global trade and finance environment. AIM-RSN PCC was formerly known as the AIM Policy Center but was renamed in 2015 in honor of former Philippine Secretary of Trade and Industry Rizalino Navarro.

The Ramon V. del Rosario Sr.-Center for Corporate Social Responsibility (AIM RVR Center) focuses on corporate social responsibility and corporate governance. It was established in 2000 and conducts both research and non-research activities. The center was named after Ramon V. Del Rosario Sr., Founder and Chairman of the PHINMA Group. It manages the Hills Program on Governance established by the American International Group through its C.V. Starr Foundation.

The Team Energy Center for Bridging Leadership (CBL) was founded by Prof. Ernesto Garilao after he was inspired by a global research project on "bridging leadership" conducted by the Synergos Institute in 2000. CBL's focus is on developing "Bridging Leaders" who will address societal divides in the Philippines and in Asia. CBL was formerly called the Center for Bridging Societal Divides.

The Gov. Jose B. Fernandez Jr. Center for Banking and Finance (JBF) was launched in 1994 in honor of the late Philippine Central Bank governor Jose B. Fernandez Jr. JBF focuses on researching issues faced by the financial services industry, improving the competence of Asian financial managers, and building alliances between Asian business institutions.

The Dr. Andrew L. Tan Center for Tourism provides studies that support the Philippine tourism and hospitality industry. It was established in 2012 in partnership with Megaworld Foundation and is mainly focused on the development of sustainable tourism in the Philippines and the rest of Asia.

== AIM-Dado Banatao Incubator ==
AIM-Dado Banatao Incubator provides technology, science, or engineering startups with mentorship and training.The incubator was founded under the joint partnership and leadership of AIM, DOST, and PhilDev Foundation. The Incubator won as the "Best Incubator Startup Program" at the DOST Startup Incubator Awards in April 2021.

Startups at the AIM-Dado Banatao Incubator
Year	THINC COHORT	THINC OPEN	THIC CAP
2020	AI4GOV; AutoServed; Digest; FHMoms; Mayani; Olivia; SeeYouDoc	CocoPallet; Farmvocacy; Husay Matuto; LuxxVentures; MWD; RidePDP; PazeBall; Pertana; Tagani	Cooky; PATCAS; ReXi; SGT DRIVE; symlify
2019	Agrabah; ECFulfill; LexMeet; Eskwelabs		
2018	StyleGenie; Antipara; FAME; InvestEd; PayRuler; Podx Technologies; Retail Gate; Rurok Industries		

== Notable alumni ==
Bhutan

- Dil Maya Rai

India

- Ashok Soota - former Vice-Chairman of Wipro, Mindtree co-founder and Chairman of Happiest Minds Technologies
- Ramesh Gelli - former Chairman of Vysya Bank and Founder of Global Trust Bank
- Shankar Sharma - Renowned Investor and Founder, First Global

Indonesia

- Soni Sumarsono

Malaysia

- Hasan Arifin
- Bishan Singh

Philippines

- Tony Tan Caktiong (TMP 1983) - founder, CEO, and President, Jollibee Foods Corp. Philippines; winner of Ernst & Young World Entrepreneur of the Year Award
- Jesli Lapus (MBM 1973) - former Secretary of Education, former CEO of Land Bank of the Philippines
- Martin Andanar (ME 2007) - Secretary of the Presidential Communications Group, former news anchor under TV5 and GMA
- Angelo Reyes (MBM 1973) - former Secretary of Energy; former Secretary of National Defense; former Chief of Staff of the Armed Forces of the Philippines
- Renato de Villa (MBM 1972) - former Executive Secretary and Defense Secretary

Singapore

- Robert Chandran (MBM 1974) - President, Chemoil Corporation

Sri Lanka

- P. B. Abeykoon - attorney in the Supreme Court
